= Producers Guild of America Award for Best Documentary Motion Picture =

Film award

- Awarded for: Outstanding Production of Documentary Theatrical Motion Pictures
- Country: United States
- Presented by: Producers Guild of America
- First award: 2007
- Currently held by: Mariska Hargitay and Trish Adlesic for My Mom Jayne (2025)

The Producers Guild of America Award for Outstanding Producer of Documentary Theatrical Motion Pictures is an award annually given by Producers Guild of America since 2007.

== Winners and nominees ==
=== 2000s ===
Year	Film	Producer(s)	Ref.
2007 (19th)	Sicko	Michael Moore and Meghan O'Hara	
2007 (19th)	Body of War	Phil Donahue and Ellen Spiro	
2007 (19th)	Hear and Now	Irene Taylor Brodsky	
2007 (19th)	Pete Seeger: The Power of Song	Jim Brown, Michael Cohl, and William Eigen	
2007 (19th)	White Light/Black Rain: The Destruction of Hiroshima and Nagasaki	Steven Okazaki	
2008 (20th)	Man on Wire	Simon Chinn	
2008 (20th)	Standard Operating Procedure	Julie Ahlberg and Errol Morris	
2008 (20th)	Trouble the Water	Carl Deal and Tia Lessin	
2009 (21st)	The Cove	Fisher Stevens and Paula DuPré Pesmen	
2009 (21st)	Burma VJ	Lise Lense-Møller	
2009 (21st)	Sergio	John Battsek, Greg Barker, and Julie Goldman	
2009 (21st)	Soundtrack for a Revolution	Joslyn Barnes, Jim Czarnecki, Bill Guttentag, Dan Sturman, and Dylan Nelson	

=== 2010s ===
Year	Film	Producer(s)	Ref.
2010 (22nd)	Waiting for "Superman"	Lesley Chilcott	
2010 (22nd)	Client 9: The Rise and Fall of Eliot Spitzer	Maiken Baird, Alex Gibney, Jedd Wider, and Todd Wider	
2010 (22nd)	Earth Made of Glass	Reid Carolin and Deborah Scranton	
2010 (22nd)	Inside Job	Charles Ferguson and Audrey Marrs	
2010 (22nd)	Smash His Camera	Linda Saffire and Adam Schlesinger	
2010 (22nd)	The Tillman Story	John Battsek	
2011 (23rd)	Beats, Rhymes & Life: The Travels of A Tribe Called Quest	Michael Rapaport, Edward Parks, Frank Mele, and Debra Koffler	
2011 (23rd)	Bill Cunningham New York	Philip Gefter	
2011 (23rd)	Project Nim	Simon Chinn	
2011 (23rd)	Senna	James Gay-Rees	
2011 (23rd)	The Union	Cameron Crowe and Michelle Panek	
2012 (24th)	Searching for Sugar Man	Malik Bendjelloul and Simon Chinn	
2012 (24th)	A People Uncounted	Marc Swenker and Aaron Yegerr	
2012 (24th)	The Gatekeepers	Estelle Fialon, Philippa Kowarsky, and Dror Moreh	
2012 (24th)	The Island President	Richard Berge and Bonni Cohen	
2012 (24th)	The Other Dream Team	Marius Markevicius and Jon Weinbach	
2013 (25th)	We Steal Secrets: The Story of WikiLeaks	Alexis Bloom, Alex Gibney, and Marc Shmuger	
2013 (25th)	Far Out Isn't Far Enough: The Tomi Ungerer Story	Brad Bernstein and Rick Cikowski	
2013 (25th)	Life According to Sam	Andrea Nix Fine, Sean Fine, and Miriam Weintraub	
2013 (25th)	A Place at the Table	Julie Goldman, Ryan Harrington, Kristi Jacobson, and Lori Silverbush	
2013 (25th)	Which Way Is the Front Line from Here? The Life and Time of Tim Hetherington	James Brabazon and Nick Quested	
2014 (26th)	Life Itself	Zak Piper, Steve James, and Garrett Basch	
2014 (26th)	The Green Prince	Nadav Schirman, John Battsek, and Simon Chinn	
2014 (26th)	Merchants of Doubt	Robert Kenner and Melissa Robledo	
2014 (26th)	Particle Fever	David E. Kaplan, Mark Levinson, Andrea Miller, and Carla Solomon	
2014 (26th)	Virunga	Orlando von Einsiedel and Joanna Natasegara	
2015 (27th)	Amy	James Gay-Rees	
2015 (27th)	The Hunting Ground	Amy Ziering	
2015 (27th)	The Look of Silence	Signe Byrge Sørensen	
2015 (27th)	Meru	Elizabeth Chai Vasarhelyi and Jimmy Chin	
2015 (27th)	Something Better to Come	Sigrid Dyekjær and Hanna Polak	
2016 (28th)	O.J.: Made in America	Ezra Edelman and Caroline Waterlow	
2016 (28th)	Dancer	Gabrielle Tana	
2016 (28th)	The Eagle Huntress	Stacey Reiss and Otto Bell	
2016 (28th)	Life, Animated	Julie Goldman and Roger Ross Williams	
2016 (28th)	Tower	Keith Maitland, Susan Thomson, and Megan Gilbride	
2017 (29th)	Jane	Brett Morgen, Bryan Burk, Tony Gerber, and James Smith	
2017 (29th)	Chasing Coral	Jeff Orlowski and Larissa Rhodes	
2017 (29th)	City of Ghosts	Matthew Heineman	
2017 (29th)	Cries from Syria	Evgeny Afineevsky, Den Tolmor, and Aaron I. Butler	
2017 (29th)	Earth: One Amazing Day	Stephen McDonogh	
2017 (29th)	Joshua: Teenager vs. Superpower	Matthew Torne, Mark Rinehart, and Joe Piscatella	
2017 (29th)	The Newspaperman: The Life and Times of Ben Bradlee	Teddy Kunhardt and George Kunhardt	
2018 (30th)	Won't You Be My Neighbor?	Morgan Neville, Nicholas Ma, and Caryn Capotosto	
2018 (30th)	The Dawn Wall	Josh Lowell, Peter Mortimer, and Philipp Manderla	
2018 (30th)	Free Solo	Elizabeth Chai Vasarhelyi, Jimmy Chin, Evan Hayes, and Shannon Dill	
2018 (30th)	Hal	Christine Beebe, Jonathan Lynch, and Brian Morrow	
2018 (30th)	Into the Okavango	Neil Gelinas	
2018 (30th)	RBG	Betsy West and Julie Cohen	
2018 (30th)	Three Identical Strangers	Becky Read and Grace Hughes-Hallett	
2019 (31st)	Apollo 11	Todd Douglas Miller and Thomas Petersen	
2019 (31st)	Advocate	Philippe Bellaïche and Rachel Leah Jones	
2019 (31st)	American Factory	Steven Bognar, Julia Reichert, and Jeff Reichert	
2019 (31st)	The Cave	Kirstine Barfod and Sigrid Dyekjaer	
2019 (31st)	For Sama	Waad Al-Kateab	
2019 (31st)	Honeyland	Atanas Georgiev and Ljubomir Stefanov	
2019 (31st)	One Child Nation	Christoph Jörg, Julie Goldman, Christopher Clements, Carolyn Hepburn, Nanfu Wang, and Jialing Zhan	

=== 2020s ===
Year	Film	Producer(s)	Ref.
2020 (32nd)	My Octopus Teacher	Craig Foster	
2020 (32nd)	David Attenborough: A Life on Our Planet	Jonnie Hughes	
2020 (32nd)	Dick Johnson Is Dead	Kirsten Johnson, Katy Chevigny, and Marilyn Ness	
2020 (32nd)	Softie	Toni Kamau and Sam Soko	
2020 (32nd)	A Thousand Cuts	Ramona S. Diaz, Leah Marino, Julie Goldman, Christopher Clements, and Carolyn Hepburn	
2020 (32nd)	Time	Lauren Domino, Kellen Quinn, and Garrett Bradley	
2020 (32nd)	The Truffle Hunters	Michael Dweck and Gregory Kershaw	
2021 (33rd)	Summer of Soul (...Or, When the Revolution Could Not Be Televised)	Joseph Patel, David Dinerstein, and Robert Fyvolent	
2021 (33rd)	Ascension	Jessica Kingdon, Kira Simon-Kennedy, and Nathan Truesdell	
2021 (33rd)	The First Wave	Matthew Heineman, Jenna Millman, and Leslie Norville (Note: The individual producer(s) nominated for this film were not announced by the Producers Guild of America (neither in the initial nominations announcement nor in any other press release related to the ceremony), for example, because the eligible producers had not been determined at the time of the nominations announcement or because the producers were only announced for the winning film. In lieu of the official nominee(s), every individual credited as a producer is listed here.)	
2021 (33rd)	Flee	Monica Hellström, Signe Byrge Sørensen, and Charlotte de la Gournerie	
2021 (33rd)	In the Same Breath	Nanfu Wang, Jialing Zhang, Julie Goldman, Christopher Clements, and Carolyn Hepburn	
2021 (33rd)	The Rescue	Elizabeth Chai Vasarhelyi, Jimmy Chin, John Battsek, P. J. van Sandwijk, and Bob Eisenhardt	
2021 (33rd)	Simple as Water	Robin Hessman and Megan Mylan	
2021 (33rd)	Writing with Fire	Rintu Thomas and Sushmit Ghosh	
2022 (34th)	Navalny	Odessa Rae, Diane Becker, Melanie Miller, and Shane Boris	
2022 (34th)	All That Breathes	Aman Mann, Shaunak Sen, and Teddy Leifer	
2022 (34th)	Descendant	Margaret Brown, Kyle Martin, and Essie Chambers	
2022 (34th)	Fire of Love	Sara Dosa, Shane Boris, and Ina Fichman	
2022 (34th)	Nothing Compares	Eleanor Emptage and Michael Mallie	
2022 (34th)	Retrograde	Matthew Heineman and Caitlin McNally	
2022 (34th)	The Territory	Sigrid Dyekjaer, Will Miller, Lizzie Gillett, Darren Aronofsky, Gabriel Uchida, and Alex Pritz	
2023 (35th)	American Symphony	Lauren Domino, Matthew Heineman, and Joedan Okun	
2023 (35th)	20 Days in Mariupol	Raney Aronson-Rath, Mstyslav Chernov, Derl McCrudden, and Michelle Mizner	
2023 (35th)	Beyond Utopia	Jana Edelbaum, Rachel Cohen, and Sue Mi Terry	
2023 (35th)	The Disappearance of Shere Hite	Nicole Newnham, Molly O'Brien, R. J. Cutler, Elise Pearlstein, Kimberley Ferdinando, and Trevor Smith	
2023 (35th)	The Mother of All Lies	Asmae El Moudir	
2023 (35th)	Smoke Sauna Sisterhood	Marianne Ostrat	
2023 (35th)	Squaring the Circle (The Story of Hipgnosis)	Trish D. Chetty, Ged Doherty, and Colin Firth	
2024 (36th)	Super/Man: The Christopher Reeve Story	Lizzie Gillett, Robert Ford, and Ian Bonhôte	
2024 (36th)	Gaucho Gaucho	Michael Dweck and Gregory Kershaw	
2024 (36th)	Mediha	Hasan Oswald, Annelise Mecca, and Fahrinisa Campana	
2024 (36th)	Mountain Queen: The Summits of Lhakpa Sherpa	Michael D. Ratner, Miranda Sherman, Dalia Burde, and Christopher Newman	
2024 (36th)	Porcelain War	Aniela Sidorska and Paula DuPré Pesmen	
2024 (36th)	We Will Dance Again	Michal Weits	
2025 (37th)	My Mom Jayne	Mariska Hargitay and Trish Adlesic	
2025 (37th)	The Alabama Solution	Andrew Jarecki, Charlotte Kaufman, Alelur "Alex" Duran and Beth Shelburne	
2025 (37th)	Cover-Up	Laura Poitras, Mark Obenhaus, Yoni Golijov and Olivia Streisand	
2025 (37th)	Mr. Nobody Against Putin	Helle Faber, Alžběta Karásková and Radovan Síbrt	
2025 (37th)	Ocean with David Attenborough	Toby Nowlan and Keith Scholey	
2025 (37th)	The Perfect Neighbor	Alisa Payne, Geeta Gandbhir, Nikon Kwantu and Sam Bisbee	
2025 (37th)	The Tale of Silyan	Jean Dakar, Anna Hashmi, Tamara Kotevska and Jordanco Petkovski	

== Multiple nominations and wins ==
Wins	Nominations	Name (Year)
2	5	Simon Chinn (2008, 2011, 2012, 2014, 2018)
1	4	Matthew Heineman (2017, 2021, 2022, 2023)
1	2	Paula DuPré Pesmen (2009, 2024)
1	2	Alex Gibney (2010, 2013)
1	2	James Gay-Rees (2011, 2015)
1	2	Lauren Domino (2020, 2023)
1	2	Shane Boris (2022)
1	2	Lizzie Gillett (2022, 2024)
0	5	Julie Goldman (2009, 2013, 2016, 2019, 2020)
0	4	John Battsek (2009, 2010, 2014, 2021)
0	3	Elizabeth Chai Vasarhelyi (2015, 2018, 2021)
0	3	Jimmy Chin (2015, 2018, 2021)
0	3	Sigrid Dyekjær (2015, 2019, 2022)
0	2	Signe Byrge Sørensen (2015, 2021)
0	2	Christopher Clements (2019, 2020)
0	2	Carolyn Hepburn (2019, 2020)
0	2	Michael Dweck (2020, 2024)
0	2	Gregory Kershaw (2020, 2024)

== See also ==
- Academy Award for Best Documentary Feature
