= 21st Producers Guild of America Awards =

21st Annual Producers Guild Awards
- Date: January 24, 2010
- Location: Hollywood Palladium, Hollywood, California
- Country: United States
- Presented by: Producers Guild of America

Highlights
- Best Producer(s) Motion Picture: The Hurt Locker – Kathryn Bigelow, Mark Boal, Nicolas Chartier, and Greg Shapiro
- Best Producer(s) Animated Feature: Up – Jonas Rivera
- Best Producer(s) Documentary Motion Picture: The Cove – Fisher Stevens and Paula DuPré Pesmen

The 21st Producers Guild of America Awards (also known as 2010 Producers Guild Awards), honoring the best film and television producers of 2009, were held at Hollywood Palladium in Hollywood, California on January 24, 2010. The nominations were announced on November 30, 2009 and January 5, 2010.

== Winners and nominees ==
=== Film ===
Darryl F. Zanuck Award for Outstanding Producer of Theatrical Motion Pictures
- The Hurt Locker – Kathryn Bigelow, Mark Boal, Nicolas Chartier, and Greg Shapiro
  - Avatar – James Cameron and Jon Landau
  - District 9 – Peter Jackson and Carolynne Cunningham
  - An Education – Finola Dwyer and Amanda Posey
  - Inglourious Basterds – Lawrence Bender
  - Invictus – Clint Eastwood, Lori McCreary, Robert Lorenz, and Mace Neufeld
  - Precious – Lee Daniels, Sarah Siegel-Magness, and Gary Magness
  - Star Trek – J. J. Abrams and Damon Lindelof
  - Up – Jonas Rivera
  - Up in the Air – Ivan Reitman, Jason Reitman, and Daniel Dubiecki
Outstanding Producer of Animated Theatrical Motion Pictures
- Up – Jonas Rivera
  - 9 – Timur Bekmambetov, Tim Burton, and Jim Lemley
  - Coraline – Bill Mechanic, Mary Sandell, Henry Selick, and Claire Jennings
  - Fantastic Mr. Fox – Allison Abbate, Scott Rudin, and Wes Anderson
  - The Princess and the Frog – Peter Del Vecho
Outstanding Producer of Documentary Theatrical Motion Pictures
- The Cove – Fisher Stevens and Paula DuPré Pesmen
  - Burma VJ – Lise Lense-Møller
  - Sergio – John Battsek, Greg Barker, and Julie Goldman
  - Soundtrack for a Revolution – Joslyn Barnes, Jim Czarnecki, Bill Guttentag, Dan Sturman, and Dylan Nelson

=== Television ===
Norman Felton Award for Outstanding Producer of Episodic Television, Drama
- Mad Men
  - Breaking Bad
  - Dexter
  - Lost
  - True Blood
Danny Thomas Award for Outstanding Producer of Episodic Television, Comedy
- 30 Rock
  - Californication
  - Entourage
  - The Office
  - Weeds
David L. Wolper Award for Outstanding Producer of Long-Form Television
- Grey Gardens
  - Georgia O'Keeffe
  - Little Dorrit
  - Prayers for Bobby
  - The Prisoner
  - Taking Chance
Outstanding Producer of Non-Fiction Television
- 60 Minutes
  - Deadliest Catch
  - Intervention
  - Kathy Griffin: My Life on the D-List
  - This American Life
Outstanding Producer of Live Entertainment & Competition Television
- The Colbert Report
  - The Amazing Race
  - American Idol
  - Project Runway
  - Top Chef

=== David O. Selznick Achievement Award in Theatrical Motion Pictures ===
- John Lasseter

=== Milestone Award ===
- Amy Pascal and Michael Lynton

=== Norman Lear Achievement Award in Television ===
- Mark Burnett

=== Stanley Kramer Award ===
Awarded to the motion picture that best illuminates social issues.

- Precious: Based on the Novel "Push" by Sapphire

=== Vanguard Award ===
Awarded in recognition of outstanding achievement in new media and technology.

- Joss Whedon
