= We Are the Giant =

- Film poster
- Directed by: Greg Barker
- Produced by: Greg Barker; John Battsek; Julie Goldman
- Cinematography: Muhammad Hamdy; Frank-Peter Lehmann
- Edited by: Joshua Altman
- Music by: Philip Sheppard
- Production companies: Motto Pictures; Passion Pictures
- Release date: January 18, 2014 (Sundance Film Festival)
- Running time: 90 minutes
- Country: United States
- Languages: English; Arabic

We Are the Giant is a 2014 American documentary film produced and directed by Greg Barker. The film had its world premiere at 2014 Sundance Film Festival on January 18, 2014.

The film received a limited theatrical run from October 30, 2014 in the UK. A special screening and panel Q&A took place at London's BFI cinema on the October 30, 2014.

== Synopsis ==
The film narrates the stories of ordinary individuals who are transformed by the critical moral and personal challenges they encounter when standing up for what they believe is right.

== Reception ==
We Are the Giant received positive reviews from critics. Dennis Harvey of Variety, said in his review that "Despite its harrowing on-the-ground footage, Greg Barker's Arab Spring documentary risks pretentiousness." Boyd van Hoeij in his review for The Hollywood Reporter praised the film by writing that "A slickly assembled and insightful documentary that looks at three individual stories from the Arab Spring." Robert Cameron Fowler of Indiewire grade the film A by writing that ""We Are the Giant” is both vital and devastating, with raw material conveyed through elegant construction. Barker asks the hard questions, issuing the frightening possibly of necessary violence when pacifism yields no results." Brent Simon in his review for Paste Magazine said that "The clarion call of a grander moral calling anchors the documentary We Are the Giant, and in large part saves it from its own overstuffed passion."
