= Motto Pictures =

Documentary production company

- Industry: Documentary
- Founded: 2009
- Founder: Julie Goldman, Christopher Clements
- Headquarters: Brooklyn, NY
- Key people: Julie Goldman, Christopher Clements, Carolyn Hepburn
- Website: mottopictures.com

Motto Pictures is a documentary production company based in Brooklyn, New York, specializing in producing and executive producing documentary features. Motto secures financing, builds distribution strategies, and creatively develops films, and has produced over 25 feature documentaries and won numerous awards.

== History ==
Motto Pictures was founded in 2009 by Julie Goldman and Christopher Clements, Emmy and Peabody Award-winning producers of documentary feature films.

== Films ==
Year	Film	Director(s)	Awards	Notes
2009	Sergio	Greg Barker	Sundance Film Festival: 2009 Premiere; Sundance Film Festival: 2009 Documentary Film Editing Award; Primetime Emmy Nominee: 2010 Exceptional Merit in Nonfiction Filmmaking; Producers Guild Association: 2010 Nominee for Outstanding Producer of Documentary Theatrical Motion Pictures; International Documentary Association: 2009 Nominee for ABCNews VideoSource Award	
2011	Buck	Cindy Meehl	Sundance Film Festival: 2011 Premiere; Sundance Film Festival: 2011 Audience Award; Shortlisted for 2012 Academy Award for Best Feature Documentary; National Board of Review: 2011 Top Five Documentaries; Critics’ Choice Movie Award Nominee: 2012 Best Documentary Feature; Full Frame Documentary Film Festival: 2011 Audience Award; DocuWest Film Festival: 2011 Best Feature Length; Cinema Eye Honors: 2012 Audience Choice Prize; Zurich Film Festival: 2011 Golden Eye Best International Documentary Film; Broadcast Film Critics Association: 2012 Best Documentary Feature; New York Film Critics Circle Awards: 2011 3rd place NYFCC Award for Best Non-Fiction Film; Warsaw International Film Festival: 2011 Audience Award for Documentary and Best Documentary nominee; Gotham Independent Film Awards: 2011 Gotham Audience Award Nominee	
2011	Koran By Heart	Greg Barker	Tribeca Film Festival: 2011 Premiere; Tribeca Film Festival: 2011 Jury Award nominee for Best Documentary Feature; Motion Picture Sound Editors: 2012 Golden Reel Nominee for Best Sound Editing – Long Form Documentary; Banff Television Festival: 2012 Nominee, Best Youth Program: Non-Fiction	
2011	Our School	Mona Nicoara, Miruna Coca-Cozma	Tribeca Film Festival: 2011 North America Premiere; Tribeca Film Festival: 2011 Jury Award nominee for Best Documentary Feature; Silverdocs Documentary Festival: 2011 Sterling Award for Best U.S. Feature; Créteil International Women's Film Festival: 2012 Graine de Cinéphage Award for Best Picture	
2011	Better This World	Kelly Duane, Katie Galloway	SXSW Film Festival: 2011 Premiere; Emmy Awards Nominee: 2012 Best Documentary; Emmy Awards Nominee: 2012 Outstanding Investigative Journalism – Long Form; Emmy Awards Nominee: 2012 Outstanding Individual Achievement in a Craft: Editing – Documentary and Long Form; International Documentary Association: 2011 Creative Recognition Award: Music; International Documentary Association: 2011 Best Feature Nominee; Writers Guild of America: 2012 Best Documentary Screenplay; Gotham Independent Film Awards: 2011 Best Documentary; San Francisco International Film Festival: 2011 Best Documentary Feature; Sarasota Film Festival: 2011 Best Documentary Feature; Dallas Video Festival: 2011 Best Documentary; Cinema Eye Honors: 2012 Nominee for Outstanding Achievement in Graphic Design or Animation	
2012	Beware of Mr. Baker	Jay Bulger	SXSW Film Festival: 2012 Premiere; SXSW Film Festival: 2012 Grand Jury Prize for Best Documentary Feature; CPH:DOX: 2012 Sound & Vision Award; London Film Festival: 2012 Grierson Award Nominee; Krakow Film Festival: 2013 Golden Heynal Award	
2012	A Place at the Table	Kristi Jacobson, Lori Silverbush	Sundance Film Festival: 2012 Official Selection; Producers Guild of America: 2014 Nominee for Outstanding Producer of Documentary Motion Pictures; International Documentary Association: 2013 Pare Lorentz Award	
2012	Ai Weiwei: Never Sorry	Alison Klayman	Sundance Film Festival: 2012 Premiere; Sundance Film Festival: 2012 Special Jury Prize; Sundance Film Festival: Grand Jury Prize Nominee; Emmy Award Nominee: 2014 Outstanding Arts & Culture Programming; Emmy Award Nominee: 2014 Outstanding Editing; National Board of Review: 2012 Top Five Documentaries; Directors Guild of America: 2013 Nominee for Outstanding Directorial Achievement in Documentary; Alfred I. duPont-Columbia University: 2013 Broadcast News Award; Nantucket Film Festival: 2012 Best Storytelling in Documentary Award; Telluride Mountainfilm Festival: 2012 Festival Director's Choice Award; Cinema Eye Honors: 2013 Nominee for Outstanding Achievement in Production and Outstanding Achievement in a Debut Feature Film; Sheffield International Documentary Festival: 2012 Special Jury Award Nominee; Vancouver Film Critics Circle (VFCC): 2013 Best Documentary Nominee; Taiwan International Documentary Film Festival: 2012 Special Mention Award, International Competition	
2013	Manhunt: The Search for Bin Laden	Greg Barker	Sundance Film Festival: 2013 Premiere; Sundance Film Festival: 2013 Grand Jury Prize Nominee; Emmy Awards Winner: 2013 Outstanding Documentary or Nonfiction Special; Emmy Awards Nominee: 2013 Outstanding Cinematography for Nonfiction Programming; Motion Picture Sound Editors: 2014 Best Sound Editing – Long Form Documentary	
2013	The Kill Team	Dan Krauss	Tribeca Film Festival: 2013 Premiere; Tribeca Film Festival: 2013 Best Documentary Feature; Shortlisted for 2015 Academy Award for Best Feature Documentary; Independent Spirit Awards: 2014 Nominee for Truer Than Fiction Award; National Board of Review, USA: 2014 Top Five Documentaries; San Francisco International Film Festival: 2013 Golden Gate Award; Directors Guild of America: 2015 Outstanding Directorial Achievement in Documentary Nominee; News & Documentary Emmy Award: 2016 Nominee for Outstanding Investigative Journalism – Long Form; Warsaw International Film Festival: 2013 Best Documentary Nominee	
2013	God Loves Uganda	Roger Ross Williams	Sundance Film Festival: 2013 Premiere; Sundance Film Festival: 2013 Grand Jury Prize Nominee; Shortlisted for 2014 Academy Award for Best Feature Documentary; Sheffield Doc/Fest: 2013 Sheffield Youth Jury Award; Ashland Independent Film Festival: 2013 Award for Best Documentary: Feature Length; Full Frame Documentary Film Festival: 2013 Inspiration Award; GLAAD Media Award: 2014 Nominee for Outstanding Documentary	
2013	Gideon's Army	Dawn Porter	Sundance Film Festival: 2013 Premiere; Sundance Film Festival: 2013 US Documentary Editing Award; Sundance Film Festival: 2013 Nominee for Grand Jury Prize; Emmy Awards Nominee: 2014 Outstanding Informational Programming - Long Form; Independent Spirit Awards: 2014 Nominee for Best Documentary; The Ridenhour Prizes: 2014 Documentary Film Prize; Social Impact Media Awards: 2014 Best Editing; Cinema Eye Honors: 2014 Nominee for Outstanding Achievement in Nonfiction Filmmaking Television	
2014	The Great Invisible	Margaret Brown	SXSW Film Festival: 2014 Premiere; SXSW Film Festival: 2014 Grand Jury Prize; Emmy Award Nominee: Primetime Emmy for Exceptional Merit in Documentary Filmmaking; Zurich Film Festival: 2014 Golden Eye nominee for Best International Documentary Film; Cinema Eye Honors: 2015 nominee for Outstanding Achievement in Original Music Score	
2014	1971	Johanna Hamilton	Tribeca Film Festival: 2014 Premiere; Tribeca Film Festival: Nominee for Jury Award for Best Documentary Feature; International Documentary Association: 2014 ABCNews VideoSource Award; Cinema Eye Honors: 2015 Spotlight Award; Emmy Award Nominee: 2016 Outstanding Historical Programming – Long Form	
2014	Art and Craft	Sam Cullman, Jennifer Grausman	Tribeca Film Festival: 2014 Premiere; Shortlisted for 2015 Academy Award for Best Feature Documentary; Emmy Award Nominee: 2016 Outstanding Arts & Culture Programming; National Board Review: 2014 Top Five Documentaries; Cinema Eye Honors: 2015 Award for ‘The Unforgettables’	
2014	We Are the Giant	Greg Barker	Sundance Film Festival: 2014 Premiere; Hawaii International Film Festival: 2014 Halekulani Golden Orchid Documentary Feature Award; SXSW Film Festival: 2015 Nominee for Film Design Award for Excellence in Title Design	
2014	The Yes Men Are Revolting	Andy Bichlbaum, Mike Bonanno, Laura Nix	Toronto International Film Festival: 2014 Premiere; Berlin International Film Festival: 2015 2nd place Panorama Audience Award for Documentary Film	
2015	Blackface	Roger Ross Williams	Premiered on CNN	
2015	Music of Strangers: Yo-Yo Ma and the Silk Road Ensemble	Morgan Neville	Toronto International Film Festival: 2015 Premiere; Emmy Award: 2018 Outstanding Music & Sound; Cinema Audio Society Awards: 2017 Outstanding Achievement in Sound Mixing for Motion Pictures – Documentary; Heartland Film Festival: 2016 Truly Moving Picture Award; Provincetown International Film Festival: 2016 Best Documentary Award; Motion Picture Sound Editors: 2017 Golden Reel Award for Best Sound Editing – Documentary Feature Film; Sydney Film Festival: 2016 3rd place Audience Award for Best Documentary; Critics' Choice Documentary Award: 2016 Nominee for Best Music Documentary	
2015	The 100 Years Show	Alison Klayman	Tribeca Film Festival: 2015 Premiere; Heartland Film Festival: 2015 Grand Prize for Best Documentary Short; Ashland Independent Film Festival: 2016 Best Documentary Short; RiverRun International Film Festival: 2016 Best Documentary Short; Ozark Foothills Film Festival: 2016 Best Documentary Short; Docutah International Documentary Film Festival: 2016 Best Short Picture, 2016 Best Short Direction, 2016 Best Short Editing	
2015	3 1/2 Minutes, Ten Bullets	Marc Silver	Sundance Film Festival: 2015 Premiere; Sundance Film Festival: 2015 Special Jury Prize; Shortlisted for 2016 Academy Award for Best Feature Documentary; Emmy Award Nominee: 2016 Outstanding Coverage of a Current News Story - Long Form; Sheffield International Documentary Festival: 2015 Sheffield Youth Jury Award; RiverRun International Film Festival: 2015 Audience Choice Award for Best Documentary Feature	
2015	Best of Enemies	Robert Gordon, Morgan Neville	Sundance Film Festival: 2015 Premiere; Sundance Film Festival: 2015 Documentary Grand Jury Prize nominee; Shortlisted for 2016 Academy Award for Best Feature Documentary; Emmy Award Winner: 2017 Outstanding Historical Documentary - Long Form; National Board of Review: 2015 Top Five Documentaries; Camden International Film Festival: Audience Award; International Documentary Association: 2015 Creative Recognition Award and Video Source Award; Motion Picture Sound Editors: 2016 Golden Reel Award nominee for Best Sound Editing – Documentary Feature Film; Cinema Eye Honors: 2016 Audience Choice Prize Honors and Award for Outstanding Achievement in Editing; Film Independent Spirit Awards: 2016 Nominee for Best Documentary Feature	
2015	Indian Point	Ivy Meeropol	Tribeca Film Festival: 2015 Premiere Key West Film Festival: 2015 Best Documentary Award	
2016	Homegrown	Greg Barker	Premiered on HBO	
2016	Southwest of Salem: The Story of the San Antonio Four	Deborah S. Esquenazi	Tribeca Film Festival: 2016 Premiere; Emmy Award Nominee: 2017 Outstanding Social Issue Documentary Shortlisted for 2017 Academy Award for Best Original Song (“ Kiss Me Goodnight ,” composed by Sam Lipman); Peabody Award: 2016 Documentary Category; Critics’ Choice Documentary Award: 2016 Nominee for Best First Documentary (TV / Streaming); GLAAD Media Award: 2016 Outstanding Documentary Award; Social Impact Media Awards: 2017 Lens to Action in a Documentary Feature Jury Prize Award	
2016	Solitary	Kristi Jacobson	Tribeca Film Festival: 2016 Premiere; Film Independent Spirit Awards: 2017 Nominee for Truer Than Fiction Award	
2016	Enlighten Us: The Rise and Fall of James Arthur Ray	Jenny Carchman	Tribeca Film Festival: 2015 Premiere	
2016	Extremis	Dan Krauss	Tribeca Film Festival: 2016 Premiere; Tribeca Film Festival: 2016 Best Documentary Short Award; Academy Award Nominee: 2017 Best Documentary Short Subject; Emmy Award Nominee: 2017 Outstanding Short Documentary; Emmy Award Nominee: 2017 Outstanding Editing: Documentary; International Documentary Association: 2016 Best Short Award; San Francisco International Film Festival: 2016 Golden Gate Award	
2016	Life, Animated	Roger Ross Williams	Sundance Film Festival: 2016 Premiere; Sundance Film Festival: 2016 Sundance Directing Award for U.S. Documentary; Academy Award Nominee: 2017 Best Documentary Feature; Full Frame Documentary Film Festival: 2016 Audience Award; San Francisco International Film Festival: 2016 Audience Award; Nantucket Film Festival: 2016 Audience Award; Telluride Mountainfilm: 2016 Audience Award; National Board of Review: 2017 Top Five Documentaries; Annie Award: 2017 Special Achievement Award; Amsterdam International Documentary Film Festival: 2017 2nd place Award for the IDFA Audience Award; Berkshire International Film Festival (BIFF): 2017 Documentary Feature Audience Award; Critics' Choice Documentary Award: 2016 Most Compelling Living Subject of a Documentary; Directors Guild of America: 2017 Nominee for Outstanding Directorial Achievement in Documentary; Producers Guild of America: Nominee for Outstanding Producer of Documentary Theatrical Motion	
2016	Weiner	Josh Kriegman, Elyse Steinberg	Sundance Film Festival: 2016 Premiere; Sundance Film Festival: 2016 Grand Jury Prize for Documentary; Shortlisted for 2017 Academy Award for Best Feature Documentary; Critics’ Choice Documentary Awards: 2016 Best First Documentary; BAFTA Awards: 2017 Nominee for Best Documentary; Directors Guild of America: 2017 Nominee for Outstanding Directorial Achievement in Documentary; American Cinema Editors’ Eddie Awards: 2017 Nominee for Best Edited Documentary Feature; Dublin Film Critics Circle Awards: 2016 Best Documentary; International Documentary Association: 2016 Nominee for Best Feature; Champs-Élysées Film Festival: 2016 Jury Prize; Montclair Film Festival: 2016 David Carr Award for Truth in Non-Fiction Filmmaking; San Diego Film Critics Society Awards: 2016 Best Documentary; New Hampshire Film Festival: 2016 Audience Choice Award – Documentary	
2016	Abacus: Small Enough to Jail	Steve James	Toronto International Film Festival: 2016 Premiere; Academy Award Nominee: 2018 Best Documentary Feature; Emmy Award: 2018 Outstanding Business and Economic Documentary; Critics’ Choice Documentary Awards: 2017 Best Political Documentary; National Board of Review: 2017 Top Five Documentaries; Chicago Film Critics Association: 2017 Nominee for Best Documentary; Sarasota Film Festival: 2017 Best Documentary; Portland International Film Festival: 2017 third place Audience Award for Best Documentary	
2017	The Family I Had	Katie Green, Carlye Rubin	Tribeca Film Festival: 2017 Premiere	
2017	Shadowman	Oren Jacoby	Tribeca Film Festival: 2017 Premiere	
2017	When God Sleeps	Till Schauder	Tribeca Film Festival: 2017 Premiere Shortlisted for 2017 German Academy Award for Best Documentary; Cinema for Peace Awards: 2017 Most Valuable Documentary of the Year; Krakow Film Festival: 2017 Best Music Documentary; Sound Unseen Film Festival: 2017 Jury Competition Award	
2017	The Final Year	Greg Barker	Toronto International Film Festival: 2017 Premiere	
2018	The Cleaners	Moritz Riesewieck, Hans Block	Sundance Film Festival: 2018 PremiereInternational Film Festival and Forum on Human Rights: Winner of the Gilda Vieira De Mello Award	
2018	Inventing Tomorrow	Laura Nix	Sundance Film Festival: 2018 PremiereSeattle International Film Festival: 2018 Grand Jury Prize	
2018	Take Your Pills	Alison Klayman	SXSW Film Festival: 2018 Premiere	
2018	The Raft	Marcus Lindeen	CPH:DOX: 2018 Premiere and Dox:Award Winner	
2018	Charm City	Marilyn Ness	Tribeca Film Festival: 2018 Premiere	
2018	Love, Gilda	Lisa D'Apolito	Tribeca Film Festival: 2018 Premiere	
2018	Take Back the Harbor	Kristi Jacobson, Roger Ross Williams	DOC NYC: 2018 Premiere; New York Wild Film Festival: 2019 Best Wild New York Film Winner	
2019	One Child Nation	Nanfu Wang, Jialing Zhang	Sundance Film Festival: 2019 Premiere; Sundance Film Festival: 2019 U.S. Documentary Grand Jury Prize Winner	
2019	Bully. Coward. Victim. The Story of Roy Cohn	Ivy Meeropol	New York Film Festival: 2019 Premiere	
2019	Oliver Sacks: His Own Life	Ric Burns	Telluride Film Festival: 2019 Premiere	
2019	The Apollo	Roger Ross Williams	Tribeca Film Festival: 2019 Premiere	
2019	Ringside	André Hörmann	Berlin International Film Festival: 2019 Premiere; Chicago International Film Festival: 2019 Winner for Best Documentary	
2019	The Raft	Marcus Lindeen	CPH:DOX: 2018 Premiere; CPH:DOX: 2018 Grand Jury Prize Winner	
2020	Socks on Fire	Bo McGuire	Tribeca Film Festival: 2020 Premiere; Tribeca Film Festival Winner for Best Documentary Feature 2020; L.A. Outfest: 2021 Winner for Artistic Achievement; Nashville Film Festival: 2021 Winner for Best Documentary Feature; Virginia Film Festival: 2021 Winner for Best Documentary Feature	
2020	The Mole Agent	Maite Alberdi	Sundance Film Festival: 2020 Premiere; San Sebastián Film Festival: 2020 Audience Award; Academy Award Nomination: Best Documentary; 63rd Ariel Awards: 2021 Best Ibero American Film; Premios Platino: 2021 Best Documentary Film: DOC NYC: 2020; New Directors New Films: 2020; International Documentary Film Festival Amsterdam: 2020	
2020	A Thousand Cuts	Ramona S. Diaz	Sundance Film Festival: 2020 Official Selection; DOC NYC Short List: 2020 Official Selection; SXSW: 2020 Official Selection; AFI DOCS: 2020 Official Selection; IDFA: 2020 Official Selection; IDA Documentary Awards: Winner for Truth to Power; IFP Gotham Awards: Winner for Best Documentary; Cinema Eye Honors: Winner for The Unforgettables; Cinema Eye Honors: Nominee for Best Production; 2022 Peabody Award Winner	
2021	In the Same Breath	Nanfu Wang	Sundance Film Festival: 2021 World Premiere; SXSW 2021 Audience Award Winner; One World Film Festival 2021 Right to Know Winner; DOC NYC: 2021 Short List; Alfred I. duPont-Columbia: 2022 Award Winner; 2022 Peabody Award Winner	
2021	The Velvet Underground	Todd Haynes	Cannes Film Festival: 2021 World Premiere; New York Film Festival: 2021 US Premiere; London Film Festival: 2021 UK Premiere; Boston Society of Film Critics Awards: 2021 Winner for Best Film Editing; San Sebastián International Film Festival: 2021	
2022	The Return of Tanya Tucker: Featuring Brandi Carlile	Kathlyn Horan	South by Southwest: 2022 Premiere; South by Southwest: 2022 Audience Beats Per Second Award	
2022	American Pain	Darren Foster	Tribeca Film Festival: 2022 Premiere	
2022	Unfinished Business	Alison Klayman	Tribeca Film Festival: 2022 Premiere	
2023	Victim/Suspect	Nancy Schwartzman	2023 Sundance Film Festival: 2023 Premiere	
2024	Eternal You	Hans Block & Moritz Riesewieck	2024 Sundance Film Festival: 2024 premiere	
2025	Selena y Los Dinos	Isabel Castro	2025 Sundance Film Festival: 2025 premiere	
