= Philip Sheppard (musician) =

English musician, composer (born 1969)

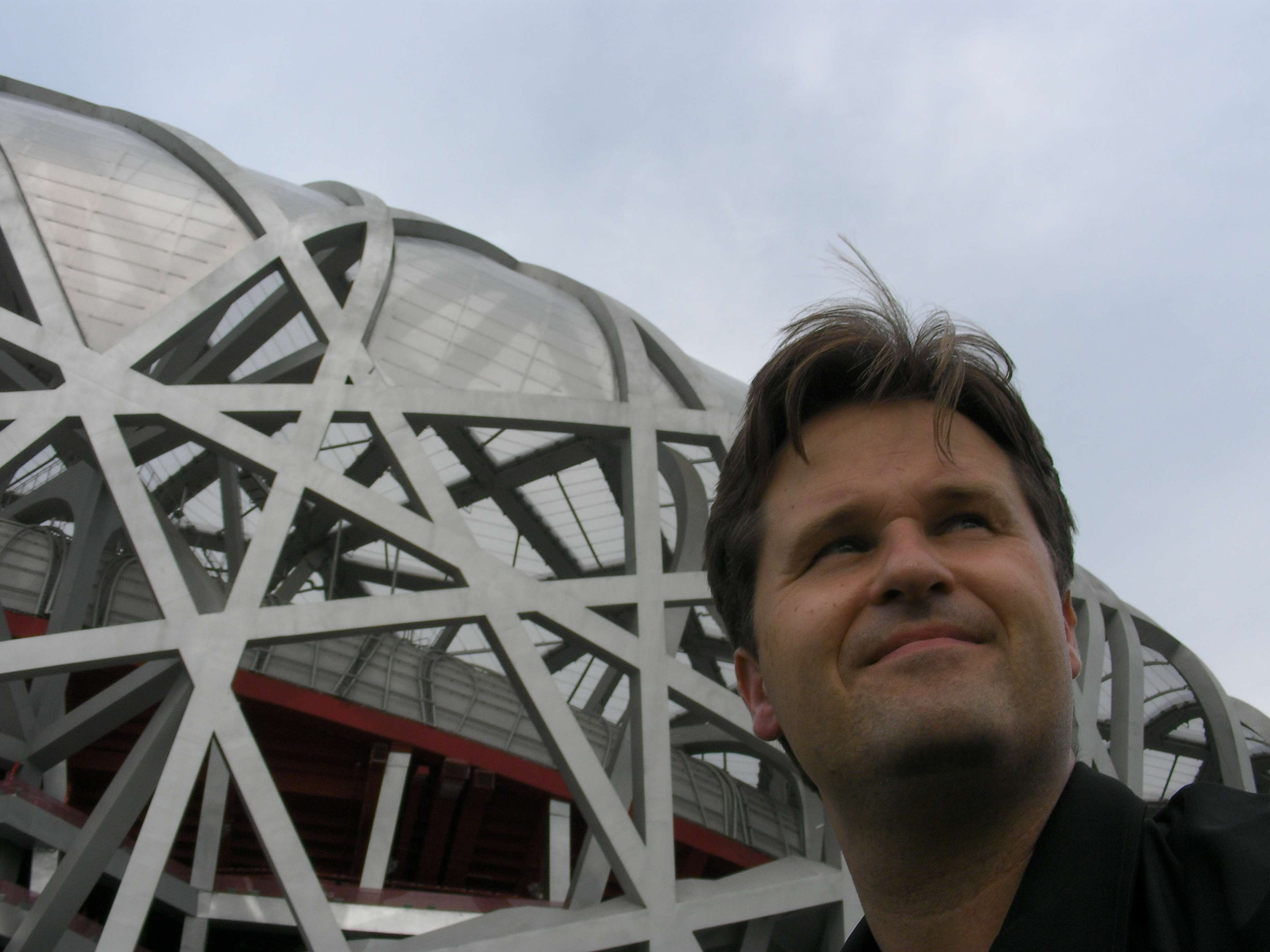
- Sheppard at the 2008 Olympic Games

Background information
- Born: 4 November 1969 (age 56)
- Genres: Classical film, television and video game scores and soundtracks
- Occupations: Musician; composer
- Instruments: Cello; electric cello; conductor
- Label: Radiomovies Limited
- Website: philipsheppard.com

Philip Sheppard (born 4 November 1969) is an English musician.

== Career ==
=== Film and Video game soundtracks ===
In 2017 Sheppard worked with director Greg Barker and producer John Battsek on the soundtracks for the films The Final Year and Legion of Brothers. Sheppard also composed the original score for Chosen. In 2018 he collaborated with director David Sington on the Soundtrack for the Netflix original documentary Mercury 13.

Philip Sheppard composed some soundtracks for the critically acclaimed game Detroit: Become Human, such as the main theme for Kara, Little One and Dark Night.

=== Solo albums and collaborations ===
In 2017, Sheppard collaborated with Odesza on their album, A Moment Apart. Sheppard is featured on the strings for "A Moment Apart" and "Just A Memory". In 2018, Sheppard released his sophomore solo orchestral album, Fall From Earth.

=== Keynotes ===
Sheppard has delivered keynotes in conferences such as C2MTL, e.g. conference, Business Innovation Factory, and The How To Academy.

== Bibliography ==
- Sheppard, Philip. 2008. Music Makes Your Child Smarter: How Music Helps Every Child's Development. (ISBN 0825673313, 978-0825673313). Schirmer Trade Books.
