= 1st Astra Creative Arts TV Awards =

2024 American television programming awards

- Date: January 8, 2024
- Site: Biltmore Hotel; Los Angeles, California
- Hosted by: Aida Rodriguez
- Most wins: The Boys / RuPaul's Drag Race (2)
- Most nominations: The Last of Us (6)
- Website: hollywoodcreative.org

Television/radio coverage
- Network: ABS-CBN News; KNEKT Television Network; YouTube (@HollywoodCreativeAlliance)

The 1st Astra Creative Arts TV Awards, presented by the Hollywood Creative Alliance, recognized and celebrated outstanding achievements in television across various genres. The winners were announced on January 8, 2024, alongside the 3rd Astra TV Awards. The creative arts awards were created as a companion to the Astra TV Awards to reward specific technical categories as well as categories that were previously presented at the main ceremony in 2021 and 2022.

"We are thrilled to announce our inaugural Creative Arts Awards, an event dedicated to celebrating those behind the scenes who don't often get the level of recognition they deserve," states HCA President Nikki Fowler.

The nominations were announced on July 11, 2023, alongside the nominations for the 3rd Astra TV Awards. In terms of the Creative Arts TV Awards, The Last of Us led the nominations with six, followed by The Boys, The Marvelous Mrs. Maisel and Saturday Night Live (all with five each). Channelwise, HBO led the nominations with 22, followed by Netflix with 17; ABC and Prime Video both received 16 each. This year, the Astra TV Awards spread across 25 Broadcast and Cable, 22 Streaming, and 26 Creative Arts categories.

The Creative Arts TV Awards did not return in subsequent years. Many of the categories returned to the primary TV awards including Best Documentary and Best Game Show while other categories had their first and only presentation at this ceremony including the Stunts, Casting, and Costume awards.

== Winners and nominees ==
=== Programs ===
| Best Streaming Documentary Movie: Judy Blume Forever (Prime Video); Call Me Miss Cleo (Max); Selena Gomez: My Mind & Me (Apple TV+); Sidney (Apple TV+); "Sr." (Netflix); Still: A Michael J. Fox Movie (Apple TV+) | Best Streaming Nonfiction Series: The Reluctant Traveler with Eugene Levy (Apple TV+); Harry & Meghan (Netflix); Prehistoric Planet 2 (Apple TV+); Rainn Wilson and the Geography of Bliss (Peacock); Rennervations (Disney+); The 1619 Project (Hulu) |
| Best Broadcast Network or Cable Documentary: Love to Love You, Donna Summer (HBO); Last Flight Home (MTV); The U.S. and the Holocaust (PBS); White Coat Rebels (Fuse) | Best Broadcast Network or Cable Nonfiction Series: 30 for 30 (ESPN); Dear Mama: The Saga of Afeni and Tupac Shakur (FX); Eva Longoria: Searching for Mexico (CNN); Leguizamo Does America (MSNBC); Stanley Tucci: Searching for Italy (CNN); Vice (Showtime) |
| Best Talk Series: The Daily Show with Trevor Noah (Comedy Central); Jimmy Kimmel Live! (ABC); Real Time with Bill Maher (HBO); RuPaul's Drag Race: The Pit Stop with Bianca Del Rio (MTV); The Late Show with Stephen Colbert (CBS); The Problem with Jon Stewart (Apple TV+) | Best Variety Series or Special: A Black Lady Sketch Show (HBO); BET Awards (BET); History of the World, Part II (Hulu); Last Week Tonight with John Oliver (HBO); Personality Crisis: One Night Only (Showtime); Saturday Night Live (NBC); The Oscars (ABC); Ziwe (Showtime) |
| Best Game Show: Jeopardy! Masters (ABC); Celebrity Family Feud (ABC); Celebrity Jeopardy! (ABC); Family Feud (Syndicated); Let's Make a Deal (CBS); The Chase (ABC); The Price Is Right (CBS); Wheel of Fortune (Syndicated) | Best Streaming Reality or Competition Series: Love Is Blind (Netflix); Baking It (Peacock); Nailed It! (Netflix); Queer Eye (Netflix); RuPaul's Drag Race All Stars (Paramount+); Selena + Chef (Max); The Great American Baking Show (Roku); The Traitors (Peacock) |
| Best Cable Reality or Competition Series: RuPaul's Drag Race (MTV); Diners, Drive-Ins and Dives (Food Network); Married at First Sight (Lifetime); RuPaul's Drag Race: Untucked (MTV); Top Chef (Bravo); Top Chef: World All-Stars (Bravo); Vanderpump Rules (Bravo); Welcome to Wrexham (FX) | Best Broadcast Network Reality Show or Competition Series: MasterChef (Fox); Antiques Roadshow (PBS); Holey Moley (ABC); Lego Masters (Fox); Shark Tank (ABC); So You Think You Can Dance (Fox); The Amazing Race (CBS); The Masked Singer (Fox) |
| Best Broadcast Network or Cable Animated Series or Television Movie: South Park (Comedy Central); Family Guy (Fox); Rick and Morty (Adult Swim); The Simpsons (Fox) | Best Streaming Animated Series or TV Movie: Attack on Titan (Crunchyroll); Animaniacs (Hulu); Central Park (Apple TV+); Harley Quinn (Max); My Hero Academia (Crunchyroll); Star Trek: Lower Decks (Paramount+) |
Best Short Form Series: Carpool Karaoke: The Series (Apple TV+); Between the Scenes – The Daily Show (Comedy Central); I Think You Should Leave with Tim Robinson (Netflix); Only Murders in the Building: One Killer Question (Hulu); RuPaul's Drag Race's Whatcha Packin' with Michelle Visage (MTV); Succession: Controlling the Narrative (HBO); The Last of Us: Inside the Episode (HBO); The White Lotus: Unpacking the Episode (HBO)

=== Performance ===
| Best Guest Actor in a Drama Series: Nick Offerman – The Last of Us as Bill (HBO); Alan Cumming – The Good Fight as Eli Gold (Paramount+); Andy Serkis – Andor as Kino Loy (Disney+); Arian Moayed – Succession as Stewy Hosseini (HBO); Bradley Whitford – Law & Order: Special Victims Unit as Pence Humphreys (NBC); Bryan Cranston – Better Call Saul as Walter White (AMC); Giancarlo Esposito – The Mandalorian as Moff Gideon (Disney+); Murray Bartlett – The Last of Us as Frank (HBO); Paul Reiser – The Boys as The Legend (Prime Video); Timothy Dalton – The Crown as Peter Townsend (Netflix) | Best Guest Actress in a Drama Series: Regina Taylor – CSI: Vegas as Raquel Williams (CBS); Aya Cash – The Boys as Stormfront (Prime Video); Ella Purnell – Yellowjackets as Jackie Taylor (Showtime); Gwendoline Christie – The Sandman as Lucifer Morningstar (Netflix); Lizzo – The Mandalorian as The Duchess of Plazir-15 (Disney+); Mckenna Grace – The Handmaid's Tale as Esther Keyes (Hulu); Melanie Lynskey – The Last of Us as Kathleen Coghlan (HBO); Michelle Forbes – Star Trek: Picard as Commander Ro Laren (Paramount+); Tamara Clatterbuck – Will Trent as Kitty Treadwell (ABC); Vanessa Kirby – The Crown as Young Princess Margaret (Netflix) |
| Best Guest Actor in a Comedy Series: Pedro Pascal – Saturday Night Live as Host (NBC); Brad Pitt – Dave as Himself (FXX); James Marsden – Party Down as Jack Botty (Starz); Jon Bernthal – The Bear as Michael "Mikey" Berzatto (FX on Hulu); Leslie Odom Jr. – Abbott Elementary as Draemond Winding (ABC); Luke Kirby – The Marvelous Mrs. Maisel as Lenny Bruce (Prime Video); Matt Walsh – Ghosts as Elias Woodstone (CBS); Nick Kroll – What We Do in the Shadows as Simon the Devious (FX); Simon Helberg – Poker Face as Luca Clark (Peacock); Steve Martin and Martin Short – Saturday Night Live as Hosts (NBC) | Best Guest Actress in a Comedy Series: Ayo Edebiri – Abbott Elementary as Ayesha Teagues (ABC); Aubrey Plaza – Saturday Night Live as Host (NBC); Catherine Zeta-Jones – Wednesday as Morticia Addams (Netflix); D'Arcy Carden – Barry as Natalie Greer (HBO); Hong Chau – Poker Face as Marge (Peacock); Jane Lynch – The Marvelous Mrs. Maisel as Sophie Lennon (Prime Video); Jenna Ortega – Saturday Night Live as Host (NBC); Rachel McAdams – Dave as Herself (FXX); Stephanie Hsu – Poker Face as Mortimer "Morty" Bernstein (Peacock); Taraji P. Henson – Abbott Elementary as Vanetta Teagues (ABC) |

=== Technical ===
| Best Casting in a Drama Series: The Boys (Prime Video); Andor (Disney+); Bad Sisters (Apple TV+); New Amsterdam (NBC); Succession (HBO); The Company You Keep (ABC); The Crown (Netflix); The White Lotus (HBO); Will Trent (ABC); Yellowjackets (Showtime) | Best Casting in a Comedy Series: Ghosts (CBS); Abbott Elementary (ABC); American Born Chinese (Disney+); Barry (HBO); Not Dead Yet (ABC); Only Murders in the Building (Hulu); Party Down (Starz); The Bear (FX on Hulu); The Marvelous Mrs. Maisel (Prime Video); What We Do in the Shadows (FX) |
| Best Casting in a Limited Series or TV Movie: Weird: The Al Yankovic Story (Roku); Accused (Fox); A Small Light (Nat Geo); Beef (Netflix); Black Bird (Apple TV+); Dahmer – Monster: The Jeffrey Dahmer Story (Netflix); Daisy Jones & the Six (Prime Video); Documentary Now! (IFC); George & Tammy (Showtime); White House Plumbers (HBO) | Best Contemporary Costumes: RuPaul's Drag Race (MTV); Only Murders in the Building (Hulu); Poker Face (Peacock); The Last of Us (HBO); The White Lotus (HBO); Yellowjackets (Showtime) |
| Best Fantasy or Science Fiction Costumes: Wednesday (Netflix); Andor (Disney+); House of the Dragon (HBO); The Boys (Prime Video); The Lord of the Rings: The Rings of Power (Prime Video); The Mandalorian (Disney+) | Best Period Costumes: The Crown (Netflix); A League of Their Own (Prime Video); Queen Charlotte: A Bridgerton Story (Netflix); Schmigadoon! (Apple TV+); The Coroner's Assistant (YouTube); The Marvelous Mrs. Maisel (Prime Video) |
| Best Stunts: The Boys (Prime Video); 9-1-1 (Fox); Andor (Disney+); House of the Dragon (HBO); She-Hulk: Attorney at Law (Disney+); The Mandalorian (Disney+) | Best Main Title Design: Only Murders in the Building (Hulu); House of the Dragon (HBO); P-Valley (Starz); Shrinking (Apple TV+); The Last of Us (HBO); Wednesday (Netflix) |
Best Original Song: "Your Personal Trash Man Can" from The Marvelous Mrs. Maisel (Prime Video); "Get It On the Floor" from P-Valley (Starz); "Look at Us Now" from Daisy Jones & the Six (Prime Video); "Now You Know" from Weird: The Al Yankovic Story (Roku); "The River" from Daisy Jones & the Six (Prime Video); "Talk to Daddy" from Schmigadoon! (Apple TV+)

== Most wins ==
Wins by series
| Nominations | Series |
|---|---|
| 2 | The Boys |
| 2 | RuPaul's Drag Race |

Wins by network/platform
| Nominations | Network/Platform |
|---|---|
| 4 | Prime Video |
| 3 | HBO |
| 3 | Netflix |
| 2 | ABC |
| 2 | Apple TV+ |
| 2 | CBS |
| 2 | Comedy Central |
| 2 | MTV |

== Most nominations ==
Nominations by series
| Nominations | Series |
|---|---|
| 6 | The Last of Us |
| 5 | Saturday Night Live |
| 5 | The Boys |
| 5 | The Marvelous Mrs. Maisel |
| 4 | Abbott Elementary |
| 4 | Andor |
| 4 | Only Murders in the Building |
| 4 | Poker Face |
| 4 | The Crown |
| 4 | The Mandalorian |
| 3 | Daisy Jones & the Six |
| 3 | House of the Dragon |
| 3 | Succession |
| 3 | The White Lotus |
| 3 | Wednesday |
| 3 | Yellowjackets |
| 2 | Barry |
| 2 | Dave |
| 2 | Ghosts |
| 2 | Party Down |
| 2 | P-Valley |
| 2 | RuPaul's Drag Race |
| 2 | Schmigadoon! |
| 2 | The Bear |
| 2 | Weird: The Al Yankovic Story |
| 2 | What We Do in the Shadows |
| 2 | Will Trent |

Nominations by network/platform
| Nominations | Network/Platform |
|---|---|
| 22 | HBO |
| 17 | Netflix |
| 16 | ABC |
| 16 | Prime Video |
| 13 | Apple TV+ |
| 11 | Disney+ |
| 8 | Fox |
| 8 | Hulu |
| 7 | CBS |
| 7 | NBC |
| 7 | Peacock |
| 7 | Showtime |
| 6 | MTV |
| 4 | FX |
| 4 | Paramount+ |
| 4 | Starz |
| 3 | Bravo |
| 3 | Comedy Central |
| 3 | Max |
| 3 | Roku |
| 2 | CNN |
| 2 | Crunchyroll |
| 2 | FX on Hulu |
| 2 | FXX |
| 2 | PBS |
| 2 | Syndicated |
