= Humans of New York: The Series =

2017 American TV series

- Genre: Reality; Docuseries
- Created by: Brandon Stanton
- Based on: Humans of New York by Brandon Stanton
- Composers: Oddisee; T. Griffin
- Country of origin: United States
- Original language: English
- No. of seasons: 1
- No. of episodes: 13

Production
- Executive producers: Brandon Stanton; Julie Goldman; Christopher Clements; Carolyn Hepburn
- Producer: Michael Crommett
- Cinematography: Michael Crommett
- Editors: Brandon Stanton; Michael Peterson
- Running time: 13–24 minutes
- Production companies: Motto Pictures; Unsold Productions

Original release
- Network: Facebook Watch
- Release: August 29 – November 16, 2017

Humans of New York: The Series is an American documentary web series that premiered on November 14, 2017 on Facebook Watch. Based on the popular internet blog, the show includes intimate and candid conversations with strangers on the streets of New York City.

== Production ==
Stanton began production on the show in June 2014 and has amassed over 400 days worth of filming and interviewed more than 1,200 people. He made the decision to partner with Facebook after realizing that two-thirds of his audience lives outside the United States, and that Facebook has global reach unavailable most anywhere else.

Stanton partnered with documentary producer Julie Goldman on the series after she had screened some of the footage he had already shot.

== Episodes ==
No.	Title	Original release date
1	"Time"	August 29, 2017
2	"Star"	August 29, 2017
3	"Home"	September 7, 2017
4	"Relationships"	September 14, 2017
5	"Purpose"	September 21, 2017
6	"Mission"	September 28, 2017
7	"Parenting"	October 5, 2017
8	"Help"	October 12, 2017
9	"Money"	October 19, 2017
10	"Imagination"	October 26, 2017
11	"Forgiveness"	November 2, 2017
12	"Independence"	November 9, 2017
13	"Connection"	November 16, 2017

== Reception ==
Humans of New York: The Series has been met with a generally positive reception from critics upon its release. Vogue writer Mary Wang praised the show for revealing "that plot twists aren’t the most important part of a good story—what matters are the humans behind it." Margaret Lyons of The New York Times described the series in positive terms: "It's poignancy on steroids, in that it’s very powerful..." The Week critic Sarah Marshall compared the show favorably to the blog it's based upon when commenting that the series "remains ephemeral, glancing, a flaneur's view of the city: people appearing, showing themselves to you, and then disappearing again." In a more mixed review, Maeve Dunigan of the University of Maryland's independent school newspaper The Diamondback, mentioned that she wished the show had taken more risks and "that Stanton had played with his idea a little more, allowing the videos to stand on their own without seeming like a direct copy of his former work."

== See also ==
- List of original programs distributed by Facebook Watch
