= Satellite Award for Best Documentary Film =

Annual film award

Satellite Award for Best Documentary
- Awarded for: Best Documentary
- Country: United States
- Presented by: International Press Academy
- First award: 1997 (awarded to 4 Little Girls)
- Currently held by: Super/Man: The Christopher Reeve Story (2024)

The Satellite Award for Best Documentary Film is an annual award given by the International Press Academy.

== Winners and nominees ==
=== 1990s ===
Year	Film	Director(s)
1997	4 Little Girls	Spike Lee
1997	Fast, Cheap & Out of Control	Errol Morris
1997	Hype!	Doug Pray
1997	Shooting Porn	Ronnie Larsen
1997	Sick: The Life and Death of Bob Flanagan, Supermasochist	Kirby Dick
1998	Ayn Rand: A Sense of Life	Michael Paxton
1998	The Cruise	Bennett Miller
1998	The Farm: Angola, USA	Liz Garbus, Wilbert Rideau, Jonathan Stack
1998	Kurt & Courtney	Nick Broomfield
1998	Public Housing	Frederick Wiseman
1999	Buena Vista Social Club	Wim Wenders
1999	42: Forty Two Up	Michael Apted
1999	American Movie	Chris Smith
1999	Mr. Death: The Rise and Fall of Fred A. Leuchter, Jr.	Errol Morris
1999	Return with Honor	Freida Lee Mock, Terry Sanders
1999	The Source	Chuck Workman

=== 2000s ===
Year	Film	Director(s)
2000	Reckless Indifference	William Gazecki
2000	Captured on Film: The True Story of Marion Davies	Hugh Munro Neely
2000	Dark Days	Marc Singer
2000	The Eyes of Tammy Faye	Fenton Bailey, Randy Barbato
2000	Into the Arms of Strangers: Stories of the Kindertransport	Mark Jonathan Harris
2000	One Day in September	Kevin Macdonald
2001	In Cane for Life (A Vida em Cana)	Jorge W. Atalla
2001	Calle 54	Fernando Trueba
2001	My Voyage to Italy (Il mio viaggio in Italia)	Martin Scorsese
2001	Stanley Kubrick: A Life in Pictures	Jan Harlan
2002	The Kid Stays in the Picture	Nanette Burstein, Brett Morgen
2002	Biggie and Tupac	Nick Broomfield
2002	Bowling for Columbine	Michael Moore
2002	The Cockettes	Bill Weber, David Weissman
2002	Dogtown and Z-Boys	Stacy Peralta
2003	Amandla!: A Revolution in Four-Part Harmony	Lee Hirsch
2003	Capturing the Friedmans	Andrew Jarecki
2003	The Fog of War: Eleven Lessons from the Life of Robert S. McNamara	Errol Morris
2003	Lost in La Mancha	Keith Fulton, Louis Pepe
2003	My Flesh and Blood	Jonathan Karsh
2003	Stevie	Steve James
2004	Super Size Me	Morgan Spurlock
2004	Born into Brothels: Calcutta's Red Light Kids	Zana Briski, Ross Kauffman
2004	The Fuente Family: An American Dream	James Orr
2004	Lightning in a Bottle	Antoine Fuqua
2004	Touching the Void	Kevin Macdonald
2004	Tupac: Resurrection	Lauren Lazin
2005	Mad Hot Ballroom	Marilyn Agrelo
2005	Enron: The Smartest Guys in the Room	Alex Gibney
2005	Favela Rising	Matt Mochary, Jeff Zimbalist
2005	March of the Penguins (La marche de l'empereur)	Luc Jacquet
2005	Murderball	Henry Alex Rubin, Dana Adam Shapiro
2005	New York Doll	Greg Whiteley
2006	Deliver Us from Evil	Amy Berg
2006	An Inconvenient Truth	David Guggenheim
2006	Jonestown: The Life and Death of Peoples Temple	Stanley Nelson
2006	Leonard Cohen: I'm Your Man	Lian Lunson
2006	The U.S. vs. John Lennon	David Leaf, John Scheinfeld
2006	The War Tapes	Deborah Scranton
2007	Sicko	Michael Moore
2007	The 11th Hour	Nadia Conners, Leila Conners
2007	Darfur Now	Ted Braun
2007	The King of Kong	Seth Gordon
2007	Lake of Fire	Tony Kaye
2007	No End in Sight	Charles Ferguson
2008	Anita O'Day: The Life of a Jazz Singer	Robbie Cavolina, Ian McCrudden
2008	Man on Wire	James Marsh
2008	Encounters at the End of the World	Werner Herzog
2008	Pray the Devil Back to Hell	Gini Reticker
2008	Religulous	Larry Charles
2008	Waltz with Bashir (Vals im Bashir)	Ari Folman
2009	Every Little Step	James D. Stern, Adam Del Deo
2009	The Beaches of Agnès	Agnès Varda
2009	The Cove	Louie Psihoyos
2009	It Might Get Loud	Davis Guggenheim
2009	The September Issue	R.J. Cutler
2009	Valentino: The Last Emperor	Matt Tyrnauer

=== 2010s ===
Year	Film	Director(s)
2010	Restrepo	Sebastian Junger, Tim Hetherington
2010	Behind the Burly Q	Leslie Zemeckis
2010	Client 9: The Rise and Fall of Eliot Spitzer	Alex Gibney
2010	Countdown to Zero	Lucy Walker
2010	A Film Unfinished	Yael Hersonski
2010	Inside Job	Charles Ferguson
2010	Joan Rivers: A Piece of Work	Ricki Stern, Anne Sundberg
2010	Sequestro	Jorge Wolney Atalla Junior
2010	The Tillman Story	Amir Bar-Lev
2010	Waiting for "Superman"	Davis Guggenheim
2011	Senna	Asif Kapadia
2011	American: The Bill Hicks Story	Matt Harlock, Paul Thomas
2011	Cave of Forgotten Dreams	Werner Herzog
2011	The Interrupters	Steve James
2011	My Perestroika	Robin Hessman
2011	One Lucky Elephant	Lisa Leeman
2011	Pina	Wim Wenders
2011	Project Nim	James Marsh
2011	Tabloid	Errol Morris
2011	Under Fire: Journalists in Combat	Martyn Burke
2012	Chasing Ice	Jeff Orlowski
2012	Ai Weiwei: Never Sorry	Alison Klayman
2012	The Central Park Five	Ken Burns, Sarah Burns, David McMahon
2012	The Gatekeepers	Dror Moreh
2012	Marina Abramović: The Artist is Present	Matthew Akers
2012	The Pruitt-Igoe Myth	Chad Freidrichs
2012	Searching for Sugar Man	Malik Bendjelloul
2012	West of Memphis	Amy J. Berg
2013	Blackfish	Gabriela Cowperthwaite
2013	20 Feet from Stardom	Morgan Neville
2013	The Act of Killing	Joshua Oppenheimer
2013	After Tiller	Martha Shane, Lana Wilson
2013	American Promise	Joe Brewster, Michèle Stephenson
2013	Évocateur: The Morton Downey Jr. Movie	Seth Kramer, Daniel A. Miller, Jeremy Newberger
2013	Sound City	Dave Grohl
2013	The Square	Jehane Noujaim
2013	Stories We Tell	Sarah Polley
2013	Tim's Vermeer	Teller
2014	Citizenfour	Laura Poitras
2014	Afternoon of a Faun: Tanaquil Le Clercq	Nancy Buirski
2014	Art and Craft	Sam Cullman, Jennifer Grausman
2014	Finding Vivian Maier	John Maloof, Charlie Siskel
2014	Glen Campbell: I'll Be Me	James Keach
2014	Jodorowsky's Dune	Frank Pavich
2014	Keep on Keepin' On	Alan Hicks
2014	Magician: The Astonishing Life and Work of Orson Welles	Chuck Workman
2014	Red Army	Gabe Polsky
2014	Virunga	Orlando von Einsiedel
2015	Amy	Asif Kapadia
2015	The Look of Silence	Joshua Oppenheimer
2015	Becoming Bulletproof	Michael Barnett
2015	Best of Enemies	Robert Gordon, Morgan Neville
2015	Cartel Land	Matthew Heineman
2015	Going Clear: Scientology and the Prison of Belief	Alex Gibney
2015	He Named Me Malala	Davis Guggenheim
2015	The Hunting Ground	Kirby Dick
2015	National Lampoon: Drunk Stoned Brilliant Dead	Douglas Tirola
2015	Where to Invade Next	Michael Moore
2016	13th	Ava DuVernay
2016	The Beatles: Eight Days a Week	Ron Howard
2016	The Eagle Huntress	Otto Bell
2016	Fire at Sea	Gianfranco Rosi
2016	Gleason	Clay Tweel
2016	The Ivory Game	Richard Ladkani, Kief Davidson
2016	Life, Animated	Roger Ross Williams
2016	O.J.: Made in America	Ezra Edelman
2016	Tower	Keith Maitland
2016	Zero Days	Alex Gibney
2017	Chasing Coral	Jeff Orlowski
2017	City of Ghosts	Matthew Heineman
2017	Cries from Syria	Evgeny Afineevsky
2017	Ex Libris: The New York Public Library	Frederick Wiseman
2017	Hell on Earth: The Fall of Syria and the Rise of ISIS	Sebastian Junger, Nick Quested
2017	Human Flow	Ai Weiwei
2017	Icarus	Bryan Fogel
2017	Kedi	Ceyda Torun
2017	Legion of Brothers	Greg Barker
2018	Minding the Gap	Bing Liu
2018	Crime + Punishment	Stephen Maing
2018	Free Solo	Elizabeth Chai Vasarhelyi, Jimmy Chin
2018	RBG	Betsy West, Julie Cohen
2018	Three Identical Strangers	Tim Wardle
2018	Won't You Be My Neighbor?	Morgan Neville
2019	63 Up	Michael Apted
2019	The Apollo	Roger Ross Williams
2019	Apollo 11	Todd Douglas Miller
2019	The Cave	Feras Fayyad
2019	Citizen K	Alex Gibney
2019	For Sama	Waad Al-Kateab, Edward Watts
2019	Honeyland	Tamara Kotevska, Ljubomir Stefanov
2019	One Child Nation	Nanfu Wang, Jialing Zhang

=== 2020s ===
Year	Film	Director(s)
2020	Collective	Alexander Nanau
2020	Acasă, My Home	Radu Ciorniciuc
2020	Circus of Books	Rachel Mason
2020	Coup 53	Rachel Mason
2020	Crip Camp	Nicole Newnham, James Lebrecht
2020	The Dissident	Bryan Fogel
2020	Gunda	Viktor Kossakovsky
2020	MLK/FBI	Sam Pollard
2020	A Most Beautiful Thing	Mary Mazzio
2020	The Truffle Hunters	Michael Dweck, Gregory Kershaw
2021	Summer of Soul (...Or, When the Revolution Could Not Be Televised)	Amir "Questlove" Thompson
2021	Ascension	Jessica Kingdon
2021	Brian Wilson: Long Promised Road	Brent Wilson
2021	Flee	Jonas Poher Rasmussen
2021	Introducing, Selma Blair	Rachel Fleit
2021	Julia	Julie Cohen and Betsy West
2021	Procession	Robert Greene
2021	The Rescue	Elizabeth Chai Vasarhelyi and Jimmy Chin
2021	Val	Leo Scott and Ting Poo
2021	The Velvet Underground	Todd Haynes
2022	Fire of Love	Sara Dosa
2022	All That Breathes	Shaunak Sen
2022	All the Beauty and the Bloodshed	Laura Poitras
2022	Descendant	Margaret Brown
2022	Good Night Oppy	Ryan White
2022	Moonage Daydream	Brett Morgen
2022	The Return of Tanya Tucker: Featuring Brandi Carlile	Kathlyn Horan
2022	The Territory	Alex Pritz
2022	Young Plato	Declan McGrath, Neasa Ní Chianáin
2023	Bad Press	Rebecca Landsberry-Baker and Joe Peeler
2023	20 Days in Mariupol	Mstyslav Chernov
2023	American Symphony	Matthew Heineman
2023	Close to Vermeer	Suzanne Raes
2023	Lakota Nation vs. United States	Jesse Short Bull and Laura Tomaselli
2023	Little Richard: I Am Everything	Lisa Cortés
2023	Love to Love You, Donna Summer	Roger Ross Williams and Brooklyn Sudano
2023	Stamped from the Beginning	Roger Ross Williams
2024	Super/Man: The Christopher Reeve Story	Ian Bonhôte and Peter Ettedgui
2024	The Bloody Hundredth	Laurent Bouzereau and Mark Herzog
2024	Dahomey	Mati Diop
2024	Elizabeth Taylor: The Lost Tapes	Nanette Burstein
2024	I Am: Celine Dion	Irene Taylor
2024	No Other Land	Basel Adra, Hamdan Ballal, Yuval Abraham, and Rachel Szor
2024	Porcelain War	Brendan Bellomo and Slava Leontyev
2024	Sugarcane	Julian Brave NoiseCat and Emily Kassie
2025	Becoming Led Zeppelin	Bernard MacMahon
2025	2000 Meters to Andriivka	Mstyslav Chernov
2025	The Alabama Solution	Andrew Jarecki and Charlotte Kaufman
2025	Come See Me in the Good Light	Ryan White
2025	Cover-Up	Laura Poitras and Mark Obenhaus
2025	Deaf President Now!	Nyle DiMarco and Davis Guggenheim
2025	The Librarians	Kim A. Snyder
2025	Ocean with David Attenborough	Toby Nowlan, Colin Butfield, and Keith Scholey
2025	Orwell: 2+2=5	Raoul Peck
2025	The Perfect Neighbor	Geeta Gandbhir

== Multiple wins ==
- Asif Kapadia-2 (one tied with Joshua Oppenheimer)
- Jeff Orlowski-2

== See also ==
- Academy Award for Best Documentary Feature
- Independent Spirit Award for Best Documentary Feature
