= The Return of Tanya Tucker: Featuring Brandi Carlile =

- Theatrical release poster
- Directed by: Kathlyn Horan
- Produced by: Kathlyn Horan; Julie Goldman; Christopher Clements; Carolyn Hepburn
- Cinematography: Jessica Young
- Edited by: Brady Hammes
- Music by: Tanya Tucker; Brandi Carlile; Phil Hanseroth; Tim Hanseroth
- Production companies: Motto Pictures; Impact Partners; Artemis Rising Foundation; TinFish Films; Fit Via Vi
- Distributed by: Sony Pictures Classics
- Release dates: March 13, 2022 (SXSW); October 21, 2022 (United States)
- Running time: 108 minutes
- Country: United States
- Language: English
- Box office: $93,275

The Return of Tanya Tucker: Featuring Brandi Carlile is a 2022 American documentary film, directed and co-produced by Kathlyn Horan. It follows Tanya Tucker returning to the studio to record her first album in 10 years, While I'm Livin', collaborating with Brandi Carlile.

The documentary film had its world premiere at South by Southwest on March 13, 2022, and was released in the United States on October 21, 2022, by Sony Pictures Classics. It became available on Blu Ray, DVD and digital on Jan 10, 2023.

== Plot ==
Decades after Tanya Tucker slipped from the spotlight, music star Brandi Carlile writes an entire album for her hero based on Tanya's extraordinary life, spurring the greatest comeback in country music history.

== Awards ==
• SXSW Audience Award - Winner

• Hollywood Music in Media Awards - “Ready As I’ll Never Be” - Best Song, Documentary - Winner (Tanya Tucker & Brandi Carlile)

• Satellite Award for Best Documentary Film - Nominee

• Guild of Music Supervisors Award - Best Song Written and/or Recorded for a Film - Nominee (Ready as I’ll Never Be - Tanya Tucker/Brandi Carlile)

• Music City Film Critics - Jim Ridley Award - Nominee

• Woodstock Film Festival - Best Editing - Winner

• Critics Choice Documentary Awards - Best Music Documentary - Nominee

• Cleveland International Film Festival - Best Documentary - Nominee

== Release ==
The film had its world premiere at South by Southwest on March 13, 2022. Shortly after, Sony Pictures Classics acquired distribution rights to the film. The film was screened at the 2022 Toronto International Film Festival on September 12, 2022 and was released on October 21, 2022.

The film was accompanied by the song "Ready as I'll Never Be", which was written by Tucker and Carlile. The song was subsequently included on Tucker's album Sweet Western Sound.

The movie was added to Netflix US on October 1, 2023.

== Reception ==
The Return of Tanya Tucker: Featuring Brandi Carlile received positive reviews from film critics. On Rotten Tomatoes it has a 92% approval rating based on reviews from 48 critics. The website's consensus reads, "Lengthy title notwithstanding, The Return of Tanya Tucker: Featuring Brandi Carlile pays affectionate tribute to the powerful purity of both artists' music."
