= Chicago Film Critics Association Award for Best Documentary =

Annual US film award

The Chicago Film Critics Association Awards for Best Documentary is an annual award given by the Chicago Film Critics Association since 2000.

== Winners and Nominees ==
| Year | Winner | Nominees |
|---|---|---|
| 2000 | The Filth and the Fury; The Life and Times of Hank Greenberg | |
| 2001 | The Endurance: Shackleton's Legendary Antarctic Expedition | |
| 2002 | Bowling for Columbine | |
| 2003 | The Fog of War | |
| 2004 | Fahrenheit 9/11 | |
| 2005 | Grizzly Man | |
| 2006 | An Inconvenient Truth | |
| 2007 | Sicko | Darfur Now; The King of Kong: A Fistful of Quarters; Lake of Fire; No End in Sight |
| 2008 | Man on Wire | American Teen; Dear Zachary: A Letter to a Son About His Father; I.O.U.S.A. Standard Operating Procedure |
| 2009 | Anvil! The Story of Anvil | Capitalism: A Love Story; The Cove; Food, Inc. Tyson |
| 2010 | Exit Through the Gift Shop | Inside Job; Restrepo; The Tillman Story; Waiting for "Superman" |
| 2011 | The Interrupters | Cave of Forgotten Dreams; Into the Abyss; Pina; Project Nim; Tabloid |
| 2012 | The Invisible War | The Central Park Five; The Queen of Versailles; Searching for Sugar Man; West of Memphis |
| 2013 | The Act of Killing | 20 Feet from Stardom; The Armstrong Lie; Blackfish; Stories We Tell |
| 2014 | Life Itself | Citizenfour; Jodorowsky's Dune; Last Days in Vietnam; The Overnighters |
| 2015 | Amy | Cartel Land; The Hunting Ground; The Look of Silence; Where to Invade Next |
| 2016 | O.J.: Made in America | Cameraperson; Life, Animated; Tower; Weiner |
| 2017 | Jane | Abacus: Small Enough to Jail; Ex Libris: The New York Public Library; Faces Places; Kedi |
| 2018 | Minding the Gap | Free Solo; RBG; Three Identical Strangers; Won't You Be My Neighbor? |
| 2019 | Apollo 11 | American Factory; For Sama; Hail Satan? Honeyland |
| 2020 | Dick Johnson Is Dead | Collective; David Byrne's American Utopia; The Social Dilemma; Time |
| 2021 | Summer of Soul | Flee; Procession; The Sparks Brothers; The Velvet Underground |
| 2022 | Fire of Love | All the Beauty and the Bloodshed; Bad Axe; Descendant; Moonage Daydream |

== See also ==
- Academy Award for Best Documentary Feature
