= Ghosts of Beirut =

American television series

- Genre: Espionage thriller
- Created by: Avi Issacharoff; Lior Raz; Greg Barker
- Screenplay by: Joëlle Touma; Greg Barker; Avi Issacharoff; Lior Raz
- Directed by: Greg Barker
- Starring: Dermot Mulroney; Dina Shihabi; Garret Dillahunt; Iddo Goldberg; Ty Wood; Hisham Suleiman; Amir Khoury
- Original language: English
- No. of series: 1
- No. of episodes: 4

Production
- Executive producers: Greg Barker; Daniel Driefuss; Joëlle Touma; Vinnie Molhotra
- Cinematography: Kolja Brandt
- Editor: Mathew Woolley
- Production company: Hidden Truth Films

Original release
- Network: Showtime
- Release: May 19 – June 11, 2023

Ghosts of Beirut is a four-part espionage thriller television series that debuted on Showtime on May 19, 2023.

== Synopsis ==
Ghosts of Beirut follows the decades-long international pursuit of Imad Mughniyeh by intelligence agencies, including the Central Intelligence Agency and Mossad. Blending dramatized scenes with documentary-style interviews, the series traces efforts to track him across multiple countries over many years. The narrative culminates in the covert operation that led to his assassination in Damascus on February 12, 2008.

== Cast ==
- Dermot Mulroney as Robert Ames
- Dina Shihabi as Lena Asayran
- Iddo Goldberg as Teddy, Nadia's partner
- Hisham Suleiman as Imad Mughniyeh
  - Amir Khoury as younger Imad Mughniyeh
- Farida Bouaazaoui as Saada Badreddine
  - Hiba Bennani as younger Saada Badreddine
- Salim Benmoussa as Mustafa Badreddine
- Zineb Triki as Wafa
- Ty Wood as Rani El-Haddad
- Rafi Gavron as Chet
- Garret Dillahunt as William Buckley
- Robert Kazinsky as Steve
- Ned Bellamy as William Casey
- Navid Negahban as Ali-Reza Asgari
  - Omar Lotfi as younger Ali-Reza Asgari
- Billy Smith as Duane Clarridge
- Tzahi Grad as Meir Dagan
  - Michael Moshonov as younger Meir Dagan
- Yaakov Zada Daniel as Mossad Commander
- Yuval Scharf as Sarah
- Soufiane El Khalidy as Kerem
- Neta Riskin as Nadia, Teddy's partner

== Production ==
The show is created by Avi Issacharoff, Lior Raz and Greg Barker, and directed by Greg Barker. It is executive produced by Daniel Dreifuss and Barker. The script writer is Joëlle Touma who was also co-executive producer, alongside co-executive producers Padriac McKinley and Diane Becker. The series includes documentary elements with real-life interviews with prominent officials from the CIA and Mossad.

== Broadcast ==
The series aired on Showtime from May 19, 2023.
