= Selena y Los Dinos (film) =

- Release poster
- Directed by: Isabel Castro
- Produced by: Julie Goldman; Christopher Clements; J. Daniel Torres; David Blackman; Simran A. Singh
- Cinematography: Lorena Duran
- Edited by: Carolina Siraqyan
- Production companies: Motto Pictures; AMSI Entertainment; PolyGram Entertainment
- Distributed by: Netflix
- Release dates: January 26, 2025 (Sundance); November 17, 2025
- Running time: 117 minutes
- Country: United States
- Languages: English; Spanish

Selena y Los Dinos is a 2025 American documentary film, directed by Isabel Castro. It follows the life and impact of Selena and her beginnings with Los Dinos.

It had its world premiere at the Sundance Film Festival on January 26, 2025. It was released on November 17, 2025, by Netflix, and received positive reviews from critics.

== Premise ==
Explores the life and impact of Selena, told through never-before-seen footage and photographs.

== Production ==
Suzette Quintanilla and A.B. Quintanilla serve as executive producers, wanting to make the film to continue Selena's legacy. Hundreds, if not thousands of hours of footage were combed through for the film at Q-Productions, with Isabel Castro and J. Daniel Torres visiting over ten times to catalog.

== Release ==
It had its world premiere at the Sundance Film Festival on January 26, 2025, where the film won the U.S. Documentary Special Jury Award for Archival Storytelling. In February 2025, Netflix was in the lead to acquire distribution rights to the film with a $6–7 million offer, amidst a bidding war. In May 2025, Netflix officially acquired the film. It also screened at South by Southwest in March 2025. It was released on November 17, 2025.

== Reception ==
On the review aggregator website Rotten Tomatoes, 95% of 22 critics' reviews are positive. Metacritic, which uses a weighted average, assigned the film a score of 65 out of 100, based on five critics, indicating "generally favorable" reviews.
