= The Velvet Underground (film) =

2021 documentary film by Todd Haynes

- Release poster
- Directed by: Todd Haynes
- Produced by: Todd Haynes; Christine Vachon; Julie Goldman; Carolyn Hepburn; Christopher Clements; David Blackman
- Cinematography: Edward Lachman
- Edited by: Affonso Gonçalves; Adam Kurnitz
- Production companies: PolyGram Entertainment; Motto Pictures; Killer Films; Federal Films
- Distributed by: Apple TV+
- Release dates: July 7, 2021 (Cannes); October 15, 2021 (United States)
- Running time: 110 minutes
- Country: United States
- Language: English

The Velvet Underground is a 2021 American documentary film directed and produced by Todd Haynes that chronicles the life and times of the rock band the Velvet Underground.

The film premiered at the Cannes Film Festival on July 7, 2021. It was released theatrically and on Apple TV+ on October 15, 2021, to critical acclaim.

== Synopsis ==
The Velvet Underground was an influential band that arose from the music, art, and film avant-gardes of early-1960s New York City. Although not a commercial success at the time, it had a significant impact on underground, experimental, and alternative music and the development of punk and new wave music. Its core members were Lou Reed, Sterling Morrison, John Cale, Doug Yule, and Maureen Tucker. Artist Andy Warhol managed and promoted the band—convincing them to add German singer and model Nico to their line-up. Haynes's film examines the cultural milieu of the band and its musical and cinematic influences. It tracks the band's history from formation to the break-up of its original line-up in the early 1970s. Interviews with surviving band members Cale and Tucker and musicians the band influenced are woven with archival music and film material.

== Production ==
In August 2017, Todd Haynes was hired to direct and produce a documentary film about the Velvet Underground. Haynes received cooperation of the surviving members of the band including founding members John Cale and Maureen Tucker. Interviews for the film were shot in 2018. Doug Yule, who replaced Cale in the band in 1968, appears in voiceover but was not filmed.

== Release ==
In October 2020, Apple TV+ acquired distribution rights to the film. It had its world premiere at the Cannes Film Festival on July 7, 2021. It was released theatrically and on Apple TV+ on October 15, 2021. On December 13, 2022, it was released on DVD and Blu-ray by The Criterion Collection.

== Reception ==
=== Critical response ===
On the review aggregator website Rotten Tomatoes, the film holds an approval rating of 98% based on 132 reviews, with an average rating of 8.1/10. The website's critics consensus reads, "The Velvet Underground takes a fittingly idiosyncratic approach to delivering a rock documentary that captures the band as well as its era." On Metacritic, the film has a weighted score of 87 out of 100 based on 31 critics, indicating "universal acclaim".

Some critics felt the documentary glossed over the band's 1969 self-titled album and contributions by Yule.

=== Accolades ===
Award	Date of ceremony	Category	Recipient(s)	Result	Ref.
ACE Eddie Awards	March 5, 2022	Best Edited Documentary (Feature)	Affonso Gonçalves and Adam Kurnitz	Nominated	
Austin Film Critics Association Awards	January 11, 2022	Best Documentary	The Velvet Underground	Nominated	
Boston Society of Film Critics Awards	December 12, 2021	Best Editing	Affonso Gonçalves and Adam Kurnitz	Won	
Chicago Film Critics Association Awards	December 15, 2021	Best Documentary	The Velvet Underground	Nominated	
Cinema Audio Society Awards	March 19, 2022	Outstanding Achievement in Sound Mixing for a Motion Picture – Documentary	Juliana Henao Mesa and Leslie Shatz	Nominated	
Cinema Eye Honors	March 1, 2022	Outstanding Non-Fiction Feature	Todd Haynes, Christine Vachon, Julie Goldman, Christopher Clements, and Carolyn Hepburn	Nominated	
Cinema Eye Honors	March 1, 2022	Audience Choice Prize	Todd Haynes	Nominated	
Cinema Eye Honors	March 1, 2022	Outstanding Editing	Affonso Gonçalves and Adam Kurnitz	Nominated	
Cinema Eye Honors	March 1, 2022	Outstanding Sound Design	Leslie Shatz and Jahn Sood	Won	
Critics' Choice Documentary Awards	November 14, 2021	Best First Documentary Feature	Todd Haynes	Nominated	
Critics' Choice Documentary Awards	November 14, 2021	Best Editing	Affonso Gonçalves and Adam Kurnitz	Nominated	
Critics' Choice Documentary Awards	November 14, 2021	Best Archival Documentary	The Velvet Underground	Nominated	
Critics' Choice Documentary Awards	November 14, 2021	Best Music Documentary	The Velvet Underground	Nominated	
Dorian Awards	March 17, 2022	Best Documentary	The Velvet Underground	Nominated	
Hollywood Music in Media Awards	November 17, 2021	Best Music Supervision – Film	Randall Poster	Nominated	
IDA Documentary Awards	March 4, 2022	Best Music Documentary	Todd Haynes, Christine Vachon, Julie Goldman, Christopher Clements, Carolyn Hepburn, and David Blackman	Nominated	
London Film Critics' Circle Awards	February 6, 2022	Documentary of the Year	The Velvet Underground	Nominated	
Motion Picture Sound Editors Golden Reel Awards	March 13, 2022	Outstanding Achievement in Sound Editing – Feature Documentary	Leslie Shatz and Jahn Sood	Nominated	
National Society of Film Critics Awards	January 8, 2022	Best Non-Fiction Film	The Velvet Underground	Runner-up	
Online Film Critics Society Awards	January 24, 2022	Best Documentary	The Velvet Underground	Nominated	
San Diego Film Critics Society Awards	January 10, 2022	Best Documentary	The Velvet Underground	Nominated	
San Francisco Bay Area Film Critics Circle Awards	January 10, 2022	Best Documentary Feature	The Velvet Underground	Won	
Satellite Awards	April 2, 2022	Best Motion Picture, Documentary	The Velvet Underground	Nominated	
St. Louis Film Critics Association Awards	December 19, 2021	Best Documentary Film	The Velvet Underground	Nominated	
Toronto Film Critics Association Awards	January 16, 2022	Allan King Documentary Award	The Velvet Underground	Runner-up	
