= Corey Hébert =

American physician and journalist

Corey Hébert on set at the WDSU-TV studio in New Orleans

Corey Hébert is an American physician, Emmy-nominated medical broadcast journalist, and educator practicing in New Orleans, Louisiana, and is the Chief Medical Correspondent for WWL-TV, the CBS Affiliate for New Orleans and the Gulf Coast. He is an associate professor in private practice at Louisiana State University Health Sciences Center and Tulane University. Hébert is also the Chief Medical Officer of Emmaus Life Sciences, a publicly traded pharmaceutical corporation.

Hébert was the first and only Chief Medical Editor/Correspondent for Black News Channel (BNC) and is the chief executive officer of Community Health TV and College Health TV. Hebert was previously the on-air Chief Medical Editor for WDSU, the NBC television affiliate New Orleans and the Gulf Coast, and for Hearst-Argyle Broadcasting for over 17 years. Hebert was also an on-air expert for the Dr. Oz show for 11 years. He is the former Chief Medical Officer for the New Orleans Public School District (NOPS) as well as the medical director of the Louisiana Recovery School District. He is the Chief Medical Officer of Dillard University.

== Early life ==
Hébert was born in Baton Rouge, Louisiana on November 4, 1969. He was educated in the Baton Rouge area, including Catholic High School. He holds a Bachelor of Science degree from Morehouse College in Atlanta, Georgia, and earned his medical degree from Meharry Medical College in Nashville, Tennessee. Upon graduation he did his internship and residency at Tulane University Medical Center and Charity Hospital of New Orleans. Hébert was chosen as Chief Resident of Pediatrics in 2000 at Tulane Medical Center which made him the first African American to hold that position in the history of that institution.

== Career ==
Hébert has been featured on The Oprah Winfrey Show, The Early Show with Harry Smith on CBS, CNN, NBC Nightly News with Brian Williams, The Huffington Post, Good Morning America, and The Today Show. He hosts a weekly radio show on the Cumulus Broadcasting Network titled Doctor for the People which has an interactive platform for Hébert to connect with urban communities. He has contributed to the Discovery Channel television show How Stuff Works and to the Dr. Oz show.

Hebert is the founder and CEO of College Health TV, the first and only evidence-based, peer-reviewed health information network for college students. College Health TV is streaming on over 300 college and university campuses across the US.

Hebert is owner of Research Works Inc. and has been the Principal Investigator on over 100 FDA regulated clinical trials on various nutritional and pharmacotherapeutic agents. His recent research on monoclonal antibodies entitled "Bamlanivimab plus Etesevimab in Mild or Moderate Covid-19" was published in the New England Journal of Medicine.

Hébert helped create and is featured on Netflix in a full-length documentary about ADHD entitled Take Your Pills. and is prominently featured in the Spike Lee HBO documentary, When The Levees Broke: A Requiem in Four Parts.

He testified before the United States Congress on April 28, 2010, on the safety of Federal Emergency Management Agency trailers.

Dr. Hebert was asked by Louisiana Governor John Bel Edwards to serve as an executive committee appointee for the Louisiana Health Equity Task Force. This task force is attributed to stemming the tide of COVID-19 infections in the state of Louisiana at a time in which the minority fatality rate was over 70%.

Hebert published his first book entitled Sick·le: Awakening the Truth about Sickle Cell Disease which is a guide that chronicles patient experiences with sickle cell disease.
