= Eternal You =

- Film poster
- Directed by: Hans Block; Moritz Riesewieck
- Produced by: Christian Beetz; Georg Tschurtschenthaler; Lena Raith; Zora Nessl
- Cinematography: Tom Bergmann; Konrad Waldmann
- Edited by: Anne Jünemann; Lisa Zoe Geretschläger
- Music by: Gregor Keienburg; Raffael Seyfried
- Production companies: Beetz Brothers; Concordia Studio; Impact Partners; Motto Pictures; Dogwoof; Arte; NDR; SWR; VPRO; ORF; NRK; Docmine
- Distributed by: Farbfilm Verleih; Film Movement
- Release dates: January 20, 2024 (Sundance); June 20, 2024 (Germany)
- Running time: 87 minutes
- Countries: Germany; United States
- Languages: English; Korean

Eternal You is a 2024 German-American documentary film, directed by Hans Block and Moritz Riesewieck. It follows artificial intelligence startups that create digital avatars for loved ones following their deaths.

It had its world premiere at the Sundance Film Festival on January 20, 2024, and was released in Germany on June 20, 2024, by Farbfilm Verleih.

== Premise ==
Artificial intelligence startups create digital avatars for loved ones following their deaths. Exploring the consequences of turning immortality into a product.

== Release ==
The film had its world premiere at the Sundance Film Festival on January 20, 2024. It screened at CPH:DOX on March 21, 2024. It also screened at the Hot Docs Canadian International Documentary Festival on April 29, 2024. In April 2024, Film Movement acquired US distribution rights to the film. It was released in Germany on June 20, 2024, by Farbfilm Verleih.

== Reception ==
On the review aggregator website Rotten Tomatoes, 90% of 29 critics' reviews are positive, with an average rating of 7.6/10. Metacritic, which uses a weighted average, assigned the film a score of 74 out of 100, based on 10 critics, indicating "generally favorable" reviews.

Lucy Mangan of The Guardian called the documentary "beautifully balanced - and highly alarming".
