= Julie Goldman (producer) =

American film producer

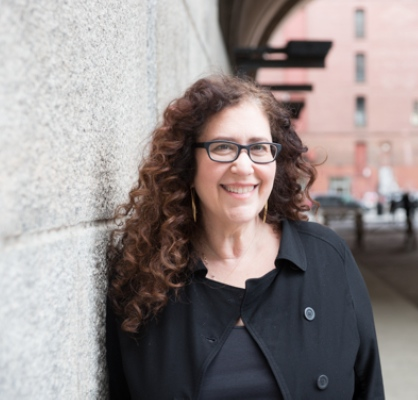
- Born: New York City, New York, U.S.
- Occupations: Producer, executive producer
- Website: www.mottopictures.com

Julie Goldman is an American film producer and executive producer. She founded Motto Pictures in 2009. She is an Oscar-nominated and Emmy Award-winning producer and executive producer of documentary feature films and series.

== Life and work ==
Julie Goldman is an Oscar-nominated and Emmy Award-winning producer and executive producer of documentary feature films and series. Julie is the first documentary producer to receive the Amazon Studios Sundance Institute Producer’s Award and the Cinereach Producer’s Award. She produced Nanfu Wang’s new film, In the Same Breath, which premiered on opening night at the 2021 Sundance Film Festival. She recently produced on The Velvet Underground, directed by Todd Haynes, which premiered at Cannes and was recently released on Apple+ in 2021, and is producing new films with Roger Ross Williams and Maite Alberdi. Julie executive produced Tribeca Grand Jury Prize winner Socks on Fire, and the acclaimed Goya Award and Oscar nominated The Mole Agent, and produced Gotham and IDA Award winner A Thousand Cuts —both 2020 Sundance premieres. She produced Sundance Grand Jury Prize winner and Oscar-shortlisted One Child Nation, which was acquired by Amazon Studios; RINGSIDE, which had its world premiere at the Berlin International Film Festival and recently debuted on Showtime; and Bully. Coward. Victim. The Story of Roy Cohn, which premiered at the New York Film Festival and launched on HBO in June. Julie produced Emmy Award-winning and Oscar-nominated Abacus: Small Enough To Jail, The Final Year, and Showtime’s series Murder in the Bayou. Julie is the producer of Life, Animated which won the Sundance Directing Award, was nominated for the 2017 Best Documentary Oscar, and won three Emmys, including the award for Best Documentary. She is executive producer of Weiner, winner of the Sundance Grand Jury Prize. Julie also produced and executive produced: Emmy Award-winning films Best of Enemies, Solitary, Manhunt; Peabody Award-winning films Inventing Tomorrow, Southwest of Salem; Emmy-nominated films and series Gideon's Army, 1971, Humans of New York; Oscar-shortlisted films, God Loves Uganda, Ai Weiwei: Never Sorry, 3 1/2 Minutes, Ten Bullets, Art and Craft and Buck.

== Filmography ==
- Free Floaters (1997)
- Digital Gremlin for Windows (1999)
- Hellhounds on My Trail: The Afterlife of Robert Johnson (2000)
- X-Philes (2000)
- Eating Well for Optimum Health (2000)
- Fashion Victim: The Killing of Gianni Versace (2001)
- Saving Grace: Children and Spirituality (2001)
- Pregnant Man (2001)
- Devil's Playground (2002)
- Who Is Alan Smithee? (2002)
- Mama Africa (2002)
- The Cult of Cindy (2003)
- Muddy Waters: Can't be Satisfied (2003)
- Hank Williams: Honky Tonk Blues (2004)
- Slasher (2004)
- Three of Hearts: A Postmodern Family (2004)
- Family Bonds (2004)
- What Remains: The Life and Work of Sally Mann (2005)
- Punk: Attitude (2005)
- The American Ruling Class (2005)
- Sketches of Frank Gehry (2005)
- Black Sun (2005)
- Too Tough to Die: A Tribute to Johnny Ramone (2006)
- Loudquietloud (2006)
- Once in a Lifetime: The Extraordinary Story of the New York Cosmos (2006)
- Office Tigers (2006)
- Bad Boys of Summer (2007)
- In the Shadow of the Moon (2007)
- Doubletime (2007)
- Crazy Sexy Cancer (2007)
- Oh, Saigon (2007)
- Alexis Arquette: She's My Brother (2007)
- Cat Dancers (2008)
- Orthodox Stance (2008)
- The Joy of Lex (2008)
- Goth Cruise (2008)
- Sergio (2009)
- Sweethearts of the Prison Rodeo (2009)
- New World Order (2009)
- 21 Below (2009)
- The Nine Lives of Marion Barry (2009)
- Sons of Perdition (2010)
- I'm Dangerous With Love (2010)
- Buck (2011)
- Our School (2011)
- Better This World (2011)
- Koran By Heart (2011)
- A Place at the Table (2012)
- Ai Weiwei: Never Sorry (2012)
- Beware of Mr. Baker (2012)
- One Nation Under Dog (2012)
- God Loves Uganda (2013)
- Manhunt: The Search for Bin Laden (2013)
- Gideon's Army (2013)
- The Kill Team (2013)
- We Are the Giant (2014)
- Mission Blue (2014)
- The Great Invisible (2014)
- Art and Craft (2014)
- 1971 (2014)
- The Yes Men Are Revolting (2014)
- Florence, Arizona (2014)
- Best of Enemies (2015)
- 3 1/2 Minutes, Ten Bullets (2015)
- #Single: Girl Behind the Camera (2015)
- The Music of Strangers: Yo-Yo Ma and the Silk Road Ensemble (2015)
- Indian Point (2015)
- The 100 Years Show (2015)
- Blackface (2015)
- Life, Animated (2016)
- Weiner (2016)
- Generation Food (2016)
- Chicken People (2016)
- Southwest of Salem: The Story of the San Antonio Four (2016)
- Enlighten Us: The Rise and Fall of James Arthur Ray (2016)
- Homegrown: The Counter-Terror Dilemma (2016)
- Solitary (2016)
- Extremis (2016)
- Abacus: Small Enough to Jail (2016)
- When God Sleeps (2017)
- Shadowman (2017)
- Family I Had (2017)
- The Final Year (2017)
- The Cleaners (2018)
- Inventing Tomorrow (2018)
- Take Your Pills (2018)
- The Raft (2018)
- Charm City (2018)
- Love, Gilda (2018)
- One Child Nation (2019)
- Ringside (2019)
- Murder in the Bayou (2019)
- Bully. Coward. Victim. The Story of Roy Cohn (2019)
- Humans of New York: The Series (2019)
- The Mole Agent (2020)
- A Thousand Cuts (2020)
- Socks on Fire (2020)
- In the Same Breath (2021)
- The Velvet Underground (2021)
- The Return of Tanya Tucker: Featuring Brandi Carlile (2022)
- Selena y Los Dinos (2025)

== Externals ==
- Julie Goldman at IMDb
