= Take Your Pills =

- Poster
- Release date: 2018
- Country: United States

Take Your Pills is an 87-minute-long American documentary from 2018, directed by Alison Klayman and produced by Motto Pictures and Netflix Studios. The documentary explores the positives and negatives of taking psychostimulant medications such as Adderall. The film is a series of interviews with college students and working adults who are prescribed stimulants for attention deficit hyperactivity disorder (ADHD), along with parents who touch on the difficulties of raising children with ADHD and interviews with professionals commenting on the use of stimulants.

Those interviewed include former player for the NFL's Jacksonville Jaguars Eben Britton, and neuroscientist Anjan Chatterjee. The film's executive producers were Maria Shriver and Christina Schwarzenegger; its world premiere was at the SXSW film festival in 2018.

== Plot ==
The documentary begins by introducing the interviewees, giving some background and how they are associated with Adderall or stimulant medications. The film interviews people from different backgrounds and phases in life, from college students and children to former NFL players to psychologists. While the health professionals discuss the history of stimulant use and their opinions, other interviewees speak of their personal experience with the medications. There are also some family members that speak of noticeable changes caused by the medications.

=== Cast and synopsis ===
Jasper Holt is a college senior who has been taking Adderall since his ADHD diagnosis at the age of six. He attended a private school that he says recommended medication. His mom was worried that the medication would hinder his creative side, but he is still very much into art. Holt says he was embarrassed for taking the medication when he was in high school, and he is trying to lower his dosage to eventually stop taking it.

Delaney is a college junior who was prescribed Adderall. She describes it as "Rx gold" that "sews up" your life. Her standpoint is that she needs it to hold her life together; she claims that other people had tutors in high school to prepare for the standardized tests, and her parents couldn't afford tutors, so she resorted to Adderall. She says others use it to give themselves a leg up in comparison to other students, whereas she uses it to meet the level those students were already at.

Rahiem is a high school student who was diagnosed with ADHD when he was very young. He was prescribed Adderall and forewarned of the effects if he did take his medication. His mother was mostly interviewed; she said she saw a noticeable improvement in his behavior when he takes his medication.

Eben Britton is a former NFL player who was prescribed Adderall. He speaks of his experience with the medication as a user who abused it. He admits that he didn't believe he had ADHD; it was just an easy way to have open access to the drugs in order to enhance his performance and deal with the pain from his injuries. His wife stated that when he started on the medication, everything seemed great; he had the time and energy to be a husband and an NFL player, but as time went on, he began to overuse the medication. He claims he is addicted to the medication just to be the best in a very competitive environment.

Blue Williams is an artist manager who takes Adderall on occasion. He was diagnosed as a child with ADHD, but his mother did not let him take any medication as she wanted him to adapt to the world. Now as an adult he chooses to use medication on days when he has a lot going on. He states that in modern-day life, there are many distractions that come with technology, and young adults interpret these distractions to believe that they have ADHD, which then leads to their diagnosis and medication.

=== Health professionals ===
Corey Hebert is a physician who practices in New Orleans. He speaks on the topic of stimulants and compares patients like Raheim, who need the drugs, and others who have slightly less severe cases.

Wendy Brown is a political theorist from University of California, Berkeley, who discusses reasons college students and adults may resort to stimulants. She states that the world is a hypercompetitive environment, from students trying to get into the best schools to workers being pushed to work many hours, where many don't know how to cope or how to stay on top with using medication to enhance their performance.

Martha Farah is a cognitive neuroscientist from the University of Pennsylvania. She discussed the history of psychostimulant medication and some of the controversies as well. She mentioned the incorrect belief that medication will make the consumer smarter and claimed this theory was wrong.

Anjan Chatterjee is the chair of neurology at the University of Pennsylvania. He addresses the differences in the use of drugs from his generation to the current generation. He explores the history of stimulant usage. He also discusses the pros and cons of medication usage and the improper use of drugs.

Matthew Piskorz and Lucas Siegel are the co-founders of Alternascript, a company that creates supplements. Their ideology is that if students are trying to get ahead by taking prescription drugs, then there should be legal supplements others can take to level the playing field. One of their scientifically backed products is OptiMind.

== Reception ==
David Ehrlich reviewed the documentary for IndieWire, writing that the film "never finds its focus", describing the director as approaching the topic with the "reactionary zeal of a local TV news segment" in a comprehensive but "myopic" look at the use of prescription amphetamines. Ehrlich says Klayman uses "scare-mongering tactics", and he criticizes the filming technique as a "tired attempt to conflate ADHD with a video game aesthetic and a pixelated cartoon of a skeleton drowning in little blue pills".

Devon Frye writes in ADDitude magazine that the documentary is a "heavy-handed" and "biased portrait of stimulant use in America", in which Klayman demonstrates "little interest in showing both sides of the story" while focusing on medication users who "openly admit to taking the drugs to get ahead in a culture that constantly demands more". Frye states that the film explores questions that are worthy, but fails to deliver answers to those questions by focusing on unsympathetic characters and by relying on "jarring animations and repetitive interviews".

Reviewing the documentary for Variety magazine, Owen Gleiberman calls the film "urgent" and "eye-opening". Gleiberman writes that the connections made by the movie's thesis "may strike some as too speculative for comfort", but they can "fire up your perceptions enough to burn through the cumulative effects of advertising". Justin Lowe, film critic for The Hollywood Reporter, writes that some of the interviewees have interesting stories, but the "talking-head experts" and the animated and archived film sequences are sluggish. He states that the film relies heavily on anecdote but is light on data and documentation and fails to make its case.
