= Life, Animated =

2016 American documentary film by Roger Ross Williams

- Theatrical release poster
- Directed by: Roger Ross Williams
- Written by: Ron Suskind
- Based on: Life, Animated: A Story of Sidekicks, Heroes, and Autism by Ron Suskind
- Produced by: Julie Goldman; Roger Ross Williams; Carolyn Hepburn; Christopher Clements
- Starring: Jonathan Freeman; Gilbert Gottfried; Alan Rosenblatt; Owen Suskind; Ron Suskind
- Cinematography: Tom Bergmann
- Edited by: David Teague
- Music by: Dylan Stark; T. Griffin
- Production companies: Motto Pictures; A&E IndieFilms; Roger Ross Williams Productions
- Distributed by: The Orchard
- Release date: July 1, 2016
- Running time: 92 minutes
- Country: United States
- Language: English

Life, Animated is a 2016 American independent documentary film by director Roger Ross Williams. It is co-produced by Williams with Julie Goldman, Carolyn Hepburn and Christopher Clements. Life, Animated is based on journalist Ron Suskind's 2014 book Life, Animated: A Story of Sidekicks, Heroes, and Autism, which tells the story of his son, Owen Suskind, who struggles with autism and learned how to communicate with the outside world through his love of Disney animated films.

Upon its release, the film received generally positive reviews from critics and won numerous awards including the Sundance Film Festival award for Best Direction and the Special Achievement Annie Award. It was also nominated for the Academy Award for Best Documentary Feature Film category at the 89th Academy Awards, but lost to O.J.: Made in America.

== Synopsis ==
Owen Suskind was diagnosed with autism at the age of 3. As Owen withdrew into his silent state, his parents almost lost hope that he would find some way to meaningfully interact with his world. That way was found through animated films, especially ones by Walt Disney Animation Studios, which provided Owen a way to understand the world through its stories to the point of creating his own. This film covers the life of Owen and how he communicates with the help of Disney and his family. However, Owen soon learns as well that there is more to real life, such as relationships and breakups, than what Disney can illustrate in animation even as his family prepares itself for an uncertain future with him.

== Cast ==
- Jonathan Freeman as the voice of Jafar
- Gilbert Gottfried as the voice of Iago
- Alan Rosenblatt
- Owen Suskind as himself
- Ron Suskind as himself

== Production ==
The animation is done by Mac Guff (not to be confused with Illumination Mac Guff, now known as Illumination Studios Paris, an animation studio founded by Mac Guff but later purchased by Illumination Entertainment). To secure the rights for the clips and characters used in the film, Williams showed the unfinished product to the heads of department put together by Disney Productions president Sean Bailey. Williams referred to it as "the day I made the lawyers cry" after the end of the presentation. The films selected for the film were "100% Suskind".

== Reception ==
The review aggregation website Rotten Tomatoes reported a 94% approval rating based on 116 reviews, with an average rating of 7.71/10. The website's critical consensus reads, "Life, Animated offers a heartwarming look at one family's journey, and a fascinating message that's more than enough to outweigh its unanswered questions." On Metacritic, the film holds a score of 75 out of 100, based on 25 critics, indicating "generally favorable" reviews.

The Guardian's critic Lanre Bakare praised the film and said, "It's a beguiling mix of animated storytelling and narration that doesn't flinch from exploring the emotional highs and lows that accompany a life with autism." Kenneth Turan of LA Times lauded the film and said, "[Williams] spent two years on this project, and the trust everyone involved placed in him allowed for an emotional honesty that is Life, Animated's greatest strength." Writing for Variety, Justin Chang wrote, "This latest film from Roger Ross Williams (God Loves Uganda) teems with insights into how children's fantasy can and can't bridge a developmental gap, but works on an even more basic, emotional level as a warm testament to a family's love and resilience." The Hollywood Reporter's Duane Byrge called it "a documentary gem." Ann Hornaday of The Washington Post positively reviewed the series and said, "Life, Animated makes fascinating points, about the power of cinema, about meeting our loved ones where they are and, as Ron says, about who gets to decide what constitutes a meaningful life" Rolling Stone's chief film critic Peter Travers said, "In no way does Owen's story claim to be a cure-all. Instead of false hope, it offers up possibility, the chance of a stimulus that might get past the blocks of developmental disorder. That's more than encouraging. Life, Animated is truly inspirational."

Writing for The A.V. Club, Noel Murray said, "On the list of Disney-related 2016 releases about child-rearing and handicaps, this one goes just above Finding Dory. What it lacks in wacky hijinks, it makes up in hard truths." Reviewing for RogerEbert.com, film critic Sheila O'Malley wrote, "Powerful and emotional, without being manipulative. It is deeply inspiring, without trying to be. It is honest about Owen's struggles, and the struggles of his family." Entertainment Weekly's Joe McGovern also lauded the series, saying, "The Suskinds' humongous hearts are obviously in the right place and their openness is to be admired and encouraged - even if a book, more than a movie, remains the better venue to fairly and honestly tell Owen's extraordinary story."

Some publications however were more critical towards the film. In a lukewarm review of Empire David Parkinson wrote, "A touch twee at times, but the use of classic and original animation is admirable, while Owen emerges as the king of sidekicks." Film critic Anthony Lane of The New Yorker said, "Owen has made immense progress, to which Life, Animated is a stirring tribute, yet it leaves a trail of questions unanswered or unasked." The New York Times's Jeannette Catsoulis quipped, "Belaboring the cartoon connection, the director leaves the family struggles that enrich Mr. Suskind's 2014 book of the same title stubbornly veiled." In a less enthusiastic review for Slant Magazine Clayton Dillard stated, "It never addresses Disney's wholly manufactured stranglehold on turning adolescent desire into a consumerist impulse."

== Land of the Lost Sidekicks ==
An exclusive short, based on Owen's fan fiction featuring a younger version of himself and his favorite Disney sidekicks battling against the evil Fuzzbutch, was released on The Wrap in 2016.

Sidekicks used in the film:

- Baloo from The Jungle Book (1967)
- Timon and Rafiki from The Lion King (1994)
- Iago and Abu from Aladdin (1992)
- Lucky Jack from Home on the Range (2004)
- Sebastian from The Little Mermaid (1989)

== Accolades ==
Award	Category	Recipients	Results	Ref.
Academy Awards	Best Documentary Feature	Roger Ross Williams; Julie Goldman	Nominated	
Amsterdam International Documentary Film Festival	IDFA Audience Award	Roger Ross Williams	2nd-Place	
Annie Awards	Special Achievement Award	Life, Animated	Won	
Black Reel Awards	Best Feature Documentary	Life, Animated	Nominated	
Budapest International Documentary Festival	Student Jury Award	Roger Ross Williams	Won	
Chicago Film Critics Association Awards	Best Documentary	Life, Animated	Nominated	
Cinema Eye Honors Awards	The Unforgettable Award	Owen Suskind	Won	
Cinema Eye Honors Awards	Cinema Eye Audience Choice Prize	Roger Ross Williams	Nominated	
Cinema Eye Honors Awards	Outstanding Achievement in Graphic Design or Animation	Brian Bowman; Philippe Sonrier	Nominated	
Critics' Choice Documentary Awards	Most Compelling Living Subject of a Documentary	Life, Animated	Won	
Critics' Choice Documentary Awards	Best Director (Theatrical Feature)	Roger Ross Williams	Nominated	
Critics' Choice Documentary Awards	Best Documentary Feature	Roger Ross Williams	Nominated	
Critics' Choice Documentary Awards	Most Innovative Documentary	Roger Ross Williams	Nominated	
DeadCENTER Film Festival	Best Documentary	Roger Ross Williams	Won	
Detroit Film Critics Society Awards	Best Documentary	Life, Animated	Nominated	
Directors Guild of America Awards	Outstanding Directing – Documentaries	Life, Animated	Nominated	
Docville	Best International Documentary	Life, Animated	Won	
Dublin Film Critics' Circle Awards	Best Documentary	Life, Animated	3rd-Place	
Florida Film Critics Circle Awards	Best Documentary Film	Life, Animated	Nominated	
Full Frame Documentary Film Festival	Best Documentary Feature	Roger Ross Williams	Won	
Heartland Film Festival	Truly Moving Picture Award	Roger Ross Williams; A&E IndieFilms; Motto Pictures; Roger Ross Williams Productions; The Orchard	Won	
Hot Docs Canadian International Documentary Festival	Top 20 Audience Favorites	Roger Ross Williams	Nominated	
London Critics Circle Film Awards	Best Documentary of the Year	Life, Animated	Nominated	
Melbourne International Film Festival	Most Popular Documentary	Roger Ross Williams	8th-Place	
Nantucket Film Festival	Best Documentary Feature	Roger Ross Williams	Won	
National Board of Review	Top Five Best Documentaries	Life, Animated	Won	
North Carolina Film Critics Association	Best Documentary Feature	Life, Animated	Nominated	
Producers Guild of America Awards	Outstanding Producer of Documentary Theatrical Motion Pictures	Julie Goldman; Roger Ross Williams	Nominated	
Satellite Awards	Best Documentary Film	Life, Animated	Nominated	
San Francisco International Film Festival	Best Documentary Film	Life, Animated	Won	
Seattle International Film Festival	Golden Space Needle Award - Best Documentary	Roger Ross Williams	Nominated	
Stockholm Film Festival	Bronze Horse - Best Documentary	Roger Ross Williams	Nominated	
Sundance Film Festival	Best Direction - Documentary	Roger Ross Williams	Won	
Sundance Film Festival	Grand Jury Prize - Best Documentary	Roger Ross Williams	Nominated	
