= White Coat Rebels =

- Directed by: Greg Barker
- Produced by: Greg Barker; Diane Becker; Christopher Buchanan; Harriet Frasier
- Cinematography: Tom Bergmann
- Edited by: Todd Downing
- Music by: Pierre Charles
- Production company: Participant
- Release date: June 24, 2021 (AFI)
- Running time: 82 minutes
- Country: United States
- Language: English

White Coat Rebels is a 2021 American documentary film directed and produced by Greg Barker. It follows corruption of Big Pharma, and its influence on doctors.

The film had its world premiere at AFI Docs on June 24, 2021.
