= The Mole Agent =

2020 documentary film by Maite Alberdi

- Film poster
- Spanish: El agente topo
- Directed by: Maite Alberdi
- Written by: Maite Alberdi
- Produced by: Marcela Santibañez
- Cinematography: Pablo Valdés
- Edited by: Carolina Siraqyan
- Music by: Vincent van Warmerdam
- Production companies: Tribeca Film Institute; Sundance Institute; ITVS; Micromundo Productions; Motto Pictures; Sutor Kolonko; Voyla Films; Malvalanda; SWR
- Distributed by: Gravitas Ventures (United States); Cinema Delicatessen (Netherlands)
- Release dates: 25 January 2020 (Sundance); 1 September 2020 (United States); 10 December 2020 (Netherlands)
- Running time: 84 minutes
- Countries: Chile; United States; Germany; Netherlands; Spain
- Language: Spanish
- Box office: $402,414

The Mole Agent (Spanish: El agente topo) is a 2020 internationally co-produced documentary film by Chilean filmmaker Maite Alberdi. It was screened at the 2020 Sundance Film Festival in the World Cinema Documentary Competition. At the 93rd Academy Awards, It was nominated for the Academy Award for Best Documentary Feature and was selected as the Chilean entry for Best International Feature Film, making the shortlist of fifteen films.

== Synopsis ==
A private investigator (Rómulo Aitken) has a client who alleges that her mother, Sonia, is being mistreated by staff in a nursing home in El Monte, Chile. Rómulo hires an elderly man (Sergio Chamy), and the documentary follows Sergio as he poses as a new resident of the nursing home to investigate these claims.

During his stay, Sergio interacts with several residents, including Berta, Marta, and Rubeira. Berta, who has lived in the nursing home for twenty-five years and has never been married, becomes infatuated with Sergio and even expresses to the home's director her desire to marry him. Marta, who has dementia, frequently asks strangers passing by to take her to her mother's house. Sergio discovers that Marta steals other residents' belongings, including Sonia's. At one point, Marta escapes but is eventually brought back by the police. Rubeira also has memory loss and longs to see her children and grandchildren. Sergio requests photographs of them from Rómulo and shows them to Rubeira.

After conducting his investigation, Sergio concludes that Sonia is being treated well. He informs Rómulo that no crimes are being committed and returns home to his family in Santiago. But more importantly he notes that it's not the staff who are irresponsible and nonempathetic towards the clients of the home. It's in fact the clients' own families who don't come visit or do not seem to care. Sergio even says that the daughter of Sonia should be the one investigating her own mother's situation, not him. If the daughter paid more attention to her mother, she'd already know that her mother is in good hands. Sonia and many others feel lonely and forgotten which contributes to their state of mind and health.

== Release ==
The film had its world premiere at the Sundance Film Festival on 25 January 2020. In August 2020, Gravitas Ventures acquired US distribution rights to the film, and set it for a 1 September 2020 release. The film was released in the Netherlands on 10 December 2020 by Cinema Delicatessen. It was broadcast on PBS in the United States on 25 January 2021 as part of their POV program.

== Reception ==
=== Critical response ===
On review aggregation website Rotten Tomatoes, the film has an approval rating of 94% based on 71 reviews, with an average rating of 7.6/10. The critical consensus reads "Warm and funny, The Mole Agent offers audiences a poignant reminder that it's never too late to forge new connections and embark on new adventures." On Metacritic the film has a weighted average score of 69 out of 100, based on 13 critics, indicating "generally favorable reviews".

Glenn Kenny of The New York Times gave the film a positive review commenting: "The film’s people are moving, and the payoff is compassionate, humane and worth heeding." Nick Allen of RogerEbert.com rated the movie three stars out of four writing: "The documentary succeeds with its tenderness, while vividly reminding us how easily society can forget its elders."

=== Awards and nominations ===
The Mole Agent has received several awards and nominations. The documentary was the Chilean entry for the Goya Award for Best Iberoamerican Film, becoming the eighteenth Chilean nomination in that category since its creation and the second for Alberdi after La once was nominated in 2015. At the 93rd Academy Awards, the film was nominated for Best Documentary Feature (losing to My Octopus Teacher), and also made the shortlist for Best International Feature Film.

Award	Date of ceremony	Category	Recipient(s)	Result	Ref.
Academy Awards	25 April 2021	Best Documentary Feature	The Mole Agent	Nominated	
Goya Awards	6 March 2021	Best Iberoamerican Film	The Mole Agent	Nominated	
Independent Spirit Awards	22 April 2021	Best Documentary Feature	The Mole Agent	Nominated	
Washington D.C. Area Film Critics Association Awards	8 February 2021	Best International/Foreign Language Film	The Mole Agent	Nominated	
National Board of Review	26 January 2021	Top 5 Foreign Language Films	The Mole Agent	Won	
Cinema Eye Honors	9 March 2021	Audience Choice Prize	Maite Alberdi	Nominated	
Cinema Eye Honors	9 March 2021	Outstanding Achievement in Original Music Score	Vincent van Warmerdam	Nominated	
Cinema Eye Honors	9 March 2021	The Unforgettables	Sergio Chamy	Won	
Biografilm Festival	13 June 2021	Bring The Change Award	The Mole Agent	Won	

== Television adaptation ==
In March 2023, it was announced that Netflix had ordered a television series adaptation of the film with Michael Schur executive producing and starring Ted Danson.

== See also ==
- List of submissions to the 93rd Academy Awards for Best International Feature Film
- List of Chilean submissions for the Academy Award for Best International Feature Film
