= Greg Barker =

American filmmaker and producer

Greg Barker is an American filmmaker and producer. In 2011, The New York Times described Barker as “a filmmaker of artistic and political consequence.”

Previous films include Sergio (short-listed in 2010 for the Academy Award for Best Documentary Feature, winner of the Best Editing Award at the 2009 Sundance Film Festival); Ghosts of Rwanda (winner of the 2004 DuPont Columbia award and The Robert F. Kennedy Award for International Reporting); Manhunt: The Search for Bin Laden (Grand Jury Prize Sundance Film Festival 2013, Winner of Primetime Emmy for Outstanding Documentary or Nonfiction Special and Outstanding Cinematography for Nonfiction Programming); and The Final Year (Toronto International Film Festival 2017).

== Life and career ==
A native Californian, Barker earned a BA in economics from George Washington University and a MSc in International Relations from The London School of Economics.

He lived in London for most of his adult life, and became a freelance journalist and war correspondent, working with organizations such as CNN, BBC and Reuters. He turned to filmmaking in 1998, and made a string of international films for the flagship PBS television series Frontline. Barker spent seven years researching the Rwandan genocide, which resulted in the 2004 feature-length Frontline documentary Ghosts of Rwanda, which won numerous awards and established his reputation.

In 1998, Barker began working closely with the feature documentary producers John Battsek of Passion Pictures and Julie Goldman of Motto Pictures. Together they have made Sergio, Koran By Heart, Manhunt, Homegrown: The Counter-Terror Dilemma, and The Final Year all of which Barker directed for HBO Documentary Films.

He directed his first narrative feature Sergio (2020) for Netflix. It premieres at Sundance Film Festival 2020.

Barker now lives in California and is married to the soprano Harriet Fraser.

== Filmography (as director) ==
- The Survival of Saddam (2000)
- The Commanding Heights (2001)
- Campaign Against Terror (2002)
- Ghosts of Rwanda (2004)
- The Age of AIDS (2006)
- Showdown with Iran (2007)
- Sergio (2009)
- Koran By Heart (2011)
- Manhunt (2013)
- We Are the Giant (2014)
- Homegrown: The Counter-Terror Dilemma (2016)
- The Final Year (2017)
- Legion of Brothers (2017)
- Sergio (2020)
- The Longest War (2020)
- White Coat Rebels (2021)
- Ghosts of Beirut (2023)
