= John Battsek =

British film producer

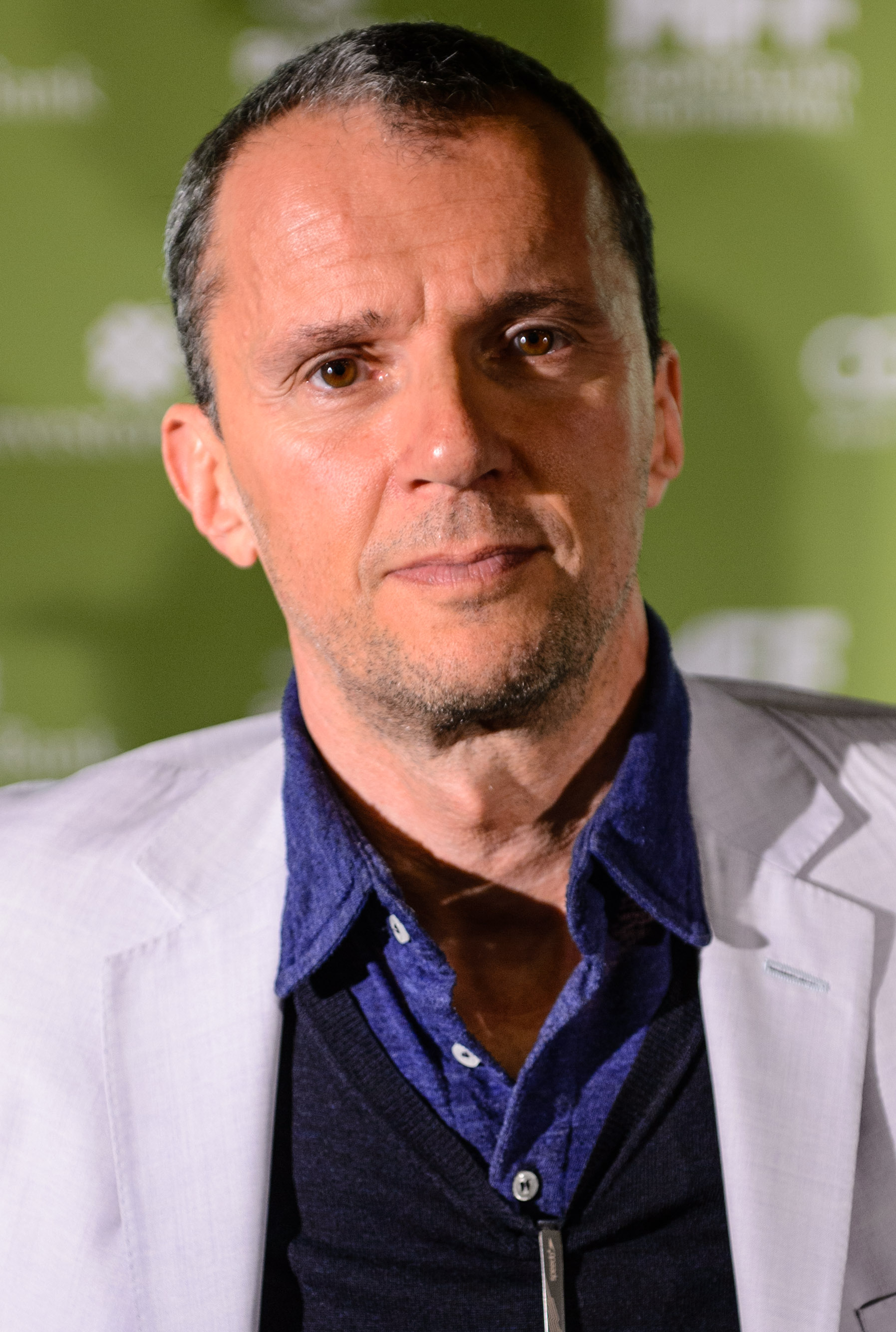
- Battsek at the Montclair Film Festival, May 2015
- Born: September 1963 (age 62)
- Occupation: Film producer

John Saul Adrian Battsek (born September 1963) is a British film producer of documentary films. In 2020, Battsek co-founded production company Ventureland with producers Kerstin Emhoff, Ali Brown, and director Paul Hunter.

He has produced a number of feature documentaries, including One Day in September and Searching for Sugar Man, both winners of the Academy Award for Best Documentary Feature Film. He also produced the Peabody Award-winning documentary film Bobi Wine: The People's President.

== Career and awards ==
Battsek is the son of Micha Battsek, a godson of Albert Einstein. He attended Highgate School until 1977. In 1999, he conceived and produced Academy Award winning One Day in September.

He served as an executive producer on Academy Award-winning Searching for Sugar Man, Academy Award nominated Restrepo and Winter On Fire, and BAFTA award-winning documentaries Hillsborough and The Imposter.

In 2013, Battsek produced Greg Barker's Emmy Award-winning documentary Manhunt: The Search For Bin Laden. In 2016, Battsek produced Peabody Award-winning and BAFTA-nominated Listen to Me Marlon. In 2017, Battsek produced Eric Clapton: Life In 12 Bars, which was nominated for a Grammy Award for Best Music Film. In 2018, Battsek produced Emmy Award-winning documentary Forever Pure.

Battsek was nominated for a PGA Award in 2010 and in 2011 for Sergio and The Tillman Story, respectively. He was also nominated in 2015 for The Green Prince. In 2013, he received the Grierson Trust Trustees' Award.

In 2019, he produced the AACTA Award-winning Australian feature-length documentary, The Australian Dream.

Under the Ventureland banner as Managing Director/Producer, John received an Academy Award nomination for the documentary Bobi Wine: The People’s President. The film later received a Peabody Award at the 84th ceremony in June 2024 and Cinema for Peace Dove for the Political Film of The Year. He also produced Emmy Award winners The Rescue and BECKHAM, BAFTA nominee Wham!, Sports Emmy winner The Deepest Breath, and Critics Choice nominee If These Walls Could Sing. He also served as a producer on the two-time Emmy-winning Rising Phoenix, and biopics Boom! Boom! The World vs. Boris Becker, Sir Alex Ferguson: Never Give In and Lady Boss: The Jackie Collins Story.

== Filmography ==
- One Day in September (1999) – producer
- The Game of Their Lives (2002) – executive producer
- Live Forever: The Rise and Fall of Brit Pop (2003) – producer
- Peace One Day (2004) – co-producer
- Lila Says (Lila Dit Ca) (2004) – co-producer
- A State of Mind (2004) – producer
- Black Sun (2005) – producer
- Once in a Lifetime: The Extraordinary Story of the New York Cosmos (2006) – producer
- Crossing the Line (2006) – executive producer
- In the Shadow of the Moon (2007) – executive producer
- My Kid Could Paint That (2007) – executive producer
- In Prison My Whole Life (2007) – co-producer
- Sergio (2009) – producer
- The Age of Stupid (2009) – executive producer
- Restrepo (2010) – executive producer
- The Stones in Exile – (2010) – producer
- The Tillman Story – (2010) – producer
- Fire in Babylon – (2010) – producer
- Project Nim – (2011) – executive producer
- Bob & the Monster – (2011) – executive producer
- Better This World – (2011) – executive producer
- Koran by Heart – (2011) – producer
- The Imposter – (2012) – executive producer
- Searching for Sugar Man – (2012) – executive producer
- How I Live Now – (2013) – producer
- Hillsborough – (2014) – executive producer
- Listen to Me Marlon – (2015) – producer
- We Are X – (2016) – producer
- Keep Quiet – (2016) – executive producer
- The Fall – (2016) – executive producer
- George Best – All by Himself – (2016) – producer
- Forever Pure – (2016) – executive producer
- Five Came Back – 2017 – producer
- Legion of Brothers – 2017 – producer
- The Final Year – 2017 – producer
- Eric Clapton: Life in 12 Bars – 2017 – producer
- Westwood: Punk, Icon, Activist – 2018 – producer
- Studio 54 – 2018 – producer
- If I Leave Here Tomorrow: A Film About Lynyrd Skynyrd – 2018 – producer
- The Serengeti Rules – 2018 – executive producer
- Mike Wallace Is Here – 2019 – producer
- The Australian Dream – 2019 – producer
- Andy Murray: Resurfacing – 2019 – producer
- Citizen K – 2019 – producer
- Circus of Books – 2019 – executive producer
- Sid and Judy – 2019 – producer
- Mystify: Michael Hutchence – 2019 – producer
- Oliver Sacks: His Own Life – 2019 – executive producer
- Rising Phoenix – 2020 – producer
- Final Account – 2020 – producer
- 'Til Kingdom Come – 2020 – producer
- Belushi – 2020 – producer
- The Trials of Oscar Pistorius – 2020 – producer
- The Rescue – 2021 – producer
- The Real Charlie Chaplin – 2021 – producer
- Detainee 001 – 2021 – executive producer
- Sir Alex Ferguson: Never Give In – 2021 – producer
- Football's Darkest Secret – 2021 – executive producer
- Lady Boss: The Jackie Collins Story – 2021 – producer
- FIFA Uncovered – 2022 – producer
- The Sound of 007 – 2022 – producer
- If These Walls Could Sing – 2022 – producer
- Wham! – 2023 – producer
- The Deepest Breath – 2023 – producer
- Beckham – 2023 – producer
- Boom! Boom! The World vs. Boris Becker – 2023 – producer
- Bobi Wine: The People's President – 2023 – producer
- 99 – 2024 – producer
- Elton John: Never Too Late – 2024 – executive producer
- Never Get Busted! – 2025 – executive producer
- Kerouac's Road: The Beat of a Nation – 2025 – producer
- Birthright – 2025 – executive producer
- Just Sing – 2025 – producer
- A Simple Soldier – 2025 – producer
- Murder in Monaco – 2025 – producer
- The Last First: Winter K2 – 2026 – producer
