= Sergio (2009 film) =

- Film poster
- Directed by: Greg Barker
- Produced by: Greg Barker; John Battsek; Julie Goldman
- Starring: William von Zehle; Andre Valentine; Samantha Power
- Edited by: Karen Schmeer
- Release date: January 17, 2009 (Sundance)
- Running time: 94 minutes
- Country: United States
- Language: English

Sergio is a 2009 documentary film based on Samantha Power's biography, Sergio: One Man's Fight to Save the World. The film revolves around the story of a Brazilian United Nations diplomat, Sérgio Vieira de Mello who worked for the UN for more than 34 years and was ultimately killed in the Canal Hotel bombing in Iraq on August 19, 2003. The work includes extensive interviews with William von Zehle, a U.S. Army First Sergeant in 2003, who spent hours trying to rescue de Mello from under a 9m stack of concrete and other debris of the collapsed building.

Sergio premiered at the 2009 Sundance Film Festival, where Karen Schmeer won the Documentary Editing Award.

== Festival screenings ==
- Sundance Film Festival – World Premiere- Park City, UT 2009 Award winner – Best Editing, Documentary Karen Schmeer
- True/False Film Festival Columbia, MO 2009
- Hot Docs Canadian International Documentary Festival Toronto, Canada 2009
- Mountainfilm in Telluride Telluride, CO 2009 Audience Award Winner
- Expression En Corto San Miguel de Allende, Mexico 2009
- Melbourne International Film Festival Melbourne, Australia 2009
- Sarajevo Film Festival Sarajevo, Bosnia and Herzegovina 2009
- Zurich Film Festival Zurich, Switzerland 2009
- Aspen FILMFEST Aspen, CO 2009 Audience Award Winner, Best Documentary
- Internazionale a Ferrarra Italy 2009
- BFI 53rd London Film Festival London, UK 2009
- Heartland Film Festival Indianapolis, IN 2009 Crystal Heart Award Winner
- Bergen International Film Festival Bergen, Norway 2009
- Sheffield Doc/Fest, Sheffield, UK 2009
- Global Visions Film Festival Edmonton, Canada 2009
- IDFA- Amsterdam 2009
- Stockholm International Film Festival- Stockholm, Sweden
- Dominican Republic International Film Festival
- Santo Domingo, Dominican Republic 2009
- Palm Springs International Film Festival Palm Springs, CA 2010
- Sedona International Film Festival Sedona, AZ 2010 WINNER Director's Choice Award
- DOCNZ Auckland/Wellington NZ 2010
- Kosmorama Trondheim International Film Festival Trondheim, Norway 2010
- Beldocs, International Feature Documentary Film Festival Beograd, Serbia
- Norwegian Documentary Volda, Norway 2010
