= One Child Nation =

2019 American documentary film

- Theatrical release poster
- Directed by: Nanfu Wang; Jialing Zhang
- Produced by: Nanfu Wang; Jialing Zhang; Christoph Jorg; Julie Goldman; Christopher Clements; Carolyn Hepburn
- Cinematography: Nanfu Wang; Yuanchen Liu
- Edited by: Nanfu Wang
- Music by: Nathan Halpern; Chris Ruggiero
- Production companies: Next Generation; ITVS; WDR/Arte; Motto Pictures; Pumpernickel Films
- Distributed by: Amazon Studios
- Release dates: January 26, 2019 (Sundance); August 9, 2019 (United States)
- Running time: 89 minutes
- Country: United States
- Languages: English; Gan Chinese; Mandarin Chinese
- Box office: $271,841

One Child Nation is a 2019 American documentary film directed by Nanfu Wang and Jialing Zhang about the fallout of China's one-child policy that lasted from 1979 to 2015. The documentary is made up of various interviews with former village chiefs, state officials, ex-human traffickers, artists, midwives, journalists, researchers, and victims of the one-child policy. Nanfu Wang stated, in a roundtable discussion, that when creating the film she wanted to do a "360 degree with the policy—people who carried out the policy and people who were the victims of the policy". During the film, Nanfu Wang discovers more about the ties her own family have with the one-child policy, as they unsuccessfully attempt to locate her cousin who was abandoned by her father's sister in 1989. By the end of the film, Nanfu Wang admits that despite the horrors of the one-child policy, there is an overwhelming acceptance of the policy that remains in China, and a shared attitude that there was no other choice. The closing scenes of the film show the growing propaganda for two child families, presenting the repetition of state interference with family planning within China.

One Child Nation premiered at the Sundance Film Festival on January 26, 2019, where it was awarded the U.S. Grand Jury Prize: Documentary Award, and was theatrically released in the United States on August 9, 2019, by Amazon Studios.

== Historical context ==
This documentary focuses on the impact of the one-child policy which dominated family planning in Post-Mao China from 1979 to 2015. The state prioritised the scientific motivations behind the one-child policy, hoping to brake the increasing population. By 1980, officials claimed that the one-child policy had averted over 300 million births. In the first stages of the policy, women were encouraged to delay getting pregnant, and state slogans were devised to encourage this, such as 'later, longer, fewer'. The policy was far more readily accepted in urban areas in contrast to rural areas. Rural areas resented the policy vehemently, resulting in village cadres being attacked frequently for attempting to implement the policy. Village officials would administer fines, destroy property, confiscate possessions, and abduct women for forced abortion and sterilizations. Therefore, as fear rose so did female infanticide and the gender ratio became imbalanced. Though, it was not just female babies who were killed, to have a male child was commonly far more sought after within Chinese culture. Due to this, there became a disproportionately large number of men in comparison to women as time went on – this, in turn, resulted in a further rise in 'bare sticks'. Many have condemned the state's lack of concern over the social repercussions of the one-child policy. One Child Nation focuses acutely on the impact of the one-child policy on an individual level.

== Documentary topics ==
=== One-child policy ===
The One-Child Policy is the main theme of One Child Nation as Nanfu Wang explores its impact. Within the conducted interview with Zaodi Wang (Nanfu Wang's mother), she reveals the struggles that she faced as a result of going against the one-child policy, and birthing two children: Nanfu Wang and Zhihao Wang. The audience is informed that Zaodi Wang's father, Zhimei Wang, opposed the movement to sterilise Zaodi Wang after Nanfu Wang's birth. They avoided this forced sterilisation by agreeing to wait five years before having another child. Not fully discussed within this documentary was the inclusion of this condition which allowed women to become pregnant again with a second child and would often cost the family a fine of approximately 4,000 yuan (US$500), and was more common in rural areas. Zaodi reveals that if she had birthed another girl, she would have felt that she had no choice but to abandon her. Nanfu Wang also admits that she felt embarrassed growing up because she had a sibling, and was not an only child like the rest of her peers at school. The documentary goes on to discuss the prominent role of state propaganda, such as opera, in spreading the one-child policy. In many areas slogans, such as "Better blood flowing like streams than children born outside the state plan" were painted onto village walls, in order to fear-monger and spread the one-child policy further.

=== Child infanticide ===
The term 'child infanticide', usually and somewhat misleadingly referred to as 'Female infanticide', describes the act of killing a newborn. When used in association with China, this term also branches out to the act of abandoning a newborn for dead. Specific examples are explored within Nanfu Wang's own family as her mother's brother abandoned his child in the market, in the hope of somebody rescuing her, however nobody did and she died after having spent three days on the streets. In addition, Nanfu interviews artist Peng Wang whose artwork, focusing on the idea of 'trash', presents the horrors of the one-child policy as he incorporates graphic images of dead, abandoned babies in medical waste bags in the middle of rubbish heaps. In 2014, Peng Wang was evicted from his home in Songzhuang, by the Beijing state security police as a result of his outspoken opinions and controversial art. His studio was also destroyed by state officials in 2021 as a result of his warnings to the world about China's handling of the COVID-19 pandemic. The documentary's interrogation of child infanticide aims to demonstrate the extent of state control within China. In the New Yorker's Roundtable Discussion series, Nanfu Wang states, "Ironically the people that we want to see the film most are the people who can't see. It's Chinese people". Thus highlighting the continuing problem of state control within China.

=== Forced abortion and sterilization ===
The act of both forced abortion and sterilization was present throughout the existence of the one-child policy in China. It should be clarified that the Chinese national government never officially legitimised coerced abortion. However, throughout One Child Nation, those who implemented these policies disagree. Nanfu Wang's interview with Tunde Wang describes the duties of the rural village officials in implementing the one-child policy. Tunde Wang talks of how women who refused to be sterilised would be collectively forced to by a group of village officials; he admits "I couldn't bear to watch. Honestly, I couldn't take part in that". In addition, Nanfu Wang speaks with Huaru Yuan, a rural midwife, to establish the role of village doctors and midwives in assisting the state policy. Huaru Yuan states "I've done a total of between 50,000 and 60,000 sterilizations and abortions. Many I have induced alive and killed. But I had no choice, it was the government's policy". This section unveils the way that village doctors and midwives would travel around the county performing sterilizations and abortions. Some of these procedures would be carried out on unwilling, abducted women who had been brought to the medical station by government officials. The extent of trauma was somewhat dictated by the government official; some women describe being dragged from their beds in the middle of the night and being taken to be sterilised. The state guaranteed that overzealous government officials would be retrained and disciplined, however this rarely happened.

=== Human trafficking ===
The documentary explores the role of human trafficking within China during the domination of the one-child policy. In this instance, the role of human trafficking mostly outlines the act of collecting already abandoned babies. Nanfu Wang interviews ex-human trafficker Yueneng Duan to investigate his methods. Yueneng Duan, and his family, worked in the Guangdong and Hunan provinces in the 1990s, finding children to sell to orphanages. Yueneng Duan reveals, "I used to walk on this road day and night to see if there were any abandoned babies. If so, I would bring them to the orphanages. The orphanages would pay me $200 for each baby I brought in. They then put them up for international adoption." Yueneng Duan was prosecuted and sentenced to 6 years in prison. Within this section, the documentary introduces Brian and Longlan Stuy and their mission to reunite Chinese families with their lost children who were adopted internationally by US citizens. Brian Stuy also publishes his research, Open Secret: Cash and Coercion in China's International Adoption Program. He reveals that children were being supplied for adoption through three main ways: 'baby buying' schemes within Chinese orphanages, 'education' programs which facilitated the falsification of date of birth records, and 'confiscation' of children led by population control officials.

== List of appearances ==
- Nanfu Wang – Narrator
- Shihua Wang – Nanfu Wang's maternal uncle
- Zaodi Wang – Nanfu Wang's Mother
- Guijiao Wang – Nanfu Wang's paternal aunt
- Zhimei Wang – Nanfu Wang's Grandfather
- Peng Wang – Artist
- Zhihao Wang – Nanfu Wang's Brother
- Yueneng Duan – Ex Human Trafficker
- Tunde Wang – Former Village Chief
- Jiaoming Pang – Journalist and Author
- Xianwen Liu – Family Planning Propaganda Official
- Huaru Yuan – Midwife
- Shuquin Jiang – Family Planning Official
- Brian Stuy – Owner and Founder of Research-China (Husband of Longlan Stuy)
- Longlan Stuy – Research-China's in-country guide and translator (Wife of Brian Stuy)
- Shuangjie Zeng – Young girl separated from twin due to One-Child Policy

== Production ==
Both directors Wang and Zhang were born under the one-child policy in China during the 1980s, but knew little of its effects as it was second nature among the country's populace. After moving to the United States and getting pregnant with her first child in 2017, Wang returned to China in an effort to "explore the direct effects of the 'population war' on her family... acquaintances from her rural village, midwives, family planning officials, journalists and artists."

== Reception ==
=== Box office ===
The film opened at one theater in New York City and one in Los Angeles and grossed $22,244 in its opening weekend, with Amazon reporting "sold-out shows throughout the weekend."

=== Critical response ===
On the review aggregator website Rotten Tomatoes, 98% of 102 critics' reviews are positive, with an average rating of 8.4/10. The website's consensus reads: "As illuminating as it is accessible, One Child Nation probes a painful chapter in Chinese history with piercing clarity." Metacritic, which uses a weighted average, assigned the film a score of 85 out of 100, based on 25 critics, indicating "universal acclaim".

David Rooney of The Hollywood Reporter called the film "a valuable record and a sober but frightening illustration of the dark side of this government-controlled experiment" and praised the editing and musical score. Ram Venkat Srikar of Cinema Sentries called the film "an unapologetic description of the unpleasant aftermath of China's One-Child Policy". Inkoo Kang at Slate wrote that the film is "best viewed as an oral history of a desperate experiment in a fast-changing, selectively amnesiac country" but that "its directness and intimacy lend an indelibility that encyclopedic framing could never approximate." An independent reviewer noted that the film primarily explores the policy's impact on a few interconnected families in rural China rather than presenting a comprehensive view of the nation.

ChinaFile published a set of critiques of "the film's many lacunae, distortions (including overgeneralizations), and failures to address the policy in broader perspective, especially its clear and substantial benefits to significant numbers of women".

=== Foreign language adaptions ===
The documentary film was aired in German by TV-channel arte on 22. October 2019 as "Land der Einzelkinder".
