= The Final Year =

- Theatrical release poster
- Directed by: Greg Barker
- Produced by: John Battsek; Diane Becker; Alice Bristow; Christopher Buchanan
- Starring: Barack Obama; John Kerry; Samantha Power; Ben Rhodes; Susan Rice
- Cinematography: Martina Radwan; Erich Roland
- Edited by: Joshua Altman; Langdon Page
- Music by: Philip Sheppard
- Distributed by: HBO; Magnolia Pictures
- Release dates: September 8, 2017 (TIFF); January 19, 2018
- Running time: 89 minutes
- Country: United States
- Language: English
- Box office: $262,286

The Final Year is a 2017 American documentary film directed by Greg Barker. The film is a chronicle of the Barack Obama administration's foreign policy team and the events of Obama's final year in office. While President Obama features at certain points, the documentary crew mainly followed the activities of Secretary of State John Kerry, UN Ambassador Samantha Power, National Security Advisor Susan Rice and Deputy National Security Advisor Ben Rhodes. Although the documentary does not feature Donald Trump, the emphasis among the main players switches as the final year progresses from enacting a foreign policy legacy to taking measures to protect that legacy from being dismantled by the incoming administration.

The film premiered at the 2017 Toronto International Film Festival. It was given a limited release on January 19, 2018.

== Reception ==
On the review aggregator website Rotten Tomatoes, 83% of 105 critics' reviews are positive. The website's consensus reads: "The Final Year uses director Greg Barker's wide-ranging access to take a detailed inside look at the closing months of the Obama administration." Metacritic, which uses a weighted average, assigned the film a score of 67 out of 100, based on 31 critics, indicating "generally favorable" reviews.

Scott Tobias of Variety wrote that "there's a promotional quality to the documentary that flattens out the political drama."

Oktay Ege Kozak of Paste wrote, "The truly terrifying part of The Final Year, at least as it relates to the current administration, is how concisely and effectively Barker captures the day-to-day mania of a White House that actually has its affairs in order."
