= Angus Wall =

American film editor, producer, director, and title designer (b. 1967)

- Born: Angus Alexander Wall; March 15, 1967 (age 59); United States
- Education: Bowdoin College (BA)
- Occupations: Film editor; film producer; film director; title designer

Angus Alexander Wall (born March 15, 1967) is an American film editor, producer, director, and title designer. He and Kirk Baxter shared the Academy Award for Best Film Editing for the David Fincher film The Social Network (2010), and won again the next year for The Girl with the Dragon Tattoo (2011). The duo were previously nominated for The Curious Case of Benjamin Button (2008), also directed by Fincher.

Wall's title design work on the HBO television series Carnivàle and Game of Thrones both received Emmy Awards in 2004 and 2011, respectively, and his work on the series Rome's titles was nominated for the BAFTA Award in 2005.

== Life and career ==
Wall graduated from Woodberry Forest School in Virginia in 1984. He then earned a BA from Bowdoin College in 1988. In 1992, he and Linda Carlson started the firm Rock Paper Scissors, which has become "a respected West Hollywood creative editorial house known for its commercial work for such clients as BMW, HP, and Nike."

Wall's relationship with the director David Fincher extends back to 1988, when Wall entered the entertainment industry. Wall had edited some commercials directed by David Fincher, and he edited the titles for Fincher's film Se7en. He became an "editorial consultant" on Fight Club (1999), which was edited by James Haygood, and he then co-edited Panic Room (2002) with Haygood. While Wall became the sole editor credited on Zodiac (2007), Kirk Baxter worked with him as an "additional editor". Wall proposed to Fincher that Baxter be the co-editor for The Curious Case of Benjamin Button.

Wall and his firm are noted for being early adopters of all-digital filmmaking using digital cameras. The film Zodiac (2007), which was directed by Fincher and edited by Wall, is noted as "the first major motion picture created without using film or tape," although some parts of the film were shot with conventional cameras. One important aspect of using digital cameras is that the director can view a scene immediately after it is recorded; as Fincher commented in an interview, "Dailies almost always end up being disappointing, like the veil is pierced and you look at it for the first time and think, 'Oh my god, this is what I really have to work with.' But when you can see what you have as it's gathered, it can be a much less neurotic process." Digital filmmaking also creates new possibilities for film editing compared to the "cutting" of reels of physical film; among these possibilities are subtle changes in the timing of an actor's performance, and combining of two different takes of a given scene within a single frame. The Curious Case of Benjamin Button has the additional novel element that the facial performances in many of the film's scenes were recorded independently of the body performances, and were combined to create the final film. Brad Pitt's face performances for Button were used in all the scenes, but for many of the scenes a second actor's performance was used for the rest of Button's body.

Wall directed the documentary Being Eddie (2025), which is about the life and career of Eddie Murphy. Wall said, "There is no one else like him."

== Filmography ==
=== Feature films ===
Year	Title	Functioned as			Dir.	Notes
Year	Title	Producer	Editor	Other	Dir.	Notes
1995	Seven	No	No	Yes	David Fincher	Title sequence editor
1999	Fight Club	No	No	Yes	David Fincher	Assistant editor & editorial consultant
2000	Sunset Strip	No	Yes	No	Adam Collis	with Bruce Cannon
2002	Panic Room	No	Yes	No	David Fincher	with James Haygood
2005	Thumbsucker	No	Yes	No	Mike Mills	with Haines Hall
2007	Zodiac	No	Yes	No	David Fincher	
2008	The Curious Case of Benjamin Button	No	Yes	No	David Fincher	with Kirk Baxter
2010	The Social Network	No	Yes	No	David Fincher	with Kirk Baxter
2011	The Girl with the Dragon Tattoo	No	Yes	No	David Fincher	with Kirk Baxter
2022	Emily the Criminal	Executive	No	No	John Patton Ford	

=== Short films ===
Year	Title	Functioned as	Dir.
Year	Title	Editor	Dir.
1999	Architecture of Reassurance	Yes	Mike Mills
2002	The Hire: Hostage	Yes	John Woo
2016	The Escape	Sup.	Neill Blomkamp
2017	Firebase	Sup.	Neill Blomkamp
2017	Zygote	Sup.	Neill Blomkamp

=== Documentary works ===
Year	Title	Functioned as			Dir.	Notes
Year	Title	Director	Producer	Editor	Dir.	Notes
2010	Tabloid	No	Executive	Yes	Errol Morris	
2013	The Unknown Known	No	Executive	No	Errol Morris	
2015	Winter on Fire: Ukraine's Fight for Freedom	No	Executive	No	Evgeny Afineevsky	
2016	Sky Ladder: The Art of Cai Guo-Qiang	No	Executive	No	Kevin Macdonald	
2016	13th	No	Executive	No	Ava DuVernay	
2016	Long Live Benjamin	No	Executive	No	Terence Butler Jimm Lasser	
2017	Icarus	No	Executive	No	Bryan Fogel	
2017	Voyeur	No	Executive	No	Myles Kane Josh Koury	
2018	Strokes of Genius	No	Executive	No	Andrew Douglas	
2019	Mike Wallace Is Here	No	Executive	No	Avi Belkin	
2019	The Black Godfather	No	Executive	No	Reginald Hudlin	
2020	Freak Power: The Ballot or the Bomb	No	Executive	No	Ajax Phillips; Daniel Joseph Watkins	
2022	Jennifer Lopez: Halftime	No	Yes	No	Amanda Micheli	
2022	Freedom on Fire: Ukraine's Fight for Freedom	No	Executive	No	Evgeny Afineevsky	
2022	A Trip to Infinity	No	Yes	No	Jonathan Halperin; Drew Takahashi	
2022	Is That Black Enough for You?!?	No	Yes	No	Elvis Mitchell	
2023	Temple of Film: 100 Years of the Egyptian Theatre	Yes	No	No	Himself	Short
2023	Mountain Queen: The Summits of Lhakpa Sherpa	No	Executive	No	Lucy Walker	
2023	UnBroken	No	Executive	No	Beth Lane	
2024	The Greatest Night in Pop	No	Executive	No	Bao Nguyen	
2024	Louder: The Soundtrack of Change	No	Yes	No	Kristi Jacobson	
2025	We Are Storror	No	Yes	No	Michael Bay	
2025	Being Eddie	Yes	No	No	Himself	

=== Music videos ===
Year	Title	Artist	Functioned as	
Year	Title	Artist	Director	Editor
1991	"Smells Like Teen Spirit"	Nirvana	No	Yes
1995	"The Diamond Sea"	Sonic Youth	Yes	No
2000	"Don't Tell Me"	Madonna	No	Yes
2005	"Wake Me Up When September Ends"	Green Day	No	Yes

== Awards and nominations ==
Institution	Year	Category	Work	Result	Ref.
Academy Awards	2009	Best Film Editing	The Curious Case of Benjamin Button	Nominated	
Academy Awards	2011	Best Film Editing	The Social Network	Won	
Academy Awards	2012	Best Film Editing	The Girl with the Dragon Tattoo	Won	
American Cinema Editors	2009	Best Edited Feature Film – Dramatic	The Curious Case of Benjamin Button	Nominated	
American Cinema Editors	2011	Best Edited Feature Film – Dramatic	The Social Network	Won	
American Cinema Editors	2012	Best Edited Feature Film – Dramatic	The Girl with the Dragon Tattoo	Nominated	
British Academy Film Awards	2009	Best Editing	The Curious Case of Benjamin Button	Nominated	
British Academy Film Awards	2011	Best Editing	The Social Network	Won	
British Academy Television Craft Awards	2006	Best Titles & Graphic Identity	Rome	Nominated	
Primetime Emmy Awards	2004	Outstanding Title Design	Carnivàle	Won	
Primetime Emmy Awards	2006	Outstanding Title Design	Rome	Nominated	
Primetime Emmy Awards	2006	Outstanding Title Design	Big Love	Nominated	
Primetime Emmy Awards	2011	Outstanding Title Design	Game of Thrones	Won	
Primetime Emmy Awards	2017	Outstanding Motion Design	13th	Won	
Primetime Emmy Awards	2017	Outstanding Documentary or Nonfiction Special	13th	Won	
Primetime Emmy Awards	2018	Outstanding Title Design	The Alienist	Nominated	
Primetime Emmy Awards	2019	Outstanding Title Design	Game of Thrones	Won	
Primetime Emmy Awards	2020	Outstanding Title Design	The Morning Show	Nominated	
Primetime Emmy Awards	2020	Outstanding Unstructured Reality Program	Kevin Hart: Don't F**k This Up	Nominated	
Primetime Emmy Awards	2022	Outstanding Title Design	Pachinko	Nominated	
