= Robert Fyvolent =

American film producer and entertainment lawyer

Robert Fyvolent is an American film producer, screenwriter, and entertainment lawyer. He is known for co-producing Summer of Soul (2021), which won the Academy Award for Best Documentary Feature Film.

== Early life and education ==
Robert Fyvolent is from Tampa, Florida.

He studied political science at Tulane University in New Orleans, Louisiana, where he developed his love of music. He subsequently studied law at South Texas College of Law in Houston, earning a J.D. there, as well as Loyola Law School in Los Angeles, California.

He later undertook Tisch School of the Arts' Intensive Film Workshop in New York.

== Career ==
=== Legal ===
Fyvolent was counsel at Disney and Sony Pictures Entertainment, where he worked in the legal unit for the home video division and later for Screen Gems. He headed business and legal affairs at Newmarket Films for 11 years, working on over 250 films, including Memento, Donnie Darko, The Passion of the Christ, and Whale Rider.

Later, working in private practice, Fyvolent looked after legal production issues on a number of films, including Trumbo (2015), Captain Fantastic (2016), and Cries from Syria (2017).

=== Filmmaking ===
He co-wrote the screenplay for Untraceable (2008), with Mark R. Brinker.

Around 2006 a friend told Fyvolent about Hal Tulchin's unreleased footage of the 1969 Harlem Cultural Festival. Some 15 years later that footage became Summer of Soul (...Or, When the Revolution Could Not Be Televised) (released 2021), which Fyvolent co-produced with David Dinerstein and Joseph Patel. It was directed by hip hop musician Questlove, in his directorial debut. He said his earlier and law studies helped him "recognize the importance of using the Harlem Cultural Festival music and footage to tell this story about lost history and the fight for civil rights."

In 2022, Fyvolent was co-producer on Alice Gu's music documentary film Really Good Rejects, along with Gu, José I. Nuñez, and David Dinerstein. Featuring luthier Reuben Cox, the film premiered in SXSW's "24 Beats Per Second" program.

Screenwriting work includes being the original writer of Untraceable (2008), directed by Greg Hoblit. He has also written for Dreamworks and Millennium Studios.

He executive produced Francesco a feature documentary film about Pope Francis directed by Evgeny Afineevsky. In 2023 he executive produced the director's cut of Freedom on Fire: Ukraine's Fight for Freedom, another documentary directed by Afineevsky, about the Russo-Ukrainian war.

== Recognition and awards ==
Summer of Soul won the Independent Spirit Award for Best Documentary Feature in 2021. In 2022, it won the Academy Award for Best Documentary Feature Film, Grammy Award for Best Music Film, and the Producers Guild of America Award for Best Documentary Motion Picture at the 33rd Producers Guild of America Awards.

== Other roles and memberships ==
Fyvolent is a member of the Writers Guild of America.
