= 2020 in religion =

This is a timeline of events during the year 2020 which relate to religion.

== Events ==
- 3 February – The Ljubljana Mosque, the first mosque to be built in Slovenia, opens in Ljubljana.
- 4 February – The Shri Ram Janmabhoomi Teerth Kshetra trust is announced for the construction of the Ram Mandir temple in Ayodhya, India.
- 23 February – Riots break out in Delhi, in which Hindu rioters randomly attack and kill Muslims.
- 1 June – U.S. President Donald Trump oversees the tear gassing of protesters to visit a church.
- 22 June – The Main Cathedral of the Russian Armed Forces is opened.
- 10 July – Hagia Sophia is converted from a museum to a mosque.
- 8 October – The Ghazanchetsots Cathedral is shelled during the Battle of Shusha in Nagorno-Karabakh.
- 16 October – A French schoolteacher is murdered for allegedly displaying a depiction of Muhammed in class.
- 21 October – The documentary Francesco is released, in which Pope Francis makes comments endorsing protections for same-sex civil unions.
- 29 October – As Islamic terrorist attacks the Notre-Dame de Nice in Nice.
- 2 November – The Votanikos Mosque opens in Athens.
- 30 December – The Islamic Defenders Front is banned in Indonesia for its involvement in Islamic terrorism.

== See also ==
- 2020 in Vatican City
- Impact of the COVID-19 pandemic on religion
