= Outreach (disambiguation) =

Outreach is the provision of services to populations who lack access.

Outreach may also refer to:

- Outreach (magazine), a Christian magazine
- Outreach Catholic, an LGBT Catholic advocacy group
- Outreach Judaism, a counter-missionary organization
- Jewish outreach
- Science outreach
