= Den Tolmor =

American filmmaker and writer

- Born: Moldova
- Occupation: Film producer
- Years active: 1999–present
- Notable work: Winter on Fire: Ukraine's Fight for Freedom

Den Tolmor is a Moldova-born American film producer, director, and writer, whose work includes feature films, television series, and documentaries. Tolmor is best known for producing Winter on Fire: Ukraine's Fight for Freedom, a 2015 documentary film about the Euromaidan protests in Ukraine in the winter of 2013 and 2014, which earned him an Oscar Nomination for Best Documentary Feature and a Primetime Emmy Award nomination in the Exceptional Merit in Documentary Filmmaking category in 2016. Throughout his career, Tolmor has frequently collaborated with Oscar-nominated Israeli-American director Evgeny Afineevsky, also producing the 2017 documentary film Cries from Syria about the Syrian civil war. Narrated by Helen Mirren, the film was an official selection of the Sundance Film Festival where it premiered in 2017 and was acquired by HBO. Tolmor produced Francesco, a 2020 documentary film about Pope Francis that tells the story of hope inside the darkness of our times. Righetto, Tolmor's most recent feature film, entered pre-production in Italy in 2020.

== Early career and work in Russia ==
He has produced several daily and weekly shows, including some of the highest rated series on Russian Television: Pepel [Ash] (2012), Voenni Hospital [Military Hospital] (2012), and Tzena Jizni [The Price of Life] (2014). Tolmor also created Ekstrasensy protiv detektivov [Psychics versus Detectives] (2016), a first-of-its-kind television program that challenged individuals with extrasensory perception, such as physics and clairvoyants, to compete against trained detectives and criminologists to investigate and solve real criminal cases.

== Documentaries on Ukraine and Syria ==
Tolmor's historical feature documentary Winter on Fire was an official selection of the Venice and Telluride international film festivals, received the People's Choice Award for the Best Documentary from the Toronto International Film Festival, the 2016 Television Academy Honors Award and was nominated for both an Academy Award in the Best Documentary category and the Primetime Emmy Awards in the Exceptional Merit in Documentary Filmmaking category. The film covered the Euromaidan protests in Ukraine during the Ukraine crisis from November 2013 to February 2014, detailing the student uprising that transformed into a violent revolution. It also looked at the shady negotiations between Ukraine's corrupt former president, Viktor Yanukovich, and Russian president Vladimir Putin that kept Ukraine from joining the European Union, largely catering towards an anti-Moscow position.

Cries from Syria is a documentary about the Syrian Civil War. It contains video shot by Syrians with and interviews with guerilla fighters, activists, journalists, defected military men, and refugees, some that are children. The film was an Official Selection of the 2017 Sundance Film Festival, where it had its world premiere. The US TV rights for the film were acquired by HBO, and it debuted on March 13, 2017, available on HBO NOW, HBO GO, HBO On Demand and affiliate portals. On November 21, 2017, the Producers Guild of America named Tolmor among the nominees for the Outstanding Producer of Documentary Motion Pictures Award for Cries from Syria. The film also earned IPA Satellite Awards nominations for Best Documentary and Best Song in a Documentary for Prayers For This World, performed by Cher. The Awards Circuit Community Awards nominated Cries from Syria as the Best Documentary Feature for 2017. The film won the International Documentary Association's Courage Under Fire Award, along with a Humanitas Prize and Cinema for Peace Awards as Most Valuable Documentary of the Year and the Overseas Press Club's Peter Jennings Award. It also won Best Documentary at the 32nd Fort Lauderdale International Film Festival and the Gold Remi Award at the 51st Houston WorldFest Film Festival. In 2018, Tolmor and his movie Cries from Syria earned four Emmy nominations, including Outstanding Current Affairs Documentary.

== Short films ==
Tolmor produced the 2018 short film 9.8 m/s2, directed by Michael Vaynberg and starring Pasha Lychnikoff, Lyanka Gryu, and Michael Sirow. The film premiered at Cannes Film Festival in 2018 and was shortlisted for the Sundance International Film Festival that year. As of 2021, it has received over 74 nominations and awards at international film festivals, including Best Drama at New York Shorts International Film Festival in 2018 and Silver in the Best Short Film category at the 16th Annual ReelHeART International Film Festival in Toronto in 2019.

== Francesco ==
Tolmor's 2020 film Francesco premiered at the Rome Film Festival on October 21, 2020, and had its North American premiere at the Savannah Film Festival on October 25, 2020. It won Best Documentary and the President's Award at the 2020 Fort Lauderdale International Film Festival. Directed by Afineevsky, the film looks at the pressing challenges of the 21st century through the eyes of Pope Francis. Born in Argentina, Francis is the first leader of the Catholic Church to come from the Americas and the Jesuit order. His teachings bring a progressive take on issues like the climate crisis, immigration, LGBTQ support, economic equality, and religious tolerance. Francesco showcases a voice of morality that serves as a powerful counterbalance to the rise of reactionary politics around the world. As Deadline reported, when the film premiered “the Catholic press and then secular media picked up on something the pope told Afineevsky in the film: Gay people should be allowed to form civil unions. The Catholic Church traditionally has been hostile to homosexual activity, calling it “deviant behavior. It has preached acceptance of gay people but called the idea of conferring legal status on same sex unions an attack on the family. What Pope Francis told Afineevsky contradicted that orthodoxy.” As the National Catholic Reporter describes, “Although it also tells much of the wider story of the papacy of the former Argentinian Cardinal Jorge Bergoglio, it focuses most on how the pope from Buenos Aires has affected those he has met in places around the world.”

== Filmography ==
=== Films ===
- Winter on Fire (2015)
- Cries from Syria (2017)
- Francesco (2020)
- Righetto (2020)

=== TV Series ===
- Pepel [Ash] (2012)
- Voenni Hospital [Military Hospital] (2012)
- Otkrovenia [Revelations] (2012)
- Tzena Jizni [The Price of Life] (2014)
- Ekstrasensy protiv detektivov [Psychics versus Detectives] (2016)
