= Aaron I. Butler =

American film producer

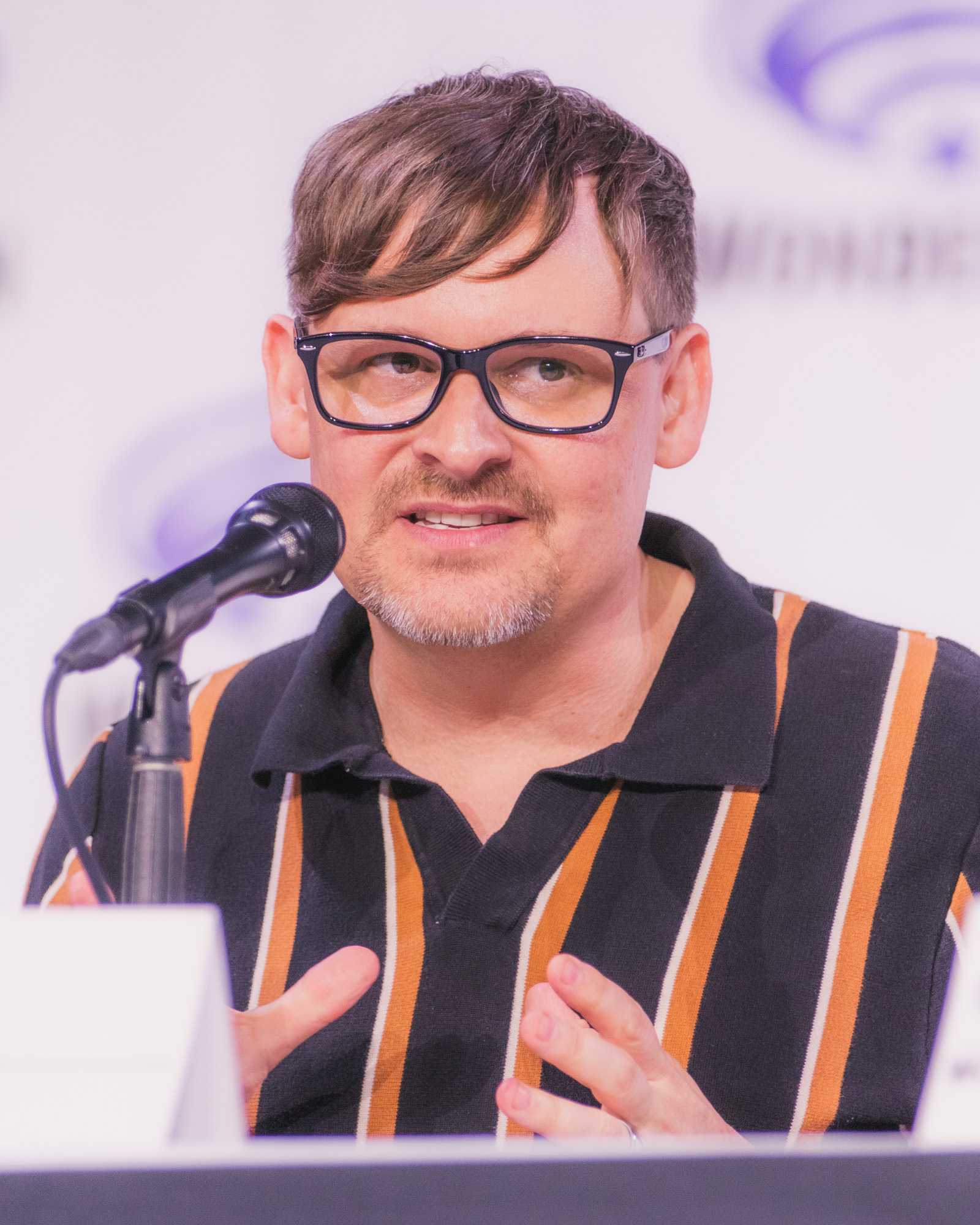
Butler in 2026

Aaron I. Butler is an American film and television editor and producer.

Butler graduated from UC Berkeley and began his career working with two-time Academy Award-nominated director Bill Jersey at the Saul Zaentz Film Center in Berkeley. His first broadcast editor credit was Learning To Fly (1999) which won gold medals at the U.S. International Film Festival and the New York Festivals. He also edited on the documentary series The Rise and Fall of Jim Crow (2002). The series won a Peabody Award and the IDA Award for Best Limited Series and was nominated for three News and Documentary Emmys.

Butler moved to Los Angeles where he edited the Sundance Channel documentary series Pleasure for Sale (2008), followed by the final season HBO's Taxicab Confessions (2010). He then edited and produced the HBO documentary American Winter (2013) and was nominated for a News and Documentary Emmy and an ACE Eddie Award for it. J. Butler then edited on the Showtime documentary series Time of Death (2013) which won Best Limited Series at the IDA Awards and the Showtime documentary L Word Mississippi: Hate the Sin (2014) which won Outstanding Documentary at the GLAAD Media Awards. He also edited the final episode of The Sixties (2014) which was nominated for Best Limited Series at the IDA Awards.

Butler began editing features starting with I Am Michael (2015) which was executive produced by Gus Van Sant and premiered at the Sundance Film Festival. I Am Michael was nominated for Best First Feature at the Berlinale International Film Festival. The next feature he edited was In Dubious Battle (2016) directed by James Franco. It premiered at the Venice Film Festival and won the Fondazione Mimmo Rotella Award.

Next Butler produced the documentary feature Out of Iraq (2016). He then edited and produced the theatrical documentary feature Cries From Syria (2017) with Oscar nominated director Evgeny Afineevsky. The film premiered at the Sundance Film Festival and aired on HBO. Butler won the Peter Jennings Award from the Overseas Press Club, and was nominated for an ACE Eddie Award, a PGA Award, and two News and Documentary Emmy Awards for his work on Cries From Syria.

Butler's latest feature is JT Leroy (2018). The film was written and directed by Justin Kelly and stars Laura Dern, Kristen Stewart, and Diane Kruger.

Butler is a member of the American Cinema Editors and is represented by the Gersh Agency.
