= Pope Francis and LGBTQ topics =

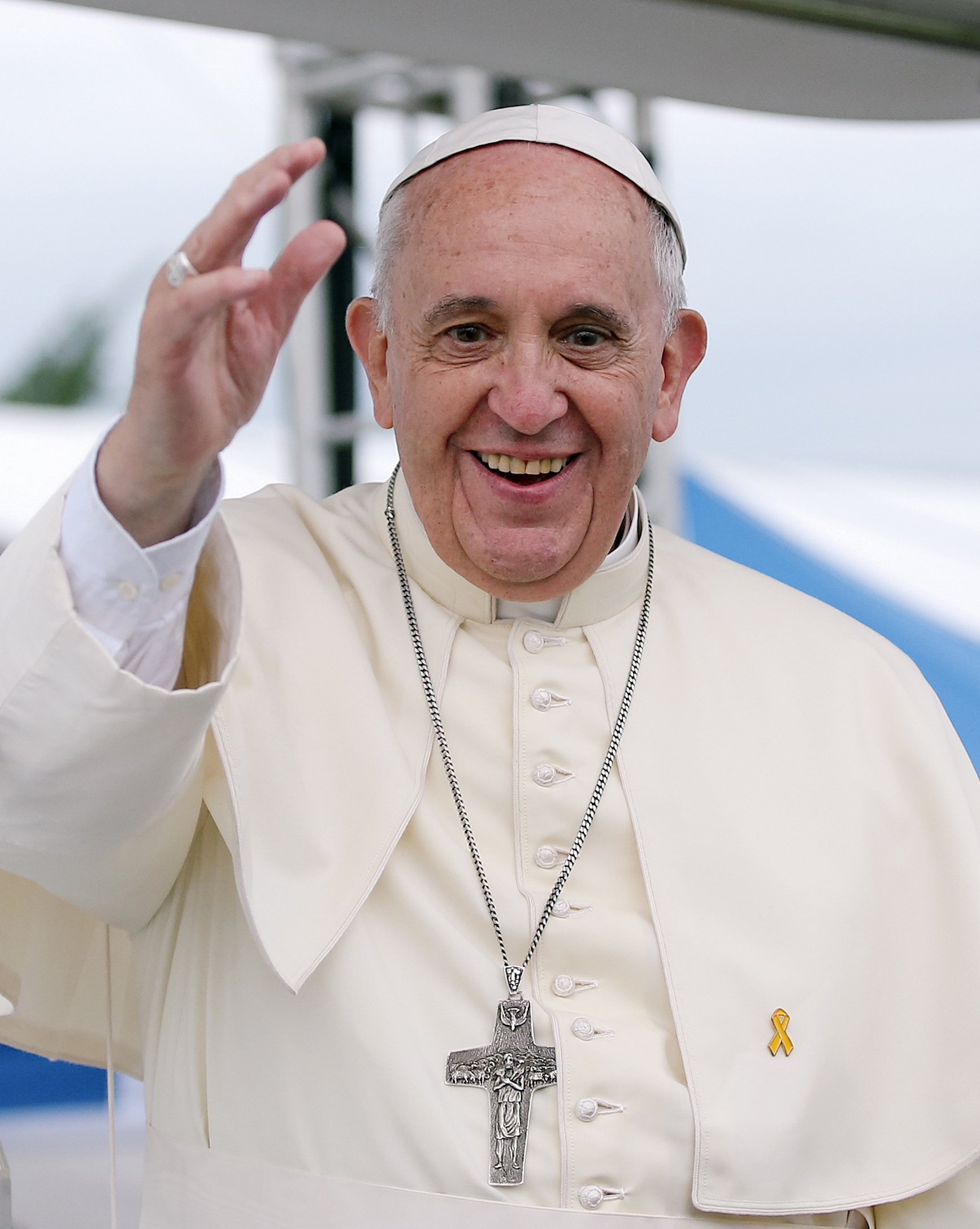
Pope Francis in 2014

Pope Francis, the head of the Catholic Church from 2013 to 2025, adopted a significantly more accommodating tone on LGBTQ topics than his predecessors. In July 2013, his televised "Who am I to judge?" statement was widely reported in the international press, becoming one of his most famous statements on LGBTQ people. In other public statements, Francis emphasised the need to accept, welcome, and accompany LGBTQ people, including LGBTQ children, and denounced laws criminalising homosexuality. While he reiterated traditional Catholic teaching that marriage is between a man and a woman, he had supported same-sex civil unions as legal protections for same-sex couples. Under his pontificate, the Dicastery for the Doctrine of the Faith confirmed that transgender people can be baptised, and allowed the blessing of same-sex couples in the document Fiducia supplicans. Francis privately met many LGBTQ people and activists. In 2013, Francis was named as Person of the Year by The Advocate, an American LGBTQ magazine.

He described gender theory and children's education on gender-affirming surgery as "ideological colonisation". In September 2015, Francis came under media scrutiny for meeting Kim Davis, a county clerk who was imprisoned for refusing to issue marriage licences for same-sex couples, and in August 2018, Francis was criticised for suggesting that gay children seek psychiatric treatment. Prior to his election as Pope and adoption of the name Francis, as Archbishop of Buenos Aires, Jorge Mario Bergoglio led public opposition to the parliamentary bill on legalising same-sex marriage in Argentina, which was approved by the Argentine Senate on 15 July 2010. A letter he wrote in that campaign was criticised for using "medieval" and "obscurantist" language, and was later admitted by an episcopal source to be a strategic error that contributed to the bill's success.

== Public statements on LGBTQ topics ==
=== "Who am I to judge?" ===
On 28 July 2013, at a televised press conference on a return flight from World Youth Day in Brazil, speaking on theories of a gay lobby in the Vatican, Francis said:

If someone is gay and is searching for the Lord and has good will, then who am I to judge him? The Catechism of the Catholic Church explains this in a beautiful way, saying ... "no one should marginalize these people for this, they must be integrated into society". The problem is not having this tendency, no, we must be brothers and sisters to one another, and there is this one and there is that one.

— Pope Francis, Press conference of Pope Francis during the papal flight, 28 July 2013

Francis' comments were widely reported in the popular press, becoming one of his most famous statements on LGBTQ people. Welcoming the comments, LGBTQ group Gay Catholic Voice Ireland said "that this is the first time a pope has used the word 'gay', a word originating from within the LGBTQ community, rather than 'homosexual', a word originating from the medical profession". Another LGBTQ group, Equally Blessed, called it "some of the most encouraging words a pontiff has ever spoken about gay and lesbian people".

In a televised interview on LaSexta in March 2019, Francis replied when asked on the soundbite: "Tendencies are not sin. If you have a tendency to anger, it's not a sin. Now, if you are angry and hurt people, the sin is there".

=== On welcoming LGBTQ people ===
In a series of interviews with Jesuit priest Antonio Spadaro in August 2013, Francis said that the Church did not want to condemn homosexual persons to social exclusion. He said that endorsing the existence of gay people with love is to "enter into the mystery of the human being", and advocated accompanying people as God does:

A person once asked me, in a provocative manner, if I approved of homosexuality. I replied with another question: 'Tell me: when God looks at a gay person, does he endorse the existence of this person with love, or reject and condemn this person?' We must always consider the person.

— Pope Francis, Interview with La Civiltà Cattolica, August 2013

On 2 October 2016, during an in-flight press conference while returning from his visit to Georgia and Azerbaijan, Francis said: "Individuals have to be accompanied, as Jesus accompanies them. When a person who has this condition [of homosexual tendencies] comes before Jesus, Jesus certainly does not say: 'Go away because you are homosexual'." Francis discussed his invitation to meet a transgender Spanish man and his wife as an example of how LGBTQ people can be welcomed, accompanied, and integrated into the Church.

In May 2022, in response to a series of questions from Outreach, a Catholic LGBTQ organisation, Francis said that God "does not disown any of his children". Francis advised LGBTQ people to read the Acts of the Apostles to "find the image of the living Church", and suggested that LGBTQ Catholics suffered not "rejection of the church" but rejection by "people in the church".

=== Criminalisation of homosexuality ===
In January 2023, in an interview with the Associated Press, Francis called the criminalisation of homosexuality "unjust", calling on the Catholic Church to work towards its abolition by "distinguish[ing] between a sin and crime". He called on bishops supporting such laws to "have a process of conversion".

In February 2023, during an in-flight press conference, Francis called laws criminalising homosexuality a sin: "This is not right. Persons with homosexual tendencies are children of God. God loves them. God accompanies them ... condemning a person like this is a sin. Criminalising people with homosexual tendencies is an injustice." Following a request for clarification by Jesuit priest James Martin, Francis replied in a letter that "every sexual act outside of marriage is a sin", but "criminalisation is neither good nor just" and "I would tell whoever wants to criminalise homosexuality that they are wrong".

=== LGBTQ children ===
In an interview with La Nación in December 2014, following the Synod on the Family, Francis said that "the synod addressed the family and the homosexual persons in relation to their families, because we come across this reality all the time in the confessional ... We have to find a way to help that father or that mother to stand by their [homosexual] son or daughter".

On 26 August 2018, on a return flight from his visit to Ireland, Francis observed: "There have always been homosexuals and persons with homosexual tendencies. Always." He said that parents should neither deny nor disown their homosexual children:

Pray. Don't condemn, [but] dialogue, understand, make room for [your] son or daughter. Make room for them to say what they have to say ... I would never say that silence is the answer; to ignore a son or daughter with a homosexual tendency is not good parenthood.

— Pope Francis, Press conference on the return flight from Dublin to Rome, 26 August 2018

During the same conference, Francis suggested that gay children could seek psychiatric treatment, saying: "When [a homosexual trait] shows itself from childhood, there is a lot that can be done through psychiatry, to see how things are. It is something else if it shows itself after twenty years." The mention of psychiatry was criticised by LGBTQ organisations, including the LSVD. The reference was not included in the Vatican's published transcript of the conference. A Vatican spokesperson said that the reference was removed "so as not to distort the Pope's train of thought", and that Francis mentioned psychiatry "to highlight an example of 'things that can be done' [but] didn't mean to say that [homosexuality] was a 'mental illness'". Asked about his comments in a televised interview on LaSexta in March 2019, Francis said that he was recommending "parents start[ing] to see strange things" to have their child evaluated by a professional, because "it could be that [the child] is not homosexual", but the media had misreported and distorted his comments. When asked if it was a "rarity" for parents to have a gay child, Francis said: "In theory, no."

In Francesco (2020), Francis said: "Homosexuals have a right to be a part of the family. They're children of God ... Nobody should be thrown out, or be made miserable because of it."

=== LGBTQ topics in pastoral ministry ===
In his August 2013 interviews with Spadaro, Francis said that the Catholic Church "cannot insist only on issues related to abortion, gay marriage and the use of contraceptive methods":

But when we speak about these issues, we have to talk about them in a context. The teaching of the Church, for that matter, is clear and I am a son of the Church, but it is not necessary to talk about these issues all the time ... The Church's pastoral ministry cannot be obsessed with the transmission of a disjointed multitude of doctrines to be imposed insistently. Proclamation in a missionary style focuses on the essentials, on the necessary things: this is also what fascinates and attracts more, what makes the heart burn, as it did for the disciples at Emmaus. We have to find a new balance; otherwise, even the moral edifice of the church is likely to fall like a house of cards, losing the freshness and fragrance of the Gospel.

— Pope Francis, Interview with Antonio Spadaro, August 2013

On 3 January 2014, La Civiltà Cattolica, a Jesuit magazine, published a transcript of Francis' comments at a closed-door meeting with 120 superiors-general of worldwide religious orders on 29 November 2013. Francis emphasised the importance of education in the Church's ministry to children brought up in a multiplicity of household arrangements, and said:

I remember the case of a very sad little girl who finally confided to her teacher the reason for her state of mind: 'My mother's girlfriend/fiancée (Italian: fidanzata) doesn't like me.' ... How can we proclaim Christ to these boys and girls? How can we proclaim Christ to a generation that is changing? We must be careful not to administer a vaccine against faith to them.

— Pope Francis, Meeting with superiors-general, 29 November 2013

== Public statements on same-sex relationships ==
=== As Archbishop of Buenos Aires ===
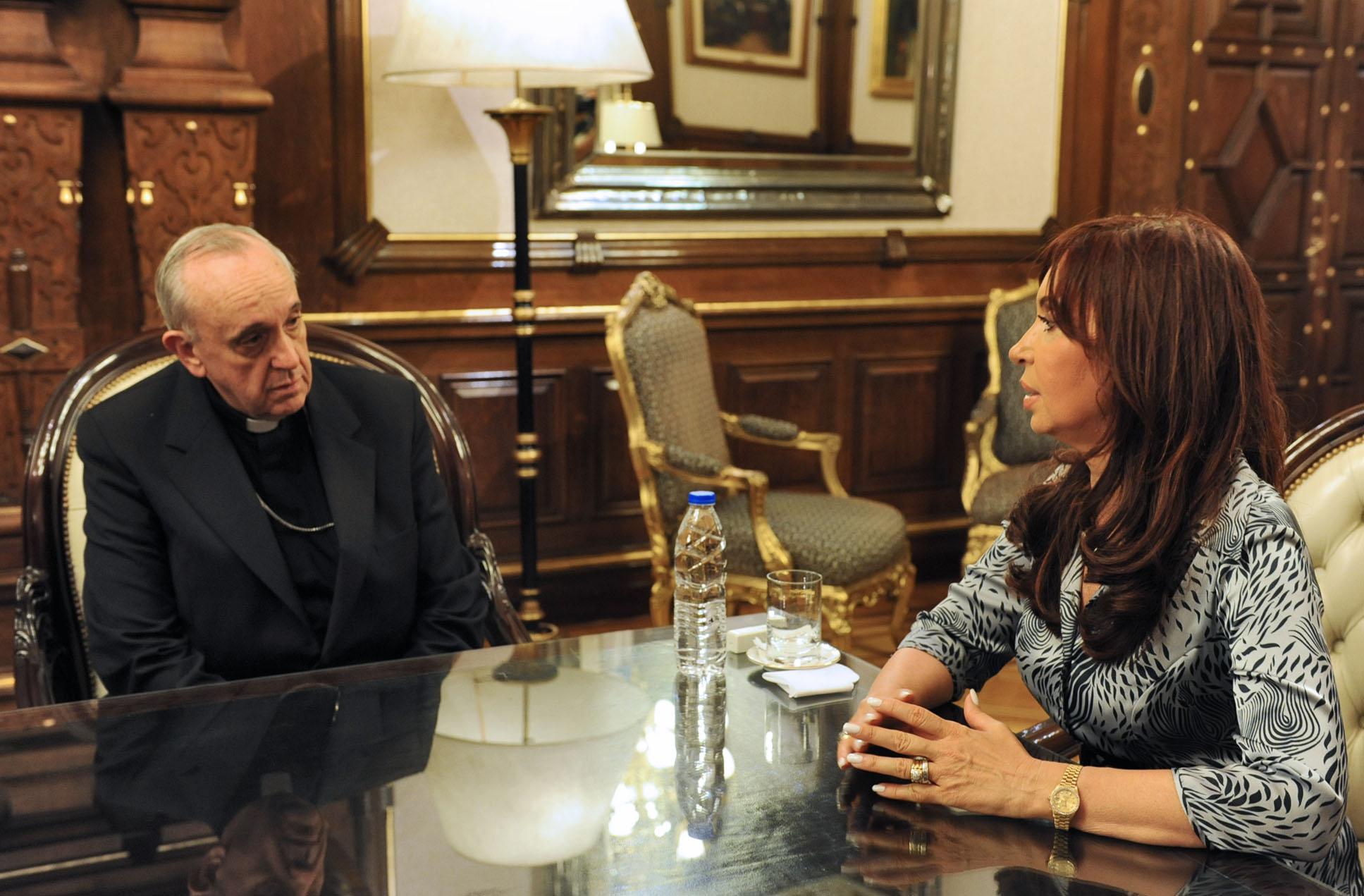
Bergoglio with President Cristina Fernández de Kirchner, whose government introduced same-sex marriage in Argentina, in March 2010

As Archbishop of Buenos Aires, Jorge Mario Bergoglio led public opposition to the parliamentary bill on legalising same-sex marriage in Argentina, which was approved by the Argentine Senate on 15 July 2010. At the time of Francis' election in 2013, Sergio Rubin, his authorised biographer, reported that Bergoglio urged his fellow Argentine bishops to endorse same-sex civil unions, as a compromise to calls for same-sex marriage. Other bishops rejected his proposal, committing the Argentine church to opposing the legislation. It was the only vote Bergoglio lost in his six years as president of the Episcopal Conference of Argentina. Rubin's account was denied by Miguel Woites, director of a news outlet linked to the archdiocese, and corroborated by other Argentine Catholic journalists. Others with whom Bergoglio had met privately attested to his openness to same-sex civil unions. In the feature-length documentary Francesco (2020), Francis confirmed Rubin's account, saying that he "stood up" for legislation protecting gay couples in civil relationships.

In a letter to Carmelite nuns published by the Archdiocese of Buenos Aires, Bergoglio called the bill on same-sex marriage "an attempt to destroy God's plan", authored by "the father of lies who seeks to confuse and deceive the children of God". Critics, including Nicolás Alessio, a priest defrocked for supporting the legislation, and Marcelo Fuentes, a senator, called the letter "medieval" and "obscurantist". The letter was interpreted to have solidified support for the bill, and was later admitted to be a strategic error by an episcopal source.

In conversation with Abraham Skorka in their coauthored book On Heaven and Earth (2010), Bergoglio described same-sex marriage as "a weakening of the institution of marriage, an institution that has existed for thousands of years and is 'forged according to nature and anthropology'". Bergoglio also said that there would be "affected children" by same-sex couples with adoption rights: "Every person needs a male father and a female mother that can help them shape their identity."

=== Same-sex civil unions ===
In January 2014, following the publication of Francis' comments in his meeting with superiors-general in November 2013, Italian media reported that Francis expressed support for same-sex civil unions, intervening in legislative efforts to recognise same-sex unions in Italy. In the transcript, Francis mentioned a girl who felt rejected by her mother's lesbian partner, but la fidanzata could mean either a girlfriend or fiancée in Italian. The Holy See Press Office denied any interpretation of Francis' comments as supporting same-sex civil unions. In March 2014, the press office again denied media reports that Francis signalled his support for same sex civil-unions following an interview with Corriere della Sera, in which Francis said that civil unions responded to "different situations of cohabitation", but reaffirmed the Church's teaching that marriage is between a man and a woman.

In his apostolic exhortation Amoris laetitia (2016), Francis reflected that "de facto or same-sex unions ... may not simply be equated with marriage. No union that is temporary or closed to the transmission of life can ensure the future of society."

In Francesco (2020), Francis advocated "civil union law[s]" (Spanish: ley de convivencia civil) to ensure that gay people are "legally covered". Francis had made the comments in a May 2019 interview with Televisa, but they only premiered at the Rome Film Festival on 21 October 2020. The Vatican neither confirmed or denied reports that it cut the quote from the original footage in May 2019, shot by its cameras, while Evgeny Afineevsky, the documentary director, had access to it in the Vatican archives. Franco Coppola, the Apostolic Nuncio to Mexico, later said that the comments referred to Francis' support for civil unions before his election as pope, such that the documentary spliced two different responses together to remove their crucial context. The comments were welcomed by a spokesperson for António Guterres, Secretary-General of the United Nations, and the Ozanne Foundation, a British LGBTQ organisation. In the Philippines, a spokesperson for President Rodrigo Duterte said that Francis' comments should empower Catholics to support an expansion of LGBTQ rights in the Philippines. Augustino Torres, a CFR priest in New York, said that Francis' words were mistranslated, and that Francis supported civil coexistence laws rather than civil union laws. In an explanatory post shared by the Episcopal Conference of Argentina, Víctor Manuel Fernández, Archbishop of La Plata and Francis' theological advisor, said that the phrases unión civil and ley de convivencia civil are used interchangeably in Argentina.

On 15 September 2021, during a press conference aboard a papal flight returning from his visit to Hungary and Slovakia, Francis said that civil laws can help "those who have a diverse sexual orientation" by offering them "safety, stability, [and] inheritance". He reiterated that marriage is a sacrament between a man and a woman.

=== Same-sex marriage ===
Charles Scicluna, Auxiliary Bishop of Malta, reported that Francis called same-sex marriage an "anthropological regression" in a private interview in December 2013. In an interview with La Nación in December 2014, Francis said that "nobody mentioned homosexual marriage" at the Synod on the Family because "it did not cross our minds".

On 16 January 2015, in a meeting with families in Manila during his visit to the Philippines, Francis said that the family was "threatened by growing efforts on the part of some to redefine the very institution of marriage, by relativism, by the culture of the ephemeral, by a lack of openness to life". He warned against "an ideological colonisation we have to be careful of that tries to destroy the family". Though Francis' speech did not reference same-sex marriage, these comments were interpreted as a criticism of it.

At his general audience on 4 February 2015, Francis greeted "the Slovak pilgrims and, through them, I wish to express my appreciation to the entire Slovak Church, encouraging everyone to follow ... in defence of the family, the vital cell of society". The greeting came three days before a referendum in Slovakia to affirm restrictions on same-sex marriage and same-sex adoption; the referendum, supported by many Catholic groups, was boycotted by LGBTQ groups.

On 14 June 2015, in a speech to 25,000 visitors to Rome's diocesan conference, Francis emphasised the "great treasure" of "diversity that becomes complementarity and reciprocity" in heterosexual marriages, emphasising "the 'first' and most fundamental difference [between men and women], constitutive of the human being". While not explicitly mentioning same-sex parents, the speech's timing, a day after Rome's Pride parade, was interpreted to criticise non-heterosexual marriages.

In Amoris laetitia (2016), Francis reiterated a 2003 document by the Congregation for the Doctrine of the Faith, which said that "[T]here are absolutely no grounds for considering homosexual unions to be in any way similar or even remotely analogous to God's plan for marriage and family".

=== Blessings for same-sex couples ===
On 25 September 2023, in a responsum to conservative cardinals before the 16th World Synod of Bishops, Francis signalled the Church's openness to blessings for gay couples as long as they did not misrepresent the Catholic view of marriage as between one man and one woman. On 18 December 2023, the Dicastery for the Doctrine of the Faith published Fiducia supplicans, a declaration allowing Catholic priests to bless people who are not considered to be married by the Church, including same-sex couples. While the declaration was welcomed by many Catholics, it also sparked considerable controversy and criticism, with several bishops' conferences barring the blessings in their jurisdictions or asking priests to refrain from them.

At a closed-door meeting with 800 Roman clergy on 13 January 2024, Francis stated that LGBTQ associations could not be blessed. He added that the reason why the measure on the blessings of same-sex couples in Fiducia supplicans was rejected in Africa was that "[t]he culture [in Africa] does not accept it". As a comparison on blessing homosexuals, he said: "When we bless an entrepreneur, we do not ask if he has stolen". The next day, Francis answered questions on Fiducia supplicans in an interview on Che tempo che fa, saying that "the Lord blesses everyone who is capable of being baptised, that is, every person", and that such blessings invite people "to see what the road is that the Lord proposes to them". On 26 January 2024, addressing the annual plenary assembly of the Dicastery, Francis emphasised that the purpose of the blessings discussed in the document was to "concretely show the closeness of the Lord and the Church to all those who, finding themselves in different situations, ask for help to continue – sometimes to begin – a journey of faith".

== Gay clergy ==
In June 2013, a group of Latin American clerics reported that in a private meeting, Francis had acknowledged the existence of a gay lobby in the Vatican, which was advancing its personal interests and leaving the Holy See vulnerable to blackmail. Francis promised to "see what we can do". An organisation representing the clerics apologised to Francis for the report's publication. In his in-flight press conference on 28 July 2013, the same which led to Francis' famous "Who am I to judge?" soundbite, Francis said:

So much is written about the gay lobby. I still haven't found anyone with an identity card in the Vatican with 'gay' on it. They say there are some there. I believe that when you are dealing with such a person, you must distinguish between the fact of a person being gay and the fact of someone forming a lobby, because not all lobbies are good. This one is not good.

— Pope Francis, Press conference of Pope Francis during the papal flight, 28 July 2013

In the same conference, Francis signalled his openness to clergy who had committed homosexual acts that they later repented, distinguishing between "sins from youth" and crimes, such as child sexual abuse.

In The Strength of a Vocation: Consecrated Life Today (2018), a book edited from interviews with Francis, Francis described homosexuality in the clergy as "something I am concerned about" and "a very serious issue that must be adequately discerned from the beginning with the candidates [for priesthood]". Francis affirmed that "the Church recommends that people with that kind of ingrained tendency should not be accepted into the ministry or consecrated life":

[We] have to urge homosexual priests, and men and women religious, to live celibacy with integrity, and above all, that they be impeccably responsible, trying to never scandalise either their communities or the faithful holy people of God by living a double life. It's better for them to leave the ministry or the consecrated life rather than to live a double life.

— Pope Francis, The Strength of a Vocation: Consecrated Life Today (2018)

On 27 May 2024, during a closed door meeting of the Episcopal Conference of Italy, the Pope used the phrase "C'è già troppa frociaggine" when replying to a question about the admittance of gay men as seminarians. The phrase translates to "there is already too much faggotry", the last word being a slur for gay men. Italian is not Francis' native language, and there have been other instances where he made linguistic gaffes by using slang words. The Vatican released an apology on behalf of Francis in response to this controversy. On 12 June 2024, the pope was accused of using the same slur ("frociaggine") in another closed-door meeting.

== Public statements on gender and transgender topics ==
=== Gender-affirming surgery ===
In an address to Polish bishops in Kraków Cathedral on 27 July 2016, later published by the Vatican, Francis denounced the "ideological colonisation" of children being taught about gender-affirming surgery:

In Europe, America, Latin America, Africa, and in some countries of Asia, there are genuine forms of ideological colonisation taking place. And one of these - I will call it clearly by its name – is [the ideology of] "gender". Today children – children! – are taught in school that everyone can choose his or her sex. Why are they teaching this? Because the books are provided by the persons and institutions that give you money. These forms of ideological colonisation are also supported by influential countries. And this [is] terrible!

— Pope Francis, Address to the meeting with the Polish bishops, 27 July 2016

At an audience with the Pontifical Academy for Life on 5 October 2017, Francis condemned "the biological and psychical manipulation of sexual difference, which biomedical technology allows us to perceive as completely available to free choice – which it is not!" Francis' comments were criticised by Catholic LGBTQ organisations, including New Ways Ministry and DignityUSA.

On 31 October 2023, Francis approved a document from the Dicastery for the Doctrine of the Faith. Responding to questions from José Negri, Bishop of Santo Amaro, the document said that transgender people could be baptised, be godparents at a baptism, and be witnesses at weddings, so long as such situations would not cause scandal. In September 2015, the Dicastery upheld the refusal of Rafael Zornoza, Bishop of Cádiz and Ceuta, to permit an openly transgender man to be a godfather to his nephew at a baptism.

=== "Gender theory" and "gender ideology" ===
In Pope Francis: This Economy Kills (2015), a book edited by Andrea Tornielli and Giacomo Galeazzi reporting extensive interviews with Francis, Francis compared "genetic manipulation" and "the [sic] gender theory" to nuclear weapons, calling them "a new sin, that against God the Creator" that "does not recognise the order of creation", whose design "is written in nature".

At a meeting of young people in Naples on 21 March 2015, Francis called gender theory "the mistake of the human mind ... creating so much confusion". At a general audience the following month, he said:

I ask myself, if the so-called gender theory is not, at the same time, an expression of frustration and resignation, which seeks to cancel out sexual difference because it no longer knows how to confront it. Yes, we risk taking a step backwards. The removal of difference in fact creates a problem, not a solution. In order to resolve the problems in their relationships, men and women need to speak to one another more, listen to each other more, get to know one another better, love one another more.

— Pope Francis, General audience, 15 April 2015

During his 2016 pastoral visit to Georgia and Azerbaijan, Francis told a conference of priests and nuns that teaching gender theory in schools was part of a "global war" against marriage. In the press conference aboard the papal flight home on 2 October 2016, he called gender theory "against the realities of nature", warning that schools teaching gender theory "to change people's way of thinking [is] 'ideological colonisation'". Francis also stressed the importance of welcoming and accompanying transgender people.

Speaking on gender theory at an audience on 1 March 2024, Francis said that he had "asked that studies be carried out into this ugly ideology of our times", saying that "cancelling out the differences [between genders] means cancelling our humanity". On 8 April 2024, the Vatican published Dignitas Infinita which condemned "gender theory" and "sex-change" surgery as violations against human dignity. Sister Jeannine Gramick SL, a leading member of New Ways Ministry, wrote a letter to Pope Francis to "tell him about my sadness and my disappointment with the use of the concept, 'gender ideology'"; the Pope replied that

Gender ideology is something other than homosexual or transsexual people. Gender ideology makes everyone equal without respect for personal history. I understand the concern about that paragraph in Dignitas Infinita, but it [sic] refers not to transgender people but to gender ideology, which nullifies differences. Transgender people must be accepted and integrated into society.

In response, Gramick

wrote to our beloved pope again, telling him that, unfortunately in the U.S. (and elsewhere in the world), "gender ideology" has a different meaning. It does not mean nullifying or not respecting differences. Quite the opposite is true: Those who use that term do not consider or respect a person's history and experience of gender. [...] the term "gender ideology" is being used in the opposite way from how Pope Francis understands it[...]

== Correspondence and meetings with LGBTQ people and activists ==
By custom, the Vatican does not comment on private conversations with the Pope.

=== LGBTQ groups ===
In October 2013, the Florentine LGBTQ group Kairos said that Francis had replied to a letter that they had sent, assuring them of his blessing. It was the first time that a pope had formally responded to a group of LGBTQ Catholics.

On 16 September 2020, Francis met forty Italian parents of LGBTQ children, part of the Tenda di Gionata association. According to the association's vice-president, Francis said that "the Church does not exclude [LGBTQ children] because she loves them deeply".

On 17 October 2023, in a fifty-minute private audience, Francis met with representatives of New Ways Ministry, a Catholic LGBTQ organisation to which Francis had offered pastoral encouragement in May 2021. In February 2010, the group was the subject of a press release by Cardinal Francis George, President of the United States Conference of Catholic Bishops, which denied that the organisation represented "an authentic interpretation of Catholic teaching" and said that it "confuses the faithful regarding the authentic teaching and ministry of the Church". In December 2021, citing the 2010 press release, resources from the organisation were removed from the website of the Synod on Synodality's website, then restored with an apology from the synod's communications director for the "pain [it brought] to the entire LGBTQ community, who once again felt left out".

=== LGBTQ individuals ===
On 24 January 2015, Francis met Diego Neria Lejarraga, a Spanish civil servant who stopped attending Mass after his sex change led his parish priest and others to reject him. Speaking to CNN, Neria said: "This man loves the world. I think there's not, in his head, in his way of thinking, discrimination against anyone. I'm speaking about him, not the institution." The meeting, in Domus Sanctae Marthae, was believed to be Francis' first private audience with a transgender person.

On 10 July 2015, Francesca Pardi, an Italian publisher of children's LGBTQ books, announced that Francis had sent her an apostolic blessing including Pardi's same-sex partner. Pardi had written to Francis to send him some of her books. The blessing was seen as a sign of acceptance among Italy's LGBTQ community, prompting an official communication from the Vatican that the letter was not "meant to endorse behaviors and teachings unfit to the Gospel".

On 28 April 2018, Francis met three victims of Fernando Karadima, a Chilean Catholic priest who sexually abused children. Speaking to El País, survivor Juan Carlos Cruz reported that Francis told him: "Juan Carlos, it doesn't matter that you are gay. God made you like this and he wants you like this and I don't care. The Pope loves you like this; you have to be happy with who you are". According to Cruz, who was the main whistleblower in Chile's clerical sexual abuse scandal, his sexuality was discussed because it had been used in the popular press to discredit his accusations. The "tremendous" comments were welcomed by Francis DeBernardo of New Ways Ministry, who said that they "would do a lot better if he would make these statements publicly".

On 19 April 2019, Francis appeared on the final episode of Pilgrimage: The Road to Rome, a three-episode miniseries broadcast on BBC Two. Meeting gay comedian Stephen K. Amos, Francis said: "Giving more importance to the adjective rather than the noun, this is not good. We are all human beings and have dignity. It does not matter who you are or how you live your life: you do not lose your dignity. There are people that prefer to select or discard people because of the adjective – these people don't have a human heart".

During the COVID-19 pandemic, the Vatican forged close relations with a group of trans women in Torvaianica, many of whom were from Latin America and working as prostitutes. The women were given privileged seats in Francis' Wednesday general audiences and free handouts of medicine, cash, and shampoo. They received vaccinations through the Holy See before most Italians.

=== LGBTQ supporters ===
==== James J. Martin ====
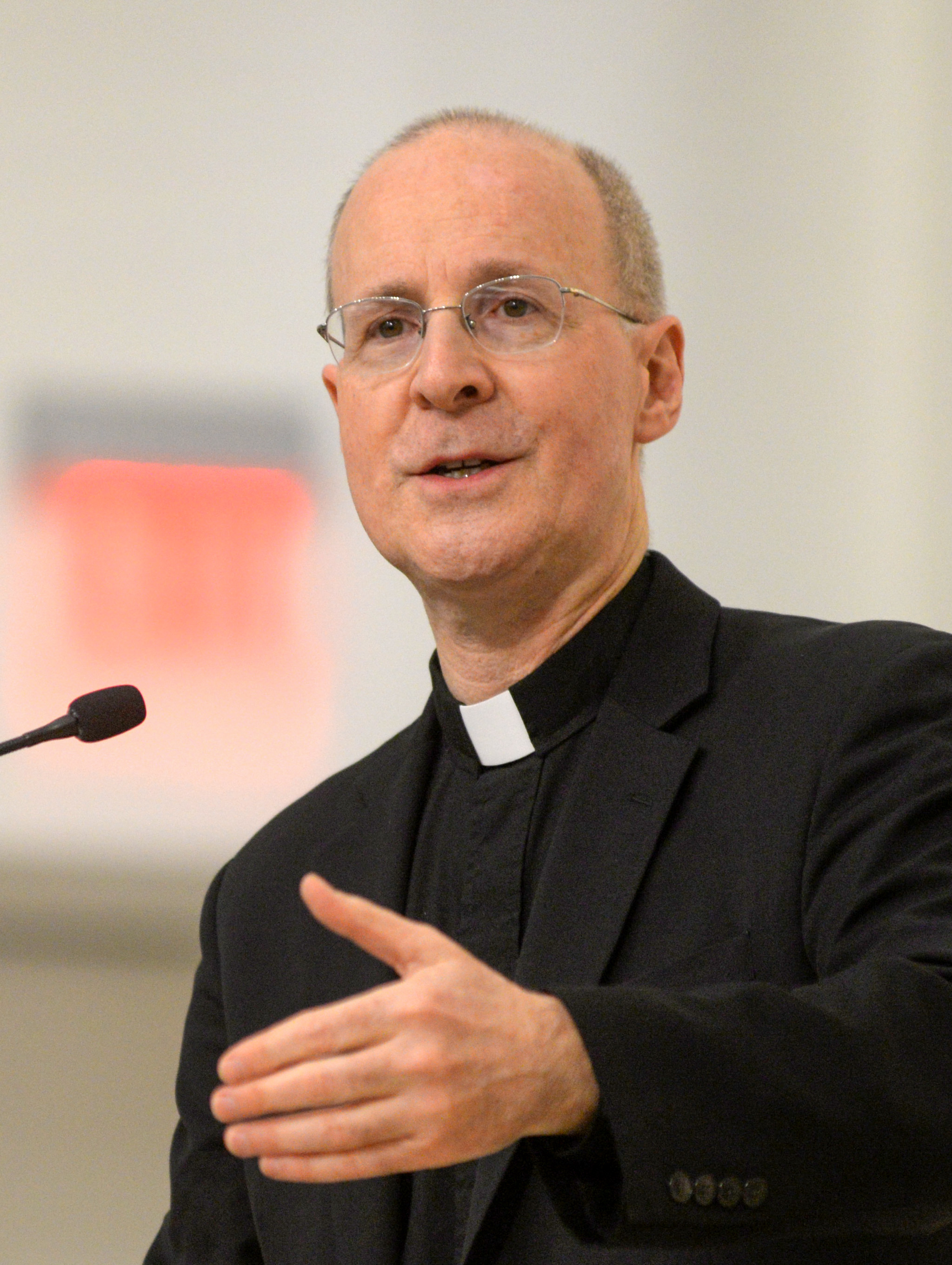
James J. Martin in 2019

On 12 April 2017, Francis appointed James J. Martin as a consultant to the Holy See's Dicastery for Communication. Martin is a Jesuit priest and editor-at-large of America, widely known for his pastoral outreach to LGBTQ Catholics, which has attracted controversy among Catholics.

On 30 September 2019, Francis met Martin in a thirty-minute audience in the Apostolic Palace's papal library; Martin said that they discussed his ministry to LGBTQ people. In a letter in July 2021, Francis praised Martin as "a priest for everyone, as God is the Father of everyone", and sent his prayers for Martin's ministry and followers. Martin and Francis met again in a private audience on 11 November 2022. On 6 May 2023, Francis sent a letter to Martin thanking him for "all the good you are doing", and sending his "best regards to the members of the meeting at Fordham University" of Outreach, a Catholic LGBTQ organisation founded by Martin. On 7 July 2023, it was announced that Martin was among the people specifically invited by Francis to take part in the final phase meetings of the Synod on Synodality.

==== Other ====
As Archbishop of Buenos Aires, Bergoglio met Marcelo Marquez, an Argentine gay rights activist and former professor at a Catholic seminary, who had written to Bergoglio in response to his opposition to same-sex marriage. According to Marquez, Bergoglio said that he was "in favour of gay rights and in any case, I also favour civil unions for homosexuals".

On 2 July 2017, Francis reportedly called James Alison, a suspended English Catholic priest and gay theologian known for his work on LGBTQ issues. In the telephone call, Francis twice said that he was giving Alison the power of the keys, understood to enable Alison to hear confessions anywhere in the world.

In August 2020, Francis sent his prayers to Mónica Astorga Cremona, an Argentine Carmelite nun, and the transgender women for which she opened a building complex in Neuquén. In the letter, Francis wrote that God would "repay you abundantly". Bergoglio first met Cremona in 2009, when he was Archbishop of Buenos Aires, and they are believed to have maintained regular correspondence. Writing in the Toronto Star, columnist Michael Coren described Francis' support as "monumental" and "far more significant than it may seem because the Roman Catholic Church has often been loud and active in opposing the very notion of the trans reality".

=== Meeting with Kim Davis ===
On 24 September 2015, during his visit to the United States, Francis held a private meeting with Kim Davis, a county clerk from Kentucky, at Washington D.C.'s Vatican Embassy. The meeting lasted ten to fifteen minutes. Davis had gained international attention after she defied a federal court order to issue marriage licences to same-sex couples, leading to a six-day imprisonment. Speaking to ABC News, Davis said that "the Pope is on track with what we're doing, and agreeing". On the flight returning to Rome, asked about government officials refusing to comply with local laws on marriage licences, Francis told reporters that conscientious objection was a human right.

On 2 October 2015, Federico Lombardi of the Holy See Press Office confirmed that Francis and Davis had indeed met, but emphasised that Francis "did not enter into details [sic] of [Davis'] situation ... and his meeting with her should not be considered a form of support of her position." According to Lombardi, "[t]he only real audience granted by the pope" had been with "one of his former students and his family".

Earlier, the Pope had met his personal friend Yayo Grassi, whom Francis had taught at a high school in Santa Fe between 1964 and 1965. Francis hugged Grassi and Grassi's boyfriend of 19 years, whom Francis had previously met in Rome. Grassi expressed to CNN his disdain of media coverage of Francis' meeting with Davis.

Lombardi stated that "[s]uch brief greetings" such as those with Kim Davis "occur on all papal visits and are due to the Pope's characteristic kindness and availability."

== See also ==
- Catholic Church and homosexuality
- Christianity and transgender people
- In the Closet of the Vatican – a 2019 book by Frédéric Martel discussing gay clergy in the Vatican
- Krzysztof Charamsa – priest and theologian, who was suspended from his positions in the Roman Curia after announcing that he was in a gay relationship in October 2015
- Laurent Stefanini – French diplomat whose appointment as Ambassador of France to the Holy See was refused by the Holy See in 2015, which some sources have speculatively attributed to his homosexuality
- Male and Female He Created Them – a 2019 document from the Congregation for Catholic Education instructing Catholic schools on topics regarding gender identity.
- Third Extraordinary General Assembly of the Synod of Bishops – an October 2014 synod on the family in which a paragraph entitled Pastoral Attention towards Persons with Homosexual Tendencies narrowly failed to attain the two-thirds majority support for its inclusion in the synod's final report
