= Children in the Fire =

2025 documentary film

- Film Poster
- Directed by: Evgeny Afineevsky
- Written by: Evgeny Afineevsky
- Produced by: Evgeny Afineevsky; Galyna Sadomtseva-Nabaranchuk; Kevin Goetz
- Release date: 2025
- Running time: 108 minutes
- Countries: United States; Ukraine
- Language: Ukrainian

Children in the Fire is a 2025 documentary film directed by Evgeny Afineevsky about Ukrainian children affected by Russia's invasion of Ukraine. The film combines live-action footage with animated recreations and diary-style elements to present the experiences of young survivors.

== Synopsis ==
The film follows multiple Ukrainian children and teenagers whose lives were changed by the war, including experiences of displacement, injury, and alleged abduction, and depicts their efforts to pursue education, athletics, performance, and civic aspirations amid ongoing conflict.

== Production ==
According to festival and event materials, Afineevsky traveled to Ukraine to document the lives of children affected by the invasion and used animation alongside live footage to depict lived and remembered experiences. Monte-Carlo Television Festival materials credit the production to Unbroken Generation Production, Karandash Animation Studio, and PFX (Postproduction and Visual Effects Studio) as a Ukraine–United States co-production.

== Release ==
The film screened at the 2025 Raindance Film Festival in London and was listed as nominated for Best Documentary Feature, with scheduled festival showings in June 2025. In the United States, the film had a North American premiere at the Mill Valley Film Festival on 11 October 2025. In Ukraine, Interfax-Ukraine reported a gala screening in October 2025 connected to the Odesa International Film Festival. Additional public screenings with filmmaker Q&As were held at venues including the Wende Museum (October 2025). KPBS listed a January 2026 screening and Q&A event in Carlsbad, California. AwardsWatch included the film in its coverage of the 48th Mill Valley Film Festival lineup announcement in September 2025.

In February 2025, Deadline published an interview feature on the documentary and its focus on the war's impact on Ukrainian children.

== Reception ==
=== Critical response ===
A U.S. outlet review covering the film's Mill Valley screening described the documentary as emotionally intense and noted Afineevsky's post-screening discussion with the audience.

=== Accolades ===
At the 64th Monte-Carlo Television Festival (2025), Children in the Fire received the AMADE Prize and was also listed as the Jury Special Prize winner in the News & Documentaries category on the festival's laureates page. Monaco Mediax (festival organizer) likewise reported the AMADE Prize award to the film. Trade and festival-coverage outlets also reported the AMADE Prize recognition for the film in 2025.

Award	Date of ceremony	Category	Recipient(s)	Result	Ref.
Cinema for Peace Awards	16 February 2026	Cinema for Peace Dove for The Most Valuable Documentary of the Year	Children in the Fire	Pending	

== See also ==
- Winter on Fire: Ukraine's Fight for Freedom
