= Freedom on Fire: Ukraine's Fight for Freedom =

2022 Evgeny Afineevsky documentary

Freedom on Fire: Ukraine’s Fight for Freedom
- Directed by: Evgeny Afineevsky
- Produced by: Galyna Sadomtseva-Nabaranchuk; Inna Goncharova; Shahida Tulaganova; Evgeny Afineevsky; Will Znidaric; Ted Hope
- Cinematography: Evgeny Afineevsky
- Edited by: Will Znidaric
- Music by: Jasha Klebe
- Distributed by: Diamond Docs; Donbas Frontliner; Donetsk Institute of Information; Makemake; Winter on Fire Production
- Release date: 2022
- Running time: 116 min
- Countries: Ukraine, UK, USA
- Languages: Ukrainian; English; Russian

Freedom on Fire: Ukraine's Fight for Freedom (Ukrainian: «Свобода у вогні: Боротьба України за свободу», romanized: Svoboda u vohni: borotba Ukrainy za svobodu, Russian: «Свобода в огне: борьба Украины за свободу», romanized: Svoboda v ognye: borba Ukrainy za svobodu) is a 2022 Ukrainian-British-American documentary film written and directed by Evgeny Afineevsky. It premiered out of competition at the 79th edition of the Venice Film Festival.

== Plot ==
The film chronicles the early stages of the 2022 Russian invasion of Ukraine, from the point of view of Ukrainian ordinary citizens.

== Release ==
The film had its world premiere at the 79th Venice International Film Festival. It was later screened at various festivals, including the 47th Toronto Film Festival, Hamptons International Film Festival, Mill Valley Film Festival, Seattle International Film Festival DocFest (USA), SCAD Savannah Film Festival(USA), DOCNYC, Ji.hlava International Documentary Film Festival, the Tokyo International Film Festival, the Seattle International Film Festival, the Stockholm International Film Festival. Budapest International Documentary Festival (Hungary), Festival Internacional de Cinema Independente de Braga - Bragacine (Portugal), Movies on War Film Festival (Norway), Eastern Neighbors Film Festival (Netherlands), Cinema for Peace Awards (Germany), Ukraina Festiwal Filmowy (Poland), The Dublin International Film Festival (Ireland), Human Rights Watch Film Festival(Canada), Cleveland International Film Festival, The Martha’s Vineyard Film Festival (USA), International Festival of Historical Films "Beyond Time" (Ukraine / Kyiv), European Film Festival of Atlanta (USA).

== Reception ==
The film was generally praised by critics. Screen International critic Jonathan Romney described it as "a film that deserves to be widely seen, and as soon as possible". According to Los Angeles Times critic Robert Abele, the film is a "pulsating jumble of hearts and minds making do amid war and wreckage". According to TheWrap review, "the film is less a catalogue of horrors than a tribute to the people who look for strength despite those horrors; it continually finds moments of grace, humanity and even beauty that seem almost unfathomable in these circumstances."

== 2023 version ==
In February 2023, Afineevsky and his Ukrainian team presented a newly edited and updated comprehensive version of the movie, outlining all nine years of the war (2014–2023) and one full year of the full-scale invasion (February 2022 – February 2023). The new version had a lot of new and unseen footage and new interviews. This new director's cut was executive produced by Robert Fyvolent.

Despite the raging war in Ukraine, on February 22, 2023, Ukraine's Ministry of Culture and Information Policy and its minister Oleksandr Tkachenko, together with Ministry of Foreign Affairs of Ukraine and 1+1 Media, hosted the world premiere of the newly-created movie in the heart of the Ukraine's capital Kyiv. Two days later, on February 24, 2023, Pope Francis and Afineevsky hosted the European premiere of the new version of the film in Vatican City.

== See also ==
- Winter on Fire: Ukraine's Fight for Freedom
