= James J. Martin (priest) =

American Jesuit priest and writer (born 1960)

The Reverend James Martin SJ
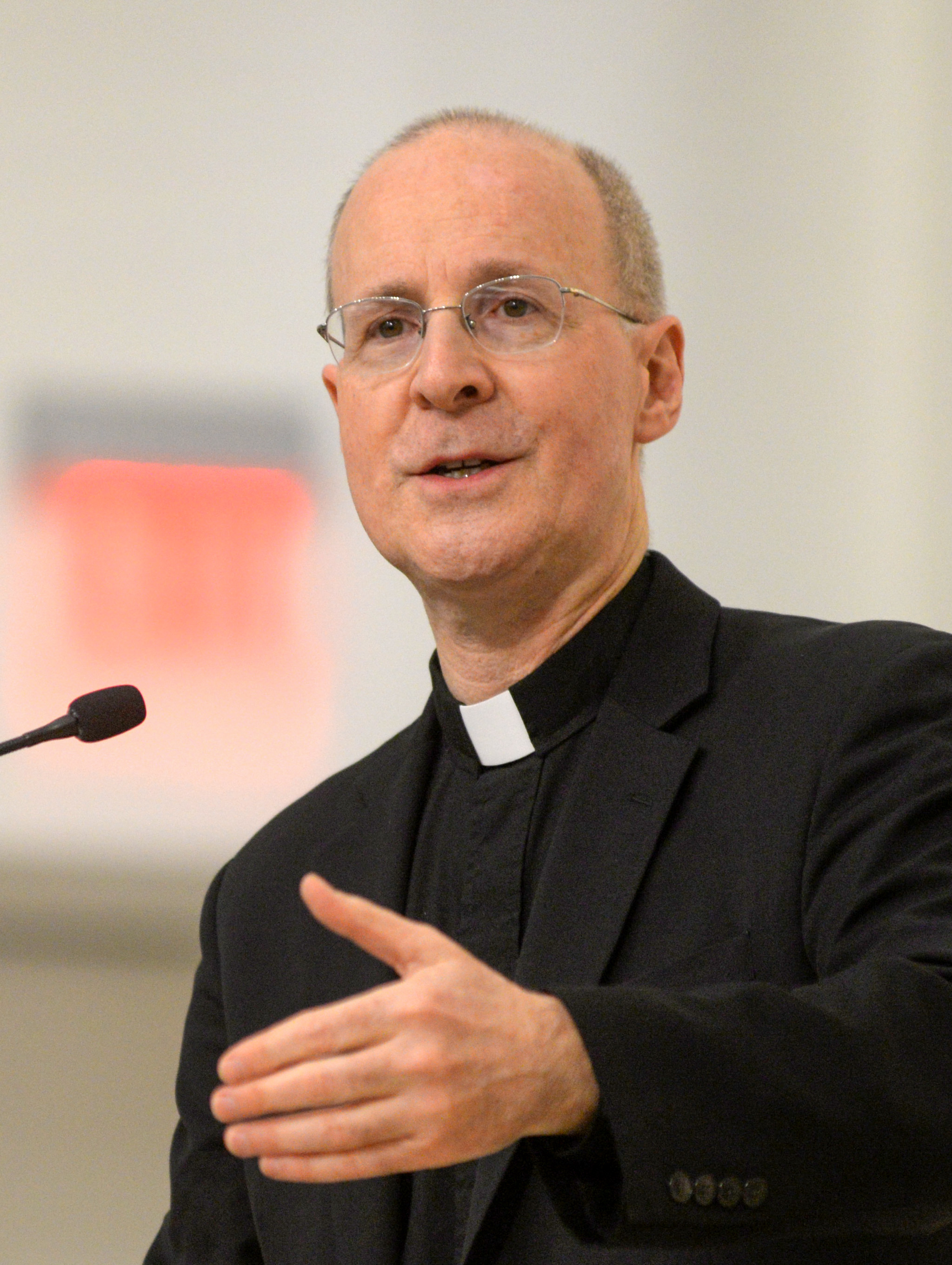
- Martin in 2019
- Church: Latin Church

Orders
- Ordination: June 12, 1999 by Lawrence Aloysius Burke

Personal details
- Born: December 29, 1960 (age 65) Plymouth Meeting, Pennsylvania, U.S.
- Denomination: Catholic
- Occupation: Jesuit priest, author
- Education: University of Pennsylvania (BS); Loyola University Chicago (MA); Weston Jesuit School of Theology (MDiv, ThM)

James Joseph Martin Jr. (born December 29, 1960) is an American Jesuit priest, writer, editor-at-large of America magazine, and the founder of Outreach.

Pope Francis appointed Martin as a consultant to the Secretariat for Communications at the Vatican in 2017. In July 2023, it was announced that Martin was among the people specifically invited by Francis to take part in the final phase meetings of the Synod on Synodality.

A New York Times Best-Selling author, Martin's books include The Jesuit Guide to (Almost) Everything: A Spirituality for Real Life, Jesus: A Pilgrimage, and My Life with the Saints. He is a public speaker on Ignatian spirituality as inspired by Ignatius of Loyola.

Martin's public outreach to the LGBTQ+ community has drawn both support and criticism from within the Catholic Church.

== Early life ==
Martin was born on December 29, 1960 in Plymouth Meeting, Pennsylvania. Although he was raised Catholic, he attended public schools and graduated Plymouth-Whitemarsh High School in 1978.

He enrolled as an at the University of Pennsylvania's Wharton School of Business receiving his bachelors decree in economics in 1982. From there, Martin was employed at General Electric in New York City and later at GE Capital in Stamford, Connecticut.

== Religious life ==
Martin's corporate career changed after viewing a documentary on the life of Trappist monk Thomas Merton. At the recommendation of a priest, Martin consulted to some religious men at Fairfield University. Around 1987 Martin started getting "more and more miserable" and felt "trapped".

It took two years for Martin to act on joining religious life. Starting his two-year novitiate in the Jesuits' New England Province in Boston, August 1988; Martin worked in various settings, including a hospital for the seriously ill in Cambridge, Massachusetts, a hospice for the sick and dying with Mother Teresa's Missionaries of Charity, an orphanage in Kingston, Jamaica, a Boston homeless shelter, and the Nativity Mission School, a Jesuit school for inner-city youth, in New York City.

After pronouncing his First Vows in 1990, Martin was sent to study philosophy at Loyola University Chicago. During this time he spent two years working in an outreach program for street-gang members in Chicago's housing projects, and with the homeless at a community center. In 1992, he earned an M.A. in philosophy from Loyola University Chicago.

From 1992 to 1994, for his "regency" assignment, Martin spent two years working with the Jesuit Refugee Service/East Africa in Nairobi, Kenya. During this time, he assisted East African refugees in starting small businesses and co-founded a refugee handicraft shop called The Mikono Centre, which is still operational as of 2026. He then returned to New York City to work as an associate editor at America magazine in New York City for one year.

After returning to the United States, he studied at the Weston Jesuit School of Theology and received a M.Div. in 1998. Later that year he was ordained a transitional deacon. The following year, on June 12, 1999, Martin was ordained to the priesthood and pronounced his Final Vows as a Jesuit on November 1, 2009.

== Career ==
Fr. Martin SJ in his NYC office on November 4, 2024

Since his ordination, Martin has written or edited more than a dozen books on religious and spiritual topics. He is a frequent commentator for CNN, NPR, Fox News Channel, Time magazine, The Huffington Post, and other news outlets, and has written several op-ed pieces and blogged for The New York Times, and is the editor-at-large of America magazine.

As of October 2021, Martin serves on the Board of Directors of Georgetown University.

=== Pilgrimages ===
At the recommendation of Drew Christiansen SJ, the then editor of America, Martin undertook a pilgrimage to the Holy Land, which he then chronicled in his book Jesus: A Pilgrimage. The book quickly became a New York Times bestseller and Christopher Award winner, and received positive reviews from a number of public figures including author Scott Hahn, Cardinal Timothy M. Dolan, and the Anglican Archbishop Desmond Tutu. Beginning in 2015, Martin has led a number of pilgrimages to the Holy Land with America Media, inspired by the book and visiting many of the religious sites described therein.

=== Television appearances ===
On September 13, 2007, Martin appeared on Comedy Central's The Colbert Report to discuss Mother Teresa's fifty-year sense of abandonment by God which had much coverage in the media at the time. Martin appeared several more times on The Colbert Report, once to discuss Pope Benedict XVI's visit to the U.S. in April 2008, and again on February 23, 2009, to discuss how poverty (or, at least, reducing the importance one places on material goods) can bring one closer to God.

On March 18, 2010, Martin was invited to the program in the wake of Glenn Beck's suggestion that Catholics run away from priests who preach "social justice". Martin said that "social justice addresses the things that keep people poor" and "asks you why are these people poor." He added that "Christ asked us to work with the poor. ... In the Gospel of Matthew He says that the way that we're going to be judged at the end of our lives is not what church we prayed in or how we prayed but really ... how we treated the poor." On August 10, 2011, Martin appeared on The Colbert Report to discuss God's "approval rating" and to promote his book The Jesuit Guide to (Almost) Everything: A Spirituality for Real Life. On November 9, 2011, he appeared once again to promote his book concerning humor and religion, Between Heaven and Mirth. On February 11, 2013, he went on the show to discuss the resignation of Pope Benedict XVI. On September 24, 2013, he was on the show, talking about an interview where Pope Francis said that love, compassion, and mercy are more important than the rules (within a subtext of Pope Francis washing the feet of criminals, wanting a more prominent role for women, saying atheists can be redeemed, not judging gays and lesbians, and that we cannot serve money and God at the same time), and introducing Metallica. On September 24, 2013, he appeared to discuss income inequality and the Pope's emphasis on economic justice and on the importance of caring for the poor.

=== Other activities ===
Martin is a member of the LAByrinth Theater Company. His involvement with the 2005 stage production of The Last Days of Judas Iscariot, written by Stephen Adly Guirgis, directed by Philip Seymour Hoffman, and featuring Sam Rockwell, John Ortiz, Eric Bogosian, and Callie Thorne, is the subject of Martin's book A Jesuit Off-Broadway: Center Stage with Jesus, Judas, and Life's Big Questions (Loyola Press, 2007). Publishers Weekly gave the book a starred review. Martin appeared as a priest, performing two baptisms, in Martin Scorsese's 2019 crime film The Irishman.

The Democratic National Convention asked Martin to deliver a closing prayer at their 2020 convention.

== Building a Bridge (2017) and LGBTQ+ ministry ==
Following the 2016 Orlando nightclub shooting, Martin stated that he was "disappointed that more Catholic leaders did not offer support to the LGBT community" in the aftermath of the shooting, and started a series of lectures on how the Church could better minister to LGBT Catholics, which led to his book, Building a Bridge (2017).

In 2020, Martin addressed the Association of Catholic Colleges and Universities (ACCU), with over three-fourths of the Associations' school presidents in attendance, urging them to take steps to promote inclusion. Rev. Dennis H. Holtschneider, president of the ACCU, remarked that Martin was warmly received by "a new generation of Catholic college presidents" who reflect "the influence of Pope Francis". J.D. Flynn, editor-in-chief of EWTN-owned Catholic News Agency, contended that Martin presented in his address a "vision of the human person at odds with Catholic teaching". Flynn wrote that "every initiative" recommended by Martin, such as "Lavender graduation" or "L.G.B.T spiritualities, theologies, liturgies and safe spaces", was designed "to affirm the lie that sexual inclination or orientation is, in itself, identity".

In December 2023, when Pope Francis published the declaration Fiducia supplicans, that allowed priests to give non-liturgical blessings to same-sex couples, Martin, described the declaration as "a major step forward in the church's ministry to LGBTQ people" and demonstrated the church affirming same-sex couples' desire "for God's presence and help in their committed and loving relationships". The next day, he blessed the individuals of a same-sex union who had married at Judson Memorial Church, described by the individuals as a "progressive Protestant community".

In 2021, a documentary film about Martin's LGBT ministry, also called Building a Bridge, directed by Evan Mascagni and Shannon Post and with Martin Scorsese as executive producer, premiered at the Tribeca Film Festival in New York City.

Martin's book, Building a Bridge (2017), was praised by several prelates, including Cardinals Robert McElroy, Kevin Farrell and Joseph Tobin. Tobin wrote that "in too many parts of our Church LGBT people have been made to feel unwelcome, excluded, and even shamed. Father Martin's brave, prophetic, and inspiring new book marks an essential step in inviting Church leaders to minister with more compassion, and in reminding LGBT Catholics that they are as much a part of our Church as any other Catholic." However, Martin's book also received criticism from some Catholics who successfully lobbied for many of his lectures at Catholic venues to be cancelled. In a critique of the book, Cardinal Robert Sarah described Martin as "one of the most outspoken critics of the Church's message with regard to sexuality". Martin himself lauded Sarah's column as "a step forward", since Sarah used the term "'L.G.B.T.', which a few traditionalist Catholics reject", rather than "persons with same-sex attraction" and other antiquated phrases.

In a 2018 column, Martin wrote that he has never challenged the Church's teaching on homosexuality and never will. A few months later, Robert George, founder of the Witherspoon Institute, First Things contributor and co-author of What Is Marriage? Man and Woman: A Defense, argued that Catholics should accept that Martin does believe in the Church's teaching on homosexuality. In the same year, David Henderson on Witherspoon Institute's journal and Dan Hitchens on First Things each stressed that Martin had not "affirm[ed]" the teaching "as true". Also in 2018, Cardinal Raymond Burke stated that Martin has "an 'open' [sic] and wrong position on homosexuality", and that he "is not coherent with the Church's teaching on homosexuality". Journalist Frank Bruni said in The New York Times in 2018 that Martin did not "explicitly reject Church teaching" but rather questioned the language in the Catechism of the Catholic Church that describes homosexual attraction as "intrinsically disordered".

In September 2019, Archbishop Charles Chaput of Philadelphia, who had criticized Building a Bridge several times in 2017, (Note: Archbishop Chaput has also described many of the attacks against Martin as "bitterness" that is "unjust and unwarranted," while still calling for "serious, legitimate criticism" of the book's "perceived ambiguities" and inadequacies.) (Note: Chaput argued that dealing with the substantive issues frankly "is the only way an honest discussion can be had.") criticised Martin again. (Note: He stated that "due to the confusion caused by his statements and activities regarding same-sex related (LGBT) issues, I find it necessary to emphasize that Father Martin does not speak with authority on behalf of the Church, and to caution the faithful about some of his statements.") He described "bitter personal attacks" made against Martin as "inexcusable and unChristian [sic]." While stating that many of Martin's efforts to "accompany and support people with same-sex attraction and gender dysphoria" have "been laudable", Chaput also criticized Martin for "a pattern of ambiguity in his teachings," and for, allegedly, asking the Church to "modif[y]" its teaching that same-sex attraction is "objectively disordered." Martin replied that same-sex relations and same-sex marriage "are both impermissible (and immoral) under Church teaching," and that the reason he does not focus on this "is that LGBT Catholics have heard this repeatedly." Bishop Thomas Paprocki and Bishop Richard Stika supported Chaput's column. Paprocki argued that Martin "correctly expresses God's love for all people, while on the other, he either encourages or fails to correct behavior that separates a person from that very love. This is deeply scandalous in the sense of leading people to believe that wrongful behavior is not sinful."

== Relationship with the Holy See ==
In 2017, Pope Francis appointed Martin as a consultant to the Vatican's Dicastery for Communication.

On August 23, 2018, Martin delivered an address at the Vatican's World Meeting of Families in Dublin, Ireland. His talk focused on how Catholics can more effectively engage with LGBT members of their communities, using biblical examples of Jesus interacting with the Samaritan woman and Zacchaeus to illustrate the call to inclusive community.

The next year, Martin was received by Pope Francis in a private audience in the papal library of the Vatican's Apostolic Palace.

In June 2021, Martin received a handwritten letter in which Pope Francis praised Martin, writing how, "Thinking about your pastoral work, I see that you are continually seeking to imitate this style of God".

Martin sent three questions to the Pope about the relation of the LGBT community with the Church in May 2022. The Pope answered the three questions.

Outreach: What do you say to an LGBT Catholic who has experienced rejection from the Church? Pope Francis: I would have them recognize it not as "the rejection of the church," but instead of "people in the church." The church is a mother and calls together all her children. Take for example the parable of those invited to the feast: "the just, the sinners, the rich and the poor, etc." [Matthew 22:1-15; Luke 14:15-24]. A "selective" church, one of "pure blood," is not Holy Mother Church, but rather a sect.

Martin participated in the July 2022 Outreach LGBTQ Catholic Ministry Conference held at Fordham University, a conference dedicated to outreach and dialogue with LGBTQ Catholics. Martin wrote a letter to Pope Francis informing him of the outcome of the conference. In July 2022 Pope Francis issued a letter in response encouraging Catholics to foster a "culture of encounter" that "shortens distances and enriches us with differences, in the same manner as Jesus, who made himself close to everyone." The Pope also assured Father Martin of his prayers, and invoked the blessing of Jesus upon him and the protection of the Blessed Virgin.

In July 2023, it was announced that Martin was among the people specifically invited by Francis to take part in the final phase meetings of the Synod on Synodality.

Two years later, Martin was received by Pope Leo XIV in a private audience in the papal library of the Vatican's Apostolic Palace. Following the meeting, Martin wrote an article in which he said the new pontiff "wanted to continue with the same approach [towards LGBTQ ministry] that Pope Francis had advanced, which was one of openness and welcome."

== Views ==
=== Anti-Catholicism in the media ===
Martin has written about anti-Catholicism in the entertainment industry. In 2000, he argued that, despite a "continuing fascination" with the Catholic Church, "paradoxically, the entertainment industry is where one finds the most obvious contempt for the Catholic Church. It is as if producers, directors, playwrights and filmmakers feel obliged to establish their intellectual bona fides by trumpeting their differences with the institution that holds them in such thrall."

In a 2021 interview, Martin said, "Even small things, like a New York Times review, contribute to an atmosphere where Catholicism is seen as silly, and I think that makes it more difficult for people to have conversations about faith overall." Martin remarked that anti-Catholic perceptions on minor matters are "intimately connected" to matters in the "public square" related to Catholicism "consequential to people's lives":

Debate about difficult topics related to religion has to be accompanied by respect. You might want to talk about birth control, abortion, or religious liberty, but do it respectfully. If you are swimming in this culture of disrespect—of mocking and belittling - that makes it harder for people to even know how to approach these topics.

On Big Think, Martin commented in 2012:

On the one hand are people who say that anti-Catholicism is just as bad and anti-Semitism or homophobia or racism. It's not clearly. It's not as virile and not as prevalent. On the other hand are people that say it doesn't exist at all, but it does [exist] basically. I think a lot of portrayals of nuns and priests on TV and in the movies are stereotypical. [...] when you see a priest show up on a TV cop show you know he's usually a pedophile. Nuns are usually portrayed as like ninnies basically or stupid. I mean I would say here are women who kind of built the Catholic healthcare system in the United States and ran universities and but when they come on TV they're portrayed as being idiots [...] [Y]ou hear people taking potshots at priests for being celibate or being pedophiles or being insane or whatever [...] if you portrayed a rabbi or an Imam like that people would rightfully complain, but in a way I think because we live in a largely Protestant culture [and] I think because of the sex abuse crisis and [...] some suspicion about the Vatican and Catholic theology in a sense, anti-Catholicism [has been accepted in America].

=== Denial of Communion to politicians ===
In 2019, Martin criticized the public denials of Holy Communion to several politicians, including Joe Biden, based on their support for abortion, and to a woman who had contracted a same-sex civil marriage in the Diocese of Grand Rapids. Martin wrote in a tweet that denying Communion to politicians was a "bad idea" because in this case one "must also deny it to those who support the death penalty".

Martin received criticism for his interpretation of canon 915 which forbids the administration of Holy Communion to those who persist in manifest grave sin. Regarding same-sex marriage as public grave sin, Martin asserted that there were "many other examples of public acts well known among parish communities."

=== Other ===
Christian Post and Lifesitenews stated that Martin attracted further controversy in March 2021, after he posted a tweet on a reflection from the director of a campus ministry at St. Martin de Porres High School, that referred to God as "her" and suggested that using female imagery as a representation of God is "theologically correct."

== Awards ==
Martin's book My Life with the Saints (2006) was the winner of a 2007 Christopher Award. Martin has also received honorary degrees from the following institutions:

- 2007: Doctor of Divinity, Wagner College
- 2010: Doctor of Humane Letters, Wheeling Jesuit University
- 2010: Doctor of Humane Letters, Sacred Heart University
- 2011: Doctor of Humane Letters, Le Moyne College
- 2012: Doctor of Humane Letters, Saint Joseph's University
- 2012: Doctor of Humane Letters, Saint Louis University
- 2012: Doctor of Humane Letters, Immaculata University
- 2013: Doctor of Humane Letters, Saint Peter's University
- 2014: Doctor of Letters, Marquette University
- 2015: Doctor of Divinity, Regis College
- 2015: Doctor of Humane Letters, Fairfield University
- 2015: Doctor of Religion and Culture, Santa Clara University
- 2016: Doctor of Humane Letters, Canisius College
- 2016: Doctor of Letters, Gonzaga University
- 2016: Doctor of Humane Letters, Creighton University
- 2017: Doctor of Humane Letters, Loyola University Maryland
- 2017: Doctor of Humane Letters, University of Scranton
- 2017: Doctor of Humane Letters, Misericordia University
- 2018: Doctor of Humane Letters, Spring Hill College
- 2018: Doctor of Humane Letters, Loyola University New Orleans
- 2019: Doctor of Humane Letters, Seattle University
- 2020: Doctor of Humane Letters, Fordham University

== Publications ==
=== Books authored ===
- This Our Exile: A Spiritual Journey with the Refugees of East Africa (Orbis Books, 1999)
- In Good Company: The Fast Track from the Corporate World to Poverty, Chastity and Obedience (Sheed & Ward, 2000)
- Searching for God at Ground Zero (Sheed & Ward, 2002)
- Becoming Who You Are: Insights on the True Self from Thomas Merton and Other Saints (Paulist Press, 2006)
- My Life with the Saints (Loyola Press, 2006)
- Lourdes Diary: Seven Days at the Grotto of Massabieille (Loyola Press, 2006)
- A Jesuit Off-Broadway: Center Stage with Jesus, Judas, and Life's Big Questions (Loyola Press, 2007)
- The Jesuit Guide to (Almost) Everything: A Spirituality for Real Life (HarperOne, 2010)
- Between Heaven and Mirth: Why Joy, Humor, and Laughter Are at the Heart of the Spiritual Life (HarperOne 2011)
- Jesus: A Pilgrimage (HarperOne, 2014)
- Seven Last Words: An Invitation to a Deeper Friendship with Jesus (HarperOne, 2016)
- The Abbey: A Story of Discovery (HarperOne, 2016), a novel
- Building a Bridge: How the Catholic Church and the LGBT Community Can Enter into a Relationship of Respect, Compassion, and Sensitivity (HarperOne, 2017)
- Learning to Pray: A Guide for Everyone (HarperOne, 2021)
- Come Forth: The Promise of Jesus's Greatest Miracle (HarperOne, 2023) (with the preface of Pope Francis to the Italian edition)
- Work in Progress: Confessions of a busboy, dishwasher, caddy, usher, factory worker, bank teller, corporate tool, and priest (HarperOne, 2026)

=== Books edited ===
- How Can I Find God? The Famous and Not-So-Famous Consider the Quintessential Question (Triumph Books, 1997)
- Professions of Faith: Living and Working as a Catholic (with Jeremy Langford) (Sheed & Ward, 2002)
- Awake My Soul: Contemporary Catholics on Traditional Devotions (Loyola Press, 2004)
- Celebrating Good Liturgy: A Guide to the Ministries of the Mass (Loyola Press, 2005)

== See also ==
- Pope Francis and LGBT topics
