= Oy Vey! My Son Is Gay!! =

- Official poster
- Directed by: Evgeny Afineevsky
- Written by: Joseph Goldman; Martin Guigui
- Produced by: Evgeny Afineevsky; Svetlana Anufrieva; Rich Cowan; Igor Zektser; Alexei Diveyeff-Tserkovny
- Starring: Lainie Kazan; Saul Rubinek; Vincent Pastore; John Lloyd Young; Jai Rodriguez; Bruce Vilanch; Carmen Electra; Fred Swink
- Cinematography: Peter N. Green
- Edited by: Michael Southworth
- Music by: Lilo Fedida; Eddie Grimberg
- Production companies: New Generation Films; North by Northwest Entertainment; Oy Vey My Son Is Gay Productions
- Distributed by: New Generation Films; Turtles Crossing
- Release dates: August 29, 2009 (Montreal World Film Festival); December 24, 2010 (United States)
- Running time: 91 minutes
- Country: United States
- Language: English
- Box office: $89,507 (US)

Oy Vey! My Son Is Gay!! is a 2009 comedy film directed, co-written, and produced by Evgeny Afineevsky and starring Lainie Kazan, Saul Rubinek, Vincent Pastore, John Lloyd Young, Jai Rodriguez, Bruce Vilanch, Fred Swink and Carmen Electra. The theme song, "The Word Is Love" was written by Desmond Child and performed by Lulu. "The Word is Love" was contending for nominations in the Original Song category for the 82nd Academy Awards.

The film concerns an interfaith relationship. An adult Jewish man comes out to his parents as gay. They try to come to terms to it, but are displeased that their son's boyfriend is not Jewish.

== Plot ==
Twenty-five year old real estate agent Nelson Hirsch is having problems telling his overbearing Jewish parents—Martin and Shirley Hirsch—that he is gay, let alone in a loving relationship, not only with a man, Angelo Ferraro, but a non-Jewish one. However, he and Angelo have made a time sensitive pact to tell their respective parents about their relationship. It becomes even more complicated as, out of circumstance, Nelson discovers that his mother—and thus by association his father—believe the new significant other in his life is not Angelo, who they assume is solely his decorator, but rather Nelson and Angelo's neighbor, Playpen Playmate of the month, Sybil Williams. That complication is exacerbated by the fact that his mom will only hear and see what she wants to, which in this situation is coming to terms with Nelson being in love with a shiksa who takes her clothes off in public.

When Nelson is finally able to tell his parents the truth, Martin and Shirley (who have their own slightly different preconceived notions about homosexuality), have to find a way to come to terms with it. The couple are concerned about how their friends and relatives will react; they are especially concerned about Martin's macho employer, his Uncle Moisha, and Shirley's brother and sister-in-law, Max and Sophie.

It is difficult relating to Angelo's Italian parents, Carmine and Terry Ferraro, who have their own issues in dealing with Angelo and Nelson's relationship. Nelson and Angelo's time-sensitive issue advances their relationship to the next level, with the potential to turn the world of this collective group further on its head.

== Cast ==
- Lainie Kazan as Shirley Hirsch
- Saul Rubinek as Martin Hirsch
- Vincent Pastore as Carmine Ferraro
- John Lloyd Young as Nelson Hirsch
- Jai Rodriguez as Angelo Ferraro
- Bruce Vilanch as Uncle Max
- Carmen Electra as Sybil Williams
- Shelly Burch as Teresa Ferraro
- Stanislav 'Slava' Medvedenko as Russian Host (credited as Slava Medvedenko)
- Alexandra Mamaliger as Andrea Hirsch (credited as Alex Mamaliger)
- Eddie Levi Lee as Moisha
- Kyle Deluca as Anthony Ferraro
- Heiko Obermöller as Nudelman

== Awards ==
- Official Selection 26th annual Boston LGBT Film Fest 2010
- Charlotte Gay & Lesbian Film Festival 2010
  - Festival Special Award
- Official Selection Filmfest Hamburg 2010
- FilmOut 2010
  - Best Actress in a Feature Film – Lainie Kazan
  - Best Direction – Evgeny Afineevsky
  - Best Narrative Feature - Evgeny Afineevsky / Svetlana Anufrieva
  - Best Actor in a Supporting Role – Saul Rubinek
  - Freedom Award – Ensemble Cast in a Feature Film
- Fire Island Pines International Film Festival 2009
  - Spotlight Award - Evgeny Afineevsky
- Fort Worth Gay and Lesbian International Film Festival 2010
  - Rising Star Award – Evgeny Afineevsky
- 13 Annual Jewish Film Festival In Miami 2010
  - Audience Award for Best Feature Film
- LesGaiCineMad – Madrid International LGTB Film Festival 2010
  - Special PUBLICO Award LesGaiCineFamilia (Special Audience Award LesGaiCineFamilia)
- 24th Festival Mix Milano 2010
  - Premio speciale del pubblico (The Audience Award)
- Monaco Charity Film Festival 2008
  - Award for Best Original Comedy Screenplay - Evgeny Afineevsky
- Official Selection Montreal World Film Festival 2009
- Official Selection 32 Moscow International Film Festival
- New York International Independent Film & Video Festival 2009
  - Best Ensemble Cast in a Feature Film Award
  - Audience Award for Best Feature Film
- 6th Philadelphia QFEST 2010
  - Audience Award winner - Best Comedic Feature
- Official Selection 28th Reeling Chicago Film Festival 2009
- Official Selection Rochester ImageOut 2010
- Tampa International Gay and Lesbian Film Festival 2010
  - Outreach Award – Evgeny Afineevsky
- Official Selection 19th Tokyo International Lesbian & Gay Film Festival 2010
- 25th Turin LGBT Film Festival 2010
  - Audience Award for Best Comedy Feature Film
- WorldFest-Houston International Film Festival 2008 & 2010
  - Best Comedy - Adaptation or Original Screenplay - Evgeny Afineevsky
  - First Directors Crystal Vision Special Jury Award - Evgeny Afineevsky
  - Silver Remi Award - Evgeny Afineevsky
  - Special Jury Rising Star Award - Evgeny Afineevsky
