= Biggie: I Got a Story to Tell =

- Promotional poster
- Directed by: Emmett Malloy
- Written by: Sam Sweet
- Produced by: Wayne Barrow; Aaron L. Ginsburg; William Green; Terry Leonard; Daniel Pappas
- Starring: Christopher Wallace; Damion Butler; Sean Combs; Voletta Wallace
- Cinematography: Ben Kutchins
- Edited by: Neil Meiklejohn; Will Znidaric
- Music by: Adam Peters
- Production company: Netflix
- Distributed by: Netflix
- Release date: March 1, 2021
- Running time: 97 minutes
- Country: United States
- Language: English

Biggie: I Got a Story to Tell is a 2021 American biographical documentary film created for Netflix and directed by Emmett Malloy. The film offers a look into the life and musical career of rapper Christopher Wallace, better known by his stage names The Notorious B.I.G. and Biggie Smalls. It uses rare footage filmed by Wallace's close friend Damion "D-Roc" Butler along with interviews with family and friends, to offer an alternative perspective into Wallace's life. The film was released on March 1, 2021.
