= Being Eddie =

2025 documentary film

- Film poster
- Directed by: Angus Wall
- Produced by: John Davis; John Fox; Charisse M. Hewitt; Kent Kubena; Terry Leonard
- Cinematography: Alex Pollini
- Edited by: Will Znidaric
- Music by: Osei Essed
- Production company: Makemake
- Distributed by: Netflix
- Release date: November 12, 2025
- Running time: 103 minutes
- Country: United States
- Language: English

Being Eddie is a 2025 American documentary film about the actor and comedian Eddie Murphy. It is directed by Angus Wall. It was released on Netflix on November 12, 2025.

== Reception ==
On the review aggregator website Rotten Tomatoes, 74% of 27 critics' reviews are positive, with an average rating of 6.2/10. The website's consensus reads: "Being Eddie is a warm, polished, and affectionate portrait that, while not entirely in-depth, offers plenty of laughs and a lively celebration of Eddie Murphy's remarkable career and enduring influence." Metacritic, which uses a weighted average, assigned the film a score of 62 out of 100, based on seven critics, indicating "generally favorable" reviews.

Craig D. Lindsey of RogerEbert.com gave the film three out of four stars and wrote, "Murphy often sits with a cocked head to the side when he talks, remaining both sage and suave as he tells his life story, often looking like he's surprised most of it happened to him." Daniel Fienberg of The Hollywood Reporter wrote, "[Y]ou're gonna wanna watch Being Eddie because when Eddie Murphy wants to be, he's a spectacular storyteller and, as everybody already knows, an expert mimic."
