= 93: Battle for Ukraine =

2018 documentary series

- Directed by: Lydia Guzhva
- Written by: Vadym Vadey
- Produced by: Vadym Yaroslavovich Vadey; Lydia Guzhva
- Cinematography: Dmytro Minyailo, Oleksandr Dzhantimirov, Oleksiy Yurchenko
- Edited by: Dmitry Kisov, Vadym Vadey, Anton Degoda, Dmitry Zhdanov, Lydia Guzhva, Mikhail Voznenko
- Music by: Tin Sontsia (band), Serhiy Vasyliuk.
- Distributed by: Lidi Ya Films
- Release dates: 2018 (Part 1); 2020 (Part 2)
- Running time: 50 minutes (Part 1); 106 minutes (Part 2)
- Country: Ukraine
- Language: Ukrainian

93: Battle for Ukraine (Ukrainian: «93: бій за Україну», romanized: Biy za Ukrainu) is a Ukrainian series of documentary films, the first parts of which was originally released in 2018, directed by Lydia Guzhva based on an idea by Vadym Yaroslavovich Vadey. The documentary centres on the 93rd Brigade of the Ukrainian army and its role in the war in the Donbas against Russians and Russian-backed separatists. The documentary is told using a mixture of interviews with brigade members, film shot by members of the brigade during the conflict, and film shot by Guzhva and Vedey.

== Development ==
Vedey originally came up with the idea for the documentary during the conflict when he and Guzhva worked as freelance journalists. Vedey subsequently served as a soldier in the 93rd Brigade and then came up with the idea for an entire series of films about the conflict as told by 93rd Brigade members. The creative team spent three years editing the footage to create the documentary, with 50 different interviews with members and former members of the Ukrainian military. The first part, telling the story of the early part of the war including the battle of Ilovaisk, was released in 2018. The second part, telling the story of the battle for Donetsk airport was released in 2020. A third instalment is due to be released in 2021. The film has been dubbed into languages including English, German, and French with support from the Ukrainian Cultural Foundation.

== See also ==
- Winter on Fire: Ukraine's Fight for Freedom – 2015 documentary film
