= UnBroken =

2023 Holocaust documentary film by Beth Lane

- Directed by: Beth Lane
- Written by: Beth Lane
- Produced by: Beth Lane; Joel Moody; Barbara Gerson; Mark Gerson; Jen Lane Landolt; Mark Landolt; Andy Hall; Jennifer Sofio Hall; Angus Wall
- Starring: Philip Boehm; Gertrude Chapman; Renee Dicker; Ruth Gilliana; Beth Lane; Ginger Lane
- Cinematography: Olivia Aquilina
- Edited by: Aaron Soffin
- Music by: Jonathan Snipes
- Release date: 2023
- Running time: 96 minutes
- Countries: United States, Germany, Israel
- Languages: English, German

UnBroken is a 2023 documentary film about the daughter of a Holocaust survivor who embarks on an international quest to uncover answers about the plight of her mother and her six siblings, who, as children, escaped Nazi Germany relying solely on their youthful bravado and the kindness of German strangers.

== Background ==
A photograph of the seven Weber siblings, Alfons, Senta, Ruth, Gertrude, Renee, Judith, and Bela, hangs in the last gallery of the permanent collection at the United States Holocaust Memorial Museum in Washington, D.C. Their names, along with their parents, Alexander Weber, incarcerated at Plötzensee Prison and Oranienberg concentration camp in 1933, and Lina Banda Weber, murdered at Auschwitz concentration camp in 1943, are honored with Stolpersteine bricks in Berlin created by artist Gunter Demnig. The benevolent farmers, Arthur & Paula Schmidt, who hid the seven Weber siblings for two years during the Holocaust in a town called Worin, are commemorated in the Garden of the Righteous Among the Nations at Yad Vashem, the World Holocaust Memorial Center in Jerusalem, Israel. Two plaques commemorate Arthur & Paula Schmidt in the town of Worin, Germany.

== Synopsis ==
UnBroken chronicles how the seven Weber siblings, ages 6 –18, evaded certain capture and death and ultimately escaped Nazi Germany using their cunning instincts following their mother’s incarceration and murder at Auschwitz. Their lives changed forever when a benevolent farmer put them in the back of his truck and drove them to his fruit orchard 60 kilometers east of Berlin, where they were put into hiding in a laundry hut and spent two years on their own in war-torn Germany. Emboldened by their father’s mandate that they ‘always stay together,’ the children fought through hunger, loneliness, rape, bombings, and fear. Climactically separated from their father, the siblings declared themselves orphans to escape to a new life in America.

Filmmaker Lane, daughter of the youngest Weber sibling, embarks on a quest to retrace their steps, seeking answers to long-held questions about her family’s survival. The film examines the journey of the Webers as told through conversations with living siblings – now in their eighties and nineties – while Beth and her crew road trip across Germany, following the courageous, tumultuous, and harrowing path taken by her family over seventy years ago.

== Production ==
Principal photography began in March 2018 at Yad Vashem in Jerusalem. Filming continued in the U.S. in 2018 and in Germany in 2019. Post-production began in 2020 and was completed in August 2023.

== Release ==
Executive producer, director, and writer Beth Lane won the 32nd Annual Heartland International Film Festival in Indianapolis, Indiana Best Documentary Feature Premiere. The West Coast and California premiere took place on October 13, 2023 at the 24th Annual Newport Beach Film Festival. The 14th annual DOC NYC Film Festival hosted the NYC premiere on November 12 and 13, 2023. Following its initial festival run, the film was acquired by Greenwich Entertainment and had its nationwide release in February 21, 2025. On April 23, 2025, Yom HaShoah, the film premiered on Netflix where within 24 hours, it reached #5 in the top 10 movies in the US.
