= Beth Lane =

American film director

- Education: University of Michigan (BA); UCLA School of Theater, Film and Television (MA)
- Notable work: UnBroken (2025)
- Website: bethlane.com

Beth Lane is an American film director, producer, actress, dancer, singer and writer. Her debut feature documentary UnBroken (2025), premiered at the 32nd Heartland International Film Festival where it won Best Documentary Feature Premiere.

== Early life and education ==
Lane is the second child born to Holocaust survivor Ginger Speigel Lane, nee Bela Weber, and retired attorney Frederic S. Lane. She has an older brother and younger sister. She was raised in Chicago and her first foray into public performance was with Joyce and Byrne Piven's Young People’s Company alongside Joan Cusack and Ann Cusack. While attending New Trier East High School in Winnetka, Illinois, she landed a small role as a tap dancer in Tony Bill’s feature film My Bodyguard.

== Work ==
While working for her Master of Fine Arts in Theatre at the University of California, Los Angeles, she went into pre-production on her feature directorial debut documentary UnBroken. Following the film's festival run, it was acquired by Greenwich Entertainment and had its theatrical release on February 21, 2025, and later premiered on Netflix on April 23, 2025.

== Filmography ==
List of film credits of Beth Lane
Year	Title	Notes
2025	UnBroken	Director, writer and producer

== Awards and recognition ==
Award	Date	Category	Result	Ref.
Heartland International Film Festival	2023	Best Documentary Feature Premiere	Won	
Hot Springs International Women's Film Festival	2024	Best First-Time Filmmaker	Won	
Berkshire International Film Festival (BIFF)	2024	Documentary Feature	Won	
Julien Dubuque International Film Festival	2024	Best Documentary	Won	
RiverRun International Film Festival	2024	Best Documentary	Won	
Cleveland International Film Festival	2024	Greg Gund Memorial Standing Up Award	Nominated	
Boca International Jewish Film Festival	2025	Best Holocaust Documentary	Won	
Anthem Awards	2025	Human & Civil Rights: Documentary or Film	Won	
