= Francesco (2020 film) =

2020 documentary directed by Evgeny Afineevsky about Pope Francis

- Official poster
- Directed by: Evgeny Afineevsky
- Produced by: Evgeny Afineevsky; Den Tolmor; Eric Esrailian; Teri Schwartz
- Starring: Pope Francis
- Cinematography: Evgeny Afineevsky; Teodora Totoiu
- Edited by: Dan Swietlik
- Music by: Adam Peters
- Production companies: Afineevsky - Tolmor Production; UCLA School of Theater, Film, and Television; PFX Post Production and Visual Effects; Diamond Docs
- Distributed by: Discovery+; Abramorama
- Release dates: October 21, 2020 (Rome); March 26, 2021 (United States)
- Country: United States
- Languages: English; Spanish

Francesco is a 2020 American documentary film, directed and produced by Evgeny Afineevsky. It describes the life and teaching of Pope Francis.

The film had its world premiere at the Rome Film Festival on October 21, 2020. It was released in the United States through virtual cinema on March 26, 2021, by Abramorama, prior to streaming on Discovery+ on March 28, 2021.

== Synopsis ==
The film is about the life and the teaching of Pope Francis. It contains numerous interviews with Francis, some of his family members, Benedict XVI, and other people. The film is centered around contemporary issues, and the role of the Catholic Church in searching those who suffer injustice. The film also focuses on people who have been sentimentally touched by Pope Francis, such as "Myanmar's displaced Rohingya community, members of which Francis met in Bangladesh in 2017. [... ] [T]he 12 Muslim refugees the pope brought to Italy at the end of his visit to a refugee camp on the Greek island of Lesbos in 2016. And [...] clergy abuse victims Francis originally incensed during his 2018 visit to Chile".

== Release ==
The premiere of the film took place on 21 October 2020 at the Rome Film Festival. In January 2021, Discovery+ acquired U.S. distribution rights to the film and set it for a March 28, 2021, release. The film was released through virtual cinema on March 26, 2021, by Abramorma.

== Awards ==
On 22 October 2020, director of the film Evgeny Afineevsky received the 18th Kinéo Prize in the Vatican Gardens for this film for "promot[ing] social, humanitarian, and environmental issues in cinema". Some Holy See officials were present at the award ceremony, including Paolo Ruffini, prefect of the Dicastery for Communication, and the secretary of said dicastery Mgr Lucio Adrian Ruiz.

== Remark about same-sex civil union ==
In an interview in the film, Pope Francis supported same-sex civil union, stating: "Homosexuals have a right to be a part of the family. [...] What we have to create is a civil union law. That way they are legally covered. I stood up for that". This passage was from an interview from 2019, but this passage had been cut from the interview's public releases at the time. Pope Francis, by this comment, became the first pope to endorse same-sex civil unions.

After the premiere of Francesco on 21 October 2020, Massimiliano Menichetti, head of Vatican Radio and Vatican News, sent an e-mail to media outlets reporting on matters pertaining to the Holy See, telling them the Holy See for the time being would not comment on the subject, and asking them: "If you can, please report any reactions from listeners and followers in the middle or at the end of the day". On 30 October, the Secretariat of State sent a letter to all Catholic bishops' conferences about the remark made by Francis in the movie. The letter states that the remark about civil union was about "a ten-year-old local law in Argentina on 'marriage equality of same-sex couples' and his opposition to them as the then-Archbishop of Buenos Aires in this regard" and that the pope rejected homosexual marriage, and that in the same context Francis "had spoken about the rights of [homosexuals] to have certain legal protection".

On 22 October, Venezuelan President Maduro asked the next National Assembly (which was to be elected on 6 December) to consider a vote to legalise same-sex marriage, saying: "I have friends and acquaintances who are very happy with what the Pope said yesterday. I will leave that task, the task of LGBT marriage, to the next National Assembly".

== Reception ==
Francesco It holds a 71% approval rating on review aggregator website Rotten Tomatoes, based on 17 reviews, with an average of 5.7/10. On Metacritic, the film holds a rating of 37 out of 100, based on 4 critics, indicating "generally unfavorable reviews".

== See also ==
- Blessing of same-sex unions in Christian churches
- Catholic Church and gay marriage
- Pope Francis and homosexuality
