= Will Znidaric =

American film and television editor and producer

- Born: U.S.
- Occupation(s): Film and television editor, producer
- Years active: 1996–present

Will Znidaric is an American film and television editor and producer. He is best known for his work on The Greatest Night in Pop, Biggie: I Got a Story to Tell, Jane, and Five Came Back.

== Career ==
Znidaric graduated with a BA in film production at the USC School of Cinema-Television in 1996. He is a member of American Cinema Editors (ACE).

== Filmography ==
| Year | Title | Contribution | Note |
|---|---|---|---|
| 2025 | Being Eddie | Editor | Documentary |
| 2024 | The Greatest Night in Pop | Editor | Documentary |
| 2024 | The Indrani Mukerjea Story: Buried Truth | Supervising Editor | 4 episodes |
| 2022 | They Call Me Magic | Supervising Editor | 4 episodes |
| 2022 | Neymar: The Perfect Chaos | Editor and Co-Executive Producer | 3 episodes |
| 2021 | Biggie: I Got a Story to Tell | Editor | Documentary |
| 2021 | Naomi Osaka | Additional Editor | 3 episodes |
| 2020 | Freak Power: The Ballot or the Bomb | Supervising Editor | Documentary |
| 2020 | Killer Inside: The Mind of Aaron Hernandez | Editor | 3 episodes |
| 2019 | Shangri-La | Editor | 1 episode |
| 2019 | The Black Godfather | Editor | Documentary |
| 2018 | Quincy | Editor | Documentary |
| 2018 | Strokes of Genius | Editor | Documentary |
| 2017 | Five Came Back | Editor and Associate Producer | 3 episodes |
| 2017 | Jane | Additional Editor | Documentary |
| 2016 | Generation Hope | Editor | Documentary short |
| 2015 | 30 for 30 | Editor | 1 episode |
| 2015 | Winter on Fire: Ukraine's Fight for Freedom | Editor | Documentary |
| 2015 | (Dis)Honesty: The Truth About Lies | Additional Editor | Documentary |
| 2014 | Mission Blue | Additional Editor | Documentary |
| 2014 | Metallica: This Monster Lives | Editor | Documentary short |
| 2014 | NOW: In the Wings on a World Stage | Editor | Documentary |
| 2012 | Santa Land | Editor | Documentary short |
| 2010 | The Caregivers | Editor | Documentary short |
| 1996 | Blacktop Lingo | Cinematographer | Short film |

== Awards and nominations ==
| Year | Result | Award | Category | Work | Ref. |
|---|---|---|---|---|---|
| 2018 | Nominated | Primetime Emmy Awards | Outstanding Picture Editing for a Nonfiction Program | Jane | |
| 2018 | Won | American Cinema Editors | Best Edited Documentary - Feature | Jane | |
| 2018 | Won | American Cinema Editors | Best Edited Documentary - Television | Five Came Back | |
