= Winter on Fire: Ukraine's Fight for Freedom =

2015 documentary film

- Film poster
- Directed by: Evgeny Afineevsky
- Written by: Den Tolmor
- Based on: Euromaidan protests
- Produced by: Evgeny Afineevsky; Den Tolmor
- Narrated by: Cissy Jones
- Cinematography: Various
- Edited by: Will Znidaric
- Music by: Jasha Klebe
- Production companies: Netflix; Afineevsky-Tolmor Productions; Urkstream.tv; SPN Productions; Passion Pictures; Campbell Grobman Films; Rock Paper Scissors Entertainment
- Distributed by: Netflix
- Release dates: 3 September 2015 (Venice Film Festival); 9 October 2015 (Worldwide)
- Running time: 102 minutes
- Countries: Ukraine; United States; United Kingdom
- Languages: Ukrainian; Russian; English

Winter on Fire: Ukraine's Fight for Freedom (Ukrainian: «Зима у вогні: Боротьба України за свободу», romanized: Zyma u vohni: Borotba Ukrainy za svobodu) is a 2015 documentary film directed by Evgeny Afineevsky, written by Den Tolmor about the Euromaidan protests in Ukraine from 21 November 2013 to 23 February 2014.

Produced by Evgeny Afineevsky, Den Tolmor and Netflix, the film is a coproduction of Ukraine, the United States, and the United Kingdom.

== Plot ==
This documentary follows the 2013–2014 Maidan Uprising, in Kyiv, via a chronological approach to key events via historic footage and testimonies of two dozen protesters. The first events narrated are the expected EU-Ukraine trade agreement being promised as a way to elevate Ukraine's future, but this agreement is suddenly discarded in favor of one with Russia. Pro-Europe citizens organize protests and occupations, centered on and around Kyiv's Maidan Nezalezhnosti. After 4 months, the standoff between the government, its forces, and increasingly organized and dedicated protesters escalate into barricades, violent skirmishes, brutal repression, and deadly shootings by police on protesters. With the latest bloody and gruesome killings of protesters in February 2014, protest leaders vow to take down the government by force the following day. Ukraine's pro-Russia President Viktor Yanukovych flew to Russia in the early hours opening the way to new elections and a new Ukraine looking toward Europe.

== Release ==
Winter on Fire was screened at various film festivals before its release on 9 October 2015 on Netflix.

The film had its world premiere at the 72nd Venice International Film Festival. At the 2015 Toronto International Film Festival, it won the People's Choice Award for best documentary.

== Reception ==
=== Critical response ===
On Rotten Tomatoes, it has a rating of 88%, based on 25 reviews, with an average rating of 7.5. It also has a score of 79 out of 100 on Metacritic, based on 12 critics, indicating "generally favorable reviews".

Stephen Farber from The Hollywood Reporter gave the film a positive review, stating that "Afineevsky found a variety of witnesses, including student activists, journalists, laborers, artists and clergy, who all add sharp voices to the collage. One of the most engaging of these interviewees is a 12-year-old boy who offers a remarkably unjaundiced view of the turmoil." He praised the editing and music, but criticized the fact that "the film does grow repetitive, partly because it provides so little historical context or a larger overview of how the growing authoritarianism of Putin's Russia is affecting this part of the world. Yet there are unmistakably moving moments that convey the brutality of the government's response to an authentic popular movement".

Jay Weissberg from Variety stated that Winter on Fire is an "accessible film, with greater TV appeal, but it's also more limited by its insistence on shoehorning everything into one perspective, albeit a perspective shared by many."

Dan Fainaru of Screen Daily wrote, "Consistently avoiding any attempt at political analysis, Afineevsky's cameras show ever-expanding crowds, young and old, men and women, Christians, Jews, Muslims, academics and proletarians, all united under the one common cause, the removal of a man who, in their eyes, embodied the concept of corruption. Often exasperated by the politicians who were supposed to represent them and who cheated them, these people were willing to die, if necessary, to achieve their goal, displaying an idealistic fervour (i.e. the joined support of all religions) rarely encountered in normal circumstances". He also praised Will Znidaric for the editing, calling it "brisk and energetic".

Eric Kohn from IndieWire gave it a grade "A−" on scale of A to F, stating that "Winter on Fire features the intensity of an action movie and the fury of a clear-eyed polemic. [...] An exciting montage of the developing crowd ends with close to a million protestors gathered together at the centre of town in a stunning act of defiance. [...] Despite the ongoing power of these scenes, Winter on Fire achieves its finest shot with a bird’s eye view of the Maidan protests, as thousands of activists push back against a black mass of officers and congeal into an insurmountable wall. With images like these, Afineevsky doesn't need to push the message about the protesters' durability; it's right there on the screen."

Critics Lev Golinkin, Amy Cooter and Jay Weissberg criticized the film for showing several symbols and flags described as "neo-Nazi symbols used by extreme right wing protesters, left uncommented in the film." Golinkin was the most critical of the film. According to Golinkin, "The colorful array of activists, artists, scarf-wrapped babushki, bearded priests and fresh-faced students makes it appear as if Ukraine's people from all walks of life in participated in the Maidan uprising. But some are missing — neo-Nazis, who were edited out".

=== Accolades ===
The film was nominated for an Academy Award for Best Documentary Feature and the Primetime Emmy Award in the Exceptional Merit in Documentary Filmmaking category. It was also one of the winners of the 2016 Television Academy Honors.

== Impact ==
Winter on Fire was widely shown around in Caracas in 2017 during the Venezuelan anti-government protests, in which protesters were rallying against President Nicolás Maduro, and the 2019–20 Hong Kong protests. On 5 March 2022, in response to the Russian invasion of Ukraine, Netflix officially made the film available for free via its YouTube channel. In the same year, Afineevsky released the new companion film Freedom on Fire: Ukraine's Fight for Freedom.

== See also ==
- Freedom on Fire: Ukraine's Fight for Freedom
- 93: Battle for Ukraine
