= Cries from Syria =

- Film poster
- Directed by: Evgeny Afineevsky
- Narrated by: Helen Mirren
- Edited by: Aaron I. Butler
- Distributed by: HBO Films
- Release dates: January 22, 2017 (Sundance); March 13, 2017 (HBO)
- Running time: 111 minutes
- Country: United States

Cries from Syria is a 2017 documentary film about the Syrian Civil War, directed by Evgeny Afineevsky, and acquired by HBO. It contains video shot by Syrians with and interviews with guerrilla fighters, activists, journalists, defected military men, and refugees, some that are children.

In an interview Afineesky said, "I tried to put together a comprehensive story so that people can not only learn from the historical mistakes, but so people can reevaluate what we have on our hands."

On November 2, 2017, Afineevsky was named the Best Director at the annual Critics' Choice Movie Awards in New York (conducted by the Broadcast Film Critics Association and the Broadcast Television Journalists Association). The nominations for Cries from Syria were Best Documentary, Best Director and Best Song in a Documentary (‘Prayers for this World’ written by Diane Warren, and recorded by Cher along with the West Los Angeles Children's Choir).. The film won the Cinema for Peace Most Valuable Documentary Award in 2018.
