= Outreach (Catholic website) =

LGBTQ+ resource and organization

- Formation: May 1, 2022; 4 years ago
- Founder: James Martin, S.J.
- Official language: English
- Editor: James Martin, S.J.
- Executive Director: Michael J. O'Loughlin
- Managing Editor: Ryan Di Corpo
- Technical Advisor: Jai Sen
- Key people: St. Joseph (Patron Saint)
- Parent organization: America magazine
- Affiliations: Catholic Church
- Website: outreach.faith

Outreach (formally known as Outreach: An LGBTQ Catholic Resource) is a Catholic news and opinion site for LGBTQ Catholics. The organization was founded by Jesuit priest James Martin in conjunction with America magazine. The site features news stories, opinion pieces and resources pertaining to the Catholic Church and the LGBTQ community.

The website provides a list of social media accounts for Facebook, X, Instagram, and YouTube. It also includes a link to the suicide hotline website and links to LGBT Catholic and non-Catholic resources. These include a link to the list of LGBT friendly Catholic Churches provided by New Ways Ministry, and a list of LGBT-friendly Catholic organizations.

The website also features a section titled "The Outreach Guide to the Bible and Homosexuality." This section encompasses a variety of voices, scholarly, theological, and magisterial; who go through and dismantle biblical arguments against homosexuality.

== History ==
Outreach was founded in 2022 by James Martin, S.J. after he published his 2017 book Building a Bridge, in which he called for the Catholic hierarchy to treat LGBTQ Catholics with "respect, compassion and sensitivity" in the wake of the Pulse nightclub shooting in Orlando. Every year over the summer (usually during Pride Month), Outreach holds a conference with several keynote speakers, discussion panels, resources, and mass. Outreach has employed support from DignityUSA and New Ways Ministry, and Catholic LGBT organizations and support networks.

The organization's website includes a new section called "The Gaudete" which features articles from Christian (primarily Catholic) writers pertaining to LGBT issues. These articles come from journalists, priests, authors, laity, psychologists, academics, and theologians. The articles cover a plurality of topics regarding LGBT issues. Topics cover issues on gender, race, religious trauma, sexual ethics, transgender identity and politics within the catholic Church.

== Reactions ==
Pope Francis:

In the 2022 Outreach conference, Pope Francis sent a letter to the organizations stating:

Dear brother,

Thank you for the letter you sent me a few weeks ago, along with the "Outreach 2022" brochure. Congratulations for having been able to make the event happen this year in person.

I am aware that the most valuable thing is not what appears in the brochure or in the photos, but what happened in interpersonal encounters. In fact, the pandemic made us seek alternatives to shorten the distances. It also taught us that certain things are irreplaceable, among them the possibility to look at each other "face to face," even with those who think differently or those whose differences seem to separate or even confront us. When we overcome these barriers, we realize that there is more that unites us than separates us.

I encourage you all to keep working in the culture of encounter, which shortens the distances and enriches us with differences, in the same manner of Jesus, who made himself close to everyone.

I assure you of my prayers. Don't stop praying for me. May Jesus bless you and the Blessed Virgin care for you.

Fraternally,

Francis

— Pope Francis

In the 2023 conference, Pope Francis sent another greeting which stated "I send my best regards to the members of the meeting at Fordham University," telling the members to pray for him as he is praying for them.

Catholic Hierarchy:

Many members of the magisterium have personally contributed to the articles in the Gaudete, including Bishop John Dolan, Archbishop Mark Coleridge, Bishop John Stowe, and Charles Bouchard OP. Other clergy have given responses to Outreach conferences; Cardinal Dolan, the fromer archbishop of New York City, sent a letter to James Martin during the 2023 Outreach conference stating, "It is the sacred duty of the Church and Her ministers to reach out to those on the periphery and draw them to a closer relationship with Jesus Christ and His Church. Your vital and important ministry is a valuable and necessary contribution to that effort."

Archbishop Lori of Baltimore sent an email to James Martin in regards to the Outreach organization. Archbishop Lori stated his regret that the Catholic Church has caused much harm and trauma to LGBT Catholics. He further quoted the Catechism calling for more compassion and charity when ministering to LGBT Catholics. He further clarified, however, that the Church's teachings on sexual ethics cannot change and provides a list of 6 pastoral guidelines for LGBT+ Catholics.

1. Pastoral accompaniment recognizes the reality of our need. This need is the shared desire of all persons to find "intimacy with the Triune God: Father, Son, and Holy Spirit.”

2. Pastoral accompaniment shows compassion, respect, and sensitivity. In communion with the pastoral vision of Pope Francis, "LGBT persons are not a problem to be solved." Instead, they are persons to be loved.

3. Pastoral accompaniment journeys together in light of our calling. That calling is to a life of holiness, which is guided by both "the teaching authority of the Church" and the Holy Spirit.

4. Pastoral accompaniment has a different kind of conversation. This is not a conversation full of polemics and "false dichotomies," but a conversation that stands us squarely in the public forum "to be a light to the nations."

5. Pastoral accompaniment lives rooted in the Church. Archbishop Lori reminds his flock that "the Church is not a club or a political party." It is the Body of Christ, a place where everybody should feel like they belong.

6. Pastoral accompaniment is willing to make the long journey. The path toward discipleship is "long and challenging," the archbishop writes. But Christ "is alive and active here and now."

— Archbishop Lori, Outreach Catholic
