= Evgeny Afineevsky =

American film director (born 1972)

- Евгений Афинеевский
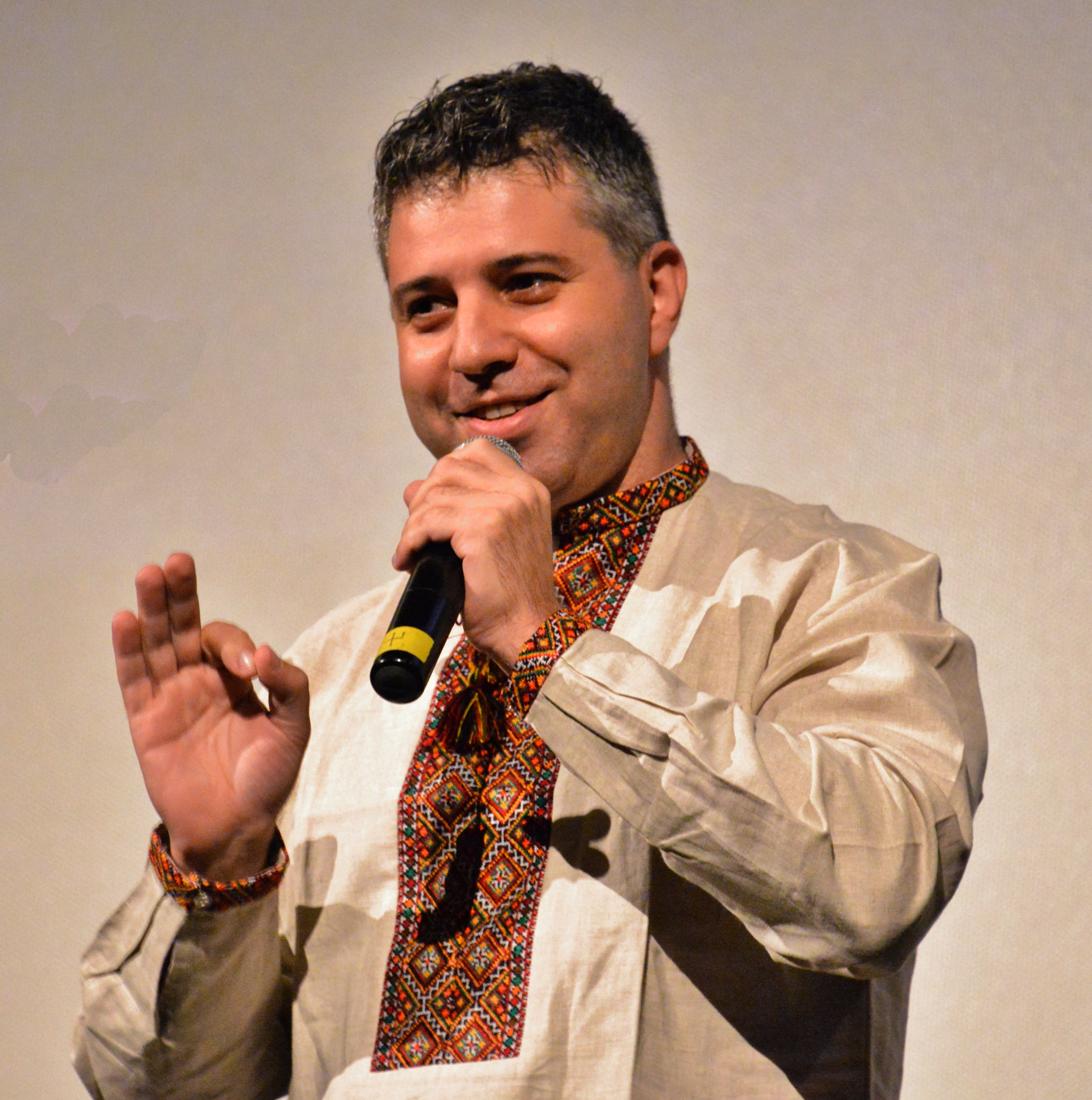
- Afineevsky in 2015
- Born: October 21, 1972 (age 53); Kazan, Tatar ASSR, Russian SFSR, Soviet Union
- Citizenship: United States & State of Israel
- Occupations: Film director, producer and cinematographer
- Years active: 1999–present
- Notable work: Winter on Fire: Ukraine's Fight for Freedom, Cries from Syria
- Awards

Evgeny Mikhailovich Afineevsky (Russian: Евгений Михайлович Афинеевский; born October 21, 1972) is an Israeli-American film director, producer and cinematographer. He received an Academy Award nomination for Best Documentary Feature and multiple Primetime Emmy Award nominations for the 2015 documentary Winter on Fire. Afineevsky resides in the United States.

== Early life ==
Afineevsky was born in Kazan, Tatar ASSR, Russian SFSR, Soviet Union on October 21, 1972, to a Russian-Jewish family. In the early 1990s, Afineevsky became an Israeli citizen and served in the Israeli Defence Forces. In the late 1990s, Afineevsky moved to Los Angeles, where he has worked in film production and direction since 1999. Afineevsky is openly gay.

== Career ==
=== Early Israeli and American works ===
As a teenager, Afineevsky directed a documentary that won a festival prize at an event in Kazan, leading to his participation in the Black Sea International Film Festival hosted by the USSR Pioneer Camp Orlyonok in Krasnodar region, Russia.

In Israel, from 1994 to 2000, Afineevsky coordinated and produced more than 30 musicals including “Bat” (Die Fledermaus), Gypsy Baron, Viennese Blood, Night in Venice, Silva Princess of Csárdás, and Mozart Konzerte with the Prague National Opera Orchestra. From 1997 to 1999 he produced and co-directed two stage plays, The Mousetrap and Spider Web, by Agatha Christie.

"In 1999, still in Israel, he directed the TV series Days of Love. In 2000–2002, he produced three feature films, Crime & Punishment, starring Crispin Glover, John Hurt, Clive Revill, and Margot Kidder; Death Game, starring Billy Drago, Joe Lara, Richard Lynch and Bo Brown; and The Return from India, starring Aki Avni, Riki Gal, Assi Dayan, Dana Parnas and Orly Perl."

"As producer of The Return from India (2002), Afineevsky received the Israeli Grand from the Israeli Film Fund. In 2005, he received The Gold Special Jury Award from the 38th Annual Houston Worldfest for The Return from India. In 2007, he received the Platinum Remi Award from the 40th Annual Houston Worldfest for his film Crime & Punishment (2002). In 2008, he received the Platinum Remi Award from the 41st Annual Houston Worldfest for his film Death Game (2002). Oy Vey! My Son Is Gay! was his feature directorial debut for which he collected over 23 awards in the US and abroad. He created the educational documentary project Divorce: A Journey Through the Kids’ Eyes, which received awards and recognition from the US festival circuit."

=== Documentaries on Ukraine and Syria ===
His historical feature documentary Winter on Fire was an official selection of the Venice and Telluride international film festivals, received the People's Choice Award for the Best Documentary from the Toronto International Film Festival, the 2016 Television Academy Honors Award and was nominated for an Academy Award in the Best Documentary category and the Primetime Emmy Awards in the Exceptional Merit in Documentary Filmmaking category. The film covered the Euromaidan protests in Ukraine.

In 2016, Afineevsky filmed extensively in Syria for the documentary Cries from Syria, which later became an Official Selection at the 2017 Sundance Film Festival. HBO acquired US TV rights to Cries from Syria and broadcast it on March 13, 2017. It was also shown on HBO NOW, HBO GO, HBO On Demand and affiliate portals.

In August 2017 Afineevsky was awarded with the Friend of the Free Press Trophy by the Los Angeles Press Club for his work on Cries from Syria. He was named the Best Director at the annual Critics' Choice Documentary Awards in New York on November 2, 2017. On November 21, 2017 Producers Guild of America named Cries from Syria among the nominees for the Outstanding Producer of Documentary Motion Pictures Award. He and his film earned IPA Satellite Awards nominations for Best Documentary and Best Song in a Documentary for PRAYERS FOR THIS WORLD, performed by Cher. The Awards Circuit Community Awards nominated his movie as Best Documentary Feature for 2017. He won International Documentary Association’s Courage Under Fire Award, earned a PGA Award nomination, won a Humanitas Prize and Cinema for Peace Awards as Most Valuable Documentary of the Year, won 32nd Fort Lauderdale Film Festival, Documentaries Without Borders Film Festival and 51st Houston WorldFest Film Festival, as well as the Overseas Press Club’s Peter Jennings Award. During 2018, Afineevsky and his movie Cries from Syria earned four Emmy nominations.

In 2022, Afineevsky released a documentary Freedom on Fire: Ukraine's Fight for Freedom.

=== Francesco ===
Afineevsky’s documentary Francesco, released in 2020, features Pope Francis. A segment of the film featuring Pope Francis discussing same-sex civil unions received significant media coverage and commentary from Catholic and secular sources. In the documentary, Bergoglio declared, with multiple cuts nonetheless.

"Homosexuals have a right to be a part of the family. [...] They’re children of God and have a right to a family. Nobody should be thrown out, or be made miserable because of it. [...] What we have to create is a civil union law. I stood up for that."

According to Deadline Hollywood, the statement stirred controversy as it was regarded as contradicting Catholic teachings on homosexuality which officially categorises homosexual activity as "deviant behavior." Afineevsky said concerning this film: "I am not trying to do propaganda. What I'm trying to do, I’m trying to show to the people what they're missing."

== Awards ==
On February 21, 2020, Catholics in Media Associates awarded him with 2020 CIMA Social Justice Award.

In 2018, he received the Cinema for Peace Award for most valuable documentary of the Year for his movie Cries from Syria.

In 2015, Afineevsky received the Cross of Ivan Mazepa from the President of Ukraine for his documentary work on Winter on Fire.

== Filmography ==
- Death Game (2001)
- Crime and Punishment (2002)
- Oy Vey! My Son Is Gay!! (2009)
- Open Heart (2012)
- Divorce: A Journey Through the Kids' Eyes (2014)
- Winter on Fire: Ukraine's Fight for Freedom (2016)
- Cries from Syria (2017)
- Francesco (2020)
- Freedom on Fire: Ukraine's Fight for Freedom (2022)
- Children in the Fire (2025)
