= Deaths in August 2003 =

The following is a list of notable deaths in August 2003.

Entries for each day are listed alphabetically by surname. A typical entry lists information in the following sequence:

- Name, age, country of citizenship at birth, subsequent country of citizenship (if applicable), reason for notability, cause of death (if known), and reference.

== August 2003 ==
=== 1 ===
- Tom Lewis, 78, American politician, member of the United States House of Representatives (1983-1995).
- Bob McMaster, 81, Australian wrestler and rugby player.
- Guy Thys, 80, Belgian national football coach.
- Marie Trintignant, 41, French actress and daughter of actor Jean-Louis Trintignant, beaten.
- Gordon Arnaud Winter, 90, Canadian Lieutenant Governor of Newfoundland.

=== 2 ===
- Ken Coote, 75, English footballer.
- Don Estelle, 70, British actor.
- Vladimir Golovanov, 64, Russian weightlifter and Olympian (1964).
- Sir Charles Kerruish, 86, Manx politician.
- Mike Levey, 55, American infomercial host, cancer.
- Paulinho Nogueira, 75, Brazilian guitarist, singer and composer.
- Mohamad Adnan Robert, 85, Malaysian politician, Governor of Sabah.
- Willem Wilmink, 66, Dutch poet and writer.
- Lesley Woods, 92, American radio, stage and television actress.

=== 3 ===
- Les Bell, 77, Australian rugby league footballer.
- Norah Isaac, 88, Welsh author, drama producer and campaigner for Welsh-language education.
- Joseph Saidu Momoh, 66, President of Sierra Leone.
- Peter Safar, 79, Austrian-born American physician, cancer.
- Roger Voudouris, 48, American singer-songwriter and guitarist, liver disease.

=== 4 ===
- Pål Arne Fagernes, 29, Norwegian javelin thrower and Olympian (1996, 2000), traffic collision.
- Chung Mong-hun, 54, Korean businessman, suicide by jumping.
- Frederick Chapman Robbins, 86, American pediatrician and virologist.
- Alice Saunier-Seité, 78, French geographer, historian, academic and politician of the Parti Républicain.
- Sarup Singh, 86, Indian academic and politician.
- Anthony of Sourozh, 89, Russian monk, broadcaster, longest-ordained hierarch of the Russian Orthodox Church.
- Redd Stewart, 80, American country music songwriter and recording artist.
- František Vlk, 78, Czech footballer.
- James Welch, 62, American Blackfeet and Gros Ventre writer and poet (Winter in the Blood, Fools Crow), lung cancer.

=== 5 ===
- Tite Curet Alonso, 77, Puerto Rican music composer, critic and journalist, heart attack.
- Dick Fouts, 69, Canadian football player.
- Maurice Mollin, 79, Belgian racing cyclist.
- Manuel Mur Oti, 94, Spanish screenwriter and film director.
- Samuel J. Tedesco, 88, American politician, Lieutenant Governor of Connecticut.
- Don Turnbull, 66, English journalist and games magazine editor.
- Benjamin Vaughan, 85, Welsh Anglican priest, Bishop of Swansea and Brecon.
- Robert Joseph Ward, 77, American district judge (United States District Court for the Southern District of New York).

=== 6 ===
- Julius Baker, 87, American flute player, principal flutist of the New York Philharmonic for 18 years.
- Robin Banerjee, 94, Indian environmentalist and wildlife photographer.
- Louis Lasagna, 80, American physician and professor of medicine, lymphoma.
- Roberto Marinho, 98, Brazilian businessman, lung cancer.
- Grover Mitchell, 73, American jazz trombonist, cancer.
- Christine Noonan, 58, British actress (If....), cancer.
- Wilhelm Schneemelcher, 88, German Protestant theologian
- Larry Taylor, 85, English actor and stuntman.
- David Webster 72, British BBC television producer and executive

=== 7 ===
- Carlo Felice Bianchi Anderloni, 87, Italian automobile designer.
- Grigory Bondarevsky, 83, Russian professor, writer, and historian, murdered.
- Antoni Janik, 83, Polish footballer.
- Charles Jones, 85, Australian politician.
- Roxie Collie Laybourne, 92, American ornithologist.
- Mickey McDermott, 74, American baseball player (Boston Red Sox, Washington Senators, Kansas City Athletics), colorectal cancer.
- F. T. Prince, 90, British poet and academic.
- Pierre Vilar, 97, French historian, authoritative historian of Spain.
- Rajko Žižić, 48, Yugoslavian basketball player and Olympian (1976, 1980, 1984), heart attack.

=== 8 ===
- Martha Chase, 75, American geneticist, pneumonia.
- Robert J. Donovan, 90, American correspondent, author and presidential historian.
- Giant Ochiai, 30, Japanese professional wrestler.
- Lilli Gyldenkilde, 67, Danish politician, cancer.
- Bhupen Khakhar, 69, Indian contemporary artist, cancer.
- Frank Large, 63, English football player.
- Allan McCready, 86, New Zealand politician.
- Jack Noreiga, 67, West Indian cricket player.
- Lenton Parr, 78, Australian sculptor and teacher.
- Antonis Samarakis, 83, Greek writer of the post-war generation, heart attack.
- Edna Skinner, 82, American film and television actress.
- Falaba Issa Traoré, 73, Malian writer, comedian, playwright, and theatre and film director.

=== 9 ===
- Enrico Bisio, 68, Italian Olympic field hockey player (1960).
- Jimmy Davis, 21, English football player, traffic collision.
- Jacques Deray, 74, French film director and screenwriter, cancer.
- Hans Frischknecht, 80, Swiss Olympic long-distance runner (1948).
- Ray Harford, 58, English football manager, lung cancer.
- Gregory Hines, 57, American dancer, actor, liver cancer.
- Onni Kasslin, 76, Finnish Olympic cyclist (1948, 1952).
- Chester Ludgin, 77, American baritone, cancer.
- Lesley Manyathela, 21, South African soccer player, traffic collision.
- Stewart McColl, 23, Australian racing driver.
- Bill Perkins, 79, American cool jazz saxophonist and flutist.
- William "Billy" George Rogell, 98, American baseball player (Boston Red Sox, Detroit Tigers, Chicago Cubs).
- Bhabesh Chandra Sanyal, 101, Indian painter, sculptor and art teacher.
- Trevor Smith, 67, English football player, lung cancer.
- Herbie Steward, 77, American jazz saxophonist.
- Esmond Wright, 87, British historian, media personality and politician (Member of Parliament for Glasgow Pollok).

=== 10 ===
- Kimal Akishev, 79, Kazakhstani scientist, archeologist, and historian.
- Constance Chapman, 91, English actor.
- Carmita Jiménez, 64, Puerto Rican singer.
- Bob McDougal, 82, American football player (Green Bay Packers).
- Cedric Price, 68, English architect and writer.

=== 11 ===
- Roger Antoine, 81, French basketball player and Olympian (1956, 1960).
- Armand Borel, 80, Swiss mathematician.
- Herb Brooks, 66, American hockey player, Olympian (1964, 1968), and coach (1980 Olympic gold medal winning "Miracle on Ice" hockey team), traffic collision.
- Jean Courteaux, 76, French football player.
- Jean Dréjac, 82, French singer and composer.
- Basil Kelly, 73, Bahamian Olympic sailor (1952, 1960, 1964).
- Diana Mosley, 93, English socialite, one of the Mitford sisters and widow of fascist leader Oswald Mosley, stroke.
- Martin O'Connell, 87, Canadian politician, member of the House of Commons of Canada (1968-1972, 1974-1979).
- John K. G. Shearman, 72, British art historian.
- Joseph Ventaja, 73, French boxer and Olympian (1952).
- Dennis Walker, 58, English football player.
- Sigmund Widmer, 84, Swiss historian, writer and politician.

=== 12 ===
- Christian Boussus, 95, French tennis player.
- Sir William Douglas, 81, Barbadian jurist, Chief Justice of Barbados (1965–1986).
- Håkon Kyllingmark, 88, Norwegian military officer and businessman.
- Edward Skottowe Northrop, 92, American district judge (United States District Court for the District of Maryland).
- Walter J. Ong, 90, American Jesuit priest, professor of English literature, historian, and philosopher.
- Fred I. Parker, 65, American judge.
- Étienne Rolland, 90, French Olympic basketball player (1936).

=== 13 ===
- Ward Bennett, 85, American designer and artist.
- Charlie Devens, 93, American baseball player (New York Yankees).
- Lothar Emmerich, 61, German football player, lung cancer.
- Michael Maclagan, 89, British historian.
- Ed Townsend, 74, American songwriter and producer, heart attack.

=== 14 ===
- Moshe Carmel, 92, Israeli Major General and politician.
- Antonio Conelli, 93, Italian swimmer and Olympian (1928).
- Viktor Ivanov, 72, Russian rower and Olympic silver medalist (1956).
- Lev Kerbel, 85, Soviet and Russian sculptor of socialist realist works.
- Donal Lamont, 92, Irish-Rhodesian Roman Catholic bishop and Nobel Peace Prize nominee.
- William H. Orrick Jr., 87, American attorney and judge.
- Helmut Rahn, 73, German footballer.
- Robin Thompson, 72, Irish rugby player.
- Kirk Varnedoe, 57, American art historian, chief curator at the Museum of Modern Art, cancer.

=== 15 ===
- Janny Brandes-Brilleslijper, 86, Dutch nurse, Nazi resister and last known person to see Anne Frank.
- Arnaldo Fabris, 86, Italian Olympic ice hockey player (1948).
- Red Hardy, 80, American baseball player (New York Giants).
- Nehemia Levtzion, 67, Israeli scholar of African history.
- Enric Llaudet, 86, Spanish businessman and sports executive.
- Gerhard Mauz, 77, German journalist and correspondent for judicial processes.
- Eric Nisenson, 57, American author and jazz historian, kidney failure related to leukemia.

=== 16 ===
- Idi Amin, 78, Ugandan military officer, President of Uganda (1971-1979).
- Ali Bakar, 55, Malaysian footballer and Olympian (1972), heart attack.
- Nandor Balazs, 77, Hungarian-American physicist.
- Bert Crane, 80, Australian politician.
- Ivo Ivaniš, 27, Croatian water polo player and Olympian (2000).
- Gus Mancuso, 89, Canadian ice hockey player (Montreal Canadiens, New York Rangers).
- Manuel Peçanha, 85, Brazilian football player.
- Gösta Sundqvist, 46, Finnish musician and radio personality, heart attack.
- Fernand Voussure, 85, Belgian footballer.
- James Whitehead, 67, American poet and novelist (Joiner).

=== 17 ===
- Ben Belitt, 92, American poet and translator.
- Mazen Dana, 43, Palestinian journalist, shot by US Army.
- Haroldo de Campos, 73, Brazilian poet, critic, professor and translator.
- Connie Douglas Reeves, 101, member of the National Cowgirl Museum and Hall of Fame, complications following a fall.

=== 18 ===
- Don Eliason, 85, American gridiron football and basketball player (Boston Celtics).
- Álvaro Gaxiola, 66, Mexican diver and Olympian (1960, 1964, 1968).
- Tony Jackson, 65, English singer and bass-guitar player, alcoholism, liver cirrhosis.
- Jocelyne Jocya, 61, French singer and songwriter, breast cancer.
- Jouni Kailajärvi, 65, Finnish weightlifter and Olympian (1960, 1964, 1968).
- Shirley Jane Turner, 42, Canadian family member, suicide by drowning.
- Zachary Turner, 1, Canadian family member, murder by drowning.
- Pedro Votta, 66, Uruguayan Olympic boxer (1960).

=== 19 ===
- Al Bansavage, 65, American professional football player (USC, Los Angeles Chargers, Oakland Raiders).
- Dennis Flynn, 79, Canadian politician, heart attack.
- Lester Mondale, 99, American Unitarian minister and humanist.
- John Munro, 72, Canadian politician (member of Parliament of Canada representing Hamilton East, Ontario).
- Carlos Roberto Reina, 77, Honduran politician, lawyer and diplomat, president (1994-1998), suicide by gunshot.
- Notable victims killed in the Canal Hotel bombing in Baghdad, Iraq:
  - Gillian Clark, 47, Canadian aid worker for the Christian Children's Fund
  - Reham Al-Farra, 29, Jordanian diplomat and journalist.
  - Arthur Helton, 54, American Director of peace and conflict studies at the U.S. Council on Foreign Relations.
  - Jean-Sélim Kanaan, 33, Egyptian, Italian and French United Nations diplomat and member of Sérgio Vieira de Mello's staff.
  - Sérgio Vieira de Mello, 55, Brazilian UN diplomat and Secretary-General's Special Representative in Iraq.
  - Fiona Watson, 35, Scottish member of Vieira de Mello's staff, political affairs officer.
  - Nadia Younes, 57, Egyptian United Nations aide, chief of staff for Vieira de Mello.

=== 20 ===
- Igor Farkhutdinov, 53, Russian politician, Governor of Sakhalin Oblast (since 1995), helicopter crash.
- John Harvey, 63, English cricket player.
- Ian MacDonald, 54, British music critic, suicide.
- Hayriye Ayşe Nermin Neftçi, 78/79, Turkish jurist and politician.
- John Ogbu, 64, Nigerian-American anthropologist and professor, post-surgery heart attack.
- Andrew Ray, 64, British actor, heart attack.

=== 21 ===
- Vasily Borisov, 80, Soviet rifle shooter and Olympic champion (1956, 1960).
- Ken Coleman, 78, American radio and television sportscaster.
- John Coplans, 83, British artist, art writer, curator, and museum director.
- Frank Harlan Freedman, 78, American district judge (United States District Court for the District of Massachusetts).
- Bill Montgomery, 80, American football player (Chicago Cardinals).
- Ismail Abu Shanab, 52–53, Palestinian political leader, founder and second in command of Hamas, Israeli helicopter missile strike.
- Lambis Serafidis, 73, Greek footballer.
- Kathy Wilkes, 57, English philosopher and education worker in Eastern Europe.
- Wesley Willis, 40, American singer-songwriter and visual artist, leukemia.

=== 22 ===
- Imperio Argentina, 92, Argentine actress and singer.
- Colleen Browning, 85, American painter.
- Julie Dusanko, 81, Canadian baseball player.
- Arnold Gerschwiler, 89, Swiss figure skating trainer.
- Jindřich Polák, 78, Czech film and television director.
- Tony Rudd, 80, British engineer involved in aero engine design and motor racing.
- V. Somashekhar, 66, Indian film director, producer and screenwriter, kidney failure.
- Floyd Tillman, 88, American country musician and honky tonk pioneer.

=== 23 ===
- Hy Anzell, 79, American actor (Little Shop of Horrors, Checking Out, Bananas, Annie Hall).
- J. Bowyer Bell, 71, American historian, artist and art critic, best known as a terrorism expert, kidney failure.
- Bobby Bonds, 57, American baseball player (San Francisco Giants, California Angels), brain cancer, lung cancer.
- Maurice Buret, 94, French Olympic equestrian competitor (1948).
- Mal Colston, 65, Australian politician, biliary tract cancer.
- Jack Dyer, 89, Australian rules football legend.
- John Geoghan, 68, American pedophile priest, blunt trauma.
- Marion Hargrove, 83, American writer.
- Robert N. C. Nix, Jr., 75, American judge, chief justice of the Pennsylvania Supreme Court (1984-1996), Alzheimer's disease.
- A. N. Murthy Rao, 103, Indian writer and activist.
- Michael Kijana Wamalwa, 58, Kenyan politician, eighth Vice-President of Kenya.

=== 24 ===
- Robert C. Bruce, 88, American actor.
- John Melville Burgess, 94, American bishop of the Episcopal Diocese of Massachusetts, first African-American to head an Episcopal diocese.
- Phuntsho Choden, 92, Queen consort of Bhutan.
- André Glatigny, 89, French Olympic middle-distance runner (1936).
- Franklin Green, 70, American Olympic free-pistol sport shooter.
- Theodore Lettvin, 76, American concert pianist and conductor.
- Bárbara Plaza, 26, Spanish rhythmic gymnast.
- John Jacob Rhodes, 86, American politician (House Minority Leader, U.S. Representative for Arizona's 1st congress. dist.), cancer.
- Amina Rizk, 93, Egyptian actress, heart attack.
- Wilfred Thesiger, 93, British explorer.
- Zena Walker, 69, British actress (A Day in the Death of Joe Egg, Man at the Top, The Dresser), Tony winner (1968).
- Kent Walton, 86, British sports commentator, known for his wrestling commentary on ITV's World of Sport from 1955 to 1988.

=== 25 ===
- Tom Feelings, 70, American cartoonist, children's book illustrator, and author.
- Mike Magac, 65, American football player (San Francisco 49ers, Pittsburgh Steelers).
- Romuald Paszkiewicz, 62, Polish Olympic volleyball player (1968).
- Hjalmar Pettersson, 96, Swedish Olympic cyclist (1928).
- Ajit Vachani, 52, Indian film and television actor.
- Waid Vanderpoel, 81, American financier and conservationist.

=== 26 ===
- Wayne Andre, 71, American jazz trombonist and session musician (Liza Minnelli, Bruce Springsteen, Alice Cooper).
- Tuanku Bahiyah, 73, Malaysian sultanah and raja, cancer.
- Lucius Burckhardt, 78, Swiss sociologist and economist.
- Wilma Burgess, 64, American country music singer ("Misty Blue", "Baby", "Don't Touch Me"), heart attack.
- Clive Charles, 51, English football player, coach and television announcer, prostate cancer.
- Hans Fränkel, 86, German-American sinologist.
- Peter Harper, 81, British racing driver.
- Bimal Kar, 81, Bengali writer and novelist.
- Keith J. Laidler, 87, English-Canadian Canadian physical chemist.
- Hasan Mammadov, 64, Soviet/Azerbaijani film actor.
- Jim Wacker, 66, American college football coach (Texas Christian University, University of Minnesota), cancer.

=== 27 ===
- Mick Connelly, 87, New Zealand politician.
- Herman van den Engel, 84, Dutch footballer.
- Jinx Falkenburg, 84, American actress and model.
- Pierre Poujade, 82, French populist politician.
- William J. Scherle, 80, American politician, member of the United States House of Representatives (1967-1975).
- Nikolai Todorov, 82, Bulgarian historian and politician, acting President (1990).
- Charles Van Horne, 82, Canadian politician (member of Parliament of Canada representing Restigouche—Madawaska, New Brunswick).

=== 28 ===
- William Cochran, 81, British physicist, amyotrophic lateral sclerosis.
- Michel Constantin, 79, French film actor, heart attack.
- Peter Hacks, 75, German playwright and author.
- François Missoffe, 83, French politician and diplomat.
- Yury Saulsky, 74, Soviet and Russian composer, author.
- David Truman, 90, American academic.

=== 29 ===
- Herbert Abrams, 82, American portrait artist (Jimmy Carter, George H. W. Bush, William Westmoreland, Arthur Miller).
- Mohammad Baqir al-Hakim, 63, Iraqi cleric and politician, bombing.
- Horace W. Babcock, 90, American astronomer, director of the Palomar Observatory from 1964 to 1978.
- Anant Balani, 41, Indian film director and screenwriter, heart attack.
- Aad de Jong, 81, Dutch footballer and Olympian (1952).
- Nguyen Xuan Oanh, 82, Vietnamese economist and politician.
- Patrick Procktor, 67, British painter and printmaker.
- Bruno Sutkus, 79, Lithuanian-German sniper during World War II, credited with 209 kills.
- George Thoms, 76, Australian cricket player.
- Corrado Ursi, 95, Italian prelate of the Roman Catholic Church.
- Vladimír Vašíček, 83, Czech painter.

=== 30 ===
- Robert Abplanalp, 81, American inventor and industrialist, confidant of Richard Nixon, lung cancer.
- Webster Anderson, 70, American U.S. Army soldier and Medal of Honor recipient for his actions in the Vietnam War.
- Charles Bronson, 81, American actor (The Magnificent Seven, Once Upon a Time in the West, The Great Escape), pneumonia.
- Donald Davidson, 86, American philosopher.
- Claude Passeau, 94, American baseball player (Pittsburgh Pirates, Philadelphia Phillies, Chicago Cubs).

=== 31 ===
- Pierre Cahuzac, 76, French football player and manager.
- Jelena de Belder-Kovačič, 78, Slovenian-Belgian botanist and horticulturist.
- Jack Hutchinson, 80, Australian rugby league footballer.
- Choe In-dok, 85, North Korean army officer and politician.
- Nev Munro, 76, Canadian Olympic basketball player (1948).
- John Storrs, 83, American architect in Oregon.
- Pavel Tigrid, 85, Czech writer, publisher, author and politician, suicide.
- Jung Yong-hoon, 24, South Korean footballer, traffic collision.
