= Sergio (2020 film) =

- Official poster
- Directed by: Greg Barker
- Written by: Craig Borten
- Produced by: Wagner Moura; Brent Travers; Daniel Dreifuss
- Starring: Wagner Moura; Ana de Armas; Garret Dillahunt; Clemens Schick; Will Dalton; Bradley Whitford; Brían F. O'Byrne
- Cinematography: Adrian Teijido
- Edited by: Claudia Castello
- Music by: Fernando Velázquez
- Production companies: Black Rabbit Media; Anima Pictures; Itapoan
- Distributed by: Netflix
- Release dates: January 28, 2020 (Sundance); April 17, 2020 (United States)
- Running time: 118 minutes
- Country: United States
- Language: English

Sergio is a 2020 American biographical drama film about the United Nations diplomat Sérgio Vieira de Mello. The film was directed by Greg Barker, from a screenplay written by Craig Borten. It stars Wagner Moura, Ana de Armas, Garret Dillahunt, Clemens Schick, Will Dalton, Bradley Whitford and Brían F. O'Byrne.

The film had its world premiere at the Sundance Film Festival on January 28, 2020. It was released on April 17, 2020, by Netflix.

== Plot ==
In 2003, United Nations' Special Representative in Iraq, Sérgio Vieira de Mello, is a victim of a terrorist suicide truck bombing and becomes trapped in the collapsed portion of the former hotel used as the UN's Iraq headquarters where he was working in Baghdad.

Three months earlier, de Mello is unhappily married. He decides to leave his wife for is girlfriend and co-worker Carolina (Ana de Armas). Against her advice, he decides to go to Baghdad after the 2003 invasion of Iraq in order to help Iraqis achieve independence and negotiate the withdrawal of American troops. He clashes with American diplomat Paul Bremer, and opposes the U.S. occupation of Iraq. He insists on not having U.S. guards at the UN's base camp in order to separate themselves from the U.S. occupiers.

De Mello is killed by a terrorist attack on the UN base camp. Later, the U.S. pulls out of Iraq, leading to a long civil war. De Mello's gravely injured colleague Gil (Brian F. O'Byrne) survives despite having both legs amputated, and Carolina returns to her justice work in Rio.

== Cast ==
- Wagner Moura as Sérgio Vieira de Mello, Special Representative of the UN Secretary-General to Iraq
- Ana de Armas as Carolina Larriera, U.N. economic consultant and Sérgio's girlfriend
- Garret Dillahunt as US Army First Sergeant William von Zehle, a soldier of the Civil Affairs Battalion
- Brían F. O'Byrne as Gil Loescher, Sérgio's deputy and long time associate
- Will Dalton as Staff Sergeant Andre Valentine, a medic of the Army Reserve
- Clemens Schick as Gaby Pichon, Sérgio's bodyguard
- Bradley Whitford as Paul Bremer, Administrator of the Coalition Provisional Authority in Iraq
- Pedro Hossi as Xanana Gusmão, leader of the East Timorese Independence movement
- Vithaya Pansringarm as Abdurrahman Wahid, President of Indonesia
- Sahajak Boonthanakit as Ieng Sary, leader of the Khmer Rouge
- Alice Assef as Mieke Bos, U.N. Executive Assistant
- Sameera Asir as Nadia Younes, Chief of Staff for Vieira de Mello

== Production ==
In July 2018, Wagner Moura, Ana de Armas, Garret Dillahunt, Brían F. O'Byrne, Will Dalton and Clemens Schick joined the cast of the film, with Greg Barker directing from a screenplay by Craig Borten, with Netflix distributing. In October 2018, Bradley Whitford joined the cast of the film.

Principal photography began in August 2018.

== Release ==
The film had its world premiere at the Sundance Film Festival on January 28, 2020. It was released on April 17, 2020.

== Critical reception ==
Sergio holds a 45% approval rating on review aggregator website Rotten Tomatoes, based on 19 reviews, with a weighted average of 5.55/10. The website's critics consensus reads: "While the real-life story that inspired Sergio is certainly worthy of a biopic, its misguided approach to its noble subject adds up to a disappointingly shallow drama." On Metacritic, the film holds a rating of 53 out of 100, based on 15 critics, indicating "mixed or average reviews".
