= Jason Farnham =

Jason Farnham (born 1975) is an American composer, performer, and record producer. He is best known for composing music for the Dr. Oz show (2009-2010 TV season), his world peace song and its YouTube video, "Love Around The World", and his contemporary integration of classical and electronic music. He is a member of the ASCAP Performing Rights Organization as both a writer and publisher. He currently resides in Sonoma County.

== Early years ==
Farnham was born in Brooklyn, New York. After many moves, in 1985 his family settled in Canton, Ohio. He began playing the piano at the age of four. He attended Perry High School in Massillon, Ohio, and graduated from Ohio University with a B.S. in Communications (Audio Production) and a double minor in Music and Spanish. He began writing his own music while attending Ohio University.

== Musical career ==
He licensed "First Man On Mars" to the 4Frontiers Corporation. His song, "Spin" was featured on the Montel Williams Music Fest 2006 compilation album. "Morning Coffee" was later featured on the Filter Magazine In-Flight Channel on American Airlines in 2009. "Rock Star" was subsequently licensed for use in the feature films, Bobby Khan's Ticket to Hollywood (2011), and American High School (2009).

His piece "Winter in L.A." from the album, was featured during the credits of a nationally distributed informative medical video, Amyloidosis Awareness (2009).

In January 2009, Farnham produced and recorded his fourth album, Kimono, a fusion of Japanese traditional and modern music, in conjunction with the Kimono As Art: The Landscapes of Itchiku Kubota traveling art exhibit from Japan. The exhibition of forty oversized landscape kimono visited the United States for only the second time, since its 1995 exhibition at the Smithsonian Institution in Washington, D.C. Farnham was featured in Kent State University's Encompass magazine and invited to perform for the exhibit as Artist-in-Residence at the Canton Cultural Center for the Arts in his hometown of Canton, Ohio. In the summer, he composed and produced eight tracks for the Dr. Oz show on ABC, one of which became the beginning theme of each episode for the 2009–2010 season. In October, Farnham produced his world peace song and YouTube video, "Love Around The World", which featured 15 people from different countries verbalizing the phrase "love around the world" in their native languages. The song was published by UEM Limited and featured in The Best of African Music (One World One Love Edition) (2010) compilation album, released by Universoul Vibes Records. The following January, Farnham was interviewed in a feature story about the song by Good Morning Cleveland News Channel 5 WEWS/ABC. In the winter of 2009, he recorded his instrumental album Christmas, a CD of creative interpretations of traditional holiday melodies. His rendition of "Silent Night" was later featured in the ChildFund International "Silent Night" television commercial (2011).

In 2010, Farnham produced his fifth album, Baby, a hybrid of ambient and new age music. In the fall, he composed the music and lyrics for the Fox Movie Classics commercial: "Office Space: The Musical". Farnham also received an honorable mention placement in the Song of the Year Songwriting Competition for his original song, "Finally (Top of the World)".

In early 2011, Farnham scored the Purpose Pictures production, You Are What You Eat, which won the Platinum Remi Award for Best Comedic Short (2011). at WorldFest Houston International Film Festival. Cinephonix Music Library in London, England, then commissioned Farnham to write exclusive music tracks for placement in film and television in Western Europe. In late 2011, Farnham released his sixth album, Special Times, a re-release of the 2005 instrumental piano album of the same title, but with modifications and the addition of new music. The album was accepted by both Pandora Internet Radio, and Whisperings Solo Piano Radio Shortly thereafter, his piece "Soundtrack for Ballet" from the album was included in the Tamara Lackey Signature Series on the Triple Scoop Music music library website Farnham also joined the Audiosparx music library and achieved the status of "permanently featured artist".

In early 2012, Farnham composed music for the television / web series Goon by Brotherhood Pictures. He also scored The Brick People, a documentary by Mike Kirsch that chronicled the story of Mexican immigrants who worked at Simon's Brickyard in Los Angeles in the early 20th century.

From 2013-2018, Farnham composed instrumental tracks for various music production libraries in a variety of genres.

In the summer of 2020, he released a new version of his world peace song "Love Around The World" to commemorate the 10-year anniversary of the track’s release. Later that year, his adaptation of "We Wish You A Merry Christmas" was featured in the 2020 Hulu original film Happiest Season.

In September 2021 Farnham released a cover of "Hallelujah" by Leonard Cohen, as a tribute to the 20th anniversary of 9/11.

In the winter of 2021 and throughout 2022 he has been recording and releasing a string of new indie rock singles of both covers and originals.

=== Live performances ===
As a live performing artist, Farnham was a member of three non profit membership organizations, which facilitated professional interaction between performing arts presenters and performing artists: Arts Northwest Ohio Arts Presenters Network (OAPN), and Montana Performing Arts Consortium (MPAC). He was selected to perform an official Juried Showcase at the 2011 Arts Northwest Booking Conference Past concerts have included performances in: Ohio (2011), Oregon (2011) Alaska (2011), Nevada (2010), and Idaho (2010).
