= Paszkiewicz =

The House of Paszkiewicz is a Polish noble family, of Lithuanian- Belarusian origin. The Polish-language surname originates from Paskevich, a Belarusian surname, which ultimately comes from the East Slav personal name Pashka, a diminutive of Pavel (Paul). The ending -kiewicz indicates the Belarusian language influence.

Notable people with this surname include:

- Gustaw Paszkiewicz (1892–1955), Polish military officer
- Kazimierz Paszkiewicz (1935–1980), Polish pentathlete
- Ludwik Witold Paszkiewicz (1907–1940), Polish fighter pilot
- Romuald Paszkiewicz (1941–2003), Polish volleyball player
- Zbigniew Paszkiewicz (1931–2020), Polish political activist, statesman

== Coat of Arms ==
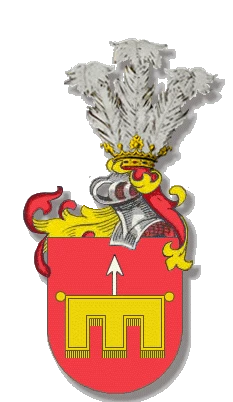
The Radwan coat of arms used by the Paszkiewicz family is distinguished by a red field, a white arrow on a golden church banner, and three ostrich feathers above a jewel on the helmet of a crown.

The Paszkiewicz family used the Radwan coat of arms. While the coat of arms has been used by other Polish noble families from as early as 1021, the Paszkiewicz family only began using the coat of arms since the Battle of Grunwald, fought on 15 July 1410 during the Polish- Lithuanian- Teutonic War. The family is known to be linked to the white arrow variant of the coat of arms.

== See also ==
- Paskevich for other variants
