= William Dalton =

William Dalton may refer to:

- William Dalton (author) (1821–1875), English author
- William M. Dalton (1866–1894), Old West outlaw, co-leader of the Wild Bunch gang
- Bill Dalton (footballer) (1876–1955), Australian rules footballer
- William Julian Dalton (1883–1941), American silent film actor, better known as Julian Eltinge
- William S. Dalton, current President and CEO of the H. Lee Moffitt Cancer Center and Research Institute.
- Will Dalton, lacrosse player
- William Dalton (Lucky Luke), fictional character from Lucky Luke
- Bill Dalton, the writer of the Indonesia Handbook
- William Boyd Dalton (1870–1946), Irish international footballer
