= Canal Hotel bombing =

2003 terror attack against the UN in Baghdad, Iraq

Coordinates: 33°20′01″N 44°28′02″E

- Part of Iraqi insurgency (2003–2006)
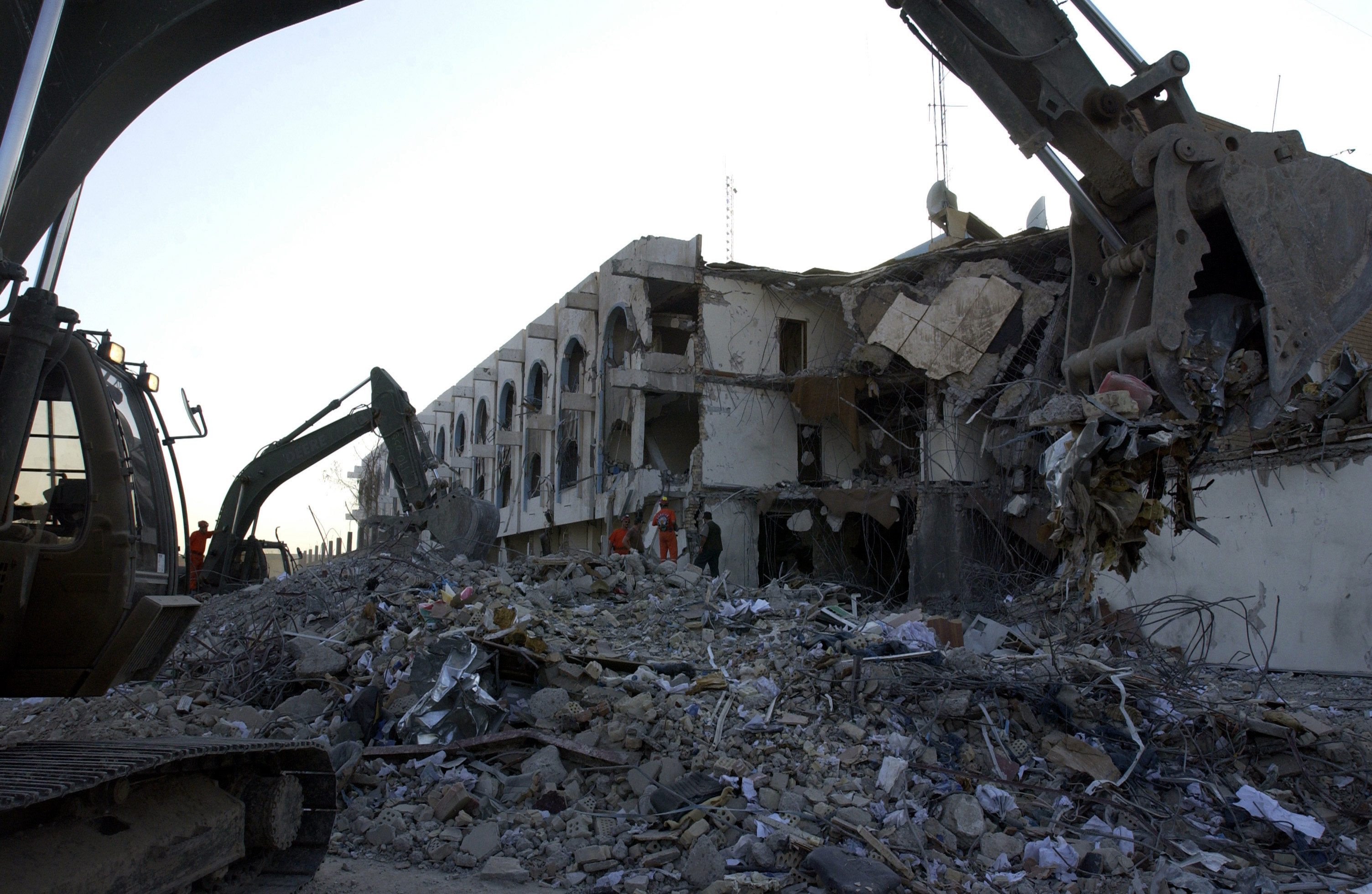
- Location: Baghdad, Iraq
- Date: 19 August 2003; 16:28 – (GMT +3)
- Target: United Nations headquarters
- Attack type: Truck bomb
- Deaths: 23
- Injuries: 100+
- Perpetrator: Jama'at al-Tawhid wal-Jihad
- Motive: Recognition of the occupation of Iraq, and Israel, United Nations Security Council Resolution 1386 and inaction in the wars in Bosnia, Chechnya, and Kashmir; Opposition to the independence of East Timor

The Canal Hotel bombing was a suicide truck bombing in Baghdad, Iraq, during the afternoon of 19 August 2003. It killed 23 people, including the United Nations' (UN) Special Representative in Iraq Sérgio Vieira de Mello, and wounded over 100, including human rights lawyer and political activist Amin Mekki Medani. The attack targeted the United Nations Assistance Mission in Iraq created just five days earlier. (Note: The United Nations had used the hotel as its headquarters in Iraq since the early 1990s.) The attack resulted in the withdrawal within weeks of most of the 600 UN staff members from Iraq. These events were to have a profound and lasting impact on the UN's security practices globally.

The attack was followed by a suicide car bomb attack on 22 September 2003 near UN headquarters in Baghdad, killing a security guard and wounding 19 people.

Abu Musab al-Zarqawi, the leader of terrorist organization Jama'at al-Tawhid wal-Jihad, claimed responsibility in April 2004 for the 19 August blast.

== Bombing ==
In his book The Prince of the Marshes, British politician and writer Rory Stewart recounts his experiences at the Canal Hotel on the day of the bombing.

I had wandered past the security point without anyone attempting to search me or ask my business. The Iraqis coming in and out of the compound were good-humored. I had said to my friend that things seemed pretty relaxed. She had replied that the special representative was proud that Iraqis could approach the UN building – unlike in the Green Zone, whose barriers were a half mile from the main offices.

... I went to the canteen, where I sat from ten until two in the afternoon, talking to local NGO staff who came in to eat and use the Internet. I particularly liked a Tunisian security advisor who had served in the Balkans and was worried about terrorists targeting the UN.

I left at two, intending to return later in the afternoon to use the Internet. But when I came back at 4:30, a thick column of smoke was rising from either end of the building, families were screaming and pushing at a cordon of U.S. soldiers, and the woman who had served me my salad in the cafeteria was running toward us. In my brief time away from the building, a suicide bomber had driven his truck up beneath De Mello's office window.

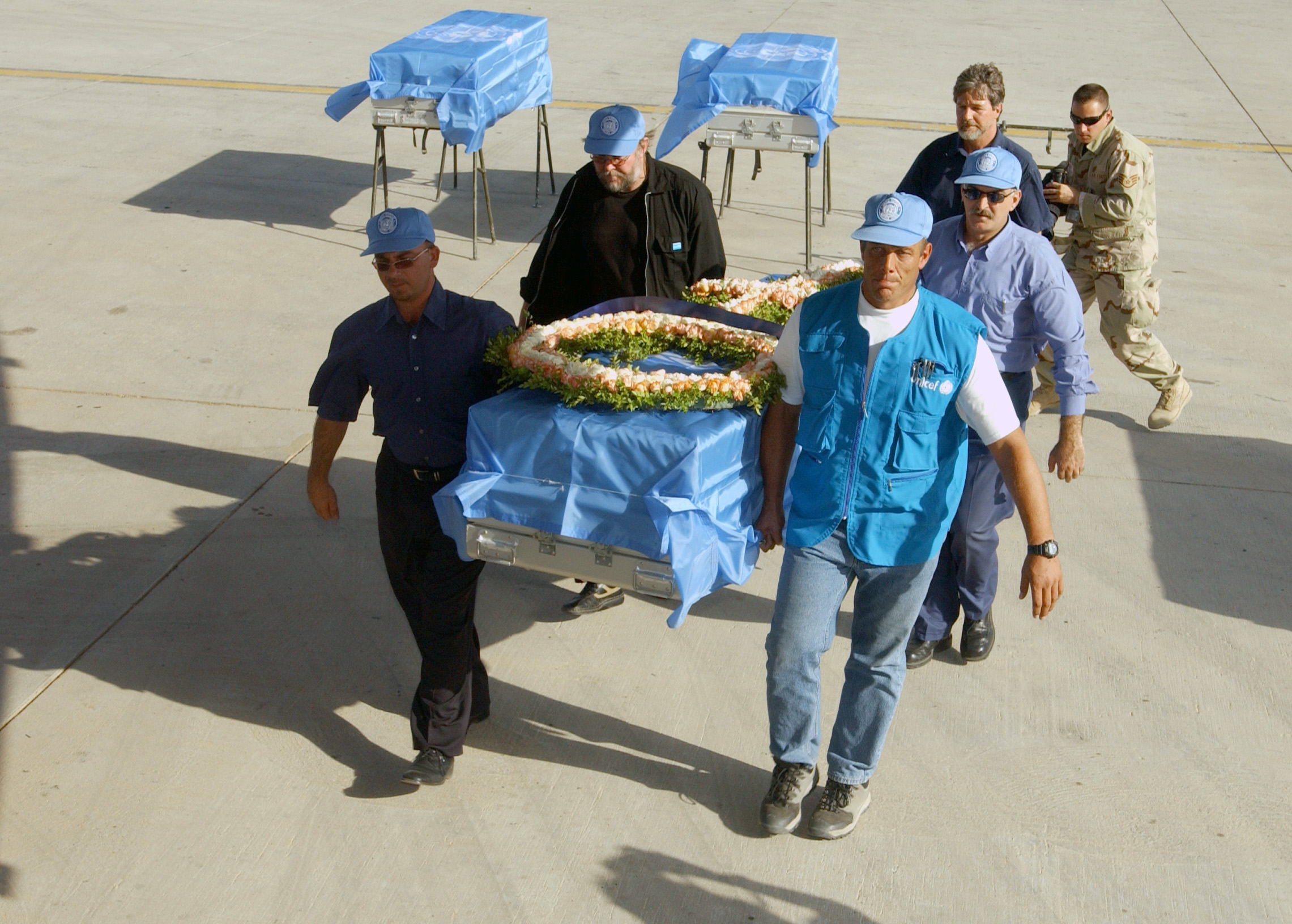
United Nations members prepare to load flag-draped metal transfer cases carrying the remains of bombing victims from the UN Office of Humanitarian Coordinator for Iraq

The explosion occurred while Martin Barber, director of the UN's Mine Action Service (UNMAS), was holding a press conference. The explosion damaged a spinal cord treatment center at the hospital next door and a U.S. Army Civil-Military Operations Centre located at the rear of the Canal Hotel, and the resulting shockwave was felt over a mile away.

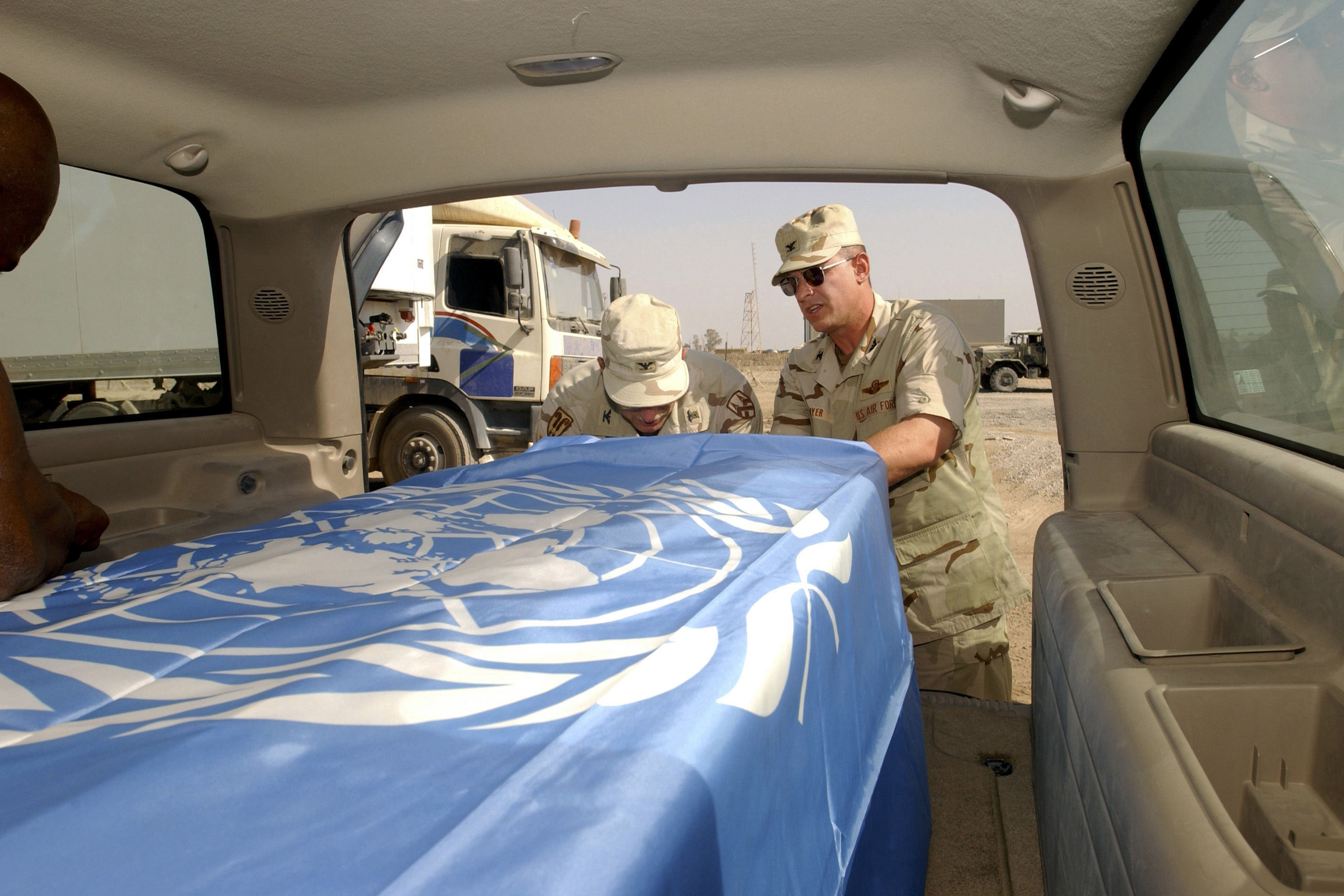
U.S. officers secure a United Nations flag over the transfer case of Sérgio Vieira de Mello, prior to a memorial service at the Baghdad International Airport.

The blast was caused by a suicide bomber driving a truck bomb. The vehicle has been identified as a large 2002 flatbed Kamaz (manufactured in Eastern Europe and part of the former Iraqi establishment's fleet). Investigators in Iraq suspected the bomb was made from old munitions, including a single 500-pound aerial bomb, from Iraq's pre-war arsenal.

The United Nations Office for the Coordination of Humanitarian Affairs Humanitarian Information Centre (HIC) for Iraq (UNOHCI) was located directly beneath the office of Sérgio Vieira de Mello, the UN High Commissioner for Human Rights, and suffered a direct hit. Of the eight staff and one visitor in the office at the time, seven were killed instantly, but de Mello and Gil Loescher were critically wounded and trapped in debris under the collapsed portion of the building. An American soldier, First Sergeant William von Zehle, crawled down through the collapsed building and worked to extricate the two men. He was joined later by another American soldier, Staff Sergeant Andre Valentine. The two men spent the next three hours trying to extricate the two survivors without benefit of any rescue equipment. Loescher was rescued after having his crushed legs amputated by the soldiers, but Vieira de Mello died before he could be removed.

According to Abu Musab al-Zarqawi, Vieira de Mello was specifically targeted in the blast. The reason given by al-Zarqawi for targeting Vieira de Mello was that he had helped East Timor become an independent state (see the Indonesian occupation of East Timor). Zarqawi said that Vieira de Mello had participated in the unlawful removal of territory from the Islamic caliphate and was therefore a thief and a criminal.

== Second bomb ==
The bombing was followed on September 22, 2003, by another car bomb outside the Canal Hotel. The blast killed the bomber and an Iraqi policeman and wounded 19 others, including UN workers. The second attack led to the withdrawal of some 600 UN international staff from Baghdad, along with employees of other aid agencies. In August 2004, de Mello's replacement, Ashraf Qazi, arrived in Baghdad along with a small number of staff.

== List of victims ==
Name	Age	Nationality	Position
Sérgio Vieira de Mello	55	Brazil	Special Representative of the UN Secretary-General to Iraq
Nadia Younes	57	Egypt	Chief of Staff for Vieira de Mello
Fiona Watson	35	United Kingdom	Member of Vieira de Mello's staff, political affairs officer
Jean-Sélim Kanaan	33	Egypt; Italy; France	Member of Vieira de Mello's staff, political officer
Richard Hooper	40	United States	Senior advisor to the UN Under-Secretary-General for the Department of Political Affairs
Manuel Martín-Oar	56	Spain	Naval captain, assistant to the Spanish special ambassador to Iraq
Christopher Klein-Beekman	32	Canada	UN Children's Fund's program coordinator
Reham Al-Farra	29	Jordan	Department of Public Information, Deputy Spokesperson
Martha Teas	47	United States	UNOHCI Manager
Leen Assad Al-Qadi	32	Iraq	UNOHCI Information Assistant
Ranillo Buenaventura	47	Philippines	UNOHCI Secretary for Vieira de Mello
Reza Hosseini	43	Iran	UNOHCI Humanitarian affairs officer
Ihsan Taha Husein	26	Iraq	UNOHCI Driver
Sati Jawad Al-Sabti	59	Iraq	WFP Accounts Officer
Basim Mahmoud Utaiwi	40	Iraq	UNOHCI Security guard
Raid Shaker Mustafa Al-Mahdawi	32	Iraq	United Nations Monitoring, Verification and Inspection Commission (UNMOVIC)
Gillian Clark	47	Canada	Christian Children's Fund
Arthur Helton	54	United States	Director of peace and conflict studies at the U.S. Council on Foreign Relations
Alya Ahmad Souza	54	Iraq	World Bank
Khidir Saleem Sahir		Iraq	Civilian
Ali Mohammed Hindi		Iraq	Civilian
Saad Hermis Abona	33	Iraq	Working for a UN subcontractor (Canal Hotel cafeteria worker)
Omar Kahtan Mohamed Al-Orfali	34	Iraq	Driver/interpreter, Christian Children's Fund
Emaad Ahmed Salman al-Jobody	45	Iraq	Electrician

Marilyn Manuel, a member of Vieira de Mello's staff from the Philippines, was originally listed as missing and presumed dead in the collapsed section of the building. However, she had been evacuated to an Iraqi hospital which did not notify the UN of her presence. Her survival was confirmed four days later.

After the 2003 invasion of Iraq American Marines occupied the building

== Suspects ==
We destroyed the U.N. building, the protectors of Jews, the friends of the oppressors and aggressors. The U.N. has recognized the Americans as the masters of Iraq. Before that, they gave Palestine as a gift to the Jews so they can rape the land and humiliate our people. Do not forget Bosnia, Kashmir, Afghanistan and Chechnya.

— Abu Musab al-Zarqawi, in a tv program of FRONTLINE, 21 February 2006.

In an audiotape, published 6 April 2004 on a website and "probably authentic," according to the CIA, Abu Musab al-Zarqawi claimed credit for a number of attacks, including the 19 August 2003 bombing on U.N. quarters in Baghdad. By December 2004, The Jamestown Foundation considered al-Zarqawi and his Jama'at al-Tawhid wal-Jihad responsible for the attack.

In January 2005, a top bombmaker for al-Zarqawi's group, Abu Omar al-Kurdi, was captured by the coalition and claimed his associates made the bomb used in the attack. On 16 December 2005, Iraqi authorities issued an arrest warrant for Mullah Halgurd al-Khabir, a commander of Ansar al-Sunna, in connection with the attack.

The Italian newspaper Corriere della Sera identified the suicide bomber as Algerian national Fahdal Nassim. Other suspects included Baathists, militant Sunni and Shiite groups, organized crime, and tribal elements. Blame was initially thought to lie with Ansar al-Islam, which was thought at the time to be al-Zarqawi's group. An otherwise unknown group called the "Armed Vanguards of the Second Mohammed Army" claimed they were responsible for the attack.

Awraz Abd Aziz Mahmoud Sa'eed, known as al-Kurdi, confessed to helping plan the attack for al-Zarqawi. Al-Kurdi was captured by U.S. forces in 2005, judged and sentenced to death by an Iraqi court, and executed by hanging on 3 July 2007.

== Responses ==
The suicide bombing of the United Nations in Baghdad drew overwhelming condemnation. Kofi Annan, then-United Nations Secretary-General, commented that the bombing would not stop the organization's efforts to rebuild Iraq, and said: "Nothing can excuse this act of unprovoked and murderous violence against men and women who went to Iraq for one purpose only: to help the Iraqi people recover their independence and sovereignty, and to rebuild their country as fast as possible, under leaders of their own choosing."

== World Humanitarian Day ==
On 11 December 2008, the United Nations General Assembly adopted Resolution A/63/139 on "Strengthening of the Coordination of Emergency Assistance of the United Nations," which, among other declarations, designated 19 August as World Humanitarian Day to recognize all humanitarian and United Nations and associated personnel who have worked in the promotion of the humanitarian cause and those who have lost their lives while doing so.

== Films ==
In 2004, Gil Loescher's daughter, documentary filmmaker Margaret Loescher, made a critically acclaimed film about her father's experiences called Pulled from the Rubble.

A documentary produced in 2009 and a movie released in 2020, both titled Sergio, deal with the life of Sergio Vieira de Mello and the Canal Hotel bombing.

== See also ==
- Attacks on humanitarian workers
