= Fiona Watson =

Scottish political affairs officer

Fiona Watson (1968 – 19 August 2003) was a Scottish political affairs officer working in Sérgio Vieira de Mello's office who was killed along with other members of United Nations Assistance Mission in Iraq staff in the Canal Hotel bombing in Baghdad, on the afternoon of 19 August 2003.

== Biography ==
Watson received a first class honours degree from Heriot-Watt University in Edinburgh, and an M.Phil. in International Relations and Ballistic Studies from the University of Cambridge, where she was part of Darwin College.

Prior to joining the UN, Watson worked with the European Commission and for a period with the Organization for Security and Co-operation in Europe. During her career with the UN, Watson had been involved in many of the world's hot spots, including Bosnia and Kosovo: Watson worked in the United Nations Interim Administration Mission in Kosovo to Bernard Kouchner the UN's special representative to Kosovo. An experienced linguist, she worked with the UN for almost four years as a political analyst. At the time of her death she was political affairs officer on the staff of Special Representative of the Secretary-General Sérgio Vieira de Mello.

Watson's family and friends set up the Fiona Watson Memorial Fund to provide bursaries for final year students at her first university, Heriot-Watt, to enable them to spend a year with the UN or a similar international organisation.

== See also ==
- Attacks on humanitarian workers
