= Abu Omar al-Kurdi =

Islamist bomb-maker (1968–2007

أبو عمر الكردي
- Born: 1968; Iraq
- Died: 2007 (aged 38–39); Baghdad
- Other name: Abu Omar al-Kurdi
- Occupation: IEd–maker
- Organization: Jama'at al-Tawhid wal-Jihad
- Status: Executed in 2007
- Criminal charges: Terrorism
- Penalty: Execution

Details
- Span of crimes: 2003–2005
- Date apprehended: 2005

Sami Mohammad Ali Said Jaff (1968–2007), also known as Abu Omar al-Kurdi, was a Kurdish bomb-maker for Abu Musab al-Zarqawi.

== Biography ==
Abu Omar al-Kurdi was an ethnic Kurd from the Jaff tribe. He was a veteran of Jihad in Afghanistan, where he allegedly mastered his bomb-making skills. He returned to Iraq in 2003 where he met Zarqawi and would later become his top bomb-maker. Allegedly, al-Kurdi's bomb-making was made possible by using hundreds of rockets and explosives stolen from Iraqi military warehouses by another member, Ammar az-Zubaidi, early in the 2003 invasion of Iraq. By the time he was arrested on 15 January 2005, he was already responsible for 75 percent of the car bomb attacks in Iraq since August 2003 but only confessed to 32 of them. These included the attack on the Jordanian embassy, the Canal Hotel bombing, the Imam Ali mosque bombing, the attack on the Italian base in Nasiriyya and the attack that killed Ezzedine Salim. The authorities said that al-Kurdi planned attacks on election polling stations during the 30 January 2005 parliamentary elections. al-Kurdi was executed in Baghdad in 2007.

== See also ==
- Mullah Shwan Kurdi
