= Gillian Clark (aid worker) =

Gillian M. Clark
- Born: 1956; Toronto, Canada
- Died: August 19, 2003 (aged 46-47); Baghdad, Iraq
- Education: University of Guelph
- Occupation: Aid worker

Gillian M. Clark (1956 – August 19, 2003) was a Canadian aid worker who was killed in the Canal Hotel bombing in Iraq. Ms. Clark was working for the Christian Children's Fund (CCF) at the time.

== Education ==
She was a graduate of the University of Guelph.

== Career ==
Gill was committed to aid work, in 1988 she was sent to Papua New Guinea with CUSO, she also worked for OXFAM and International Rescue Committee amongst others, always working in the more difficult parts of the world and often focusing her work on children and children's rights. She joined Save the Children UK and in the mid-'90s worked in North Iraq. For her work she visited many complex emergencies, like Sri Lanka, Sierra Leone, Indonesia and Afghanistan.

The CCF hired Clark in January 2003 to manage its efforts to help Iraqi children as war loomed, but she was not able to enter the country until May 2003. Part of her work was to assess the problems faced by Iraqis, evaluating how children were faring psychologically and determining humanitarian needs.

On her death, CCF spokeswoman Ellie Whinnery told in an interview:

She strongly believes in what she does for children. She was very anxious to go to Iraq again, because she had been there before.
