= Mullah Shwan =

Kurdish ISIS senior member (1986–2015)

- مەلا شوان
- Born: Shwan Salah Mohammad; 1986; Erbil
- Died: July 28, 2015 (aged 29-30 years); Hawija
- Cause of death: Airstrike
- Other name: Abu Harun al-Kurdi
- Occupations: Cleric and Islamic State militant
- Years active: 2014-2015
- Children: 3 daughters

Shwan Salah Mohammad, (Kurdish: شوان سەڵاح محەممەد) also known as Mullah Shwan (مەلا شوان) (1986 – July 28, 2015) was a Kurdish senior member of the Islamic State, who was among the first to join the group during its early stages.

== Life ==
Mullah Shwan's parents are from a small village called Zebarok, near Shaqlawa. They later moved to Erbil, where Mullah Shwan was born in 1986 in Erbil. He did not live in the village and lived his entire life in the city. He studied until the 9th grade before dropping out. He married in 2006. He has two sisters and two brothers. Mullah Shwan's grandfather was a Peshmerga of the First Iraqi–Kurdish War. His uncle also fought in it and died. Two of his other uncles were wounded in the fight against ISIS. One of his brothers is a Peshmerga. Mullah Shwan was a preacher at Mam Jaafar Mosque in Daratu township, near Erbil.

=== Joining ISIS ===
In November 2014, he travelled to Kirkuk with his family and daughters, Hana and Hala, along with two other friends, to join ISIS.

Mullah Shwan appeared in many ISIS propaganda videos. He was basically the Kurdish mascot for ISIS. On July 28, 2015, the KRG Security Council announced that in a secret operation with American forces, they were able to locate Mullah Shwan after spying on his house in Hawija for several days. They killed him by bombing a vehicle full of ISIS fighters which he was also riding in. After the killing of Mullah Shwan, the fate of his family remains unknown.

== See also ==
- Abu Omar al-Kurdi
- Jihadi John
