= Jean-Sélim Kanaan =

Egyptian-Italian-French diplomat (1970–2003)

- Born: July 28, 1970; Rome, Italy
- Died: August 19, 2003 (aged 33); Baghdad, Iraq

Jean-Sélim Kanaan (July 28, 1970 – August 19, 2003) was a United Nations diplomat, Egyptian, Italian and French national, who was killed in the Canal Hotel bombing in Baghdad, Iraq, along with Sérgio Vieira de Mello and other members of his staff. Born in Rome, Italy, he was the son of an Egyptian UN diplomat, and he spoke seven languages.

== Biography ==
Kanaan devoted his life to humanitarian relief operations from the age of 23 until his death. In 1996 he graduated from Harvard Kennedy School with a Master of Public Policy, after graduating in business with an MBA Institute in Paris in 1992. Before that, he served in Mogadishu, Somalia, in 1992, and the following year, as a relief coordinator for Médecins du Monde in central Bosnia. In his first assignment with the UN from 1996 to 1998, he was employed by the UNOPS and served with the UN’s director of peacekeeping operations in Bosnia as the Assistant Programme Coordinator, and, from 1999 to 2000, in the UN Interim Administration Mission in Kosovo as an assistant to Bernard Kouchner, the UN's special representative to Kosovo. Following Kosovo, and until his mission in Iraq (2003), Kanaan worked with UNOSAT at the UN Headquarters in New York City where he was managing policy questions promoting the use of GIS and other novel technologies for peacekeeping operations. In 2002, he published a book, Ma guerre à L’indifference, (English: My war against indifference), with a preface written by Christine Ockrent. He climbed Mount Kilimanjaro and was an aviator.

Kanaan left behind his wife, Laura Dolci-Kanaan, and his three-week-old baby, Mattias-Sélim Kanaan. He was buried in a Roman Catholic cemetery in Cairo, Egypt: "Jean Sélim, martire della pace e dell'umanesimo".

Kanaan was awarded the French Legion of Honour posthumously for his work in "helping the world's weak and oppressed".

== See also ==
- Attacks on humanitarian workers
