= World Humanitarian Day =

International day celebrating lives lost in humanitarian causes

- Also called: WHD
- Observed by: UN Members
- Date: 19 August
- Next time: 19 August 2026
- Frequency: Annual
- First time: 19 August 2009

World Humanitarian Day is an international day dedicated to recognize humanitarian personnel and those who have died working for humanitarian causes. It was designated by the United Nations General Assembly as part of a Swedish-sponsored General Assembly Resolution on "Strengthening of the Coordination of Emergency Assistance of the United Nations," and designated 19 August as World Humanitarian Day for the purpose of "increasing public awareness about humanitarian assistance activities worldwide and the importance of international cooperation in this regard, as well as to honour all humanitarian and United Nations and associated personnel who have worked in the promotion of the humanitarian cause and those who have lost their lives in the cause of duty."

It marks the day on which the then Special Representative of the Secretary-General to Iraq, Sérgio Vieira de Mello and 21 of his colleagues were killed in the bombing of the UN Headquarters in Baghdad.

== History ==
A national of Brazil, Sérgio Vieira de Mello was killed in the Canal Hotel bombing in Iraq along with 21 other members of his staff on 19 August 2003 while working as UN High Commissioner for Human Rights, with the rank of Under-Secretary-General, and United Nations Special Representative for Iraq. Before his death, he was considered a likely candidate for UN Secretary-General.

The Sérgio Vieira de Mello Foundation and his family worked with the Ambassadors of France, Switzerland, Japan, and Brazil to steer the draft Resolution through the General Assembly.

World Humanitarian Day was commemorated for the first time on 19 August 2009.

== See also ==
- Humanitarianism
- Office for the Coordination of Humanitarian Affairs
- International Day of Peace
- International Human Solidarity Day
- Human Rights Day
