= Christine Ockrent =

Belgian journalist

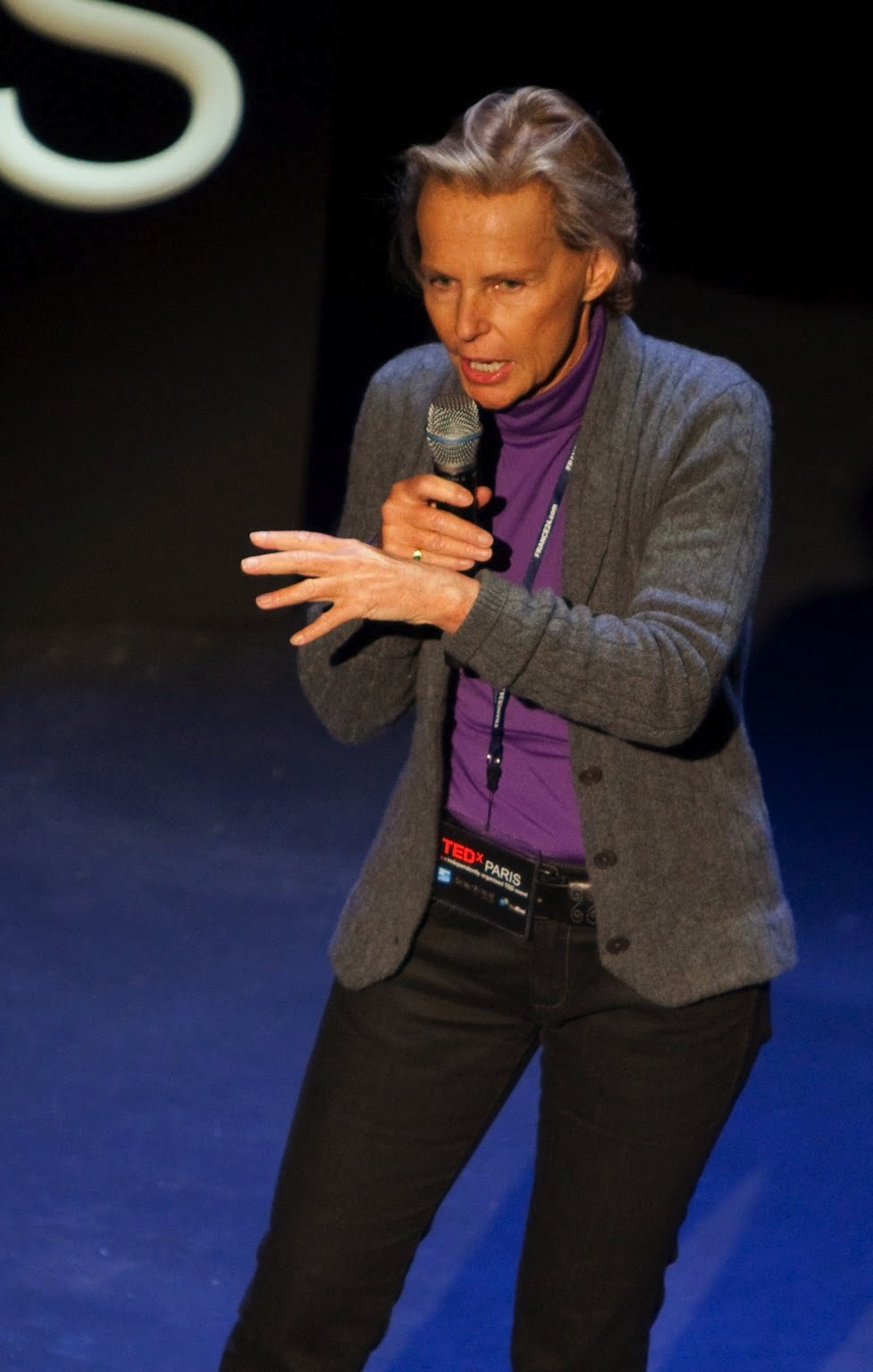
- Christine Ockrent in 2010
- Born: 24 April 1944 (age 82); Brussels, Belgium
- Occupation: Journalist
- Partner: Bernard Kouchner
- Children: 1

Christine Ockrent (born 24 April 1944) is a Belgian journalist whose career has principally centered on French television.

She interviewed Amir-Abbas Hoveyda, the former Iranian prime minister, in Qasr prison after the Islamic revolution in 1979. It was the last interview with Hoveyda before his execution.

== Early life ==
Ockrent was born in Brussels, Belgium, daughter of Belgian diplomat Roger Ockrent. She attended the Cours Hattemer, a private school in Paris. She graduated from the Institut d'Études Politiques de Paris (Sciences Po) in 1965.

== Career ==
She worked for the CBS news magazine, 60 Minutes, while in charge of morning news for Europe 1 in France. In 1981, she became the first female anchor of the 8 pm news on the Antenne 2 television channel. Afterwards, she worked for TF1 as anchor of the evening news at France 2; and since 1990 for France 3 as the host of different news magazines.

She was chief of the L'Express editorial office. For over a decade she presented France Europe Express, a TV show about European issues. She is a fervent supporter of a united Europe, signing the Soros letter for a federal answer to the crisis of the euro.

Ockrent held the number two post at the Société de l'audiovisuel extérieur de la France, until she was relieved in May 2011. She refused to resign, saying that she had had to endure "nine months of manoeuvres that have sullied my honour and reputation".

She is a former member of the Saint-Simon Foundation think-tank.

In 2002, Ockrent wrote the preface to Ma guerre à L'indifference (English: My war against indifference), a book by United Nations official Jean-Sélim Kanaan. She is the author of more than a dozen works including: La Double vie d'Hillary Clinton (The Double Life of Hillary Clinton), Robert Laffont (2001) Les Oligarques : le système Poutine (The Oligarchs, The Putin System), Robert Laffont (2014) Le Prince mystère de l'Arabie (The Mysterious Prince of Arabie). Mohammed Ben Salman, les mirages d'un pouvoir absolu, Robert Laffont (2018).

== Other activities ==
- Institute of Advanced Studies in National Defence (IHEDN), Member of the Scientific Council (since 2020)
- European Council on Foreign Relations (ECFR), Member

== Personal life ==
Ockrent is the life partner of Bernard Kouchner, a French politician and the former foreign minister, with whom she had a son, Alexandre, born 11 March 1986.
