= Gil Loescher =

American political scientist (1945–2020)

Gilburt Damian Loescher (7 March 1945 – 28 April 2020) was an American political scientist.

== Early life and education ==
He was raised in the San Francisco Bay Area and was a scholarship basketball player at Saint Mary's College of California. He earned his bachelor's degree in 1967 then earned a masters at Monterey Institute of International Studies in 1969 and a doctoral degree from the London School of Economics in 1975.

== Career ==
He joined the faculty of the University of Notre Dame in 1975. He taught international relations and peace studies and was a fellow of the Kroc Institute for International Peace Studies.

After retiring from Notre Dame, he served with the European Council on Refugees and Exiles, International Institute for Strategic Studies and openDemocracy. He was a visiting fellow at the Refugee Studies Centre at the University of Oxford since 2003.

He was a survivor of the Canal Hotel bombing in Baghdad. He was the only survivor of the meeting that was being held with United Nations' Special Representative in Iraq, Sérgio Vieira de Mello, at the time of the bombing.

== Death ==
He died on 28 April 2020 as a result of heart failure.
