= Arnaldo Fabris =

Italian ice hockey player

Personal information
- Nationality: Italian
- Born: 16 August 1916; Bologna, Kingdom of Italy
- Died: 15 August 2003 (aged 86); Monza, Italy

Sport
- Sport: Ice hockey

Arnaldo Fabris (16 August 1916 – 15 August 2003) was an Italian ice hockey player. He competed in the men's tournament at the 1948 Winter Olympics.
