= Herman van den Engel =

Dutch footballer

Personal information
- Full name: Hermanus Anthonius van den Engel
- Date of birth: 23 November 1918
- Place of birth: Delft, Netherlands
- Date of death: 27 August 2003 (aged 84)
- Place of death: Delft, Netherlands
- Position: Midfielder

Senior career*
Years	Team	Apps	(Gls)
1935-1949	DHC		
1950-1953	Feijenoord	50	(2)
1953-1955	Scheveningen		
1955-1956	SHS		

International career
1940	Netherlands	1	(1)
- * Club domestic league appearances and goals

Herman van den Engel (23 November 1918 – 27 August 2003) was a Dutch footballer.

Born in Delft, he played in one match for the Netherlands national football team in 1940, just a few weeks before the German invasion of the Netherlands. Van den Engel worked as a cigar wholesaler, according to his marriage certificate.

Between 1958 and 1959, van den Engel coached hometown club DSV Full Speed.
