= Fernand Voussure =

Belgian footballer

Personal information
- Date of birth: 24 July 1918
- Date of death: 16 August 2003 (aged 85)

International career
Years	Team	Apps	(Gls)
1944	Belgium	1	(0)

Fernand Voussure (24 July 1918 – 16 August 2003) was a Belgian footballer. He played in one match for the Belgium national football team in 1944.
