= Reham Al-Farra =

Palestinian diplomat and journalist

- رهام الفرا
- Born: 1974; Kuwait
- Died: 19 August 2003 (aged 28–29); Baghdad, Iraq
- Cause of death: Killed in the Canal Hotel bombing
- Education: Yarmouk University

Reham Al-Farra (Arabic: رهام الفرا; 1974–2003) was a Palestinian diplomat and journalist who was murdered in the Canal Hotel bombing in 2003. She had served as a Minister of Public Information and for the United Nations Office for the Coordination of Humanitarian Affairs.

== Early life and education ==
Al-Farra was born in Kuwait, and graduated from the Faculty of Mass Communications at Yarmouk University in Jordan.

== Career ==
Al-Farra worked as a journalist at the weekly newspaper Shihan and later became its editor. She was the youngest columnist in Jordan to write a daily column in Al-Arab Al-Yawm for four consecutive years.

In 2002, Al-Farra joined the United Nations Department of Public Information and was nominated later as an Arabic spokesperson for the UN operations in Iraq. She had also been active at the Center for Defending Freedom of Journalists.

== Death ==
Al-Farra was killed along with other United Nations staff members in the terrorist Canal Hotel bombing of the UN Headquarters in Baghdad, Iraq, on 19 August 2003.

== Honours ==
In September 2003, the UN Department of Public Information decided to rename its annual training programme for young journalists “The Reham Al-Farra Memorial Journalists' Fellowship Programme” in memory of her.

On 19 September 2003, UN Secretary-General Kofi Annan paid tribute to Al-Farra during a memorial ceremony for those killed in Baghdad: “You chose to work for the United Nations because you wanted to do something for others," Annan said. "You went to Iraq to make a contribution to the lives of your Arab brothers and sisters. It is their loss as much as ours that you were denied the chance to do that".
