= Nadia Younes =

Egyptian national

Nadia Younes (Arabic: نادية يونس; June 13, 1946 – August 19, 2003) was an Egyptian national who spent her entire career, for over 33 years, in the United Nations (UN) and the World Health Organization.

She was born in Cairo, Egypt, and earned a Master of Arts degree in political science and international relations from New York University, and a Bachelor of Arts degree in English literature from Cairo University. She spoke French, English and Arabic fluently.

== Career in the United Nations ==
Nadia Younes joined the United Nations in 1970. From 1974, she worked with the Department of Public Information in various capacities, initially as a press officer in both the English and French Sections. Later assignments included Information Officer for the World Conference of the Decade for Women; Information Office, Planning, Programme and Evaluation Unit; and Spokeswoman for the President of the Forty-Second Session of the General Assembly.

Younes served as Deputy Spokeswoman for the Secretary-General from March 1988 until January 1993, when she was appointed Director of the United Nations Information Centre in Rome. She subsequently moved back to New York City to assume the post of Director of the Media Division in the Department of Public Information.

She worked as United Nations Chief of Protocol from 1998. From July 1999 to January 2001, she worked in the field mission in Kosovo (UNMIK) where she was in charge of the information and communication office in the Cabinet of the Special Representative of the Secretary-General, Bernard Kouchner. Following her assignment in Kosovo, Younes returned to New York and resumed her functions as Chief of Protocol.

In August 2002, Younes was appointed as WHO’s Executive Director in charge of External Relations and Governing Bodies. Her position included responsibility for relations with WHO’s Member States, resource mobilization and WHO’s governing bodies.

In May 2003, she was seconded by WHO to act as Chief of Staff for the Special Representative of the UN Secretary General to Iraq, Sérgio Vieira de Mello, in Baghdad. Younes died from wounds sustained in the Canal Hotel bombing on August 19, 2003, along with de Mello and 21 other members of his office staff.

WHO's official tribute to her reads in part "...WHO mourns the loss of one of its most respected, effective and charismatic officials". The Reuters news agency referred to her as "witty" and "with a sharp sense of humor".

She was buried in Cairo, Egypt.

== See also ==
- Attacks on humanitarian workers
