= Les Bell (rugby league) =

Australian rugby league footballer

Personal information
- Full name: Les Bell
- Born: 11 January 1926 Gosford, New South Wales, Australia
- Died: 3 August 2003 (aged 77) Gosford, New South Wales, Australia

Playing information
- Position: Centre
Club
Years	Team	Pld	T	G	FG	P
1943–46	South Sydney	21	0	17	0	34
1947–49	Parramatta	14	0	27	0	54
	Total	35	0	44	0	88

Les Bell was an Australian rugby league footballer who played in the 1940s. He played for South Sydney and Parramatta as a centre. Bell was a foundation player for Parramatta and played in the club's first ever game.

== Early life ==
Bell was born and raised in Gosford on the New South Wales Central Coast. Bell played locally for Gosford in the country rugby league competition before signing with South Sydney.

== Playing career ==
Bell made his debut for Souths against North Sydney as a 17 year old in 1943. Bell played at Souths for 4 years but his time with the team was not very successful as they finished last in 1945 and 1946. In 1947, Bell joined newly admitted club Parramatta. On 12 April 1947, Parramatta played in their first ever game as a club against Newtown at Cumberland Oval. Parramatta went on to lose the match 34–12 with Bell kicking the club's first ever goals. At the end of 1947, Parramatta finished with their first wooden spoon after struggling all year managing to win only 3 matches. Bell played two further seasons with Parramatta and retired at the end of 1949.
