= Arthur Helton =

American lawyer

Arthur Helton (January 24, 1949 – August 19, 2003) was a lawyer, refugee advocate, teacher and author. He died in the 2003 Canal Hotel bombing while he was in Baghdad to assess humanitarian conditions in Iraq.

Helton graduated from Columbia College, Columbia University in New York City in 1971 and from New York University School of Law in 1976.

Helton joined the Lawyers Committee for Human Rights in New York City in 1982, and in his first year convinced a federal judge to release over 2,000 Haitian refugees by promising to find lawyers to represent the asylum seekers.

In 1994, Helton founded and then directed the Forced Migration Project at the Open Society Institute.

From 1999, Helton served as program director of peace and conflict studies and senior fellow for refugee studies and preventive action at the Council on Foreign Relations in New York City.

Helton's last book was The Price of Indifference - Refugees and Humanitarian Action in the New Century. The work was praised by Kofi Annan, who proclaimed it "...a welcome contribution to the debate on humanitarian action" It won praise from Kofi Annan as "highly original" and "ambitious". Kenneth Bacon, the president of Refugees International, called it "required reading". Human Right Watch lauded his "hard-nosed and persuasive advocacy". Helton was not just an analyst; he took action. The head of the Lawyers Committee, Michael Posner, said "...Arthur was legendarily hard working and tenacious....Refugees around the world have lost ...one of their leading lights."

Awards and fellowships have been created in his memory, including the Arthur Helton Global Human Rights Fellowship at NYU Law, the Arthur C. Helton Human Rights Award given by the American Immigration Lawyers Association, and the American Society of International Law's Arthur C. Helton Fellowship Program.

== Writings ==
Iraq: lurching toward recovery (by Arthur Helton and Gil Loescher)

The Price of Indifference: Refugees and Humanitarian Action in the New Century (2002)
