= Romuald Paszkiewicz =

Polish volleyball player (1941–2003)

Personal information
- Nationality: Polish
- Born: 7 July 1941 Vilnius, Lithuania
- Died: 25 August 2003 (aged 62) Brussels, Belgium

Sport
- Sport: Volleyball

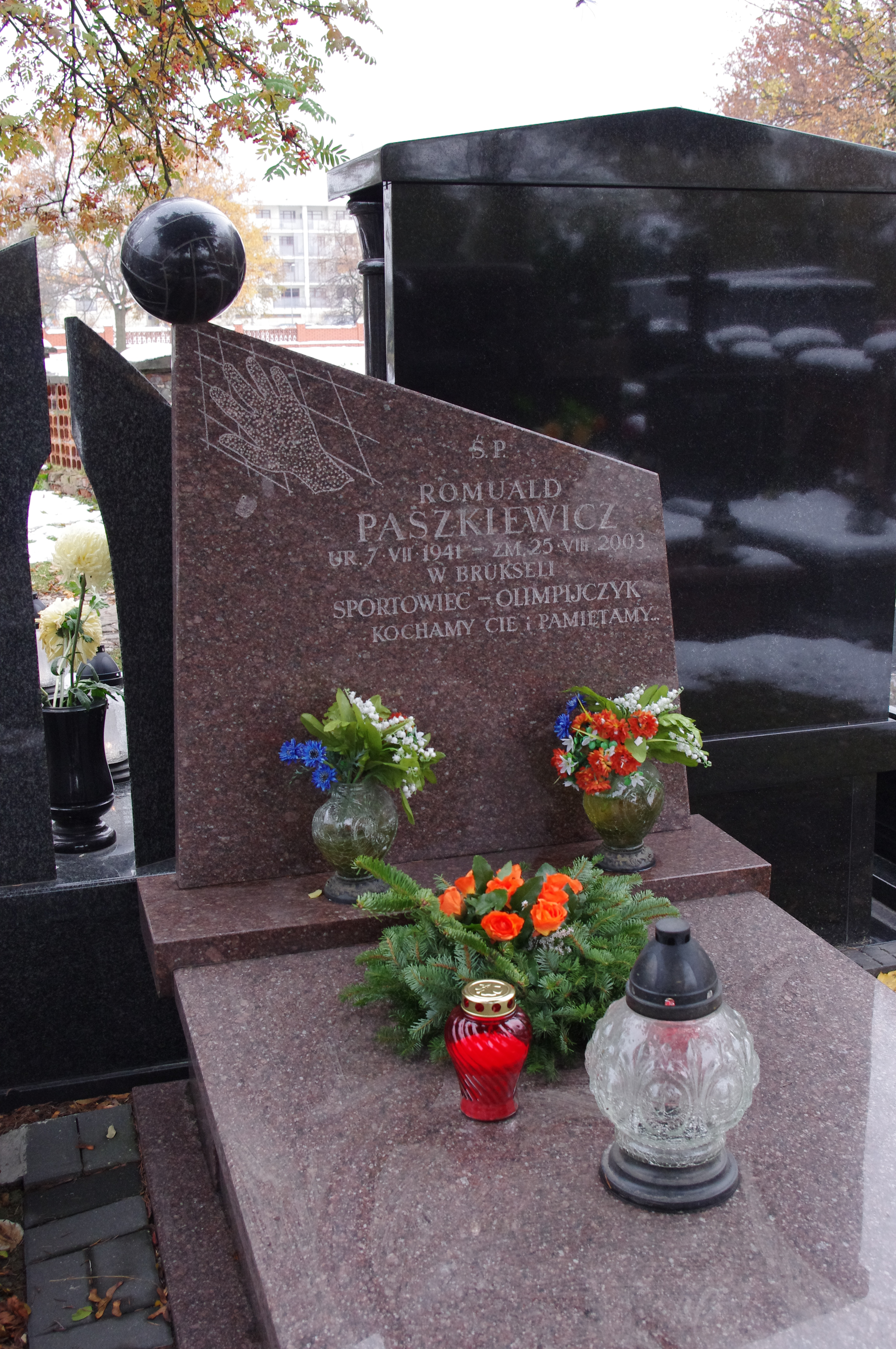
The grave of Romuald Paszkiewicz at the Wilanów Cemetery in Warsaw.

Romuald Paszkiewicz (7 July 1941 – 25 August 2003) was a Polish volleyball player. He competed in the men's tournament at the 1968 Summer Olympics.
