= Will Dalton =

Personal information
- Nationality: American
- Born: Queenstown, Maryland
- Height: 6 ft 4 in (193 cm)
- Weight: 270 lb (120 kg; 19 st 4 lb)

Sport
- Position: Transition
- Shoots: Right
- NLL team: San Jose Stealth
- Pro career: 2009–

Will Dalton from Queenstown, Maryland is a professional lacrosse transition player for the San Jose Stealth of the National Lacrosse League. Before college, Dalton was a member of the 2004 All-Tewaaraton Team for the Baltimore/Washington area. The newspapers, Baltimore Sun and Washington Post named him first team all-Metro. He was the 2004 Baltimore Sun Anne Arundel County Player of the Year, making him the third straight St. Mary's player to win the honor. The Baltimore Sun also picked Dalton for first team all-county.

In high school, Dalton won 71 percent of face-offs as a senior. He scored 22 goals and added seven assists despite being double and triple-teamed almost every time he touched the ball. Dalton was also all-county and all-metro as a junior and scored 24 goals and added 10 assists while winning 72 percent of his face-offs in 2003.

== College career ==
As a freshman (2005) for the University of Maryland Terrapins, Dalton scored his first career goal in his collegiate debut in a 13-6 season-opening win over No. 5 Georgetown (2/26); scored one shot, one groundball and one caused turnover in a 10-8 loss to Duke (3/5); won his first collegiate face-off at the start of the third quarter in a 9-5 win at No. 9 Towson (3/12); was one for three in face-offs and picked up a groundball in a 14-10 win at No. 18 Bucknell (3/15); won two-of-five face-offs and picked up a groundball in a 16-10 win over UMBC (3/19); had a tremendous game in the face-off circle, winning six of nine draws all in the second half, in a 9-4 win over No. 19 North Carolina (3/26); won his only face-off in an 11-6 loss to No. 1 Johns Hopkins (4/15); and gave the team a boost by winning seven-of-11 face-offs in an 8-7 overtime victory over No. 3 Virginia in the ACC Semifinals (4/29); and picked up where he left off in the UVa game by winning seven-of-10 face-offs in a 9-5 win over No. 2 Duke (5/1) to win the ACC championship (he also picked up four groundballs vs. the Blue Devils). Dalton was selected to the ACC All-Tournament team; received honorable mention for national player of the week award by Inside Lacrosse for his performance in the ACC Tournament; scored his first goal since the season opener in a 21-6 drubbing of Penn (5/7) at Lincoln Financial Field; won two-of-six face-offs, picked up one groundball and caused a turnover in a 14-10 win over No. 11 Penn State (5/14) in the first round of the NCAA Tournament; and won six-of-19 face-offs and picked up one groundball in 18-9 loss to No. 2 Duke (5/28) in the NCAA Semifinals.

As a sophomore (2006), Dalton saw his first action of the season, taking one face-off in a 7-6 loss in double overtime to Bucknell (3/14); saw time with the second midfield unit in a 9-4 victory at UMBC (3/18); scored his first goal of the season in a 14-2 win over Dartmouth (3/21); won four of five face-offs in a 15-5 loss to No. 1 Virginia (4/1); won three of five face-offs in an 18-2 win over Sacred Heart (4/18) and also picked up a groundball; won five-of-seven face-offs and picked up four groundballs in a 10-9 win over North Carolina (4/28) in the ACC Semifinals; won 12-of-22 draws vs. Denver's Geoff Snider (the NCAA's leading face-off man (69.5%)) picked up four groundballs in a 16-8 win over No. 12 Denver (5/13) in the first round of the NCAA Tournament; and won one-of-three face-offs in 8-5 loss to No. 10 UMass (5/27) in NCAA Semifinals.

As a junior (2007), Dalton won 12-of-18 face-offs, made his first start with the first midfield unit, scored the first game-winning goal of his career, and had seven groundballs in an 11-6 season-opening win over Bellarmine (2/17). Dalton had dominating face-off performance in a 16-7 win over Vermont (2/20), winning 18-of-22 face-offs and picking up a career-best eight groundballs. In an 8-6 loss to No. 4 Georgetown (2/24), he won six-of-14 face-offs and collected two groundballs. He scored a goal and won 11-of-22 face-offs and picked up five groundballs in a 14-7 loss to No. 2 Duke (3/2). Dalton won nine-of-18 face-offs and picked up four groundballs in a 13-4 win over Lafayette (3/13). He won 10-of-14 face-offs, scored a goal, and picked up six groundballs in an 18-3 win over Mount St. Mary's (3/20). Daktib scrounged two groundballs in a 14-8 win over No. 11 North Carolina (3/24). He won 5-of-9 face-offs and picked up two groundballs in a 12-8 loss at No. 2 Virginia (3/31); scored a goal and went five-of-14 in a 14-10 win at Penn (4/21); gathered up three groundballs in a 12-4 win over Yale (5/5); and won five-of-10 face-offs in a 13-9 loss to UMBC (5/13) in the NCAA tournament. He competed for most of 2007 with a separated shoulder.

As a senior, Dalton was the 2008 Team Captain. At the end of the year, he was given the school's "Big Man" award. In an 11-6 win over No. 4 Georgetown (2/23), Dalton scored one goal and collected three ground balls and six out of 17 face-offs. Dalton tallied one goal, three ground balls, and five of 10 face-offs in a 17-7 victory over Mount St. Mary's (2/25). In a 7-15 loss to No. 2 Duke (3/1), Dalton collected one ground ball, but managed to win none of his four face-off attempts. Dalton won seven of 10 face-offs, collected four ground balls, and scored a goal in a 12-10 win over No. 18 Towson (3/8). Dalton scored a goal, collected 11 ground balls, and won 12 of 18 face-offs in a three overtime loss to No. 19 UMBC (3/14). In a 16-4 victory over Air Force (3/16), he scored two goals, harvested two ground balls, and won four out of 12 face-offs. While beating No. 4 North Carolina (3/22) 13-8, Dalton scored one goal, but won zero out of five face-offs. In a 13-7 win over No. 1 ranked Virginia (3/29), Dalton won 8-of-14 face-offs and scored a goal. In a 5-4 loss to Navy (4/4), Dalton won one of three face-offs. While the team dropped a 10-4 decision at No. 15 Johns Hopkins (4/12), Dalton won three of 10 face-offs. Maryland beat Penn (4/19) 4-9 and Dalton collected 3 ground balls and three out of four face-offs. In a 16-10 win over Yale (5/3), Dalton scored two goals, collected five ground balls, and won 6 of 14 face-offs. Dalton won six of nine face-offs and collected two ground balls in a 7-8 overtime loss to No. 2 Virginia (5/17). In a 10-7 victory over Denver (5/10), he took two of seven face-offs and collected three ground balls. Over the season, he controlled 69 of 145 face-offs for a 47.6 percentage.

== NLL career ==
Dalton began his NLL career as an undrafted free agent with the San Jose Stealth, replacing Tim Booth on face-offs. In his first experiences with the team, he was notable for breaking sticks.

Following his time with the San Jose Stealth, he played in the MLL for the Chesapeake Bayhawks and Denver Outlaws.

== Coaching career ==
Dalton is currently the offensive coordinator for the St.Mary's High School (Annapolis) varsity men's lacrosse team. In addition, he is the Program Director and Head Coach for ProStart Lacrosse, a men's high school club team, based out of Annapolis, MD.

He received the "US Lacrosse Baltimore MIAA Assistant Coach of the Year" award in 2019.
