= ChildFund =

US-based nonprofit organization

ChildFund International
- Founded: 1938
- Founder: J. Calvitt Clarke
- Type: Charitable organization
- Purpose: Children
- Location: Henrico County, Virginia (Richmond mailing address)
- Region served: United States, South America, Africa, Asia
- Website: https://www.childfund.org/
- Formerly called: ChildFund Alliance (2002–); ChildFund International (US, 2009–); Christian Children's Fund (1951–2009); China's Children Fund (1938–1951)

ChildFund, also known an ChildFund International, and formerly known as Christian Children's Fund, is a child-focused international development organization that provides assistance to children facing poverty and other challenges in 24 countries, including the United States. ChildFund's headquarters are located in Richmond, Virginia, United States.

== Mission ==
ChildFund provides services to children, mostly funded by individual contributors in the form of monthly child sponsorships. In addition, ChildFund receives grants and donations that support vocational training, literacy training, food distribution, educational programs, early childhood development, health and immunization programs, nutritional programs, water and sanitation development, and emergency relief in both man-made and natural disasters.

The organization was formerly known for its TV commercials on major networks in the United States. A previous long-running series of advertisements had featured actress Sally Struthers as spokeswoman, who around the same time also did commercials for International Correspondence Schools. It was also known for its Christmas commercials that featured the song "Happy Xmas (War Is Over)".

== History ==
ChildFund was founded on October 6, 1938, as China's Children Fund by Presbyterian minister J. Calvitt Clarke to aid Chinese children displaced by the Second Sino-Japanese War. As the mission expanded to other countries, the name was changed on February 6, 1951 to Christian Children's Fund.

In June 2002, the Christian Children's Fund and 11 other international child sponsorship organizations founded a worldwide network, the ChildFund Alliance. The ChildFund Alliance comprises 12 organizations that partner to improve the lives of children and their families in more than 60 countries. On July 1, 2009, Christian Children's Fund changed its name to ChildFund International. The name change took into consideration donor confusion and to clarify that the organization was not functioning as a Christian organization. Some criticized the organization for appearing to be a Christian organization long after it had ended its religious affiliation.

== Child sponsorship model ==
Individual sponsors contribute funds on a monthly basis. Sponsor funds are combined to benefit entire communities. Each country's office develops its own programs based on the needs of local communities, but common programs include early childhood development programs, health care, clean water, and nutrition support. Sponsored children or their family members send letters to sponsors. ChildFund encourages sponsors to correspond with children through letters and photographs as well. The organization also features an electronic correspondence program. The letters are translated by representatives of the organization. Sponsors also receive annual progress reports and updated photographs of their sponsored children. Sponsors can travel to meet their sponsored children but must undergo a background check.

== Efficiency and financials ==
Charity Navigator gives ChildFund a rating of four out of four stars. For 2019, ChildFund allocated its $215.1 million in public support & revenue as follows:

- Program expenses: 77.8%
- Administrative expenses: 9.4%
- Fundraising expenses: 12.8%

== ChildFund Alliance ==
ChildFund International is a member of ChildFund Alliance, a global network of child-focused development and humanitarian organisations established in 2002. The Alliance brings together its member organisations to collaborate on children's rights, child protection, humanitarian assistance and international development.

As of 2026, ChildFund Alliance lists ten member organisations: ChildFund Australia, ChildFund Deutschland, ChildFund International, ChildFund Japan, ChildFund New Zealand, Barnfonden, Children Believe, Educo, Un Enfant par la Main and WeWorld.

== Publications ==
ChildFund publishes annual reports and other documents about its programs. In 2023 publications included reports and briefs on climate actions, online safety, education in emergencies, migration, Gaza, and Ukraine.

== Global COVID-19 response ==
In April 2020, ChildFund launched a $56 million global response plan to reach 6.3 million children and family members in 61 countries affected by the COVID-19 crisis. It was the largest emergency response in the organization’s history and had four priorities: fighting child hunger, equipping children and families with health and hygiene information and supplies, protecting children from violence and exploitation, and helping children continue their education. To date, the organization has assisted hundreds of thousands of families through direct cash transfers and other aid.

== Bibliography ==
- A Book About Children: Christian Children's Fund 1938-1991, Larry Tise, 1983, Hartland Publishing.
