= Sérgio Vieira de Mello =

Brazilian UN diplomat and humanitarian aid officer (1948–2003)

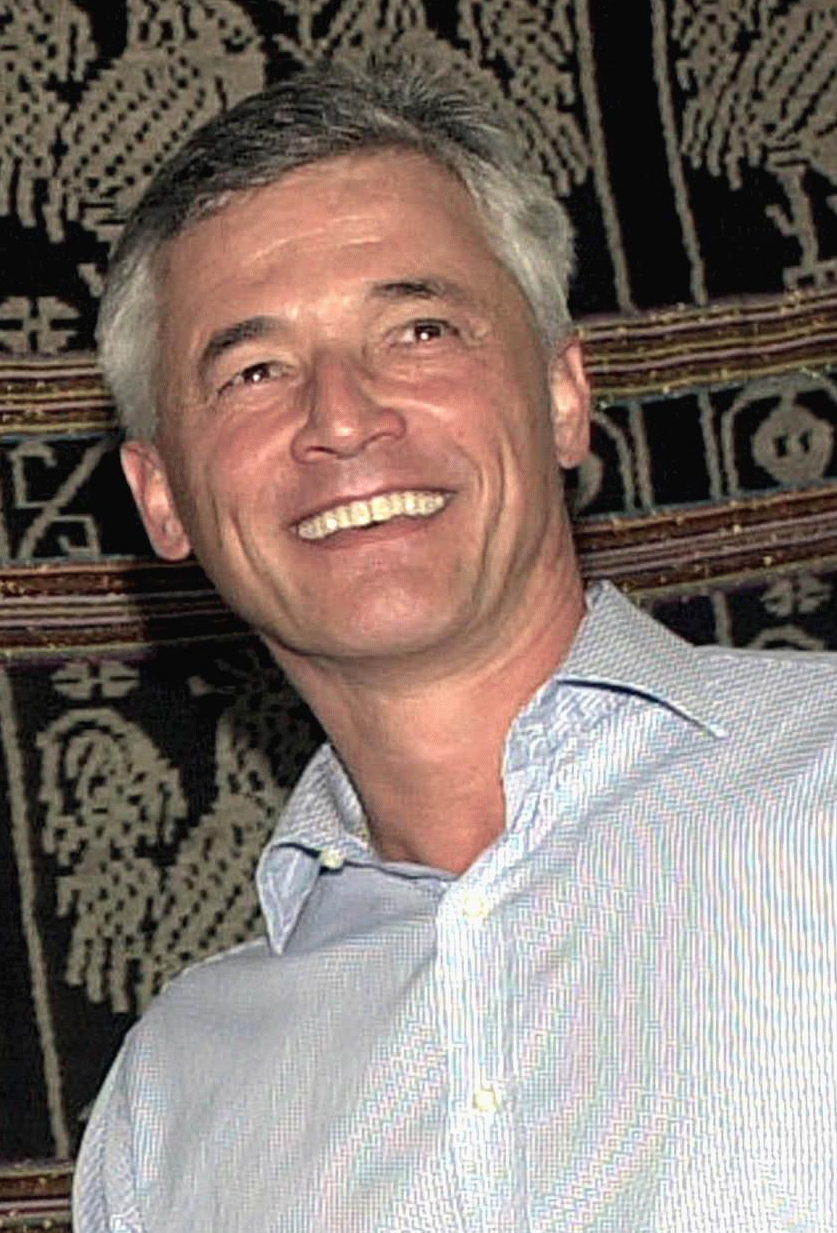
- Vieira de Mello c. 2002

3rd United Nations High Commissioner for Human Rights
- In office 12 September 2002 – 19 August 2003
- Preceded by: Mary Robinson
- Succeeded by: Bertrand Ramcharan (acting)

East Timor UN Transitional Administrator
- In office 25 October 1999 – 20 May 2002
- Preceded by: José Abílio Osório Soares (as Governor of East Timor)
- Succeeded by: Xanana Gusmão (as President of East Timor)

Personal details
- Born: 15 March 1948 Rio de Janeiro, Brazil
- Died: 19 August 2003 (aged 55) Baghdad, Iraq
- Cause of death: Killed in the Canal Hotel bombing
- Spouse: Annie Personnaz (m. 1973; sep. 1986)
- Domestic partner: Carolina Larriera (2001–2003)
- Children: 2
- Education: Federal University of Rio de Janeiro; University of Paris (Sorbonne); University of Paris 1 Panthéon-Sorbonne
- Awards: Order of the Two Niles (1973)

Sérgio Vieira de Mello (Portuguese pronunciation: [ˈsɛʁʒju viˈejɾɐ dʒi ˈmɛlu]; 15 March 1948 – 19 August 2003) was a Brazilian United Nations diplomat who worked on several UN humanitarian and political programs for over 34 years. The Government of Brazil posthumously awarded the Sergio Vieira de Mello Medal to honor his legacy in promoting sustainable peace, international security and better living conditions for individuals in situations of armed conflict, challenges to which Sérgio Vieira de Mello had dedicated his life and career.

He was killed in the Canal Hotel bombing in Iraq along with 20 other members of his staff on 19 August 2003 while working as UN High Commissioner for Human Rights, with the rank of Under-Secretary-General, and United Nations Special Representative for Iraq. Before his death, he was considered a likely candidate for UN Secretary-General.

== Early life, education, and early career ==
Vieira de Mello was born in Rio de Janeiro to the diplomat Arnaldo Vieira de Mello and his wife Gilda dos Santos on 15 March 1948. He had an older sister, Sônia, who suffered schizophrenia throughout her adult life. Vieira de Mello was interested in rocket science as a child. The family followed Arnaldo's diplomatic postings, such that Sérgio spent his early years in Buenos Aires, Genoa, Milan, Beirut and Rome.

In 1965, he was studying philosophy at the Federal University of Rio de Janeiro, but since classes were frequently disrupted by strikes, he opted to continue his education in Europe. He continued at the University of Paris, where he studied philosophy under Vladimir Jankélévitch. While there, he stayed at an apartment at the Maison de l’Argentine, the student housing at the Cité Internationale Universitaire de Paris dedicated to students with families from Latin America.

He participated in the 1968 student riots in Paris against the Charles de Gaulle government, and was hit in the head by a police baton, causing a permanent disfigurement above his right eye. He also wrote a letter published in the French leftist journal Combat in support of the riots, which made his return to Brazil, at this stage a military dictatorship, potentially dangerous. Thus, after graduating from the Sorbonne in 1969, he moved to Geneva to stay with a family friend, and found his first job as an editor at the United Nations High Commissioner for Refugees (UNHCR).

Early in his career, he also completed an MA in moral philosophy and a PhD by correspondence from the Sorbonne. His doctorate thesis, submitted in 1974, was entitled The Role of Philosophy in Contemporary Society. In 1985, he submitted a second "state" doctorate, the highest degree in the French education system, entitled Civitas Maxima: Origins, Foundations and Philosophical and Political Significance of the Supranationality Concept. In addition to his native Portuguese, Vieira de Mello was fluent in English, Spanish, Italian, and French, along with conversational knowledge of local languages of the countries he was stationed in, such as Arabic and Tetum.

== UN career ==
From UNHCR, Vieira de Mello moved to the field in Bangladesh during its War of Independence in 1971, and Sudan in 1972 following the Addis Ababa agreement that ended the First Sudanese Civil War and allowed the return of some 650,000 Sudanese refugees and displaced persons, and Cyprus after the Turkish invasion in 1974.

These early assignments were operational, rather than political; he was helping to organize food aid, shelter and other types of aid to refugees. Vieira de Mello remained in the field, with a posting in Mozambique to assist refugees fleeing white rule and civil war in Zimbabwe (at the time, still Rhodesia) where he was deputy head of the office. Due to the absence of his boss, he was effectively running the mission.

Vieira de Mello spent three years in charge of UNHCR operations in Mozambique during the civil war that followed its independence from Portugal in 1975, and three more years in Peru. Vieira de Mello also served as Special Envoy for the UNHCR for Cambodia, being the first and only UN Representative to hold talks with the Khmer Rouge. He became a senior political adviser to the United Nations Interim Force in Lebanon between 1981 and 1983. In 1985, he returned to Latin America to serve as head of the Argentina office in Buenos Aires.

He spent the 1990s involved in the clearing of land mines in Cambodia, and then in Yugoslavia. After working on the refugee problem in central Africa, he was made Assistant High Commissioner for Refugees in 1996 and became Under-Secretary-General for Humanitarian Affairs and Emergency Relief Coordinator two years later. He would hold this position simultaneously with others until January 2001.

On 11 June 1999, he was appointed Special Representative of the Secretary-General for Kosovo (SRSGK) in the acting capacity, and thus became the first chief of the United Nations Interim Administration Mission in Kosovo (UNMIK), that was established on 10 June 1999, by the United Nations Security Council Resolution 1244. His term in Kosovo (autonomous province in Serbia, within the Federal Republic of Yugoslavia) ended already on 14 July 1999, when Bernard Kouchner was appointed as SRSGK in the full capacity.

Vieira de Mello was instrumental in dealing with the issue of boat people in Hong Kong. In mid-2000, he visited Fiji together with Don McKinnon, the Commonwealth of Nations' Secretary-General, in an attempt to assist in finding a negotiated settlement to the hostage situation, in which Fiji's Prime Minister and other members of Parliament were kidnapped and held as hostages during the 2000 Fijian coup d'état.

Before becoming the UN High Commissioner for Human Rights in 2002, he was the UN Transitional Administrator in East Timor from December 1999 to May 2002, guiding the former Indonesia's 27th province to independence.

In May 2003 Vieira de Mello was appointed as the Special Representative of the UN Secretary-General to Iraq, an appointment initially intended to last for four months. According to The New York Times Magazine journalist James Traub in his book The Best Intentions, Vieira de Mello turned down the appointment three times before Kofi Annan was pressured by US President George W. Bush and Condoleezza Rice. According to Samantha Power in her book Sérgio: One Man's Fight to Save the World, Vieira de Mello met Bush in March 2003, and the two men discussed the human rights situation in the Guantanamo Bay detention camp, a controversial issue for the United States. In June 2003, Vieira de Mello was part of a team responsible for inspecting Abu Ghraib prison before it was rebuilt.

== Death ==
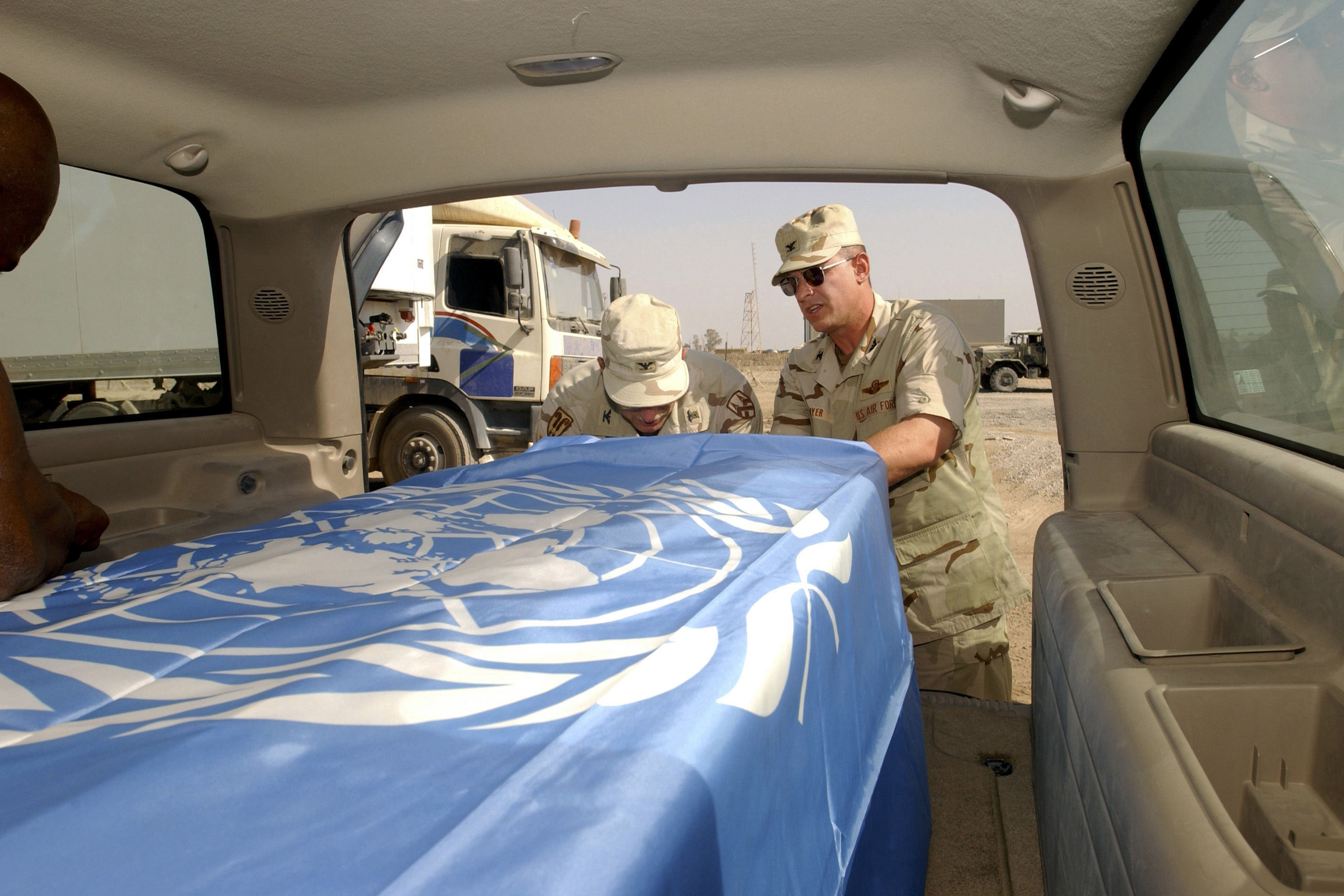
U.S. soldiers placing Vieira de Mello's casket into an SUV.

Vieira de Mello was working as a United Nations Special Representative for Iraq when he was killed in the Canal Hotel bombing. Abu Musab al-Zarqawi, a leader of the al-Qaeda terrorist organization, claimed responsibility for the blast. A communiqué from al-Qaeda said that de Mello was assassinated because he had helped East Timor become an independent state, thereby stealing territory from the Islamic caliphate.

He had been mentioned in some circles as a suitable candidate for UN Secretary-General. His death was widely mourned, largely on account of his reputation for effectively working to promote peace. Vieira de Mello had previously stated that he wished to be buried in Rio de Janeiro, his hometown, and the place he lived for 34 years. However, his body was taken away from Brazil and he was buried at the Cimetière des Rois in the Plainpalais district of Geneva, Switzerland. Vieira was honoured in his hometown of Rio de Janeiro where he was given a state funeral with full military honors. His funeral was attended by President Luiz Inácio Lula da Silva and other international dignitaries. He was survived by his two sons, Adrien and Laurent.

== Personal life ==
In 1973, Vieira de Mello met and married Annie Personnaz, a French staff member at UNHCR Headquarters in Geneva, with whom he had two sons, Laurent and Adrien. They lived in the French town of Thonon-les-Bains, before moving a few years later to a permanent home in the French village of Massongy, near the Geneva border. The couple separated before Vieira de Mello's death, with a divorce lawsuit filed on 9 January 2003, which was never executed.

From 2001 onwards, he was in a relationship with Carolina Larriera, whom he had met in East Timor where she worked as part of the General Service support staff of the UN mission. Viera de Mello presented Larriera as his fiancée privately and in official events. The couple intended to return to Switzerland after the mission in Iraq, where he would be reinstalled as High Commissioner for Human Rights. Sergio planned to marry Larriera as soon as he was officially divorced, and thereafter establish a home and family in Switzerland.

Larriera was summoned by Sergio to work alongside him in Iraq, and was at the Canal Hotel at the day of the bombing. However, the UN did not recognize Larriera as Vieira de Mello's partner. She claimed that she was excluded from the list of survivors of the Canal Hotel bombing, and her comments were not taken into account in the report regarding the attack. She moved to Rio de Janeiro and lived with Vieira de Mello's mother.

Personnaz still lives in France, and has co-founded a Swiss charity, the Sérgio Vieira de Mello Foundation, with his two sons and close friends and colleagues to honor his name and memory.

== Awards and recognition ==
Vieira de Mello received several posthumous awards and honours, chief of which was the Legion d'honneur, France's highest honor, given to his widow and two sons in Geneva. He was also awarded the Order of Rio Branco, the highest honor from the Government of Brazil to be given to a citizen, the Pedro Ernesto Medal, the highest honor in his hometown of Rio de Janeiro, in 2003. In April 2004, Sérgio Vieira de Mello was posthumously awarded the "Statesman of the Year Award" by the EastWest Institute. In 2003 he received the United Nations Prize in the Field of Human Rights and, in 2004, he received the Pax Christi International Peace Award.

Following the initiative of the Villa Decius Association, the Polish Prize of Sérgio Vieira de Mello was established in the year 2003 to promote human rights, democracy, and tolerance and had its first edition in 2004.

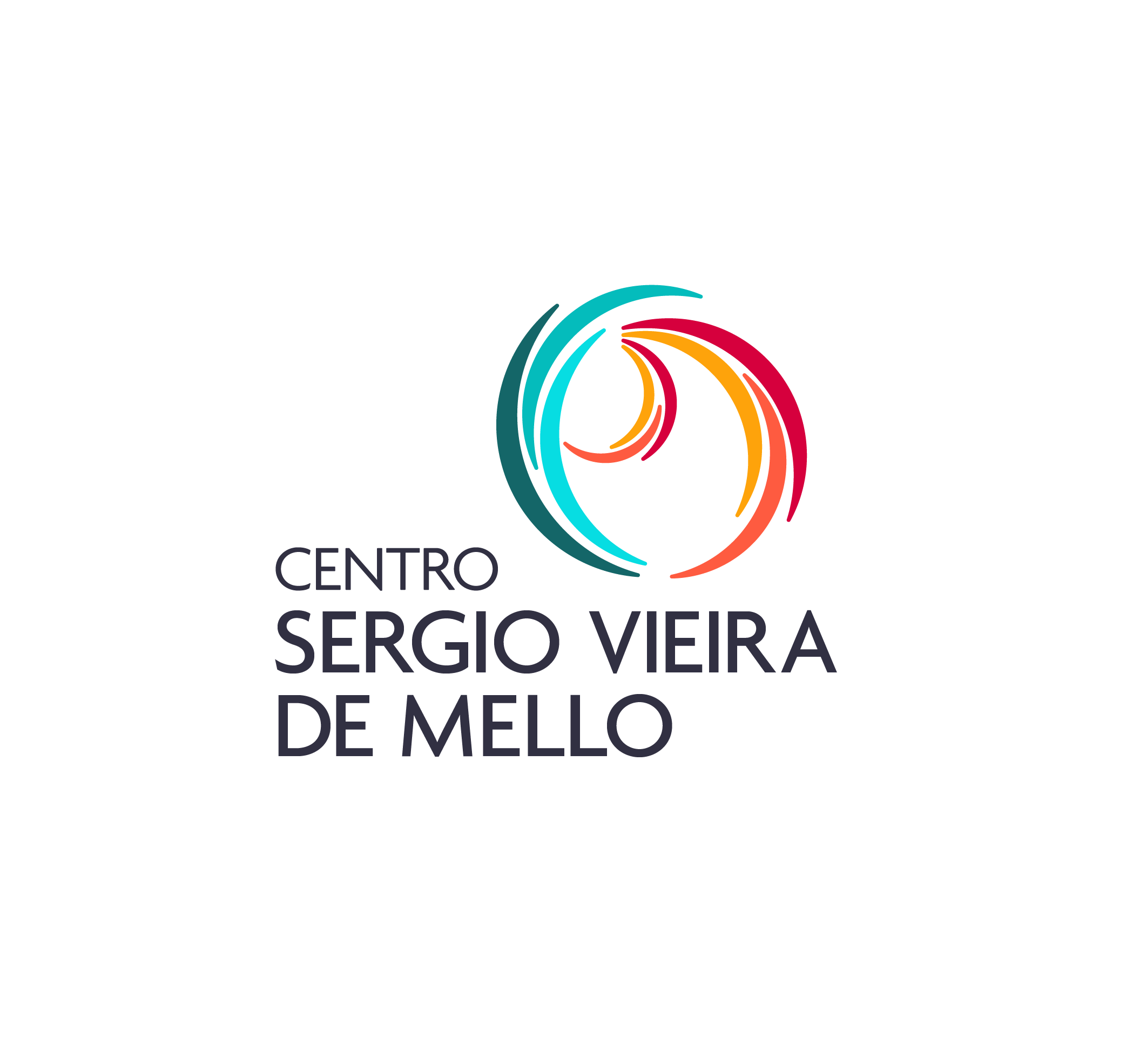
Logo of the Centro Sérgio Vieira de Mello

Sérgio Vieira de Mello Center

The Sérgio Vieira de Mello Center was founded by his mother, Gilda Vieira de Mello, and Sérgio's surviving spouse Carolina Larriera, also a former UN diplomat and Harvard-trained professional, to honor his legacy, and works with a network of supporters out of Brazil, Sergio's country of nationality and Timor-Leste, the country he helped create – around the world.

The Sérgio Vieira de Mello Center works through a nationwide network of universities specialized in international relations and the future generation of world ambassadors. Specifically, the Sérgio Vieira de Mello Center focuses on the use of technology, entrepreneurism, and networks to mobilize mentors and disciples and build a sustainable peace model that can be easily replicated. It engages Harvard and MIT engineers and education professionals to empower local communities and schools. The Center matches ivory tower professionals with a base of the pyramid and disenfranchised youth, identifying easily obtained opportunities. With ANAPRI, the National Association of International Relations Professionals is mobilizing Congress for more resources for the professionalization of the sector.

The Center engages and actively supports a network of more than one hundred schools and institutions bearing Sérgio's name in Brazil and abroad, and provides teaching tools and in-kind material. It also runs the Gilda Vieira de Mello Prize dedicated to her son Sergio Vieira de Mello which is awarded annually in Geneva during the International Film Festival and Forum on Human Rights. The prize comes with a monetary award of CHF 5,000.

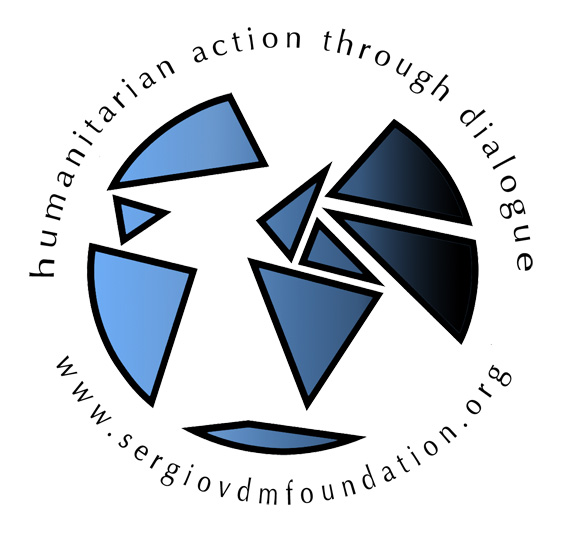
Logo of the SVDM Foundation.

Sergio Vieira de Mello Foundation

The Sergio Vieira de Mello Foundation was created in 2007 to honor his memory, pursue his ideals, and continue his unfinished mission. The Foundation was established in Geneva, at the initiative of his two sons and his estranged wife, with some friends and colleagues. In 2008, Kofi Annan launched the first annual lecture, followed by Sadako Ogata in 2009, by Bernard Kouchner in 2010, by José Manuel Durão Barroso in 2011, and by Cornelio Sommaruga in 2012. Lectures take place at the Graduate Institute of International and Development Studies in Geneva.

On 11 December 2008, the United Nations General Assembly made history when it adopted Swedish-sponsored GA Resolution A/63/L.49 on the Strengthening of the Coordination of Emergency Assistance of the United Nations, that amongst other important humanitarian decisions, decided to designate 19 August as the World Humanitarian Day (WHD). The Resolution gives for the first time, a special recognition to all humanitarian and United Nations and associated personnel who have worked in the promotion of the humanitarian cause and those who have died in the cause of duty and urges all Member States, entities of the United Nations within existing resources, as well as the other International Organizations and Non-Governmental Organizations to observe it annually in an appropriate way. As a background to this landmark resolution, the family of Sérgio Vieira de Mello resolved to work towards having 19 August recognized as a befitting tribute to all humanitarian personnel. Early April 2008 the Board of the Sérgio Vieira de Mello Foundation prepared a draft Resolution to be sponsored and adopted by the General Assembly designating 19 August as World Humanitarian Day. France, Switzerland, Japan, and Brazil, contacted with the draft Resolution, agreed to co-sponsor it.

Sérgio Vieira de Mello founded the United Nations Housing Rights Programme, currently a part of the United Nations Human Settlements Programme, which aims to "assist States and other stakeholders with the implementation of their commitments in the Habitat Agenda".

The new square dedicated to Sérgio Vieira de Mello in Bologna, Italy (January 2011)

After his death, the Italian city of Bologna was dedicated to Sergio Vieira de Mello a square (Piazza Sérgio Vieira de Mello) situated in a modern part of the central quartiere Navile.

Vieira de Mello's life was the subject of the 2020 biopic Sergio, starring Wagner Moura in the title role.

In 2026, the comic book "When the world calls" (originally "Une vie pour les autres" in french) was published by La Joie de lire, written by Blaise Hofmann and illustrated by Swiss artist Elmax, in which part of Sergio Vieira de Mello's life is recounted, the relationship his sons had with their mostly absent father, and the impact he might have had today on current conflicts.

== Career chronology ==
- 1969–1971: French Editor, UNHCR, Geneva, Switzerland
- 1971–1972: Project Officer, UNHCR, Dhaka, East Pakistan
- 1972–1973: Programme Officer, UNHCR, Juba, Sudan
- 1974–1975: Programme Officer, UNHCR, Nicosia, Cyprus
- 1975–1977: Deputy Representative and Representative, UNHCR, Maputo, Mozambique
- 1978–1980: Representative, UNHCR, Lima, Peru
- 1980–1981: Head of Career Development and Training Unit of Personnel Section, UNHCR, Geneva, Switzerland
- 1981–1983: Senior Political Officer, UNIFIL, DPKO, Lebanon
- 1983–1985: Deputy Head of Personnel, UNHCR, Geneva, Switzerland
- 1986–1988: Chef de Cabinet and Secretary to the executive committee, UNHCR, Geneva, Switzerland
- 1988–1990: Director of Asia Bureau, UNHCR, Geneva, Switzerland
- 1990–1991: Director of External Affairs, UNHCR, Geneva, Switzerland
- 1991–1993: Director for Repatriation and Resettlement Operations, UNTAC, DPKO, and Special Envoy of High Commissioner Sadako Ogata, UNHCR, Phnom Penh, Cambodia
- 1993–1994: Director of Political Affairs, UNPROFOR, DPKO, Sarajevo, Bosnia-Herzegovina
- 1994–1996: Director of Operations and Planning, UNHCR, Geneva, Switzerland
- October–December 1996: Special Envoy of Secretary-General to the Great Lakes Region
- 1996–1998: Assistant High Commissioner for Refugees, UNHCR, Geneva, Switzerland
- 1998–2002: Under-Secretary-General for Humanitarian Affairs, UN, New York, US
- 11 June–14 July 1999: Special Representative of the Secretary-General for Kosovo
- 1999–2002: Transitional Administrator, UNTAET, DPKO, and Special Representative of the Secretary-General of the United Nations, Dili, East Timor
- 2002–2003: High Commissioner for Human Rights, Geneva, Switzerland
- May–August 2003: Special Representative of the UN Secretary-General to Iraq

== See also ==
- List of peace activists
- Luiz Carlos da Costa
- World Humanitarian Day
- Sergio (2009 film)
- Sergio (2020 film)

Positions in intergovernmental organisations
Preceded by Yasushi Akashi ( (Japan) )	Undersecretary-General for Humanitarian Affairs and Emergency Relief Coordinator; 1998–2001	Succeeded by Kenzo Oshima ( (Japan) )
Preceded by Mary Robinson (1997–2002)	UN High Commissioner for Human Rights; 2002–2003	Succeeded by Bertrand Ramcharan (2003–2004) Louise Arbour (2004)
Preceded by Nicolau dos Reis Lobato (nominal President of East Timor) 1978	UN Administrator for East Timor; 1999–2002	Succeeded by Xanana Gusmão as President of East Timor
Preceded by N/A	Special Representative of the UN Secretary-General for Iraq; 2003	Succeeded by Ashraf Qazi
