= Marla Olmstead =

American artist (born 2000)

- Born: 2000 (age 25–26); Binghamton, New York, U.S.
- Occupation: Artist
- Parent(s): Laura and Mark Olmstead

Marla Olmstead (born 2000) is an American painter of abstract art who, by the age of four, caught international media attention for work purportedly hers. Abstract artworks painted by her have been as large as five feet (1.52 m) square and have sold for tens of thousands of US dollars. A 2005 60 Minutes II story on Olmstead that first brought her publicity led to speculation that the works supposedly created by Marla were in fact created in collaboration with her father, which was further examined in the 2007 documentary on her, My Kid Could Paint That.

== Painting career ==
According to her parents, Marla Olmstead began painting just before her second birthday in early 2002 when her father, Mark, gave her paint to divert her from distracting him from his own painting. Mark painted for a very brief period after his father died, and makes no claims of being an artist of any variety. Eventually, her work was on display at a local coffee shop. Soon after a customer bought one of the paintings for $253, a local gallery owner was shown one of her works and eventually organized a show at his gallery. From that point forward, Olmstead's paintings began to sell frequently.

In 2013, she gave an interview at "The Intersection", which is a one-day gathering of innovative thinkers.

== Media attention ==
Her work increased in popularity after her first gallery showing, with many of the paintings selling for tens of thousands of US dollars.

The skill demonstrated in the paintings has prompted critics and media to draw comparisons to abstract artists Wassily Kandinsky and Jackson Pollock. Marla has attracted media attention from The New York Times and Time magazine.

=== Controversy ===
In February 2005, a report by CBS News' 60 Minutes II raised questions about whether Marla created the paintings on her own. 60 Minutes enlisted the help of Ellen Winner, a child psychologist who studies cognition in the arts and gifted children. Winner was impressed with Marla's work, and indicated that Marla was the first child prodigy she'd seen paint abstractly. The Olmsteads agreed to permit CBS crews to set up a hidden camera in their home to tape their daughter painting a single piece in five hours over the course of a month. When Winner reviewed the tapes, the psychologist said, "I saw no evidence that she was a child prodigy in painting. I saw a normal, charming, adorable child painting the way preschool children paint, except that she had a coach who kept her going." Winner also indicated that the painting created after CBS's hidden camera looked "less polished than some of Marla's previous works."

The 2007 documentary My Kid Could Paint That, by director Amir Bar-Lev, examines Marla Olmstead, her family, and the controversy surrounding the art attributed to her. The film does not explicitly take a position on the question of her works' authenticity, but Bar-Lev is heard during his interviews of Marla's parents and in a piece included as an extra on the DVD expressing doubts about whether Marla created the paintings herself. It includes excerpts from start-to-finish videos of two of Marla's works and questions whether the two works, the 60 Minutes painting (known as "Flowers") and "Ocean," are of the same quality as other works attributed to her. After Bar-Lev expressed these doubts and began filming Marla to capture her painting a work of similar quality to paintings previously sold in her name, she is seen repeatedly asking her father to help her paint a face on the painting or paint it himself - the exchange taking place during playful banter between Marla and her father.

The Olmsteads did not attend the film's official premiere, having felt that Bar-Lev, who doubts that Olmstead created the paintings attributed to her, made editing choices that portrayed them in bad light. In December 2015, 15-year-old Olmstead stated that she had never seen the film, and had no intention of doing so, saying, "I don’t want to watch things on myself." She and her brother did see the film's trailer, and found it "a bit ridiculous and funny", in particular a shot of Laura tearing as she said, "What have I done to my children?"
