= Josef Hnízdil =

Czech painter and sculptor

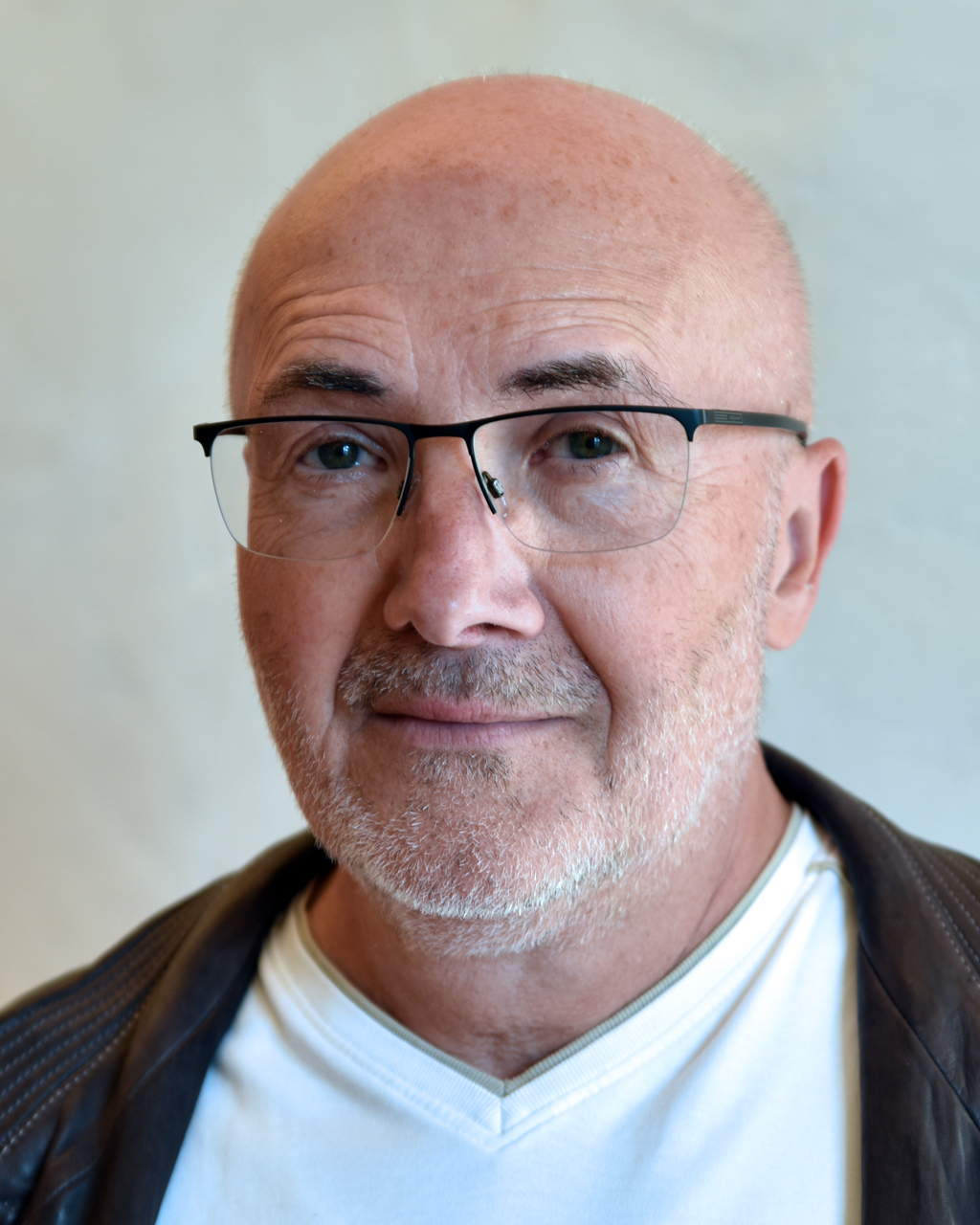
- Hnízdil in 2019
- Born: 13 July 1952; Turnov, Czechoslovakia
- Spouse: Markéta Mališová

Josef Hnízdil (born 13 July 1952) is a Czech painter and sculptor.

== Life ==
Josef Hnízdil was born on 13 July 1952 in Turnov. He studied at the Secondary School of Applied Arts for Jewelry in Turnov in 1966–1970 and exhibited his work for the first time in 1971 at the International Exhibition of Jewelry in Jablonec nad Nisou. He spent a year at the Secondary School of Applied Arts for Sculpture and Stonemasonry in Hořice (1970–1971).

After an unsuccessful attempt to enrol at the Academy of Fine Arts in Prague, Hnízdil emigrated to France in 1974 with his classmate from the Hořice stonemasonry school, Jan Tesař. In Paris, he was accepted to study at the École nationale supérieure des beaux-arts in the sculpture studio of Prof. Michel Charpentier, but he did not ultimately attend the school. During his stay in Paris (1974–1975), he drew and visited museums, and thanks to the support of the local Czech community (including Pavel Tigrid and Mr. and Mrs. Dubin, and Josef Fišera), he spent a year of freedom and liberty. From there he left for New York, where he found greater artistic independence. In 1975–1976, he was a member of the Art Students League of New York. He worked in a foundry workshop and, at the same time, sought to find his own path in his portrait and figural painting through dialogue with the old masters. He exhibited at the Soho Center for Visual Artists Gallery and participated in avant-garde exhibitions in a number of galleries in the East Village, where the center of contemporary art in New York emerged in the 1980s. Most of the works from this period remained in the United States.

Shortly after the end of the communist regime, he presented his paintings at two exhibitions in Prague, and in 1991, after 17 years of exile in France and United States, he decided to return to Czechoslovakia permanently. From 1993 to 1999, he was a member of the New Association of Prague Painters, and from 2002 a member of the Mánes Union of Fine Arts, since 2020 member of Umělecká beseda. Since 2013, he has been a member of the Free Association M. He lives and works in Černošice.

== Work ==
The theme of Josef Hnízdil's early work, of which only about 30 paintings have survived, was expressive figural compositions inspired by student life. They were created outside the school grounds as records of pubs, parties, or the streets and are autobiographical in nature. One of his first paintings, offering parallels with dances of death, seems to anticipate his entire subsequent work. The figure of a dancing young man, with his face turned towards the viewer (Dance I, 1969), is a loose self-portrait. He leads one girl in a wild dance, while the other lies in the background like a discarded rag doll. The artist destroyed a large part of his paintings before emigrating to Paris.

In France, he worked mainly with pastels and created a series of self-portraits. Almost everything he created during his stay in Paris was later lost by his mother at the airport. In the United States, he devoted himself mainly to figurative and portrait work, small bronze sculptures, and monumental sculptures – fragments of faces. In 1990, he created two large portraits (3 m x 1.5 m) of Luciano Pavarotti, one of which was owned by the famous Italian and the other was exhibited at the Lincoln Center gallery in New York City. This painting was later stolen and disappeared for twenty years, only to reappear unexpectedly in Prague in the inheritance of a deceased woman.

After returning from exile, the human skull became the main theme of Josef Hnízdil's paintings and sculptures. Memories of a visit to the Sedlec Ossuary near Kutná Hora remained with him as a childhood experience. The ossuary had an equally strong impact on him later when he attended a requiem mass. In the history of fine art, the human skull has been a symbol and reminder of human mortality (Memento mori) and the transience of human life on earth (Vanitas). Although journalists somewhat simplistically characterize Hnízdil as a "skull painter," this is essentially an existential theme for painters, one that is multi-layered, timeless, and also purely artistic. Hnízdil perceives skulls as fascinating objects, always perfect and beautiful in their structure and form, which offer painters the same possibilities for artistic interpretation as any other natural shape. At first, he studied them using models borrowed from the school in Turnov and the Hrdlička Museum at the Faculty of Science, Charles University. His paintings and drawings of skulls are influenced by his training in sculpture, and the complex plastic surface of monochrome painting offers rich possibilities for working with light and shadow.

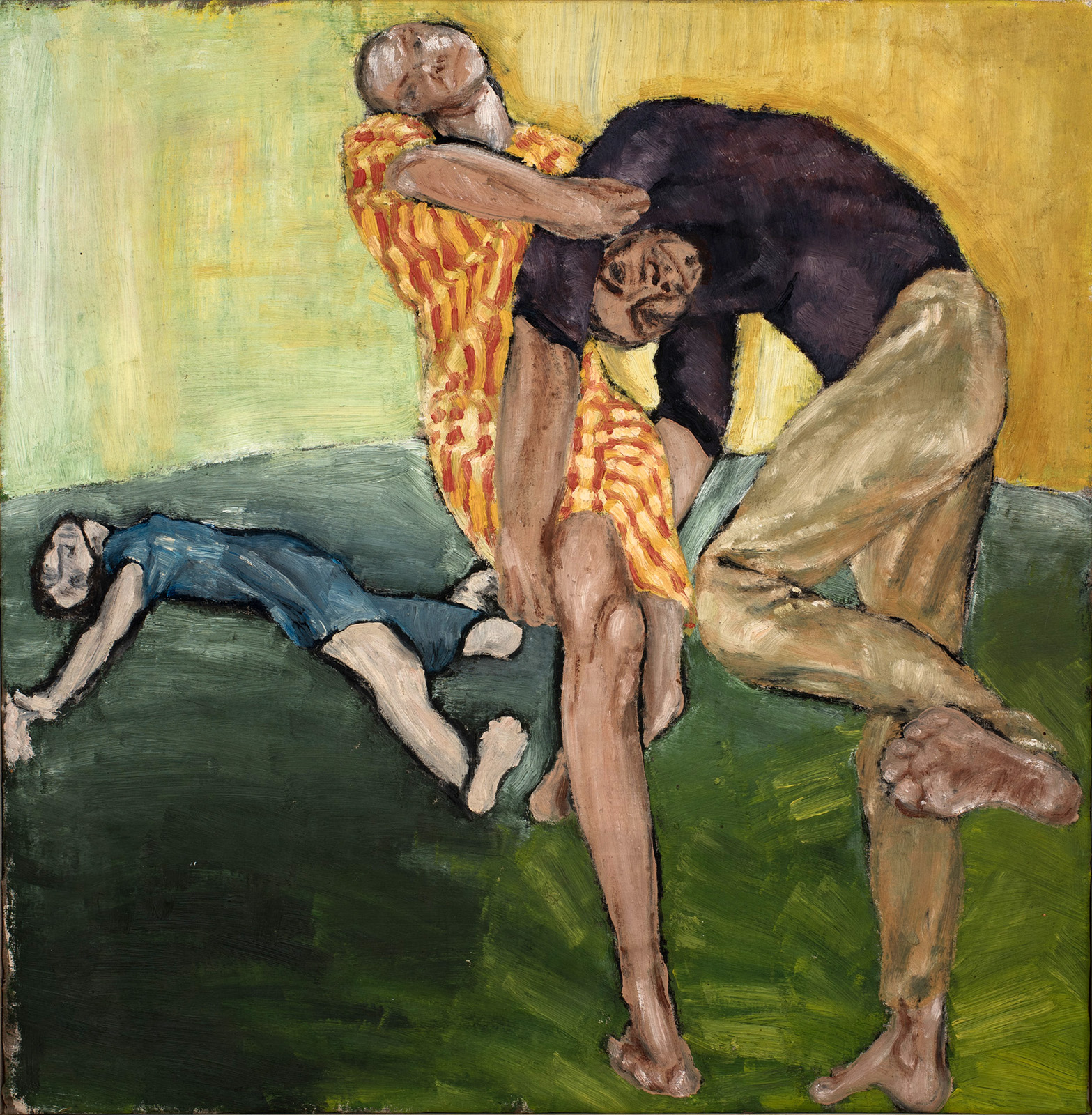
Dance l, 1969

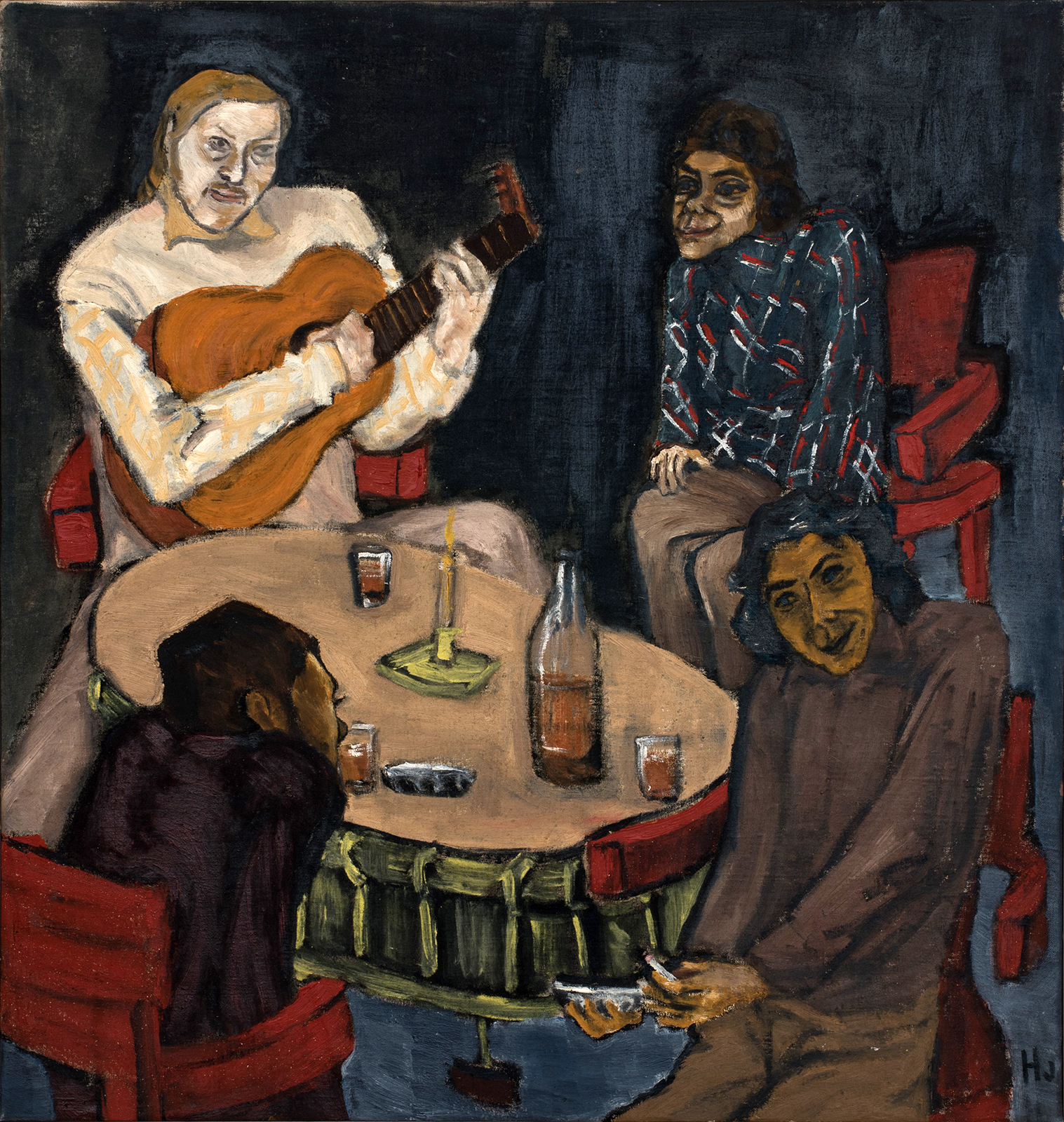
Party, 1971

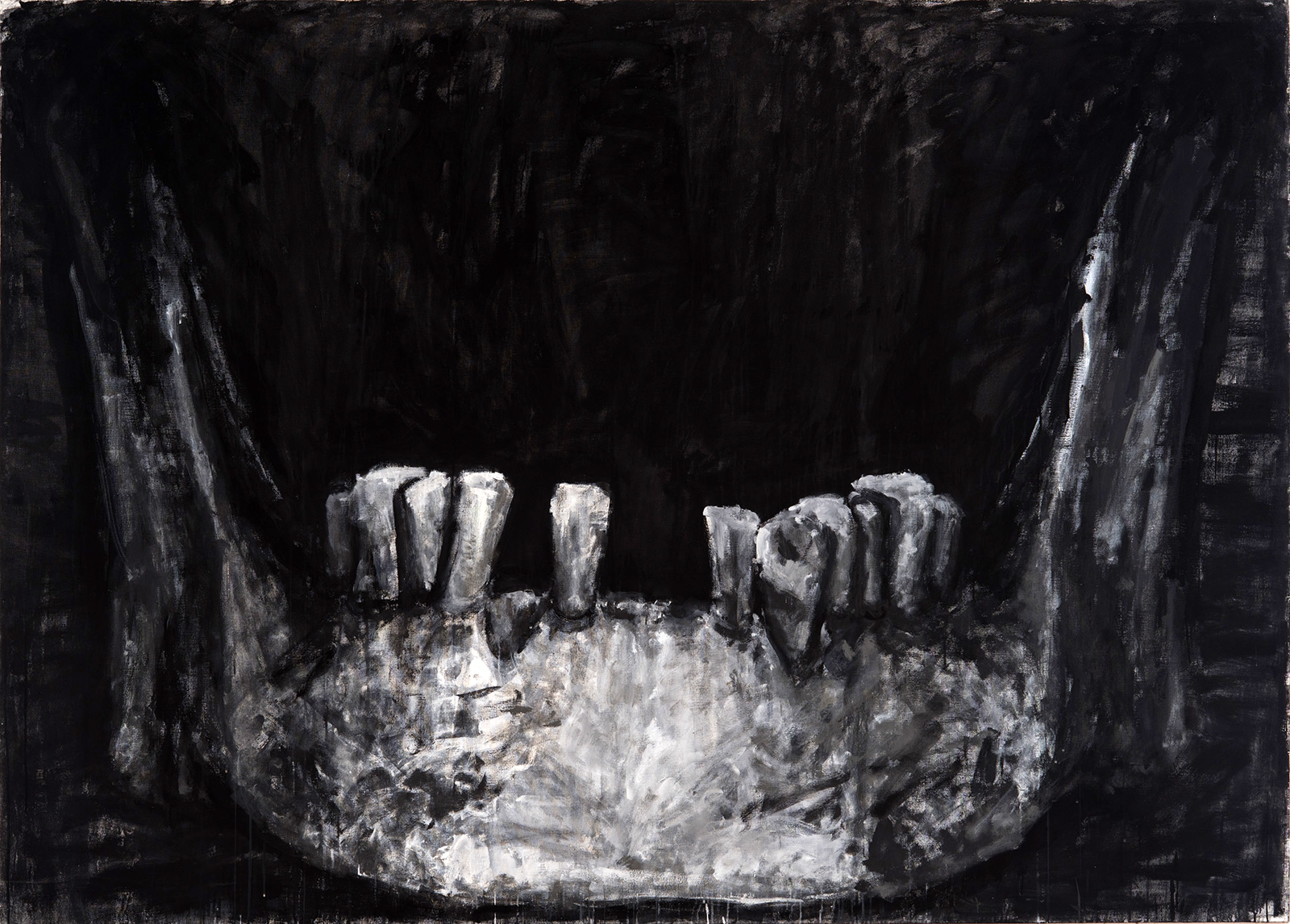
Large jaw, 1994

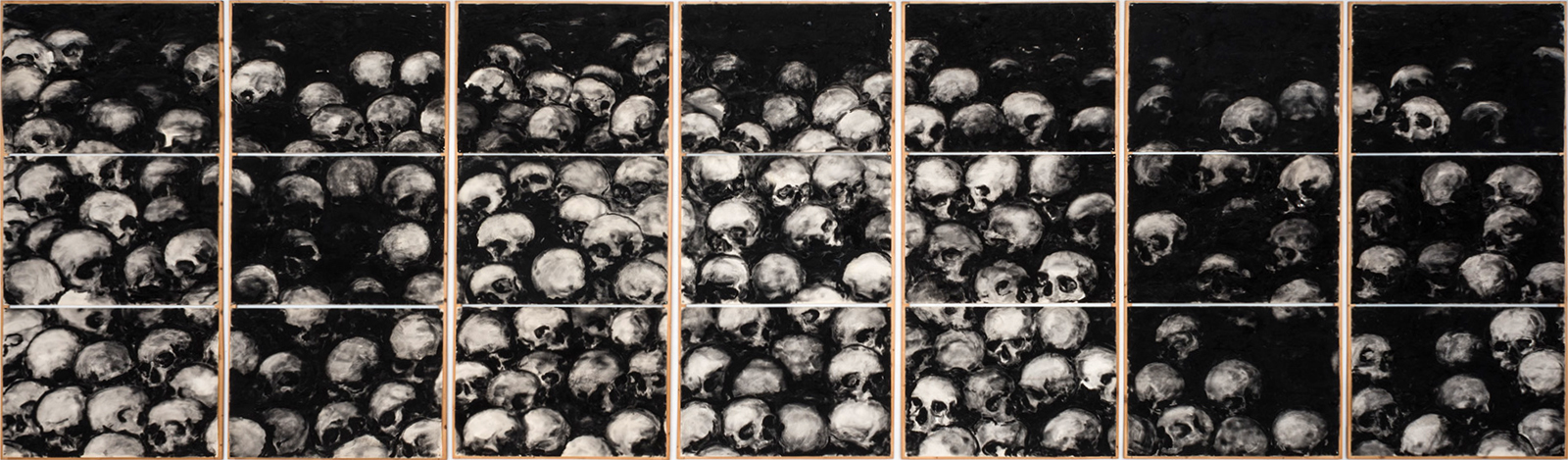
Grave in Carmel, 1994

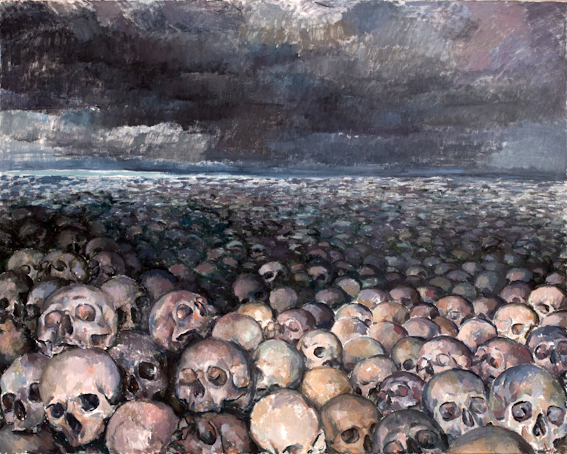
Native mound, 2003

Skulls are not only a grim topic reminiscent of inevitable death, but also represent the remains of human existence that have survived for millennia and symbolize eternity. Hnízdil paints them as individualized portraits of specific people, whose empty faces provide a glimpse into the human mind and, paradoxically, appear even more like masks hiding an inscrutable identity.

The painter reflects on the haunting visual experience of the ossuary in a series of separate paintings (Triumph of Death, 2012-2015) or in a composition of 21 tempera paintings on paper, which together form a kind of endless landscape with skulls (Grave in Carmel, 1994). They have an oppressive effect on the viewer, as they resemble a crowd watching him with empty eye sockets. Hnízdil also monumentalizes the theme of death with enlarged details of specific parts of the skull (Calva, 1998-1999) or skeleton. His large-scale paintings of human skeletons paraphrase the motifs of the Crucifixion (Postponed Case, 2017) or the Pilgrim accompanied by Death ("From Nowhere to Nowhere," 2016). Monothematicity suits his personal disposition, which prefers a focused, thoughtful approach to the problem.

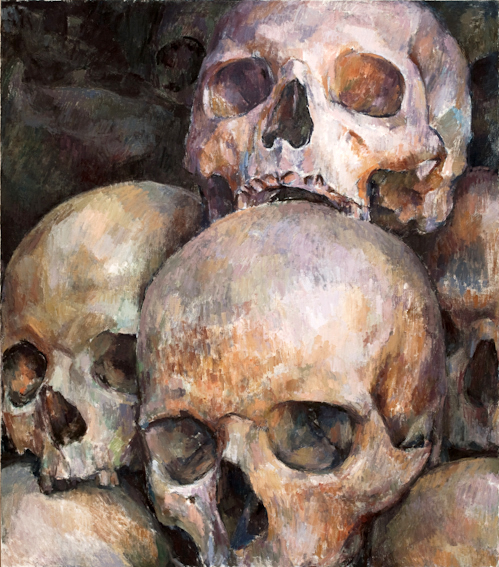
Memento mori, 2004

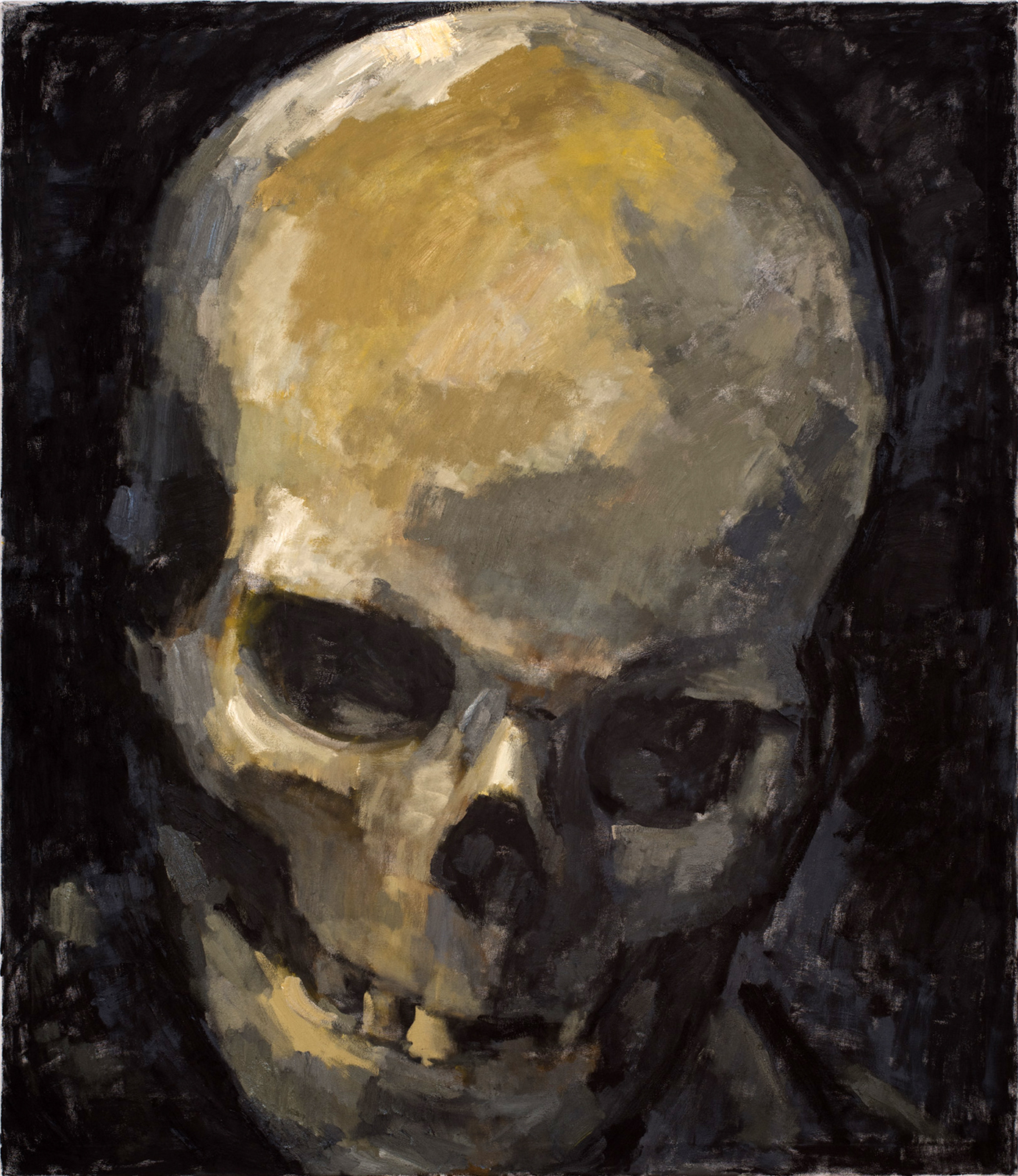
Ego, 2015

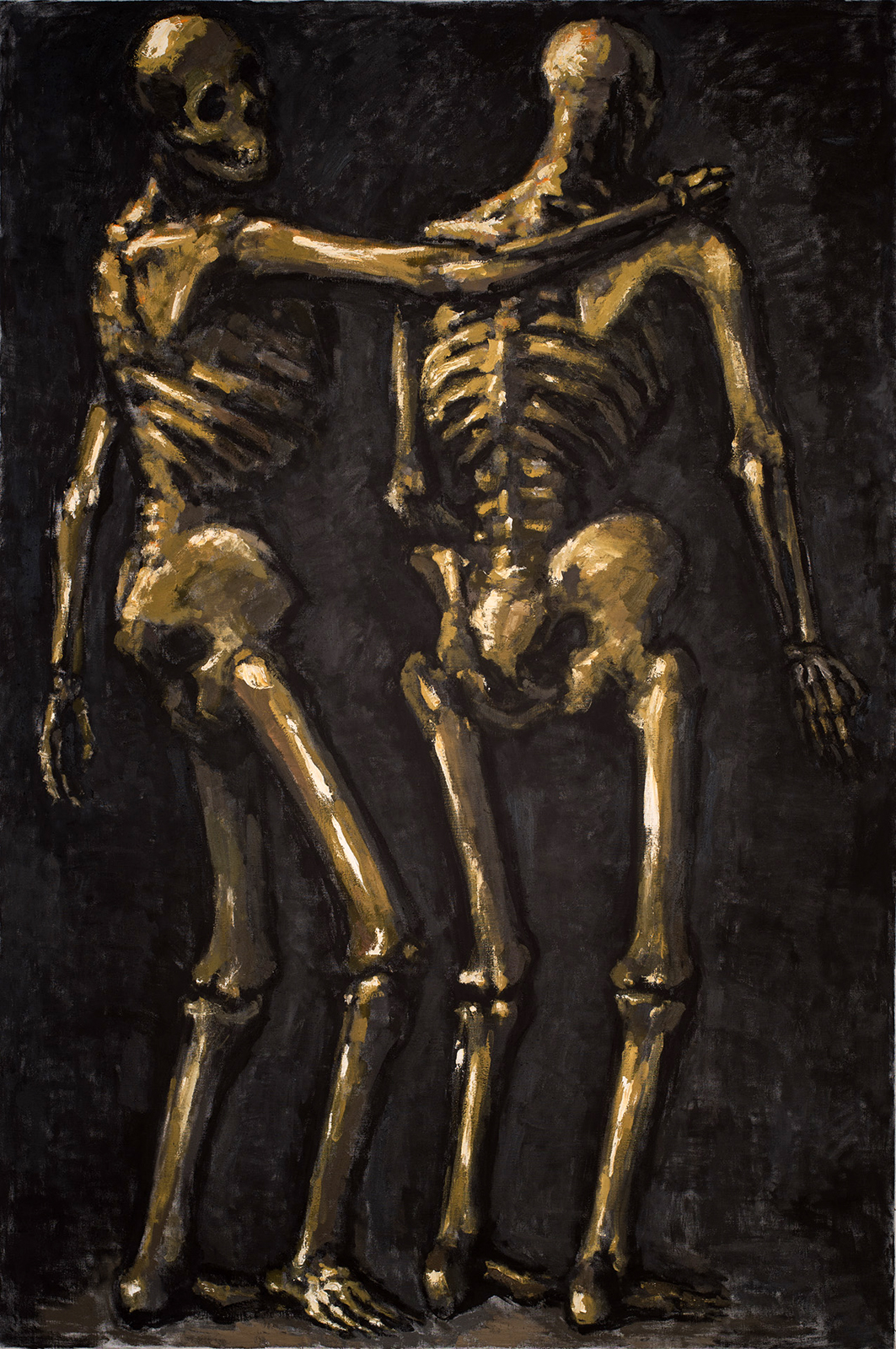
From Nowhere to Nowhere, 2016

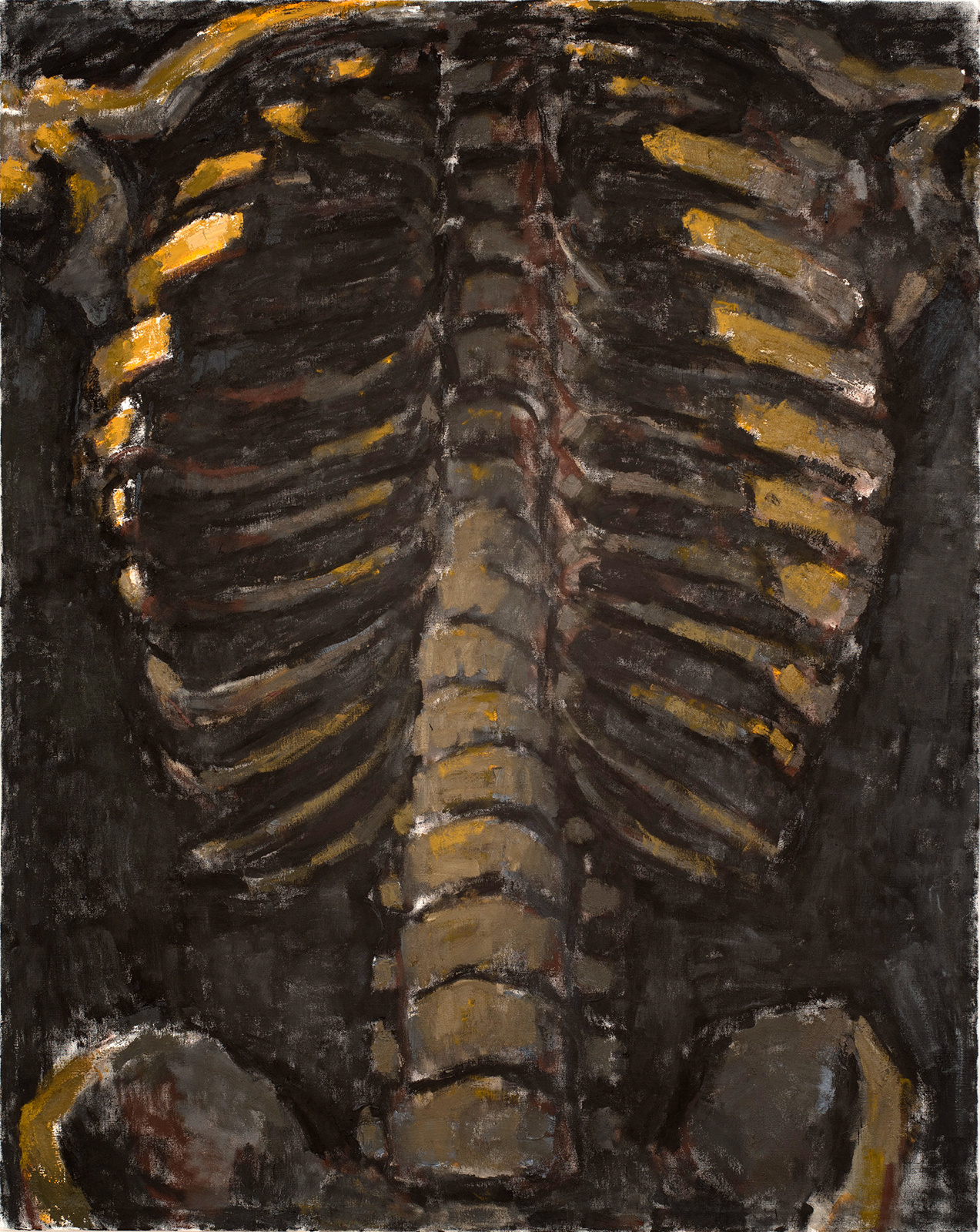
Torso, 2016-2017

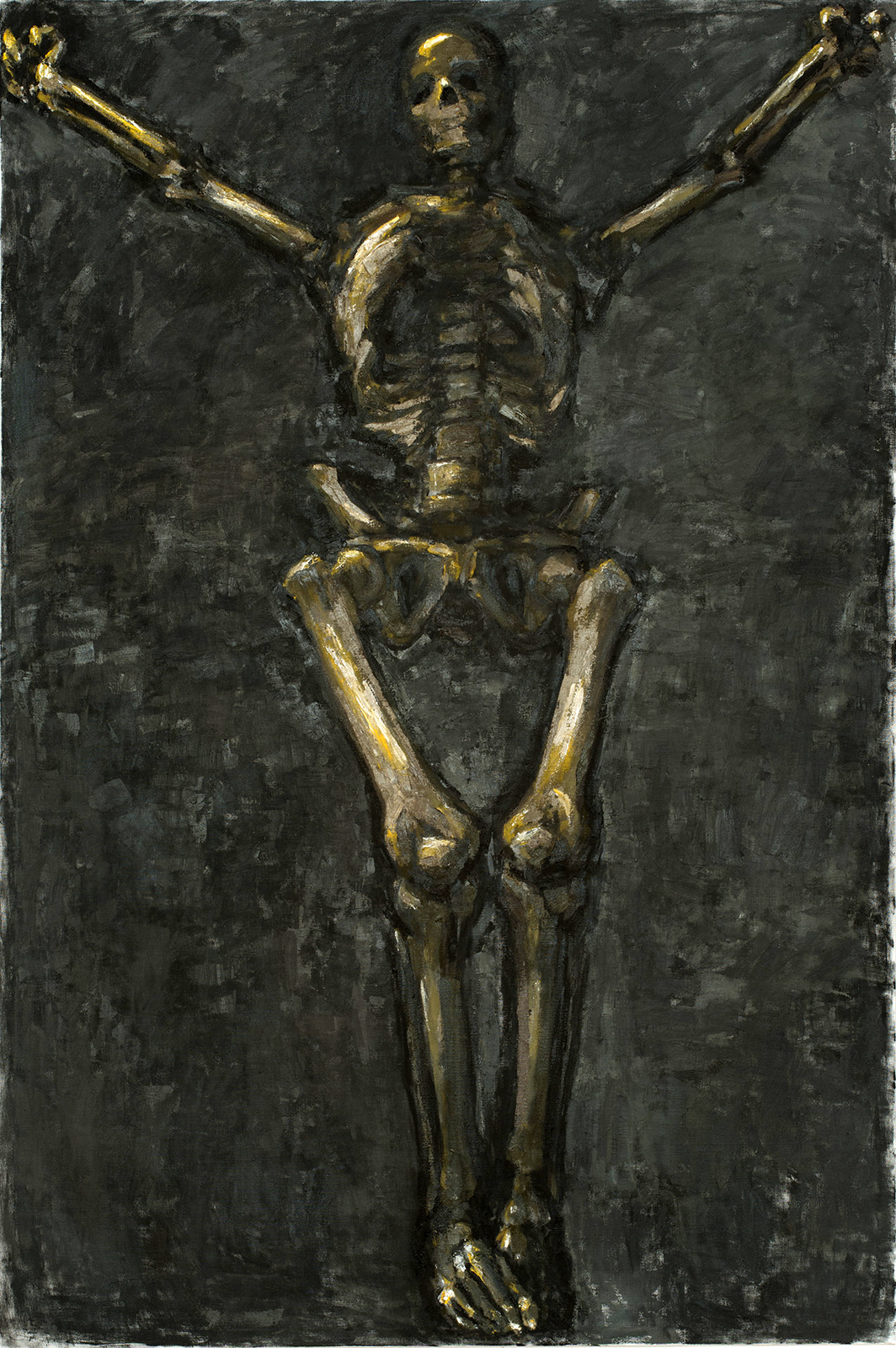
Postponed Case, 2017

Around 2010, Hnízdil worked on a series of paintings entitled Persona – skulls dressed in women's hats and treated as portraits of ladies. This was a step towards a new series of paintings of skulls covered in scarves or veils, which he later expanded upon in the cycle Masquerades (2011). These series, conceived as a kind of exaggeration, marked a shift from the theme of the triumph of death to the theme of portraits of deceased persons in somewhat playful poses, with the possibility of incorporating color. The painter thus continues the lighthearted style of his early paintings from his student days.

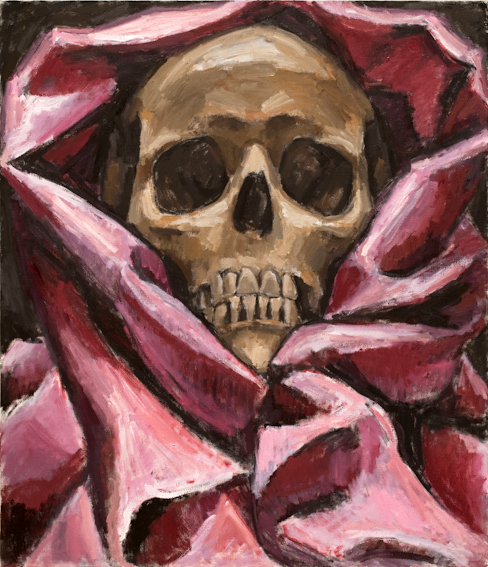
Veiled, 2010

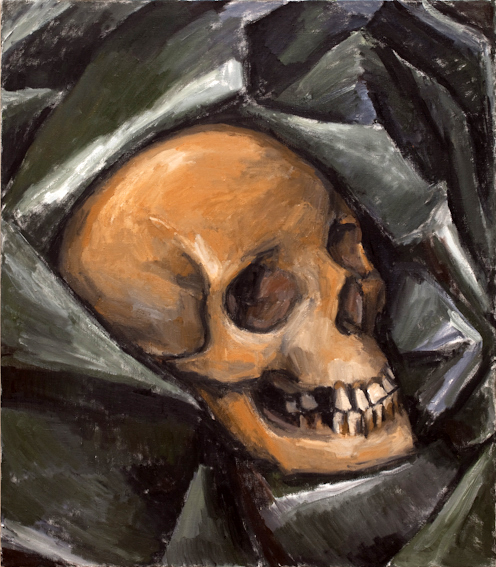
Veiled, 2010

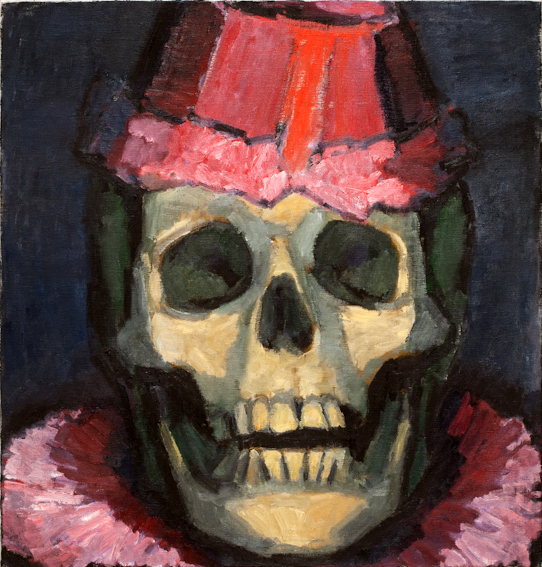
Masquerade, 2011

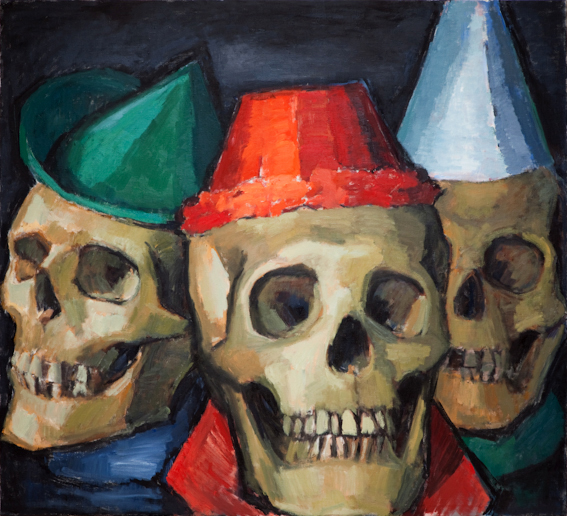
Carnival, 2011

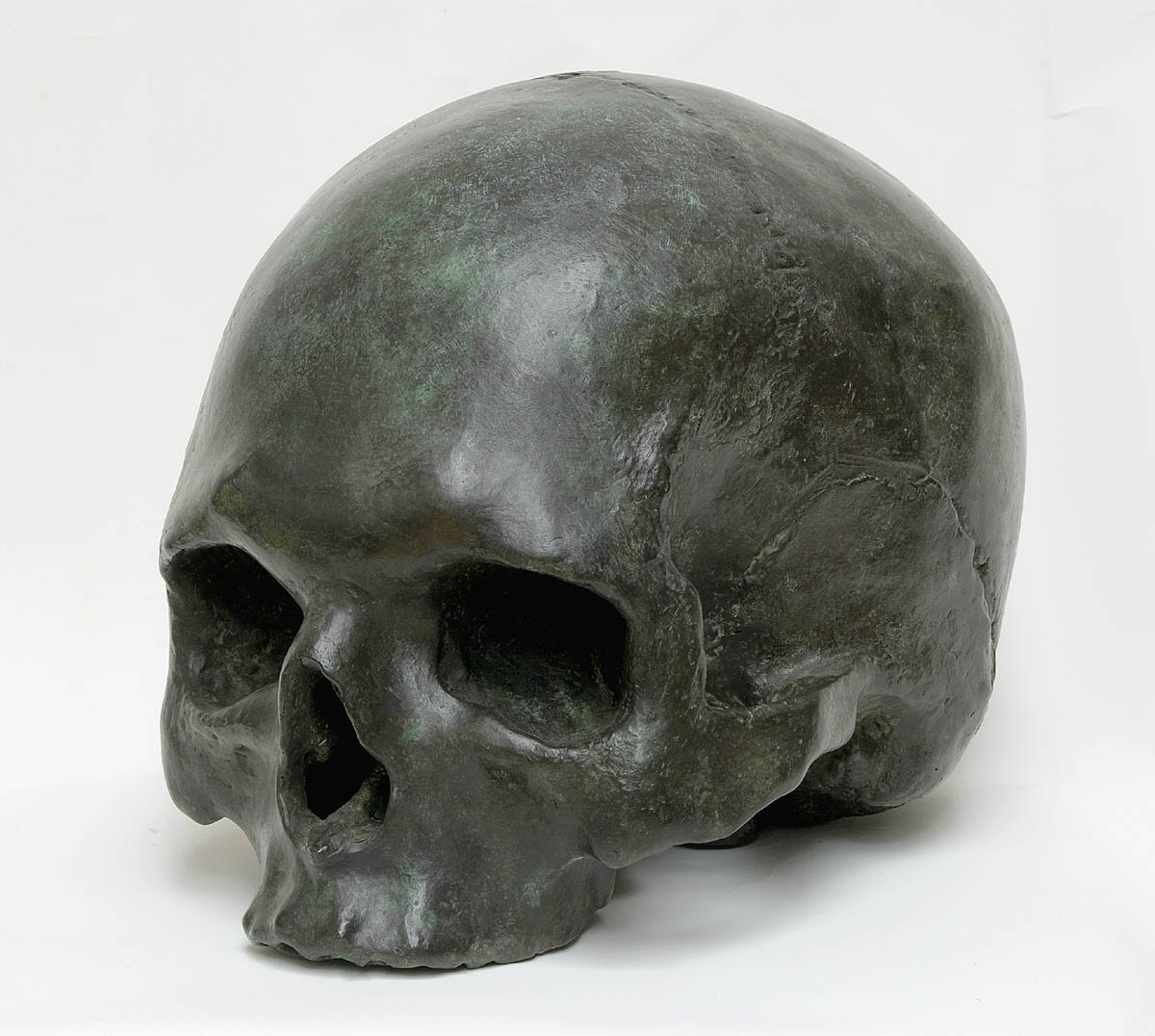
Calva lll, 2006

Since the mid-1990s, Hnízdil has also devoted himself to human portraiture, where his model is usually his wife ("Red Hat," 1998) or someone he knows well (Lenka Reinerová, María Kodama Borges). These expressive portraits are more like psychological studies of people, in which the painter demonstrates an extraordinary sensitivity to color. Along with landscape compositions from the coast of Brittany and Normandy, which offer steep views down between the cliffs to the waves of the sea, Hnízdil presents his other side as a sensitive colorist ("Ile de Groix," 2002, "Étretat," 2003).

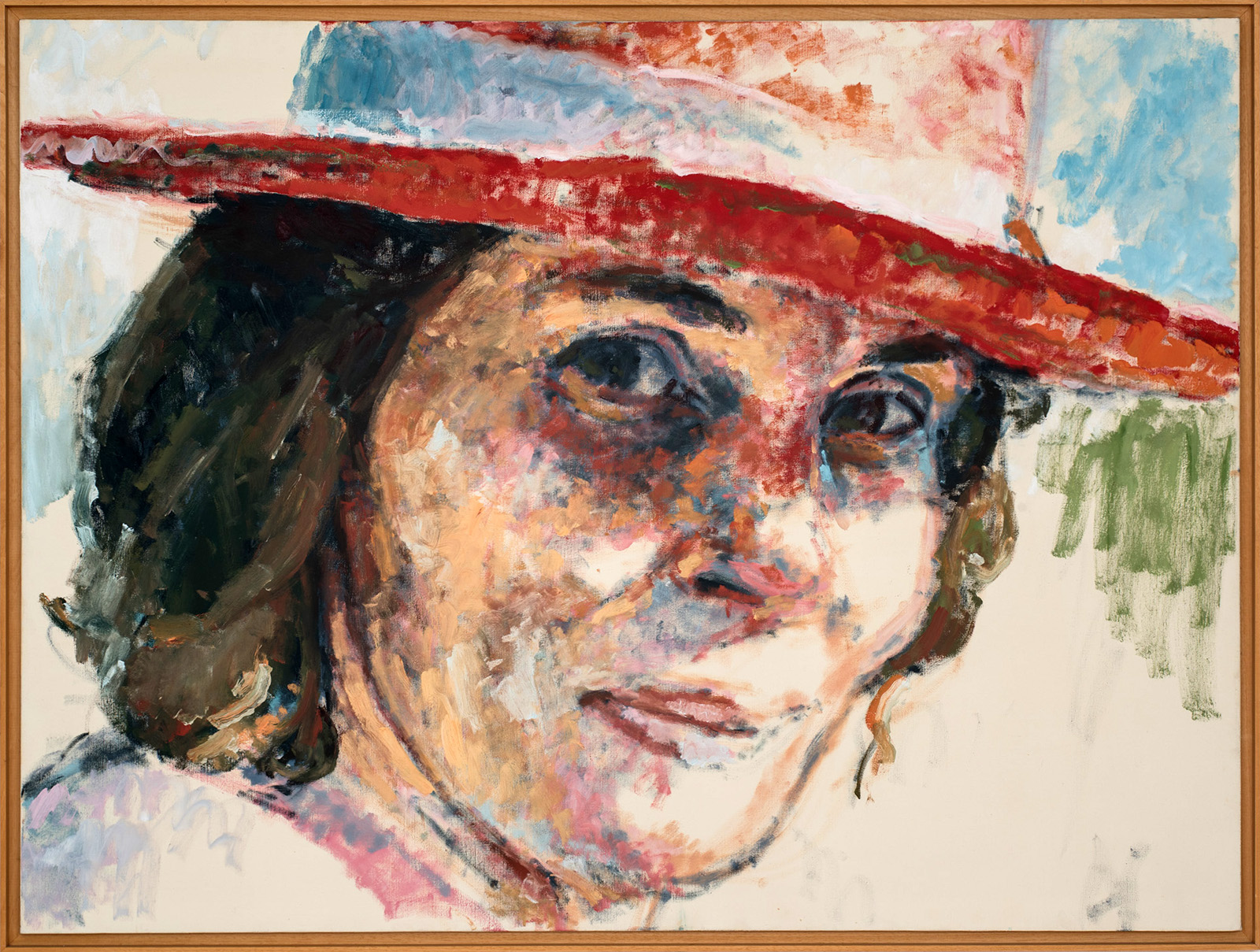
Red hat, 1998

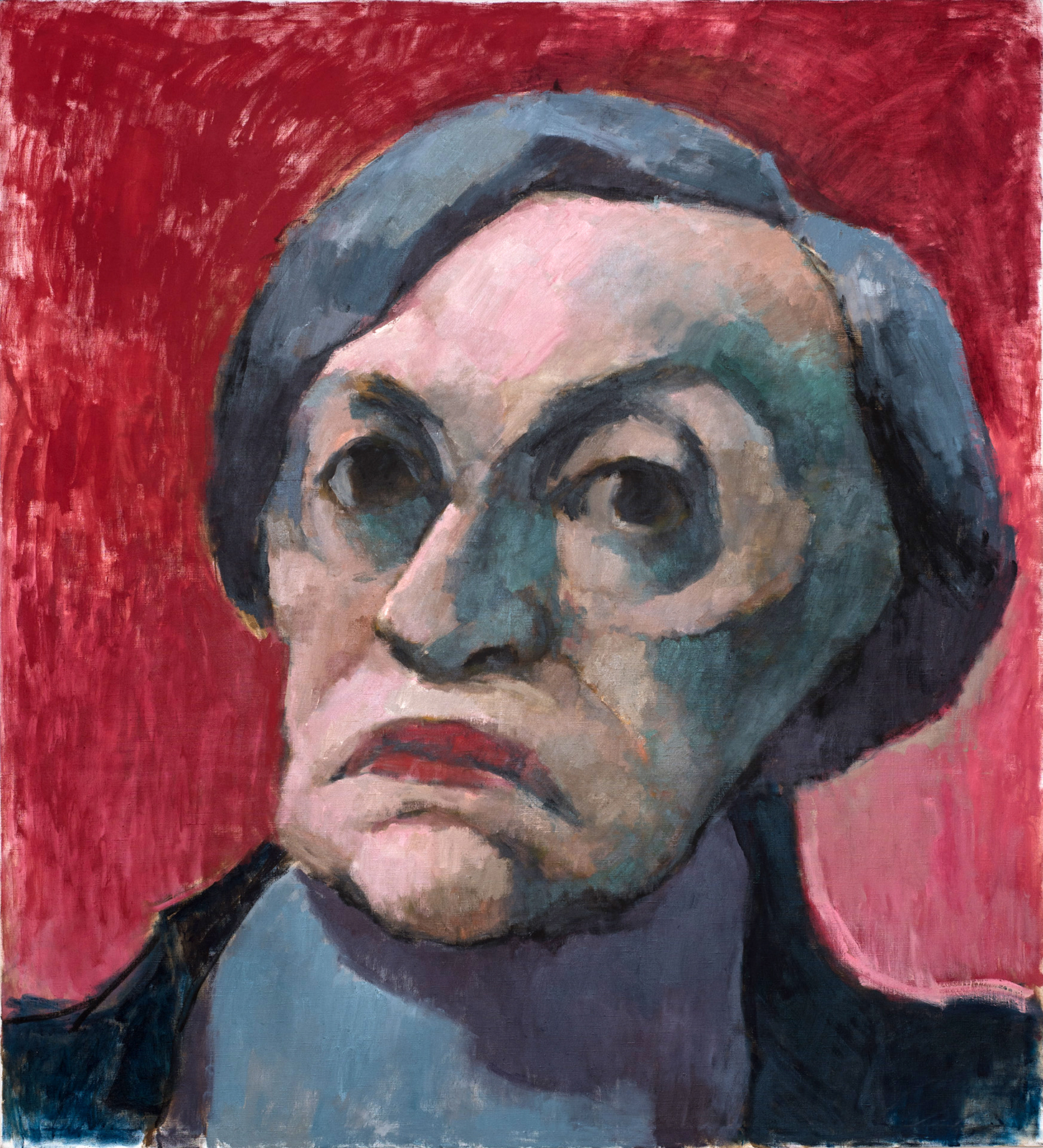
Lenka l, 2008

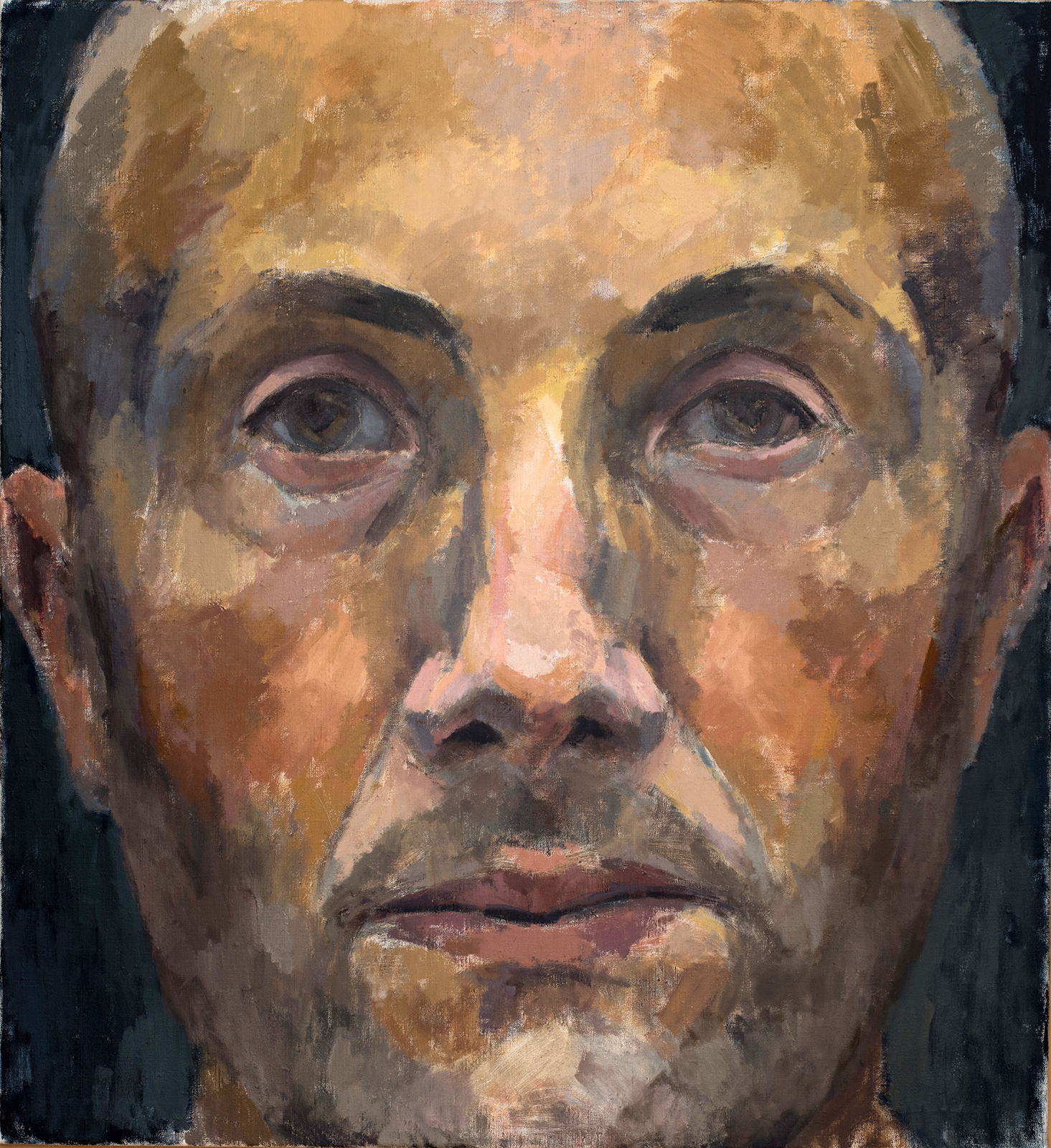
Self-portrait, 2006

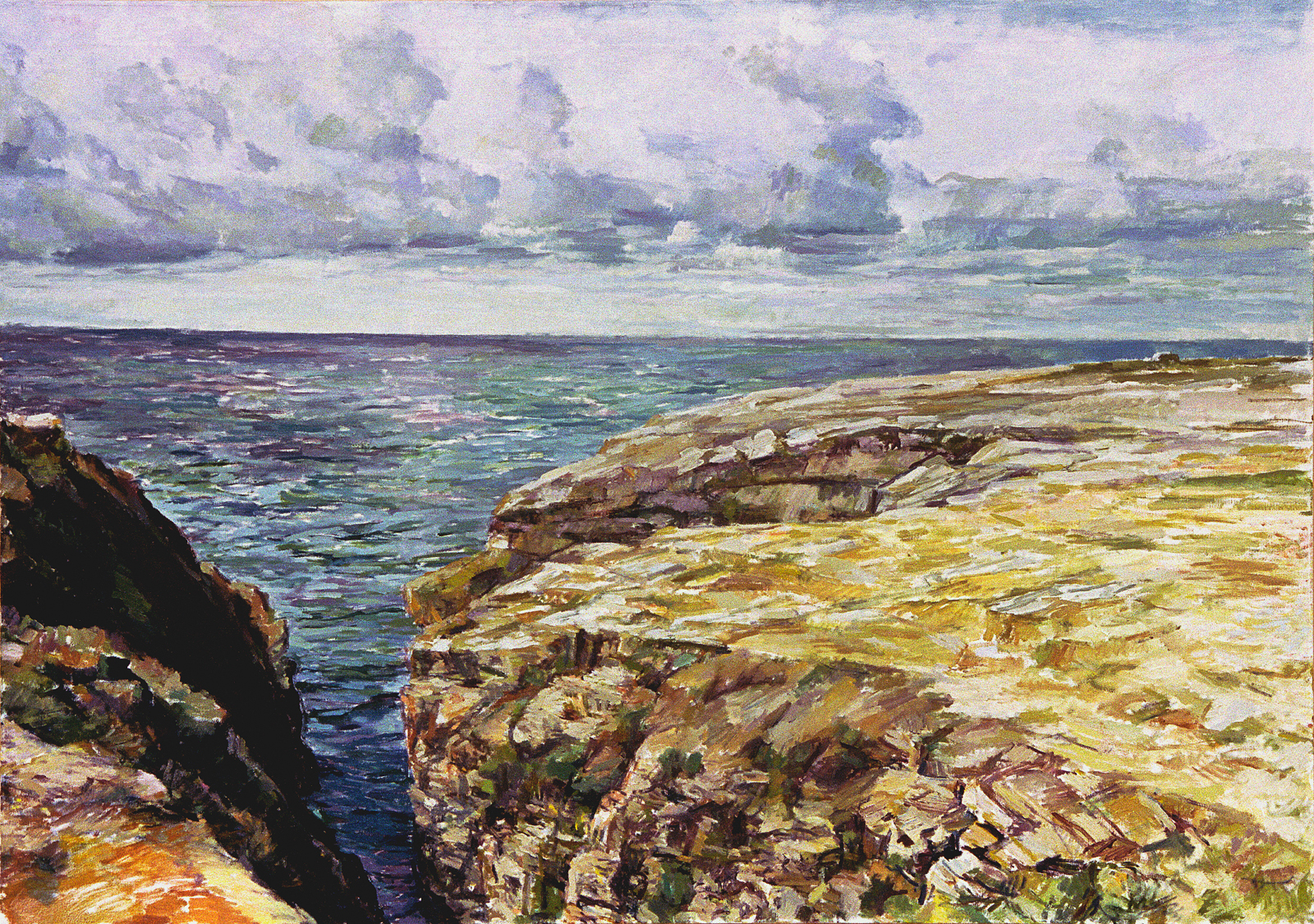
Ile de Groix, 2002

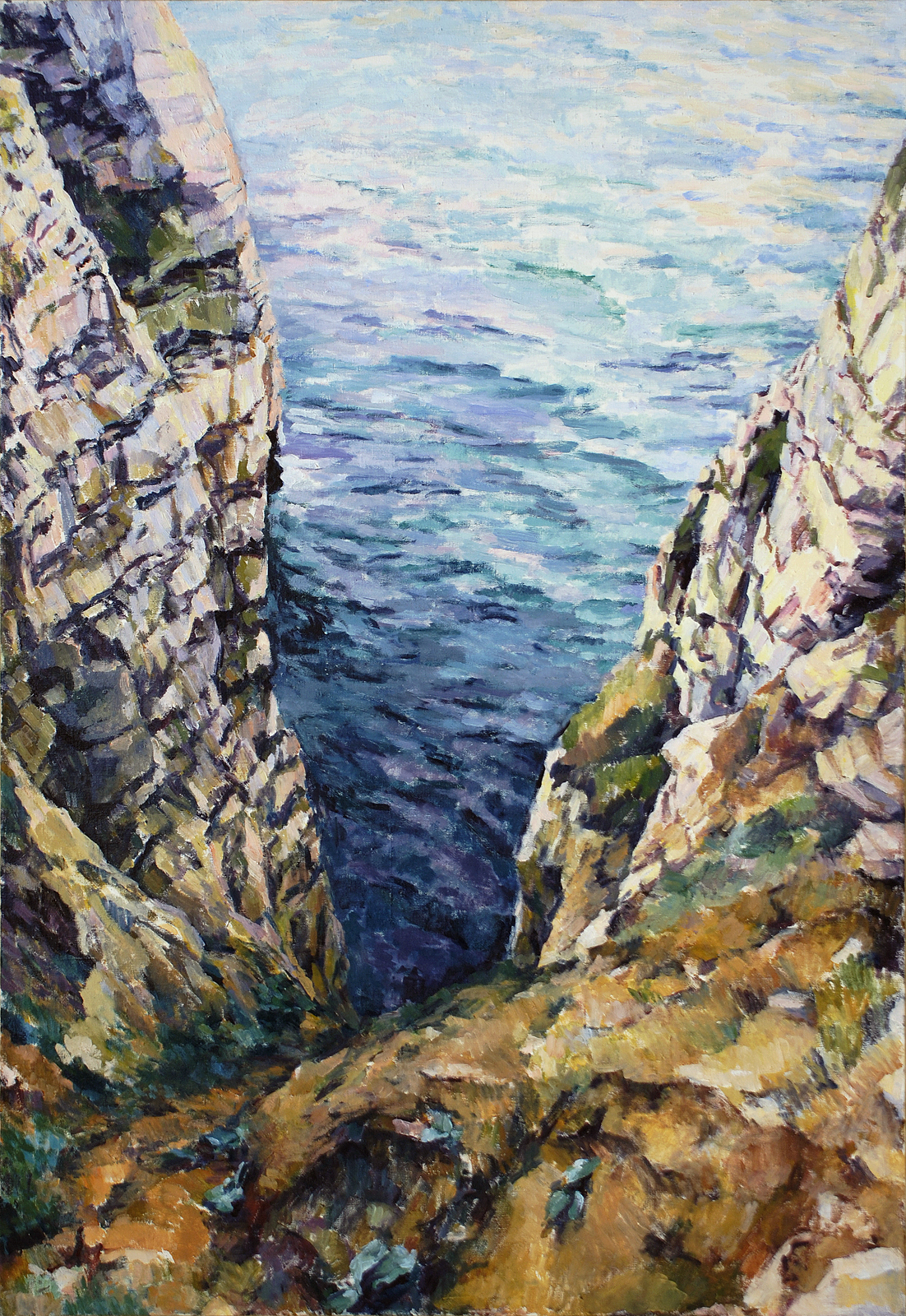
Étretat ll, 2003

The counterpart to these paintings are Hnízdil's skull sculptures – conceived as monumental and deeply felt representations of the theme of death (Calva, 2006). Josef Hnízdil is a solitary figure who, by his means of expression, remains outside the contemporary influences of artistic trends, turning to both old and modern masters and the timeless theme of existence in its finitude.

=== Book illustrations ===
- M. Karagatsis, L’Uomo Con il Polmone e I Polipetti, Edizioni l’Obliquo 1994 (bibliophile edition)
- Arnošt Lustig, Nemilovaná, Franz Kafka Publishing House, Prague 2007
- Arnošt Lustig, Modlitba pro Kateřinu Horovitzovou / A Prayer for Katerina Horovitzova, Franz Kafka Publishing House, Prague 2008 (reproduction of the painting on the cover)
- Arnošt Lustig, Neslušné sny / Indecent dreams, Franz Kafka Publishing House, Prague 2009
- Arnošt Lustig, Darkness Has No Shadow, Franz Kafka Publishing House, Prague 2009
- Arnošt Lustig, Street of Lost Brothers, Franz Kafka Publishing House, Prague 2009
- Arnošt Lustig, Darling, Franz Kafka Publishing House, Prague 2009
- Arnošt Lustig, Diamonds of the Night, Franz Kafka Publishing House, Prague 2010
- Arnošt Lustig, Dita Saxová, Franz Kafka Publishing House, Prague 2010
- Arnošt Lustig, The Abyss, Franz Kafka Publishing House, Prague 2011

=== Representation in collections ===
- GASK – Gallery of the Central Bohemian Region, Kutná Hora
- North Bohemian Gallery of Fine Arts in Litoměřice
- Klatovy/Klenová Gallery
- Felix Jenewein Gallery, Kutná Hora
- Private collections in the Czech Republic, France, Finland, the Netherlands, Germany, Japan, Switzerland, and the United States

=== Exhibitions ===
==== Solo ====
- 1982 Bashu Gallery, Southampton, New York, United States
- 1984 Soho Center, New York, United States, Art Forum, Studio Kausch, Kassel, Germany, VHS Kunststation, Kleinsassen, Germany
- 1985 13 Hour Gallery, New York, United States
- 1987 Now Gallery, New York, United States
- 1990 Galerie mladých, U Řečických, Prague
- 1992 Galerie R, Prague
- 1993 Club 120, Prague, Černá díra, Litera Gallery, Prague
- 1995 Big Theme, Litera Gallery, Prague
- 1996 Ve dvoře Gallery, Veselí nad Moravou
- 1997 Calva, X Centrum, Plzeň, Calva '97, U Kamene Gallery, Cheb
- 1999 Calva, Franz Kafka Gallery, Prague
- 2000 Nový Svět Gallery, Prague
- 2002 Life and Death, Litomyšl Castle
- 2005 Quai des Indes 24, Lorient, France
- 2007 Salon Zentiva, Prague
- 2008 Czech Center Munich, Germany, Efram Gallery, Mikulov, Baroque Niche, Municipal Library, Klatovy
- 2009 Felix Jenewein Gallery, Kutná Hora
- 2010 Return to Painting, Czech Center, Prague
- 2011 Calva, Sýpka Klenová, Klatovy/Klenová Gallery, Doma Gallery, Kyjov
- 2015 In vino vanitas, Viniční altán, Prague
- 2015 Vanitas, Novoměstská radnice, Prague
- 2017 Cold Case, Gallery of the Central Bohemian Region in Kutná Hora

==== Collective (selection) ====
- 1993 Komorní plastika / A chamber sculpture, Mánes, Prague
- 1994 Vyšehrad ´94, Vyšehrad, Gorlice, Prague
- 1995 Nové sdružení pražských umělců: Konstanty / New association of prague artists: Constants, Bazilika sv. Vavřince, Prague
- 1997 Co je na míse / What's on the plate, Galerie Litera, Prague
- 1999 Hommage a Franz Kafka, Kulturforum im Kulturhaus ´abraxas´, Augsburg, Tančící dům, Prague
- 2000 Dva konce století 1900 2000 / Two Ends of the Century 1900 2000, House of the Black Madonna, Prague
- 2002 Mánes ve mlýnici / Mánes in the mill, Löwitův mlýn, Prague
- 2003 Přátelé pro Literu / Friends for Litera, Pražský dům fotografie, Nadace ABF, Prague
- 2003 Asociace a paralely / Associations and parallels, Galerie Caesar, Olomouc
- 2003 Krajina domova třetího tisíciletí / Landscape of the Third Millennium, Art Critics Gallery, Prague
- 2005 Členská výstava Spolku výtvarných umělců Mánes A-J / Member exhibition of the Mánes Association of Fine Artists A-J, Diamant Gallery, Prague
- 2005 Pražské ateliéry / Prague studios, New Town Hall, Prague
- 2007 Jubilanti Mánesa 2007 / Mánes Jubilees 2007, Galerie Diamant, Prague
- 2009 S.V.U. Mánes – Ohlédnutí / Looking back, Galerie Slovenské výtvarné únie, Bratislava
- 2010 X. ročník Symposia Jenewein / 10th Jenewein Symposium, Kutná Hora
- 2010 Beroun Lughnasadh 2010. Co dělat, aby nám nebe nespadlo na hlavu / What to do to prevent the sky from falling on our heads, Museum of the Bohemian Karst, Beroun
- 2011 Galerie Litera, rok dvacátý, 1991 – 2011 / Litera Gallery, twentieth year, 1991–2011, Litera Gallery, Prague
- 2011 Nablízko a nadostřel / Close by and within range, Sýpka Klenová, Klenová
- 2012 Volný směr / Free direction, S.V.U. Mánes, SGVU Litoměřice
- 2013 Proces na zámku / Trial at the castle, Volné sdružení M, Kvasiny Castle
- 2013 Proces v Mánesově / The trial in Mánes, Volné sdružení M, galerie Mánesova 54
- 2014 Tělo - Znak / Body - Symbol, Volné sdružení M, Rabasova galerie Rakovník
- 2015 Volné sdružení M v Synagoze, Synagoga Palmovka, Prague
- 2018 Stavy mysli / Za obrazem / States of Mind / Beyond the Image (Obměny a intervence / Interventions and Innovations), Gallery of the Central Bohemian Region (GASK), Kutná Hora
- 2020 Finis Terrae (Bretaň českým pohledem / Czech views of Brittany), North Bohemian Gallery of Fine Arts in Litoměřice
- 2020 Máchovskou krajinou / The landscape of Mácha, North Bohemian Gallery of Fine Arts in Litoměřice
- 2020 Poutník, jenž se vrací / The pilgrim who returns (An exhibition by members and guests of the Fine Art Section of Umělecká beseda), North Bohemian Gallery of Fine Arts in Litoměřice
- 2021 Vanitas (Vanitas in Contemporary Czech Art), DOX, Centre for Contemporary Art, Prague

== Sources ==
=== Catalogs ===
- Brothers Josef and Aleš Hnízdil: New York-Prague Confrontation, cat. 8 pp., Union of Fine Artists, Prague 1990
- Josef Hnízdil, 1998, Neumannová Švaňková Eva, cat. 24 pp., Studio 3P, Prague
- Josef Ryzec, Vyšehrad - Lughnasadh '98, exhibition of works of art, collective cat., Vyšehrad Gallery, Echo Theater Agency, Vyšehrad National Cultural Monument
- Josef Hnízdil: Calva, 1999, Anna Janištinová, Franz Kafka Gallery, Prague 1999
- Landscape of the Third Millennium, S.V.U. Mánes magazine, 12/2003
- Caesar No. 135, Associations and Parallels, text by Jiří Hůla, 2003
- Jubilanti Mánesa, S.V.U. Mánes magazine 2007
- Nablízko a nadostřel, Calva Josef Hnízdil, Klatovy / Klenová Gallery May 15 – June 26, 2011
- Free Current: A Meeting for Members of the Mánes Association of Fine Artists to Mark the 125th Anniversary of its Founding, Kotalík Jiří Tomáš, Špale Václav, Štíbr Jan, cat. 76 pp., North Bohemian Gallery of Fine Arts in Litoměřice 2012
- The Trial at Mánes, in the series Catalogs – Mánes Gallery 54, Free Association M, Prague 2013
- Body - Symbol: Free Association M, cat. 88 pp., Rabas Gallery, Rakovník 2014. ISBN 978-80-87406-37-3
- Free Association M in the Synagogue, Synagogue in Palmovka, Prague 2015
- Josef Hnízdil: A Postponed Case, Primusová Adriana, Central Bohemian Region Gallery in Kutná Hora 2017

=== Articles ===
- Petr Volf, Master of Skulls, Reflex, no. 31, 1995
- Renata Fryšarová, Josef Hnízdil: An Artist Must Be Stronger Than the Subject, Týdeník rozhlas 9, 1996
- Anna Janištinová, Josef Hnízdil – Calva, Ateliér no. 21, 1999
- Jana Komárková, You Don't Have to Think About Death Above a Skull, Týdeník rozhlas, October 4–10, 1999
- Jiří T. Kotalík, Mánes in the Mill, listy S.V.U. Mánes, no. 1-2, 2002
- Jan Kříž, Josef Hnízdil – Life and Death, Atelier No. 24, 2002
- Un peintrte tcheque au quai des Indes, Quest-France, October 6, 2005
- Aleš Rezler, Josef Hnízdil – Paintings, Sculptures, Atelier No. 25–26, 2009
- Anna Janištinová, Paintings by Josef Hnízdil, Man as a Major Theme, Prestige 2015, pp. 52–54
