= A Prayer for Katerina Horovitzova =

- Directed by: Antonín Moskalyk
- Written by: Arnošt Lustig; Vladislav Čejchan
- Starring: Jiří Adamíra; Martin Růžek; Lenka Fišerová
- Cinematography: Jiří Kadaňka
- Edited by: Jan Chaloupek
- Music by: Luboš Fišer
- Release date: 1965
- Running time: 67 minutes
- Country: Czechoslovakia
- Language: Czech

A Prayer for Katerina Horovitzova (Czech: Modlitba pro Kateřinu Horovitzovou) is a 1965 Czech television film about a young Jewish woman during World War II. It is based on Arnošt Lustig's novel of the same name.

== Production ==
It is an adaptation of Arnošt Lustig's short novel first published in 1964. Lustig's novel is inspired by two real stories, one about American Jewish businessmen captured in Europe and the other one about Franceska Mann.

== Plot ==
In 1943 a young Jewish woman Kateřina Horovitzová is placed in a group of wealthy Jewish men who bribe the Nazis in order to be exchanged to USA for captured SS officers.

== Cast ==
- Jiří Adamíra as Bedřich Branske
- Martin Růžek as Herrmann Cohen
- Lenka Fišerová as Kateřina Horovitzová
- Miloš Nedbal as Łódź rabbi Dajem
- Čestmír Řanda as Ludvík Rappaport
- Ilja Prachař as Oskar Löwenstein
- Felix le Breux as Valter Taubenstock
- Vladimír Ráž as Freddy Klarfeld
- Vladimír Hlavatý as Hugo Varacky
- Otto Šimánek as Tailor

== Awards ==
- International Critics Prize at 1965 Prix Italia
- Golden Nymph at 1965 Monte-Carlo Television Festival
