= Happy Valley (film) =

2014 documentary film directed by Amir Bar-Lev

- Poster
- Directed by: Amir Bar-Lev
- Written by: Amir Bar-Lev
- Produced by: John Battsek; Ken Dornstein; Jonathan Koch; Steven Michaels
- Cinematography: Nelson Hume; Sean Kirby
- Edited by: Brian Funck; Dan Swietlik; David Zieff
- Music by: H. Scott Salinas
- Production companies: A&E IndieFilms; Asylum Entertainment; Passion Pictures
- Release date: January 19, 2014 (Sundance Film Festival)
- Running time: 98 minutes
- Country: United States
- Language: English

Happy Valley is a 2014 American documentary film, written and directed by Amir Bar-Lev. The film had its world premiere at 2014 Sundance Film Festival on January 19, 2014.

The film later screened at 2014 Sarasota Film Festival and won the jury award at the festival.

== Synopsis ==
The film narrates the event at The Pennsylvania State University, when in November 2011 the former long-time defensive coordinator of school's football team, Jerry Sandusky, was charged with 40 counts of child sex abuse, setting off a firestorm of accusations about who failed to protect the children.

== Reception ==
Happy Valley received positive reviews from critics. Justin Chang of Variety said in his review that "Amir Bar-Lev offers a typically gripping and thoughtful take on the Penn State scandal." John DeFore, in his review for The Hollywood Reporter, praised the film, saying that "Amir Bar-Lev's Happy Valley is more concerned with the phenomenon of team spirit than any single question of fact or moral judgment." Eric Kohn Vaughan of Indiewire graded the film with a B+ and said, "Happy Valley turns the tables on the national perception of the scandal. Looking directly into the camera after the team has been banned by the league, one supporter shouts, 'Stop putting all the bad stuff on TV!' The words resonate for anyone who has followed the headlines from the past several years. Watching Happy Valley, it's hard not to feel complicit in the university's weakened state."

== Accolades ==
Year	Award	Category	Recipient	Result
2014	Sarasota Film Festival	Best Documentary Feature - Jury Prize	Amir Bar-Lev	Won

== See also ==
- List of American football films
