= The Tillman Story =

- Directed by: Amir Bar-Lev
- Written by: Amir Bar-Lev; Joe Bini; Mark Monroe
- Produced by: John Battsek
- Narrated by: Josh Brolin
- Cinematography: Sean Kirby; Igor Martinovic
- Edited by: Joshua Altman; Joe Bini; Gabriel Rhodes
- Music by: Philip Sheppard
- Production companies: Passion Pictures; Axis Films
- Distributed by: The Weinstein Company
- Release dates: January 23, 2010 (Sundance); August 20, 2010 (United States)
- Running time: 94 minutes
- Country: United States
- Language: English
- Box office: $798,940

The Tillman Story is a 2010 American documentary film directed by Amir Bar-Lev and narrated by Josh Brolin. It is about the death of professional-football-player-turned-Army-Ranger Pat Tillman in the War in Afghanistan, the coverup of the circumstances of his death, and his family's struggle to unearth the truth. The film was nominated for the Grand Jury Prize at the 2010 Sundance Film Festival, and it was named the Best Documentary of 2010 by the San Francisco Film Critics Circle, the St. Louis Gateway Film Critics Association, and the Florida Film Critics Circle, as well as one of the Top Five Documentaries of the year by the National Board of Review.

== Synopsis ==
Pat Tillman was a defensive back with the Arizona Cardinals in 2002, but he decided to walk away from his multimillion-dollar contract to join the Army and fight in Afghanistan. Although he and his younger brother Kevin were first deployed to Iraq, they were later sent to Afghanistan, where Pat died. It was initially reported that he was killed by enemy combatants, but, a month later, it was stated that he had been killed by friendly fire during an enemy ambush.

Pat's family, particularly his mother, Mary (also known as "Dannie"), worked to make sense out of the 3,000 pages of redacted documents they were given by the military and came to the conclusion that Pat's death seems to have been the tragic result of a series of unfortunate events that did not involve enemy forces. After this, they pushed various entities of the government to investigate and admit that the initial descriptions of Pat's death were intentionally manufactured as propaganda. A paper trail, which includes a leaked top-secret document known as a P4 Memo that was sent by Gen. Stanley A. McChrystal, indicates that blame for the deception extends all the way to the Bush White House.

== Production ==
Bar-Lev began work on the documentary in 2007 during the congressional hearings on the incident. He had to ask the Tillman family for their cooperation for seven months before they agreed to participate.

== Reception ==
On review aggregator website Rotten Tomatoes, the film has a 94% approval rating based on 88 reviews, with an average score of 8.2/10; the site's "critics consensus" states: "Passionate, angry, and insightful, The Tillman Story offers a revealing portrait of its subject's inspiring life and untimely death." On Metacritic, it has a weighted average score of 86/100 based on reviews from 28 critics, indicating "universal acclaim".

Peter Travers of Rolling Stone wrote: "This documentary succeeds triumphantly on so many levels that its full impact doesn't hit you until you have time to register its aftershocks [...] it will get under your skin." Ann Hornaday of The Washington Post gave the film three-and-a-half out of four stars, calling it "masterful" and "unsettling." Owen Gleiberman of Entertainment Weekly gave it a B+ and called it "morally incisive."
