= Fighter (2000 film) =

2000 film by Amir Bar-Lev

- Directed by: Amir Bar-Lev
- Starring: Jan Wiener; Arnošt Lustig
- Distributed by: First Run Features
- Release date: 2000
- Running time: 91 minutes

Fighter is a documentary film about Arnošt Lustig (1926–2011) and Jan Wiener (1920–2010), two Jews who return to Europe to revisit the past.

A survivor of Theresienstadt, Auschwitz, and Buchenwald, Lustig was a Prague-based journalist and author. The German-born Wiener escaped from Nazi-occupied Czechoslovakia, and joined the Royal Air Force in Italy. The film retraces Wiener's escape route, and visits Theresienstadt (where Wiener's mother died), Auschwitz, and Buchenwald. It received a Special Jury Citation in the 2000 Karlovy Vary International Film Festival, Best Documentary at the Newport International Film Festival, and the audience award at the Hamptons International Film Festival.
