= Arnošt Lustig =

Czech Jewish writer (1926–2011)

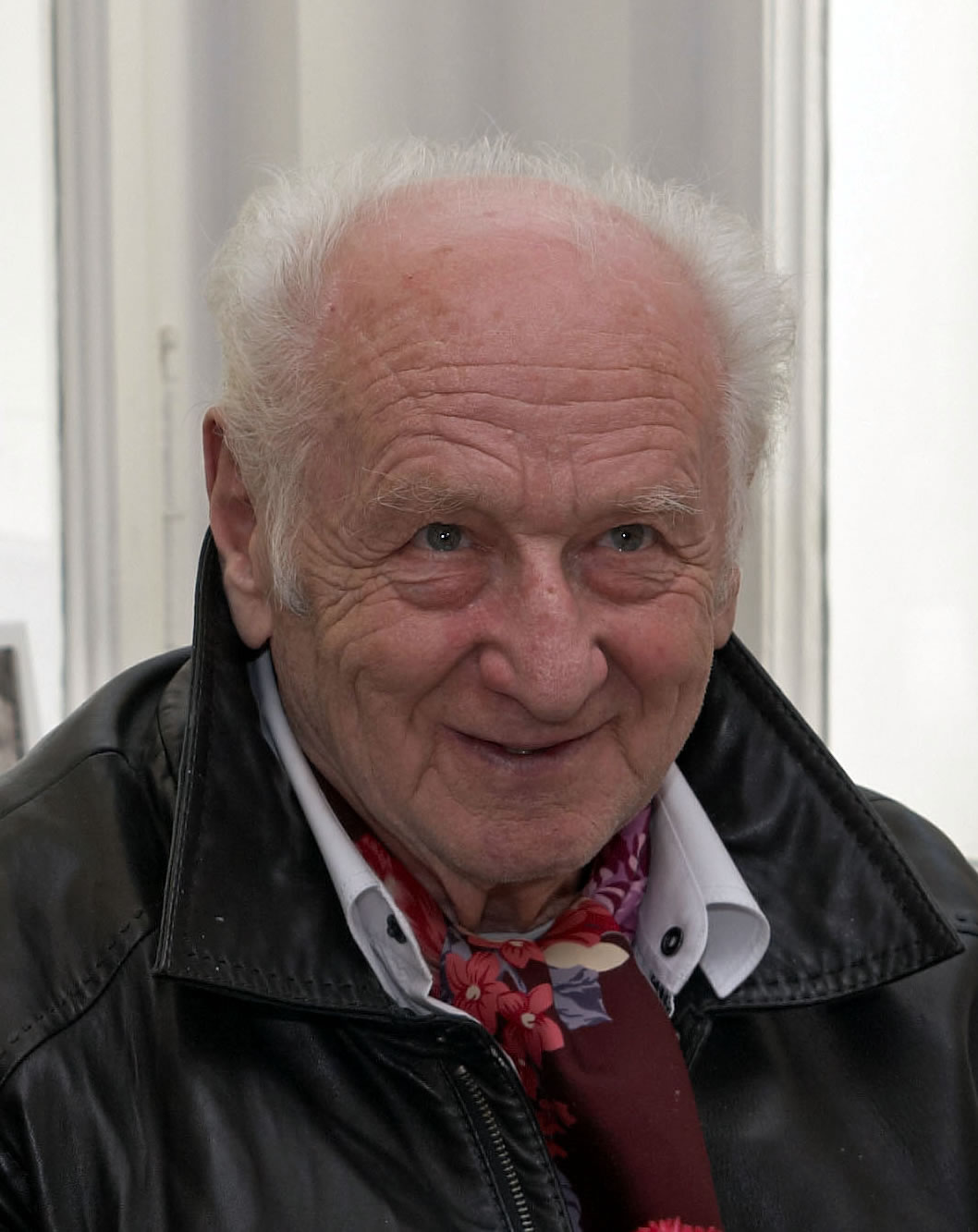
- Lustig in 2009
- Born: 21 December 1926; Prague, Czechoslovakia
- Died: 26 February 2011 (aged 84); Prague, Czech Republic
- Education: Journalism
- Alma mater: Charles University
- Occupation: Writer
- Notable work: A Prayer For Katerina Horowitzowa, Dita Saxová, Night and Hope, Lovely Green Eyes
- Spouse: Věra Weislitzová
- Children: 2
- Awards: Franz Kafka Prize (2008); Karel Čapek Prize (1996); National Jewish Book Award for Dita Saxová (1980); The Unloved: From the Diary of Perla S. (1986)

Arnošt Lustig (Czech pronunciation: [ˈarnoʃt ˈlustɪk]; 21 December 1926 – 26 February 2011) was a Czech Jewish writer, playwright and screenwriter. His works have often involved the Holocaust.

== Life and work ==
Lustig was born in Prague. As a Jewish boy in Czechoslovakia during World War II, he was sent in 1942 to the Theresienstadt concentration camp, from where he was later transported to the Auschwitz concentration camp, followed by time in the Buchenwald concentration camp. In 1945, he escaped from a train carrying him to the Dachau concentration camp when the engine was destroyed by an American fighter-bomber. He returned to Prague in time to take part in the May 1945 uprising against the German occupation.

After the war, he studied journalism at Charles University in Prague and then worked for a number of years at Radio Prague. He worked as a journalist in Israel at the time of its War of Independence where he met his future wife, who at the time was a volunteer with the Haganah. He was one of the major critics of the Communist regime in June 1967 at the 4th Writers Conference, and gave up his membership in the Communist Party after the 1967 Middle East war, to protest his government's breaking of relations with Israel. However, following the Soviet-led invasion that ended the Prague Spring in 1968, he left the country, first to Yugoslavia, then Israel and later in 1970 to the United States. He spent the academic year 1970-1971 as a scholar in the International Writing Program at the University of Iowa. After the fall of the communist regime in Czechoslovakia in 1989, he divided his time between Prague and Washington, D.C., where he continued to teach at the American University. After his retirement from the American University in 2003, he became a full-time resident of Prague. He was given an apartment in the Prague Castle by then President Václav Havel and honored for his contributions to Czech culture on his 80th birthday in 2006. In 2008, Lustig became the eighth recipient of the Franz Kafka Prize, and the third recipient of the Karel Čapek Prize in 1996.

Lustig was married to Věra Weislitzová (1927-2009), daughter of a furniture maker from Ostrava who was also imprisoned in the Terezín concentration camp. Unlike her parents, she was not deported to Auschwitz. She wrote of her family's fate during the Holocaust in the collection of poems entitled "Daughter of Olga and Leo." They have two children, Josef (1951) and Eva (1956).

Lustig died at age 84 in Prague on 26 February 2011 after suffering from Hodgkin lymphoma for five years.

His most renowned books are A Prayer For Katerina Horowitzowa (published and nominated for a National Book Award in 1974), Dita Saxová (1962, trans. 1979 as Dita Saxova), Night and Hope (1957, trans. 1985), and Lovely Green Eyes (2004).

== Selected books ==
- Night and Hope (1957) – adapted into the film Transport from Paradise (1962)
- Diamonds of the Night (1958) – contains the short story "Darkness Casts No Shadow", which was adapted into the film Diamonds of the Night (1964)
- Street of Lost Brothers (1959)
- Dita Saxová (1962)
- Transport from Paradise (1962)
- A Prayer for Kateřina Horovitzová (1964) – adapted into the TV film A Prayer for Katerina Horovitzova (1965)
- The Bitter Smell of Almonds (1968)
- The Unloved: From the Diary of Perla S. (1979)
- Waiting for Leah (1992)
- The House of Returned Echoes (1994)
- Lovely Green Eyes: A Novel (2000)

== Awards ==
- 1980: National Jewish Book Award for Dita Saxová
- 1986: National Jewish Book Award for The Unloved: From the Diary of Perla S.

== See also ==
- Transport from Paradise, a 1962 movie based on Lustig's novel
- Diamonds of the Night, a 1964 movie based on Lustig's short story
- A Prayer for Katerina Horovitzova, a 1965 movie based on Lustig's novel
- Dita Saxová, a 1967 movie based on Lustig's novel
- Fighter, a 2000 documentary film about Lustig
