= Amir Bar-Lev =

American film director

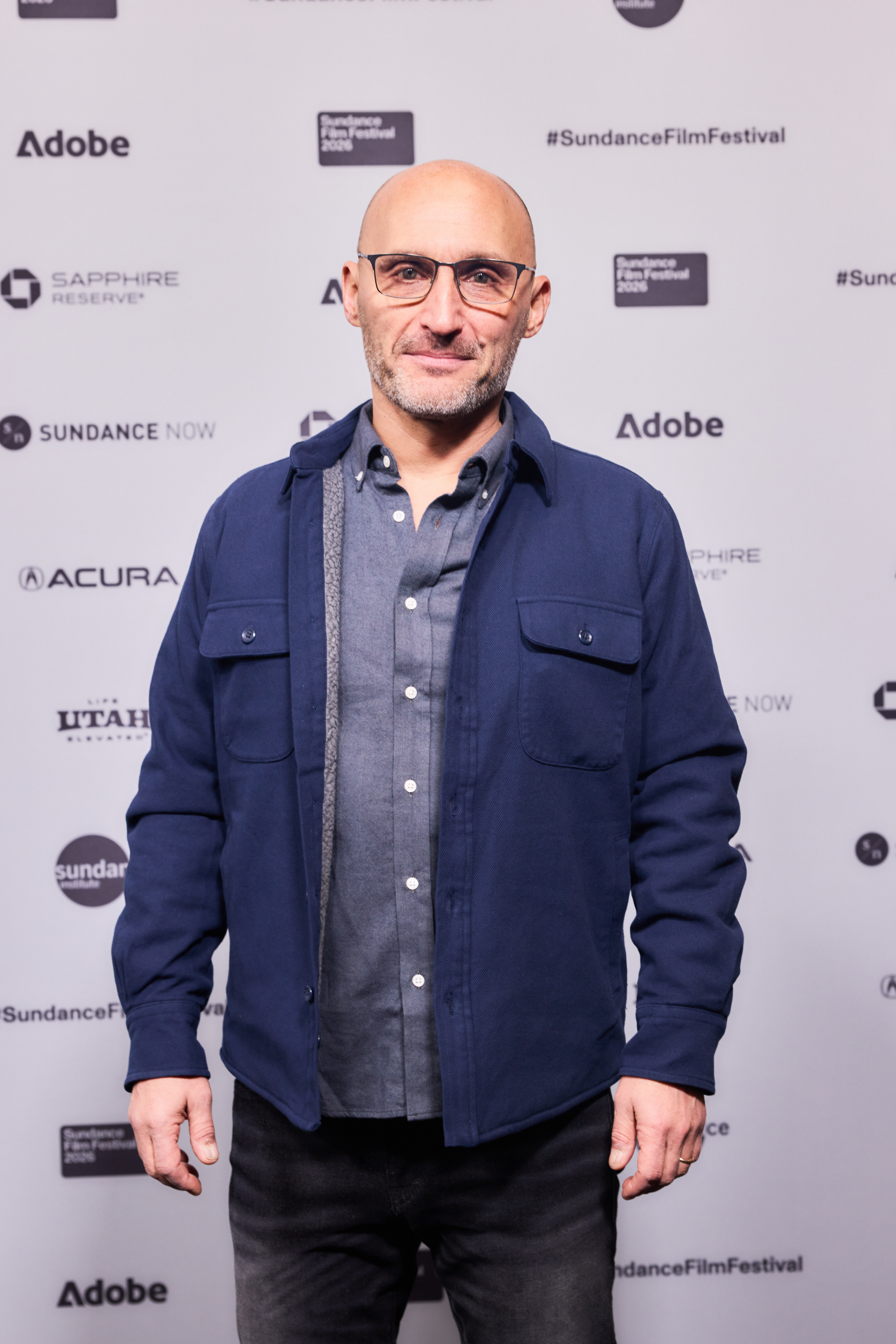
- Born: 1972 (age 53–54)

Amir Bar-Lev (born 1972) is an American documentary film director. He has directed films such as his debut Fighter and The Tillman Story.

== Career ==
His 2000 debut film Fighter, about two Holocaust survivors, was named one of the top documentaries of the year by Rolling Stone and was praised by The Village Voice. The London Telegraph named Bar-Lev’s second film, My Kid Could Paint That, one of the top 100 films of all time.

Bar-Lev's 2013 film Happy Valley premiered at Sundance 2014 and was released theatrically in November of that year. Variety called it "nuanced but quietly excoriating," while Kenneth Turan at the LA Times called the film "explosive." Bar-Lev’s film, Long Strange Trip, about the Grateful Dead was called "one of the most engrossing rock docs ever made" by the LA Times, and was shortlisted for the Oscar.

== Director/Producer ==
According to IMDb Bar-Lev has directed or produced the following works:

- Fighter (2000) (director)
- VH1: All Access (2003) TV series (producer) (unknown episodes)
- Sundance Film Festival Dailies (2003) TV series (segment producer)
- Katrina (2006) (TV) (producer)
- It Could Happen Tomorrow (2006) TV series (producer) (unknown episodes)
- My Kid Could Paint That (2007) (director)
- Trouble the Water (2008) (co-producer)
- The Tillman Story (2010) (director)
- Happy Valley (2014) (director)
- Long Strange Trip (2017) (director) – documentary about the Grateful Dead, executive produced by Martin Scorsese
- The Last First: Winter K2 (2026) (director, executive producer)
