= Ellen Winner =

Psychologist

- Education: Radcliffe College; Harvard University
- Spouse: Howard Gardner
- Website: www.ellenwinner.com

Ellen Winner is a psychologist and a professor at Boston College. She specializes in psychology of art.

Winner graduated from the Putney School in 1965 and received a PhD in developmental psychology from Harvard University in 1978. She collaborated on Project Zero to conduct studies about the way people experience and perceive art. Winner noted how psychological explorations beginning in the realm of philosophy pertained to art.

From 1995 to 96, Winner served as president of the American Psychological Association Division 10. In 2000, Winner was awarded the Rudolf Arnheim Award for Outstanding Achievement in Psychology and the Arts.

== Works ==
- Invented Worlds: The Psychology of the Arts (1982)
- The Point of Words: Children's Understanding of Metaphor and Irony (1988)
- Gifted Children: Myths and Realities (1996)
