= The Rise and Fall of Osama bin Laden =

2021 book by Peter Bergen

- Cover
- Author: Peter Bergen
- Language: English
- Series: Bestselling Historical Nonfiction
- Subject: Osama bin Laden, al-Qaeda, terrorism, counterterrorism, Taliban, American foreign policy, the war in Afghanistan
- Genre: Biography, political history
- Publisher: Simon & Schuster
- Publication date: August 3, 2021
- Publication place: United States
- Pages: 416
- ISBN: 9781982170523

The Rise and Fall of Osama bin Laden is a 2021 biography of al-Qaeda leader Osama bin Laden by the American journalist Peter Bergen, published by Simon & Schuster. Based on files recovered in the 2011 Abbottabad raid and on interviews with bin Laden's relatives, associates, and U.S. officials, Bergen follows bin Laden from a privileged Saudi childhood to the leadership of al-Qaeda and, after the September 11 attacks, through his decade in hiding in Pakistan.

== Author ==
Bergen, a vice president at the New America think tank, a professor at Arizona State University, and a national-security analyst for CNN, had covered bin Laden for a quarter century by the time the book appeared. He produced a 1997 television interview with bin Laden, and The Rise and Fall of Osama bin Laden is his fourth book on the al-Qaeda leader, after Holy War, Inc. (2001), The Osama bin Laden I Know (2006), and Manhunt (2012).

== Summary ==
The book is divided into three parts, "Holy Warrior", "War with the U.S.", and "On the Run".

Roughly 470,000 files were recovered from bin Laden's compound and released in full in 2017, among them a 228-page notebook in which his family recorded its discussions during the final weeks of his life. Besides these files, Bergen also uses the leaked 2013 report of Pakistan's Abbottabad Commission and interviews with members of bin Laden's inner circle. These were conducted over two decades. Bergen himself produced bin Laden's first television interview in 1997 and toured the Abbottabad compound in February 2012, shortly before the Pakistani military demolished it.

In his aim to explain the gradual radicalization that turned a shy heir of one of the Middle East's richest families into the planner of the September 11 attacks, the author studies bin Laden's childhood. Bin Laden was the only child of his father's brief marriage to Allia Ghanem, a Syrian from a poor Alawite family.As Bergen explains, the boy was an outsider even within his own family: he met his father, the construction magnate Mohammed bin Laden, on only five occasions, was one of more than fifty children, (Note: Osama bin Laden was the seventeenth child out of fifty two Muhammad bin Ladin had with his 22 wives.) and had a mother the bin Laden clan never fully accepted. The bin Ladens themselves, a family of Yemeni origin, were not regarded by Saudis as truly Saudi. By the age of twenty, he was already a religious fanatic. His father suddenly died in a plane crash in 1967, a loss that pushed the ten-year-old Osama deeper into religion. His eldest brother Salem, who thereafter led the family and was one of the few people with any hold over him, died the same way in 1988. Bin Laden financed and later fought alongside the Arab volunteers in the Soviet–Afghan War, and founded al-Qaeda at meetings in Peshawar in 1988. Those volunteers mattered little to the war's outcome, Bergen writes, and no evidence has emerged in four decades for the widely repeated claim that the CIA funded bin Laden or his men.

The middle chapters follow bin Laden's turn against the United States after half a million American troops arrived in Saudi Arabia in response to Iraq's invasion of Kuwait in 1990. Bergen tracks his years of exile in Sudan, his expulsion to Afghanistan in 1996, and the declarations of war he issued in 1996 and 1998. Al-Qaeda bombed two U.S. embassies in East Africa in 1998; its attack on the destroyer USS Cole two years later went unanswered by Washington. Bergen argues that bin Laden, taking the American retreat from Lebanon after the 1983 Beirut barracks bombing as his model, expected the September 11 attacks to drive the United States out of the Middle East. He "ruled over al-Qaeda like a medieval monarch", Bergen writes, and overrode his own lieutenants when they warned against attacking America. Interleaved with this story is an account of the few American officials who pieced the threat together years before 9/11, beginning with Gina Bennett, a junior State Department analyst whose 1993 paper was the U.S. government's first warning about bin Laden, and Michael Scheuer, who from 1996 ran Alec Station, the CIA unit created to track bin Laden.

Bergen blames the Pentagon for the failure at Tora Bora in December 2001, when General Tommy Franks turned down a CIA request for 800 Rangers to block bin Laden's escape into Pakistan. He explains how the 2003 American invasion of Iraq gave a battered al-Qaeda, w new chance, a new battlefield and a new generation of recruits, "the Iraq War," he writes, "had saved al-Qaeda". Using the seized files, Bergen tried to reconstruct bin Laden's last years in Abbottabad. This includes details about bin Laden's life. He lived with his three wives and a dozen children and grandchildren, dyed his beard with Just for Men, used the on-screen channel guide to hide the faces of female news presenters, and tried to manage al-Qaeda's scattered affiliates through memos carried out by courier. His two oldest wives, each holding a doctorate, helped draft the public statement he hoped would make him relevant to the Arab Spring.

From the American side, Bergen follows the courier trail that led the CIA to the compound and concludes that coercive interrogation did not produce the breakthrough. The CIA detainees who underwent it consistently misled their questioners about the courier's identity. Bergen finds no evidence that Pakistani officials knew who was living in Abbottabad.

The author considers 9/11 both as a tactical success and a strategic failure for al-Qaeda. He compares it to Pearl Harbor: instead of pushing the United States out of the Muslim world, the attacks drew it further in. Bin Laden's ideas nonetheless outlived him, Bergen writes. The Abbottabad files show that the Taliban never intended to break with al-Qaeda, which in turn helped fund the Haqqani network, among the most violent factions within the Taliban. Al-Qaeda's Iraqi branch, for its part, later grew into the Islamic State.

== Critical reception ==
Louise Richardson in the New York Times called it one of the best of the books marking the twentieth anniversary of the September 11 attacks: few, she wrote, were "likely to be as meticulously documented, as fluidly written or as replete with riveting detail". Bergen used the Abbottabad material lightly, she found, writing "with the lucidity of an experienced journalist", and put to rest several myths, among them the supposed ties between bin Laden and Saddam Hussein. She also accepted the book's case that coercive interrogation was not what led the CIA to bin Laden, and that the best chance to capture him was squandered at Tora Bora. That Bergen simply described bin Laden's extraordinary self-belief rather than trying to explain it made the account, she wrote, "all the more fascinating".

Less well known, Bernard Haykel wrote in the Washington Post, were the resentments that shaped bin Laden: an outcast's standing in Saudi society that he tried to overcome by marrying descendants of the prophet Muhammad and by claiming leadership of a global holy war. He found Bergen "particularly perceptive about the American government's reaction to the rise of bin Laden and the jihadist phenomenon". He also thought that the author is "probably correct" that the CIA had no direct connection to bin Laden in the 1980s, while arguing that jihadism should nonetheless be seen as a product of American Cold War policies that mobilized Islam against communism. Haykel described it as "intimate and detailed" account that shows how bin Laden micromanaged al-Qaeda from hiding and leaned on his wives for advice.

A "fine, rigorous and riveting account" was the verdict of the journalist Jason Burke, in the Guardian for whom the book presented general readers "an authoritative and convincing portrait of a man whose misdeeds changed all our lives in many ways, none for the better". Much of the story was already known, he noted, but the newly released files from the raid still yielded "a wealth of fresh insights" into bin Laden's family life. Burke agreed that the September 11 attacks were a short-term disaster for al-Qaeda and that it was the invasion of Iraq that saved the movement, and he wrote that Bergen "angrily demolishes the lies that underpinned US policy under the Bush administration". His one reservation was that Bergen "could perhaps have allowed himself a few more pages" on the wider Islamist militant movement.

The author of his own account of the CIA's first post-9/11 mission into Afghanistan, Toby Harnden wrote that Bergen's "mastery of the detail gives him an unmatched authority", hence permitting "decisive pronouncements on some controversial issues" such as the notion that the CIA created bin Laden or that Pakistan knowingly harbored him. A "succinct, almost laconic, writing style", together with the book's brevity, made it, in his view, an excellent primer for general readers. If much of the material seemed familiar, "that is because Bergen himself has already chronicled bin Laden so assiduously". Reviewing the book weeks after the fall of Kabul, Harnden thought bin Laden had achieved "a measure of posthumous vindication": the American withdrawal from Afghanistan, he argued, had bolstered his status as a prophet in jihadist eyes.

The historian James Barr was less convinced that the subject needed another book. The prologue reconstructing bin Laden's final weeks from the seized family journal was "the best part of the book", he wrote, its picture of the diminished fugitive "quite pathetic" in effect, while "the rest covers well-trodden territory and will leave keen readers with a sense of déjà lu". He allowed that the book was "a highly readable canter" through what is now known, one that made clear the two critical periods in bin Laden's path before 2001. The first was the loss of his father and then, just as the Afghan war ended, of his brother Salem, whose death removed "a restraining influence" on him; the second was 1998, when the Taliban came close to handing bin Laden over to Saudi Arabia. The story of how the Americans finally tracked bin Laden down, Barr added, was told "much better" in Bergen's 2012 book Manhunt.
