= Shadi Abdalla =

Iraqi bodyguard

- Known for: An associate of Abu Musab al Zarqawi, the leader of al Qaeda in Iraq

Shadi Abdalla is a former associate of Abu Musab al-Zarqawi, the leader of al Qaeda in Iraq, and is regarded as having knowledge of some of al Qaeda's most important Afghan training camps.

Peter Bergen quoted Shadi Abdalla's description of the al Farouq training camp in his book The Osama bin Laden I Know.

According to the Kashmir Telegraph Shadi Abdalla and four other men were arrested by German security officials on April 23, 2002.

On September 24, 2003, the United States Treasury designated Shadi Abdalla and the same four other men who had been captured in Germany as "members of Zarqawi’s German-based terrorist cell Al Tawhid". The other four men asserted to be members of the German cell were: Mohamed Abu Dhess, Aschraf Al-Dagma, Ismail Shalabi and Djamel Moustfa.

Shadi Abdellah was listed by the United Nations 1267 Committee on its list of individuals whose assets should be seized. He was removed from the list on December 23, 2004, after agreeing to testify against other individuals suspected of being members of al Qaeda, pleading guilty to lesser charges, whereupon he was enrolled in Germany's witness protection program. Removal from the list was required for him to receive German assistance while in the witness protection program.

BBC News reported that Shadi Abdellah acknowledged serving as one of Osama bin Laden's bodyguards.
