= United States of Jihad =

- First edition
- Author: Peter Bergen
- Language: English
- Genre: Political
- Publisher: Crown Publishing Group
- Publication date: February 2, 2016
- Publication place: United States
- Media type: Print
- ISBN: 978-0-8041-3954-0

United States of Jihad is a 2016 book by Peter Bergen. It chronicles various case studies of jihadist terrorism within the United States. The book served as the basis for a 2016 HBO documentary, Homegrown: The Counter-Terror Dilemma.

== Summary ==
Peter Bergen's United States of Jihad provides an authoritative overview of one of the most discussed—yet misunderstood—topics: jihadist terrorism in the United States. As Bergen notes in Jihad, some 360 Americans have been charged with jihadist terrorism crimes in the US since the September 11 attacks. As a result of those attacks, public opinion has, at times, viewed terrorism as an existential threat to the US.

One of the standout points in Jihad is: of the 360 people who have been prosecuted for jihadist terrorism offenses since 9/11, an overwhelming 80% were US persons- meaning that they were either citizens or legal permanent residents of the United States at the time. This stands in stark contrast to the presumption by some that persons of the Islamic faith who originate from outside the US are the primary jihadist threat. Indeed, as Bergen shows, Americans like Anwar al-Awlaki, Adam Gadahn, Omar Hammami, and David Headley have had prominent roles in foreign terrorist organizations. Awlaki's radical sermons have been directly tied to nearly a quarter of American jihadist cases, Bergen says. Additionally, a number of American Muslims have chosen to leave, or have attempted to leave, the US in order to join a foreign terrorist organization. Others have provided financial support to these groups.

Bergen's examination of American jihadists finds that they are largely middle class and typically well educated. Some, like Major Nidal Hasan, would grow up with the quintessential American lifestyle, before experiencing a "cognitive opening" that turned them towards militant Islam. Bergen finds that in Hasan's case, it was the deaths of his parents that provided this opening, as their deaths caused him to become more pious. This in turn ultimately led to Hasan's deadly 2009 assault at Fort Hood, Texas.

On another front, Bergen shows how the greatest menace to the US homeland is posed, not by centralized groups like Al-Qaeda and ISIS, but rather by lone wolf attackers, such as the Tsarnaev brothers, whose terrorist attacks in 2013 paralyzed Boston's residents with fear. These jihadists visit terrorist websites and learn how to carry out attacks in the US. As social media and encrypted chat applications continue to grow, recruiters take full advantage of their anonymity and continue to seek out more recruits for further attacks. Their decentralized operations are difficult, if not impossible, for the authorities to stop, and the terrorist organizations are aware of this. Despite the massive surveillance efforts on the part of the intelligence community, Bergen finds that in the cases of the 360 individuals he examined for Jihad, "surveillance of American phone data had no discernible role in preventing acts of terrorism and only a marginal role in preventing terrorist-related activity, such as fund-raising."

== Reception ==
United States of Jihad has been well-received, with former Secretary of Homeland Security Janet Napolitano declaring that "Bergen's book is the best one-volume treatment available on the current state of jihad in America." Michiko Kakutani writes that Bergen's "profiles of jihadists . . . leave the reader with a harrowing appreciation of the banality of evil and an unnerving sense of missteps made by the authorities" and "Mr. Bergen's detailed accounts of terror plots (both executed, foiled or failed) make for chilling reading."

Walter Mead states Bergen has written "what in effect are two books about terrorism. One is a riveting thoroughly-researched account of the evolving state of the threat as a growing number of American citizens join the ranks of foreign terrorist movements . . . The other is a skilled defense of the Obama administration's anti-terror effort." Zach Dorfman, of the Los Angeles Times, believes that "Bergen takes a generally skeptical view of the growth of the post-9/11 national security state and of the fear-mongering about Islam that has increasingly transfixed the darker crannies of American politics."

Al Jazeera's Jenifer Fenton found that Jihad offers "sobering reading in a feverish U.S. political climate." Other reviewers, like Mary Louise Kelly with The Washington Post, have stated that they would like to see more discussion, namely because "the prescriptive sections are among the weakest of the book" and Bergen's discussion of the FBI's Behavioral Analysis Unit was "long and not particularly compelling."

Writing for The Boston Globe, Rayyan Al-Shawaf calls Bergen's work, "engrossing and edifying." Al-Shawaf also credits Bergen for not overstating the threat posed by jihadist terrorism while simultaneously "recognizing the potential of secular Muslims . . . [who] are particularly well-positioned to allay ordinary Americans' sometimes indiscriminate suspicion of Islam's adherents, as well as provide their (numerically few) alienated coreligionists with a model [for rejecting radicalization]." Jason Burke at Literary Review believes that Bergen's work "is a rigorous, balanced, clear-eyed and perceptive overview of violent Islamic extremism in the USA."
