= Nada Bakos =

Former Central Intelligence Agency analyst

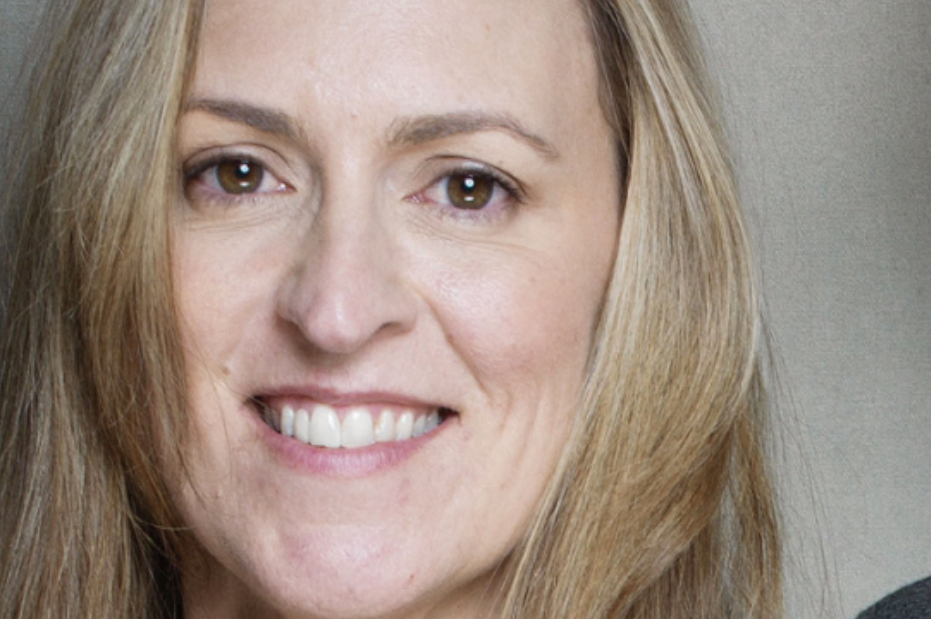
- Born: 1969 (age 56–57); Denton, Montana, USA
- Education: University of Utah (BS)
- Occupations: intelligence analyst targeting officer consultant writer

Nada Glass Bakos (born 1969) is an American author and former Central Intelligence Agency (CIA) analyst and targeting officer. She was involved in a number of notable counterterrorism operations during her career. She was part of a group of CIA analysts studying Al Qaeda and its leader, as portrayed in the 2013 HBO documentary, Manhunt: The Search for Bin Laden. She also served as the Chief Targeting Officer in the search for Abu Musab al-Zarqawi, the leader of Al Qaeda in Iraq and predecessor of ISIS. After 10 years, she left the CIA.

== Early years ==
She graduated from high school with a class of nine students. She attended Montana State University from 1987 through 1991 and transferred to the University of Utah to finish her B.S. in international economics.

== Career ==
=== CIA ===
In 2000, at the age of 30, Bakos joined the CIA as an analyst in the Counterterrorism Center. At this point, she met Gina Bennett, who had been analyzing al Qaeda for 20 years and was tracking bin Laden. Bakos' role at this time is portrayed in the PBS Frontline episode, The Secret History of ISIS, as well as the Emmy Award-winning HBO documentary, Manhunt: The Search for Bin Laden.She was part of the team of CIA analysts studying the relationship between Iraq, al Qaeda, bin Laden, and the 9/11 terrorist attacks. This documentary shows the work that went into the raid that ultimately killed bin Laden, highlighting the work of analysts and case officers during that time.

During the Iraq War, Bakos served as a Chief Targeting Officer in the CIA's National Clandestine Service searching for Abu Musab al-Zarqawi, the founder of Al Qaeda in Iraq and predecessor of ISIS. Zarqawi was killed in a targeted drone strike on June 7, 2006, by the US military. It is the role that inspired Bakos' book, The Targeter: My Life in the CIA, Hunting Terrorists and Challenging the White House. She chronicles her time as part of the CIA's analytic team studying Iraq before and during the Iraq invasion. The Targeter describes conflicts with the White House when their analysis faces push back, Iraq war zones, the inner workings of the CIA, the world of the intelligence community following the 9/11 terrorist attacks, working with US Special Operations Forces while tracking Zarqawi and other terrorists, and Bakos' personal view of female government leadership as well as what problems women face in male dominated career fields.

=== Post-CIA career ===
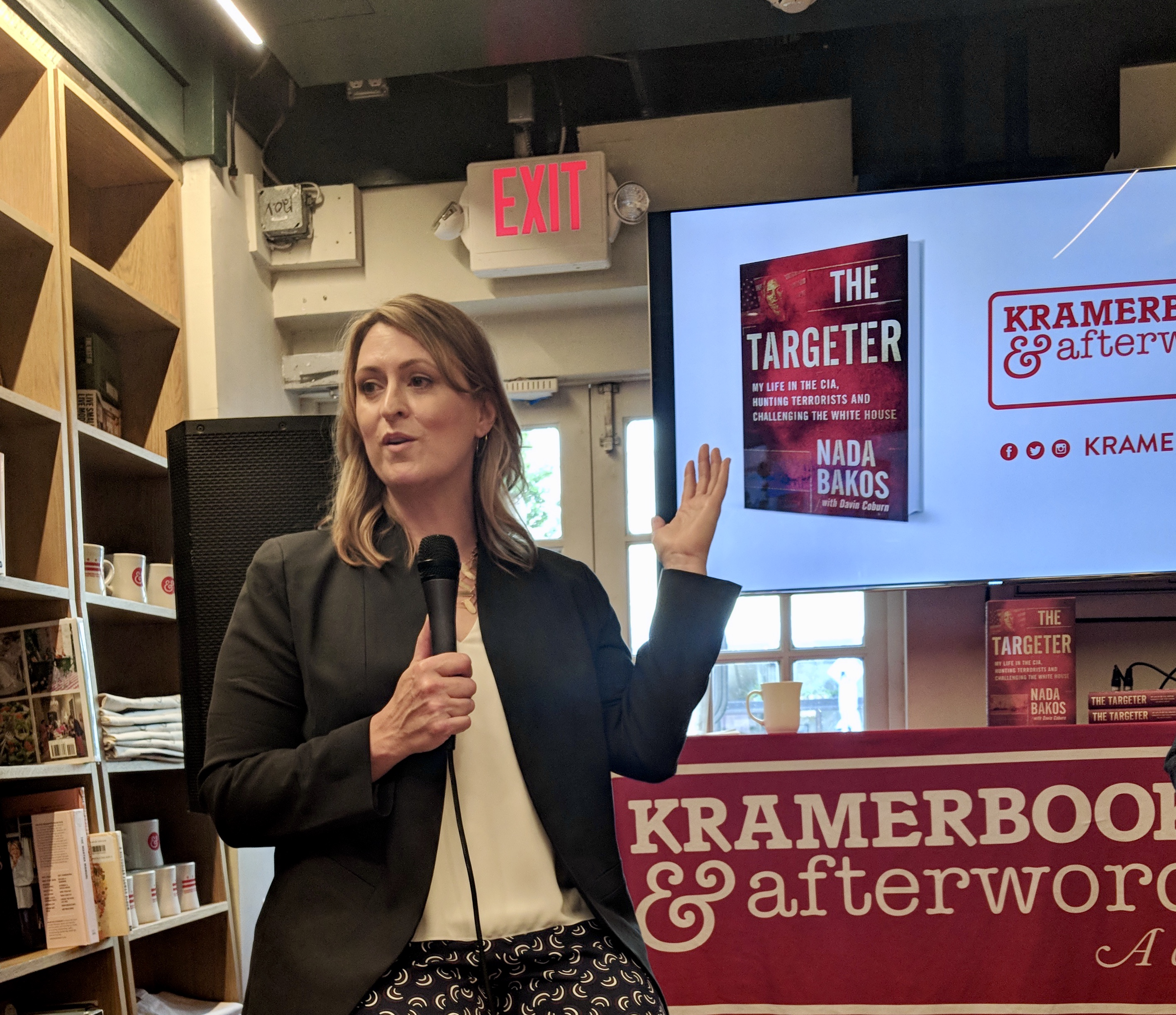
The Targeter book publishing talk

After 10 years at the agency, Bakos made the decision to leave. Since then, Bakos has worked with Starbucks and for a number of other organizations in a consultant role. She assists executives and government officials in understanding the global context surrounding new technologies. Many of her consultant roles have involved national security issues and regional stability. In addition, she has been a commentator and resource for CNN, ABC, FOX, MSNBC, BBC, CBC, the New York Times, Wall Street Journal, Washington Post, and a number of other international and national media organizations. She is also a senior fellow in the Program on National Security at the Foreign Policy Research Institute.

In April 2018, Bakos filed a lawsuit against the CIA as they were delaying the release of her book, The Targeter, for two years. In the lawsuit, she argues that the CIA is infringing on her First Amendment right to publish unclassified information. CIA employees are required to submit their work for approval by the agency for the rest of their lives, however, by law, there is supposed to be a response provided within 30 days of submission.

In October 2020, Bakos signed a letter stating the Biden laptop story “has the classic earmarks of a Russian information operation It was in fact revealed the laptop contained no evidence of Russian disinformation, and portions of its contents have been verified as authentic. On January 20, 2025, Nada lost all of her federal security clearances through an executive action issued by President Donald Trump.

== Published works ==
- The Targeter: My Life in the CIA, Hunting Terrorists and Challenging the White House. Little Brown and Company. 2019. ISBN 0316260479.

== Awards ==
- 2018 Templeton Fellow at the Foreign Policy Research Institute

== In popular culture ==
- Instinct, TV series (2018–present) – Bakos was a technical consultant
- PBS Frontline: The Secret History of ISIS (Season 34, Episode 10) – Bakos portrays herself
- Manhunt: The Search for Bin Laden (2013) – Bakos portrays herself
