= The Longest War: The Enduring Conflict between America and Al-Qaeda =

2011 book by Peter Bergen

- First edition
- Author: Peter Bergen
- Language: English
- Genre: Political
- Publisher: Free Press
- Publication date: June 28, 2011
- Publication place: United States
- Media type: Print
- ISBN: 978-0-7432-7893-5

The Longest War: The Enduring Conflict Between America and Al Qaeda is a book written by CNN's Peter Bergen. It was published in 2011 and became a New York Times bestseller.

== General Overview ==
Bergen’s book covers the events which led up to the September 11 attacks and continues on, concluding with an account of the raid which killed Osama bin Laden. While Bergen’s past works focused more on bin Laden and the rise of Al-Qaeda, The Longest War sheds new light on American actions in the war on terror.

From the outset, Bergen builds a strong case against the incompetence of the George W. Bush administration during the early years of the war, from the failure to capture or kill bin Laden at Tora Bora, to the bungled early days of the Iraq War and the CIA's controversial use of enhanced interrogation techniques that often yielded little beyond what had been gathered using standard approaches. However, Bergen notes that by the end of President Bush’s second term in office, Al-Qaeda’s own strategic failings were causing it to lose Muslim hearts and minds in the Middle East. Indeed, as Bergen puts it, Al-Qaeda’s continued destruction of Muslim lives in the name of jihad, coupled with its inability to morph into a broader movement with any real vision of governance, is its own undoing.

== Reception ==
Michiko Kakutani of The New York Times writes that The Longest War is an "essential book" which provides a "succinct and compelling overview" of the war on terror.

Thomas E. Ricks, also writing for The New York Times, declares that Bergen "covers it all," from Al-Qaeda’s lethal aspirations and the Bush administration’s ineptitude, to the "continued unhelpful role of Pakistan" in the fight against jihadist terrorism. Ricks notes that Bergen deftly explores the "miscalculations and misunderstandings of both sides in 2001," from bin Laden’s underestimation of the United States’ strength and resolve, to President Bush’s misguided attempt to characterize bin Laden’s motivation as a war "on our freedoms." Ricks adds, "For years, I tried to read every new novel about how 9/11 affected our lives. None of the novels were as effective or moving as The Longest War, which is a history of our time."

Jason Burke writes in The Guardian that "few rival Bergen’s . . . ability to explain, patiently and intelligibly, the complicated concepts" relating to Al-Qaeda, and Islamic militancy in general. Burke calls The Longest War’s discussion of the inner workings of al-Qaeda "revelatory," noting that some members of al-Qaeda actually opposed carrying out the 9/11 attacks because they had the sense that the U.S.’s likely response would shut down their safe haven in Afghanistan.
