= Daniel Rothenberg =

American social scientist

- Citizenship: United States of America
- Education: Brown University, University of Chicago
- Scientific career
- Institutions: University of California, Irvine, University of Michigan, Yale Law School, DePaul University, Arizona State University

Daniel Rothenberg is a Professor of Practice at the School of Politics and Global Studies and co-director with Peter Bergen of the Center on the Future of War at Arizona State University. He is also a senior fellow at New America.

Rothenberg studies terrorism, human rights and transitional justice and has worked with human rights projects in Afghanistan, Iraq, Central Africa and Latin America. He has helped to collect and analyze first-person narratives from thousands of people affected by war and violence, including torture and rape. Rothenberg examines the lived experience of moral injury, using this as a framework for addressing the ethical and emotional impacts of intense and systematic political violence on both individuals and society.

Rothenberg was instrumental in developing The Chicago principles on post-conflict justice (2007). He has also published With these hands : the hidden world of migrant farmworkers today (1998), Testimonies : Iraq History Project (2007), Memory of silence : the Guatemalan Truth Commission Report (2012) and Drone wars : transforming conflict, law, and policy (2014).

== Early life and education ==
Rothenberg earned his B.A. at Brown University and studied sociocultural anthropology at the University of Chicago for his Ph.D. His dissertation, The Panic of the Robaniños: Gringo Organ Stealers, Narratives of Mistrust, and the Guatemalan Political Imagination, addresses the ways in which uncertainties and anxieties in Guatemala in the 1990s coalesced around unsubstantiated narratives of child abduction and organ-stealing.

== Career ==
Rothenberg worked with farm workers as a federally funded outreach worker and paralegal. He collected over 250 interviews with people throughout the United States and Mexico, forming the basis for his book, With these hands : the hidden world of migrant farmworkers today (1998).

Rothenberg was a visiting professor in the Criminology, Law and Society Program at the University of California, Irvine in 1998-1999, and a professor in Anthropology at the University of Michigan from 1999-2002. He was a Senior Fellow at the Orville H. Schell, Jr. Center for International Human Rights at Yale Law School from 2002-2003.

Rothenberg held multiple positions including Director of the Jeanne and Joseph Sullivan Program for Human Rights in the Americas and Managing Director of International Projects at the International Human Rights Law Institute (IHRLI) at DePaul University College of Law between 2003 and 2010. While at DePaul, Rothenberg has been involved in projects focusing on human rights and the rule of law in areas such as Latin America, Afghanistan and Iraq. He directed the Current Violations in Iraq Project, in which Iraqi interviewers and analysts collected testimony relating to human rights violations in Iraq. These became the basis of the book Testimonies (2007).

In 2010 Rothenberg became the founding executive director of the Center for Law and Global Affairs in the Sandra Day O’Connor College of Law at Arizona State University.

== Research ==
External videos
- What are the Laws of War?, Daniel Rothenberg, April 7, 2021
- “What Is Post-Conflict Justice?”, Daniel Rothenberg, 2009
- “Human Trafficking”, Interview with Daniel Rothenberg, March 31, 2011

Rothenberg has designed and managed rule of law and human rights projects in Afghanistan, Iraq, Central Africa and throughout Latin America. In Iraq, this involved training local interviewers and human rights workers. Rothenberg's work addresses issues of gender, including the use of rape as a weapon of war and human trafficking. From his own experiences as an interviewer, dealing with extremely graphic and distressing testimony including murder, torture and rape, Rothenberg has developed personal guidelines for interviewing:

'Start with an open question: Tell me about your experience. Look them in the eye. Don't look at your notepad. If they say, "No, I don't want to talk," then leave. If they say, "Yes," and tell you horrible things, wipe the emotion from your face. Get over being surprised they would tell a stranger, you, such intimate violations. Know they are telling you because they need to tell someone, for whatever reason. And bearing that in mind, make no promises... Tell them that you can only listen, and do only that.' Daniel Rothenberg, 2011.

Rothenberg sees the documentation and analysis of human rights violations through projects, like the Current Violations in Iraq Project, as an essential step toward transitional justice and the addressing of human rights abuses. The International Human Rights Law Institute is a non-governmental organization (NGO). It plays an important role in documenting humanitarian crises, but it is not a formal truth commission and does not have the authority to enact policy reforms or reconciliation.

Rothenberg is concerned with the lived experience of moral injury, using this as a framework for addressing the ethical and emotional impacts of intense and systematic political violence on both individuals and society. He seeks to identify human rights indicators, measurable rubrics for the analysis and comparison of conditions in different countries. Such indicators could also be used to measure changes over time and the impact of interventions.

== Awards and honors ==
- 1999-2001, Michigan Society of Fellows

== Books ==
- Bergen, Peter L.; Rothenberg, Daniel, eds. (2014). Drone wars : transforming conflict, law, and policy. Cambridge University Press. ISBN 978-1-107-66338-1.
- Rothenberg, Daniel, ed. (2012). Memory of silence : the Guatemalan Truth Commission Report (1st ed.). New York: Palgrave Macmillan. ISBN 9780230340244.
- Bassiouni, M. Cherif; Rothenberg, Daniel; Hanna, Michael; Higonnet, Etelle, eds. (2007). The Chicago principles on post-conflict justice. Chicago, Illinois: International Human Rights Law Institute. ISBN 9781889001159.
- Rothenberg, Daniel, ed. (2007). Testimonies : Iraq History Project (PDF). Chicago, Illinois: International Human Rights Law Institute, DePaul University. College of Law. ISBN 978-1-889001-16-6.
- Rothenberg, Daniel (1998). With these hands : the hidden world of migrant farmworkers today. New York: Harcourt Brace & Co. ISBN 9780151002054.
