= Trump and His Generals =

Book by Peter Bergen

Trump and His Generals: The Cost of Chaos
- Author: Peter Bergen
- Language: English
- Genre: Political
- Publisher: Penguin Press
- Publication date: December 10, 2019
- Publication place: United States
- Media type: Print
- Pages: 386
- ISBN: 978-0525522416

Trump and His Generals: The Cost of Chaos is a book written by CNN's Peter Bergen. It was published in 2019 by Penguin Press in New York. The book offers an insider's perspective of President Donald Trump's approach to foreign policy during the first three years of his presidency.

== Reception ==
Derek Chollet, writing for The Washington Post, declared that Trump and His Generals is "a deeply informed study, written with clarity and flair ... [which] is the best single account of Trump's foreign policy to date."

Eliot A. Cohen, reviewing the book in The New York Times, stated that Trump and His Generals contains "the spectacular flameouts, ... the kooky theories of 'The Fourth Turning'" and raises "some important questions about the outlandish and sordid tale" of the Trump presidency.

Aram Bakshian in The Washington Times offered an alternate take on Bergen's work, opining that Trump and His Generals "purports to show how The Donald is a dangerous, addle-brained commander in chief ... [b]ut great chunks of it reveal ... what is wrong ... with the entrenched Washington establishment that has tried to thwart [Trump's] presidency at every turn."

Jeff Goodell in Rolling Stone avers that "Bergen’s book reads like an all-too prescient guidebook of how Trump would take America to war in the Middle East."

Historian Max Boot wrote in Foreign Affairs that the book is "a fair and comprehensive overview of Trump's foreign policy."
