= Manhunt: The Search for Bin Laden =

- Promotional poster for Manhunt: The Search for Bin Laden
- Directed by: Greg Barker
- Based on: Manhunt: The Ten-Year Search for Bin Laden From 9/11 to Abbottabad by Peter Bergen
- Produced by: John Battsek; Julie Goldman; Greg Barker
- Cinematography: Frank-Peter Lehmann, Erich Roland
- Edited by: Joe Bini
- Music by: Philip Sheppard
- Production company: HBO Documentary Films
- Distributed by: HBO
- Release dates: January 20, 2013 (Sundance); May 1, 2013
- Running time: 100 minutes
- Country: United States
- Language: English

Manhunt: The Search for Bin Laden is a 2013 documentary film directed by Greg Barker that explores the Central Intelligence Agency's investigation of Osama bin Laden, starting from 1995 until his death in 2011. It premiered on HBO on May 1, 2013, two years after the mission that killed bin Laden. The documentary features narratives by many of the CIA analysts and operatives who worked over a decade to understand and track bin Laden, and includes archival film footage from across Washington, D.C., Pakistan, Saudi Arabia and elsewhere in the Middle East. It also features extensive and rarely seen footage of Al-Qaeda training and propaganda videos, including video suicide notes from various terrorists who later worked as suicide bombers.

On release, the documentary was noted as a "less Hollywood-ized version" of the film Zero Dark Thirty (2012) and appreciated for showcasing "the nitty-gritty" of the decade-long search for bin Laden and the CIA analysts' jobs. It won the Primetime Emmy Award for Outstanding Documentary or Nonfiction Special in 2013. It was acknowledged for putting "a human face on the secret world of intelligence gathering."

== Synopsis ==
The Sisterhood

The first section of the documentary interviews a crew of female CIA analysts, known as the Band of Sisters, about their involvement in tracking down Osama bin Laden. They include Susan Hasler, Cindy Storer, Nada Bakos, Gina Bennett, a 25-year veteran of the agency, and Barbara Sude, a senior Al-Qaeda analyst. It also features John E. McLaughlin who oversaw the CIA analysts and worked for staff training. The documentary mentions that the CIA started the Bin Laden Issue Station in 1995 with the code name "Alec Station."

Downrange

This section of the documentary interviews Peter Bergen who has been reporting in Afghanistan for over 30 years and briefly mentions the insignificance of bin Laden in 1984.

An Analytic Judgement

Cindy Storer discusses the analysis work and conclusions built around the early intelligence related to the Jihad movement and mentions that she wrote the CIA's first warning to the President of the United States about bin Laden.

A Declaration of War

This section of the documentary covers interviews with bin Laden by Peter Bergen and Peter Arnett, after bin Laden had declared a war against United States, and includes clips of the interviews. Storer and McLaughlin mention that though the CIA paid enough attention to bin Laden's attack warnings, it failed to determine the date and timing of planned attacks. Storer notes that it was a "difficult" task because al-Qaeda was a "clandestine organization."

The Blame

Storer discusses the criticism and accusations of negligence made against the CIA by the United States Congress. The documentary also mentions an internal CIA investigation that cast blame on some of the original members of "Alec Station" for their failure to inform the FBI, which was also investigating al-Qaeda. Later, former FBI agent Ali Soufan narrates his experience of interrogating bin Laden's bodyguard.

Dismantlement

McLaughlin mentions the "World Wide Attack Matrix," a war declared by the U.S. against al-Qaeda. Philip Mudd, then deputy of the CIA's counter-terrorism center, notes the CIA's task was to understand al-Qaeda and then to "dismantle" it. He also discusses changes in "Alec Station" following the 9/11 attacks. Jose Rodriguez, who ran the CIA's counter-terrorism center, and Marty Martin, who ran spies in the Middle East and who led the CIA's war on al-Qaeda, discuss their involvement in the project. Martin describes how the CIA became "more aggressive" with its changed "rule-book." Rodriguez identifies the CIA's focus on capturing Abu Zubaydah and White House approval for "enhanced interrogations" involving twelve "defined" techniques.

Kill/Capture

One of the CIA officers indicates that some of the original members of "Alec Station" were moved to become "targeters" for bin Laden and were sent to war zones with elite military units. The documentary then interviews Stanley A. McChrystal who commanded U.S. Special Operations units and Michael Mullen who was the Chairman of the Joint Chiefs of Staff about their roles in the project.

The Breakthrough

Noting Abu Musab al-Zarqawi's interaction with bin Laden and the terrorist leader's association with Hassan Ghul, CIA agents then cite the importance of Abu Ahmed Al-Kuwaiti, a pseudonym for bin Laden's courier and his only point of contact to the outside world.

End Game

Michael Hayden, who became director of the CIA in 2006, notes his involvement in tracing bin Laden's courier and the person behind the pseudonym, Ibrahim Saeed. Joby Warrick, who covered the CIA for The Washington Post, mentions Humam al-Balawi, who was a doctor who treated the number-two leader of al-Qaeda, Ayman al-Zawahiri and his videotapes from meetings with Zawahiri. Al-Balawi was later shown in his final videotape before killing himself in a suicide bombing at a CIA post in Afghanistan, killing several CIA officers, including Jennifer Matthews.

The documentary ends with the video footage of bin Laden before his capture and Stanley A. McChrystal's question to the American people, "why is the enemy the enemy?"

== Production ==
The director of the film, Greg Barker, noted that it was difficult to track down individuals who worked for the CIA but did not have any risk of exposure. He also mentioned that the CIA did not have any approval over the content of the film. Interviewees had to make sure that they did not reveal any classified information.

== Credits ==
"The Sisterhood" analysts
- Susan Hasler
- Cynthia Storer
- Nada Bakos
- Gina Bennett
- Barbara Sude

- John E. McLaughlin
- Marty Martin
- Peter Bergen
- Peter Arnett
- Ali Soufan
- Jose Rodriguez
- Stanley A. McChrystal
- Michael Mullen
- Michael Hayden
- Joby Warrick

== Reception ==
The documentary received generally positive feedback on release for "being well researched." Mother Jones noted that the documentary has "the pulse of a Michael Mann thriller." The New York Times lauded the film for its emphasis on the perspectives of the female CIA analysts working on the mission, and noted that it is "dense with information" and "occasionally a bit repetitive." The Wall Street Journal stated that the narratives of various CIA officers and operatives made the documentary "fascinating," noting that the film describes "the passion, the anger, the regrets and the fearful determination" of the CIA officers, who work in "the loneliest profession on earth." TV Guide described the documentary as a "less Hollywood-ized version" of the film Zero Dark Thirty (2012), and noted that the documentary "goes beyond the actual raid," exploring the CIA's culture of intelligence gathering and featuring various analysts and operatives.

The documentary was often compared with the film Zero Dark Thirty (2012) and the television film Seal Team Six: The Raid on Osama Bin Laden (2012). It was also said to have failed to give justification of claims made by various CIA agents, and was criticized for being "unclear" and a "frustrating viewing experience."

The documentary was selected for the 2013 Sundance Film Festival and was part of U.S. Documentary Competition. Three CIA analysts featured in the documentary—Marty Martin, Nada Bakos, and Cindy Storer—also attended the discussion about the documentary after its premier in the festival.

It won the Primetime Emmy Award for Outstanding Documentary or Nonfiction Special in 2013.
