= Gina Bennett =

American intelligence analyst

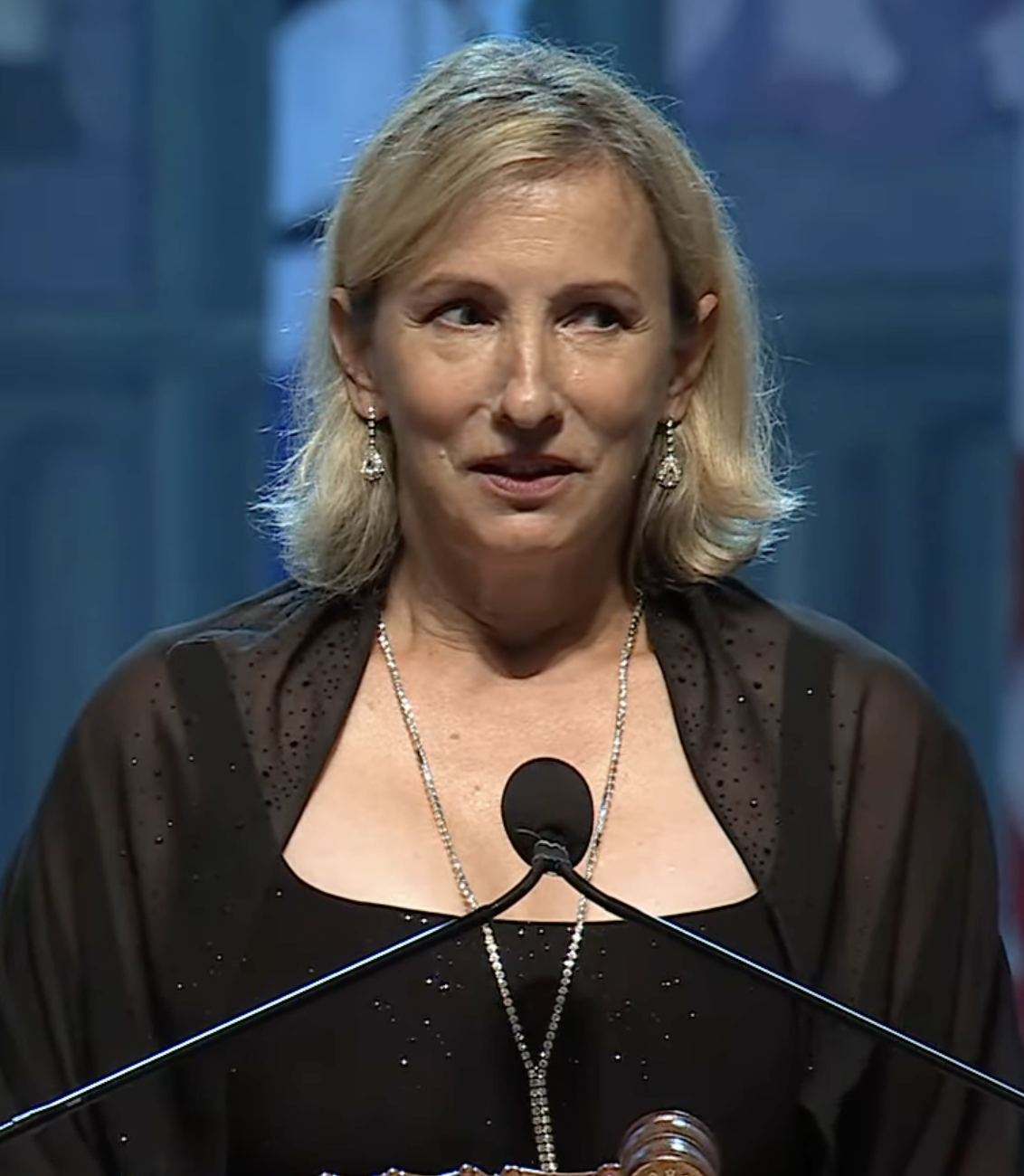
- Bennett speaking at DAR Constitution Hall in 2025
- Education: University of Virginia (BA); Marine Corps War College (MA)
- Occupations: intelligence analyst writer
- Years active: 1988–2022
- Children: 5
- Awards: DAR Patriot Award

Gina M. Bennett is an American writer and retired intelligence analyst. She worked as a Central Intelligence Agency terrorism senior targeting analyst and as the senior advisor for the Directorate of Strategic Operational Planning at the National Counterterrorism Center. She is known for being one of the first intelligence services personnel to identify Osama bin Laden as a threat to United States national security, which is covered in the documentaries Manhunt: The Search for Bin Laden, The Spymasters, and Makers: Women Who Make America. Bennett is an adjunct professor in security studies at Georgetown University. She authored four books, National Security Mom: Why "Going Soft" Will Make America Strong in 2008, How Kids Can Be Good Citizens: Lessons for Keeping America Strong & Safe in 2013, America Needs a Time-Out: National Security Mom 2 in 2019, and If Two of Them Are Dead in 2025.

== Early life and education ==
Bennett is the youngest of five children of a United States Navy veteran who served during the Korean War. She has ancestors who fought during the American Revolutionary War. Bennett grew up in Virginia Beach, Virginia and at Joint Expeditionary Base–Little Creek.

She graduated from the University of Virginia with a bachelor's degree in economics and foreign affairs, with a minor in religious studies, and earned a master's degree in security studies from the Marine Corps War College.

== Career ==
Bennett worked in the intelligence and national security field for thirty four years. She began her career in 1988 as a GS-4 clerk typist with the United States Department of State. She was later promoted as a terrorism watch officer within the department's Bureau of Intelligence and Research.

=== CIA ===
As a counterterrorism specialist, Bennett was a member of the Central Intelligence Agency's Senior Analytic Service that authored the earliest warnings about the growing threat of Osama bin Laden in the 1990s. She was part of a group of women CIA analysts known as the "Band of Sisters", which also included Nada Bakos, Susan Hasler, Cindy Storer, and Barbara Sude.

Bennett began her career as a terrorism watch officer and, following a violent attack in Algeria in 1991, she compiled classified reports on a figure known as "Abu Abdullah" ("أبو عبد الله"), later identified as Osama bin Laden, who had financed the Afghan Arab terrorists responsible for the attack in Algeria. In 1993, she witnessed the unfolding of the World Trade Center bombing by Ramzi Yousef. In August 1993, she authored a report naming identifying Osama bin Laden as a growing threat to the United States that needed monitoring, marking the first time a United States government official had singled bin Laden out as a potential threat to national security. Bennett tracked bin Laden's influence and movements, writing about his activities and, by 2001, working with the CIA as an analyst underscoring al-Qaeda's role in global terrorism.

Following the September 11 attacks on the World Trade Center on September 11, 2001, Bennett worked to identify the next potential targets to prevent further terrorist attacks. She and her team refused to evacuate CIA Headquarters, which was considered as a potential target. A week later, she was recruited to investigate whether Saddam Hussein was involved in the attacks.

In March 2018, she was appointed as the senior advisor for the Directorate of Strategic Operational Planning at the National Counterterrorism Center.

She was featured in the Showtime documentary The Spymasters the HBO documentary Manhunt: The Search for Bin Laden, and the PBS documentary Makers: Women Who Make America.

=== Post-CIA ===
After retiring from the intelligence services in 2022, Bennett began working as the strategic advisor for Girl Security, a nonpartisan nonprofit organization focused on empowering and advancing young women into national and international security missions. She also serves as an adjunct professor with the Walsh School of Foreign Service's Center for Security Studies at Georgetown University and an adjunct professor at George Washington University. She teaches ethics in intelligence support to national security and hunter-gatherer national security.

She served on the board of directors of the Alturas Institute, a nonprofit organization focused on advancing American democracy, promoting the United States Constitution and gender equality. Bennett authored four books, National Security Mom: Why "Going Soft" Will Make America Strong in 2008, How Kids Can Be Good Citizens: Lessons for Keeping America Strong & Safe in 2013, America Needs a Time-Out: National Security Mom 2 in 2019, and If Two of Them Are Dead in 2025.

On June 28, 2025, Bennett was the keynote speaker during the National Defense Night ceremony of the Daughters of the American Revolution's 134th Continental Congress at DAR Constitution Hall in Washington, D.C. She was presented the DAR Patriot Award by President General Pamela Rouse Wright.

== Personal life ==
Bennett is divorced and has five children. She lives in Virginia Beach.
