= Peter Bergen =

American journalist (born 1962)

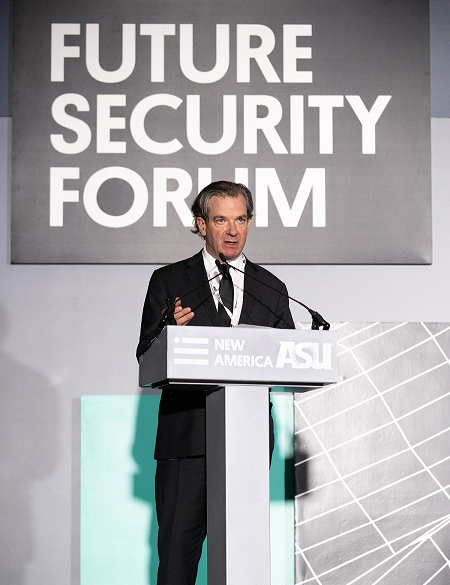
- Bergen at Future Security Conference 2019.
- Born: Peter Lampert Bergen; Minneapolis, Minnesota, U.S.
- Occupations: Author, podcaster, producer, educator
- Spouse: Tresha Mabile
- Children: 2
- Website: PeterBergen.com

Peter Lampert Bergen is an American journalist, documentary producer, think tank executive, professor, and author, best known for his work on foreign policy, national security and counterterrorism.

He has written or edited eleven books—three of which were New York Times bestsellers, and four were named among the best non-fiction books of the year by the Washington Post. The books have been translated into 25 languages.

He has served as a producer of multiple Emmy-nominated documentaries. Bergen is CNN's national security analyst, a vice president at the think tank New America, and a professor of practice at Arizona State University.

Bergen produced the first televised interview with Osama bin Laden in 1997, in which bin Laden declared war against the United States to a Western audience.

== Background ==
Peter Lampert Bergen was born in Minneapolis and grew up in London, England, the son of Donald Thomas Bergen and Sarah Elizabeth (née Lampert) Bergen. Her grandfather, Leonard Lampert, founded the Lampert Lumber Company. Peter Bergen was raised in his family's Roman Catholic faith. He attended Ampleforth College in North Yorkshire before receiving an open scholarship to New College, Oxford, in 1981, where he graduated with a degree in modern history in 1984. He is in the PhD program in the History & Politics department at the University of Portsmouth (UK).

== Career ==
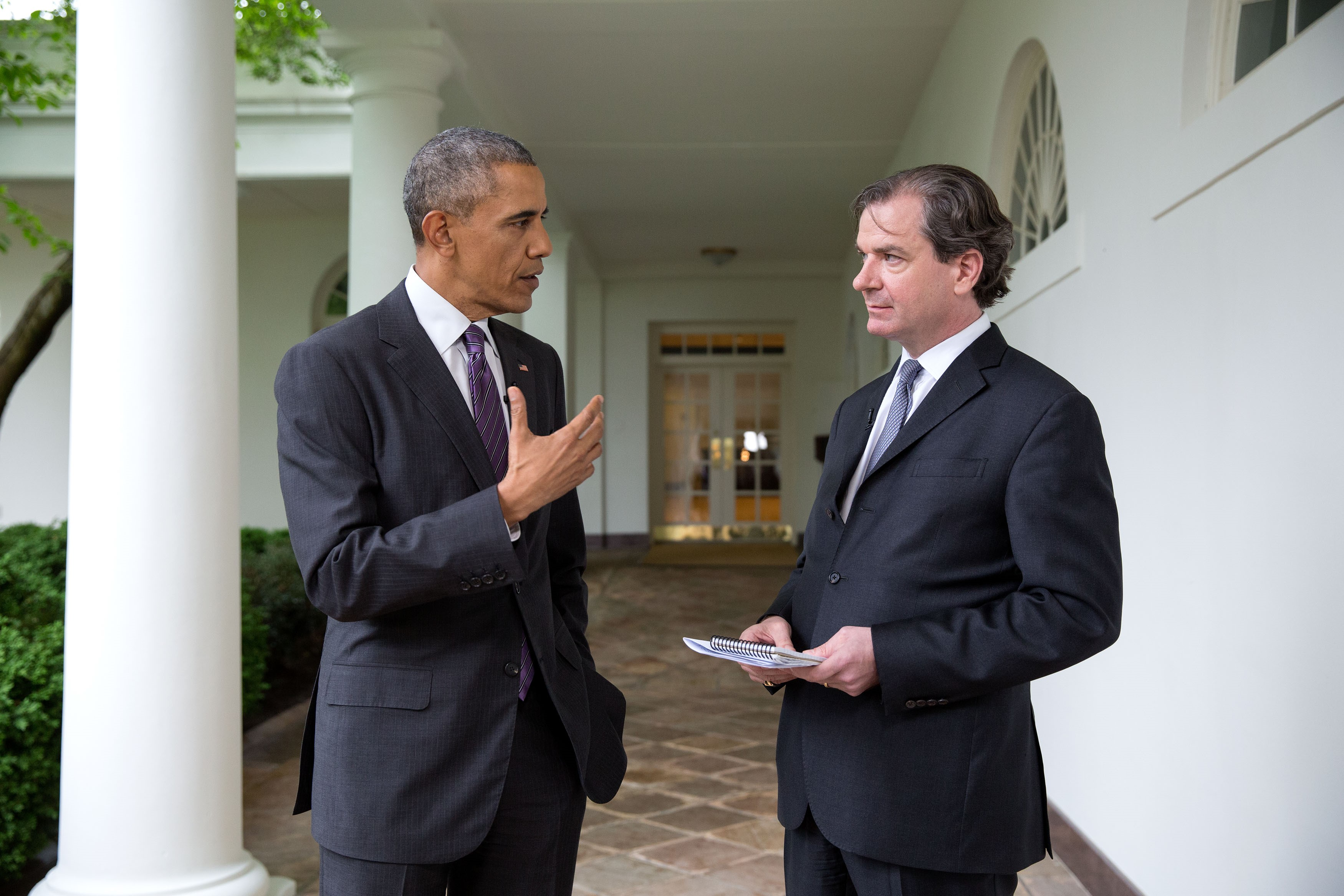
President Barack Obama and CNN's Peter Bergen discuss the Osama bin Laden raid

Bergen is vice president for global studies and fellows at New America, a non-partisan think tank in Washington, D.C. Bergen is part of the management group of New America: $40 million annual budget, 150 plus staff and paid fellows. Bergen oversees the global security work of New America, which focuses in particular on armed drones, proxy warfare, terrorism, and the future of warfare. He also oversees its fellows program, which has incubated the work of multiple Pulitzer Prize winners and finalists. He is a CNN national security analyst.

As of 2026, he is a Professor of Practice at the School of Politics and Global Studies at Arizona State University, where he is the co-director of the Future Security Initiative, and also the director of the Center on Intelligence and National Security. The Future Security Initiative (FSI) consists of 70 faculty, fellows, and staff. In 2026, FSI had 230 current students in its MA in Global Security and around 600 graduates.

As of 2026, Bergen is the chairman of the board of the Global Special Operations Foundation, a non-profit advocating for the interests of special operations forces, which together with US Special Operations Command, organizes the annual SOF Week conference in Tampa attended by some 25,000 members of the global special operations community. He is on the Advisory Council of the James W. Foley Legacy Foundation, which advocates for Americans held hostage or "wrongfully detained" by states. He is a member of the Corporation of the Perkins School in Watertown, MA, which educates deaf/blind children and young adults. According to The Washington Post in 2026, "A CNN journalist spent years reporting on al-Qaeda. Now he’s handing over a massive archive. On the 25th anniversary of 9/11, Peter Bergen donated more than 150,000 pages of documents to Georgetown University."

As of 2026, Bergen is on the editorial board of Studies in Conflict & Terrorism, the leading scholarly journal in the field, and has testified 18 times before US congressional committees about national security issues, including the U.S. House of Representatives Homeland Security Committee and the U.S. Senate Foreign Relations Committee.

He has held teaching positions at Harvard Kennedy School at Harvard University and the Paul H. Nitze School of Advanced International Studies at Johns Hopkins University. He was a research fellow at Fordham University's Center on National Security from 2012 to 2025 and a fellow at New York University's Center on Law & Security between 2003 and 2011. He hosted the Audible podcast In the Room with Peter Bergen from 2023 to 2025. He was a contributing editor at The New Republic for many years, and editor of the South Asia Channel and South Asia Daily, online publications of Foreign Policy magazine from 2009 to 2016. He was the founding editor of the Coronavirus Daily Brief which operated during the pandemic. He was also a member of the Homeland Security Experts Group.

== Books ==
External videos
- Washington Journal interview with Bergen on Holy War, Inc., November 12, 2001, C-SPAN
- Discussion with Bergen on Holy War, Inc., December 12, 2001, C-SPAN
- Booknotes interview with Bergen on Holy War, Inc., December 16, 2001, C-SPAN
- Presentation by Bergen on Holy War, Inc., April 16, 2005, C-SPAN
- Presentation by Bergen on The Osama bin Laden I Know, January 15, 2006, C-SPAN
- Presentation by Bergen on The Osama bin Laden I Know, May 6, 2006, C-SPAN
- After Words interview with Bergen on The Longest War, January 29, 2011, C-SPAN
- Panel discussion on Talibanistan, January 7, 2013, C-SPAN
- Discussion with Bergen and director Greg Barker on Manhunt and the documentary film based on the book, July 18, 2013, C-SPAN
- Washington Journal interview with Bergen on United States of Jihad, February 19, 2016, C-SPAN
- Washington Journal interview with Bergen on United States of Jihad, March 19, 2017, C-SPAN
- Washington Journal interview with Bergen on Trump and His Generals, December 23, 2019, C-SPAN
- Presentation by Bergen on The Rise and Fall of Osama bin Laden, August 9, 2021, C-SPAN

Holy War, Inc. (2001), a New York Times bestseller, and The Osama bin Laden I Know (2006) were named among the best non-fiction books of the year by The Washington Post. Documentaries based on both books were nominated for Emmy Awards in 2001 and 2006.

Holy War Inc. was translated into 17 languages. Jeff Stein in The Washington Post called Holy War "equal parts journalism, history, and whimsical travelogue." Michiko Kakutani in The New York Times states that Bergen "does a succinct job of pulling together a wealth of information into a coherent ... narrative ... that impresses upon the reader the crucial role that the Afghan-Soviet conflict played in radicalizing many Islamic militants ... and replacing the notion of Arab nationalism with that of a larger Islamist movement." Bruce Hoffman wrote in The Atlantic that Holy War gives a "unique perspective ... into bin Laden's mindset and behavior." For instance, he references bin Laden's education and work experience in his family's construction business that later informed his decisions on how to "transform Al Qaeda ... into the world's pre-eminent terrorist organization."

Bergen was the recipient of the 2000 Leonard Silk Journalism Fellowship and was the Pew Journalist in Residence at the School of Advanced International Studies at Johns Hopkins University in 2001 while writing Holy War, Inc.

His third book, The Longest War: The Enduring Conflict between America and Al-Qaeda (2011), a New York Times bestseller, gave an overview of the war on terror and was named by the Guardian and Newsweek as one of the key books about terrorism in the past decade. The Longest War also won the Washington Institute's Gold Prize for best book about the Middle East. and was named by Amazon, Kirkus and Foreign Policy as one of the best books of 2011.

Michiko Kakutani of The New York Times wrote that The Longest War is an "essential book" that provides a "succinct and compelling overview" of the war on terror. Thomas E. Ricks, also writing for The New York Times, declares that Bergen "covers it all," adding, "For years, I tried to read every new novel about how 9/11 affected our lives. None of the novels were as effective or moving as The Longest War, which is a history of our time."

Bergen's 2012 New York Times bestseller was Manhunt: The Ten-Year Search for Bin Laden From 9/11 to Abbottabad. The Washington Post named Manhunt one of the best non-fiction books of 2012, and The Guardian named it one of the key books on Islamist extremism. It was the 2012 Sunday Times (UK) Current Affairs Book of the Year. The book was awarded the Overseas Press Club Cornelius Ryan Award for best non-fiction book of 2012 on international affairs. The book was the basis of the HBO documentary film, Manhunt: The Search for Bin Laden, which premiered at the Sundance Film Festival winning the Grand Jury Prize Sundance 2013 and won the Emmy award for Outstanding Documentary in 2013. Bergen was the Executive Producer of the film. He was awarded the Stephen Ambrose History Award in 2014.

Manhunt was translated into 10 languages. Dina Temple-Raston in The Washington Post wrote Manhunt is "a real-life thriller that will be a must-read for years to come" and "crackles with insider details." Similarly, Duncan Gardham at The Telegraph called it a "rattling and thoroughly researched read on the last days of the world's most notorious terrorist." Michiko Kakutani at The New York Times favored the "fascinating . . . descriptions of internal debates within the Obama administration" in Manhunt, as well as the accounts of the work done by intelligence analysts to develop a method of tracking bin Laden down.

Bergen co-edited, with Katherine Tiedemann, Talibanistan: Negotiating the Borders Between Terror, Politics, and Religion, a collection of essays about the Taliban published by Oxford University Press in 2013. He co-edited, with Daniel Rothenberg, Drone Wars: Transforming Conflict, Law, and Policy, published by Cambridge University Press in 2014.

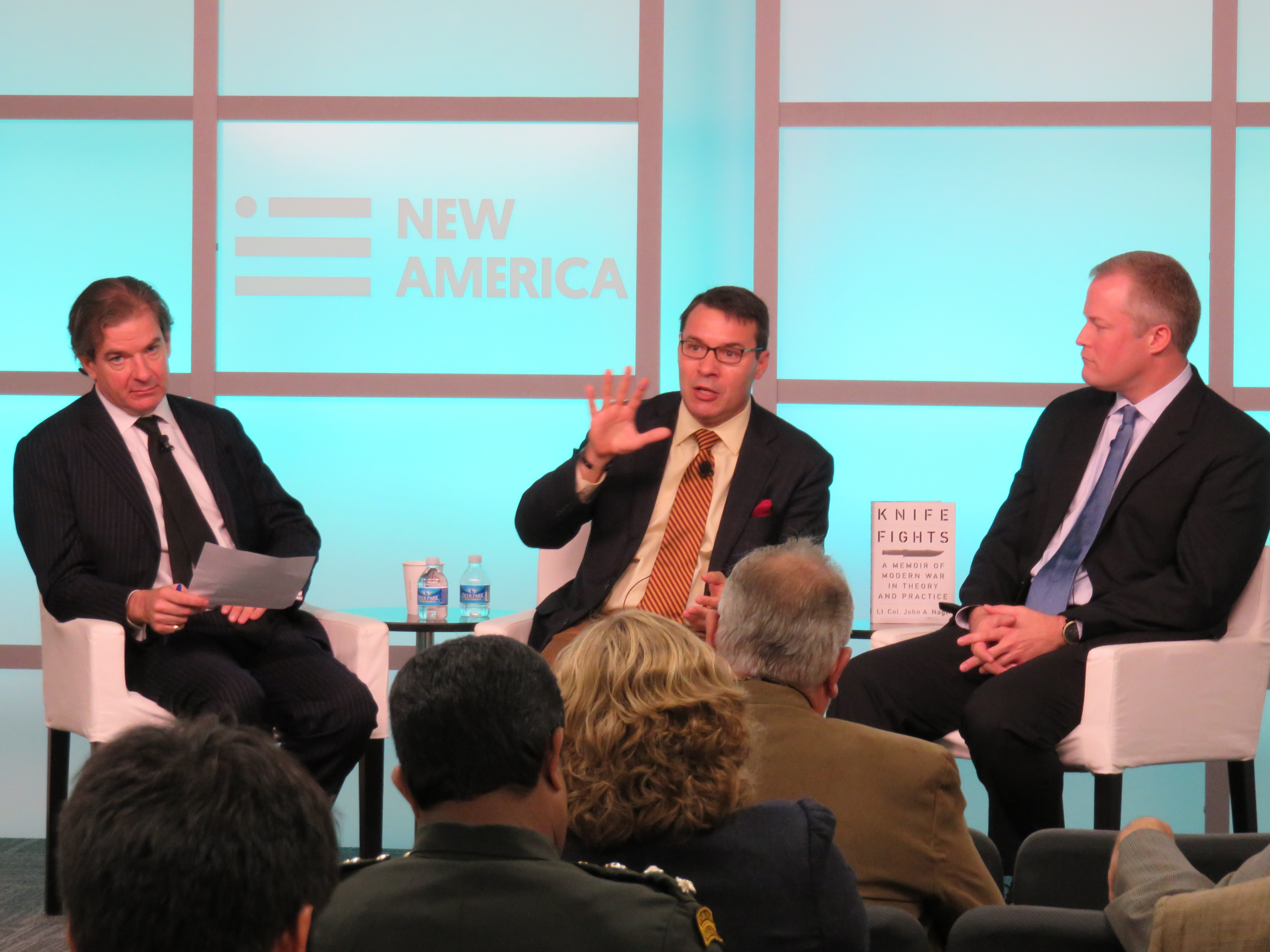
Left to right, Peter Bergen, John Nagl and Daniel R. Green, discussing Nagl's new book, Knife Fights: A Memoir of Modern War in Theory and Practice, at the New America Foundation, 27 October 2014

In 2016, Bergen published United States of Jihad: Investigating America's Homegrown Terrorists. It was named one of the best non-fiction books of 2016 by the Washington Post. HBO adapted the book for the documentary film, Homegrown: The Counterterror Dilemma.

In The New York Times, former Secretary of Homeland Security Janet Napolitano wrote that "Bergen's book is the best one-volume treatment available on the current state of jihad in America." Michiko Kakutani, also in the Times, wrote that Bergen's "profiles of jihadists . . . leave the reader with a harrowing appreciation of the banality of evil" and "Mr. Bergen's detailed accounts of terror plots (both executed, foiled or failed) make for chilling reading." Zach Dorfman in the Los Angeles Times assessed that "Bergen takes a generally skeptical view of the growth of the post-9/11 national security state and of the fear-mongering about Islam that has increasingly transfixed the darker crannies of American politics."

Bergen's Trump and His Generals: The Cost of Chaos was published in 2019. The Washington Post described it as "the best single account of Trump's foreign policy to date." In a 2019 interview at Fordham Law School, Bergen discussed the themes of Trump and His Generals. He examined the influence of senior military officers such as General James Mattis, Lieutenant General H.R. McMaster, and General John Kelly, and highlighted tensions between the generals and the president over strategic decisions, including the U.S. involvement in Afghanistan and Syria. He also addressed how the administration’s stance on NATO was shaped by Trump’s longstanding views about burden-sharing among allies and a broader desire to reduce American military commitments overseas.

Bergen published The Rise and Fall of Osama bin Laden in 2021. Named one of the Best Nonfiction Books of the Year by the Los Angeles Times and Kirkus Reviews, in the New York Times, Louise Richardson, vice chancellor of Oxford University, wrote that the book is “Meticulously documented…fluidly written…replete with riveting detail…" In The Guardian, author and journalist Jason Burke said the biography offered readers "an authoritative and convincing portrait of a man whose misdeeds changed all our lives in many ways, none for the better." Burke stressed how Bergen leveraged newly disclosed documents from the Abbottabad raid to present a nuanced portrayal of Osama bin Laden's private life.

His latest book, to be published around the 25th anniversary of 9/11 on September 8, 2026, is All the Presidents' Wars: Twenty-Five Years of America's War on Terror, which Kirkus Reviews gave a starred review, describing the book as "profoundly insightful." Foreign Affairs describes the book as "deeply reported" and "gripping" and urges "Every citizen—and especially those who will make U.S. policy in the future—should reckon with the primary lesson of All the Presidents' Wars: that legitimate fears and a quest for absolute security can lead a great power to overreach, with consequences no one can predict or easily reverse." In the New York Times, author Scott Anderson, wrote: "Quite early in “All the Presidents’ Wars,” the journalist Peter Bergen’s chronicle of the “war on terror,” the reader is likely to conclude that the groups of American officials who have presided over the past two and a half decades of conflict in the Middle East consist of idiots, fools or knaves. The further one progresses into this damning and meticulously researched book, the more this assessment seems confirmed."

== Documentaries, TV series, and podcast ==
Bergen has worked as a correspondent and producer for the National Geographic Channel, Discovery Channel, HBO, Showtime, and CNN Films.

Bergen has been nominated four times for Emmy Awards – in 1994 (CNN), 2001 (National Geographic), 2006 (CNN), and 2018 (CNN).

Four of Bergen's books have been made into documentaries for CNN, HBO and National Geographic. The documentaries based on Holy War, Inc. and The Osama bin Laden I Know were nominated for Emmys in 2001 and 2006. Bergen was a producer of those films. Manhunt was the basis of the HBO documentary film, Manhunt, which premiered at the Sundance Film Festival and won the Emmy Award for Outstanding Documentary in 2013. Bergen was Executive Producer of the film. HBO adapted United States of Jihad for the 2016 documentary film, Homegrown: The Counterterror Dilemma.

Between early 2023 and early 2025, he hosted the Audible podcast "In the Room with Peter Bergen." He was a producer of "Ghosts of Beirut" for Showtime in 2023, a docudrama series directed by Greg Barker that traced the long conflict between the CIA and Hezbollah.

He co-produced, with Tresha Mabile, the National Geographic Channel documentary, American War Generals (2014) which featured interviews with several high-ranking U.S. Army officers, including Colin Powell, Stanley McChrystal, and David Petraeus. The film examined both the Army's post-Vietnam restructuring and the difficulties encountered in the wars in Afghanistan and Iraq. In a commentary on the documentary, American journalist Thomas Ricks noted a tension between the Army's successful post-Vietnam rebuild and what he described as its insufficient preparedness for counterinsurgency conflicts in the early twenty-first century.

Bergen and Mabile produced CNN Films' Legion of Brothers, which premiered at Sundance in January 2017. It was released in theaters in June 2017. It was nominated for an Emmy for Outstanding Politics and Government documentary in 2018. In 2020, together with the producers of Homeland, he produced the Showtime documentary, The Longest War, which documented the CIA's long involvement in Afghanistan.

On May 2, 2016, the five-year anniversary of the death of Osama bin Laden, CNN aired the documentary We Got Him: President Obama, Bin Laden, and the Future of the War on Terror.

In addition to interviewing President Barack Obama in the Situation Room, Bergen also conducted the first in-depth interview with the architect of the bin Laden raid, Admiral William H. McRaven, as well as interviewing senior administration officials including former Secretary of State Hillary Clinton.

In 1997, as a producer for CNN, Bergen produced bin Laden's first television interview, in which he declared war against the United States for the first time to a Western audience. In 1994, he won the Overseas Press Club Edward R. Murrow award for best foreign affairs documentary for the CNN program Kingdom of Cocaine, which was also nominated for an Emmy.

Bergen co-produced the CNN documentary, Terror Nation, which traced the links between Afghanistan and the bombers who attacked the World Trade Center for the first time in 1993. The documentary, which was shot in Afghanistan during the civil war there and aired in 1994, concluded that the country would be the source of additional anti-Western terrorism. From 1998 to 1999, Bergen worked as a correspondent-producer for CNN. He also produced documentaries on the Clinton administration, the Cali Cartel, the 1994 Republican takeover of Congress, and advances in AIDS research. He was program editor for CNN Impact, a news magazine co-production of CNN and TIME, from 1997 to 1998.

Previously, he worked for CNN Special Assignment as a producer on a wide variety of international and U.S. national stories, including the first network interview with white supremacist author, William Luther Pierce. From 1985 to 1990 he worked for ABC News in New York. In 1983, he traveled to Pakistan for the first time with two friends to make a documentary about the Afghan refugees fleeing the Soviet invasion of their country. The subsequent documentary, Refugees of Faith, was shown on Channel 4 (UK).

=== Podcast ===
In early 2023, Bergen began hosting In the Room with Peter Bergen, a podcast covering global security issues—including subjects such as artificial intelligence, conflicts in the Middle East, and election integrity. Executive-produced by Alison Craiglow, the show featured both multi-guest discussions and one-on-one interviews; participants included, Thomas Friedman, Clarissa Ward, Fareed Zakaria, David Petraeus, Robert F. Kennedy Jr., Admiral William "Bill" McRaven, Anne Applebaum and Patrick Radden Keefe. The podcast received coverage on CNN, The Guardian, The Hill, NPR, Politico, Rolling Stone, and USA Today, It won a Sigma Chi Delta Award for "Best Conversational Podcast" and Signal Award for Best News & Politics series podcast, Gold Award in 2024.

== Journalism ==
Bergen has reported on al-Qaeda, Afghanistan, Pakistan, Iraq, ISIS and counterterrorism and homeland security for a variety of American newspapers and magazines including The New York Times, The Los Angeles Times, Foreign Affairs, The Washington Post, Wall Street Journal, The Atlantic, Rolling Stone, Time, The Nation, The National Interest, Mother Jones, Newsweek, and Vanity Fair. He has written some five hundred articles for CNN.com.

His story on extraordinary rendition for Mother Jones was part of a package of stories nominated for a 2008 National Magazine Award. He has written for newspapers and magazines around the world such as The Guardian, The Times, The Daily Telegraph, International Herald Tribune, Prospect, El Mundo, La Repubblica, The National, Die Welt, and Der Spiegel.

In 2015, Seymour Hersh criticized Bergen for "view[ing] himself as the trustee of all things Bin Laden" after Bergen wrote a piece for CNN.com disputing what he called Hersh's revisionist account in the London Review of Books about the raid that killed bin Laden. Bergen wrote that Hersh's account was "a farrago of nonsense that is contravened by a multitude of eyewitness accounts, inconvenient facts and simple common sense."

== Publications ==
=== Books ===
- All the Presidents' Wars: Twenty-Five Years of America''s War on Terror, NY: Norton, September 2026

Philip H. Gordon, "What Was the War on Terror? A Quarter Century of Fear and Fantasy" (review of Peter Bergen, All the Presidents' Wars: Twenty-Five Years of America's War on Terror, Norton, 2026, 432 pp.), Foreign Affairs, vol. 105, no. 5 (September/October 2026), pp. 196–201. "According to Bergen's estimates, the wars in Iraq and Afghanistan cost the United States at least $4 trillion [p. 198] ($6 trillion, if military pensions are included). Some 7,000 U.S. service members lost their lives, alongside an estimated 8,000 contractors. Conservative estimates suggest that 200,000 Iraqis were killed, as were tens of thousands of Afghans. ... The United States ... had to respond militarily to the worst attack on its soil in history [9/11]. But it did not have to pursue a sprawling, global war on terror that went well beyond destroying terrorists who threatened the United States and instead set out to somehow eliminate terrorism as a political tool and transform the entire Middle East." (p. 199.)

- The Rise and Fall of Osama bin Laden. New York, NY: Simon and Schuster. 2021.
- Trump and His Generals: The Cost of Chaos. New York, NY: Penguin Random House. 2019.
- United States of Jihad: Investigating America's Homegrown Terrorists. New York, NY: Crown Publishing Group. 2016.
- Manhunt: The Ten-Year Search for Bin Laden From 9/11 to Abbottabad. New York, NY: Crown. 2012.
- The Longest War: The Enduring Conflict between America and Al-Qaeda. New York, NY: Free Press. 2011.
- The Osama bin Laden I Know: An Oral History of al Qaeda's Leader. New York, NY: Free Press. 2006.
- Holy War, Inc. New York, NY: Free Press. 2001.
- Understanding the New Proxy Wars. New York, NY: Oxford University Press. 2022. (Co-editor with Candace Rondeaux, Daniel Rothenberg, and David Sterman)
- Drone Wars: Transforming Conflict, Law, and Policy. New York, NY: Cambridge University Press. 2014. (Co-editor with Daniel Rothenberg)
- Talibanistan: Negotiating the Borders Between Terror, Politics, and Religion. New York, NY: Oxford University Press. 2013. (Co-editor with Katherine Tiedemann)

Non-US publishers

Holy War, Inc. (2001) Spain/Spanish (Grijalbo) Bulgaria/Bulgarian (Prozoretz) Italy/Italian (Mondadori) Czech Republic/Czech (Cesty) Germany/German (Berlin Verlag) Japan/Japanese (Shogakukan) France/French (Gallimard) Romania/Romanian (Editura Alfa, Streamland Ltd.) Norway/Norwegian (N.W. Damm & Son A/S/Hjemmets) Dutch/Holland (Strengholt) Taiwan/Chinese (China Times Publishing Company) Serbia/Serbian (Nedeljni Telegraf) Turkey/Turkish (Center for Interactive Dialogue & Coop) Russia/Russian (CIDC Publishing) Japan/Japanese IShogakukan) Korea/Korean (Myuang Sang Publishing) Slovak Republic/Slovak (Ottovo Nakladatelstvi) Greek/Greece (Lvanis Publishing Organization) UK/English (Weidenfeld & Nicolson)

The Osama bin Laden I Know (2006) Spain/Spanish (Debate) France/French (Michel Lafon) Poland/Polish (PIW/Panstwowy) Afghanistan/Pashtu (Aazem Publishing House) UK/English (Simon & Schuster)

The Longest War: The Enduring Conflict Between America and Al-Qaeda (2011) Hong Kong/Chinese (CNHK Publications) UK/English (Simon & Schuster)

Manhunt: The Ten-Year Search For bin Laden from 9/11 to Abbottabad (2012) Portugal/Portuguese (Dom Quixote) Germany/German (Deutsche Verlags-Anstalt) Denmark/Danish (Jyllands-Postens Forlag) India/Marathi (Diamond Books) Iran/Persian (Milkan) Norway/Norwegian (Cappelen Damm) France/French (Robert Laffont) UK/English (Bodley Head) Brazil/ Portuguese (Amarilys) Holland/Dutch (the house of books) Canada/English (Doubleday) Pakistan/ Urdu (Mashal Books)

The Rise and Fall of Osama bin Laden (2021) Finland/Finnish (Docendo) UK/English (Simon & Schuster)

All the Presidents’ Wars (2026) UK,AUS,NZ/English (Scribe)

== Congressional testimony ==
- US House Committee on Homeland Security, Global Terrorism: Threats to the Homeland. 10 September 2019.
- US House Committee on Homeland Security, Counterterrorism and Intelligence Subcommittee The Future of Counterterrorism: Addressing the Evolving Threat to Domestic Security. 28 February 2017.
- US Senate Committee on Homeland Security, Permanent Subcommittee on Investigations. ISIS Online: Countering Terrorist Radicalization & Recruitment on the Internet & Social Media. 6 July 2016.
- Statement to the U.S. Senate Committee on Homeland Security and Governmental Affairs. The Impact of ISIS on the Homeland and Refugee Resettlement. 19 November 2015.
- Statement to a Joint Hearing of the U.S. House Committee on Homeland Security and the House Committee on Foreign Affairs. The Rise of Radicalism: Growing Terrorist Sanctuaries and the Threat to the U.S. Homeland. 18 November 2015.
- Statement to the US Senate Committee on the Judiciary, Subcommittee on the Constitution. Drone Wars: The Constitutional and Counterterrorism Implications of Targeted Killing. 23 April 2013.
- Statement to the House Committee on Foreign Affairs. After the Withdrawal: The Way Forward in Afghanistan and Pakistan. 19 March 2013.
- "Ten Years On: The Evolution of the Terrorist Threat Since 9/11". US House Armed Services Committee on Emerging Threats. May 25, 2011.
- Statement to the House Committee on Homeland Security. Threats to the American Homeland: An Assessment Archived December 20, 2014, at the Wayback Machine. 24 May 2011.
- Statement to the Senate Foreign Relations Committee. Al Qaeda, the Taliban, and Other Extremist Groups in Pakistan. 15 September 2010.
- "The Evolving Nature of Terrorism Nine Years after the 9/11 Attacks". gpo.gov. November 19, 2009. Statement to the House Homeland Security Committee.
- Statement to the House Oversight Subcommittee on National Security and Foreign Affairs. Afghanistan and Pakistan: Understanding a Complex Threat Environment. 4 March 2009.
- "Reassessing the Evolving al-Qaeda Threat to the Homeland". US House Homeland Security Committee, Subcommittee on Intelligence. March 4, 2009.
- "Reassessing the Threat: The Future of Al Qaeda and its Implications for Homeland Security". US House Homeland Security, Subcommittee on Intelligence. July 30, 2008.
- Statement to the Senate Foreign Relations Committee. Confronting al Qaeda: Understanding the Threat in Afghanistan and Beyond. 30 July 2008.
- Statement to the House Permanent Select Committee on Intelligence. Assessing the Fight Against al Qaeda. 9 April 2008.
- "Afghanistan on the Brink: Where do we go from Here?" (PDF). US House Committee on Foreign Affairs. February 15, 2007.
- US House Committee on International Relations. Islamic Extremism in Europe. 27 April 2005.

== Documentaries, TV series, podcasts ==
- In the Room with Peter Bergen, Audible, 2023/2024/2025. Host.
- Ghosts of Beirut, Showtime, 2023. Producer.
- The Fall of Osama bin Laden, National Geographic, 2022. Producer & Correspondent.
- The Longest War, Showtime, 2020. Producer.
- Bin Laden's Hard Drive, National Geographic, 2020. Producer & Correspondent.
- Legion of Brothers, CNN Films, 2017. Producer. Nominated for Emmy for Outstanding Politics and Government Documentary.
- Six, History, 2017 and 2018. Consulting Producer.
- Road to 9/11, History, 2017. Consultant.
- "We Got Him": President Obama, Bin Laden, and the Future of the War on Terror, CNN, 2016. Correspondent.
- Homegrown: The Counterterror Dilemma, HBO, 2016. Executive Producer. Adapted from Bergen's book United States of Jihad.
- American War Generals, National Geographic, 2014. Executive Producer, producer, Writer.
- Manhunt, HBO, 2012. Executive Producer. Won 2013 Emmy for Best Documentary. Based on Bergen's book of the same name.
- The Last Days of Osama bin Laden, National Geographic, 2011. Correspondent.
- Mission Ops: Assignment IEDs, Discovery, 2007. Correspondent.
- In the Footsteps of Osama bin Laden, CNN, 2006. Producer. Nominated for 2006 Emmy for Best News Documentary and named Best Documentary of 2006 by the Society of Professional Journalists. Based on Bergen's book The Osama bin Laden I Know.
- Al Qaeda 2.0, Discovery, 2003. Correspondent.
- Blinding Horizon, National Geographic, 2002. Correspondent.
- Holy War, Inc., National Geographic, 2001. Producer. Nominated for 2001 Emmy for Research. Based on Bergen's book of the same name.
- Osama bin Laden: Holy Terror? CNN, 1997. Producer.

== Awards and nominations ==
- 2026 "All the Presidents' Wars": Kirkus, Best Nonfiction books 2026; Council on Foreign Relations Essential Read to Understand Foreign Policy Better. A New York Times Book Review Editors' Choice.
- 2024 "In the Room with Peter Bergen" Signal Awards—Best News & Politics series podcast, Gold Award. "In the Room with Peter Bergen" Society of Professional Journalists: Sigma Chi Delta Award, “Best Conversational Podcast” - Winner. Shorty Awards, “Best News and Politics” Podcast Award, Nominated/Finalist for "In the Room with Peter Bergen"
- 2023 Signal Awards “Best Host for a Limited Series” podcast - Winner for "In the Room with Peter Bergen"
- 2023 International Public Service Award, American University of Afghanistan
- 2021 "The Rise and Fall of Osama bin Laden" named one of the Best Nonfiction Books of the Year by the Los Angeles Times, and Kirkus Reviews.
- 2018 Emmy Nomination for Outstanding Politics and Government documentary for Legion of Brothers.
- 2016 "United States of Jihad: Investigating America's Homegrown Terrorists" was named one of the notable non-fiction books of 2016 by The Washington Post.
- 2014 Rutgers University's Stephen E. Ambrose Oral History Award.
- 2012 Cornelius Ryan Award, Overseas Press Club, for Manhunt. Best non-fiction book on international affairs. The Washington Post named "Manhunt" one of the notable non-fiction books of 2012, and The Guardian named it one of the key books on Islamist extremism. It was the 2012 Sunday Times (UK) Current Affairs Book of the Year.
- 2011 Gold Prize, Washington Institute for Near East Policy, for The Longest War. Best book on the Middle East., WINEP Press Release. Accessed July 30, 2023 "The Longest War" was named by The Guardian and Newsweek as one of the key books about terrorism in the past decade and was named by Amazon, Kirkus, and Foreign Policy as one of the best books of 2011.
- 2008 National Magazine Award nomination for a story on extraordinary rendition, which was part of the series "Torture Hits Home" by Mother Jones.
- 2006 "The Osama bin Laden I Know" was named among the best non-fiction books of the year by The Washington Post.
- 2006 Emmy Award nomination for Outstanding Continuing Coverage of a News Story—Long Form for CNN's In the Footsteps of Bin Laden. 28th Annual News & Documentary Emmy Award nominations.
- 2006 Best Documentary, Society of Professional Journalists, for CNN's In the Footsteps of Bin Laden.
- 2002 Life Member, Council on Foreign Relations
- 2002 New America Fellowship
- 2002 Headliner Award for Attacks on America and Their Aftermath as part of CNN's Investigation Team.
- 2001 "Holy War, Inc." was named among the best non-fiction books of the year by The Washington Post
- 2001 Emmy Award nomination for Outstanding Individual Achievement in a Craft: Research for Holy War, Inc., a National Geographic documentary.
- 2001 Leonard Silk Journalism Fellowship, Century Foundation, for Holy War, Inc..
- 2001 Pew Journalist-in-Residence, School of Advanced International Studies, Johns Hopkins University.
- 1997 Joan Shorenstein Barone award for Washington Reporting.
- 1997 Term Member, Council on Foreign Relations
- 1997 National Headliner Award for CNN's Democracy in America series.
- 1997 Livingston Award finalist for CNN's War on the Cocaine Cartel.
- 1994 Emmy Award nomination for Outstanding Individual Achievement in a Craft: Writers for CNN's Kingdom of Cocaine.
- 1994 Edward R. Murrow Award, Overseas Press Club, for Kingdom of Cocaine.

== Personal life ==
Bergen married documentary director/producer Tresha Mabile. They have two children.

== See also ==
- Manhunt: The Search for Bin Laden — HBO film based on Manhunt: The Ten-Year Search for Bin Laden from 9/11 to Abbottabad.
- A Very Stable Genius — similar topics as Bergen's Trump and His Generals: The Cost of Chaos
