= Holy War, Inc. =

2001 book by Peter Bergen

- Author: Peter Bergen
- Language: English
- Genre: Political
- Publisher: Free Press
- Publication date: November 14, 2001
- Publication place: United States
- Media type: Print
- ISBN: 0-7432-0502-2
- OCLC: 50128872

Holy War, Inc.: Inside the Secret World of Bin Laden is a book by CNN investigative journalist and documentarian Peter Bergen. It was published in November 2001, two months after the September 11 attacks, and was a New York Times Best Seller in 2001.

In the book, Bergen discusses the meteoric rise of Osama bin Laden during the Soviet invasion of Afghanistan in the 1980s, and the subsequent evolution and expansion of his terrorist organization, Al-Qaeda. Bergen interviewed bin Laden in person with former CNN journalist Peter Arnett in Afghanistan in 1997.

Holy War, Inc. provides a multi-faceted context that details: (1) how jihadist terrorism evolved from being primarily state-sponsored groups to the independent and sophisticated multinational organization that is Al Qaeda; (2) who made up the groups of people that were willing to leave behind the comforts of home to join what would later become Al Qaeda; (3) where the US went wrong in its covert sponsorship of militants who fought against the Soviet invasion of Afghanistan in the 1980s; (4) what motivates bin Laden and his disciples to attack the US and other Western targets; and (5) why bin Laden is revered by many throughout the Muslim world.

As Bergen finds, the Soviet–Afghan War had the dual result of making bin Laden famous while also giving bin Laden a feeling that he could go toe-to-toe against a superpower with his "holy warriors" and prevail. These factors, coupled with bin Laden's strong feelings of resentment toward the US for its presence in Saudi Arabia (or the "Land of the Two Holy Places" as he called it) during and after the Persian Gulf War, led to his plotting multiple attacks against the US, and then later to an all-out declaration of war against the West. Ultimately, by green-lighting the September 11 attacks on the United States, bin Laden would then get his desired war.

Holy War was published by Free Press in 2001 as a hardcover (ISBN 0-7432-0502-2). In the same year, Simon & Schuster audio released an abridged audiobook on CD (ISBN 0-7435-2465-9) and audio cassette (ISBN 0-7435-2464-0). Thorndike Press published a largeprint edition in hardcover in 2002 (ISBN 0-7862-4035-0). Free Press released a paperback edition in 2002 (ISBN 0-7432-3495-2). Orion Publishing Company published a paperback in 2004 (ISBN 0-7538-1668-7). The book was translated into 18 languages: Bulgarian, Chinese, Czech, Dutch, French, German, Greek, Italian, Japanese, Korean, Portuguese, Norwegian, Romanian, Russian, Serbian, Slovak, Spanish, and Turkish.

== Critical reactions ==
Jeff Stein at The Washington Post called Holy War, "equal parts journalism, history and whimsical travelogue." Roger Hardy of BBC News praised Bergen's "eye for detail," noting that Bergen conducted "extensive interviews in many of the key locations ... in the Middle East" and that he "pinned down elusive facts" while offering few theories. Michiko Kakutani at The New York Times states that Bergen "does a succinct job of pulling together a wealth of information into a coherent ... narrative ... that impresses upon the reader the crucial role that the Afghan-Soviet conflict played in radicalizing many Islamic militants ... and replacing the notion of Arab nationalism with that of a larger Islamist movement."

L. Carl Brown, writing for Foreign Affairs magazine, called Bergen's work a "first-rate account" of Osama bin Laden's "secret world" and of the personnel who carried out various terrorist attacks against the United States between the early 1990s and 2000. Bruce Hoffman writes in The Atlantic that Holy War gives a "unique perspective ... into bin Laden's mindset and behavior." For instance, he references bin Laden's education and work experience in his family's construction business that later informed his decisions on how to "transform Al Qaeda ... into the world's pre-eminent terrorist organization."
