= The Osama bin Laden I Know =

2006 book by Peter Bergen

- Author: Peter Bergen
- Language: English
- Genre: Political
- Publisher: Free Press
- Publication date: August 8, 2006
- Publication place: United States
- Media type: Print
- ISBN: 978-0-7432-7891-1

Peter Bergen's The Osama bin Laden I Know (ISBN 978-0-7432-7891-1) is a book published in 2006. It is a comprehensive collection of personal accounts by people who met Osama bin Laden or worked with him at various stages of his terrorist career.

== Summary ==
Peter Bergen’s 2006 book, The Osama bin Laden I Know: An Oral History of Al-Qaeda’s Leader, reads like an encyclopedia on the subject of Osama bin Laden. From the beginning stages of bin Laden’s life in the port city of Jeddah, Saudi Arabia, to the founding of his Al-Qaeda organization in the wake of the Soviet invasion of Afghanistan, and further on, bin Laden’s jihad against the United States, culminating in the September 11 attacks in the United States, Bergen’s work takes a personal approach with his research.

Bergen interviewed key witnesses such as Khaled Batarfi, bin Laden’s next-door neighbor in Jeddah, who recalled that the young bin Laden enjoyed American television programs and especially Bruce Lee movies at the same time that he was notably religious, even as a teenager. Later, the reader is shown minutes of the meeting where bin Laden and several others created Al-Qaeda. At another point, the transcript of an interrogation of Shadi Abdalla by German police reveals how he became bin Laden’s bodyguard, and a part of his inner circle, in 2000. Further excerpts exhibit a divide within Al-Qaeda over the September 11th attacks, with some members of the group stating that they felt that it was wrong to use airliners to attack the World Trade Center, resulting in the deaths of women, children, and citizens of neutral nations.

Later on, the reader is given access to materials showing Al-Qaeda was hopeful about acquiring weapons of mass destruction, including nuclear material. Finally, Bergen ponders bin Laden’s legacy and notes that bin Laden had “painted [himself] into a corner, where [the] only strategy [was] to call for more violence.” As we now know, bin Laden’s affiliates in Iraq would heed this call via their evolution into ISIS.

== Reception ==
Former counterterrorism advisor to George W. Bush, Richard A. Clarke, in The Washington Post calls Bergen’s work a “go-to resource” that provides insight into the life of Osama bin Laden with a level of detail that is unprecedented. Max Rodenbeck of The New York Review of Books, says that Bergen has created a “fascinating sequence of oblique-angled perspectives, casting light on the underlying motives of bin Laden and his companions and revealing some of his less-remarked but significant adventures.”

L. Carl Brown at Foreign Affairs Magazine praises Bergen’s ability to create a “coherent and dramatic account” from such a large collection of individual sources. Barry Rubin in the Claremont Review of Books offers that Bergen’s book is a “remarkable read,” and says that while “the constant switching of sources is somewhat jarring, the book provides the clearest narrative account of bin Laden’s life.” Writing for The Guardian, Jason Burke calls The Osama bin Laden I Know, “simply one of the most important works to have been published [about bin Laden].”
