= Manhunt: The Ten-Year Search for Bin Laden From 9/11 to Abbottabad =

2012 book by Peter Bergen

- First edition
- Author: Peter Bergen
- Language: English
- Genre: Political
- Publisher: Crown Publishing Group
- Publication date: May 1, 2012
- Publication place: United States
- Media type: Print
- ISBN: 978-0-307-95588-3

Manhunt: The Ten Year Search for Bin Laden From 9/11 to Abbottabad is Peter Bergen's fourth book on the subject of Osama bin Laden and Al-Qaeda. It was originally published in 2012 and became a New York Times bestseller later that year. It would then become the basis for an HBO documentary, Manhunt: The Search for Bin Laden.

== Overview ==
Manhunt chronicles the U.S. government’s decade-long search for the leader of Al-Qaeda, Osama bin Laden. From the outset, Bergen’s narrative engrosses the reader with a detailed review of the diverse intelligence gathering process following the September 11 attacks that ultimately led to the Navy SEAL raid which killed Osama bin Laden nearly ten years later. Additionally, it sheds light on the operational dynamics within Al-Qaeda, and how it continued to plot and carry out attacks (and attempted attacks) while facing a furious bombing campaign and assassination operations by the US military and the CIA in Afghanistan, Pakistan, and other nations.

In this chronological review of the intelligence Bergen describes the actions of decision-makers as they attempt to locate the world’s most high-profile fugitive. He explains one CIA analyst’s “four pillars” approach to tracking down bin Laden through: his family; his contacts with the media; his communications with other Al-Qaeda operatives; and his use of a courier network. Bergen argues the specific focus on the courier network is what finally provided the breakthrough in the case after years and years of searching. However, even after locating the compound where CIA analysts suspected bin Laden was hiding, there was significant uncertainty about whether he was actually there.

Ultimately, the heavy burden of deciding whether to attack the compound, and how, fell to President Barack Obama. We find out that at the time of his decision, from the available intelligence, Obama believed that the odds were about "fifty-fifty" that bin Laden was actually in the compound. Despite that uncertainty and the advice of Vice President Joe Biden and Defense Secretary Robert Gates telling him not to go, and despite the very real chance that the raid would greatly strain relations with Pakistan, Obama gave the green light.

== Reactions ==
Lawrence Freedman in Foreign Affairs states that Manhunt is "full of fascinating details" and reveals the immense strain placed upon the US national security apparatus (and in particular the CIA) in their hunt for Osama bin Laden. Dina Temple-Raston in The Washington Post wrote the book is "a real-life thriller that will be a must-read for years to come" and which "crackles with insider details". Similarly, Duncan Gardham at The Telegraph called it a "rattling and thoroughly researched read on the last days of the world's most notorious terrorist."

Michiko Kakutani at The New York Times favored the "fascinating . . . descriptions of internal debates within the Obama administration" in Manhunt, as well as the accounts of the work done by intelligence analysts to develop a method of tracking bin Laden down. Joshua Sinai at The Washington Times wrote, "Mr. Bergen has produced a masterful account of bin Laden’s life and activities, [as well as] how al Qaeda operated in the aftermath of Sept. 11."
