= Blue Angels =

United States Navy's flight demonstration squadron

Blue Angels U.S. Navy flight demonstration squadron
- Blue Angels insignia
- Active: 24 April 1946–present
- Country: United States
- Branch: United States Navy
- Role: Aerobatic flight demonstration team
- Size: Navy: 13 officers Marine Corps: 4 officers Navy & Marine Corps: 100+ enlisted personnel
- Garrison/HQ: Naval Air Station Pensacola, Florida; NAF El Centro, California (Winter Facility)
- Nickname: The Blues
- Colors: "Blue Angel" blue "Insignia" yellow
- Website: www.blueangels.navy.mil

Commanders
- Current commander: CAPT Adam L. Bryan

Aircraft flown
- Fighter: Navy: F/A-18E Super Hornets (single seat) (Demonstrations use F/A-18Es #1 to 6; backup is a pair of F/A-18Fs #7)
- Transport: Marine Corps: 1 C-130J Super Hercules

The Blue Angels, formally named the U.S. Navy Flight Demonstration Squadron, is a United States Navy flight demonstration squadron. Formed in 1946, the unit is the second-oldest formal aerobatic team in the world, following the Patrouille de France, which formed in 1931. The team has six pilots from the U.S. Navy (USN) and one from the U.S. Marine Corps (USMC). They fly the Boeing F/A-18E/F Super Hornet and the Lockheed Martin C-130J Super Hercules.

Blue Angels typically perform in 60 or more shows annually at 32 locations throughout the United States and two shows in Canada. The "Blues" still employ many of the same practices and techniques used in the inaugural 1946 season. An estimated 11 million spectators view the squadron during air shows from March through November each year. The Blue Angels visit more than 50,000 people in schools, hospitals, and community functions at air show cities. Since 1946, the Blue Angels have flown for more than 505 million spectators. In 2011, the Blue Angels received $37 million from the annual Department of Defense budget.

== Mission ==
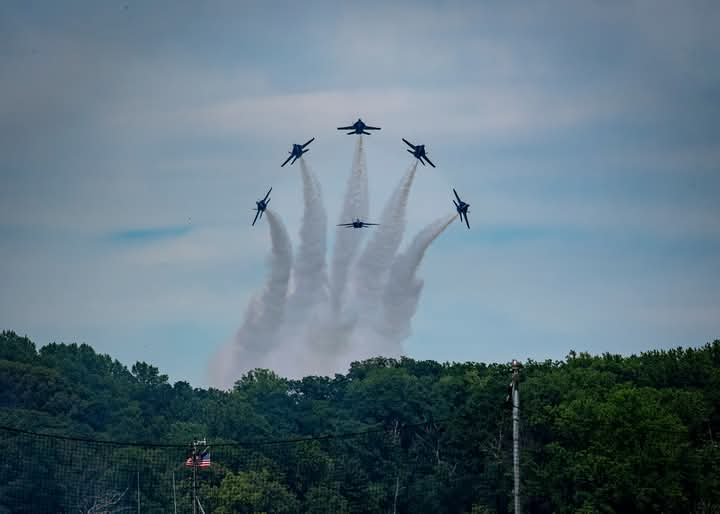
Blue Angels Delta Breakout

Their mission is to showcase the pride and professionalism of the United States Navy and Marine Corps by inspiring a culture of excellence and service to the country through flight demonstrations and community outreach.

== Air shows ==
The Blue Angels perform at military and nonmilitary airfields and at major U.S. cities and capitals; locations in Canada are often included in the air show schedule. They also performed near Mexico City in the mid–1960s.

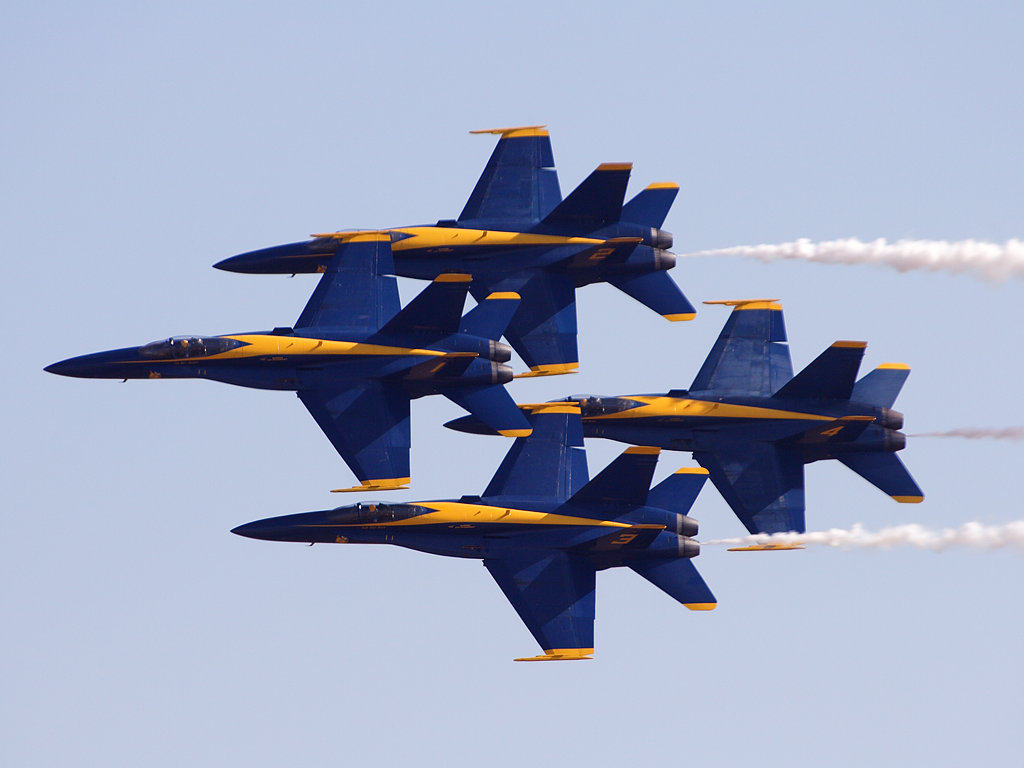
The Blue Angels F/A-18 Hornets "1–4" fly in a tight diamond formation, maintaining 18-inch (0.5 m) wingtip-to-canopy separation

During their aerobatic demonstration, the six-member team have flown F/A-18 Hornets, split into the diamond formation (Blue Angels 1 through 4) and the lead and opposing solos (Blue Angels 5 and 6). Most of the show alternates between maneuvers performed by the diamond formation and those performed by the solos. The diamond, in tight formation and usually at lower speeds (400 mph), performs maneuvers such as formation loops, rolls, and transitions from one formation to another. The solos showcase the high-performance capabilities of their individual aircraft through the execution of high-speed passes, slow passes, fast rolls, slow rolls, and tight turns.

The highest speed flown during an air show is 700 mph (just under Mach 1), while the lowest speed is 126 mph (110 knots) during Section High Alpha with the new Super Hornet (about 115 knots with the old "Legacy" Hornet). Some maneuvers include both solo aircraft performing at once, such as opposing passes (toward each other in what appears to be a collision course) and mirror formations (back-to-back, belly-to-belly, or wingtip-to-wingtip, with one jet flying inverted). The solos join the diamond formation near the end of the show for maneuvers in delta formation.

The parameters of each show are tailored in accordance with showtime weather conditions; in clear weather, the high show is performed; in overcast conditions, a low show is performed, and in limited visibility (weather permitting) the flat show is presented. The high show requires at least an 8,000-foot (2,400 m) ceiling and visibility of at least 3 nautical miles (6 km) from the show's center point. The minimum ceilings allowed for low and flat shows are 4,500 feet, and 1,500 feet respectively.

== Aircraft ==
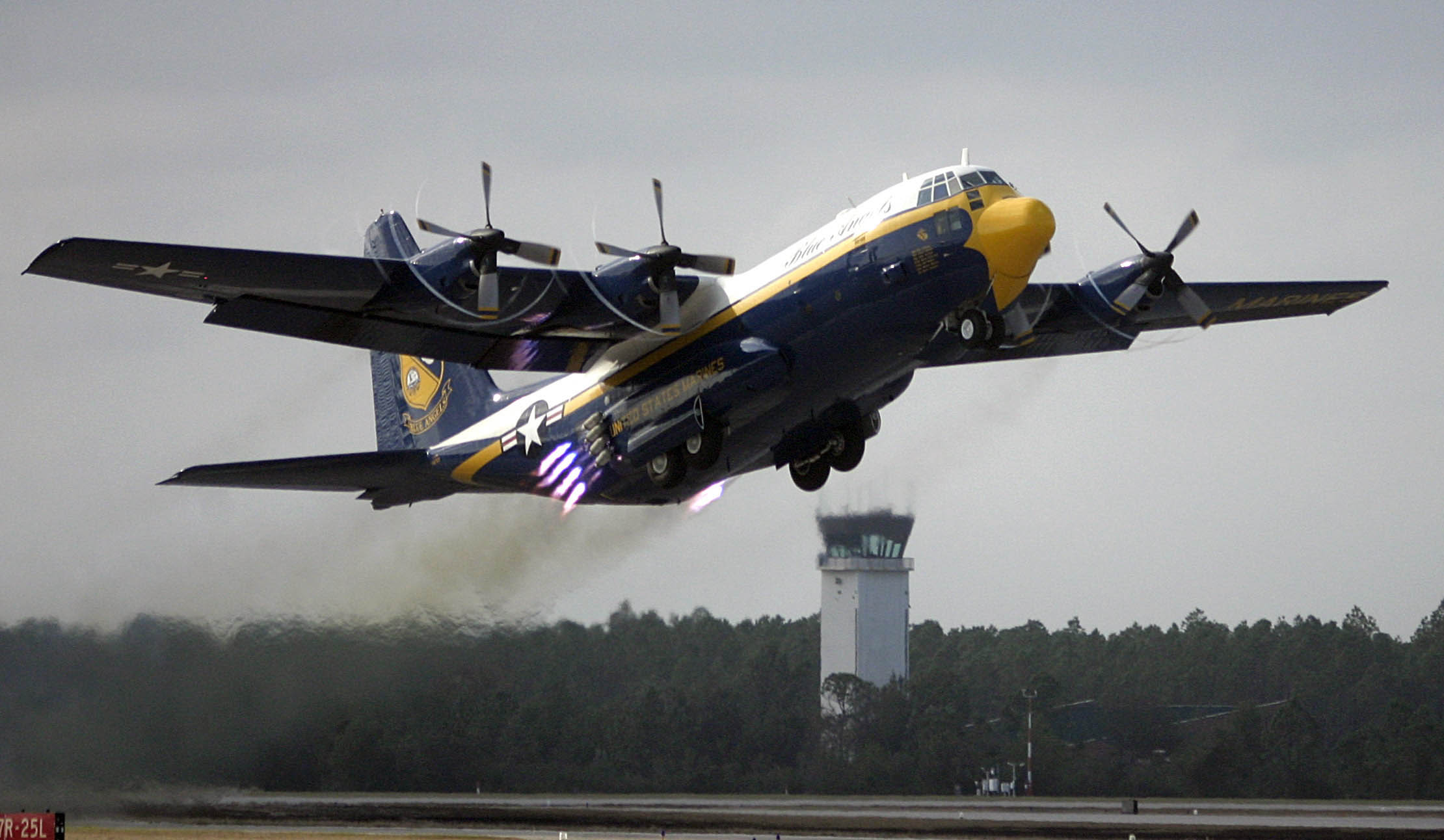
Blue Angels' Marine Corps Lockheed C-130 Hercules Fat Albert conducting a rocket-assisted takeoff (RATO)

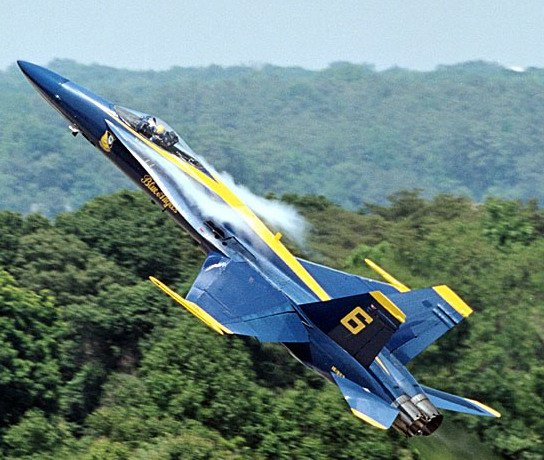
Water condensation in the strake vortices of a Blue Angels Hornet

The team flies the Boeing F/A-18 Super Hornet.

In August 2018, Boeing was awarded a contract to convert nine single-seat F/A-18E Super Hornets and two F/A-18F two-seaters for Blue Angels use. Modifications include removal of the weapons and replacement with a tank that contains smoke-oil used in demonstrations and outfitting the control stick with a spring system for more precise control input. Control sticks are tensioned with 40 lb (18 kg) of force to allow the pilot minimal room for noncommanded movement of the aircraft. Each modified F/A-18 remains in the fleet and can be returned to combat duty within 72 hours. As converted aircraft were delivered, they were used for testing maneuvers starting in mid 2020. The team's Super Hornets became operational by the beginning of 2021, their 75th-anniversary year.

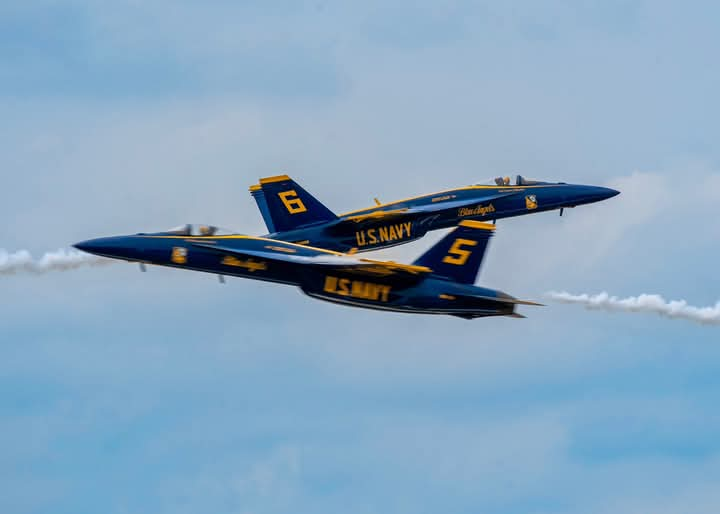
Blue Angels Solo performing the Vertical Pitch at Golden Isles Airshow, Brunswick, Georgia, Day 2

The show's narrator, Blue Angels No. 7, flies a two-seat F/A-18F Super Hornet to show sites. The Blues use these jets for backups or spares and to give demonstration rides to civilian VIPs. Usually, two back-seat rides are available at each air show; one goes to a member of the press and the other to the "key influencer". The No. 4 Slot Pilot often flies the No. 7 aircraft in Friday's "practice", so that pilots from the fleet and future team members can experience the show.

In 2020, the USMC Blue Angels purchased a surplus Royal Air Force Lockheed C-130J Super Hercules (RAF registration ZH885, US registration 170000) as the new Fat Albert for their logistics, carrying spare parts, equipment, and support personnel between shows.

=== Historical ===
==== F6F Hellcat ====
The Grumman F6F Hellcat was the first aircraft flown. The pilots were advanced flight instructors who had flown the aircraft in war. They were painted in dark navy blue with gold lettering and made their first flight demonstration on 10 May 1946.

==== F8F Bearcat ====
The Grumman F8F Bearcat began flying towards the end of the first season for the team. It was their last propeller-driven aircraft and the first to fly the diamond formation. The Bearcats first appeared in Denver in August 1946.

==== F9F-2 Panther ====
The F9F-2 Panther was the first jet used. After a temporary disbandment for the Korean War, with the unit serving with VMF-191, when reactivated on 25 October 1951, the Panther returned to service.

==== F-9 Cougar ====
In the winter of 1954/55, the Angels began flying the Grumman F-9 Cougar, serving until the middle of 1957.

==== F-11 Tiger ====
In mid–1957, Grumman F-11 Tigers began flying with the Blue Angels. The F11F-1 was the first supersonic jet and the last Grumman plane serving the flight team. It was used until 1969, though it had earlier been withdrawn from frontline service. It was one of the most popular aircraft with the public, because of its afterburner and sleek lines.

==== F-4 Phantom II ====
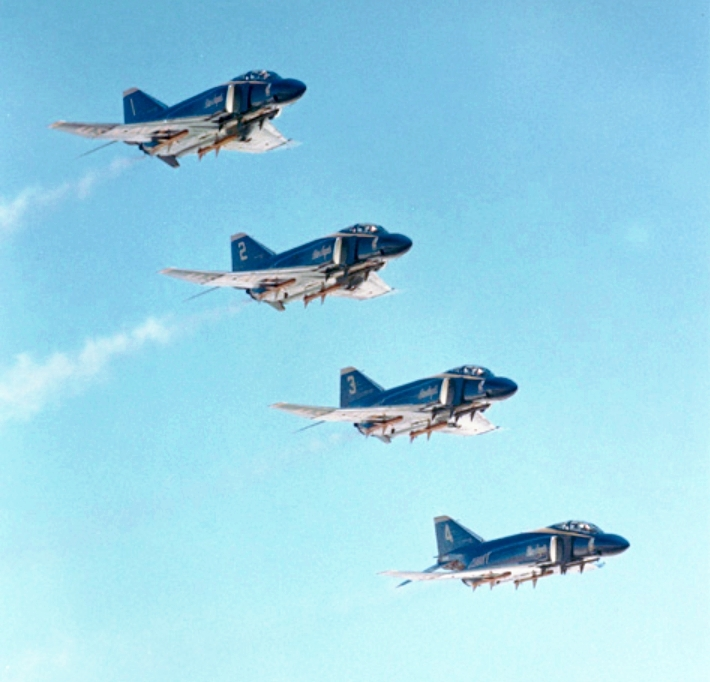
Blue Angels team with F-4J Phantoms, 1969

In 1969, the McDonnell Douglas F-4 Phantom II became the plane of choice, serving until December 1974. The F-4 was operated by both the Navy Blue Angels and Air Force Thunderbirds demonstration teams. In 1973, Secretary of the Navy John Warner set up a panel to determine why the F-4 was having so many accidents, and if the team should continue at all. This proposal was supported by many Democrats in Congress, who were looking to downsize the military in the wake of the Vietnam War.

==== A-4 Skyhawk ====
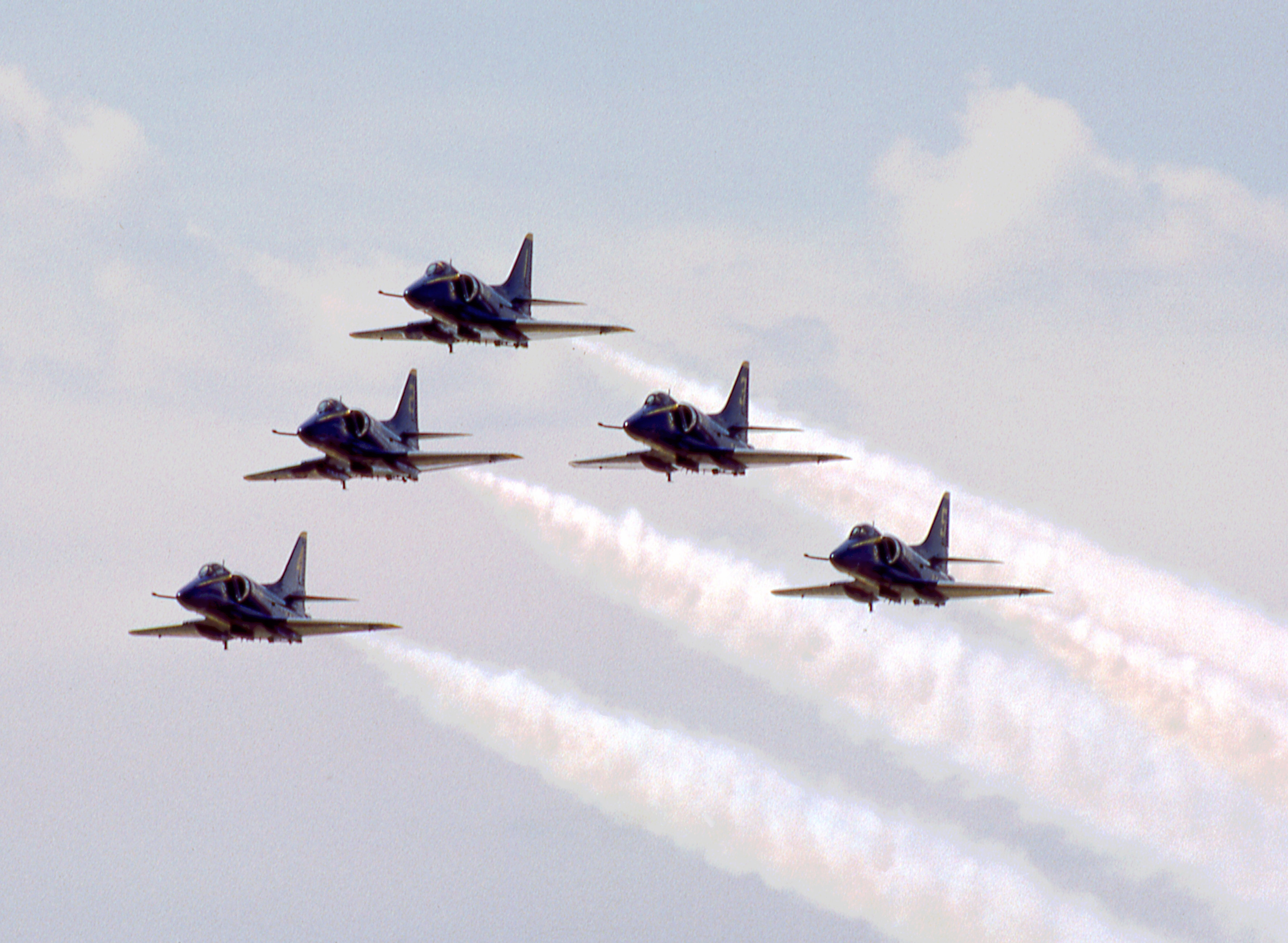
Blue Angels team equipped with A-4 Skyhawk, Chino Airport, San Bernardino County, California, 1985

Accidents and the price of fuel and maintenance costs led to the adoption of the more economical Douglas A-4 Skyhawk II. The Blue Angels flew the A-4 in their 80 shows during the bicentennial celebrations of 1976. The Blue Angels also made 30 years on 1976 and performed their 2,000th show flying the A-4F. The Skyhawk served from December 1974 to November 1986.

==== F/A-18 Hornet ====
In 1986, the Blue Angels transitioned to the F/A-18 Hornet. The F/A-18A model served from 1986 to 2010, and the F/A-18C model served from 2010 to 2020.

==== F/A-18 Super Hornet ====
In 2020, The Blue Angels switched to the Boeing F/A-18 Super Hornet, flying the F/A-18E model for the demonstration and F/A-18F for Blue Angel #7 jet and for the #4 Slot Pilot for practice routines.

== Demonstration Pilots ==
The 2026 USN Blue Angels demonstration pilots and flight officers are:

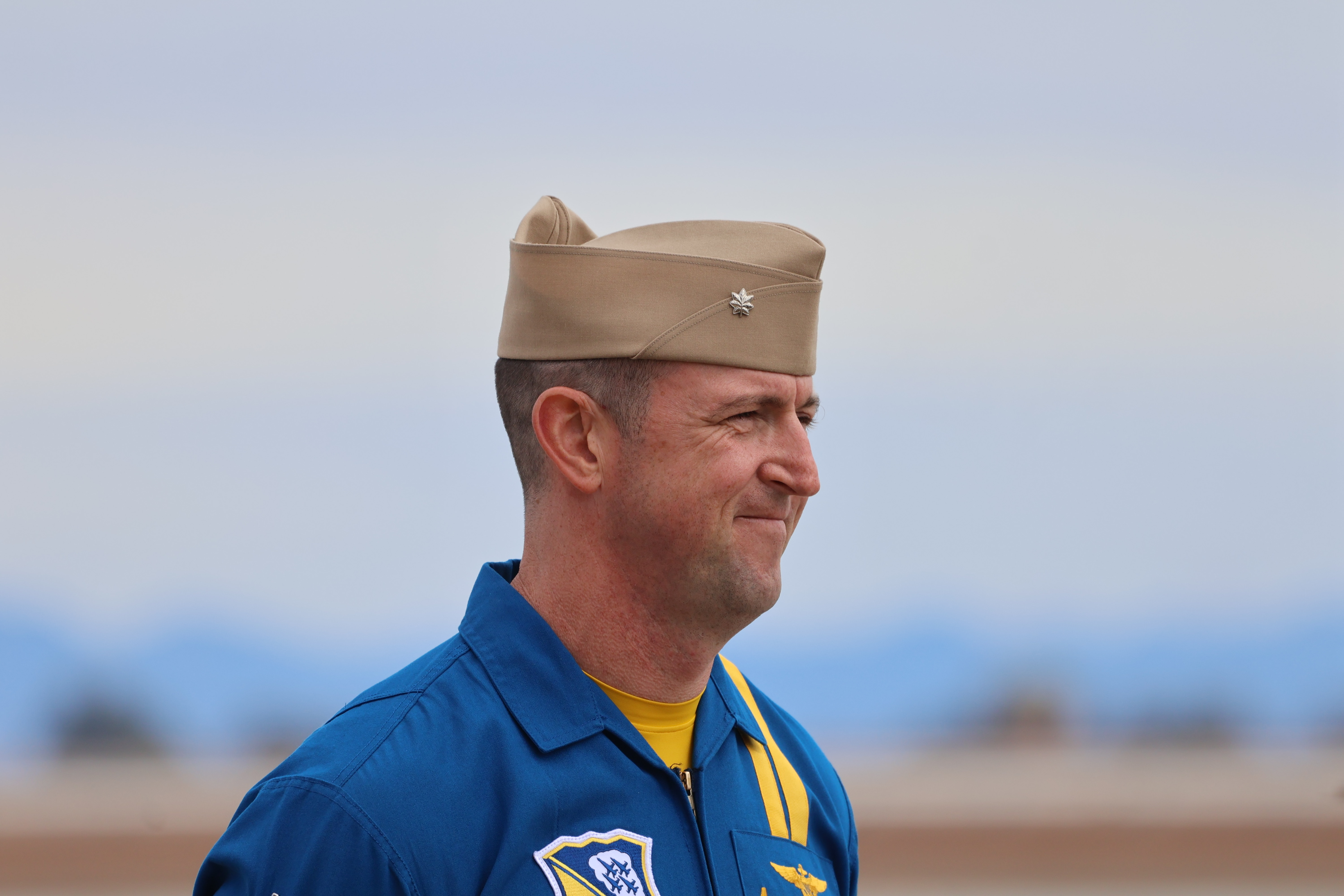
Captain Adam Bryan during the Blue Angels' first media day of the 2025 season at NAF El Centro - Thomas Berry/760 News Media

- CAPT Adam "Gilligan" Bryan: Flight Leader/Commanding Officer
- LT Cam "Starlazer / Hatfish" Schneider: Right Wing
- LT Chris "SadClam" Houben: Left Wing
- LTCOL Brandon "Wobbly" Wilkins: Slot
- LCDR Connor "Buddy" O'Donnell: Lead Solo
- Placeholder: Opposing Solo
- LCDR Ronny "Downy" Hafeza: Narrator
- CDR Lilly "Lunchbox" Montana: Events Coordinator

As of the 2026 season, 299 demonstration pilots (including for the C-130) have served in the Blue Angels.

The team is divided into three departments: Officers, Enlisted, and Technical Representatives. Team members come from the ranks of regular USN and USMC units. Pilots and narrator are made up of USN and USMC naval aviators. Pilots serve two to three years. Position assignments are made according to team needs, pilot experience levels, and career considerations for members. Other officers include a naval flight officer, who serves as the event coordinator, three USMC C-130 pilots, an executive officer, a maintenance officer, a flight surgeon, a supply officer, a public affairs officer, and an administrative officer in the Technical Representatives Department. Enlisted members range in rank from E-4 to E-9 and perform all maintenance, administrative, and support functions. They serve three to four years. After serving with the squadron, members return to fleet assignments.

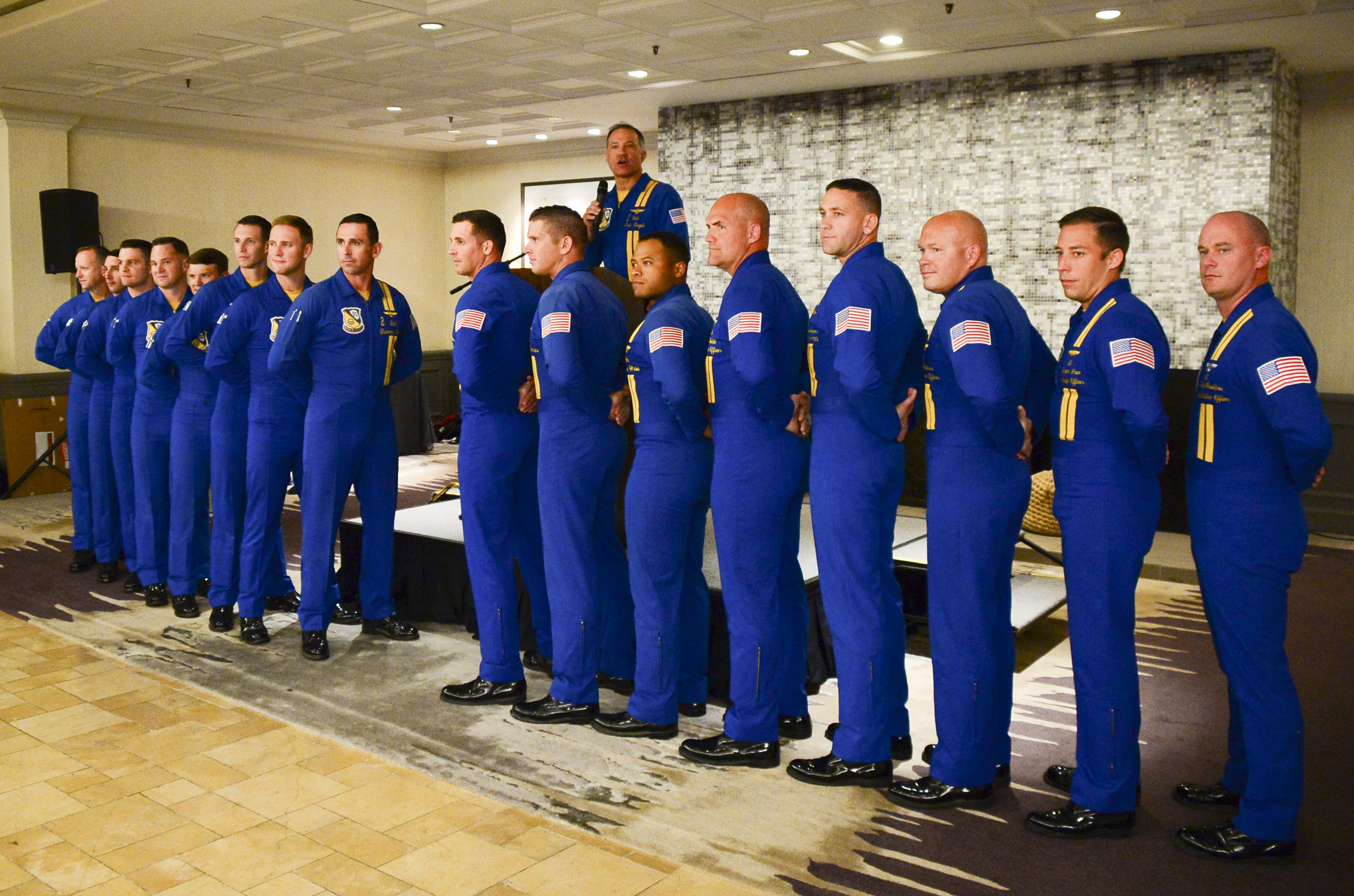
Navy's Blue Angels in the San Francisco Bay area

The officer-selection process requires candidates wishing to become Blue Angels to apply formally via their chain of command, with a personal statement, letters of recommendation, and flight records. USN and USMC F/A-18 demonstration pilots and naval flight officers are required to have a minimum of 1,250 tactical jet hours and be carrier qualified. USMC C-130 demonstration pilots are required to have 1,200 flight hours and be an aircraft commander.

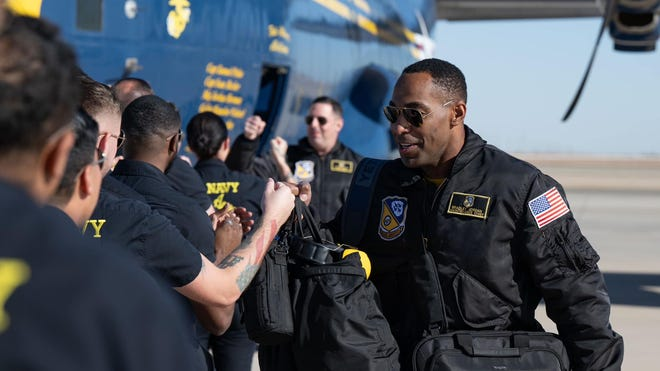
Blue Angels arrived at Naval Air Facility El Centro for their three-month winter training

Applicants "rush" the team at one or more airshows, paid with their own finances, and sit in on team briefs, postshow activities, and social events. New officers must fit the Blue Angels culture and team dynamics. The evaluation process runs from March through early July, culminating with finalist interviews and team deliberations. Team members vote in secret on the next year's officers. Selections must be unanimous.

The Flight Leader (No. 1) is the commanding officer and holds the rank of commander, who may be promoted to captain midtour if approved by the selection board.

Pilots numbered 2–7 are USN lieutenant commanders or lieutenants or USMC majors or captains. The (#7) pilot narrates for a year, and then typically flies opposing solo (#6) and then lead solo (#5) the following two years, respectively. The (#3) pilot moves to the (#4) "Slot" position for the second year. Blue Angel (#4) serves as the demonstration safety officer, due largely to the perspective afforded from the slot position within the formation, as well as status as a second-year demonstration pilot. The (#8) pilot, usually a naval flight officer, serves as events coordinator for two years. This job is to communicate, manage VIP/media rides, and make sure each event and airshow is successful.

Since 2008, seven female flight officers have been selected. LCDR Amanda Lee became the first woman to be named as a F/A-18 demonstration pilot. She served from 2022 to 2024. CDR Lilly Montana is events coordinator for the 2025-26 season. CAPT Olivia Bair, USMC, is serving as a C-130 pilot for the 2026 season. CDR Amy Tomlinson, MAJ Corrie Mays USMC, and LCDR Katlin Forster served as events coordinators. LTCOL Katie Higgins Cook, USMC, served as a C-130 pilot.

Several minority flight officers served, including CAPT Donnie Cochran, the first African American to command the Blue Angels. LT Andre Webb and LCDR Julius Bratton served as demonstration pilots.

One USN pilot serves two years as maintenance officer (MO), the first year as the assistant maintenance officer (role removed recently) and second year as MO.

As of 2025, one USN aviator serves two years as the MO. The MO is in charge of the men, women, and equipment that keep the aircraft flying. This job is to maintain, observe, and update the wind data, visibility, and clouds.

Flight surgeons serve a two-year term and provide medical services, evaluates demonstration maneuvers from the ground, and participates in postflight debriefs. The first female Blue Angel flight surgeon was LT Tamara Schnurr, who was a member of the 2001 team.

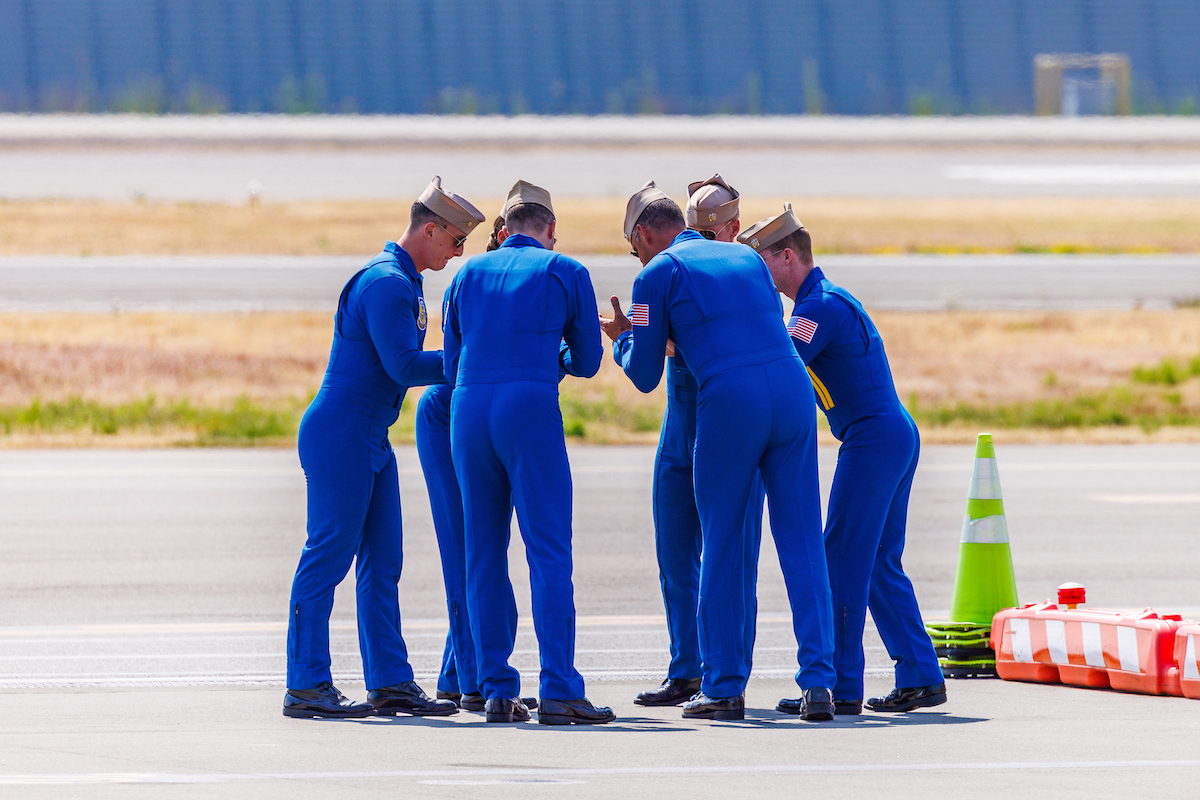
Blue Angels at Seafair (2025) preparing for their Walkdown Ground Show

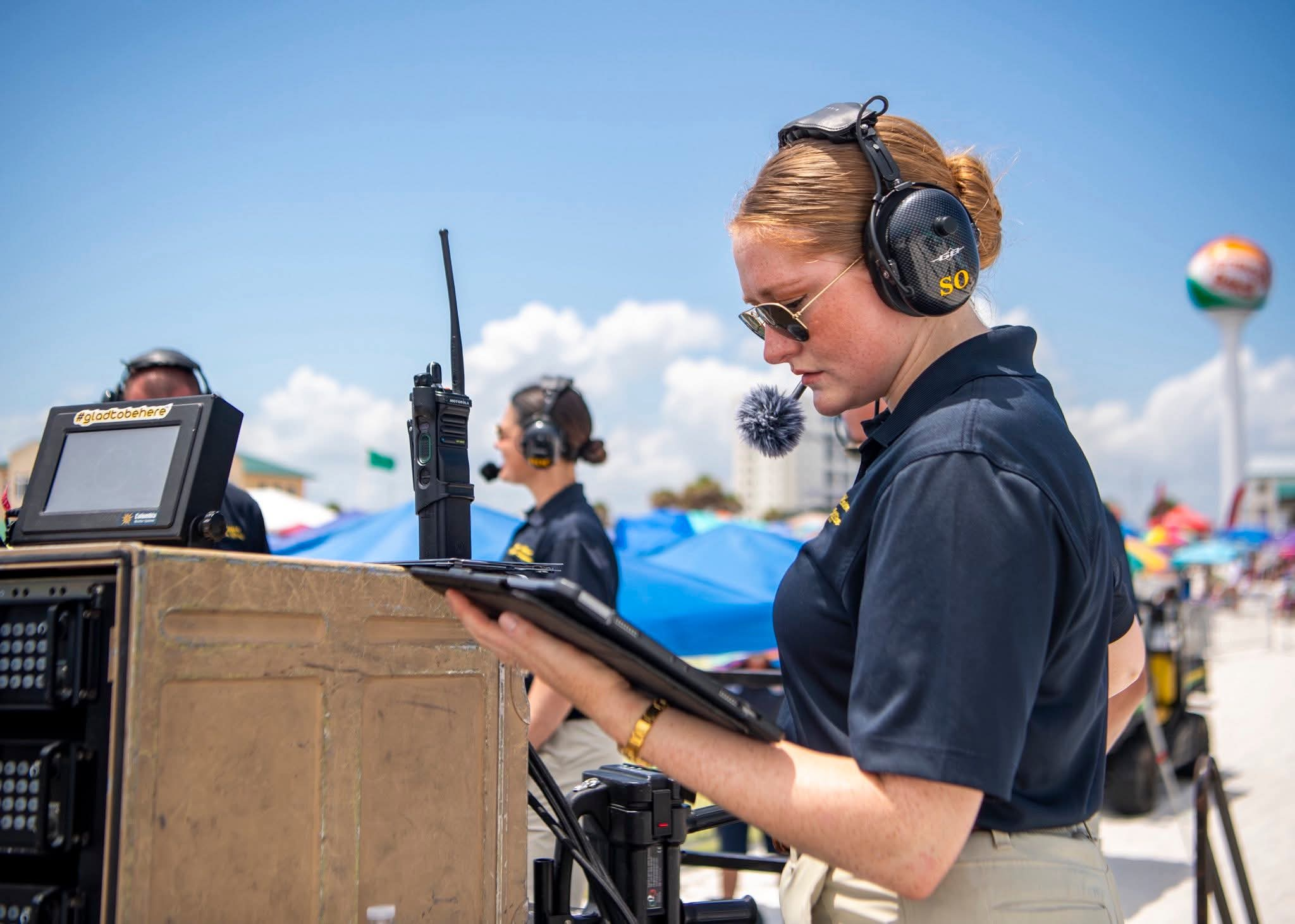
LT Mara Mason, the 2025 Blue Angels supply officer, at the Pensacola Beach Show

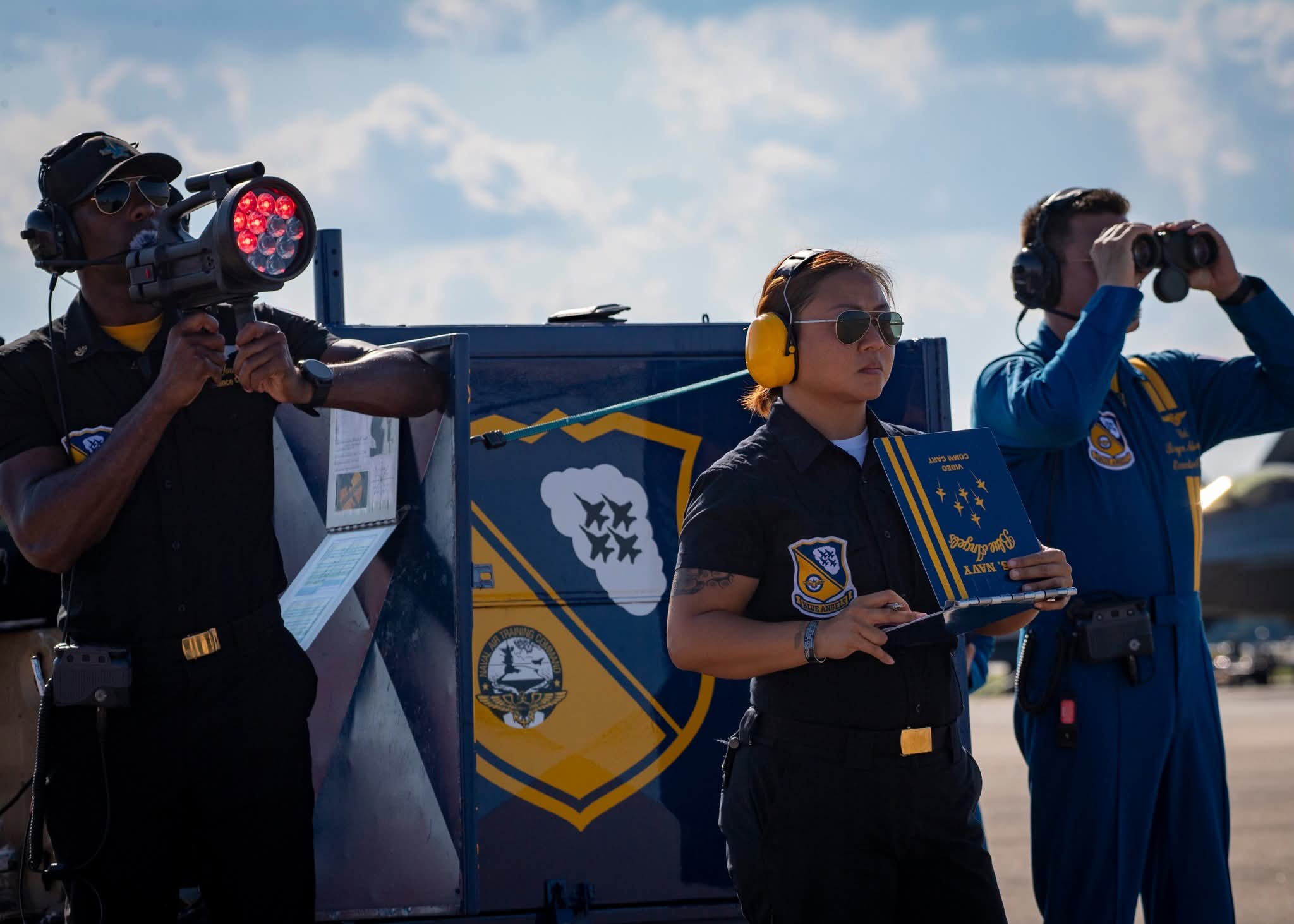
At the 2025 NAS Oceana Show

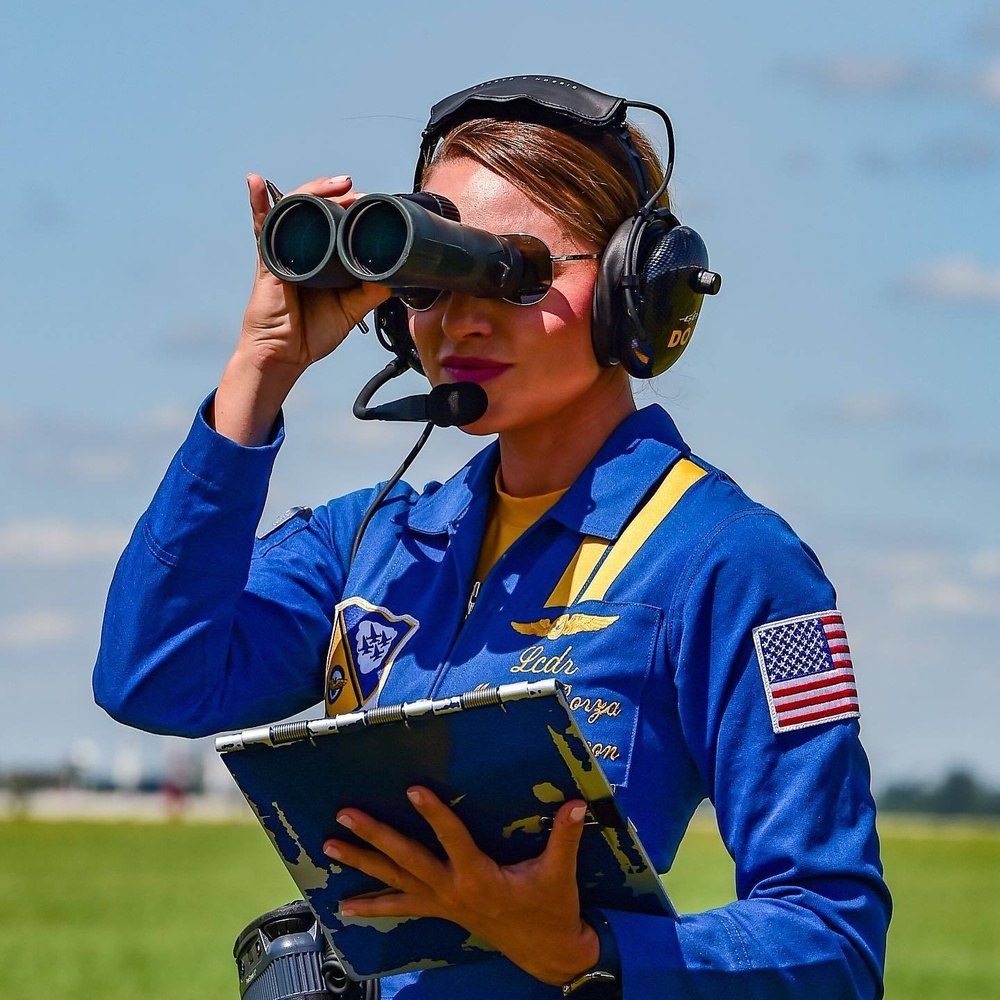
LCDR Monica Borza (2025 flight surgeon) observing the flight demonstration for safety purposes

== Training and weekly routine ==
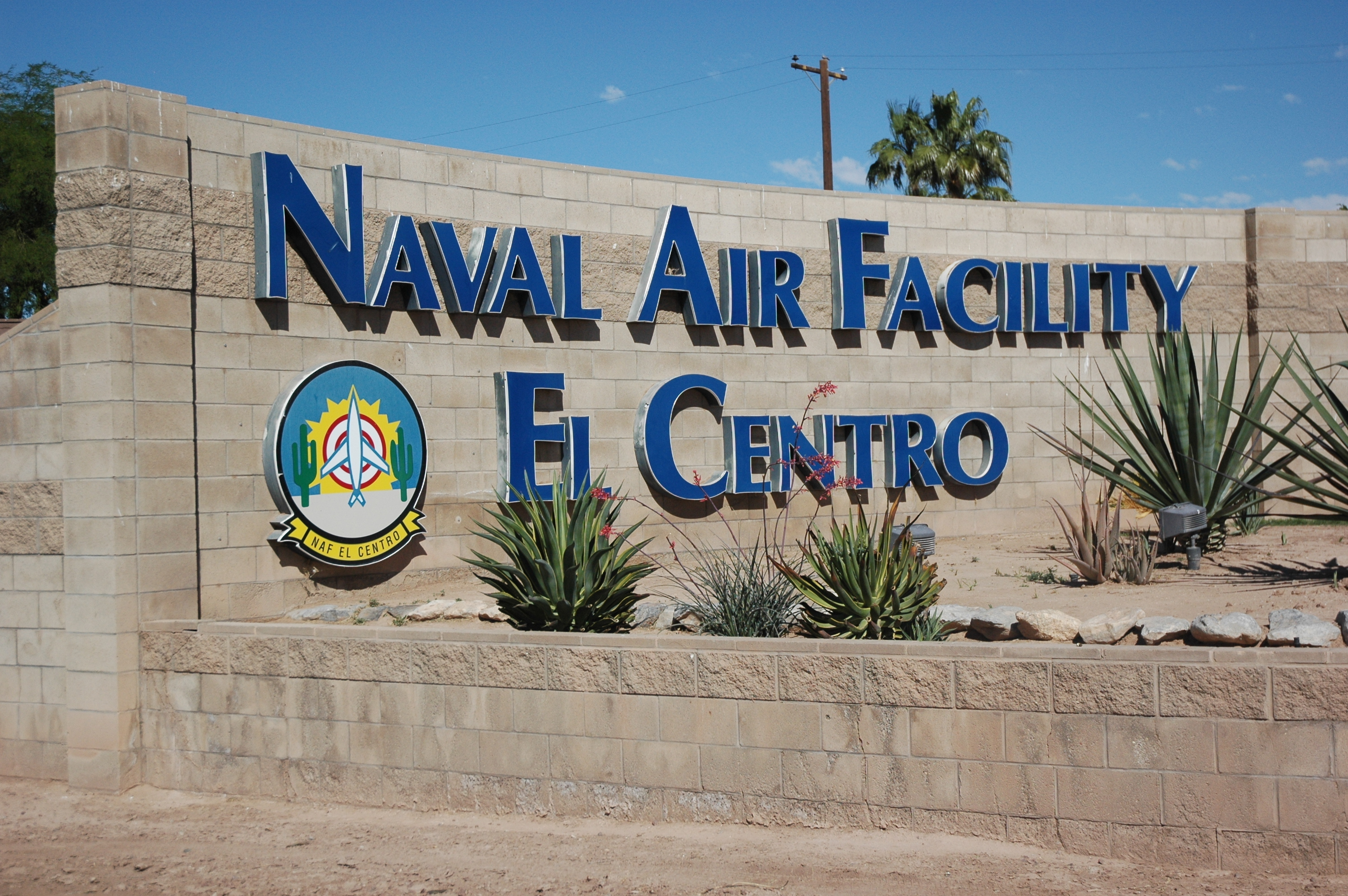
US Naval Air Facility El Centro entrance sign (2016)

Annual winter training takes place at NAF El Centro, California, where new and returning pilots hone skills. Pilots fly two practice sessions per day, six days a week, to handle the 120 training missions needed to perform the routines. The separation between the formations and their maneuver altitude is gradually reduced over two months in January and February. After their first show on Naval Air Facility El Centro, the team then returns to their homebase in Pensacola, Florida, and continues to practice throughout the show season.

A typical week during the season has practices at NAS Pensacola on Tuesday and Wednesday mornings. The team then flies to its show venue for the upcoming weekend on Thursday, conducting "circle and arrival" orientation maneuvers upon arrival. The team flies a practice airshow at the site on Friday. This show is attended by invited guests, but is often open to the general public. Airshows are conducted on Saturdays and Sundays, with the team returning home to NAS Pensacola on Sunday evenings. Monday is an off day. Aircraft maintenance is performed on Sunday evening and Monday. The season concludes with a homecoming show at NAS Pensacola.

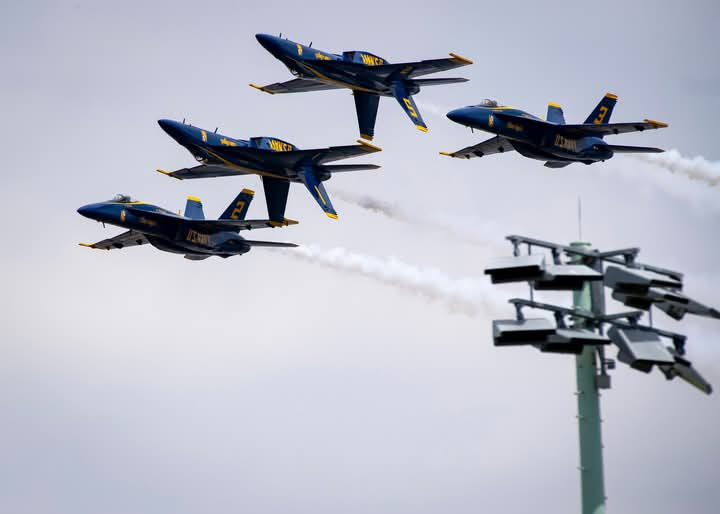
Blue Angels Double Farvel

Pilots maneuver the flight stick with their right hand holding the stick with their knuckles facing the aircraft's display panels and operate the throttle with their left hand. Both hands wear gloves to avoid sweaty hands. They do not wear G-suits because the air bladders inside repeatedly deflate and inflate, increasing the risk of unintentional movement. To compensate for the lack of G-suits, pilots have developed a method for tensing their muscles to prevent blood from pooling in their lower extremities, possibly rendering them unconscious.

== History ==
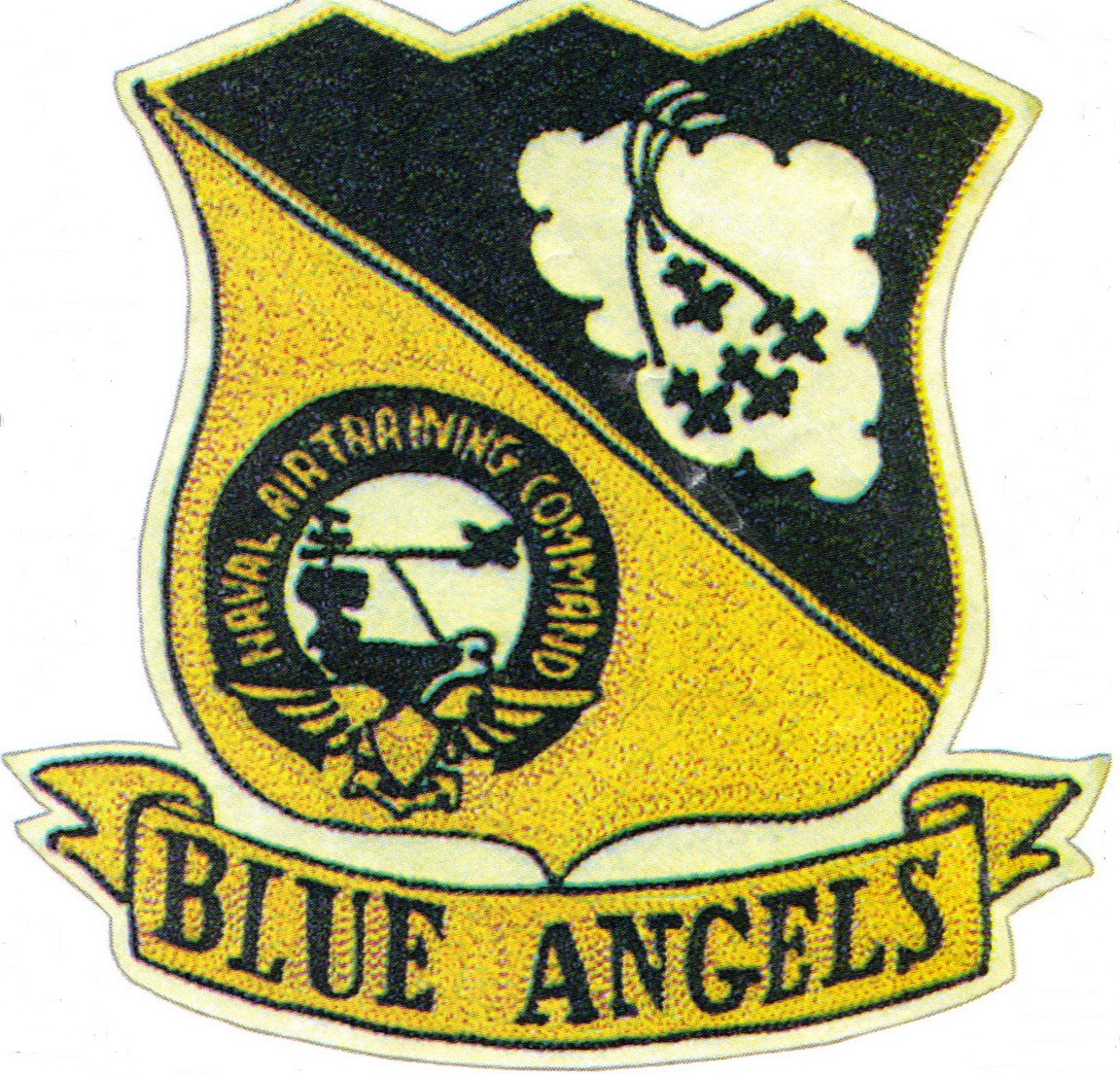
Original team insignia

The Blue Angels formed in April 1946 as the Navy Flight Exhibition Team. They changed their name to the Blue Angels after seeing an advertisement for the New York nightclub The Blue Angel, also known as The Blue Angel Supper Club, in the New Yorker Magazine. The team was introduced as the Blue Angels during an air show in July 1946.

The first demonstration aircraft wore navy blue (nearly black) with gold lettering. The current shades of blue and yellow were adopted when the first demonstration aircraft were transitioned from the F6F-5 Hellcats to Bearcats in August 1946; the aircraft wore an all-yellow scheme with blue markings during the 1949 show season.

The original Blue Angels insignia or crest was designed in 1949, by LCDR Raleigh "Dusty" Rhodes, their third flight leader and first jet fighter leader. The aircraft silhouettes change as the team changes aircraft.

The Blue Angels transitioned from propeller-driven aircraft to F9F-2B Panthers (in blue and gold) in August 1949.

The Blue Angels demonstration teams began wearing leather jackets and colored flight suits with the Blue Angels insignia, in 1952. In 1953, they began wearing gold-colored flight suits for the first show of the season and to commemorate milestones.

The Navy Flight Exhibition Team was reorganized and commissioned the United States Navy Flight Demonstration Squadron on 10 December 1973.

=== 1946–1949 ===
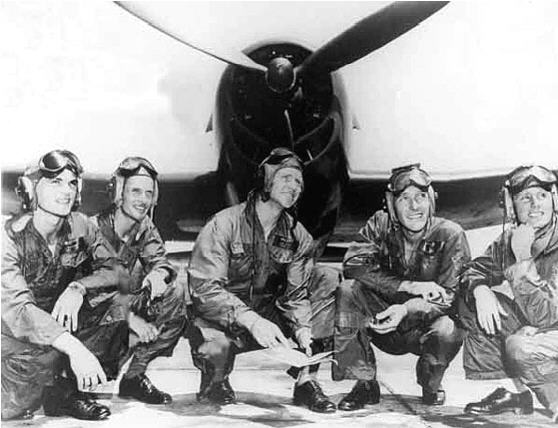
The first Navy "Blue Angels" Flight Demonstration Squadron (1946–1947), assembled in front of one of their Grumman F6F Hellcats (l to r): LT Al Taddeo, Solo; LT (J.G.) Gale Stouse, Spare; LCDR R.M. "Butch" Voris, flight leader; LT Maurice "Wick" Wickendoll, right wing; LT Mel Cassidy, left wing

The Blue Angels were established as a Navy flight exhibition team on 24 April 1946 by order of Chief of Naval Operations Admiral Chester Nimitz to generate greater public support of naval aviation. To boost Navy morale, demonstrate naval air power, and maintain public interest in naval aviation, an underlying mission was to help the Navy generate public and political support for a larger allocation of the shrinking defense budget. Rear Admiral Ralph Davison personally selected Lieutenant Commander Roy Marlin "Butch" Voris, a World War II fighter ace, to assemble and train a flight demonstration team, naming him Officer-in-Charge and Flight Leader. Voris selected three fellow instructors to join him (Lt. Maurice "Wick" Wickendoll, Lt. Mel Cassidy, and Lt. Cmdr. Lloyd Barnard, veterans of the War in the Pacific). The group perfected its initial maneuvers in secret over the Florida Everglades so that, in Voris' words, "if anything happened, just the alligators would know". The first four pilots and those after them were some of the best and most experienced Navy aviators.

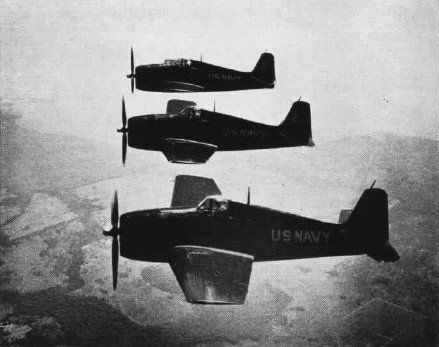
Grumman F6F-5 Hellcats, 1946

The team's first demonstration with Grumman F6F-5 Hellcat aircraft took place before Navy officials on 10 May 1946 and was met with enthusiastic approval. The Angels performed their first air show at what is now JaxEx (formerly Craig Municipal Airport, one of 6 airports in the Jacksonville, FL area developed for military training), on 15 June 1946. The exhibition team flew three Gruman F6F Hellcat Fighter planes (a fourth F6F-5 was held in reserve). On 15 June, Voris led the three Hellcats (numbered 1–3), specially modified to reduce weight and painted sea blue with gold leaf trim, through their inaugural 15-minute-long performance. The team employed a North American SNJ Texan, painted and configured to simulate a Japanese Zero, to simulate aerial combat. This aircraft was later painted yellow and dubbed the "Beetle Bomb". This aircraft is said to have been inspired by one of the Spike Jones' Murdering the Classics series of musical satires, set to the tune (in part) of the William Tell Overture as a thoroughbred horse race scene, with "Beetle Bomb" being the "trailing horse" in the lyrics.

The team thrilled spectators with low-flying maneuvers performed in tight formations, and (according to Voris) by "keeping something in front of the crowds at all times. My objective was to beat the Army Air Corps. If we did that, we'd get all the other side issues. I felt that if we weren't the best, it would be my naval career." The Blue Angels' first public demonstration netted the team its first trophy, which sits on display at the team's current home at NAS Pensacola. During an air show at Omaha, Nebraska on 19–21 July 1946, the Navy Flight Exhibition Team was introduced as the Blue Angels. The name had originated through a suggestion by Right Wing Pilot Lt. Maurice "Wick" Wickendoll, after he had read about the Blue Angel nightclub in The New Yorker magazine. After ten appearances with the Hellcats, the Hellcats were replaced by the lighter, faster, and more powerful F8F-1 Bearcats on 25 August. By the end of the year the team consisted of four Bearcats numbered 1–4 on the tail sections.

In May 1947, flight leader Lt. Cmdr. Bob Clarke replaced Butch Voris as the team leader. The team with an additional fifth pilot, relocated to Naval Air Station (NAS) Corpus Christi, Texas. On 7 June at Birmingham, Alabama, four F8F-1 Bearcats (numbered 1–4) flew in diamond formation for the first time which is now considered the Blue Angels' trademark. A fifth Bearcat was also added that year. A SNJ was used as a Japanese Zero for dogfights with the Bearcats in air shows.

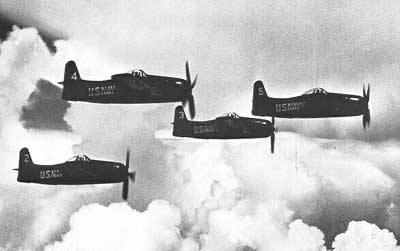
Grumman F8F Bearcats in "diamond" formation, 1947

In January 1948, Lt. Cmdr. Raleigh "Dusty" Rhodes took command of the Blue Angels team, which was flying four Bearcats and a yellow painted SNJ with USN markings dubbed "Beetle Bomb"; the SNJ represented a Japanese Zero for the air show dogfights with the Bearcats. The name "Blue Angels" also was painted on the Bearcats.

In 1949, the team acquired a Douglas R4D Skytrain for logistics to and from show sites. The team's SNJ was replaced by another Bearcat, painted yellow for the air combat routine, inheriting the "Beetle Bomb" nickname. In May, the team went to the west coast on temporary duty so the pilots and the rest of the team could become familiar with jet aircraft. On 13 July, the team acquired, and began flying the straight-wing Grumman F9F-2B Panther between demonstration shows. On 20 August, the team debuted the panther jets under Team Leader Lt. Commander Raleigh "Dusty" Rhodes during an air show at Beaumont, Texas and added a sixth pilot. The F8F-1 "Beetle Bomb" was relegated to solo aerobatics before the main show, until it crashed on takeoff at a training show in Pensacola on 24 April 1950, killing pilot Lt. Robert Longworth. Team headquarters shifted from NAS Corpus Christi, Texas, to NAAS Whiting Field, Florida, on 10 September 1949.

=== 1950–1959 ===
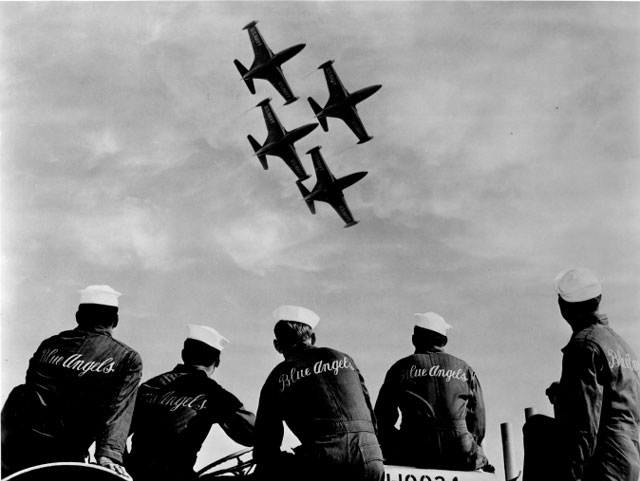
Support crew watches their team flying Grumman F9F-2 Panther jet fighters, 1952

The Blue Angels pilots continued to perform nationwide in the 1950s. On 25 June 1950, the Korean War started, and all Blue Angels pilots volunteered for combat duty. The squadron (due to a shortage of pilots, and no available planes) and its members were ordered to "combat-ready status" after an exhibition at Naval Air Station, Dallas, Texas on 30 July. The Blue Angels were disbanded, and its pilots were reassigned to the aircraft carrier USS Princeton on 9 November. The group formed the core of Fighter Squadron 191 (VF-19), "Satan's Kittens", under the command of World War II fighter ace and 1950 Blue Angels Commander/Flight Leader, Lt. Commander John Magda; he was killed in action on 8 March 1951.

On 25 October 1951, the Blues were ordered to re-activate as a flight demonstration team, and reported to NAS Corpus Christi, Texas. Lt. Cdr. Voris was again tasked with assembling the team (he was the first of two commanding officers to lead them twice). In May 1952, the Blue Angels began performing again with F9F-5 Panthers at an airshow in Memphis, Tennessee. In 1953, the team traded its Sky Train for a Curtiss R5C Commando. In August, "Blues" leader LCDR Ray Hawkins became the first naval aviator to survive an ejection at supersonic speeds when a new F9F-6 he was piloting became uncontrollable on a cross-country flight. After summer, the team began demonstrating with F9F-6 Cougars.

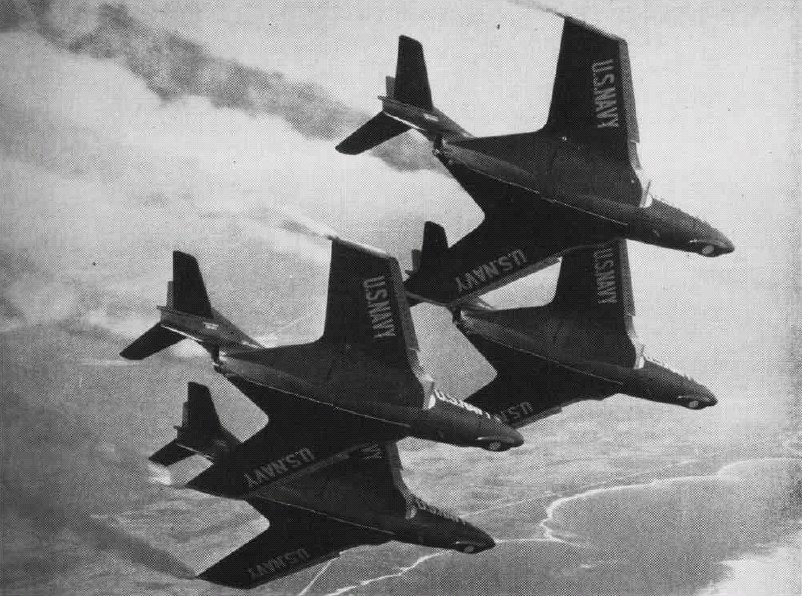
Grumman F9F-8 Cougar formation in 1956

In 1954, the first Marine Corps pilot, Captain Chuck Hiett, joined the team. The Blue Angels received special colored flight suits. In May, the Blue Angels performed at Bolling Air Force Base in Washington, D.C., with the Air Force Thunderbirds (activated 25 May 1953). The Blue Angels began relocating to their ultimate home at Naval Air Station (NAS) Pensacola, Florida that winter, and it was there they progressed to the swept-wing Grumman F9F-8 Cougar. In December, the team left its home base for its first winter training facility at Naval Air Facility El Centro, California

In September 1956, the team added a sixth aircraft to the flight demonstration in the Opposing Solo position, and gave its first performance outside the United States at the International Air Exposition in Toronto, Ontario, Canada. It upgraded its logistics aircraft to the Douglas R5D Skymaster.

In 1957, the Blue Angels transitioned from the F9F-8 Cougar to the supersonic Grumman F11F-1 Tiger. The first demonstration was flying the short-nosed version on 23 March, at Barin Field, Pensacola, and then the long-nosed versions. The demonstration team (with added Angel 6) wore gold flight suits during the first air show that season.

In 1958, the first Six-Plane Delta Maneuvers were added that season.

=== 1960–1969 ===
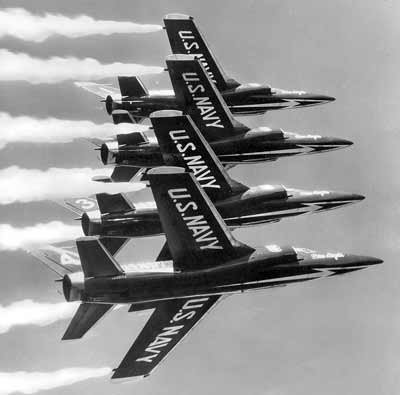
Grumman F11F-1 Tiger, 1957–69

In July 1964, the Blue Angels participated in the Aeronaves de Mexico Anniversary Air Show over Mexico City, Mexico, before an estimated crowd of 1.5 million people.

In 1965, the Blue Angels conducted a Caribbean island tour, flying at five sites. Later that year, they embarked on a European tour to a dozen sites, including the Paris Air Show, where they were the only team to receive a standing ovation.

In 1967, the Blues toured Europe again, visiting six sites.

In 1968, the C-54 Skymaster transport aircraft was replaced with a Lockheed VC-121J Constellation. The Blues transitioned to the two-seat McDonnell Douglas F-4J Phantom II in 1969, nearly always leaving the back seat empty for flight demonstrations. The Phantom was the only plane to be flown by both the "Blues" and the United States Air Force Thunderbirds (the "Birds"). That year they also upgraded to the Lockheed C-121 Super Constellation for logistics.

=== 1970–1979 ===
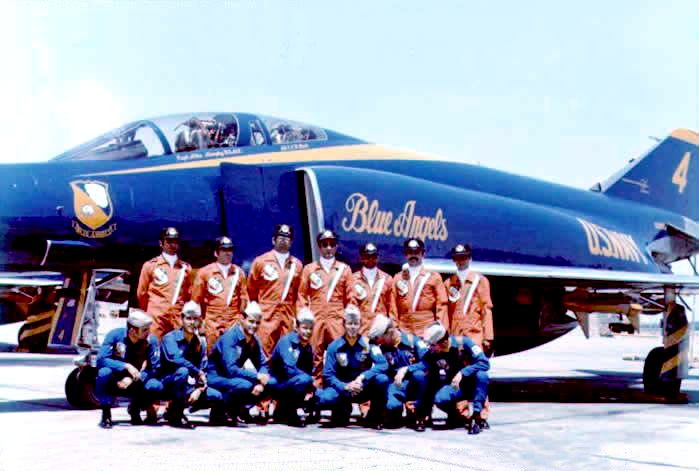
Members from the Imperial Iranian Air Force Golden Crown and the Blue Angels during the joint airshow; Kushke Nosrat Airbase, 1973

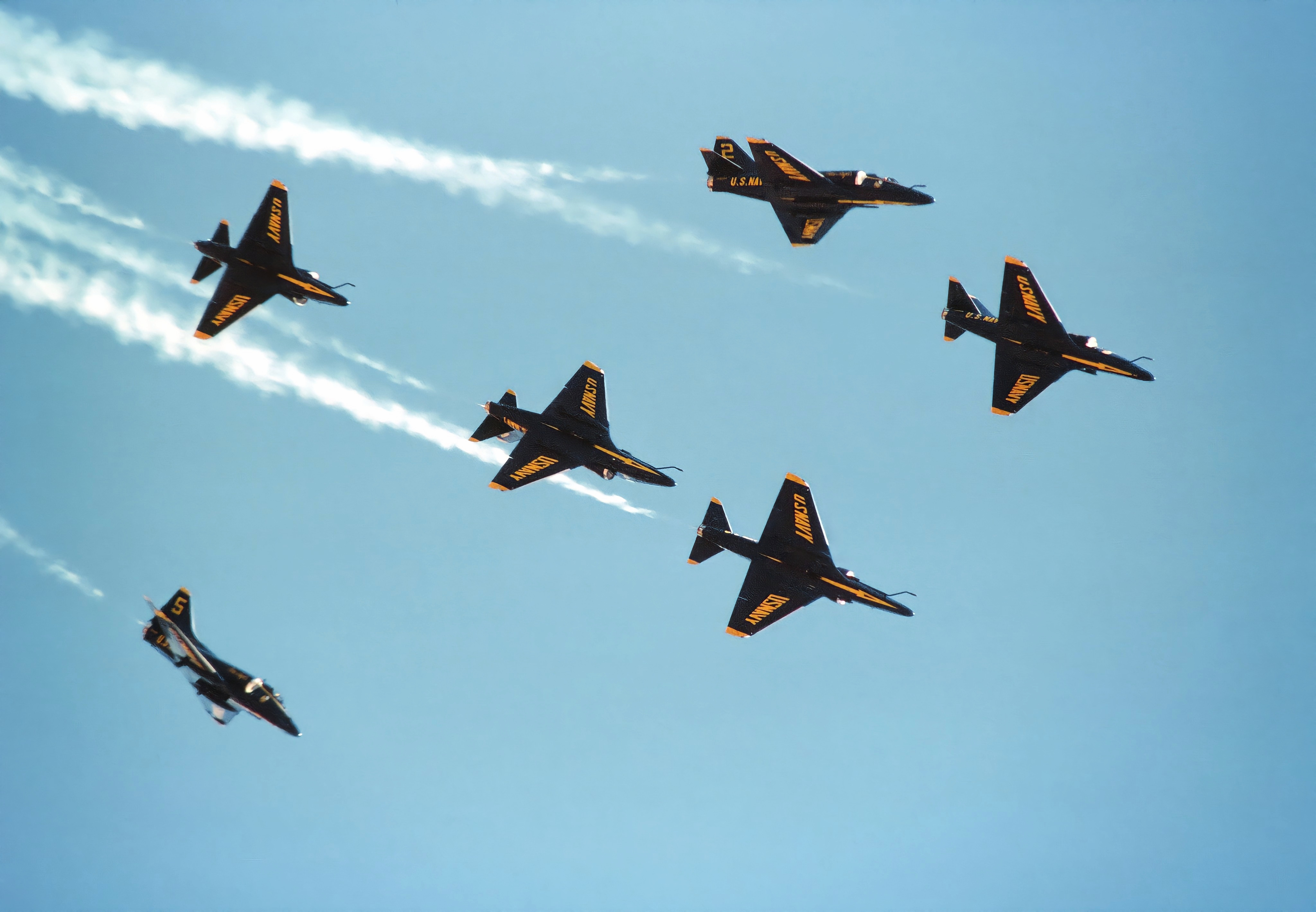
All six Blue Angels Douglas A-4F Skyhawks executing a "fleur de lis" maneuver

In 1970, the Blues received their first U.S. Marine Corps Lockheed KC-130F Hercules, manned by an all-Marine crew. That year, they went on their first South American tour.

In 1971, the team, which wore gold flight suits for the first show, conducted its first Far East Tour, performing at a dozen locations in Korea, Japan, Taiwan, Guam, and the Philippines.

In 1972, the Blue Angels were awarded the Navy's Meritorious Unit Commendation for the two-year period from 1 March 1970 to 31 December 1971. Another European tour followed in 1973, including air shows in Iran, England, France, Spain, Turkey, Greece, and Italy.

On 10 December 1973, the Navy Flight Exhibition Team was reorganized and commissioned the United States Navy Flight Demonstration Squadron. The Blues mission focused more on Navy recruiting.

In 1974, the Blue Angels transitioned to the Douglas A-4F Skyhawk II. Navy Commander Anthony Less became the squadron's first "commanding officer" and "flight leader". A permanent flight surgeon position and administration officer was added to the team. The squadron's mission was redefined by Less to further improve the recruiting effort.

Beginning in 1975, "Bert" was used for Jet Assisted Take Off (JATO) and short aerial demonstrations just prior to the main event at selected venues, but the JATO demonstration ended in 2009 due to dwindling supplies of rockets. "Fat Albert Airlines" flew with an all-Marine crew of three officers and five enlisted personnel.

=== 1980–1989 ===
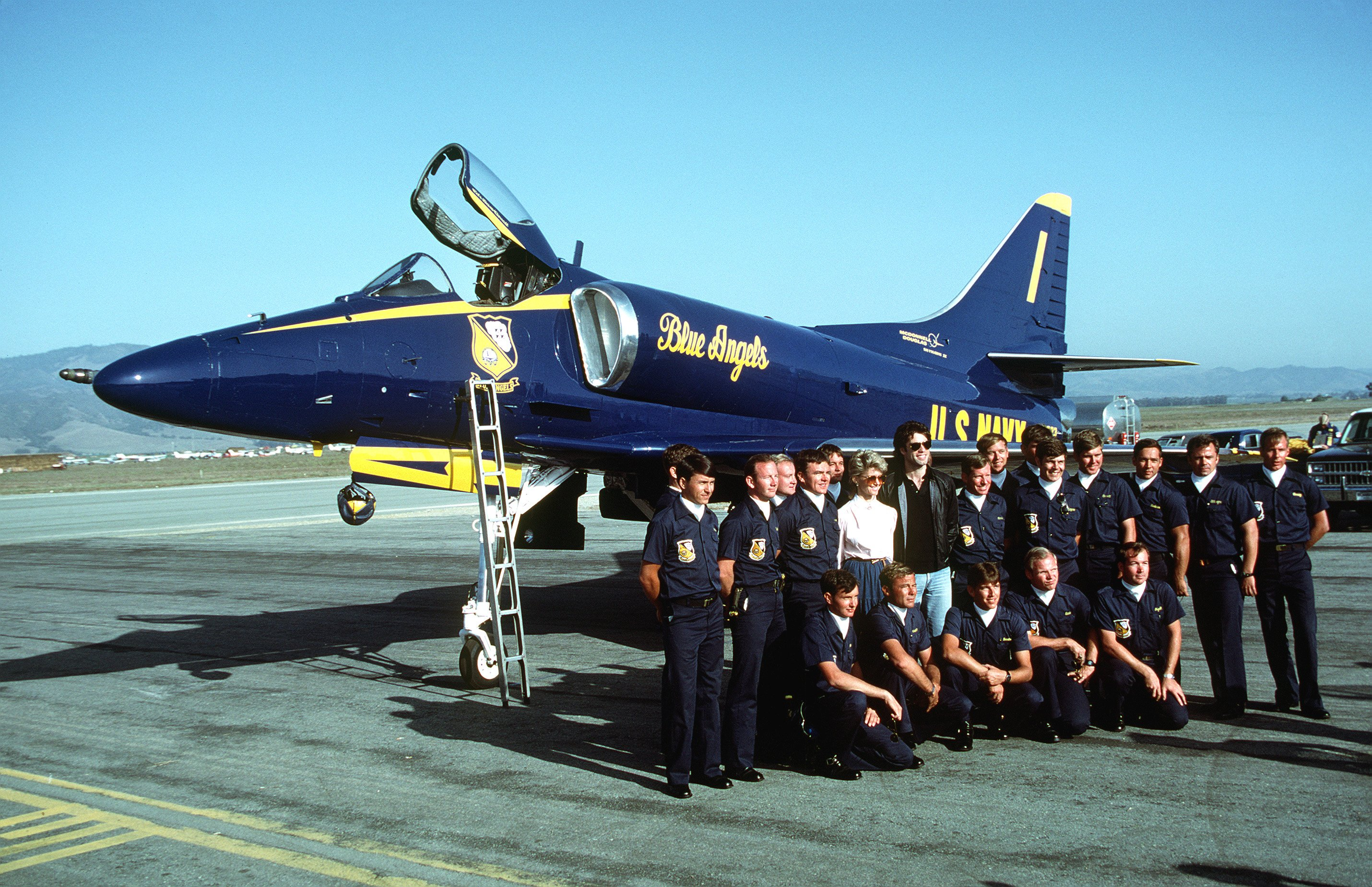
A-4F of Blue Angels in 1983 (with John Travolta and Olivia Newton-John)

In 1986, LCDR Donnie Cochran joined the Blue Angels as the first African-American Naval Aviator to be selected. He served for two more years with the squadron, flying the left wing-man position in the No. 3 A-4F fighter, and returned to command the Blue Angels in 1995 and 1996.

On 8 November 1986, the Blue Angels completed their 40th anniversary year during ceremonies unveiling what would remain their aircraft through their 75th anniversary year, the McDonnell Douglas F/A-18 Hornet. The power and aerodynamics of the Hornet allowed them to perform a slow, high angle of attack "tail sitting" maneuver, and to fly a "dirty" (landing gear down) formation loop.

=== 1990–1999 ===
Today is a very special and memorable day in your military career that will remain with you throughout your lifetime. You have survived the ultimate test of your peers and have proven to be completely deserving to wear the crest of the U.S. Navy Blue Angels. The prestige of wearing the Blue Angels uniform carries with it an extraordinary honor – one that reflects not only on you as an individual, but on your teammates and the entire squadron. To the crowds at the air shows and to the public at hospitals and schools nationwide, you are a symbol of the Navy and Marine Corps' finest. You bring pride, hope and a promise for tomorrow's Navy and Marine Corps in the smiles and handshakes of today's youth. Remember today as the day you became a Blue Angel; look around at your teammates and commit this special bond to memory. "Once a Blue Angel, always a Blue Angel," rings true for all those who wear the crest of the U.S. Navy Blue Angels. Welcome to the team.

— The Blue Angels Creed, written by JO1 Cathy Konn 1991–1993

In 1992, the Blue Angels deployed for a month-long European tour, their first in 19 years, conducting shows in Sweden, Finland, Russia (first foreign flight demonstration team to perform there), Romania, Bulgaria, Italy, the United Kingdom, and Spain.

In November 1998, CDR Patrick Driscoll made the first "Blue Jet" landing on a "haze gray and underway" aircraft carrier, USS Harry S. Truman (CVN-75).

On 8 October 1999, the Blue Angels lost two pilots. LCDR Kieron O'Connor and LT Kevin Colling were returning from a practice flight before an air show when their F/A-18B crashed in a wooded area of south Georgia.

=== 2000–2009 ===
Pilots were not required to wear and did not wear g-suits.

In 2008 one pilot and another officer were removed from duty for engaging in an "inappropriate relationship". At the next performance at Lackland Air Force Base following the announcement the No. 4 or slot pilot, was absent from the formation. On 6 November 2008, both officers were found guilty at an admiral's mast on unspecified charges but the resulting punishment was not disclosed.

On 21 April 2007, pilot Kevin "Kojak" Davis was killed and eight people on the ground were injured when Davis lost control of the No. 6 jet and crashed during an air show at the Marine Corps Air Station Beaufort in Beaufort, South Carolina.

The Fat Albert performed its final JATO demonstration at the 2009 Pensacola Homecoming show, expending their eight remaining JATO bottles. This demonstration not only was the last JATO performance of the squadron, but also the final JATO use by the Marines.

In 2009, the Blue Angels were inducted into the International Air & Space Hall of Fame at the San Diego Air & Space Museum.

=== 2010–2019 ===
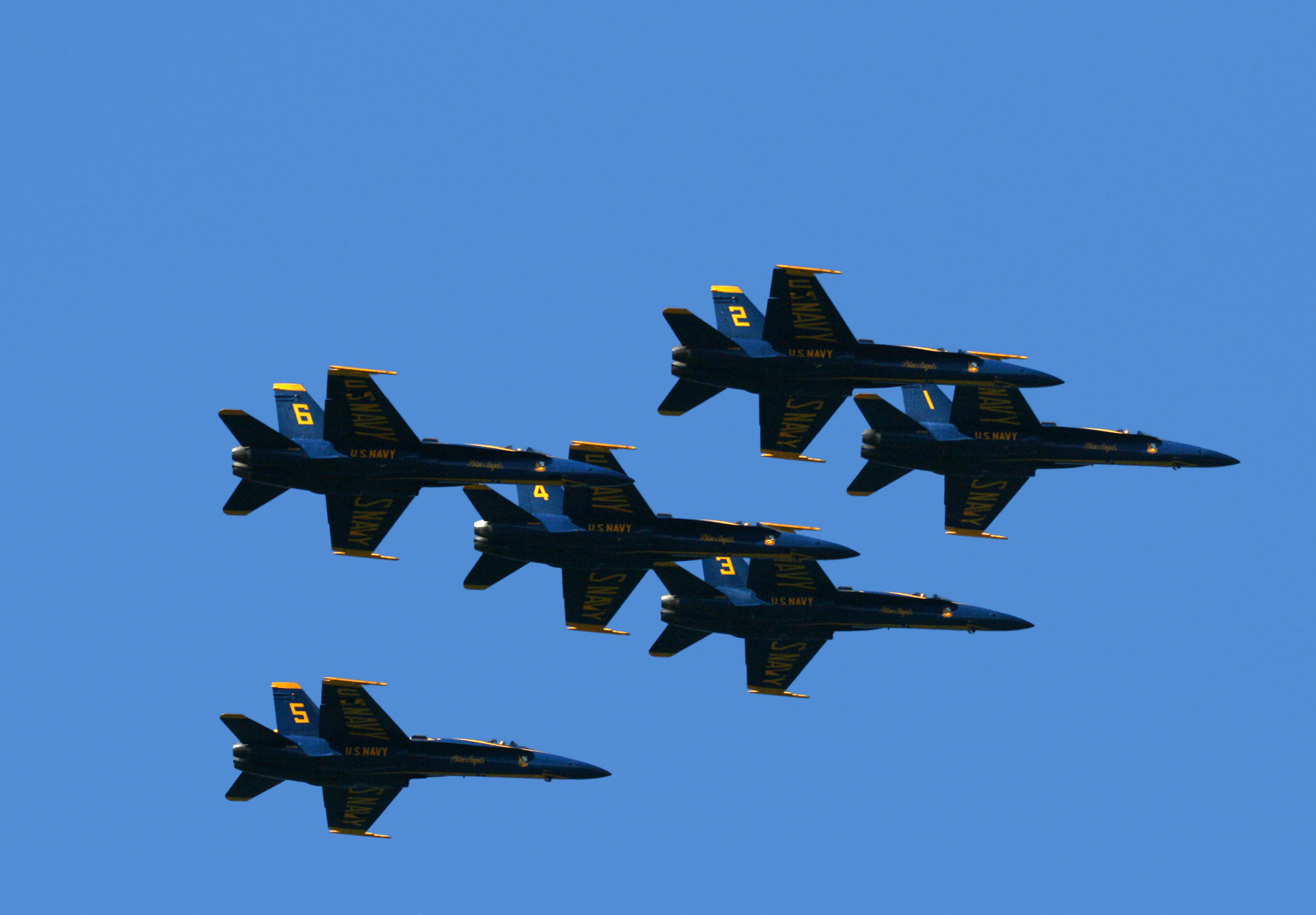
F/A-18 Hornets performing in San Francisco

On 22 May 2011, the Blue Angels were performing at the Lynchburg Regional Airshow in Lynchburg, Virginia, when the Diamond formation flew the Barrel Roll Break maneuver at an altitude lower than the required minimum. The maneuver was aborted, the remainder of the demonstration canceled and all aircraft landed safely. The next day, the Blue Angels announced that they were initiating a safety stand-down, canceling their upcoming Naval Academy Airshow and returning to their home base in Pensacola, Florida, for additional training and airshow practice. On 26 May, the Blue Angels announced they would not be flying their traditional fly-over of the Naval Academy Graduation Ceremony and that they were canceling their 28–29 May 2011 performances at the Millville Wings and Wheels Airshow in Millville, New Jersey.

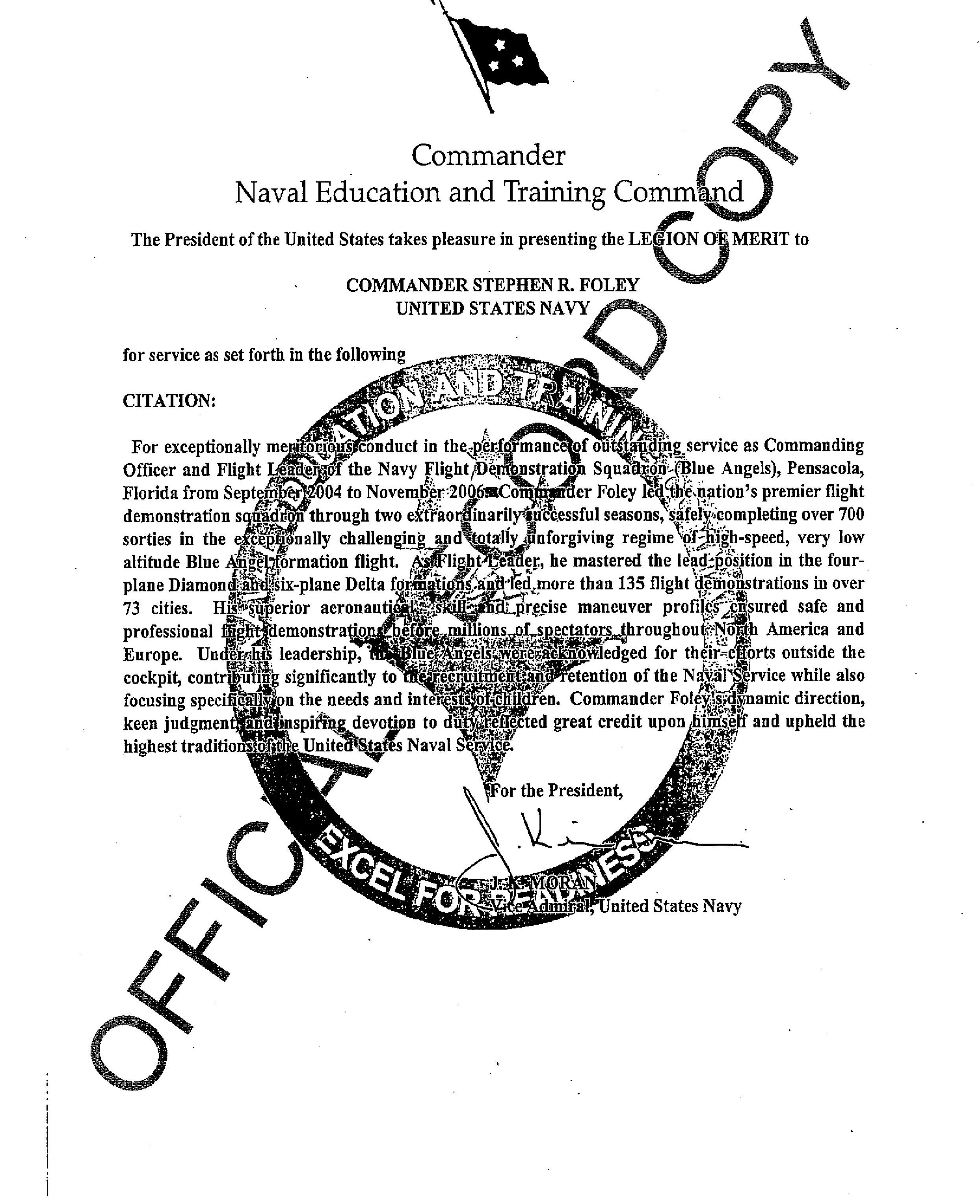
Legion of Merit awarded to Flight Leader Stephen Foley

On 27 May 2011, the Blue Angels announced that Commander Dave Koss, the squadron's commanding officer, would be stepping down. He was replaced by Captain Greg McWherter, the team's previous commanding officer. The squadron canceled two performances to allow additional practice and demonstration training.

On 29 July 2011, a new Blue Angels Mustang GT was auctioned off for $400,000 at the Experimental Aircraft Association AirVenture Oshkosh (Oshkosh Air Show) annual summer gathering of aviation enthusiasts from 25 to 31 July in Oshkosh, Wisconsin which had an attendance of 541,000 persons and 2,522 show planes.

Between 2 and 4 September 2011 on Labor Day weekend, the Blue Angels flew for the first time with a fifty-fifty blend of conventional JP-5 jet fuel and a camelina-based biofuel at Naval Air Station Patuxent River, Maryland. McWherter flew an F/A-18 test flight on 17 August and stated there were no noticeable performance differences.

On 1 March 2013, the Navy announced that it was cancelling its remaining 2013 performances after 1 April 2013 due to sequestration budget constraints, resuming in 2014 with a reduced number of flyovers. On 15 March 2014, the demonstration pilots numbered 1–7 wore gold flight suits to celebrate the team's "return to the skies" during their first air show of the season; only three performances were completed in 2013.

In July 2014, Marine Corps C-130 pilot Capt. Katie Higgins, 27, became the first female pilot to join the Blue Angels, flying the support aircraft Fat Albert for the 2015 and 2016 show seasons.

In July 2015, Cmdr. Bob Flynn became the Blue Angels' first executive officer.

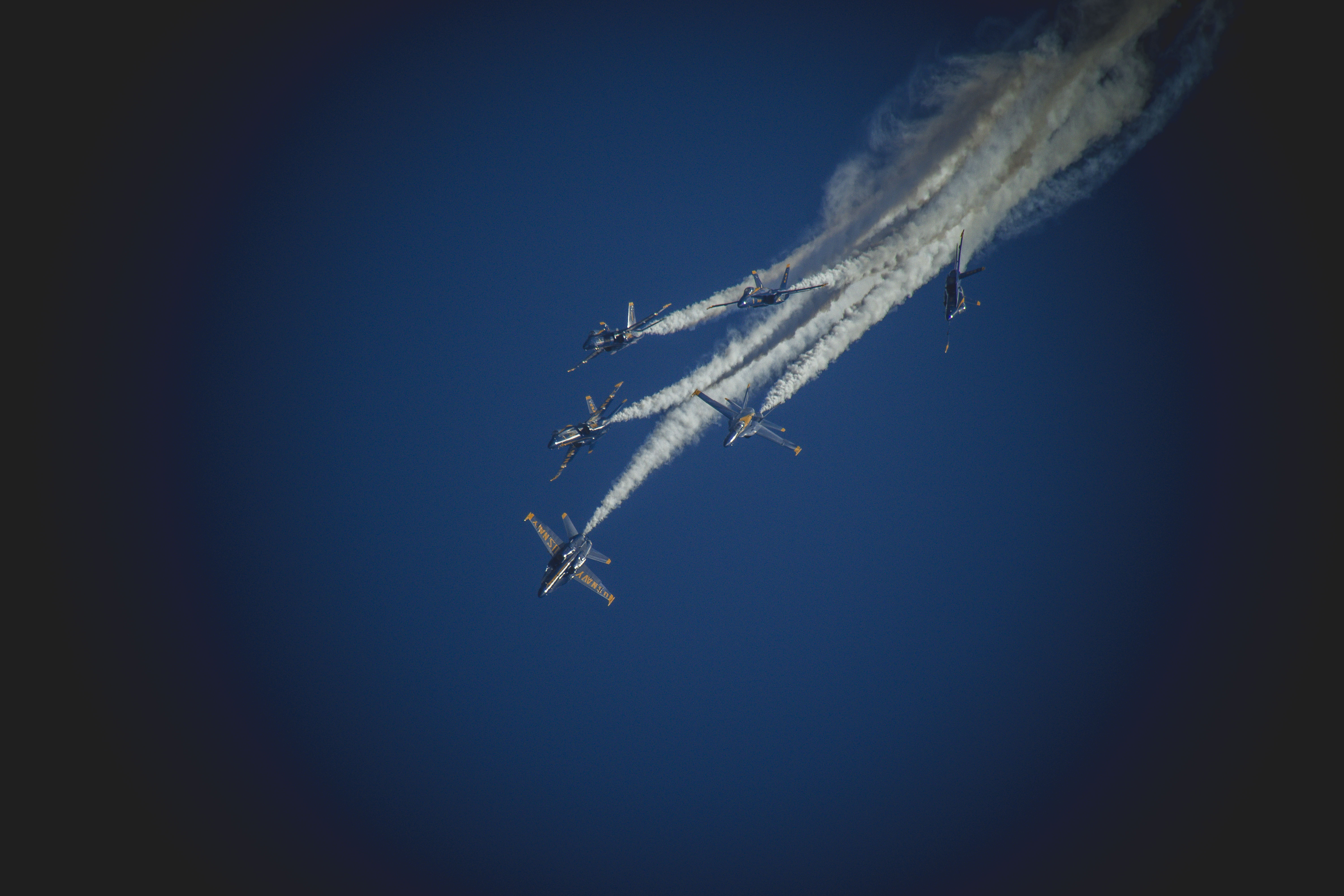
Blue Angels perform at Miami Beach on Memorial Day, 2019

In July 2016, Boeing was awarded a $12 million contract to begin an engineering proposal for converting the Boeing F/A-18E/F Super Hornet for Blue Angels use, with the proposal to be completed by September 2017.

The Fat Albert (BUNO 164763) was retired from service in May 2019 with 30,000 flight hours. The Blue Angels replaced it with a C-130J Super Hercules acquired from the Royal Air Force (BUNO 170000).

=== 2020–present ===
Blue Angels Blue Season Look-Back (2024)

In response to the COVID-19 pandemic, the Blue Angels flew over multiple US cities in tribute to healthcare and front line workers.

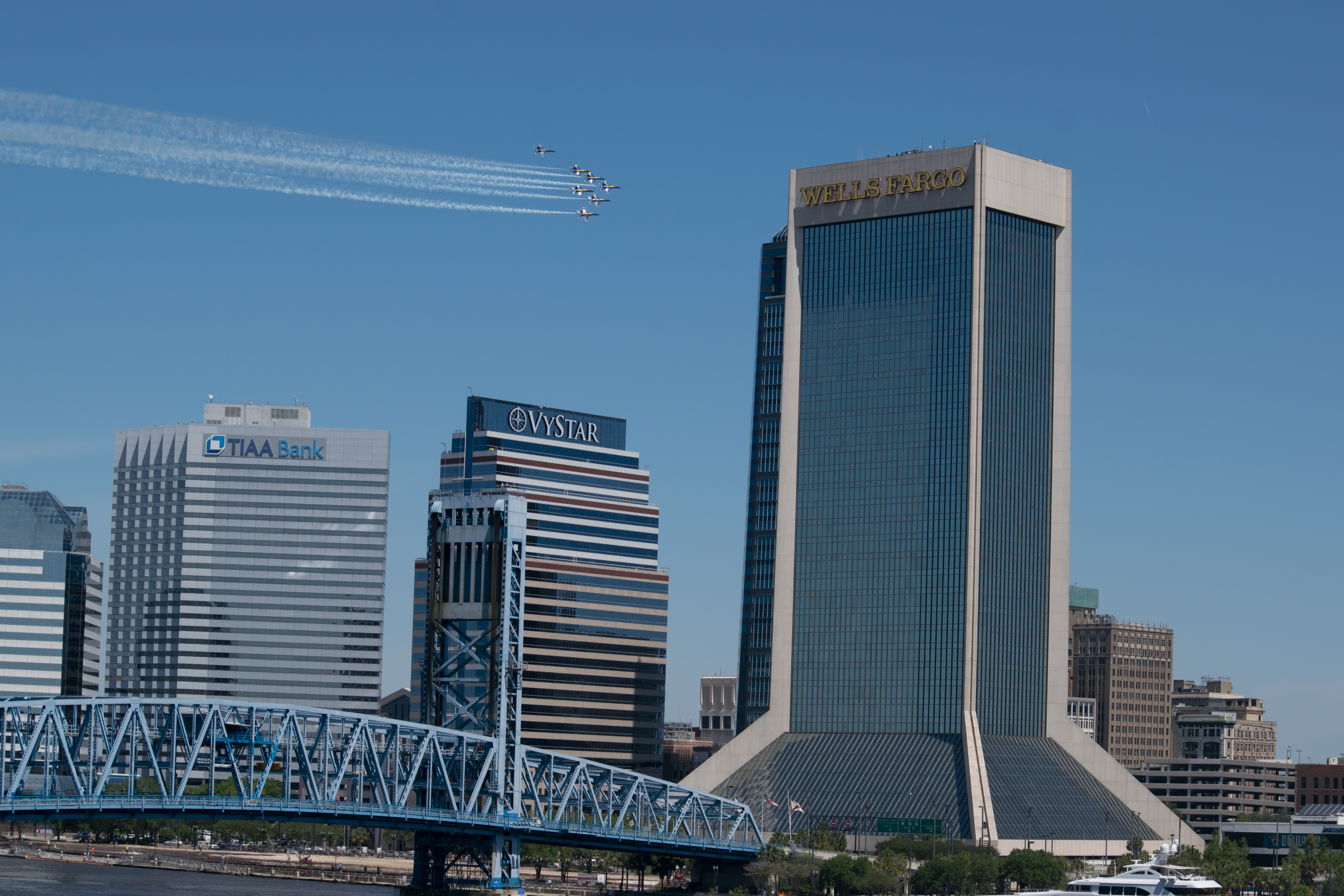
The Blue Angels Flying over the Jacksonville Florida City Center on 8 May 2020 as a tribute flight to frontline healthcare workers.

The Blues transitioned to Boeing F/A-18E/F Super Hornets on 4 November 2020.

In July 2022, Lt. Amanda Lee was announced as the first woman to serve as a demonstration pilot in the Blue Angels.

On 15 July 2026, the Blue Angels made a low-altitude pass over Pensacola Beach, with the Navy stating that the pilots had flew “lower than standard profiles”, and were conducting a safety review. Then-acting Secretary of the Navy Hung Cao announced there would be no reprimands or punishments for the pilots involved. Secretary of Defense Pete Hegseth posted on X that "The flyovers will continue until morale improves", referring to recent other incidents that had occurred during Hegseth's tenure.

== Aircraft timeline ==
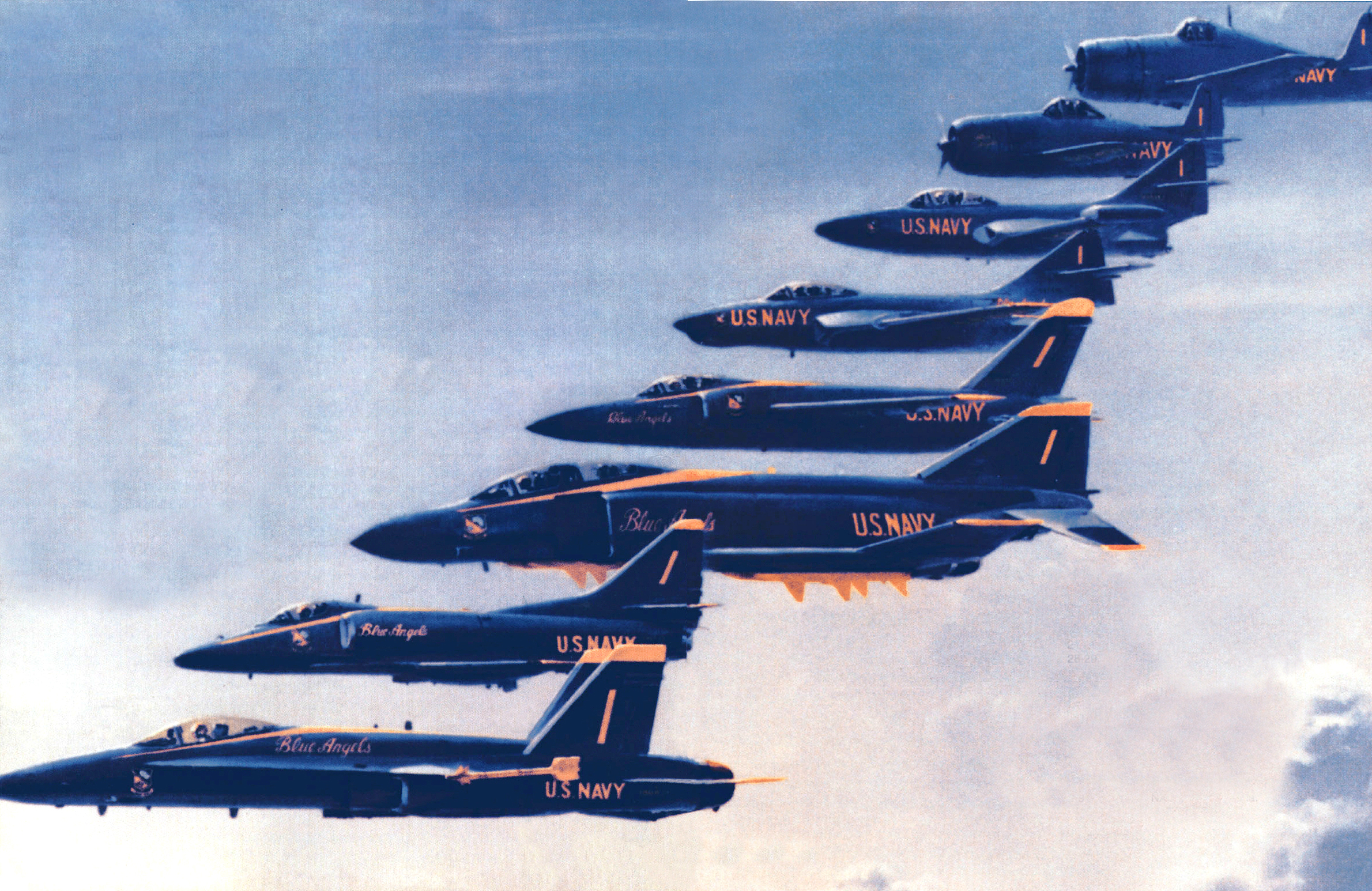
Drawing depicting all demonstration aircraft flown from 1946 to 1996.

The "Blues" have flown ten different demonstration aircraft and six support aircraft models:

Demonstration aircraft

- Grumman F6F-5 Hellcat: June – August 1946
- Grumman F8F-1 Bearcat: August 1946 – 1949
- Grumman F9F-2 Panther: 1949 – June 1950 (first jet); F9F-5 Panther: 1951 – Winter 1954/55
- Grumman F9F-8 Cougar: Winter 1954/55 – mid-season 1957 (swept-wing)
- Grumman F11F-1 (F-11) Tiger: mid-season 1957 – 1968 (first supersonic jet)
- McDonnell Douglas F-4J Phantom II: 1969 – December 1974
- Douglas A-4F Skyhawk: December 1974 – November 1986
- McDonnell Douglas F/A-18 Hornet (F/A-18B as #7): November 1986 – 2010
- Boeing F/A-18A/C (B/D as #7) Hornet: 2010 – 2020
- Boeing F/A-18E Super Hornet (F/A-18F as #7): 2020–

Support aircraft

- JRB Expeditor (Beech 18): 1949–?
- Douglas R4D-6 Skytrain: 1949–1955
- Curtiss R5C Commando: 1953
- Douglas R5D Skymaster: 1956–1968
- Lockheed C-121 Super Constellation: 1969–1973
- Lockheed C-130 Hercules "Fat Albert": 1970–2019 (JATO usage was stopped in 2009)
- Lockheed Martin C-130J Super Hercules "Fat Albert": 2020–present

Miscellaneous aircraft

- North American SNJ Texan "Beetle Bomb" (used to simulate a Japanese A6M Zero aircraft in demonstrations during the late 1940s)
- Lockheed T-33 Shooting Star (Used during the 1950s as a VIP transport aircraft for the team)
- Vought F7U Cutlass (two of the unusual F7Us were received in late 1952 and flown as a side demonstration during the 1953 season but they were not a part of their regular formations which at the time used the F9F Panther. Pilots and ground crew found it unsatisfactory and a plan to use it as the team's primary aircraft was canceled).

== Commanding officers ==
- Roy Marlin Voris – 1946, 1952
- John J. Magda – 1950, Killed in Action March 1951, Korean War
- Arthur Ray Hawkins – 1952 to 1953
- Richard Cormier – 1954 to 1956
- Edward B. Holley – 1957 to 1958
- Zebulon V. Knott – 1959 to 1961
- Kenneth R. Wallace – 1962 to 1963
- Robert F. Aumack – 1964 to 1966
- William V. Wheat – 1967 to 1969
- Harley H. Hall – 1970 to 1971
- Don Bently – 1972
- Marvin F. "Skip" Umstead – 1973
- Anthony A. Less – Oct 1973 to Jan 1976
- Keith S. Jones – 1976 to 1978
- William E. Newman – 1978 to 1979
- Hugh D. Wisely – Dec 1979 to 1982
- David Carroll – 1982 to 1983
- Larry Pearson – 1983 to 1985
- Gilman E. Rud – Nov 1985 to Nov 1988
- Patrick D. Moneymaker – Nov 1988 to Nov 1990
- Gregory C. Wooldridge – Nov 1990 to 1993, 1996
- Robert E. Stumpf – 1993 to 1994
- Donnie Cochran – Nov 1994 to May 1996
- George B. Dom – Nov 1996 to Oct 1998
- Patrick Driscoll – Oct 1998 to 2000

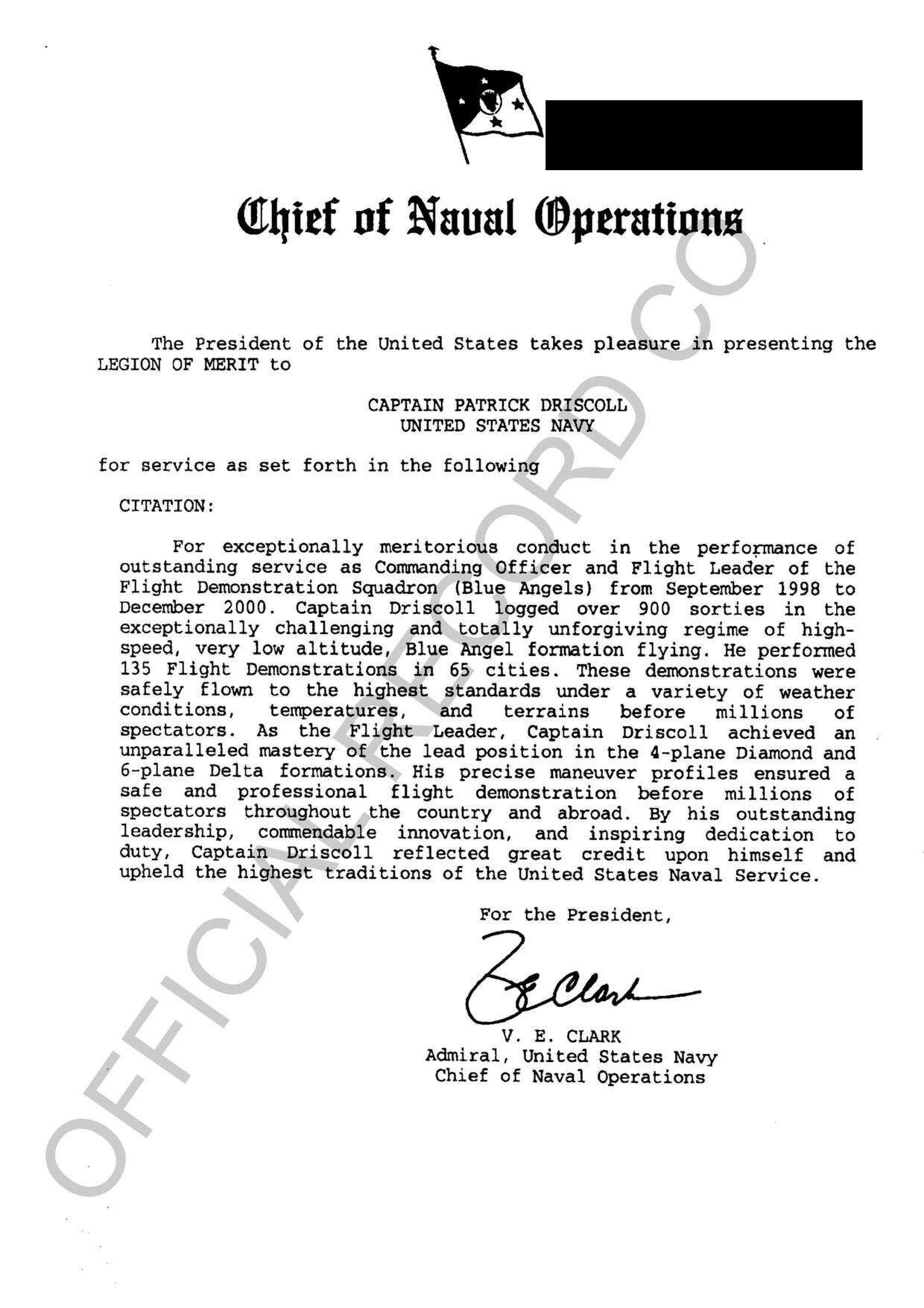
Legion of Merit awarded to Blue Angels Flight Leader Capt Driscoll

- Robert A. Field – 2000 to Sept 2002
- Russell J. Bartlett – Sept 2002 to Sept 2004
- Stephen R. Foley – Sept 2004 to Nov 2006
- Kevin Mannix – Nov 2006 to 2008

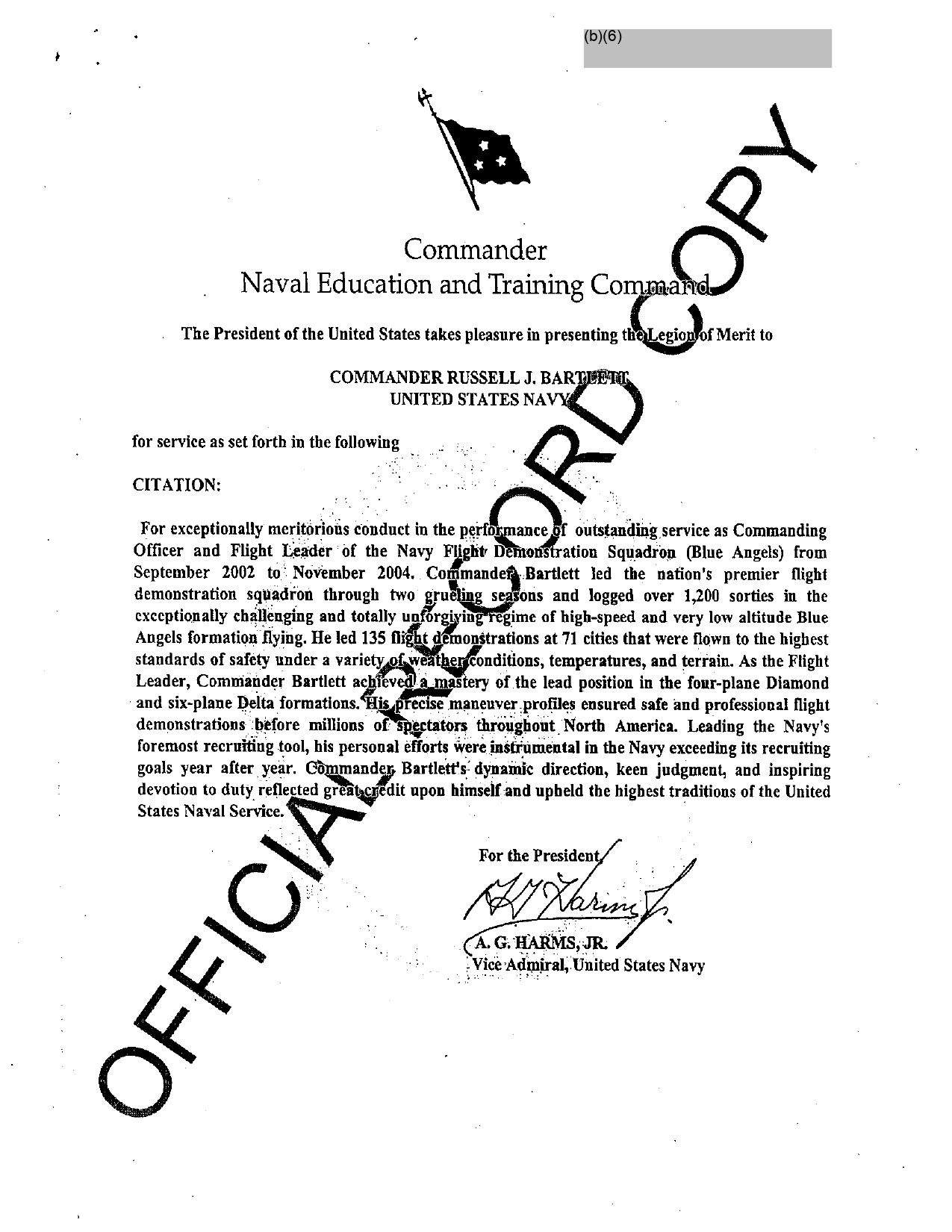
Legion of Merit awarded to Russ Bartlett - CO, Blue Angels, Navy flight demonstration squadron 2002-2004

- Gregory McWherter 2008 to 2010, 2011
- David Koss – Fall 2010 to spring 2011
- Gregory McWherter – 2011 to 2012
- Thomas Frosch – 2012 to 2015
- Ryan Bernacchi – 2015 to 2017
- Eric D. Doyle – 2017 to 2019
- Brian C. Kesselring – 2019 to 2022
- Alexander P. Armatas – 2022 to 2024
- Adam Bryan – 2024 to 2026
- Logan R. Peck – 2027 to 2028

== Notable members ==
Below are some of the more notable members of the Blue Angels squadron:

- Capt Roy "Butch" Voris, World War II fighter ace and first Flight Leader
- Charles "Chuck" Brady Jr., Astronaut and physician
- Donnie Cochran, First African-American Blue Angels aviator and commander
- Edward L. Feightner, World War II fighter ace and Lead Solo
- Arthur Ray Hawkins, World War II flying ace
- Bob Hoover, World War II fighter pilot and flight instructor, honorary Blue Angel member
- Anthony A. Less, First Commanding Officer of Blue Angels squadron, numerous other commands including Naval Air Forces Atlantic Fleet
- Robert L. Rasmussen, aviation artist
- Raleigh Rhodes, World War II and Korean War fighter pilot and third Flight Leader of the Blue Angels
- Patrick M. Walsh, Left Wingman and Slot Pilot who later commanded the U.S. Pacific Fleet and became Vice Chief of Naval Operations and a White House Fellow
- Katie Higgins Cook, First female Blue Angels pilot
- Amanda Lee, First female Blue Angels demonstration pilot

== Team accidents and deaths ==
A total of 20 Blue Angels pilots and one crew member have died while assigned to the flight team. Four other pilots died in combat action after their service with the Blue Angels.

=== Deaths ===
- Lt. Ross "Robby" Robinson – 29 September 1946: killed during a performance when a wingtip broke off his F8F-1 Bearcat, sending him into an unrecoverable spin.
- Lt. Bud Wood – 7 July 1952: killed when his F9F-5 Panther collided with another Panther jet during a demonstration in Corpus Christi, Texas. The team resumed performances two weeks later.
- Cmdr. Robert Nicholls Glasgow – 14 October 1958: died during an orientation flight just days after reporting for duty as the new Blue Angels leader.
- Lt. Anton M. Campanella (#3 Left Wing) – 14 June 1960: killed flying a Grumman F-11A Tiger that crashed into the water near Fort Morgan, Alabama during a test flight.
- Lt. George L. Neale – 15 March 1964: killed during an attempted emergency landing at Apalach Airport near Apalachicola, Florida. Lt. Neale's F-11A Tiger had experienced mechanical difficulties during a flight from West Palm Beach, to Naval Air Station Pensacola, causing him to attempt the emergency landing. Failing to reach the airport, he ejected from the aircraft on final approach, but his parachute did not have sufficient time to fully deploy.
- Lt. Cmdr. Dick Oliver – 2 September 1966: crashed his F-11A Tiger and was killed at the Canadian International Air Show in Toronto.
- Lt Frank Gallagher – 1 February 1967: killed when his F-11A Tiger stalled during a practice Half Cuban Eight maneuver and spun into the ground.
- Capt. Ronald Thompson – 18 February 1967: killed when his F-11A Tiger struck the ground during a practice formation loop.
- Lt. Bill Worley (Opposing Solo) – 14 January 1968: killed when his Tiger crashed during a practice double Immelmann.
- Lt. Larry Watters – 14 February 1972: killed when his F-4J Phantom II struck the ground, upright, while practicing inverted flight, during winter training at NAF El Centro.
- Lt. Cmdr. Skip Umstead (Team Leader), Capt. Mike Murphy, and ADJ1 Ron Thomas (Crew Chief) – 26 July 1973: all three were killed in a mid-air collision between two Phantoms over Lakehurst, New Jersey, during an arrival practice. The rest of the season was cancelled after this incident.
- Lt. Nile Kraft (Opposing Solo) – 22 February 1977: killed when his Skyhawk struck the ground during practice.
- Lt. Michael Curtin – 8 November 1978: one of the solo Skyhawks struck the ground after low roll during arrival maneuvers at Naval Air Station Miramar, and Curtin was killed.
- Lt. Cmdr. Stu Powrie (Lead Solo) – 22 February 1982: killed when his Skyhawk struck the ground during winter training at Naval Air Facility El Centro, California, just after a dirty loop.
- Lt. Cmdr. Mike Gershon (Opposing Solo #6) – 13 July 1985: his Skyhawk collided with Lt. Andy Caputi (Lead Solo #5) during a show at Niagara Falls, Gershon was killed and Caputi ejected and parachuted to safety.
- Lt. Cmdr. Kieron O'Connor and Lt. Kevin Colling – 28 October 1999: flying in the back seat and front seat of a Hornet, both were killed after striking the ground during circle and arrival maneuvers in Valdosta, Georgia.
- Lt. Cmdr. Kevin J. Davis – 21 April 2007: crashed his Hornet near the end of the Marine Corps Air Station Beaufort airshow in Beaufort, South Carolina, and was killed.
- Capt. Jeff Kuss (Opposing Solo, #6) – 2 June 2016: died just after takeoff while performing the Split-S maneuver in his F/A-18 Hornet during a practice run for The Great Tennessee Air Show in Smyrna, Tennessee.

=== Other incidents ===
- Lt. John R. Dewenter – 2 August 1958: landed wheels up at Buffalo Niagara International Airport after experiencing engine troubles during a show in Clarence, New York. The Grumman F-11 Tiger landed on Runway 23, but exited airport property, coming to rest in the intersection of Genesee Street and Dick Road, nearly hitting a filling station. Lt. Dewenter was uninjured, but the plane was a total loss.
- Lt. Ernie Christensen – 30 August 1970: belly-landed his F-4J Phantom at The Eastern Iowa Airport in Cedar Rapids, Iowa, after he inadvertently left the landing gear in the up position. He ejected safely, while the aircraft slid off the runway.
- Cmdr. Harley Hall – 4 June 1971: safely ejected after his F-4J Phantom jet caught fire during practice over NAS Quonset Point in North Kingstown, Rhode Island, and crashed in Narragansett Bay.
- Capt. John Fogg, Lt. Marlin Wiita, and Lt. Cmdr. Don Bently – 8 March 1973: all three survived a multi-aircraft mid-air collision during practice over Superstition Mountain, near El Centro, California.
- Lt. Jim Ross (Lead Solo) – 15 May 1980: unhurt when his Skyhawk suffered a fuel line fire during a show at Roosevelt Roads Naval Station, Puerto Rico. Lt. Ross stayed with the plane and landed, leaving the end of the runway and rolling into the woods after a total hydraulic failure upon landing.
- Lt. Dave Anderson (Lead Solo) – 12 February 1987: ejected from his Hornet after a dual engine flame-out during practice near El Centro, California.
- Marine Corps Maj. Charles Moseley and Cmdr. Pat Moneymaker – 23 January 1990: their Blue Angel Hornets suffered a mid-air collision during a practice at El Centro. Moseley ejected safely and Moneymaker was able to land his airplane, which then required a complete right wing replacement.
- Lt. Ted Steelman – 1 December 2004: ejected from his F/A-18 approximately one mile off Perdido Key after his aircraft struck the water, suffering catastrophic engine and structural damage. He suffered minor injuries.

== Combat casualties ==
Four former Blue Angels pilots have been killed in action or died after being captured, all having been downed by anti-aircraft fire.

=== Korean War ===
- Commander John Magda – 8 March 1951: Blue Angels (1949, 1950; Commander/Flight Leader 1950): Magda was killed after his F9F-2B Panther was hit by anti–aircraft fire while leading a low-level strike mission against North Korean and Chinese communist positions at Tanchon which earned him the Navy Cross during the Korean War. Earlier he was a fighter ace in World War II.

=== Vietnam War ===
- Commander Herbert P. Hunter – 19 July 1967: Blue Angels (1957–1959; Lead Solo pilot): Hunter was hit by anti-aircraft fire in North Vietnam and crashed in his F-8E Crusader. He was awarded the Distinguished Flying Cross posthumously for actions on 16 July 1967. He was a Korean War veteran.
- Captain Clarence O. Tolbert – 6 November 1972: Blue Angels (1968): Tolbert was flying a Corsair II (A-7B) during a mission in North Vietnam and was hit by anti-aircraft fire, crashed, and died. He was awarded the Silver Star and Distinguished Flying Cross for his service.
- Captain Harley H. Hall – 27 January 1973: Blue Angels (1970–1971; Commander/Team Leader 1971): Hall and his co-pilot were shot down by anti-aircraft fire in South Vietnam flying their F-4J Phantom II on the last day of the Vietnam War, and they both were officially listed as prisoners of war. In 1980, Hall was presumed to have died while captured. His remains were identified on 6 September 1994.

== In the media ==
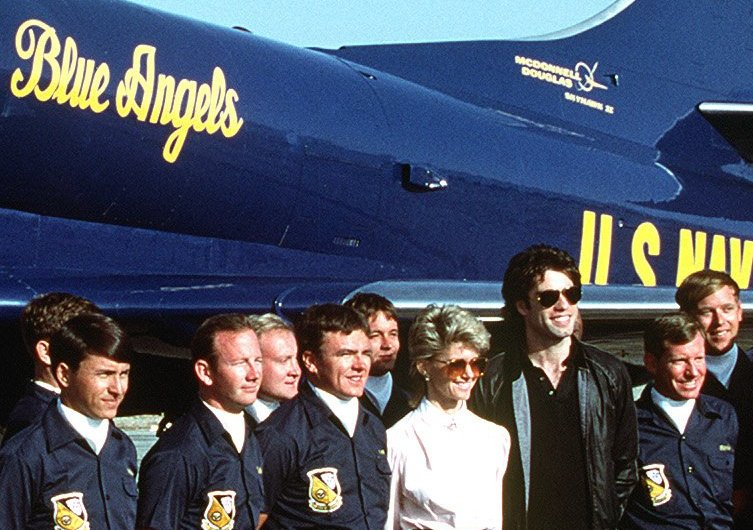
John Travolta and Olivia Newton-John with Blue Angels, 1982

- The Blue Angels was a dramatic television series, starring Dennis Cross and Don Gordon, inspired by the team's exploits and filmed with the cooperation of the Navy. It aired in syndication from 26 September 1960 to 3 July 1961.
- Threshold: The Blue Angels Experience is a 1975 documentary film, written by Dune author Frank Herbert, featuring the team in practice and performance during their F-4J Phantom era; many of the aerial photography techniques pioneered in Threshold were later used in Top Gun.
- To Fly!, a short IMAX film featured at the Smithsonian Air and Space Museum since its 1976 opening features footage from a camera on a Blue Angels A4 Skyhawk tail as the pilot performs in a show.
- In 1981, the Blue Angels along with the Thunderbirds were featured on a Laserdisc released in Japan called Blue Angels/Thunderbirds.
- The Blue Angels were featured in the 1986 music video for "Dreams" by rock band Van Halen, flying the A-4 Skyhawk.
- In 1987, the Blue Angels were featured in Rolling in the Sky: F/A-18 Blue Angels.
- In 1996, the Blue Angels appeared in The Magic of Flight, narrated by Tom Selleck.
- In 2005, the Discovery Channel aired a documentary miniseries, Blue Angels: A Year in the Life, focusing on the intricate day-to-day details of that year's training and performance schedule.
- In 2009, MythBusters enlisted the aid of Blue Angels to help test the myth that a sonic boom could shatter glass.
- In 2024, the Blue Angels appeared in The Blue Angels, depicting the team's 2022 training and show seasons.

== See also ==
- List of United States Navy aircraft squadrons
- United States Air Force Thunderbirds
- United States Marine Corps Aviation
- Sagar Pawan
