= Threshold: The Blue Angels Experience =

- Directed by: Paul Marlow
- Written by: Frank Herbert
- Produced by: Paul Marlow
- Starring: Blue Angels team in F-4 Phantoms
- Narrated by: Leslie Nielsen
- Cinematography: Dave Gardner & Paul Marlow
- Edited by: Tony Magra & Dave Gardner
- Music by: Fred Myrow
- Release date: 1975
- Running time: 96 minutes (short version 46 mins.)
- Country: United States
- Language: English

Threshold: The Blue Angels Experience is a 1975 American film featuring narration written by Frank Herbert and read by Leslie Nielsen. The film is about the Blue Angels, the United States Navy's flight demonstration squadron.

== See also ==
- List of American films of 1975
