= Delta formation =

Type of aircraft formation

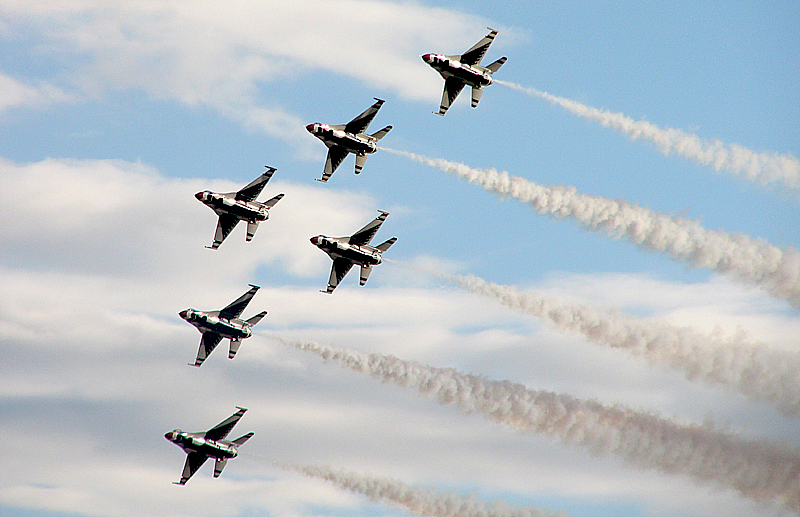
The Thunderbirds form up into a delta

Delta formation is a flight pattern where multiple flying objects will come together in a V in order to fly more efficiently. Each trailing object is positioned slightly higher than the one in front, and uses the air moved by the forward object to reduce wind resistance.

The delta formation is frequently used by birds to migrate over long distances, in airplanes, and in UAVs.

The most famous use of the delta formation is by the United States Air Force's demonstration squadron the Thunderbirds. The Thunderbirds will use six aircraft that come together, typically at the end of an air show and fly in tight formation.

== Advantages and basic mechanics ==
Flying in a delta formation can allow for a longer flight time with the same amount of energy. This saves time and resources and reduces the potential need to stop in dangerous territories.

When in flight, upwash is generated behind the wing by wingtip vortices, this is air that was diverted upwards to generate lift. In a delta formation, the trailing object follows closely behind and slightly above the lead. This allows the upwash from the lead to generate lift for the trailing object in flight. When using the excess lift from the lead the trailing object does not need to generate as much lift, leading to the increased efficiency. This can be used in a large delta formation allowing for increased efficiency at scale. Since the excess lift from the lead was already being generated, this does not require more energy from the lead, and uses energy that would otherwise be unused. This allows for some birds to use up to 30% less energy when they fly in a delta formation.

== United States Air Force's Thunderbirds ==
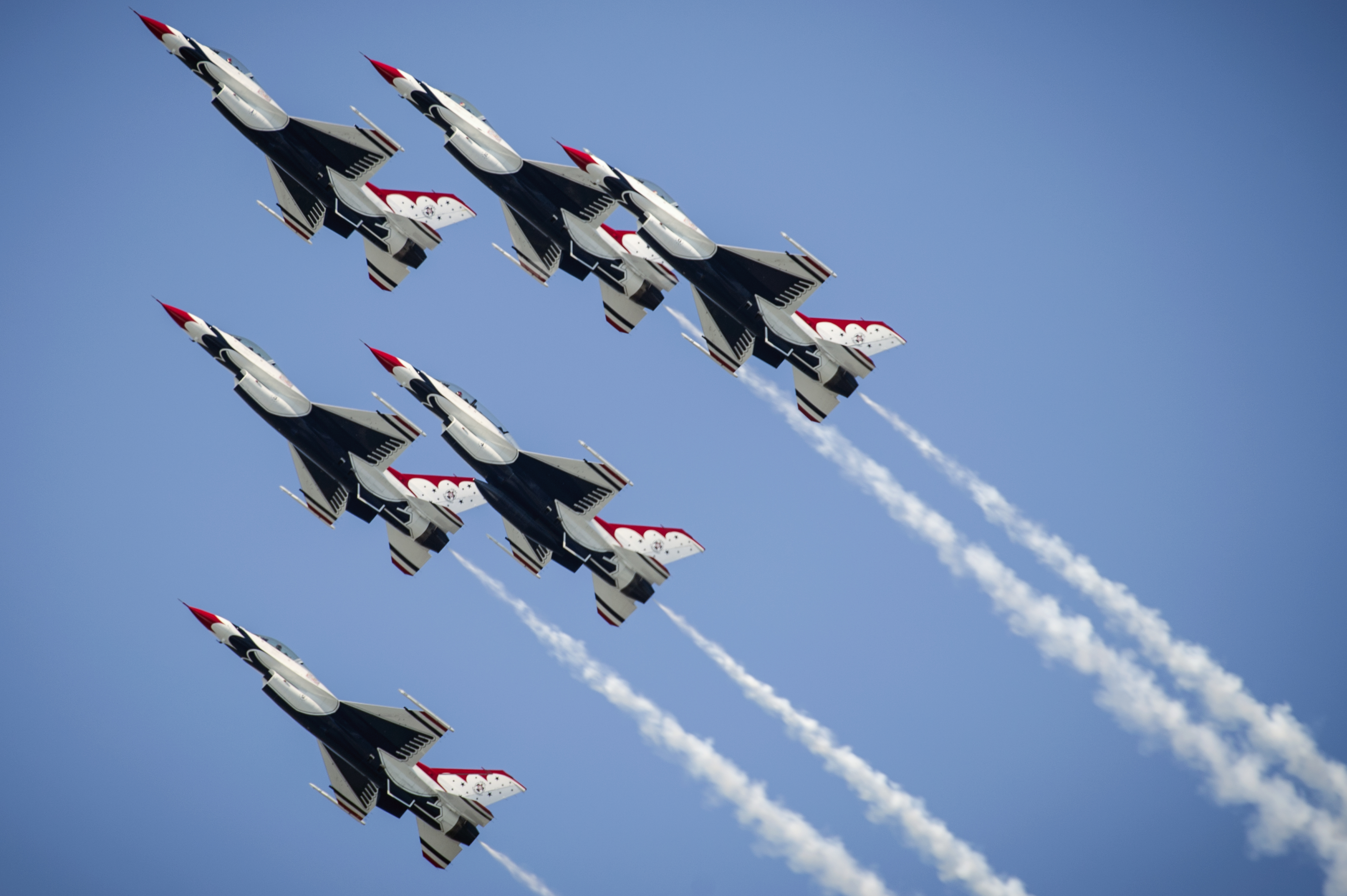
Underside of Thunderbirds planes during a delta formation at Keesler Air Force Base

The delta formation was made famous by the United States Air Force's Air Demonstration Squadron, the Thunderbirds. When the Thunderbirds fly in a delta formation all six of the squadron's airplanes fly in a tight delta. In close formation the aircraft can have as little as 0.5 meters (1.5 feet) of separation between them.

In shows the team forms in the delta multiple times and planes on the edge of the formation break off for solo stunts while the central four stay together. Delta formation tricks are usually saved until the end of the show.

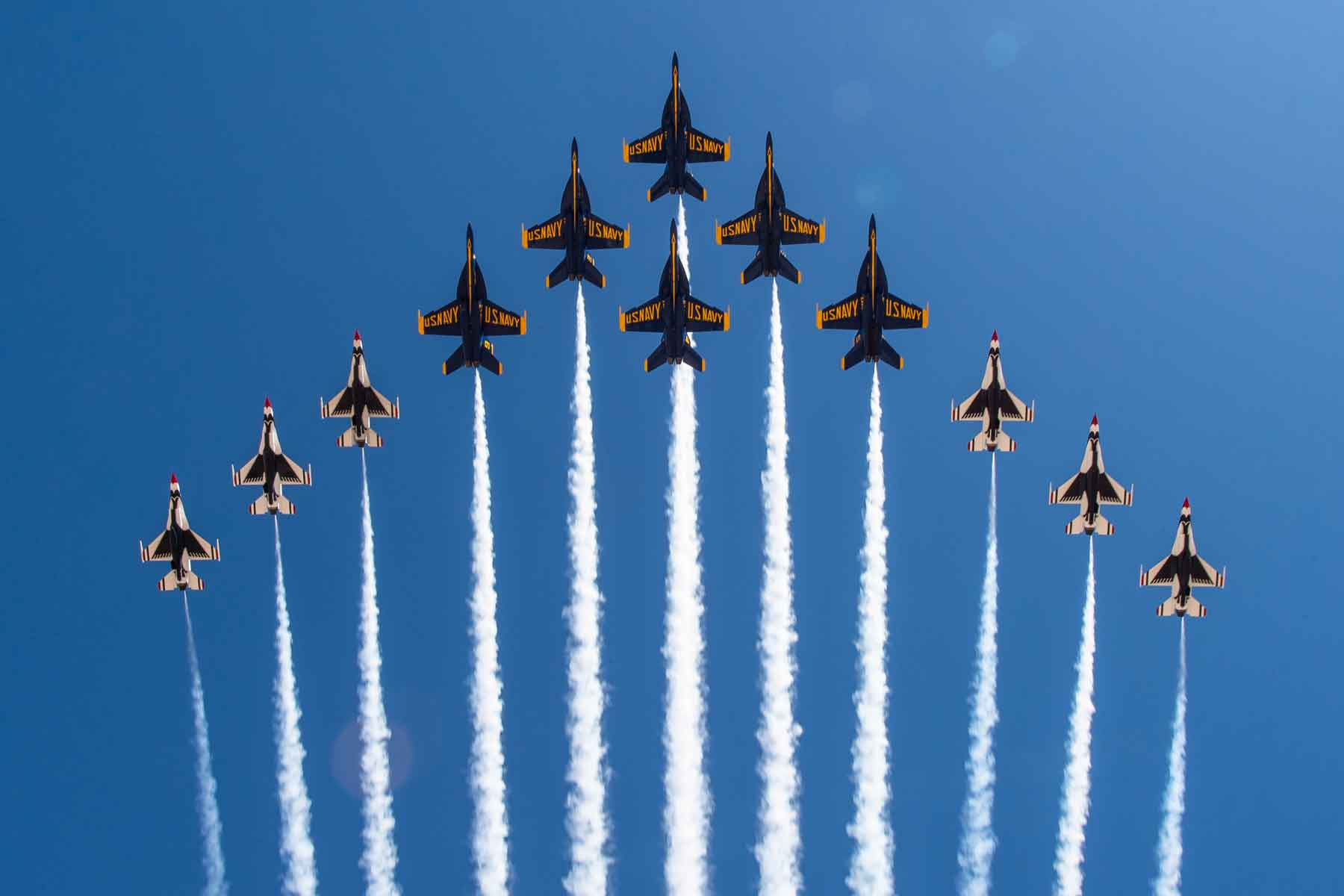
The Thunderbirds and Blue Angels debut "super delta" over Naval Air Facility El Centro

=== Super Delta ===
In 2021 the Navy's Blue Angels and the Air Force's Thunderbirds teamed up with a "super delta" formation. In the super delta the Blue Angels form a typical delta formation in the center and are flanked by three Thunderbirds on each side. The teams were able to train together with the additional practice time allowed to the COVID-19 pandemic canceling air shows.

== Practical use ==
As flight controls become more and more automated, large scale formation flight is becoming more realistic. In order to save fuel many UAV manufacturers are experimenting with using the delta formations, and formations like it, in commercial applications.

=== UAVs ===
In unmanned aerial vehicles (UAVs) many manufacturers are developing UAVs that can fly in a delta formation over long distances to increase range. In these formations, called swarms, the UAVs would launch from a distant base station, then fly together to a destination and separate, or individual units could separate from the swarm sooner. They then could fly back together in formation, or fly back individually.

==== UAV application ====
In UAVs the efficiency improvement is combined with a decrease in the amount of humans needed to monitor large scare operations. Some of the use cases include:

- Last mile delivery, where a swarm will deliver packages to their final destination from a nearby hub.
- Observing farmland, where high resolution geo-tagged images can help calculate normalized difference vegetation index (NDVI)
- Containing wild fires, where the fire can be surveyed without putting humans at risk, or to deploy retardant
- Law enforcement, particularly in large scale events
- Border patrol
- Military surveillance

==== UAV communication ====
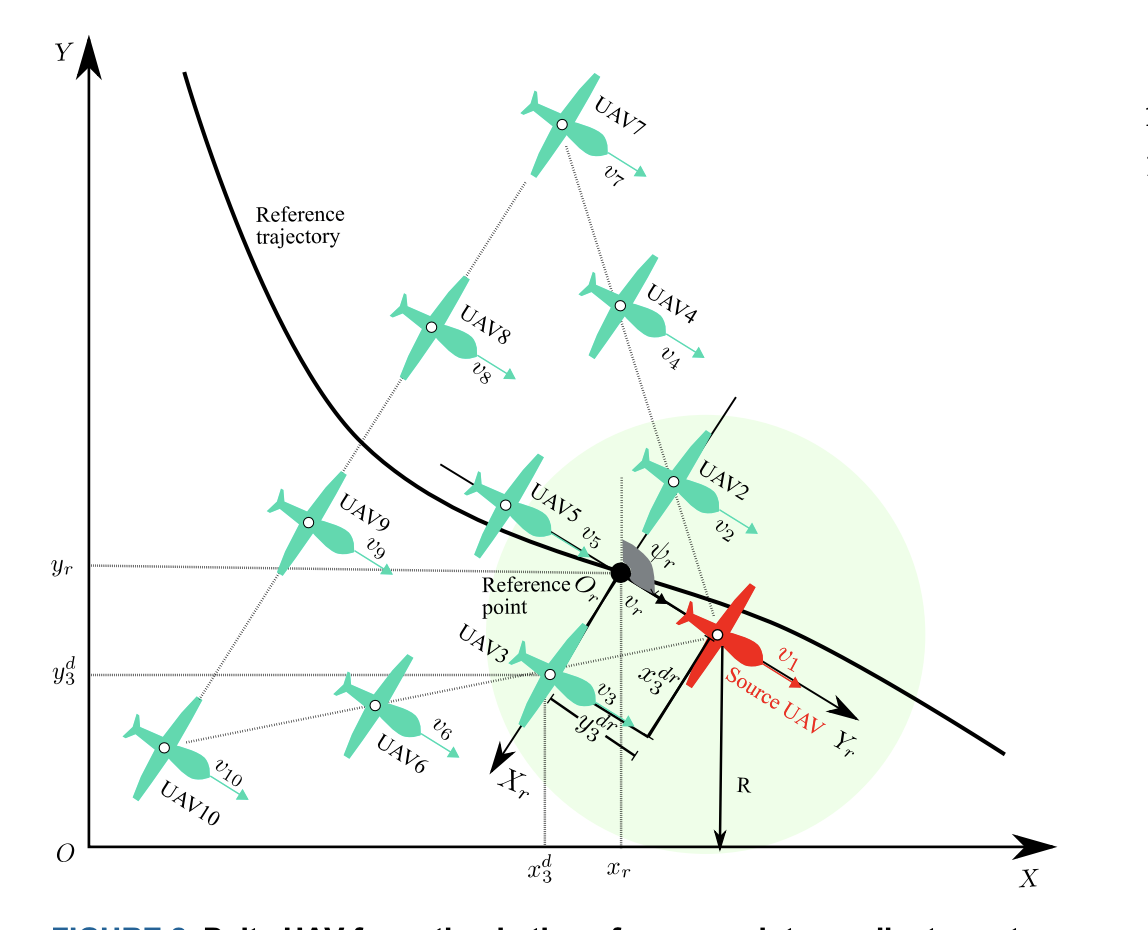
In UAV swarms a reference point and path are predetermined. The source (lead) UAV will follow this reference. The trailing UAVs will then calculate their optimum position based on the reference point

In a swarm, the UAVs have a predefined trajectory path, the lead UAV is designated as the source of information. There is a reference point behind the lead that all the UAVs orient themselves around. Using the location of the UAVs in front they calculate the most efficient position for themselves.

==== Calculating optimum position in UAV formation ====
$$\begin{cases} \dot{P}x = V cos (y) * cos(x)
\\ \dot{P}y = V cos (y) * sin(x)
\\ \dot{P}z = V sin (y)
\\ \dot{V} = \frac{Tcos(a-D)}{m - g * sin(y)}  + \Delta V
\\ \dot{y} = \frac{\frac{T sin(a) cos(\sigma + L cos(\sigma))}{mV - g cos(y)}}{V + \Delta y}
\\ \dot{x} = \left ( \frac{T * sin(a) sin(\sigma) + L sin(\sigma) }{mV + \Delta x} \right )  \end{cases}$$

This system of equations can describe the optimum positioning of UAVs in a swarm. "In this configuration, the UAV can be considered as a point-mass system as where p = [p_{x}, p_{y}, p_{z}]^{T} stands for the position of UAV in the inertial coordinate system; V represents the air speed of UAV; y, x represent the flight path angle and the heading angle; L, T, D are the lift force, thrust force, and drag force, respectively; g denotes the gravity acceleration, α and σ are the attack angle and bank angle, respectively; Δv, Δy, Δx represent the ignored model items associated with the wind gradient and external disturbances. Denote v_{x} = V cos(y) cos(x), v_{y} = V cos(y) sin(x), v_{z} = V sin y as the velocity in inertial coordinate system. For simplicity, the acceleration of air-speed is defined as, the climb rate and heading rate are defined as ω_{y} and ω_{x}, respectively. Then after conversion, the UAV swarm dynamics can be described approximately as the following second-order MAS"

== Birds ==
Birds use the delta formation to fly farther when they are flying as a group. In order to maximize the effect birds will switch the lead when they get tired to allow the flock to fly farther. Birds have evolved to maximize the formation and can sense the birds around them and can position themselves in the best possible spot. They also use the formation as a visual guide to help them stay together.
