= Raleigh Rhodes =

Raleigh Ernest Rhodes
- Born: June 26, 1918; Madera, California
- Died: November 26, 2007 (aged 89); San Jose, California
- Military career
- Allegiance: United States of America
- Branch: United States Navy
- Service years: 1941-1961
- Rank: Commander
- Nickname: "Dusty"
- Unit: Blue Angels
- Conflicts: World War II; Korean War
- Awards: Purple Heart (2)
- Other work: Prisoner of war

Raleigh Ernest Rhodes (June 26, 1918 – November 26, 2007), who often went by the nickname of Raleigh "Dusty" Rhodes, was an American World War II combat fighter pilot and the third leader of the Blue Angels flight team.

== Pilot ==
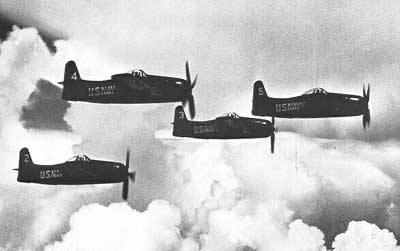
The Blue Angels - picture taken in 1946

Rhodes was a fighter pilot based on board the USS Enterprise (CV-6) aircraft carrier during World War II. He was shot down and captured by Japanese forces during the Battle of the Santa Cruz Islands in October 1942 in the Solomon Islands.

Rhodes spent in the next three years in a Japanese prison camp. He weighed 88 pounds when he was released from his captivity, during which he was starved and beaten.

Rhodes joined the Blue Angels precision flying team in 1947 after his recovery, and soon after became the flight leader. Rhodes helped the Blue Angels perfect the diamond barrel roll, a complicated aerial maneuver in which four Blue Angels jets perform a loop in a tight diamond formation before becoming inverted at the top of the formation. The Blue Angels became extremely popular with the public.

Rhodes returned to an active combat role with the U.S. Navy. He flew fighter plane missions from an aircraft carrier during the Korean War. Following the Korean War, Rhodes was stationed at several naval air stations, including the Naval Air Weapons Station China Lake, Monterey and the Marine Corps Air Station Miramar.

Rhodes was awarded two Purple Hearts and three Air Medals during his twenty years of active duty in the Navy. He retired from the Navy in 1961 at the rank of commander.

Rhodes worked as a project planner for Lockheed Martin facility in Sunnyvale, California, for the next 30 years.

== Death ==
Raleigh Rhodes died of lung cancer on November 26, 2007, in San Jose, California, at the age of 89. He was survived by his wife, Pauline, two daughters and a son.

Rhodes' former wife, Betty, died in 2005. His son, Raleigh E. Rhodes Jr., also died of lung cancer in July 2007.
