= Haze gray and underway =

United States Navy saying

Haze gray and underway is a United States Navy saying that refers to surface ships in arduous duty at sea, in contrast to submarines or naval units in ceremonial roles or in port. It is a term of tribal pride and identification, e.g. surface ship crew use it to distinguish themselves from submarine crew.

== United States Navy saying ==
The United States Navy saying "haze gray and underway" refers firstly to the color "haze gray". Haze gray is a paint color scheme used by USN warships to make the ships harder to see clearly. The gray color reduces the contrast of the ships with the horizon, and reduces the vertical patterns in the ship's appearance. It is the color of USN combatant and auxiliary surface ships, in contrast to the dark gray or black color of submarines, the bright colors of ceremonial vessels and aircraft, or the white of hospital ships and some U.S. Coast Guard cutters. Secondly, "underway", as opposed to being anchored, docked, alongside, moored, or otherwise attached to a fixed place.

Thus, "haze gray and underway" is shorthand for naval surface warships at sea. It is also used to refer to life in a vessel at sea with the working Navy, as opposed to shore postings.
