= Sean Stuart =

American documentary producer, writer and director

Sean Stuart (born June 16, 1978), is an Emmy and Grammy award-winning American documentary producer, writer, and director. He is president of Sutter Road Picture Company, and a partner at Company Name with actor/director Colin Hanks. He is best known for Sly, Challenger: The Final Flight, What's My Name: Muhammad Ali, Mike Judge Presents: Tales from the Tour Bus and All Things Must Pass: The Rise and Fall of Tower Records.

== Early life and education ==
Sean Stuart was raised in Sacramento, California. He attended Jesuit High School in Carmichael, California, and later enrolled at the University of Southern California, where he received a degree from the USC School of Cinematic Arts. While at USC, he played for the USC Trojans men's water polo team, winning the 1998 National Collegiate Men's Water Polo Championship.

Stuart's first job in the entertainment industry came shortly after graduation, when he worked as a production assistant on the original Spider-Man movie, directed by Sam Raimi.

== Career ==
=== Early career and DirecTV ===
Sean Stuart began his career in television, where he played a key role in launching and running The 101 Network (later known as the Audience Network) at DirecTV. From 2005 to 2011, Stuart handled the day-to-day operations alongside his partners. The 101 Network was DirecTV's first original 24-hour broadcast venture.

During this period, Stuart and his team managed the network's production and broadcast of various high-profile projects, including three seasons of Friday Night Lights and the 2009 launch of The Dan Patrick Show, among other original programming. His contributions helped establish DirecTV as a competitive force in original content production.

== Documentary filmmaking ==
=== Company Name with Colin Hanks ===
Soon after his departure from DirecTV, Stuart formed a new media venture, Company Name, with actor/director Colin Hanks, and began production on their first documentary film All Things Must Pass: The Rise and Fall of Tower Records. The film premiered at the South by Southwest (SXSW) Film Festival in 2015, and documented the history and eventual closure of Tower Records.

In 2017, Stuart and Hanks produced Eagles of Death Metal: Nos Amis (Our Friends), a documentary that followed the return of the band Eagles of Death Metal to Paris after the 2015 Bataclan Theatre attack. The film focused on band members Josh Homme and Jesse Hughes as they resumed performing in Paris just months after the tragic event. The documentary aired on HBO and received two nominations at the 2017 Critics' Choice Documentary Awards.

Through their production company, Stuart and Hanks have produced numerous projects for ESPN and their 30 for 30 and FiveThirtyEight brands. Notable works include Say Hey, Willie Mays! for HBO Sports, Thriller 40 with Sony Music for Paramount+, and the 2026 PGA Award winning documentary John Candy: I Like Me with Maximum Effort for Amazon MGM Studios.

=== Sutter Road Picture Company ===
Stuart is the founder and president of Sutter Road Picture Company. Through Sutter Road, he has produced over 20 documentary films and television series. His work has received seven Emmy Award nominations, including one win for What's My Name: Muhammad Ali in the Outstanding Sports Documentary category. He has won a Grammy Award for Jazz Fest: A New Orleans Story, which won Best Music Film at the 2023 Grammy Awards.

Stuart and Sutter Road's other recent films include Chowchilla, Elizabeth Taylor: The Lost Tapes, Willie Nelson & Family, The Blue Angels, Diane von Furstenberg: Woman in Charge, and Road Diary: Bruce Springsteen and the E Street Band.

=== Notable projects ===
In 2015, All Things Must Pass: The Rise and Fall of Tower Records had its world premiere at SXSW, featured in the festivals 24 Beats Per Second screening section.

In 2019, Sean had two films premiere at SXSW: The Gift: The Journey of Johnny Cash (directed by Thom Zimny), and Tread (directed by Paul Solet).

In 2020, What's My Name: Muhammad Ali (directed by Antoine Fuqua) won three prestigious awards: a Sports Emmy Award for Outstanding Long Sports Documentary, a PGA Award for Outstanding Sports Program, and an Eddie Award for Best Edited Documentary: Non-Theatrical.

Also in 2020, Challenger: The Final Flight was nominated for two News & Documentary Emmy Awards: Outstanding Historical Documentary, and Outstanding Editing: Documentary. With Drawn Arms (directed by Glenn Kaino and Afshin Shahidi) was selected as the opening night film at Hamptons International Film Festival; the film also received a nomination for Outstanding Social Issue Documentary at the News & Documentary Emmy Awards.

In 2023, Sly was chosen as the closing night film at the Toronto International Film Festival. Jazz Fest: A New Orleans Story won the Grammy Award for Best Music Film.

In 2024, Diane von Furstenberg: Woman in Charge had its world premiere at Tribeca Film Festival. Also having its world premiere in 2024 was Elizabeth Taylor: The Lost Tapes, which premiered at Cannes Film Festival.

== Filmography ==
Title	Year	Role	Type
John Candy: I Like Me	2025	Producer	Film
Road Diary: Bruce Springsteen and the E Street Band	2024	Producer	Film
Charlie Hustle & the Matter of Pete Rose (4 episodes)	2024	Executive Producer	TV Series
Diane von Furstenberg: Woman in Charge	2024	Producer	Film
The Blue Angels	2024	Producer	Film
Elizabeth Taylor: The Lost Tapes	2024	Producer	Film
Willie Nelson & Family (4 episodes)	2023	Executive Producer	TV Series
Chowchilla	2023	Producer	Film
Thriller 40	2023	Producer	Film
Sly	2023	Producer	Film
Let There Be Drums!	2022	Producer	Film
Bruce Springsteen: Don't Play That Song (Music Video)	2022	Executive Producer	Music Video
Say Hey, Willie Mays!	2022	Producer	Film
Bruce Springsteen: Do I Love You (Indeed I Do) (Music Video)	2022	Executive Producer	Music Video
The Bond (4 episodes)	2022	Executive Producer	TV Series
Jazz Fest: A New Orleans Story	2022	Producer	Film
Four Seasons Total Documentary	2021	Producer	Film (Short)
Wasted Days (Music Video)	2021	Producer	Music Video
UFO (4 episodes)	2021	Executive Producer	TV Miniseries
Cat People (6 episodes)	2021	Executive Producer	TV Series
With Drawn Arms	2020	Producer	Film
Challenger: The Final Flight (4 episodes)	2020	Executive Producer	TV Miniseries
What's My Name: Muhammad Ali	2019	Producer	Film
The Gift: The Journey of Johnny Cash	2019	Producer	Film
Tread	2019	Producer	Film
Mike Judge Presents: Tales from the Tour Bus (16 episodes)	2017–2018	Executive Producer	TV Series
The Amazing Adventures of Wally and the Worm (Short)	2017	Producer	Film (Short)
Ramblin' Freak	2017	Producer	Film
Eagles of Death Metal: Nos Amis (Our Friends)	2017	Producer	Film
Pursuit	2016	Producer	TV Series
Human (9 episodes)	2015–2016	Producer	TV Series
Game Changers	2015	Producer	TV Series
Signals (2 episodes)	2015	Executive Producer	TV Series
All Things Must Pass	2015	Producer	Film
The Anti-Mascot (Short)	2014	Producer	Film (Short)
20 Under 20: Transforming Tomorrow (TV Movie)	2012	Producer	TV Movie
3D Tourist (8 episodes)	2011	Producer	TV Series
The One About the Nun and the Priest (Short)	2006	Producer	Film (Short)
311: Live in Concert, New Orleans - 3-11 Day 2004	2004	Producer & Director	Film (Concert Video)
