= Alexander Armatas =

U.S. Navy Blue Angels pilot

Captain Alexander Armatas
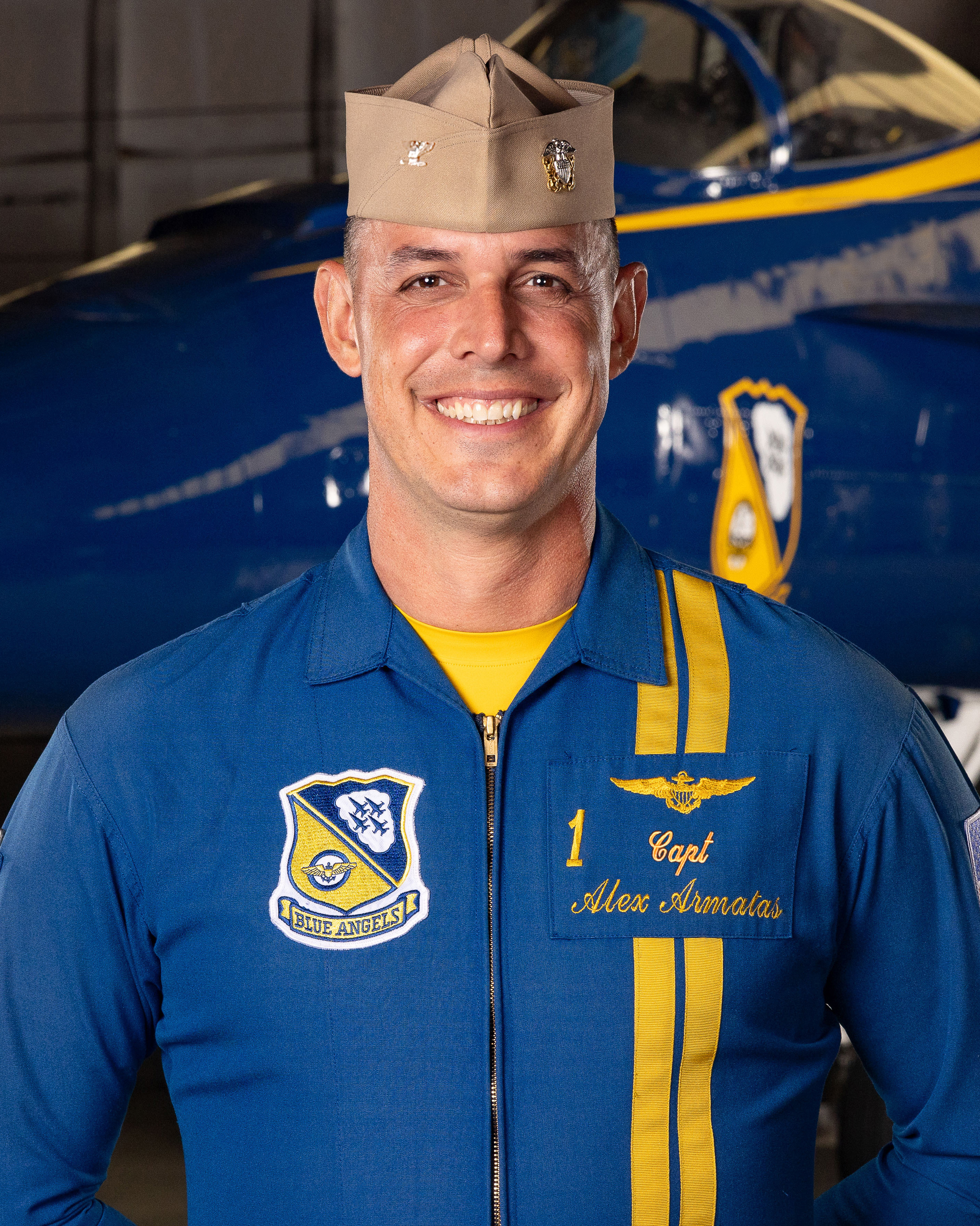
- Born: Auburn, New York, U.S.
- Education: United States Naval Academy
- Spouse: Sandy Armatas
- Children: 4
- Military career
- Branch: United States Navy
- Service years: 1998–present
- Rank: Captain
- Nickname: "Scribe"
- Commands: Strike Fighter Squadron (VFA) 105 U.S. Navy Flight Demonstration Squadron “Blue Angels”
- Known for: Blue Angels demonstration pilot
- Awards: Four Navy Achievement Medals

Alexander P. Armatas is a naval aviator in the United States Navy. He is the former flight leader and commanding officer of the Blue Angels, an elite fighter jet flight demonstration squadron.

Armatas graduated from the United States Naval Academy in 2002 and was the commander of Strike Fighter Squadron 105, also known as the "Gunslingers". In 2022 he was named commander of the Blue Angels. His call sign is "Scribe".

== Early life ==
Alexander Armatas was born at Auburn Community Hospital in Auburn, New York, to Telemahos Armatas and Kathy Burke. He grew up in Skaneateles and completed his freshman and sophomore years at Jordan-Elbridge High School before moving to Skaneateles to complete high school.

== Career ==
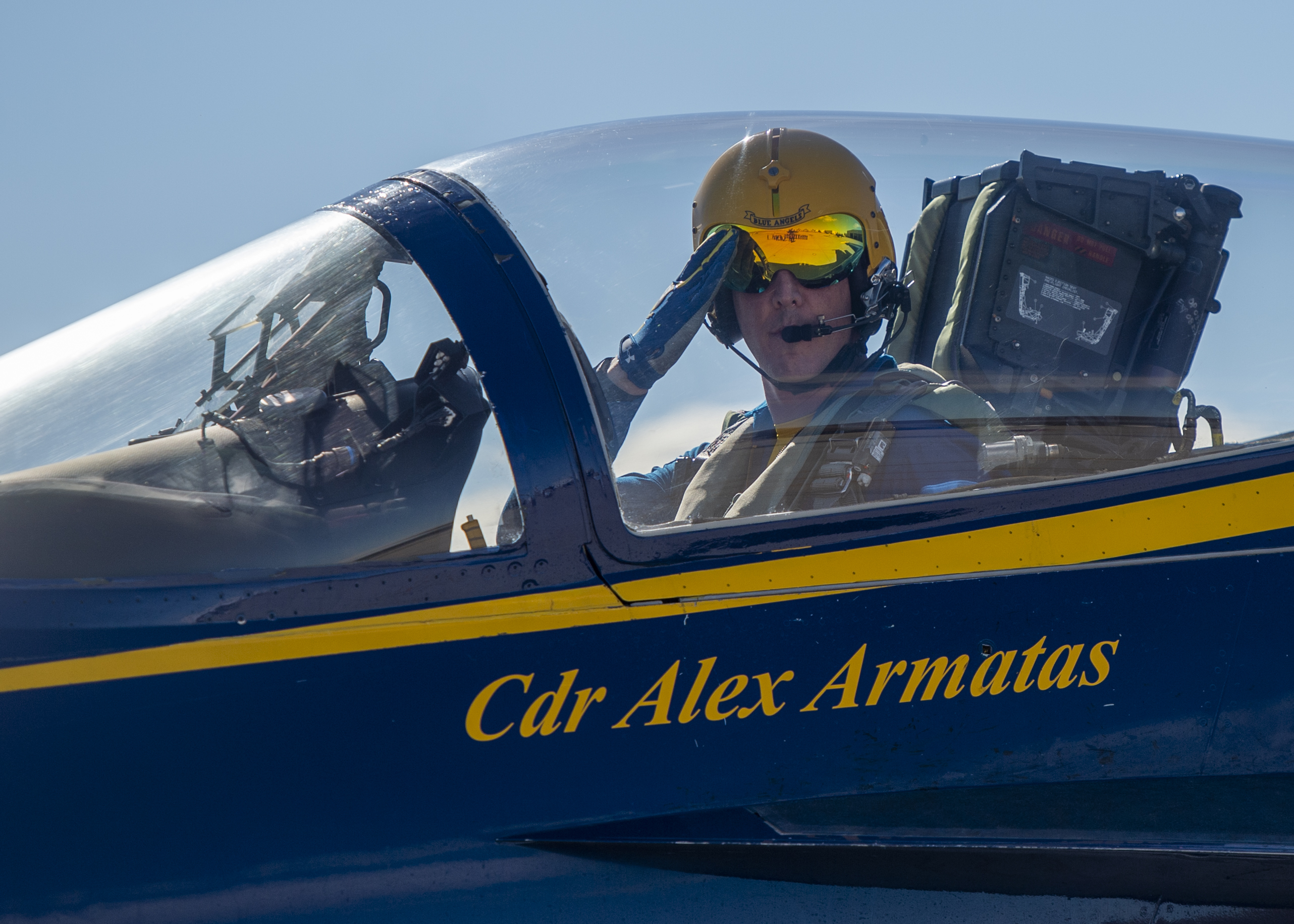
Armatas saluting before a training flight in 2023

Armatas was accepted into the United States Naval Academy in 1998, graduating in 2002 with a degree in aerospace engineering. In 2009, he graduated from the United States Navy Strike Fighter Tactics Instructor program (Top Gun). He joined Strike Fighter Squadron 122 ("Flying Eagles") at Naval Air Station Lemoore and became an instructor pilot.

Before joining the Blue Angels, Armatas completed more than 900 aircraft carrier landings and logged more than 4000 hours of flight time. In 2022 he was stationed at Naval Air Station Oceana as the commander of Strike Fighter Squadron 105 ("Gunslingers"). He has had six deployments in combat situations: Operation Iraqi Freedom in 2006, 2008 and 2012–13; Operation Inherent Resolve in 2015; and Operation Freedom's Sentinel in 2020–21. Armatas has been awarded the Meritorious Service Medal, four Strike/Flight Air Medals, five Commendation Medals, the Achievement Medal, and personal, unit and service awards.

=== Blue Angels ===
The Blue Angels flying in formation over Lake Michigan in 2023

From 2019 to 2022, the Blue Angels were led by Captain Brian Kesselring. In 2022 Armatas was named the commander of the Blue Angels to succeed Kesselring. Armatas's call sign is "Scribe", as the unofficial historian of his unit. He flies the number-one jet and leads a squadron of 150. The Blue Angels and Armatas fly in the F/A-18E and F/A-18F Super Hornet.

Armatas was featured in the 2024 documentary film The Blue Angels, which was filmed during the 2022 show season. Armatas is shown training to be the 2023 commander of the team.
