= Glen Zipper =

American film producer

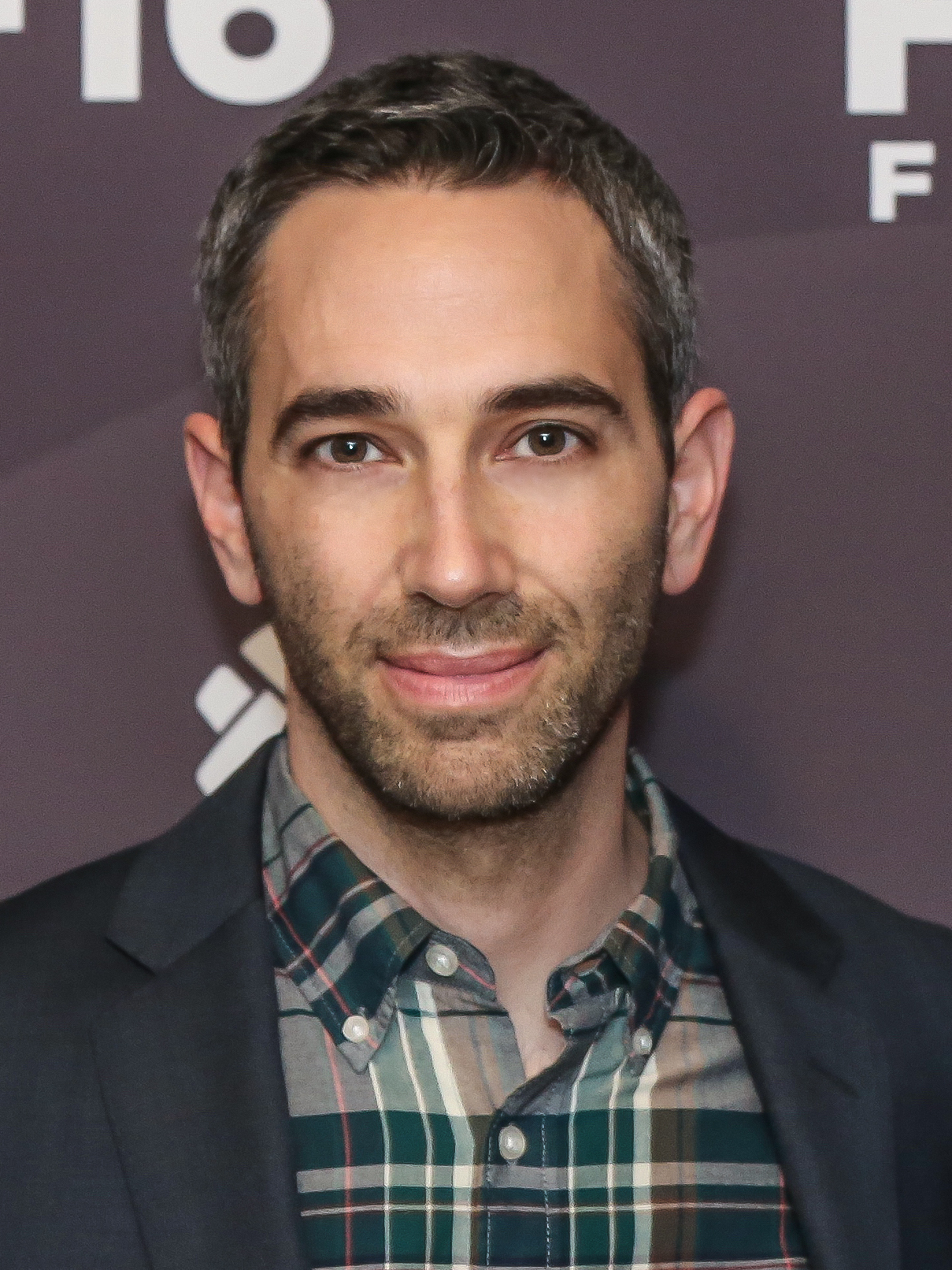
- Zipper in 2016
- Born: February 25, 1977 (age 49); New York City, U.S.
- Occupations: Producer, writer
- Years active: 2010–present
- Known for: The Blue Angels, John Candy: I Like Me, The Academy Award winning Undefeated, Dogs, Cat People, Challenger: The Final Flight, Tread, UFO, What's My Name: Muhammad Ali, Elvis Presley: The Searcher, Betting on Zero, Mike Judge Presents: Tales from the Tour Bus

Glen Zipper (born February 25, 1977) is an American writer, film producer and former New Jersey assistant state prosecutor.

== Personal life ==
Zipper graduated from Fort Lee High School, in Fort Lee, New Jersey, and received a degree in political science from the University of Wisconsin-Madison.

After college Glen attended Brooklyn Law School, before going on to become a prosecutor at the Hudson County Prosecutors Office in Hudson County, New Jersey.

== Film career ==
After serving as a prosecutor for three years, Zipper left New Jersey to embark on a career in filmmaking in Los Angeles.

In 2007, Zipper began his film career working for Nigel Sinclair and Guy East at Spitfire Pictures, which was subsequently acquired by Cyrte Investments and rebranded as Exclusive Media. After this acquisition, Spitfire was repurposed as the standalone documentary arm of Exclusive Media and Zipper was named Head of Documentary Features.

For Spitfire, Zipper was the executive producer of The Last Play at Shea about rock icon Billy Joel, and the Grammy winning Foo Fighters: Back and Forth and was an executive in charge of production on Martin Scorsese's Emmy winning George Harrison: Living in the Material World

In 2011, Glen founded Zipper Bros Films with his brother Ralph Zipper. Zipper Bros' first feature film was Undefeated, which premiered at the 2011 South by Southwest Film Festival and went on to win the 2012 Academy Award for Best Documentary Feature.

In 2015, Glen produced The Nightmare, a non-fiction horror film from director Rodney Ascher (Room 237). The Nightmare premiered at the 2015 Sundance Film Festival and has been reviewed as "the scariest movie of the decade" and "one of the scariest documentaries ever."

Additional credits for Zipper include Betting on Zero which was released in 2016, the Cinemax original series Mike Judge Presents: Tales from the Tour Bus which premiered its first season in 2017, and HBO's Elvis Presley: The Searcher which premiered in 2018.

In May 2018 it was announced that Zipper had entered into an overall deal with Bad Robot. Zipper's first collaboration with Bad Robot, Netflix's limited series Challenger: The Final Flight, which he developed and executive produced, was released in September 2020.

In October 2018 it was announced that Zipper developed and executive produced the Netflix Original documentary series Dogs. The series tracks six individual stories “celebrating the deep emotional bonds between people and their beloved four-legged friends” from countries including Syria, Japan, Costa Rica, Italy and the United States, and boasts a roster of award-winning directors including Academy Award winners Roger Ross Williams, Dan Lindsay and T. J. Martin (the directors responsible for Undefeated), Academy Award nominees Amy J. Berg and Heidi Ewing and Emmy Award winner Richard Hankin. Berg also serves as Zipper’s executive producing partner on the series.

In August 2020 Zipper won an Emmy for Outstanding Sports Documentary for executive producing What's My Name: Muhammad Ali.

In June 2021 it was announced that Dogs would return for Season 2 on Netflix on July 7, 2021, which would premiere on the same day as a new Netflix show about cats also developed and executive produced by Zipper—Cat People.

Zipper's second collaboration with Bad Robot, Showtime's limited documentary series UFO, was also announced in June 2021.

Since 2021, Zipper has continued producing documentary projects such as:

- The YouTube Effect, directed by Alex Winter.
- The Bond, produced in collaboration with Robert Downey Jr. and Susan Downey.
- CNN Films' true crime documentary Chowchilla.
- Disney's The Beach Boys.
- HBO's Elizabeth Taylor: The Lost Tapes. It premiered at the Cannes Film Festival on May 16, 2024.
- HBO's Emmy nominated Charlie Hustle & The Matter of Pete Rose.
- The IMAX feature documentary The Blue Angels, produced with J.J. Abrams and Glen Powell, which, before streaming on Amazon as an MGM Studios release, pulled in $1.3 million on just 255 domestic IMAX screens from limited showtimes in the large format exhibitor’s exclusive theatrical engagement.

Zipper's next documentary, John Candy: I Like Me, directed by Colin Hanks and produced in collaboration with Ryan Reynolds and the John Candy estate, premiered at the 2025 Toronto International Film Festival as the opening night film.

In late 2024, it was announced that Zipper would be expanding into scripted feature producing with Grand Gear, Godzilla Minus One director Takashi Yamazaki's first English-language film, to be produced with J.J. Abrams and Bad Robot. Sony Pictures landed the film after a competitive bidding war. No plot details have been revealed to date.

== Writing ==
In September 2018 it was announced that Stampede, the indie media company formed by former Warner Bros president Greg Silverman acquired movie rights to Devastation Class, an unpublished sci-fi novel co-written by Zipper and Elaine Mongeon. The novel follows an unlikely group of young cadets forced to mutiny aboard a revolutionary starship to save themselves from an annihilation force of invading aliens. When their escape transports them to a reality they don’t recognize and reveals unimaginably terrifying secrets, they must fight their way home to save not just everyone they love but also humanity itself. Standing in their way is an insurmountable enemy, a mystery eons in the making and the fabric of time and space itself.

In October 2019, Hulu released Swiped to Death, an original horror short co-written and produced by Zipper and Mongeon, about the potentially deadly perils of using dating apps, as part of their Huluween Film Festival.

== Philanthropy ==
Zipper currently sits on the advisory board of the Santa Monica-based charity k9 connection and is a noted advocate for homeless domestic animals.
