= All Things Must Pass: The Rise and Fall of Tower Records =

- Theatrical release poster
- Directed by: Colin Hanks
- Written by: Steven Leckart
- Produced by: Glen Zipper; Tim Comstock; Nicholas Ferrall; Sean Stuart; Shannon Rose
- Starring: Russ Solomon; Bruce Springsteen; Elton John; Dave Grohl; David Geffen
- Cinematography: Neil Lisk; Nicola Marsh; Bridger Nielson
- Edited by: Darrin Roberts
- Music by: Bill Sherman
- Distributed by: Gravitas Ventures (United States); Universal Pictures Home Entertainment (International)
- Release date: 19 March 2015
- Running time: 96 minutes
- Country: United States
- Language: English

All Things Must Pass: The Rise and Fall of Tower Records is a documentary directed by Colin Hanks on the rise and fall of the American record retailer Tower Records, completed and distributed in 2015.

== Content ==
The film is about the rise and demise of Tower Records, the retail "giant" that once advertised its East 4th Street and Broadway New York City location as "The Largest Record-Tape Store in the Known World". It also offers insights into the critical upheavals in the 21st-century recording industry.

== Production ==
The film's production reportedly took seven years and was completed in 2015 only thanks to a $92,000 round of Kickstarter funding. Hanks settled on the film's title after driving by an old Tower Records store and seeing a sign that had been put up by a former employee: "All Things Must Pass Thanks Sacramento". Moved by the sentiment, Hanks was reminded of George Harrison's 1970 triple album All Things Must Pass and asked the artist's widow, Olivia Harrison, for permission to use the title for his film. Hanks was also granted permission to play the album's title track over the end credits.

All Things Must Pass: The Rise and Fall of Tower Records premiered in the SXSW festival.

== Reviews ==
For The New York Times reviewer, the film "makes you appreciate anew the one-on-one social dimension lost in the music industry’s headlong switch to digital downloads". The Variety review claimed that "even viewers who have never owned, or even played, a vinyl record may be fascinated by the cautionary tale that Hanks spins beneath the surface of his sentimental celebration", while stating that the film's "primary audience likely will be baby boomers and Gen Xers who fondly recall the joys of discovery during shopping sprees in brick-and-mortar music stores".

Odie Henderson, reviewing for Rogerebert.com, wrote that All Things is "a documentary that inspires long, gauzy gazes back to the carefree, youthful past of viewers of a certain age", adding that "any movie that begins and ends with the sound of a phonograph needle hitting vinyl knows the audience sweet spot it’s aiming for, and for those folks, All Things Must Pass is a rousing success".

Other reviewers commented that while Solomon and Tower had been sometimes criticized, along with other big retailers, of putting independent and small music-retailers out of business, no such criticism appears in the film, which for Hanks was, as he stated, "a chance to revisit a time and experience that molded" him.

Review aggregator Rotten Tomatoes indicated an average rating of 6.94/10 among critics.

== See also ==
- Vinyl revival
- Virgin Megastores
- The Last Blockbuster
