= Tread =

Tread may refer to:

== Arts and media ==
- Tread (film), a 2019 American documentary film about Marvin Heemeyer
- Tread (Transformers)
- Tread, a character in the novel series Transformers: The Veiled Threat
- Tread rap, subgenre of trap that began in Philadelphia in the mid-2010s
- Tread, a 2021 album by British record producer Ross from Friends

== Other uses ==
- Shoe tread, pattern on the bottom of a shoe
- Stair tread, horizontal portion of a set of stairs on which a person walks
- Tire tread, patterned outer surface of a tyre that makes contact with the road
- Tread (river terrace), the level section of a river terrace
- Continuous track, a system of vehicle propulsion used in tracked vehicles
- Wheel tread, an old name for the wheel track
