= Shane Reid =

American film editor

- Born: U.S.
- Occupation: Film editor

Shane Reid is an American film editor.

== Career ==
In November 2025, Reid had been hired to direct his first feature film, a remake of Thunderbolt and Lightfoot for Amazon MGM Studios.

== Selected filmography ==
Year	Film	Director
2020	I'm on Fire	Michael Spiccia
2021	Dubai Presents: A Five-Star Mission	Craig Gillespie
2021	Previous Owner	Sam Pilling
2024	Ghostbusters: Frozen Empire	Gil Kenan
2024	Deadpool & Wolverine	Shawn Levy
2024	Saturday Night	Jason Reitman
2025	John Candy: I Like Me	Colin Hanks
