= E. A. Hanks =

American writer and journalist (born 1982)

- Born: Elizabeth Anne Hanks; May 17, 1982 (age 44); Burbank, California, US
- Other name: Elizabeth Hanks
- Education: Vassar College
- Occupations: Writer; Journalist
- Father: Tom Hanks
- Relatives: Colin Hanks (brother); Chet Hanks (half-brother); Rita Wilson (stepmother); Jim Hanks (uncle); Larry Hanks (uncle)
- Website: eahanks.com

Elizabeth Anne Hanks (born May 17, 1982) is an American writer and journalist. She has written for publications including Vanity Fair and The Huffington Post, and in 2025 she released her memoir, The 10: A Memoir of Family and the Open Road.

== Early life ==
Hanks was born in Burbank to actors Tom Hanks and Susan Dillingham, who was also known by the stage name Samantha Lewes. (Note: Sources variously refer to her using both names. This article uses her birth name, Dillingham, for consistency.) After the couple's separation, their two children, Elizabeth and her older brother, Colin, lived with their mother. When the divorce was finalized in 1987, Dillingham was given primary custody. She moved with the children to Sacramento, initially without their father's knowledge. Elizabeth spent "some weekends and most school holidays" with her father, who still lived in Los Angeles. She traveled with him to the sets of several of his films, including to the set of Forrest Gump (1994), in which she had a brief non-speaking role as "School bus girl".

Hanks has described her childhood as being "filled with confusion, violence, deprivation, and love", and has said that she experienced "a level of neglect" by her mother. Dillingham struggled with substance abuse, including cocaine addiction, and undiagnosed mental health conditions that led to symptoms of paranoia and delusion.

During Hanks's childhood, her father, Tom, made "an extended and ongoing effort to get custody" of her, but was unable to do so without proof of physical violence against her by Dillingham. When Hanks was 14, following an incident in which Dillingham did become physically violent towards her, primary custody of Hanks was transferred to her father. She moved to Los Angeles to live with him, his wife Rita Wilson, and their two sons Chester and Truman. Hanks has commented on her close relationship with Wilson, telling People magazine that "Rita's not really a stepmother, she's my other mother"; she describes Chester and Truman as her "younger brothers" rather than "half brothers".

In December 2000, Dillingham was diagnosed with lung cancer and secondary bone cancer. She died in March 2002 at the age of 49.

Hanks attended The Archer School for Girls, graduating in 2001. After studying for a year at the University of St Andrews in Scotland, she graduated from Vassar College in 2005, with a degree in English.

== Career ==
Following her college graduation, Hanks moved to New York City, where she worked as an editorial assistant and staff writer at Vanity Fair. From 2007, Hanks was a night editor covering politics for The Huffington Post, before moving to Glamour in 2008 to cover John McCain's presidential campaign. After "years of ... churning out copy", Hanks experienced burnout; following an unsuccessful attempt to branch out into children's literature, she moved back to Los Angeles in 2012, and took a series of jobs outside of writing. She later returned to journalism, and has contributed to publications including Time, The Guardian, The Washington Post and The New York Times; she also branched out into screenwriting, and had "a job writing jokes for a TV show".

In 2021, Hanks's essay "Notes on Native Daughters" was one of the commentaries published alongside the screenplay for Lady Bird by Greta Gerwig, as the sixth book in the A24 Films Screenplay Collection.

=== The 10 ===
In 2025, Hanks published her memoir, The 10: A Memoir of Family and the Open Road, which documents Hanks's 2019 solo road trip from Los Angeles to Palatka, Florida—retracing a drive she took with her mother in 1996—along Interstate 10, after which the book is named. The 10 combines a travelog, describing Hanks's journey through the Southern United States and considering ideas of place, with an exploration of her "tumultuous childhood" and her relationship with her "emotionally volatile" mother.

The memoir received generally positive reviews. In a review for the San Francisco Chronicle, Lily Janiak criticized the framing of the book; she described the use of the road trip as a means to explore Hanks's childhood and familial traumas as "arbitrary", and concluded that the book lacked coherence. However, writing for The Washington Post, Priscilla Gilman described The 10 as being "vibrantly alive with vulnerability and courageous honesty". Kirkus Reviews complimented the book's "heartfelt, yearning narrative", while author Adrienne Brodeur described it as a "masterful blend of humor, heartache, and unforgettable landscapes".

== Personal life ==
Hanks lives in Los Angeles with her partner. In a 2025 episode of the podcast Thank You for Coming Out, Hanks described herself as bisexual. During her childhood, Hanks shared her mother's "born-again Christian" faith, but as an adult she has described herself as an atheist.

== Selected publications ==
- Hanks, E. A. (2021). "Notes on Native Daughters" [essay]. Lady Bird Screenplay Book. By Gerwig, Greta. New York City: A24 Films. pp. 187–197. ISBN 978-1-733992-09-1.
- Hanks, E. A. (April 8, 2025). The 10: A Memoir of Family and the Open Road. New York City: Gallery Books (Simon & Schuster). ISBN 978-1-9821-3129-6.
