= Robert Denno =

American entomologist (1945–2008)

- Born: Robert F. Denno; 1945; New York City, US
- Died: 2008 (aged 67–68)

Academic background
- Education: University of California, Davis; Rutgers University

Academic work
- Discipline: Entomology
- Institutions: University of Maryland, College Park
- Doctoral students: Lawrence Hanks
- Main interests: Wing polymorphism
- Notable works: Insect life history patterns

Robert F. Denno (1945–2008) was an influential insect ecologist. He published more than 130 research papers that helped advance the study of plant–insect interactions, interspecific competition, predator prey interactions and food web dynamics. He studied the ecology of sap-feeding insects, both in natural and cultivated settings. His study of wing polymorphism expanded into the fields of life history evolution (e.g., Denno and Dingle 1981), plant and herbivore interactions (e.g., Denno and McClure 1983), community ecology (e.g., Denno et al. 1996), and many aspects of predator ecology, reviewed recently in Denno et al. (2005).

His personal worldwide collection of butterflies numbered over 36,000 specimens. His butterfly collection was donated, at least in part, to the McGuire Center for Lepidoptera and Biodiversity.

Following a postdoctoral appointment at Rutgers University from 1974 to 1976, Denno moved to the University of Maryland, College Park in 1976. He advanced to associate professor in 1979 and professor in 1985 in the Entomology Department. While at College Park, one of his doctoral students was Lawrence Hanks.

== Publications ==
- Denno R. F. 1975. "Wing polymorphism in salt marsh inhabiting Fulgoroidea". Journal of the New York Entomological Society. 83: 253–254.
- Denno R. F., Dingle H., editors 1981. Insect life history patterns: habitat and geographic variation. Springer-Verlag. New York City, US.
- Denno R. F., Fagan W. F. 2003. "Might nitrogen limitation promote omnivory among carnivorous arthropods". Ecology. 84: 2522–2531.
- Denno R. F., McClure M. S., editors 1983. Variable plants and herbivores in natural and managed systems. Academic Press. New York City, US.
- Denno R. F., Perfect T. J., editors 1994. Planthoppers: their ecology and management. Chapman and Hall. New York City, US.
- Denno R. F., Roderick G. K. 1990. "Population biology of planthoppers". Annual Review of Entomology. 35: 489–520. Find this article online
- Denno R. F., Finke D. L., Langellotto G. A., 2005. "Direct and indirect effects of vegetation structure and habitat complexity on predator–prey and predator–predator interactions". Pages 211–239 in Barbosa P., Castellanos I., editors Ecology of predator–prey interactions. Oxford University Press. New York City, US.
- Denno R. F., McClure M. S., Ott J. R. 1995. "Interspecific interactions in phytophagous insects: competition revisited and resurrected". Annual Review of Entomology. 40: 297–331.
- Huberty A. F., Denno R. F. 2004. "Plant water stress and its consequences for herbivorous insects: a new synthesis". Ecology. 85: 1383–1398.
