= White Boy Summer =

2021 single by Chet Hanks

Single by Chet Hanx
- Released: April 13, 2021
- Genre: Hip hop
- Length: 2:07
- Songwriter: Chet Hanx

Chet Hanx singles chronology
"White Boy Summer" (2021)	"Damn!" (2021)

Music video
- Chet Hanx - White Boy Summer (Official Music Video) on YouTube

"White Boy Summer" is a song by Chet Hanks (under the alias of Chet Hanx) released in 2021. Prior to the release of the song, Hanx posted several Instagram videos declaring that summer 2021 would be a "white boy summer," and offered some advice to white men on fashion and behavior. The title is a reference to Megan Thee Stallion's song "Hot Girl Summer".

== Music video ==
The video shows him with scantily clad women, marijuana, and a Jamaican flag.

== Controversies and criticism ==
The concept has been criticized for possible ties to cultural appropriation. The song and its video have been the subject of online discourse.

Some extremists also used "White Boy Summer" as their reaction to oppose political events, such as the Black Lives Matter protests. They used the term to refer to a utopia or war against their enemies. Among them was the white nationalist commentator Nick Fuentes, who used it as a slogan to disrupt an event hosted by the Conservative Political Action Conference with his followers. Hanks has condemned the phrase's hijacking by extremists, and said it was meant "to be fun, playful and a celebration of fly white boys who love beautiful queens of every race".
