= Bill Gerber =

American film and television producer (born 1957)

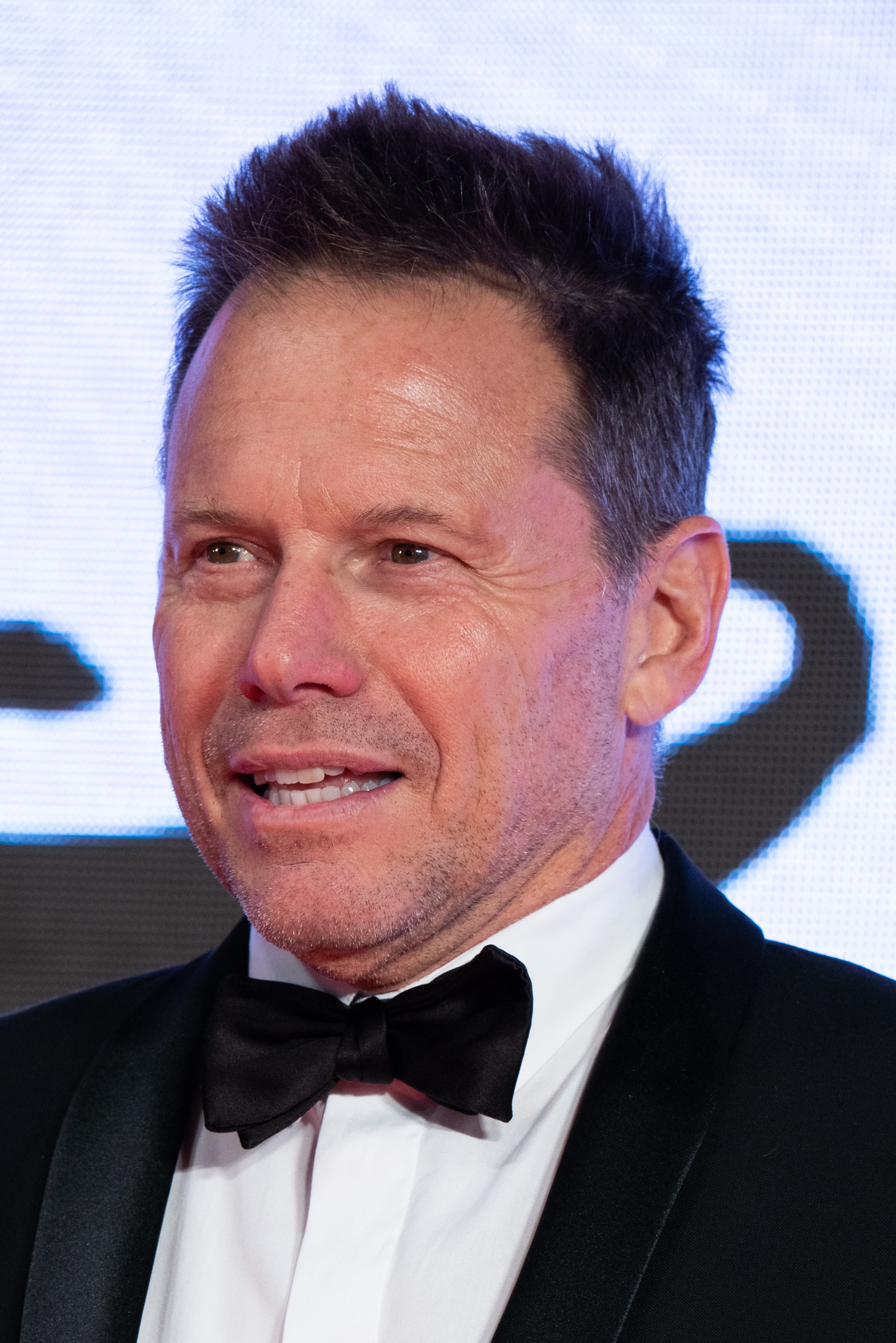
- Gerber in 2019
- Born: April 30, 1957 (age 68); United States
- Occupation: Film producer

Bill Gerber (born April 30, 1957) is an American film and television producer. He was President of Production at Warner Bros. Pictures, before establishing an existing and long-standing producing deal with the studio. He is known for producing A Star Is Born (2018), Gran Torino (2008), A Very Long Engagement (2004), and Grudge Match (2013). As an executive, Gerber supervised a significant number of films which received 47 Academy Award nominations and 14 Academy Award wins. The films include Good Fellas (1990), Reversal of Fortune (1990), JFK (1991), Unforgiven (1992), Heat (1995), Twister (1996), L.A. Confidential (1997), You've Got Mail (1998), Three Kings (1999), The Iron Giant (1999), The Perfect Storm (2000), and the Harry Potter series.

Before joining Warner Bros., Gerber was a partner at Lookout Management, a premiere management company which has represented classic rock artists such as Neil Young, Joni Mitchell, Tom Petty, The Cars, and Devo. While at Lookout Management, Gerber signed Heaven 17, ABC, Scritti Politti, and Paul Reubens. Gerber also worked on various music videos and even appeared in the Andy Warhol directed music video "Hello Again".

In 2019, Gerber received an Oscar nomination for Best Picture for A Star Is Born; he also received a Golden Globe nomination for it. In 2002, he received an Emmy nomination for Outstanding Made for Television Movie for James Dean. James Franco was nominated for the Golden Globe Award for Best Actor – Miniseries or Television Film and took home the award at the 58th Golden Globe Awards . Gerber also received a Golden Globe nomination for Best Foreign Language Film for A Very Long Engagement in 2005. In 2020, he received a Sports Emmy for the HBO documentary series, What's My Name: Muhammad Ali. Most recently, he produced Elizabeth Taylor: The Lost Tapes which debuted at the Cannes Film Festival in May 2024.

Aside from working in entertainment, Gerber has strong rooted interests in sustainability, fitness, and technology. In 2007, he founded Sustainable Holdings with Kevin Wall combining their passions for the environment and green business. Gerber is an adviser to multiple companies such as Events.com, AnyQuestion, ACTV8me, and Dreamscape. Gerber is an investor in a number of restaurants and food brands including Gracias Madre, Gjusta, and Barnana.

== Filmography ==
He was a producer in all films unless otherwise noted.

=== Film ===
Year	Film	Credit
2000	Get Carter	Executive producer
2001	American Outlaws	
2002	Queen of the Damned	Executive producer
2002	Juwanna Mann	
2003	What a Girl Wants	
2003	The In-Laws	
2003	Grind	
2004	A Very Long Engagement	Executive producer
2005	The Dukes of Hazzard	
2006	Beerfest	
2008	Private Valentine: Blonde & Dangerous	
2008	Gran Torino	
2012	The Babymakers	Co-executive producer
2013	Grudge Match	
2016	The Last Face	
2017	Just Getting Started	
2018	Action Point	
2018	A Star Is Born	
2024	Elizabeth Taylor: The Lost Tapes	
TBA	Liar's Poker	
TBA	The Six Billion Dollar Man	

As an actor

Year	Film	Role
1977	Raid on Entebbe (TV)	Nathan Darin
2000	The Independent	Dennis
2016	The Last Face	UN Representative

Thanks

Year	Film	Role
2007	Then She Found Me	Special thanks
2017	Guns Guitars and a Badge..	Special thanks

=== Television ===
Year	Title	Credit	Notes
2001	James Dean	Executive producer	Television film
2007	The Dukes of Hazzard: The Beginning		Television film
2018	Beerfest: Thirst for Victory	Executive producer	Television film
