= The Last Blockbuster =

2020 documentary film

- Poster
- Directed by: Taylor Morden
- Written by: Zeke Kamm
- Produced by: Zeke Kamm
- Starring: Sandi Harding; Lloyd Kaufman; Jamie Kennedy; Kevin Smith; Adam Brody; Samm Levine; Ron Funches; Paul Scheer; Doug Benson; James Arnold Taylor; Brian Posehn; Greg Camp; Ione Skye
- Narrated by: Lauren Lapkus
- Edited by: Tim Skousen
- Production companies: Popmotion Pictures; September Club
- Distributed by: 1091 Pictures
- Release date: December 15, 2020
- Running time: 86 minutes
- Country: United States
- Language: English

The Last Blockbuster is a 2020 documentary film about Blockbuster LLC's last store, located in Bend, Oregon. It was released on December 15, 2020, by 1091 Pictures.

== Synopsis ==
The documentary tells the story of the rise and fall of Blockbuster Video, a video rental business that was popular during the 1990s. The documentary explores how Blockbuster put independent video rental stores out of business by striking revenue-share deals with film studios (allowing Blockbuster to negotiate lower prices in exchange for a cut of the rental fees), and how Blockbuster itself collapsed as a result of poor management and the 2008 financial crisis. The film also documents the business model and continued survival of the last remaining Blockbuster store, in Bend, Oregon.

== Cast ==
The film follows Sandi Harding, the general manager of the last store over the course of a number of years. Actor and Clerks director Kevin Smith discusses the kind of businesses that Blockbuster put out of business and how they inspired his debut film. Other interviewees include Adam Brody, Samm Levine, Ron Funches, Paul Scheer, Doug Benson, James Arnold Taylor, Jamie Kennedy, and Brian Posehn.

== Reception ==
On Rotten Tomatoes, the film has an approval rating of 71% based on 28 reviews, with an average rating of 7.3/10. The site's consensus reads, "Slight but entertaining, The Last Blockbuster doesn't add much to the saga of the fallen video rental store, but should satisfy nostalgic customers in the mood for a quick diversion." On Metacritic, the film has a weighted average score of 59 out of 100, based on 4 critics, indicating "mixed or average" reviews.

== See also ==
- All Things Must Pass: The Rise and Fall of Tower Records, a 2015 documentary
