= Larry Hanks =

American entomologist

- Born: Lawrence Michael Hanks; 1953 (age 72–73); Alameda County, California, U.S.
- Occupations: Entomologist; professor
- Years active: 1978–present
- Relatives: Tom Hanks (brother); Jim Hanks (brother); Colin Hanks (nephew); E. A. Hanks (niece); Chet Hanks (nephew); Rita Wilson (sister-in-law)
- Scientific career
- Education: University of Maryland (PhD, 1991); University of Nevada (MS, 1982); UC Davis (BS, 1978)
- Awards: 2000 National Recognition Award in Urban Entomology from the Entomological Society of America (2000)
- Fields: Entomology
- Workplaces: University of Illinois at Urbana-Champaign
- Thesis: Factors influencing the distribution and abundance of the white peach scale, Pseudaulacaspis pentagona (Targioni-Tozzetti) (Homoptera:Diaspididae): Host plants and natural enemies (1991)
- Doctoral advisor: Robert Denno

Lawrence Michael Hanks (born 1953) is an American entomologist and retired professor formerly teaching in the Department of Entomology at the University of Illinois at Urbana-Champaign.

== Education and career ==
Hanks received his B.S. from the University of California, Davis in 1978, his M.S. from the University of Nevada, Reno in 1982, and his Ph.D. from the University of Maryland, College Park in 1991. His Ph.D. supervisor was Robert Denno. As a graduate student, he became curious as to why trees in woodland settings were almost free of a pest that was infecting numerous trees in urban landscapes. He subsequently published a study on the subject with Clifford Sadof of Purdue University, which indicated that woodlands contained natural organisms that preyed on the tree pests. He completed his post-doctorate at the University of California, Riverside, where he studied ways to combat the effects of a pest borer beetle on eucalyptus trees. He joined the University of Illinois at Urbana-Champaign's faculty in 1996 as an assistant professor, and became an associate professor there in 2003 and a full professor in 2008.

== Personal life ==
He is the eldest brother of actors Tom Hanks and Jim Hanks.
