= What's My Name: Muhammad Ali =

2019 American documentary film

- Directed by: Antoine Fuqua
- Written by: Steven Leckart
- Produced by: Glen Zipper; Sean Stuart; Maverick Carter; Maren Domzalski; Antoine Fuqua; Bill Gerber; Noor Haydar; LeBron James; Kat Samick
- Starring: Muhammad Ali
- Cinematography: Maz Makhani
- Edited by: Jake Pushinsky
- Music by: Marcelo Zarvos
- Production companies: Sutter Road Picture Company; Fuqua Films; SpringHill Entertainment
- Distributed by: HBO
- Release dates: April 28, 2019 (Tribeca); May 14, 2019 (HBO)
- Running time: Part one: 83 minutes, Part two: 79 minutes
- Country: United States
- Language: English

What's My Name: Muhammad Ali is a 2019 documentary film directed by Antoine Fuqua and written by Steven Leckart. The film is produced by Glen Zipper, Sean Stuart, Maverick Carter, Maren Domzalski, Antoine Fuqua, Bill Gerber, Noor Haydar, LeBron James and Kat Samick under the banner of SpringHill Entertainment and Sutter Road Picture Company and is distributed by HBO. The film is based on the life of Muhammad Ali.

== Cast ==
- Muhammad Ali as himself (archived footage)

== Music ==
The instrumental score was composed by Marcelo Zarvos and released on CD as "Muhammad Ali (Original Motion Picture Soundtrack)". In addition, the movie contains the following songs and spoken word pieces, which are not included on the soundtrack album:

- "We're a Winner" - The Impressions
- "Kansas City" - Wilbert Harrison
- "The Star-Spangled Banner" - Muhammad Ali
- "It's All Right" - The Impressions
- "Baby I’ve Got It" - King George & The Fabulous Souls
- "The Gang’s All Here" - Cassius Clay
- "Shake" - Sam Cooke
- "Fortunate Son" - John Fogerty
- "We Came In Chains" - Muhammad Ali
- "Hold On, I'm Comin'" - Sam & Dave
- "Get Up (I Feel Like Being a) Sex Machine" - James Brown
- "Stand By Me" - Cassius Clay
- "The Payback" - James Brown
- "Outa-Space" - Billy Preston
- "I’m A Man" - Spencer Davis Group
- "My Way" - Joe Frazier
- "Can I Change My Mind" - Joe Frazier
- "It's Your Thing" - The Isley Brothers
- "Make It Funky" - James Brown
- "Roots" - Willie Bobo
- "Jungle Boogie" - Kool & The Gang
- "Spirit Of The Boogie" - Kool & The Gang
- "Breakthrough" - Isaac Hayes
- "Shadow Dancing" - Andy Gibb
- "Evolution" - Magnum

== Reception ==
Caryn James of The Hollywood Reporter wrote, "With montages of Ali meeting the Pope and Nelson Mandela, and newspaper headlines about donations to help fight poverty in Africa, What's My Name is undeniably an exercise in image-burnishing (not that Ali's already heroic image needs it). But this smartly crafted film holds you all the way."

Brian Tallerico of RogerEbert.com wrote, "[the film] offers something even for those of us who know a great deal about the legendary athlete and civil rights leader by doing something incredibly simple: letting Ali tell his own story."

Nick Schager of Variety wrote, "At almost three hours, 'What's My Name' never bogs down in repetitiveness or pedantry, instead operating almost as swiftly and forcefully as the icon himself. "
