= Sly (film) =

- Promotional release poster
- Directed by: Thom Zimny
- Produced by: Sean Stuart
- Starring: Sylvester Stallone
- Cinematography: Justin Kane
- Edited by: Annie Salsich
- Music by: Tyler Strickland
- Production company: Netflix
- Distributed by: Netflix
- Release dates: September 16, 2023 (TIFF); November 3, 2023 (Netflix)
- Running time: 95 minutes
- Country: United States
- Language: English

Sly is a 2023 American documentary film about the life and legacy of Sylvester Stallone, directed by Thom Zimny. It premiered at the 2023 Toronto International Film Festival, and was released on Netflix on November 3, 2023.

== Plot ==
The film explores Sylvester Stallone's life and nearly 50-year career, from rough childhood in Manhattan to struggling actor to action filmmaker and star of Hollywood franchises including Rocky and Rambo. It includes footage of Stallone's pursuit of filmmaking, scenes from his films, photos from his childhood, and interviews with Arnold Schwarzenegger, Frank Stallone, Henry Winkler, Talia Shire, John Herzfeld, Wesley Morris, and Quentin Tarantino.

== Production ==
=== Development ===
The film was announced on June 30, 2023. It is produced by Sean Stuart and executive produced by Stallone, Braden Aftergood, Bill Zanker, Sam Delcanto, Jon Beyer, Tom Forman, and Jenny Daly.

== Release ==
=== Streaming ===
The film premiered at the Toronto International Film Festival as the closing night film on September 16, 2023, and was released on Netflix on November 3, 2023.

== Reception ==
=== Critical response ===
On the review aggregator website Rotten Tomatoes, 81% of 53 critics' reviews are positive, with an average rating of 6.4/10. The website's consensus reads: "A thoroughly watchable testament to Sylvester Stallone's longevity, Sly might pull its punches, but it's consistently engaging regardless." Metacritic, which uses a weighted average, assigned the film a score of 62 out of 100, based on 17 critics, indicating "generally favorable" reviews.
