= Marvin Heemeyer =

American known for bulldozer rampage (1951–2004)

- Born: October 28, 1951; Castlewood, South Dakota, U.S.
- Died: June 4, 2004 (aged 52); Granby, Colorado, U.S.
- Cause of death: Self-inflicted gunshot wound to the head
- Occupations: Welder; automobile repair shop owner
- Known for: "Killdozer" rampage

Marvin John Heemeyer (October 28, 1951 – June 4, 2004) was an American welder and automobile repair shop owner who, in an act of revenge, demolished numerous buildings with a modified bulldozer in Granby, Colorado, in June 2004. Heemeyer's machine was posthumously labeled by some members of the media and later adopted by some of Heemeyer's supporters as the "Killdozer".

Over the 12 years prior to the attack, Heemeyer became embroiled in disputes with Granby town officials, neighbors of his muffler shop, the local press, and other citizens of Granby, including over zoning rules which Heemeyer believed impaired his muffler repair shop's business. Motivated by his frustration, Heemeyer began secretly armoring a Komatsu D355A bulldozer with layers of steel and concrete in 2002 with the intent of using it for destructive purposes.

On June 4, 2004, Heemeyer used the bulldozer in a vehicle-ramming attack to demolish the Granby town hall, the house of a former mayor, and several other buildings. He committed suicide after the bulldozer became stuck in the debris of a hardware store he was destroying. No one else was hurt.

== Background and personal life ==
Marvin Heemeyer was born on October 28, 1951, on a dairy farm in South Dakota. Heemeyer never married and remained childless.

In 1974, Heemeyer moved to Colorado because he was stationed at Lowry Air Force Base. He lived in Boulder and operated muffler repair shops around Denver. In 1989, he moved to Grand Lake, about 16 miles (26 km) away from Granby. His friends said that he had no relatives in the Granby–Grand Lake area.

Heemeyer enjoyed taking snowmobile trips with friends. He led a rescue effort on one such trip after a friend became trapped in a small avalanche. He was also a doomsday prepper.

Heemeyer was strongly in favor of gambling legalization and campaigned for the cause on several occasions. At one point, he began disseminating a newspaper of his own on the issue, as he believed the local newspapers were biased against this cause. In 1994, a measure was proposed that would have legalized gambling in Grand Lake and Heemeyer was so passionate about the cause that he nearly came to blows with a local reporter who was opposed to the proposal.

John Bauldree, a friend of Heemeyer's, said that he was a likable person. Heemeyer's brother Ken stated that he "would bend over backwards for anyone." While many people described Heemeyer as an affable person, local resident Christie Baker claimed that she was told that Heemeyer threatened her husband after he refused to pay for a disputed muffler repair. Baker said her husband later paid Heemeyer $124.

== Dispute ==
=== Zoning and sewage dispute ===
In 1992, Heemeyer purchased two acres (0.8 ha) of land for $42,000 (equivalent to $96,360 in 2025) at auction with plans to lease the property to a friend who intended to build an auto repair shop on the site. Present at the auction was Cody Docheff, whose family had previously owned the property. Heemeyer claimed that Docheff had berated him for several minutes afterward out of anger towards losing the property; however, no other party present recalled any such interaction.

The property had a rudimentary sewage storage solution in the form of a buried cement mixer left by the previous owners. The cost to update the sewer system would be nearly double the $42,000 Heemeyer paid for the property.

City officials told Heemeyer that putting in a septic tank was a less expensive alternative, but he rejected both options and said that the government not paying for the sewage line hookup was "extortion by government fiat". Despite these setbacks, he did not withdraw his annexation request and subsequently became part of the sewer district.

By 1993, Heemeyer had abandoned plans to rent the property to a friend and instead opened a muffler repair shop on the grounds. According to Heemeyer, his friend had lost interest in the property in around April 1992 because of oil spills and environmental issues.

=== Opposition to sell to concrete plant ===
In 1997, the Docheff family planned to expand their business to include a concrete batch plant and were buying up the land around their current lot, hoping to lease the remaining 23 parcels to small manufacturers. They were informed by the town planning commission that they needed a "Planned Development Overlay District" permit to construct the plant as part of their Mountain Park Concrete development. The commission also suggested that the Docheff family ask if they could purchase Heemeyer's plot to keep the plant away from the hotels and businesses on Route 40.

Heemeyer asked for $250,000 (equivalent to $501,399 in 2025) for his property, but later claimed he had had the lot reappraised and asked for an additional $125,000 (equivalent to $250,700 in 2025). The Docheffs managed to collect $350,000 (equivalent to $701,959 in 2025), but according to Susan Docheff, Heemeyer again upped his asking price, claiming he had the property appraised again at a higher value, this time asking for $450,000 (equivalent to $902,519 in 2025). This negotiation happened before the rezoning proposal had a public hearing at town hall.

Heemeyer launched a public campaign against the planned concrete plant. His campaign was initially successful, with members of the public concerned about potential environmental impacts packing into hearings on the construction proposals. The Docheffs addressed these concerns by promising to install additional measures against dust and noise and presented miniatures of the plant to concerned citizens. Opposition to the proposal dwindled, and the plan was set to move forward again. In November 2000, Heemeyer filed a lawsuit to block the project.

By January 9, 2001, Heemeyer had lost most of his allies in opposition to the concrete plant, and city officials almost unanimously approved its construction. This made the final approval by Granby's zoning commission and trustees in April a formality.

Heemeyer tried to appeal the decision, claiming the construction blocked access to his shop. He also complained to the Environmental Protection Agency; this resulted in the Docheff family having a professional noise analysis done.

In June 2001, Joe Docheff made Heemeyer an offer over the phone whereby if Heemeyer dropped the lawsuit, they would provide him an easement to connect a sewer line to the new concrete plant free of charge; Heemeyer simply hung up. Around this time, the buried concrete truck barrel that served as Heemeyer's sewage hole filled up. Heemeyer responded by pumping his sewage with a gasoline pump into the irrigation ditch that ran behind his property. Heemeyer also attempted to illegally connect to a neighbor's sewer line, but was caught and the incident reported to the sanitation district. At this point, the sewer district started enforcing the legal requirement to have a sewer hookup or a septic tank and fined Heemeyer $2,500 (equivalent to $4,546 in 2025) for it and other city code violations at his business in July 2001, nine years after he was required to have installed either.

== Planning the rampage ==
=== Bulldozer repurposing and construction ===
After the lawsuit against the town was dismissed in April 2002, Heemeyer blamed the failure on his lawyer and demanded a refund. Knowing the zoning decision was now final, he traveled to California, bought a Komatsu Limited D355A bulldozer in an auction for $16,000 (equivalent to $28,640 in 2025) and had it shipped to Granby in July 2002. He kept it outside of his business with a "For Sale" sign on it and tried to auction it, but few paid it any mind.

In October 2002, he announced the closure of the muffler repair business, putting almost all of the inventory up for sale. When the bulldozer failed to sell, he saw it as a sign from God to use the machine to enact vengeance on the town of Granby. He sold his property for $400,000 (equivalent to $716,004 in 2025)—around ten times the original purchase price—to a waste disposal company in October 2003 and took out a lease for half the building he had previously owned until he had "finished some work." Within a day of the purchase closing, the new owners had completed water and sewer connections.

Heemeyer planned the repurposing of the bulldozer on his Grand Lake home computer.

He erected a wall to separate his space from the rest of the building and changed the locks. While no one else could see him, he worked on the bulldozer, illegally constructing living quarters to avoid having to return to his home in Grand Lake, which he saw as a waste of time that could be spent on the dozer. During this period, he dumped his sewage into the same irrigation ditch he had been caught dumping into several months earlier.

"It is interesting to observe that I was never caught", Heemeyer wrote. "This was a part-time project over a 1½-year time period." He was surprised that several men, who had visited the shed late the previous year, had not noticed the modified bulldozer "especially with the 2,000-pound [910 kg] lift fully exposed ... somehow their vision was clouded".

During this period, Heemeyer repeatedly mentioned the bulldozer to friends and associates, as well as his intention to use it for destructive purposes.

The bulldozer was a modified Komatsu D355A, which he referred to in audio recordings as the "MK Tank" (or "Marv's Komatsu Tank"), fitted with makeshift composite armor plating covering the cabin, engine, and parts of the tracks. Three external explosions and more than 200 rounds of ammunition fired at the bulldozer had no effect on it.

For outside views, the bulldozer was fitted with several video cameras linked to two monitors mounted on the vehicle's dashboard. The cameras were protected on the outside by three-inch (7.6 cm) shields of clear bulletproof polycarbonate. Compressed-air nozzles were fitted to blow dust away from the video cameras.

Three rifles, including a .50 BMG rifle, were mounted in the vehicle. At the time of the demolition it also contained three handguns and enough food and water to last a week.

=== Motivation ===
Investigators later found Heemeyer's handwritten list of targets of 107 people who he thought had wronged him. The Docheff family was at the top of the list (written as "Douche-eff"). The list also included various buildings, companies, judges, politicians, newspaper editors and anyone who sided against him in past disputes. While he did not damage them, one entrant was the local Catholic Church due to their opposition to his attempts to legalize gambling, as well as theological differences, as Heemeyer was a member of the Christian Reformed Church.

Prior to the rampage, Heemeyer had scrawled a list of complaints onto an old "For Sale" sign, as well as scrap paper. These ranged from the Docheffs' unwillingness to pay the large sums he requested, the sanitation district's fining of him, and that the town had approved the plant construction. The other writings suggested that God had stopped the plant from being constructed in 1992, and alluded to a belief that God had caused the deaths of multiple people who had opposed him. Heemeyer further claimed that "I was always willing to be reasonable until I had to be unreasonable", adding that "Sometimes reasonable men must do unreasonable things."

In addition to these writings, Heemeyer recorded three audio tapes explaining his motivation for the attack. The tapes contained two separate recordings on each side for a total of six recordings. He mailed these to his brother in South Dakota shortly before stepping into his bulldozer. Heemeyer's brother turned the tapes over to the Federal Bureau of Investigation (FBI), who in turn sent them to the Grand County Sheriff's Department. The tapes are about 2½ hours in length. The first recording was made on April 13, 2004. The last recording was made on May 22, 13 days before the rampage.

"God built me for this job", Heemeyer said in the first recording. He also said it was God's plan that he not be married or have a family so that he could be in a position to carry out such an attack. "I think God will bless me to get the machine done, to drive it, to do the stuff that I have to do", he said. "God blessed me in advance for the task that I am about to undertake. It is my duty. God has asked me to do this. It's a cross that I am going to carry and I'm carrying it in God's name."

Other statements included in the tapes make mention of Heemeyer's view that he was an "American Patriot", with local journalist Patrick Brower suggesting this may be indicative of links to the broader patriot movement.

== Rampage and death ==
Heemeyer's armored Komatsu D355A bulldozer moving through the Sky-Hi News office during the June 4, 2004 rampage in Granby

On June 4, 2004, starting at around 2:15 p.m., Heemeyer began by driving his armored bulldozer through Mountain Park Concrete, owned by the Docheff family. At the time of the attack, Cody Docheff was at the concrete plant, screening topsoil at the gravel pit, when he got a notification over his radio that there had been an explosion at the precast concrete shop. Several employees attempted to stop the bulldozer by cramming objects into the treads in order to jam it, but to no effect. Cody Docheff, initially believing the dozer to be under remote control, fired a pistol at it and attempted to climb on top, to no effect, before engaging the bulldozer with his own front-end loader, again to no success. During this time, Heemeyer fired multiple rounds at the loader. A deputy from the sheriff's office arrived on the scene, followed by a Colorado State Patrol trooper, who was fired upon by Heemeyer. More deputies arrived and began firing on the dozer, attempting to destroy the cameras with gunfire, but were unable to penetrate the three-inch (7.6 cm) bulletproof plastic. At one point, Heemeyer charged at a firing position occupied by several state troopers, who evacuated mere seconds before he demolished it, with one eyewitness noting that had they taken any longer, they would have been killed.

After the concrete plant, Heemeyer turned onto Agate Avenue and headed south toward town at approximately 5 mph (8 km/h). The officers at the plant requested a reverse 911 call be made to all residents in order to initiate evacuations. Undersheriff Glenn Trainer climbed atop the bulldozer and rode it "like a bronc buster, trying to figure out a way to get a bullet inside the dragon". He also dropped a stun grenade down the bulldozer's exhaust pipe, with no apparent effect, and was later forced to jump down to avoid debris.

Heemeyer then advanced on Granby Town Hall, which had been hosting a story hour for children in its library when the rampage began. All occupants were evacuated only moments before Heemeyer reached the building, an hour after the rampage began. Heemeyer turned to the Liberty Savings Bank, where he aimed at the corner office where a woman who was a part of the zoning board worked.

Police forces were unable to damage the bulldozer and so instead resorted to following it, jogging alongside it en masse. Heemeyer next targeted several street fixtures, such as trees and traffic lights, before moving on to the offices of the local newspaper, and in turn the homes of the Thompson family and their workplace. A scraper was brought up to try to stop the bulldozer, but it was pushed aside.

Heemeyer next targeted a propane storage yard, firing 15 bullets at the tanks, some of which contained 30,000 U.S. gal (110,000 liters). Police were forced to hurriedly evacuate all residents within one thousand yards (910 m) of the site, including a senior housing complex. Heemeyer then fired upon nearby power transformers, with a high risk of igniting the tanks, but struggled to find a good angle. Heemeyer hit the transformers once and missed his other shots. "Had these tanks ruptured and exploded, anyone within one-half mile [800 m] of the explosion could have been endangered", the sheriff's department said. Twelve police officers and residents of a senior citizens complex were within such a range. After leaving, he was engaged by another scraper, which he similarly defeated.

At this point, local authorities and the Colorado State Patrol feared they were running out of options in terms of firepower, as the approximately 200 rounds fired by police had been ineffective up to that point, and that Heemeyer would soon turn against civilians in Granby. Governor Bill Owens allegedly considered authorizing the Colorado National Guard to use either an Apache attack helicopter equipped with a Hellfire missile or a two-man fire team equipped with a Javelin anti-tank missile to destroy the bulldozer. As late as 2011, Governor Owens's staff vehemently denied considering such a course of action. Members of the State Patrol, however, claim that to the contrary, the governor did consider authorizing an attack, but ultimately decided against it due to the potential collateral damage of a missile strike in the heart of Granby being significantly higher than what Heemeyer could have caused with his bulldozer.

Heemeyer finally attacked the Gambles Store, targeting it due to the owner's involvement in the hearings about the batch plant. As the bulldozer slowly plowed through the building, one of the previous scrapers was maneuvered onto the sidewalk behind Heemeyer's path, blocking him from retreating back onto the street, after which the civilian operator exited the vehicle and fled to safety. Forced to continue forwards and unaware of a small basement on the property, Heemeyer was lured into driving into the building as a means to hopefully pass through it, drive through the other side and continue his attack. However, the tread of the machine slipped into the basement due to its immense weight, essentially deactivating the machine. The radiator had also been damaged, and the engine was leaking, before failing. As such, it was noted that even if Heemeyer had been able to free himself, the bulldozer would not have been able to operate much longer. About a minute later, at 4:30 p.m. MST, one of the SWAT team members, who had swarmed around the machine, reported hearing a single gunshot from inside the cab. It was later determined that Heemeyer had shot himself in the head with a .357-caliber handgun.

== Aftermath ==
=== Immediate aftermath ===
Police had first used explosives in an attempt to remove the steel plates for fear of booby traps, but after the third explosion failed, they cut through them with an oxyacetylene cutting torch. Grand County Emergency Management Director Jim Holahan stated that authorities were able to access and remove Heemeyer's body at 2 a.m. the next day, on June 5.

The attack lasted two hours and seven minutes, damaging 13 buildings, 11 of which were occupied until moments before their destruction. His targets included the town hall, the Sky-Hi News office, Gambles General Store, Maple Street Builders, Mountain Parks Electric Co, Liberty Savings Bank, Kopy Kat Graphics, the wall of his former business, the home of a former mayor (in which the mayor's 82-year-old widow then resided), and a hardware store owned by another man Heemeyer named in a lawsuit, as well as a few others. The rampage knocked out natural gas service to the town hall and the concrete plant, damaged a truck, and destroyed part of a utility service center. As part of the rampage, Heemeyer destroyed several trees outside a local business that the owner had previously claimed were hurting his business. The damage was estimated at $7 million, $2 million of which was to the concrete plant (underinsured, resulting in a payout of $700,000).

Many town records and archives were destroyed along with the town hall.

Defenders of Heemeyer said that he made a point of not hurting anybody during his bulldozer rampage. Ian Daugherty, a bakery owner, said Heemeyer "went out of his way" not to harm anyone. Cody Docheff stated that "if Heemeyer truly didn't want to hurt anybody, he would have plundered the center of town on the weekend, when most businesses would have been empty". The sheriff's department said that the fact that no one was injured was not due to good intent as much as to good luck.

On April 19, 2005, the town announced plans to scrap Heemeyer's bulldozer. The plan involved dispersing individual pieces to many separate scrap yards to prevent souvenir-taking.

Although no one other than Heemeyer was killed in the incident, the modified bulldozer has occasionally been referred to as the "Killdozer".

Heemeyer has since gained supporters on the Internet who view his rampage as an act of patriotic civil disobedience against a corrupt government. Patrick Brower, a reporter who had covered Heemeyer's numerous disputes for years and who was nearly killed during the attack, has reported receiving threatening and insulting comments as a result of pushing back against the narrative portraying Heemeyer as a hero and martyr. Others have called Heemeyer's rampage domestic terrorism.

=== Long-term impact and rebuilding ===
The destruction left Granby with a massive financial and emotional burden. While the state assisted with municipal repairs like the town hall, the business owners faced severe economic issues because of the costs to replace their properties. Casey Farrell, the owner of Gamble's General Store, struggled for over seven years to rebuild his business. He had to take out money from his life savings and retirement account to reopen his store on Main Street in 2012.

Residents and victims have continuous frustration that the town's history is overshadowed by the rampage. During the 20th anniversary of the event in June of 2024, the town hall and the Sky-Hi News office locked their doors to the public. Granby Mayor Josh Hardy released a statement emphasizing the impact the event had on the community and a strong desire for the town to be known for more than the tragedy.

== In popular culture ==
- Leviathan — a 2014 Russian film originally inspired by Heemeyer's story, although the similarities were no longer obvious in the final version of the script
- Tread — a 2019 documentary film based on the rampage
- "Killdozer" — a 2020 song by the artist Kim Dracula, based on the events of the rampage
- "Killdozer" — a 2024 song by Madeline Johnston (performing as 'Midwife')

== See also ==
- Improvised fighting vehicle
- Vehicle-ramming attack
- 2008 Jerusalem bulldozer attack
- Shawn Nelson — perpetrator of a similar armored vehicle rampage in San Diego, California
- Tank (film)
- Holdout (real estate)
- NIMBY
