= Ralph Zipper =

American physician and filmmaker (born 1965)

- Born: October, 1965; Brooklyn, New York, U.S.
- Education: Mount Sinai School of Medicine
- Occupation: Filmmaker
- Spouse: Erica Zipper

Ralph Zipper (born 1965) is an American physician and filmmaker. He is best known as one of the executive producers of the 2011 Academy Award-winning documentary "Undefeated".

== Early life and education ==
Zipper was born in 1965, in Brooklyn, New York. He graduated from Fort Lee High School in 1983. He earned a bachelor's degree in biology from the University of Connecticut. He then attended Mount Sinai School of Medicine and completed his postgraduate training in urogynecology at Johns Hopkins Hospital in Baltimore.

== Career ==
Zipper founded his urogynecology practice, Zipper Urogynecology Associates, in Melbourne, Florida. He specializes in treating pelvic floor dysfunction and related problems. He recognized during his gynecology training that urogynecology was an underserved field with a need for innovation.

Zipper is the inventor of what he describes as the "incision-less vaginal rejuvenation surgery" and has "trained thousands of physicians in methods I've developed". Another innovation is the SoLá Pelvic Therapy Laser System, a transvaginal photobiomodulation laser treatment designed to improve women's pelvic health by stimulating cellular activity and tissue regeneration.

In 2018, Zipper co-founded the DRYFT1 Company, a recreational e-vehicle manufacturer. and established the DRYFT1 Company to get the Dryft Board ready for market.

== Filmmaking ==
Ralph Zipper's involvement in film production began alongside his brother, Glen Zipper. Their interest in filmmaking developed during childhood when they created Super 8 movies using their father's projector. They later established Zipper Brothers Films in honor of their late father, Steve Zipper.

In 2008, Ralph indicated a desire to engage in film projects with social significance. This led to their involvement with the documentary Undefeated, for which Glen received a treatment in 2009. After reviewing preliminary footage of a volunteer coach working with an underprivileged high school football team, the brothers chose to finance and serve as executive producers for the film. Ralph primarily remained in Florida during production, while operational decisions were managed by his brother and the directors, Dan Lindsay and TJ Martin. Zipper Brothers Films was the sole financier of the documentary, which was noted for its depiction of the challenges faced by disadvantaged youths and the role of mentorship.

Zipper has also produced the documentaries and mini-series The Nightmare (2015), Killing Them Safely (2015), and Ramblin' Freak (2017).

== Awards and recognition ==
- Academy Award for Best Documentary Feature Film for Undefeated (2012). The film also won best documentary at the Chicago Film Festival and the New York Documentary Festival.
- Nomination for induction into the Brevard Hall of Fame (2013), recognizing his achievements in film.
