= Challenger: The Final Flight =

2020 American documentary series

- Promotional poster
- Genre: Docuseries
- Developed by: Glen Zipper; Steven Leckart
- Directed by: Daniel Junge; Steven Leckart
- Music by: Jeff Beal
- Country of origin: United States
- Original language: English
- No. of episodes: 4

Production
- Executive producers: Ben Stephenson; Rachel Rusch Rich; Glen Zipper; Sean Stuart; J. J. Abrams
- Producers: Maren Domzalski; Bridget Topp; Steven Leckart; Daniel Junge
- Cinematography: Graham Willoughby
- Editors: Poppy Das; Adrienne Gits
- Running time: 41–52 minutes
- Production companies: Bad Robot; Zipper Bros Films; Sutter Road Picture Company

Original release
- Network: Netflix
- Release: September 16, 2020

Challenger: The Final Flight is a 2020 American docuseries developed by Glen Zipper and Steven Leckart for Netflix. It focuses on the Space Shuttle Challenger disaster, including the build-up to the flight, interviews with key individuals and fallout from the disaster.

The series was released on Netflix on September 16, 2020.

== Episodes ==
No.	Title	Original release date
1	"Space for Everyone"	September 16, 2020
President Nixon authorizes the Space Shuttle, a reusable spacecraft that will transform the space frontier. Following a positive campaign, NASA introduces a diverse group of 35 astronaut candidates. Thousands witness Columbia's first launch, the first American spaceflight in six years. However, an ongoing problem with the solid rocket boosters threatens to derail the space program.
2	"HELP!"	September 16, 2020
Following a nationwide search, Christa McAuliffe is named the Teacher in Space Project winner. An alarming amount of O-ring erosion is discovered in the solid rocket boosters. When it continues, Morton Thiokol engineers feel it is not being effectively dealt with. However, NASA is under pressure due to a growing schedule, so a waiver is issued to keep the Space Shuttle flying.
3	"A Major Malfunction"	September 16, 2020
STS-51-L is plagued with scrubbed launches due to unfavorable weather and equipment failures. NASA has a program assessment review to discuss what going down to below-freezing temperatures the night before will mean. During a teleconference, Thiokol engineers make a presentation, recommending to refrain from launching or doing so below 53 degrees. However, the SRB project manager is angry at what he considers an "irrational decision" and makes an intimidating comment that manipulates Thiokol into changing their minds. Cold overnight temperatures see icicles form on the service structure and lead to a two-hour delay so the shuttle stack can be inspected before Challenger is cleared for launch.
4	"Nothing Ends Here"	September 16, 2020
In the wake of the Challenger disaster, President Reagan speaks to the nation from the Oval Office before forming an investigation board. Nobel Prize-winning physicist Richard Feynman plays a crucial role in the probe, demonstrating on live television that O-rings lack resiliency at 32 degrees. The Rogers Commission returns its verdict of a "fatally flawed" decision-making process, stating NASA's attitude to blame. Space Shuttle flights resume 32 months later when a reformed NASA successfully launches Discovery.

== Release ==
The official trailer was released on September 2, 2020.

== Reception ==
The series has an approval rating of 85% based on 20 reviews on Rotten Tomatoes, with an average rating of 8.2/10. The critics' consensus on the website reads, "Challenger: The Final Flight doesn't reveal any new information, but intimate interviews elevate its well-crafted, heartbreaking retelling of an avoidable national tragedy." On Metacritic, the series scored 76 out of 100, indicating "generally favourable reviews" based on a weighted average.
