= John Candy: I Like Me =

2025 film by Colin Hanks

- Release poster
- Directed by: Colin Hanks
- Produced by: Colin Hanks; Johnny Pariseau; George Dewey; Shane Reid; Ryan Reynolds; Sean Stuart; Glen Zipper
- Starring: John Candy
- Cinematography: Justin Kane
- Edited by: Shane Reid; Darrin Roberts
- Music by: Tyler Strickland
- Production companies: Amazon MGM Studios; Maximum Effort; Company Name; Zipper Bros. Films
- Distributed by: Amazon Prime Video
- Release dates: September 4, 2025 (TIFF); October 10, 2025 (United States)
- Running time: 113 minutes
- Country: United States
- Language: English

John Candy: I Like Me is a 2025 American documentary film, directed by Colin Hanks, and a portrait of the Canadian actor John Candy. It premiered as the opening night film of the Toronto International Film Festival on September 4, 2025, followed by its digital release on Amazon Prime Video on October 10.

== Premise ==
John Candy began his career on the sketch comedy series Second City Television before becoming one of the most popular and beloved stars of comedy films until his death of a heart attack in 1994. The film relies primarily on rare and never-before-seen archive footage, outtakes, private home video, audio commentary, and interviews provided by friends and family. The film's title comes from a line that Candy's character spoke in a memorable scene from the 1987 film Planes, Trains and Automobiles.

== Appearances ==
- Andrew Alexander
- Dan Aykroyd
- Mel Brooks
- Chris Candy, John's son
- Jennifer Candy-Sullivan, John's daughter
- Rosemary Candy, John's wife
- Steve Aker, John's cousin
- John Candy (archive footage)
- Chris Columbus
- Macaulay Culkin
- Robin Duke
- Tom Hanks
- Don Lake
- Eugene Levy
- Andrea Martin
- Steve Martin
- Bill Murray
- Dick Cavett (archive footage)
- Conan O'Brien
- Catherine O'Hara
- Kelvin Pruenster
- Harold Ramis (archive footage)
- Martin Short
- Dave Thomas

== Production ==
John Candy: I Like Me was first announced by producer Ryan Reynolds in 2022. The film's acquisition from Amazon Prime Video was announced in February 2023.

=== Music ===
Cynthia Erivo recorded a cover of the song "Everytime You Go Away" (that ended the film Planes, Trains and Automobiles), which was released as a single on October 3, 2025.

Tyler Strickland composed the film score, with the soundtrack album released by Lakeshore Records on October 17, 2025.

Studio cut excerpts used the following tracks:

==== Track listing ====
John Candy: I Like Me (Original Motion Picture Soundtrack)
No.	Title	Length
1.	"A Life Well Lived"	2:45
2.	"He Was a Kid"	2:38
3.	"A Quiet Life"	4:14
4.	"Escape into Character"	1:38
5.	"Second City"	0:36
6.	"Argonauts"	2:52
7.	"The Fun Time Could End"	2:26
8.	"The Real Article"	1:33
9.	"Meeting Rose"	2:45
10.	"Finding John"	3:05
11.	"Interested in Film"	1:55
12.	"You Don't Know"	2:18
13.	"From the Archives"	1:59
14.	"John Becomes a Star"	1:01
15.	"Happy the Way I Am"	3:43
16.	"My Brother Jim"	1:31
17.	"All Too Much"	4:56
18.	"Durango"	1:48
19.	"A Gift to the World"	2:30
Total length:		46:22

== Release ==
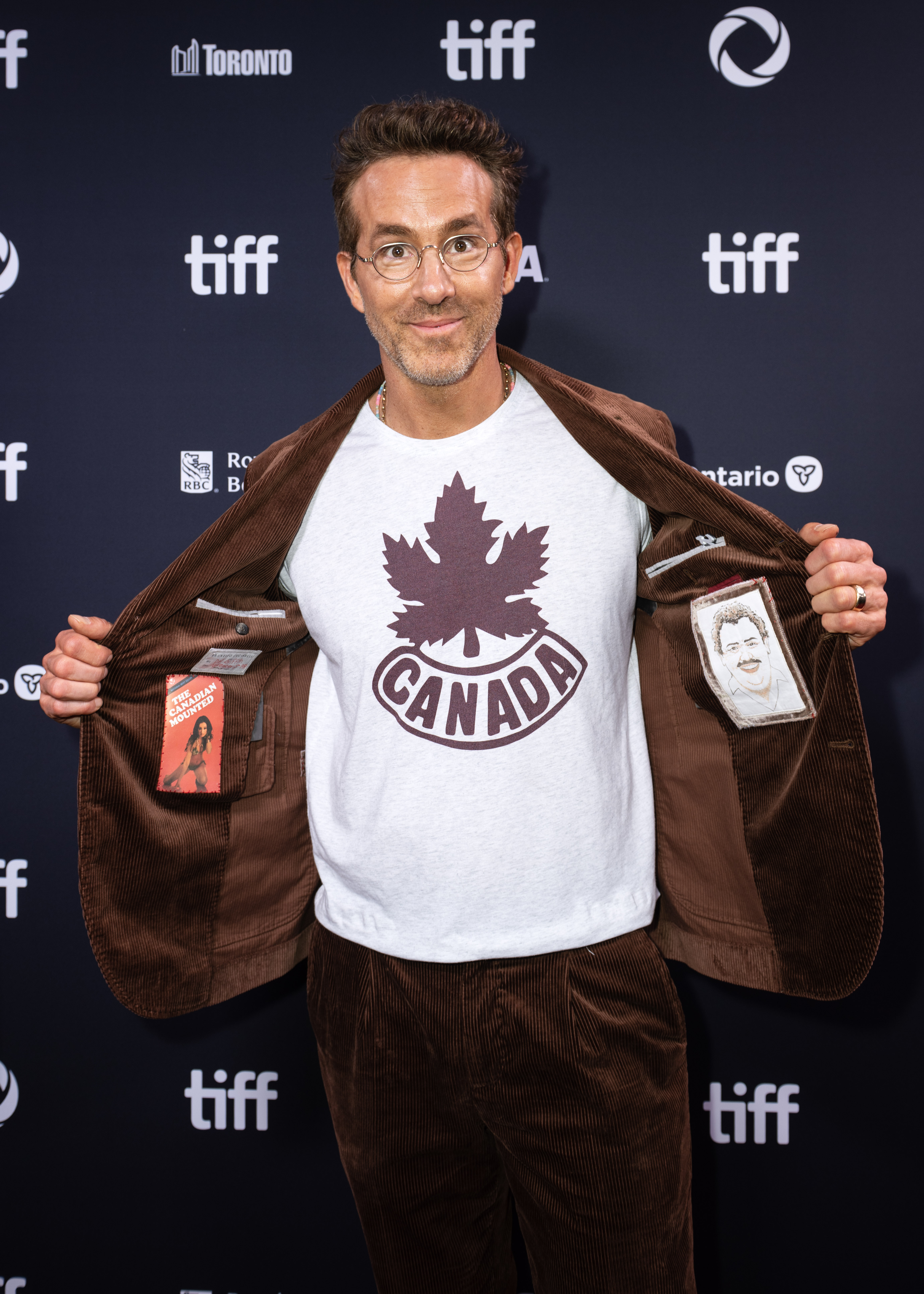
Ryan Reynolds at the film's premiere at the 2025 Toronto International Film Festival

The world premiere of John Candy: I Like Me took place at the Toronto International Film Festival on September 4, 2025, at the Roy Thomson Hall, which included a live Q&A session with the film's director, producer and Candy's children, Jennifer and Christopher Candy, following the screening. Canadian prime minister Mark Carney attended the premiere, spoke to the audience, and paid tribute to Candy. The same day, an official trailer was released by Amazon Prime Video.

=== Audience viewership ===
According to Amazon, John Candy: I Like Me debuted at No. 1 on Prime Video for its digital release in the United States and ranked third for the week ending October 17, 2025.

== Reception ==
=== Critical response ===
On the review aggregator website Rotten Tomatoes, 89% of 76 critics' reviews are positive, with an average rating of 7.7/10. The website's consensus reads: "Focusing on the good times as it chronicles John Candy's life and career, I Like Me gathers those who knew and loved the iconic actor for a bittersweet retrospective that feels like a cathartic group hug." Metacritic, which uses a weighted average, assigned the film a score of 69 out of 100, based on 14 critics, indicating "generally favorable" reviews.

Michael Rechtshaffen of The Hollywood Reporter rated the film positively, calling it a "big-hearted documentary that's as embracing and generous of spirit as the man himself". Tim Grierson of Screen Daily gave a mixed review, calling the film "an appealing, ultimately melancholy tribute to the late Canadian comic," adding, "I Like Me contains interviews with such comedy luminaries as Tom Hanks, Steve Martin, Bill Murray and Catherine O'Hara, who speak with endless affection about the late star of hits like Splash and Planes, Trains & Automobiles [...] Although a somewhat conventional portrait, the film works best as a lament for a talented actor who struggled to reach his full potential before passing away far too young." Jason Bailey of RogerEbert.com was more critical, giving it 2.5 out of 4 stars, describing some of the structuring choices as "downright baffling" and continuing, "little to no interest is paid to Candy's considerable growth as an actor over the course of his career—particularly in the last few years of his life." However, he praised the archive material, writing, "We're treated to copious home videos, rare outtakes from his movies and footage from his stage performances, family photos, the works."

=== Accolades ===
Award	Year	Category	Recipient(s)	Result	Ref.
ACE Eddie Awards	2026	Best Edited Documentary Feature	Shane Reid and Darrin Roberts	Nominated	
Astra TV Awards	2026	Best Documentary TV Movie	John Candy: I Like Me	Won	
Cinéfest Sudbury International Film Festival	2025	Audience Choice Award: Best Documentary	Colin Hanks	Won	
Cinema Audio Society Awards	2026	Outstanding Achievement in Sound Mixing for Television – Non-Fiction, Variety or Music – Series or Specials	Brad Dawe, Michael Kool, Gary A. Rizzo, and Tyler Strickland	Nominated	
Critics' Choice Documentary Awards	2025	Best Biographical Documentary	John Candy: I Like Me	Nominated	
Heartland International Film Festival	2025	Audience Choice Award: Documentary Special Presentation	Colin Hanks	Won	
Hollywood Music in Media Awards	2025	Best Original Score – Documentary	Tyler Strickland	Nominated	
Las Vegas Film Critics Society	2025	Best Documentary	John Candy: I Like Me	Nominated	
Primetime Emmy Awards	2026	Outstanding Documentary or Nonfiction Special	Colin Hanks, Sean Stuart, Glen Zipper, Ryan Reynolds, George Dewey, Johnny Pariseau, and Shane Reid	Nominated	
Primetime Emmy Awards	2026	Outstanding Music Composition for a Documentary/Nonfiction or Reality Program (Original Dramatic Score)	Tyler Strickland	Won	
Primetime Emmy Awards	2026	Outstanding Picture Editing for a Nonfiction Program	Shane Reid, Darrin Roberts, and Dominic Rolandelli	Nominated	
Primetime Emmy Awards	2026	Outstanding Sound Editing for a Nonfiction or Reality Program	Jonathan Greber and Christopher Lafaye	Nominated	
Primetime Emmy Awards	2026	Outstanding Sound Mixing for a Nonfiction Program	Gary A. Rizzo, Brad Dawe, Michael Kool, Mark Leone, Thomas Nino Orozco, and Donny Tam	Nominated	
Producers Guild of America Awards	2026	Outstanding Producer of Televised or Streamed Motion Picture	Colin Hanks, Sean M. Stuart, Glen Zipper, Ryan Reynolds, and George Dewey	Won	
San Diego Film Critics Society	2025	Best Documentary	John Candy: I Like Me	Nominated	
