= Chet Hanks =

American actor and musician (born 1990)

- Born: Chester Marlon Hanks; August 4, 1990 (age 36); Los Angeles, California, U.S.
- Other names: Chet Hanx; Chet Haze
- Citizenship: American; Greek
- Occupations: Actor; musician
- Years active: 2007–present
- Children: 1
- Parents: Tom Hanks; Rita Wilson
- Relatives: Colin Hanks (half-brother); E. A. Hanks (half-sister); Jim Hanks (uncle); Larry Hanks (uncle)

Chester Marlon Hanks (born August 4, 1990) is an American model, actor, and musician. The son of actors Tom Hanks and Rita Wilson, he has had recurring roles on television series Empire, Shameless, Your Honor, and Running Point as well as guest roles on Curb Your Enthusiasm and Atlanta.

== Early life ==
Chet Hanks is the third child of Tom Hanks, and the first child born to Hanks and actress Rita Wilson.

During high school, Hanks's parents sent him to a wilderness therapy program for troubled teens. Hanks later attended the Oakley School, a now-closed therapeutic boarding school in Oakley, Utah, where he played lacrosse.

He studied theater at Northwestern University where he was a member of the Pi Kappa Alpha fraternity. He is the younger half-brother of actor Colin Hanks.

== Career ==
=== Acting ===
Hanks's acting career began with his debut role as Dexter in the 2007 film Bratz. Soon after, his acting career picked up with a string of small film roles in the early 2010s. He was active in television in the latter half of the decade after achieving sobriety. From 2016 to 2018, Hanks appeared as Charlie, the father of character Sierra Morton's child, on the American version of Shameless. He played rapper Blake on hip-hop drama Empire from 2018 to 2019. In 2020, he had a cameo in the World War II film Greyhound starring his father. Starting later that year, he portrayed Joey Maldini, the best friend of a hit-and-run victim's brother, in the Showtime courtroom miniseries Your Honor. In 2025, Hanks appeared as Travis Bugg on the Netflix series Running Point.

=== Music ===
In 2011, while a student at Northwestern University, Hanks recorded "White and Purple" under the alias Chet Haze. The song was a remix of Wiz Khalifa's single "Black and Yellow" with the lyrics changed in reference to his school colors.

Hanks and Drew Arthur formed the musical duo FTRZ after being introduced in 2016. In 2018, they released two singles ("Models" and "NowhereLand") as well as the Ocean Park EP. The duo released two tracks in 2020, "Harley" and "Ticket Out My Head" under the new name Something Out West.

On March 26, 2021, Hanks posted a video to Instagram declaring a "White Boy Summer". This post was a prelude to the release of a music video and merchandise of the same title during the following two weeks. While the initial video was mostly received with good humor, the merchandise was criticized for using a font similar to those favored by white nationalist groups. Later that year, he released the song and music video "DAMN!" and the song "I FUX WITCHA" featuring Soulja Boy.

In October 2023, on an episode of The Adam Friedland Show, Hanks and Adam Friedland end the episode with Hanks performing a yet to be released song by Something Out West called "Leaving Hollywood".

== Personal life ==
Hanks has a daughter, Michaiah, born in 2016, with former partner Tiffany Miles. Hanks credits his daughter and his parents for helping him to overcome his struggles with substance abuse.

Along with his parents, Hanks was granted Greek citizenship in 2020 in recognition for his parents' work raising awareness for the 2018 Attica wildfires.

In October 2023, Hanks stated that he was two years sober in an interview on The Adam Friedland Show.

As of 2026, Hanks is living in Nashville.

=== Politics ===
In the summer of 2020, Hanks posted on Instagram in support of the Black Lives Matter movement. That October, he announced a social media hiatus, saying that "pro-Trump conspiracy theorists" were targeting his family. QAnon believers had accused his father of engaging in pedophilia and practicing Satanism earlier that year. Following his return to Instagram (less than a month later), he posted a video insulting Donald Trump on November 7, the day that news outlets called the 2020 United States presidential election for Joe Biden.

=== Controversies ===
Hanks has described himself as the black sheep of his family due to the contrast between his public controversies and his father's clean-cut image as "America's dad".

In 2015, Hanks was wanted by British police after damaging a hotel room, inflicting $1,800 in damages. He entered rehabilitation for cocaine addiction that year.

A judge in Fort Bend County, Texas, granted Hanks's former girlfriend Kiana Parker a temporary protective order against him in January 2021; in her filing, she described months of verbal and physical abuse. Early that March, Hanks filed a lawsuit against Parker for theft, conversion, assault, and battery, stemming from an altercation on January 8. Footage of the event, in which Hanks can be seen bleeding, was released by TMZ on March 31. Hanks's resurgence in the public eye as a result of his "White Boy Summer" video led to increased coverage of his legal battles with Parker.

On August 10, 2021, Hanks posted a video to Instagram initially urging viewers to get vaccinated for COVID-19. He then revealed it was a joke and denied being vaccinated himself, claiming: "You ain't sticking me with that motherfucking needle. It's the motherfucking flu. Get over it, okay?" He received backlash for these comments on social media, with many pointing out that his parents had been infected with COVID-19 the previous year and publicly encouraged others to get vaccinated as a result.

== Filmography ==
=== Film ===
Year	Title	Role	Notes
2007	Bratz	Dexter	
2008	Indiana Jones and the Kingdom of the Crystal Skull	Student	
2011	Larry Crowne	Pizza Delivery Boy	
2012	Project X	Partygoer	
2015	Fantastic Four	Jimmy Grimm	
2020	Greyhound	Bushnell	
TBA	Lone Wolf		Post-production

=== Television ===
Year	Title	Role	Notes
2016	Maron	Trey	4 episodes
2016–2018	Shameless	Charlie	7 episodes
2017	Tales	Troy	Episode: "F*ck the Police"
2017	Curb Your Enthusiasm	Victor	2 episodes
2018–2019	Empire	Blake	Recurring role (season 4); main role (season 5); 17 episodes
2020–2021	Your Honor	Joey Maldini	6 episodes
2021	NCIS: New Orleans	Liam McCall	Episode: "Leda and the Swan, Part II"
2022	Atlanta	Curtis	Episode: "Trini 2 De Bone"
2022	Ziwe	Himself	Episode: "Celebrity Rights Activist"
2023	The Eric Andre Show	Himself	Episode: "Don't You Say a Word"
2023	The Adam Friedland Show	Himself	Episode: "The Adam Friedland Show - Chet Hanks"
2024	The Surreal Life	Himself	Main cast (season 8)
2025–present	Running Point	Travis Bugg	Recurring role
