= Jazz Fest: A New Orleans Story =

2022 American documentary film

- Theatrical release poster
- Directed by: Frank Marshall; Ryan Suffern
- Produced by: Frank Marshall; Ryan Suffern; Sean Stuart; Alex Bowen; Maren Domzalski
- Starring: Glen David Andrews; Philip Bailey; Tarriona Ball; Tab Benoit; Jimmy Buffett; Gary Clark Jr.
- Cinematography: Boyd Hobbs; Justin Kane; Mike Parry
- Edited by: Martin Singer
- Music by: Ben Castle; Paul Pilot
- Production companies: The Kennedy/Marshall Company; Sutter Road Picture Company
- Distributed by: Sony Pictures Classics
- Release dates: March 13, 2022 (SXSW); May 13, 2022 (U.S.)
- Running time: 95 minutes
- Country: United States

Jazz Fest: A New Orleans Story is the 2022 American documentary film based on the annual New Orleans Jazz and Heritage Festival.

The documentary directed by Frank Marshall and Ryan Suffern, premiered at the South by Southwest film festival on March 13, 2022. It was distributed by Sony Pictures Classics in limited theatres on May 13, 2022 followed by a wide release, two weeks later. The documentary received generally positive reviews and won Best Music Film at the 65th Annual Grammy Awards.

== Synopsis ==
The New Orleans Jazz & Heritage Festival a.k.a. Jazz Fest is an annual event showcasing the local music, culture and heritage of New Orleans, Louisiana. It was established in 1970 and is attended by hundreds of thousands each year. The documentary features live performances and interviews from the 50th anniversary of the festival, featuring artists such as Bruce Springsteen, Katy Perry, Aaron Neville, Jimmy Buffett, Irma Thomas, Pitbull, Herbie Hancock, Samantha Fish, Al Green, Tom Jones, Gary Clark Jr. and bands such as Preservation Hall Jazz Band, The Marsalis Family, Earth, Wind & Fire, Dirty Dozen Brass Band, Mardi Gras Indians. Archival documentary footage from the past half-century also accompanies the film. Beyond the festival, the documentary also looks into the culture of New Orleans. It also documents the 2019 ceremony (the final event before being halted two years due to the COVID-19 pandemic) featuring local musicians and popular names from the music industry joining the event, as well as archival footages from the previous ceremonies.

== Release ==
In June 2021, Sony Pictures Classics acquired the distribution rights for the film. Jazz Fest: A New Orleans Story premiered at the South by Southwest film festival on March 13, 2022, and released in limited theatres in New York City and Los Angeles on May 13, before expanding to additional markets on May 27. After its theatrical run, the film was digitally released in standard definition, high definition and UHD on July 26, 2022, followed by the Ultra HD Blu-ray, Blu-ray, and DVD releases on August 9, by Sony Pictures Home Entertainment.

== Reception ==
On the review aggregator website Rotten Tomatoes, 93% of 43 critics' reviews are positive, with an average rating of 8.20/10. The website's consensus reads: "Like the music showcased by the titular festival, Jazz Fest: A New Orleans Story incorporates a long list of rich, colorful ingredients — and truly comes alive onstage. entertaining style." Metacritic, which uses a weighted average, assigned the film a score of 78 out of 100, based on 11 critics, indicating "generally favorable" reviews.

Joe Leydon of Variety summarised the documentary as a "celebration of music, cuisine and multiculturalism". Robert Abele of Los Angeles Times wrote: "a rollicking, heartfelt shout-out to a cherished fairground blowout that has long buoyed a routinely troubled city." In a three-star review, Michael O'Sullivan of The Washington Post commented that the documentary "captures the vibrant energy of the Big Easy". Neil Minnow of RogerEbert.com gave three out of four, and summarised: "After the pure joy of the musical numbers, the best thing about this movie is that even with all of its abundance it leaves you wanting more."

Glenn Kenny of The New York Times commented that the film is "conscientiously attentive to the festival’s homegrown eclecticism." Gerald Peary of The Arts Fuse commented that "for both good and bad, Jazz Fest breaks away from the 2019 celebration to show us all kinds of things" especially with the coverage of Hurricane Katrina, explaining the difference between Cajun music and Zydeco apart from covering the earlier Jazz Fest events. Josef Woodard of Santa Barbara Independent called it as a "fascinating, mighty fine gumbo of a film experience" and "one of the finer music documentaries in the current crowded menu." Mike Shutt of /Film wrote "While there are brief segments regarding the city's history, this is a film intended to celebrate just one thing, and that is the festival itself."

Steve Pond of TheWrap felt that the film "combines funky delights with lots of heart". Cory Woodroof of 615 Film commented that it "captures the heart and soul of how a festival can represent a city, and how a city can keep its culture true to itself, no matter how the times change". Barry Hertz of The Globe and Mail commented that the documentary is the "kind of electric, spirit-lifting music documentary that helps us reinvent our lifes so that we can live our entire existence in the heart of Louisiana." Todd McCarthy of Deadline Hollywood called it as "a documentary overflowing with performers and music that still barely begins to scratch the surface of what’s gone on musically for ages in the fabled, oft-distressed city."

== Accolades ==
Accolades received by Encanto
Award	Date of ceremony	Category	Recipient(s)	Result	Ref.
Grammy Awards	February 5, 2023	Best Music Film	Jazz Fest: A New Orleans Story	Won	
