= Brian Kesselring =

U.S. Navy Blue Angels pilot

Captain Brian Kesselring
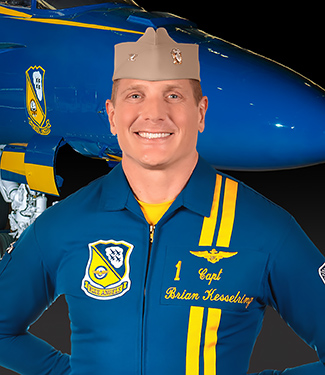
- Captain Brian C. Kesselring
- Education: Concordia
- Military career
- Allegiance: USA
- Branch: United States Navy
- Rank: Captain
- Unit: Strike Fighter Squadron VFA-105
- Commands: VFA-81 U.S. Navy Flight Demonstration Squadron CVW-5
- Known for: Blue Angels demonstration pilot
- Awards: Two Navy and Marine Corps Achievement Medals

Brian C. Kesselring is a naval aviator in the United States Navy. He was the flight leader and commanding officer of the Blue Angels, an elite fighter jet flight demonstration squadron. He joined the Navy in 2001 and served in several combat zones before becoming the commander of the Blue Angels in 2019.

== Early life ==
Brian C. Kesselring was raised in Fargo, North Dakota. He attended Concordia College (Moorhead, Minnesota) and he graduated with a Bachelor of Arts and had three majors: physics, mathematics, and business in 2000.

== Career ==
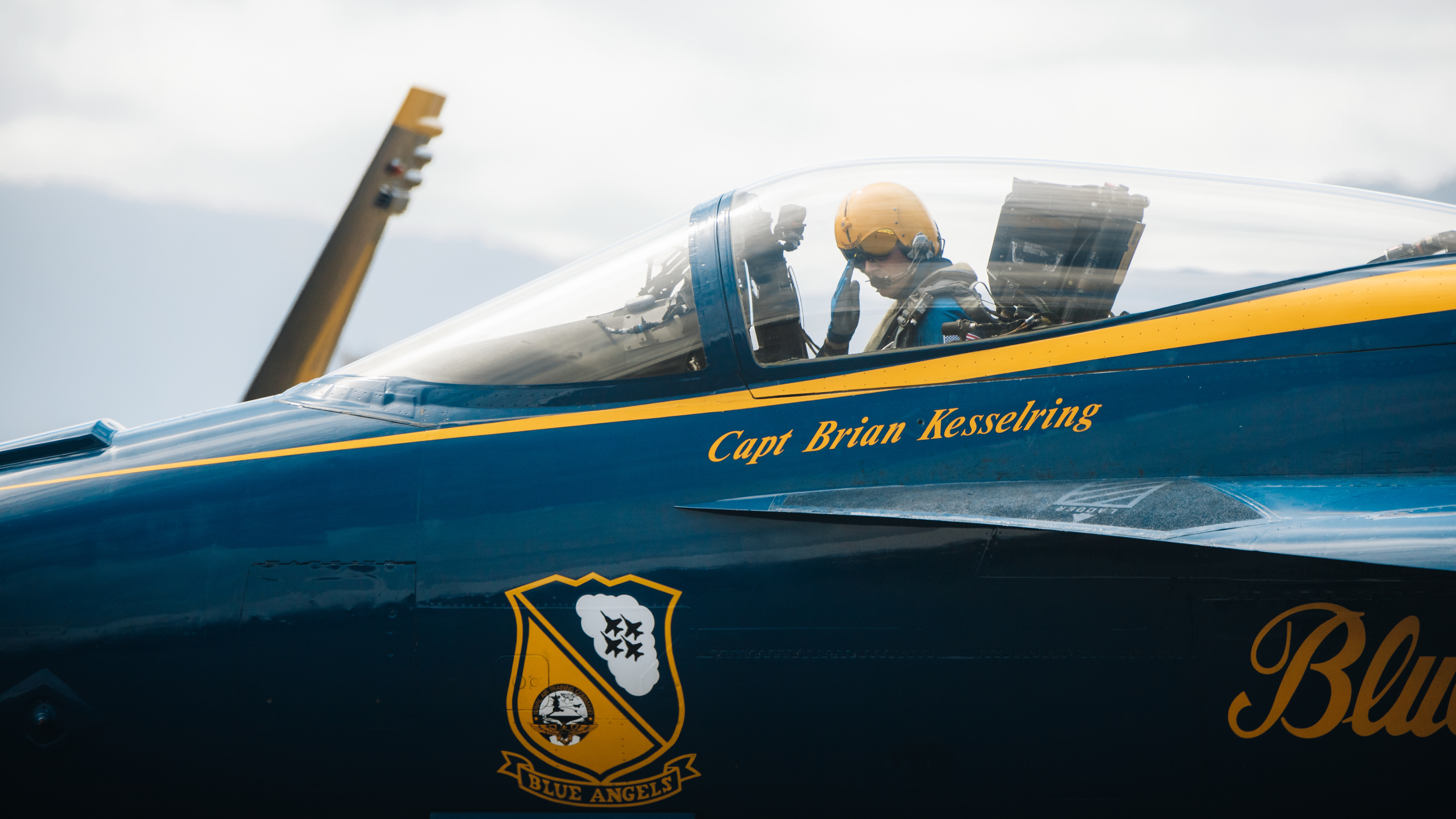
Capt. Brian Kesselring salutes from the cockpit of his F/A-18 Super Hornet

Kesselring began his military career with the United States Navy in 2001. He was trained at Officer Candidate School in Pensacola, Florida and was commissioned in the United States Navy thereafter. After completing flight training he was designated a Naval aviator in 2003. He then served two deployments in support of Operation Iraqi Freedom aboard the aircraft carrier USS Harry S. Truman. From 2008 to 2011, he was an instructor at the TOPGUN program at Naval Air Station Fallon, Nevada.

He was then deployed in combat zones, in support of Operation New Dawn and Operation Enduring Freedom. Later he was deployed in support of Operation Inherent Resolve; he was assigned to the aircraft carrier USS Theodore Roosevelt (CVN-71). By 2019 Kesselring had logged in excess of 4,600 flight hours and performed 812 carrier-arrested landings.

=== Blue Angels ===
He joined the Blue Angels in September 2019, and commanded the team from 2020 to 2022. He took over leadership of the Blue Angels from Capt. Eric Doyle. The Blue Angels transitioned from the legacy F/A-18 Hornet to the new F/A-18E Super Hornet during the 2022 season. Kesselring remained with the team for an additional season beyond the standard two-year term to facilitate the transition. During his tenure, the team was featured in the documentary film The Blue Angels. In 2023 he was named Deputy Commander of Carrier Air Wing CVW 5.
