= Elizabeth Taylor: The Lost Tapes =

2024 documentary film

- Promotional release poster
- Directed by: Nanette Burstein
- Produced by: J. J. Abrams; Sean Stuart; Glen Zipper; Bill Gerber; Rachel Rusch Rich
- Edited by: Tal Ben-David
- Music by: Logan Nelson
- Production companies: HBO Documentary Films; Bad Robot; Zipper Bros; Gerber Pictures; Sutter Road Picture Company; House of Taylor
- Distributed by: HBO
- Release dates: May 16, 2024 (Cannes); August 3, 2024 (United States)
- Running time: 101 minutes
- Country: United States
- Language: English

Elizabeth Taylor: The Lost Tapes is a 2024 American documentary film, directed by Nanette Burstein. It explores the life and career of Elizabeth Taylor, told through access to Taylor's archives and newly found audio.

It had its world premiere at the 2024 Cannes Film Festival on May 16, 2024, and was released on August 3, 2024, by HBO.

== Premise ==
The film explores the life and career of actress Elizabeth Taylor, told through access to her archives and newly found audio.

== Release and reception ==
The film had its world premiere at the 2024 Cannes Film Festival on May 16, 2024. It also screened at the Tribeca Festival on June 11, 2024. and the Nantucket Film Festival in June 2024. It was released on August 3, 2024, on HBO.

The film received an 80% rating on Rotten Tomatoes.

== Accolades ==
Award	Date of ceremony	Category	Recipient(s)	Result	Ref.
Cannes Film Festival	May 24, 2024	L'Œil d'or	Nanette Burstein	Nominated	
