= Eagles of Death Metal: Nos Amis (Our Friends) =

- Directed by: Colin Hanks
- Production companies: Live Nation; HBO
- Distributed by: HBO
- Release date: 13 February 2017
- Language: English

Eagles of Death Metal: Nos Amis (Our Friends) is a 2017 documentary film about the American rock band of the same name.
