= List of HBO Max original films =

HBO Max (briefly known as Max) is an over-the-top subscription service owned and operated by Warner Bros. Discovery. It distributes a number of original films, documentaries, and specials, alongside their slate of television series. The shows produced for HBO Max are dubbed "Max Originals". Max Originals are specifically made for audiences outside the traditional baseline HBO brand, while simultaneously working in parity with the HBO library. Content that is based on new and existing properties from WBD's subsidiaries will be distributed through HBO Max.

== Original films ==
=== Feature films ===
Title	Genre	Release date	Runtime	Language
An American Pickle (Note: Currently unavailable)	Comedy drama	August 6, 2020	1 hour, 29 min	English
Unpregnant	Comedy drama	September 10, 2020	1 hour, 44 min	English
Charm City Kings	Drama	October 8, 2020	2 hours, 4 min	English
The Witches	Fantasy comedy	October 22, 2020	1 hour, 45 min	English
Superintelligence	Action comedy	November 26, 2020	1 hour, 46 min	English
Let Them All Talk	Comedy drama	December 10, 2020	1 hour, 53 min	English
Locked Down	Romantic comedy heist	January 14, 2021	1 hour, 58 min	English
Zack Snyder's Justice League	Superhero	March 18, 2021	4 hours, 2 min	English
Mamá para rato	Comedy	November 1, 2022 (Note: Latin America)	1 hour, 34 min	Spanish
Navidad en vivo	Comedy	December 9, 2022	1 hour, 28 min	Spanish
Land of Gold	Drama	May 15, 2023	1 hour, 50 min	English; Punjabi; Spanish
Gray Matter	Science fiction thriller	July 13, 2023	1 hour, 27 min	English
Turtles All the Way Down	Romantic drama	May 2, 2024	1 hour, 52 min	English
Am I OK?	Comedy drama	June 6, 2024	1 hour, 26 min	English
'Salem's Lot	Supernatural horror	October 3, 2024	1 hour, 53 min	English
Caddo Lake	Thriller	October 10, 2024	1 hour, 39 min	English
Sweethearts	Romantic comedy	November 28, 2024	1 hour, 34 min	English
Juror No. 2 (Note: The film had a limited theatrical release on November 1, 2024, before being released on Max.)	Legal thriller	December 20, 2024	1 h 54 min	English
The Parenting	Comedy horror	March 13, 2025	1 h 40 min	English

=== Documentaries ===
Title	Subject	Release date	Runtime	Language
On the Record	Sexual abuse	May 27, 2020	1 hour, 38 min	English
On the Trail: Inside the 2020 Primaries	Politics	August 6, 2020	1 hour, 34 min	English
Class Action Park	Amusement park accidents	August 27, 2020	1 hour, 30 min	English
There Is No "I" in Threesome	Intimacy	February 11, 2021	1 hour, 27 min	English
Persona: The Dark Truth Behind Personality Tests	Personality tests	March 4, 2021	1 hour, 25 min	English
LFG	Soccer gender pay gap	June 24, 2021	1 hour, 45 min	English
Eyes on the Prize: Hallowed Ground	Civil rights movement	August 19, 2021	60 min	English
15 Minutes of Shame	Society	October 7, 2021	1 hour, 26 min	English
Reign of the Superwomen	Superhero	November 18, 2021	1 hour, 21 min	English
Diego, The Last Goodbye	Football	November 25, 2021; January 13, 2022 (Note: North America)	1 hour, 29 min	Spanish
Beanie Mania	Business	December 23, 2021	1 hour, 20 min	English
Carole King & James Taylor: Just Call Out My Name	Music	January 2, 2022	1 hour, 30 min	English
The Balcony Movie	Philosophy of life	April 17, 2022 (Note: Poland)	1 hour, 40 min	Polish
Navalny	True crime	May 26, 2022	1 hour, 38 min	English; Russian
The Herd	Equestrian vaulting	July 7, 2022	1 hour, 19 min	Polish
Citizen Ashe	Sports	July 28, 2022	1 hour, 35 min	English
Primera	Civil rights movement	September 4, 2022	1 hour, 36 min	English; Spanish
Angels of Sinjar	Biography	September 30, 2022	1 hour, 53 min	English; Kurdish
The Fastest Woman on Earth	Biography	October 20, 2022	1 hour, 44 min	English
Muxes	Muxe	November 17, 2022	1 hour, 2 min	Spanish
Santa Camp	Santa Claus	November 17, 2022	1 hour, 32 min	English
Love, Lizzo	Music	November 24, 2022	1 hour, 32 min	English
Call Me Miss Cleo	Biography	December 15, 2022	1 hour, 30 min	English
Bama Rush	Sororities	May 23, 2023	1 hour, 41 min	English
American Pain	Opioid epidemic	June 8, 2023	1 hour, 45 min	English
Boylesque	Biography	June 15, 2023	1 hour, 11 min	Polish
Glitch: The Rise & Fall of HQ Trivia	Business	July 20, 2023	1 hour, 29 min	English
Metal Monsters: The Righteous Redeemer	Monster truck	July 30, 2023	43 min	English
Polish Prayers	Biography	September 15, 2023 (Note: Europe)	1 hour, 23 min	Polish
Gumbo Coalition	Civil rights leaders	November 6, 2023	1 hour, 52 min	English
Little Richard: I Am Everything	Music	November 23, 2023	1 hour, 42 min	English
Oprah and The Color Purple Journey	Making-of	December 28, 2023	56 min	English
Chowchilla	Kidnapping	January 11, 2024	1 hour, 39 min	English
They Called Him Mostly Harmless	Death of Vance Rodriguez	February 8, 2024	1 hour, 29 min	English
Hope	Biography	June 11, 2024	1 hour, 5 min	Polish
Louder: The Soundtrack of Change	Music	October 17, 2024	1 hour, 1 min	English
Bloody Trophy	True crime	May 16, 2025	59 min	Polish

=== Specials ===
Title	Genre	Release date	Runtime	Language
My Gift: A Christmas Special from Carrie Underwood	Music	December 3, 2020	54 min	English
Homeschool Musical: Class of 2020	Musical	December 17, 2020	52 min	English
The Runaway Bunny	Animation	March 25, 2021	27 min	English
Friends: The Reunion	Unscripted reunion	May 27, 2021	1 hour, 44 min	English
Romeo Santos: Utopia Live from MetLife Stadium	Concert film	July 30, 2021	1 hour, 44 min	Spanish
Romeo Santos: The King of Bachata	Concert film	July 30, 2021	1 hour, 32 min	English; Spanish
Halsey: If I Can't Have Love, I Want Power	Visual concept album	October 7, 2021	50 min	English
Harry Potter 20th Anniversary: Return to Hogwarts	Unscripted reunion	January 1, 2022	1 hour, 42 min	English
Naked Mole Rat Gets Dressed: The Underground Rock Experience	Animated musical comedy	June 30, 2022	55 min	English
Lizzo: Live in Concert	Concert film	December 31, 2022	1 hour, 31 min	English

==== Stand-up comedy ====
Title	Release date	Runtime
Beth Stelling: Girl Daddy	August 20, 2020	58 min
Conan O'Brien's Team Coco Presents: James Veitch: Straight to VHS	August 20, 2020	57 min
HA Comedy Festival: The Art of Comedy	August 20, 2020	1 hour, 1 min
Rose Matafeo: Horndog	August 20, 2020	58 min
Chelsea Handler: Evolution	October 22, 2020	1 hour, 8 min
Colin Quinn & Friends: A Parking Lot Comedy Show	November 12, 2020	49 min
Marlon Wayans: You Know What It Is	August 19, 2021	58 min
Ahir Shah: Dots	September 23, 2021	1 hour
Comedy Chingonas	November 18, 2021	58 min
Phoebe Robinson: Sorry, Harriet Tubman	October 14, 2021	55 min
Aida Rodriguez: Fighting Words	November 4, 2021	1 hour, 3 min
2nd Annual HA Festival: The Art of Comedy	December 16, 2021	54 min
Moses Storm: White Trash	January 20, 2022	1 hour
Chris Redd: Why Am I Like This?	November 3, 2022	59 min
Tracy Morgan: Takin' It Too Far	August 17, 2023	49 min
Gary Gulman: Born on 3rd Base	December 21, 2023	1 hour, 6 min
Rory Scovel: Religion, Sex and a Few Things in Between	February 22, 2024	1 hour, 13 min
Hannah Einbinder: Everything Must Go	June 13, 2024	1 hour, 29 min

== Exclusive films ==
The following films premiered on the service without being labeled as Max Originals.

Title	Genre	Release date	Runtime	Language
No Sudden Move	Crime thriller	July 1, 2021	1 hour, 55 min	English
8-Bit Christmas	Comedy	November 24, 2021	1 hour, 37 min	English
The Fallout	High school drama	January 27, 2022	1 hour, 32 min	English
Kimi	Crime thriller	February 10, 2022	1 hour, 29 min	English
Moonshot	Science fiction romantic comedy	March 31, 2022	1 hour, 44 min	English
Father of the Bride	Comedy drama	June 16, 2022	1 hour, 57 min	English
A Christmas Story Christmas	Family comedy	November 17, 2022	1 hour, 38 min	English
Holiday Harmony	Christmas comedy	November 24, 2022	1 hour, 50 min	English
A Christmas Mystery	Christmas comedy	November 24, 2022	1 hour, 27 min	English
A Hollywood Christmas	Christmas comedy	December 1, 2022	1 hour, 31 min	English

== Upcoming original films ==
=== Feature films ===
Title	Genre	Release date	Runtime	Status
1000 Miles	Biographical film	TBA	TBA	Post-production

=== Documentaries ===
Title	Subject	Release date	Runtime	Status	Language
33 zdjęcia z getta	History	TBA	TBA	Post-production	Polish
Luva de Pedreiro: The Influencer's Untold Story	Biography	TBA	TBA	Post-production	Portuguese
