= Death of Vance Rodriguez =

American hiker and former unidentified person

Vance Rodriguez
- Rodriguez while hiking
- Born: Vance John Rodriguez; February 25, 1976; Lafayette Parish, U.S.
- Disappeared: April 2018 (aged 42); Florida
- Status: Identified in December 2020
- Died: July 2018 (aged 42); Ochopee, Florida, U.S.
- Body discovered: July 23, 2018
- Other names: Vaejor, Mostly Harmless, Ben Bilemy, Denim
- Known for: Previously unidentified decedent
- Height: 5 ft 8 in (1.73 m)

Vance John "Vaejor" Rodriguez, previously known as "Mostly Harmless", Denim, and Ben Bilemy was an American hiker whose body was found on July 23, 2018 in Big Cypress National Preserve in Florida, then remained unidentified for two years. He was identified when a previous coworker recognized photos of him in December 2020, and his identity was released in January 2021. The story came to prominence because of two viral articles written in Wired by the journalist Nicholas Thompson. It was later turned into a documentary, "They Called Him Mostly Harmless," which aired on HBO Max.

== Background ==
Rodriguez started his journey on the Appalachian Trail in April 2017, from Harriman State Park, about 30 miles north of New York City. On the way, he met several people who took pictures of him. Witnesses reported that he liked ketchup and sticky buns, that he said he came from Baton Rouge, that he was hiking to Key West, and that he claimed to have a sister living in Sarasota or Saratoga.

By January 2018, Rodriguez had reached northern Florida.

== Discovery of body and investigation ==
He was last observed alive after his arrival in the southwestern region of Florida in April 2018.

On July 23, 2018, Rodriguez was found dead in his tent by two hikers in Big Cypress National Preserve. He had no form of identification with him. The location was near Interstate 75.

The autopsy could not determine the specific cause of death, although he was described as being "emaciated." There were no signs of foul play. His DNA, dental information, and fingerprints did not match known missing person reports in any database. He wore a gray Columbia baseball hat and appeared to be between 35 and 50 years of age, with slightly graying brown hair and a beard. His backpack contained $3,500 in cash and a notebook filled with handwritten notes about Screeps, an online programming game.

Using information from witnesses' interviews, investigators developed a timeline of his activities. The Collier County Sheriff's Office also sought the aid of Othram Inc., a Texas-based company utilizing genetic genealogy to assist investigative agencies with resolving cases.

The aliases he chose to go by while hiking the Appalachian Trail have a possible connection to science fiction novels: "Mostly Harmless" possibly being a reference to Mostly Harmless by Douglas Adams, and "Ben Bilemy" possibly being a reference to Edward Bellamy, author of Looking Backward.

== Identification ==
Rodriguez was identified in December 2020, over two years after his discovery. After viewing photographs of the then-unidentified man, a previous coworker contacted authorities, who obtained DNA samples from living relatives in Lafayette Parish, Louisiana. An official announcement from the Collier County Sheriff's Office was released on January 12, 2021. Othram had confirmed the match between Rodriguez and his family by performing the required testing. He was last known to reside in New York and worked in the field of information technology.

Rodriguez's identification aired as a segment on CBS News Sunday Morning on February 21, 2021.

== See also ==
- Chris McCandless
- List of solved missing person cases (2000s)
