= The Blue Angels (film) =

2024 aviation documentary

- Release poster
- Directed by: Paul Crowder
- Produced by: Glen Powell; Sean Stuart; Glen Zipper; Mark Monroe; J. J. Abrams; Hannah Minghella
- Cinematography: Jessica Young
- Edited by: Paul Crowder; Kevin Klauber; James Leche
- Music by: James Everingham; Stewart Mitchell
- Production companies: Bad Robot; Zipper Bros. Films; Sutter Road Picture Company; Diamond Docs; Barnstorm Productions; IMAX Entertainment; Dolphin Films
- Distributed by: Amazon MGM Studios
- Release dates: May 17, 2024 (IMAX); May 23, 2024 (Amazon Prime Video)
- Running time: 93 minutes
- Country: United States
- Language: English
- Box office: $2.6 million

The Blue Angels is a 2024 American documentary film about the Blue Angels pilots of the United States Navy. It was directed by Paul Crowder and released ahead of Memorial Day weekend by Amazon MGM Studios; on May 17, 2024, in IMAX theaters and on May 23, 2024, on Amazon Prime Video. The film received generally positive reviews from critics, who praised the flying shots, but criticized the lack of human drama. Critics have described the film as an advertisement for the U.S. military.

== Background ==
The idea for the film came from Rob Stone and former Blue Angel Greg "Boss" Woolridge. Production began in March 2022, and the film was expected to be released in 2023. The members of the 2022 Blue Angels demonstration team are featured in the movie; their team leader was Captain Brian Kesselring. CAA Media financed the movie production. It was produced by JJ Abrams and Glen Powell who flew with the Blue Angels while filming Top Gun: Maverick. It documents the journey of becoming a Blue Angel, beginning with the ways they are selected and trained, and culminating in the challenges of the Blue Angel show schedule. The film shows the skill of the pilots without staging or computer-generated imagery. The film was produced by Amazon MGM Studios (through the Metro-Goldwyn-Mayer label) and IMAX. The IMAX theater run began on May 17.

== History ==
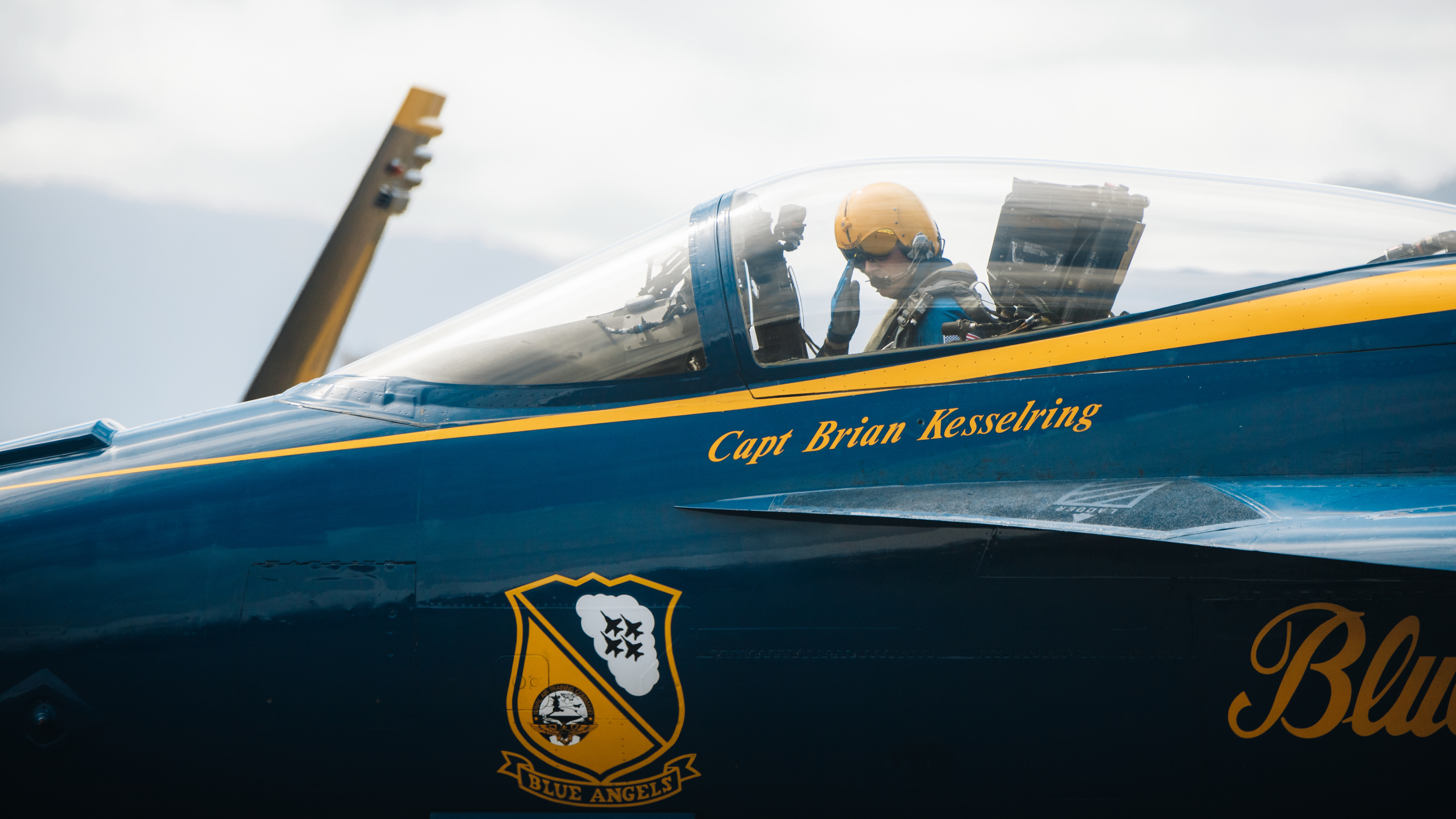
Capt. Brian Kesselring salutes from the cockpit of his F/A-18 Super Hornet

The film is the second IMAX documentary to feature the Blue Angels, following Greg MacGillivray's The Magic of Flight (1996). Creating a film for IMAX theaters required larger cameras. It was a challenge for the film crew to find places to put cameras because they were too large to put inside airplane cockpits or on airplane wings. The filmmakers used IMAX cameras rigged to a helicopter that flew among the demonstration planes. It was the first time that civilian aircraft was allowed to fly inside "the box", the Blue Angels' performance airspace. A special camera which has a speed of 1,000 frames-per-second was also used to capture the vapors coming off the jets. It took nine months to film the documentary and the film crew employed film techniques which were used in the production of the movie Top Gun: Maverick.

It was released on May 17, 2024, at IMAX theaters for a one-week run, and on Amazon Prime Video from May 23, 2024. The film shows the close bonds that develop among Blue Angel team members and their cooperative efforts to be precise in flight performances. Director Paul Crowder said,

You watch them do what they do with the Blue Angels, to fly these 22-ton jets 12 inches apart at 400 miles an hour, to have the trust in each other within the entire team—the whole team. That's something we really wanted to get across to the audience.

The film also shows the Blue Angels' first female fighter jet demonstration pilot, Amanda Lee, being inducted "through a fluke of production timing". (Note: Note, the source introduces Lee as the first Blue Angels pilot, but she was the first demonstration pilot. The first female pilot to join the Blue Angels was Captain Katie Higgins Cook in 2015, flying a transport plane, the Lockheed C-130 Hercules known as Fat Albert.) The crew then helps train Amanda Lee and the other pilots who were selected to perform as demonstration pilots in the next Blue Angel season.

== Reception ==
=== Box office ===
During the film's opening weekend, in limited release on only 255 IMAX screens, the film grossed $1.3 million. It grossed over $2.5 million during the week-long IMAX run.

=== Critical response ===
On the review aggregator website Rotten Tomatoes, 83% of 30 critics' reviews are positive, with an average rating of 7/10. The website's consensus reads, "Pulse-pounding when it takes to the skies and agreeably surface-level when it comes to concerns on the ground, The Blue Angels is a marvelous feat of aerial photography."

Movie critic Avi Offer called the film "exhilarating, heartfelt and thrilling". Matt Zoller Seitz described the film techniques as lots of low-angled heroic shots, slow motion power walking; filmed like a Hollywood action film. He called it an advertisement for the Blue Angels, their planes, the military, and patriotism. He conceded that the filming and flying were "technically impressive". Film critic Stephen Schaffer writing for the Boston Herald said, "The Blue Angels offers an apt celebration of this American military institution". Sioux City Journal editor Bruce Miller said, "For the audience, it was a chance to view the show from a new vantage point". Writing for The Hollywood Reporter, Frank Scheck said the film uses, "generous amounts of amazing flight footage, much of it shot from within the cockpit". He also said, "The feature-length film features no small amount of padding". Mark Meszoros of The News Herald said the film, "does not soar when it comes to human drama". He called the film squeaky-clean and said, "If there WERE any real drama behind the scenes, you wouldn't know it from the film". Writing for The Northern Express Joseph Beyer said, "To call The Blue Angels a real-life version of Top Gun would be too simple, although that may be the easiest possible way to understand the 1-hour-33-minute film so squeaky clean it’s rated G for all audiences."
