= Tread (film) =

2019 American documentary film

- Film poster
- Directed by: Paul Solet
- Produced by: Glen Zipper; Sean Stuart; Doug Liman; Gene Klein; David Bartis
- Cinematography: Zoran Popovic
- Edited by: Darrin Roberts
- Music by: Austin Wintory
- Production companies: Zipper Bros Films; Sutter Road Picture Company
- Distributed by: Netflix
- Release dates: March 8, 2019 (South by Southwest); February 28, 2020
- Running time: 89 minutes
- Country: United States
- Language: English

Tread is a 2019 American documentary film directed by Paul Solet centering upon a 2004 attack upon the small mountain town of Granby, Colorado by welder Marvin Heemeyer, who destroyed a number of businesses and homes in that town with a secretly fortified bulldozer after feuding with multiple residents. It premiered at the South by Southwest film festival in March 2019, and to limited theatres and on Netflix on February 28, 2020.

== Synopsis ==
In 2004, American welder Marvin Heemeyer goes on a violent rampage with a secretly fortified bulldozer made up of steel, concrete, and guns after feuding with members of the small town of Granby, Colorado.

== Reception ==
The film holds a 92% rating on the review aggregator Rotten Tomatoes, based on 12 reviews.
