= Colin Hanks =

American actor (born 1977)

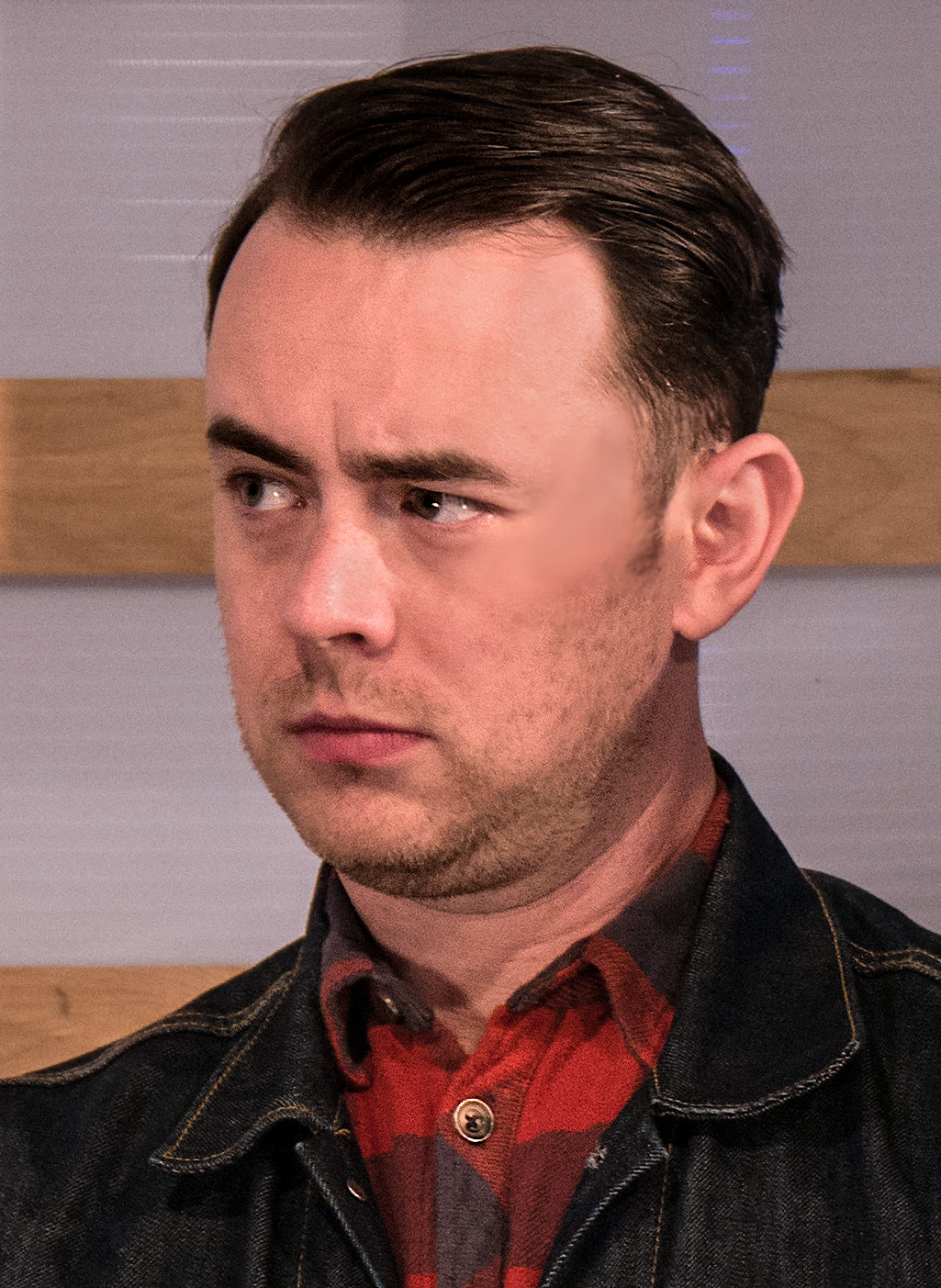
- Hanks in 2015
- Born: Colin Lewes Hanks; November 24, 1977 (age 48); Sacramento, California, U.S.
- Occupation: Actor
- Years active: 1996–present
- Spouse: Samantha Bryant (m. 2010)
- Children: 2
- Father: Tom Hanks
- Relatives: E. A. Hanks (sister); Chet Hanks (half-brother); Rita Wilson (stepmother); Jim Hanks (uncle); Larry Hanks (uncle)

Colin Lewes Hanks (born November 24, 1977) is an American actor and filmmaker. He is best known for his role as Gus Grimly on the FX crime series Fargo (2014–2015), which earned him nominations for a Golden Globe Award, a Primetime Emmy Award, and a Critics' Choice Television Award.

Hanks gained mainstream attention after a main role on the WB science fiction series Roswell (1999–2001) and his lead role in the film Orange County (2002), which was followed by a starring role in the blockbuster King Kong (2005). Hanks has also had starring roles in the films The Great Buck Howard (2008), Untraceable (2008), The House Bunny (2008), Parkland (2013), Elvis & Nixon (2016), Nobody 2 (2025), and Nuremberg (2025). He had a supporting role as Alex Vreeke in the Jumanji film series (2017–2019).

Hanks had a main role as Jack Bailey on the Fox series The Good Guys (2010) and had a role as Travis Marshall, the main antagonist on the 6th season of Showtime series Dexter (2011), the latter of which earned him a Screen Actors Guild Award nomination. Hanks' other main television roles include Greg Short on the CBS sitcom Life in Pieces (2015–2019), Barry Lapidus on the Paramount+ miniseries The Offer (2022), and Bob Broberg in Peacock's A Friend of the Family (2022). He voiced the titular character on the web series Talking Tom & Friends (2014–2021).

Hanks directed the documentary films All Things Must Pass: The Rise and Fall of Tower Records (2015), Eagles of Death Metal: Nos Amis (Our Friends) (2017) and John Candy: I Like Me (2025).

== Early life ==
Hanks was born in Sacramento, California to actor Tom Hanks and producer and actress Samantha Lewes (born Susan Jane Dillingham; 1952–2002). He has a sister, Elizabeth, and through his father's marriage to his stepmother, actress Rita Wilson, he has two younger half-brothers, Chester "Chet" and Truman.

Hanks attended Sacramento Country Day School, and then Chapman University, before transferring to Loyola Marymount University. He left without earning a degree.

== Career ==
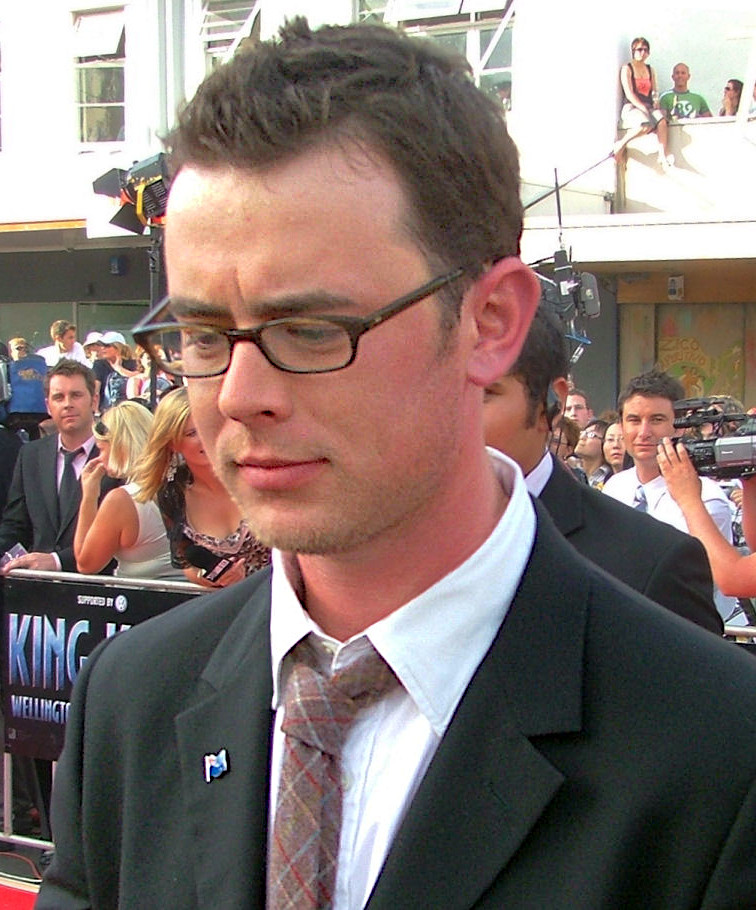
Hanks in 2005 at the premiere of Peter Jackson's King Kong in Wellington, New Zealand

In 1999, Hanks was cast as Alex Whitmann in the science-fiction series Roswell, where he appeared for the first two seasons (making a brief appearance in the third). During that time, he acted in the teen comedies Whatever It Takes with Shane West and Get Over It with Ben Foster. Hanks also made an appearance in an episode of The OC. He appeared in part eight of HBO mini-series Band of Brothers as Lieutenant Henry Jones. In 2002, he starred in his first film as Shaun Brumder in Orange County, alongside Jack Black and Schuyler Fisk. The comedy features Hanks' character trying to get into Stanford University after his guidance counselor mistakenly sends out the wrong transcript.

In 2005, he appeared in the remake of King Kong, playing the assistant to Jack Black's character. In 2006, Hanks had a cameo role in Black's Tenacious D in The Pick of Destiny, playing a drunken fraternity brother. He starred in the romantic comedy The House Bunny in 2008, playing Oliver, a charming manager of a nursing home and the love interest of Anna Faris' character. In 2008, Hanks began work as director on All Things Must Pass: The Rise and Fall of Tower Records, a documentary about Tower Records which ultimately premiered on March 17, 2015, at South by Southwest in Austin, Texas. The film received funding of nearly $100,000 through a Kickstarter campaign.

In 2009, Hanks appeared in The Great Buck Howard, which was produced by his father and also starred John Malkovich. He also played Father Gill, a young Roman Catholic priest, in season 2 of the television show Mad Men. In 2009, he made his Broadway debut, acting alongside Jane Fonda in the Moisés Kaufman play 33 Variations. Hanks starred in the 2010 Fox television series The Good Guys as young detective Jack Bailey, alongside Bradley Whitford who played an old-school detective (Dan Stark). In 2011, he starred in the indie film Lucky, alongside Ari Graynor, Ann-Margret, and Jeffrey Tambor. He also joined the cast of Dexter for season six opposite Edward James Olmos, where he portrays an art historian Travis Marshall who is involved in a murderous apocalyptic cult.

In 2014, he starred as Allison in the second season of the web series Burning Love. The same year, he also portrayed Dr. Malcolm Perry in the historical film Parkland and began a voice role in the show Talking Tom & Friends. He voices Talking Tom, the main character. In 2015, he played Officer Gus Grimly in the FX television series Fargo, for which he received Critics' Choice Television Award and Primetime Emmy Award nominations.

In 2017, Hanks appeared as the adult Alex Vreeke in the film Jumanji: Welcome to the Jungle, a role he would later reprise in the film's 2019 sequel, Jumanji: The Next Level. In 2019, Hanks portrayed a young Fred Rogers on the Comedy Central show Drunk History. The same year, Hanks appeared as a guest judge on Netflix's baking competition Sugar Rush in the episode "Sweet Geeks".

== Personal life ==
Hanks dated Busy Philipps in the 1990s while in college. In June 2009, Hanks became engaged to former New York publicist Samantha Bryant. The couple married on May 8, 2010, in Los Angeles. Together, they have two daughters, one born in 2011 and the other in 2013.

Hanks is a San Francisco Giants baseball fan and attended their World Series-clinching victory in Texas in November 2010. He also directed a 30 for 30 short, The Anti-Mascot, about their disastrous Crazy Crab stint in the 1980s. He is also a fan of Liverpool FC, the San Francisco 49ers, Sacramento Kings, and Los Angeles Kings. He was the official Kevin and Bean Los Angeles Kings playoff correspondent for the 2011–12 and 2012–14 seasons.

== Filmography ==
=== Film ===
| Year | Title | Role | Notes |
|---|---|---|---|
| 1996 | That Thing You Do! | Male Page | |
| 2000 | Whatever It Takes | Paul Newby | |
| 2001 | Get Over It | Felix Woods | |
| 2002 | Orange County | Shaun Brumder | |
| 2003 | 11:14 | Mark | |
| 2005 | Rx | Jonny | Also co-producer; a.k.a. Simple Lies |
| 2005 | Standing Still | Quentin | |
| 2005 | King Kong | Preston | |
| 2006 | Alone with Her | Doug | |
| 2006 | Tenacious D in The Pick of Destiny | Drunken fraternity brother | |
| 2007 | Careless | Wiley Roth | |
| 2008 | The Great Buck Howard | Troy Gable | |
| 2008 | Untraceable | Griffin Dowd | |
| 2008 | My Mom's New Boyfriend | Henry Durand | a.k.a. My Spy |
| 2008 | The House Bunny | Oliver | |
| 2008 | W. | David Frum | |
| 2010 | High School | Brandon Ellis | |
| 2010 | Barry Munday | Heavy Metal Greg | |
| 2011 | Lucky | Ben Keller | |
| 2012 | The Guilt Trip | Rob | |
| 2013 | Super Buddies | Megasis/Captain Canine (voice) | Video |
| 2013 | Parkland | Dr. Malcolm Perry | |
| 2015 | No Stranger Than Love | Clint Coburn | |
| 2015 | All Things Must Pass: The Rise and Fall of Tower Records | —N/a | Director; documentary |
| 2015 | Vacation | Jake | |
| 2016 | Elvis & Nixon | Egil Krogh | |
| 2017 | Eagles of Death Metal: Nos Amis (Our Friends) | —N/a | Director; documentary |
| 2017 | Band Aid | Uber Douche | |
| 2017 | Jumanji: Welcome to the Jungle | Adult Alex Vreeke | Uncredited cameo |
| 2019 | Jumanji: The Next Level | Alex Vreeke | |
| 2021 | How It Ends | Charlie | |
| 2024 | Orion and the Dark | Adult Orion Mendelson (voice) | |
| 2024 | And Mrs | Nathan | |
| 2025 | Nobody 2 | Abel | |
| 2025 | John Candy: I Like Me | —N/a | Director; documentary |
| 2025 | Nuremberg | Gustave Gilbert | |
| 2026 | Lucky Strike | Colonel Neale | |

=== Television ===
| Year | Title | Role | Notes |
|---|---|---|---|
| 1999–2001 | Roswell | Alexander Charles "Alex" Whitman | Main role (seasons 1–2); 45 episodes |
| 2001 | Band of Brothers | Lieutenant Henry Jones | Episode: "The Last Patrol" |
| 2004 | The O.C. | Grady | Episode: "The L.A." |
| 2005, 2008 | Numb3rs | Marshall Penfield | 2 episodes |
| 2008 | Mad Men | Father John Gill | 3 episodes |
| 2010 | The Good Guys | Jack Bailey | 20 episodes |
| 2011 | Dexter | Travis Marshall | 12 episodes |
| 2011 | Robot Chicken | Sam Witwicky / Vanity Smurf | Voice, episode: "Terms of Endaredevil" |
| 2012 | Happy Endings | Himself | Episode: "Cocktails & Dreams" |
| 2012, 2015 | Comedy Bang! Bang! | Himself / Movie Cop | 2 episodes |
| 2013 | Burning Love | Allison | 8 episodes |
| 2013 | NCIS | Richard Parsons | 3 episodes |
| 2013 | Key & Peele | Director | Episode: "The Power of Wings" |
| 2013 | Ghost Ghirls | Tom Wellington / Bloody Bat | Episode: "Field of Screams" |
| 2014 | Bad Teacher | Coach Donnie | 3 episodes |
| 2014–2015 | Fargo | Officer Gus Grimly | Main cast (season 1); guest (season 2) |
| 2014–2021 | Talking Tom & Friends | Talking Tom, Gardener, Wesley | Voice, main role |
| 2015 | 30 for 30 Shorts | Director | Short film: The Anti-Mascot |
| 2015 | Mom | Andy Dreeson | Episode: "Godzilla and a Sprig of Mint" |
| 2015 | What Lives Inside | Taylor Delaney | 4 episodes |
| 2015–2019 | Drunk History | Various | 6 episodes |
| 2015–2019 | Life in Pieces | Greg Short | Main cast |
| 2017 | 30 for 30 Shorts | Director | Short film; The Amazing Adventures of Wally and The Worm |
| 2018 | Sugar Rush | Himself / Guest Judge | Episode: "Sweet Geeks" |
| 2019 | The Final Table | Himself / Guest Judge | Episode: "USA" |
| 2019–2021 | Big City Greens | Mark | Voice, 2 episodes |
| 2020 | American Dad! | Alien Captain / Successful Classmate | Voice, 2 episodes |
| 2021 | Impeachment: American Crime Story | Mike Emmick | 7 episodes |
| 2022 | The Offer | Barry Lapidus | Miniseries |
| 2022 | A Friend of the Family | Bob Broberg | Miniseries |
| 2026 | Silo | Per Stensen | 3 episodes |

=== Music videos ===
| Year | Artist | Song | Role |
|---|---|---|---|
| 2021 | Royal Blood | "Hold On" | Roy Boulders |

=== Video games ===
| Year | Title | Voice role | Notes |
|---|---|---|---|
| 2005 | King Kong | Preston | |

== Accolades ==
| Year | Association | Category | Work | Result |
|---|---|---|---|---|
| 2002 | MTV Movie Awards | Best Male Breakthrough Performance | Orange County | Nominated |
| 2005 | Spike Video Game Awards | Best Cast | Peter Jackson's King Kong: The Official Game of the Movie | Won |
| 2005 | San Diego Film Festival | Soaring Star Award | Body of Work | Won |
| 2011 | Screen Actors Guild Awards | Outstanding Performance by an Ensemble in a Drama Series | Dexter | Nominated |
| 2014 | Critics' Choice Television Awards | Best Supporting Actor in a Movie/Miniseries | Fargo | Nominated |
| 2014 | Golden Globe Awards | Best Supporting Actor – Series, Miniseries or Television Film | Fargo | Nominated |
| 2014 | Primetime Emmy Awards | Outstanding Supporting Actor in a Miniseries or a Movie | Fargo | Nominated |
| 2016 | Satellite Awards | Best Actor – Television Series Musical or Comedy | Life in Pieces | Nominated |
