= 2007 in aviation =

This is a list of aviation-related events from 2007.

== Events ==
=== January ===
- 1 January
  - After its pilots became preoccupied with troubleshooting the inertial navigation system, inadvertently disconnect the autopilot, and lose control of the aircraft, Adam Air Flight 574, a Boeing 737-400, crashes into the Makassar Strait near Polewali in Sulawesi, Indonesia, killing all 102 people on board.
  - Caribbean Airlines begins operations, replacing BWIA West Indies Airways, which had shut down the previous day.
- 6 January – BA Connect, easyJet, XL Airways UK, Thomsonfly, Thomas Cook Airlines, Balkan Bulgarian Airlines, First Choice Airways, Air Malta, KLM Cityhopper and SN Brussels Airlines cancel all their flights to and from Bristol International Airport in North Somerset, England, in a row over runway safety.
- 9 January – An Antonov An-26B of AerianTur-M crashes while attempting to land at Balad Air Base in Balad, Iraq, killing 34 of the 35 people aboard. Officials blame the crash on fog, but some witnesses say that they saw a surface-to-air missile strike the aircraft, and the Islamic Army in Iraq claims to have shot it down.
- 22 January – The government of Togo establishes the Agence Nationale de l'Aviation Civile du Togo ("National Agency of Civil Aviation of Togo") as Togo's national civil aviation authority. It replaces the Direction de l’Aviation Civile ("Directorate of Civil Aviation").

=== February ===
- 21 February – Adam Air Flight 172, a Boeing 737-33A with 149 people on board, suffers a bent fuselage – the fuselage cracking in the center of the passenger cabin – when it makes a hard landing at Juanda International Airport in Sidoarjo, Indonesia, near Surabaya. Some of those aboard suffer minor injuries, but there are no fatalities. Adam Air's other six Boeing 737s are grounded immediately.

=== March ===
- 7 March – Garuda Indonesia Flight 200, a Boeing 737-497, crashes and bursts into flames on landing at Adisucipto International Airport at Yogyakarta on Java in Indonesia, killing 21 of the 140 people on board.
- 12 March – The first two Joint Fighter-17 aircraft are delivered to the Pakistan Air Force.
- 15 March – The Government of Argentina establishes the National Civil Aviation Administration as Argentina's national civil aviation authority. It replaces the Argentine Air Force in this role.
- 17 March – Landing at Samara Kurumoch Airport near Samara, Russia, in heavy fog, UTair Flight 471, a Tupolev Tu-134A3 with 57 people on board, touches down 400 meters (1,300 feet) short of the runway. The left wing separates and the aircraft bounces and flips over. Although no fire breaks out, the crash kills six and injures 20 of the people on board.
- 23 March – Shortly after takeoff from Mogadishu International Airport in Mogadishu, Somalia, during the Battle of Mogadishu, a TransAVIAexport Airlines Ilyushin Il-76 cargo aircraft experiences an engine problem. While it attempts to return to the airport, one of its wings explodes, separates from the aircraft, and falls into the Indian Ocean. The aircraft crashes on the outskirts of Mogadishu, killing all 11 people on board. The Government of Somalia claims that the crash was an accident, while the Government of Belarus and at least one eyewitness said that a surface-to-air missile shot the Il-76 down.
- 27 March – The last Airbus A300 leaves the Airbus assembly line.

=== April ===
- 1 April
  - Japan Airlines, J-Air, JAL Express, JALways, Japan Asia Airways, Japan Transocean Air, LAN Argentina, LAN Ecuador, Malév Hungarian Airlines, and Royal Jordanian join the Oneworld airline alliance. Although Aer Lingus exits the alliance on the same day, the additions expand the Oneworld network to almost 700 airports in nearly 150 countries served by 9,000 daily departures.
  - The Government of Latvia's Aircraft Accident and Incident Investigation Bureau of the Republic of Latvia, the forerunner of the country's Transport Accident and Incident Investigation Bureau, takes on the responsibility for investigating railroad accidents and incidents.
- 17 April – The airline go! begins operations, providing interisland service in Hawaii.
- 21 April – During an air show at Marine Corps Air Station Beaufort, the pilot of an F/A-18 Hornet of the United States Navy (USN) Blue Angels flight demonstration squadron loses consciousness during a low-altitude, high-G maneuver. The F/A-18 crashes, killing him, striking homes and ground vehicles, and injuring eight people on the ground.
- 27 April
  - A Russian military Mil Mi-8 helicopter carrying 15 special forces troops, two liaison officers, and a crew of three crashes in mountainous terrain near Shatoy in Chechnya, killing all 20 people on board. It is the Russian military's deadliest aviation accident since August 2002.
  - The Government of Portugal establishes the National Institute of Civil Aviation of Portugal (Instituto Nacional de Aviação Civil, I.P.) to serve as Portugal's national civil aviation authority. It replaces the National Institute of Civil Aviation (Instituto Nacional de Aviação Civil), which is abolished on this date.
- 30 April
  - The European Union and the United States sign the initial phase of the EU–US Open Skies Agreement at a ceremony in Washington, D.C. The agreement allows any airline of the EU and any airline of the US to fly between any point in the EU and any point in the US. It also allows airlines of the US to fly between points in the EU, and airlines of the EU to fly between the US and non-EU countries like Switzerland. The agreement is to become effective on 30 March 2008.

=== May ===
- During the month, the final assembly of the first Boeing 787 begins.
- 2 May – Compass Airlines, a subcontractor regional airline for Northwest Airlines, begins flight operations with a single Bombardier CRJ200. The first flight is from Washington Dulles International Airport in Fairfax County, Virginia, to Minneapolis-Saint Paul International Airport in Hennepin County, Minnesota.
- 5 May – Kenya Airways Flight 507, a Boeing 737-8AL bound for Nairobi, Kenya, crashes into a swamp just after takeoff from Douala International Airport outside Douala, Cameroon, killing all 114 people on board.

=== June ===
- 3 June – A Paramount Airlines Mil Mi-8 helicopter carrying a Russian crew of two and 20 Togolese football fans returning from watching Togo's national team play that of Sierra Leone crashes near Lungi International Airport in Lungi, Sierra Leone. Togolese Minister of Sport Richard Attipoe is among the dead.
- 21 June – An overloaded Let L-410UVP Turbolet listed as operated by both Free Airlines and the supposedly defunct Karibu Airways crashes just after takeoff from Kamina Airport in Kamina, Democratic Republic of the Congo, and comes to rest inverted in a swamp. The crash kills Mbuyu Mibanga, a member of the National Assembly of the Democratic Republic of the Congo; the other 21 people on board survive, but 12 of them suffer injuries.
- 25 June – PMTair Flight 241, an Antonov An-24B, crashes in southwestern Cambodia, killing all 22 people on board.

=== July ===
- 1 July – The Government of Latvia's Aircraft Accident and Incident Investigation Bureau of the Republic of Latvia is renamed the Transport Accident and Incident Investigation Bureau, reflecting its April assumption of the responsibility for investigating railroad accidents and incidents as well as aviation accidents.
- 8 July – Boeing rolls out the Boeing 787 at the Boeing Everett Factory in Everett, Washington.
- 17 July – TAM Linhas Aéreas Flight 3054, an Airbus A320-233, fails to slow down normally upon landing at São Paulo–Congonhas Airport in São Paulo, Brazil. It overruns the runway, crosses a road, crashes into a four-story TAM Express building, and explodes, starting a large fire. The deadliest aviation accident in Brazil's history, the crash kills all 187 people on the airliner and 12 people on the ground.
- 27 July – As five television news helicopters cover a police pursuit in Phoenix, Arizona, two of them – both Eurocopter AS350 AStar helicopters, one belonging to KNXV-TV and the other to KTVK, and each with two people on board – collide in mid-air above Steele Indian School Park and crash. All four people in the two helicopters die.
- 28 July – American aerobatic pilot Jim LeRoy is killed in the crash of his Pitts S2S Bulldog II during an aerobatic performance at the Dayton Air Show at Dayton International Airport outside Dayton, Ohio.

=== August ===
- 8 August
  - Virgin America begins operations.
  - At Edwards Air Force Base, United States Secretary of the Air Force Michael W. Wynne announces the certification of B-52H Stratofortresses of the United States Air Force (USAF) to fly on a fuel made of a blend of conventional JP-8 jet fuel and Fischer–Tropsch fuel made from coal. The U.S. Air Force next plans to seek the same certification for its C-17 Globemaster III aircraft.
- 9 August – Air Moorea Flight 1121, a DHC-6 Twin Otter, suddenly noses over shortly after taking off from Moorea Airport in French Polynesia and crashes into the Pacific Ocean, killing all 20 people on board.
- 20 August – China Airlines Flight 120, a Boeing 737-809 with 165 people on board, catches fire after landing at Naha Airport on Okinawa, Japan. There are no fatalities; three people on the aircraft and one member of the ground crew are injured.
- 20 August – Loch Lomond Seaplanes launches scheduled services from Glasgow Seaplane Terminal to Oban in Scotland.
- 29–30 August
- A nuclear weapons incident occurs when six AGM-129 ACM cruise missiles, each loaded with a W80-1 variable yield nuclear warhead, are mistakenly loaded onto a USAF B-52H Stratofortress at Minot Air Force Base, North Dakota, on 29 August, and flown to Barksdale Air Force Base, Louisiana, on 30 August in violation of various mandatory security precautions for nuclear weapons. The incident has wide-ranging repercussions, including reforms in the handling procedures for nuclear weapons and the U.S. Air Force's creation in October 2008 of a Global Strike Command to control all USAF nuclear bombers, nuclear missiles, and nuclear-associated personnel.

=== September ===
- 3 September – American aviation adventurer Steve Fossett disappears during a flight in a Bellanca Super Decathlon from the Flying-M Ranch near Smith Valley, Nevada. The wreckage of his plane and his remains are not found until October 2008, allowing a determination that he had crashed into a granite cliff 7 miles (11 km) from Mammoth Lakes, California, at an altitude of 10,000 feet (3,000 meters).
- 15 September – Scottish rally driver Colin MacRae and his five-year-old son are among four people killed when the Eurocopter AS350 Écureuil he is piloting crashes near Lanark, Scotland.
- 16 September – One-Two-GO Airlines Flight 269, a McDonnell Douglas MD-82 registered as HS-OMG, carrying 123 passengers and 7 crew members, strikes an embankment adjacent to the runway while making a failed attempt to initiate a go-around at Phuket International Airport in Phuket, Thailand. It crashes and catches fire, killing 90 of the 130 people on board.

=== October ===
- 4 October – An Antonov An-26 leased from Africa One, operated by El Sam Airlift, and chartered by Malift Air loses a propeller shortly after taking off from N'djili Airport in Kinshasa, Democratic Republic of the Congo. One of its wings strikes an obstacle and detaches before the aircraft crashes into a market and comes to rest in a house. The crash kills 20 people on the aircraft, leaving one or two survivors, and 31 people on the ground. At least 30 more people suffer injuries. The country's president, Joseph Kabila, fires its transport minister after the accident.
- 15 October – Airbus delivers its first A380 superjumbo jet and Singapore Airlines becomes the first airline to take delivery of it.
- 26 October – Philippine Airlines Flight 475, an Airbus A320-214, overruns the runway on landing at Bancasi Airport in Butuan, the Philippines, and is destroyed when it plows into the tropical rainforest beyond the end of the runway. All 154 people on board survive.

=== November ===
- 2 November – Air Asia X, a Malaysian low-cost, long-haul airline and sister company of AirAsia, begins flight operations. Its first flight is from Kuala Lumpur International Airport in Kuala Lumpur, Malaysia, to Gold Coast Airport in Australia.
- 7 November – Nationwide Airlines Flight 723, a 737-200, had its right engine detached from the airframe during its rotation. The pilots managed to safely maneuver the aircraft into landing at Cape Town International Airport, the airport which the flight had departed from, saving all 112 occupants onboard without injury.
- 28 November – German aviator Elly Beinhorn dies aged 100.
- 30 November – Atlasjet Flight 4203, a McDonnell Douglas MD-83, crashes on a hill outside Keçiborlu, Turkey, and breaks into two pieces, killing all 57 people on board.

=== December ===
- Aer Lingus begins flight operations from Belfast International Airport in Northern Ireland, its first base outside the Republic of Ireland.
- 12 December – Air China and Shanghai Airlines become the first major People's Republic of China airlines to join Star Alliance.
- 21 December – Comac rolls out the ACAC ARJ21 Advanced Regional Jet.
- 30 December – A Boeing 737-300 operating on charter as TAROM Flight 3107 with 123 people on board, strikes a maintenance car on the runway while taking off in thick fog at Henri Coandă International Airport at Otopeni, Romania. The plane is written off, but there are no injuries or fatalities.

== First flights ==
=== January ===
- 23 January – Lockheed CATBird

=== February ===
- 27 February – Bell 429 GlobalRanger

=== April ===
- 4 April – Diamond DA50
- 14 April – Comp Air CA-12

=== June ===
- 28 June – Rans S-19 Venterra
- 29 June – Piasecki X-49

=== July ===
- 2 July – Eclipse 400
- 6 July – Epic Victory
- 14 July – Dornier S-Ray 007
- 20 July – Boeing X-48
- 26 July – Embraer Phenom 100 Executive Jet (in São José dos Campos, Brazil)

=== August ===
- 3 August – Northrop Grumman E-2D Hawkeye
- 20 August – Freedom Aviation Phoenix
- 22 August – Lisa Akoya
- 23 August – Hawker 750

=== September ===
- 13 September – Tecnam P2006T
- 28 September – Kawasaki P-1
- 30 September – DuPont Aerospace DP-1

=== October ===
- 26 October – Embraer Lineage 1000

=== December ===
- 21 December – OMA SUD Skycar

== Entered service ==
- Sukhoi Su-30MKM with the Royal Malaysian Air Force

=== October ===
- 25 October – The Airbus A380 with Singapore Airlines completed its first commercial flight, flying between Singapore and Sydney, Australia.

== Retirements ==
- 25 October – The RQ-2 Pioneer by the United States Armed Forces; its last American operator is USN Composite Squadron 6 (VC-6))

== Deadliest crash ==
The deadliest crash of this year was TAM Airlines Flight 3054, a Airbus A320 which crashed in a runway overrun in São Paulo, Brazil on 17 July, killing all 187 people on board, as well as 12 on the ground.
