= Flag carrier =

Transport company with preferential status

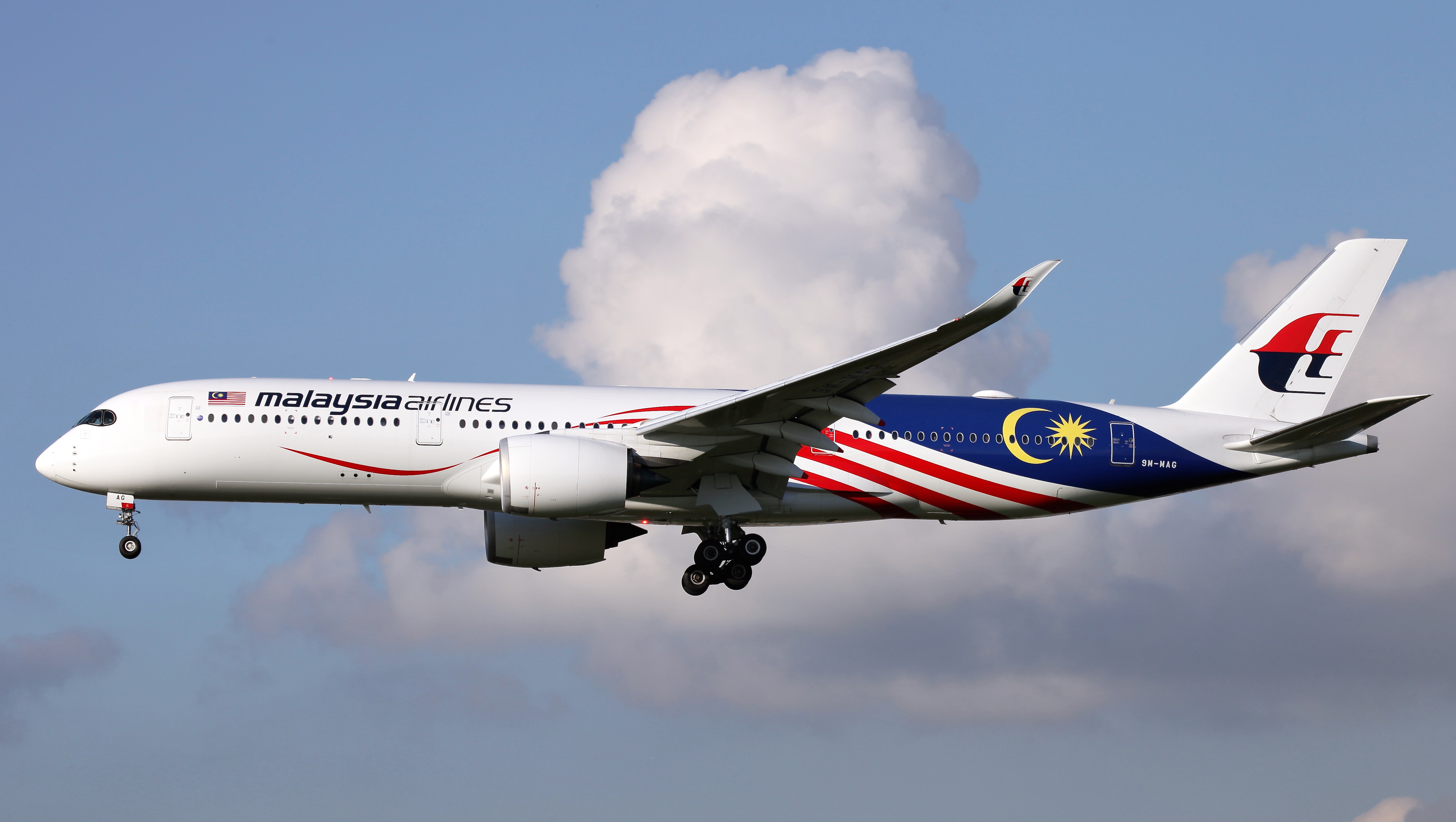
Airbus A350 of Malaysia Airlines, the flag carrier of Malaysia, with the Malaysian flag depicted at the front of the aircraft and across the fuselage.

A flag carrier is a transport company, such as an airline or shipping company, that, being locally registered in a given sovereign state, enjoys preferential rights or privileges accorded by that government for international operations.

Historically, the term was used to refer to airlines owned by the government of their home country and associated with the national identity of that country. Such an airline may also be known as a national airline or a national carrier, although this can have different legal meanings in some countries. Today, it is any international airline with a strong connection to its home country or that represents its home country internationally, regardless of whether it is government-owned.

Flag carriers may also be known as such due to laws requiring aircraft or ships to display the state flag of the country of their registry. For example, under the law of the United States, a U.S. flag air carrier is any airline that holds a certificate under Section 401 of the Federal Aviation Act of 1958 (i.e., any U.S.-based airline operating internationally), and any ship registered in the United States is known as a U.S. flag vessel.

== Background ==
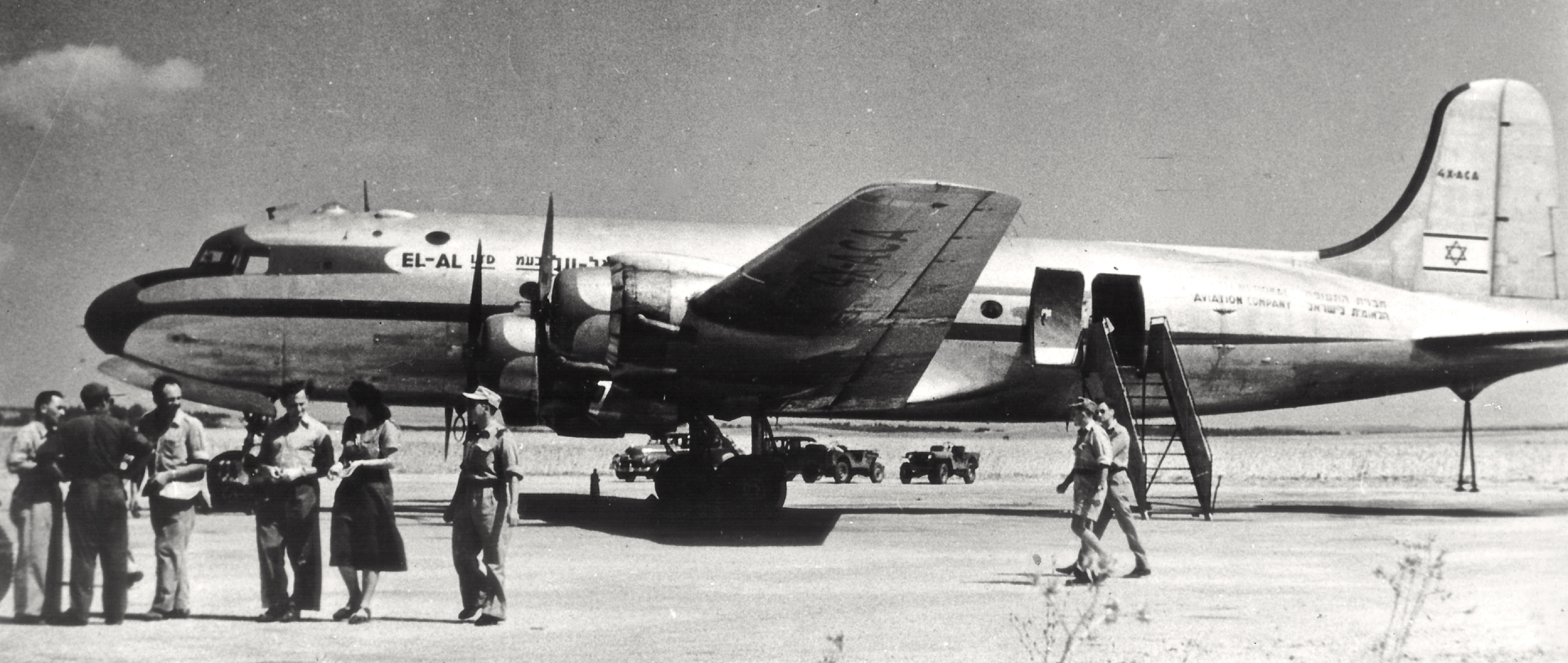
A Douglas DC-4 owned and operated by El Al, the flag carrier of Israel, in 1948

The term "flag carrier" is a legacy of the early days of commercial aviation when governments often took the lead by establishing state-owned airlines because of the high capital costs of running them. However, not all such airlines were government-owned; Pan Am, TWA, Cathay Pacific, Union de Transports Aériens, Canadian Pacific Air Lines and Olympic Airlines were all privately owned, but were considered to be flag carriers as they were the "main national airline" and often a sign of their country's presence abroad.

The heavily regulated aviation industry also meant aviation rights are often negotiated between governments, denying airlines access to an open market. These Bilateral Air Transport Agreements similar to the Bermuda I and Bermuda II agreements specify rights awardable only to locally registered airlines, forcing some governments to jump-start airlines to avoid being disadvantaged in the face of foreign competition. Some countries also establish flag carriers such as Israel's El Al or Lebanon's Middle East Airlines for nationalist reasons or to aid the country's economy, particularly in the area of tourism.

In many cases, governments would directly assist in the growth of their flag carriers typically through subsidies and other fiscal incentives. The establishment of competitors in the form of other locally registered airlines may be prohibited or heavily regulated to avoid direct competition. Even where privately run airlines may be allowed to be established, the flag carriers may still be accorded priority, especially in the apportionment of aviation rights to local or international markets.

Near the end of the twentieth century, many of these airlines have been corporatized as a public company or a state-owned enterprise, while others have been completely privatized. The aviation industry has also been gradually deregulated and liberalized, permitting greater freedoms of the air particularly in the United States and in the European Union with the signing of the Open Skies agreement. One of the features of such agreements is the right of a country to designate multiple airlines to serve international routes with the result that there is no single "flag carrier".

== List of flag-carrying airlines ==
The chart below lists airlines considered to be a "flag carrier", based on current or former state ownership or other verifiable designation as a national airline.

| Country or region | Airline | Details of current state ownership | Details of former state ownership |
|---|---|---|---|
| Afghanistan | Ariana Afghan Airlines | State-owned | |
| Algeria | Air Algérie | State-owned | |
| Angola | TAAG Angola Airlines | Majority | |
| Argentina | Aerolíneas Argentinas | State-owned | |
| Aruba | Aruba Airlines | None | |
| Australia | Qantas | None | State-owned between 1947 and 1995. |
| Austria | Austrian Airlines | None – owned by Lufthansa | State-owned until 5 December 2008. |
| Azerbaijan | Azerbaijan Airlines | State-owned | |
| Bahamas | Bahamasair | State-owned | |
| Bahrain | Gulf Air | State-owned | |
| Bangladesh | Biman Bangladesh Airlines | Public limited company | State-owned until 23 July 2007. |
| Belarus | Belavia | State-owned | |
| Belgium | Brussels Airlines | None – owned by Lufthansa | State-owned in its original incarnation (SN Brussels Airlines). |
| Bermuda | BermudAir | None | |
| Bhutan | Druk Air | State-owned | |
| Bolivia | Boliviana de Aviación | State-owned | |
| Botswana | Air Botswana | State-owned | |
| Brunei | Royal Brunei Airlines | State-owned | |
| Bulgaria | Bulgaria Air | Minority state-owned (0.01%) | |
| Burkina Faso | Air Burkina | State-owned | |
| Cambodia | Air Cambodia | Minority (30%) | |
| Cameroon | Camair-Co | State-owned | |
| Canada | Air Canada | None | State-owned until privatization in 1989. Minority (est. 6.4%) between April 2021 and December 2024. |
| Cape Verde | Cabo Verde Airlines | Majority (90%) | |
| Cayman Islands | Cayman Airways | State-owned | |
| Chile | LATAM Chile | None | State-owned until September 1989. |
| China | Air China | Majority (51.7%): 40.98% through CNAHC and 10.72% through CNACG | State-owned until 2004. |
| Colombia | Avianca | None | |
| Costa Rica | Avianca Costa Rica | | |
| Croatia | Croatia Airlines | Majority (98%) | |
| Cuba | Cubana de Aviación | State-owned | |
| Cyprus | Cyprus Airways | None – 40% owned by Malta-based SJC Group | |
| DR Congo | Congo Airways | State-owned | |
| Denmark | Scandinavian Airlines | Minority (~26%) state-owned by Ministry of Finance of Denmark | SAS was partly owned by the governments of Denmark, Norway and Sweden. SAS is the flag carrier for all three nations. |
| Norway | Scandinavian Airlines | Minority (~26%) state-owned by Ministry of Finance of Denmark | SAS was partly owned by the governments of Denmark, Norway and Sweden. SAS is the flag carrier for all three nations. |
| Sweden | Scandinavian Airlines | Minority (~26%) state-owned by Ministry of Finance of Denmark | SAS was partly owned by the governments of Denmark, Norway and Sweden. SAS is the flag carrier for all three nations. |
| Djibouti | Air Djibouti | Joint venture | |
| Dominican Republic | Arajet | None | |
| Egypt | Egyptair | State-owned | |
| Equatorial Guinea | CEIBA Intercontinental | State-owned | |
| Eritrea | Eritrean Airlines | State-owned | |
| Eswatini | Eswatini Air | | |
| Ethiopia | Ethiopian Airlines | State-owned | |
| Faroe Islands | Atlantic Airways | | |
| Fiji | Fiji Airways | Majority (51%) | |
| Finland | Finnair | Majority (55.8%) | |
| France | Air France | Minority state-ownership of Air France–KLM | |
| French Polynesia | Air Tahiti Nui | Majority | |
| Gabon | FlyGabon | Majority state-owned (56%) | |
| Georgia | Georgian Airways | None | |
| Germany | Lufthansa | None | State-owned until 1994; remaining government shares were sold in 1997. Minority (20.05%) in the Lufthansa Group acquired in 2020 was sold in 2022. |
| Greece | Aegean Airlines | | The Greek Government had minority shares of the airline due to a COVID bailout. The airline bought back government shares in 2023 |
| Greenland | Air Greenland | State-owned | Previously owned by Scandinavian Airlines and Ministry of Finance of Denmark. |
| Guernsey | Aurigny | State-owned | |
| Hong Kong | Cathay Pacific | Minority (~28.72% through Air China) | Hong Kong Government owned 6.8% of shares from 2020 to 2024. |
| Iceland | Icelandair | None – owned by Icelandair Group | |
| India | Air India | None – owned by Tata Group (74.9%) and Singapore Airlines (25.1%) | State-owned until November 2021. |
| Indonesia | Garuda Indonesia | Majority (60.54%) | |
| Iran | Iran Air | State-owned | |
| Iraq | Iraqi Airways | | |
| Ireland | Aer Lingus | None – owned by IAG | State-owned until September 2006. |
| Israel | El Al | Minority (~1.1%) | State-owned until June 2004. |
| Italy | ITA Airways | Majority (59%) | Succeeded Alitalia starting from 15 October 2021 |
| Ivory Coast | Air Côte d'Ivoire | State-owned | |
| Jamaica | Caribbean Airlines | Minority (16%) | |
| Trinidad and Tobago | Caribbean Airlines | Majority (84%) | |
| Japan | All Nippon Airways | None | |
| Japan | Japan Airlines | None | State-owned until 1987. |
| Jordan | Royal Jordanian | | |
| Kazakhstan | Air Astana | Majority (51%) | |
| Kenya | Kenya Airways | Minority (29.8%) | |
| Kiribati | Air Kiribati | | |
| Kuwait | Kuwait Airways | State-owned | |
| Kyrgyzstan | Asman Airlines | State-owned | |
| Laos | Lao Airlines | State-owned | |
| Latvia | airBaltic | Majority (80.05%) | |
| Lebanon | Middle East Airlines | Majority (99%) | |
| Libya | Afriqiyah Airways | State-owned | |
| Libya | Libyan Airlines | State-owned | |
| Luxembourg | Luxair | Majority (73.86%) | |
| Macau | Air Macau | Minority (5%) | |
| Madagascar | Madagascar Airlines | Majority | |
| Malawi | Malawian Airlines | Majority (51%) | |
| Malaysia | Malaysia Airlines | State-owned through Khazanah Nasional | |
| Maldives | Maldivian | | |
| Malta | KM Malta Airlines | Majority | |
| Marshall Islands | Air Marshall Islands | | |
| Mauritania | Mauritania Airlines | State-owned | |
| Mauritius | Air Mauritius | | |
| Mexico | Aeroméxico | None | State-owned until 2007. |
| Mongolia | MIAT Mongolian Airlines | State-owned | |
| Montenegro | Air Montenegro | State-owned | |
| Morocco | Royal Air Maroc | State-owned | |
| Mozambique | LAM Mozambique Airlines | State-owned | |
| Myanmar | Myanmar National Airlines | State-owned | |
| Nauru | Nauru Airlines | State-owned | |
| Nepal | Nepal Airlines | State-owned | |
| Netherlands | KLM | Minority state-ownership of Air France–KLM | |
| New Caledonia | Aircalin | Majority (99%) | |
| New Zealand | Air New Zealand | Majority (53%) | State-owned until 1989, partially re-nationalized in 2001. |
| North Korea | Air Koryo | State-owned | |
| Oman | Oman Air | Majority | |
| Pakistan | Pakistan International Airlines | Minority state owned (25%) | State owned until December 2025. 75% stakes were sold to Arif Habib Corporation |
| Panama | Copa Airlines | None | |
| Papua New Guinea | Air Niugini | | |
| Paraguay | LATAM Paraguay | | |
| Peru | LATAM Perú | | |
| Philippines | Philippine Airlines | | State-owned until 1992. |
| Poland | LOT Polish Airlines | State-owned | |
| Portugal | TAP Air Portugal | Majority (72%) | |
| Qatar | Qatar Airways | State-owned | |
| Réunion | Air Austral | | |
| Romania | TAROM | Majority (97.22%) | |
| Russia | Aeroflot | Majority (51%) | |
| Rwanda | RwandAir | State-owned | |
| Samoa | Samoa Airways | State-owned | |
| São Tomé and Príncipe | STP Airways | None | |
| Saudi Arabia | Saudia | Majority | |
| Saudi Arabia | Riyadh Air | State-owned by the Public Investment Fund | |
| Senegal | Air Senegal | | |
| Serbia | Air Serbia | Majority (51%) | |
| Seychelles | Air Seychelles | State-owned (100%) | |
| Solomon Islands | Solomon Airlines | State-owned | |
| Sierra Leone | Air Sierra Leone | | |
| Singapore | Singapore Airlines | Majority (54.5% through Temasek Holdings) | |
| South Africa | South African Airways | State-owned | |
| South Korea | Korean Air | None – owned by Hanjin | State-owned until 1969. |
| Spain | Iberia | None – owned by IAG | |
| Sri Lanka | SriLankan Airlines | State-owned | |
| Sudan | Sudan Airways | State-owned | |
| Suriname | Surinam Airways | State-owned | |
| Switzerland | Swiss International Air Lines | None – owned by Lufthansa | |
| Syria | Syrian Air | State-owned | |
| Taiwan | China Airlines | Majority | State-owned until 1991. 51.28% held by non-profit Civic Aviation Development Foundation. |
| Timor-Leste | Aero Dili | | |
| Tanzania | Air Tanzania | State-owned | |
| Thailand | Thai Airways International | Minority (47.86%) | |
| Tunisia | Tunisair | Majority | |
| Turkey | Turkish Airlines | Minority (49%) | |
| Turkmenistan | Turkmenistan Airlines | State-owned | |
| Uganda | Uganda Airlines | | |
| United Arab Emirates | Etihad Airways | State-owned by the Government of Abu Dhabi | |
| United Arab Emirates | Emirates | State-owned by the Government of Dubai through the ICD. | |
| United Kingdom | British Airways | None – owned by IAG | State-owned until 1987. |
| Uzbekistan | Uzbekistan Airways | Majority | |
| Vanuatu | Air Vanuatu | State-owned | |
| Venezuela | Conviasa | State-owned | |
| Vietnam | Vietnam Airlines | Majority (86.2%) | |
| Yemen | Yemenia | Majority | |
| Zambia | Zambia Airways | | |
| Zimbabwe | Air Zimbabwe | State-owned | |

== See also ==
- List of charter airlines
- List of low-cost airlines
