= Bermuda II Agreement =

1977 agreement between the United Kingdom and United States

Bermuda II was a bilateral air transport agreement between the governments of the United Kingdom and the United States signed on 23 July 1977 as a renegotiation of the original 1946 Bermuda air services agreement. A new open skies agreement was signed by the United States and the European Union (EU) (of which the United Kingdom was part) on 30 April 2007 and came into effect on 30 March 2008, thus replacing Bermuda II.

The original 1946 Bermuda agreement took its name from the island where UK and US transport officials met to negotiate a new, inter-governmental air services agreement. That agreement, which was (relative to modern agreements) highly restrictive at the insistence of the British negotiators who feared that "giving in" to US demands for a "free-for-all" would lead to the then financially superior US airlines' total domination of the global air transport industry, was the world's first bilateral air services agreement. It became a blueprint for all subsequent air services agreements.

Bermuda II was revised several times since its signing, most recently in 1995. Although Bermuda II was much less restrictive than the original Bermuda agreement it replaced, it was widely regarded as a highly restrictive agreement that contrasted with the principle of open skies against the background of continuing liberalization of the legal framework governing the air transport industry in various parts of the world.

== Historical background ==
In July 1976, Edmund Dell, the then new UK Secretary of State for Trade, renounced the original Bermuda Agreement of 1946 and initiated bilateral negotiations with his US counterparts on a new air services agreement, which resulted in the Bermuda II treaty of 1977.

The reason for this was that there was no provision in the original 1946 Bermuda agreement that would have allowed British Caledonian (BCal), then the UK's foremost wholly privately owned, independent international scheduled airline, to use the licences the UK Civil Aviation Authority (CAA) had awarded it in 1972 to begin daily scheduled services from its London Gatwick base to Houston and Atlanta. (These cities were not nominated as "gateway cities" in the original Bermuda agreement.) In addition, there was no provision in the original Bermuda agreement that would have allowed Laker Airways to use the licence the UK's Air Transport Licensing Board (ATLB), the CAA's predecessor, had awarded it the same year to commence a daily "Skytrain" operation between London Stansted and New York.

== Original agreement (1977) ==
Under the original 1977 version of Bermuda II, British Airways, Pan Am and Trans World Airlines were the only carriers allowed to operate flights between London Heathrow and the United States.

Air India, El Al, Iran Air and Kuwait Airways were permitted to continue exercising their so-called "fifth freedom" traffic rights from Heathrow to John F. Kennedy International Airport (JFK), which they had already enjoyed under the original Bermuda agreement. (Both El Al and Iran Air stopped exercising these rights. The former decided that it made better economic sense to fly non-stop between Tel Aviv and New York. The latter's US traffic rights were withdrawn in the aftermath of the 1979 Iranian hostage crisis.) Similarly, Air New Zealand was allowed to continue using its fifth freedom rights between London and Los Angeles.

The extensive fifth freedom rights US carriers used to enjoy from the UK to other European countries were restricted to a few routes from London Heathrow to what used to be West Germany (including West Berlin) in the days prior to German reunification. In the early 1990s, United Airlines used to fly between Heathrow, Berlin, Hamburg and Munich (United had acquired these traffic rights along with Pan Am's transatlantic rights to and from Heathrow for US$1 billion in 1990). A few years earlier, Trans World Airlines flew between London and Brussels but, unlike United, did not have traffic rights to carry local traffic between the two cities.

American and British regulatory authorities needed to approve every airline's capacity and pricing ahead of each operating season. Each country could refuse traffic rights to a carrier it was not satisfied with, particularly with regard to ownership and/or control. Only a specified number of US "gateway cities" could be served by both UK and US carriers from London Heathrow as well as London Gatwick.

Only the following US gateway cities could be served non-stop from Heathrow: Baltimore, Boston, Chicago–O'Hare, Detroit, Los Angeles, Miami, New York–JFK, Newark, Anchorage, Minneapolis/St. Paul, Philadelphia, San Francisco, Seattle/Tacoma, and Washington–Dulles. Anchorage and Minneapolis/St. Paul, held dormant authorities to use Heathrow as their London terminal, grandfathered from use during the original Bermuda Agreement; but could only be operated non-stop by a British carrier. As such, Anchorage remained dormant during the latter years of Bermuda II, and Minneapolis featured service only to London Gatwick, as its operating carrier (Northwest Airlines) did not have the authority to operate into Heathrow.

Other airports in the United States had to be served from Gatwick rather than Heathrow: these eventually included Atlanta, Charlotte, Cincinnati, Cleveland, Dallas/Fort Worth, Houston–Intercontinental, Las Vegas, Nashville, New Orleans, Orlando, Pittsburgh, Raleigh/Durham, St. Louis, and Tampa.

A provision existed that allowed any Heathrow-authorised British carrier operating as the sole carrier between London Gatwick and any US city to switch that service to Heathrow as long as the incumbent airline had demonstrated its ability to carry a minimum of 300,000 non-stop passengers (both transfer and point-to-point) between that city and London, and vice versa, over a period of two consecutive calendar years. Using this method, British Airways was able to transfer Denver, Kolkata, San Diego and Phoenix-Sky Harbor services from Gatwick to Heathrow in 2002.

Bermuda II continued and expanded the principle of "dual designation", i.e. the right to designate two UK airlines as well as two US carriers as "flag carriers" on the same routes, which already existed on the London–New York and London–Los Angeles routes under the original Bermuda treaty.

Under the new agreement, BCal had its licences to commence scheduled services from its Gatwick base to both Houston and Atlanta confirmed and was designated as the UK's exclusive flag carrier on both routes. It also obtained a licence and sole UK flag carrier status to commence scheduled services from Gatwick to Dallas/Fort Worth. In addition, BCal obtained a licence and sole UK flag carrier status to commence scheduled all cargo flights between Gatwick and Houston – including an optional stop-over at Manchester or Prestwick in either direction.

The UK Government chose to designate Laker Airways rather than BCal as the second UK flag carrier to New York to enable that airline to inaugurate its long-planned "Skytrain" operation on that route.

Moreover, both sides agreed to continue dual designation, i.e. designating two UK flag carriers as well as two US flag carriers, on the London–New York and London–Los Angeles routes. The principle of dual designation was extended to another two high-volume routes. The UK side chose to designate a second carrier on London–Miami, while the US side chose London–Boston for the same purpose. This meant that a second British airline was permitted to commence scheduled services on the former route, whereas another American carrier could do the same on the latter route. The UK government chose to designate Laker Airways as the second UK flag carrier on the Los Angeles and Miami routes, whilst the US government decided to designate Northwest as the second US flag carrier on London–Boston. (Pan Am and TWA continued in their role as the two designated US flag carriers between London and New York as well as London and Los Angeles respectively.)

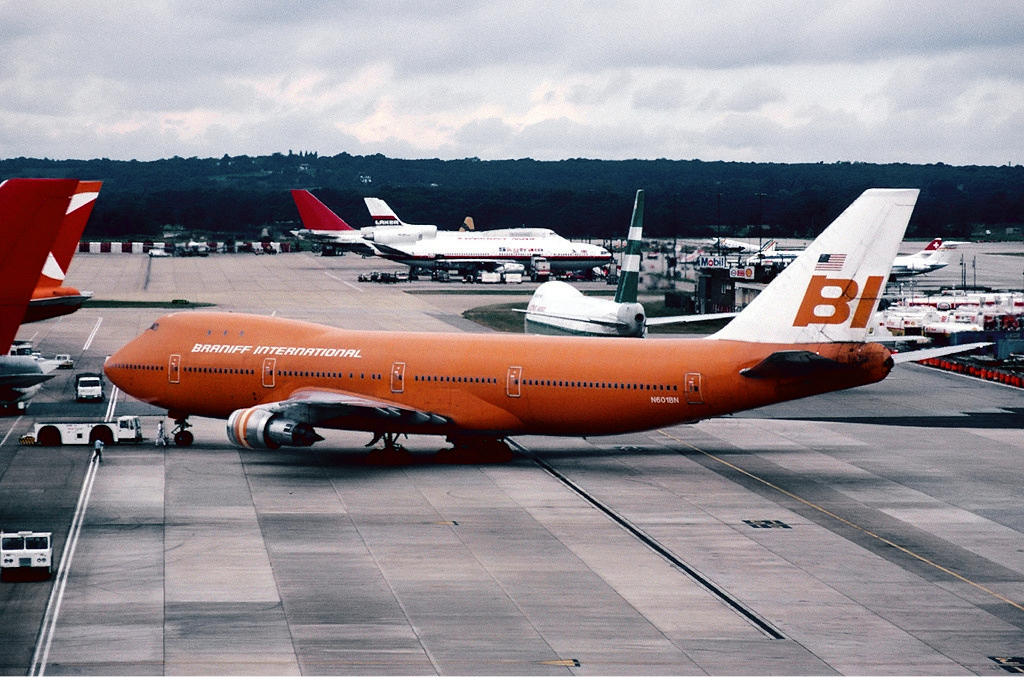
A Braniff Boeing 747 at London Gatwick in 1981. Braniff was among the US carriers using Gatwick instead of Heathrow for its London services under the terms of the Bermuda II air agreement. Between 1978 and 1982, it operated daily flights to Gatwick from Dallas/Fort Worth.

During the Bermuda II negotiations, the UK side succeeded in having inserted into the new air services agreement a clause stating that Gatwick – rather than Heathrow – was to be nominated as the designated US flag carrier's London gateway airport whenever BCal was going to be the sole designated UK flag carrier on the same route. This clause was meant to support the growth of BCal's scheduled operation at Gatwick as well as to redress the competitive imbalance between it and its much bigger, more powerful rivals.

The UK side furthermore succeeded in negotiating a three-year "exclusivity" period for the incumbent operator on any new route with their US counterparts.

For Gatwick-based BCal, this meant that it did not have to face any competitor that was using Heathrow, a more accessible airport with a bigger catchment area and a far greater number of passengers connecting between flights, on any of the new routes it was planning to launch to the US. It also meant that it had any new route to the US completely to itself for the first three years of operation, which most airline industry analysts reckon is sufficiently long for a brand-new scheduled air service to become profitable.

At British insistence, Bermuda II furthermore contained clauses that made it illegal for any airline operating scheduled flights between the UK and the US to resort to predatory pricing or capacity dumping. Air fares were only approved if they reflected the actual cost of providing these services. Similarly, capacity increases were sanctioned on a reciprocal basis only. The reason for insisting on the inclusion of these provisions in the Bermuda II agreement was to prevent the much bigger, better financed and commercially far more aggressive US carriers from undercutting BCal with "loss-leading" fares cross-subsidised with profits those carriers' vast domestic networks generated as well as to stop them from "marginalising" the UK carrier by adding capacity far in excess of what the market could sustain.

Bermuda II also provided routing restrictions for flights between the United States and various British overseas colonies including Bermuda, various Caribbean islands and Hong Kong as well as the Indian subcontinent, where airports such as Hyderabad, Bangalore, Kochi, Colombo, Male could only be served from Gatwick.

== 1981 revision ==
Both sides agreed to automatically nominate Gatwick as the gateway airport for London for any London–US route that did not already exist under the original 1946 Bermuda agreement. When all available routes between London Heathrow/Gatwick and the US were taken, any carrier wishing to start a new route to a US gateway city not served from either of London's two main airports at the time of application for route authority needed to drop another route. In addition, any such change could only become effective when there was unanimous agreement between both the UK and US governments. Failure of both nations' governments to agree to such changes prevented the introduction of additional non-stop flights, including between London and Honolulu, Portland (OR), and Salt Lake City. British Airways did successfully gain approval in 1982 to operate nonstop to New Orleans from Gatwick, as an intermediate stop on its Lockheed L-1011 TriStar service to Mexico City. This gateway was later omitted as the performance capability of newer Boeing 747s allowed the airline to operate the round trip route nonstop, despite the Mexican city's high altitude. BA would not resume its New Orleans nonstop operation until 2017, long after the cessation of Bermuda II.

== 1991 revision ==
In the wake of the bankruptcies of TWA and Pan Am, the carriers authorized to operate Heathrow routes were replaced by British Airways and Virgin Atlantic on the UK side and American Airlines and United Airlines on the US side.

Pan Am had previously sold its Heathrow traffic rights to United in 1990, but British negotiators initially stated that they would not allow United to receive the transferred route authority citing Bermuda II's specific designation of Pan Am; they furthermore stated that United was not a successor airline because it was not assuming ownership of Pan Am.

Virgin Atlantic's access rights to Heathrow under Bermuda II derived from the fact that the UK was not using its entitlement to nominate a second carrier to match the two US carriers' presence at London's premier airport. The UK Government therefore took advantage of the abolition of the London [Air] Traffic Distribution Rules, which had confined Virgin's London operations to Gatwick, as well as of the US Government's intention to have American and United replace TWA and Pan Am as the designated US flag carriers at Heathrow to help Virgin establish a presence at that airport as well.

These access restrictions were also the reason BA (as BCal's legal heir between London and Houston, Dallas, and Atlanta) and American (as Braniff Airways's legal heir between Dallas/Fort Worth and London) were compelled to continue using Gatwick as their UK gateway for all non-stop scheduled operations between London and Houston, Dallas/Fort Worth, and Atlanta as long as Bermuda II remained in force.

Code sharing also became possible under the 1991 agreement. The US later approved Continental Airlines to fly to London Heathrow, but British refusal to endorse the US position prevented Continental from exercising this route authority. However, Continental succeeded in obtaining UK permission to enter into a codeshare agreement with Virgin Atlantic, which placed Continental's flight numbers in addition to Virgin's on some of the latter's Heathrow and Gatwick flights.

== 1995 revision ==
Fare and route restrictions governing all scheduled air services serving airports other than Heathrow or Gatwick were lifted. (This partial liberalisation came about as a UK concession to the US to help BA gain approval for its code-share alliance with US Air. As a result, access restrictions that originally covered all London airports were lifted at Luton and Stansted. This, in turn, enabled the now defunct "new generation", all-business class carriers such as Eos, Maxjet and Silverjet to enter the lucrative London–New York business travel market by choosing Stansted and Luton rather than Heathrow or Gatwick as their UK departure/arrival airports). Continental Airlines also took advantage of this liberalisation by starting service to a number of important regional UK airports, including Bristol, Birmingham, Manchester, Edinburgh, Glasgow and Belfast. Continental furthermore introduced non-stop service to Stansted from Newark in 2001, but this was withdrawn in the industry downturn after the September 11 terrorist attacks.

== 1997 revision ==
Flights between the United States and Hong Kong were removed from the scope of Bermuda II in 1997, when sovereignty over Hong Kong was transferred to the People's Republic of China.

== Aftermath ==
Liberalisation of the Bermuda II agreement was the declared intention of both countries since 1995. However, bilateral negotiations between the UK and the US were unsuccessful.

Subsequently, matters were complicated by the European Court of Justice's judgment to declare all bilateral agreements between individual EU member states and the US illegal. Such agreements were deemed to violate the EU's Common Aviation Market.

The main sticking point that had prevented the conclusion of a new, transatlantic Common Aviation Area agreement between the EU and the US was that the UK and most other European countries viewed the US version of open skies as too restrictive. The US open skies template denied foreign airlines cabotage rights, i.e. the right to operate wholly within the US domestic market without entering into a code-share agreement with a US carrier. It also denied foreign airlines the right to acquire stakes in their US counterparts with the intention of exercising boardroom control.

On 2 March 2007 a draft agreement was reached by negotiators from the European Commission and the US that proposed to drop Bermuda II's restrictions preventing US flag carriers, other than American and United, from flying to Heathrow. This new Air Transport Agreement between the EU and the US was approved unanimously by the EU Transport Council on 22 March 2007 and replaced Bermuda II with effect from 30 March 2008. It also paved the way for either country to allow airlines headquartered in other EU countries to enter the UK-US air transport market. On 3 October 2007, Britain concluded its first fully liberal open skies agreement with Singapore, allowing Singapore Airlines to fly completely unrestricted from any point in the United Kingdom, including Heathrow, to any other destination, including the United States and domestic destinations, effective 30 March 2008.
