= Karibu =

Karibu may refer to:

- Karibu Airways, a defunct Congolese airline
- Karibu (album), 2008 album by Lionel Loueke
