= Fifth Freedom =

Fifth Freedom may refer to:

- Economic freedom, which U.S. President Herbert Hoover defined as a fifth freedom.
- Freedoms of the air § Fifth freedom, the right for an airline to fly between two foreign countries during flights while the flight originates or ends in one's own country.
- License to kill (concept), described as the "Fifth Freedom" in the context of the Tom Clancy's Splinter Cell series of video games.
