= 2016 Blue Angels Tennessee crash =

2016 aviation accident

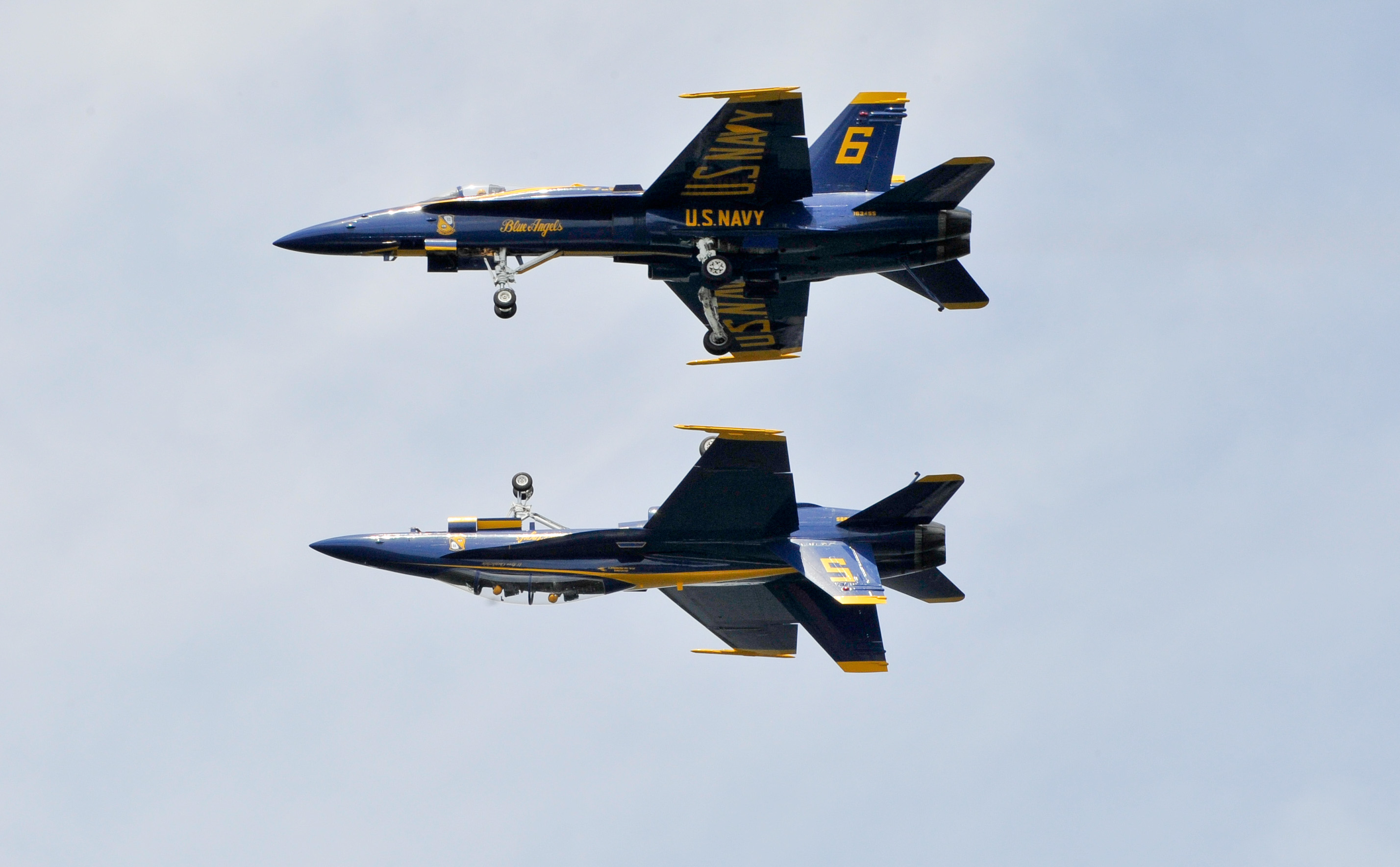
- Lt. Ryan Chamberlain and Cpt. Jeff Kuss on 25 May 2016, during the Naval Academy Airshow. Kuss, who was Blue Angel No. 6, died roughly a week later in Smyrna in a fatal crash.

Accident
- Date: 2 June 2016
- Summary: Pilot Jeff Kuss suffered from fatigue and made an error during a Split-S maneuver, being too low and too fast to finish the maneuver, resulting in a fatal crash.
- Site: Smyrna, Tennessee, U.S.
- Total fatalities: 1

Aircraft
- Aircraft type: McDonnell Douglas F/A-18 Hornet
- Operator: Blue Angels
- Registration: 163455
- Crew: 1
- Fatalities: 1
- Survivors: 0

Ground casualties
- Ground fatalities: 0
- Ground injuries: 0

The 2016 Blue Angels Tennessee crash occurred on Thursday, 2 June 2016, when the Number 6 US Navy Blue Angels jet crashed during a practice flight over Smyrna, Tennessee. The pilot, Captain Jeff Kuss, 32, died. The incident occurred roughly 2 miles away from Smyrna Airport.

The crash was attributed to pilot error and cloudy weather. Nobody on the ground was hurt. The Blue Angels cancelled their performance in the Great Tennessee Air Show after the crash as well as scheduled performances in Syracuse and Dayton.

== Accident ==
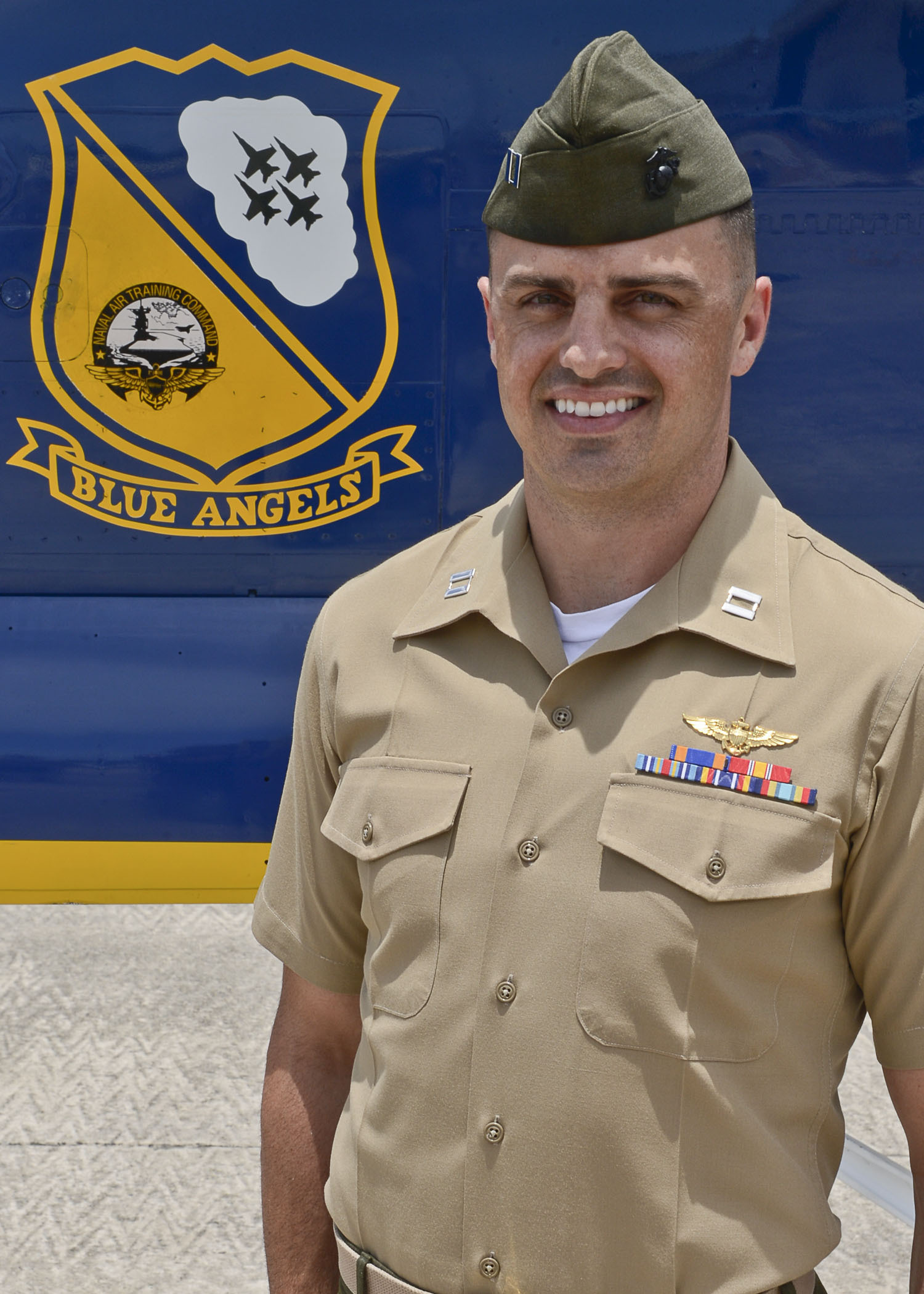
Incident pilot Jeff Kuss (a captain in the U.S. Marine Corps)

At approximately 3:01 p.m., shortly after takeoff, Captain Kuss attempted to perform a Split S maneuver during practice. While his afterburners were still on, he began diving to finish the maneuver, but was going too fast at too low of an altitude. After realizing he was going to crash, he attempted to eject from the plane, but was too late. He had stated over the radio just before the crash that he had turned his afterburners off, but it was later found out that was not true.

In the report released by the Navy, it was reported that his behavior prior to the incident was unusual, neither signing for his aircraft nor activating his transponder.

== Aftermath ==
Following the crash, the other 5 Blue Angels were ordered to land immediately. His funeral was held in Durango, Colorado, his hometown, on 11 June 2016. A Marine flyover and 21-gun salute were performed during the funeral in honor of Kuss. A memorial was installed in Smyrna in honor of Kuss in 2017, including a F/A-18C Hornet painted and numbered identically to Kuss's downed plane. Navy officials ordered changes to regulations following the crash, allowing pilots to opt-out of flying when feeling unwell and allowing for more rest time. Scheduled performances in Syracuse and Dayton that June were cancelled following the incident.

== See also ==
- 2007 Blue Angels South Carolina crash
