= Bermuda Agreement =

1946 aviation agreement between the United States and United Kingdom

The Bermuda Agreement (formally Agreement between the government of the United Kingdom and the government of the United States relating to Air Services between their respective Territories), reached in 1946 by American and British negotiators in Bermuda, was an early bilateral air transport agreement regulating civil air transport. It established a precedent for the signing of approximately 3,000 other such agreements between countries. The Agreement was replaced by the Bermuda II Agreement, which was signed in 1977 and effective in 1978.

== Background ==
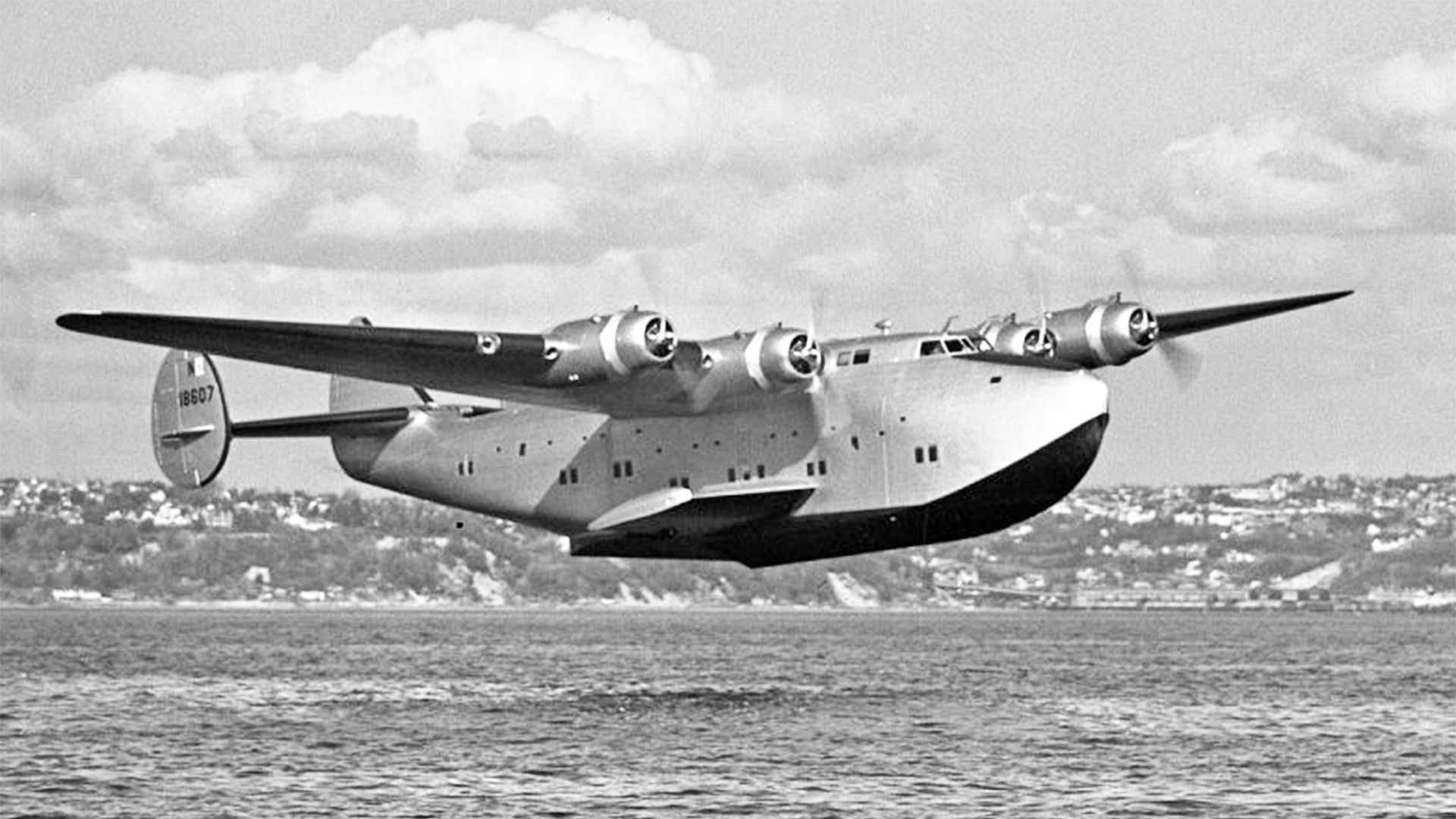
Boeing 314 flying boat

During World War II, transatlantic air service between Britain and America was limited to Boeing 314 flying boat service between Baltimore and Foynes, which Pan American World Airways had begun in July 1939. British Overseas Airways Corporation (BOAC) also flew the route using three Boeing 314s purchased from Pan Am.

The Bermuda Agreement arose in the wake of the Chicago Conference of 1944, where the United States and United Kingdom disagreed about economic control of international air transport. The US and UK had generally agreed on the first two freedoms of the air (overflight and landings for repair/refueling) but the UK and several other countries refused to accept the US position on the third, fourth and fifth freedoms regarding the handling of passenger and cargo traffic. Specifically, the US sought the freedom for its carriers to determine capacity and frequencies on international routes, while the UK sought predetermined routes and an equal division of capacity between the two nations' carriers on those routes. Britain had lost much of its air fleet in the course of World War II and was reluctant to place itself in full competition with the stronger American air fleet.

Prior to the Bermuda Agreement, the United States signed bilateral aviation agreements with several other European countries (Ireland, Norway, Sweden and Denmark), and had signed a multilateral Transport Agreement with several European and Latin American countries, but service to and from the United Kingdom had to be negotiated with the British government on an ad hoc basis. As of late 1945, the UK had limited transatlantic traffic by the US to 14 services per week, 500 seats per week and a minimum fare of $375.

In July 1945, the US government granted Pan Am, Trans World Airlines (TWA) and American Export Airlines (shortly thereafter acquired by American Airlines and renamed American Overseas Airlines) the right to operate transatlantic service. American began its Douglas DC-4 service between New York and Bournemouth that October. Pan Am announced its own DC-4 service in October 1945 at prices less than 50% of the previous flying boat fares, which led the British government to pressure both Pan Am and the US government to back away from what Britain described as a "wholly uneconomic proposition."

The US and UK governments agreed in late 1945 to meet and discuss the terms of a bilateral aviation agreement. Bermuda was chosen to host the meeting due to its location between the two countries and isolation from their respective governments. In a sign of the rapidly advancing technology of the time, the British delegation arrived in January by Boeing 314 flying boats, and departed in February by Lockheed 049 Constellation pressurized landplanes.

== Key terms ==
Unlike the existing bilateral and multilateral aviation agreements, the Bermuda Agreement defined specific routes on which each countries' carriers could fly, with the right to pick up or discharge international traffic (but no cabotage rights) at any point along the routes:

- British carriers:
  - London – New York – San Francisco – Honolulu / Midway / Wake / Guam / Manila – Singapore / Hong Kong
  - London – New York – New Orleans – Mexico
  - London – New York – Cuba – Jamaica / Panama – Colombia / Ecuador / Peru / Chile
- United States carriers:
  - US points – London – Netherlands / Germany / Scandinavia / Russia
  - US points – London – Belgium – Central Europe – Near East – India
  - Honolulu – Hong Kong – China / India
  - Honolulu – Hong Kong – Singapore – Netherlands East Indies

The inclusion of many fifth freedom routes (beyond the United States and British Isles) reflected the fact that many territories such as Hong Kong, Singapore and India were still British colonies at the time the agreement was signed, and that many third countries were eager for air service and willing to provide rights to British and American carriers without restrictions.

As a compromise on the capacity issue, the Bermuda Agreement provided for equitable principles that "there shall be a fair and equal opportunity for the carriers of the two nations to operate on any route between their respective territories (as defined in the Agreement) covered by the Agreement and its Annex" and that "in the operation by the air carriers of either Government of the trunk services described in the Annex to the Agreement, the interest of the air carriers of the other Government shall be taken into consideration so as not to affect unduly the services which the latter provides."

Fares were made subject to regulatory approval by authorities in each country or by the International Air Transport Association, effectively giving the IATA immunity from US antitrust law, which immunity remained in effect on North Atlantic routes until 1979.

== Operations under the agreement ==
=== 1940s ===
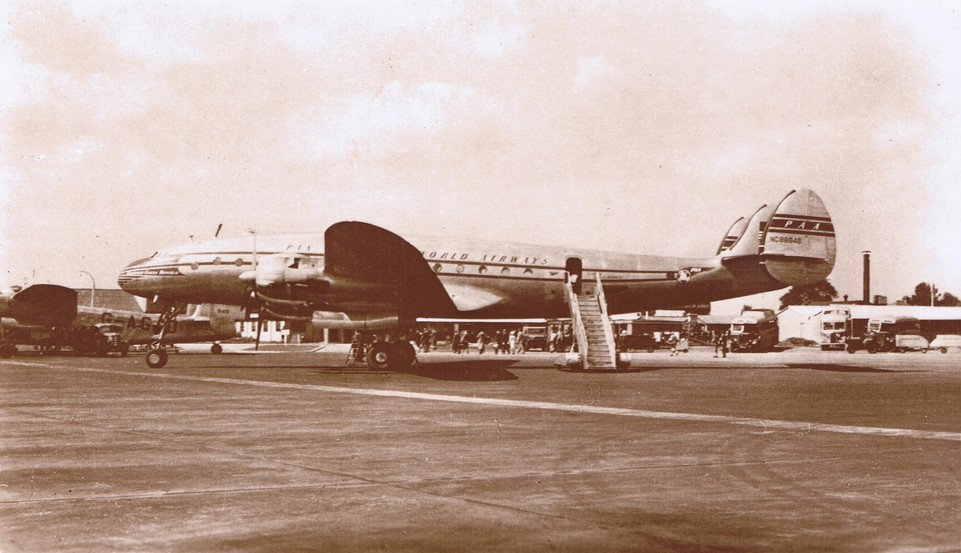
Pan Am Lockheed Constellation at Heathrow Airport, London

Pan Am took delivery of the Lockheed 749 Constellation in June 1947 and began its "round-the-world" route with eastbound stops in New York, Gander, Shannon, London, Istanbul, Dhahran, Karachi, Calcutta, Bangkok, Manila, Shanghai, Tokyo, Guam, Wake, Midway, Honolulu and San Francisco, taking advantage of Bermuda Agreement fifth freedom rights.

Newfoundland, an essential refueling stop on any transatlantic air route in the 1940s, was part of Britain at the time the Bermuda Agreement was signed. In 1949, following its accession as a Canadian province, the United States signed an agreement with Canada to provide for fifth freedom rights to and from Gander.

=== 1950s ===
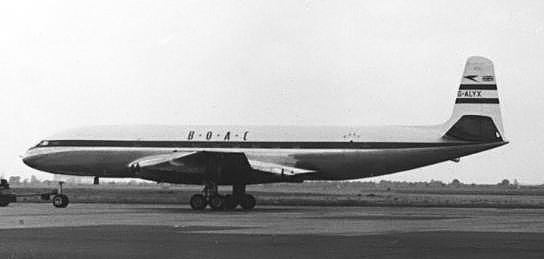
BOAC de Havilland Comet jet

Pan Am acquired AOA from American Airlines in 1950, concentrating the US-UK air travel market to three carriers: Pan Am, TWA and BOAC.

BOAC, still Britain's sole transatlantic carrier, sought to compete with Pan Am's "round the world" service by offering an "all-red" route from Britain to Australia via Canada, but bilateral agreements between the UK and these countries stalled in the early 1950s. BOAC proceeded to open a London-Chicago route in May 1954, with the intention to extend the service to San Francisco and Tokyo. The San Francisco extension was not realized until 1957, and US government approval for the Tokyo service did not come until 1959 due to objections by Northwest Airlines.

BOAC introduced de Havilland Comet jet service on the London-New York route in 1958. TWA began jet service on the New York-London-Frankfurt route in 1959.

=== 1960s ===
The United States began to exercise an even more dominant position in the transatlantic market during the 1960s. One key issue was that Pan Am and TWA began to use the hub and spoke system to feed passengers from many US destinations through a transatlantic "gateway" and on to Europe, giving the US carriers an advantage in serving secondary markets. Partly as a result of this competitive pressure, the market share of BOAC on transatlantic routes fell from 37.8% in 1961–62 to 30.9% by 1966–67.

=== 1970s ===
The British government added a privately owned carrier, British Caledonian, to the transatlantic market in 1973, with flights from London's Gatwick Airport to New York and Los Angeles. BCal was forced to exit the market in 1976 after the British government determined that competition was not improving Britain's overall market share.

== Termination ==
In 1976, the British government announced its intention to renounce the agreement, beginning the negotiation of the Bermuda II Agreement which became effective in 1978. Although the UK initially sought an equal division of capacity between UK and US carriers, the final Bermuda II agreement largely preserved the liberal capacity provisions of Bermuda I.

The Bermuda agreements were replaced in two stages on 30 March 2008, and 24 June 2010, by the EU–US Open Skies Agreement between the European Union (representing 25 European countries) and the United States, providing for an Open Skies regime even more liberal than Bermuda I.

== Effect on other aviation agreements ==
Both the United States and the United Kingdom made the Bermuda Agreement their model for bilateral agreements with other countries until Bermuda II. The only major exception during this era was the 1966 agreement between the United States and the Soviet Union, which designated Pan Am and Aeroflot as the operating carriers from each country and left commercial details of service to the airlines' prior agreement. Although most other agreements during this era followed the Bermuda I model, they tended to include fewer and fewer fifth and sixth freedom rights (traffic rights to and from third countries) as time went on, as the increased range of aircraft made such rights less necessary. The general principles of the Bermuda Agreement were also followed by other countries, such as Canada in its various bilateral agreements.
