= Flight permit =

Permits for aircraft to use airspace or airports

Flight permits are permits or permission required by an aircraft to overfly, land or make a technical stop in any country's airspace. All countries have their own regulations regarding the issuance of flight permits as there is generally a payment involved. The charges normally payable would be the Route Navigation Facility Charges or RNFC for overflights and also landing and parking charges in case of aircraft making halts. The procedure for issuance of these permits also varies from country to country. More details regarding these can be taken from the respective country's civil aviation authority websites.

== Categories ==
- An overflight permit is an authorization to enter the sovereign airspace (12 nm limit) of a given country, overfly, and exit it. The issuing of an overflight permit confirms that there is no political or security objection to your airline, aircraft, or country of origin/ destination, and that there are no outstanding navigation fees due to the ATC authority. Under the Chicago Convention on International Civil Aviation all contracting states permit overflight by other states, but for most civil aviation authorities, prior approval is required in the form of an overflight permit, each country has its own requirements in terms of documents, time to apply, and fees.
- A landing permit is an authorization to land at a given airport, and in addition to the above, confirms there are no safety or noise objections to your aircraft type, and no commercial objection if you are operating the flight for revenue.
- A special permit is required where the aircraft is not being operated on a normal certificate of airworthiness and requires approval from the Ministry of Transport, this usually happens for ferry flights or flight delivery.
- A diplomatic permit is required where the aircraft concerned is government or military. The Ministry of Foreign Affairs of the country for which you are overflying generally issues diplomatic permits.

Most countries accept applications directly from the airlines and/or their agents appointed in the respective countries. The charges for the overflying and landing are normally billed to the operators or their agents by the respective national civil aviation authority responsible for maintaining and operating all the ground to air communications facilities in its region.
