= Free Airlines =

Airline of the Democratic Republic of the congo

IATA	ICAO	Call sign
-	-	-
- Founded: 2006
- Ceased operations: 2009
- Hubs: N'Dolo Airport
- Headquarters: Kinshasa, Democratic Republic of the Congo

Free Airlines was an air operator out of N'Dolo Airport, Kinshasa, Democratic Republic of Congo.

The airline is on the list of air carriers banned in the European Union.

== Incidents ==
- June 21, 2007 Free Airlines Let-410 crash (Reg 9Q-CEU) with one fatality
- September 24, 2007 Karibu Airways Let-410 loss (Reg 9Q-CVL), departed from Lubumbashi Luano, crashed on landing at Malemba Nkulu with one fatality. Aircraft was operated by Free Airlines.

== See also ==
- Transport in the Democratic Republic of the Congo
