= Bancasi Airport =

Airport in Butuan, Agusan del Norte, Philippines

Bancasi Airport Tugpahanan sa Bancasi Tugpahanan hong Bancasi Paliparan ng Bancasi
- IATA: BXU; ICAO: RPME; WMO: 98752

Summary
- Airport type: Public
- Owner/Operator: Civil Aviation Authority of the Philippines
- Serves: Butuan
- Elevation AMSL: 43 m (141 ft)
- Coordinates: 8°57′5″N 125°28′41″E
- Website: www.butuanbancasiairport.com

Map
- Location within Mindanao mainland Location within Philippines

Runways
Direction	Length		Surface
Direction	m	ft	Surface
12/30	2,100	6,890	Asphalt

Statistics (2021)
- Passengers: 265,124
- Aircraft movements: 3,540
- Cargo (in kgs): 4,214,788
- Source: CAAP

Bancasi Airport (IATA: BXU, ICAO: RPME), also known as Butuan Airport, is an airport serving the general area of Butuan and Agusan del Norte. It is the only airport in Agusan del Norte and the largest in Caraga. The airport is classified as a Principal Domestic Airport by the Civil Aviation Authority of the Philippines (CAAP), a body of the Department of Transportation (DOTr) that is responsible for the operations of not only this airport but of all the other airports in the Philippines, except the major international airports.

The airport is located in the Bancasi Rotunda of Butuan.

== History ==
On May 25, 1964, the Senate of the Philippines planned to construct the airport with a budget of PHP 300,000.

On July 5, 2012, The Department of Transport and Communications (DOTC) announced that the airport was to receive PHP 45.5 million to subsidize the expansion of the apron, the improvement and expansion of the vehicular parking area, the construction of a drainage system, and the construction of concrete hollow block fence, with bidding scheduled to open to contractors, as a part of a PHP 303 million project to improve tourism in the country. In early March 2023, the Department of Transportation completed an expansion project, which includes a new terminal building that increased the airport's capacity from 248 to 616 passengers. As a result of the expansion project, The terminal experienced new architecture, new plumbing, new mechanics, new ceilings, new tileworks, and new paintings. On March 8, 2023, the inauguration started, attended by CAAP Director Manuel Antonio Tamayo, Department of Transportation Undersecretary for Aviation and Airports Roberto Cecilio Lim, CAAP Deputy Director General for Administration Atty. Danjun G. Lucas, and other officials.

== Airlines and destinations ==
Airlines	Destinations
Cebgo	Cebu
Cebu Pacific	Cebu, Manila
PAL Express	Cebu, Manila

The airport has 10 flights daily, with flights from Cebgo, Cebu Pacific and PAL Express.

== Structure ==
=== Runway ===
The airport has a 2.1 kilometres (1.3 mi) runway (12/30), which was extended in 2012, from 6,450ft to the current 6890ft. In 2018, the airport runway was upgraded to have turn pads on both ends in anticipation of future Airbus A321 operations. It was completed in 2019 and already went in operation when the first Airbus A321 flight arrived and departed in October that same year.

=== Tarmac ===
Butuan airport originally had three (3) parking bays for aircraft until its apron expansion in 2013. Upon completion in 2014, an additional parking bay was created.

=== Terminal ===
The airport has restaurants and shops, there are also some lounges in the airport. There are also smoking-designated areas inside the airport.

== Transport ==
There are several ways to go to the airport, these include jeepneys, car rental services, ridesharing, and car-for-hire services. The car services include LAX Shuttle and Magnum Express. The airport has its own road.

== Accidents and incidents ==
- October 26, 2007: Philippine Airlines Flight 475 arriving from Manila, operated by an Airbus A320-200 (registered as RP-C3224), overshot the runway of Butuan Airport after landing. Nineteen injuries were reported.
- February 15, 2014: Cebu Pacific Flight 220, an Airbus A319-100 (registered as RP-C3195), went off the runway of the airport on a flight to Mactan–Cebu when the nose gear and left main gear departed the paved surface of the runway during a 180-degree backtrack. 105 passengers were on board. No injuries were reported whatsoever.

== See also ==
- List of airports in the Philippines
