= Philippine Airlines Flight 475 =

2007 aviation accident in the Philippines

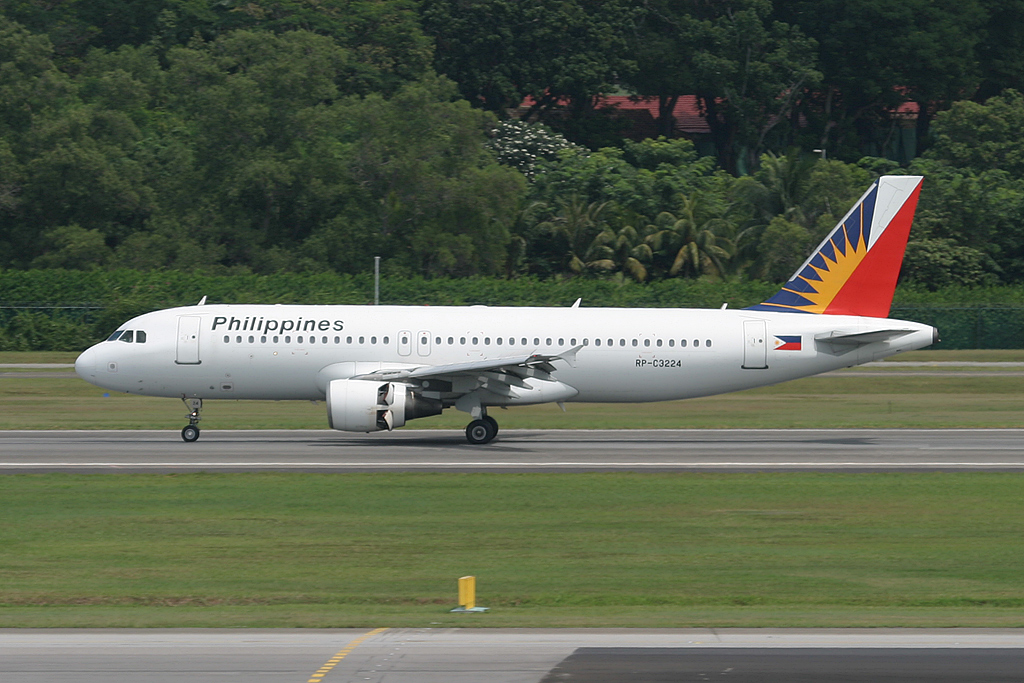
- RP-C3224, the aircraft involved in the accident, photographed in 2005

Accident
- Date: October 26, 2007
- Summary: Runway overrun, pilot error
- Site: Bancasi Airport, Butuan, Philippines

Aircraft
- Aircraft type: Airbus A320-214
- Operator: Philippine Airlines
- Registration: RP-C3224
- Flight origin: Ninoy Aquino International Airport, Metro Manila, Philippines
- Destination: Bancasi Airport, Butuan
- Occupants: 154
- Passengers: 148
- Crew: 6
- Fatalities: 0
- Injuries: 19
- Survivors: 154

Philippine Airlines Flight 475 was a scheduled passenger flight operated by an Airbus A320 from Manila's Ninoy Aquino International Airport to Butuan's Bancasi Airport that overran the runway at Butuan airport.

== Accident ==
At approximately 6:25 a.m. on October 26, 2007, Philippine Airlines Flight 475 overshot the runway while landing at Butuan (Bancasi) Airport. There were no fatalities among the aircraft's crew and passengers.

The aircraft, an Airbus A320-214 with the tail number RP-C3224, was destroyed during the incident and subsequently written off. After overrunning the runway, the A320 plowed into a bean field before hitting some coconut trees.

Nineteen people suffered injuries; the pilot and co-pilot suffered neck and nose injuries, and several people were taken to a hospital. Most injuries were sustained during the emergency evacuation.

== Aftermath ==
Bancasi Airport was closed for at least 1 day as air transport authorities evaluated the facility's ability to continue handling flights.

== Cause ==
The cause of the accident is believed to be pilot error.

According to eye-witness reports, the airliner landed past the initial touchdown zone of the runway, which left inadequate distance for it to slow down, causing the airliner to run off the runway.
