= OMA SUD Skycar =

Skycar
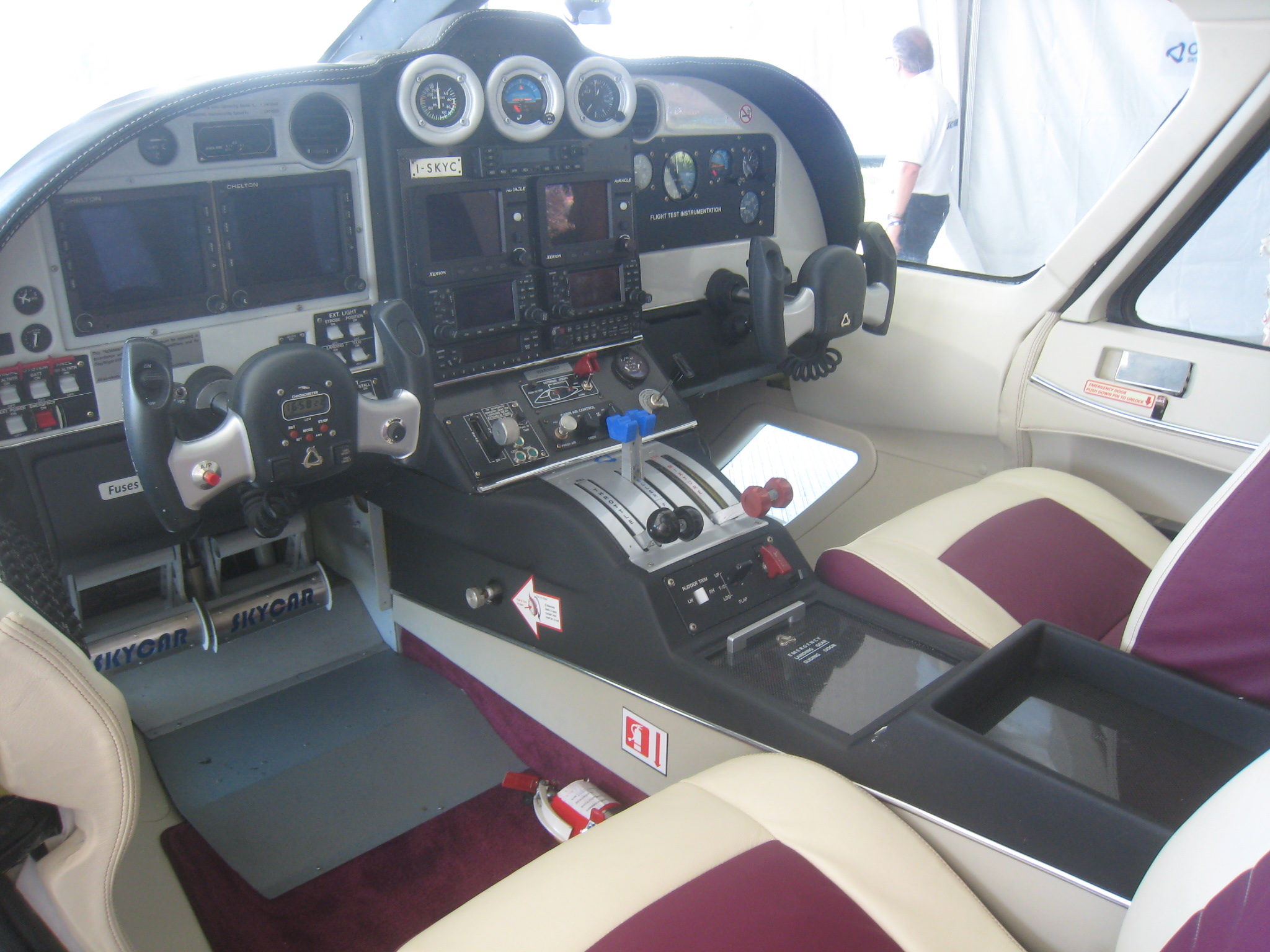
- Skycar Instrument Panel

General information
- Type: Twin-engined cabin monoplane
- National origin: Italy
- Manufacturer: OMA SUD SpA
- Number built: 1

History
- First flight: 21 December 2007

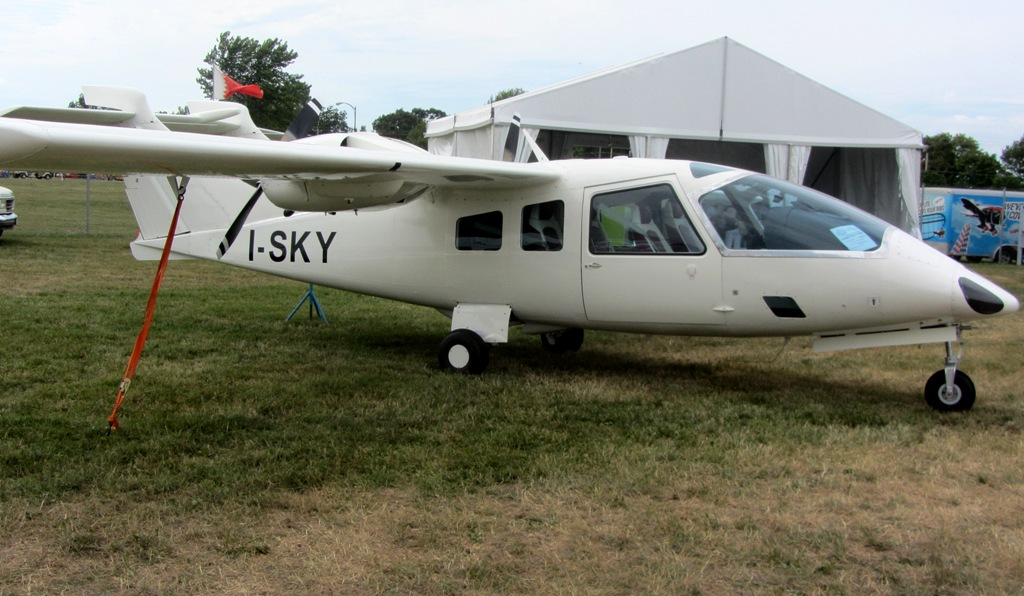
OMA SUD Skycar on display

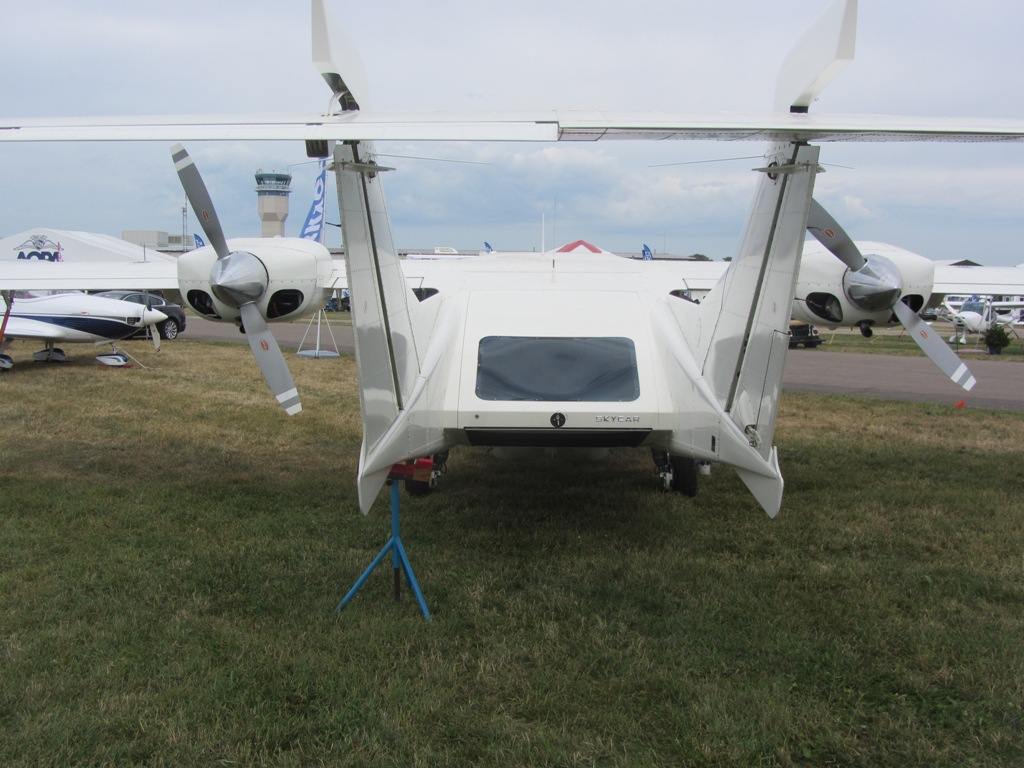
Skycar rear hatch

The OMA SUD Skycar is an Italian twin-engined five-seat piston-engined pusher configuration monoplane designed and built by OMA SUD SpA based in Capua.

== Design and development ==
The Skycar is an unusual twin-engined pusher-configuration high-wing monoplane with twin vertical tails with a high-mounted single horizontal stabiliser. The Lycoming IO-360-C1E6 piston engines are mounted on the trailing edge of each mainplane. The prototype first flew on 21 December 2007 and was first displayed in public at the 2009 Paris Air Show. The Skycar was issued with a European Aviation Safety Agency Type Certificate on 8 January 2010. The Skycar was designed for both the General Aviation market and military market.

The Skycar was issued FAA Type Certificate A63CE on 14 March 2011.

== Specifications ==
Data from EASA Type Certificate

General characteristics

- Crew: 2
- Capacity: 3 passengers
- Length: 8.92 m (29 ft 3 in)
- Wingspan: 12 m (39 ft 4 in)
- Height: 2.7 m (8 ft 9 in)
- Wing area: 16.8 m^{2} (181 sq ft)
- Empty weight: 1,460 kg (3,219 lb)
- Gross weight: 1,995 kg (4,398 lb)
- Max takeoff weight: 1,995 kg (4,398 lb)
- Fuel capacity: 500 litres (132 US gallons)
- Powerplant: 2 × Lycoming IO-360-C1E6 flat-4 piston engine , 149 kW (200 hp) each

Performance

- Maximum speed: 296 km/h (184 mph, 160 kn)
- Range: 2,013 km (1,250 mi, 1,090 nmi)
- Service ceiling: 5,486 m (18,000 ft)
- Rate of climb: 7.6 m/s (1,500 ft/min)
