= Loch Lomond Seaplanes =

British airline

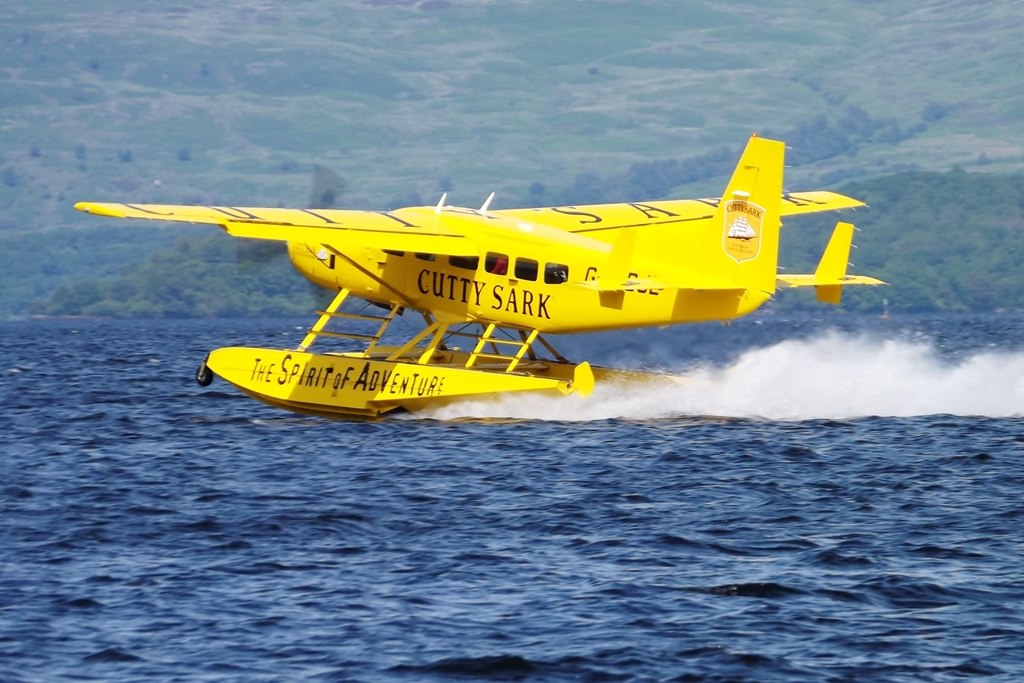
- Cessna 208 Caravan
IATA	ICAO	Call sign
-	-	-
- Founded: 2003
- Commenced operations: 2004
- Ceased operations: 2025
- Hubs: Loch Lomond
- Fleet size: 1
- Destinations: 2
- Headquarters: Helensburgh, Scotland

Loch Lomond Seaplanes was an airline based in Helensburgh, Scotland that operated 2003–2025. After receiving approval from the United Kingdom Civil Aviation Authority and Clydeport to launch services from Glasgow Seaplane Terminal, by Glasgow's Science Centre on the River Clyde in Glasgow city centre, its maiden scheduled service from Glasgow to Oban began in August 2007, making it Europe's first city centre seaplane service. It was also Scotland and the United Kingdom's first commercial seaplane service. Loch Lomond Seaplanes Ltd held a United Kingdom Civil Aviation Authority Type B Operating Licence. It was permitted to carry passengers, cargo and mail on aircraft with fewer than 20 seats and/or weighing less than 10 tonnes. It also had a base outside a hotel, Cameron House, Loch Lomond, from which comes the operator's name.

The company ceased trading on 11 April 2025.

== History ==
Loch Lomond Seaplanes was established in January 2003 and began operations the following year with a new amphibious Cessna T206H, registration G-OLLS. It was licensed as an airline under the UK Civil Aviation Authority with Air Operator's Certificate 2252. The first base was inside the newly formed Loch Lomond and Trossachs National Park. Initially flights were only for tourist/pleasure purposes, but in 2007 scheduled flights were established. Loch Lomond Seaplanes took delivery of the UK's first Amphibious Cessna 208 Caravan, registration G-MDJE, in June 2007. In August 2007, Stewart Stevenson MSP, the Minister for Transport, Infrastructure and Climate Change, opened the new £125,000 Loch Lomond Seaplanes' Glasgow Seaplane Terminal on the River Clyde beside the Glasgow Science Centre on Pacific Quay. The company was then able to launch its first scheduled service to Oban Bay on the day 20 of that month.

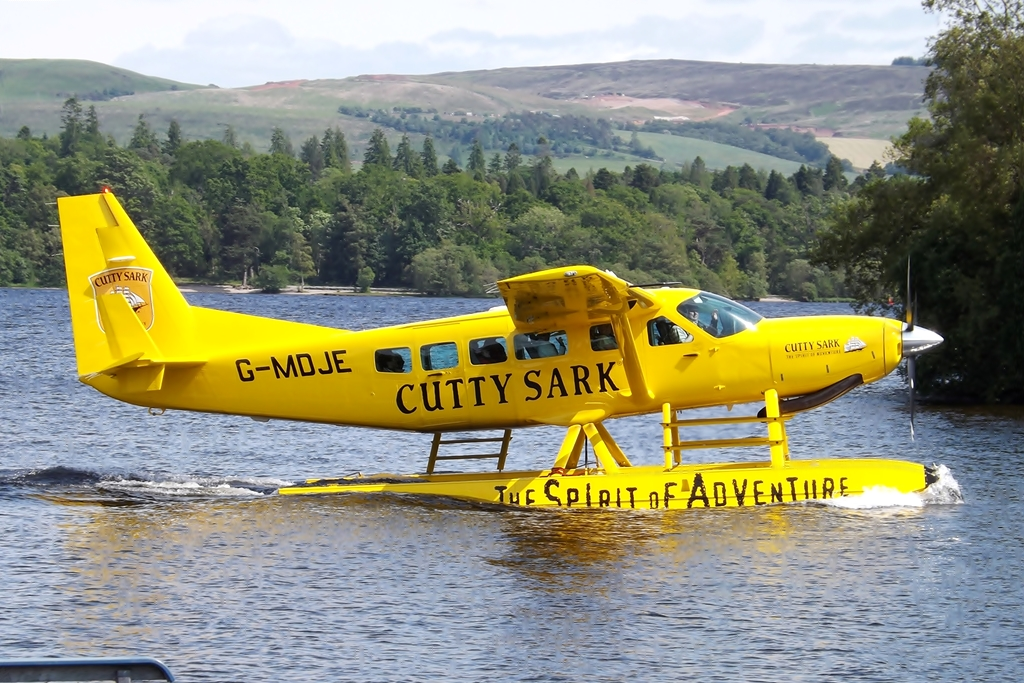
Cessna 208 Caravan

Loch Lomond Seaplanes operated a short-lived scheduled passenger service in 2024 from Cameron House pier on Loch Lomond to the Craighouse ferry terminal on the Isle of Jura. The pier at Craighouse was upgraded by Argyll and Bute Council in order to accept seaplanes. The work involved extending the pier and adding floating pontoons. The Isle of Jura service was documented by YouTuber Worldwide Dom, with the service operating up to three times a day, allowing day trips to the island, which is famous for the Isle of Jura Distillery. Prior to this, the island had seen no scheduled flight services, as the island lacks an airport. The airline operated tour and charter flights out of Loch Lomond, until they unexpectedly ceased trading on 11 April 2025.

== Media appearances ==
Their aircraft have featured on British television several times, including on the BBC's Countryfile, ITV's Emmerdale and NBC's Running Wild, starring Bear Grylls and Ben Stiller.

== Fleet ==
The fleet included the following aircraft (as of January 2018):

Aircraft type	Total	Passengers	Remarks
Cessna 208 Caravan	1	9	
Total	1		

== See also ==
- List of seaplane operators
