= 2007 Blue Angels South Carolina crash =

Aviation accident

Coordinates: 32°26′59″N 80°46′19″W

Accident
- Date: 21 April 2007
- Summary: Reduced consciousness from high acceleration
- Site: Near Marine Corps Air Station Beaufort, Beaufort, South Carolina, United States
- Total fatalities: 1
- Total injuries: 8

Aircraft
- Aircraft type: McDonnell Douglas F/A-18 Hornet
- Operator: United States Navy aerobatic team the Blue Angels
- Registration: 162897
- Crew: 1
- Fatalities: 1
- Survivors: 0

Ground casualties
- Ground fatalities: 0
- Ground injuries: 8

The 2007 Blue Angels South Carolina crash occurred on Saturday, 21 April 2007, when the Number 6 US Navy Blue Angels jet crashed during the final minutes of an air show at the Marine Corps Air Station Beaufort in Beaufort, South Carolina. The pilot, Lieutenant Commander Kevin Davis, died. Eight people were injured on the ground.

The Navy report attributed the crash to pilot error, when LCDR Davis executed a fast and tight maneuver that exposed him to much higher acceleration than usual. The high acceleration caused him to become disoriented and lose track of how close he was to the ground. In response, the Navy increased standards for Blue Angels pilots to train for high levels of acceleration.

== Accident ==
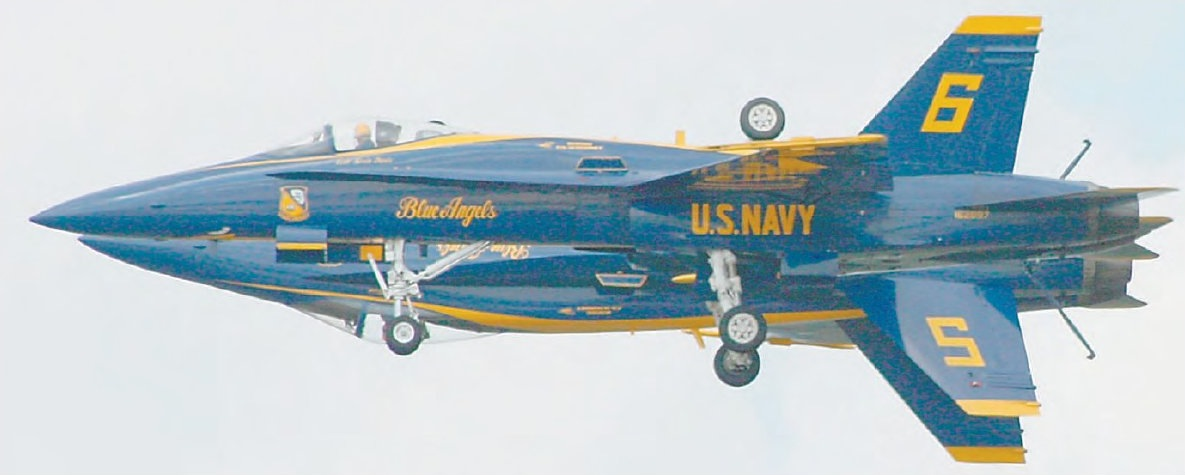
Blue Angel #5, Lt. Cmdr. John Allison, lead solo pilot and Blue Angel #6, Lt. Cmdr. Kevin J. Davis, opposing solo pilot, perform the fortus, a wingtip-to-wingtip maneuver, during Lt. Cmdr. Davis' fatal flight

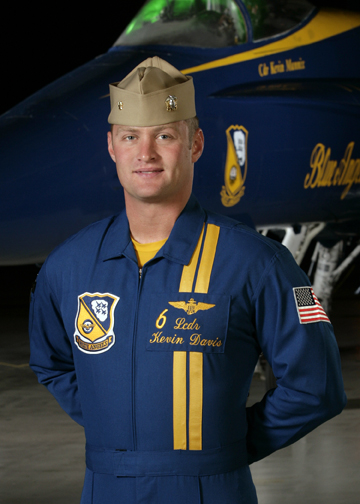
Family friends identified the downed pilot as Kevin "Kojak" Davis

At approximately 4 p.m., all six McDonnell Douglas F/A-18 Hornets of the Blue Angels were making their final turns into the landing pattern when Lt. Cmdr. Davis, piloting Blue Angel #6, left the pack. The plane crashed in a residential neighborhood about three miles from the Marine Corps Air Station. This was followed by a plume of black smoke, which Blue Angel #1 immediately began to circle while the others landed. Several rescue helicopters and local emergency vehicles went to the crash site in response to 9-1-1 calls.

== Aftermath ==
The Blue Angels returned to their home base at Naval Air Station Pensacola, Florida, to discuss continuing their season. Sunday's air show went on as planned but, in a special tribute, the GEICO Skytypers flew the missing man formation in honor of the fallen Blue Angel.

Soon after LCDR Davis’ crash, the Blue Angels began performing a five-jet demonstration. The squadron called back former Blue Angel, LCDR Craig Olson, to fill the opposing solo position. LCDR Olson had previously served with the squadron from 2003 to 2005, during which time he flew both solo positions.

A 2008 report from the Navy stated the main cause of the crash was pilot error. In an effort to catch up to the other pilots, LCDR Davis made a sharper-than-usual turn that subjected him to forces over six times the force of gravity. The resulting loss of blood flow to the brain likely caused LCDR Davis to experience tunnel vision, become disoriented, and lose track of how close he was to the ground. Blue Angels pilots are not required to wear G-suits to compensate for high acceleration because the suit impairs movement in the cockpit; at any rate, the acceleration on LCDR Davis was too high for a G-suit to compensate for.

The Navy increased the high-g training of Blue Angels pilots to prevent future crashes. The requirements are more frequent training in centrifuges and adopt higher physical fitness standards to counteract the risk of losing consciousness.

== See also ==
- 2016 Blue Angels Tennessee crash
- List of air show accidents and incidents
