= DuPont Aerospace DP-1 =

DP-1
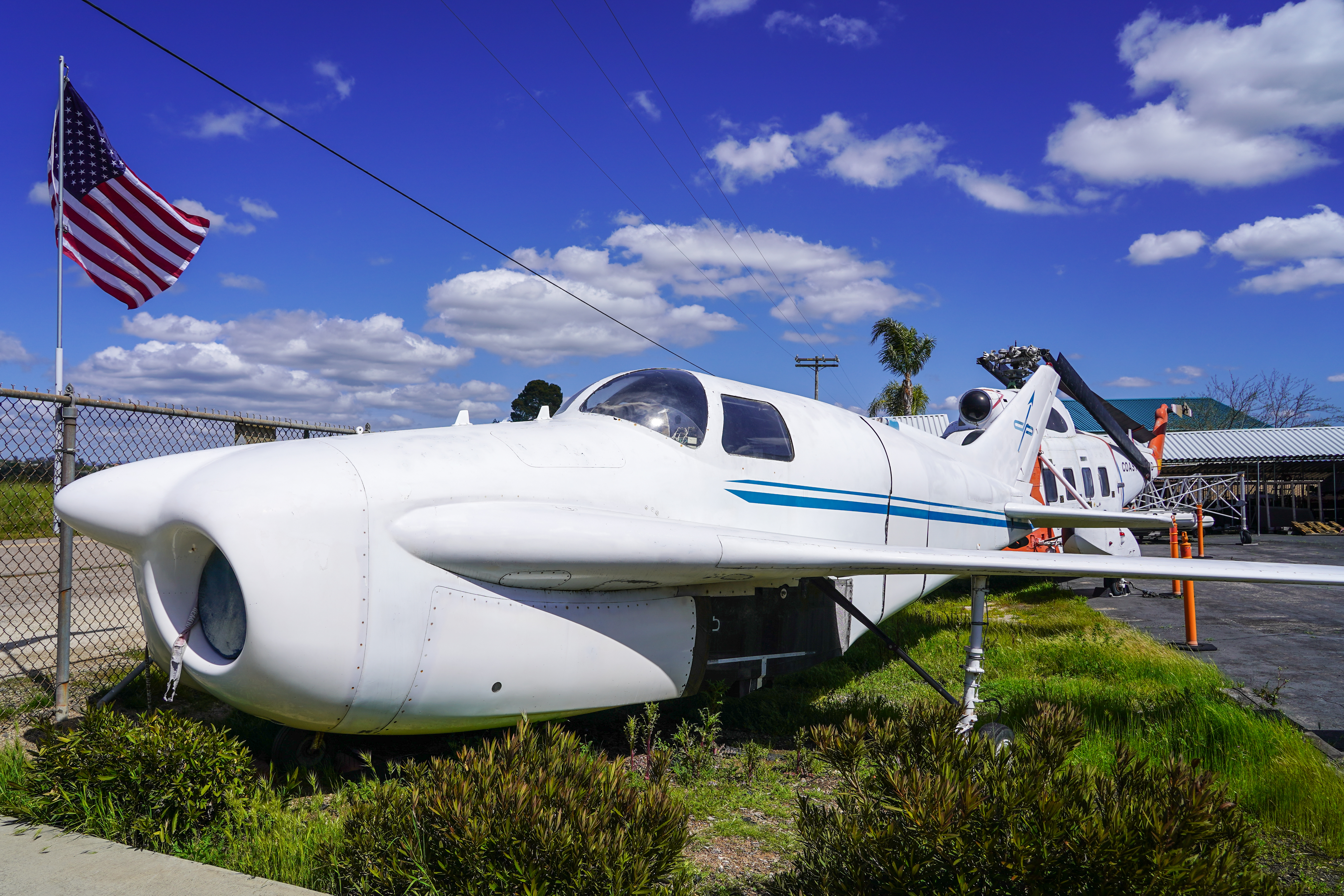

General information
- Type: VSTOL transport demonstrator
- National origin: United States of America
- Manufacturer: DuPont Aerospace

History
- Manufactured: 1
- First flight: September 2007

The DuPont Aerospace DP-1 was a subscale prototype for a fixed-wing VSTOL transport aircraft, intended to take off and land like a helicopter and fly like an airplane. The fullscale aircraft, named DP-2, was designed to travel at high subsonic speeds with a greater range than its rotary-wing equivalent, and to allow troops to rappel from the aft cargo ramp. The development of the 53% scale DP-1 aircraft was originally funded in the early 1990s as a backup to the V-22 Osprey program, which was undergoing significant technical and political challenges. During the construction of the test aircraft, program management changed the requirements, and mandated that the vehicle be tested as a UAV. This change added significant cost and time to the project, but in September 2007, the DP-1 autonomous prototype achieved sustained, controlled tethered hovers of 45 seconds at the Gillespie Field test site.

On June 13, 2007, the U.S. House Committee on Science and Technology held a hearing about the fate of the DP-2. In August 2007, funding was finally cut, after a total of $63 million spent over nearly two decades.
