= Glasgow Seaplane Terminal =

Airport for seaplanes in Glasgow, Scotland

Coordinates: 55.8586°N 4.29543°W

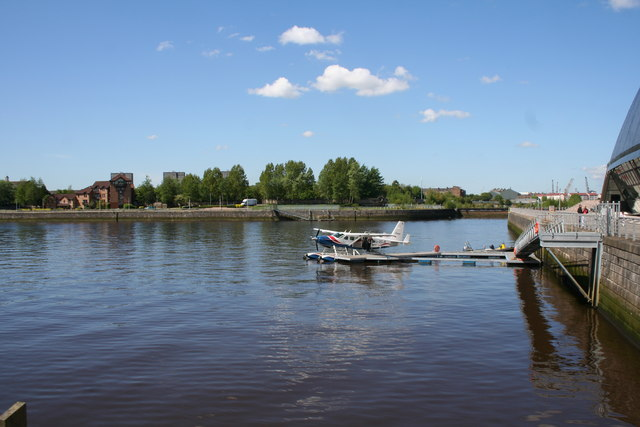
Seaplane at the jetty

Glasgow Seaplane Terminal is a seaplane airport terminal in Glasgow, Scotland. It opened in August 2007.

The terminal is located in the 'Princes Dock' adjacent Glasgow Science Centre in the Pacific Quay area of the city. The city also has two international airports, Glasgow Airport and Glasgow Prestwick Airport, although both are located outside the city.

The terminal maiden scheduled service from Glasgow to Oban began in August 2007. It is currently Europe's only city centre commercial seaplane service in operation.

== History ==
The terminal was opened by Loch Lomond Seaplanes, in August 2007, to allow the first commercial seaplane service in nearly 50 years to start from the city centre, initially from Glasgow to Oban, flying from the River Clyde Pacific Quay area. A service to Tobermory on the Isle of Mull operated in 2008.

Loch Lomond Seaplanes offered charter services from the terminal until they ceased operations in April 2025

== Services ==
- Loch Lomond Seaplanes (Oban, Tobermory).
