= Karibu Airways =

Airline of the Democratic Republic of the Congo

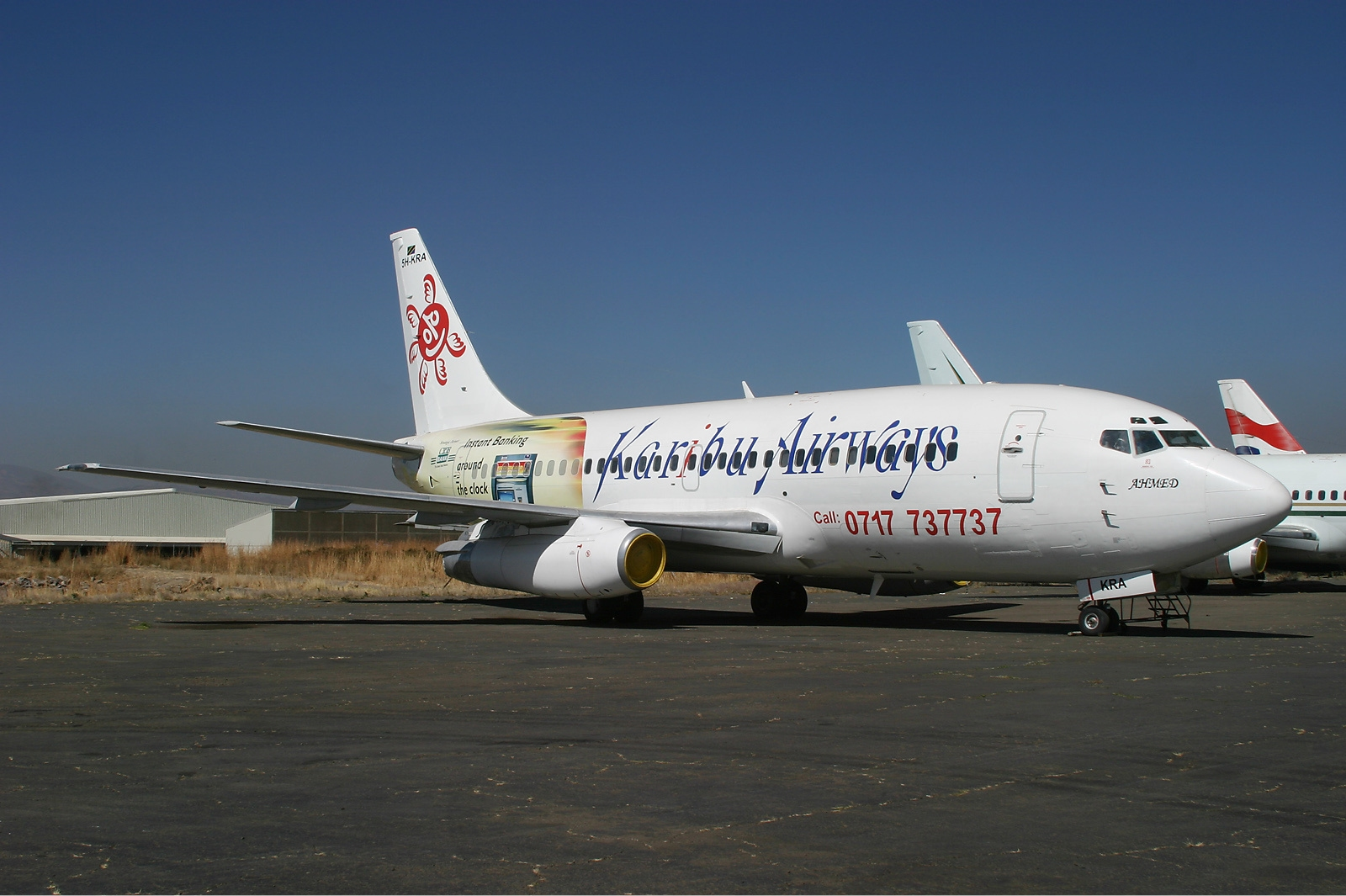
IATA	ICAO	Call sign
-	-	-
- Founded: 2000s
- Ceased operations: 2009 (never officially disestablished)
- Headquarters: Kinshasa, Democratic Republic of the Congo

Karibu Airways is an inactive airline based in the Democratic Republic of the Congo.

Due to two plane crashes in 2007, confidence in the airline was lost, and it was placed on the list of air carriers banned in the EU. Subsequently, all operations came to a halt. The airline was never officially disestablished, but as of March 2009 no staff is employed anymore.

== Accidents and incidents ==
- 21 June 2007: One passenger was killed and thirteen injured, when a Let L-410UVP turboprop-powered aircraft (reg 9Q-CEU) crashed into a swamp on takeoff from Kamina Airport. The aircraft came to rest lying on its roof. Investigations revealed that the aircraft was overloaded, carrying 22 passengers and 3 crew. A Let-410 aircraft is laid out for 19 passengers and 2 crew. The only casualty of the crash was a member of the National Assembly of the Democratic Republic of the Congo.
- 24 September 2007: The pilot was killed and five passengers were injured, when a Let-410UVP turboprop-powered aircraft in Karibu livery being operated by Free Airlines crash-landed.

== See also ==
List of defunct airlines of Democratic Republic of the Congo

== See also ==
- Transport in the Democratic Republic of the Congo
