= Air transport agreement =

Aviation agreement between states

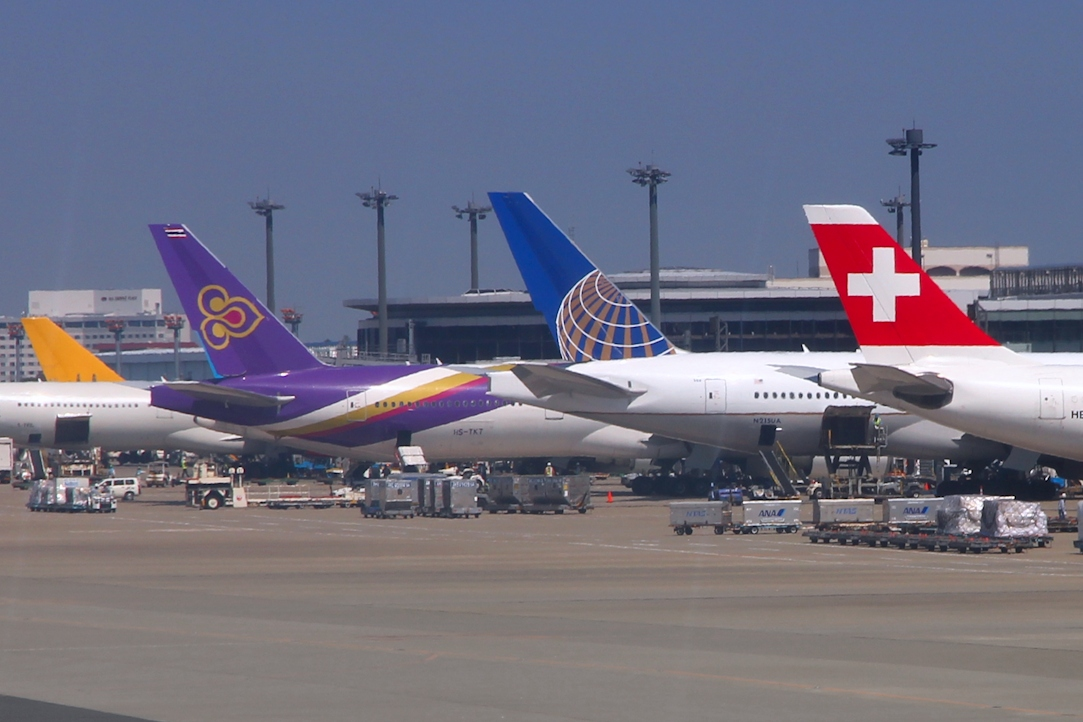
Variety of airlines at Tokyo Narita Airport: result of agreement between Japan and other countries

An air transport agreement (also sometimes called an air service agreement or ATA or ASA) is a bilateral agreement to allow international commercial air transport services between signatories.

The bilateral system has its basis under the Chicago Convention and associated multilateral treaties. The Chicago Convention was signed in December 1944 and has governed international air services since then. the convention also has a range of annexes covering issues such as aviation security, safety oversight, airworthiness, navigation, environmental protection and facilitation (expediting and departure at airports).

In 1913, in what was probably the earliest such agreement, a bilateral exchange of notes was signed between Germany and France to provide for airship services.

One of the first ATAs following World War II was the Bermuda Agreement, which was signed in 1946 by the United Kingdom and the United States. Features of this agreement became models for the thousands of such agreements that were to follow, although in recent decades some of the traditional clauses in such agreements have been modified (or "liberalized") in accordance with "open skies" policies adopted by some governments, notably the United States.

In principle all ATAs should be registered by the International Civil Aviation Organization in DAGMAR, the ICAO's Database of Aeronautical Agreements and Arrangements, but this source is not absolutely comprehensive.

Air service agreements (ASA) are formal treaties between countries – accompanying memoranda of understanding (MoU) and exchanges of formal diplomatic notes. It is not mandatory to have an ASA in place for international services to operate, but the cases where services exist without treaty are rare.

ASAs cover the basic framework under which airlines are granted economic bilateral rights to fly two countries. The frequency, the designated airlines of the two signing countries, origin and intermediate points, traffic rights, type of aircraft and tax issues are normally covered by MoUs.

== See also ==
- EU–US Open Skies Agreement
- Bermuda Agreement
- International flight
