= EU–US Open Skies Agreement =

Air transport agreement

The EU–US Open Skies Agreement is an open skies air transport agreement between the European Union (EU) and the United States (US). The agreement allows any airline of the European Union and any airline of the United States to fly between any point in the European Union and any point in the United States. Both EU and US airlines are allowed to fly on to a further destination in another country after their initial stop (Fifth Freedom rights). Because the EU is not treated as a single territory for the purposes of the agreement, this means in practice that US airlines can fly between two points in the EU as long as that flight is the continuation of a flight that started in the US (e.g. New York - Paris - Berlin). Airlines of the EU are also allowed to fly between the US and non-EU countries that are part of the European Common Aviation Area, like Switzerland. EU and US airlines can operate all-cargo flights under Seventh Freedom rights, meaning US airlines' all-cargo flights can be operated from one EU country to any other country (including another EU country) and EU airlines' all-cargo flights can operate between the US and any other country. Norway and Iceland acceded to the Agreement in 2011 and their airlines enjoy the same rights as EU airlines.

The treaty disappointed European airlines as they felt it was tilted in favour of United States airlines: while US airlines are allowed to operate intra-EU flights (if this is an all-cargo flight or a passenger flight if it is the second leg of a flight started in the US), European airlines are not permitted to operate intra-US flights nor are they allowed to purchase a controlling stake in a US operator. The Agreement replaced and superseded previous open skies agreements between the US and individual European countries.

The initial agreement was signed in Washington, D.C., on 30 April 2007. The agreement became effective 30 March 2008. Phase two was signed in June 2010 and it has been applied provisionally, pending ratification by all signatories.

== Impact ==
=== London–United States ===
Under the agreement, London Heathrow was opened to full competition. This ended the exclusive right granted for only two US airlines and two UK airlines (established under Bermuda II Agreement in 1977, which remains in force for UK overseas territories' traffic rights to the US) to fly transatlantic services out of Heathrow. These four airlines were British Airways, Virgin Atlantic, United Airlines, and American Airlines.

This right also exists for third-country carriers with incumbent fifth freedom rights to carry passengers between Heathrow and the United States. These rights were previously exercised by Air New Zealand (between Los Angeles and Heathrow), Air India (between New York-JFK and London Heathrow), and Kuwait Airways (also between New York-JFK and London Heathrow). El Al also had such rights but chose not to use them, and Iran Air technically also had similar rights, but is prohibited from flying to the US due to US government economic sanctions against Iran.

Delta Air Lines began services to Heathrow from Atlanta, New York–JFK, Boston, Detroit and Seattle/Tacoma in 2008. Other airlines, such as Northwest Airlines, Continental Airlines and US Airways also began services to Heathrow, but have since ceased independent operations under these brand names, following their respective mergers with Delta, United, and American.

Nevertheless, expansion of transatlantic flights to or from Heathrow continue to be limited by lack of runway capacity (currently its two runways operate at over 98 percent capacity), government limits (especially when expansion plans to build a third runway and a sixth terminal were cancelled on 12 May 2010, by the new coalition government), and the fact that many take-off slots are owned by incumbent airlines (IAG's airlines, including British Airways, Aer Lingus and Iberia, account for 54% of slots).

=== Fares ===
There is little consensus about whether increased transatlantic competition will have any effect on fares. Some believe the market is already highly competitive. Other sources have been predicting radical changes, such as €10 flights.

There have been a number of new entrants that have come into the market in recent years, who have adapted the model of the short-haul low-cost airlines to the transatlantic route. Initially in 2007, Ryanair announced that it was planning to start a new airline (RyanAtlantic) that would operate long-haul flights between Europe and the United States but that project was cancelled. However, in 2014 Norwegian Air Shuttle announced it would start low-cost flights to the US from the Republic of Ireland and later the UK, in part made possible by new wide-body and narrow-body aircraft with increased fuel efficiency and range. Its Irish and then its new UK subsidiaries applied for US permission to operate these routes, which was met with resistance in the US. Eventually, after the European Commission said it would initiate arbitration procedures under the Agreement, the US granted the Norwegian subsidiaries rights to fly to the US. Other long-haul low-cost airlines, such as LEVEL, Primera Air and Wow Air, later entered the market, however the latter two have since ceased operation.

=== Consequences of the UK leaving the EU ===
There was some debate as to what consequences the UK leaving the EU (Brexit) in 2020 would have on UK and United States airlines flying between the UK and United States. In November 2018, the UK concluded an individual open sky agreement with the US that will supersede the EU agreement post-Brexit.
