= Kamina Airport =

Kamina Airport Aéroport de Kamina-Ville Kamina Ville Airport
- IATA: KMN; ICAO: FZSB

Summary
- Airport type: Public
- Serves: Kamina, Democratic Republic of the Congo
- Elevation AMSL: 3,474 ft (1,059 m)
- Coordinates: 08°43′43″S 24°59′29″E

Map
- Location of Airport in Democratic Republic of the Congo

Runways
Direction	Length		Surface
Direction	m	ft	Surface
10/28	1,470	4,823	Dirt
- Source: GCM Google Maps

Kamina Airport (IATA: KMN, ICAO: FZSB) (French: Aéroport de Kamina) is an airport serving Kamina, a city in Haut-Lomami Province, Democratic Republic of the Congo.

Kamina Airport is separate from the larger military Kamina Air Base VOR (Ident: KMB) which is located 16.4 nautical miles (30.4 km) east-northeast of the airport.

== Airlines and destinations ==
Airlines	Destinations
Compagnie Africaine d'Aviation	Lubumbashi

== Accidents and incidents ==
- On June 21, 2007, a Let-410 twin turboprop operated by Karibu Airways crashed into a swamp shortly after taking off from Kamina Airport. One passenger, Mbuyu Mibanga, a member of the National Assembly of the Democratic Republic of the Congo was killed. At least 12 more were injured, including two Congolese doctors working for the World Health Organization.

== See also ==
- Transport in the Democratic Republic of the Congo
- List of airports in the Democratic Republic of the Congo
