= Freedoms of the air =

Set of international commercial aviation rights

The freedoms of the air, also called five freedoms of air transport, are a set of commercial aviation rights granting a country's airlines the privilege to enter and land in another country's airspace. They were formulated as a result of disagreements over the extent of aviation liberalisation in the Convention on International Civil Aviation of 1944, known as the Chicago Convention. The United States had called for a standardized set of separate air rights to be negotiated between states, but most other countries were concerned that the size of the U.S. airlines would dominate air travel if there were not strict rules. The freedoms of the air are the fundamental building blocks of the international commercial aviation route network. The use of the terms "freedom" and "right" confers entitlement to operate international air services only within the scope of the multilateral and bilateral treaties (air services agreements) that allow them.

The first two freedoms concern the passage of commercial aircraft through foreign airspace and airports, while the other freedoms are about carrying people, mail and cargo internationally. The first through fifth freedoms are officially enumerated by international treaties, especially the Chicago Convention. Several other freedoms have been added, and although most are not officially recognised under broadly applicable international treaties, they have been agreed to by a number of countries. The lower-numbered freedoms are relatively universal while the higher-numbered ones are rarer and more controversial. Liberal open skies agreements often represent the least restrictive form of air services agreements and may include many if not all freedoms. They are relatively rare, but examples include the recent single aviation markets established in the European Union (European Common Aviation Area), and between Australia and New Zealand.

== Overview ==
Freedoms of the air apply to commercial aviation. The terms 'freedom' and 'right' are a shorthand way of referring to the type of international services permitted between two or more countries. Even when such services are allowed by countries, airlines may still face restrictions to accessing them by the terms of treaties or for other reasons.

a diagram of the nine freedoms, with blue circles indicating the operating airline's domestic market and red or yellow circles indicating foreign markets

Freedom	Description	Example
1st	The right to fly over a foreign country without landing.	A flight from Canada to Mexico, flown by a Mexican airline, flying over the United States.
2nd	The right to refuel or carry out maintenance in a foreign country without embarking or disembarking passengers or cargo.	A flight from the United Kingdom to the United States, flown by a British airline, refueling at an Irish airport such as Shannon.
3rd	The right to fly from one's own country to another country.	A flight from New Zealand to Japan, flown by a New Zealand airline.
4th	The right to fly from another country to one's own.	A flight from Chile to Brazil, flown by a Brazilian airline.
5th	The right to fly between two foreign countries on a journey originating or ending in one's own country. Each leg can be flown by a different aircraft so long as the same flight number is used.	A flight from Melbourne, Australia to Kuala Lumpur, Malaysia, with a stop in Denpasar, Indonesia, flown by a Malaysian airline. Passengers and cargo may travel between Melbourne and Denpasar, with no intention to continue on to Kuala Lumpur.
6th	The right to fly from a foreign country to another while stopping in one's own country for non-technical reasons.	A flight from New Zealand to Colombia, flown by an airline based in Chile, with a stop in Santiago, Chile. This can also be a flight by a Colombian airline flying under the 5th freedom, allowing codeshare by the Chilean airline which uses the 6th freedom.
modified 6th	The right to fly between two places in a foreign country while stopping in one's own country for non-technical reasons.	A flight from Seattle, United States to Boston, United States, stopping over Toronto, Canada, flown by a Canadian airline, with a passenger ticketed from Seattle to Boston.
7th	The right to fly between two foreign countries, where the flights do not touch one's own country.	A flight between Spain and Sweden, flown by an Irish airline.
8th	The right to fly inside a foreign country, having started from or continuing to one's own country.	A flight operated by a South African airline between San Francisco and Cape Town, with a full stop in New York. Passengers and cargo may board or disembark the flight in New York, with no intention to board the flight to Cape Town.
9th	The right to fly within a foreign country without continuing to one's own country.	A flight flown between Paris and Lyon by a German airline.

== Transit rights ==
The first and second freedoms grant rights to pass through a country without carrying traffic that originates or terminates there and are known as 'transit rights'. The Chicago Convention drew up a multilateral agreement in which the first two freedoms, known as the International Air Services Transit Agreement (IASTA) or "Two Freedoms Agreement", were open to all signatories. At the end of 2017, the treaty was accepted by 133 countries.

A country granting transit rights may impose fees for the privilege. The reasonableness of such fees has caused controversy at times.

=== First freedom ===
IASTA participants (and some of their dependent territories)

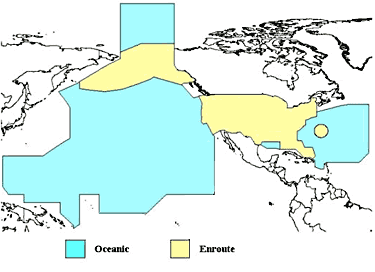
The United States has authority to charge overflight fees over its territory (en route, yellow) and over ocean regions where it has been delegated air traffic control responsibilities by the ICAO (oceanic, blue). The fees are applicable only to overflights; domestic and international flights arriving/departing the US are taxed through landing fees. (Note: Some US island territories lie within the oceanic fee regions, while the en route fee is charged over the Bahamas and Bermuda, where it provides only high-altitude ATC service)

The first freedom is the right to fly over a foreign country without landing. It grants the privilege to fly over the territory of a treaty country without landing. Member states of the International Air Services Transit Agreement grant this freedom (as well as the second freedom) to other member states, subject to the transiting aircraft using designated air routes. As of the summer of 2007, 129 countries were parties to this treaty, including such large ones as the United States, India, and Australia. However, Brazil, Russia, Indonesia, and China never joined, with Canada leaving the treaty in 1988. These large and strategically located non-IASTA-member states prefer to maintain tighter control over foreign airlines' overflight of their airspace and negotiate transit agreements with other countries on a case-by-case basis. During the Cold War, the Soviet Union and China did not allow airlines to enter their airspace. There were flights from Europe to Japan that refueled in Alaska. Since the end of the Cold War, first freedom rights are almost completely universal. Most countries require prior notification before an overflight and charge fees, which can sometimes be substantial.

IASTA allows each member country to charge foreign airlines "reasonable" fees for using its airports (which is applicable, presumably, only to the second freedom) and "facilities"; according to IATA, such fees should not be higher than those charged to domestic airlines engaged in similar international services. Such fees indeed are commonly charged merely for the privilege of the overflight of a country's national territory, when no airport usage is involved. (Overflights might still be using services of a country's air traffic control centers). For example, the Federal Aviation Administration of the U.S., an IASTA signatory, charges overflight fees based on the great circle distance between an aircraft's points of entry into and exit from U.S.-controlled airspace. This transit is then divided into overland (referred to as en route) and oceanic components; the latter include flights over international waters where air traffic is controlled by the U.S., including sections of Atlantic and Arctic Oceans and much of the northern Pacific Ocean. Since 2019 these have been charged at $0.6175/nmi ($0.3334/km; $0.5366/mi) for en route components, and $0.2651/nmi ($0.1431/km; $0.2304/mi) for the oceanic components.

Countries that are not signatories of the IASTA charge overflight fees as well; among them, Russia is known for charging high fees, especially on the transarctic routes (between North America and Asia) that cross Siberia. In 2008, Russia temporarily denied Lufthansa Cargo permission to overfly its airspace with cargo ostensibly due to "delayed payments for its flyover rights". In 2008, European airlines were paying Russia €300 million a year for flyover permissions.

Due to the Russo-Ukrainian War, in 2022 the US, EU and other countries cancelled the third and fourth freedoms for Russian airlines, preventing them flying to these countries. In response Russia blocked all freedoms for western airlines, including the first freedom. Flights from the EU to Japan now fly over central Asia and China instead. Chinese and other airlines continue to fly over Russia.

=== Second freedom ===
The second freedom allows technical stops without the embarking or disembarking of passengers or cargo. It is the right to stop in one country solely for refueling or other maintenance on the way to another country. Because of longer range of modern airliners, second freedom rights are comparatively rarely exercised by passenger carriers today, and then often as fifth freedom, allowing new passengers to embark at the stop. But second freedom rights are widely used by air cargo carriers, and are more or less universal between countries.

The most famous example of the second freedom is Shannon Airport (Ireland), which was used as a stopping point for most transatlantic flights until the 1960s, since Shannon Airport was the closest European airport to the United States. Anchorage was similarly used for flights between Western Europe and East Asia, bypassing Soviet airspace, closed until the end of the Cold War. Anchorage was still used by some Chinese airlines for flights to the U.S. and Toronto until the 2000s. Flights between Europe and South Africa often stopped at Ilha do Sal (Sal Island) in Cabo Verde, off the coast of Senegal, due to many African nations refusing to allow South African flights to overfly their territory during the Apartheid regime. Gander, Newfoundland was also a frequent stopping point for airlines from the USSR and the Eastern Bloc on the way to the Caribbean, Central America, Mexico, and South America.

== Traffic rights ==
In contrast to transit rights, 'traffic rights' allow commercial international services between, through and in some cases within the countries that are parties to air services agreements or other treaties. While it was agreed that the third to fifth freedoms would be negotiated between states, the International Air Transport Agreement (or "Five Freedoms Agreement") was also opened for signatures, encompassing the first five freedoms. The remaining four freedoms are made possible by some air services agreements but are not 'officially' recognized because they are not mentioned by the Chicago Convention.

=== Third and fourth freedoms ===
The third and fourth freedoms allow basic international service between two countries. Even when reciprocal third and fourth freedom rights are granted, air services agreements (e.g., the Bermuda Agreements) may still restrict many aspects of the traffic, such as the capacity of aircraft, the frequency of flights, the airlines permitted to fly and the airports permitted to be served. The third freedom is the right to carry passengers or cargo from one's own country to another. The right to carry passengers or cargo from another country to one's own is the fourth freedom. Third and fourth freedom rights are almost always granted simultaneously in bilateral agreements between countries.

=== Beyond rights ===
Beyond rights allow the carriage of traffic between (and sometimes within) countries that are foreign to the airlines that operate them. Today, the most controversial of these are fifth freedom rights. Less controversial but still restricted at times, though relatively more common, are sixth freedom rights.

Beyond rights also encompass international flights with a foreign intermediate stop where passengers may only embark and disembark at the intermediate point on the leg of the flight that serves the origin of an airline operating it. It also includes 'stopover' traffic where passengers may embark or disembark at an intermediate stop as part of an itinerary between the endpoints of a multi-leg flight or connecting flights. (Note: Even when fifth freedom rights are in place further restrictions on capacity and frequency may result in an airline only using the rights for stopover traffic or not being able to carry any traffic at all.) Some international flights stop at multiple points in a foreign country and passengers may sometimes make stopovers in a similar manner, but because the traffic being carried does not originate in the country where the flight takes place it is not cabotage but another form of beyond rights.

==== Fifth freedom ====
The fifth freedom allows an airline to carry revenue traffic between foreign countries as a part of services connecting the airline's own country. It is the right to carry passengers from one's own country to a second country, and from that country onward to a third country (and so on). An example of a fifth freedom traffic right is Singapore Airlines flight SQ 26 from Singapore to New York (John F. Kennedy) via Frankfurt, where tickets may be sold on all legs.

Fifth freedom traffic rights are intended to enhance the economic viability of an airline's long haul routes, but tend to be viewed by local airlines and governments as potentially unfair competition. The negotiations for fifth freedom traffic rights can be lengthy, because in practice the approval of at least three different nations is required. (Note: Because of this three types of fifth freedom traffic can be distinguished: 'intermediate point', where the right is granted from a third country to a second one between the third and the grantee; 'beyond-point', where the country giving the right allows traffic to continue to third countries; and 'behind-point' or 'anterior-point' where the grantor allows service between other destinations outside of the grantee's country of origin.)

Fifth freedom traffic rights were instrumental to the economic viability of long-haul flight until the early 1980s, when advances in technology and increased passenger volume enabled the operation of more non-stop flights. The excess capacity on multi-sector routes could be filled by picking up and dropping off passengers along the way. It was not uncommon for carriers to schedule stops in one or more foreign countries on the way to a flight's final destination. Fifth freedom flights were common between Europe and Africa, South America and the Far East. An example of a multi-sector flight in the mid-1980s was an Alitalia service from Rome to Tokyo via Athens, Delhi, Bangkok and Hong Kong. Fifth freedom flights remained highly common in East Asia during the 2000s, particularly on routes serving Tokyo, Hong Kong and Bangkok. Between the latter two destinations, in 2004, service was provided by at least four airlines whose home base was not in either Hong Kong or Bangkok. The Singapore-Bangkok route has also constituted an important fifth freedom market. In the late 1990s, half of the seats available between the two cities were offered by airlines holding fifth freedom traffic rights. Other major markets served by fifth freedom flights can be found in Europe, South America, the Caribbean and the Tasman Sea.

Fifth freedom traffic rights are sought by airlines wishing to take up unserved or underserved routes, or by airlines whose flights already make technical stops at a location as allowed by the second freedom. Governments (e.g., Thailand) may sometimes encourage fifth freedom traffic as a way of promoting tourism, by increasing the number of seats available. In turn, though, there may be reactionary pressure to avoid liberalizing traffic rights too much in order to protect a flag carrier's commercial interests. By the 1990s, fifth freedom traffic rights stirred controversy in Asia because of loss-making services by airlines in the countries hosting them. Particularly in protest over US air carriers' service patterns in Asia, some nations have become less generous in granting fifth freedom traffic rights, while sixth freedom traffic has grown in importance for Asian airlines.

The Japan-United States bilateral air transport agreement of 1952 has been viewed as being particularly contentious because unlimited fifth freedom traffic rights have been granted to designated US air carriers serving destinations in the Asia Pacific region west of Japan. For example, in the early 1990s, the Japanese government's refusal to permit flights on the New York City—Osaka—Sydney route led to protests by the US government and the airlines that applied to serve that route. The Japanese government countered that only about 10% of the traffic on the Japan—Australia sector was third and fourth freedom traffic to and from the US, while the bilateral agreement specified that primary justification for unlimited fifth freedom traffic was to fill up aircraft carrying a majority of US-originated or US-destined traffic under those rights. Japan had held many unused fifth freedom traffic rights beyond the USA. However, these were seen as being less valuable than the fifth freedom traffic rights enjoyed by US air carriers via Japan, because of the higher operating costs of Japanese airlines and also geographical circumstances. Japan serves as a useful gateway to Asia for North American travelers. The US contended that Japan's favourable geographical location and its flag airlines' carriage of a sizeable volume of sixth freedom traffic via gateway cities in Japan helped to level the playing field. In 1995, the air transport agreement was updated by way of liberalizing Japanese carriers' access to US destinations, while placing selected restrictions on US air carriers.

Up until the 1980s, Air India's flights to New York JFK from India were all operated under fifth freedom rights. From its 1962 initiation of Boeing 707 service to Idlewild (renamed JFK in 1964), flights had intermediate stops at one Middle East airport (Kuwait, Cairo, or Beirut), then two or three European airports, the last of which was always London's Heathrow, with trans-Atlantic service operating between Heathrow and JFK. This service continued well into the Boeing 747 era. Currently, Air India's North American flights are nonstop Boeing 777 service to India, with one exception, that being a revival of fifth freedom flights operating Boeing 787 service on the Newark—Heathrow—Ahmedabad route. However, Air India does not currently operate that route.

The fifth freedom has been discussed in 2017 in connection with the Saint Helena Airport. Flights (by a South African airline) serving it have to refuel at Walvis Bay Airport; but they are not allowed to board more passengers coming from connecting flights, which means that passengers from Johannesburg must do a detour over Cape Town with fairly little connecting time, with risk of missing the once-weekly flight.

==== Sixth freedom ====
The unofficial sixth freedom combines the third and fourth freedoms and is the right to carry passengers or cargo from a second country to a third country by stopping in one's own country. It can also be characterized as a form of the fifth freedom with an intermediate stop in the operating airline's home market. This characterization is often invoked as protectionist policy as the traffic, like fifth freedom traffic, is secondary in nature to third and fourth freedom traffic. Consequently, some nations seek to regulate sixth freedom traffic as though it were fifth freedom traffic.

Sixth-freedom traffic has historically been widespread in Asia, where Southeast Asian carriers such as Thai Airways and Singapore Airlines carried traffic on the Kangaroo Route between Europe and Australia, and Japanese carriers carried traffic between Southeast Asia and the Americas. More recently, carriers in the Persian Gulf region have developed intercontinental sixth-freedom hubs, and Copa Airlines has developed a sixth-freedom hub in Panama to connect many cities in North and South America. Another example is Air Canada, which has pursued a strategy of carrying passengers between the US and points in Europe and Asia through its Canadian hubs.

While sixth freedom operations are rarely legally restricted, they may be controversial: for example, Qantas has complained that Emirates, Singapore Airlines and other sixth-freedom carriers have unfair advantages in the market between Europe and Australia.

Because the nature of air services agreements is essentially a mercantilist negotiation that strives for an equitable exchange of traffic rights, the outcome of a bilateral agreement may not be fully reciprocal but rather a reflection of the relative size and geographic position of two markets, especially in the case of a large country negotiating with a much smaller one. In exchange for a smaller state granting fifth freedom rights to a larger country, the smaller country may be able to gain sixth freedom traffic to onward destinations from the larger country.

On 2 October 2007, the United Kingdom and Singapore signed an agreement that allowed unlimited sixth freedom rights from 30 March 2018, along with a full exchange of other freedoms of the air.

=== Cabotage ===
Cabotage is the transport of goods or passengers between two points in the same country by a vessel or an aircraft registered in another country. Originally a shipping term, cabotage now covers aviation, railways and road transport. It is "trade or navigation in coastal waters, or, the exclusive right of a country to operate the air traffic within its territory".

==== Modified sixth freedom (indirect cabotage) ====
The unofficial modified sixth freedom is the right to carry passengers or cargo between two points in one foreign country, while making a stop in the home country.

For example, (the unofficial modified sixth freedom): a Canadian carrier departs from a US airport, stops in its Canadian hub and departs/continues onward to a different US airport.

==== Seventh and ninth freedoms (standalone cabotage) ====
The unofficial seventh and ninth freedoms are variations of the fifth freedom. It is the right to carry passengers or cargo in foreign territories without any service to, from or via one's own country. The seventh freedom is to provide international services between two foreign countries, and the ninth between points within a single foreign country.

In May 2026, the Israeli Transportation Ministry proposed giving Emirates permission to add seventh freedom flights from Ben Gurion Airport to destinations including New York City and Bangkok. The proposal could help cut fares for passengers from Ben Gurion Airport while impacting incumbent airlines serving routes to and from Israel.

The right to carry passengers or cargo within a foreign country without continuing service to or from one's own country, is sometimes known as "stand-alone cabotage". It differs from the aviation definition of "true cabotage" in that it does not directly relate to one's own country.

==== Eighth freedom (consecutive cabotage) ====
The unofficial eighth freedom is the right to carry passengers or cargo between two or more points in one foreign country and is also known as cabotage. It is extremely rare outside Europe. The main example is the European Union, where such rights exist between all its member states. Other examples include the Single Aviation Market (SAM) established between Australia and New Zealand in 1996; the 2001 Protocol to the Multilateral Agreement on the Liberalization of International Air Transportation (MALIAT) between Brunei, Chile, New Zealand and Singapore; United Airlines' "Island Hopper" route, from Guam to Honolulu, able to transport passengers within the Federated States of Micronesia and the Marshall Islands, although the countries involved are closely associated with the United States. Such rights have usually been granted only where the domestic air network is very underdeveloped. One instance was Pan Am's authority to fly between Frankfurt and West Berlin from the 1950s to the 1980s, although political circumstances and not the state of the domestic air network dictated this – only airlines of the Allied Powers of France, the United Kingdom and the United States had the right to carry air traffic between West Germany and the legally separate and distinct territory of West Berlin until 1990. In 2005, the United Kingdom and New Zealand concluded an agreement granting unlimited cabotage rights. Given the distance between the two countries, the agreement can be seen as reflecting a political principle rather than an expectation that these rights will be taken up in the near future. Similarly, New Zealand had exchanged eighth-freedom rights with Ireland in 1999.

== See also ==
- Air rights
- Bilateral agreement
- Air transport agreement
- Freedom of movement
- Flight permits
- Treaty on Open Skies for unarmed aerial surveillance flights
