= Object Permanence (film) =

Polish drama film

Object Permenance
- Directed by: Filip Jan Rymsza
- Screenplay by: Filip Jan Rymsza
- Produced by: Filip Jan Rymsza; Marta Lewandowska
- Starring: Millie Brady; Alastair Mackenzie; Jessica Frances Dukes; Debi Mazar
- Production company: Friends with Benefits Studio
- Country: Poland
- Language: English

Object Permanence is an upcoming Polish film from Filip Jan Rymsza, starring Millie Brady, Alastair Mackenzie, Jessica Frances Dukes and Debi Mazar.

== Premise ==
Set in the near future, supermodel turned lifestyle mogul Brook Brookes becomes the first person to IPO (Initial Public Offering) themselves.

== Cast ==
- Millie Brady
- Alastair Mackenzie
- Jessica Frances Dukes
- Debi Mazar
- Weronika Rosati

== Production ==
The English-language film is written and directed by Filip Jan Rymsza. It is produced by Friends with Benefits Studio, with co-financing by the Polish Film Institute and in partnership with ATM Grupa S.A. and Marta Lewandowska and Rymsza as the producers.

The cast is led by Millie Brady. In October 2022, Alastair Mackenzie, Jessica Frances Dukes and Debi Mazar joined the cast. Weronika Rosati also appears in the film.

Principal photography took place in Poland in October 2022.
