= Trash TV (film) =

British drama film

- Directed by: Danny Lee
- Screenplay by: Danny Lee
- Produced by: Gail Lyon; Rosie Fellner; Craig Conway; Kirsten Stoddart
- Starring: Millie Brady; Noah Taylor
- Production company: Turnover XXV
- Country: United Kingdom
- Language: English

Trash TV is an upcoming independent British satirical drama film written and directed by Danny Lee and starring Millie Brady and Noah Taylor.

== Premise ==
A satirical dark drama depicting the fall of an angry talk show host live on air during his show's 4,000th episode.

== Cast ==
- Millie Brady
- Noah Taylor
- Robert Cavanah
- Dave Johns
- Rosie Fellner

== Production ==
The film is written and directed by Danny Lee in his feature length debut. The film is produced by Gail Lyon, Rosie Fellner, Craig Conway and Kirsten Stoddart, and is made by Turnover XXV in partnership with Sunderland University. Principal photography was underway in the United Kingdom in July 2025, with filming taking place in Sunderland and the North-East of England.

The cast is led by Millie Brady and Noah Taylor and also includes Robert Cavanah, Dave Johns and Fellner.

== Release ==
The film is set to be released in 2026.
