= A Final Cut for Orson =

- Film poster
- Directed by: Ryan Suffern
- Produced by: Frank Marshall; Filip Jan Rymsza
- Starring: Peter Bogdanovich; Frank Marshall; Filip Jan Rymsza; Bob Murawski
- Cinematography: Michael Parry; Ryan Suffern
- Edited by: Martin Singer
- Music by: Paul Pilot
- Distributed by: Netflix
- Release date: September 1, 2018 (Telluride Film Festival)
- Running time: 38 minutes
- Country: United States
- Language: English

A Final Cut for Orson: 40 Years in the Making is a 2018 American documentary short, directed by Ryan Suffern, revolving around the completion of The Other Side of the Wind, directed by Orson Welles. It offers a glimpse behind the scenes into the complicated process of recovering and completing what Welles had intended to be his Hollywood comeback film in the 1970s. The documentary short and The Other Side of the Wind were produced by Frank Marshall and Filip Jan Rymsza.

A Final Cut for Orson premiered at the Telluride Film Festival on September 1, 2018. It was released on November 2, 2018 by Netflix.

== Cast ==
- Peter Bogdanovich
- Frank Marshall
- Filip Jan Rymsza
- Bob Murawski
- Michel Legrand
- Ruth Hasty
- Mo Henry
- Danny Huston

== Production ==
In May 2015, Rymsza revealed during a panel talk at Indiana University that fellow producer Marshall had been chronicling the completion of The Other Side of the Wind for a potential documentary. A Final Cut for Orson was produced by The Kennedy / Marshall Company in association with Rymsza's Royal Road Entertainment. Suffern, who also directed Finding Oscar, is head of the documentary division at Kennedy / Marshall.

== Release ==
A Final Cut for Orson had its premiere at the 46th Telluride Film Festival on September 1, 2018, where it was shown alongside The Other Side of the Wind and Morgan Neville’s companion documentary They’ll Love Me When I’m Dead. A Final Cut for Orson had been scheduled to screen a day earlier at the Venice Film Festival with The Other Side of the Wind, but was pulled without explanation. It debuted on Netflix on November 2, 2018.

== Reception ==
The website Wellesnet called Suffern's documentary short a "38-minute hidden gem, which expertly chronicles precisely how behind the scenes artisans combed through 1,083 reels of negative and film elements, carefully piecing together the movie in a painstaking effort to honor Welles’ artistic vision.

The Gate wrote, "A Final Cut for Orson is a must-see for anyone interested in seeing how tremendously difficult it can be to restore or reassemble a motion picture from scratch... The Other Side of the Wind was truly ahead of its time, and A Final Cut for Orson shows how the people who realized the film’s potential weren’t willing to let it slip through the hourglass of time."

Leonard Maltin wrote, "Frank Marshall and Ryan Suffern’s A Final Cut for Orson: 40 Years in the Making is an excellent chronicle of how they and a loyal team of Wellesians overcame one obstacle after another to piece his last feature film together."

A Final Cut for Orson's editor, Martin Singer, was nominated for an ACE " Eddie" Award in the Best Edited Documentary (Non-Theatrical) category by the American Cinema Editors guild in 2019.
