= Millie Brady =

English actress

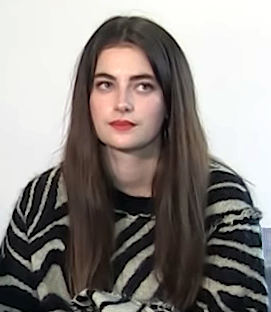
- Brady in 2018
- Born: Camilla Eve Brady; 24 December 1993 (age 32); Bracknell, Berkshire, England
- Occupations: Actress; model
- Years active: 2013–present

Camilla Eve Brady (born 24 December 1993) is an English actress and model. On television, she is known for her roles in the Netflix series The Last Kingdom (2017–2022) as Æthelflæd and the Apple TV+ series Surface (2022–2025). Her films include Pride and Prejudice and Zombies (2016) and Double Blind (2023).

== Early life ==
Brady was born in Bracknell, Berkshire and moved around the country as a child. She went to school at St Mary's School from the ages of 11 to 18. Interested in acting from a young age, she modelled as a teenager to save money to move to London.

== Career ==
Brady made her television debut in the second series of the ITV series Mr Selfridge and her film debut as Joan Collins in Legend. She then signed with Premier Model Management, walking her first runway and landing a brand campaign with Miu Miu. She played Mary Bennet in the 2016 comedy horror film Pride and Prejudice and Zombies. In 2015, she was set to star in a TV adaptation of the novel The Clan of the Cave Bear; however, Lifetime cancelled the series before it ever went into production.

In 2017, Brady joined the main cast of The Last Kingdom for its second series as Lady Æthelflæd. She had film roles in King Arthur: Legend of the Sword (2017), Teen Spirit (2018), and Intrigo: Samaria (2019). In 2020, she starred in two miniseries: White House Farm on ITV as Sally Jones and Roadkill on BBC One as Lily Laurence. She also had a minor role in The Queen's Gambit on Netflix.

In June 2021, it was announced Brady would appear in the Apple TV+ miniseries Surface, which premiered 29 July 2022. Brady made her Off West End debut in February 2022 appearing in an English-language translation of the play The Forest by Florian Zeller at the Hampstead Theatre, directed by Jonathan Kent.

In April 2022, Brady was cast in the horror-thriller film Double Blind alongside Pollyanna McIntosh. In August 2022 it was announced that Brady would star as the lead in the Filip Jan Rymza-directed feature film Object Permanence, playing "Brooke Brooks, a former supermodel who becomes a highly successful lifestyle mogul and the first person to IPO (Initial Public Offering) herself." Filming is set to begin September 2022 in Poland, Germany and Thailand.

== Personal life ==
Brady resides in Hampstead in North London with her older sister Caroline. She has a dog named Luna.

== Filmography ==
=== Film ===
| Year | Title | Role | Notes | Ref(s) |
|---|---|---|---|---|
| 2015 | Legend | Joan Collins | | |
| 2016 | Pride and Prejudice and Zombies | Mary Bennet | | |
| 2017 | King Arthur: Legend of the Sword | Princess Catia | | |
| 2018 | Teen Spirit | Anastasia | | |
| 2019 | Intrigo: Samaria | Vera | | |
| 2023 | Double Blind | Claire | | IMDb |
| TBA | Object Permanence | Brooke Brooks | Post-production | |
| TBA | Trash TV | | Post-production | |

=== Television ===
| Year | Title | Role | Notes | Ref(s) |
|---|---|---|---|---|
| 2014 | Mr Selfridge | Violette Selfridge | Recurring role (series 2) | |
| 2017–2022 | The Last Kingdom | Lady Æthelflæd | Main role (series 2–5) | |
| 2020 | White House Farm | Sally Jones | Miniseries | |
| 2020 | Roadkill | Lily Laurence | Miniseries | |
| 2020 | The Queen's Gambit | Cleo | Miniseries, 2 episodes | |
| 2022 | Gramercy Park | Kate Donovan | Main role | |
| 2022–2025 | Surface | Eliza | Main role | |

== Stage ==
| Year | Title | Role | Notes |
|---|---|---|---|
| 2022 | The Forest | Sara | Hampstead Theatre, London |
