= Mosquito State =

2020 psychological thriller film

- Poster
- Directed by: Filip Jan Rymsza
- Screenplay by: Filip Jan Rymsza; Mario Zermeno
- Produced by: Filip Jan Rymsza; Włodzimierz Niderhaus; Alyssa Swanzey
- Starring: Beau Knapp; Charlotte Vega; Jack Kesy; Olivier Martinez; Audrey Wasilewski
- Cinematography: Eric Koretz
- Edited by: Andrew Hafitz; Bob Murawski; Wojciech Janas
- Music by: Cezary Skubiszewski
- Production companies: Royal Road Entertainment; WFDiF
- Distributed by: AMC Networks (USA, Canada, UK, Ireland, Australia, New Zealand); Kino Świat (Poland)
- Release dates: 4 September 2020 (Venice); 26 August 2021 (United States)
- Running time: 100 minutes
- Countries: Poland; United States
- Language: English

Mosquito State (Polish: Komar) is a 2020 Polish-American psychological thriller film co-written, directed, and produced by Filip Jan Rymsza. It stars Beau Knapp as a "Wall Street genius who becomes the willing host to a colony of mosquitoes".

A review in The New York Times called it "a disquieting merger of body horror and social commentary... pierced by moments of disturbing beauty".

The film had its world premiere on 4 September 2020 at the Venice Film Festival, where it won the Bisato d'Oro for Best Cinematography.

== Plot ==
Richard Boca is a Wall Street analyst who has developed an algorithm he believes will make him rich. His near-obsessive fascination with flying insects, and especially his study of the behavior of bees, has led him to develop the "Honeybee" analysis model, which can be used to predict developments in financial markets. After a dream, he decides to develop a new analytical model, based on swarms of mosquitoes.

Richard meets Lena, an attractive young woman who funds her studies by working at a wine bar, and brings her to his apartment. He lives alone in a penthouse with a view of Central Park. Swarms of mosquitoes have infested his residence, and Richard soon begins to swell up from their stings.

When he goes back to work, Richard is covered with insect bites from head to toe. He exhorts his colleagues to stop trading if they don't want to further destabilize the market, but his warnings go unheeded. Richard withdraws to his apartment and starts feeding his own body to the mosquitoes.

== Cast ==
- Beau Knapp as Richard Boca
- Charlotte Vega as Lena del Alcázar
- Jack Kesy as Beau Harris
- Olivier Martinez as Edward Werner
- Audrey Wasilewski as Sally the Secretary

== Production ==
Filip Jan Rymsza directed the film and wrote the script together with Mario Zermeno. After Sandcastles and Dustclouds, it is the third feature film by the Polish-US filmmaker and short story writer. Production began in August 2018 on film stages in Warsaw, Poland and later continued on location in New York City.

== Release ==
On 3 June 2021, it was announced that AMC Networks acquired distribution rights for the film and that it would premiere on 26 August 2021 as an exclusive on Shudder, their streaming platform.

=== Critical reception ===
Mosquito State received mostly positive reviews from film critics. It holds a 62% approval rating on review aggregator website Rotten Tomatoes, based on 26 reviews.

Jeannette Catsoulis from The New York Times made it her Critic's Pick, calling it "a disquieting merger of body horror and social commentary. Mosquito State has a dreamlike, almost dazed quality, pierced by moments of disturbing beauty. Admirable for its total refusal to ingratiate, the movie nurtures an unapologetically hostile vibe that gradually relents alongside Richard's deterioration".

The Guardian's Phil Hoad gave the film four out of five stars, calling it "thrillingly alive... a torrid, original tone poem to late capitalism".

=== Accolades ===
Mosquito State had a world premiere as an Out of Competition, Official Selection at the 77th Venice Film Festival, where The International Association of Film Critics awarded it the Bisato d’Oro for Best Cinematography, citing it as "A masterful work that gives life to a Kafkaesque reality, rendering us unable to escape our dreams and nightmares. A film full of metaphors and visions that, thanks to its photography, gives strange, but decisive and extreme, emotions".

It was nominated for Best Film in the Official Fantàstic Competition and awarded for Best Special Effects (Maks Naporowski, Filip Jan Rymsza, Dariush Derakhshani) at the Sitges Film Festival.
