= Trinafour =

Coordinates: 56.754620°N 4.086872°W

Trinafour: Scottish Gaelic: Trian a' Phùir
- Location within Perth and Kinross
- OS grid reference: NN725645
  - Edinburgh: 65 mi (105 km)
  - London: 396 mi (637 km)
- Council area: Perth and Kinross
- Country: Scotland
- Sovereign state: United Kingdom
- Post town: PITLOCHRY
- Postcode district: PH16
- Dialling code: 01796
- Police: Scotland
- Fire: Scottish
- Ambulance: Scottish
- UK Parliament: Angus and Perthshire Glens
- Scottish Parliament: Perthshire North

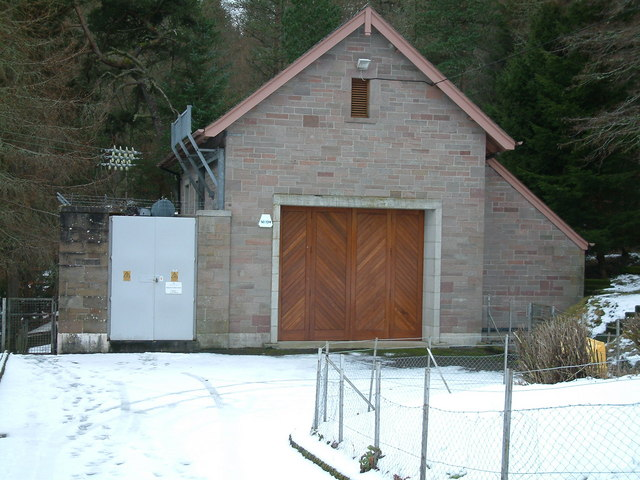
The small hydro-electric power station at Trinafour is driven by water piped above-ground from the Loch Errochty

Trinafour (/ˌtrɪnəˈfʊər/; Scottish Gaelic: Trian a' Phùir) is a village in Perth and Kinross, Scotland, approximately 17 miles (27 km) north-west of Pitlochry, its nearest town. It is located at the western edge of Glen Errochty.

The actor Alastair Mackenzie was born in Trinafour.
