= Loch Errochty =

Loch in Perth and Kinross, Scotland

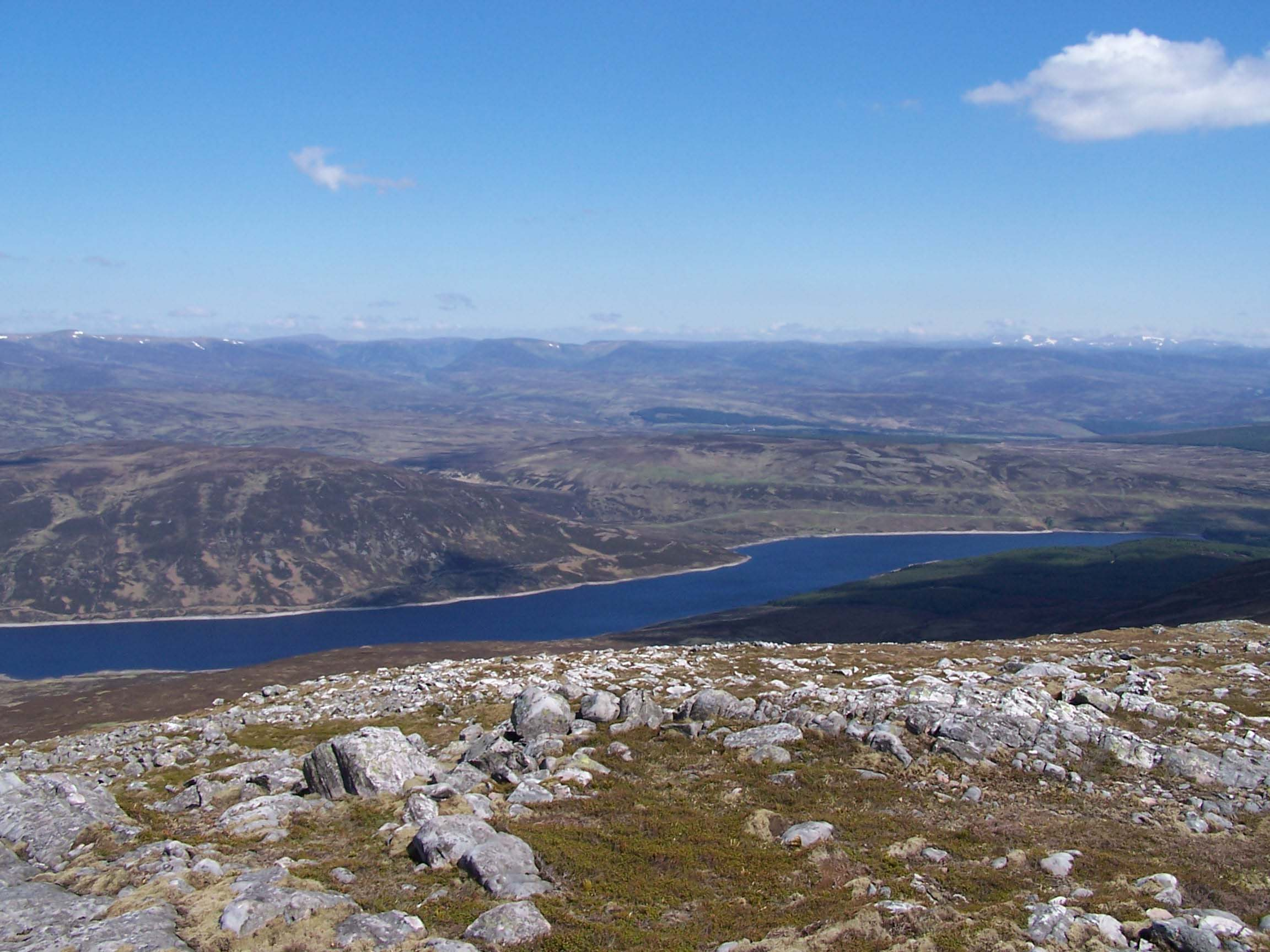
- The eastern end from Beinn a' Chuallaich

- Location within Perth and Kinross
- Location: Perth and Kinross, Scotland
- Coordinates: 56°45′40″N 4°8′40″W
- Type: freshwater loch, reservoir
- Basin countries: United Kingdom
- Max. length: 5 km (3.1 mi)
- Max. width: 1 km (0.62 mi)
- Surface area: 3.03 km^{2} (1.17 sq mi)
- Surface elevation: 330 m (1,080 ft)

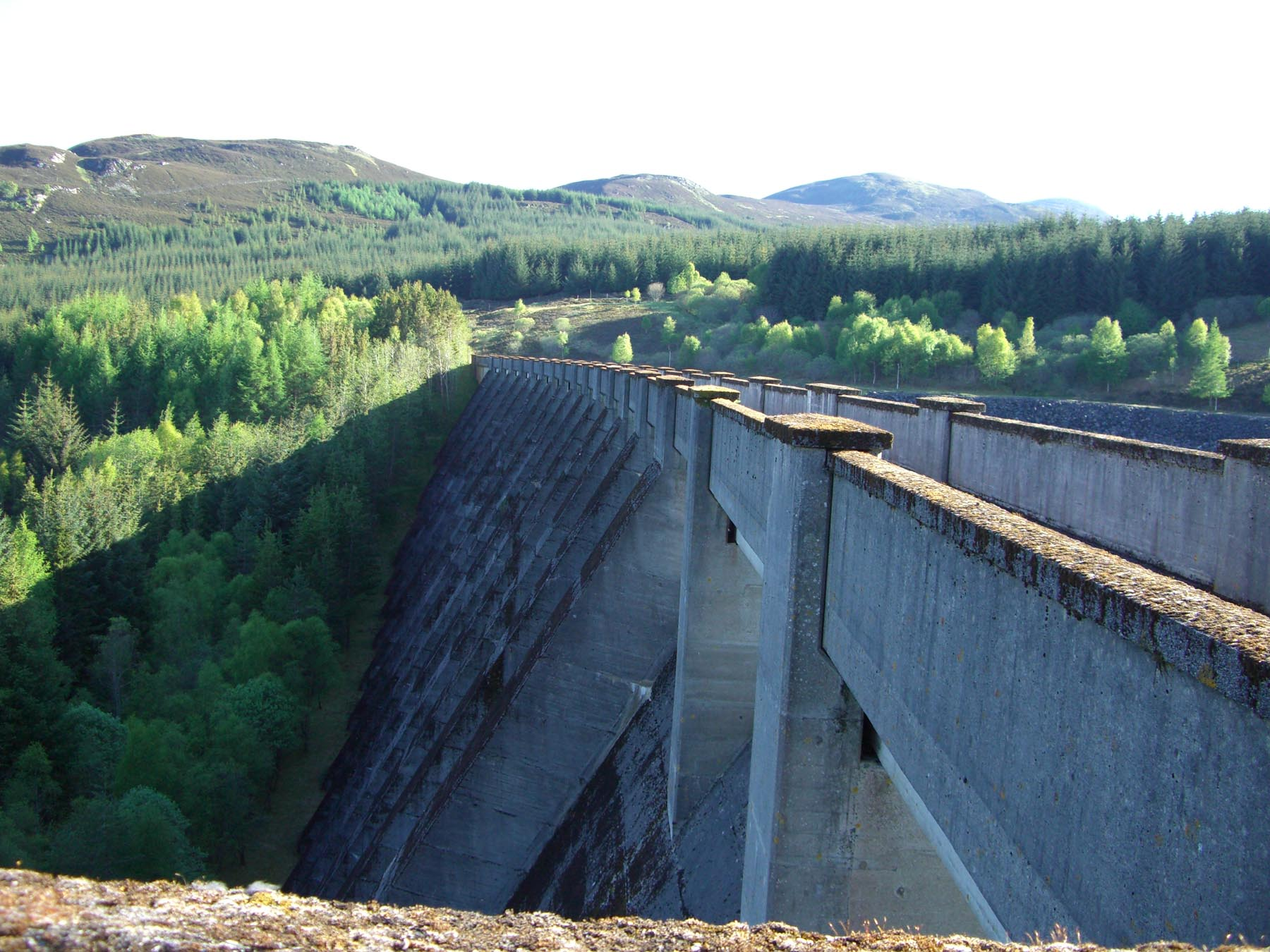
The loch is impounded by a “diamond-headed” buttress dam.

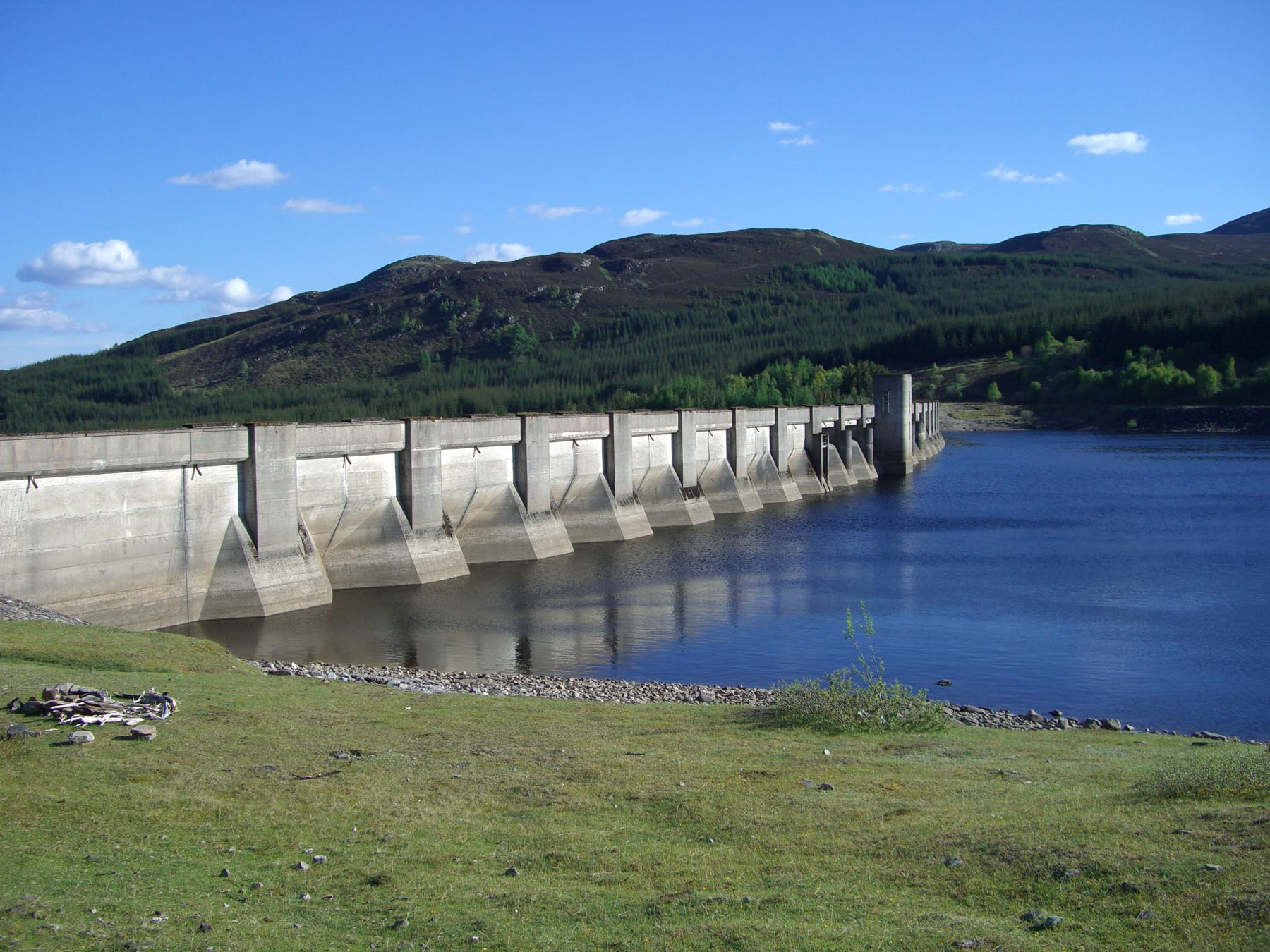
The dam wall with the gatehouse in the middle which releases compensation water for the Errochty Water.

Loch Errochty is a man made freshwater loch situated within the Perth and Kinross council area at the edge of the Scottish Highlands near the Highland Boundary Fault where the topography changes to lowland.

== Overview ==
The Errochty dam lies at the head of Glen Errochty, two km NW of the hamlet of Trinafour at the approximate grid reference of NN689654. The loch has an area of 303 hectares and is 5 km long and a kilometre across at its widest point. The loch is entirely man made, being created by the damming of the Errochty Water, the river which runs down the glen. The dam was constructed in 1957 by the contractors A. & M. Carmichael Ltd as part of phase two of the Tummel hydro-electric power scheme. The loch stands at 330 metres above sea level. The dam itself is an example of a diamond-headed buttress dam, it is 49 metres high and 354 metres across. The diamond-headed buttresses provide extra strength to deal with possible tremors from the Highland Boundary Fault which runs just to the south of Pitlochry. Water from Loch Errochty is diverted through a 10 km long tunnel to the Errochty hydroelectricity power station at the western end of Loch Tummel. The gatehouse for the tunnel at Loch Errochty is near the southern shore, the actual intake is beneath it at the bottom of the loch. The power station has a maximum output of 75 MW and is the largest power producer of the nine main stations in the Tummel scheme. Water is released from the dam to compensate the flow of the Errochty Water, this compensation water flows down a pipeline for 1.5 km to the very small 500 kW hydro power station at Trinafour before being released into the Errochty Water.

== Water supply to the loch ==
Loch Errochty's main feeder streams are the Allt Sléibh and the Allt Ruighe nan Saorach which both rise in the high ground to the west of the head of the loch. Other small streams flow directly off the 892-metre-high (2,927 ft) mountain of Beinn a' Chuallaich which stands just to the south. Supplementary water is diverted into the loch from the east by the Errochty catchwater, a system of tunnels and surface pipelines at a height of approximately 380 metres which redirects water from five small tributary streams of the River Garry, and the Garry itself. The catchwater then goes through a tunnel in the hill which separates the Garry and Errochty valleys to join the loch. This method of re-directing water allows it to be used more often to generate electricity. Some of the water within the Tummel scheme passes through five of the power stations and thus generates electricity five times.

== Access and fishing ==
The north shore of the loch has a narrow surfaced road which is not open to general traffic, there being a locked gate at Trinafour to prevent access. The south side of the loch has extensive woodlands in the area around the dam wall. A track goes through the woodland from Trinafour and then continues in open country along the south shore until it reaches the ruin of Ruighe nan Saorach. Recreational fishing is popular on the loch with some large specimens of Pike and Perch being present. There are no salmon in the loch as a fish ladder has not been provided to allow the passage of migrating fish past the dam. Permits to fish are required from the Auchleeks estate.

== Old buildings ==
The southern shore of the loch has numerous remains of old buildings. This is believed to be the remnants of old sheep farms which were in the valley before it was flooded. The remains include old farmsteads, shielings and sheep pens, some with walls 30 cm (12 ins) high. Many more of the remains are now believed to be under water.

== Popular culture ==
The dam and some interior tunnels were used for location filming in episode 705 of the television series "Outlander".
