= Surface (2022 TV series) =

2022 television series

- Promotional poster
- Genre: Psychological thriller
- Created by: Veronica West
- Starring: Gugu Mbatha-Raw; Oliver Jackson-Cohen; Ari Graynor; François Arnaud; Millie Brady; Marianne Jean-Baptiste; Stephan James
- Composer: Ólafur Arnalds
- Country of origin: United States
- Original language: English
- No. of seasons: 2
- No. of episodes: 16

Production
- Executive producers: Gugu Mbatha-Raw; Sam Miller; Veronica West; Reese Witherspoon; Lauren Neustadter
- Producers: Ashley Strumwasser; Jon Wu; Jim O'Grady
- Cinematography: Tami Reiker; Elie Smolkin; Claudine Sauvé
- Editors: Matthew Ramsey; Rebecca Valente; Victoria Grimsley
- Running time: 43–53 minutes
- Production companies: West Picture Co.; Hello Sunshine

Original release
- Network: Apple TV+
- Release: July 29, 2022 – April 11, 2025

Surface is an American psychological thriller television series created by Veronica West for Apple TV+. It stars Gugu Mbatha-Raw as Sophie Ellis, a woman suffering from extreme memory loss after a supposed suicide attempt. As she tries to rebuild her life, she begins to suspect that what she has been told about her past may not be true.

The series premiered on July 29, 2022. In December 2022, it was renewed for a second season, which aired from February 21, 2025 to April 11, 2025.

== Synopsis ==
After an apparent suicide attempt in which she jumps from a San Francisco ferry, Sophie Ellis has amnesia. She starts a new life with her husband, James, a venture capitalist, but struggles to recall the events that led to her memory loss. She discovers she had been having an affair with Thomas Baden, an undercover policeman. As Sophie’s recollections of her past life in England resurface she must return there to uncover more about herself.

== Cast ==
=== Main ===
- Gugu Mbatha-Raw as Sophie Ellis / Tess Caldwell, a woman whose memory has become fragmented following an apparent suicide attempt
- Oliver Jackson-Cohen as James Ellis, Sophie's husband, who works at a high profile investment firm, Ascendant
- Millie Brady as Eliza Huntley (season 2), a woman from Tess' past who lives in London
- Ari Graynor as Caroline (season 1), Sophie's best friend
- François Arnaud as Harrison (season 1), James's friend who also works at Ascendant
- Marianne Jean-Baptiste as Hannah (season 1), Sophie's therapist
- Stephan James as Thomas Baden (season 1), an undercover cop having an affair with Sophie
- Phil Dunster as Quinn Huntley (season 2), Eliza's brother and the future heir to the Huntley estate
- Gavin Drea as Callum Walsh (season 2), an investigative journalist for the news magazine The Brittanian, pursuing a story involving the Huntley estate
- Rupert Graves as Henry Huntley (season 2), son of William Huntley, father of Quinn and Eliza, current patriarch of the Huntley estate
- Tara Fitzgerald as Anna Huntley (season 2), Henry Huntley's sister
- Nina Sosanya as Julia (season 2), Callum Walsh's boss at The Brittanian
- Joely Richardson as Olivia (season 2), Henry Huntley's wife
- Freida Pinto as Grace (season 2), Quinn Huntley's fiancee

=== Recurring ===
- Christin Park as Victoria
- Markian Tarasiuk as Elliot (season 1), a mutual friend of Sophie and James
- Andres Joseph as Todd (season 1), another employee at Ascendant with a drug habit
- John Macmillan as Richard Wilcox (season 2), the Huntleys' attorney
- Nicholas Karimi as Lucas (season 2), a security and surveillance operator, frequently employed by the Huntleys
- Isabella Laughland as Claire (season 2), Callum Walsh's research assistant
- Callie Cooke as Margot (season 2), Eliza's new girlfriend
- Julian Glover as William Huntley (season 2), elder patriarch of the Huntleys
- Mina Andala as Katherine (season 2), former employee of the Huntley estate, a family friend of Sophie's
- Billy Dunmore as Nicholas (season 2), a bartender in London
- Abigail Weinstock as Katie (season 2), Quinn's secretary

== Episodes ==
=== Series overview ===
Season	Episodes	Originally released	
Season	Episodes	First released	Last released
1	8	July 29, 2022	September 2, 2022
2	8	February 21, 2025	April 11, 2025

=== Season 1 (2022) ===
No. overall	No. in season	Title	Directed by	Written by	Original release date
1	1	"Ictus"	Sam Miller	Veronica West	July 29, 2022
2	2	"Muscle Memory"	Sam Miller	Erica L. Anderson	July 29, 2022
3	3	"New Person, Same Old Mistakes"	Kevin Rodney Sullivan	Tony Saltzman	July 29, 2022
4	4	"Psychogenic"	Kevin Rodney Sullivan	Glenise Mullins & Leigh Ann Biety	August 5, 2022
5	5	"It Comes in Waves"	Sam Miller	Dan Lee West	August 12, 2022
6	6	"The Myth of California"	Sam Miller	Veronica West & Raven Jackson	August 19, 2022
7	7	"It Was Always Going to End This Way"	Jennifer Morrison	Martín Zimmerman	August 26, 2022
8	8	"See You on the Other Side"	Tucker Gates	Story by : Dan Lee West & Veronica West; Teleplay by : Veronica West	September 2, 2022

=== Season 2 (2025) ===
No. overall	No. in season	Title	Directed by	Written by	Original release date
9	1	"New Money"	Ed Lilly	Veronica West	February 21, 2025
10	2	"Speak of the Devil"	Ed Lilly	Lillian Yu	February 28, 2025
11	3	"Kintsugi"	Ed Lilly	Peter Calloway	March 7, 2025
12	4	"Legacy"	Jon East	Dan Lee West	March 14, 2025
13	5	"Daybreak"	Lynsey Miller	Cortney Norris	March 21, 2025
14	6	"Atonement"	Lynsey Miller	Peter Calloway	March 28, 2025
15	7	"What Comes Around"	Jon East	Dan Lee West	April 4, 2025
16	8	"Unearthed"	Alrick Riley	Veronica West	April 11, 2025

== Production ==
The project was given a straight to series order in November 2020, with Gugu Mbatha-Raw set to star as well as serve as a co-executive producer. In June 2021, Oliver Jackson-Cohen, Stephan James, Ari Graynor, Marianne Jean-Baptiste, François Arnaud and Millie Brady were added to the cast. Filming for the series had begun by July 1, 2021, in Vancouver.

The series premiered on July 29, 2022, with the first three episodes available immediately and the rest debuting on a weekly basis. On December 2, 2022, the series was renewed for a second season, with production moving to London. Phil Dunster and Freida Pinto were added to the cast between April and May 2023.

== Reception ==
The review aggregator website Rotten Tomatoes reported a 46% approval rating for the 1st season based on 26 critic reviews. The website's critics consensus reads, "Gugu Mbatha-Raw's captivating performance gives Surface some depth, but this overheated potboiler only gets murkier the more it tries to spice up a derivative amnesia mystery." Metacritic, which uses a weighted average, assigned a score of 49 out of 100 based on 16 critics, indicating "mixed or average reviews". The review aggregator website Rotten Tomatoes reported a 56% approval rating for the 2nd season based on 9 critic reviews.
