= Sinatra: All or Nothing at All =

- Release poster
- Directed by: Alex Gibney
- Country of origin: United States
- Original language: English

Production
- Producers: Erin Edeiken; Blair Foster; Alex Gibney; Frank Marshall; Jeffrey Pollack; Samuel D. Pollard; Sharon Hall; Broderick Johnson; Andrew A. Kosove; Nancy Sinatra
- Cinematography: Antonio Rossi; Samuel Painter
- Editors: Samuel D. Pollard; Ben Sozanski; Anoosh Tertzakian
- Running time: 240 minutes
- Production companies: Alcon Television Group; Jigsaw Productions; The Kennedy/Marshall Company

Original release
- Network: HBO
- Release: April 5 – April 6, 2015

Sinatra: All or Nothing at All is an American documentary film directed by Alex Gibney. It was released in two parts on April 5 and 6, 2015 on HBO and received positive reviews from critics.

== Production ==
On January 8, 2015, HBO announced at the annual Television Critics Association's winter press tour that they would air a new documentary from director Alex Gibney about the life of singer and actor Frank Sinatra, entitled Sinatra: All or Nothing at All.

== Release ==
On March 6, 2015, HBO released the documentary's official trailer. On January 22, 2015, it was announced that the film would premiere in two parts on April 5 and 6, 2015.

On March 31, 2015, the film held its official premiere at the Time Warner Center in New York City, New York.

== Reception ==
On the review aggregator website Rotten Tomatoes, 93% of 15 critics' reviews are positive, with an average rating of 6.90/10. The website's consensus reads: "Sinatra: All or Nothing at All tackles its challenging subject with spectacular clips and interviews, offering a gratifying homage to a cultural icon." Metacritic, which uses a weighted average, assigned the season a score of 74 out of 100 based on 11 critics, indicating "generally favorable" reviews.
