= Destination Wedding =

- Theatrical release poster
- Directed by: Victor Levin
- Written by: Victor Levin
- Produced by: Elizabeth Dell; Robert Jones; Gail Lyon
- Starring: Winona Ryder; Keanu Reeves
- Cinematography: Giorgio Scali
- Edited by: Matt Maddox
- Music by: William Ross; Paul Joseph Smith
- Production companies: The Fyzz Facility; Elevated Films; Sunshine Pictures; Two Camel Films
- Distributed by: Regatta
- Release date: August 31, 2018
- Running time: 85 minutes
- Country: United States
- Language: English
- Budget: $5 million
- Box office: $2.2 million

Destination Wedding (Note: Credited onscreen as Destination Wedding, or A Narcissist Can't Die Because Then the Entire World Would End) is a 2018 American romantic comedy-drama film written and directed by Victor Levin. It stars Winona Ryder and Keanu Reeves as two people who meet while attending the same wedding in Paso Robles, California. It was released in the United States on August 31, 2018.

== Plot ==
Two middle-aged people, Frank and Lindsay, meet and then argue while waiting to board their flight at the airport. They are both annoyed when they realize they are seated next to each other in the small 8-seater airplane. Their annoyance increases when they learn they are on their way to the same destination wedding in Paso Robles. Frank and Lindsay know of each other as the groom, Keith, is Frank's maternal half-brother and Lindsay's former fiancé, whom they suspect deliberately set them up to meet. When they arrive at Paso Robles, they find they are staying in adjoining rooms at an inn. On their way to the inn, Frank reveals that he does not want to go to the wedding, and Lindsay reveals that she is attending the wedding to get closure from her relationship with Keith which ended six years ago. Frank runs marketing for J.D. Power and Associates, Lindsay is a prosecutor, and they both heavily criticize each other's jobs. At the rehearsal dinner on Friday night, they are seated next to each other and isolated from everyone else. They talk about the other guests. Frank shares his negative opinions of his family members along with the difficult history between them.

The next day, some activities, including a wine tasting, are planned before the wedding that night. Frank and Lindsay do not participate in the activities and instead spend that time talking to each other. Lindsay says she still loves Keith. Frank does not understand why she has not moved on. He says love is pointless, and Lindsay argues it is not. Frank says his family history has ruined his life, and Lindsay says he should get over it. They continue their conversation through the wedding that evening and criticize the other people there. During the dance afterward, they leave and walk together through the countryside. They run into a mountain lion, and Frank scares it off by making some loud noises. They try to run away but then fall and end up on the ground together. Lindsay thanks Frank for saving her life, and they kiss. After another discussion, they have sex. They then go back to Frank's room at the inn and spend time together in bed, talking, drinking, eating, and watching television. Frank compliments Lindsay's physical appearance, and she compliments his. Lindsay tells Frank she likes him and wants to be in a relationship with him. Frank refuses, saying a relationship between them would not work out. He is still convinced love is pointless. They argue but eventually fall asleep together.

On Sunday morning, they both leave the farewell brunch early and go to the airport. During their flight home, Lindsay keeps trying to convince Frank they should be together. She says it was a miracle two people like them made a connection and he should have some hope a relationship could work. Frank counters her arguments by saying it would not work and they should not try. He says he is content with being alone. Their plane lands, and they agree to not exchange contact information. Lindsay says her address out loud as Frank sees her off in a taxi. They both go back to their respective homes. That night, someone rings Lindsay's doorbell. She opens the door to see Frank standing there, and she smiles.

== Cast ==
- Winona Ryder as Lindsay
- Keanu Reeves as Frank
  - Lindsay and Frank are the only characters with dialogue.
- DJ Dallenbach as Ann
- Ted Dubost as Keith
- D. Rosh Wright as Frank's Mother
- Greg Lucey as Frank's Stepfather
- Clint Dubost as Father of the Bride
- Donna Lynn Jones as Frank's Stepfather's Girlfriend

== Production ==
Production wrapped in central California in August 2017. The film's score was composed by William Ross. According to Variety, the production budget was $5 million.

== Release and reception ==
In November 2017, Aviron Pictures acquired the distribution rights to the film, releasing it under their Regatta banner. It was released on August 31, 2018.

Destination Wedding earned $2.2 million at the box office worldwide.

On Rotten Tomatoes, the film holds an approval rating of 51% based on 86 reviews, and an average rating of 5.3/10. The website's critical consensus reads, "Destination Wedding reunites Keanu Reeves and Winona Ryder for a sour comedy whose initially promising misanthropic twist overpowers the chemistry of its leads." On Metacritic, the film has a weighted average score of 46 out of 100, based on 23 critics, indicating "mixed or average" reviews.

Michael Rechtshaffen of the Los Angeles Times panned the film, calling it "a stubbornly unfunny 86 minutes that feels a lot longer." Jeanette Catsoulis of The New York Times called the film "torture" adding "this would-be romantic comedy is grating, cheap-looking and a mighty drag: it also turns two seasoned, likable actors into characters you'll want to throttle long before the credits roll." Leah Greenblatt of Entertainment Weekly gave the film a C+, saying the script "comes on like a rom-com David Mamet freight train; its verbal turns are so wildly overwritten that all the actors can really do is hold on to the wheel well, racing through reams of ratatat dialogue."

More positively, Kate Erbland of IndieWire gave the film a B, saying "Maybe this is what falling in love is like, and it's high time that rom-coms had the space for weirdos like these." Benjamin Lee of The Guardian gave the film three out of five stars, admitting that "some of the dialogue does border on overwritten...there's enough wit and finely observed pedantry to make up for the occasional indulgence." Of the film's stars Lee said, "The pair share an easy, spiky chemistry and Reeves in particular shows himself to be surprisingly skilled at delivering such bile-filled dialogue."
