= Rather (film) =

- Film poster
- Directed by: Frank Marshall
- Written by: Dan Crane
- Cinematography: Michael Koshkin
- Edited by: Joe Fenstermaker; Curtis McConnell
- Music by: Jeff Beal
- Production companies: Anchor Entertainment; Original Productions; The Kennedy/Marshall Company; Wavelength Productions
- Distributed by: Netflix
- Release date: June 9, 2023 (Tribeca Film Festival); May 1, 2024 (Netflix)
- Running time: 95 minutes
- Country: United States
- Language: English

Rather is a 2023 American documentary film directed by Frank Marshall about the journalist and news anchor Dan Rather. It premiered at the Tribeca Film Festival in 2023 and was released on Netflix on May 1, 2024.

== Reception ==
On the review aggregator website Rotten Tomatoes, 94% of 18 critics' reviews are positive.

Daniel Fienberg of The Hollywood Reporter wrote, "Rather is fine. It's not definitive."
