= The Other Side of the Wind =

2018 satirical drama film

- Film poster
- Directed by: Orson Welles
- Written by: Orson Welles; Oja Kodar
- Produced by: Frank Marshall; Filip Jan Rymsza; Orson Welles
- Starring: John Huston; Oja Kodar; Peter Bogdanovich; Susan Strasberg; Norman Foster; Bob Random; Lilli Palmer; Edmond O'Brien; Mercedes McCambridge; Cameron Mitchell; Paul Stewart; Gregory Sierra; Tonio Selwart; Dan Tobin; Joseph McBride; Dennis Hopper
- Cinematography: Gary Graver
- Edited by: Bob Murawski; Orson Welles
- Music by: Michel Legrand
- Production companies: Americas Film Conservancy; Les Films de L'Astrophore; Royal Road Entertainment; SACI
- Distributed by: Netflix
- Release dates: August 31, 2018 (Venice); November 2, 2018 (United States)
- Running time: 122 minutes
- Countries: United States; France
- Languages: English; German
- Budget: $2 million (1970 USD); $6 million completion funds (2018 USD)

The Other Side of the Wind is a 2018 satirical drama film co-written, co-edited, and directed by Orson Welles, and posthumously released after 48 years in development. The film stars John Huston, Bob Random, Peter Bogdanovich, Susan Strasberg, and Oja Kodar.

Intended by Welles to be his American directorial comeback after years spent abroad, the film began shooting in 1970 and resumed on and off until 1976. Welles continued to work intermittently on editing the project into the 1980s, but it became embroiled in financial, legal, and political complications, which prevented it from being completed. Despite Welles's death in 1985, several attempts were made at reconstructing the unfinished film. The unreleased results were called "the Holy Grail of cinema". In 2014, the rights were acquired by Royal Road, and the completed project was overseen by Bogdanovich and producer Frank Marshall.

The story uses a film-within-a-film narrative, which follows the last day in the life of an aging Hollywood film director (Huston) as he hosts a screening party for his unfinished latest project. Using color and black-and-white footage, the film was shot on 8 mm and 16 mm in an unconventional documentary style, featuring a rapid-cutting approach between the many cameras of the story's numerous journalists and newspeople. It was intended, among other things, as a satire of both the passing of Classic Hollywood and of the avant-garde filmmakers of Europe and New Hollywood in the 1970s.

The Other Side of the Wind had its world premiere at the 75th Venice International Film Festival on August 31, 2018, and was released on November 2, 2018, by Netflix to critical praise, accompanied by a documentary, They'll Love Me When I'm Dead.

== Plot ==
Set some time in the early 1970s, the film opens by describing the final day of Jake Hannaford, an aging Hollywood director, who was killed in a car crash on his 70th birthday, with narration from an elderly Brooks Otterlake, who had been a protégé of Hannaford's. Just before his death, Hannaford was trying to revive his waning career by making an experimental film, laden with gratuitous sex scenes and violence, with mixed results. At the time of Hannaford's birthday party, this film (titled The Other Side of the Wind) has been left unfinished after its star stormed off the set, for reasons not immediately apparent to the audience.

A screening of some incomprehensible parts of Hannaford's unfinished film takes place, to attract "end money" from studio boss Max David. Hannaford himself is absent, and a loyal member of his entourage, the former child star Billy Boyle, makes an inept attempt to describe what the film is about. Intercut during this, various groups are seen setting out for Hannaford's party at an Arizona ranch. Hannaford arrives with a young Otterlake, a commercially successful director with a talent for mimicking celebrities, who credits much of his success to his close study of Hannaford.

Many journalists attending the party brandish cameras and ask invasive questions, eventually querying Hannaford's sexuality and whether he has long been a closeted homosexual, in spite of his macho public persona. Hannaford has a history of seducing the wife or girlfriend of each of his leading men, but maintains a strong attraction to the leading men themselves.

Several party guests comment on the conspicuous absence of John Dale, the star of Hannaford's latest film, whom Hannaford first discovered when Dale was attempting suicide by jumping into the Pacific Ocean off the Mexican coast. As the party proceeds, Hannaford finds out that Dale's suicide attempt had been faked, and that he had actually set off to Mexico to find Hannaford. Guests are shown more scenes from the film at the ranch's private screening room. One scene makes clear why Dale left the film—he stormed off the set in the middle of a sex scene in which he was being goaded by Hannaford off-screen.

As the party continues, Hannaford gets progressively drunker. He is washing his face in the bathroom when he breaks down in front of Otterlake, asking for the young director's help to revive his career. A series of power outages in the middle of the party interrupts the screening. The party continues by lantern light and eventually reconvenes to an empty drive-in cinema, where the last portion of the film is screened.

Having realized at the party that Otterlake is not going to financially support Hannaford's new film, the two have a mournful last exchange, realizing that their friendship is at an end. Intrusive journalist Juliette Rich has asked Hannaford the most explicit questions of all about his sexuality. At this moment, Hannaford slaps Rich in drunken outrage, while a drunken Boyle mounts an impassioned defense of the director. As dawn breaks at the ranch, Dale is walking around the mostly empty house, having only just arrived the morning after. He finally arrives at the drive-in just as a drunken Hannaford is leaving and asks him to get in the sports car with him, but Dale does not. Hannaford drives away, leading to his fatal car accident.

Hannaford's symbolic film finishes screening to a near-empty drive-in. The only person still watching is the actress who starred in it. She watches the final scene, and drives off as Hannaford's closing narration says:

"Who knows? Maybe you can stare too hard at something, huh? Drain out the virtue, suck out the living juice. You shoot the great places and the pretty people, all those girls and boys – shoot 'em dead."

=== Plot of the film-within-a-film ===
Hannaford's experimental film-within-a-film, shot as a spoof of European arthouse cinema typified by Antonioni, and performed without any dialogue, is visually striking, but has very little narrative coherence. The following scenes are shown, in this order:

- A graphic lesbian steamroom scene, rapidly intercut, featuring Oja Kodar, which Hannaford is in the process of filming.
- Several expressionistically shot chase scenes between Kodar and Bob Random (playing John Dale) amid the skyscrapers of Century City, Los Angeles, with various optical effects, in which it is not immediately apparent whose character is chasing whom. At the end of these scenes, he buys a doll for her, and she rebuffs him, driving off into the night with her boyfriend.
- The Actress and Dale meet again in a nightclub. She steps out into the toilets, where hippies are engaged in various sex acts, and changes her clothes, before coming back in again. He gives her the doll. She produces a pair of scissors, rapidly cutting the doll's hair, then cutting out its eyes. They step out of the nightclub into her boyfriend's 1968 Ford Mustang fastback. The car takes off in the rainy night, and as the boyfriend drives, the pair have sex in the passenger seat next to him. After a few minutes the boyfriend stops the car, grabs the girl, and attempts to seduce her himself, but she rebukes him. The Actress and Dale are tossed out of the car, and Dale, with his pants halfway down, lands in a large puddle.
- The next morning arrives and Kodar's totally naked character has found shelter in the second story of a house. From there, she climbs carefully out of an open window, drops to the ground, and wanders to an empty railroad car, where she finds Dale asleep on the floor. Enhanced by optical effects, more chase scenes ensue around the Metro-Goldwyn-Mayer studios back-lot (including Kodar's character going into Andy Hardy's iconic house).
- A sex scene on raw bedsprings left on the studio back-lot, while Hannaford gives Dale directions off-screen. After some awkward badgering, a naked Dale decides he's had enough and leaves the set. Hannaford watches him go and calls out through the megaphone ..."goodbye Johnny Dale." The production is now without a leading man.
- A scene—which Hannaford's manager 'The Baron' complains is presented out of sequence—in which a now-clothed John Dale walks alone around a dusty, windy studio back-lot.
- The final scene: a nude Oja Kodar attacks a giant phallic symbol with a pair of scissors. It deflates and collapses in front of her.

== Cast ==
- John Huston as J.J. "Jake" Hannaford, modelled on Ernest Hemingway. Welles denied speculation that the character was also based on himself or Huston, although he noted that there were elements of early Hollywood directors with macho reputations, such as Rex Ingram, John Ford, Raoul Walsh and William A. Wellman.
- Oja Kodar as The Actress or The Red, Red Indian, nicknamed Pocahontas by Hannaford. The unnamed, enigmatic actress features prominently in the film-within-a-film. She also attends Hannaford's party, bridging the two parts of the film. Her role is entirely silent -- both at the party and in the film-within-a-film.
- Peter Bogdanovich as Brooks Otterlake, a protégé of Hannaford's who is now a commercially successful director in his own right, and who has a talent for mimicking celebrities. The character has many parallels with Bogdanovich himself, who took over the role after the departure of comedian Rich Little. Little remained credited as a party extra.
- Susan Strasberg as Juliette Rich, a savage film critic. The character was a thinly veiled spoof of Pauline Kael, with whom Welles was in a public feud over her controversial allegation in the essay "Raising Kane" that he did not write Citizen Kane. The role had originally been written with Jeanne Moreau in mind, and was initially played by Bogdanovich's then-wife Polly Platt, who also served as the film's production designer, before eventually being taken over by Strasberg, who reshot the scenes previously filmed with Platt.
- Norman Foster as Billy Boyle, an aging former child actor from Hannaford's early films, and a member of his entourage, portrayed as a stooge. He is a recovering alcoholic, and a compulsive eater of candy, with parallels to Mickey Rooney (notwithstanding Boyle's votive guilelessness).
- Bob Random as Oscar "John" Dale, the pretty, androgynous leading man of Hannaford's new film, who walked out mid-filming, leaving the picture unfinished. Like "The Actress", Dale's performance is entirely silent.
- Lilli Palmer as Zarah Valeska, an enigmatic, retired leading lady from the 1930s who owns the ranch which hosts Hannaford's party. The character was based on Welles' old friend Marlene Dietrich, whom he very much wanted to play the role; however, Dietrich was unavailable for filming. Although she appears alongside Strasberg and members of the "Hannaford Mafia" in several scenes, all of Palmer's footage was shot in Europe.
- Edmond O'Brien as Pat Mullins, an aging actor with far right political leanings who is one of Hannaford's cronies.
- Mercedes McCambridge as Maggie Noonan, Hannaford's devoted editor.
- Cameron Mitchell as Matt "Zimmie" Zimmer, a Texas-born make-up artist of Jewish heritage and one of Hannaford's artistic collaborators. Although he is fired by Costello en route to the ranch, Hannaford later notes that he has frequently fired and rehired Zimmer during past productions. During the party, Zimmer situates an array of John Dale-inspired dummies for Hannaford to shoot at.
- Paul Stewart as Matt Costello, Hannaford's personal assistant and another member of the "Hannaford Mafia". He is reputed to have a long-standing association with the House Un-American Activities Committee.
- Gregory Sierra as Jack Simon, a macho screenwriter with parallels to John Milius, who questions Hannaford's sexual orientation in front of Otterlake.
- Tonio Selwart as The Baron, a parody of Welles' former business partner John Houseman (or his producer friend Alessandro Tasca di Cutò), from whom he had acrimoniously separated in the 1940s, and who published several memoirs throughout the 1970s that were scathing of Welles, but who is presented here as doting and devoted. He doubles as Hannaford's primary screenwriter.
- Dan Tobin as Dr. Bradley Pease Burroughs, Professor of English Literature at Clivedale Academy, a boys' boarding school in Franahan, Ohio, which had been implicated in a pederasty scandal involving another teacher. His former star pupil is John Dale. When Pease Burroughs is brought out to Hannaford's party to discuss Dale he is noticeably ill-at-ease in the unfamiliar atmosphere of Hollywood.
- John Carroll as Lou Martin, an actor who is another member of the "Hannaford Mafia".
- Stafford Repp as Al Denny, an actor who is another member of the "Hannaford Mafia".
- Geoffrey Land as Max David, a young studio boss and former child actor, spoofing Robert Evans.
- Joseph McBride as Mr. Pister, an amalgamation of various cinephiles and socially awkward film critics whom Welles had met over the years.
- Pat McMahon as Marvin P. Fassbender, a bumptious film journalist.
- Cathy Lucas as Mavis Henscher, a spoof of Bogdanovich's then-girlfriend, actress Cybill Shepherd (who was present for at least some of the filming, and whose brother, Bill Shepherd, was part of the production crew filming in Arizona). A young actress, Henscher has difficulty balancing her acting career with the correspondence course her home state makes her take while working.
- Howard K. Grossman as Charles Higgam, Hannaford's biographer, a parody of Charles Higham, who had written an influential and unflattering 1970 biography of Welles which had wounded him with its Freudian accusation that he had a "fear of completion" on films. A 1970 Higham article publicizing the biography had directly led to one major investor pulling out from The Other Side of the Wind, who was put off by the "fear of completion" charge. The role was originally played by Bogdanovich, but then re-shot with Grossman when Bogdanovich switched to playing Otterlake. Although Higgam was a more prominent character in the earlier scripts, his role is sharply reduced in the final film.
- Robert Aiken as the driver in Hannaford's film-within-a-film, who is the jealous boyfriend of the unnamed actress played by Kodar.
- Gene Clark as the projectionist at Hannaford's party.
- Peter Jason as Grover, a member of Hannaford's entourage
- Larry Jackson as Roger, an avant-garde young film-maker.
- Cassie Yates as Martine, an avant-garde young film-maker.
- Benny Rubin as Abe Vogel, based on veteran Hollywood agent Abe Lastfogel.
- William Katt as Man in Bathroom Stall, a character in Hannaford's film
- Henry Jaglom as himself.
- Paul Mazursky as himself.
- Dennis Hopper as himself.
- Curtis Harrington as himself.
- Claude Chabrol as himself.
- Stéphane Audran as herself.
- George Jessel as himself.
- Angelo Rossitto as himself.
- Richard Wilson as himself.
- Michel Duchaussoy as himself.
- Rich Little as a party guest.
- Cameron Crowe as a party guest.
- Les Moonves as a party guest.
- Todd McCarthy as a party guest.
- Cybill Shepherd as a party guest (uncredited).
- Orson Welles as the voice of a journalist (uncredited).
- Documentary filmmakers were played by Gary Graver, Frank Marshall, Mike Ferris, Eric Sherman, Felipe Herba, Paul Hunt, Bill Weaver and Mark Turnbull.

Due to the 48 years taken for the film to be completed, and the advanced age of many of the actors playing Hollywood veterans, most cast members died long before the film's 2018 release – the first two being Stafford Repp in November 1974 (while principal photography was in progress), and Norman Foster in July 1976 (only six months after filming wrapped). Both had shot all of their scenes in the first half of 1974. Other cast members who died before the film's 2018 release included Huston, Strasberg, Palmer, O'Brien, McCambridge, Mitchell, Stewart, Selwart, Tobin, Carroll, Rubin, Mazursky, Hopper, Harrington, Chabrol, Audran, Jessel, Rossitto, Wilson, and Graver. Over the years, while the film's negative remained sealed in a Paris vault, several production members expressed frustration at their inability to see the film - Tonio Selwart, for instance, was in his late 70s when he acted in it, and considered it his "swan song" from acting. In 1992, he said that he would probably never see the film, considering both his advanced age and declining eyesight. He died in 2002, aged 106, with the film still unreleased.

== Crew ==
Shot over many years in many locations, the film had many crew members, some of whom may be difficult to ascertain. The following crew list also contains the locations where they worked and any authenticating references. The crew members often were performing multiple tasks, so that defining the various roles is difficult.

- Orson Welles, director, camera operator (throughout the whole film).
- Gary Graver, director of photography, camera operator (throughout the whole film).
- Bill Weaver, camera operator (Arizona). He was the co-inventor (with Robert Steadman) of the Weaver-Steadman balanced fluid head, 2 and 3 axis camera supports widely used in Hollywood productions.
- Peter Jason, production assistant, camera assistant (Arizona). Primarily an actor in the film, but he also slated scenes for the camera department. He has over 200 acting credits on IMDb.
- Neil Canton, production assistant (Arizona). He went on to produce Back to the Future Part I, II, & III, The Witches of Eastwick, Caddyshack II, Trespass, Get Carter, Geronimo: An American Legend and others.
- Frank Marshall, unit production manager, production accountant (Arizona). Subsequently, a noted Hollywood producer.
- Rick Waltzer, production assistant, camera assistant (Arizona).
- Larry Jackson, grip (Arizona). He also acted in the film as the director of the documentary film crew following Jake Hannaford. He went on to become vice president of international acquisitions for the Samuel Goldwyn Company.
- Polly Platt, art direction (Hannaford's film, and LA car scenes). Subsequently, a Hollywood producer, production designer and screenwriter.
- Bill Shepherd, grip (Arizona)
- Ruth Hasty, post production supervisor (Hollywood), joining the production in 2014. She has post production supervisor and other credits on The Talented Mr. Ripley, Mission: Impossible, The Twilight Saga: Breaking Dawn – Part 2, Jurassic Park and many others.
- Bob Murawski, editor, joining the production in 2017. He has editor credits on The Hurt Locker, Spider-Man, Spider-Man 2, Spider-Man 3 and many others.
- Vincent Marich, costume designer (Los Angeles).

== Production history ==
=== Inception of the project, 1961–1970 ===
The film had a troubled production history. Like many of Welles' personally funded films, the project was filmed and edited on-and-off for several years.

The project evolved from an idea Welles had in 1961 after the suicide of Ernest Hemingway. Welles had known Hemingway since 1937 and was inspired to write a screenplay about an aging macho bullfight enthusiast who is fond of a young bullfighter. Nothing came of the project for a while but work on the script resumed in Spain in 1966, just after Welles had completed Chimes at Midnight. Early drafts were entitled Sacred Beasts and turned the older bullfight enthusiast into a film director. At a 1966 banquet to raise funds for the project, Welles told a group of prospective financiers:

Our story is about a pseudo-Hemingway, a movie director. So, the central figure ... you can barely see through the hair on his chest; who was frightened by Hemingway at birth. He's a tough movie director who has killed three or four extras on every picture ... [but is] full of charm. Everybody thinks he's great. In our story he's riding around following a bullfighter and living through him ... but he's become obsessed by this young man who has become ... his own dream of himself. He's been rejected by all his old friends. He's finally been shown up to be a kind of voyeur ... a fellow who lives off other people's danger and death.

=== Casting ===
The film features an exceptionally large number of film directors in acting roles, besides Huston and Bogdanovich who both occasionally acted. Other directors who performed in The Other Side of the Wind included Claude Chabrol, Norman Foster, Gary Graver, Curtis Harrington, Dennis Hopper, Henry Jaglom and Paul Mazursky, mostly playing Hannaford's entourage of journalists and young filmmakers. Other Hollywood celebrities who were friends of Welles were asked to participate, including Jack Nicholson, but either declined or were unavailable.

Impressionist Rich Little was originally cast as Brooks Otterlake, but his role was recast during production. There are differing accounts as to the reason for his departure. Welles expressed dissatisfaction with the impressionist's acting ability and stated that he fired him. Little says that he doesn't know why he lost contact with Welles part of the way through filming. Cinematographer Gary Graver tells a different story: "We shot many, many scenes with him, and he was quite good in each of them. ... One day, completely out of the blue, Rich showed up with his suitcase in his hand. 'Orson,' he said, 'I haven't seen my wife in a long time. I have to go home.' And like that, he was gone! ... Orson didn't get angry. He just sat there looking incredulous. He couldn't believe what was happening. The rapport between Orson and Rich had been a good one, so no one had expected Rich's sudden departure." Filming was completed with Bogdanovich playing Otterlake. This necessitated reshooting all of Little's scenes. Little's interpretation of the Otterlake character would have had him using a different accent or impression for every single scene – a device which Joseph McBride thought "uncomfortably labored". By contrast, although Bogdanovich did several impressions in character as Otterlake, he played most of his scenes with his own voice. Previously, Bogdanovich played cineaste Charles Higgam by doing an impression of Jerry Lewis at Welles' request.

The characters played by Foster, Selwart, Jessel, McCambridge, O'Brien, Stewart, Wilson, Mitchell, Carroll and Repp form Hannaford's entourage, representing the "Old Hollywood"; while Chabrol, Harrington, Hopper, Jaglom and Mazursky play thinly veiled versions of themselves, representing the "New Hollywood". The "Old Hollywood" characters serve as something of a chorus for Hannaford, providing various commentaries on his life. According to the shooting script, Welles intended to provide the film's short opening narration, intending to dub it in post-production. However, he never recorded it. Many of the cast and crew worked for free, or for low wages, or in exchange for favours from Welles. Huston, a close friend of Welles, worked for the nominal fee of $75,000 – some of which is still owed to his estate, after one of the film's producers embezzled part of the budget. Welles said he could not afford to pay his cinematographer Gary Graver, so instead gave him his 1941 Academy Award statuette for the script of Citizen Kane by way of thanks. McBride's salary comprised two boxes of cigars. Mazursky recalled that he was never paid for his one night of acting.

=== Production approach ===
Welles described the film's unconventional style to Peter Bogdanovich during an interview on the set:

I'm going to use several voices to tell the story. You hear conversations taped as interviews, and you see quite different scenes going on at the same time. People are writing a book about him—different books. Documentaries ... still pictures, films, tapes. All these witnesses ... The movie's going to be made up of all this raw material. You can imagine how daring the cutting can be, and how much fun.

[PB: Have you written a screenplay?]

Four of them. But most of it's got to be ad-libbed. I've worked on it for so long—years. ... If I were a nineteenth-century novelist, I'd have written a three-volume novel. I know everything that happened to that man. And his family—where he comes from—everything; more than I could ever try to put in a movie. His family—how they were competing with the Kennedys and the Kellys to get out of the lace-curtain Irish department. I love this man, and I hate him.

John Huston confirmed that the film was photographed in a highly unconventional style: "It's through these various cameras that the story is told. The changes from one to another – color, black and white, still, and moving – made for a dazzling variety of effects." He added that principal photography was highly improvised, with the script only loosely being adhered to. At one point, Welles told him, "John, just read the lines or forget them and say what you please. The idea is all that matters."

In addition to the tightly edited montage of different styles for the main film, Hannaford's film-within-the-film was photographed in an entirely different style, at a much slower pace, as a pastiche of Antonioni. Welles said at the time: "There's a film with the film, which I made [in 1970–71] with my own money. It's the old man's attempt to do a kind of counterculture film, in a surrealist, dreamlike style. We see some of it in the director's projection room, some of it at a drive-in when that breaks down. It's about 50% of the whole movie. Not the kind of film I'd want to make; I've invented a style for him."

In 1972, Welles said that filming was "96% complete" (which seems to have been an exaggeration, since many of the film's key scenes were not shot until 1973–1975 – although it was true that The Other Side of the Wind, the film-within-the-film, was complete by that stage) and in January 1976 the last scene of principal photography was completed.

=== Locations ===
Much of the party scene was filmed in 1974 on Stage 1 at Southwestern Studio in Carefree, Arizona, a suburb of Phoenix, with John Huston, Peter Bogdanovich, Susan Strasberg, Stafford Repp, Dan Tobin, Norman Foster, Cathy Lucas, Peter Jason, and others. Welles used the living room set and furniture designed for The New Dick Van Dyke Show that remained standing when the show left Southwestern Studio to return to CBS in Hollywood.

Other party scenes were shot in 1974 in a private mansion among the boulders of Carefree, not far from the studio, that was rented by Welles and used as his and other members of the company's residence during the shoot. The opposite house on the same street was used in Michelangelo Antonioni's film Zabriskie Point.

Further party scenes were shot in Bogdanovich's own Beverly Hills house, which Welles stayed in for over two years in 1974–1976, after the film's financial problems meant that the crew could no longer go on renting the Arizona studio and mansion. Parts of the scenery from the previous shoot were redeployed to the Beverly Hills house.

Other scenes were shot in Reseda (where the drive-in cinema scenes were filmed in the same location as the climax of Bogdanovich's Targets), Century City (where the skyscrapers form the backdrop of some of Hannaford's film), Connecticut, France (at Welles' house in Orvilliers), the Netherlands, England, Spain, Belgium, and the Metro-Goldwyn-Mayer back-lot in Hollywood.

The scenes shot on the M.G.M. back-lot, viewed in Hannaford's film-within-a-film, were photographed without M.G.M.'s permission. Welles was smuggled onto the back-lot in a darkened van, while the rest of the cast and crew pretended to be a group of film students visiting the studio. The crew was not confident that they would ever be able to access the back-lot again, and so filmed everything over one long, amphetamine-fuelled week-end in 1970, without sleep. The back-lot, which was seriously dilapidated, was demolished shortly afterwards, and only one more film – That's Entertainment! (1974) – was shot there before its demolition.

=== Beginning of production, 1970–71 ===
When Welles moved back to the United States in the late 1960s, the script's setting changed to Hollywood, and second-unit photography started in August 1970. Principal photography in 1970–1971 focused on Hannaford's film-within-a-film. Welles was initially unsure whom to cast as the film director and whether to play the role himself, finally settling in 1974 on his friend the actor-director John Huston. The few party scenes shot before 1974 were shot without Huston, and often contained just one side of a conversation, with Huston's side of the conversation filmed several years later and intended to be edited into the earlier footage.

=== First pause in filming, 1971–1973 ===
Filming ground to a halt late in 1971 when the U.S. government decided that Welles' European company was a holding company, not a production company, and retroactively presented him with a large tax bill. Welles had to work on numerous other projects to pay off this debt, and filming could not resume until 1973. During that time, Welles acted in a number of other projects to raise funds, and secured further financing in France, Iran and Spain. Some scenes were shot intermittently in 1973, as and when cast were available (as with Lilli Palmer's scenes, all shot in Spain without any other cast present); but the film's main production block did not begin until early 1974, when major shooting of the party happened in Arizona.

=== 1974 production block, alleged embezzlement, and second major pause in the filming ===
Filming resumed for an intensive four months of production in January to April 1974, when most of the party scenes were shot, but principal photography was undermined by serious financial problems, including embezzlement by one of the investors, who fled with much of the film's budget. Barbara Leaming described the situation in her biography of Welles, based on extensive interviews with Welles:

The first of the backers Orson managed to find in Paris was a Spanish acquaintance of his from the international film community who enthusiastically agreed to kick in $350,000, a little less than half of what Orson and Oja had already invested. Shortly thereafter an equivalent sum was pledged by a French-based Iranian group headed by Mehdi B[o]ushehri, the brother-in-law of the Shah ... Dominique Antoine, a Frenchwoman, made the deal with Orson on behalf of the Iranians ... Orson left France with the understanding that the Spanish partner would act as intermediary with the Iranians in Paris ...

But no sooner were Orson and Oja in Spain than trouble started. "We were perfectly all right as long as I was using Oja's money and mine," says Orson, "but the moment we got associates!" The Iranians appeared not to be living up to their end of the deal. Orson heard from the Spaniard who had flown in from Paris, that the Iranians had not given him the money they had promised. There were heavy rains and flooding in Spain, so Orson and Oja were basically cooped up in their hotel, where they worked on a new script together. The Spaniard returned to Paris to try again. "In a minute they're going to have it," he told Orson later. "It looks all right." In lieu of the Iranian funds, he gave them very small sums of money, which he said were part of the investment he had agreed to make. Not until afterward did Orson discover that the Iranians had indeed been giving the Spaniard the promised money, which had come from Iran in cash, and that, instead of bringing it to Spain, the sly fellow was pocketing it. Says Orson: "We just sat, month after month, while he went to Paris, received the money, and came back and told us that they wouldn't give him any money. He was very convincing to us, and very convincing with them in Paris. He kept flying back and forth extracting money from them. We didn't know them, you see. We knew him." The small sums of money he had been giving Orson as if from his own pocket actually came out of the Iranian funds. His constant reassurance to Orson that the Iranians were about to come through was calculated to keep Orson in Spain out of contact with them. On his part, Orson did not want to interfere in what he presumed were his emissary's delicate negotiations with them. It simply never occurred to him that the fellow was lying—and had never any money of his own to invest in the first place...

Meanwhile, due to foul weather, Orson had decided to abandon Spain for Arizona, where John Huston and a host of other faithfuls joined him. ... The swindler continued his game of collecting cash from the Iranians who, having heard only from him, still did not know that anything was wrong. When they received a telex purportedly from John Huston's agent to ask for a $60,000 advance, Dominique Antoine did ask for further verification. But this did not deter the swindler, who sent her a Screen Actor's Guild form with a bogus Social Security number and signature from the States. The Iranians dispatched the $60,000, which was pocketed by the Spaniard rather than Huston, who, out of friendship for Orson, was actually working for much less. After having sent the money, Dominique Antoine had second thoughts about it. Until now she had deliberately left Orson alone because she sensed he preferred it that way. But now something told her there was a problem. "I think I have to go there," she told Boushehri, "even if Orson isn't pleased." Since Orson had yet to receive a penny from the Iranians, their French representative was the last person he expected to see in the Arizona desert. He could not have been happy to see her. When almost instantly he asked her where the money was, she nervously told him that she had been making regular payments to the intermediary, who obviously hadn't passed them on to him, he broke down.

The film's producer Dominique Antoine subsequently endorsed the above account from Barbara Leaming as being "entirely accurate". A July 1986 article in American Cinematographer also corroborates this story, describing Antoine's arrival in Arizona on the set at Southwestern Studios late at night. Welles himself told interviewer Tom Snyder in 1975: "I got a backer, and we shot a couple of weeks, and then that backer ran away with my money as well as his." This story is further corroborated by Peter Bogdanovich, who wrote in November 1997 of the production, "another producer ran back to Europe with $250,000 of Orson's money and never was heard from again (although I recently saw the person on TV accepting an Oscar for coproducing the Best Foreign Film of the year)". In 2008, film scholars Jean-Pierre Berthomé and François Thomas identified Spanish producer Andrés Vicente Gómez (who collected a Best Foreign Picture Oscar in 1994) as the alleged embezzler, and they date his withdrawal from the project to 1974. Gómez first met Welles in Spain in 1972, during the making of Treasure Island, in which they were both involved. Gómez then negotiated Welles' deal with the Iranian-owned, Paris-based Les Films de l'Astrophore, the first product of which was the 1973 film F for Fake, followed by The Other Side of the Wind. As well as the accusation of embezzlement, Welles also had this to say of Gómez: "My Spanish producer never paid my hotel bill for the three months that he kept me waiting in Madrid for the money for The Other Side of the Wind. So I'm scared to death to be in Madrid. I know they're going to come after me with that bill."

Gómez responded to these accusations in a 2001 memoir, subsequently reproduced on his company website:

Regarding the end of my relationship with Orson Welles some lies were told, although he assured me they did not come from him. Accordingly, I don't want to go into that matter. I don't deem it relevant to mention the details of our split considering that our relationship was always polite and amicable and we had wonderful moments and experiences together. However, I must make it clear that if I abandoned the project, I didn't do so for financial reasons. My agreement with Welles, written and signed by him, envisaged my work as a producer, not an investor. ... Certain people who were close to Welles and part of his inner circle – the same ones who are spoiling his works and making a living from them – tried to justify his difficulties by linking them to the fact that I pulled out. They have even gone so far as to say that I had pocketed some of the Iranian money which in fact never existed, beyond the funds that were spent appropriately.

Gómez was later interviewed for They'll Love Me When I'm Dead, a 2018 documentary on the making of the film, in which he said, "I read he blamed me because of the finance fiasco, which is totally untrue. I made a settlement with him, there was no complaint, there was no anything. If it was true, why didn't they make any claim from me, you know?"

=== Further attempts to raise funds and complete the film, 1975–76 ===
With the film's mounting financial problems after the March 1974 disappearance of Gómez and the simultaneous disappearance of many of the film's funds, Welles had to abandon the Arizona shoot in April 1974 before he could complete all principal photography. In particular, although he had shot seven weeks of footage with Rich Little in one of the lead roles, the re-casting of Peter Bogdanovich in the role meant that many of the film's key scenes had to be re-shot. Accordingly, in 1974 Welles moved into Bogdanovich's Beverly Hills mansion, where he lived on and off for the next few years, and where he intermittently shot more party scenes, until principal photography finally wrapped in January 1976.

In February 1975, Welles was awarded an AFI Lifetime Achievement Award, and used the star-studded ceremony as an opportunity to pitch for funding to complete the film. (With a touch of irony, one of the scenes he showed his audience featured Boyle screening a rough cut of Hannaford's latest film to a studio boss, in a bid for "end money" to complete his picture.) Sure enough, one producer made what Welles later called a "wonderful offer", but Antoine turned it down on the assumption that an even better offer would arrive. No such offer came, and Welles later bitterly regretted the refusal, commenting before his death that if he had accepted it "the picture would have been finished now and released".

Welles estimated that the editing of the film in a distinctive and experimental style would take approximately one year of full-time work (which was how long he had spent on the experimental, rapidly cut editing of his previous completed film, F for Fake – like F for Fake, the film would have averaged approximately one edit per second, and would have lasted around half an hour longer). On F for Fake, Welles had used three separate moviolas, arranged side by side, to simultaneously edit the film. He would perform the cuts to the negative himself, then leave an editing assistant at each moviola to complete the edit while he moved to the next moviola to begin the next edit. The Other Side of the Wind necessitated even more complicated editing, and Welles lined up five moviolas in a semi-circle around a table, with a staff of assistants to help him.

A change of management at the Iranian production company in 1975 resulted in tensions between Welles and the backers. The new management saw Welles as a liability, and refused to pay him to edit the film. The company made several attempts to reduce Welles' share of the film profits from 50% to 20%, and crucially, attempted to remove his artistic control over the film's final cut. Welles made numerous attempts to seek further financial backing to pay him to complete the editing full-time, including attempting to interest a Canadian backer, but no such funding materialised, and so Welles only edited the film piecemeal in his spare time over the next decade, between other acting assignments which the heavily indebted actor-director needed to support himself.

=== Production dates ===
The following dates are provided by Jonathan Rosenbaum's chronology of Welles' career:

- August 17, 1970: Tests begin shooting, Los Angeles.
- August 30, 1970: Principal photography begins, Los Angeles. (Film-within-a-film scenes.)
- September – late December 1970: Shooting & editing continues in Los Angeles, including on the M.G.M. back-lot, Century City. (Film-within-a-film scenes, and car scenes.)
- 1971: Four months of filming in Carefree, Arizona, then later in Beverly Hills. (Party scenes)
- Late 1971/1972: Break in filming due to Welles' recurring tax problems after a fresh I.R.S. audit. Welles turns to raise money by working on other projects, including F for Fake, which is made for Iranian-French production house Les Films de l'Astrophore, with Iranian money provided by Mehdi Boushehri and the participation of French producer Dominique Antoine. For the completion of The Other Side of the Wind, Welles secures funding through a three-way deal, with a third of funds raised by himself, a third from Boushehri through Les Films de l'Astrophore, and a third from Spanish producer Andrés Vicente Gómez.
- Early 1973: Welles and Kodar are stranded by flooding in Madrid for three months, while negotiating with Gómez for funding. They eventually relocate to Paris.
- June – mid-September 1973: Filming in Orvilliers and Paris. (Party scenes.)
- January–April 1974: John Huston is cast in the leading role, which has been vacant up until now. Party scenes are filmed at Southwestern Studio and a private mansion in Carefree, Arizona. Susan Strasberg also joins the cast in Carefree.
- Sometime in 1974, circa March: Producer Andrés Vicente Gómez leaves the project after allegedly embezzling $250,000 of its budget, and having failed to contribute his promised third of the budget. Eventually, most of the outstanding budget is put forward by Mehdi Boushehri through Les Films de l'Astrophore, leading to legal disputes over whether they owned 33%, 50%, 67% or 80% of the final film. Welles also pours more of his own money into the film, including money borrowed from friends; Peter Bogdanovich puts $500,000 in the film.
- August 1974: Filming in Orvilliers. (Car scene.)
- November–December 1974: Editing in Paris and Rome.
- February–June 1975: Filming at Peter Bogdanovich's house in Beverly Hills. (Party scenes.)
- September 1975 – January 1976: Editing in Beverly Hills.
- January 1976: Principal photography completed.

=== Missing elements ===
Welles filmed 96 hours of raw footage (45 hours for the party scenes, and 51 hours for the film-within-a-film), including multiple takes of the same scenes, reshoots with different cast members (e.g. Peter Bogdanovich substituting for Rich Little) but did not complete the following elements:

- Welles never recorded the opening narration. Bogdanovich, in character as Otterlake, recorded a slightly amended narration for the final film.
- With 40–45 minutes of film edited by Welles, approximately 75–80 minutes still required editing.
- The film lacked a musical score, although Welles had indicated that he wanted a jazz score.
- Two shots had never been filmed: the dummies exploding after being shot, and the final shot of the last car leaving the drive-in theatre. The first was provided with the help of CGI, as dummies shot against a green screen were blended in with manipulated footage of rocks; the second was provided through use of stock footage of a drive-in theatre, with Hannaford's film digitally inserted onto the screen.
- Among the 96 hours of footage, it was found that the original quad sound tapes for many of the 1974 recording sessions were missing. This had to be provided through a combination of digitally cleaned-up second- or third-generation sound sources (e.g. on Welles' workprint material), or through modern actors dubbing, in some cases just dubbing individual words or syllables to salvage line recordings that were otherwise retrieved from the workprint.

=== Legal difficulties, and efforts to complete the film ===
==== 1979–1997 ====
By 1979, forty minutes of the film had been edited by Welles. But in that year, the film experienced serious legal and financial complications. Welles' use of funds from Mehdi Boushehri, the brother-in-law of the Shah of Iran, became troublesome after the Shah was overthrown. A complex, decades-long legal battle over the ownership of the film ensued, with the original negative remaining in a vault in Paris. At first, the revolutionary government of Ayatollah Khomeini had the film impounded along with all assets of the previous regime. When they deemed the negative worthless, there was extensive litigation as to the ownership of the film. By 1998, many of the legal matters had been resolved and the Showtime cable network had guaranteed "end money" to complete the film.

However, continuing legal complications in the Welles estate and a lawsuit by Welles' daughter, Beatrice Welles, caused the project to be suspended. When Welles died in 1985 he had left many of his assets to his estranged widow Paola Mori, and after her own death in 1986, these were inherited by their daughter, Beatrice Welles. However, he had also left various other assets, from his house in Los Angeles to the full ownership and artistic control of all his unfinished film projects, to his long-time companion, mistress and collaborator Oja Kodar, who co-wrote and co-starred in The Other Side of the Wind. Since 1992, Beatrice Welles has claimed in various courts that under California law, she had ownership of all of Orson Welles' completed and incomplete pictures (including those which he did not own the rights of himself in his own life), and The Other Side of the Wind has been heavily affected by this litigation. The Guardian described how she "stifled an attempt by American cable company Showtime and Oja Kodar (Welles's partner in the latter part of his life) to complete The Other Side of the Wind", while The Daily Telegraph stated that Beatrice Welles had "blocked" the film. Matters have been exacerbated by much personal animosity between Oja Kodar and Beatrice Welles – Beatrice blames Kodar for causing the break-up of her parents' marriage, while Kodar blames Beatrice for attempting to block the screening or re-release of a number of her father's works, including Citizen Kane, Othello, Touch of Evil, Chimes at Midnight and Filming Othello. (The latter claim has been supported by film critic Jonathan Rosenbaum, who has accused Beatrice of being solely motivated by profit in claiming royalties from these films, then settling out of court as studios have been keen to avoid costly legal battles.) A clause of Welles' will, specifying that anybody who challenges any part of Kodar's inheritance will be automatically disinherited, remains unenforced – Kodar sought to have it enforced in the 1990s, but could not afford the legal fees as the case dragged on.

Although the original negative of the film long remained in a Paris vault, two workprint versions of much of the raw footage were privately held – one by Welles' cinematographer Gary Graver, who shot the film, and one by Welles himself, who covertly smuggled a copy out of Paris after the legal difficulties started. Welles left his own workprint copy to Kodar, as part of the clause of his will giving her all his unfinished film materials. (Kodar can be seen visiting a storeroom containing these materials in the Orson Welles: One Man Band documentary.)

Over the years, there were repeated attempts to clear the remaining legal obstacles to the film's completion, and to obtain the necessary finance. Those most closely involved in these efforts were Gary Graver (the film's cinematographer), Oja Kodar (as Welles' partner, co-writer and co-star of the film, and director of one of its sequences, as well as the copyright holder of Welles' unfinished work), director Peter Bogdanovich (a co-star and investor, although he only wants the return of his $500,000 rather than any share of profits), film critic Joseph McBride (who has a supporting role in the film), and Hollywood producer Frank Marshall, one of whose first jobs in the film business was as production manager on the film. Marshall in particular was instrumental in getting several major studios in the late 1990s to watch a rough cut, although most were put off by the film's legal issues.

Before a deal was put together in 1998, Oja Kodar screened Gary Graver's rough cut of the film for a number of famous directors in the 1980s and 1990s, seeking their help in completing the film, but they all turned it down for various reasons. These included John Huston (who was by then terminally ill with emphysema and was unable to breathe without oxygen tubes), Steven Spielberg, Oliver Stone, Clint Eastwood and George Lucas. Lucas reportedly claimed to be baffled by the footage, saying he did not know what to do with it, and that it was too avant-garde for a commercial audience. Kodar subsequently accused both Eastwood and Stone of plagiarism from the film, citing Eastwood's performance in White Hunter Black Heart (1990) as a copy of John Huston's, including one line of dialogue ("I'm Marvin P. Fassbender." "Of course you are."), and Stone's adoption of the film's distinctive rapidly cut editing and camera style for his JFK (1991), Nixon (1995) and Natural Born Killers (1994).

==== 1998–2013 ====
A turning point came in 1998, when Mehdi Boushehri changed his mind, and was convinced by the film's surviving makers that his best hope of recouping his money was to see the film released. He therefore compromised on his earlier claims to owning two thirds of the film, and reduced the share he claimed. This resolved several of the film's legal problems. Boushehri died in 2006, but his heirs similarly accepted that the best hope of any return on Boushehri's investment was for the film to finally be released. The 1998 deal struck with Boushehri led to funding being put up by the Showtime network, until the lawsuit from Beatrice Welles later that year stalled matters once more.

In 2004 Oja Kodar engaged film producer and family friend Trevor Chowning to confer with all parties who maintained a legal interest in the film, to include Dennis Hopper, Angelica Huston (representing her father John Huston), Peter Bogdanavich, and Mehdi Boushehri among others, in an effort to revitalize the project and complete the film. Chowning secured the agreements and also found an interested production partner in the administrators of the Harold Lloyd estate. They offered to utilize Welles' edit to the extent that it was known, and work with the family's representatives, to complete the film as Welles had envisioned. Complicating legal stipulations eventually caused this deal to stall.

Peter Bogdanovich announced in 2004 that he planned to restore the film and release it soon thereafter. He cited a conversation before Welles' death in which "Orson said to me, 'If anything happens to me, you will make sure you finish it, won't you?' It was, of course, a compliment and also a terrible moment. He pressed me to give some assurance." However, there remained both legal challenges, and technical challenges over replicating Welles' avant-garde editing style.

In 2006, Oja Kodar expressed concerns about a proposed deal Beatrice Welles had made with Showtime to turn the film into a "kind of" documentary, with the intention of never allowing it to be released as a completed theatrical film. A new deal was then eventually struck in 2007, in which the three parties previously involved (Oja Kodar as the heir of Welles' unfinished work, Mehdi Boushehri's heirs, and the Showtime Network) agreed to pay off Beatrice Welles with an undisclosed sum and/or share of profits from the film. At a March 29, 2007, appearance at the Florida Film Festival, Bogdanovich, in response to a question about the status of the film, stated that the four parties involved had come to an agreement earlier that week and that the film would be edited and released in the very near future. Bogdanovich also stated in an April 2, 2007, press report that a deal to complete the film was "99.9% finished", with a theatrical release planned for late 2008.

There were then further complications in 2007, through the intervention of Paul Hunt. He had worked on the film in the 1970s as a line producer, an assistant editor, assistant camera operator and gaffer, and was described by Gary Graver's son as "the strangest, weirdest guy you've ever met". Kodar had approached him to see if he could broker a deal, guiding him as to who controlled the rights and suggesting what kind of deal they would accept. Together with his producing partner Sanford Horowitz, Hunt formed a company, Horowitz Hunt LLC, and within three months had a signed deal with Mehdi Boushehri, with an option to acquire his rights of the movie. On August 6, 2007, Horowitz Hunt LLC filed with the US Copyright office Mehdi Boushehri's signed agreement to transfer the rights to the movie. Horowitz and Hunt's goal was to release two versions of The Other Side of the Wind: a completed theatrical version and another uncompleted but original 42-minute version, reflecting Welles' workprint at the time of his death.

In March 2008, Bogdanovich said that there was over a year's worth of work left to be done, and a month later, he filmed the opening of the Los Angeles vault where Oja Kodar had kept the workprint material cut by Welles, along with other positive film materials. However, the full original negative remained sealed in a warehouse in France. Throughout the rest of 2008, some work was done on the Los Angeles material. In June 2008, the Showtime Network set up an editing suite in Los Angeles, to begin preliminary logging in work on all of the material. Bogdanovich personally directed the work, Tim King was the Showtime Executive in charge of post-production, Sasha Welles (a nephew of Oja Kodar) worked on the production as an assistant editor, and internships were advertised for people to work on cataloguing the film materials.

Horowitz Hunt LLC eventually began negotiations with Oja Kodar to acquire her rights, but they were unsuccessful in coming to terms with Kodar, when Beatrice Welles put an injunction on access to the negative stored at the LTC Film Vault in Paris, by proclaiming an inheritance claim, thus preventing the opening of the Paris vault containing the full 96 hours of original negatives, some of which had not even been seen by Welles in his lifetime. The attorney for Boushehri neglected to send in their documentation nullifying Beatrice's claim and thus the project stalled once again. This resulted in the closure of the Showtime editing suite in December 2008, and Showtime eventually put the project on hold.

An article in Variety in February 2009 stated that Showtime was still willing to pay for its completion, but they wanted to be sure all the materials existed. The negative still resided in a vault in Paris, unseen since the 1970s, but permission from all the estates had to be obtained before access to the negative could be granted. Bogdanovich stated, "It's going to happen in the next month or so. We're aiming for Cannes [in 2010]. Everybody wants it to happen. It's film history. It will be something for it to finally be seen after all these years."

In January 2010, during a public Q&A after a screening of one of his films in Columbus, Ohio, Bogdanovich stated that the film had been examined and was in good condition, but "Orson left such a mess with who owned what", and wondered whether editing the film would even be possible. Bogdanovich indicated that the original negative was in excellent condition, with the picture quality being far superior to the poor-quality workprints seen in public so far. In 2012, he went on to say that he had examined the material himself, and told Canada's Toro magazine:

We've looked at the footage and it's great. I cut two scenes together that hadn't been finished. There are a few scenes that Orson already cut together and then for the scenes that I cut, he had picked takes but just hadn't assembled them. So we just used his takes and I could tell what he had in mind. It's very different than anything else he made and quite strange. I don't think any of us will know what it is until it's done. I don't know when it will come out, but I think one day it will.

A report in The Guardian in January 2011, suggested, once again, that a legal settlement was close and that a release would be possible in the near future. However, Oja Kodar denied that this was the case.

Paul Hunt died in 2011. That same year, Sanford Horowitz and financier John Nicholas launched a company called "Project Welles The Other Side LLC" and the website www.projectwelles.com to attract additional capital and complete negotiations with Kodar and Beatrice Welles. Their goal was to present an uncluttered account of events, make peace with all the players, present their chain of title compiled by the law firm of Mitchell, Silberberg & Knuff and gain access to the film negatives stored in the LTC Film vault in Paris.

By 2011, all copyright difficulties had theoretically been resolved between the respective parties. However, the Showtime network, which had previously pledged to provide funding for the project, refused to specify what the budget would be. Oja Kodar stated that she did not want a repeat of the debacle over Welles' posthumously completed Don Quixote, which was universally panned after being cheaply put together from badly decayed, incomplete footage which was sloppily edited, badly dubbed, and often incoherent. As such, she would not grant permission to proceed until she had received assurances that the project would be done professionally, and to a high standard, with an adequate budget.

In March 2012, Matthew Duda, the Showtime executive who had championed funding for The Other Side of the Wind since 1998, retired, and this spelled the end of Showtime's involvement in the project. After his retirement, Duda contended that the greatest obstacle to the film's completion had been Oja Kodar. "Her price kept changing," Duda said. "She kept getting higher and higher, and then she said we'd sabotaged her [nonexistent offer for more money]." Josh Karp, in his history of the film, concurred:

After retiring, Duda remained interested in the project but came to accept what he'd known all along. Oja had been the party everyone thought was essential to getting the project done. But throughout the years, she'd tried repeatedly to squeeze every bit of leverage she could out of potential investors and then would get cold feet when a deal was close, always believing something better was just around the bend. Though there had been roadblocks with Beatrice, Boushehri, Hunt, and the innumerable factors that seemed to curse the deal, it seemed that Oja had been the biggest obstacle of all preventing the completion of The Other Side of the Wind.

==== 2014–2018 completion of the film ====
With the withdrawal of Showtime, producer Filip Jan Rymsza intervened in what would ultimately be a successful bid that would break the film's deadlock. Rymsza owned the Los Angeles-based production company Royal Road Entertainment, and had become aware of the film's existence in 2009, being increasingly motivated to try and engineer its release. Very early on, he teamed up with both German producer Jens Koethner Kaul (who had already tried approaching Kodar in negotiations), and Frank Marshall.

On October 28, 2014, Royal Road Entertainment announced that it had negotiated an agreement, with the assistance of Marshall, and would purchase the rights to complete and release The Other Side of the Wind. Bogdanovich and Marshall would oversee completion of the film in Los Angeles, aiming to have it ready for screening by May 6, 2015 – the 100th anniversary of Welles' birth. Royal Road Entertainment and German producer Jens Koethner Kaul acquired the rights held by Les Films de l'Astrophore and the late Mehdi Boushehri. They reached an agreement with Oja Kodar, who inherited Welles' ownership of the film, and Beatrice Welles, manager of the Welles estate.

On May 1, 2015, it was disclosed that the film was far from completed. Post-production was to be funded by pre-selling distribution rights, but in December some potential distributors asked to see edited footage from the negative, not the worn workprint. "People want to help us, but they have a business decision to make", producer Frank Marshall told The New York Times. "They would first like to see an edited sequence, and I think that is a fair request."

A 40-day crowdfunding drive was launched May 7, 2015, on the Indiegogo website, with a goal of raising $2 million for digital scanning and editing. Plans were announced for the 1,083 reels of pristine negative footage to be flown from Paris to Los Angeles for 4K resolution scanning and editing by Affonso Gonçalves. Producers hoped to complete The Other Side of the Wind in 2015, the 100th anniversary of Welles' birth, but no specific release date was identified. Noting that completion of the film should not be driven by a deadline, Marshall said, "We still think we will make it this year."

The Indiegogo campaign deadline was extended in June and the goal revised to $1,000,000 after potential outside investors offered to match that amount. Acknowledging that the campaign had struggled, Marshall said that his objective was to put the first 15 to 20 minutes of the film together to win over a distributor who will help finish the post-production. "They don't trust the fact that he was this genius and the guy that made Citizen Kane, Touch of Evil and The Magnificent Ambersons, and there might be this fantastic movie in there", Marshall said. The campaign closed on July 5, 2015, having raised $406,405. At the end of 2015, efforts to complete the film were at an impasse.

On April 5, 2016, Wellesnet announced that Netflix had been negotiating for months on a two-picture deal worth $5 million for the completion of The Other Side of the Wind and a companion documentary. The potential deal requested the approval of Oja Kodar to finalize the agreement. In mid-March 2017, it was confirmed Netflix would distribute the film.

In March 2017, the original negative, alongside dailies and other footage, arrived in Los Angeles, allowing the film's post-production work to resume. Later, the negatives were scanned in the offices of Technicolor in Hollywood.

In November 2017, it was reported that various members had been hired to the post-production team, including Bob Murawski as editor, Scott Millan as sound mixer, and Mo Henry as negative cutter. The Herculean efforts to edit the 16mm and 35mm footage, match the workprint materials to the original negative and undertake much-needed ADR and sound restoration is detailed in the documentary short A Final Cut for Orson.

In January 2018, a rough cut of the film was screened for a small, select group of invite-only attendees. Amongst those present were producer Filip Jan Rymsza, directors Paul Thomas Anderson, Quentin Tarantino and Rian Johnson; actors Danny Huston (son of the film's star, John Huston) and Crispin Glover; and The Other Side of the Wind cast and crew members Peter Bogdanovich, Lou Race, Neil Canton, and Peter Jason.

In March 2018, Michel Legrand (who had previously composed the score for Welles' 1973 film F for Fake) was announced as providing the score to the film. He had been secretly working on the film since December 2017. Orchestral recording began on March 19, 2018, in Belgium, and continued with a jazz ensemble later that week in Paris, although Legrand could not be present for the recording sessions, having been hospitalised with pneumonia at the time. Speaking of his work on the project, Legrand stated:

I asked myself constantly, "How would Orson have reacted?" The very subject of the film touched me: the idea of the passage of time, the renewal of inspiration. I am proud to be the link between these two Welles films. I take it as a gift from Orson, through the clouds.

== Release and reception ==
The film had its world premiere at the 75th Venice International Film Festival on August 31, 2018. It was also screened at the Telluride Film Festival in Colorado on September 1, 2018 and the New York Film Festival on September 29, 2018. It was released to select theaters and debuted on Netflix on November 2, 2018.

=== Reception ===
==== Before release ====
As a member of the cast, film historian Joseph McBride saw the rushes, and later saw a two-hour rough cut assembled by Gary Graver in the late 1990s to attract potential investors. McBride wrote that the film "serves as both a time capsule of a pivotal moment in film history – an 'instant' piece of period nostalgia set in the early seventies – and a meditation on changing political, sexual and artistic attitudes in the United States during that period." However, he differentiated the bulk of the film – which he praised very highly – from the footage of Hannaford's film-within-a-film:

I found that while the languid visual style of the film-within-the-film interludes would give the audience ample time to recover from the frenetic pacing of the party scenes, a more serious obstacle to the film's playability is the largely undramatic nature of much of the material putatively shot by Hannaford. Little or nothing happens in these sequences except for Oja mysteriously wandering seminude around picturesque locales and Bob Random doggedly roaring his motorcycle through expressionistically lit landscapes. The footage is beautifully shot, and there is some stunning photographic magic, such as a sequence filmed among the skyscrapers of Century City with the two characters' images vanishing into ten mirrors arranged invisibly among the stone steps and glass columns of the coldly geometrical modern office buildings ... However, in the rough cut assembled by Graver to show potential investors, the film-within-the-film sequences not only interrupt the narrative but also go on at such length that they lose their satirical point, becoming exasperating examples of what Welles was trying to spoof.

Film critic and historian Jonathan Rosenbaum saw most of the film, either in rushes, or in scenes cut by Welles, and praised its reflections on "late-60s media, not to mention its kamikaze style", and has contrasted this with the opinion of David Thomson, who had not seen the film, and who wrote in his highly critical biography of Welles, "One day, it may be freed. I hope not. The Other Side of the Wind should stay beyond reach." John Huston described a private screening in which Orson Welles showed the unfinished film to some friends: "I didn't get to see it, but those who did tell me it is a knockout."

Andrés Vicente Gómez, who was originally involved in the film's production, was quoted in the press stating his opposition to the film ever being completed; he believed it would be an "act of betrayal". His argument was that the film was always unlikely to be finished because Welles' "physical condition was delicate. He didn't have the energy to cut it." However, as Gómez was accused by Orson Welles, Dominique Antoine, Peter Bogdanovich, Mehdi Boushehri and others of embezzling $250,000 of the film's budget and absconding with the proceeds, he had a strong motive for wanting the film to not reach wider public attention. Additionally, Gómez's links to the film were severed in 1974; but filming was not finished until 1976, when most of the editing started.

Rian Johnson told Vanity Fair in April 2018 he had seen a 117-minute edit – minus its Michel Legrand score – twice, including a screening in Santa Monica, California, on January 16, 2018, with Quentin Tarantino, Alexander Payne and other VIPs, who "were all gobsmacked".

==== After release ====
On the review aggregator Rotten Tomatoes, the film holds an approval rating of 82%, based on 97 reviews with an average rating of 7.4/10. The website's critic consensus reads: "A satisfying must-watch for diehard cineastes, The Other Side of the Wind offers the opportunity to witness a long-lost chapter in a brilliant filmmaker's career." Metacritic gives the film a weighted average score of 78 out of 100, based on 32 critics, indicating "generally favorable reviews".

Film critic and author of Orson Welles in Italy Alberto Anile, who watched the film at its premiere during the 75th Venice International Film Festival, called it "one of Welles's major works". Film historian and actor in the film Joseph McBride confessed: "The final result exceeds even my high expectations."

The film was included on dozens of Best Films of 2018 lists, including Sight & Sound, Film Comment, The Hollywood Reporter, The Los Angeles Times and Vanity Fair. It received awards from the National Board of Review, National Society of Film Critics, Los Angeles Film Critics Association, San Francisco Film Critics Circle and others.

In 2020, Rymsza and Murawski assembled Hopper / Welles, a 129-minute film composed of largely unseen outtakes from The Other Side of the Wind shot in November 1970 in Los Angeles. The film is a conversation between Welles and Dennis Hopper on politics, religion and film-making.

== Bibliography ==
The film is covered in depth in the following books and articles:

- Andrés Vicente Gómez, El Sueño Loco [A Crazy Dream] (Ayuntamiento de Malaga, Malaga, 2001), 430 pp. (Written in Spanish; the English translation of a portion of Gómez's autobiography was subsequently made available online on Gómez's company website in 2013).
- Giorgio Gosetti (ed.), [Orson Welles and Oja Kodar], The Other Side of the Wind: scénario-screenplay (Cahiers du Cinéma & Festival International du Film de Locarno, Switzerland, 2005) 221pp.
- John Huston, An Open Book (Alfred A. Knopf, New York, 1980), 448pp.
- Clinton Heylin, Despite the System: Orson Welles Versus the Hollywood Studios (Canongate, Edinburgh, 2005), 402pp.
- Josh Karp, Orson Welles's Last Movie: The Making of The Other Side of the Wind (St. Martin's Press, New York, 2015), 352 pp.
- Barbara Leaming, Orson Welles: a biography (New York: Viking, 1985), 562 pp.
- Joseph McBride, Orson Welles (Boston: Da Capo Press, 1972 [rev. 1996 edn]), 245 pp.
- Joseph McBride, Whatever Happened to Orson Welles? A portrait of an independent career (University Press of Kentucky, Kentucky, 2006) 344 pp.
- Mercedes McCambridge, The Quality of Mercy: An Autobiography (New York: Times Books, 1981), 245 pp.
- Andrew J. Rausch (ed.), Gary Graver, Making Movies with Orson Welles: a memoir (Scarecrow Press, University of Michigan, 2008), 191 pp.
- Jonathan Rosenbaum (ed.), Peter Bogdanovich and Orson Welles, This is Orson Welles (DaCapo Press, New York, 1992 [rev. 1998 ed.]), 550 pp.
- Massimiliano Studer, "Orson Welles e la New Hollywood. Il caso di The Other Side of the Wind" (Mimesis, Milano-Udine, 2021), 198 pp.
- Michael Yates, Shoot 'Em Dead: Orson Welles & The Other Side of the Wind (Lulu, Morrisville, North Carolina, 2020), 260 pp.

== Documentaries ==
- Graver, Gary, Working with Orson Welles, 1993.
- Sedlar, Dominik and Sedlar, Jakov, Searching for Orson, 2006.
- Suffern, Ryan, A Final Cut for Orson: 40 Years in the Making, 2018.
- Neville, Morgan, They'll Love Me When I'm Dead, 2018.

== See also ==
- List of films with longest production time
