= Mo Henry =

American film negative cutter (1956–2024)

- Publicity photo of Mo Henry
- Born: Maureen Henry; April 19, 1956
- Died: January 14, 2024 (aged 67); Los Angeles, California, U.S.
- Occupation: Film negative cutter
- Years active: 1975–2023
- Children: 1

Maureen Ann Henry (April 19, 1956 – January 14, 2024) was an American film negative cutter whose works included Jaws, Apocalypse Now Redux, L.A. Confidential, and The Big Lebowski.

== Career ==
Henry was a fourth-generation descendant from a family of negative film cutters. During the 1920s, Henry's paternal aunt emigrated from Ireland where she first worked at Deluxe Laboratories, which was later acquired by 20th Century Fox. She passed on her knowledge of the trade to Henry's father Mike and his brothers. Mike Henry, who had served as Metro-Goldwyn-Mayer's chief negative cutter, would in turn teach his daughter. After Mo had graduated from high school, Henry's father had heard that Universal Studios was looking for union negative cutters as none were available. He recommended his daughter for the job, and the first feature film she worked on was Steven Spielberg's blockbuster Jaws in 1975. She later worked at several television studios including Quinn Martin Productions on a number of episodic television shows throughout the 1970s, including The Waltons, Eight Is Enough, Cagney & Lacey and M*A*S*H.

By the 1980s, having always wanted to be an interior designer, Henry decided to become a real estate agent in Beverly Hills, California. "I loved houses and designs and thought real estate would put me in all these great houses," Henry stated. She soon returned to Hollywood, only this time serving as a production assistant for a commercial production company. She worked her way up to production coordinator but had to quit when she became pregnant with her son. Eventually, her cousin invited her back to resume working at Universal Studios' negative cutting department. Before long, she was contacted by fellow negative cutter Donah Bassett, in which she joined her firm D. Bassett & Associates. In 1992, she became the owner of D. Bassett & Associates; from there, she began working more closely with filmmakers and getting more involved in the movies she was cutting.

In 2018, she was interviewed about her work on Orson Welles's final film, The Other Side of the Wind, in the documentary short A Final Cut for Orson.

== Death ==
Henry died of complications from liver failure in Los Angeles, on January 14, 2024, at the age of 67.
