= Alastair Mackenzie =

British actor

- Born: 8 February 1970 (age 56); Trinafour, Scotland
- Spouse: Susan Vidler
- Children: 2
- Relatives: David Mackenzie (brother)

Alastair John Mackenzie (born 8 February 1970) is a Scottish actor and writer.

== Early life ==
Alastair Mackenzie was born in Trinafour, near Perth, and educated at Westbourne House School and Glenalmond College in Perthshire. He left home at the age of 18 and moved to London.

== Career ==
Mackenzie played the young laird Archie MacDonald in the BBC drama Monarch of the Glen, and he guest starred as Richard Loughty in series three of the BBC crime drama Granite Harbour.

== Personal life ==
He lives in Islington with his partner, Scottish actress Susan Vidler, with whom he has two children: a daughter, Martha, born in December 1999 and a son, Freddie, born in September 2004.

His brother is director David Mackenzie, with whom he co-founded Sigma Films.

== Filmography ==
=== Film ===
Year	Title	Role	Notes
1994	Dragonworld	John McGowan	Direct-to-video
1995	Mouth to Mouth	Oswaldo	Original title: Boca a boca
1997	California Sunshine	Andy	Short film
1998	Horsehair	Mick	Short film
2002	The Last Great Wilderness	Charlie	Also co-writer of screenplay
2002	One Minute	Energyman	Short film
2004	A Life in the Day	Narrator	Short film
2005	Snuff-Movie	Justin / Andy / Freddy / Peter	
2008	The Edge of Love	Anthony Devas	
2008	New Town Killers	Jamie Stewart	
2010	Monster Mutt	Monty	
2011	Perfect Sense	Virologist	
2011	You Instead	Mark	
2012	Candle to Water	Vaughn	
2013	Company of Heroes	Chambliss	Direct-to-video
2013	10ml I.V.	Doc	Short film
2015	Redistributors	Michael Manning	
2016	Terminally Happy	Louis	Short film
2016	93 Days	Dr. David Brett-Major	
2018	Peterloo	General Sir John Byng	
2018	Outlaw King	John of Strathbogie, 9th Earl of Atholl	
2019	Backdraft 2	Captain White	Direct-to-video
2022	The Deal	Michael	
TBA	Object Permanence	Barry	Post-production

=== Television ===
Year	Title	Role	Notes
1994	Lovejoy	Freddy	Episode: "Day of Reckoning"
1994	Soldier Soldier	Tim	Episode: "Further Education"
1995	Game On	Chris	Episode: "Fame"
1996	Hamish Macbeth	Gavin Robb	Episode: "In Search of a Rose"
1996	Chef!	Businessman	Episode: "Lessons in Talking"
1997	Snap	Jed	Episode: "Finger of Fame"
1999	Psychos	Dr. 'Shug' Nevin	Series regular; 6 episodes
2000–2003	Monarch of the Glen	Archie MacDonald	Series regular; 43 episodes
2002	French and Saunders	Archie MacDonald	Episode: "Celebrity Christmas Puddings"
2002, 2003	Strange	Rich	2 episodes
2004	Agatha Christie's Poirot	Ferguson	Episode: "Death on the Nile"
2005	The Brief	Michael Galbraith	Episode: "The Architect's Wife"
2006	Ancient Rome: The Rise and Fall of an Empire	Athaulf	Mini-series; episode: "The Fall of Rome"
2006	The Shell Seekers	Richard Lomax	Mini-series; 2 episodes
2007	Reichenbach Falls	Jack Harvey	Television film
2008	M.I. High	Bruce Boardman	Episode: "Greenfinger"
2009	Murdoch Mysteries	Inspector Edward Scanlon	Episode: "Snakes and Ladders"
2009	The Mentalist	Dr. Royston Daniel	Episode: "Russet Potatoes"
2010	Lewis	Sebastian Anderson	Episode: "Your Sudden Death Question"
2011	Moving On	Mick	Episode: "Donor"
2011	Black Mirror	Martin	Episode: "The National Anthem"
2012	Skins	Gregory McGuinness	Episode: "Mini"
2012	Lip Service	Thomas Delaware	Episode: "Series 2; episode 5"
2013	The Sweeter Side of Life	Benny Christophe	Television film
2013	Borgen	Jeremy Welsh	Series 3 regular; 8 episodes
2013	Agatha Christie's Marple	Colonel Hillingdon	Episode: "A Caribbean Mystery"
2013	Taken: The Search for Sophie Parker	Ambassador Hillman	Television film
2013–2014	Dracula	Lord Rothcroft	Series regular; 6 episodes
2015	Wolf Hall	William Brereton	Series regular; 6 episodes
2015	A.D. The Bible Continues	James the Just	Recurring role; 3 episodes
2016	Midsomer Murders	Felix Lancaster	Episode: "Habeas Corpus"
2016–2017	Cold Feet	Jamie Moore/Poynter	Recurring role; 4 episodes
2017	The Loch	Craig Petrie	Series regular; 6 episodes
2018–2021	Unforgotten	Ex-DCI John Bentley	Series regular; 9 episodes
2019	Death in Paradise	Ewan Boyd	Episode: "Beyond the Shining Sea"
2019	Deep Water	Guy Riverty	Mini-series regular; 6 episodes
2022	Professor T.	Simon Lanesborough	Series 2 regular; 4 episodes
2022	The Crown	Richard Aylard	Series 5 recurring role; 3 episodes
2022–2025	Andor	Perrin Fertha	Recurring role; 11 episodes
2023	Vigil	Wing Cmdr. Anthony Chapman	Episode: "Series 2; episode 1"
2025	The Bombing of Pan Am 103	Alastair Campbell QC	Mini-series; 1 episode
2025	Prisoner 951	Tobias Ellwood	Mini-series; 4 episodes
2026	The Marlow Murder Club	Ferdy Blake	Episode: "An Appetite for Murder: Parts 1 & 2"
2026	Granite Harbour	Richard Loughty	Series 3; 3 episodes

=== Theatre ===
Year	Title	Role	Venue	Notes
2005	The Gigli Concert	J.P.W. King	Assembly Rooms, Edinburgh	
2009	The Priory	Ben	Royal Court Theatre, London	
2014	Tiger Country	John	Hampstead Theatre, London	

=== Video games ===
Year	Title	Role	Notes
2010	BioShock 2	Additional voices	
2026	007 First Light	Q (voice)	Also motion capture
2026	The Incident at Galley House	Oswald Galley (voice)	
