= Bob Random =

Canadian character actor (born 1945)

- Born: Robert Chambers; January 29, 1945 (age 81); Chilliwack, British Columbia, Canada
- Occupation: Actor
- Years active: 1960s–1980s
- Spouse: Ida Random (divorced)

Bob Random (born January 29, 1945) is a Canadian character actor who appeared in both movies and television from the mid-1960s to the late 1980s.

== Television and film roles ==
Random's television work tended to be in dramatic roles, in venerable programs like Dr. Kildare, Mr. Novak, Ben Casey, and Lassie, or Western series, such as Gunsmoke - in 1965/66 playing “Verlyn Print” in series 11 episode 11 “South Wind”, then six weeks later as the title character and Festus's nephew in series 11 episode 17 "Sweet Billy, Singer of Songs"), also in 1966’s series 12 episode 4 "The Mission” as Reb Jessup,The Virginian, Iron Horse, and The Legend of Jesse James. He also did occasional comedies, including The Dick Van Dyke Show and Gidget (in a recurring role as Gidget's friend Mark).

He appeared in This Property Is Condemned (1966) and ...tick...tick...tick... (1970). Mosby's Marauders (1967), in which he played Private Lomax, was later repeated on The Wonderful World of Disney under the title Willie and the Yank. His last appearances were in an episode of Get Christie Love, and as the biker Reaper in the second and third The Danger Zone movies, taking over from Robert Canada, who played the character in the original.

Random played John Dale in Orson Welles's long-unfinished film The Other Side of the Wind, which was finally released in 2018. Random appeared alongside John Huston, Peter Bogdanovich and Dennis Hopper.

== Personal life ==
Random was divorced from Ida Random, who received an Academy Award nomination in 1988 for Best Art Direction-Set Decoration on Rain Man. Random currently resides near Qualicum Beach, British Columbia.
