= Frank Marshall (filmmaker) =

American film producer and director (born 1946)

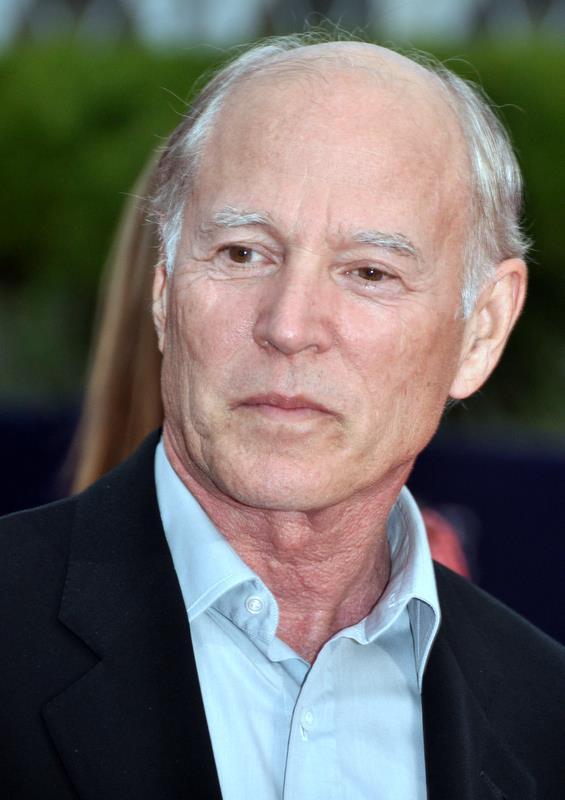
- Marshall at 2012 Deauville American Film Festival
- Born: Frank Wilton Marshall; September 13, 1946 (age 80); Glendale, California, U.S.
- Education: University of California, Los Angeles (BA)
- Occupations: Film producer, film director
- Years active: 1968–present
- Spouse: Kathleen Kennedy (m. 1987)
- Children: 2

Frank Wilton Marshall (born September 13, 1946) is an American film producer and director. He often collaborated with his wife, film producer Kathleen Kennedy, with whom he founded the production company Amblin Entertainment, along with Steven Spielberg. In 1991, he founded, with Kennedy, The Kennedy/Marshall Company, a film production company. Since May 2012, with Kennedy taking on the role of President of Lucasfilm, Marshall has been Kennedy/Marshall's sole principal.

Marshall has worked with directors such as Spielberg, Paul Greengrass, Peter Bogdanovich, David Fincher, M. Night Shyamalan, Gary Ross, and Robert Zemeckis. He has also directed the films Arachnophobia (1990), Alive (1993), Congo (1995), Eight Below (2006), and the documentaries The Bee Gees: How Can You Mend a Broken Heart (2020), Jazz Fest: A New Orleans Story (2022) and The Beach Boys (2024).

Marshall has produced various successful film franchises, including Indiana Jones, Back to the Future, Bourne and Jurassic Park, and has received five nominations for the Academy Award for Best Picture. His other accolades include the Irving G. Thalberg Memorial Award, bestowed by the Academy of Motion Picture Arts and Sciences to "creative producers, whose bodies of work reflect a consistently high quality of motion picture production", the David O. Selznick Achievement Award in Theatrical Motion Pictures, two Grammy Awards, a Sports Emmy Award and a Tony Award. Marshall is one of the few people to have received an Emmy, Grammy, Oscar and Tony (EGOT), with one of the awards being non-competitive.

== Early life and education ==
Marshall was born on September 13, 1946, in Glendale, California, a suburb of Los Angeles. He is the son of guitarist, conductor and composer Jack Marshall. His early years were spent in the Los Angeles neighborhood of Van Nuys. In 1961, his family moved to Newport Beach, where he attended Newport Harbor High School, and was active in music, drama, cross country and track. He entered UCLA in 1964 as an engineering major, and graduated in 1968 with a degree in political science. While at UCLA, he was initiated into Alpha Tau Omega fraternity, helped create its first NCAA soccer team, and played collegiate soccer there in 1966, 1967 and 1968.

== Career ==
In 1966, he met film director Peter Bogdanovich at a birthday party for the daughter of director John Ford, a friend of his father. Marshall volunteered to work on Bogdanovich's first film, Targets (1968), which became his apprenticeship in film production, as he assumed various productions roles, even appearing in a bit part. Following graduation from UCLA, Marshall spent the next two years working in Aspen and Marina del Rey, as a waiter/guitar player at "The Randy Tar," a steak and lobster restaurant. While traveling through Europe in March 1970, he received another call from Bogdanovich, offering him a position on The Last Picture Show (1971). Three days later he arrived in Archer City, Texas, doubling as location manager and actor in this seminal film. Under Bogdanovich's guidance, Marshall would work his way up from producer's assistant to associate producer on five more films. He branched out to work with Martin Scorsese as a line producer on the music documentary The Last Waltz (1978) and as an associate producer on director Walter Hill's gritty crime thriller, The Driver (1978). The following year, Marshall earned his first executive producer credit on Hill's cult classic street gang movie, The Warriors (1979) and first producer credit on George Lucas and Steven Spielberg's Raiders of the Lost Ark (1981). He continued to collaborate with Bogdanovich, completing their tenth film together, Orson Welles' unfinished The Other Side of the Wind in 2018.

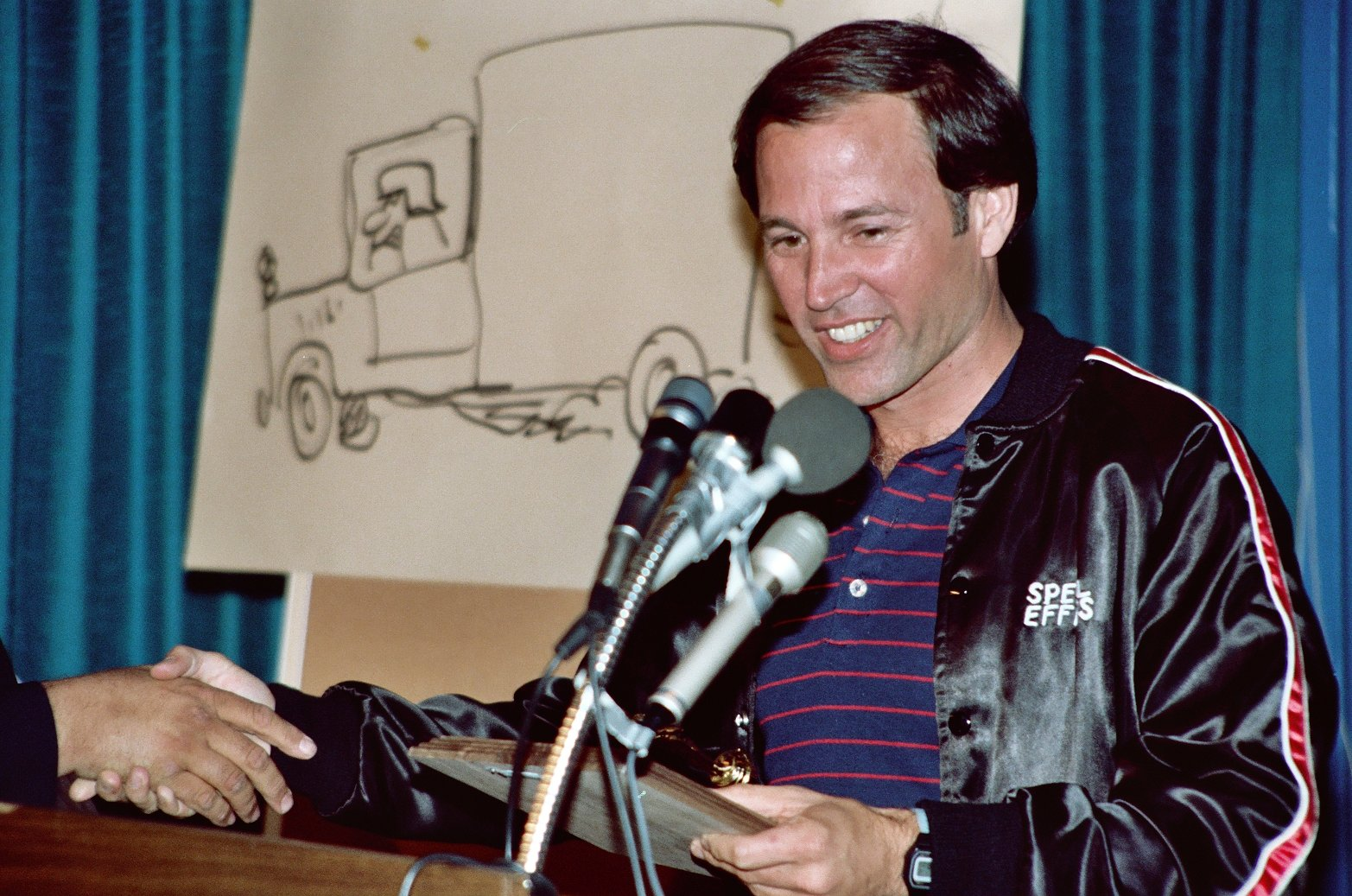
Marshall in 1982

In 1981, together with his future wife Kathleen Kennedy and Steven Spielberg, he co-founded Amblin Entertainment, one of the industry's most productive and profitable production companies. As a producer, Marshall has received five Oscar nominations for Best Picture for The Curious Case of Benjamin Button (2008), Seabiscuit (2003), The Sixth Sense (1999), The Color Purple (1985) and Raiders of the Lost Ark (1981). During the 1980s and 1990s, Marshall served on the advisory board of the National Student Film Institute.

His feature film directing debut was the thriller Arachnophobia (1990), starring Jeff Daniels. In 1991, he and Kennedy created The Kennedy/Marshall Company and began producing their own films. Marshall directed the company's first film, Alive (1993), about a rugby team struggling to survive in the snow after their plane crashes in the Andes. Next, he directed Congo (1995), based on Michael Crichton's novel, followed by Eight Below (2006), an adventure about loyalty and the bonds of friendship set in the extreme wilderness of Antarctica. In 1998, he directed the episode "Mare Tranquilitatis", for the Emmy Award-winning HBO miniseries From the Earth to the Moon. As part of ESPN's 30 for 30 series, Marshall directed a documentary about Olympian Johann Olav Koss entitled Right to Play (2012). (the name of Koss's humanitarian organization). Marshall stated that the documentary, broadcast in 2012, sought to capture not only Koss' sporting career and the ideals behind his nonprofit organization, but also his "drive and how it has changed the world."

From 1991 to 2012, The Kennedy/Marshall Company produced many films, including The Sixth Sense, Signs, Seabiscuit, The Curious Case of Benjamin Button, War Horse, Lincoln, Sully, the Bourne series and the feature documentary The Armstrong Lie (2013). Since taking over as sole principal of the company, Marshall has broadened its slate beyond feature films to include television, documentaries and Broadway musicals. Those include the summer blockbuster series Jurassic World, Orson Welles's final film, The Other Side of the Wind, and the Emmy Award-nominated documentaries Sinatra: All or Nothing at All, Laurel Canyon and McCartney 3,2,1. In 2020, he directed the Hélder Guimarães virtual magic shows The Present and The Future for the Geffen Stayhouse, both which had sold-out runs and The Bee Gees: How Can You Mend a Broken Heart, which was nominated for six Emmys. In 2022, he produced the Tony Award-winning musical A Strange Loop and co-directed the Grammy-winning documentary Jazz Fest: A New Orleans Story. His 2023 productions included Indiana Jones and the Dial of Destiny and Good Night, Oscar, starring Tony Winner Sean Hayes. In 2024, Marshall directed The Hope Theory at Geffen Playhouse with Hélder Guimarães, The Beach Boys documentary for Disney+ and produced Twisters for Universal Pictures.

== Personal life ==
Marshall is a former VP, member of the board of directors and member of the Executive Committee of the United States Olympic and Paralympic Committee (USOPC). He was awarded the Olympic Shield in 2005, and inducted into the U.S. Olympic Hall of Fame class of 2008 for his years of service to the USOPC.

Currently, he serves on the board of Athletes for Hope, the UCLA School of Theater, Film & Television Executive Board and as Board Co-Chair of The Archer School for Girls. He is a recipient of the Golden Plate Award of the American Academy of Achievement presented alongside Kathleen Kennedy by Awards Council member George Lucas, the UCLA Alumni Professional Achievement Award and the California Mentor Initiative's Leadership Award. In June 2004, Marshall gave the Commencement Address at the UCLA College of Letters and Science graduation ceremony in Pauley Pavilion.

Marshall enjoys magic and music and has performed under the moniker of "Dr. Fantasy" or "DJ Master Frank". A devoted long-distance runner, Marshall and American premiere miler Steve Scott founded the Rock 'n' Roll Marathon Series, which debuted in 1998 in San Diego as the largest first-time marathon in history.

== Filmography ==
=== Director ===
Film

Year	Title	Director	Executive producer
1990	Arachnophobia	Yes	Yes
1993	Alive	Yes	No
1995	Congo	Yes	Yes
2006	Eight Below	Yes	Yes
2011	Back for the Future (short film)	Yes	No

Documentary films

Year	Title	Director	Executive producer
2020	The Bee Gees: How Can You Mend a Broken Heart	Yes	Yes
2022	Carole King & James Taylor: Just Call Out My Name	Yes	Yes
2022	Jazz Fest: A New Orleans Story	Yes	Yes
2023	Rather	Yes	Yes
2024	The Beach Boys	Yes	Yes
2026	Pete Townshend: Behind Blue Eyes	Yes	Yes

Television

Year	Title	Director	Executive producer	Notes
1993	Johnny Bago	Yes	Yes	Episode: "Johnny's Manly Act"
1998	From the Earth to the Moon	Yes	No	Episode: "Mare Tranquilitatis"
2012	ESPN Films Presents	Yes	No	Episode: "Right to Play"
2014	The Man vs. The Machine	Yes	No	
2022	Picabo	Yes	Yes	

=== Producer credits ===
Producer

- Paper Moon (1973)
- At Long Last Love (1975)
- Nickelodeon (1976)
- Raiders of the Lost Ark (1981)
- Poltergeist (1982)
- The Color Purple (1985)
- The Money Pit (1986)
- Empire of the Sun (1987)
- Who Framed Roger Rabbit (1988)
- Always (1989)
- Hook (1991)
- Noises Off (1992)
- Milk Money (1994)
- The Indian in the Cupboard (1995)
- Olympic Glory (1998)
- The Sixth Sense (1999)
- Snow Falling on Cedars (1999)
- A Map of the World (1999)
- Signs (2002)
- Seabiscuit (2003)
- The Young Black Stallion (2003)
- The Bourne Supremacy (2004)
- Roving Mars (2006)
- Hoot (2006)
- The Bourne Ultimatum (2007)
- Indiana Jones and the Kingdom of the Crystal Skull (2008)
- The Curious Case of Benjamin Button (2008)
- Crossing Over (2009)
- The Last Airbender (2010)
- The Bourne Legacy (2012)
- The Armstrong Lie (2013)
- Running Blind (2013)
- Jurassic World (2015)
- The BFG (2016)
- Jason Bourne (2016)
- Finding Oscar (2016)
- Assassin's Creed (2016)
- Satan & Adam (2018)
- Jurassic World: Fallen Kingdom (2018)
- The Other Side of the Wind (2018)
- A Final Cut for Orson (2018)
- The Gift: The Journey of Johnny Cash (2019)
- Battle at Big Rock (2019)
- Jimmy Dennis: How to Survive Death Row (2019)
- Waiting for Godot (2021)
- Diana (2021)
- Mr. A & Mr. M: The Story of A&M Records (2021)
- McCartney 3,2,1 (2021)
- I Need Space (2022)
- Jurassic World Dominion (2022)
- Indiana Jones and the Dial of Destiny (2023)
- Jurassic World: Chaos Theory (2024)
- Twisters (2024)
- Music by John Williams (2024)
- Jurassic World Rebirth (2025)

Associate producer

- Daisy Miller (1974)
- The Driver (1978)

Line producer

- The Last Waltz (1978)

Executive producer

- The Warriors (1979)
- Twilight Zone: The Movie (1983)
- Indiana Jones and the Temple of Doom (1984)
- Gremlins (1984)
- Young Sherlock Holmes (1985)
- Back to the Future (1985)
- The Goonies (1985)
- Fandango (1985)
- An American Tail (1986)
- Batteries Not Included (1987)
- Back to the Future Part II (1989)
- Dad (1989)
- Tummy Trouble (1989)
- Indiana Jones and the Last Crusade (1989)
- Gremlins 2: The New Batch (1990)
- Back to the Future Part III (1990)
- Roller Coaster Rabbit (1990)
- Joe Versus the Volcano (1990)
- An American Tail: Fievel Goes West (1991)
- Cape Fear (1991)
- A Brief History of Time (1991) (uncredited)
- Tiny Toon Adventures: How I Spent My Vacation (1992) (Direct-to-video)
- Were Back! A Dinosaurs Story (1993)
- A Dangerous Woman (1993)
- Swing Kids (1993)
- A Far Off Place (1993)
- The Sports Pages (2001; TV film)
- The Bourne Identity (2002)
- Mr. 3000 (2004)
- Ponyo (2009) (U.S. dub production)
- The Special Relationship (2010; TV film)
- Hereafter (2010)
- War Horse (2011)
- The Secret World of Arrietty (2012) (U.S. dub)
- From Up on Poppy Hill (2013) (U.S. dub)
- The Ordained (2013; TV pilot)
- The Wind Rises (2014) (U.S. dub)
- The Tale of the Princess Kaguya (2014) (U.S. dub)
- Transcend (2014)
- Sinatra: All or Nothing at All (2015)
- An Equal Playing Field (2015)
- What the Hell Happened to Jai Alai (2016)
- Mars Project (2016; TV pilot)
- Boston: An American Running Story (2017)
- The China Hustle (2017)
- What Haunts Us (2018)
- The People's Fighters: Teofilo Stevens and the Legend of Cuban Boxing (2018)
- The Nagano Tapes (2018)
- The Golden Generation (2018; Five Rings film)
- They'll Love Me When I'm Dead (2018)
- The Grizzlies (2018)
- 1983 (2018; TV series)
- Why We Hate (2019)
- Jurassic World (Motion Comics) (2019)
- The Iron Hammer (2020)
- Laurel Canyon (2020)
- Jurassic World Camp Cretaceous (2020–2022)
- The Distance (2021)
- Rulon Gardner Won't Die (2021)
- A Brilliant Curling Story (2022)
- The Redeem Team (2022)
- The Fourth Wall (2023)
- The Space Race (2023)
- SF Sounds (2023)
- All That is Sacred (2023)
- Timeless Heroes: Indiana Jones and Harrison Ford (2023)
- Jurassic World: Chaos Theory (2024–2025)
- Death by Numbers (2024)
- Tiger Tiger (2024)
- Spinal Tap II: The End Continues (2025)

Co-executive producer

- Innerspace (1987)
- The Land Before Time (1988)

=== Other credits ===
Location manager

- The Last Picture Show (1971)
- What's Up Doc? (1972)
- The Thief Who Came to Dinner (1973)

Production management

- E.T. the Extra-Terrestrial (1982)
- The Other Side of the Wind (2018)

2nd unit director

- Raiders of the Lost Ark (1981) (Uncredited)
- Indiana Jones and the Temple of Doom (1984) (London unit)
- Back to the Future (1985)
- The Color Purple (1985) (Kenya)
- Empire of the Sun (1987)
- Who Framed Roger Rabbit (1988) (UK unit)
- Indiana Jones and the Last Crusade (1989)
- Always (1989) (Montana unit)
- Noises Off (1992)
- Milk Money (1994)
- Snow Falling on Cedars (1999)
- Seabiscuit (2003)

Acting roles

Year	Title	Role	Notes
1968	Targets	Ticket Boy	
1971	The Last Picture Show	Tommy Logan	
1976	Nickelodeon	Dinsdale's assistant	
1981	Raiders of the Lost Ark	Flying Wing Pilot	
1984	Indiana Jones and the Temple of Doom	Tourist at Airport	
2006	Hoot	Golfer #2	
2012	The Secret World of Arrietty	Additional voices	U.S. dub

== Awards and nominations ==
Award	Year	Nominated work	Category	Result	Ref.
Academy Awards	1982	Raiders of the Lost Ark	Best Picture	Nominated	
Academy Awards	1986	The Color Purple	Best Picture	Nominated	
Academy Awards	2000	The Sixth Sense	Best Picture	Nominated	
Academy Awards	2004	Seabiscuit	Best Picture	Nominated	
Academy Awards	2009	The Curious Case of Benjamin Button	Best Picture	Nominated	
Academy Awards	2019	Irving G. Thalberg Memorial Award		Won	
British Academy Film Awards	1982	Raiders of the Lost Ark	Best Film	Nominated	
British Academy Film Awards	2000	The Sixth Sense	Best Film	Nominated	
British Academy Film Awards	2008	The Bourne Ultimatum	Outstanding British Film	Nominated	
British Academy Film Awards	2009	The Curious Case of Benjamin Button	Best Film	Nominated	
CinemaCon Awards	1982	Inkpot Award		Won	
Grammy Awards	2023	Jazz Fest: A New Orleans Story	Best Music Film	Won	
Grammy Awards	2026	Music by John Williams	Best Music Film	Won	
News & Documentary Emmy Awards	2025	The Space Race	Outstanding Science and Technology Documentary	Nominated	
Primetime Emmy Awards	2010	The Special Relationship	Outstanding Television Movie	Nominated	
Primetime Emmy Awards	2015	Sinatra: All or Nothing at All	Outstanding Documentary or Nonfiction Special	Nominated	
Primetime Emmy Awards	2018	What Haunts Us	Exceptional Merit in Documentary Filmmaking	Nominated	
Primetime Emmy Awards	2020	Laurel Canyon: A Place in Time	Outstanding Documentary or Nonfiction Special	Nominated	
Primetime Emmy Awards	2021	The Bee Gees: How Can You Mend a Broken Heart	Outstanding Documentary or Nonfiction Special	Nominated	
Primetime Emmy Awards	2021	The Bee Gees: How Can You Mend a Broken Heart	Outstanding Directing for a Documentary/Nonfiction Program	Nominated	
Producers Guild of America Awards	2004	Seabiscuit	Outstanding Producer of Theatrical Motion Pictures	Nominated	
Producers Guild of America Awards	2008	David O. Selznick Achievement Award in Theatrical Motion Pictures		Won	
Producers Guild of America Awards	2009	The Curious Case of Benjamin Button	Outstanding Producer of Theatrical Motion Pictures	Nominated	
Producers Guild of America Awards	2021	Laurel Canyon: A Place in Time	Outstanding Producer of Non-Fiction Television	Nominated	
Saturn Awards	1991	Arachnophobia	Best Director	Nominated	
Saturn Awards	1993	George Pal Memorial Award		Won	
Saturn Awards	1996	Congo	Best Director	Nominated	
Sports Emmy Awards	2023	The Redeem Team	Outstanding Long Documentary	Won	
Tony Awards	2022	A Strange Loop	Best Musical	Won	
Tony Awards	2024	Water for Elephants	Best Musical	Nominated	
Tony Awards	2025	Buena Vista Social Club	Best Musical	Nominated	
