= Filip Jan Rymsza =

Polish-born filmmaker and writer (born 1977)

- (Mathieu Young | Royal Road Entertainment) 2018
- Born: December 29, 1977 (age 48); Olecko, Poland
- Education: University of Chicago
- Occupations: Film producer, director and writer
- Years active: 2004–present
- Notable work: Mosquito State; The Other Side of the Wind; HOPPER/WELLES

Filip Jan Rymsza (born December 29, 1977) is a Polish-born filmmaker and writer. He is best known for, along with fellow producer Frank Marshall, spearheading the successful completion of Orson Welles' last major work, The Other Side of the Wind. Filmed in the early 1970s but not fully edited, the completed movie debuted at the 75th annual Venice Film Festival in August 2018. He was also a producer on the award-winning Morgan Neville documentary They'll Love Me When I'm Dead.

Rymsza made his feature film directorial debut in 2020, with Mosquito State. It premiered at the 77th Venice Film Festival, where it was awarded the Bisaro d'Oro for Best Cinematography.

Mosquito State was released by AMC Networks on Shudder. It was The New York Times' Critic's Pick, described as "a disquieting merger of body horror and social commentary... pierced by moments of disturbing beauty".

== Biography ==
Filip Jan Rymsza was born on December 29, 1977, in Olecko, Poland. After the Soviet-sponsored Polish government imposed martial law in December 1981, his father, Wladyslaw Rymsza, faced jail time for his involvement with the pro-democratic Solidarity trade union. Wladyslaw Rymsza and his wife, Alina, fled to Chicago. They were joined by their son in 1985. Filip Jan Rymsza studied philosophy and economics at the University of Chicago. He is a principal in Royal Road Entertainment, which is based in Los Angeles.

== Filmography ==
Year	Title	Credited as				Notes
Year	Title	Director	Producer	Writer	Editor	Notes
2004	Sandcastles	Yes	Yes	Yes	Yes	Student film(s)
2007	Dustclouds	Yes	Yes	Yes	Yes	Student film(s)
2014	Blue Blood	No	Executive	No	No	(Berlin International Film Festival)
2015	Oh Gallow Lay	No	Yes	No	No	(Venice Film Festival)
2018	The Other Side of the Wind	No	Yes	No	No	(Venice Film Festival)
2018	They'll Love Me When I'm Dead	No	Yes	No	No	(Venice Film Festival)
2018	A Final Cut for Orson	No	Yes	No	No	(Telluride Film Festival)
2019	Lost Transmissions	No	Yes	No	No	(Tribeca Film Festival)
2019	Valley of the Gods	No	Yes	No	No	(Polish Film Festival)
2020	HOPPER/WELLES	No	Yes	No	No	(Venice Film Festival)
2020	Mosquito State	Yes	Yes	Yes	No	(Venice Film Festival - Bisato d'Oro)
2023	In the Rearview	No	Supervising	No	No	(Cannes Film Festival)

== Awards ==
- Mosquito State ― Anatomy Crime and Horror Film Festival ― Best Picture: All Categories
- Mosquito State ― Anatomy Crime and Horror Film Festival ― Best Director: All Categories
- Mosquito State ― Horrorant Film Festival ― Best Feature Film
- Mosquito State ― Horrorant Film Festival ― Best Director
- Mosquito State ― Geneva International Film Festival ― Reflet d'Or (Best Feature Film)
- Mosquito State ― Sitges Film Festival ― Secció Oficial Fantàstic (Best Visual Effects)
- Mosquito State ― Polish Film Festival ― Golden Claw (Best Feature Film)
- The Other Side of the Wind and They'll Love Me When I'm Dead ― National Board of Review ― William K. Everson Award for Film History
- The Other Side of the Wind ― National Society of Film Critics ― Film Heritage Award
- The Other Side of the Wind ― Los Angeles Film Critics Association ― Special citation

== Writing ==
- As I Stared into the Still, Sleepless Night (2003)
- Key Point Three (Repeating) (2004)
