= They'll Love Me When I'm Dead =

- Film poster
- Directed by: Morgan Neville
- Produced by: Josh Karp; Morgan Neville; Korelan Matteson; Filip Jan Rymsza
- Starring: Peter Bogdanovich; Oja Kodar; Orson Welles; Steve Ecclesine
- Narrated by: Alan Cumming
- Edited by: Aaron Wickenden; Jason Zeldes
- Music by: Daniel Wohl
- Production companies: Tremolo Productions; Royal Road Entertainment
- Distributed by: Netflix
- Release dates: August 30, 2018 (Venice); November 2, 2018 (United States)
- Running time: 98 minutes
- Country: United States
- Language: English

They'll Love Me When I'm Dead is a 2018 American documentary film, directed by Morgan Neville. It documents the ill-fated production of The Other Side of the Wind, directed by Orson Welles. The film had its world premiere at the Venice Film Festival on August 30, 2018. It was released on November 2, 2018, by Netflix.

== Cast ==
- Alan Cumming (narrator)
- Peter Bogdanovich
- Steve Ecclesine
- Howard Grossman
- Danny Huston
- Oja Kodar
- Rich Little
- Frank Marshall
- Cybill Shepherd
- Beatrice Welles
- Orson Welles

== Production ==
In May 2017, it was announced Morgan Neville would direct a documentary film on the making of the Orson Welles' film The Other Side of the Wind. It was produced by Neville, Josh Karp, Korelan Matteson and Filip Jan Rymsza. Netflix distributed the film and it debuted on the streaming service on November 2, 2018.

== Release ==
The documentary had its premieres at the Venice Film Festival and Telluride Film Festival on August 30, 2018. It was later screened at New York Film Festival in October 2018. On November 1, 2018, it opened SFFILM's Doc Stories Film Series in San Francisco.

They'll Love Me When I'm Dead, which takes its name from a prophetic comment Welles made to Peter Bogdanovich, centers on Welles' return to the U.S. in the early 1970s to shoot his ill-fated Hollywood comeback film. The documentary concludes with his death in October 1985. "Welles is the protagonist of my documentary," Neville said. "[The Other Side of the Wind] is so autobiographical, even though he said it was not."

=== Critical reception ===
On review aggregator Rotten Tomatoes, the film holds an approval rating of 92%, based on 38 reviews with an average rating of 7.7/10. The website's critic consensus reads: "They'll Love Me When I'm Dead opens an entertaining window into the creative process – and late-period professional travails – of a brilliant filmmaker." Metacritic gives the film a weighted average score of 77 out of 100, based on 18 critics, indicating "generally favorable reviews".
