= Gail Lyon =

American film producer

Gail Lyon is a film producer since 1997.

== Filmography ==
=== Film ===
Year	Film	Credit	Ref.
1997	Gattaca	Co-producer	
2000	Erin Brockovich	Co-producer	
2002	Stuart Little 2	Executive producer	
2003	Peter Pan	Executive producer	
2004	Win a Date with Tad Hamilton!	Executive producer	
2006	Stick It	Producer	
2010	Edge of Darkness	Executive producer	
2017	Moss	Executive producer	
2018	Destination Wedding	Producer	

=== Television ===
Year	Title	Credit	Notes	Ref.
1998	The Pentagon Wars	Co-executive producer	Television film	
2016	Last Teenagers of the Apocalypse	Executive producer		
