= Matt Cimber =

American film director and producer (born 1936)

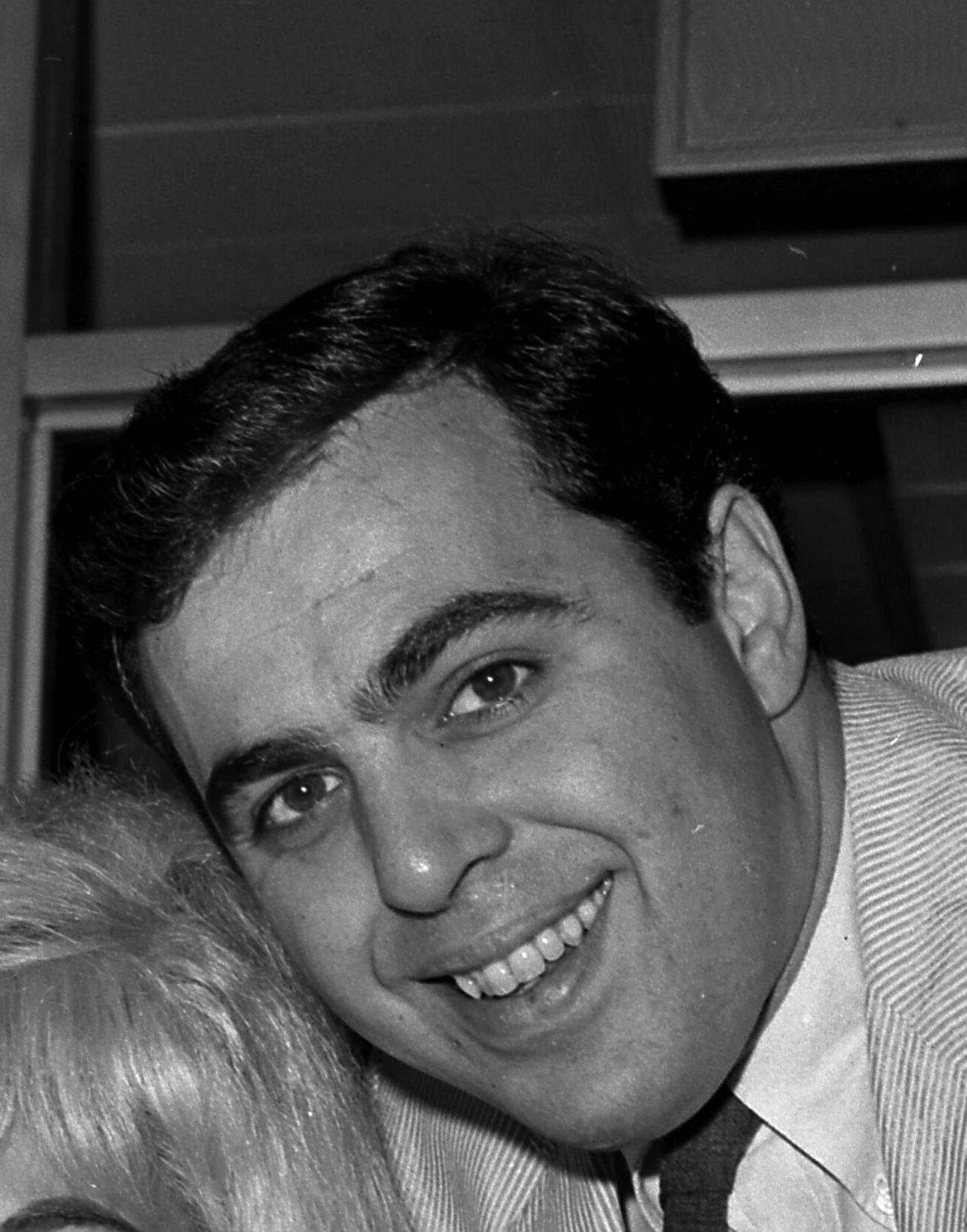
- Cimber in 1965
- Born: Thomas Vitale Ottaviano; January 12, 1936 (age 90); The Bronx, New York City, U.S.
- Other names: Gary Harper; Matteo Ottaviano; Rinehart Segway
- Spouses: Jayne Mansfield (m. 1964; died 1967) Christy Hanak (m. 1967; div. 1978) Lynn Fero (m. 1987)
- Children: 1

Matt Cimber (born Thomas Vitale Ottaviano; January 12, 1936) is an American producer, director, and writer. He is known for directing genre films including The Candy Tangerine Man, The Witch Who Came from the Sea, Hundra, and Butterfly. Cimber has been called "an unsung hero of 1970s exploitation cinema." He was co-founder and director of the Gorgeous Ladies of Wrestling (GLOW) professional wrestling promotion and syndicated television series. Cimber also occasionally acts in films, television, and theatre.

Cimber was the third husband of actress Jayne Mansfield, and they had a son together, Antonio, born in 1965. He directed Mansfield on stage and in the film Single Room Furnished. This was not released until 1968, after her death in a car accident the year before.

== Career ==
=== Theater ===
Cimber began his directing career in the early 1960s at the Londonderry Theater Workshop in Vermont. He went to New York to direct Off-Broadway plays, which included Young and Beautiful, an adaptation of the short stories of F. Scott Fitzgerald, and the U.S. premiere of works by Jean Cocteau (Antigone, Orphee, The Holy Terrors, Intimate Relations). Others included The Little Hut, The Voice of the Turtle, The Ignorants Abroad, and The Moon is Blue. He adapted John Steinbeck's Burning Bright as a play, the cast of which featured future Academy Award winner Sandy Dennis. Cimber's regional theater credits include The Country Girl, Send Me No Flowers, Susan Slept Here, and The Tender Trap.

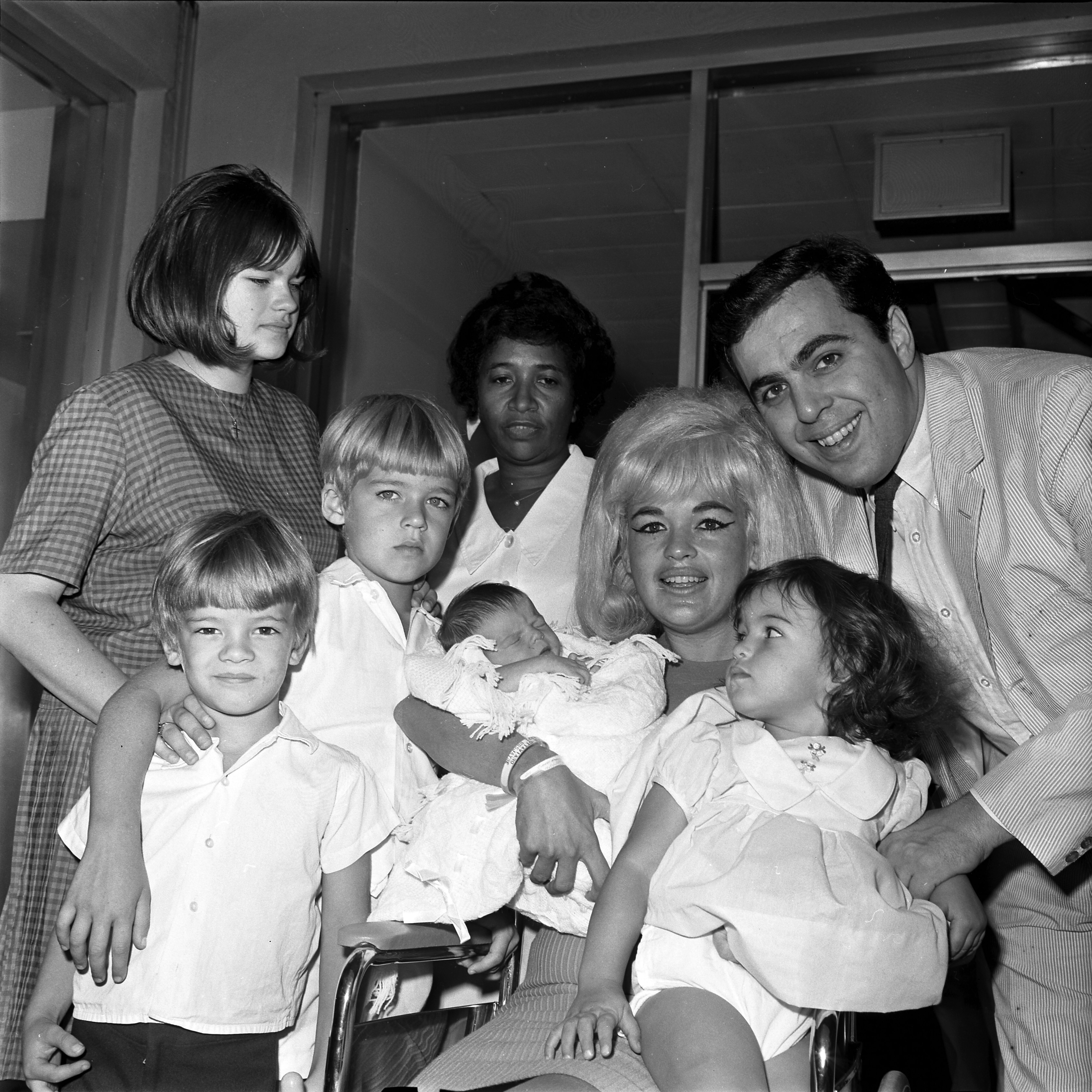
Matt Cimber with his wife Jayne Mansfield, their newborn son and her four other children (1965)

He met his future wife, Jayne Mansfield, while directing a 1964 revival of William Inge's Bus Stop. He directed and co-starred with her in productions of The Rabbit Habit and Champagne Complex. Another of Cimber's Off-Broadway credits, Walk-Up, was adapted as Single Room Furnished, a vehicle for Mansfield.

=== Film ===
Cimber made his debut as a film director (credited as "Matteo Ottaviano") with Single Room Furnished (1966). The film was shot by László Kovács, noted pioneer of the "American New Wave". It was introducted by Walter Winchell. Jayne Mansfield, in what was her last principal film role, was described by Variety as having "surprisingly moving moments".

Cimber proceeded to direct a string of "sexploitation films" under the pseudonyms "Gary Harper" and "Rinehart Segway," including Man & Wife: An Educational Film for Married Adults (1969), Sex and Astrology (1971), and The Sensually Liberated Female (1970), which was based on a best-selling book, The Sensuous Woman by Joan Garrity.

Cimber helmed three Blaxploitation films of the mid-70s: The Black Six (1973), Lady Cocoa (1975) starring Lola Falana, and The Candy Tangerine Man (1975), the last of which Samuel L. Jackson and Quentin Tarantino have cited among their favorite films.

In 1976, Cimber ventured into psychological thrillers with The Witch Who Came from the Sea, starring Millie Perkins and Lonny Chapman, with cinematography by Oscar nominee Dean Cundey. Vice cited it as "One of the Top 10 Greatest Banned Films" and "a bit of a masterpiece." The review aggregator Rotten Tomatoes voted it one of "90 Best '70s Horror Films."

Cimber's next film, A Time to Die, was a World War II thriller based on a novel by Mario Puzo. It starred Rod Taylor and Rex Harrison in his final screen performance. The film was shot in 1979 and released in 1982.

In 1982, Cimber teamed with Pia Zadora on the caper film Fake-Out, which premiered at the Cannes Film Festival and starred Telly Savalas and Desi Arnaz, Jr. He also directed the crime drama Butterfly, featuring Orson Welles and Stacy Keach, based on the novel The Butterfly by James M. Cain. Welles and composer Ennio Morricone were nominated for Golden Globe Awards, as was Zadora, who won the Golden Globe Award for Best Female Newcomer for her performance.

The following year, Cimber collaborated with actress Laurene Landon on the adventure films Hundra, which premiered at Cannes and featured a score by Ennio Morricone, and Yellow Hair and the Fortress of Gold.

=== Television ===
In 1986, Cimber co-created GLOW: Gorgeous Ladies of Wrestling, and served as executive producer and director of the syndicated television program. The show lasted for four seasons. It later inspired the fictionalized Netflix series GLOW. In GLOW, Marc Maron's character Sam Sylvia was inspired by Cimber.

=== Later career ===
Cimber wrote and directed the documentaries An American Icon: Coca-Cola, The Early Years (1997) and The History of United Nations (1996). He created and wrote the eight-minute intro for visitors to the United Nations, for which he received a special commendation from the U.N.

After a 20-year absence from feature films, he wrote and directed Miriam (2006), based on the real-life story of Holocaust survivor Miriam Schafer, starring Ariana Savalas as Schafer.

== Personal life ==
Cimber became involved with Jayne Mansfield when he directed her in a stage production of Bus Stop in Yonkers, New York. Mansfield married Cimber on September 24, 1964, in Mulegé, Baja California Sur, Mexico. Cimber managed Mansfield's career during their marriage. The marriage began to collapse in the wake of Cimber’s alleged physical abuse as well as Mansfield's alcohol abuse, open infidelities, and disclosure to Cimber that she had been happy only with a previous lover, Nelson Sardelli. They separated on July 11, 1965 and filed for divorce on July 20, 1966. The couple had a son, Antonio Raphael Ottaviano (a.k.a. Tony Cimber), born October 18, 1965, who became a director and actor.

Cimber's second wife is dress designer Christy Hilliard Hanak. Cimber and Hanak raised Tony Cimber.

== Awards and nominations ==
Cimber's Butterfly was nominated for three Golden Raspberry Awards: Worst Picture, Worst Director, and Worst Screenplay.

== Filmography ==
Year	Title	Dir.	Pro.	Wri.	Notes
1968	Single Room Furnished	Yes		Yes	Credited as Matteo Ottaviano
1969	Man & Wife: An Educational Film for Married Adults	Yes			Credited as Gary Harper
1970	Africanus Sexualis (Black Is Beautiful)	Yes	Yes		Credited as Gary Harper
1970	He & She	Yes			Credited as Gary Harper
1970	The Sexually Liberated Female	Yes	Yes	Yes	Credited as Gary Harper
1971	Sex and Astrology	Yes	Yes		Credited as Rinehart Segway
1971	Calliope	Yes	Yes		Credited as Gary Harper
1974	The Black Six	Yes	Yes	Yes	
1975	That Girl from Boston	Yes	Yes		
1975	Gemini Affair	Yes	Yes		
1975	Lady Cocoa	Yes	Yes		
1975	Alias Big Cherry	Yes	Yes		
1975	The Candy Tangerine Man	Yes	Yes		
1976	The Witch Who Came from the Sea	Yes	Yes		
1979	Do It In the Dirt		Yes		
1982	Butterfly	Yes	Yes	Yes	Nominated: Golden Raspberry Award for Worst Picture; Golden Raspberry Award for Worst Director; Golden Raspberry Award for Worst Screenplay
1982	Fake-Out	Yes	Yes	Yes	
1982	A Time to Die	Yes		Yes	with Joe Tornatore
1983	Hundra	Yes		Yes	
1984	Yellow Hair and the Fortress of Gold	Yes		Yes	
1986-89	Gorgeous Ladies of Wrestling	Yes	Yes		As co-creator Television series – 108 episodes
2006	Miriam	Yes	Yes	Yes	
2008	Peace for Profit	Yes			Documentary film
