= Eric Steven Stahl =

American film director

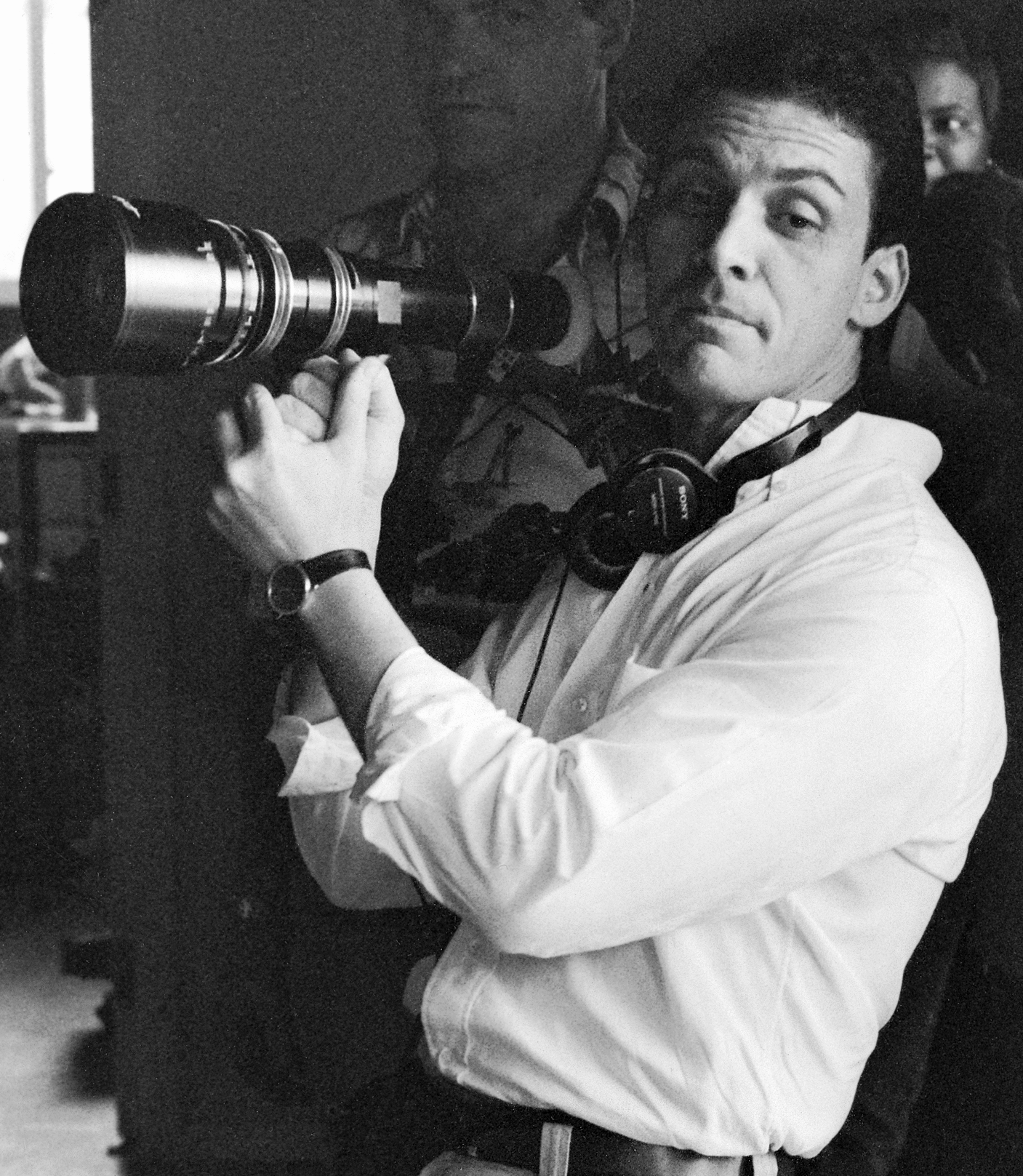
- Born: April 4, 1959 (age 67); Encino, California, U.S.
- Occupations: Director, Screenwriter, Producer, Editor
- Years active: 1980–present

Eric Steven Stahl (born April 4, 1959) is an American director, screenwriter, producer and editor who is known for making the world's first all-digital sound 70mm film called Digital Dream. Stahl's feature credits also include Final Approach, as well as Safe House and I-See-You.Com.

== Early years ==
Stahl was born on April 4, 1959, in Encino, California, to Martin and Miriam Stahl. Father, a Kennedy administration appointee, was made Director of U.S. Trade Center in 1963 in Milan Italy where Stahl grew up from the age of 3. Spending the better part of fourteen years in Europe, where he attended mostly Italian schools including the original Montessori in Milan. Stahl went on to complete his education stateside obtaining his motion picture degree from USC School of Cinematic Arts.

== Career ==
Set on a directing career, but also fascinated with the world of advertising and marketing, Stahl formed an integrated communication consultancy and production company in 1980 straight out of film school where he eventually directed numerous award winning national television spots, including the first digital stereo commercial, "It's a Chevy 1986" (Clio Award Winner), for GM's Chevy Cavalier. When one of his company's early clients, audio facility Glen Glenn Sound, tasked a then only 23-year-old Stahl with directing and producing the world's first all digital sound film, Stahl seized the opportunity to meld his two passions (filmmaking and marketing). What followed was Digital Dream - presented in 70mm six track stereo and costing $7.5 million, the project was co-sponsored by the top industry players including Panavision, Sony and Eastman Kodak, with visual effects supervision by Academy Award winner John Dykstra.

Stahl's commercial TV work went on to win him numerous awards from the Chicago Film Festival, the International Film & TV Festival of New York, the Lulu, as well as the Ad Age Certificate of Achievement for writing and directing one of the top 100 commercials of the decade.

By the late 1980s, Stahl turned to full-time movie making, forming Los Angeles based FilmQuest Pictures Corporation. His feature directorial debut, under his newly formed banner, Final Approach, starring James B. Sikking, Hector Elizondo, Madolyn Smith Osborne and Kevin McCarthy was the world's first all digital sound (DDD) film ever made. With over 800 visual effects and nearly 18,000 sound FX cues, it is still considered a technological benchmark. The picture had the second biggest opening in France (beat out by Teenage Mutant Ninja Turtles II) in the Summer of 1991. The film was released in the U.S. and in Europe using the Kodak/Optical Radiation CDS (Cinema Digital Sound) system. Final Approach went on to win the Golden Halo Award from Southern California Motion Picture Council and the Golden Scroll Award from the Academy of Science Fiction, Fantasy and Horror Films.

In the mid 1990s Stahl took a break from independent film making, landing a studio development deal at Walt Disney Studios where he co-authored two projects for the Touchstone and Disney labels: Semi-Pro and Cardiac Express.

After leaving Disney, Stahl set out to make his second feature film under the FilmQuest banner, Safe House, starring Patrick Stewart, Kimberly Williams and Hector Elizondo. The dramatic suspense thriller was co-written and co-produced with longtime collaborator Sean McLain.

Stahl's most recent feature directorial effort was the Warner Bros. Entertainment comedy I-See-You.Com starring Beau Bridges, Rosanna Arquette and Hector Elizondo. It had its premiere at the HBO US Comedy Arts Festival and screened at the Waterfront Film Festival in Michigan for its Midwestern premiere.

== Filmography ==
Year	Title	Director	Producer	Writer	Sound Track Producer
1984	Digital Dream	Yes	Yes	Yes	
1991	Final Approach	Yes	Yes	Yes	Yes
1994	Semi Pro (Touchstone Pictures)			Yes	
1995	Cardiac Express (Walt Disney)			Yes	
1998	2000 (Showtime)			Yes	
1998	Safe House	Yes	Yes	Yes	
2006	I-See-You.Com	Yes	Yes	Yes	Yes
