= Edith Díaz =

Puerto Rican actress

Edith Diaz
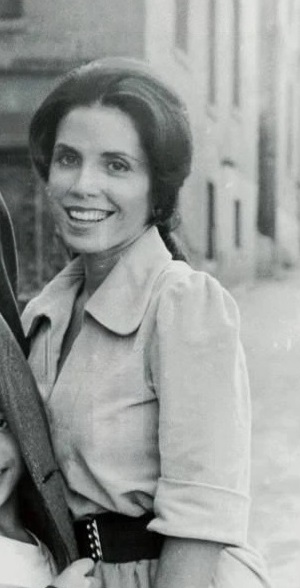
- Díaz in Popi (1976)
- Born: October 23, 1939; Mayagüez, Puerto Rico
- Died: November 19, 2009 (aged 70); Los Angeles, California

Edith Diaz (October 23, 1939 – November 19, 2009) was a Puerto Rican actress known for the roles in film, television, and stage. She co-founded the Screen Actors Guild's Ethnic Minorities Committee in 1972. In Hollywood, Díaz appeared in Born on the Fourth of July (1989), Sister Act (1992), Sister Act 2: Back in the habit (1993), Nick of Time (1995), Theodore Rex (1996), Scenes from a Class Struggle in Beverly Hills (1989), First Watch (2003) and Oh Baby! (2008). She also starred in Popi, the first Latin situation comedy in English-language television.

== Life and career ==
=== Early life and education ===
Diaz was born in Mayaguez, Puerto Rico. She had a sister and a brother, Arcadio, who later became a professor at Princeton University. Díaz studied within the University of Puerto Rico's (UPR) drama department and participated in plays such as La Espera. After leaving for New York, she studied under noted acting teacher Stella Adler and at the Actors Studio in the New York City. There, Díaz joined the Puerto Rican Traveling Theater. During this time, she began her participation in television roles. In 1973, Díaz joined the New York Shakespeare Festival, with whom she acted in Two gentlemen of Verona.

=== Film ===
Her film credits included Born on the Fourth of July (1989), Sister Act (1992), Sister Act 2: Back in the Habit (1993), Nick of Time (1995), and her final appearance, Oh Baby! (2008). Convinced that she could land a role in one of Federico Fellini's films, Díaz travelled to Italy. There she succeeded in landing a role in La città delle donne (1980). There, she also aided Irene de Bari by arranging an interview with Fellini for her brother.

=== Television ===
On television, Diaz appeared in the short-lived 1975-76 CBS television series, Popi, which starred Hector Elizondo. Popi, which aired on CBS for eleven episodes, was one of the first television series on American network television to feature a Hispanic theme and cast. Her other television credits included guest roles on Emergency!,Quincy, M.E., Police Woman, St. Elsewhere, All in the Family, The F.B.I., Barney Miller and The Twilight Zone. In 1991, she played Desi Arnaz's mother, Dolores, in the television movie Lucy & Desi: Before the Laughter, on CBS. In the 1973 episode "A Bullet for El Diablo", on Hawaii Five-O, Diaz appeared in a dual role as half-sisters Rita Salazar and Maria Ramos.

=== Activism ===
Diaz co-founded the Screen Actors Guild Ethnic Minorities Committee in 1972 with Henry Darrow, Carmen Zapata and Ricardo Montalbán.

== Death ==
Edith Diaz died of heart failure on November 19, 2009, at a nursing home in North Hollywood, Los Angeles, at the age of 70. Actress Miluka Rivera, who had served with her on the SAG Ethnic Minorities Committee, called Diaz a "gifted performer, a union Latino rights activist and a loving friend."

== Filmography ==
Year	Title	Role	Notes
1971	Brute Corps	Lupe	
1975	Cage Without a Key	Angel Perez	
1989	Scenes from the Class Struggle in Beverly Hills	Rosa	
1989	Born on the Fourth of July	Madame - Villa Dulce	
1992	Sister Act	Choir Nun #11	
1993	Sister Act 2: Back in the Habit	Choir Nun #11	
1995	Nick of Time	Irene	
1995	Theodore Rex	Ella	
1996	The Fan	Elvira	
1998	Archibald the Rainbow Painter		
2003	First Watch	Linda	Video
2008	Oh Baby!	Yolanda at party	
