= Hank Garrett =

American actor

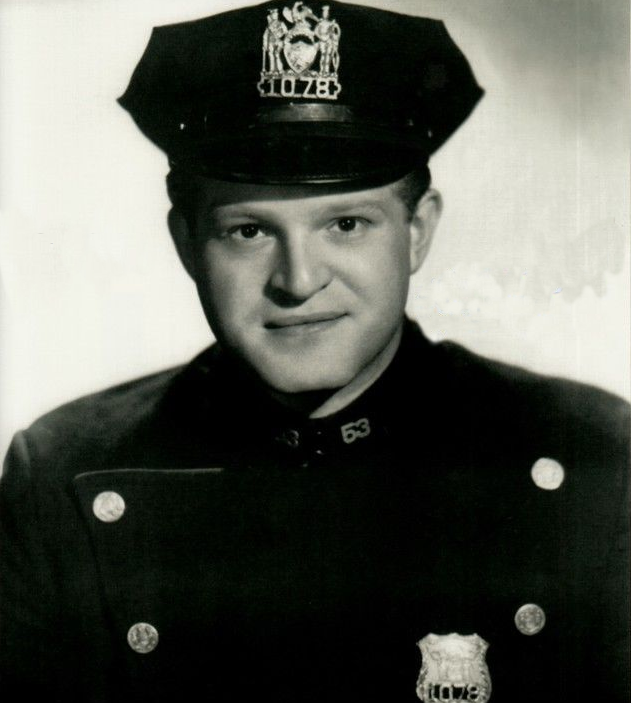
- Garrett in Car 54, Where are You?, 1961
- Born: Henry Greenberg Cohen Sandler Weinblatt; October 26, 1931 (age 95); Harlem, New York City
- Occupations: Actor; comedian; author; speaker; teacher; mixed martial artist; professional wrestler
- Years active: 1958–2018
- Spouses: Agnes Deangelis (m. 1963; div. 1979) Linda Garrett (m. 1982; div. 2008) Deanna Marie Smith (m. 2017)
- Parent(s): Ida and Sam Greenberg
- Website: hankgarrett.biz

Hank Garrett (born Henry Greenberg Cohen Sandler Weinblatt; October 26, 1931) is an American actor, comedian, author, speaker, teacher, mixed martial artist and retired professional wrestler best known for the television role of Officer Nicholson on Car 54, Where Are You?

== Early life and career ==
Garrett was born in Harlem, New York City, to Sam and Ida Greenberg, both Jewish Russian immigrants. His birth certificate lists his name as Henry Greenberg Cohen Sandler Weinblatt. Garrett began powerlifting, bodybuilding and karate as a means of self-protection in a rough neighborhood, starting at age 13. He was the 1958 winner of the Junior Olympic Powerlifting competition. This led to an extended stint (1957-66) in professional wrestling under the name of The Minnesota Farm Boy.

His mother was worried that he was on a path toward delinquency and had Willie Bryant and Sammy Davis Jr. talk to him, and they got him a job as a "band boy". He would set up the music stands for a band at shows, he was paid $50 for his first day of work. He later worked at the club owned by Larry Storch.

After several years in pro wrestling, Garrett turned to comedy and performed a regular stand-up routine in the Borscht Belt, in which he used episodes from his Harlem childhood years.

== Television career ==
As well as his regular role on Car 54, Where Are You?, Garrett has acted in a number of television productions. In 1963 he was one of the regulars on the children's comedy series Mack and Myer for Hire; several of the Car 54 actors based in New York also worked on this series.

Relocating to California, Garrett remained active in television, appearing in episodes of Dragnet, Kojak, Three's Company, The Dukes of Hazzard, Columbo, Knots Landing, Max Headroom, Santa Barbara, Airwolf, Knight Rider, and Alien Nation. Garrett is also known for his voiceover work on Garfield and GI Joe.

== Film career ==
Among Garrett's film credits are notable roles in Serpico, Three Days of the Condor, Death Wish, and The Sentinel. Garrett tends to be cast as the "heavy" in many roles.

He played the hitman disguised as a postman in Three Days of the Condor. During the filming, a clue was needed so that the Redford character would know that Garrett was not a real postman, and Redford thought of the idea to have Garrett wear his shoes. During the filming of the fight scene, Garrett broke Redford's nose. Garrett won the New York Film Critics’ Award for that role.

== Personal life ==
Garrett has been married three times. His first wife was Agnes Deangelis (1963-1979), his second was Linda Garrett (1982- 2008), and his third is Deanna Marie Smith (since July 23, 2017). He has two sons.

Garrett was active in philanthropic causes, and is on the Screen Actors Guild board. He lives in the San Fernando Valley and was last working on producing a one-man show.

== Awards ==
Garrett has also been recognized as an actor with a New York Film Critics' Award and a Lifetime Achievement Award, among other awards. In June 2009, he was inducted into the Professional Wrestling Hall of Fame. He was also inducted into the Martial Arts Hall of Fame.

== Selected filmography ==
- The Producers (1967) - Stagehand (uncredited)
- A Lovely Way to Die (1968) - Henderson (uncredited)
- Richard (1972) - Advisor
- Serpico (1973) - Malone
- Death Wish (1974) - Andrew McCabe
- Three Days of the Condor (1975) - Mailman
- Deadly Hero (1975) - Buckley
- The Sentinel (1977) - James Brenner
- Exorcist II: The Heretic (1977) - Conductor
- Firepower (1979) - Oscar Bailey
- The Amityville Horror (1979) - Bartender
- The Jazz Singer (1980) - Police Sergeant
- The Sting II (1983) - Cab Driver
- The Rosebud Beach Hotel (1984) - Kramer
- Johnny Dangerously (1984) - Mayor
- The Boys Next Door (1985) - Detective Ed Hanley
- Bad Guys (1986) - Bud Schultz
- Blood Frenzy (1987) - Dave Ash
- That's Adequate (1989) - Space Pilot
- Maniac Cop 2 (1990) - Tom O'Henton
- Steel and Lace (1991) - Capt. Grover
- Final Approach (1991) - RSO
- Guns and Lipstick (1995) - Foreman
- Fatal Choice (1995) - Lt. Hadcock
- Exit in Red (1996) - Dr. Wayland
- Nothing to Lose (1997) - Manny - the bartender
- Safe House (1998) - Hitman / Postman
- The Modern Adventures of Tom Sawyer (1998) - Police Chief
- Baby Geniuses (1999) - Guard
- The Million Dollar Kid (2000) - Delivery Dispatcher
- Moses: Fallen. In the City of Angels. (2005) - Lucky Palermo
