= Victor Alfieri =

American actor and writer (born 1971)

- Born: July 30, 1971 (age 53); Rome, Italy
- Occupation(s): Actor, writer
- Years active: 1992–present

Victor Alfieri (born July 30, 1971) is an American actor and writer, born in Italy and raised in the U.S.

== Biography ==
Alfieri was born in Rome and raised an only child by his mother and grandmother, spending summers working in the family's restaurant. Alfieri, a self-described 'class clown', created his own sketch comedy act to entertain friends.

At the age of 18, a photographer invited him to do an advertising shoot and soon he graced the covers of several Italian magazines, known as fotoromanzi. His modeling career was cut short, when during an encounter with three muggers his face was scarred by injuries requiring more than 56 stitches.

In 1991, Alfieri turned from modeling to join the Italian Police Force. He quit the force after two and a half years of service and, determined to start a career in Hollywood, Alfieri packed his bags and moved to Los Angeles, to the disbelief of his relatives back in Italy.

Alfieri quickly landed work as an actor, with various television spots and two contracts roles on daytime TV Days of Our Lives (1996–1998) and The Bold and the Beautiful (1999–2000, 2004, 2009).

Since leaving daytime television, Alfieri has appeared in American and international productions. He drew international attention for playing the handsome sensitive gigolo in The Roman Spring of Mrs. Stone (2003) (TV) opposite Helen Mirren and Anne Bancroft.

Internationally, Alfieri completed two high-profile European productions back-to-back. He played the lead role of Darius, the gladiator, in Pompeii (2007) (mini) an epic love story produced by DeAngelis Productions. Prior to that, he starred in the mini-series entitled Elisa di Rivombrosa (2003), a period piece based on the novel Pamela written by Samuel Richardson. Alfieri plays a sword-wielding assassin named Zanni La Morte.

Alfieri was next seen in a supporting role in THINKFilm's', My Sexiest Year (2007), a coming-of-age dramedy set in the 70s starring Frankie Muniz and Harvey Keitel. He portrays "Fabrizio Contini", a playboy who competes with Muniz for the affections of Amber Valletta.

I-See-You.Com (2006) saw Alfieri starring opposite Rosanna Arquette and Beau Bridges. Alfieri produced, wrote and directed his first short film which he is developing into a full-length feature. "J.E.S.", a horror/suspense/mystery that was shot in an ancient village outside Rome.

In 2009, Alfieri starred in A Secret Promise, which was re-released as My Secret Billionaire in 2021. The film is a love story shot in New York City, also starring Ione Skye, Ron Silver and Talia Shire. In 2009, Alfieri also had a minor role in the film Angels & Demons, as Carabinieri Lieutenant Valenti. Alfieri started his own production company, Black Knight Entertainment. In June 2010, he starred as Stefano D'Angelo in the Christopher McQuarrie NBC series Persons Unknown. He also starred on the NBC series Undercovers. In 2010–11, he starred as Victor Cifuentes in the popular series Southland. In May 2011, he produced, directed, and wrote his first feature. He starred as Razel in Danny Wilson's Nephilim.
