= Fake-Out =

- Directed by: Matt Cimber
- Written by: John F. Goff; Matt Cimber
- Produced by: Matt Cimber
- Starring: Telly Savalas; Pia Zadora; Desi Arnaz Jr.
- Cinematography: Eduard van der Enden
- Edited by: Brent A. Schoenfeld
- Music by: Arthur B. Rubinstein
- Production company: Par-Par Productions
- Distributed by: MNTEX Entertainment
- Release date: November 18, 1982
- Running time: 91 minutes
- Country: United States
- Language: English

Fake-Out (also released as Nevada Heat) is a 1982 American crime comedy film directed by Matt Cimber, written by Cimber and John F. Goff, and starring Pia Zadora, Telly Savalas, Desi Arnaz Jr., and Larry Storch.

== Cast ==
- Pia Zadora as Bobbie Warren
- Telly Savalas as Lt. Thurston
- Desi Arnaz Jr. as Det. Clint Morgan
- Larry Storch as Ted
- G. Wesley Stevens as Michelle
- George Savalas as Pit Boss
- Buddy Lester as Blackjack Player
- Sammy Shore as Waiter
- Nelson Sardelli as Danny Perelli
- George Buck Flower as Merrich
- Tim Rossovich as Roy
- Matt Cimber as Don
- Rusty Feuer as Happy Johnson
- Mercedes Hawthorne-Maharis as Warden Curtis
- Connie Hair as Roberta
- Meshulam Riklis as Spiveck
- Charlotte Laws as Sharon

== Production ==
The film was Pia Zadora's second lead role in a feature. All her first three starring roles in films were financed by the company of her then husband Meshulam Riklis (the others were Butterfly and The Lonely Lady). Matt Cimber, who directed Butterfly, also made Fake Out.

Zadora described it as "a cops-and-robbers-and-nightclub-singer story, kind of like a long Kojak." She added the film "has me singing a little, but it's nothing I'm terribly proud of."

The film was mostly shot on location in Las Vegas, principally around the hotel Riviera.
