= I-See-You.Com =

- Directed by: Eric Steven Stahl
- Written by: Eric Steven Stahl; Sean McLain
- Produced by: Eric Steven Stahl; Robert Egan; Hector Elizondo; Mirela Girardi; Mark Anthony Parrish
- Starring: Beau Bridges; Rosanna Arquette; Shiri Appleby; Dan Castellaneta; Victor Alfieri; Tracee Ellis Ross; Doris Roberts; Héctor Elizondo; Brittany Petros; Benton Jennings; Mary Hart; Lisa Joyner; Shea Curry; Garry Marshall; Don LaFontaine; Mark Anthony Parrish
- Cinematography: Ricardo Jacques Gale
- Edited by: Alexander Egan; Stefan Tellegino
- Music by: Kevin Kiner
- Release date: 2006
- Running time: 93 minutes
- Country: United States
- Language: English

I-See-You.Com is a 2006 comedy film directed and co-written by Eric Steven Stahl, starring Beau Bridges and Rosanna Arquette.

== Plot ==
Harvey Bellinger (Beau Bridges), his wife Lydia (Rosanna Arquette), and their two teenage kids live a well-to-do life in suburbia. This changes, however, when their seventeen-year-old son puts video cameras around their house, and starts to broadcast the family's actions live on the internet. When Harvey finds out about this, he is angry and appalled. But when he realizes that money can be made with the internet broadcasts, the Bellingers start acting crazier, eventually leading to Harvey blowing up the house to get rid of the cameras.

== Cast ==
- Beau Bridges as Harvey Bellinger
- Rosanna Arquette as Lydia Ann Layton
- Mathew Botuchis as Colby Allen
- Shiri Appleby as Randi Sommers
- Dan Castellaneta as Jim Orr
- Baelyn Neff as Audrey Bellinger
- Victor Alfieri as Ciro Menotti
- Tracee Ellis Ross as Nancy Tanaka
- Doris Roberts as Doris Bellinger
- Héctor Elizondo as Greg Rishwain
- Mark Anthony Parrish as Stud at talent agency
- Tiffany Baldwin as Jessica
- William Dixon as Todd
- Robert A. Egan as Kløsen Executive #1
- Jeff Halbleib as Kløsen Executive #2
- Brittany Petros as Kløsen Executive #3
- Benton Jennings as HR Executive
- Mary Hart as herself
- Lisa Joyner as herself
- Shea Curry as Chloe
- Garry Marshall as himself
- Don LaFontaine as himself

== Release ==
The film played at multiple film festivals. It was released on DVD in 2008.
