= Lady Cocoa =

1975 film by Matt Cimber

- Film poster
- Directed by: Matt Cimber
- Written by: Mikel Angel
- Produced by: Matt Cimber
- Starring: Lola Falana; Gene Washington; Millie Perkins; Alex Dreier; Joe Greene; James A. Watson Jr.
- Cinematography: Ken Gibb
- Edited by: Bud Warner
- Music by: Luchi De Jesus
- Distributed by: Dimension Pictures
- Release date: December 1975
- Running time: 93 minutes
- Country: United States
- Language: English

Lady Cocoa (also known as Pop Goes the Weasel) is a 1975 low-budget American blaxploitation crime drama that was directed by Matt Cimber. With Lola Falana in the title role, the film also featured Millie Perkins, Alex Dreier, Gene Washington and Joe Greene. It was released by Moonstone Entertainment, and written by George Theakos.

== Premise ==
The film tells the story of Coco who is released from jail for 24 hours prior to testifying against her ex-boyfriend Eddie and is placed in police protection for that timeframe.

== Cast ==
- Lola Falana as Coco
- Gene Washington as Doug
- Alex Dreier as Ramsey
- Millie Perkins as Marie
- Joe Greene as "Big" Joe
- James A. Watson Jr. as Eddie
- Matt Cimber as Arthur
- James R. Sweeney as Desk Sergeant
- George Buck Flower as Drunk Gambler
- John F. Goff as The Sicilian
- La Verne Watson as Eddie's Girl

== Reception ==
Linda Gross of the Los Angeles Times called Lady Cocoa "a slick, predictable, but well-made blaxploitation film." Joe Baltake, writing for the Philadelphia Daily News, complimented Lola Falana's performance but called the film "a flimsy, boring situation comedy," concluding: "It's dumb, but Lola makes it palatable."

== See also ==
- List of American films of 1975
