= Chandler (film) =

1971 American neo-noir film by Paul Magwood

- Directed by: Paul Magwood
- Screenplay by: John Sacret Young
- Story by: Paul Magwood
- Produced by: Michael Laughlin
- Starring: Warren Oates; Leslie Caron; Alex Dreier
- Cinematography: Alan Stensvold
- Edited by: William B. Gulick; Richard A. Harris
- Music by: George Romanis
- Distributed by: Metro-Goldwyn-Mayer
- Release date: December 1, 1971
- Running time: 85 minutes
- Country: United States
- Language: English

Chandler (also known as Open Shadow) is a 1971 American neo-noir film starring Warren Oates and Leslie Caron, who was married at the time to the film's producer Michael Laughlin. The picture was directed by Paul Magwood and based on a story of his own creation. Gloria Grahame and Scatman Crothers appear in cameo roles.

== Plot ==
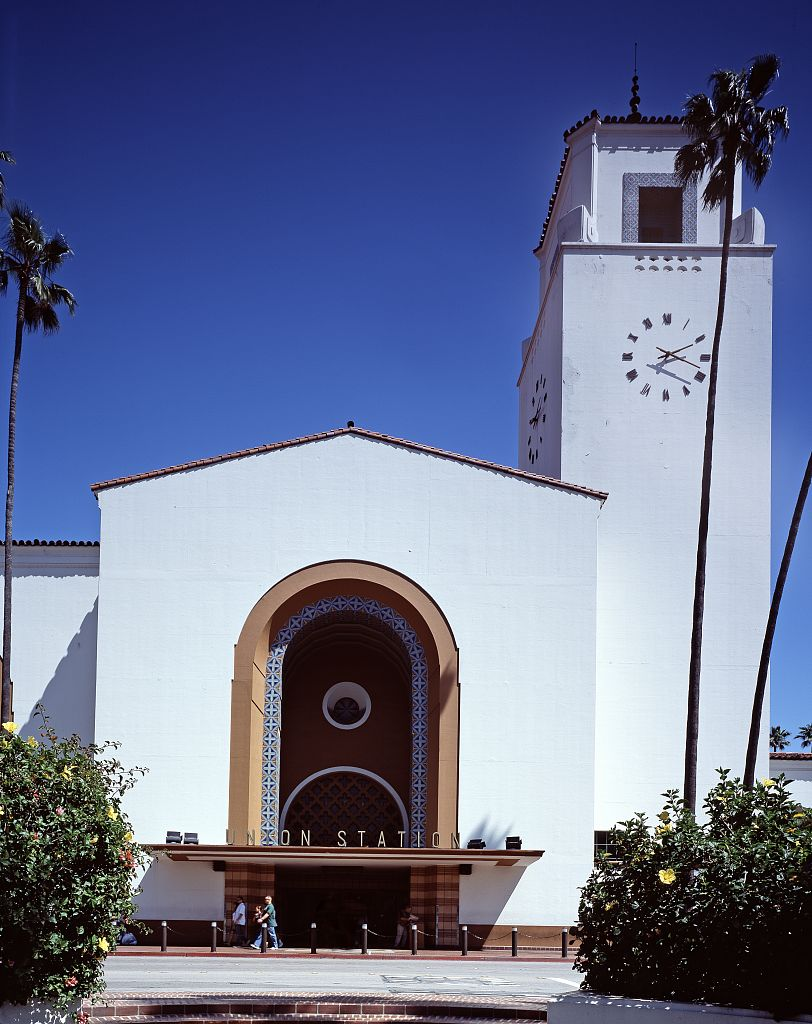
The story was filmed on location in Monterey and Los Angeles, California including Union Station

In a deliberate throwback to 1940s films noir, Chandler, a former private eye from that period, takes up his old work again, and finds himself constantly driving old cars. He is ostensibly hired by the government to protect a witness, Katherine Creighton, from a gangland leader, John Melchior, who wants to kill her. But Chandler is in fact working for a corrupt government agent, Ross J. Carmady, who is using him as a dupe so that Carmady can murder Melchior and put his own double agent at the top of the racket.

After quitting a position as a security guard, Chandler is offered a job by old friend Bernie Oakman, unaware that Bernie has been asked by Carmady to find a suitable patsy. Chandler gets his gun back from a pawn shop and follows the French woman Creighton from the moment of her arrival in Los Angeles. He becomes acquainted with her on a train to Monterey, California without revealing that he is tailing her, but soon intervenes when Creighton is assaulted and thrown into the trunk of a car.

Chandler becomes romantically involved with the woman, against his better judgment, repeatedly telling her, "You'll do." The two of them end up trapped near an isolated beach, ambushed by Carmady and his associate Kincaid, shooting it out.

== Cast ==
- Warren Oates as Chandler
- Leslie Caron as Katherine Creighton
- Alex Dreier as Ross J. Carmady
- Marianne McAndrew as Angel Carter
- Mitch Ryan as Charles "Chuck" Kincaid
- Gordon Pinsent as John Melchior
- Charles McGraw as Bernie Oakman
- Walter Burke as Zeno
- Richard Loo as Leo
- Gloria Grahame as Selma
- Scatman Crothers as Smoke

== Production ==
Producer Michael Laughlin and director Paul Magwood were irate at the involvement of MGM studio head James Thomas Aubrey, Jr. in the film's production. They went to the length of taking out a full page, black-bordered ad in the trade papers declaring:

Regarding what was our film Chandler, let's give credit where credit is due. We sadly acknowledge that all editing, post-production as well as additional scenes were executed by James T. Aubrey Jr. We are sorry.

The cutting was so severe and last minute that actors Royal Dano and James Sikking are still listed in the credits, even though their roles were completely removed.

== See also ==
- List of American films of 1971
- List of film noir titles
