= Popi (TV series) =

- Genre: Sitcom
- Starring: Héctor Elizondo
- Composer: Carlos Santana
- Country of origin: United States
- Original language: English
- No. of seasons: 1
- No. of episodes: 10

Production
- Running time: 30 minutes
- Production company: United Artists Television

Original release
- Network: CBS
- Release: January 20 – August 24, 1976

Popi is an American sitcom which aired on CBS from January 20, 1976, to August 24, 1976. The show, which ran for eleven episodes, was adapted from the 1969 film of the same name and was one of the first series on American network television to feature a Latino cast and theme. Popi starred actor Héctor Elizondo as a Puerto Rican widower, and Edith Diaz.

== Cast ==
- Héctor Elizondo as Abraham Rodriguez
- Edith Diaz as Lupe
- Anthony Perez as Junior Rodriguez
- Dennis Vasquez as Luis Rodriguez
- Lou Criscuolo as Maggio
