= James B. Sikking =

American actor (1934–2024)

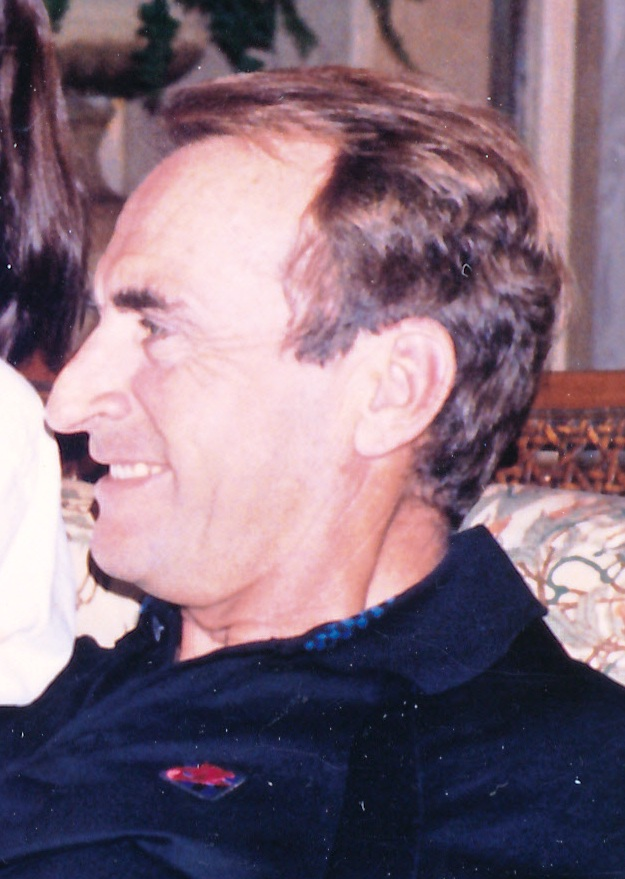
- Sikking at The Athenaeum Hotel in London, England
- Born: March 5, 1934; Los Angeles, California, U.S.
- Died: July 13, 2024 (aged 90); Los Angeles, California, U.S.
- Education: University of California, Los Angeles
- Occupation: Actor
- Years active: 1954–2012
- Spouse: Florine Caplan (m. 1962)
- Children: 3

James Barrie Sikking (March 5, 1934 – July 13, 2024) was an American actor, best known for his roles as Lt. Howard Hunter on the 1980s television series Hill Street Blues and Dr. David Howser on Doogie Howser, M.D. His career spanned six decades.

== Early life ==
James Barrie Sikking was born in Los Angeles on March 5, 1934, to Arthur and Sue (née Paxton) Sikking. Sikking was the youngest of five children. His mother co-founded Santa Monica, California's Unity-by-the-Sea Church. He attended El Segundo High School. Sikking graduated from University of California, Los Angeles in 1959. During his time at UCLA, he worked at the Central Stage, the production program at UCLA and Los Angeles County lifeguard to pay for college.

While in college during the Korean War, Sikking served in the U.S. Army. He stated he based his approach to his Hill Street Blues character on one of his drill sergeants from basic training at Fort Bragg.

== Career ==
=== Films ===
Sikking's first film was in Roger Corman's Five Guns West (1955) as a Union Sergeant uncredited. He was in The Strangler (1964), The Carpetbaggers (1964), Von Ryan's Express (1965), In Like Flint (1967), Point Blank (1967), the Elvis Presley film Charro! (1969), and Daddy's Gone A-Hunting (1969).

In the 1970s, Sikking was in Escape from the Planet of the Apes in an uncredited role (1971), Brother on the Run (1973), Capricorn One (1978), and The Electric Horseman (1979). In the 1980s, he was in The Star Chamber (1983), Up the Creek (1984), Star Trek III: The Search for Spock (1984), and Soul Man (1986).

In the 1990s, Sikking was in the remake Narrow Margin (1990) of 1956's The Narrow Margin, Final Approach (1991), The Pelican Brief (1993), and Whisper of the Heart (1995). In the 2000s he was in Made of Honor (2008).

=== Television ===
In the 1960s, Sikking was in a number of television series such as Assignment: Underwater, Honey West, and Hogan's Heroes. From 1971–76, he played Jim Hobart, an alcoholic surgeon, on the ABC Daytime soap opera General Hospital. In the 1970s, Sikking was in M*A*S*H, Rich Man, Poor Man Book II (1976) miniseries, and portrayed Geoffrey St. James on the NBC comedy series Turnabout.

Sikking appeared as Lieutenant (later demoted to Sergeant) Howard Hunter on the TV series Hill Street Blues from 1981 to 1987. Sikking's performance earned him his first Emmy nomination in 1984. In 1989, Hill Street Blues' creator, Steven Bochco, cast Sikking in the ABC television series Doogie Howser, M.D. as Dr. David Howser, father of the title character. On the 1997 drama series Brooklyn South he portrayed Captain Stan Jonas, for which he won a People's Choice Award in 1998. Sikking was in quite a few made-for-TV movies such as Inside O.U.T. (1971), The Alpha Caper (1973), Calling Doctor Storm, M. D. (1977), Bay Cove (1987), Ollie Hopnoodle's Haven of Bliss (1988), and Doing Time on Maple Drive (1992).

== Personal life and death ==
Sikking married his second wife, cookbook author Florine Sikking (née Caplan), in 1962. They had two children and four grandchildren. He and Robert Wagner were friends. Sikking enjoyed fishing. In the 1990s, he traveled to the Florida Keys to fish in the Redbone series of fishing tournaments. Sikking lived in the 4500 block of Wilshire Blvd. in Los Angeles.

Known affectionately as "Jim the Reader" at Los Angeles public schools, he read to public school third-grade classes for almost 20 years through the Screen Actors Guild (SAG) Book Pals Program. Sikking did charity work for golf tournaments. He was at the ribbon-cutting ceremony for a health center in Washington, Iowa.

Sikking died of complications from dementia at his home in Los Angeles, on July 13, 2024, at age 90.

== Filmography ==
=== Film ===
Year	Title	Role	Director	Notes	ref
1955	Five Guns West	Union Sergeant	Roger Corman	Western film Uncredited	
1964	The Strangler	Police Sketch Artist	Burt Topper	Psychological thriller film	
1964	The Carpetbaggers	Reporter	Edward Dmytryk	Drama film Uncredited	
1965	Von Ryan's Express	American Soldier	Mark Robson	World War II adventure film Uncredited	
1967	In Like Flint	Secret Service Member	Gordon Douglas	Spy fi comedy film Uncredited	
1967	Point Blank	Hired Gun	John Boorman	Crime film	
1969	Charro!	Gunner	Charles Marquis Warren	Western film	
1969	Daddy's Gone A-Hunting	Joe Menchell	Mark Robson	Thriller film	
1971	Escape from the Planet of the Apes	Control Room Officer	Don Taylor	Science fiction film Uncredited	
1971	Chandler	Bogardy	Paul Magwood	Neo-noir film Scenes deleted	
1971	The Night God Screamed	Deacon Paul	Lee Madden	Psychological thriller/horror film	
1972	The Magnificent Seven Ride!	Andy Hayes	George McCowan	Western film Also known as The Magnificent Seven 4	
1972	The New Centurions	Sgt. Anders	Richard Fleischer	Neo-noir action Crime film Based on the novel of the same name by Joseph Wambaugh	
1973	Scorpio	Harris	Michael Winner	Spy film	
1973	Brother on the Run	Lt. Summers	Edward J. Lakso; Herbert L. Strock	Action film Also known as Man on the Run, Soul Brothers Die Hard, & Black Force II	
1974	The Terminal Man	Ralph Friedman	Mike Hodges	Horror science fiction film Based novel of the same name by Michael Crichton	
1974	On Guard - Bunco!	Husband	James Tartan	Short film	
1978	Capricorn One	Control Room Man	Peter Hyams	Thriller film	
1979	The Electric Horseman	Dietrich	Sydney Pollack	Western film	
1980	Ordinary People	Ray	Robert Redford	Drama film Based on the 1976 novel by Judith Guest	
1980	The Competition	Brudenell	Joel Oliansky	Drama/musical film	
1981	Outland	Sergeant Montone	Peter Hyams	Science fiction/thriller film	
1983	The Star Chamber	Harold Lewin	Peter Hyams	Crime thriller film	
1984	Up the Creek	Tozer	Robert Butler	Comedy film	
1984	Star Trek III: The Search for Spock	Captain Styles	Leonard Nimoy	Science fiction film	
1985	Morons from Outer Space	Raymond Laribee	Mike Hodges	Comedy/Science fiction film	
1986	Soul Man	Bill Watson	Steve Miner	Comedy film	
1990	Narrow Margin	Nelson	Peter Hyams	Neo-noir action thriller film Remake of The Narrow Margin	
1991	Final Approach	Jason Halsey	Eric Steven Stahl	Thriller film	
1993	The Pelican Brief	Denton Voyles	Alan J. Pakula	Legal thriller film Based on the 1992 novel by John Grisham	
1994	Dead Badge	Wheeler, Aaron Feld	Douglas Barr	Action film	
1995	Whisper of the Heart	Seiya Tsukishima (voice)	Yoshifumi Kondō	Animated coming-of-age romantic drama film English dub	
2005	Fever Pitch	Doug Meeks	Peter and Bobby Farrelly	Romantic comedy-drama film Also known as The Perfect Catch	
2008	Made of Honor	Reverend Foote	Paul Weiland	Romantic comedy film	
2009	Wild About Harry	William Cauldicott	Gwen Wynne	Drama film Also known as American Primitive	
2012	Just an American	Dr. Hanover	Fred Ashman	Drama film	

=== Television ===
Year	Title	Role	Notes	ref
1961	Assignment: Underwater	Dave Quinto	Episode: "Anchor Man"	
1961	Perry Mason	Bert Springer	Episode: "The Case of the Misguided Missile"	
1963	Combat!	American POW Lyles	2 episodes Credited as Jim Sikking	
1963	Rawhide	Luke Harger	Episode: "Incident of the Travelin' Man"	
1963–64	The Outer Limits	Orderly; Botany	2 episodes	
1964–66	The Fugitive	Leonard Taft; Bert; Deputy Marsh	3 episodes	
1965–74	The F.B.I.	Various	11 episodes	
1965	The Loner	Confederate captain	Episode: "An Echo of Bugles"	
1965	O.K. Crackerby!	Mr. Joe Malone	Episode: "The Griffin Story"; Credited as Jim Sikking	
1965	The Long, Hot Summer	Doctor	Episode: "The Twisted Image, part 2"	
1965	The Virginian	Sanders	Episode: "Nobility of Kings"	
1965	Honey West	Valentine	Episode: "A Stitch in Crime"	
1965	My Favorite Martian	Aide	Episode: "Who's Got a Secret?"	
1965–66	My Mother the Car	Doctor; Sergeant Riddle	2 episodes	
1966	12 O'Clock High	Captain Rand	Episode: "Six Feet Under"	
1966–67	Run for Your Life	Doctor; Nugent	2 episodes	
1967	Sail to Glory	George Steers	Made-for-TV movie directed by Gerald Schnitzer	
1967	The Invaders	Capt. William Taft	Episode: "Valley of the Shadow"	
1967	Gomer Pyle - U.S.M.C.	Colonel Richardon	Episode: "The Show Must Go On"	
1967–68	Bonanza	Jack Rimbau; Kevin Maco	2 episodes	
1968	Adam-12	Tex	Episode: "Log 72: El Presidente"	
1968–70	Hogan's Heroes	Private Berger; Gestapo Officer; Hercules	3 episodes	
1969	The Survivors	Henson	Episode: "Chapter Ten"	
1969–70	Here Come the Brides	Capt. Hale; Jenkins	2 episodes	
1970	The Young Lawyers	Joe Daily	Episode: "The Two Dollar Thing"	
1970	Love, American Style	Leonard	Episode: "Love and the Intruder/Love and the Lost Dog"	
1970–71	Night Gallery	1st Reporter; State Trooper	2 episodes	
1970–72	Mission: Impossible	Corrigan; Wilson	2 episodes	
1970–73	The Doris Day Show	Horace Bowers; Fred Sutton; Detective Charles	3 episodes	
1970–73	The Mod Squad	Political Science Professor; Major Bernard; Dr. Webber	3 episodes	
1970–73	Mannix	Mark Langdon; Sketchley	2 episodes	
1971	The Bold Ones: The New Doctors	1st Reporter	Episode: "A Matter of Priorities"	
1971	The Immortal	Administrator	Episode: "My Brother's Keeper"	
1971	The Name of the Game	Police Lieutenant	Episode: "Beware of the Watchdog"	
1971	Inside O.U.T.	Patrolman	Made-for-TV movie directed by Reza Badiyi	
1971	Cade's County	Harold Hopkins	Episode: "Safe Deposit"	
1971	Ironside	Voice Print Officer Jay"	Episode: "Dear Fran..."	
1971	Longstreet	Lt. Madison	Episode: "There Was a Crooked Man"	
1972	Gidget Gets Married	Jim Johnson	Made-for-TV movie directed by E.W. Swackhamer	
1972	The Astronaut	Astronaut Higgins	Made-for-TV movie directed by Robert Michael Lewis	
1972	Man on a String	Pipe Smoker	Made-for-TV movie directed by Joseph Sargent	
1972	The Bob Newhart Show	Dick	Episode: "Goodnight Nancy"	
1972	Family Flight	Second Controller	Made-for-TV movie directed by Marvin J. Chomsky	
1972	Banyon	Andrews	Episode: "The Lady Killer"	
1972–73	The Rookies	Defense Attorney; Captain Gentry	Episodes: "The Informant"; "Cauldron"	
1972–73	Room 222	Albert Kramer	2 episodes	
1973–76	General Hospital	Dr. James "Jim" Hobart	Series regular	
1973	M*A*S*H	Finance Officer	Episode: "Tuttle"	
1973	The Streets of San Francisco	Major Frank Kramer, U.S. Army Doctor	Episode: "Act of Duty"	
1973	Search	Callas	Episode: "Moment of Madness"	
1973	Coffee, Tea, or Me	Businessman	Made-for-TV movie directed by Norman Panama	
1973	The Alpha Caper	Henry Kellner	Made-for-TV movie directed by Robert Michael Lewis	
1973	The President's Plane Is Missing	Dunbar's Aide	Made-for-TV movie directed by Daryl Duke	
1973	The Six Million Dollar Man: The Solid Gold Kidnapping	2nd OSO Agent	Made-for-TV movie directed by Russ Mayberry	
1973	Outrage	Officer Geary	Made-for-TV movie directed by Richard T. Heffron	
1974	Columbo	Policeman	Episode: "Publish or Perish"; uncredited	
1974	The F.B.I. Story: The FBI Versus Alvin Karpis, Public Enemy Number One	New Orleans SAC	Made-for-TV movie directed by Marvin J. Chomsky	
1974	Cannon	Clint	Episode: "The Sounds of Silence"	
1976	Ellery Queen	Mike Hewitt	Episode: "The Adventure of Sinister Scenario"	
1976	The Feather & Father Gang	Bricklaw	Episode: "The Two Star Killer"	
1976	Rich Man, Poor Man Book II	Matthew Downey	Miniseries – 2 ep directed by: Karen Arthur; Ted Post	
1977	Police Story	Harris	Episode: "The Malflores"	
1977	Little House on the Prairie	Mr. Franklin	Episode: "To Live with Fear"	
1977	Delvecchio	Ned Wagner	3 episodes	
1977	Eight Is Enough	Mr. French	Episode: "Pieces of Eight"	
1977	The Feather & Father Gang	Bricklaw	Episode: "Never Con a Killer"; Intended as the series pilot	
1977	Man From Atlantis	Colonel Manzone	Episode: "Killer Spores"	
1977	Calling Doctor Storm, M. D.	Bart Burton	Made-for-TV movie directed by James Burrows	
1977	Rafferty	Guest	Episode: "No Yesterday and No Tomorrow"; Unaired as series was canceled	
1977	Young Joe, the Forgotten Kennedy	Commander Devril	Made-for-TV movie directed by Richard T. Heffron	
1977	Kill Me If You Can	Mr. Lea	Made-for-TV movie directed by Buzz Kulik	
1977	The Last Hurrah	Monsignor Killian	Made-for-TV movie directed by Vincent Sherman	
1977–78	The Rockford Files	John Hicklin; Jeff Seales	2 episodes	
1977–78	Hawaii Five-O	George Cameron; Oscar Ross	2 episodes	
1977–79	Charlie's Angels	Fritch; Lawrence Wellman	2 episodes	
1978	Starsky and Hutch	Ted Dermott	Episode: "The Action"	
1978	The Bionic Woman	Ray Burns	Episode: "Which One Is Jamie?"	
1978	The Incredible Hulk	Cliff McConnell	Episode: "The Waterfrony Story"	
1978	Operation Petticoat	Lt. O'Reilly	Episode: "Cram Course"	
1978	Lucan	Jerry Hultz	Episode: "Brother Wolf"	
1978	A Woman Called Moses	McCracken	Miniseries – 2 episodes directed by Paul Wendkos	
1979	Turnabout	Geoffrey St. James	Miniseries – 4 episodes directed by: Richard Crenna; Alex March; Tony Mordente	
1979	The Misadventures of Sheriff Lobo	Jack Willey	Episode: "The Senator Votes Absentee"	
1979	Paris	Lew Castle	Episode: "Burnout"	
1980	Trouble in High Timber Country	Roger Lomax	Made-for-TV movie directed by Vincent Sherman	
1981–87	Hill Street Blues	Howard Hunter	Series regular; 144 episodes	
1984	The Jesse Owens Story	Avery Brundage	Made-for-TV movie directed by Richard Irving	
1984	Battle of the Network Stars XVII	Himself	Aired December 20, 1984	
1985	First Steps	Jim Davis	Made-for-TV movie biographical drama film directed by Sheldon Larry	
1986	Dress Gray	Major Clifford Bassett	Miniseries – directed by Glenn Jordan	
1986	L.A. Law	Party Guest	Episode: "Pilot"; uncredited	
1987	Police Story: The Freeway Killings	Mayor Cameron	Made-for-TV movie directed by William A. Graham	
1987	Who's the Boss?	Cornelius	Episode: "Mona"	
1987	Bay Cove	Nicholas Kline	Made-for-TV movie directed by Carl Schenkel	
1988	Ollie Hopnoodle's Haven of Bliss	Old Man	Made-for-TV movie directed by Dick Bartlett	
1988	CBS Summer Playhouse	Lindsey	Episode: "Mad Avenue"	
1988	Tales from the Hollywood Hills: Golden Land	Ira Sternholt	Made-for-TV movie directed by Gene Reynolds	
1988	Too Good to Be True	Russell Quinton	Made-for-TV movie directed by Christian I. Nyby II; Remake of Leave Her to Heaven	
1989	Brotherhood of the Rose	Felix	Miniseries directed by Marvin J. Chomsky	
1989	Hunter	Jack Small	Episode: "City Under Siege"; Parts1–3	
1989	Around the World in 80 Days	Jenks	3 episodes	
1989	The Final Days	Elliot Richardson	Made-for-TV movie directed by Richard Pearce	
1989	Desperado: Badlands Justice	Kirby Clark	Made-for-TV movie directed by E.W. Swackhamer	
1989–93	Doogie Howser, M.D.	Dr. David Howser	Series regular	
1990	Cop Rock	Howard Hunter	Episode: "Cop-a-Felliac"; uncredited	
1992	Doing Time on Maple Drive	Phil Carter	Made-for-TV movie directed by Ken Olin	
1994	Seduced by Evil	Nick Lindsay	Made-for-TV movie directed by Tony Wharmby	
1995	Jake Lassiter: Justice on the Bayou	Dr. Roger Salisbury	Made-for-TV movie directed by Peter Markle	
1995	In Pursuit of Honor	Douglas MacArthur	Made-for-TV movie directed by Ken Olin	
1995	Tyson	Bill Clayton	Made-for-TV movie directed by Uli Edel	
1995	Dare to Love	Ron Wells	Made-for-TV movie directed by Armand Mastroianni	
1996	Duckman: Private Dick/Family Man	James Madison (voice)	Episode: "The Once and Future Duck"	
1996	The Ring	Sam Liebmam	Made-for-TV movie directed by Armand Mastroianni	
1997	Aaahh!!! Real Monsters	Dr. Carson (voice)	Episode: "Nuclear and Present Danger"	
1997–98	Brooklyn South	Captain Stan Jonas	Series regular; 20 episodes	
1998	Invasion America	General Gordon (voice)	13 episodes	
1999	Mutiny	Lt. Cmdr. Tynan	Made-for-TV movie directed by Kevin Hooks	
1999–2000	Batman Beyond	Harry Caulder, Foreman (voice)	2 episodes	
2000	Nowhere to Land	George Eller	Made-for-TV movie directed by Armand Mastroianni	
2000	Rocket Power	Vice Principal Healy (voice)	2 episodes	
2001	Submerged	Cyrus Cole	Made-for-TV movie directed by James Keach	
2000–01	The Guardian	Bill Magnee; Bill McGee	2 episodes	
2004	Curb Your Enthusiasm	Jim Remington	2 episodes	
2012	The Closer	Edward Crosby	Episode: "Hostile Witness"	
