= A Time to Die (1982 film) =

- Original movie poster
- Directed by: Matt Cimber; Joe Tornatore
- Screenplay by: John F. Goff; Matt Cimber; Willy Russell
- Based on: Six Graves to Munich by Mario Puzo
- Produced by: Charles Lee
- Starring: Rex Harrison; Rod Taylor; Edward Albert; Raf Vallone; Linn Stokke
- Cinematography: Tom Denove; Eddy van der Enden
- Edited by: Fred A. Chulack
- Music by: Robert O. Ragland; Ennio Morricone
- Production company: Carnation International Pictures (CIP)
- Distributed by: Almi Group
- Release date: 1982
- Running time: 91 minutes
- Country: U.S.
- Language: English

A Time to Die or Seven Graves for Rogan is a 1982 war-drama-criminal film directed by Matt Cimber and Joe Tornatore and starring Edward Albert, Rex Harrison (in his final film appearance), and Rod Taylor. An alternate title was Seven Lives for Rogan.

The film was based on Mario Puzo's 1967 novel Six Graves to Munich, which was an expansion of the original 1965 eponymous short story. It was shot in 1979. The producer had additional scenes written and shot without the involvement of the original writer and director. Additional music for the film score was by Ennio Morricone. The film was produced by Charles Lee.

== Plot ==
A World War II vet, former U.S. Intelligence officer Michael Rogan, sets out in 1948 to avenge the death of his wife and unborn child at the hands of Nazis and his own torture and botched execution. His targets are four Germans, a Sicilian, and a Hungarian who committed the atrocities. He travels to Hamburg, Berlin, Sicily, Budapest, and Munich to seek out his torturers. American intelligence agent Jack Bailey tracks his every move.

== Cast ==
- Edward Albert as Michael Rogan
- Rex Harrison as Claus Van Osten
- Rod Taylor as Jack Bailey
- Raf Vallone as Genco Bari
- Linn Stokke as Dora
- Rijk de Gooyer as SS-officer
- Lucie Visser as Mrs. Rogan

== Production ==
A Time to Die was based on the 1967 novel Six Graves to Munich by Mario Puzo under the pseudonym Mario Cleri. Puzo had expanded the original 1965 eponymous short story published in Male magazine in the November issue.

Amsterdam, Holland was the principal filming location. The film was produced by Carnation International Pictures (CIP). The Almi Group was the distribution company.

The film marked the final feature film appearance of Sir Rex Harrison. After the filming, Harrison retired from film and returned to the stage for remainder of his life.
