= Single Room Furnished =

1968 film by Matt Cimber

- Directed by: Matt Cimber (as "Matteo Ottavio")
- Screenplay by: Gerald Sanford; Matt Cimber; Michael Musto
- Based on: play Single Room Furnished by Gerald Sanford
- Produced by: Michael Musto; Hugo Grimaldi
- Starring: Jayne Mansfield; Dorothy Keller; Fabian Dean; Billy M. Greene
- Cinematography: László Kovács
- Edited by: Hugo Grimaldi
- Music by: James Sheldon
- Distributed by: Crown International Pictures
- Release date: 1968
- Running time: 93 min.
- Country: United States
- Language: English

Single Room Furnished is a 1968 drama film starring Jayne Mansfield. The film is based on the stage play of the same title by Gerald Sanford, adapted by Mansfield's third husband, Matt Cimber, who also directed (credited on-screen as "Matteo Ottaviano"). The screenplay is by Michael Musto.

== Plot ==
Pop is the janitor of a downtown New York City apartment building. While changing the lights in the hall, he overhears an argument coming from an apartment. The argument is between a young woman named Maria and her Italian mother, who is concerned that her daughter is bringing shame to the family name by associating with Eileen, a tenant in the building who works as a prostitute. After storming out of the apartment, Maria encounters Pop, who begins to calm her down. The two eventually go into the building's kitchen to talk. Maria admits her admiration for Eileen's beauty and supposedly exciting lifestyle.

Pop then begins to tell Maria the story of Johnnie, a young woman who used to live in the building with her husband Frankie about ten years earlier. Frankie was unhappy with his life, leaving Johnnie, who was pregnant with their baby, to feel isolated. One day, Frankie mentioned an old friend whom he had recently seen. This old friend was in the Navy, and was traveling all over the world. Frankie was fascinated with Navy life and the prospects it could bring to him. Johnnie realized that Frankie desired to leave her for a better life and tried to change the subject. Weeks later, Johnnie woke one morning to find that Frankie had left her and their unborn baby. Maria asks what happened to the baby and Pop says that Johnnie had a miscarriage. He also adds that Johnnie eventually changed her name to Mae and moved on with her life. However, she remained a tenant in the building.

While discussing Mae, Pop mentions another couple who live in the building, Flo and Charley. Charley was friends with Mae, who visited him one morning to announce that she was pregnant. Mae planned on putting the baby up for adoption once it was born. Charley, feeling sorry for Mae, asked her to marry him. Days later, Flo met Charley in a bar. Eventually, Charley realized that he loved Flo and that he could not marry Mae just because he felt sorry for her. He then asked Flo to marry him. As Pop finishes narrating the story to Maria, Flo comes into the kitchen; she is pregnant with Charley's baby. Flo explains that while she and Charley got married, Mae had her baby and put it up for adoption. Flo also elucidates that Mae, like she had done before, changed her name, this time to Eileen. Maria then realizes that her friend Eileen is the subject of the stories she has been told.

Flo tells Maria about Eileen, who works as a prostitute at a nearby club. One night, she arrives to her apartment to find her lover Billy waiting for her. Billy is a sailor and is in love with Eileen, although she does not reciprocate this feeling. While she removes her makeup and undresses, Billy professes his desire to marry her, stating that he does not care about her past. She interjects by informing him of the many men she has been with and the things she has done with them, before then reflecting of a time when she was in love with a man whom she planned to marry. However, he was killed in an accident before their wedding. Billy still expresses his wish to marry her and while doing so, accidentally breaks a porcelain doll given to her by the man she once loved. Eileen becomes hostile towards Billy, and begins mocking him, saying that she would never marry him and that she would never love him. Billy incidentally brandishes a gun and points it at Eileen, to which she tells him to go ahead and shoot. Billy, not being able to shoot her, leaves the room and ultimately kills himself. Eileen, at first in a state of shock, sits down at her mirror and begins re-applying her makeup.

== Cast ==
- Jayne Mansfield as Johnnie/Mae/Eileen
- Dorothy Keller as Flo
- Fabian Dean as Charley
- Billy M. Greene as Pop
- Terri Messina as Maria
- Martin Horsey as Frankie
- Walter Gregg as Billy
- Velia Del Greco as Maria's mother
