= Cinema Digital Sound =

Surround sound format used for theatrical films

- Abbreviation: CDS
- Formation: 1990
- Type: Surround sound
- Location: United States
- Owner: Eastman Kodak
- Website: Web-converted version of original CDS brochure

Cinema Digital Sound (CDS) was a multi-channel surround sound format used for theatrical films in the early 1990s. The system was developed by Eastman Kodak and Optical Radiation Corporation. CDS was quickly superseded by Digital Theatre Systems (DTS) and Dolby Digital formats.

CDS replaced the analogue audio tracks on 35 mm and 70 mm film prints with 5.1 discrete audio. The 5.1 tracks were encoded using 16-bit PCM audio in a delta modulation compression which resulted in a compression level of 4:1. The audio channels in CDS were arranged in the same way that most current 5.1 systems with Left, Center, Right, Left Surround, Right Surround and LFE. Dick Tracy (1990) was the first film encoded with CDS. Not all films with CDS soundtracks used all 5.1 channels; some, such as Edward Scissorhands (1990), used only the 4 channels that were supported by Dolby Stereo. Universal Soldier (1992) was the last film encoded with CDS.

The digital information was printed on the film, similar to Dolby Digital and SDDS. However, unlike those formats, there was no analog optical backup in 35 mm and no magnetic backup in 70 mm, meaning that if the digital information were damaged in some way, there would be no sound at all. This was one of the factors that contributed to its inevitable demise; the then-new Dolby Digital format moved its information to another area (in between the film sprocket holes), preserving the optical tracks.

== Development and technical aspects ==
Prior to the development of Cinema Digital Sound, a six-track, optically read, sound-on-film system using PCM digital encoding was thought, by most in the industry, to be impractical. However, in a joint effort over a three-year period, and with a $5 million total investment, Kodak developed a special fine-grained, high-resolution negative film capable of holding more information than previous films and Optical Radiation Corporation developed a special audio coding and error correction system, resulting in the Cinema Digital Sound system.

Initial tests proved that packing densities necessary to achieve high-fidelity digital sound and error rates comparable to the Compact Disc format were possible using Kodak's new high-resolution negative film and that wear on the film during normal playback was not significant. In a controversial move (ORC's engineers fought against it but management overruled them), it was decided to utilize the area typically reserved for sound in the 35 mm optical and 70 mm magnetic film standards, for the new CDS digital audio and data tracks. Six audio channels were implemented; Five full-bandwidth audio channels (three behind screen and two surround channels) were applied to the input of the system as linear 16-bit samples at a 44.1 kHz sample rate. Samples were data compressed into 12-bit words via Delta-Modulation, with one in every 32 samples retaining its original linear 16-bit form to provide an accurate reference every 726μm. The subwoofer (.1 Low Frequency Effects) channel did not employ Delta-Modulation. Instead the 44.1 kHz sample rate was decreased to 1378 Hz, which yielded an upper audio bandwidth of 114 Hz with anti-aliasing and anti-imaging strategies applied in the remainder of the frequency range.

In addition to the six digital audio channels, three data/control channels were provided. One SMPTE time code channel and another channel for MIDI control signals offered flexibility for performing theater automation or external synchronization of equipment. The third data channel, an identification track, could be used to record a variety of user-defined parameters specific to the film (such as curtain opening/closing, seat movement or lighting effects.) As the CDS system was available for only two years before its complete withdrawal from the market, no use of the SMPTE time code or MIDI channels was ever implemented.

Because the data rate was 5.8 million bits-per-second (5.8mbp/s), significant error detection and correction was required. A custom designed Reed-Solomon block code, was used with additional CRC characters for error correction. Interleaving of odd and even audio samples was performed to protect against burst errors. Just as in audio tape machines, transport problems with tension, guides, and supply and take-up reels could result in vertical or horizontal weave, and as bit sizes were only 14μm, precise timing and tracking was essential, thus the CDS system required installation of special projector modifications to smooth the film path travel and steady the take-up speed. It was found later, however, that modifications to the projectors were not needed and that the CDS systems sensitivity to improper film speed was due to a diode installed incorrectly in the CDS decoder module. Horizontal tracking was provided by a 76-MHz digital servo, while vertical timing was accomplished with an algorithm written into the data format itself. Rows of data were scanned horizontally, thus a self-clocking run-length-limited code was used for this error correction. A 6-to-8-bit mapping was performed upon encoding to ensure that each 8-bit word contained exactly four ones. This form of parity worked well in correcting errors upon decoding.

== Films distributed with CDS ==
- Dick Tracy (1990) (Buena Vista Pictures)
- Days of Thunder (1990) (Paramount Pictures)
- Flatliners (1990) (Columbia Pictures)
- Edward Scissorhands (1990) (20th Century Fox)
- The Doors (1991) (Carolco Pictures)
- Hudson Hawk (1991) (TriStar Pictures)
- Terminator 2: Judgment Day (1991) (Carolco)
- For the Boys (1991) (20th Century Fox)
- Final Approach (1991) (Trimark Pictures)
- Universal Soldier (1992) (Carolco)
