= Blood Frenzy =

- Directed by: Hal Freeman
- Screenplay by: Ted Newsom
- Story by: Ray Dennis Steckler
- Starring: Lisa Loring
- Distributed by: Hollywood Family Video
- Release date: 1987
- Country: United States
- Language: English
- Budget: $100,000

Blood Frenzy is a 1987 American slasher film directed by Hal Freeman, and starring Lisa Loring amongst others.

== Plot ==
A young boy plays with a jack-in-the-box, then is beaten by his alcoholic father. The boy murders his father with a garden trowel. The blood splatters onto the jack-in-the-box, which he returns to playing with.

Psychiatrist Dr Barbara Shelley takes her five patients; PTSD-suffering Vietnam veteran Rick, nymphomaniac Cassie, haphephobic Jean, alcoholic Stan Crawford, aggressive Dory, and hostile Dave Ash, on a camping trip for a therapy session. She believes the isolated location will help them open up to each other, without the distractions of civilization. On Dory’s suggestion they drive to a spot in the desert, near an abandoned mine.

As they set up camp, Rick stays in the RV. He feels they are being watched, but chalks it up to his paranoia. During a group therapy session, Dave accuses Dory of being a lesbian, and she in turn accuses him of being a repressed homosexual. Rick breaks up the fight, then experiences a flashback, revealing he was the only survivor of his platoon. Dr Shelley ends the therapy session.

Dave scares Rick, and the two fight, leading to Rick cutting Dave with a knife. As Dr Shelley tends to Dave’s wounds, Rick goes for a walk. Cassie tans in a bikini, and tries seducing Rick, who rebuffs her advances. He explores the old mine, finding a box of dynamite. Heading back to the RV, he hears the jack-in-the-box tune. During another therapy session, Jean accepts a hug from Crawford.

Dave sneaks into Cassie’s tent, and the two have sex. Later that night, an unknown man enters Dave’s tent and slits his throat with a knife. As he leaves, he plays the jack-in-the-box tune. In the morning, the others find Dave’s body, and discover that the RV has been sabotaged. They think Rick is the killer, as he had a weapon and motive. Rick dispels their notions, then suggests hiding Dave’s body under the RV to prevent it from rotting in the sun. As Rick cleans up in the RV, Cassie seduces him, and the two have sex.

In the main tent, Dory accuses the others of possibly being the killer, but Dr Shelley fires back that Dory picked the location, so she could be involved. Crawford suggests going for help, and Rick pairs everyone off. Dr Shelley and Dory remain at camp, with Rick and Cassie heading west, and Crawford and Jean heading east. Dr Shelley gets the feeling she is being watched, though Dory dismisses her. Cassie collapses from heatstroke, so Rick carries her back to camp.

Jean and Crawford find the mine, and Crawford takes a rest. Jean explores the mine, and has her throat slit. Crawford finds the jack-in-the-box, but is stabbed repeatedly by the killer, managing to make it back to the RV with the jack-in-the-box before dying of his injuries.

Dr Shelley explains that the killer is Lonnie Talbot. He was found standing over his father’s body holding the jack-in-the-box. Her father was the one who admitted him to the mental hospital. When his case came up for review, she said he was still insane, and should be kept in the hospital. Rick returns to the spot he found in the mine, taking the dynamite.

In the morning, Rick apparently suffers a mental break, and commits suicide with the dynamite out of survivor’s guilt. As Dr Shelley stays at camp, Dory leads a traumatized Cassie into the mine. She seduces her, before she and Lonnie tie her to a table. Cassie is tortured to death with a knife by Lonnie.

Dr Shelley arrives at the mine, having heard Cassie’s screams. Lonnie is revealed to be Dory’s brother. Dory was really the child from the opening. Another flashback shows that Dory killed their father and gave Lonnie the jack-in-the-box. Dory helped Lonnie escape, and picked the location so they could get revenge on Dr Shelley, killing the others because of their flaws.

Dory and Lonnie menace Dr Shelley, but Rick saves her, having faked his death using Ash’s body to lure out the killer. Dr Shelley fights with Dory, and stabs her in the throat. Rick kills Lonnie by impaling him with a signpost. Dory revives and tries killing Dr Shelley, but Rick kills Dory by throwing a pickax into her back. Rick and Dr Shelley make their way back to the RV.

== Cast ==
- Wendy MacDonald as Dr. Barbara Shelley
- Tony Montero as Rick Carlson
- Lisa Loring as Dory
- Lisa Savage as Cassie
- Hank Garrett as Dave Ash
- Monica Silveria as Jean
- John Clark as Crawford
- Chuck Rhae as Lonnie
- J'aime Cohen as Little Dory
- Carl Tignino as Dory's father
- Eddie Laufer as Little Lonnie

== Production ==
The film was based on a script by Ray Dennis Steckler called Warning - No Trespassing. Ted Newsom was hired to rewrite by Hal Freeman, who had made a lot of money making pornographic films and wanted to expand into other genres. Newsom made the script a cross between Ten Little Indians and Friday the 13th. He says Freeman financed the film entirely himself.

Newsom wrote the film to be shot half on location and half in a studio but it ended up being shot entirely on location over two weeks. The film unit was based out of Barstow in California.

== Release and canceled sequel ==
The film was released on video.

Newsom wrote a follow-up for Freeman called Judgment Night about a convicted murderer who escapes prison and seeks revenge. Freeman died before it was made.
