= Alex Dreier =

American reporter (1916–2000)

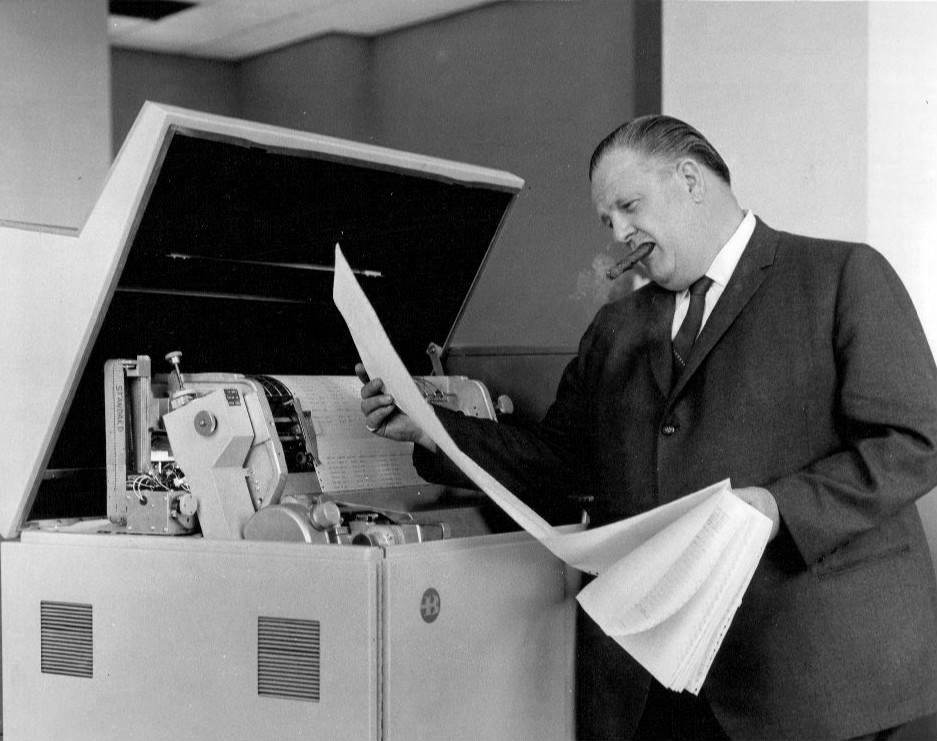
- Dreier in 1964
- Born: Alexander McDuff Dreier; June 26, 1916; Honolulu, Hawaii, U.S.
- Died: March 11, 2000 (aged 83); Rancho Mirage, California, U.S.
- Occupations: Broadcaster; actor
- Years active: 1968-1979

Alexander McDuff Dreier (June 26, 1916 – March 11, 2000) was an American news reporter and commentator who worked with NBC Radio during the 1940s, and later with the ABC Information Radio Network in the 1960s and early 1970s. Dreier then became an actor and appeared in a number of TV series and films.

== Early years ==
Dreier was born in Honolulu, Hawaii, attended Stanford University, and graduated in 1939. He then went into journalism, and was covering Berlin for United Press when he joined NBC in 1941. During his year in Berlin he was under surveillance by the Gestapo, and he left the city one day before the Pearl Harbor attack.

His commentary aired on NBC on Saturdays from 1942 to 1945 and weekdays from 1951 to 1956. Known as Chicago's "Man on the Go," Dreier was the city's top TV anchor during his years on NBC-owned WNBQ-TV, serving as a news reporter and anchor. He also handled news for NBC-TV's Today on the Farm from 1960–61. He was replaced as WMAQ anchor by Floyd Kalber in 1962; he then moved to ABC owned-and-operated WBKB-TV.

From 1959 to 1964, Dreier also co-hosted the television program Championship Bridge with Charles Goren. These can still be seen on the Arts Channel of TV4U.com.

== Later years ==
(left to right) Alex Dreier, Bob Hope, Anne T. Hill, Geraldine Dreier, Roy W. Hill at a fund raiser for Eisenhower Medical Center ca 1975

Dreier moved to California in 1967, where he worked in Los Angeles for KTTV and also began a career as an actor in many films such as The Boston Strangler (1968), Chandler (1971), The Carey Treatment (1972), The Loners (1972), Lady Cocoa (1975) and The Astral Factor (1978), and TV shows, including Mannix, Kojak, Land of the Giants, Hart to Hart and Love, American Style between 1968 and 1979. He served as chairman of the board for the Annenberg Center for Health Sciences and as a board member of Shimer College and the Eisenhower Medical Center. and the Eisenhower Medical Center. In 1989, he was inducted into the Illinois Broadcasters Hall of Fame.

== Death ==
Dreier died on March 11, 2000, in Rancho Mirage, California. He is buried in Desert Memorial Park in Cathedral City, California.

== Filmography ==
Year	Title	Role	Notes
1941	Here Comes Mr. Jordan	Radio Announcer	Uncredited
1968	The Boston Strangler	News Commentator	
1971	Chandler	Ross J. Carmady	
1972	The Carey Treatment	Dr. Joshua Randall	
1972	The Loners	Police Chief Peters	
1975	Lady Cocoa	Ramsey	
1975	Alias Big Cherry		
1978	The Astral Factor	Dr. Ulmer	
