= Safe House (1998 film) =

1998 American film

- DVD cover
- Written by: Eric Steven Stahl; John Schalter; Sean McLain
- Directed by: Eric Steven Stahl
- Starring: Patrick Stewart; Kimberly Williams; Héctor Elizondo
- Music by: Kevin Kiner
- Country of origin: United States
- Original language: English

Production
- Producers: Sean McLain; Eric Steven Stahl
- Cinematography: Vincent Donohue
- Editor: Liza McDonald
- Running time: 112 minutes

Original release
- Network: Showtime
- Release: October 15, 1998

Safe House is a 1998 American independent action thriller film directed by Eric Steven Stahl and starring Patrick Stewart, Kimberly Williams, and Héctor Elizondo. It premiered in the United Kingdom in late 1998 on Channel 5 and in the United States on Showtime on January 24, 1999.

== Plot ==
Mace Sowell is a retired DIA agent who believes his life is in danger from his former boss, Admiral Thomas Michelmore, who is now running for President of the United States. Mace has information about the underhand dealings of his erstwhile boss at the DIA which would ruin his Presidential campaign if it ever was released into the public domain. The information is located in cyberspace and is scheduled to be sent to every major newspaper in the western world unless Mace reprograms the mail server remotely from his computer every 24 hours using a special password only he knows. To complicate the issue, Mace is in the early stages of Alzheimer's disease and has difficulty in convincing people his information is not paranoia as a result of his condition. He only leaves his home in disguise and visits his psychiatrist Dr. Simon under duress from his daughter Michelle, who threatens to have his mental competency evaluated. Because Mace never discussed his career in the DIA with his family and also because paranoia is a common symptom of Alzheimer's disease, Mace is unable to convince Simon or Michelle of the truth of the threat he faces. Simon suggests to Michelle that she either hire an in-home caregiver for Mace or have him committed if his behavior becomes too much to handle. Following a difficult search, Michelle hires Andi Travers, whom Mace is immediately hostile toward. Their relationship is fraught at first as she tries to convert Mace to a macrobiotic diet, and Andi in turn is angered by Mace's invasion of her privacy as part of his background check, which arouses no suspicion.

Mace has few friends apart from Stu, a man who cleans his pool and does other odd jobs for him. Stu tells Andi that he has known Mace since before the onset of his mental degeneration. Amongst the jobs Stu carries out for Mace are drills — training exercises whereby Stu dresses up in quasi-military gear and balaclavas and simulates breaking into Mace's house and attacking him. Stu does this more out of friendship and lack of anything better to do than because he believes Mace's claims about being under threat. During one such drill, Andi mistakes Stu for a genuine burglar and severely injures him with a golf club. Andi earns Mace's gratitude by covering the incident from Michelle during a phone call. Although Mace and Andi begin to get along, Mace strains Michelle's patience when he stages a car bomb removal in her van, and she disallows further drills. After Mace accuses Andi and Stu of conspiring against him in abiding by this request, they attempt to cheer Mace up with a final drill, but his subpar performance seems to prove that he is no longer able to fend for himself.

Mace allows himself to be more dependent on Andi, but does not let go of the notion that Michelmore is making an attempt on his life, which results in him shooting at a neighbor's incoming car. This incident convinces Michelle to remove all weapons from Mace's home and to file a competency hearing. Faced with commitment, Mace reveals to Andi his information on Michelmore and the secret of his dead man's switch, and bribes her into aiding in his escape from the country. That night, Mace finds Andi attempting to abort the dead man's switch, and trails her to her home the next morning. Sneaking inside, Mace discovers that Andi is an agent of Michelmore. Back at his own home, Mace expresses admiration to Andi for being able to fool even him. As Andi shoots and kills a passing Stu, Mace pulls a hidden gun from beneath the kitchen sink and shoots her, but is wounded himself in the process. In his last act of clarity, Mace sets off the dead man's switch and calls to report Andi's dead body, but finds that he is unable to remember his own name.

== Cast ==
- Patrick Stewart as Mace Sowell
- Kimberly Williams as Andi Travers
- Héctor Elizondo as Dr. Simon
- Joy Kilpatrick as Michelle Sowell-Ross
- Craig Shoemaker as Stuart Bittenbinder
- James Harlow as Marc Ross
- Richard Livingston as Admiral Thomas Michelmore
- Julia Vera as Teresa
- Brenda Klemme as Asthma Girl Interviewee
- Robert Lee Barry as Rocket Scientist Interviewee
- Scott Zacky as Wise Guy Interviewee
- Wayne Demaline as Butch the Redneck Interviewee
- Hank Garrett as Hitman/Postman

== Development ==
Safe House was announced as a film as early as 1996. Stewart was brought on to portray Mace Sowell, a role that required he work out to portray a retired DIA agent. He had initially turned down the role to perform in an extended run of The Tempest, however took the role after the producers promised to postpone filming for him. Stewart prepared for the role by studying Alzheimer's and spending time with doctors and caregivers, later telling the producers "You've taken away my peace of mind forever." Filming for Safe House took place around 1996.

== Release ==
Safe House premiered in the United Kingdom in October 1998 on Channel 5. The following year the movie aired in the United States on Showtime on January 24, 1999.

== Reception ==
Critical reception for Safe House has been favorable. A reviewer for the TVData Features Syndicate praised Stewart's performance, calling it "a labor of love". Daryl H. Miller of The Los Angeles Times was also favorable, citing the choice to initially leave Sowell's claims of DIA employment as potentially false as a highlight.

Nathan Rabin reviewed the movie for The A.V. Club, criticizing it as having an inconsistent tone and making "Alzheimer's disease seem like nothing more than a cheap and manipulative attempt to inject some sort of gravity into an otherwise featherweight film."
