= The Witch Who Came from the Sea =

1976 film by Matt Cimber

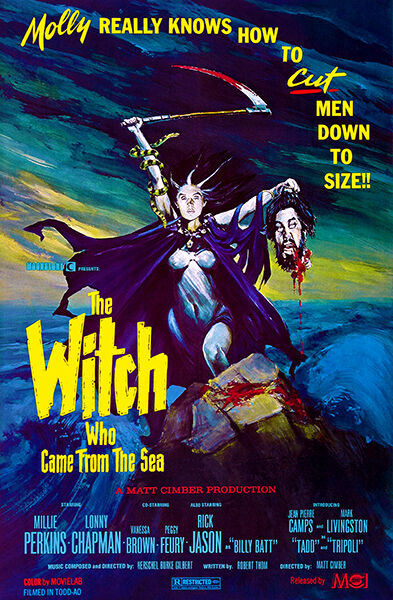
- Theatrical release poster
- Directed by: Matt Cimber
- Written by: Robert Thom
- Produced by: Matt Cimber
- Starring: Millie Perkins; Lonny Chapman; Vanessa Brown; Peggy Feury; Rick Jason; Jean Pierre Camps; Mark Livingston
- Cinematography: Ken Gibb
- Edited by: Bud Warner
- Music by: Herschel Burke Gilbert
- Production company: Saiko
- Distributed by: MCI
- Release date: March 1, 1976 (United States)
- Running time: 83 minutes 88 minutes (UK uncut version)
- Country: United States
- Language: English

The Witch Who Came from the Sea is a 1976 American psychological horror film produced and directed by Matt Cimber and starring Millie Perkins, Lonny Chapman, Vanessa Brown, Peggy Feury, Rick Jason, George Buck Flower, and Roberta Collins. The film centers on Molly, an emotionally scarred woman who goes on a killing spree after taking a job as a waitress in a seaside bar. Its title refers to The Birth of Venus, which figures in the film. Dean Cundey served as associate photographer on the film.

The Witch Who Came from the Sea was classified as a "video nasty" by the United Kingdom Department of Public Prosecutions and was considered prosecutable for violating obscenity laws, but the prosecution proved unsuccessful. Retrospective reviews of the film have been generally positive.

== Plot ==
Molly is a troubled alcoholic woman living in the Venice Beach neighborhood of Los Angeles. She is obsessed with television and idolizes the memory of her sea captain father, who was allegedly lost at sea during her childhood. Her sister, Cathy, is candid about her disgust for their abusive father, but Molly deludedly tells romanticized stories about him to her nephews, Tadd and Tripoli.

Molly departs for her shift as a bartender at a seaside tavern run by a man named Long John, who is also her lover. However, she first meets with two famous football players, Sam Walters and Austin Slade, in a hotel room, with whom she engages in a sadomasochistic threesome. She ties both men to the bed before placing gags in their mouths, and proceeds to castrate them with a straight razor before killing them. After committing the murders, Molly arrives for her bartending shift and is nearly three hours late, which Long John chastises her for; however, he is reluctant to fire her as the bar is short-staffed.

Later, Molly meets aging television star Billy Batt at a party, and the two discuss a print of The Birth of Venus on the wall. They go to a room to have sex, but Molly inexplicably becomes enraged, breaking his wrist before ranting incoherently about her father, who she says "died for love." Their fight escalates and is overheard by party guests, and Billy throws Molly out of the room onto the ground. Unaware of what occurred, Long John and the other partygoers accuse Billy of abusing her; Molly has no recollection of the incident.

Molly goes and sees Jack Dracula, a tattoo artist near the boardwalk who gives her a tattoo of a mermaid on her abdomen. After, she phones Alexander McPeak, another actor she met at the party, who expressed romantic interest in her despite his relationship with his neurotic girlfriend, a starlet named Clarissa Jenks. The next morning, an enraged Clarissa fires a gun into the tires of Alexander's car, and is charged with assault with a deadly weapon. Detectives question Alexander about Clarissa, suspecting she may be responsible for the recent murders of Sam and Austin. Meanwhile, Cathy becomes suspicious of Molly after learning that the clothing found stuffed in the men's mouths resembles clothing owned by Molly.

Alexander and Molly have an affair, and Molly brutally slashes his throat with a razor before castrating him in his bathroom. The next morning, Long John awakens to find Molly lying in bed beside him, nude and covered in blood. She claims the blood is her own, and that she hurt herself while drunk the night before. She later admits to Long John and Doris, her co-worker, that her father died of a heart attack while raping her, and that she blames herself for his death. She also admits to the murders. Moments later, Tadd and Tripoli arrive, insisting they visit their aunt Molly, whom they have not seen for an extended period. The three visit briefly, but the children are unaware that Molly is overdosing on sleeping pills. As the police arrive to arrest her, she envisions herself drifting alone aboard a raft on the sea.

== Cast ==
- Millie Perkins as Molly
  - Verkina Flower as Young Molly
- Lonny Chapman as Long John
- Vanessa Brown as Cathy
- Peggy Feury as Doris
- Jean Pierre Camps as Tadd
- Mark Livingston as Tripoli
- Rick Jason as Billy Batt
- Stafford Morgan as Alexander McPeak
- Richard Kennedy as Detective Beardsley
- George Buck Flower as Detective Stone
- Roberta Collins as Clarissa Jenks
- Stan Ross as Jack Dracula
- Gene Rutherford as Sam Walters
- Jim Sims as Austin Slade
- John F. Goff as Molly's Father

== Production ==
The film was written by Robert Thom, actress Millie Perkins' then-husband, who was undergoing extensive medical care at the time. Thom's hospital bills had become a financial burden for the couple, so Thom devised the screenplay for the film, for Perkins to star. The screenplay was composed of elements from both Perkins' and Thom's own lives (Perkins's father was a merchant marine), and Perkins' sister was upset about the film as she feared it would tarnish their father's honor.

== Censorship ==
In 1983, the United Kingdom Department of Public Prosecutions compiled a list of 72 video releases that were not brought before the BBFC for certification and declared them prosecutable for obscenity. This list of "video nasties" included The Witch Who Came from the Sea, but it was in the sub-group of 33 titles that were unsuccessfully prosecuted and was soon dropped from the DPP list. In the United Kingdom, the film was eventually released completely uncut in 2006 with a complete running time of 87 minutes 43 seconds.

== Release ==
=== Home media ===
The film was released on DVD by Subversive Cinema on December 21, 2004. Subversive Cinema later re-released the film on August 17, 2007, as a part of its 2-disk Grindhouse Classics double feature. On May 20, 2014, it was released by Cinema Epoch. It was released for the first time on Blu-ray by Arrow Films on December 5, 2017. Arrow also released the film on DVD that same day.

== Reception ==
On the review aggregator website Rotten Tomatoes, the film holds an approval rating of 75% based on eight reviews, with a weighted average rating of 5.8/10.

Film critic Mark Kermode recommended the film as one of the best video nasties of the era. Brett Gallman, in his review of the film for Oh, the Horror, wrote, "For all its glib asides, The Witch Who Came from the Sea leaves the haunting image of a woman undone by a world that never lived up to the fantasies inside of her television set." Casey Scott from DVD Drive-in called the film "an unsung psychological gem" among 1970s exploitation films. Chris Coffel of Bloody Disgusting gave the film a score of four out of five, writing, "The Witch Who Came from the Sea is a movie people need to see. Again it's not horror in the typical sense, though it was a video nasty, but it is without question horrific. And despite it's [sic] grim nature, the film is quite beautiful thanks to the DP work of the legendary Dean Cundey." Todd Martin of HorrorNews.net called the film "a hidden gem", praising its bleak tone and Perkins' performance.

== See also ==
- Cult film
- Rape and revenge films
- The similarly named The Sailor Who Fell from Grace with the Sea, a 1976 British film with Kris Kristofferson, based on the 1963 novel by Yukio Mishima which features treachery, mutilation and death in a sexually charged setting by the sea.
