= Lucie Visser =

Dutch former model and actress (born 1958)

- Born: Lucienne Stella Visser; 18 February 1958 (age 68); The Hague, Netherlands
- Years active: 1976–1989

Lucie Visser (born 18 February 1958 in The Hague) is a Dutch former model and actress who was elected Miss Netherlands in 1976.

Visser's career began aged 15 when she participated in an election for finest European Model in Capri. She finished third, and met the photographer David Hamilton, who took her to Saint-Tropez. Visser's breakthrough came on May 14, 1976, in Zandvoort where she won the Miss Netherlands title. A month later, in the elections for Miss Europe held in Rhodes, she came third again, but decided not to take part in the international contests that year. The runner-up, Nanny Nielen, took her place.

As a result of her fame as a model, Visser played a number of film roles. In June 1987 and December 1989 she posed in the Dutch edition of Playboy.

== Filmography ==
| Year | Title | Role | Notes |
|---|---|---|---|
| 1975 | Rooie Sien | | Uncredited |
| 1976 | Body of My Enemy | | |
| 1977 | Dokter Vlimmen | | |
| 1978 | The Unicorn | Orli Laks | |
| 1981 | Het verboden bacchanaal | Jeanette Toebosch | |
| 1982 | A Time to Die | Mrs. Rogan | |
