= The Alpha Caper =

- Also known as: The Inside Job
- Genre: Crime; Thriller; Drama
- Written by: Elroy Schwartz
- Directed by: Robert Michael Lewis
- Starring: Henry Fonda; Leonard Nimoy; Larry Hagman
- Music by: Oliver Nelson
- Country of origin: United States
- Original language: English

Production
- Executive producer: Harve Bennett
- Producer: Aubrey Schenck
- Production locations: Universal Studios - 100 Universal City Plaza, Universal City, California
- Cinematography: Enzo Martinelli
- Editor: Les Green
- Running time: 85 minutes
- Production companies: Universal Television; Silverton Productions

Original release
- Network: ABC
- Release: October 6, 1973

The Alpha Caper (also known as The Inside Job) is a 1973 American made-for-television crime thriller film directed by Robert Michael Lewis. It stars Henry Fonda as an embittered parole officer forced into early retirement, who decides to take revenge against the city officials by stealing a gold shipment being moved to a new depository. The television film was the final production of producer Aubrey Schenck and was a television pilot for an American television series called Crime.

== Cast ==
- Henry Fonda as Mark Forbes
- Leonard Nimoy as Mitch
- James McEachin as Scat
- Larry Hagman as Tudor
- Elena Verdugo as Hilda
- John Marley as Lee Saunders
- Noah Beery, Jr. as Harry Balsam
- Paul Kent as John Woodbury
- James B. Sikking as Henry Kellner
- Vic Tayback as Policeman #1
- Kenneth Tobey as Police Captain

== See also ==
- List of American films of 1973
