= The Black Six =

- Directed by: Matt Cimber
- Written by: George Theakos
- Produced by: George Theakos; Matt Cimber; Jefferson Richard
- Starring: Gene Washington; Carl Eller; Lem Barney; Mercury Morris; Willie Lanier; Joe Greene
- Cinematography: William Swenning
- Edited by: Robert Carlson
- Music by: David Moscoe
- Distributed by: Cinemation Industries
- Release date: March 13, 1974
- Running time: 94 min
- Country: United States
- Language: English

The Black Six is a 1974 American blaxploitation and outlaw biker film written by George Theakos and directed by Matt Cimber. It starred several National Football League stars in the title roles. It was one of the first all-black biker films.

== Plot ==
The plot involves Bubba Daniels, an African American veteran of the Vietnam War who returns home to find that his brother Eddie has been killed. The killing was done by a white supremacist motorcycle gang, led by Moose King, who objected to the fact that Eddie had been dating Moose King’s sister Jenny. Bubba and his motorcycle gang, known as the Black Six, vow to avenge Eddie's death. The Six encounter a number of obstacles, including hostile motorcycle gangs (particularly Moose's), and racist policemen. The movie climaxes with an inconclusive battle royal between the Six and Moose's Caucasian-supremacist biker gang, in which an opposing gang member (apparently) blows them and himself up by igniting the gas tank of his own motorcycle. The film concludes with the caption "Honky, look out...Hassle a brother, and the Black 6 will return!".

== Cast ==
The titular "Black Six" was played by six then-current National Football League stars:

- Gene Washington, a wide receiver with the San Francisco 49ers as Bubba Daniels
- Joe "Mean Joe" Greene, a defensive tackle with the Pittsburgh Steelers as Kevin Washington
- Eugene "Mercury" Morris, a running back with the Miami Dolphins as Bookie Garrett
- Lemuel "Lem" Barney, a cornerback with the Detroit Lions as French LaBoise
- Willie Lanier, a linebacker with the Kansas City Chiefs as Tommy Bunka
- Carl Eller, a defensive end with the Minnesota Vikings as Jr. Brother Williams

The players' teams appeared with the actors' names in the film's credits. In addition, the cast includes Ben Davidson, who had recently retired from football, as Thor, a member of a motorcycle gang opposing the Black Six. Maury Wills, a recently retired Major League Baseball star, also has a role in the film as Coach Edwards. The film also stars Robert Howard as Eddie Daniels, Cindy Daly as Jenny King and professional football player John Isenbarger as Moose King.

Washington was given the lead role due to him having previous acting experience; he and several other cast members (many of whom did more acting afterwards, most notably Greene in a now-famous commercial for Coca-Cola) later criticized how poorly the script had been written. All six protagonists (as well as Davidson and Isenbarger) were All-Pro, while Greene, Barney, Lanier and Eller have since been inducted into the Pro Football Hall of Fame.

== Production ==
The film was shot on location in Frazier Park, California. Several of the football players were disappointed with elements in the original script, especially that the black motorcyclists would be killed in the end, despite the fact that they stood for truth, justice and the American way. As a result of their protests, an inconclusive ending was shot.

== DVD ==
The Black Six was released on DVD on October 12, 2004.

== See also ==
- List of American films of 1974
