= Vanessa Brown =

Austrian-born American actress

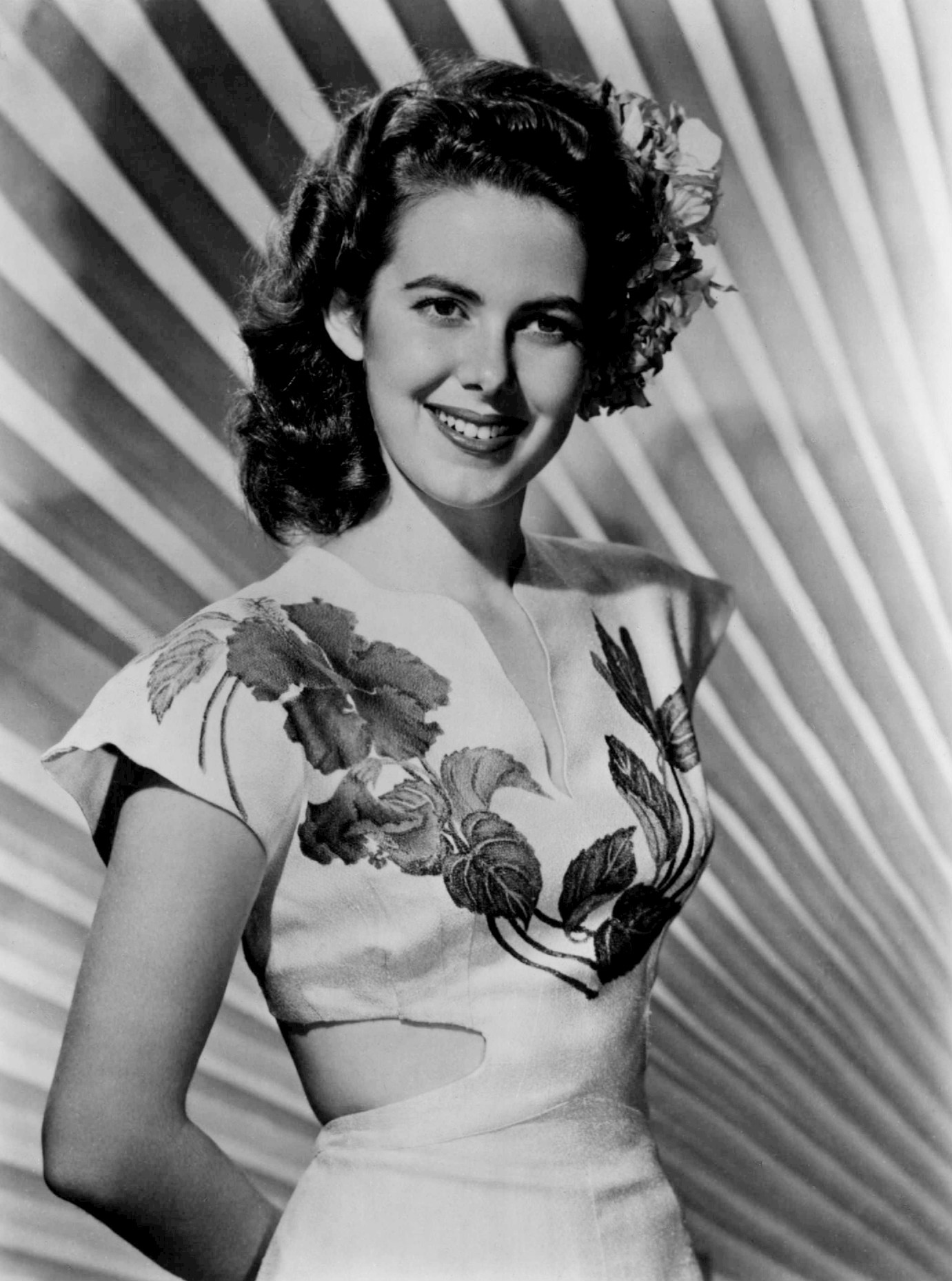
- Brown in 1951
- Born: Smylla Brind; March 24, 1928; Vienna, Austria
- Died: May 21, 1999 (aged 71); Los Angeles, California, U.S.
- Occupation: Actress
- Years active: 1944–1991
- Spouses: Robert Alan Franklyn (m. 1950; div. 1957) Mark Sandrich Jr. (m. 1959; div. 1989)
- Children: 2

Vanessa Brown (born Smylla Brind, March 24, 1928 – May 21, 1999) was an Austrian-born American actress who worked in radio, film, theater, and television.

== Early life ==
Born in Vienna, Austria, to Jewish parents (Nah Brind, a language teacher, and Anna Brind, a psychologist), Brown and her family fled to Paris, France, in 1937 to escape persecution by the Nazi regime.

Within a few years, the family had settled in America, and Brown auditioned for Lillian Hellman for a role in Watch on the Rhine. Fluent in several languages, the youngster impressed Hellman, and she was signed as understudy to Ann Blyth, eventually doing the role of Babette on Broadway and in the touring production. In high school, she wrote and directed school plays. She graduated from University of California, Los Angeles in 1949, having majored in English. While there, she was movie critic and feature writer for the Daily Bruin, the campus newspaper.

== Career ==
=== Radio ===
Brown's IQ of 165 led to two years of work as one of the young panelists on the radio series Quiz Kids. She specialized in literature and language. In her adult years, she had an interview program on the Voice of America.

She was heard on Lux Radio Theatre, Skippy Hollywood Theatre, NBC University Theatre, and Theatre Guild on the Air.

=== Film ===
Brown was a junior member of the National Board of Review, the critical panel serving the motion picture industry. RKO Radio Pictures brought her family to Los Angeles, and Brown made her film debut (as Tessa Brind) in Youth Runs Wild (1944). RKO changed her screen name to Vanessa Brown and assigned her to a series of ingenue roles over the next few years. In the late 1940s, she was featured in The Late George Apley (1947), The Ghost and Mrs. Muir (1947) as Mrs. Muir's grown daughter Anna, Big Jack (1949; Wallace Beery's last movie), The Heiress (1949) and other films. She was the eighth actress to play the role of Jane, appearing in Tarzan and the Slave Girl (1950) opposite Lex Barker, followed by a role in Vincente Minnelli's The Bad and the Beautiful (1952). Her last film appearance was playing Millie Perkins's sister in the horror film The Witch Who Came from the Sea (1976).

=== Television ===
In the 1950s, Brown was a regular panelist on I'll Buy That on CBS. She acted in live television dramas of the early 1950s, including Robert Montgomery Presents and The Philco Television Playhouse, and she appeared on Pantomime Quiz and Leave It to the Girls. She later appeared on the television series The Wonder Years and Murder, She Wrote. She played the title role on the television series Wagon Train S1E28 "The Sally Potter Story", airing April 9, 1958, where her love interest was a young Martin Milner. She had a guest appearance on Perry Mason as Donna Kress in the episode "The Case of Paul Drake's Dilemma" (1959).One Step Beyond, The Lovers . .

=== Stage ===
Back on Broadway, she originated the role of "The Girl" in The Seven Year Itch, the character portrayed by Marilyn Monroe in the 1955 film version. She continued to do much television through the 1950s, and was one of the narrators of the United World Federalists documentary Eight Steps to Peace (1957), along with Vincent Price and Robert Ryan.

Brown ventured into writing for the stage. She was the author of Europa and the Bull, based on the legend of Europa.

=== Painting ===
In 1959, Brown was described in a newspaper article as "a promising artist whose oil paintings hang in the homes of top film colony personalities." She signed her paintings with her birth name, Smylla. A gallery in Beverly Hills, California held a one-woman show of her work in 1958.

=== Music ===
In 1952, composer Bernie Wayne wrote the much-covered song "Vanessa" about her.

== Personal life and political views ==
Brown was married to Dr. Robert Alan Franklyn, a plastic surgeon, from 1950 to 1957. In 1959, she married television director Mark Sandrich Jr. – son of director Mark Sandrich – and they had two children, David Michael and Cathy Lisa.

Upon her death, she was cremated and her ashes returned to her son, David.

Brown has two stars on the Hollywood Walk of Fame, a motion pictures star at 1621 Vine Street and a television star at 6528 Hollywood Boulevard.

Brown was active in the Democratic Party, serving as a delegate to the party's national convention in 1956. In 1962, she was a member of a committee that promoted a write-in campaign for Adlai Stevenson as governor of California.

== Works ==
=== Filmography ===
Year	Title	Role	Notes
1944	Youth Runs Wild	Sarah Taylor	
1945	The Girl of the Limberlost	Helen Brownlee	
1946	Margie	Wanda	Uncredited
1946	I've Always Loved You	Georgette 'Porgy' Sampter at 17	
1947	The Late George Apley	Agnes Willing	
1947	The Ghost and Mrs. Muir	Anna Muir as an Adult	
1947	Mother Wore Tights	Bessie	
1947	The Foxes of Harrow	Aurore D'Arceneaux	
1949	Big Jack	Patricia Mahoney	
1949	The Secret of St. Ives	Floria Gilchrist	
1949	The Heiress	Maria	
1950	Tarzan and the Slave Girl	Jane	
1950	Three Husbands	Mary Whittaker	
1951	The Basketball Fix	Pat Judd	
1952	The Fighter	Kathy	
1952	The Bad and the Beautiful	Kay Amiel	
1967	Rosie!	Edith Shaw	
1971	Bless the Beasts and Children	Mrs. Goodenow	
1976	The Witch Who Came From the Sea	Cathy	

=== Radio appearances ===
Year	Program	Episode/source
1946	Hollywood Star Time	The Song of Bernadette
1957	Suspense	Episode 107 – The Vanishing Lady
