= Six Graves to Munich =

Mario Puzo novel

- U.S. first edition cover
- Author: Mario Puzo
- Language: English
- Subject: Crime novel
- Publisher: Banner Books
- Publication date: 1967
- Publication place: United States
- Media type: Print
- Pages: 128

Six Graves to Munich is a novel by Mario Puzo, written under the pseudonym Mario Cleri, published in October, 1967. The novel is an expansion of an eponymous short story or novella which appeared in the November, 1965 issue of Male magazine.

The book follows the main character, Michael Rogan, a former American World War II intelligence agent who is captured and tortured by the Gestapo. He survives his attempted execution then returns to post-war Germany 10 years after the war to seek revenge on seven members of the Gestapo who attempted to kill him.

The book was made into a movie in 1982 as A Time to Die starring Rex Harrison, Rod Taylor, and Edward Albert, Jr.

== Plot ==
Michael Rogan is an American intelligence agent parachuted into France before the D-Day landing in 1944. He is captured by German forces and taken to the Munich Palace of Justice.

Rogan was interrogated and tortured by seven Axis agents.

He survives his ordeal, plotting revenge. He then exacts vengeance on his torturers: Moltke, Pfann, Hans and Eric Freisling, Geno Bari, Pajerski, and Claus von Osteen.

== Reception ==
The novel was a pulp fiction work written when Puzo was an Associate Editor and writer for men's magazines in the 1960s. The book was republished in 2010 by New American Library (NAL) in the U.S. and by Quercus in the UK and an audio book was released by Recorded Books read by Firdous Bamji.

Reviews of the republication of the book have been generally positive. The book has been translated in several languages including Russian, German, Spanish, Turkish, Portuguese, Dutch, Slovak, Vietnamese, Bengali, Lithuanian, Czech, Bulgarian, and Polish.

== Sources ==
- Ciccone, Nancy. "Puzo's Spy and Compensatory Justice." Reading: A Journal for Scholars and Readers. Volume 2 (2016), Issue 1.
- Gino, Carol. Me and Mario: Love, Power & Writing with Mario Puzo, author of The Godfather. Aaha! Books. 2018.
- Moore, M.J. Mario Puzo: An American Writer's Quest. Heliotrope Books, New York, 2019.
