= Lonny Chapman =

American actor (1920–2007)

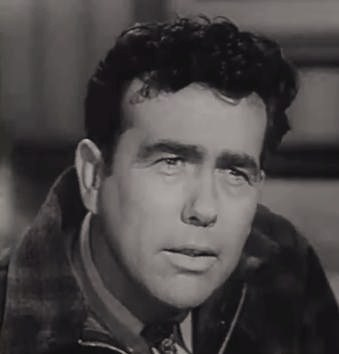
- Chapman in 1961
- Born: Lon Leonard Chapman; October 1, 1920; Tulsa, Oklahoma, U.S.
- Died: October 12, 2007 (aged 87); North Hollywood, California, U.S.
- Education: Joplin Junior College; University of Oklahoma (BFA)
- Occupations: Actor, playwright
- Years active: 1951–2001
- Spouse: Erma Dean (m. 1944)
- Children: 2

Lon Leonard Chapman (October 1, 1920 – October 12, 2007) was an American actor best known for his numerous guest star appearances on television drama series.

== Early years ==
Chapman was the son of Elmer and Eunice Chapman. He was born on October 1, 1920, in Tulsa, Oklahoma, and subsequently lived in Joplin, Missouri. He graduated from Joplin High School and, in 1940, from Joplin Junior College. He enlisted in the United States Marine Corps the day after the attack on Pearl Harbor and served in the South Pacific during World War II. He served for five years. In 1947, Chapman graduated with a BFA degree from the University of Oklahoma in Norman. Later in 1947, he hitchhiked with Dennis Weaver, his best friend at the university, to New York City, where he landed the role of Turk in Come Back, Little Sheba.

== Television ==
Chapman's first role on television was in 1951 on the series Starlight Theatre, playing the part of an arrogant high-school football player in an episode titled "Miss Bruell". Throughout the remainder of the 1950s, he continued to be cast in other series and gain experience in supporting roles. In 1958 he portrayed detective Jeff Prior in the NBC series The Investigator. He appeared twice on the CBS series The Defenders from 1961 to 1965. Seven years later, he played another detective, Frank Malloy, in the CBS series For the People.

Some of the other series in which Chapman appeared in supporting roles or as a guest star include Gunsmoke, Harbourmaster, The Rifleman, The Lloyd Bridges Show, The Everglades, Decoy, Dundee and the Culhane, Mission: Impossible, Storefront Lawyers, Quincy, M.E., The A-Team, The Virginian, Matlock, NYPD Blue, Bonanza and Murder, She Wrote. In 1964 he also performed on Perry Mason, portraying a murderer, Jack Talley, in "The Case of the Tandem Target". He appeared as well in the 1966 episode "Lone Woman" of The Road West. Between 1972 and 1975, he guest-starred in three episodes of NBC's McCloud, which starred his friend Dennis Weaver, whom Chapman had originally urged to go into show business. In the late 1970s, he appeared in the episode "The Waterhole" on The Oregon Trail (1977), the episode "Now You see Her..." on The Eddie Capra Mysteries (1978), and as the character L. Patrick Gray in the miniseries Blind Ambition (1979).

== Film ==
Chapman first film role was "Ernie the plumber" in the 1955 movie Young at Heart. During his lengthy career, his appearances included roles in East of Eden (1955), Baby Doll (1956), The Birds (1963), The Cowboys (1972), Where the Red Fern Grows (1974), Norma Rae (1979), 52 Pick-Up (1986) and Reindeer Games (2000).

== Stage ==
Chapman debuted as a professional actor on stage in Chicago, where he portrayed Wiley as in a company presenting Mr. Roberts. His first Broadway appearance was as a guard in The Closing Door (1949). He also portrayed Tom in a revival of The Time of Your Life on Broadway and at the Brussels World's Fair.

From 1956 to 1961, he taught acting in New York. In 1973, he became artistic director of the non-profit Group Repertory Theatre in North Hollywood, California. In 1999, its name was changed to the Lonny Chapman Group Repertory Theatre. During his tenure, the group presented more than 350 productions.

Plays that he wrote included The Buffalo Skinner (1958), Cry of the Raindrop (1960), Hoot Sudie (1970), Go Hang the Moon (1974), Night at the Red Dog (1979), and Happy Days Are Here Again Blues (1979).

During the summers of 1959 through 1967, Chapman directed and produced more than 80 plays in Fishkill, New York, and he acted in more than 30 of them.

== Recognition ==
In the fall of 2005, Chapman was named "Outstanding Alumnus" at Missouri Southern State University, in his hometown of Joplin. Chapman's best friend since his university days, fellow actor Dennis Weaver, had previously received that honor.

== Personal life and death ==
In 1944, Chapman married the former Erma Dean Gibbons of Joplin, Missouri. The couple remained married for 63 years and had two children: a daughter, Linda Dean, and a son, Wyley. On October 12, 2007, at the age of 87, Chapman died of complications from heart disease at a care facility in North Hollywood.

== Filmography ==
Year	Title	Role	Notes
1954	Young at Heart	Ernie Nichols	
1955	East of Eden	Roy Turner - Automobile Mechanic	Uncredited
1956	Baby Doll	Rock	
1963	The Birds	Deke Carter - Diner Owner	
1963	Gunsmoke	Wade	
1964	Perry Mason	Jack Talley	
1965	Gunsmoke	Dove Bailey	
1966	Gunsmoke	Sipes	
1967	Mission: Impossible	Edward Hughes	
1967	The Big Valley	Jack Dobbs	
1967	The Big Valley	Cody Grell	
1967	A Covenant with Death	Musgrave	
1967	Hour of the Gun	Turkey Creek Johnson	
1968	The Stalking Moon	Purdue	
1969	Take the Money and Run	Jake - Convict	
1969	The Reivers	Maury McCaslin	
1970	I Walk the Line	Bascomb	
1971	Mission Impossible	Lt. Bill Orcott	
1971	Welcome Home, Soldier Boys	Danny's Father	
1972	The Cowboys	Homer's Father	
1972	Run, Cougar, Run	Harry Walker	
1973	Running Wild	Senator Frank Coombs	
1973	Cotter	Deputy Higgins	
1973	The Rookies	Crater	Season 1, Episode 23 - Easy Money
1974	Where the Red Fern Grows	Sheriff	
1974	Hurricane	Pappy	
1974	Earthquake	L.A.P.D. Captain	Uncredited
1976	The Witch Who Came from the Sea	Long John	
1976	Moving Violation	Sheriff Rankin	
1978	The Bad News Bears Go to Japan	Louis the Gambler	
1979	Norma Rae	Gardner	
1979	Hanging by a Thread	Charles Minton	
1980	When Time Ran Out	Kelly	
1980	Running Scared	Pa Beecher	
1981	Amy	Virgil Goodloe	
1982	The Border	Andy	
1983	Cave-In!	Walt Charles	
1986	52 Pick-Up	Jim O'Boyle	
1997	Nightwatch	Old Watchman	
2000	Reindeer Games	Old Timer	
2003	The Hunted	Zander	(final film role)
