= Héctor Elizondo =

American actor (born 1936)

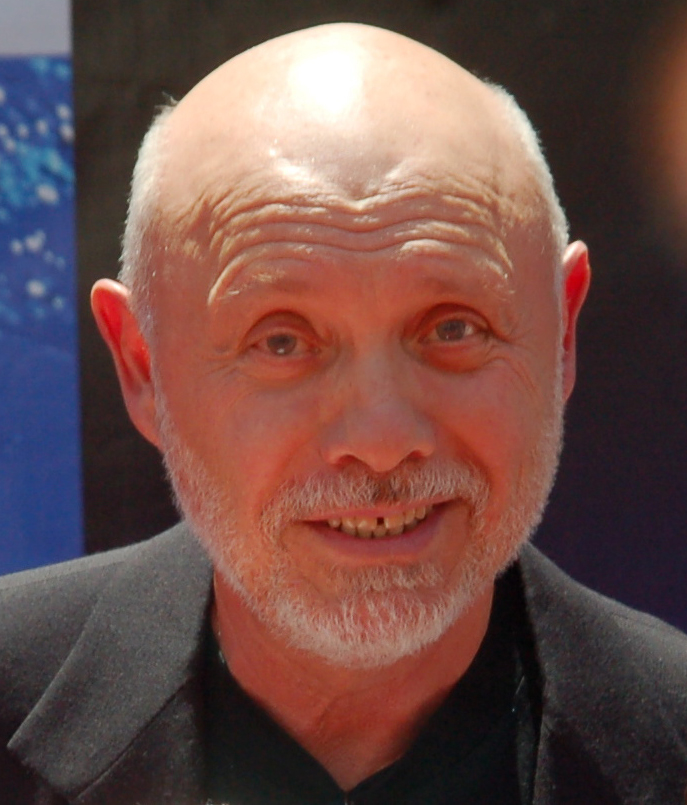
- Elizondo at the premiere for Earth in 2009
- Born: December 22, 1936 (age 89); New York City, U.S.
- Other name: Hector Elizondo
- Education: Fiorello H. LaGuardia High School of Music & Art and Performing Arts
- Occupations: Actor; musician; television director
- Years active: 1963–present
- Spouses: Marie Rivera (m. 1956; div. 1957) Marie Mandry (m. 1963; div. 1964) Carolee Campbell (m. 1969)
- Children: 1

Héctor Elizondo (born December 22, 1936) is an American character actor. He is known for playing Phillip Watters in the television series Chicago Hope (1994–2000) and Ed Alzate in the television series Last Man Standing (2011–2021). His film roles include Pocket Money (1972), The Taking of Pelham One Two Three (1974), Cuba (1979), American Gigolo (1980), The Flamingo Kid (1984), Taking Care of Business (1990), Pretty Woman (1990), Beverly Hills Cop III (1994), The Princess Diaries (2001), and Love in the Time of Cholera (2007).

Elizondo has received an Obie Award, a Primetime Emmy Award, and two ALMA Awards, and had been nominated for a Drama Desk Award, a Golden Globe Award, a Satellite Award, and five Screen Actors Guild Awards.

== Early life ==
Hector Elizondo was born on December 22, 1936, in New York, the son of Carmen Medina Reyes and Martín Echevarría Elizondo, an accountant and notary public. His parents were Puerto Ricans of Spanish descent who moved from Puerto Rico to New York City with the hope of finding a better life. He grew up near 107th street on Manhattan's Upper West Side.

At a young age, he demonstrated a talent for sports and music. He sang for the Frank Murray Boys' Choir when he was 10 years old. Upon graduating from junior high school in 1950, he enrolled in the High School of the Performing Arts. He also attended another public high school, where he excelled in basketball and baseball. His baseball skills were good enough for him to be scouted by both the San Francisco Giants and the Pittsburgh Pirates. In 1954, Elizondo enrolled in City College of New York, intending to become a history teacher. However, during his freshman year, he became a father and dropped out of college, going to work full-time to support his family. Later, he divorced and gained full custody of his son, Rodd.

== Career ==
From 1962 to 1963, Elizondo studied dance at the Ballet Arts Company at Carnegie Hall. During the period, he also studied acting under Mario Stiletti at Stella Adler Theatre Studio when it was located in the Dryden East Hotel on East 39th St. In 1965, he landed a part in the off-Broadway show Kill the One-Eyed Man.

In 1968, he got a part in the play The Great White Hope. His first major success came when he played "God" in the guise of a Puerto Rican steam-room attendant in Steambath, for his performance in which he won an Obie Award.

In 1974, Elizondo played an ex-mafioso-turned-subway hijacker, "Mr. Grey," in The Taking of Pelham One Two Three.

He starred as a Puerto Rican widower on the CBS television series Popi (1975–1976). The short-lived series, which ran for 11 episodes, was one of the first American network television series to feature a Latino theme and cast. In 1975, he portrayed Hassan Salah, the murderer in an episode of Columbo, "A Case of Immunity". He was a member of the cast of the 1985–86 CBS situation comedy Foley Square, starring Margaret Colin.

In the 1980s, Elizondo befriended Garry Marshall, who was impressed with his talent. Their first film together was Young Doctors in Love, in which Elizondo displays his guitar-playing talent. His role in Pretty Woman lasted only 10 minutes, but led to a Golden Globe nomination. In 1999, he co-starred in Runaway Bride as Fisher, the husband of the male protagonist's ex-wife. Elizondo has participated in more than 80 films (18 of which have been Marshall's). He appeared in every film that Marshall directed, including a brief appearance as a Portuguese fisherman in Overboard.

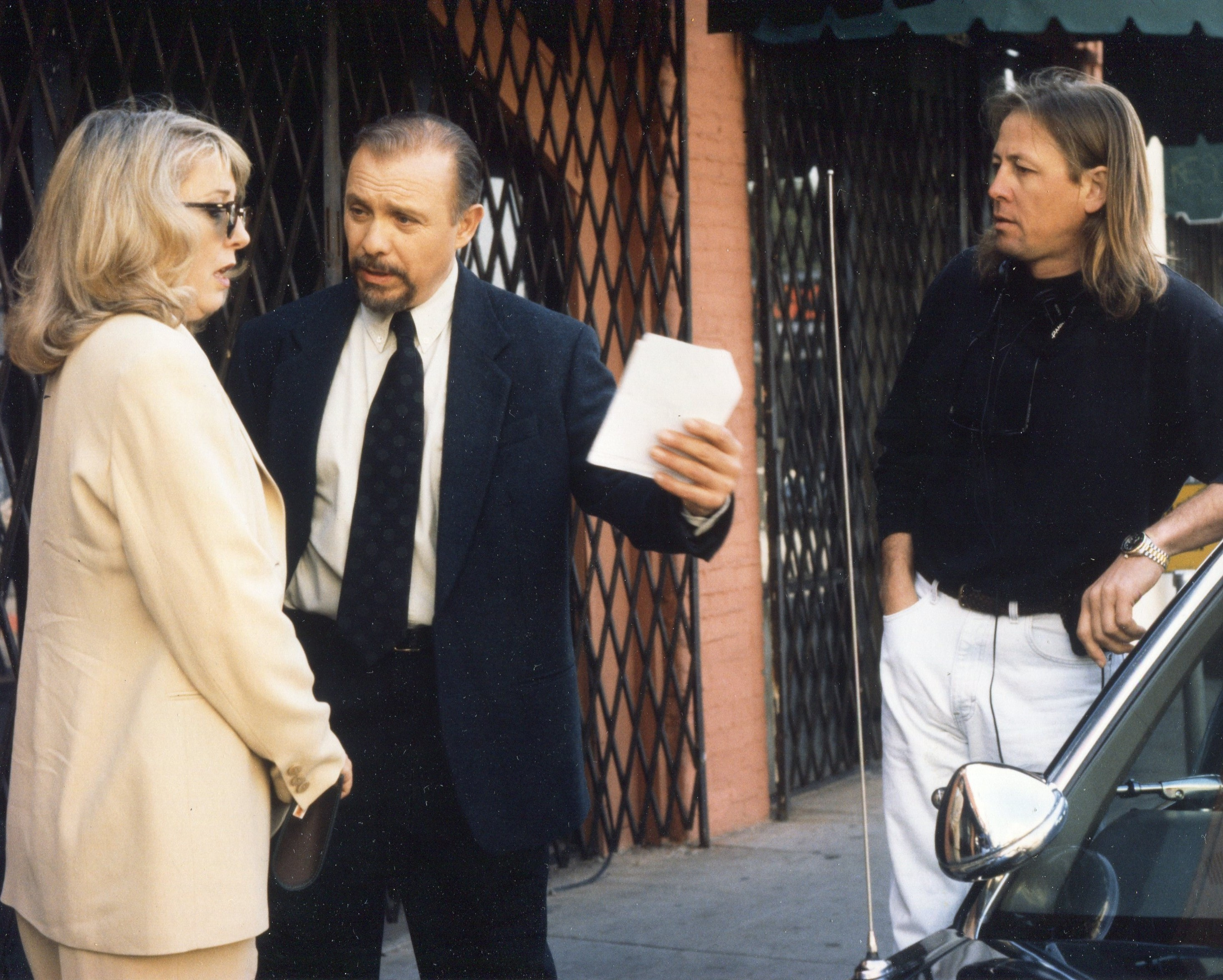
Actress Teri Garr and Héctor Elizondo on the set of Perfect Alibi (1995) with director Kevin Meyer.

In 2001, he was featured in the short-lived television drama Kate Brasher and portrayed security head Joe in the film The Princess Diaries, a role he reprised in the 2004 sequel, The Princess Diaries 2: Royal Engagement. As a voice-actor, he played Bane in Batman: Mystery of the Batwoman. He may be best known to television audiences as Dr. Phillip Watters on the CBS television series Chicago Hope created by well-known television creator David E. Kelley. He has won both an Emmy and ALMA award and was nominated for a Satellite Award and several SAG Awards for playing this role. He is one of only two people to remain on the show for its entire run, the other being Adam Arkin.

In 2008, Elizondo joined the cast of the USA Network series Monk as Dr. Neven Bell, Adrian Monk's new psychiatrist, following the sudden death of Stanley Kamel, the actor who played Monk's original psychiatrist. In 2023, he reprised his role in Mr. Monk's Last Case: A Monk Movie after some convincing from Tony Shalhoub.

From 2011 to 2021, Elizondo played Ed Alzate on the Fox (formerly ABC) comedy Last Man Standing, starring Tim Allen and Nancy Travis.

In 2023, Elizondo guest voiced a character, Romar Adell, a local of Serenno who went into hiding after the Empire bombarded the planet, on Star Wars: The Bad Batch.

== Personal life ==
Elizondo has been married three times. He became a father at the age of 19 with his first wife. Since 1969, he has been married to Carolee Campbell, an Emmy Award-winning actress who played nurse Carolee Simpson on The Doctors. They live in Sherman Oaks, California.

In April 2013, Elizondo participated in the Los Angeles Times Festival of Books, held at the University of Southern California, promoting children's reading. Proud of his Latino heritage, Elizondo has said he does not accept roles that he feels are stereotypical or demeaning in any way.

== Filmography ==
=== Film ===
Year	Title	Role	Notes
1963	The Fat Black Pussycat		
1969	The Vixens	Inspector	
1970	The Landlord	Hector	
1971	Valdez Is Coming	Mexican Rider	
1971	Born to Win	Vivian	
1972	Deadhead Miles	Bad Character	
1972	Pocket Money	Juan	
1972	Stand Up and Be Counted	Lou Kellerman	
1974	The Taking of Pelham One Two Three	Mr. Grey	
1975	Report to the Commissioner	Captain D'Angelo	
1976	Diary of the Dead	Stan	
1977	Thieves	Man Below	
1979	Cuba	Capt. Raphael Ramirez	
1980	American Gigolo	Det. Sunday	
1981	The Fan	Police Insp. Raphael Andrews	
1982	Young Doctors in Love	Angelo/Angela Bonafetti	
1984	The Flamingo Kid	Arthur Willis	
1985	Private Resort	The Maestro	
1986	Nothing in Common	Charlie Gargas	
1987	Overboard	Garbage Scow Skipper	Uncredited
1988	Astronomy		Short film
1988	Beaches	Judge	Uncredited
1989	Leviathan	G.P. Cobb	
1990	Pretty Woman	Barnard Thompson	
1990	Taking Care of Business	Warden Frank Toolman	
1991	Final Approach	Dr. Dio Gottlieb	
1991	Necessary Roughness	Coach Ed Gennero	
1991	Frankie and Johnny	Nick	
1992	There Goes the Neighborhood	Norman Rutledge	
1992	Samantha	Walter	
1993	Being Human	Dom Paulo	
1994	Backstreet Justice	Steve Donovan	
1994	Beverly Hills Cop III	Jon Flint	
1994	Getting Even with Dad	Lt. Romayko	
1994	Exit to Eden	Dr. Martin Helifax	
1995	Perfect Alibi	Det. Ryker	
1996	Dear God	Vladek Vidov	
1997	Turbulence	Lt. Aldo Hines	
1999	The Other Sister	Ernie	
1999	Entropy	The Chairman	
1999	Runaway Bride	Fisher	
2001	Tortilla Soup	Martin Naranjo	
2001	The Princess Diaries	Joe	
2001	How High	Bill the Crew Coach	
2003	Batman: Mystery of the Batwoman	Bane	Voice, direct-to-video
2004	Raising Helen	Mickey Massey	Uncredited
2004	The Princess Diaries 2: Royal Engagement	Joe	
2004	¡Mucha Lucha!: The Return of El Maléfico	Ring Announcer	Voice
2006	I-See-You.Com	Greg Rishwain	
2006	The Celestine Prophecy	Cardinal Sebastian	
2007	Music Within	Ben Padrow	
2007	Georgia Rule	Izzy	
2007	Love in the Time of Cholera	Don Leo	
2010	Valentine's Day	Edgar	
2010	New York Street Games	Himself/narrator	Documentary
2011	New Year's Eve	Lester Kominsky	
2014	The Book of Life	Carlos Sanchez	Voice
2016	Mother's Day	Lance Wallace	
2017	The Lego Batman Movie	Commissioner James Gordon	Voice
2021	Music	George	
2021	Rita Moreno: Just a Girl Who Decided to Go for It	Himself	Documentary
2023	Max & Me	Gunter	Voice

=== Television ===
Year	Title	Role	Notes
1967	The Edge of Night	Dimitri	Unknown episodes
1969; 1970	The Doctors	Waiter; John Colley	2 episodes in March; 3 episodes in September
1969	The Jackie Gleason Show		Episode: "The Honeymooners: Mexican Hat Trick"
1971	The Impatient Heart	Mr. Hernandez	Television film
1972	All in the Family	Carlos Mendoza	Episode: "The Elevator Story"
1973, 1976	Kojak	Det. Nick Ferro, Carl Dettrow	2 episodes
1974	Maude	Cop	Episode: "Speed Trap"
1975	Baretta	Jerry Damon	Episode: "The Fire Man"
1975	Columbo: A Case of Immunity	Hassan Salah	Television film
1975, 1978	The Rockford Files	John Micelli, Frank Falcone	2 episodes
1976	Popi	Abraham Rodriguez	11 episodes
1976	Wanted: The Sundance Woman	Pancho Villa	Television film
1978	The Dain Curse	Ben Feeney	Television film
1978	The Eddie Capra Mysteries	Strickland	Episode: "Dying Declaration"
1980	Freebie and the Bean	Det. Sgt. Dan "Bean" Delgado	7 episodes
1982	Medal of Honor Rag		Television film
1982	Bret Maverick	Mr. Gomez	Episode: "The Hidalgo Thing"
1982	Honeyboy	Emilio Ramirez	Television film
1983	Feel the Heat	Monkey Moreno	Unknown episodes
1983	Casablanca	Capt. Louis Renault	5 episodes
1983	Women of San Quentin	Capt. Mike Reyes	Television film
1984	a.k.a. Pablo	Jose Sanchez/Shapiro	6 episodes
1984	Hill Street Blues	Insp. Joe Keenan	Episode: "Ewe and Me, Babe"
1985	Murder: My Reason of Insanity	Ben Haggarty	Television film
1985	Out of the Darkness	Father George	Television film
1985–1986	Foley Square	Jesse Steinberg	14 episodes
1986	Courage	Nick Miraldo	Television film
1986	Amazing Stories	Meadows	Episode: "Life on Death Row"
1986	Matlock	Det. Joe Peters	Episode: "The Cop"
1987	Tales from the Hollywood Hills: Natica Jackson	Morris King	Television film
1987	Night Heat	Detective Hector Gurvin	Episode: "The Kid"
1987	Down and Out in Beverly Hills	Dave Whiteman	13 episodes
1988	Addicted to His Love	Det. Currigan	Television film
1989	Kojak: Ariana	Edson Saunders	Television film
1989	The Equalizer	Ray Quintero	Episode: "Past Imperfect"
1989	Your Mother Wears Combat Boots	Sergeant Burke	Television film
1990	Sparks: The Price of Passion	Vic Ramos	Television film
1990	Dark Avenger	Capt. David Strauss	Television pilot
1990	Forgotten Prisoners: The Amnesty Files	Hasan Demir	Television film
1991	Chains of Gold	Lt. Ortega	Television film
1991	Finding the Way Home	Ruben	Television film
1991–93	The Pirates of Dark Water	Ioz	Voice, season 1 only
1992	The Burden of Proof	Alejandro "Sandy" Stern	Miniseries
1992	Fish Police	Don Calamari	Voice, episode: "Beauty's Only Fin Deep"
1992	Mrs. Cage	Lt. Angel	Television film
1993	Jonny's Golden Quest	Atacama	Voice, television film
1993	Tales from the Crypt	Leo Burn	Episode: "As Ye Sow"
1993	Animaniacs	Stradivarius	Voice, episode: "The Cat and the Fiddle"
1993	The Addams Family	Ian Thundermane	Voice, episode: "Double O Honeymoon"
1994	Picket Fences	Dr. Phillip Watters	Episode: "Rebels with Causes"
1994–95	Aladdin	Malcho	Voice, 2 episodes
1994–2000	Chicago Hope	Dr. Phillip Watters	Main role; 141 episodes
1995	Batman: The Animated Series	Sheldon Fallbrook	Voice, episode: "The Terrible Trio"
1995	Jonny Quest vs. The Cyber Insects	Attacama	Voice, television film
1996	Gargoyles	Zafiro	Voice, episode: "The Green"
1997	Murphy Brown	Himself	Episode: "Blind Date"
1997	Borrowed Hearts	Javier Del Campo	Television film
1998	Mikhail Baryshnikov's Stories from My Childhood	Voice	Episode: "Ivan and His Magic Pony"
1998	Early Edition	Dr. Phillip Watters	Episode: "Mum's the Word"
1998	Safe House	Dr. Simon	Television film
2001	Kate Brasher	Joe Almeida	6 episodes
2001–04	American Experience	Narrator	2 episodes
2002	Fidel	Eddie Chibas	Miniseries
2002	The West Wing	Dr. Dalton Millgate	Episode: "Dead Irish Writers"
2002	Street Time	Fariz Hammoud	3 episodes
2002	What's New, Scooby-Doo?	Dr. Guitirrez	Voice, episode: "3-D Struction"
2002	¡Mucha Lucha!	El Fundador	Voice, episode: "Our Founder"
2003	The Dating Experiment	Narrator	Unknown episodes
2003	Without a Trace	Father Henry Stevens	Episode: "Revelations"
2003	Miracles	Father "Poppi" Calero	4 episodes
2004	Century City	Martin Constable	9 episodes
2004	Jack & Bobby	Gerald Cruz	Episode: "Chess Lessons"
2004	Justice League	Lt. Kragger	Voice, episode: "Starcrossed"
2004	The Wild Thornberrys	Bald Eagle	Voice, episode: "Eliza Unplugged"
2004–06	Justice League Unlimited	Lt. Kragger, Hath-Set	Voice, 2 episodes
2006	Avatar: The Last Airbender	Wan Shi Tong	Voice, episode: "The Library"
2006	10 Days That Unexpectedly Changed America	Narrator	10 episodes
2007	Cane	Pancho Duque	Main role; 13 episodes
2007	El Tigre: The Adventures of Manny Rivera	Justice Jaguar	Voice, episode: "The Grave Escape"
2007–13	Grey's Anatomy	Carlos Torres	5 episodes
2008–09	Monk	Dr. Neven Bell	14 episodes
2010	Dora the Explorer	Wishing Wizzle	Voice, episode: "Dora's Big Birthday Adventure"
2010	Go, Diego, Go!	King Vicuna	Voice, episode: "Diego Rescues Prince Vicuna"
2011	American Dad!	Himself	Voice, episode: "Fartbreak Hotel"
2011	ThunderCats	Viragor	Voice, episode: "The Forest of Magi Oar"
2011–21	Last Man Standing	Ed Alzate	Main role
2013	The Legend of Korra	Wan Shi Tong	Voice, episode: "A New Spiritual Age"
2015	Cristela	Ed Alzate	Episode: "Last Goose Standing"
2015	Jake and the Never Land Pirates	Captain Colossus	Voice, episode: "The Legion of Pirate Villains!"
2016–18	Elena of Avalor	Fiero	Voice, 6 episodes
2017–20	Mickey and the Roadster Racers	Grandpa Beagle	Voice, 5 episodes
2021	Explained	Narrator	1 episode
2021	The Movies That Made Us	Himself	Episode: "Pretty Woman"
2021–22	B Positive	Harry Milton	Recurring role; 14 episodes
2022	Green Eggs and Ham	Dooka	Voice, 6 episodes
2023	Star Wars: The Bad Batch	Romar Adell	Voice, episode: "Ruins of War"
2023	Mr. Monk's Last Case: A Monk Movie	Dr. Neven Bell	TV movie

=== Theatre ===
Year	Title	Role	Venue	Ref.
1968	The Great White Hope	El Jefe / Deputy	Alvin Theatre, Broadway	
1971	The Prisoner of Second Avenue	Mel Edison (replacement)	Eugene O'Neill Theatre, Broadway	
1974	Dance of Death	Kurt	Vivian Beaumont Theatre, Broadway	
1976	Sly Fox	Simon Able	Broadhurst Theatre, Broadway	
1992	The Price	Victor Franz	Criterion Center Stage Right, Broadway	

=== Video games ===
Year	Title	Role	Ref.
2003	Batman: Rise of Sin Tzu	Bane	
2010	Dora the Explorer: Dora's Big Birthday Adventure	Wishing Wizzle	

== Awards and nominations ==
OBIE Award

- 1971: Won, "Distinguished Performances" – Steambath

ALMA Awards

- 1998: Nominated, "Outstanding Individual Performance in a Television Series in a Crossover Role" – Chicago Hope
- 1998: Nominated, "Outstanding Individual Performance in a Television Series in a Crossover Role" – Turbulence
- 1998: Won, "Outstanding Actor in a Made-for-Television Movie or Mini-Series" – Borrowed Hearts
- 1999: Nominated, "Outstanding Individual Performance in a Television Series in a Crossover Role" – Chicago Hope
- 2000: Nominated, "Outstanding Actor in a Feature Film" – Runaway Bride
- 2000: Won, "Outstanding Actor in a Drama Series" – Chicago Hope
- 2002: Nominated, "Outstanding Actor in a Motion Picture" – Tortilla Soup

Emmy Awards

- 1992: Nominated, "Outstanding Supporting Actor in a Miniseries or a Special" – Mrs. Cage
- 1995: Nominated, "Outstanding Supporting Actor in a Drama Series" – Chicago Hope
- 1996: Nominated, "Outstanding Supporting Actor in a Drama Series" – Chicago Hope
- 1997: Won, "Outstanding Supporting Actor in a Drama Series" – Chicago Hope
- 1998: Nominated, "Outstanding Supporting Actor in a Drama Series" – Chicago Hope

Golden Globe Awards

- 1991: Nominated, "Best Performance by an Actor in a Supporting Role in a Motion Picture" – Pretty Woman

Imagen Foundation Awards

- 2005: Nominated, "Best Supporting Actor in a Film" – The Princess Diaries 2: Royal Engagement

NCLR Bravo Awards

- 1996: Nominated, "Outstanding Television Series Actor in a Crossover Role" – Chicago Hope

Satellite Awards

- 1997: Nominated, "Best Performance By an Actor in a Television Drama Series" – Chicago Hope

SAG Awards

- 1995: Nominated, "Outstanding Performance by a Male Actor in a Drama Series" – Chicago Hope
- 1997: Nominated, "Outstanding Performance by an Ensemble in a Drama Series" – Chicago Hope
- 1998: Nominated, "Outstanding Performance by an Ensemble in a Drama Series" – Chicago Hope

Temecula Valley International Film Festival

- 2006: Won, "Lifetime Achievement Award"

== See also ==
- List of Puerto Ricans
