= Final Approach (1991 film) =

1991 film by Eric Steven Stahl

- Directed by: Eric Steven Stahl
- Written by: Eric Steven Stahl; Gerald Laurence
- Starring: James Sikking; Hector Elizondo
- Distributed by: Trimark Pictures
- Release date: July 24, 1991 (France)
- Running time: 100 minutes
- Country: United States
- Language: English
- Budget: $12.8 million

Final Approach is a 1991 American thriller film directed by Eric Steven Stahl.

The SR-71 Blackbird spy plane is featured in the film. Final Approach was the first film to be originally recorded, mixed and mastered in pure digital sound.

== Plot ==
Final Approach deals with the mental condition of amnesia when a stealth test pilot, Col. Jason Halsey (James Sikking), is involved in an air disaster. A psychiatrist Dr. Dio Gottlieb (Hector Elizondo) attempts to help Halsey to recover his memory, but his motives seem suspect.

== Cast ==
- James Sikking as Col. Jason Halsey
- Hector Elizondo as Dr. Dio Gottlieb
- Madolyn Smith as Casey Halsey
- Kevin McCarthy as Gen. Geller
- Cameo Kneuer as Brooke Halsey
- Wayne Duvall as Doug Slessinger
