= List of Jayne Mansfield performances =

This is a list of performances by actress Jayne Mansfield, including films, television, theater, music, and documentaries.

== Filmography ==
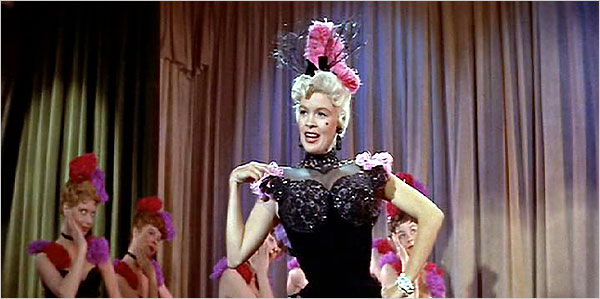
The Sheriff of Fractured Jaw

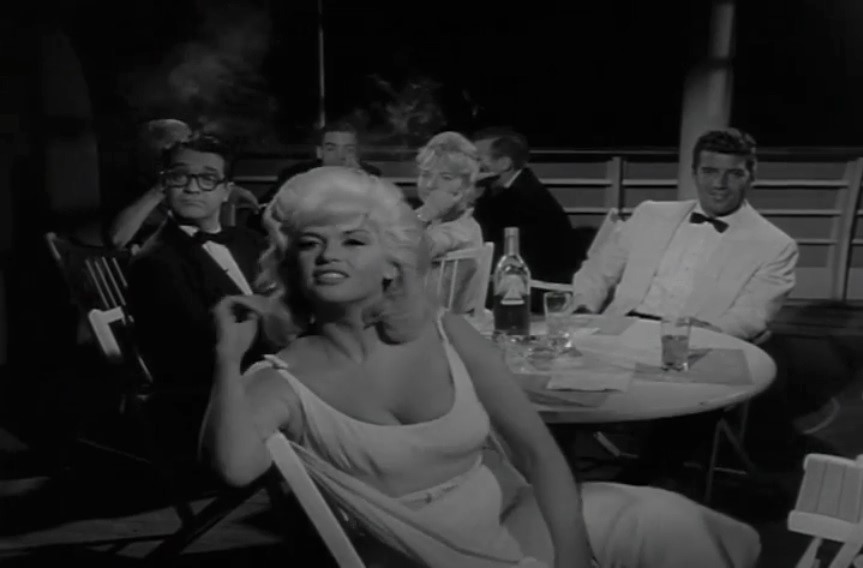
Promises! Promises!

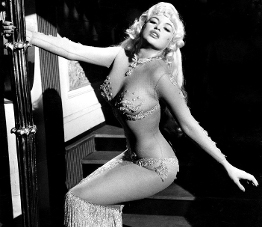
Too Hot to Handle

Will Success Spoil Rock Hunter?

Release year (US release)	Movie title (Alternative title)	Role	Selected co-actors	Director	Producer (Production country)	Notes
1955	Female Jungle (The Hangover – original title)	Candy Price	Burt Kaiser, Kathleen Crowley	Bruno VeSota	Burt Kaiser, Samuel Z. Arkoff, James H. Nicholson (United States)	
1955	Pete Kelly's Blues	Cigarette Girl	Jack Webb, Janet Leigh, Edmond O'Brien, Peggy Lee	Jack Webb	Warner Bros.	Uncredited.
1955	Illegal	Angel O'Hara	Edward G. Robinson, Nina Foch, Hugh Marlowe	Lewis Allen	Warner Bros. (United States)	
1955	Hell on Frisco Bay	Mario's dance partner in nightclub	Alan Ladd, Fay Wray	Frank Tuttle	Jaguar Productions (United States)	Uncredited.
1956	The Girl Can't Help It (Do Re Mi – original title)	Jerri Jordan	Tom Ewell, Edmond O'Brien, Julie London, Ray Anthony	Frank Tashlin	20th Century Fox (United States)	
1957	The Burglar	Gladden	Dan Duryea, Martha Vickers, Peter Capell, Mickey Shaughnessy	Paul Wendkos	Columbia Pictures (United States)	Filmed in 1955.
1957	The Wayward Bus	Camille Oakes	Joan Collins, Dan Dailey	Victor Vicas	20th Century Fox (United States)	
1957	Will Success Spoil Rock Hunter? (Oh! For a Man! – UK, original title; Siren in Blond – Germany)	Rita Marlowe	Tony Randall, Betsy Drake, Joan Blondell, John Williams, Henry Jones	Frank Tashlin	20th Century Fox (United States)	
1957	Kiss Them for Me	Alice Kratzner	Cary Grant, Leif Erickson, Suzy Parker	Stanley Donen	Sol C. Siegel (United States)	
1958 (1959)	The Sheriff of Fractured Jaw (La Bionda e Lo Sceriffo – Italy; The Blonde and the Sheriff – US)	Kate	Kenneth More, Henry Hull, Bruce Cabot	Raoul Walsh	20th Century Fox (United States)	
1960 (1963)	The Challenge (It Takes a Thief – U.S.)	Billy	Anthony Quayle, Carl Möhner, Peter Reynolds	John Gilling	Alexandra (United Kingdom)	
1960 (1961)	Too Hot to Handle (Playgirl After Dark – U.S.)	Midnight Franklin	Leo Genn, Karlheinz Böhm, Christopher Lee	Terence Young	Wigmore Productions (United Kingdom)	
1960	The Loves of Hercules (Gli Amori di Ercole – Italy; Les Amours d'Hercule – France; Hercules vs. the Hydra – TV title)	Queen Dianira/ Hippolyta	Mickey Hargitay, Massimo Serato	Carlo Ludovico Bragaglia	Contact Organisation (Italy)	Voiced by Carolyn De Fonseca. Never released theatrically in the USA.
1961	The George Raft Story (Spin of a Coin – UK)	Lisa Lang	Ray Danton, Julie London, Barrie Chase	Joseph M. Newman	Allied Artists Pictures (United States)	
1962	It Happened in Athens	Eleni Costa	Trax Colton, Nico Minardos, Bob Mathias	Andrew Marton	20th Century Fox (United States)	Filmed in fall, 1960. Filmed in Greece.
1963	Heimweh nach St. Pauli (Homesick for St. Pauli)	Evelyne	Freddy Quinn, Josef Albrecht, Ullrich Haupt	Werner Jacobs	Rapid Film (Germany)	Never released.
1963	Promises! Promises! (Promise Her Anything – some releases)	Sandy Brooks	Marie McDonald, Tommy Noonan, Mickey Hargitay	King Donovan	Tommy Noonan, Donald F. Taylor (United States)	
1964 (1966)	L'Amore Primitivo (Primitive Love – U.S.)	Dr. Jane	Franco and Ciccio, Mickey Hargitay	Luigi Scattini	G.L.M. (Italy)	Voiced by Carolyn De Fonseca. Filmed in Italy in May 1964.
1964	Panic Button (Let's Go Bust – U.S.; Operazione Fisco – Italy)	Angela	Maurice Chevalier, Eleanor Parker, Mike Connors	George Sherman, Giuliano Carnimeo	Gordon Films (United States)	Filmed in 1962. Filmed in Italy.
1964 (1966)	Einer frisst den anderen (Dog Eat Dog! – U.S.)	Darlene/ Mrs. Smithopolis	Cameron Mitchell, Dodie Heath, Ivor Salter	Richard E. Cunha, Gustav Gavrin	Dubrava Film (Germany)	Voiced by Carolyn De Fonseca. Filmed in late 1963 in Yugoslavia.
1966	The Fat Spy	Junior Wellington	Phyllis Diller, Jack E. Leonard	Joseph Cates	Woolner Brothers (United States)	
1966	The Las Vegas Hillbillys (Country Music)	Tawny Downs	Ferlin Husky	Arthur Pierson	Woolner Brothers (United States)	
1967	A Guide for the Married Man	Technical Advisor (Girl with Harold)	Walter Matthau, Inger Stevens	Gene Kelly	20th Century Fox (United States)	Cameo appearance.
1968	Single Room Furnished	Johnnie/ Mae/ Eileen	Dorothy Keller, Fabian Dean, Billy M. Greene	Matt Cimber	Empire Film Studios (United States)	Posthumous release. Filmed in mid-1966.
1968	The Wild, Wild World of Jayne Mansfield	Herself	Mickey Hargitay; Robert Jason (narrator)	Charles W. Broun, Jr.; Joel Holt	Jad Films; Parnass Film	Documentary. Filmed in 1967. Posthumous release. Voiced by Carolyn De Fonseca

== Television work ==
=== Fiction ===
Show	Broadcast year	Episode	Station	Co-stars	Writer	Director	Producer	Notes
Burke's Law	March, 1964	"Who Killed Molly"? Episode 26, Season 1	ABC	—	—	—	Four Star Television	—
The Red Skelton Hour	February, 1963	"Advice to the Loveworn"; Episode 21, Season 12	CBS	—	—	—	—	—
The Alfred Hitchcock Hour	December 6, 1962	"Hangover"; Episode 12, Season 1	CBS	Tony Randall	Charles Runyon (short story)	Bernard Girard	—	Marion
The Red Skelton Hour	September, 1961	"Will Success Spoil Clem Kadiddlehopper"? Episode 1, Season 11	CBS	—	—	—	—	—
Monte Carlo	August, 1961	—	—	Richard Anderson	—	—	20th Century Fox Television	Failed pilot for a proposed NBC adventurer series
Kraft Mystery Theater	August, 1961	"The House of Rue Riviera"; Episode 12, Season 1	—	—	—	—	—	—
Follow the Sun	February, 1962	"The Dumbest Blonde"; Episode 21, Season 1	ABC	—	—	—	20th Century Fox Television	—
After Hours	December, 1959	Episode 13, Season 2	ABC	—	Jesse Goldstein, Dave O'Brien, Sherwood Schwartz, Red Skelton	Seymour Berns	ABC Weekend TV	—
The Red Skelton Hour	6 October 1959	"Clem's General Store"; Episode 2, Season 9	CBS	David Rose and his Orchestra, Jamie Farr, Art Gilmore, The Skelton Dancers, Red Skelton, Jesse White	Jesse Goldstein, Dave O'Brien, Sherwood Schwartz, Red Skelton	Seymour Berns	Desilu Productions	—
Shower of Stars	January 1957	"Star Time"; Episode 4, Season 3	NBC	—	Coleman Jacoby, Arnie Rosen	Joseph Cates	Desilu Productions	—
Sunday Spectacular	July, 1956	"The Bachelor"; TV movie	NBC	Raymond Bramley, Renzo Cesana, Carol Haney, Harry Holcombe, Georgann Johnson, Hal March, Julie Wilson	Sam Perrin, George Balzer, Hal Goldman, Al Gordon	Ralph Levy	J&M Productions	Genre: Comedy show
Lux Video Theatre	21 October 1954	"An Angel Went AWOL"	NBC	Ken Carpenter, Joanne Dru, Robert Jordan, Charlotte Knight, Margaret Lindsay, George Nader, Angela Stevens	Winifred Wolfe, Jack Gordun	Earl Eby	J. Walter Thompson	Genre: Live; Uncredited

=== Shows ===
Show	Broadcast year	Episode	Station	Co-stars	Writer	Director	Producer	Notes
Dateline: Hollywood	30 June 1967	—	—	—	—	—	—	Genre: Talk show
The Joey Bishop Show	19 June 1967	Episode 46, Season 1	—	Frankie Laine, Louis Lomax, Ross Martin	—	—	—	Genre: Talk show
Candid Camera	13 March 1967	—	—	—	—	—	—	Genre: Reality-TV
The Pat Boone Show	12 January 1967	—	—	Robert Clary	—	—	—	Genre: Comedy
The Pat Boone Show	11 January 1967	—	—	Robert Clary	—	—	—	Genre: Comedy
The Bob Hope Show	14 December 1966	"A Bob Hope Comedy Special"; Episode 4, Season 17	—	Michael Caine, Glenn Ford, Glenn Ford, Merle Oberon, Elke Sommer	—	—	Hope Enterprise	Genre: Variety show
What's My Line?	1956, 1957, 1964, 1966	4 Episodes	CBS	—	—	—	—	Genre: Game show
The Jack Benny Program	November 1963	"Jack Takes Boat to Hawaii"; Episode 9, Season 14	CBS	Peggy Mondo, Sam Hearn, Donald Randolph, Vince Williams, Ollie O'Toole, Dolores Domasin	Sam Perrin, George Balzer, Al Gordon, Hal Goldman	Frederick De Cordova	J&M Productions	Genre: Comedy show
The Tonight Show	January, 1962	Episode 9, Season 14	NBC	—	—	—	NBC	Genre: Late-night talk show Alternative title: The Jack Paar Tonight Show
The Tonight Show	April, 1962	Episode 9, Season 14	NBC	—	—	—	NBC	Genre: Late-night talk show
Val Parnell's Sunday Night at the London Palladium	September, 1957	Episode 1, Season 3	Associated Television	—	—	—	—	Genre: Variety show
The Ed Sullivan Show	May, 1957	4 Episodes	CBS	—	—	—	—	Genre: Variety show Alternative title: Toast of the Town
The Ed Sullivan Show	August, 1957	Episode 46, Season 10	CBS	—	—	—	—	Genre: Variety show
Tonight! America After Dark	1957	Episode 9, Season 14	NBC	Paul Coates, Bob Considine, Joan Crawford	—	—	NBC	Genre: Late-night talk show
The Jack Benny Program	December, 1956	"Talent Show"; Episode 8, Season 7	CBS	Rochester Van Jones, Don Wilson	Sam Perrin, George Balzer, Hal Goldman, Al Gordon	Ralph Levy	J&M Productions	Genre: Comedy show

- Person to Person
- Talk It Up
- The Match Game

== Discography ==
=== Albums ===
Release year	Title	Co-artist	Publisher	Production Country	Notes
1962	Jayne Mansfield Busts Up Las Vegas	Mickey Hargitay, Arthur Blake, Bill Reddie & his Orchestra	20th Century Fox	United States	Recorded in the Arabian Room at the Dunes Hotel
1964	Shakespeare, Tchaikovsky & Me	Earl Wilson (liner notes)	MGM	United States	—
2000	I Wanna Be Loved By You	—	Golden Options	United States	Posthumous
2002	Dyed Blondes	Marilyn Monroe	Recall Records	United States	Posthumous
2003	Too Hot to Handle	—	Blue Moon	France	Posthumous

=== Singles ===
Release year	Title	Alternative title	Co-artist	Publisher	Production country	Notes
1966	"That Makes It"	—	—	—	United States	From the film The Las Vegas Hillbillys
1960	"Too Hot to Handle"	—	—	—	United States	From the film Too Hot to Handle
—	"Little Things Mean a Lot"	—	—	—	United States	—
1967	"As The Clouds Drift By"	—	Jimi Hendrix	—	United States	A-side of "Suey"
1967	"Suey"	—	Jimi Hendrix	—	United States	B-side of "As The Clouds Drift By"
—	"You Were Made for Me"	—	—	—	United States	—
1963	"Wo Ist Der Mann"	—	—	—	Germany	From the film Heimweh nach St. Pauli
1963	"Snicksnack-Snucklchen"	—	—	—	Germany	From the film Heimweh nach St. Pauli
1963	"I'm In Love"	"Lullaby of Love"	—	—	United States	From the film Promises! Promises!
1963	"Promise Her Anything"	—	—	—	United States	From the film Promises! Promises!
—	"It's a Living"	—	—	—	United States	—

== Stage work ==
Opening date	Title	Location	Co-artist	Playwright	Director	Notes
1953	Death of a Salesman	—	—	Arthur Miller	—	—
13 October 1955	Will Success Spoil Rock Hunter?	—	—	George Axelrod	George Axelrod	—
February 12, 1958	The Tropicana Holiday	Tropicana Las Vegas	Mickey Hargitay, Elaine Dunn, Cathy Lee Crosby, Dante D'Paulo, Gearoge Chakaris, Lizanne Truex, Sean Garrison, Jack Ackerman	—	Monte Proser	Striptease revue
December 29, 1960	The House of Love	Tropicana Las Vegas	Mickey Hargitay	—	Jack Cole	Striptease revue
1962	Les Poupees De Paris	—	Pearl Bailey, Milton Berle, Cyd Charisse, Annie Farge, Gene Kelly, Liberace, Tony Martin, Phil Silvers, Loretta Young	Sammy Cahn (lyrics); James Van Heusen (music)		—
May 26 - June 14, 1964	Bus Stop	—	—	William Inge	Matt Cimber	—
1966	Gentlemen Prefer Blondes	—	—	Leo Robin (lyrics); Jule Styne (music)		—
December 1, 1965	Rabbit Habit	Denver	—	—	—	—
1965	Champagne Complex	—	—	—	Matt Cimber	—

== Bibliography ==
- Jayne Mansfield's Wild, Wild World (Holloway House; 1963; co-author: Mickey Hargitay)
