= Jayne Mansfield =

American actress, Playmate, and singer (1933–1967)

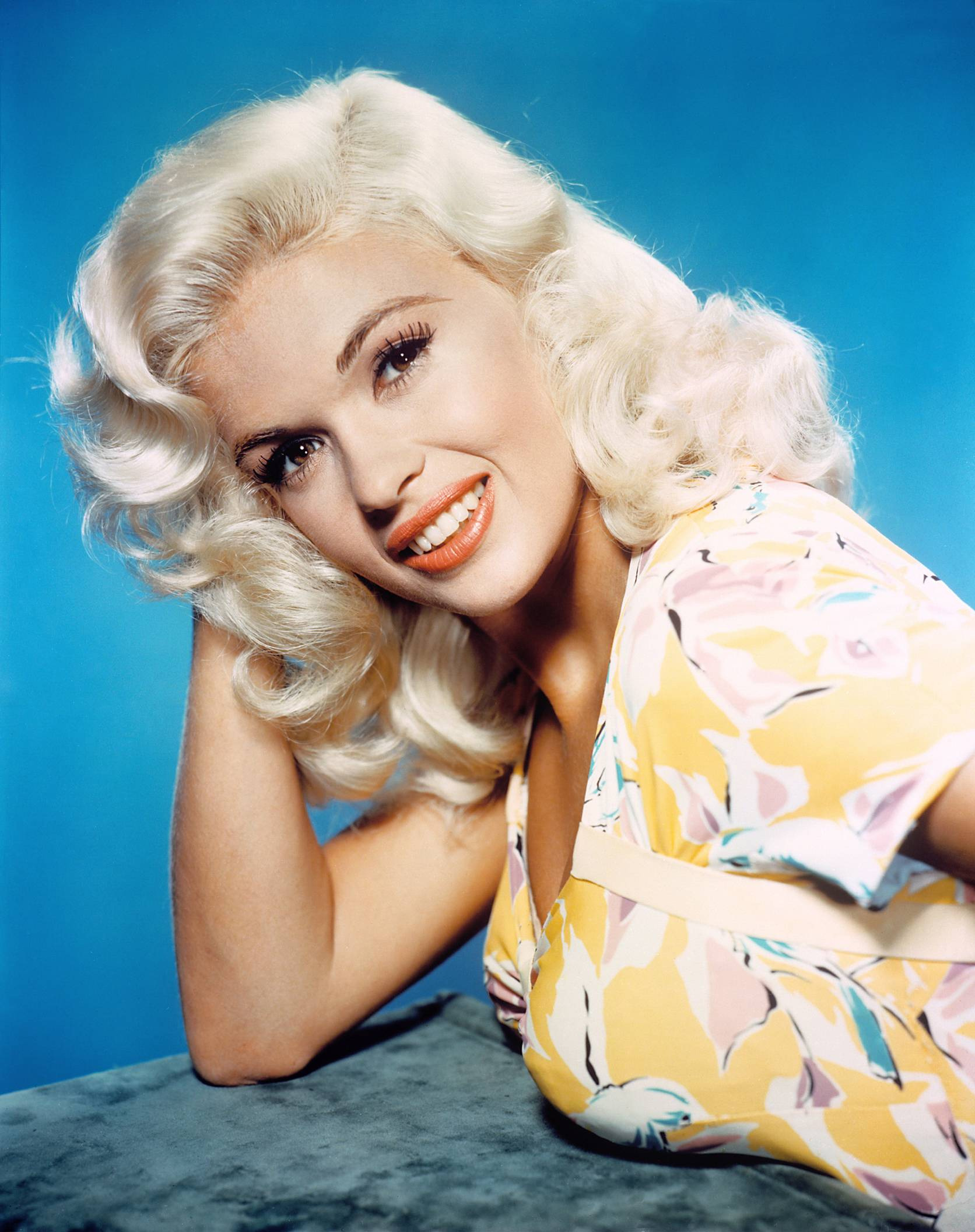
- Mansfield in 1957
- Born: Vera Jayne Palmer; April 19, 1933; Bryn Mawr, Pennsylvania, U.S.
- Died: June 29, 1967 (aged 34); New Orleans, Louisiana, U.S.
- Burial place: Fairview Cemetery, Pen Argyl, Pennsylvania
- Occupations: Actress; singer; Playboy Playmate; nightclub entertainer; model
- Years active: 1954–1967
- Spouses: Paul Mansfield (m. 1950; div. 1958); Mickey Hargitay (m. 1958; div. 1964); Matt Cimber (m. 1964; sep. 1965)
- Children: 5, including Jayne Marie and Mariska
- Awards: Theatre World Award for Promising Personality (1956); Golden Globe for New Star Of The Year – Actress (1957)
- Website: jaynemansfield.com

Jayne Mansfield (born Vera Jayne Palmer; April 19, 1933 – June 29, 1967) was an American actress, Playboy Playmate, and singer. She was one of the original blonde bombshells and a leading sex symbol during the late 1950s and early 1960s. She was well-known for her publicity stunts, buxom figure, her fondness for the color pink, and for personifying the dumb blonde stereotype.

Mansfield's career as a major film star was short-lived, but she remained a household name up to her death despite her career descending into low-budget films by the early 1960's. At her peak she had several box office successes, and would win a Theatre World Award and a Golden Globe Award. Her breakthrough came in the Broadway comedy Will Success Spoil Rock Hunter? in 1955, which would lead to her signing with 20th Century Fox, where she was promoted as a successor to Marilyn Monroe. She was directed by Frank Tashlin in The Girl Can't Help It (1956) and the screen version of Will Success Spoil Rock Hunter? (1957), both considered classics, played dramatic roles in The Wayward Bus (1957) and Too Hot to Handle (1960), and was the first American actress to appear nude in a sound film in Promises! Promises! (1963).

Mansfield was a fixture on television throughout her career, where her comedic timing was showcased on several different variety shows and game shows, sometimes in the company of comedians, like Jack Benny and Jackie Gleason. Mansfield toured with Bob Hope in his USO shows, and received continued publicity revolving around her physical appearance, wardrobe malfunctions, and marriages to muscleman Mickey Hargitay and producer-director Matt Cimber. Following her death in an automobile accident in 1967, she has remained a presence in popular culture.

== Early life ==
Jayne Mansfield was born Vera Jayne Palmer on April 19, 1933, at Bryn Mawr Hospital in Bryn Mawr, Pennsylvania, the only child of Herbert William Palmer and Vera Jeffrey Palmer. (Note: Mansfield's mother's full name before marriage was Vera Jeffrey Palmer. Jeffrey is not her "maiden name", it is a family name Vera inherited from her mother (Jayne Mansfield's grandmother), Beatrice (Jeffrey) Palmer. So, Jayne's mother's full name, including her "born as" last name, was Vera Jeffrey Palmer Palmer.) She inherited more than $90,000 from her maternal grandfather, Thomas H. Palmer, and more than $36,000 from her maternal grandmother, Beatrice Mary Palmer, in 1958. (Note: Vera Jeffrey Palmer's father, Thomas H. Palmer, was from the largely Cornish area of Pen Argyl, Pennsylvania, where he was involved with the slate industry.)

Until age six, Palmer lived in Phillipsburg, New Jersey, where her father, Herbert, was an attorney practicing with future New Jersey governor Robert B. Meyner. In 1936, her father died of a heart attack while driving. A three-year-old Palmer was in the car at the time.

In 1939, Palmer's widowed mother married sales engineer Harry Lawrence Peers. The family moved to Dallas, Texas. As a girl, Jayne was known as Vera Jayne Peers. As a child, Palmer wanted to be a Hollywood star like Shirley Temple. At age 12, she took ballroom dance lessons. She graduated from Highland Park High School in 1950. While in high school, she took violin, piano, and viola lessons. She also studied Spanish and German. One of her classmates was future actress Ann Wedgeworth.

== Career ==
=== Early modeling and performing ===
While attending the University of Texas at Austin, Palmer won several beauty contests, including "Miss Photoflash", "Miss Magnesium Lamp", and "Miss Fire Prevention Week". She refused the title "Miss Roquefort Cheese", because she believed it "just didn't sound right", and she rejected "Miss Prime Rib" in 1957.

Palmer married Paul Mansfield in 1950. In 1952, while in Dallas, Jayne and Paul Mansfield participated in small local-theater productions of The Slaves of Demon Rum and Ten Nights in a Barroom. They also appeared in Anything Goes in Camp Gordon, Georgia. After Paul left for military service, Jayne Mansfield made her first significant stage appearance in a production of Arthur Miller's Death of a Salesman on October 22, 1953, with the players of the Knox Street Theater, headed by Sidney Lumet.

The Mansfields moved with their daughter, Jayne Marie, to Los Angeles in 1954. Jayne Mansfield sold popcorn at the Stanley Warner Theatre, taught dance, sold candy at a movie theater, modeling part-time at the Blue Book Model Agency, and worked as a photographer at Esther Williams's Trails Restaurant.

Early in Mansfield's career, some advertisers considered her prominent breasts undesirable or inappropriate. She lost her first professional assignment, a General Electric commercial featuring young women in bathing suits relaxing around a pool, having been cropped out of the final photographs. Photographer Gene Lester, who worked on the photoshoot, stated that Mansfield was "too sexy" for the advertisement.

In 1954, Mansfield auditioned at both Paramount Pictures and Warner Bros. For the Paramount audition in April, Mansfield performed a sketch from Joan of Arc for casting director Milton Lewis. Lewis told her she was wasting her "obvious talents" and had her come back a week later to perform the piano scene from The Seven Year Itch. Mansfield failed to impress, but she took the casting director's suggestion that she dye her hair platinum blond. She performed the piano scene for Warner Brothers, but, again, failed to impress.

Mansfield landed her first acting assignment in the CBS series Lux Video Theatre, in the episode "An Angel Went AWOL", aired on October 21, 1954. In it, she sat at a piano and delivered a few lines of dialogue. She was paid $300.

In 1955, the Mansfields separated, although Jayne kept Paul's last name. She said the name "Mansfield" sounded "like a star".

=== Playboy appearances ===
Jayne Mansfield

Playboy centerfold appearance
- February 1955
- Preceded by: Bettie Page
- Succeeded by: Marilyn Waltz

Personal details
- Height: 5 ft 6 in (1.68 m) (5 ft 8 in according to her autopsy)

In December 1953, Hugh Hefner began publishing Playboy. The magazine became a success in part because of the inclusion - without her consent - of Marilyn Monroe, and appearances by Mansfield, Bettie Page, and Anita Ekberg. In February 1955, Mansfield was the Playboy Playmate of the Month, and appeared in the magazine several times. Publication of photos of Mansfield boosted the magazine's circulation and her own career. Shortly afterward, she posed for the Playboy calendar, covering her bare breasts with her hands. Playboy featured Mansfield each February from 1955 to 1958, and again in 1960. In 1964, the magazine repeated the 1955 pictorial. Playboy later reprinted photos from that pictorial issue, with titles such as "The Playboy Portfolio of Sex Stars" in December 1965, and "Centerfolds of the Century" in January 2000.

=== Film ===
Mansfield was paid $150 for her screen debut in Female Jungle (1955), which marked American International Pictures' only venture into film noir. The film starred Lawrence Tierney and John Carradine, and was filmed on a micro-budget. During production, the script was quickly retooled following the reported rape of star Kathleen Crowley so that more emphasis was given to Mansfield. Female Jungle would be rereleased in 1956 as part of a double feature with The Oklahoma Woman just as Mansfield was rising in popularity.

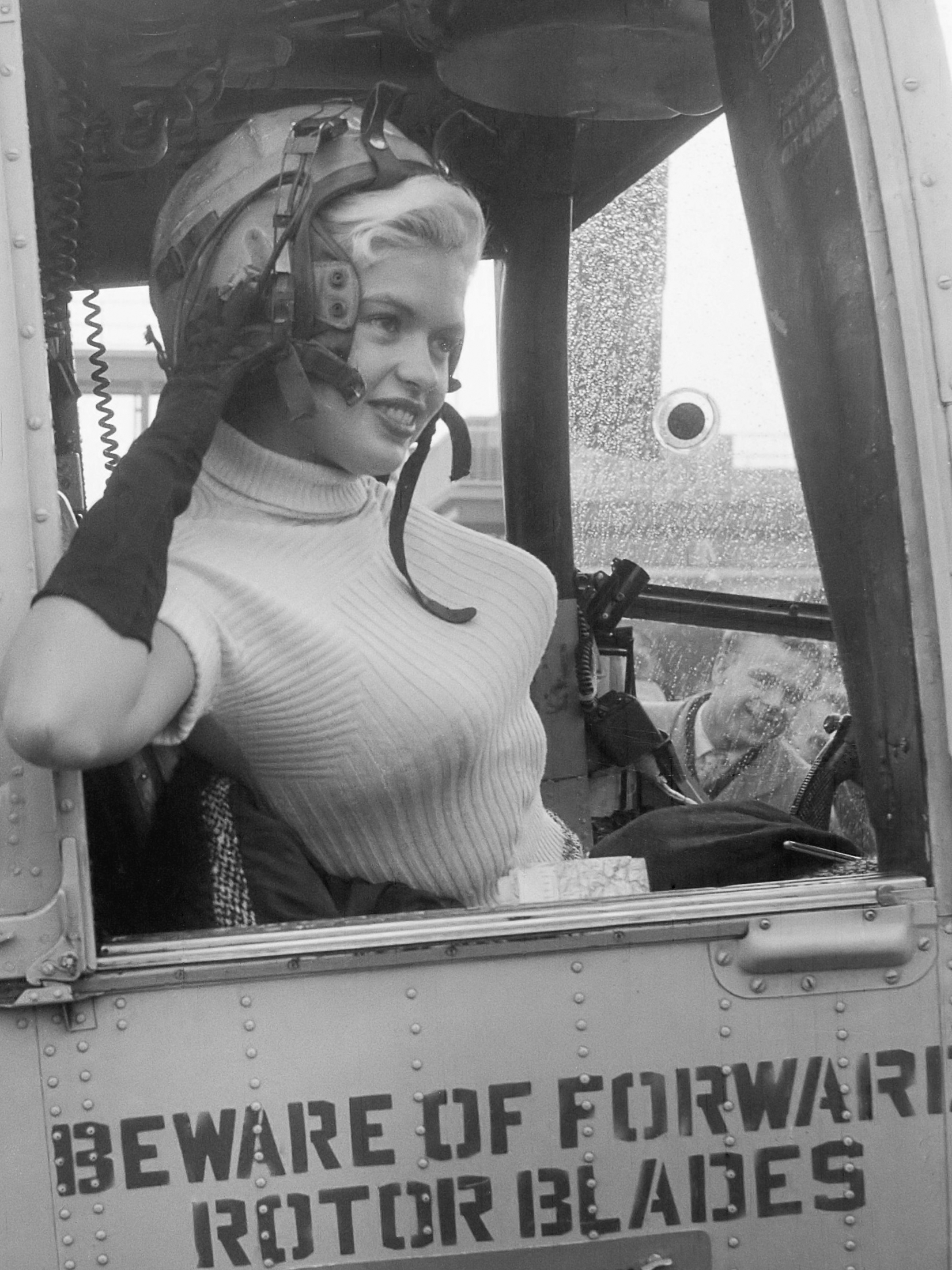
Mansfield on a helicopter to Rotterdam, Netherlands in 1957

In February 1955, James Byron, Mansfield's manager and publicist, negotiated a six-month contract with Warner Brothers, whose executives were intrigued by her appetite for publicity. The contract paid her $250 a week. Mansfield was given bit parts in Pete Kelly's Blues (1955), starring Jack Webb, and Hell on Frisco Bay (1955), starring Alan Ladd. She had a small, but significant role opposite Edward G. Robinson in the courtroom drama Illegal (1955). While her performance in the latter received good notices, her contract was not renewed.

Mansfield secured the opportunity to star on Broadway following her release from Warner Brothers. Mansfield's agent, William Shiffrin, signed her to play fictional film star Rita Marlowe in the Broadway play Will Success Spoil Rock Hunter? with Orson Bean and Walter Matthau. The part had apparently been offered to Marilyn Maxwell, but she declined, as did Mamie Van Doren. Mansfield secured the job after auditioning. Mansfield accepted the part while working on producer Louis W. Kellman's The Burglar (1957), an adaption of the novel of the same name by David Goodis, directed by Paul Wendkos. Produced in film noir-style, she appeared alongside Dan Duryea and Martha Vickers. The Burglar was released two years later, when Mansfield's fame was at its peak. While she was successful in this straight dramatic role, most of Mansfield's subsequent film and television appearances were comedic and capitalized on her sex appeal. It was Kellman's first major venture, and he later took credit for having "discovered" Mansfield.

Mansfield at a USO show in South Korea in 1957

After a slow start, Will Success Spoil Rock Hunter? eventually had a very successful run on Broadway, with Mansfield being singled out in many reviews for her comedic timing and sex appeal. She would win a Theatre World Award in 1956 for being the year's most "Promising Personality" in the theatre. On May 3, 1956, 20th Century Fox signed Mansfield to a six-year contract at a salary of $2,500 a week. The studio saw Mansfield as an "insurance policy" against the very popular, but increasingly difficult Marilyn Monroe, whose persona she had lampooned on stage. At the time, Monroe had walked out on her contract with Fox, refused to make films that had been assigned to her, and had been studying at the Actors Studio in Manhattan. In the meantime, Mansfield was still under contract to perform Will Success Spoil Rock Hunter? on stage until it closed on September 15, 1956.

Mansfield undertook her first starring film role in Frank Tashlin's musical comedy The Girl Can't Help It (1956). Originally titled Do-Re-Mi, it featured a high-profile cast of contemporary rock and roll and R&B artists, including Gene Vincent, Eddie Cochran, Fats Domino, The Platters, and Little Richard, who sang the title song. Her leading man was Tom Ewell, who had starred in The Seven Year Itch the previous year, which had been a big success for Fox. The story concerned the budding romance between a talent agent and a gangster's girlfriend, who he has been hired to promote, despite her apparent lack of talent. The Girl Can't Help It was released in December 1956, and became one of the year's biggest critical and financial successes, earning more than $6.2 million at the box office. It is widely regarded as a classic, and is revered as the "most potent celebration of rock music ever captured on film".

In 1957, Mansfield played a dramatic role in The Wayward Bus, a screen adaptation of John Steinbeck's novel of the same name that co-starred Joan Collins and Dan Dailey. With this film, she attempted to move away from her "blonde bombshell" image by playing a hard-bitten ex-call girl with aspirations for a different future. The film was a modest success, and Mansfield won a Golden Globe in 1957 for "New Star of the Year", beating Carroll Baker and Natalie Wood with her performance as a "wistful derelict". It was "generally conceded to have been her best acting", according to The New York Times, in a fitful career hampered by her flamboyant image, distinctive voice ("a soft-voiced coo punctuated with squeals"), voluptuous figure, and limited acting range.

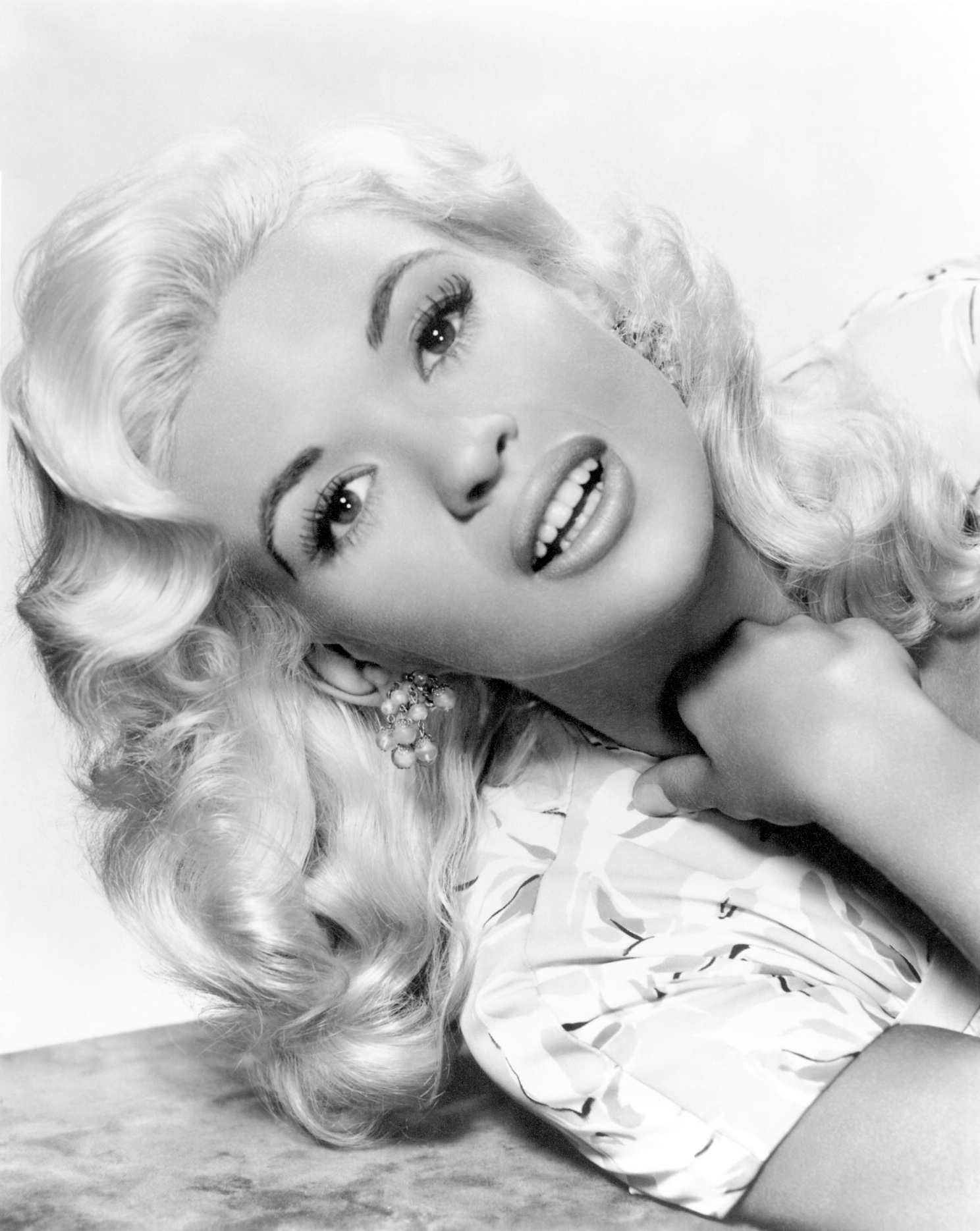
Promotional photo for Kiss Them for Me (1957)

Mansfield would next star in the film version of the Broadway show Will Success Spoil Rock Hunter?, released in 1957, reprising her role of Rita Marlowe alongside co-stars Tony Randall, Joan Blondell, Betsy Drake, John Williams, and her real-life romantic interest, muscleman Mickey Hargitay. Frank Tashlin wrote a mostly original screenplay, keeping little more than Mansfield's character and the title of the stage show, and instead shifted the focus to a satire of television advertisement. Fox sent Mansfield on a North American promotional tour and a 40-day, 16-country tour of Europe. She attended the premiere of the film (released as Oh! For a Man in the UK) in London, and met Queen Elizabeth II. It was another critical and box office success, earning more than $4.9 million.

Mansfield's fourth starring role in a Hollywood studio film was in Stanley Donen's screen version of Kiss Them for Me (1957), for which she received prominent billing alongside Cary Grant. In the film itself, however, she is little more than comic relief, while Grant's character relates more to a redhead played by fashion model Suzy Parker. Based on the mildly successful 1945 stage play, the film was ultimately a critical and box office flop at the time of release. It would be one of Fox's final attempts to publicize Mansfield.

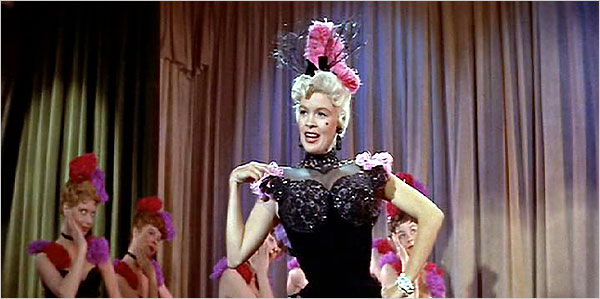
Mansfield in The Sheriff of Fractured Jaw (1958)

Her next film, The Sheriff of Fractured Jaw (1958), was a comedic Western filmed on location in Spain. In the film, Mansfield's three songs were dubbed by singer Connie Francis. Fox financed the production, and would release it in the United States in 1959. Variety noted that the on-screen pairing of Mansfield and British actor Kenneth More was a "good turn" for moviegoers, and the film was a financial success, especially in England. In the meantime, Columbia Pictures offered Mansfield the female lead opposite James Stewart and Jack Lemmon in the romantic comedy Bell, Book and Candle (1958), but she had to turn it down due to pregnancy. Fox had attempted to cast Mansfield opposite Paul Newman in Rally 'Round the Flag, Boys! (1958), his ill-fated first attempt at comedy, but the role was given to Joan Collins. Mansfield would pursue a role in Holiday for Lovers (1959), but Fox passed her over.

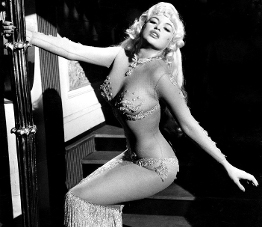
Mansfield in Too Hot to Handle (1960)

The continuing publicity related to Mansfield's physical attributes failed to sustain her career. Her over-publicity eventually led to overexposure, and Fox soon stopped viewing and promoting her as a mainstream star. Instead of continuing to conceive projects for Mansfield, the studio began loaning her out to make films overseas. The first of these were two independent gangster films shot in the United Kingdom: The Challenge with Anthony Quayle and Too Hot to Handle with Leo Genn and Christopher Lee, both released in 1960. Both films were shot quickly, and would generate controversy when they were eventually released in the United States. While originally shot in color, Too Hot to Handle would be converted into black-and-white for its American release in 1961. This change was made to appease American censors, who objected to a scene in which Mansfield, wearing silver netting with sequins painted over her nipples, appears nearly nude. Likewise, there was a scene in The Challenge where Mansfield briefly appeared topless that caused a minor uproar from American censors, although there was no significant change made to the scene prior to the film's American distribution in 1963. She and Mickey Hargitay would then star together in the international production of The Loves of Hercules (1960), where Mansfield played a dual role. The film would eventually reach a worldwide audience following its rerelease in 1966.

Fox would then cast Mansfield in It Happened in Athens with Trax Colton, a handsome newcomer the studio had plucked from obscurity and was trying to mold into a heartthrob. While Mansfield received top billing, she was featured in just a scantily-clad supporting role, with Colton playing the lead. The film focused on the first Olympic Games, and was shot in Greece in 1960. It would ultimately be released in June 1962 to help Fox recoup their financial investment into the costly production of Cleopatra (1963), starring Elizabeth Taylor. By the time the film was released, Mansfield had already been released from her contract with Fox. Mansfield then appeared in The George Raft Story (1961) for Allied Artists, where she received top billing with Ray Danton, despite having minimal screentime as a fictional movie star modeled after Betty Grable. It was her first film shot and produced in Hollywood since 1957.

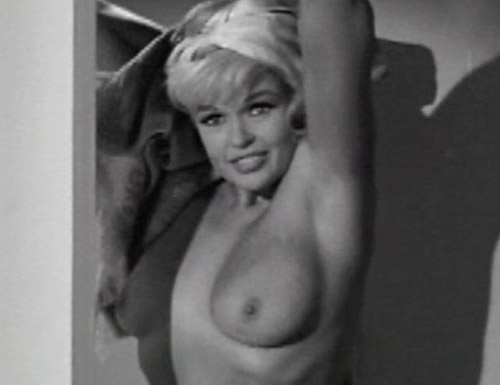
Mansfield nude in Promises! Promises! (1963)

Tommy Noonan persuaded Mansfield to become the first mainstream American actress to appear nude in a starring role, in the film Promises! Promises! (1963). Playboy published nude photographs of Mansfield on set in its June 1963 issue, resulting in obscenity charges being filed against Hugh Hefner in a Chicago court. Promises! Promises! was banned in Cleveland, Ohio, but enjoyed box office success elsewhere. As a result of its success, Mansfield landed on the Top 10 list of box-office attractions for that year.

Throughout the 1960s, Mansfield appeared in several foreign films. In the summer of 1962, she would make Panic Button in Italy, appearing alongside Maurice Chevalier, Eleanor Parker, and Mike Connors. It would go unreleased until 1964. In 1963, she filmed two productions in Germany. The first was Homesick for St. Pauli (1963) starring Australian singer Freddy Quinn. The latter would be Dog Eat Dog (1964), a crime drama about multiple people fighting over stolen money on a small, reclusive island, with a cast including Cameron Mitchell, Ivor Salter, Dodie Heath, and Isa Miranda. During production, Mansfield was pregnant with her daughter, future actress Mariska Hargitay. The following year, she appeared in Primitive Love (1964), another Italian production, co-starring with Franco Franchi and Mickey Hargitay. The film attempted to blend a standard bedroom comedy with the mondo film genre that was rapidly gaining popularity at the time.

Mansfield filmed Single Room Furnished in 1966, directed by her third husband Matt Cimber, whom she had married in 1964. She portrayed a woman who evolves from innocence into prostitution. The film was released briefly in 1966, but did not enjoy wide distribution until 1968, more than a year after Mansfield's death. It was publicly endorsed by columnist Walter Winchell, who was close friends with Mansfield, as containing her finest screen performance. Winchell would film an introduction to be used at the beginning of the film when it went into theaters to solidify his endorsement of Mansfield's performance.

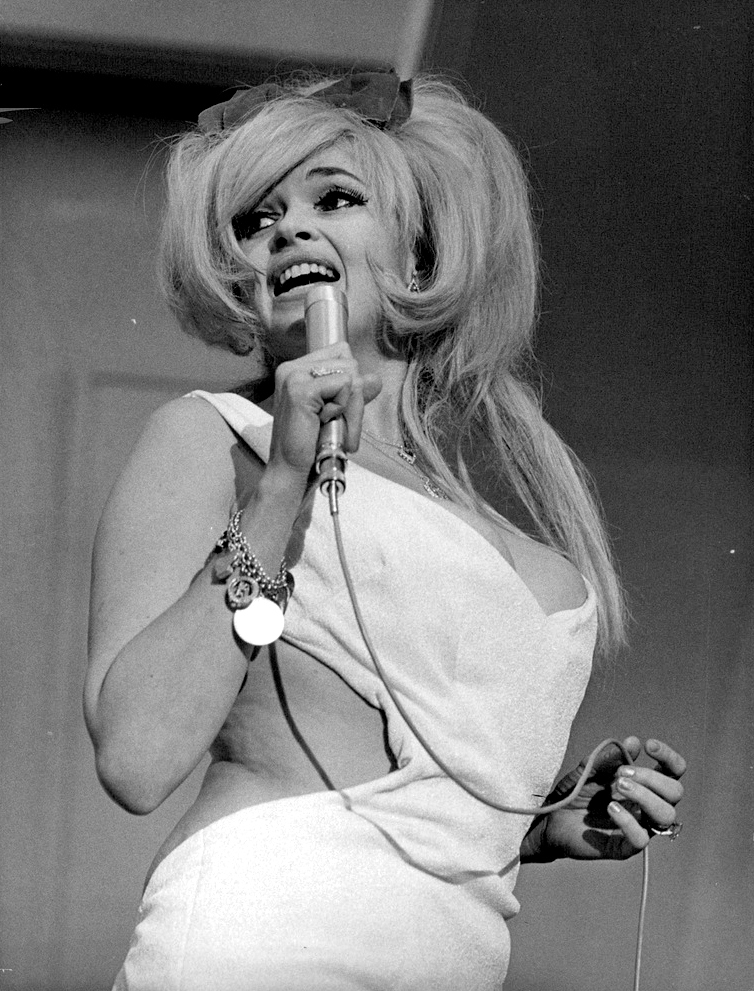
Mansfield in May 1967

After filming on Single Room Furnished wrapped, Mansfield was cast opposite Mamie Van Doren and Ferlin Husky in the low-budget comedy The Las Vegas Hillbillys (1966). She promoted the film by going on a 29-day tour of major American cities, accompanied by Husky, Don Bowman, and other country musicians that were featured in the film. Before filming, Mansfield said she would not "share any screen time with the drive-in's answer to Marilyn Monroe", in reference to Van Doren. Their characters did share one scene together, but Mansfield and Van Doren reportedly filmed their parts at different times and the footage was edited together in post-production. She also had a role in The Fat Spy (1966), a Z-movie with Phyllis Diller and Jack E. Leonard, which had a short run in theaters. After falling into the public domain in the 1990s, however, it has been heavily circulated, helping to earn its status as a camp classic.

Mansfield's last film role was a cameo in A Guide for the Married Man (1967), a bedroom farce concerning the adventures of a married man with a wandering eye, starring Walter Matthau, Robert Morse, and Inger Stevens. The opening credits listed Mansfield as one of the "technical advisers", along with Lucille Ball, Jack Benny, Polly Bergen, Joey Bishop, Sid Caesar, Art Carney, and Wally Cox. Mansfield shared a single scene with comedian Terry-Thomas, where the two are engaged in an adulterous fling during which she misplaces her bra. The film was released just a month before her death.

=== Television ===
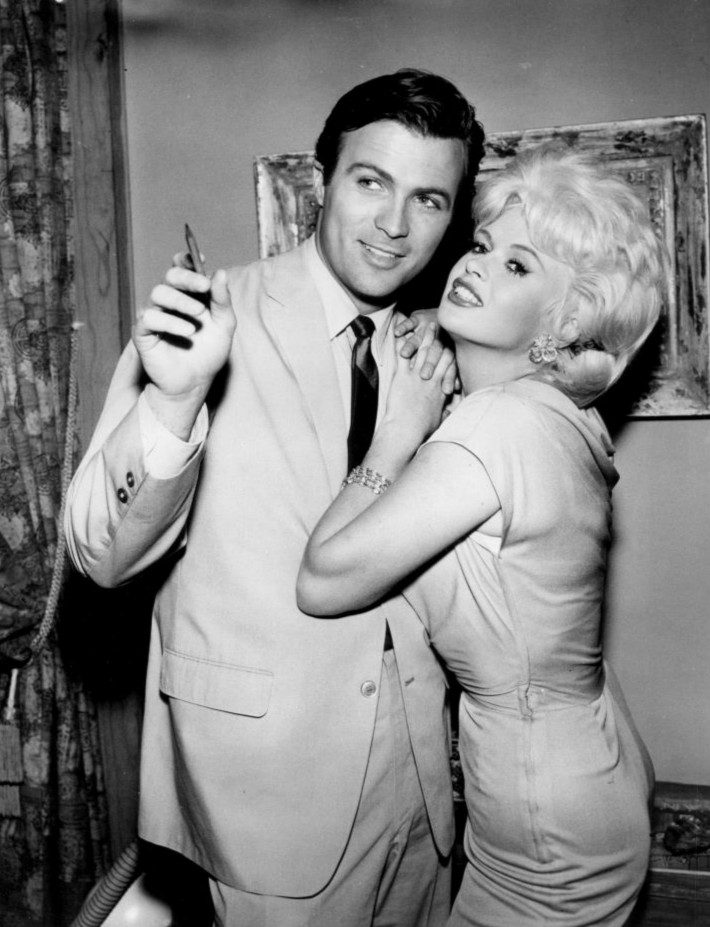
Mansfield and Barry Coe in Follow the Sun (1961)

Mansfield played her first leading role on television in 1956 on NBC's The Bachelor. In her first appearance on British television in 1957, she recited from Shakespeare (including a line from Hamlet) (Note: Original text from Hamlet (Act I, Scene II): "O, that this too too solid flesh would melt, Thaw, and resolve itself into a dew.") and played piano and violin. Her performances in television dramas included episodes of Burke's Law, Alfred Hitchcock Presents, The Red Skelton Hour (three episodes), Kraft Mystery Theater, and Follow the Sun. Mansfield's performance in Follow the Sun ("The Dumbest Blonde"; Season 1, Episode 21; February 4, 1962; produced by 20th Century Fox Television) was hailed as the advent of "a new and dramatic Jayne Mansfield". She appeared on a number of game shows, including Down You Go, The Match Game, and What's My Line?

She performed in a number of variety shows, including The Jack Benny Program (on which she played violin), The Steve Allen Show, and The Jackie Gleason Show (in the mid-1960s, when the show was the second-highest-rated program in the U.S.). In November 1957, on a special episode of NBC's The Perry Como Show ("Holiday in Las Vegas"), one of her nightclub acts was featured, something quite scandalous for the audience according to the broadcaster. She was a headlining guest for three Bob Hope television specials. In 1957, she toured United States Pacific Command areas in Hawaii, Okinawa, Guam, Tokyo, and Korea with Bob Hope for the USO for 13 days, appearing as a comedian; in 1961, she toured Newfoundland, Labrador, and Baffin Island for a Christmas special. She made many appearances on talk shows, which she appreciated for the publicity. One of her more notable appearances on a variety show was on The Ed Sullivan Show (Season 10, Episode 35; May 26, 1957), right after her success with Rock Hunter; she played violin with a six-person backup band. After the show she exclaimed, "Now I am really national. Momma and Dallas see the Ed Sullivan show!" According to Nielsen, the episode was watched in 13,400,000 homes, reaching 34% of the total audience, almost 30 million viewers.

By 1958, she earned $20,000 per episode for television performances. In 1963, Mansfield turned down the role of Ginger Grant on the sitcom Gilligan's Island. Although her acting roles were becoming marginalized, Mansfield rejected the part as it epitomized the stereotype she wished to leave behind. The part went to Tina Louise. She would star in The Jayne Mansfield Show in 1965, an unsold pilot for a half-hour comedy series where she would play a fictionalized version of herself, a celebrity manipulated by the media. The episode aired as a television special.

In June 1967, ten days before her death in a car accident, she read To the Virgins, to Make Much of Time, a poem by Robert Herrick about early death, on The Joey Bishop Show – her last television appearance. (Note: Original text of To the Virgins, to Make Much of Time by Robert Herrick: "Gather ye rosebuds while ye may, Old Time is still a-flying; And this same flower that smiles today, Tomorrow will be dying.")

As late as the mid-1980s, Mansfield as a figure drew audiences on television in fictional dramas portraying her and documentary productions with historic footage. In 1980, The Jayne Mansfield Story aired on CBS, starring Loni Anderson as Mansfield and Arnold Schwarzenegger as Mickey Hargitay. It was nominated for three Emmy Awards. The A+E Networks TV series Biography featured her in the episode Jayne Mansfield: Blonde Ambition. It won an Emmy Award in the outstanding nonfiction TV series category in 2001. A&E also dramatized her life in the TV serial, Dangerous Curves, in 1999. In 1988, her story and archival footage were part of the TV documentary Hollywood Sex Symbols.

== Other ventures ==
=== Stage appearances ===
Between 1951 and 1953, Mansfield acted in The Slaves of Demon Rum, Ten Nights in a Barroom, Macbeth, and Anything Goes. Her performance in an October 1953 production of Arthur Miller's Death of a Salesman attracted Paramount Pictures to audition her. Lumet trained her for the audition. In 1955, she went to New York and appeared in the Broadway production of George Axelrod's comedy Will Success Spoil Rock Hunter?, also featuring Orson Bean and Walter Matthau. It was her first major stage performance, garnering her critical attention which was not always positive. She starred as Rita Marlowe (a wild, blonde Hollywood starlet à la Monroe) in the musical spoofing Hollywood in general and Marilyn Monroe in particular. Her wardrobe, a bath towel, caused a sensation. She received a Theatre World Award (Promising Personality) for her performance in 1956, as well as a Golden Globe Award (New Star of the year, Actress) in 1957. Brooks Atkinson of the New York Times described the "commendable abandon" of her scantily-clad rendition of Rita Marlowe in the play as "a platinum-pated movie siren with the wavy contours of Marilyn Monroe". She performed in about 450 shows between 1955 and 1956.

In May 1964, Mansfield starred in the stage production of Bus Stop at Yonkers Playhouse, co-starring Mickey Hargitay and Ann B. Davis. The play had a three week engagement that ended on June 14.

Mansfield toured U.S. towns alternating between Bus Stop and Gentlemen Prefer Blondes. In 1965, she performed in another pair of plays: Rabbit Habit at the Latin Quarter nightclub and Champagne Complex, directed by Matt Cimber, at the Pabst Theater. Both plays received poor reviews.

=== Nightclubs ===
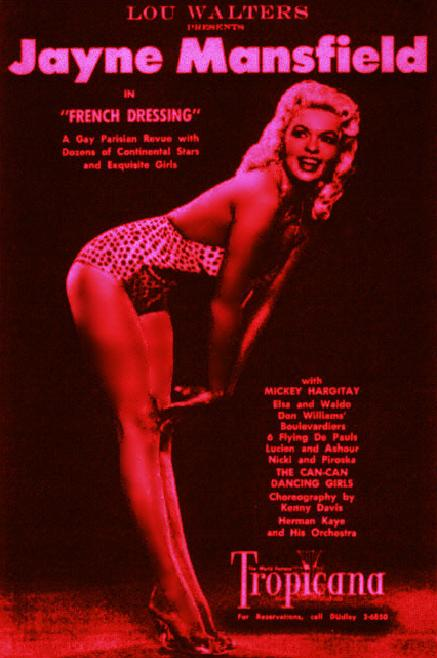
Mansfield in a promotional poster for the night club act French Dressing (1966)

In February 1958, the Tropicana Las Vegas launched Mansfield's striptease revue The Tropicana Holiday (produced by Monte Proser and co-starring Mansfield's then-husband, Mickey Hargitay) under a four-week contract that was extended to eight. The opening night raised $20,000 for March of Dimes. She received $25,000 per week for her performance as Trixie Divoon in the show, while her contract with 20th Century Fox was paying her $2,500 per week. She had a million-dollar policy with Lloyd's of London in case Hargitay dropped her as he whirled her around for the show. In 1959, Jayne returned to the Tropicana with her show being extended from a four-week run to eight when Betty Hutton's engagement there failed to materialize. In December 1960, the Dunes hotel and casino launched Mansfield's revue The House of Love (produced by Jack Cole, co-starring Hargitay). She received a salary of $35,000 a week, the highest of her career.

Her wardrobe for the shows at Tropicana and Dunes featured a gold mesh dress with sequins to cover her nipples and pubic region. The controversial dress was called "Jayne Mansfield and a few sequins". In early 1963, she performed in her first club engagement outside Las Vegas, at the Plantation Supper Club in Greensboro, North Carolina, earning $23,000 in a week, and then at Iroquois Gardens in Louisville, Kentucky. She returned to Las Vegas in 1966, but her show was staged on Fremont Street, away from the Strip the Tropicana and Dunes. Her last nightclub act, French Dressing, was at the Latin Quarter in New York in 1966, also repeated at the Tropicana. It was a modified version of the Tropicana show and ran for six weeks with reasonable success.

Her nightclub career inspired films, documentaries, and a musical album. 20th Century Fox Records recorded "The House of Love" for the album Jayne Mansfield Busts Up Las Vegas in 1962. She played the roles of burlesque entertainer Midnight Franklin in Too Hot to Handle (1960) and Las Vegas showgirl Tawny Downs in The Las Vegas Hillbillys (1966). In 1967, the independent documentary Spree (alternative title Las Vegas by Night), about the antics of Las Vegas entertainers, was released. The film, narrated as a part of a travelogue of Vic Damone and Juliet Prowse, featured Mansfield, Hargitay, Constance Moore, and Clara Ward as guest stars. Mansfield strips and sings "Promise Her Anything" from the film Promises! Promises! A court order prohibited using any of the guest stars to promote the film.

Later in her career, Mansfield was busier on stage, performing and making appearances with her nightclub acts, club engagements, and performance tours. By 1960, she had made personal appearances for everything from supermarket promotions to drugstore openings, at $10,000 per appearance.

=== Musical work ===
Jayne Mansfield
- Genres: Country, pop
- Occupation: Singer
- Years active: 1954–1967
- Labels: 20th Century Fox, MGM, London, Polydor

Mansfield had classical training in piano and violin. She sang in film soundtracks and on stage for her theatrical and nightclub performances, and released singles and albums. After her death, she became an inspiration for punk-rock musicians.

==== Soundtracks ====
Mansfield sang or her singing was dubbed in some of her films including The Sheriff of Fractured Jaw and Promises! Promises!.

Her screen performance of songs in The Sheriff of Fractured Jaw was actually dubbed by Connie Francis.

==== Live performances ====
In 1958, an orchestra was recorded for the 31st Academy Awards ceremony with Jack Benny on first violin, Mansfield on violin, Dick Powell on trumpet, Robert Mitchum on woodwind, Fred Astaire on drums, and Jerry Lewis as conductor, but the performance was canceled. She sang "Too Marvelous for Words" for The Jack Benny Program ("Jack Takes Boat to Hawaii"; Episode 9, Season 14; November 26, 1963). Her club performances regularly featured songs like Call Me, A Little Brains, A Little Talent ("This Queen has her aces in all the right places"), Plain Jane, Quando-Quando, Bésame Mucho, and the song Marilyn Monroe made famous, Diamonds Are a Girl's Best Friend.

==== Albums and singles ====
Jayne Mansfield discography
- Studio albums: 2
- Singles: 6

In 1962, 20th Century Fox Records released the album Jayne Mansfield Busts Up Las Vegas, a recording of her Las Vegas revue The House of Love. In 1964 MGM Records released the novelty album Jayne Mansfield: Shakespeare, Tchaikovsky & Me, in which Mansfield recited Shakespeare's sonnets and poems by Marlowe, Browning, Wordsworth, and others against a background of Tchaikovsky's music. The album cover depicted a bouffant-coiffed Mansfield with lips pursed and breasts barely covered by a fur stole, posing between busts of Tchaikovsky and Shakespeare. The New York Times described the album as a reading of "30-odd poems in a husky, urban, baby voice". The reviewer wrote, "Miss Mansfield is a lady with apparent charms, but reading poetry is not one of them."

In 1965, Jimi Hendrix played bass and added lead in his session musician days for Mansfield on two songs, "As The Clouds Drift By" and "Suey", released as a 45-rpm single by London Records in 1966. Ed Chalpin, the record producer, claimed that Mansfield played all the instruments on the singles. According to Hendrix historian Steven Roby (Black Gold: The Lost Archives Of Jimi Hendrix, Billboard Books), this collaboration occurred because they shared a manager. "Wo ist der Mann", sung in German and released by Polydor Records in Austria, was much in demand immediately after its release in August 1963. The A-side featured Hans Last's "Snicksnack-Snuckelchen". In 1964, the Original Sound label released two original songs from the soundtrack of The Las Vegas Hillbillys, "That Makes It" (an answer to The Big Bopper's "Chantilly Lace") on the A-side and "Little Things Mean a Lot" on the B-side.

== Personal life ==
=== Marriages, children, and affairs ===
Mansfield was allegedly intimately involved with many men, including Claude Terrail (owner of the Paris restaurant Tour d'Argent), John F. Kennedy, Robert F. Kennedy, and Brazilian billionaire Jorge Guinle. She met John F. Kennedy through his brother-in-law Peter Lawford in Palm Springs, California, in 1960. In 1967, film critic Whitney Williams wrote of Mansfield in Variety: "Her personal life out-rivaled any of the roles she played".

Mansfield (then Jayne Palmer) met Paul Mansfield at a party on Christmas Eve in 1949. She was a popular student at Highland Park High School, and he was a student at Sunset High School in Dallas. On May 6, 1950, the couple married in Fort Worth, Texas. At the time of their marriage, Jayne Mansfield was 17 years of age and was three months pregnant, while Paul Mansfield was 20 years of age. (Some sources state that the couple married on May 10, 1950. According to biographer Raymond Strait, the couple had secretly married on January 28, after which time Jayne Mansfield conceived their child.) On November 8, 1950, Jayne Mansfield gave birth to her daughter, Jayne Marie Mansfield. Some sources say that her pregnancy resulted from date rape.

In 1952, Jayne Mansfield juggled motherhood and classes at the University of Texas. Early in 1952, Paul Mansfield was called to the United States Army Reserve for the Korean War. While he served in the army, she spent a year at Camp Gordon, Georgia. Paul Mansfield hoped their child's birth would discourage Jayne's interest in acting. When it did not, he agreed to move to Los Angeles in 1954 to further her career. Once in California, the couple lived in a small apartment in Van Nuys, Los Angeles with Jayne's pets: a great dane; three cats; two chihuahuas; a poodle dyed pink; and a rabbit. Jayne Marie was left in the care of her maternal grandparents.

After a series of arguments about Jayne's ambitions, infidelity, and animals, the Mansfields decided to dissolve their marriage. They separated in 1955. Jayne filed for separate maintenance in February 1955 and filed for divorce in California in 1956. Paul filed for divorce in 1957 in Texas, citing mental cruelty. In August 1956, Paul sought custody of Jayne Marie, alleging that Jayne was an unfit mother because she had appeared nude in Playboy; however, his attempt failed. The Mansfields received their divorce papers on January 8, 1958. Following the divorce, Jayne kept "Mansfield" as her professional name. After turning 18, Jayne Marie stated that she had not received her inheritance from the Mansfield estate or heard from her father since her mother's death.

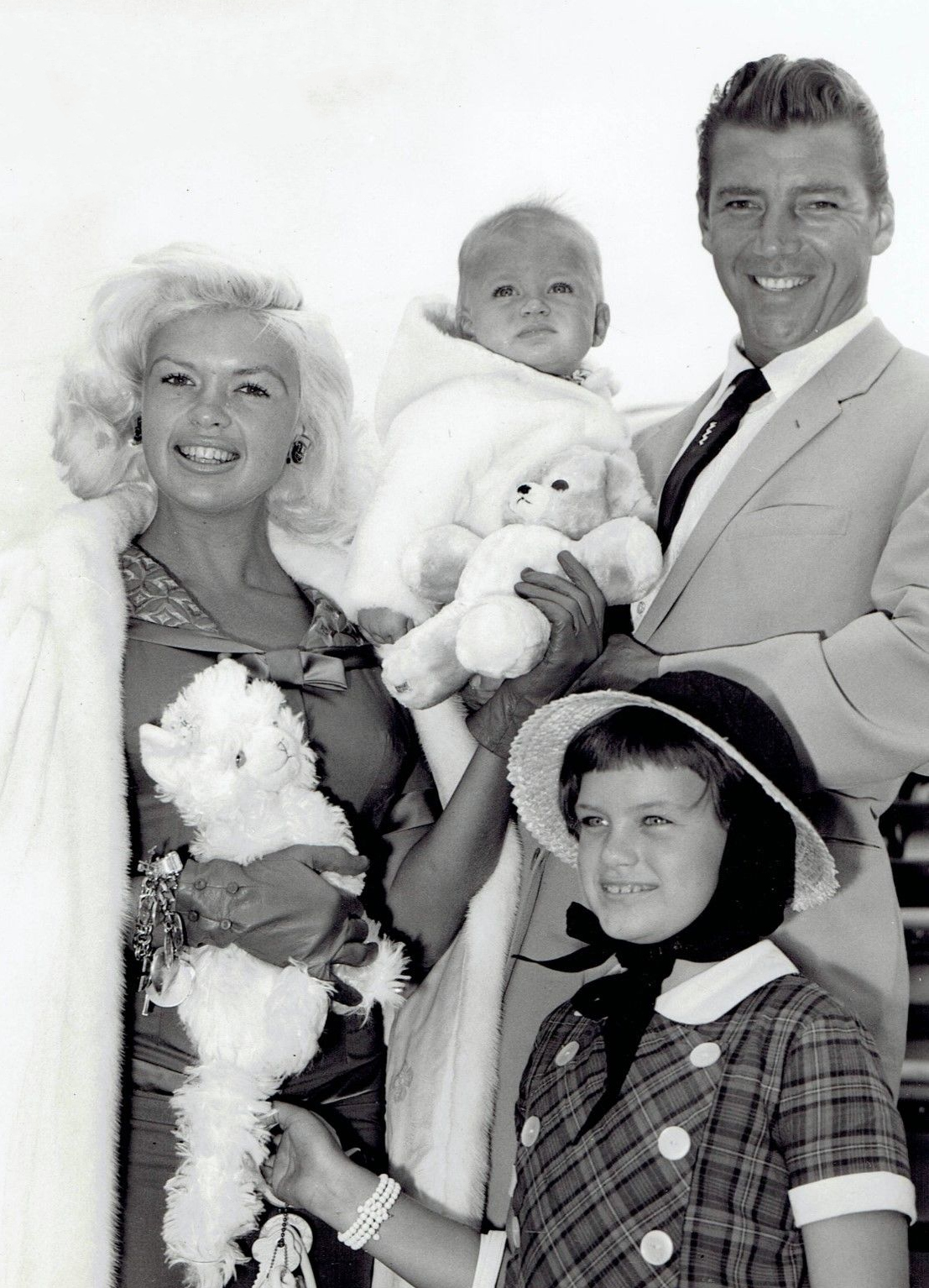
Mansfield with Hargitay and children in London in 1959

Jayne Mansfield met her second husband, Mickey Hargitay, at the Latin Quarter nightclub in New York City on May 13, 1956, where he was performing as a member of the chorus line in Mae West's show. Hargitay was an actor and bodybuilder who won the Mr. Universe competition in 1955. Mansfield fell for him immediately, which resulted in a squabble with West.

After Mansfield returned from her 40-day European tour, Hargitay proposed to her on November 6, 1957 with a 10-carat diamond ring. On January 13, 1958 (days after her divorce from Paul Mansfield was finalized), Mansfield married Hargitay at the Wayfarers Chapel in Rancho Palos Verdes, California. The unique glass chapel made public and press viewing of the wedding easy. Mansfield wore a pink, skin-tight wedding gown made of sequins with a 30 yd (27 m) flounce of pink tulle (designed by a 20th Century-Fox costume designer). At the reception, Mansfield had Hargitay drink pink champagne.

Mansfield and Hargitay appeared together on screen and stage. Mansfield and Hargitay also appeared on television shows such as the Bob Hope Specials. They had a number of business holdings, including the Hargitay Exercise Equipment Company, Jayne Mansfield Productions, and Eastland Savings and Loan. She co-wrote the autobiographical book Jayne Mansfield's Wild, Wild World with Hargitay. It contained 32 pages of black-and-white photographs printed on glossy paper. The couple had two sons, Miklós Jeffrey Hargitay (born December 21, 1958) and Zoltán Anthony Hargitay (born August 1, 1960).

In 1962, Mansfield had a well-publicized affair with Enrico Bomba, the Italian producer and production manager of her film Panic Button. Hargitay accused Bomba of sabotaging their marriage.

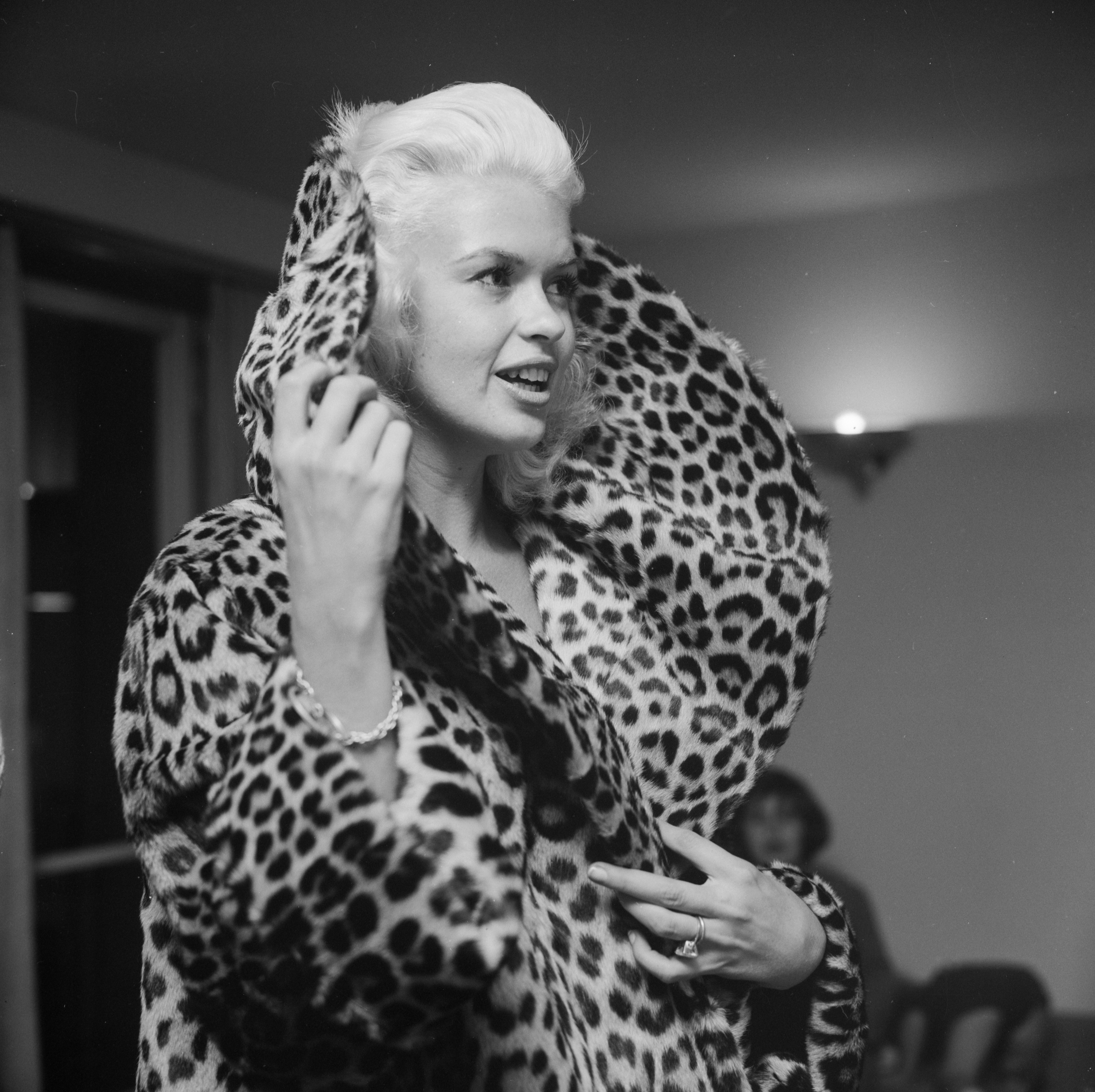
Mansfield in Kloten, Switzerland, in 1960

In 1963, Mansfield had an affair with Brazilian-born comedian-singer Nelson Sardelli. Mansfield indicated that she planned to marry Sardelli when her divorce from Hargitay was finalized. On April 30, 1963, Mansfield obtained a divorce from Hargitay in Juarez, Mexico; Sardelli accompanied Mansfield to Juarez. She had previously filed for divorce on May 4, 1962, but told reporters, "I'm sure we will make it up." Her relationship with Sardelli ended in June 1963.

Mansfield reconciled with Mickey Hargitay in October 1963 after she discovered that she was pregnant. Mansfield's daughter, Mariska Magdolna Hargitay, was born on January 23, 1964. As an adult, Mariska revealed that Sardelli is her biological father. After Mariska was born, Mansfield sued to get the Juarez divorce declared legal; the divorce was recognized on August 26, 1964. Mansfield once told Hargitay on a television talk show that she was sorry for all the trouble she had caused him.

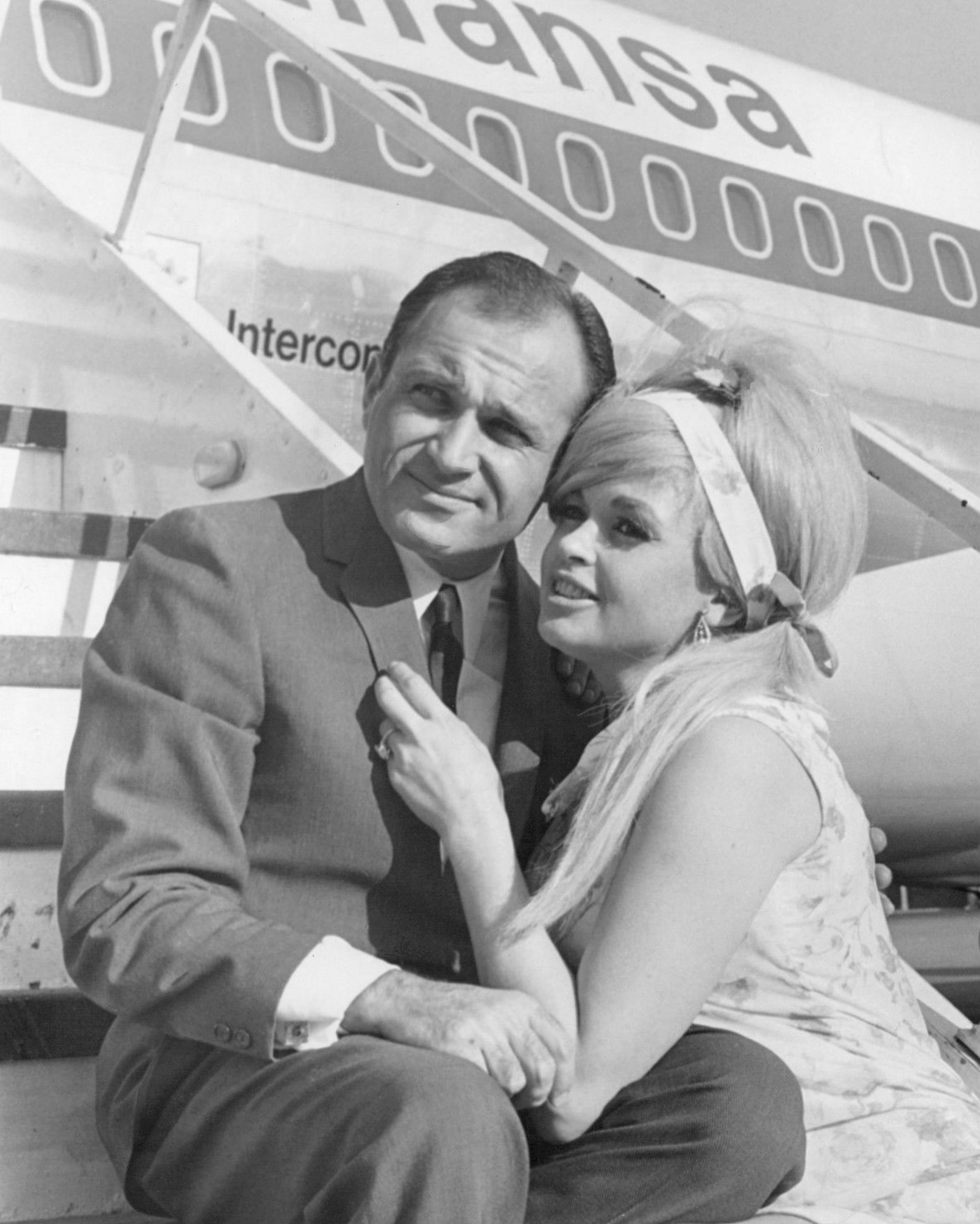
Mansfield with attorney and boyfriend Sam Brody, Germany, 1967

Mansfield became involved with Matt Cimber (a.k.a. Matteo Ottaviano, né Thomas Vitale Ottaviano), an Italian-born film director, when he directed her in a stage production of Bus Stop in Yonkers, New York, costarring Hargitay. Mansfield married Cimber on September 24, 1964, in Mulegé, Baja California Sur, Mexico. Cimber managed Mansfield's career during their marriage. The marriage began to collapse in the wake of Cimber's alleged physical abuse as well as Mansfield's alcohol abuse, open infidelities, and disclosure to Cimber that she had been happy only with Sardelli. They separated on July 11, 1965 and filed for divorce on July 20, 1966. The couple had a son, Antonio Raphael Ottaviano (a.k.a. Tony Cimber, born October 18, 1965). Cimber and his second wife, dress designer Christy Hilliard Hanak, raised Tony Cimber.

In July 1966, Mansfield started living with her attorney, Sam Brody, who had frequent drunken brawls with her and mistreated her daughter Jayne Marie. In the 2025 documentary My Mom Jayne, Jayne Marie, Mansfield's son Zoltán Hargitay, and Mickey Hargitay's wife Ellen recalled instances where Mansfield showed signs of having been physically abused by Brody. Brody's wife, Beverly, filed for divorce, calling Mansfield the "41st other woman" in Brody's life. This relationship is also well-featured in the 2017 stylized documentary Mansfield 66/67 examining the pop-culture rumors and legends surrounding her final years, featuring archival materials alongside interviews with contemporaries like Mamie Van Doren, and fans of her legacy like John Waters and Tippi Hedren.

Mansfield's son Zoltán made news when a lion attacked him and bit his neck while he and his mother visited the theme park Jungleland USA in Thousand Oaks, California, on November 23, 1966. He suffered severe head trauma, underwent three surgeries at Community Memorial Hospital in Ventura, California, including a six-hour brain surgery, and contracted meningitis. He recovered, and Brody sued the theme park on the family's behalf for $1.6 million. The publicity led to the theme park's closure.

In June 1967, two weeks before her mother's death, 16-year-old Jayne Marie accused Brody of beating her. Her statement to the Los Angeles Police Department implicated her mother in encouraging the abuse, and days later a juvenile court judge awarded temporary custody of Jayne Marie to Paul Mansfield's uncle William W. Pigue and his wife Mary.

A June 1967 court decree made Mickey Hargitay the guardian of Mickey Jr., Zoltán and Mariska Hargitay, though they continued to live with Mansfield. Shortly after Mansfield's funeral, Hargitay sued her estate, but lost. Hargitay married airline stewardess Ellen Siano in 1968. He and Ellen went on to raise Mickey Jr., Zoltán and Mariska.

=== Religion ===
In August 1963, Mansfield decided to convert to Catholicism. Although she never actually converted, she attended Catholic services when in Europe and followed Catholic practices when involved with Catholic partners (including Hargitay, Sardelli, and Cimber). In May 1967, her performance at the Mount Brandon Hotel in Tralee, Ireland, was canceled because Catholic clergy condemned it. She wanted to marry Matt Cimber in a Catholic ceremony, but was unable to find a priest to officiate. While involved with Sam Brody, she also showed interest in Judaism.

In San Francisco for the city's 1966 Film Festival, Mansfield and Brody visited the Church of Satan to meet Anton LaVey, the church's founder. He awarded Mansfield a medallion and the title "High Priestess of San Francisco's Church of Satan." The media enthusiastically covered the meeting and the events surrounding it, identifying Mansfield as a Satanist and speculating that she was romantically involved with LaVey. This urban legend and her relationship with LaVey became the central focus of the 2017 documentary Mansfield 66/67. However, Mansfield also definitively repudiated being a Satanist in the media. In a press release accompanying the Mansfield/LaVey photos of Walter Fischer, Mansfield is quoted: “It is very interesting. I know the real basis of [LaVey’s] church. I think he is a genius and I regard him as an interesting person. I am a Catholic and would not believe in his church. I am not a member of the black circle.”

== Public image ==
=== Influence ===
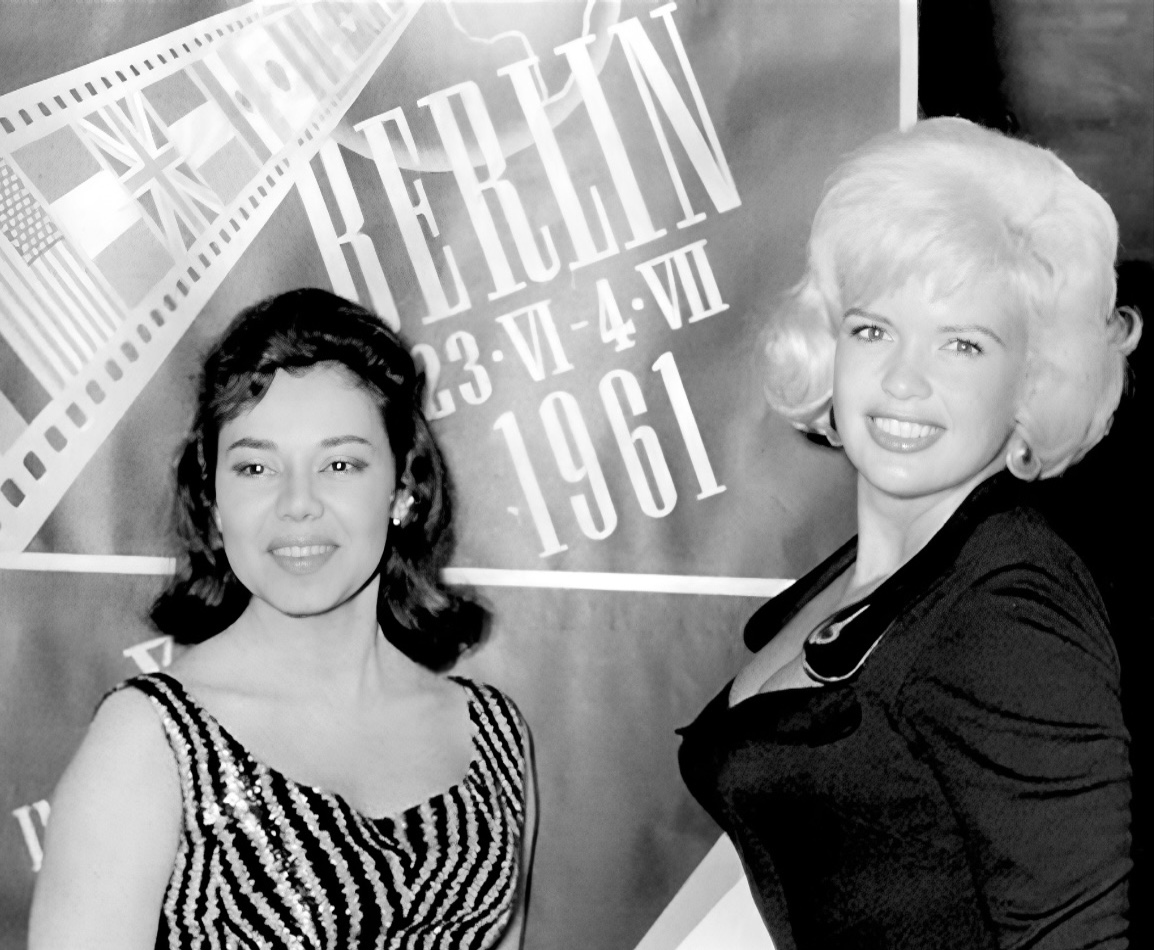
Mansfield posing with Egyptian actress Magda at the 11th Berlin International Film Festival, 1961

Mansfield was a major Hollywood sex symbol of the 1950s and early 1960s and 20th Century Fox's alternative to Marilyn Monroe. She came to be known as the "Working Man's Monroe". She was one of Hollywood's original blonde bombshells, and remains one of the most recognizable icons of 1950s celebrity culture.

According to Hollywood historian and biographer James Parish, Mansfield's hourglass figure (she claimed dimensions of 40–21–35), unique sashaying walk, breathy baby talk, and cleavage-revealing costumes made an enduring impact. Hollywood historian Andrew Nelson said that she was seen as Hollywood's gaudiest, boldest, D-cupped, B-grade actress from 1955 until the early 1960s.

Frequent references have been made to Mansfield's very high IQ, which she claimed was 163. In addition to English, she spoke four other languages. She learned French, Spanish, and German in high school, and in 1963 she studied Italian. Reputed to be Hollywood's "smartest dumb blonde", she later complained that the public did not care about her brain, saying: "They're more interested in 40–21–35", a reference to her body measurements.

=== Trademarks ===
==== Blonde ====
A natural brunette, Mansfield had her hair bleached and colored platinum blonde when she moved to Los Angeles, and became one of the early "blonde bombshells", along with Marilyn Monroe, Betty Grable, and Mamie Van Doren. In 1958, she also had her eyebrows dyed platinum. Following Jean Harlow (who started the trend with her film Bombshell), Monroe, Mansfield, and Van Doren helped establish the stereotype typified by a combination of curvaceous physique, very light-colored hair, and a perceived lack of intelligence. A review of English-language tabloids shows it to be one of the most persistent blonde stereotypes along with busty blonde, and blonde babe. Mansfield has been called the "ultimate dumb blonde", while one biographer said, "Of all the women the played dumb blondes in the fifties, Mansfield worked the hardest to be the dumbest and the blondest."

Mansfield and Monroe have been described as representations of a historical juncture of sexuality in comedy and popular culture. Academics have also named Anita Ekberg and Bettie Page as catalysts of the trend of exaggerated female sexuality. M. Thomas Inge describes Mansfield, Monroe, and Jane Russell as personifications of the bad girl in popular culture. Judy Holliday and Goldie Hawn have also been said to have established the "dumb blonde" stereotype, typified by overt sexuality and apparent inability to understand everyday life. Instead of the asexualized and virginal "nice girls" of earlier films, the pneumatic blonde bombshells took over the screen in the 1950s and have been consistently emulated since. Social historian Joan Jacobs Brumberg called the 1950s as "an era distinguished by its worship of full-breasted women" and attributes the paradigm shift to Mansfield and Monroe. Patricia Vettel-Becker specifically attributed the phenomenon to Playboy magazine and Mansfield's and Monroe's appearances in it.

==== Figure ====
Newspapers in the 1950s routinely published Mansfield's body measurements, which once led evangelist Billy Graham to exclaim, "This country knows more about Jayne Mansfield's statistics than the Second Commandment." Mansfield proclaimed a 41-inch bust line and a 22-inch waist when she made her Broadway debut in 1955, though those measurements are in dispute. She was known as "the Cleavage Queen" and "the Queen of Sex and Bosom". Mansfield's largest bust measurement was 46-DD (117 cm), measured by the press in 1967. According to Playboy, in 1955, her measurements were 40D-21-36 (102–53–91 cm) on her 5 ft 6 in (1.68 m) frame.

Drawing on the Freudian concept of fetishism, British science-fiction writer and socio-cultural commentator J. G. Ballard said that Mae West's, Mansfield's, and Monroe's breasts "loomed across the horizon of popular consciousness". According to Dave Kehr, as the 1960s approached, the anatomy that had made her a star turned her into a joke. In that decade, the female body ideal shifted to the slim waif-like features of supermodel Twiggy, actress Audrey Hepburn, and others.

=== Publicity ===
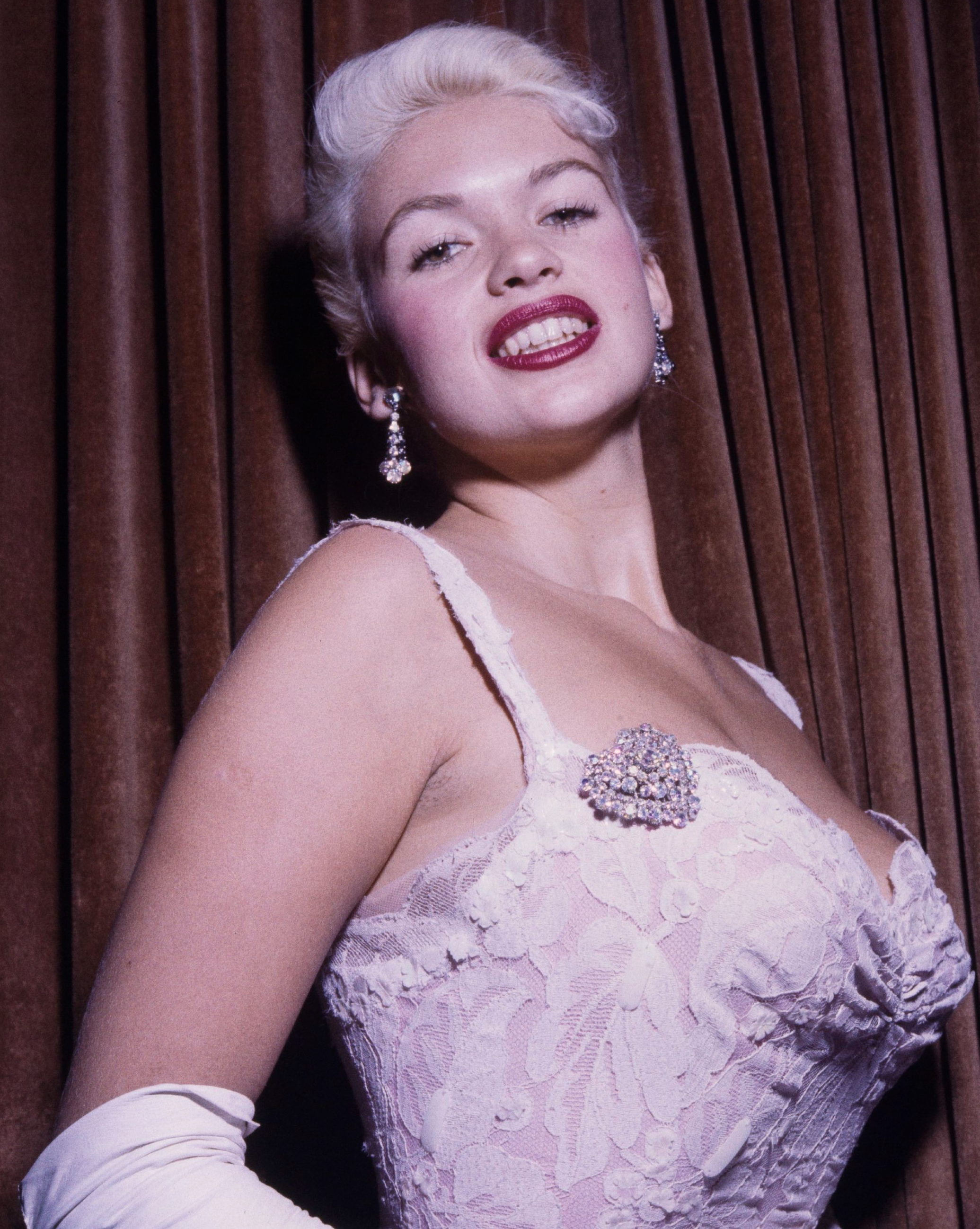
Mansfield at a premiere in Zurich in 1957

Mansfield's drive for publicity was one of the strongest in Hollywood. She gave up all privacy and her doors were always open to photographers. On Christmas Eve 1954, she walked into publicist James Byron's office with a gift and asked him to oversee her publicity, which he did, for the most part, until the end of 1961. Byron appointed most of the people on her team—William Shiffrin (press agent), Greg Bautzer (attorney), and Charles Goldring (business manager) – and constantly planted publicity material in the media. She appeared in about 2,500 newspaper photographs, and had about 122,000 lines of newspaper copy written about her between September 1956 and May 1957.

Because of this media blitz, she achieved international renown. On October 10, 1959, she visited White Hart Lane, England, and watched the Tottenham Hotspur versus Wolverhampton Wanderers FC football match. By 1960, Mansfield had topped press polls for most words in print, made more personal appearances than any political candidate, and was regarded as the world's most-photographed Hollywood celebrity. She made news on a regular basis, for malfunctioning dresses, clothing that burst strategically at the seams, and low-cut dresses without a bra. Things worsened when she took charge of her own publicity without advice. According to Shiffrin, "She became a freak." James Bacon wrote in the Los Angeles Herald-Examiner in 1973: "Here was a girl with real comedy talent, spectacular figure and looks and yet ridiculed herself out of business by outlandish publicity."

Mansfield received her first truly negative publicity after she and Hargitay pleaded poverty when his first wife, Mary Hargitay, whom he divorced on September 6, 1956, requested additional child support for their first child, Tina, in September 1958. Mansfield said she slept on the floor of her mansion, was unable to buy furniture, and spent only $71 on her daughter Jayne Marie.

==== Publicity stunts ====
In January 1955, Mansfield appeared at a Silver Springs, Florida, press junket promoting the film Underwater!, starring Jane Russell. She purposely wore a too-small red bikini lent to her by photographer friend Peter Gowland. When she dived into the pool for photographers, her top came off, creating a burst of media attention. The ensuing publicity led Warner Bros. and Playboy to approach her with offers. On June 8 of that year, her dress fell down to her waist twice in a single evening, once at a movie party and later at a nightclub. In February 1958, she was topless at a Carnival party in Rio de Janeiro. She shimmied out of her polka-dot dress in a Rome nightclub in June 1962. In the three years since making her Broadway debut in Will Success Spoil Rock Hunter?, Mansfield had become the most controversial star of the decade.

In April 1957, her breasts were the focus of a publicity stunt intended to deflect media attention from Sophia Loren during a dinner party in Loren's honor. Photographs of them were published around the world. The best-known showed Loren gazing at Mansfield's cleavage (she was seated between Loren and her dinner companion, Clifton Webb) when Mansfield leaned over the table, allowing her breasts to spill over her low neckline, exposing one of her nipples. The photo was a UPI sensation, appearing in newspapers and magazines with the word "censored" hiding Mansfield's nipple. A widespread rumor that Mansfield had a breast-flashing wardrobe malfunction at the 1957 Academy Awards was later found to be baseless by Academy researchers.

At the same time, the media were quick to condemn Mansfield's stunts. One editorial columnist wrote: "We are amused when Miss Mansfield strains to pull in her stomach to fill out her bikini better; but we get angry when career-seeking women, shady ladies, and certain starlets and actresses ... use every opportunity to display their anatomy unasked." By the late 1950s, Mansfield began to generate a great deal of negative publicity because of repeated exposure of her breasts in carefully staged public "wardrobe accidents". Richard Blackwell, her wardrobe designer (who also designed for Jane Russell, Dorothy Lamour, Peggy Lee and Nancy Reagan), dropped her from his client list because of this. In April 1967, the Los Angeles Times wrote: "She confuses publicity and notoriety with stardom and celebrity and the result is very distasteful to the public."

=== Signature color ===
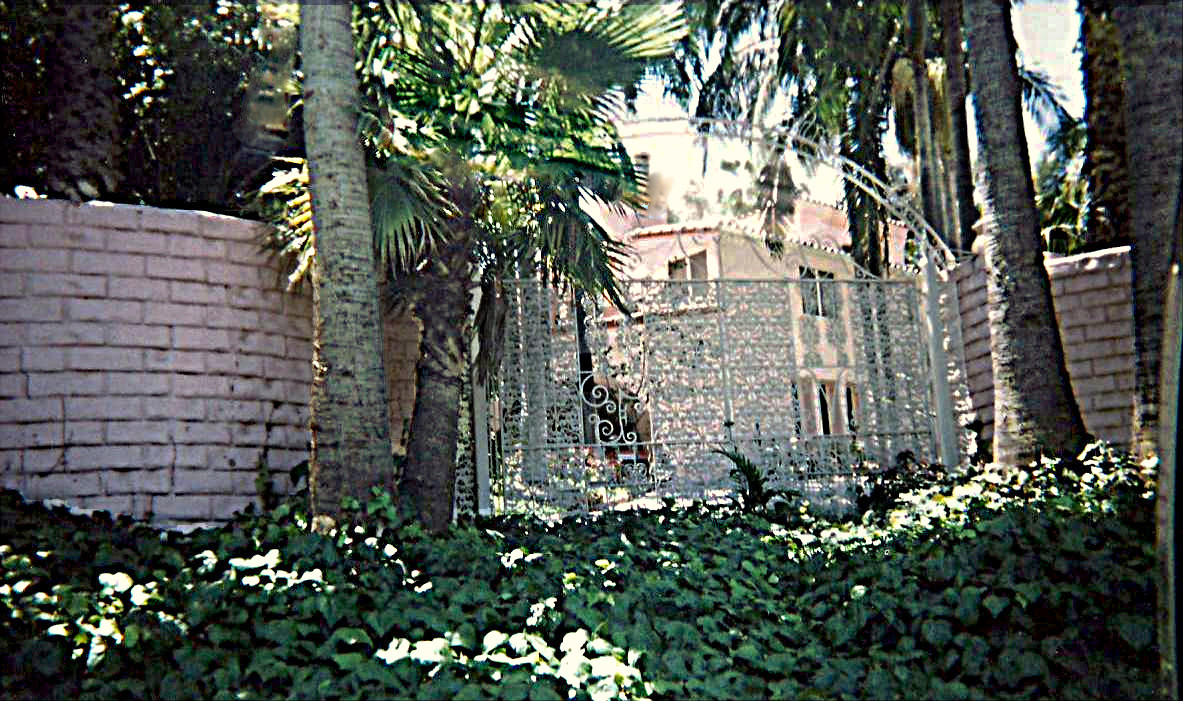
Front of the Pink Palace in 1997

Mansfield adopted pink as her color in 1954, and was associated with it for the rest of her career. Her original choice was purple, but she thought it too close to lavender, Kim Novak's signature color. "It must have been the right decision," she said, "because I got more column space from pink than Kim Novak ever did from lavender." In November 1957, shortly before their marriage, using money from an inheritance, Mansfield bought the 40-room Mediterranean-style mansion (formerly owned by Rudy Vallée) at 10100 Sunset Boulevard in the Holmby Hills section of Los Angeles. Mansfield had the house painted pink, with cupids surrounded by pink fluorescent lights, pink fur in the bathrooms, a pink heart-shaped bathtub, and a fountain spurting pink champagne; she then dubbed it the "Pink Palace". Hargitay (a plumber and carpenter before taking up bodybuilding) built the pink heart-shaped swimming pool. The year after reconstructing the "Pink Palace" as a "pink landmark", she began riding in a pink Cadillac Eldorado Biarritz convertible with tailfins, then the only pink Cadillac in Hollywood.

=== Rivalry ===
Throughout her career, Mansfield was compared by the media to the reigning sex symbol of the period, Marilyn Monroe. 20th Century Fox groomed her and Sheree North to substitute for Monroe, their resident blonde bombshell, while Universal Pictures launched Mamie Van Doren as its substitute. The studio launched Mansfield with a grand 40-day tour of England and Europe from September 25 to November 6, 1957. She adopted Monroe's vocal mannerisms instead of her original husky voice and Texas accent, performed in two plays that were based on Monroe vehicles, Bus Stop and Gentlemen Prefer Blondes, and her role in The Wayward Bus was strongly influenced by Monroe's character in Bus Stop.

Other studios also tried to find their own versions of Monroe. Columbia Pictures tried Cleo Moore, Warner Bros. Carroll Baker, Paramount Pictures Anita Ekberg, and Metro-Goldwyn-Mayer Barbara Lang, while Diana Dors was dubbed England's answer to Mansfield. Jacqueline Susann wrote, "When one studio has a Marilyn Monroe, every other studio is hiring Jayne Mansfield and Mamie Van Doren." The contenders also included Sheree North, Kim Novak, Joi Lansing, Beverly Michaels, Barbara Nichols and Greta Thyssen, and even two brunettes – Elizabeth Taylor and Jane Russell. Van Doren, Dors, and Novak also acted in productions of Gentlemen Prefer Blondes. Even when Mansfield's film roles were drying up, she was still considered Monroe's primary rival. Mansfield considered Van Doren her professional nemesis. At one point, Monroe, Mansfield, and Mamie were known as The Three M's.

== Death ==
On June 29, 1967, Mansfield was in Biloxi, Mississippi, for an engagement at the Gus Stevens Supper Club. After midnight, Mansfield; her attorney and partner Sam Brody; Ronald B. Harrison, a 19-year-old driver for the Gus Stevens Supper Club, who was driving a 1966 Electra 225 loaned by Stevens; three of her children; and her four Chihuahuas left Biloxi for New Orleans, where Mansfield was to appear on WDSU's Midday Show. At about 2:25 a.m. on June 29, on U.S. Highway 90, 1 mile (1.6 km) west of the Rigolets Bridge, their car crashed while traveling between 60 and 80 miles per hour (97 and 129 km/h) into the rear of a tractor-trailer that had slowed down from 50 to 35 miles per hour (80 to 56 km/h) due to an approaching insecticide fog-spraying truck that was flashing a red light. Mansfield, the two other adults in the front seat, and two of the dogs died instantly. The children, asleep in the rear seat, survived with minor injuries. (Note: In My Mom Jayne, Zoltán Hargitay recalled his mother and Sam Brody were fighting in the front seat, and that she had moved to the back seat next to him at one point. He also recalled that she had screamed at the time of the crash.) They were rushed to Ochsner Foundation Hospital, where Mickey Hargitay arrived that same day after learning what had happened.

Reports that Mansfield was decapitated are untrue, although she suffered severe head trauma. This urban legend started with the appearance in police photographs of the crashed car with its top virtually sheared off and what resembled a blonde-haired head tangled in the car's smashed windshield. Mansfield's death certificate gives her immediate cause of death as "crushed skull with avulsion of cranium and brain". The cause of the head-like shape has not been definitively determined. After her death, the National Highway Traffic Safety Administration recommended requiring an underride guard (a strong bar made of steel tubing) on all tractor-trailers; the trucking industry was slow to adopt this change. In America, the underride guard is sometimes known as a "Mansfield bar".

Mansfield's body was flown from New Orleans to New York and a private funeral took place on July 3 at the chapel of the Pullis Funeral Home in Pen Argyl, Pennsylvania, officiated by the pastor of the Zion Methodist Church, Rev. Charles Montgomery. Mansfield was buried in Fairview Cemetery next to her father. Mickey Hargitay was the only ex-husband of Mansfield present at the funeral.

In 1968, two wrongful-death lawsuits were filed on behalf of Mansfield and ex-husband Matt Cimber. After a 16-day trial in 1971, the jury found that Harrison, the driver of the car, was negligent, that Richard Rambo, the driver of the truck into which Mansfield crashed, was not negligent, and that James McLelland, the driver of the fog-spraying truck, was negligent but his negligence was not a proximate cause of the accident; a rehearing was denied.

The crashed car was saved by a private collector in Florida, where it became a roadside attraction in the 1970s, then was on display by the Dearly Departed Tours & Artifact Museum until the COVID-19 pandemic, when it went into storage.

Mansfield died on June 29, 1967, at the age of 34.

== Achievements and legacy ==
=== Awards and nominations ===
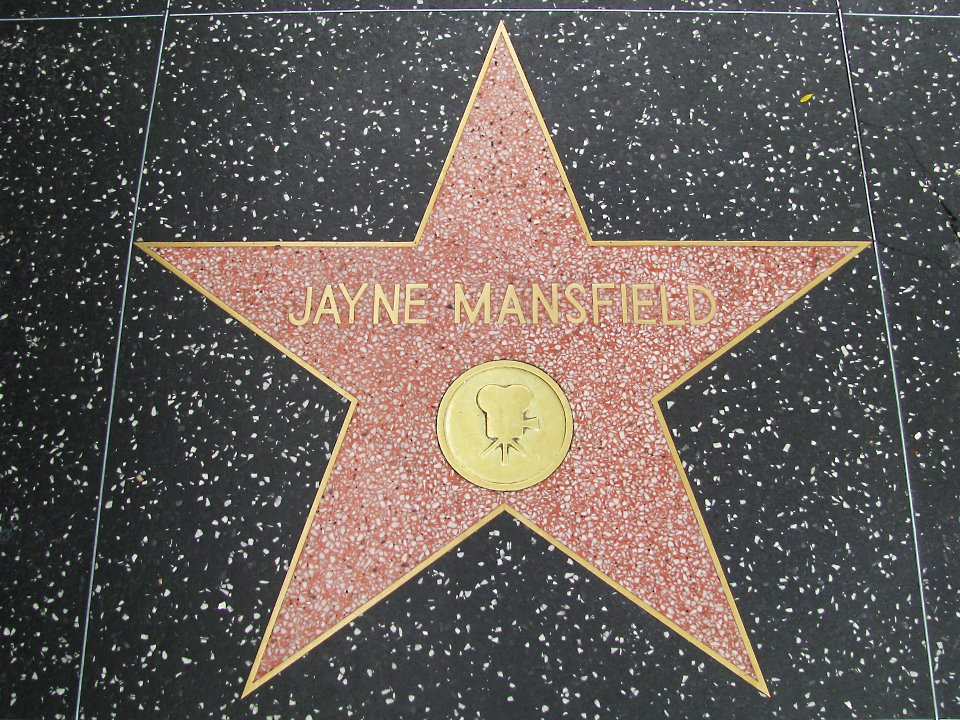
Mansfield's star on Hollywood Walk of Fame at 6328 Hollywood Boulevard. Her daughter Mariska's star was placed next to hers more than 50 years later in 2013.

- Mansfield received a Theatre World Award (Promising Personality) for Will Success Spoil Rock Hunter? in 1956.
- She received a Golden Globe Award (New Star of the year, Actress) for The Girl Can't Help It in 1957.
- She received a Star on the Hollywood Walk of Fame on February 8, 1960, for her contribution to motion pictures.
- On Mother's Day of 1960, the Mildred Strauss Child Care Chapter of Mount Sinai Hospital, New York City declared her family as the "Family of the Year".
- Italian film, radio and television journalists awarded her the Silver Mask award in 1962.
- Mansfield received the Oscar of the Two World award in Italy.
- In 1963, Mansfield was voted one of the top-10 box-office attractions by an organization of American theater owners for her performance in Promises! Promises! (a film banned in parts of the U.S.).
- In 1968, the Hollywood Publicists Guild declared a "Jayne Mansfield Award" would be given to the actress who received the most exposure and publicity in a year. Raquel Welch was the first winner of the award in 1969.

=== Legacy ===
Mansfield left behind five children and a crumbling estate, including the Pink Palace.

Mansfield is known for helping shape the "dumb blonde" stereotype. Contrary to her public persona, Mansfield was quite intelligent, and at one point could speak up to five different languages.

Her daughter Mariska became an actress and star of Law & Order: Special Victims Unit. She has won several awards for her work on the show, including a Golden Globe Award for Best Actress in 2005 and an Emmy Award for Outstanding Lead Actress in a Drama Series in 2006. Hargitay released My Mom Jayne, a documentary about Mansfield, in June 2025.

==== Estate ====
After Mansfield's death, Hargitay, Cimber, Vera Peers (Mansfield's mother), William Pigue (Jayne Marie's legal guardian), and Charles Goldring (Mansfield's business manager), as well as Bernard B. Cohen and Jerome Webber (both administrators of the estate) filed unsuccessful suits to gain control of her estate. Mansfield's estate was appraised initially at $600,000, including the Pink Palace, estimated at $100,000, a sports car sold for $7,000, her jewelry, and Sam Brody's $185,000 estate left to her in his last will. In 1971, Beverly Brody sued the Mansfield estate for $325,000 worth of presents and jewelry given to Mansfield by Sam Brody; the suit was settled out of court. However, her four eldest children (Jayne Marie, Mickey, Zoltan, and Mariska) went to court in 1977 to find that approximately $500,000 in debt that Mansfield had incurred, including $11,000 for lingerie, $11,600 for plumbing of the heart-shaped swimming pool, and litigation had left the estate insolvent.

The Pink Palace was sold. Its subsequent owners included Ringo Starr and Engelbert Humperdinck. Cass Elliot is often falsely claimed to have owned the home. In 2002, Humperdinck sold it to developers, and the house was demolished in November of that year. What remained of her estate was subsequently managed by CMG Worldwide, an intellectual property-management company.

== See also ==
- Jayne Mansfield performances
- Jayne Mansfield in popular culture
- The Jayne Mansfield Story
- Playboy
  - List of people in Playboy 1953–1959
  - List of people in Playboy 1960–1969

== Biographies ==
=== Internet ===
- "Biography". Biography.com. Archived from the original on July 22, 2012.
- "Biography". St. James Encyclopedia of Popular Culture. Archived from the original on August 10, 2011.
- "Biography". Salon.com. August 6, 2001. Archived from the original on October 15, 2012.
- Erickson, Hal. "Biography". Movies & TV Dept. The New York Times. Archived from the original on February 9, 2016.

=== Books ===
- Michael Feeney Callan (1986) Pink Goddess: The Jayne Mansfield Story. W H Allen. ISBN 978-0863791642
- Mann, May (1974). Jayne Mansfield: A Biography. Abelard-Schuman. ISBN 978-0-200-72138-7.
- Strait, Raymond (1974). Tragic Secret Life of Jayne Mansfield. Robert Hale. ISBN 0709155433.
- Saxton, Martha (1975). Jayne Mansfield and the American Fifties. New York: Houghton Mifflin. ISBN 978-0-395-20289-0.
- Strait, Raymond (1992). Here They Are Jayne Mansfield. New York: S.P.I. Books. ISBN 978-1-56171-146-8.
- Faris, Jocelyn (November 1994). Jayne Mansfield: A Bio-Bibliography. Westport, CT: Greenwood Press. ISBN 978-0-313-28544-8.
- Ferruccio, Frank (2007). Diamonds to Dust: The Life and Death of Jayne Mansfield. Outskirts Press. ISBN 978-1432712419.
- Jordan, Jessica Hope (2009). The Sex Goddess In American Film 1930–1965: Jean Harlow, Mae West, Lana Turner and Jayne Mansfield. Cambria Press. ISBN 978-1-60497-663-2.
- Ferruccio, Frank (2010). Did Success Spoil Jayne Mansfield? Her Life in Pictures & Text. Outskirts Press. ISBN 978-1432761233.

Bettie Page	Jayne Mansfield	(no Playmate)	Marilyn Waltz	Marguerite Empey	Eve Meyer
Janet Pilgrim	Pat Lawler	Anne Fleming	Jean Moorhead	Barbara Cameron	Janet Pilgrim
