= The Sheriff of Fractured Jaw =

1958 film by Raoul Walsh

- Theatrical release poster
- Directed by: Raoul Walsh
- Screenplay by: Howard Dimsdale
- Based on: The Sheriff of Fractured Jaw; 1954 Maclean's Magazine by Jacob Hay
- Produced by: Daniel M. Angel
- Starring: Kenneth More; Jayne Mansfield; Henry Hull; Bruce Cabot
- Cinematography: Otto Heller
- Edited by: John Shirley
- Music by: Robert Farnon
- Distributed by: 20th Century-Fox
- Release dates: December 1958 (United Kingdom); March 14, 1959 (New York City)
- Running time: 103 minutes
- Countries: United Kingdom; United States
- Language: English
- Box office: £400,000 (UK) $1,924,875 (U.S.) $2,485,125 (elsewhere)

The Sheriff of Fractured Jaw is a 1958 Western comedy film directed by Raoul Walsh, starring Kenneth More and Jayne Mansfield. Mansfield's singing voice is dubbed by Connie Francis. It was one of the first Westerns to be shot in Spain.

== Plot ==
In the 1880s, Jonathan Tibbs, son of a family of English gunsmiths, has no interest in the family business and prefers inventing gadgets, in particular a steam-powered horseless carriage. Threatened with disinheritance if he does not report for work, he discovers that the company is not doing very well, and concludes that someone must expand their sales.

He reads in his newspaper about the wide use of guns in the American West and decides to go there himself to sell firearms to the locals. He ends up at the small lawless town of Fractured Jaw and inadvertently acquires a reputation for quickness on the draw, due to his wrist-mounted Derringer style weapon. He is innocently drawn into a range war between the "Box T" and "Lazy S" cattle outfits, both of whom claim sole water rights and, when he proves able to stand up to their hired gunmen, is appointed sheriff.

He endeavors to clean up the town using what skills he has and by multilateral diplomacy. He attracts the support of Miss Kate, a blonde bombshell hotel owner, who helps him to fight off the hired guns of both cattle ranches, who all want him dead.

Earning the respect of the local Indian tribe, he becomes a blood brother of theirs, under the name of 'Fleet Iron Hat'. When he and Kate are besieged by the gunmen of both outfits, they come to his rescue and help to arrest the men. The two ranch owners eventually offer a deal to maintain the peace and share the water rights.

With relative peace restored, Jonathan decides to remain in Fractured Jaw, becomes an American citizen, and marries Kate.

== Cast ==
- Kenneth More as Jonathan Tibbs
- Jayne Mansfield as Kate
- Henry Hull as Major Masters
- Bruce Cabot as Jack
- Ronald Squire as Toynbee, Uncle Lucius' Solicitor
- William Campbell as Keeno
- Sid James as The Drunk
- Reed De Rouen as Clayborne
- Charles Irwin as Luke
- Donald Stewart as The Drummer
- Clancy Cooper as The Barber
- Gordon Tanner as Bud Wilkins
- Robert Morley as Uncle Lucius
- David Horne as James, Uncle Lucius' Butler
- Eynon Evans as Manager of Tibbs & Co.
- Chief Jonas Applegarth as Running Deer
- Deputy Chief Joe Buffalo as Red Wolf
- Larry Taylor as Gun Guard

== Production ==
The film was based on a short story by Jacob Hays published in the Canadian magazine Maclean's in June 1954. Prior to publication, the film rights were bought by 20th Century Fox in 1954 as a possible vehicle for Clifton Webb and Marilyn Monroe. That film was never made.

In March 1957, English producer Daniel Angel signed a deal with Fox to make at least three films in England. The first one would be Sheriff of Fractured Jaw to star Kenneth More. More had become popular in films such as Genevieve (1953) and The Admirable Crichton (1957). More, who had co-starred with American Betsy Drake in his previous movie, said, "I feel like I'm taking first steps towards Hollywood". Eight years previously, More had unsuccessfully auditioned for a role in Captain Horatio Hornblower directed by Walsh.

The female lead was Jayne Mansfield. Mansfield had been discovered playing in the Broadway comedy Will Success Spoil Rock Hunter? in 1955, and she was signed to an exclusive contract with Fox in 1956 at a $2500-a-week salary. The studio intended to mold her as a successor to the temperamental Marilyn Monroe, and cast her in Monroe-type roles in The Girl Can't Help It (1956) and a 1957 film adaptation of her Broadway triumph. She was signed on the film in early 1958, not long after marrying her second husband, muscleman Mickey Hargitay.

=== Shooting ===
The Sheriff of Fractured Jaw started filming at Pinewood Studios in England, shooting the interiors and the prologue, which is set in London. The studio's massive inventory of sets, carriages, and period props made setting the film in the mid-1800s American West easily possible.

Angel said, "Kenneth More and Jayne Mansfield were a good team."

Then, the production moved to a remote location in the Spanish province of Aragon, the first time a Western film was made in the country. According to Variety, the Spanish section of the film only cost $200,000, including a Western village and Indian camp built twenty miles from Madrid.

Walsh called on several actors he had previously worked with to fill out the cast: Henry Hull and Bruce Cabot.

During production, Mansfield became pregnant with her second child and often missed filming days, delaying production, and upsetting Fox executives. The film was completed on time and on budget, however. It was released in the United Kingdom in December 1958, but it was not released in the United States until March 14, 1959.

It was the first of a three-picture deal between More and Angel and 20th Century. More earned 5% of the profits.

== Reception ==
The Sheriff of Fractured Jaw received mixed reviews at the time of its release. It was considerably better received, both critically and financially, in England than in America. American critics gave negative reviews to Mansfield's musical performances in the film, claiming her voice was noticeably dubbed. In fact, her voice was dubbed by singer Connie Francis.

Variety said it was "not to be missed", adding, "Who ever greenlighted the starring combo of Jayne Mansfield and Kenneth More in 'The Sheriff of Fractured Jaw' has done themselves and filmgoers a good turn. These two effervescent personalities merge like bacon and eggs, and the result is a wave of yocks." Filmink said that More was "superbly cast as a British gun salesman and effectively teamed (if only via sheer contrast) with Jayne Mansfield."

=== Box office ===
The film was the tenth most-popular movie at the British box office in 1958. According to Kinematograph Weekly, the film performed "better than average" at the British box office in 1959. "It'll be a gold mine for us," said More, who had a percentage of the profits.

It made $1,924,875 in American theaters and $2,485,125 elsewhere.

More and Angel were meant to follow the film with Have Monocle Will Travel based on the adventures of an ex-British colonel but that film was not made.

== See also ==
- Spaghetti Western
