= May Mann =

American journalist

- Mann with close friend Marilyn Monroe on the set of Let's Make Love
- Born: May Vasta Randall; September 1, 1908; Ogden, Utah, United States
- Died: April 15, 1995 (aged 86); Los Angeles, California, United States
- Occupation: Journalist

May Mann, born May Vasta Randall, (September 1, 1908 - April 15, 1995) was a Hollywood columnist and freelance writer. She wrote a syndicated column about Hollywood gossip, and articles on celebrities for fan magazines. Her "Going Hollywood" column was syndicated to 400 newspapers, and contributed to movie magazines Movie Mirror, Silver Screen, Movie Teen, Screenland, and Photoplay. Her columns often featured photos of herself with the celebrity she profiled. She befriended several celebrities like Marilyn Monroe and wrote books about Elvis Presley, Clark Gable, and Jayne Mansfield. She was known as "Hollywood Date Girl" since she wrote about parties that she attended with Hollywood celebrities.

== Biography ==
May Mann was born to a prominent family in Ogden, Utah. As a child, she loved watching films and reading movie magazines. Her first newspaper publication was in 1934 in The Ogden Standard-Examiner. There she wrote as a society columnist. She met with Hollywood celebrities in Union Station in Ogden. The articles she wrote from these meetings were successful, and movie studios paid for her transportation to and from Hollywood in order for her to continue the good publicity. She started her column, "Going Hollywood," in 1936. Mann was Miss Utah in 1938. She attended many parties in Hollywood and thought of herself as a celebrity. In 1938 she wrote an article about Clark Gable for Screenland and one about Wallace Beery in Movie Mirror. In 1939, she spent several months in New York City writing columns about Broadway during the World's Fair. She spent her vacation time working as a reporter for a New York newspaper. Her columns often featured photos of her with the celebrity she wrote about, which she started when a reader doubted that she had actually met with the celebrity.

In 1956, she became one of Marilyn Monroe's favourite reporters and confidantes. As such she received a telegram from Monroe setting up a call for a specific time to confide to Mann that she and Arthur Miller would be wed 'at midsummer" but was told, 'don't print it yet.'

Mann later reported on Marilyn Monroe's wedding to Arthur Miller (after it was announced) for the New York Tribune. Mann continued to write about Monroe up until Marilyn's death in 1962. Mann reported on what she considered to be an "inept probe" into her close friend, Marilyn Monroe's untimely death. She received a call from chief Parker about the article. Mann relayed, "He said it would be bad for my health if I kept writing stories like that."

She was a regular contributor to Photoplay 1972–1977. King Features, Faucett Publications and General Features syndicated her "Going Hollywood" column to 400 newspapers. Mann wrote for movie magazines starting in 1937, and her work appears in Movie Mirror, Silver Screen, Movie Teen, and Screenland. Sometimes she used a pen name, Frances Lane, because she claimed that the Associated Press told her she could only write in one A.P. paper. She described herself as liking everyone, even if they disliked her, and "never [said] an unkind word about anyone."

Mann interviewed Mae West, Marilyn Monroe, Clark Gable, Joan Crawford, Jayne Mansfield, and Mary Pickford. Mann also wrote extensively about The Osmonds.

Later in Mann's career, she became involved in charity work, especially with the Ida B. Mayer Cummings Auxiliary, a charity that helped provide for elderly Jewish people.

== Books ==
Mann's style was that of an adoring fan. She wrote a book on Elvis Presley called Elvis and the Colonel, where she claimed to have an exclusive "authorized" interview with Elvis. Writing for The Daily Herald in Chicago, John Lampinen wrote that the book was "classic Hollywood pulp" showing only Elvis's "promotional image." After Elvis's death, author and columnist Molly Ivins updated Elvis and the Colonel, renaming it The Private Elvis.

Mann was good friends with the actress Jayne Mansfield. Mann wrote her biography after reporting that Mansfield's spirit haunted her until she wrote the book.

== Personal life ==
Mann was a member of the Church of Jesus Christ of Latter-day Saints and abstained from smoking or drinking her whole life. Mann was married to David H. Mann, a writer and editor at the Ogden newspaper, for at least two and a half years before they were divorced in 1944. David Mann sued for divorce because of desertion. Mann married Al Leon, a former concert singer who was from San Francisco in 1945. Their wedding was held in Falcon Lair and covered by Louella Parsons. Fellow columnist Cobina Wright sent invitations and managed the wedding. Mann and Leon divorced in 1948. May married Buddy Baer in 1949, and a divorce was granted in 1956.

Mann died in Los Angeles on April 15, 1995.

== Celebrity gowns ==
Evening gown and shawl owned and worn by Marilyn Monroe, given to Mann

An evening gown and shawl that had previously belonged to Marilyn Monroe had been in Mann's possession until 1992 when she gave it to Arlene and Milt Larsen to exhibit at the Magic Castle Museum. In 2017, it was sold for an undisclosed price.

== Works ==
- "A Date With Clark Gable", Screenland magazine, May 1937.
- Elvis and the Colonel, Drake Publishers, 1975. ISBN 9780847310043.
- Jayne Mansfield: A Biography, Drake Publishers, 1973. ISBN 978-0877494157.
- My Friend Clark
- Marilyn Monroe (now thought to have been lost)
- Princess, Drake Publishers, 1976. Book about Mann's cat, who made appearances at charity events to help raise money.
