= The House of Love (show) =

- Characters: Jayne Mansfield; Mickey Hargitay
- Genre: Striptease revue

Premiere
- Date: December 29, 1960 12.29.60
- Place: Tropicana Las Vegas

The House of Love is a striptease revue starring Jayne Mansfield and co-starring her husband, Mickey Hargitay.

In December 1960, the Dunes Hotel and Casino launched the revue, produced by Jack Cole. Her wardrobe for the shows featured a gold mesh dress with sequins to cover her nipples and pubic region. The controversial sheer dress was referred to as "Jayne Mansfield and a few sequins".

Mansfield received US$35,000.00 a week as her salary (US$380,906 in 2025 dollars), which was the highest in her career.

A live recording of the show was later released and distributed in 1962 by 20th Century Fox as a live album called Jayne Mansfield Busts Up Las Vegas.

== Bibliography ==
- Strait, Raymond (1992). Here They Are Jayne Mansfield. New York: S.P.I. Books. ISBN 978-1-56171-146-8.
- Faris, Jocelyn (November 1994). Jayne Mansfield: A Bio-Bibliography. Westport, CT: Greenwood Press. ISBN 978-0-313-28544-8.
