= Too Hot to Handle (1960 film) =

1960 British film by Terence Young

- Theatrical release poster
- Directed by: Terence Young
- Screenplay by: Herbert Kretzmer
- Story by: Harry Lee
- Produced by: Phil C. Samuel
- Starring: Jayne Mansfield; Leo Genn; Carl Boehm; Christopher Lee; Kai Fischer; Danik Patisson
- Cinematography: Otto Heller
- Edited by: Lito Carruthers
- Music by: Eric Spear
- Production companies: Wigmore Productions; Associated British Picture Corporation
- Distributed by: Metro-Goldwyn-Mayer
- Release dates: 16 April 1960 (West Germany); 22 September 1960 (United Kingdom)
- Running time: 90 minutes
- Country: United Kingdom
- Language: English
- Budget: £250,000 or £280,000

Too Hot to Handle (U.S. title: Playgirl After Dark) is a 1960 British crime thriller film directed by Terence Young and starring Jayne Mansfield, Leo Genn and Carl Boehm. The screenplay was by Herbert Kretzmer from a story by Harry Lee.

== Plot ==
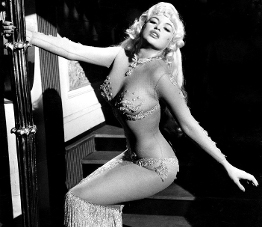
Jayne Mansfield as Midnight Franklin

Johnny Solo, the owner of the Pink Flamingo club in London's Soho area, battles with rival club owner Diamonds Dinelli and the police. When Johnny receives threats and demands for protection, he fights back.

Johnny's girlfriend Midnight Franklin, one of the club's headliners, wants him to leave the business. In the background are a sadistic client, an underage chorus girl, a wisecracking siren who is not averse to rough trade, a visiting journalist and a dancer who guards her past.

The journalist becomes involved in the strip scene while writing a story on the clubs. The competition between the two clubs intensifies. Johnny unknowingly plays a part in the death of the chorus girl. Midnight informs on him to save him from the violent blackmailers who are pursuing him.

== Cast ==
- Jayne Mansfield as Midnight Franklin
- Leo Genn as Johnny Solo
- Carl Boehm as Robert Jouvel
- Christopher Lee as Novak
- Danik Patisson as Lilliane Decker
- Patrick Holt as Inspector West
- Kai Fischer as Cynthia
- Barbara Windsor as Ponytail
- Martin Boddey as Mr. Arpels
- Sheldon Lawrence as Diamonds Dinelli
- John Salew as Moeller
- Tom Bowman as Flash Gordon
- Larry Taylor as Mouth

== Production ==
Too Hot to Handle was Jayne Mansfield's first film away from 20th Century Fox after achieving stardom in the mid-1950s. Fox loaned her to other studios while awaiting a suitable film for her.

The film was shot in England from 10 August until around October 1959.

Filming was temporarily halted on 24 September, with three weeks to go, at the order of Actors' Equity when £100,000 of the budget failed to materialize, partly because of the illness of Sydney Box, who was slated to produce. Jayne Mansfield and Leo Genn agreed to deferments. However a mystery investor provided £100,000 to enable filming to resume. This was reportedly Sol Lesser.

== Release ==
It was originally rated X by the British Board of Film Classification. The film was billed as "an exposé of 'sexy, sordid Soho, England's greatest shame.'" The original color British release has not had a home video release to date.

The French release was uncensored, using the takes with less clothing, as many scenes were shot twice, with the dancers wearing more or less clothing and a different edit of Mansfield's title song.

The German color release is a mix of both British and French takes, along with additional censor cuts, including the deletion of most of Mansfield's song "You Were Made For Me" (a parody of Marilyn Monroe).

For its American release, Mansfield's risqué see-through clothing and the film's racy musical numbers caused some controversy that delayed it until January 1961, and the sexiest frames were displayed in Playboy magazine. The US posters called it "The Sizzler You Read About in Playboy Magazine!". Too Hot to Handle was retitled Playgirl After Dark, in black and white, and was edited to meet censor requirements. Famously, this included animating clothing on Mansfield during the title song (along with frame enlargements and cuts to the audience which showed less of Mansfield generally). This was released by a smaller company, Topaz, with 8 minutes of plot cut out toward the end.

== Critical reception ==
The Monthly Film Bulletin wrote: "Purporting to lift the lid off the strip-club underworld, it does so (in so far as the film bears any but the most general relation to its subject) only to give the audience a titillating glimpse of nudity and brutality. The attempts to work a moral into the action, or environmental cause and effect into the characterisation, are patently insincere. Such convenient dual morality is nothing new. But one expects that at the very least it should be competently presented. A contrived plot, some atrocious acting, and a script that is almost a parody of the thick-ear genre prevent even that minor satisfaction. Apart from some lavishly staged cabaret numbers, only two things relieve the tedium. One is the extreme realism of sequences showing tired businessmen lecherously inspecting the strip-tease shows. The other occurs when Lilliane is confirmed as a cut above the other strippers by the discovery that in her spare time she reads Havelock Ellis, Krafft-Ebing and Sigmund Freud."

Variety wrote: "Jayne Mansfield made a 6,000 mile journey to make this British meller, but the trip hardly seems worth it. It will need all her marquee value to sell this dubious and seamy piece of entertainment which is set among the flashy backgrounds of Soho's striptease joints. Harry Lee is credited with the original idea, but the word "original" is flattering. Herbert Kretzmer's screenplay is hardly inspired and even that talented director, Terence Young, seems dispirited with the matter on hand. ...The chief letdown is the off-color thesping of Miss Mansfield as Midnight Franklin. ... The nightclub settings are flamboyant and overdone. Some of the production numbers come over reasonably well on the screen, though it is doubtful if they could be staged (even allowing for expense) in the average stripteasery. Dialog veers from dull to vulgar and there are many loose ends in an endeaver to provide authentic atmosphere."

Halliwell's Film & Video Guide described the film as a "[r]otten, hilarious British gangster film set in a totally unreal underworld and very uncomfortably cast."
