= Shakespeare, Tchaikovsky & Me =

Studio album by Jayne Mansfield
- Released: 1964
- Recorded: 1964
- Genre: Novelty album
- Length: 48:21
- Label: MGM (USA)

Jayne Mansfield chronology
Jayne Mansfield Busts Up Las Vegas (1962)	Shakespeare, Tchaikovsky & Me (1964)	I Wanna Be Loved By You (2000)

Shakespeare, Tchaikovsky & Me is a novelty album by actress, model and Playmate Jayne Mansfield in 1964. She recited Shakespeare's sonnets and poems by Christopher Marlowe, Robert Browning, William Wordsworth, Robert Herrick, and others against a background of Pyotr Ilyich Tchaikovsky's music for the album. The album cover depicted a bouffant-coiffed Mansfield with lips pursed and breasts barely covered by a fur stole, posing between busts of the Russian composer and the Bard of Avon.

The New York Times described the album as the actress reading "30-odd poems in a husky, urban, baby voice". The paper's reviewer went on to state that "Miss Mansfield is a lady with apparent charms, but reading poetry is not one of them."

== Tracks ==
1. "How Do I Love Thee" - 1:48
2. "The Indian Serenade" - 1:01
3. "Goodnight" - 0:40
4. "You Say I Love Not" - 0:52
5. "If This Be Love" - 0:49
6. "The Lady's Yes" - 1:14
7. "She Walks In Beauty" - 0:55
8. "Cleopatra" - 1:50
9. "Was This The Face" - 1:02
10. "Whiteness, Or Chastity" - 0:47
11. "Madrigal" - 0:20
12. "Jenny Kiss'd Me" - 0:40
13. "Verses Copied From The Window Of An Obscure Lodging House" - 1:09
14. "The Enchantment" - 0:37
15. "The Passionate Sheperd To His Love" - 1:01
16. "Upon The Nipples Of Julia's Breast" - 0:33
17. "Drink To Me Only With Thine Eyes" - 1:04
18. "The Lovers" - 1:45
19. "To The Virgins, To Make Much Of Time" - 0:44
20. "Inclusions" - 0:53
21. "When You Are Old" - 0:51
22. "Daffodils" - 0:58
23. "Take, O, Take Those Lips Away" - 0:19
24. "Mark How The Bashful Morn" - 0:55
25. "Oh! Dear, What Can The Matter Be?" - 0:44
26. "The Miller's Daughter" - 0:45
27. "The Fire Of Love" - 0:43
28. "The Constant Lover" - 0:42
29. "Why Should A Foolish Marriage" - Vow 0:42
30. "Believe Me, If All Those Endearing Young Charms" - 0:55
31. "Love Me Little, Love Me Long" - 1:33
