= Jayne Mansfield Busts Up Las Vegas =

Live album by Jayne Mansfield
- Released: 1962
- Recorded: January–February, 1961
- Genre: Live album
- Label: 20th Century Fox

Jayne Mansfield chronology
Too Hot to Handle (1961)	Jayne Mansfield Busts Up Las Vegas (1962)	Shakespeare, Tchaikovsky & Me (1964)

Jayne Mansfield Busts Up Las Vegas is a novelty live album featuring actress, model, singer and Playboy Playmate Jayne Mansfield published in 1962 by 20th Century Fox. It was a recording of her live show "The House of Love" at the Dunes Hotel and Casino.

Other contributors to the album include Arthur Blake (voice), Mickey Hargitay (commentary), the Bill Reddie Orchestra (orchestra), and Bill Reddie (conductor).

== Tracks ==
1. A House Is Not A Home Without Love
2. Interview: Jayne And Louella [Parsons]
3. I Think I'm Gonna Like It Here
4. Tete a Tete: Jayne And Bette [Davis]
5. Just Plain Jayne
6. Jayne And Charles [Laughton] Bit
7. Plenty Of Love And Twenty Calories
8. Jayne And Noel [Coward] Confab
9. I'm Physical, You're Cultural
10. Jayne And Talullah [Bankhead] Skirmish
11. I Had What You've Got When I Had It
12. Let's Do It
