= Jesse Goldstein =

Former American Judoka

Jesse Goldstein is a former Olympic level Judoka for the United States. Goldstein placed Bronze in the 1979 Judo National Championships at 95kg.
