= Will Success Spoil Rock Hunter? (play) =

1955 play by George Axelrod

- Written by: George Axelrod
- Characters: Rita Marlowe; George MacCauley; Michael Freeman; Irving LaSalle; Harry Kaye; Bronk Brannigan; Masseur; A Secretary (see Script Variations below)
- Subject: A Faustian comedy about Hollywood
- Genre: Comedy
- Setting: The sitting room of Rita's Marlowe's suite in the St. Regis Hotel in New York City and the office of Rita Marlowe Productions in Hollywood (see Script Variations below)

Premiere
- Date: October 13, 1955
- Place: Belasco Theatre

Will Success Spoil Rock Hunter? is an original stage comedy in three acts and four scenes by George Axelrod. After a try-out run at the Plymouth Theatre in Boston from September 26, 1955, it opened at the Belasco Theatre on Broadway on October 13, starring Jayne Mansfield, Walter Matthau and Orson Bean. Directed by the author and produced by Jule Styne, it closed on November 3, 1956, after 444 performances.

The play is a Faustian comedy about a fan magazine writer who sells his soul to the Devil (in the guise of a literary agent) to become a successful screenwriter. The character of Rita Marlowe (played by Jayne Mansfield) is a vapid blonde sex symbol, an exaggerated lampoon of Marilyn Monroe (who had starred the previous year in the film version of Axelrod's play The Seven Year Itch). The surname Marlowe is an homage to 16th century playwright Christopher Marlowe, who wrote the 1604 drama The Tragical History of Doctor Faustus, the plot that served as the inspiration for Axelrod's play.

The 1957 film Will Success Spoil Rock Hunter? utilized the title of the play and the character of Rita Marlowe (with Mansfield repeating her stage role) but little else. The story was changed to a satire on television advertising and Tony Randall starred as Rockwell P. Hunter, a character who never appears in the play.

== Production ==
George Axelrod's phenomenal success with the Broadway production of The Seven Year Itch had made him an overnight celebrity, a phenomenon he explored in his 1953 'comedy documentary' Confessions of a Nervous Man, which was broadcast as part of the CBS-TV anthology series Studio One, with Art Carney playing him. According to Axelrod's script, he was afraid to write a second play because its failure would make him an overnight has-been.

But the Billy Wilder-directed film version of The Seven Year Itch had been so heavily rewritten in order to meet the standards of the Hollywood Production Code that Axelrod was inspired to write another play about an author's refusal to bow to Hollywood's low standards. Axelrod used the character of George MacCauley to illustrate the way many writers succumb to the lure of high pay and celebrity, while others like Michael Freeman (Axelrod's alter ego) remain true to themselves. Twentieth Century-Fox, the same studio that had altered his first play, then bought the film rights to Rock Hunter and threw out his entire story and all but one of his characters.

Axelrod had originally intended to call his play Will Success Spoil Rock Hudson? but Hudson's agent, Henry Willson, threatened a lawsuit. After the play opened, Axelrod was vacationing in Jamaica and ran into Rock Hudson and his new wife, Phyllis Gates, on their honeymoon. The three became friends and, when the Hudsons returned to New York, they attended a performance of the show at which Hudson's name was substituted for the fictitious Rock Hunter.

After a year in Hollywood, Jayne Mansfield had played only bit parts in four movies when her agent arranged for her to audition for the role of Rita Marlowe, an all-too-obvious send-up of Marilyn Monroe. Her 40"-21"-35½" measurements and her one-of-a-kind comic twist on the dumb blonde stereotype quickly won her the role, and by opening night she found herself a fully fledged Broadway star, courted by many of the Hollywood studios that had previously ignored her.

In February 1956, Orson Bean broke his arm in the fight scene with William Thourlby and returned to the role with a cast on his arm. When the play moved from the Belasco Theatre to the more centrally located Shubert Theatre on July 9, Tom Poston took over Bean's role.

Carol Grace, who had twice married and divorced playwright William Saroyan, played Miss Logan ('A Secretary') in the Broadway production and understudied Jayne Mansfield. In August 1959 she would marry her Rock Hunter co-star Walter Matthau. Tina Louise, who also understudied Mansfield, played the small role of 'A Swimmer', a part that was deleted from the published script. According to columnist Dorothy Kilgallen, "Jayne Mansfield, Tina Louise and Carol Saroyan are all imitating Marilyn Monroe, probably by direction. It gets a bit repetitious in that department."

Mamie Van Doren, who had turned down the Rita role for Broadway, turned it down again when the play subsequently reached the West Coast. Rita was played instead by Merry Anders and the production opened at the Carthay Circle Theatre in Los Angeles on May 21, 1956. The play was popular on tour too; Roxanne Arlen, for example, played Rita in several US cities in 1956/57.

== Synopsis ==
Fan magazine writer George MacCauley visits Hollywood's reigning sex goddess Rita Marlowe in her swank New York hotel and confesses that this is only his second interview, the first having been titled 'Will Success Spoil Rock Hunter?' Arriving moments later is the hottest new playwright in town, Michael Freeman (author of 'No Hiding Place Down Here'), quickly followed by literary agent Irving 'Sneaky' LaSalle (inspired by real-life agent Irving 'Swifty' Lazar) and Hollywood mogul Harry Kaye, who is apoplectic about having paid $350,000 for the rights to Mike's play. LaSalle tries to convince the playwright to sign with his agency and write a second play, but Mike is reluctant to write what might be a flop. George, left alone with LaSalle, is persuaded to sign up instead. LaSalle's fee for each of his services is the usual ten per cent, but what George does not realise is that he'll be selling off pieces of his soul in ever-increasing increments. George's first wish is for a million dollars; he gets it. Then, when he fantasises about having a woman like Rita Marlowe love him, the suddenly love-struck Rita re-enters and Act One ends with George carrying her into the bedroom.

In Act Two, the scene shifts to the Hollywood office of Rita Marlowe Productions, where Mike flirts with Rita's pert secretary, Miss Logan. George has learned that Rita's not-yet-divorced husband, football star Bronk Brannigan, is none too happy about her new relationship. Worse, George has been engaged to write his first screenplay, an adaptation of Mike's psychological drama about a prostitute and a psychiatrist, and after four weeks he still has no idea how to go about it. With an all-important story conference due any minute, LaSalle increases his hold on George by giving him the requisite 'inspiration' to satisfy the increasingly impatient Harry.

In Act Three, a year has passed and George has won an Oscar. When Bronk shows up and begins to pummel George, LaSalle (exacting another ten per cent) enables George to get the better of Bronk; in fact, George tosses the astonished athlete through a window in a shower of broken glass. Soon afterwards, however, George decides he must get out of town before LaSalle takes complete control of him on reaching the full 100 per cent. His penultimate wish is to give Mike a ready-made Pulitzer Prize-winning play, but Mike suddenly realises that he could never pass off as his own a play he did not write. When LaSalle reappears, George selflessly releases Rita from his control and Mike convinces LaSalle to take him on as a client instead, even agreeing to start with the 90 per cent share already pledged. When LaSalle grabs the offer, Mike explains that it was a bad trade, because he's completely happy with his life and has no intention of selling off the remaining ten per cent. LaSalle petulantly grabs George's Oscar and departs. As the play ends, Mike and George are on their way back to New York, Mike not forgetting to grab his typewriter on the way out.

== Film version ==
Studio head Buddy Adler purchased the rights to the play to get Mansfield out of her stage contract, even though he did not believe that the play would make a good movie. Frank Tashlin had seen Mansfield's screen test for The Wayward Bus and wanted her for his film version of Garson Kanin's novel Do Re Mi (which would become the comedy The Girl Can't Help It). Tashlin's solution was to throw out all of Axelrod's play and create a new comedy about the world of television advertising, using only the character of sex goddess Rita Marlowe (Mansfield). All the other characters in the movie version of Will Success Spoil Rock Hunter? were created by Tashlin, including his new leading man, Rockwell P Hunter (Tony Randall).

To prepare for her role in the film (and for her new seven-year contract with Fox), Mansfield studied with Karl Malden at the Actors Studio. "I'm studying dancing, singing and dramatic acting," she told columnist Louella Parsons. "20th has promised to build me as one of their important stars."

== Script variations ==
In the Broadway production, Act III Scene 2 was played on the terrace of Michael Freeman's bungalow at the Beverly Hills Hotel. This scene was rewritten for the Samuel French acting edition to appear in Rita's office, thus eliminating one set and three characters seen on Broadway: a Bellman, a Swimmer and a Chauffeur.

The Broadway version of the script (minus the character of the Swimmer) was published in hardbound by Random House in March 1956 and in paperback by Bantam Books in August 1957. This version is missing the opening of Act III Scene 1 that appears in the acting edition, in which Mike and Miss Logan watch the Oscar night celebrations on TV prior to the entrance of Rita and George. The acting edition, prepared after the film version had been made, also replaces a reference to M-G-M chief Dore Schary with a name-check for Fox chief Buddy Adler, producer of the film.

== Original Broadway cast ==
- Rita Marlowe - Jayne Mansfield
- A masseur - Lew Gallo
- George MacCauley - Orson Bean
- Michael Freeman - Walter Matthau
- Irving LaSalle - Martin Gabel
- Harry Kaye - Harry Clark
- A secretary (Miss Logan) - Carol Grace
- Bronk Brannigan - William Thourlby
- A bellman - David Sheiner
- A swimmer - Tina Louise
- A chauffeur - Michael Tolan
