= Jayne Mansfield in popular culture =

Overview of Jayne Mansfield's influence in popular culture

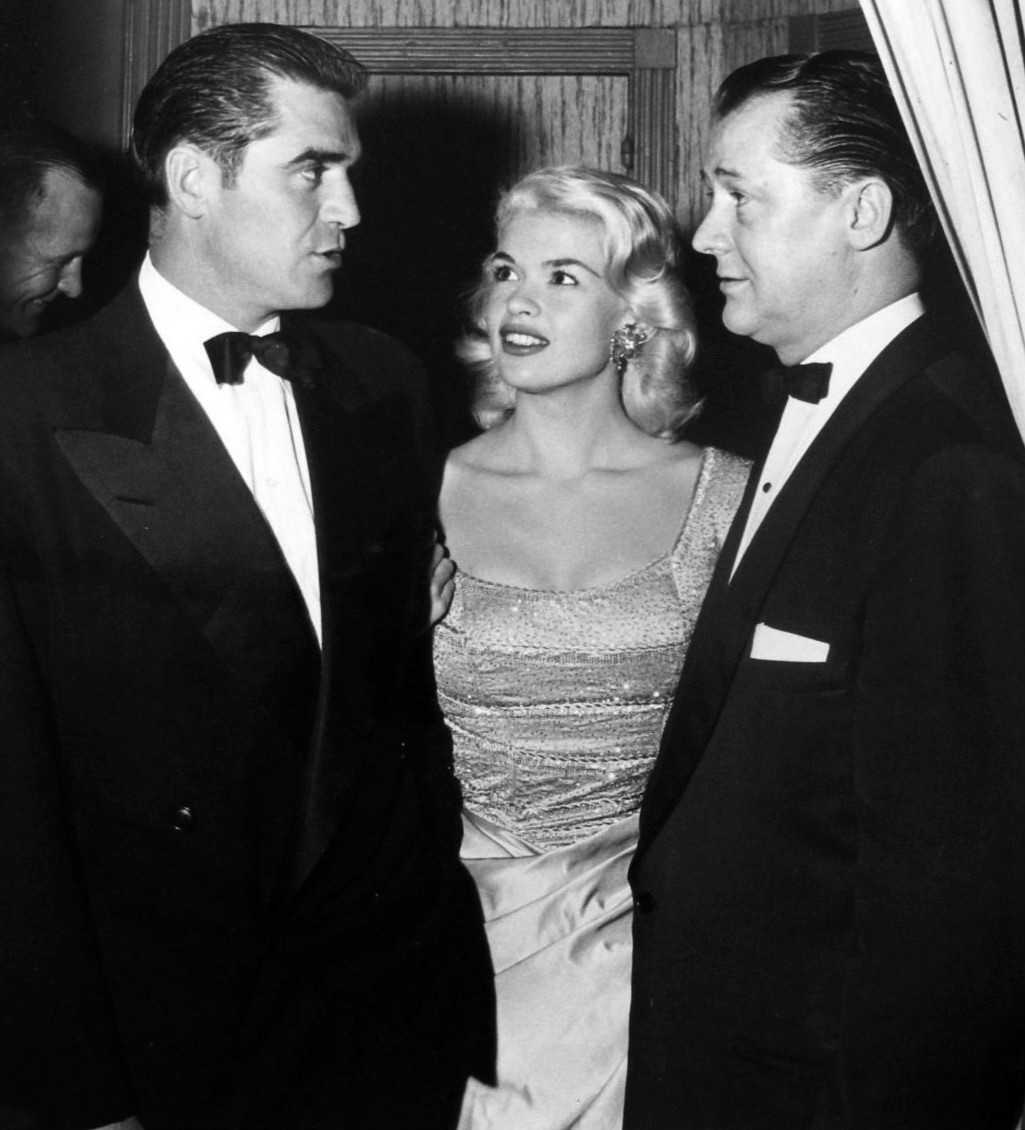
Jayne Mansfield with Steve Cochran and Ed Wynne, the owner of Harwyn Club in New York (1957)

Jayne Mansfield was an actress, singer, Playboy Playmate and stage show performer who had an enormous impact on popular culture of the late 1950s despite her limited success in Hollywood. She has remained a well-known subject in popular culture ever since. During a period between 1956 and 1957, there were about 122,000 lines of copy and 2,500 photographs that appeared in newspapers. In an article on her in the St. James Encyclopedia of Popular Culture (1999), Dennis Russel said that "Although many people have never seen her movies, Jayne Mansfield remains, long after her death, one of the most recognizable icons of 1950s celebrity culture." In the novel Child of My Heart (2004) by Alice McDermott, a National Book Award winning writer, the 1950s is referred to as "in those Marilyn Monroe/Jayne Mansfield days". R. L. Rutsky and Bill Osgerby have claimed that it was Mansfield along with Marilyn Monroe and Brigitte Bardot who made the bikini popular.

M. Thomas Inge described Mansfield, Monroe and Jane Russell as personification of the bad girl in popular culture, as opposed to Doris Day, Debbie Reynolds and Natalie Wood personifying the good girl. Mansfield, Monroe and Barbara Windsor have been described as representations of a historical juncture of sexuality in comedy and popular culture. Evangelist Billy Graham once said, "This country knows more about Jayne Mansfield's statistics than the Second Commandment." As late as the mid-1980s, she remained one of the biggest television draws. As an indication of her impact on popular culture today, there are numerous cultural references to the Hollywood sex symbol and Playboy Playmate in recent films, books, television and music. Numerous show business people were dubbed "Jayne Mansfield" over the time, including Italian actress Marisa Allasio and professional wrestler Missy Hyatt.

== Life and career ==
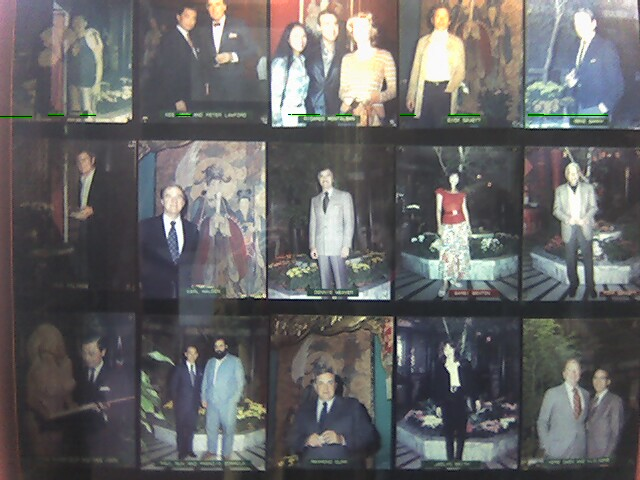
Mansfield and other stars' pictures in lobby of the Empress of China on Grant Avenue, San Francisco

Mansfield's public persona and career image became another subject in popular culture. Francesca Lia Block's Weetzie Bat books often refer to Mansfield; their characters Dirk and Weetzie watch The Girl Can't Help It (1956), and the Witch Baby's mother is part of a sinister cult that masquerades as a Jayne Mansfield fan club. In Lynda Curnyn's novel Bombshell (2004), the character Grace is advised not to become a Jayne Mansfield when it is suspected that she is pregnant without a boyfriend or a husband. Mansfield's films and events of her life also became subjects of inspiration in popular culture. In the movie The Stripper (1963), the aspiring stripper Lila Green, played by Joanne Woodward, is mistaken as Mansfield. In the novel Who Wrote the Book of Love? (2005) by Lee Siegel, Lucky Lee, an American boy in Southern California in the 1950s, becomes infatuated with Marilyn Monroe and Mansfield in his journey through sexual enlightenment. In the book, Lucky Lee uses famous quotes from films and literature - like "Wow! What a body!" and "Me Tarzan, you Jayne!" In the book, it is spelled Jayne instead of Jane, to make a pun to allude to Mansfield. Dutch writer Jan Cremer wrote a large part of his autobiographical novel I, Jan Cremer – III about their relationship.

She remains a recurring character in works of fiction. In the eleventh episode of the second season of the sitcom Goodnight Sweetheart - titled Between the Devil and the Deep Blue Sea (1993) - Diana Kent plays the role of Mansfield in a time travel story. In the same episode, John Evans plays the role of Winston Churchill. She also was a character in Underworld (1997), a novel by Don DeLillo. In Chicago Confidential (2002), a detective novel by Max Allan Collins, the series private investigator Nathan Heller falls in love with Mansfield, becomes friends with Frank Sinatra and is threatened by Joseph McCarthy.

Mansfield is also featured in numerous works of art and entertainment in general. She is mentioned in the third sketch of the 48th show of the second season of The Rocky and Bullwinkle Show (also featuring Wailing Whale episodes 5 and 6), which was first released on May 13, 1961. Mansfield also helped unveil a Rocky and Bullwinkle statue on Sunset Boulevard. On the Married... with Children season 3 episode "A Dump of My Own", Al Bundy says that when he was young he had two dreams and one of them was to become an astronaut and land on the planet Jayne Mansfield. On the Frasier episode "The Impossible Dream", Mansfield is mentioned by Marty, stating that an example of a fun dream would be in the jungle with Jayne Mansfield and her getting bit by a snake. In the film Vixen Highway (2001), Ann Tait plays the role of a Dr. Jayne Mansfield. Writer-artist Jack Kirby of Marvel Comics drew inspiration from the strong-woman image of Jayne Mansfield in designing the character Susan Storm of the Fantastic Four.

== Publicity stunts ==
Mansfield's publicity antics are another recurring theme in popular culture. On the season 32 episode of Saturday Night Live hosted by Alec Baldwin (with musical guest Christina Aguilera), one of the commercial bumpers has Alec Baldwin photoshopped into the famous picture of Sophia Loren staring at Mansfield's chest at Romanoff's in Beverly Hills. It was a direct reference to a publicity stunt of Mansfield in April 1957 intended to deflect attention from Loren during a dinner party in the Italian star's honor. Photographs of the encounter were published around the world. The most famous image showed Loren raising a contemptuous eyebrow at the American actress who, sitting between Loren and her dinner companion, Clifton Webb, had leaned over the table, allowing her breasts to spill over her low neckline and exposing one nipple. The photo of Sophia Loren sitting next to Jayne Mansfield and regarding her cleavage also inspired other photographers. In 1993, Daniela Federici created an homage with Anna Nicole Smith as Mansfield and New York City DJ Sky Nellor as Loren for a Guess Jeans campaign. Later, Mark Seliger took a picture named Heidi Klum at Romanoff's with Heidi Klum in a reproduction of the restaurant set. The meeting between Mansfield and Anton LaVey, the founder and high priest of the Church of Satan, was a much publicized and oft quoted event of her life, as well as the history of the Church.

== Death ==
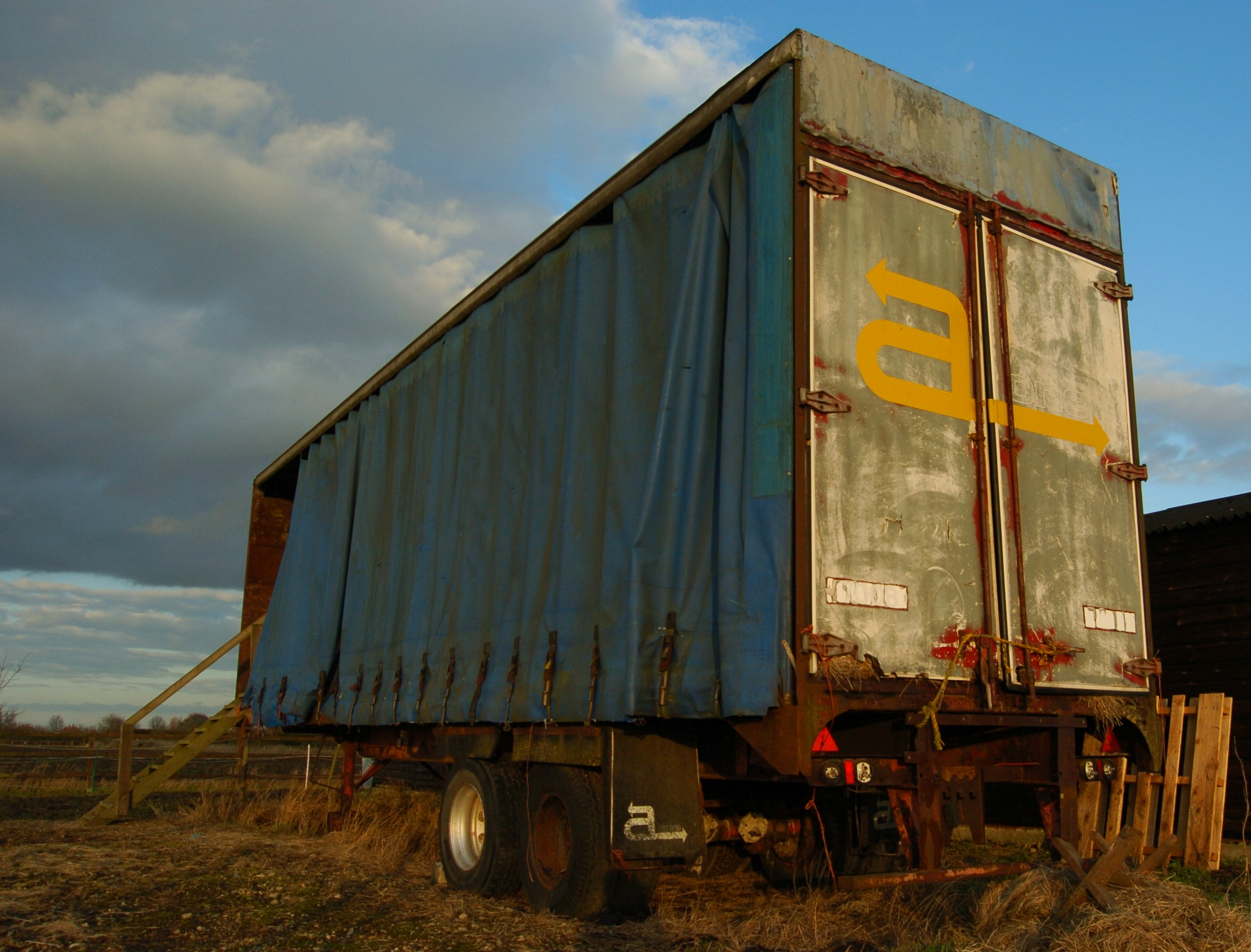
Mansfield bar behind a semi-trailer

The fatal motor vehicle accident that claimed Mansfield's life and spread the rumors of her decapitation had been the subject of many plots and scenes. In the film To Wong Foo, Thanks for Everything! Julie Newmar (1995), Miss Vida Boheme (Patrick Swayze) remarked while trying out a vintage yellow convertible, "I feel like Miss Jayne Mansfield in this car!" Noxeema Jackson (Wesley Snipes) replied "Uh oh, Jayne Mansfield, not a good auto reference." In Severance: Stories (2006), the story book containing 62 postmortem monologues, each 240-words long, by Robert Olen Butler, a Pulitzer Award winning writer, Mansfield's death is included along with James Dean, John the Baptist, Maximilien Robespierre, Marie Antoinette, Cicero and others. The underride guard, a strong bar made of steel tubing fitted underneath the rear portion of a semi-trailer, is also known as a Mansfield bar, commemorating her accident that occurred before the National Traffic and Motor Vehicle Safety Act required underride guards on semi-trailers.

In the film Leprechaun 2 (1994), directed by Rodman Flender, a character degrades the leprechaun by saying, "If hearing the actual sound of Jayne Mansfield's head being severed from her body is too intense for you, well then, you know, more power to ya." The accident is also referred to in the film One of Them (1998). In Money, Love: A Novel by Brad Barkley, the character Roman organizes a show of Celebrity Death Cars, including that of Dean and Mansfield, to win back his love interest Gladys. In the song Movie Star by the rock band Cracker sang, "Well the movie star, well she crashed her car, but everyone said she was beautiful even without her head, everyone said she was dangerous", making an allusion to the accident. In the 2003 single "Overdrive", Katy Rose sang, "I'm sitting in Jayne Mansfield's car." The Hollywood Forever Cemetery, where her cenotaph is located, is described as one of the sights to see in California by the regional tourist guide by Lonely Planet. In the episode "In Escrow" of the television series Dead Like Me, George orders a "Jayne Mansfield" for breakfast. When Kiffany the waitress gives George her order it is a pastry in the shape of breasts with blueberries as nipples. Daisy refers to the breakfast as "...blueberry muffins with their tops cut off," making reference to the urban legend of how Mansfield died.

In David Cronenberg's film Crash (1996) (based on J. G. Ballard's 1973 novel of the same name), a male stunt driver dressed as Mansfield recreates her fatal accident, killing himself in the process. His partner, a fellow celebrity-crash aficionado, comes across the scene of the wreck and says, "You did the Jayne Mansfield crash without me?" Differing from the book, the storyline of the film revolves around these two partners recreating fatal celebrity disasters, in the name of a project they call retrospectives, including those of James Dean, Grace Kelly, Albert Camus and John F. Kennedy. The film was nominated for the Golden Palm at the Cannes Film Festival; it instead won the Special Jury Prize for daring, audacity, and originality.

== Anatomy ==
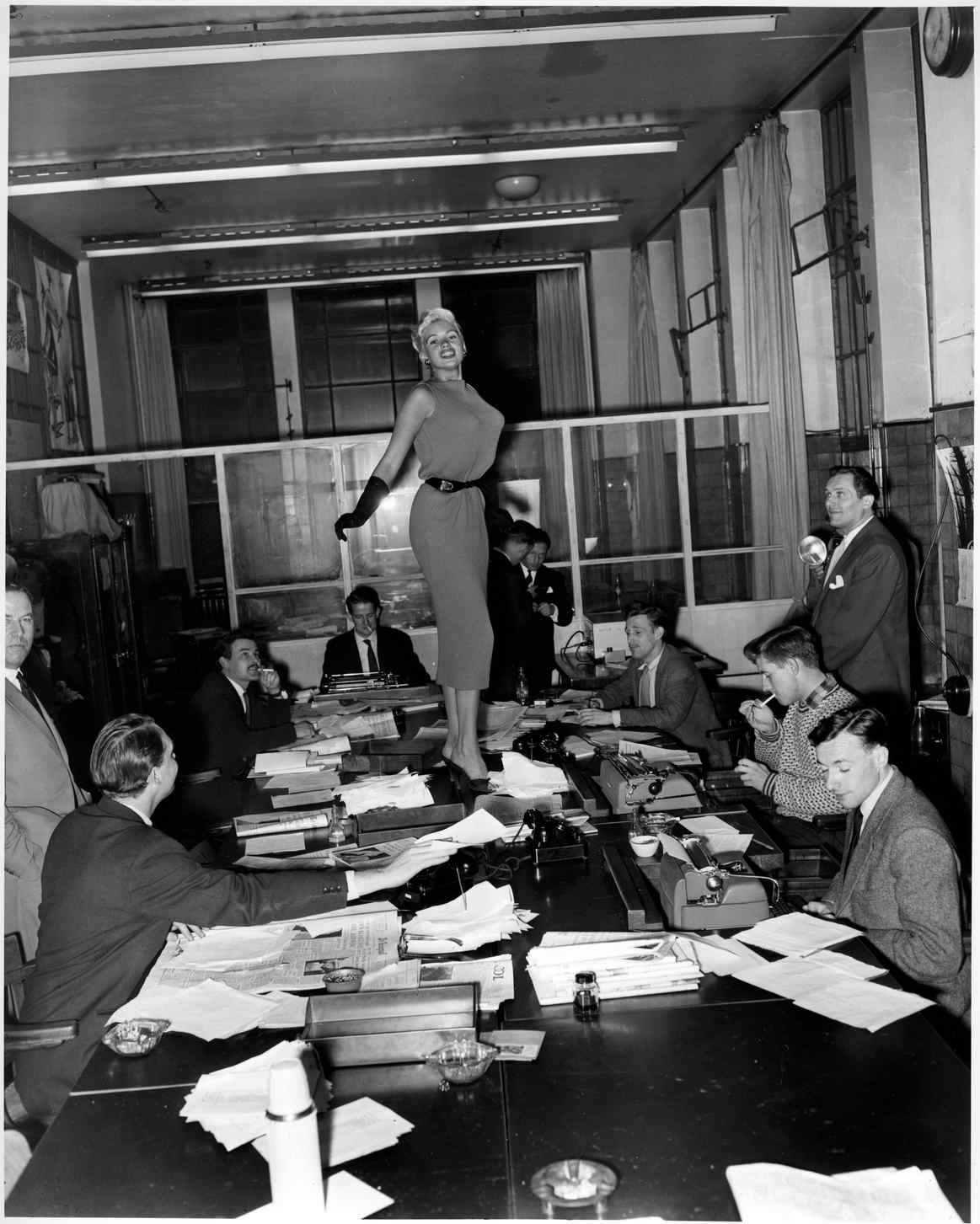
Mansfield at the Amsterdam office of Dutch newspaper De Telegraaf, 1957

Physical features of the "voluptuous" actress became subjects of humor or fascination in popular culture in a number of ways. In a 1950s Trans World Airlines (TWA) advertisement, Mansfield is shown in a low-cut bodice, facing TWA crews, with the copy reading "quite... roomy... perfect". She came to be known as "the Cleavage Queen" and "the Queen of Sex and Bosom". As early as in 1959, Harry Carlson, co-founder of Fraternity Records, marketed Jayne Mansfield water bottles shaped after her curves.

Her bosom was so much a part of her public persona that talk-show host Jack Paar once welcomed the actress to The Tonight Show by saying, "Here they are, Jayne Mansfield", a line written for Paar by Dick Cavett that became the title of her biography by Raymond Strait. Joan Jacobs Brumberg describes the 1950s as "an era distinguished by its worship of full-breasted women" and attributes the paradigm shift to Mansfield and Monroe. Almost half a century after her death, a biographer of Nikolaus Pevsner (a German-born writer on British architecture), noted the improbable coincidence that Pevsner and Mansfield had once stayed at the same hotel in Bolton, Lancashire. There, she had "electrified the dining room with her imposing bosom". Patricia Vettel-Becker makes that observation more specific by attributing the phenomenon to Playboy and the appearance of Mansfield and Monroe in the magazine. Anita Ekberg and Bettie Page are also added to the list of catalysts besides Mansfield and Monroe. Drawing on the Freudian concept of fetishism, British science fiction writer and socio-cultural commentator J. G. Ballard commented that Mae West, Mansfield and Monroe's breasts "loomed across the horizon of popular consciousness."

Only Hearts founder and head designer Helena Stuart commented, "She was the first one that was really that big. Without the bra, it wouldn't have worked. There was a whole lot there to be held in and pushed up." It has been claimed that her bosom was a major force behind the development of the 1950s brassieres, including the "Whirlpool bra", Cuties, the "Shutter bra", the "Action bra", latex pads, cleavage revealing designs and uplift outline.

In the short story by Graham Greene, May we borrow your husband?, a character comments on her breasts as, "Everybody could grow them big except me. I am no Jayne Mansfield, I can tell you." In the 2001 fiction and poetry collection of Zaffi Gousopoulos, The I. V. Lounge Reader, a character tries out lipsticks in Mansfield colors and lifting underwear to emphasize her femininity. "All women aspire to be Jayne Mansfield", says a character in Drake Worthington's book St. Vincent's Manhattan (2002), while trying out a bra. In the Seinfeld episode "The Implant" Jerry quips "you know that Jayne Mansfield had some big breasts!" to girlfriend Sidra (Teri Hatcher) as he tries to figure out if her breasts are in fact real. Mansfield Domes are the unofficial names of two prominent granite mounds located in Yosemite National Park. In Bobbie Ann Mason's novel In Country (1985), a character comments "Yeah, while I'm nursing. I feel like Jayne Mansfield" when her son comments on how big her breasts are.

Mansfield's derrière is also repeatedly referred to in popular culture. On an episode of Gilmore Girls, Lorelai goes fishing with Alex. She catches a fish, brings it home and names it Jayne Mansfield because she had a "great tail switch." In a sketch entitled "The Worst Job I Ever 'Ad" in the 1976 LP Derek and Clive Live by comedians Peter Cook and Dudley Moore, known as Derek and Clive, Clive (Cook) had the terrible job of retrieving lobsters from Mansfield's derrière. In The Broom of the System, a novel by David Foster Wallace, much of the story happens in East Corinth, a Cleveland suburb designed to look like Mansfield's curves from a bird's eye view. In Diner lingo, the term "Jayne Mansfield" is used for a tall stack of pancakes.

== Musical inspiration ==
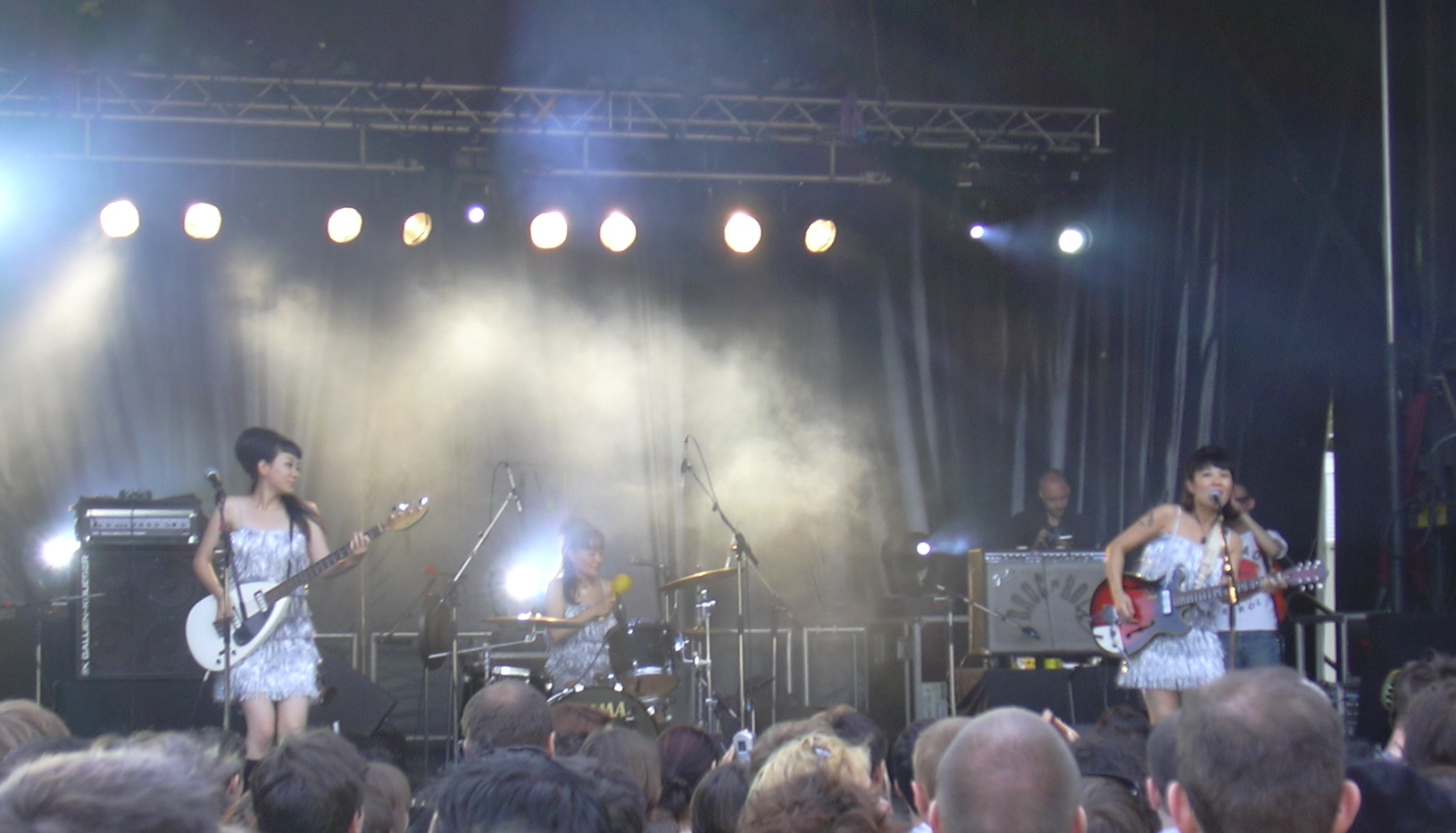
The Japanese female garage punk band The 5.6.7.8's wrote a song titled "I Walk Like Jayne Mansfield", which is featured in the movie Kill Bill Vol. 1, directed by Quentin Tarantino.

Mansfield became an inspiration for musicians in the punk rock genre. The Mansfields are a punk band who took their name from the actress and released titles "Jayne's Laugh" and "Jayne Mansfield Was a Punk". St. Jayne, a punk band from Cleveland, Ohio was also named after her. Another band of the genre called itself Jane Mansfield's Head in 1980s. In 1989, the glam metal band L.A. Guns released "The Ballad of Jayne" and the next year the cyberpunk band Sigue Sigue Sputnik released "Hey Jane Mansfield Superstar!". Masons, a punk band from Tucson, Arizona, toured in 2000 playing three songs dedicated to her—"Bombshell", "Crash My Car" and "The Witch". The British pub rock/punk band The Motors had their billboard campaign I lost my head over The Motors, which featured a picture of Jayne Mansfield, banned. German punk band The Bates has recorded a tune called "The Lips of Jayne Mansfield", featured in the album Shake (1990). The Dave Brothers, a punk rock band in the late 1990s had a Sunday show on radio station KRCL (106 FM, later taken over by KCGL) called the Church of Jayne Mansfield and distributed her posters for promotion.

The Village Voice, a newspaper, compared punk pornographer Bruce LaBruce to Mansfield. Marc Bolan, one of the most influential artists of glam rock that spawned the punk, compared the demise of Elvis Presley to Jayne Mansfield. The Japanese female garage punk band The 5.6.7.8's wrote a song titled "I Walk Like Jayne Mansfield", which is featured in the movie Kill Bill: Volume 1 (2003), directed by Quentin Tarantino. Katy Rose mentions Mansfield in her song "Overdrive", a song that was featured in the trailer for the movie Mean Girls (2004), directed by Mark Waters.

The alternative rock band Siouxsie and the Banshees picked the title of Billboard Top 100 hit single "Kiss Them for Me" (included in their album Superstition (1991)) from Mansfield's film Kiss Them for Me (1957). Lyrics of the song uses Mansfield's catchword "divoon", and refers to her heart-shaped swimming pool, her love of pink champagne and parties, and to the grisly automobile accident which claimed her life in 1967. In Grok, a novel by Tom Maremaa, a character plays the CD and asks, "Yes, kiss them for me — I may be delayed." "Too Hot to Handle", the UFO song considered to be one of the top 500 heavy metal songs, takes its title from a Jayne Mansfield film. Mansfield is also alluded in the song "The Actor" by Robbie Williams, from the album Rudebox (2006). Alternative rock band The Chills released "16 Heartthrobs" as a memorial to Mansfield. In 1997, Courtney Love of the alternative rock band Hole used a photo of Mansfield's wrecked car in the album artwork for the group's compilation album, My Body, the Hand Grenade.

== Magazines ==
The men's magazine Playboy ignited her career, and she was featured in numerous issues. It has been conjectured that Playboy was a pioneer in starting an American "breast fetish" which has exaggerated the importance of large breasts, in which both Jayne Mansfield and Marilyn Monroe, featured in the early issues of the magazine, played significant roles. Playboy pictorials of Mansfield and Monroe were part of the emerging trend that gave birth to the large-breasted feminine ideal and men's magazines including Rogue, Nugget and Dude. Numerous other magazines featured her on the cover. These include: Hollywood Studio Magazine: Then And Now (May 1987, Volume 20, No. 5.), Life magazine (April 23, 1956), Modern Man: The Adult Picture Magazine (March 1966), Photo-Rama Magazine (Volume 6, No. 16) and Playboy (June 1963).

== Poems ==
The poem "Elegy for Jayne Mansfield, July 1967", by Karen Lindsey, was included in the feminist anthology Sisterhood Is Powerful: An Anthology of Writings from the Women's Liberation Movement, edited by Robin Morgan.

== Playboy ==
Mansfield posed nude for the February 1955 issue of Playboy, which helped launch her career and increased the magazine's circulation; Playboy had begun publishing from publisher–editor Hugh Hefner's kitchen the year before. In 1964, the magazine repeated the pictorial. Photos from that pictorial was reprinted in a number of Playboy issues, including: December 1965 ("The Playboy Portfolio of Sex Stars"), January 1979 ("25 Beautiful Years"), January 1984 ("30 Memorable Years"), January 1989 ("Women of the Fifties"), January 1994 ("Remember Jayne"), November 1996 ("Playboy Gallery"), August 1999 ("Playboy's Sex Stars of the Century"; Special edition), and January 2000 ("Centerfolds of the Century"). In the Lee Siegel novel Who Wrote the Book of Love?, the character Lucky Lee turns the issue of Playboy into a bribe to meet a girl.

In 1963, Hugh Hefner unexpectedly noticed photographs that Bill Kobrin had taken of Jayne Mansfield and asked him to shoot her centerfold for Playboy. In June of that year, photos in which she appeared naked on the set of the film Promises! Promises! were used in a series of photographs that were published in a Playboy pictorial (titled The Nudest Jayne Mansfield). The pictorial was printed with a description that went, "enjoying the luxuries of a bubble bath and a double bed". It included pictures that shows Mansfield staring at her breast, as does T.C. Jones (Babbette, a female impersonator hair stylist), then grasping it in her hand and lifting it high. That issue of the magazine was banned, and publisher Hugh Hefner was arrested by the Chicago police in June 1963; it was the only time in his life that Hefner was ever arrested. The trial resulted in a hung jury that voted 7 to 5 for acquittal. Copies of the issue reportedly sold for as much as $10 each. Since that Jayne Mansfield fiasco, Playboy was scrutinized by the Customs Department issue-by-issue until 1967, and they found 51 issues out of 51 objectionable. The heavy publicity of Promises! Promises! in the July 1963 issue of Playboy and advanced blurbs on Playboy put Mansfield's name out as a major box office draw, though reviews of the film were next to disastrous.

Playboy issues featuring Mansfield include February 1955 (Playmate of the Month), February 1956, February 1957, February 1958, December 1958, February 1960 (The best of Jayne Mansfield), June 1963 (the issue that had Hugh Hefner arrested), Annual 1964 (first issue of The best of Playboy), December 1965, Newsstand Special 1989 (100 Beautiful Women), January 1994 and Newsstand Special 1999 (45th Anniversary Special), as well as the Playboy calendar in 1959. In the February 1958 issue of the magazine, the pictorial titled "The nude Jayne Mansfield" included pictures of a teen-age, brunette Jayne posing nude for an art class and her pictures with Sophia Loren.

== Biographies ==
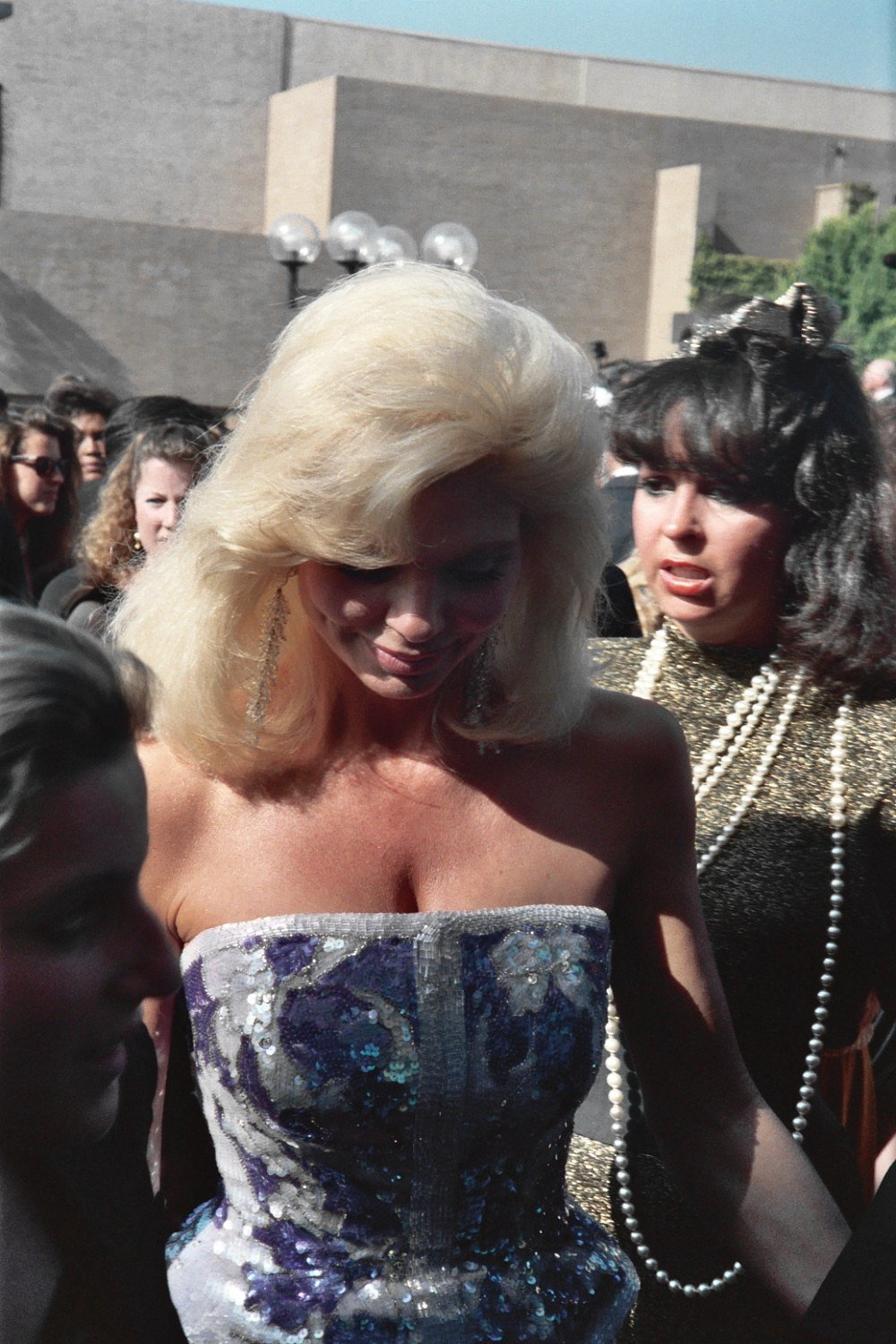
Loni Anderson plays Mansfield in The Jayne Mansfield Story, which was nominated for three Emmy Awards.

In 1980, a television film was made on her life — The Jayne Mansfield Story — which was nominated for three Emmy Awards in the categories for hair, makeup and costume. In the film directed by Dick Lowry, Mansfield is played by Loni Anderson and her husband Mickey Hargitay is played by Arnold Schwarzenegger. She was featured in the A&E Television Networks television series Biography in an episode titled "Jayne Mansfield: Blonde Ambition". The television series won an Emmy Award in outstanding non-fiction television series category in 2001. A&E again featured her life in another television serial titled Dangerous Curves in 1999. In 1988, her story and archival footage was a part of the television documentary Hollywood Sex Symbols. The first film documentary on her, The Wild, Wild World of Jayne Mansfield, started with herself working in the film, but it was finished in 1968 after her death and had to make use of archival footage. Fans of trash documentaries made a cult out of this film.

Numerous books has been written on her life and career. These include: Jayne Mansfield (May Mann; Pocket; 1974), Jayne Mansfield: A biography (May Mann; Abelard-Schuman; 1974), The tragic secret life of Jayne Mansfield (Raymond Strait; Regnery; 1974), Jayne Mansfield and the American fifties (Martha Saxton; Houghton Mifflin; 1975), Jayne Mansfield (Jean-Pierre Jackson; Edilig; 1984), Sexbomb: The Life and Death of Jayne Mansfield (Guus Luitjters, Gerard Timmer; Citadel; 1988), Here They Are Jayne Mansfield (Raymond Strait, S.P.I. Books; 1992), Jayne Mansfield vs. Mamie Van Doren: Battle of the Blondes (A Pictorial History) (Alan Betrock; Shake Books; 1993), Jayne Mansfield: A Bio-Bibliography (Jocelyn Faris; Greenwood Press; 1994), Man Enough to Be Woman (Jayne County, Rupert Smith; Serpent's Tail; 1996), Sex Lives of the Hollywood Goddesses 2 (Nigel Cawthorne; Prion; 2004), Diamonds to Dust: The Life and Death of Jayne Mansfield (Frank Ferruccio; Outskirts Press; 2007, and Did Success Spoil Jayne Mansfield?: Her Life in Pictures & Text (Frank Ferruccio; Outskirts Press; 2010), Jayne Mansfield 1967 (Simon Liberati, Grasset, 2011 - winner of the Prix Femina).

There are currently plans to make a new film of Mansfield's life, although little progress has been made. Over the years, several directors including Gus Van Sant, Brian DePalma and Catherine Hardwicke have expressed interest in making a biopic of Mansfield. Universal Pictures is apparently planning a film and reportedly has a list of actresses and models being considered to play Mansfield, including Ashley Benson, Sienna Miller, Holly Madison, Kate Upton, Kelly Rohrbach, Marisa Miller, Dakota Blue Richards, Hailey Clauson, Holly Willoughby and Charlotte McKinney.

== Documentary appearance ==
After Mansfield's death, the documentary The Wild, Wild World of Jayne Mansfield (1968) included nude scenes from the film and pages from the Playboy pictorial, along with scenes from her other films including Too Hot to Handle (1960), The Loves of Hercules (1960) and L'Amore Primitivo (1964). Promises! Promises! was presented for the first time on television in its uncut form in 1984 on the Playboy Channel. A VHS release soon followed but was only briefly in print. On February 14, 2006, VCI Video released the film on DVD with extras such as original trailers and a gallery of stills from the Playboy issue along with never before released lobby cards.

Release year	Movie title	Featured stars	Writer	Director	Producer	Notes
1956	Reflets de Cannes	—	—	—	—	Made for TV
1962	Lykke og krone	Wenche Foss, Jan Frydenlund, Shah Mohammad Reza Pahlavi, King Olav V, Brigitte Bardot, Gianna Maria Canale, Eddie Constantine, Gary Cooper, Joan Crawford, Vittorio De Sica, Anita Ekberg, Zsa Zsa Gabor, Mitzi Gaynor, Rita Hayworth, William Holden, Curd Jürgens, Gina Lollobrigida, Sophia Loren, Giulietta Masina, Victor Mature, Arthur Miller, Marilyn Monroe, Gregory Peck, Elizabeth Taylor	—	Colbjørn Helander, Stein Sælen	—	Uncredited
1964	Cinépanorama	—	—	—	—	Made for TV
1967	Spree	Constance Moore, Mickey Hargitay, Vic Damone, Sydney Field, Juliet Prowse, Barkley Shaw, Rosana Tapajós, Clara Ward	Sydney Field	Walon Green, Mitchell Leisen	Carroll Case, Hal Roach Jr.	—
1967	Mondo Hollywood	Margaretta Ramsey, Dale Davis, Theodore Charach, Ram Dass, Valerie Porter, Jay Sebring, Carazini, Rudi Gernreich, Bobby Beausoleil, Rodney Bingenheimer, Jimmy Carl Black, Gypsy Boots, Carole Cole, Coleman Francis, Carl Franzoni, Robert Maffei, Vito Paulekas, Joe Stevens, Julie Andrews, Michelle Angelo, Ann-Margret, Gene Autry, Brigitte Bardot, Sonny Bono, Richard Burton, Michael Caine, Richard Chamberlain, Cher, Diane Cilento, Arlene Dahl, Nancy Davis, Troy Donahue, Vince Edwards, Zsa Zsa Gabor, Greer Garson, George Hamilton, Rex Harrison, Audrey Hepburn, Charlton Heston, Alfred Hitchcock, Bob Hope, Rock Hudson, Hedy Lamarr, Angela Lansbury, Gary Lewis, Trini López, Dean Martin, Steve McQueen, Ann Miller, Agnes Moorehead, Paul Newman, Mary Pickford, Princess Margaret, Anthony Quinn, Ronald Reagan, Debbie Reynolds, Edward G. Robinson, Ginger Rogers, Jane Russell, Rosalind Russell, Pierre Salinger, Telly Savalas, George C. Scott, Frank Sinatra, Nancy Sinatra, Lord Snowdon, Elke Sommer, Robert Stack, Elizabeth Taylor, Danny Thomas, Andy Williams, Nancy Wilson, Jonathan Winters, Frank Zappa, Gail Zappa	Robert Carl Cohen	Robert Carl Cohen	Arthur N. Gilbert	Uncredited
1968	The Wild, Wild World of Jayne Mansfield	Robert Jason, Fernand Aubrey, Monte Duro, Lino Enner, Brigitte Halberg, Bob Oliver, Rocky Roberts, Lila Solh, Carolyn De Fonseca, Mickey Hargitay Jr., Mickey Hargitay, Zoltan Hargitay	Charles Ross	Charles W. Broun Jr., Joel Holt, Arthur Knight	Charles W. Broun Jr., David B. Puttnam, Dick Randall	—

== See also ==
- Marilyn Monroe in popular culture
- Jayne Mansfield's Car
- List of Jayne Mansfield performances
