= Freak-out (slang) =

1960s counterculture neologism

Freak-out (also known as a psychedelic freakout) is a counterculture-era phrase that originally emerged in the 1960s. The term was used as a noun, adjective and verb throughout the decade. In drug culture, "freak-out" referred to a "bad trip", though it was also associated with the Los Angeles freak scene which inspired a short-lived music scene. The term had also been defined as "a celebratory event, a gathering together of counterculturists to enjoy music and drugs," referring to happenings and parties.

The phrase, which originally gained popularity in the United States, would see further prominence in the United Kingdom with psychedelic nightclubs such as London's UFO Club (short for "Unlimited Freak Out"). Writer Tom Wolfe used the term throughout his book The Electric Kool-Aid Acid Test (1968), defining it as denoting certain "styles and obsessions". He clarified that the term was not a "negative word," and stated it could refer to "any- thing, isms, life styles, habits, leanings, causes, sexual organs".

== Etymology ==
The terms "freak-out" and "freak" have several definitions, with both terms being deployed as adjectives, nouns and verbs throughout the 1960s counterculture.

The term "freak" emerged in the 1560s. The phrase "Freak Out" is formed in a similar way to the phrase "break out". "Freak" is often used in reference to unexpected change in the weather or in nature Etymology Online says that the sense of "health freak" or other meaning of someone with a strong interest or hobby such as "Kodak freak" is from 1908. The earliest known use of the phrase "Freak Out" is in John Cleland's novel Fanny Hill published in 1748: "Whether she ever return'd to the attack, I know not, and to say the truth, I believe not; she had had her freak out".

In 1968, writer Tom Wolfe used the term "freak" a great many more than several times in his book The Electric Kool-Aid Acid Test, stating that in the context of the psychedelic movement, it was not a pejorative:

Thing was the major abstract word in Haight-Ashbury. It could mean any- thing, isms, life styles, habits, leanings, causes, sexual organs; thing and freak; freak referred to styles and obsessions, as in "Stewart Brand is an Indian freak" or "the zodiac-that's her freak," or just to heads in costume. It wasn't a negative word.

According to the California legisture's 1969 substance abuse guide, "freak-out" referred to having a "bad trip". Amidst the counterculture of the 1960s, the term "freak" was used alongside other terms such as "head" and "hippie". In the 2015 edition of Eric Partridge's A Dictionary of Slang and Unconventional English, the term "freak out" in relation to drug use is defined as "to lose sanity while under the influence of LSD or another hallucinogen". The phrase was also defined as "a celebratory event, a gathering together of counterculturists to enjoy music and drugs". The term "freak" would be defined as "a member of the 1960s counterculture. Originally a disparaging negative, turned around and used in a positive, complimentary sense. Widely used from the mid-1960s; hurled as abuse at the original hippies, the term was adopted by them and turned back on the critics by the self-confessed "freaks" with an ability to FREAK OUT themselves and others".

According to writer Skip Stone's 1999 book Hippies from A to Z, the term "freak" referred to "A descriptive term for hippies. Like the old Freak show in a carnival, hippies were so different and their behaviors so bizarre by ordinary standards they were considered freaks. But really it's an affectionate term used within the hippy community to describe someone really into being themselves, however outlandish that might be."

== Music ==
=== Freak-out music and movement ===
A handbill of "Freak Out" concert on September 17, 1966, presented by Dallas producer Pat Morgan at the Shrine Exposition Hall in Los Angeles

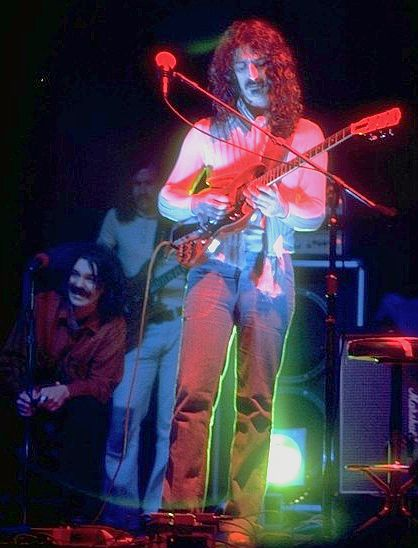
Frank Zappa and Captain Beefheart (left) photographed in a 1975 concert. They have been described as "two giants of the late-60s LA freak scene"

During the mid-to late 1960s, music publications used the term "freak-out music" to describe a subset of groups associated with the Los Angeles freak scene. In September 1966, the Los Angeles Free Press (also known as "Freep") advertised the Mothers of Invention's next performance, stating:

Pat Morgan, Dallas producer, is presenting one of the wildest light shows and dance freak-out performances at the Shrine Exposition Hall, Saturday night, September 17. The show will feature the Mothers Of Invention, Little Gary Ferguson (seven years old and a star!), along with the West Coast Pop Art Experimental Band, Count Five, Kenny Dino, and the Factory.

Another "Freak Out" performance would be scheduled for October 15 at the Earl Warren Showground in Santa Barbara, though it was cancelled according to Frank Zappa due to a "critical acoustic problem & virtually non-existent PA". According to writer Neil Slaven in Electric Don Quixote: The Definitive Story of Frank Zappa, one of two issues of Freep published a "hectoring letter" by Zappa under the pseudonym "Suzy Creamcheese." In the letter, Zappa discussed his concept of "freaking out," arguing that nonconformity alone was insufficient and that freaking out was becoming an "excuse instead of a reason". He advocated for "freaking out intellectually" and that "Looking and acting eccentric IS NOT ENOUGH".

On the October 12, 1966 issue of British music magazine Record Mirror, writer Norman Jopling describes the "freak-out" movement:

The whole movement was initially underground (even now, Freak Out records are not played on U.S. radio stations), and that the philosophy is one of the few in connection with the pop music field (or rock 'n' roll, as the Americans call pop) which was not concocted by Madison Avenue. In fact. U.S. big business is only just beginning to realise that there are dollars to be made from this cult. Last week's "Billboard" reports that many record companies are reaching out for "underground" groups-who are getting nearly all of their exposure in coffee houses. Three labels, ESP, Atlantic, and MGM are battling to sign the Fugs whose first LP on ESP has been on the Billboard' LP chart for fourteen weeks without any air play.

Kim Fowley in the October 12, 1966 issue of British music magazine Record Mirror, labeled "Prince of Freak Out"

Joplin adds, "The music itself ranges from rock 'n' roll to near-psychodelic [sic] free form [...] The connection between Freaking Out and psychodelic music is not as strong as supposed. And the equally tenuous connection between both of them and LSD is more of an enigma than a tie-up. The leaders of the Freak Out movement claim to have never taken LSD, Frank Zappa of the Mothers Of Invention, and the omnipresent Kim Fowley."

Joplin cites the Mothers Of Invention, the Blues Project, the Velvet Underground and the Paul Butterfield Blues Band as "other groups in this category," and later advertises Kim Fowley's single "Lights" as the first freak-out record in the United Kingdom as issued by EMI, concluding with "But whether the whole Sunset Strip happening scene of Freaking Out 'creative expression,' et al. is repeated in Britain, probably depends more on the passing whim and fancy of certain susceptible pop group members, rather than a revolutionary change in the social pattern of young people..."

In the United Kingdom, NME referred to The Creation as "freak-out music" in their November 1966 issue, though the writer stated the group "denied categorically that they're anything to do with the freak-out scene". In December 1966, British magazine Beat Instrumental wrote a piece on freak-out music, stating:

This 'freak-out' music takes a bit of explaining. Count Five, with their hit 'Psychotic Reaction,' have already made it onto the charts in both America and Britain. The Fingers, Kim Fowley, the Yardbirds, John's Children, and the Monkees are also part of this growing movement making an impact on the charts. But the Mothers of Invention are regarded as the most way-out of them all.

Groups like The Creation and Count Five would later be described as freakbeat, a retroactive label used to refer to the Mod-influenced proto-psychedelic British beat music of the late 1960s Swinging London.

The term "freak-out music" would be applied to a lot of Frank Zappa's work from the 1960s, with writer Kelly Fisher Lowe stating "The song eventually breaks down, as many of Zappa's songs of this era do, into a sort of acid / jam freak-out music" in reference to the song "America Drinks" from 1967's Absolutely Free.

=== Musical influence ===
In his book Evening's Empire (2010), writer Bill Flanagan reflected that in 1967 before American psychedelic rock band the Grateful Dead released their debut album, they were considered "freak-out music", stating, "I was vaguely aware of the Grateful Dead as a California band who played what we then called Freak-Out Music, long and ear-splitting jams."

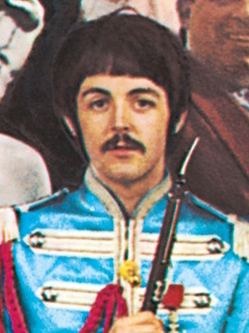
The Beatles' Paul McCartney as seen on the cover of Sgt. Pepper's Lonely Hearts Club Band, 1967

On January 18th 1967, the Beatles' Paul McCartney appeared on the Granada Television news/documentary series Scene at 6.30's episode "It's So Far Out, It's Straight Down," which featured performances by Pink Floyd as well as an interview with McCartney. In the interview, McCartney discussed the British public's reaction to the growing counterculture, referring to happenings, psychedelic freakouts and the use of recreational drugs:

I really wish the people [...] that [...] look sort of with anger at the weirdos, at the happenings, at the psychedelic freakout would instead of just looking with anger, just look with nothing, with no feeling. [...] The next time you see the word, you know, like sort of any word, any new strange word like psychedelic, you know, drugs, the whole bit, you know, freak out music and all of that, don't immediately take it as that, you know, because your first reaction's got to be one of fear, you know. [...] I really wish the people [...] that that look sort of with anger at the weirdos, at the happenings, at the psychedelic freakouts would instead of just looking with anger, just look with nothing, with no feeling.

In a 2009 interview with The Guardian, Hawkwind's Dave Brock used the term "freak-out music" to describe the band's work in 1969, when according to Brock, "we were using plenty of LSD, tape loops, repetitive riffs, colours and lights. In director Peter Jackson's 2021 documentary The Beatles: Get Back, scenes involving the band performing "freak-out jam" sessions with Yoko Ono are showcased during the 1969 recording sessions for Let It Be and Abbey Road.

The term "freak-out" has been used as a musical descriptor by several sources. On October 12, 1968, Rolling Stone magazine published an interview with the Rolling Stones' Mick Jagger, where he stated: "'Have You Seen Your Mother' was like the ultimate freakout. We came to a full stop after that. I just couldn't make it with that anymore, what more could we say."

On December 25, 1966, The New York Times published an article entitled Shock Rock: Take Musical Satire One Step Further by journalist Robert Shelton. In the article, Shelton discussed Frank Zappa and the Mothers of Invention, while briefly discussing Zappa's liner notes for his debut album Freak Out! (1966), "Zappa has apparently hit his mark, for he thinks that "freaking out" is an important method of expression and effecting change". That same month, Belfast Gypsies produced by Kim Fowley released "People! Let's Freak Out / The Shadow Chasers" under the name "The Freaks of Nature".

In 1967, American instrumental surf rock band the Ventures released the album Guitar Freakout. That same year, the Bonzo Dog Doo-Dah Band's album Gorilla parodied the term "freak" in the sleeve notes for the song "Cool Britannia", which said "Someone letta Freak-Out? What do you think Reader?"

In December 1968, Rolling Stone magazine labeled Texas psychedelic band Red Krayola as "the original freak-out group". The band were influenced by Frank Zappa and used the phrase "Free Form Freak-Out" on their debut album The Parable of Arable Land. Front man and bandleader Mayo Thompson stated in 2009: "A lot of people talked about Freakout. Then Zappa came out with his Freak Out! record. But from what I now know about Zappa I'm sure he composed every note. Ours wasn't an image of chaos, it was chaos."

In 1970, music critic Nik Cohn published the book Awopbopaloobop alopbamboom, which briefly discussed the Mothers of Invention's album Freak Out! (1966): "Bearded and gross and filthy, entirely obscene, they [The Mothers of Invention]...were freaks. They were meant to be. They were playing the same old game again, épater la bourgeoisie, but this time round it wasn't called Dada or Existentialism or Beat, it was Freak-Out. 'On a personal level', wrote Zappa, 'Freaking out is a process whereby an individual casts off outmoded and restricted standards of thinking, dress and social etiquette in order to express CREATIVELY his relationship to his environment and the social structure as a whole'". Freak Out! would later be described as an early rock concept album due to loosely being based around the Los Angeles freak scene.

In 1971, in a review of Yoko Ono's Yoko Ono/Plastic Ono Band for Rolling Stone, music critic Lester Bangs used the phrase "freak-out", stating: "It wasn't until the long freak-out on the back of the live Toronto LP that Yoko began to show some signs that she was learning to control and direct her vocal spasms, and John finally evidenced a nascent understanding of the Velvet Underground-type feedback discipline that would best underscore her histrionics."

== Freak out party ==
A "freak-out party" or simply "freak-out" is a term used in the hippie subculture or general counterculture of the 1960s to refer to psychedelic happenings or dance parties. On March 2, 1967, journalist Robert Pitman stated in The Daily Express, "These curious way-out events, simulating drug ecstasies, which are known as "freak-outs", in which girls writhe and shriek and young men roll themselves naked in paint or jelly." In the 2015 edition of Eric Partridge's A Dictionary of Slang and Unconventional English, a freak-out was defined as "a celebratory event, a gathering together of counterculturists to enjoy music and drugs".

On April 26, 1973, writer Arthur Levy published an article in Zoo World entitled Frank Zappa: The Great Southern and Western Expedition Is On! regarding a radio advertisement for a "freak out party":

We were doing a thing on a UHF station where a guy announced they were gonna have a freak out party on this record hop dance show and told all the kids to wear the weirdest clothes they could wear. And we had kids wearing two different socks and you worked your way down from there. That was a freak out party at the time.

In 1967, New York band the Unfolding released a psychedelic rock album entitled How To Blow Your Mind And Have A Freak Out Party. Additionally, the term "freak-out party" would be mentioned in a scene featured in the 1967 hippie exploitation film The Trip by director Roger Corman. The term "freak-out party" would be mentioned in Andy Warhol's book Andy Warhol's Party Book (1983).

== Politics ==
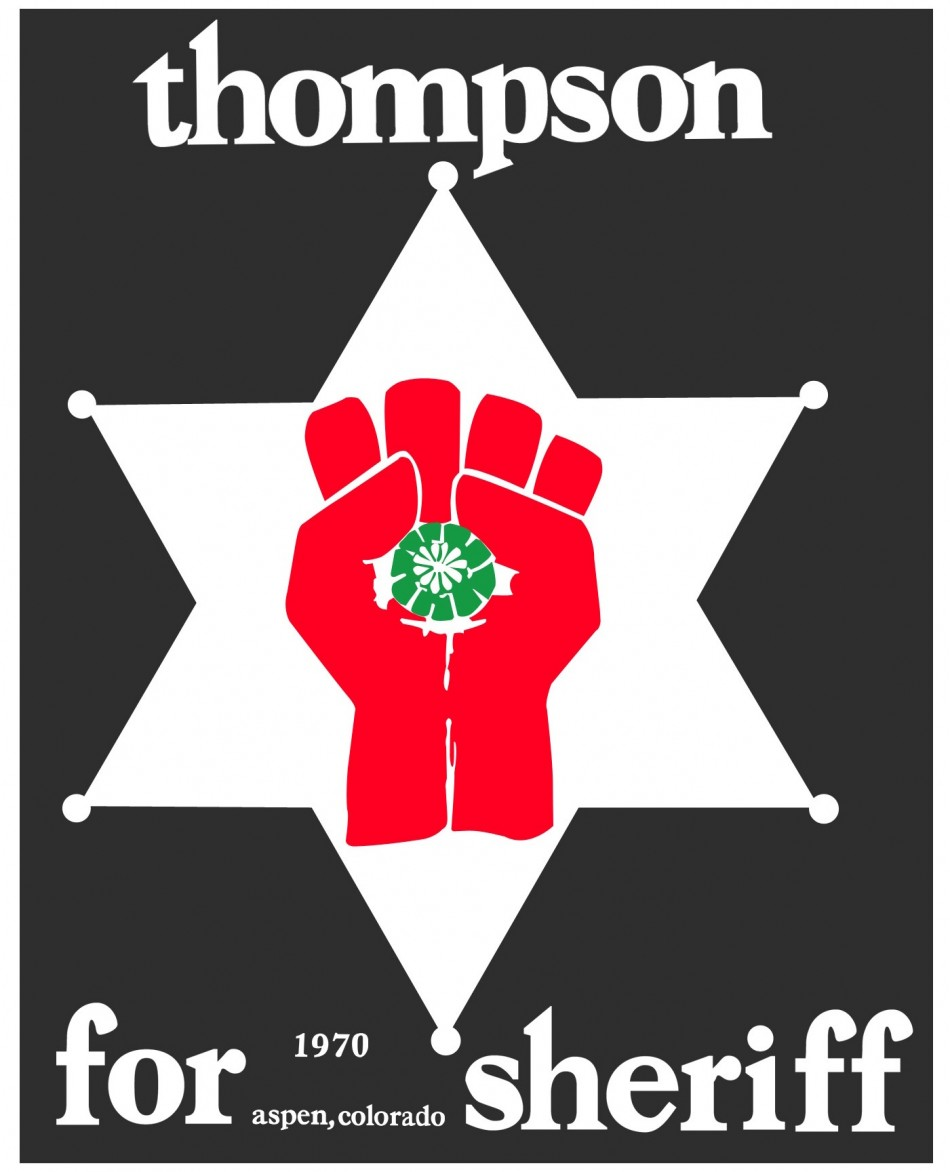
"Thompson for 1970 Aspen, Colorado Sheriff" poster by Thomas W. Benton

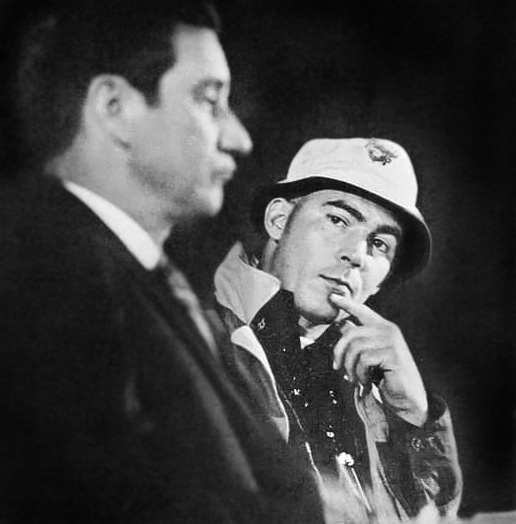
Thompson (right) at a debate with Sheriff Carrol D. Whitmire (left), his incumbent opponent

In 1970, Thompson ran for sheriff of Pitkin County, Colorado, as part of a group of citizens running for local offices on the "Freak Power" ticket. The platform included promoting the decriminalization of drugs (for personal use only, not trafficking, as he disapproved of profiteering), tearing up the streets and turning them into grassy pedestrian malls, banning any building so tall as to obscure the view of the mountains, disarming all police forces, and renaming Aspen "Fat City" to deter investors. Thompson, having shaved his head, referred to the crew cut-wearing Republican candidate as "my long-haired opponent".

With polls showing him with a slight lead in a three-way race, Thompson appeared at Rolling Stone magazine headquarters in San Francisco with a six-pack of beer in hand, and declared to editor Jann Wenner that he was about to be elected sheriff of Aspen, Colorado, and wished to write about the "Freak Power" movement. "The Battle of Aspen" was Thompson's first feature for the magazine carrying the byline "By: Dr. Hunter S. Thompson (Candidate for Sheriff)". (Thompson's "Dr" certification was obtained from a mail-order church while he was in San Francisco in the '60s.) Despite the publicity, Thompson lost the election. While carrying the city of Aspen, he garnered only 44% of the county-wide vote in what had become, after the withdrawal of the Republican candidate, a two-way race. Thompson later said that the Rolling Stone article mobilized more opposition to the Freak Power ticket than supporters. The episode was the subject of the 2020 documentary film Freak Power: The Ballot or the Bomb. Writing of the episode more than 50 years later, Wenner wrote, "Aspen didn't get a new sheriff, but I realized that, in Hunter, I had a fellow traveler."

Additionally, members of the Weather Underground drafted their manifesto and declaration of war on the U.S. state with the sentence: "Freaks are revolutionaries and revolutionaries are freaks".

== Other uses ==
In 2009, The Guardian used the term "freak-out rock" to describe neo-psychedelia band the Flaming Lips' album Embryonic.

== In popular culture ==
In 1966, Joe Boyd and John "Hoppy" Hopkins established the UFO Club in London, which was short for "Unlimited Freak Out".

In 1967, Warren Publishing released two issues of the Freak Out USA magazine which focused on California's psychedelic music scene.

In 1968, Gilbert Shelton of the underground comix scene published The Fabulous Furry Freak Brothers, which featured a group known as "The Freaks." According to The Irish Times, the Freaks were a "trio of perpetually wasted hippie desperados".

In literature: "The Electric Kool Aid Acid Test" By Tom Wolfe uses the word "freak" and other forms such as "freaking" 189 times.

In music: Joni Mitchell's song "Carey", which was written in 1970 in the fishing village of Matala on the Greek island of Crete, contains the words "And we'll laugh and toast to nothing and smash our empty glasses down Let's have a round for these freaks and these soldiers A round for these friends of mine". "Almost Cut My Hair" by Crosby, Stills and Nash and "If 6 Was 9" by Jimi Hendrix both reference the use of long hair as a symbolic "Freak Flag".

== See also ==
- Turn on, tune in, drop out
- Freakbeat
- Brown acid
- Acid Tests
- Freakout Festival
- Drug use in music
- Freak folk
- UK underground

== Bibliography ==
- Lowe, Kelly Fisher (1 October 2007). The Words and Music of Frank Zappa. Bison Books. ISBN 978-0803260054.
- Wolfe, Tom (1968). The Electric Kool-Aid Acid Test. Farrar, Straus and Giroux.
- Slaven, Neil (November 17, 2009). Electric Don Quixote: The Definitive Story Of Frank Zappa. Omnibus Press. ISBN 9780857120434.
- Flanagan, Bill (19 Oct 2010). Evening's Empire. Simon & Schuster. ISBN 1439148465.
- Victor, Terry; Dalzell, Tom, eds. (26 June 2015). The New Partridge Dictionary of Slang and Unconventional English. Taylor & Francis. p. 2536. ISBN 978-1317372523.
- Pitman, Robert (2 March 1967). ""Freak out"". Daily Express. London, England.
- Warhol, Andy; Hackett, Pat (1 July 1988). Andy Warhol's Party Book. Crown Pub. ISBN 978-0517566985.

== Other sources ==
- Sheppard, John (7 March 1967). "It's So Far Out, It's Straight Down". Scene at 6:30. ITV Granada.
