= Freak Power =

Freak Power may refer to:

- Freak Power (band)
- "Freak Power in the Rockies", the cover of a Rolling Stone magazine written by Hunter S. Thompson
- Freak Power: The Ballot or the Bomb, 2020 American film
