= Promises! Promises! =

1963 film by King Donovan

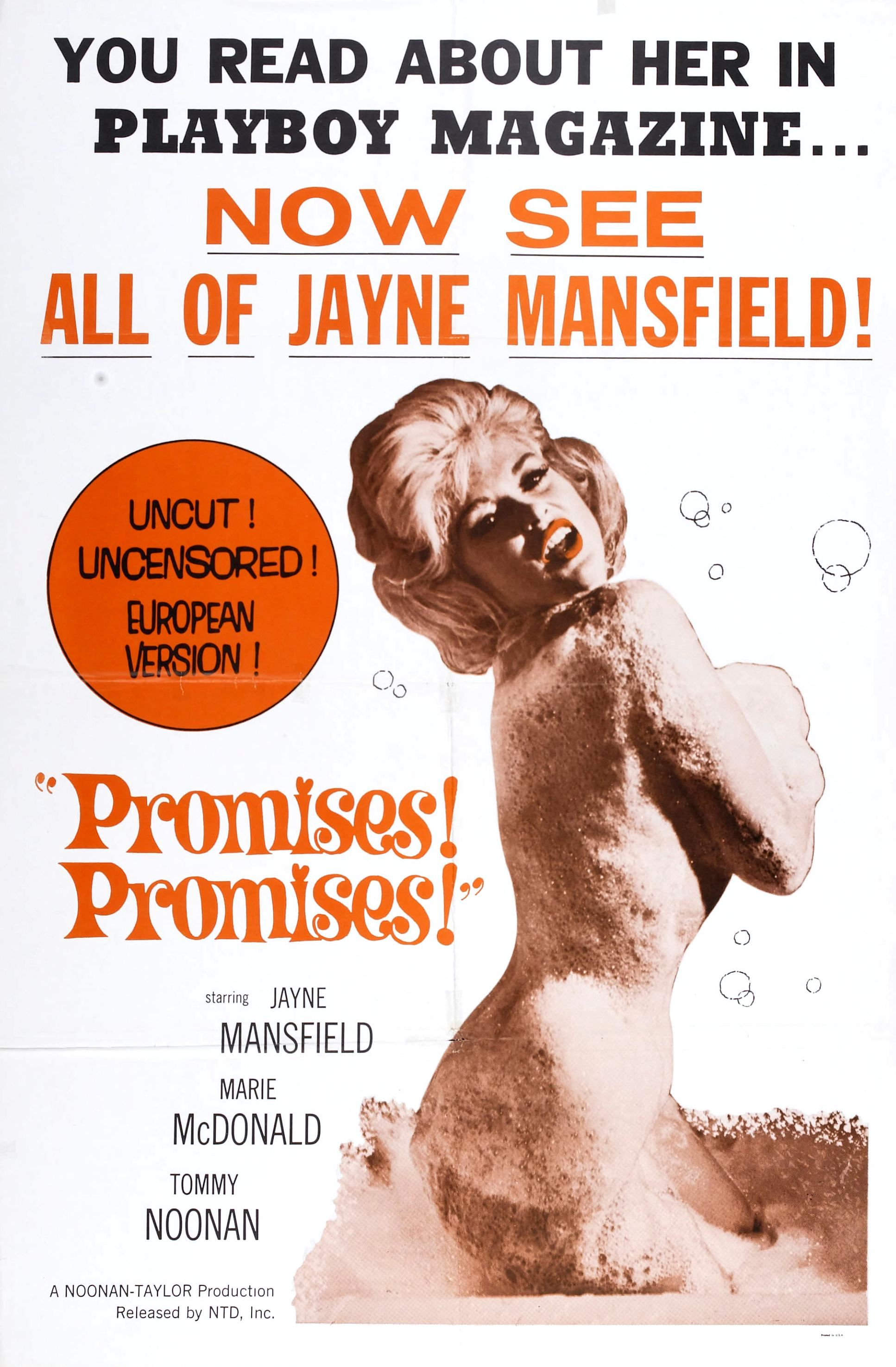
- Promotional film poster
- Directed by: King Donovan
- Written by: Tommy Noonan; William Welch
- Based on: The Plant by Edna Sheklow
- Produced by: Tommy Noonan; Donald F. Taylor
- Starring: Jayne Mansfield; Marie McDonald; Tommy Noonan; Mickey Hargitay; Fritz Feld; T. C. Jones
- Cinematography: Joseph F. Biroc
- Edited by: Edward Dutko
- Music by: Hal Borne
- Production company: Noonan-Taylor Productions
- Distributed by: NTD
- Release date: August 5, 1963
- Running time: 75 minutes
- Country: United States
- Language: English
- Budget: $400,000

Promises! Promises! is a 1963 American sex comedy film directed by King Donovan and starring Tommy Noonan and Jayne Mansfield, with Noonan also serving as co-writer and co-producer. Released at the end of the Production Code era and before the MPAA film rating system became effective in 1968, it was the first Hollywood film of the sound era to feature nudity by a mainstream star, with Mansfield appearing partially nude on screen. The film was banned in Chicago and several other major cities in the United States upon its release.

== Plot ==
Sandy Brooks is desperate to become pregnant, but her husband Jeff, a television script writer, is under too much stress to have sex. They go on a pleasure cruise together, where they meet another couple, Claire and King Banner. The couples set out on a drunken spree and change partners after returning to their rooms. Both women later discover that they are pregnant and must determine which man is the father of each baby.

== Cast ==
- Jayne Mansfield as Sandy Brooks
- Marie McDonald as Claire Banner
- Tommy Noonan as Jeff Brooks
- Mickey Hargitay as King Banner
- Fritz Feld as Doutor Ship
- T. C. Jones as Babette
- Eddie Quillan as Barman
- Marjorie Bennett as Mrs. Snavely
- Victor Lundin as Tuglio

== Production ==
Tommy Noonan had offered the role of Claire to Mamie Van Doren, but she declined and was replaced with Marie McDonald, in her final screen appearance. Ceil Chapman worked on McDonald's wardrobe for the film.

During production, producer/actor Tommy Noonan and Mansfield argued so much that Noonan recruited 20th Century Fox publicist Jet Fore to keep peace on the set.

Mansfield sings two songs in the film: "I'm in Love" (also known as the "Lullaby of Love") and "Promise Her Anything".

Mickey Hargitay, who plays King Banner, the man she swapped her husband for in the film, was actually Mansfield's real-life husband.

== Nude scenes ==
Mansfield and Noonan in the film's most repeated nude scene

Promises! Promises! became the first Hollywood feature release of the sound era to feature nudity by a mainstream star (Jayne Mansfield). That distinction would have belonged to Marilyn Monroe, who shot a nude scene for director George Cukor's Something's Got to Give in 1962, but the film went unfinished after Monroe's death. The first film featuring a mainstream star fully nude was A Daughter of the Gods (1916) featuring Annette Kellerman, but enforcement of the Motion Picture Production Code brought an end to nudity in mainstream American films until 1968. Mansfield appears undressed in three scenes in Promises! Promises!. The scenes are repeated several times in the movie as dream sequences. In the first and longest (59 seconds) scene, Mansfield sings "I'm In Love" seminude in a foam-filled bathtub and then bends over with her back to the camera. She is also seen nude in brief glimpses as she dries herself with a towel and writhes on a bed. Mansfield reportedly drank champagne to relax before appearing nude in front of the camera.

Though the film actually shows Mansfield only topless, a photo in Kenneth Anger's book Hollywood Babylon shows her on the set completely nude.

During the 1960s, some 8-mm film mail-order companies sold the nude footage. After Mansfield's death, the documentary The Wild, Wild World of Jayne Mansfield (1968) included nude scenes from the film and pages from the Playboy pictorial, along with scenes from her other films including Too Hot to Handle (1960), The Loves of Hercules (1960) and L'Amore Primitivo (1964).

== Release ==
The film was heavily publicized in the June 1963 issue of Playboy, featuring nude photos of Mansfield. The publication led to an obscenity charge against Hugh Hefner, who was arrested by the Chicago police in June 1963, but the subsequent trial ended with a hung jury, and thus acquittal. Copies of the issue reportedly sold for as much as $10 each.

Upon its theatrical release in 1963, Promises! Promises! was banned in Chicago, Cleveland, and several other cities, although a Cleveland court later ruled that the nude scenes were not obscene. Both the original and an edited version enjoyed box-office success in places where it was not banned, except for California.

The film was presented for the first time on television in its uncut form in 1984 on the Playboy Channel. The film was one of several dozen sound films to have been released in full-length form on Super 8mm in the 1970s. The film was released on VHS and Betamax videotape in the 1980s. On February 14, 2006, VCI Home Video released the film on DVD with extras such as original trailers and a gallery of stills from the Playboy issue, along with previously unreleased lobby cards.

== Reception ==
Mansfield was voted one of the top 10 box-office attractions by theater owners in 1963.

In 1967, film critic Roger Ebert of the Chicago Sun-Times wrote: "Finally, in 'Promises, Promises' she did what no Hollywood actress ever does except in desperation: she made a nudie. By 1963, that kind of box office appeal was about all she had left."

== See also ==
- List of American films of 1963
- Nudity in film
- Sex in film
