= The Wild, Wild World of Jayne Mansfield =

1968 mondo documentary film

- Theatrical release poster
- Directed by: Charles W. Broun, Jr. Joel Holt; Arthur Knight
- Screenplay by: Charles Ross
- Produced by: Dick Randall
- Starring: Jayne Mansfield
- Narrated by: Carolyn De Fonseca (uncredited)
- Cinematography: Manuela Folena
- Edited by: Manuela Folena
- Music by: Marcello Gigante
- Distributed by: Blue Ribbon Pictures
- Release date: April 18, 1968 (New Orleans)
- Running time: 99 minutes
- Countries: United States; France; West Germany
- Language: English

The Wild, Wild World of Jayne Mansfield is a 1968 mondo documentary film chronicling the travels of actress Jayne Mansfield. It was directed by Charles W. Broun Jr., Joel Holt and Arthur Knight. The screenplay was by Charles Ross.

== Synopsis ==
The Wild, Wild World of Jayne Mansfield began production in 1964 and continued shooting sporadically through 1967 as the budget was limited. The film consists of Mansfield visiting various locations throughout Europe and the United States. The European footage, shot in Rome and Paris, features Mansfield observing Italian roadside prostitutes, running from the paparazzi and attending the Cannes Film Festival. She is also filmed visiting "unusual" European locations such as a French naturist community, strip clubs, a gay bar and a massage parlor. The footage shot in the United States features Mansfield judging a transvestite beauty pageant in New York City along with footage of dancers at a Los Angeles topless bar. Musical performances by the all-girl topless band The Ladybirds(es) and Rocky Roberts & The Airedales (to which Mansfield does the Twist) are also included. Rounding out the film are clips of Mansfield's nude scenes from the 1963 sex comedy Promises! Promises!, the 1964 Italian film Primitive Love, and shots of her Playboy magazine pictorial.

Production ceased after Mansfield died in a car accident in June 1967. Upon her death, the film's producers added news footage about her death and photographs from the scene of her fatal car accident. The film concludes with a tour of Mansfield's Los Angeles home, the Pink Palace, given by her ex-husband Mickey Hargitay and a video tribute.

== Production notes ==
Working titles for the film included Jayne Mansfield Reports, Mansfield Reports Europe and Mansfield By Night. As the film was edited and released after Mansfield's death, actress Carolyn De Fonseca (who was Mansfield's official voice dubber for European productions) was hired to mimic Mansfield's voice for the narration.

Distributed by Blue Ribbons Pictures, The Wild, Wild World of Jayne Mansfield premiered on April 18, 1968, in New Orleans, Louisiana. It was released with an X rating ("for adults only") due to its adult content and nudity.

== Reception ==
Mark Kermode wrote in Sight and Sound, "Prurient 60s documentary-travelogue, touring the seamier sights of Rome, Paris and LA with Jayne Mansfield. This film was once thought lost – it's a pity someone found it again."

== Home media ==
In September 2003, Something Weird Video released The Wild, Wild World of Jayne Mansfield along with another mondo film, The Labyrinth of Sex, on Region 1 DVD.

== See also ==
- List of American films of 1968
