= It's So Far Out, It's Straight Down =

- Scene at 6.30 episode
- Directed by: John Sheppard
- Original air date: 7 March 1967

"It's So Far Out, It's Straight Down" is an episode of the 1960s Granada Television news/documentary series Scene at 6.30. It aired in the Granada region of the British Independent Television network on 7 March 1967. The episode focuses on the burgeoning London underground movement and psychedelic music scene of the time. It features interviews with Paul McCartney of the Beatles and leading underground figures connected to the International Times newspaper and Indica Bookshop, such as Barry Miles. It was directed by John Sheppard and produced by Jo Durden-Smith. The episode also includes footage of the band Pink Floyd performing at the UFO Club.

"It's So Far Out, It's Straight Down" sought to explain to a mainstream audience the cultural changes taking place in London. Music critic Tim Riley describes it as one of the events of early 1967 that "punctuate an era as psychedelic pop culture took shape". Also among these was the emergence of American guitarist Jimi Hendrix on the London club circuit, while Pink Floyd's performance in the documentary was one of the group's first television appearances. McCartney filmed his contributions in Granada's studio on 18 January 1967, the day before the Beatles recorded their song "A Day in the Life". The documentary also includes footage of Allen Ginsberg, Lawrence Ferlinghetti and Gregory Corso reciting poetry at the International Poetry Incarnation, which took place at the Royal Albert Hall in June 1965. The People Show are seen performing a piece of experimental theatre, filmed in the basement of the shop Better Books.

Author and broadcaster Richard Metzger comments on the documentary: "it's pre-Summer of Love. The time seems so pregnant with promise. This is the exact moment, historically speaking, when pop culture went from B&W and shades of gray to vivid color … it's easy to see how this film would have brought tens of thousands of young people into London seeking to find these forward-thinking cultural movers and shakers to become part of 'the happening' themselves."
