= Vito Paulekas =

American painter (1913–1992)

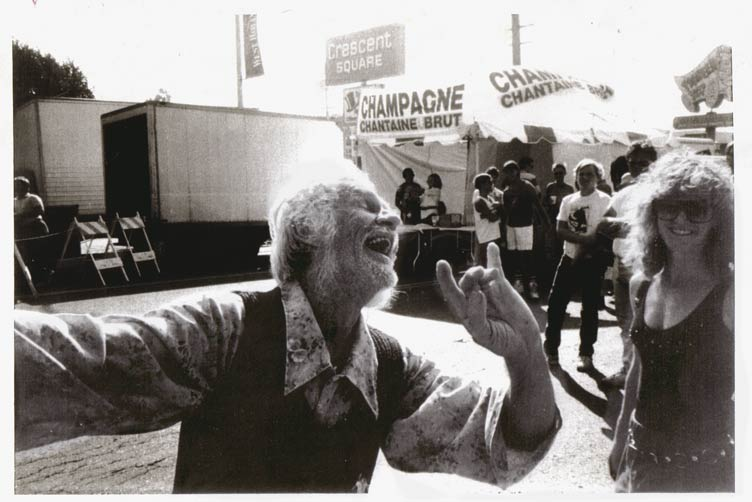
- Paulekas at a street festival in Los Angeles

Background information
- Born: May 20, 1913; Lawrence, Massachusetts, U.S.
- Died: October 25, 1992 (aged 79)
- Occupations: Musician; dancer; painter
- Years active: 1958–1992
- Formerly of: Vito and the Hands; The Mother's Auxiliary
- Spouse: Szou Palekas

Vitautus Alphonsus "Vito" Paulekas (20 May 1913 – 25 October 1992) was an American artist and bohemian, who was most notable for his leading role in the Southern California "freak scene" of the 1960s, and his influence on local musicians such as the Byrds, Love, the Leaves and Frank Zappa and the Mothers of Invention.

== Biography ==
Paulekas was born in Lawrence, Massachusetts, the son of Lithuanian immigrants. After some time spent in a reformatory as a teenager, he learned wood carving and won competitions as a marathon dancer in the 1930s. He was convicted of armed robbery in 1938, but was released in 1942 and joined the US Merchant Marine. Around 1946, he moved to Los Angeles where, by the late 1950s, he had set up home on Beverly Boulevard. There he established the "Vito Clay" studio where he "made a living of sorts by giving clay modeling lessons to Beverly Hills matrons who found the atmosphere in his studio exciting," and also ran dance classes. The Vito Clay Studio also had early patronage of movie stars, as seen in a 1960 episode of On the Go held by the UCLA Film & Television Archive, wherein host Jack Linkletter interviews Paulekas and actor Harry Dean Stanton at the studio. Vito married in 1961; his wife, Szou (b. Suzanne C. Shaffer, 1943) established a clothing boutique which was credited with being one of the first to introduce "hippie" fashions.

By about 1963, Vito, Szou, and their friend Carl Franzoni (b. 1934 in Cincinnati, Ohio), also known at the time as "Captain Fuck", had begun going to clubs with a growing group of self-styled "freaks", who reputedly "lived a semi-communal life and engaged in sex orgies and free-form dancing whenever they could". According to writer Johnny Rogan, Paulekas' "free thinking lifestyle and artistic passion inspired beatniks, aspiring existentialists and Valley girls in need of rebellion." In 1964, Paulekas offered rehearsal space to the Byrds, and the following year the troupe of free-form dancers, with Paulekas and Franzoni, accompanied the group on their nationwide tour. Later, Arthur Lee and Love also used his premises for rehearsals.

In some clubs, Paulekas and the dancers became as big an attraction as the onstage entertainment. The troupe - including several of the young women later to become known as The GTOs, and members of the Fraternity of Man - occupied the Log Cabin in Laurel Canyon formerly occupied by Tom Mix and later by Frank Zappa. Credited as "Vito and the Hands", Paulekas recorded a single, "Where It's At," which featured some of the Mothers of Invention, with producer Kim Fowley in 1966. He has been credited with first using the terms "freak" and "freak-out" to describe the scene, and with Franzoni and other members of the troupe contributed to the first album by Zappa and the Mothers, Freak Out!. He appeared in several documentaries of the period, including Mondo Hollywood (1967) and You Are What You Eat (1968).

After Richard Nixon was elected as US President in 1968, he moved to Haiti and later Jamaica, before returning to settle in Cotati, California. There, he and Franzoni established the Freestore street theatre and performance group, and built a bandstand for the town as well as contributing sculptures. In this capacity, Paulekas contributed substantially to the counterculture in Cotati, and his establishment of the Freestore led to the proliferation of the notably eccentric "Cotati look."

He and Szou divorced in 1975. They had five children, Gruvi Nipples, BB, Sky, Phreekus (Mark) and Godot who died as a child. Vito also had another child, Sophia Creme with Yara Mery in 1979. Paulekas died in Cotati in 1992, aged 79.
