= Thomas W. Benton =

American artist

Tom Benton
- Born: Thomas Whelan Benton; November 16, 1930; Oakland, California
- Died: April 27, 2007 (aged 76); Aspen, Colorado

Thomas Whelan Benton (November 16, 1930 – April 27, 2007) was an American artist, best known for his political posters and his collaborations with writer Hunter S. Thompson.

== Early years ==
Thomas Whelan Benton was born in Oakland, California on November 16, 1930. He graduated from Glendale High School and attended Glendale Junior College briefly before entering the Navy. In the Navy he served aboard a ship providing support for the Korean War. After being discharged in 1953, Benton used the G.I. Bill to pay for his tuition for a degree in architecture at the University of Southern California. After graduating, Benton spent a brief time as a practicing architect. Benton married his wife Betty during that time and they had two children, Brian and Michelle.

Benton first visited Aspen, Colorado in 1958 while he was still in college and immediately fell in love with the town. He returned in 1960 to find he was still impressed by the "neat people" Aspen had living there. After a trip to Europe and fleeting thoughts about Big Sur, his family decided to move to Colorado. In the fall of 1961 the Bentons came back to Aspen, stayed just one day, bought a lot and then returned to Southern California to liquidate their assets in order to pay for the Aspen property.

In 1963, Benton was in Aspen to begin building what would become his home, studio, and gallery and the family followed the next year. It is still located at 519 East Hyman Avenue in downtown Aspen. Benton did nearly all the work on the building himself and with friends.

== Art and Politics ==
Benton mostly gave up architecture in 1964 to devote time to his art, though he did design a select few buildings later. He became very involved in local and national politics, creating his first anti-war "peace" poster in 1965 and becoming a charter member of the Aspen Liberation Front, a loose-knit group of peace activists. He used quotes to make sure no one missed the message in his work and occasionally added a straight line to his pieces as representing the "hand of man". His artistic influences include the great Japanese artist Hokusai, Paul Jenkins, Mark Rothko, and Morris Lewis. Still, as fellow artist and friend Michael Cleverly puts it, "When he did a 'Benton', it looked like a 'Benton'."

Benton's close friends included many of the politicians in the Roaring Fork Valley and in 1970 he gained national recognition as the artist who created the posters for Hunter S Thompson's infamous campaign for Pitkin County Sheriff, including the 1970 “Hunter S. Thompson for Sheriff” poster depicting a sheriff's star covered by a two-thumbed fist holding a button of peyote. In the years after that defeat, Benton also designed posters George McGovern and Gary Hart early 1970s.

The "struggling artist" lifestyle took its toll and Benton was divorced from Betty in 1977. He remarried twice more. First to Katie Smith and then to Marci Griffin in 1991. He had to sell the studio home on Hyman and eventually worked out a makeshift studio on the Woody Creek ranch of friend George Stranahan.

== Later years ==
Benton continued to keep his hand in politics and issues that mattered to him throughout his career, designing the poster that current Sheriff Bob Braudis used in his last campaign in 2006. Starting in 1989 and continuing off and on until 2003 he worked as a jailer for the Pitkin County Sheriff Department. He was still on the roster at the time of his death. Tom spent much of his "art" time creating monoprints and paintings that were an extension of his earlier work with perhaps a bit more left to the imagination of the viewer. A self-described pessimist in his early career, his more recent works show a shift towards lighter issues in his colors and perhaps even a bit more optimism.

Benton was diagnosed with advanced lymphoma in early 2007 and died on Friday, April 27, 2007. He was 76.

A book about Benton's work, by Aspen writer Daniel J. Watkins, was published in 2011.
