= John Evans (actor) =

Irish actor

John Evans (1693?–1734?), was an actor, who confined his performances to Ireland.

He seems to have had a share in the management of Smock Alley Theatre with Thomas Elrington and Griffith. The only characters associated with his name are Alcibiades in ‘Timon of Athens,’ Shadwell's alteration from Shakespeare; and Lieutenant Story in ‘The Committee, or the Faithful Irishman,’ of Sir Robert Howard. These were played about 1715. Evans had a good voice and just delivery, and was an actor in request. He was, however, corpulent and indolent. Playing at Cork ‘in the last year of the reign of Queen Anne,’ he was invited by some officers then on duty to a tavern, where he proposed the health of the queen. This involved him in a quarrel with an officer of Jacobite views. In a duel which followed Evans disarmed his adversary. Upon his return to Dublin Evans found that the quarrel had been misrepresented, and that he was held to have insulted the army. Permission to continue the play ‘The Rival Queens’ was refused until Evans had apologised. This he was very reluctantly compelled to do. One of the malcontents bidding him kneel, Evans retorted, ‘No, you rascal, I'll kneel to none but God and my queen.’

The affair was afterwards arranged. Hitchcock simply speaks of him as ‘a Mr. Evans.’ According to Chetwood, three years later than the above incident, Evans went to the theatre in Lincoln's Inn Fields, and on the journey back to Ireland was taken ill of a fever at Whitchurch, Shropshire, whence he was carried for better advice to Chester and there died, in the forty-first year of his life, and was privately buried in the cathedral without monument or inscription. These dates, no unusual thing with Chetwood, are irreconcilable with what is elsewhere said concerning Evans.
