= Jayne Mansfield's Pink Palace =

House in Los Angeles, California

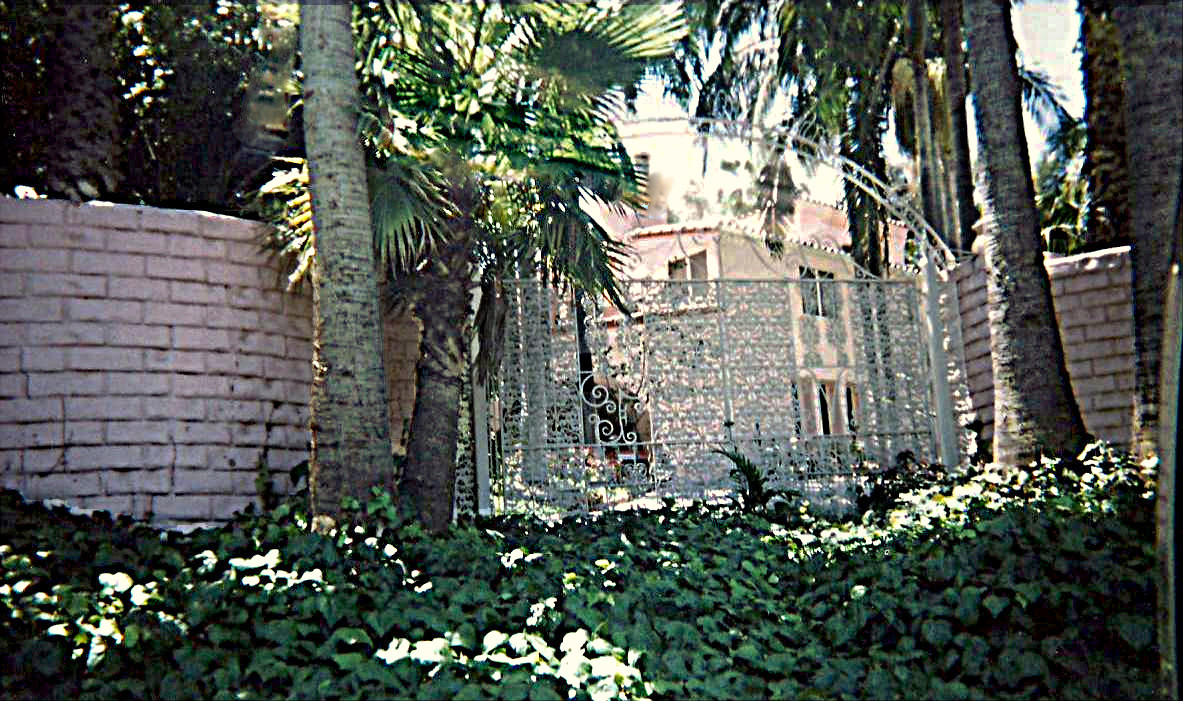
- Gate and partial view of Mansfield's former mansion, the Pink Palace (photographed 1997)
- Interactive map of the Jayne Mansfield's Pink Palace area

General information
- Location: 10100 Sunset Boulevard, Holmby Hills, Los Angeles
- Coordinates: 34°4′49.26″N 118°25′34.71″W
- Demolished: 2002

Jayne Mansfield's Pink Palace was a mansion bought and refurbished with pink paint and fixtures by American actress Jayne Mansfield in 1957. The mansion was demolished in 2002.

== History ==
In November 1957, shortly before her marriage to Mickey Hargitay, Mansfield bought a 40-room Mediterranean-style mansion formerly owned by Rudy Vallée at 10100 Sunset Boulevard in Holmby Hills, Los Angeles. Much of the money she invested in buying the house came from the $81,340 ($932,422 in 2025 dollars) she inherited from her maternal grandfather Elmer Palmer. Mansfield had the house painted pink, with cupids surrounded by pink fluorescent lights, pink furs in the bathrooms, a pink heart-shaped bathtub, and a fountain spurting pink champagne, and then dubbed it the "Pink Palace". It was, according to her, a "pink landmark." Hargitay, a plumber and carpenter before getting into bodybuilding, built a pink heart-shaped swimming pool. Mansfield decorated the Pink Palace by writing to furniture and building suppliers requesting free samples. She received over $150,000 ($1,719,491 in 2025 dollars) in free merchandise, paying only $76,000 ($871,209 in 2025 dollars) for the mansion itself. It was still a large sum, when the average cost of a house at the time was under $7,500 ($85,975 in 2025 dollars).

The Pink Palace was sold after her death and its subsequent owners have included Ringo Starr and Engelbert Humperdinck. In 2002, Humperdinck sold it to developers, and the house was demolished in November of that year.
