= Los Angeles freak scene =

1960s scene centered in Southern California

- Years active: 1960s–1970s
- Location: Los Angeles, California
- Major figures: Vito Paulekas; Frank Zappa; Captain Beefheart; Alice Cooper; The GTOs; Kim Fowley
- Influenced: Hippie

The Los Angeles freak scene (also known as the L.A. freak scene or simply freak scene) was a movement and subculture that emerged in Southern California during the early-to mid 1960s. The scene was led by Vito Paulekas, who in 1961, along with his wife Szou, established a clothing boutique on the corner of Laurel Avenue and Beverly Boulevard in Hollywood, close to Laurel Canyon. Paulekas assembled an expanding group of associates who were referred to as "freaks" or "freakers". His main partner would be Carl Franzoni (aka "Captain Fuck"), described as a "self-styled leader" of the freak scene. These individuals formed part of his dance troupe, which practiced a style of free-form dancing which noted them in Sunset Strip nightclubs as "an acid-drenched extended family of brain-damaged cohabitants". The scene would also be associated with the "freak-out" movement.

Paulekas has been described as the "King of the L.A. freak scene". His freakers would invade rock concerts for prominent local acts such as the Byrds, Love and the Mothers of Invention, which helped garner both the musicians and Vito and his freaks wider notoriety. In July 1965, the Byrds invited Vito and his freakers on a nationwide tour. Writer Barry Miles labeled Vito and his wife Szou as "the first hippies in Hollywood" and "perhaps the first hippies anywhere". In June 1966, Frank Zappa and the Mothers of Invention released their debut album Freak Out! which was a concept album based around the L.A. freak scene. Vito and his freakers would make guest appearances on the album's closing track. The group would be credited alongside musician Kim Fowley and Suzy Creamcheese as "The Mother's Auxiliary".

Artists such as Alice Cooper, the GTOs, Captain Beefheart, Kim Fowley, Frank Zappa, the West Coast Pop Art Experimental Band and Wild Man Fischer have been noted by music journalists as associated with the L.A. freak scene.

== Etymology and characteristics ==
The "Los Angeles freak scene" has been referred to as "the freak scene" by several publications and was part of the various international counterculture and underground culture movements which came to prominence during the 1960s. In July 1968, American musician Frank Zappa, who had previously been a part of the L.A. freak scene, was interviewed by Rolling Stone magazine, where he discussed the difference between "freaks" and hippies, stating:

There's a difference between freaks and hippies. Hippies don't really care what they look like and the freaks care an awful lot. Their packaging and image construction is a very important part of their life style. Now I didn't tell the guys what to wear; I merely suggested their mode of dress conform to what we were doing. I felt you couldn't play the sort of music we were playing and look the way some of the guys did — with processed pompadours. It took a year for some of the guys to change. You have to understand some of the guys lived in Orange County and they were afraid to go home if they looked too weird. After a while they gave in. I haven't talked to them about this in two years.

In 2017, Pitchfork retrospectively labeled the Los Angeles freak scene "a cousin of the Bay Area hippies". According to Shindig! magazine, the movement's "key players" were Frank Zappa and the Mothers of Invention, Captain Beefheart, Kim Fowley and Vito Paulekas. While other acts such as the GTOs and The West Coast Pop Art Experimental Band were also noted as associated.

== History ==
=== 1960s: Origins ===
In 1961, painter, sculptor and former marathon dancing champion Vito Paulekas and his wife Szou established a clothing boutique on the corner of Laurel Avenue and Beverly Boulevard in Hollywood, close to Laurel Canyon. The boutique was credited with being one of the first to introduce "hippie" fashion as well as a brand of free-form dancing that would become associated with hippie culture. Paulekas and his later associate Carl Franzoni (known as "Captain Fuck") were known for their sexual appetites and unconventional behavior. They and an expanding troupe of associates called themselves "freaks" or "freakers", and became well known in the area by about 1963 for their eccentric free-form dancing in Sunset Strip nightclubs, being described as "an acid-drenched extended family of brain-damaged cohabitants".

Vito has been regarded as an early hippie, he provided rehearsal space for local bands such as the Byrds in 1964 and later Love. His antics which included invading local rock concerts with his dance troupe, helped bring attention to several West Coast groups. Vito and his dancers would pioneer a style of free-form dance which became popular amongst hippies. Paulekas and his troupe would later accompany the Byrds on a nationwide tour in July 1965. He would be retroactively described as "a man in his fifties who presided over a harem of predominantly young female 'freakers'". According to Los Angeles Times, Paulekas was the "king of the L.A. 'freak scene'".

Kim Fowley in the October 12, 1966 issue of British music magazine Record Mirror, labeled "Prince of Freak Out"

On the October 12, 1966 issue of British music magazine Record Mirror, writer Norman Jopling interviewed musician and producer Kim Fowley on the emergence of the freak scene:

Well, back in 1934 or something there was this artist called Clay Vito, who lived in California. He had a Beatle hair-cut and all that, and he was the big hippie of the time.Time went by, and Clay made a solid reputation and he began to get interested in music. Well, when rock 'n' roll came along about 1954 him and his crowd began to get interested. There were different stages of rock, you know, the British sound, and Clay had this reputation as a patron. Groups started coming to him. for guidance. One day, five guys came along and were broke-they asked if they could sleep at his studio. They were the Byrds. He also discovered groups like Love and the Leaves, who made "Hey Joe." Nowadays, if anyone opens a new club on the West Coast they have to invite Vito and his crowd. They all wait there eagerly to see if Clay turns up. If he does every thing's OK. It makes the place. You see, Vito's been with this Freak Out movement for years.

==== Musicians ====
In 2003, Barry Miles, who had been one of the founders of the underground newspaper International Times, wrote a retrospective on the early hippie and freak scene in Hollywood, California, stating:

The first hippies in Hollywood, perhaps the first hippies anywhere, were Vito, his wife Zsou [sic], Captain Fuck and their group of about thirty-five dancers. Calling themselves Freaks, they lived a semi-communal life and engaged in sex orgies and free-form dancing whenever they could.

Frank Zappa said of Vito's freaks:

As soon as they arrived they would make things happen, because they were dancing in a way nobody had seen before, screaming and yelling out on the floor and doing all kinds of weird things. They were dressed in a way that nobody could believe, and they gave life to everything that was going on.

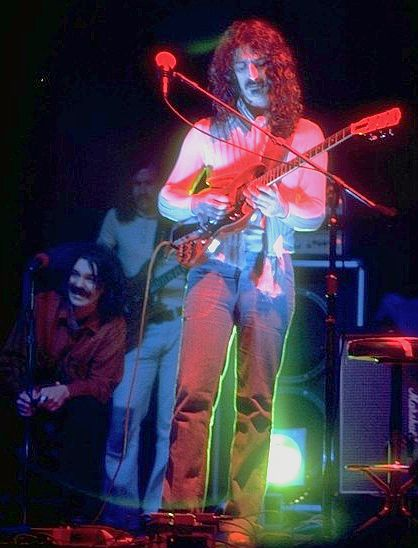
Frank Zappa and Captain Beefheart (left) photographed in a 1975 concert. They have been described as" two giants of the late-60s LA freak scene"

In 1970, music critic Nik Cohn published the book Awopbopaloobop alopbamboom, which briefly discussed Frank Zappa and the Mothers of Invention's debut album Freak Out! (1966): "Bearded and gross and filthy, entirely obscene, they [The Mothers of Invention]...were freaks. They were meant to be. They were playing the same old game again, épater la bourgeoisie, but this time round it wasn't called Dada or Existentialism or Beat, it was Freak-Out. 'On a personal level', wrote Zappa, 'Freaking out is a process whereby an individual casts off outmoded and restricted standards of thinking, dress and social etiquette in order to express CREATIVELY his relationship to his environment and the social structure as a whole'". The album's opening track "Hungry Freaks, Daddy" was written by Zappa for L.A. freak Carl Franzoni, which Louder magazine described as a "self-styled leader of the L.A. freak scene".

According to The Quietus, Freak Out! was "pivotal not only in Zappa's story but the LA freak scene it documents". Pitchfork stated that the album was "Birthed by the theatrical Los Angeles 'freak' scene—a cousin of the Bay Area hippies". Additionally, The Independent claimed Zappa had been a part of the "Los Angeles freak scene," adding, "His disdain for the hippies' cosily acquiescent way of life thrust him closer to the more bizarre outgrowths of the freak scene, which he documented in a series of albums on his Bizarre and Straight labels by such as the groupie collective the GTOs and the sad, mad street busker Wild Man Fischer".

Louder magazine referred to Zappa and Captain Beefheart as "two giants of the late-60s LA freak scene," along with claiming that musician Alice Cooper during the late 1960s "acclimatised their lifestyle to that of the burgeoning Los Angeles freak scene".

In February 1967, the Beach Boys' Mike Love in an interview with Rave magazine, briefly spoke about the L.A. freak scene, stating: "This incomprehensible freak-out scene is not for me. Brian [Wilson] went to a session in the States with this guy called Van Dyke Parks and he claimed his ears were still ringing after seven days!"

== See also ==
- Freak-out (slang)
- Counterculture of the 1960s
- New Age travellers
- Bohemianism
- Hunter S. Thompson's Aspen sheriff campaign
- Free Form Freak-Out
- Freak Power in the Rockies
- Flower children
- UK underground
- Youth International Party
- Freak Scene Musicians
