= Freak Power: The Ballot or the Bomb =

- Directed by: Ajax Phillips, Daniel Joseph Watkins
- Based on: Freak Power: Hunter S. Thompson's Campaign for Sheriff by Daniel Joseph Watkins
- Produced by: Mimi Polk Gitlin; Ajax Phillips; Angus Wall; Daniel Joseph Watkins
- Release date: October 23, 2020
- Running time: 94 minutes
- Country: United States
- Language: English

Freak Power: The Ballot or the Bomb is a 2020 American documentary film directed by Ajax Phillips and Daniel Joseph Watkins, based on the book Freak Power: Hunter S. Thompson's Campaign for Sheriff written by Watkins. The film follows journalist Hunter S. Thompson and his 1970 campaign for sheriff of Pitkin County, Colorado, against the incumbent sheriff Carol Whitmire, whose crackdown on marijuana and loitering aimed to incarcerate and intimidate young hippies, or "freaks", into leaving the area. Thompson created and ran under the third party "Freak Power" ticket, with the strategy of registering hundreds of young voters who had never before participated in the democratic process.

Thompson famously wrote about his campaign and the concept of Freak Power in The Battle of Aspen, his first article for Rolling Stone Magazine.

Due to the COVID-19 pandemic, the documentary could not pursue the traditional film festival circuit and instead was released digitally in the United States on October 23, 2020.

== Synopsis ==
Amidst a backdrop of Nixon-era America, marked by riots, protests, and the war in Vietnam, young journalist Hunter S. Thompson visits the 1968 Democratic National Convention and experiences firsthand the brutality of the Chicago Police Department against protestors, "radicalizing" his political outlook against authoritative uses of force. Thompson realizes the best way to change the system is from the inside out, and begins to organize his campaign for sheriff where his residence is located in Aspen, Colorado.

As Hunter's campaign gains momentum, the incumbent sheriff's supporters begin to use underhanded tactics to malign Hunter and undermine the campaign's credibility. Journalists and news stations from across the US descend on Aspen adding to the tension and antipathy in town in the days leading up to the election. When Hunter starts getting death threats that even the Colorado Bureau of Investigation (CBI) agrees are credible, the fear and paranoia in the campaign spikes, and Hunter and some of his supporters become convinced that someone may try to assassinate him. Hunter's campaign team sets up a nightly armed patrol at his house and vacate their headquarters, which Hunter believes have been bugged.

On election night, Hunter loses by several hundred votes. Though he seems disheartened by his defeat and never runs for public office again, the tide is turning in Aspen. By 1976, one of Hunter's likeminded friends becomes sheriff and Aspen's elected officials begin to reflect the population of one of the most liberal counties in Colorado, enacting many of the policies that Hunter had fought for.

== Production ==
Two years after the release of the book, Travis Fulton, a friend of Watkins, found a reel of 16mm film in his barn that read "Hunter Thompson For Sheriff" on the label. They discovered it was never-before seen footage from the campaign shot by his brother, experimental filmmaker Robert Fulton III. The Fulton family searched their archives and found 40 more reels of footage from Thompson's campaign, five of which had never even been developed for nearly fifty years and had to be carefully processed in order to be salvaged. Watkins also pulled together a collection of 3000 photographs from the campaign by photographers David Hiser and Bob Kreuger.

The production team includes producer Mimi Polk Gitlin (Thelma and Louise, The Breadwinner) and Angus Wall (editor, The Girl With the Dragon Tattoo, The Social Network). The film is edited by Will Znidaric (Winter on Fire), with music by two-time Academy Award-winning composer Gustavo Santaolalla (Brokeback Mountain, Babel) and an original song, "Valley of Last Resort", performed by Gary Clark Jr. and Santaolalla, music by Santaolalla and Gary Clark Jr. with lyrics by Paul Williams.

== Release ==
An Aspen Times article about the documentary stated the film "will be released to video-on-demand services beginning on Oct. 23".
