= Mickey Hargitay =

Hungarian-American actor and bodybuilder (1926–2006)

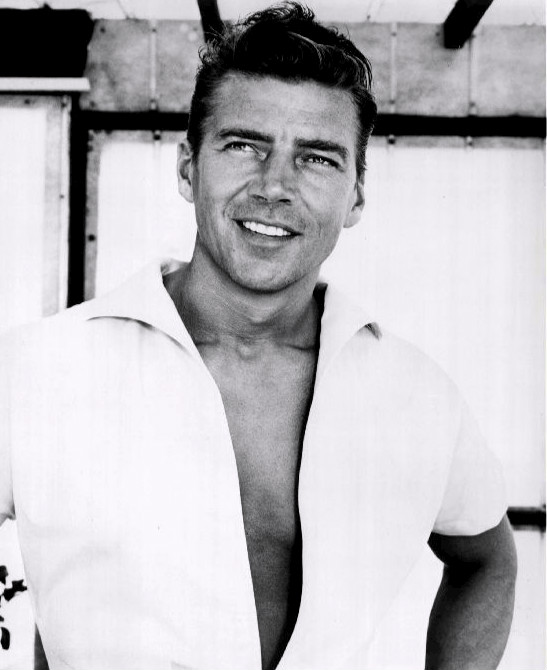
- Hargitay in 1964
- Born: Miklós Károly Hargitay; January 6, 1926; Budapest, then part of Kingdom of Hungary
- Died: September 14, 2006 (aged 80); Los Angeles, California, U.S.
- Occupations: Actor; bodybuilder
- Spouses: Mary Birge (m. 1948; div. 1956) Jayne Mansfield (m. 1958; div. 1964) Ellen Siano (m. 1968)
- Children: 4, including Mariska Hargitay

Signature
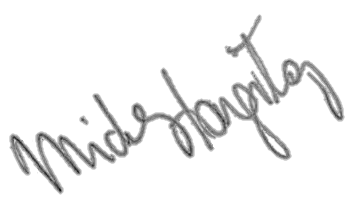

Miklós Károly "Mickey" Hargitay (January 6, 1926 – September 14, 2006) was a Hungarian-American actor and bodybuilder. Born in Budapest, Hargitay immigrated to the United States at age 21 in 1947. Known as "Mickey", he eventually became a naturalized American citizen. He became known as a competitive bodybuilder, helping to popularize the sport and winning Mr. Universe in 1955. His bodybuilding gave him an entree to acting. In 1958, Hargitay married actress Jayne Mansfield. Hargitay and Mansfield made four movies together: Will Success Spoil Rock Hunter? (1957), The Loves of Hercules (1960), Promises! Promises! (1963), and Primitive Love (1964).

== Early life and early career ==
Miklós Károly Hargitay was born in Budapest, then part of Kingdom of Hungary on January 6, 1926. His parents were Ferenc Hargitay and Mária Hargitay (née Rothfischer). Hargitay's father was an acrobat. During his youth, Hargitay was part of an acrobatic act with his brother. After being introduced to speed skating by his brother, Hargitay began competing in meets. In 1946, he won the Central European championship at 500 and 1,500 meters, and placed second in the 5,000 meter race. He was also a proficient football player, and was a resistance fighter during World War II.

In 1947, aged 21, Hargitay emigrated from Hungary to the United States to avoid being drafted into military service by the Soviet Union. Hargitay settled in Indianapolis, where he worked as a plumber and carpenter. He also performed in an acrobatic act with his first wife, Mary Birge. He was inspired to begin bodybuilding after seeing a magazine cover featuring Steve Reeves. Hargitay won the National Amateur Body-Builders' Association (NABBA) Mr. Universe award in 1955.

Hargitay is credited with influencing the enormous interest in physical fitness prevalent in the US during the 1950s. He appeared as a pin-up model in fitness magazines. After Mae West saw his photo on a magazine cover, she recruited Hargitay for her muscleman revue.

== Acting career ==
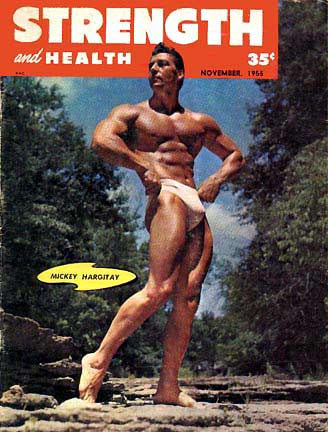
Hargitay on the cover of the November 1955 issue of Strength & Health

Hargitay's first film role came when Jayne Mansfield demanded that he be cast in her movie, Will Success Spoil Rock Hunter? (1957).

In 1960, Hargitay and Mansfield played the lead roles in The Loves of Hercules. Over the next four years, Hargitay and Mansfield would appear together in Promises! Promises! (1963) and Primitive Love (1964). In 1965, Hargitay played the lead role in Bloody Pit of Horror without Mansfield.

Hargitay's acting career was not limited to the United States; he also appeared in many Italian productions, and acted in Hungarian director György Szomjas' 1988 film, Mr. Universe.

In 2003, Hargitay guest-starred on Law & Order: Special Victims Unit. He played the role of a witness to a violent crime.

== Personal life ==
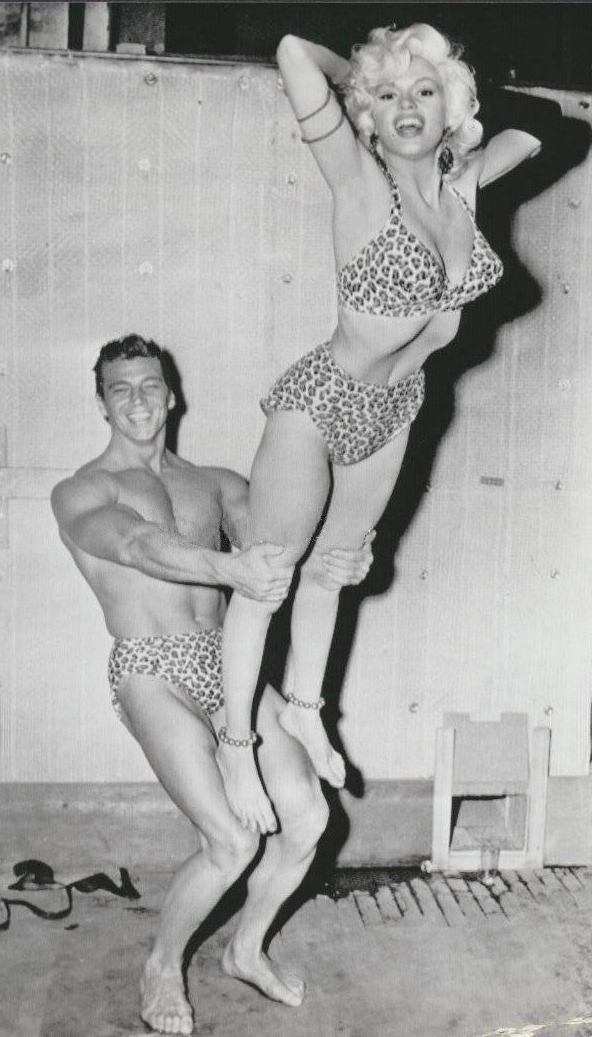
Hargitay with Mansfield in Los Angeles in 1956

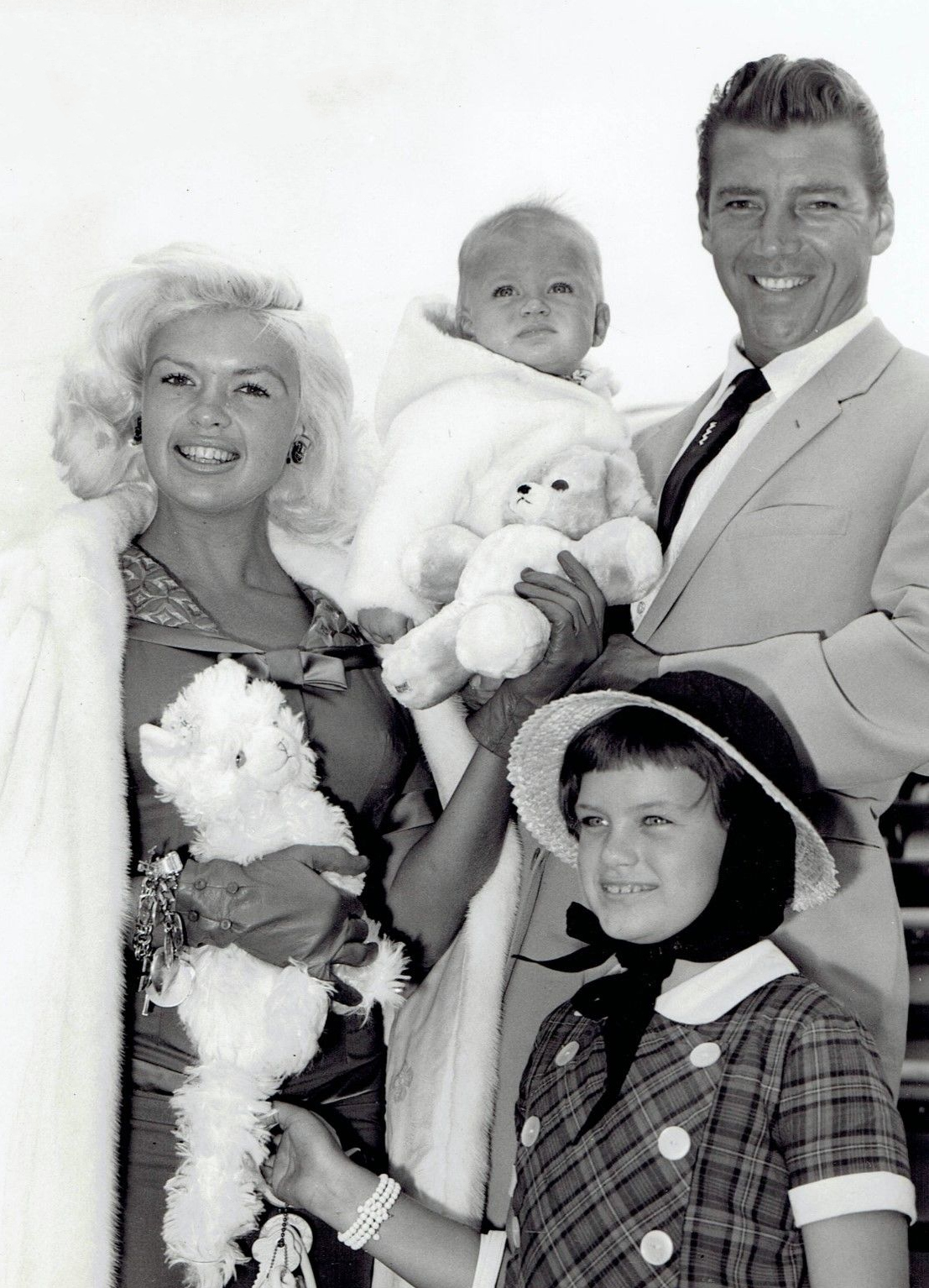
Hargitay with Mansfield and children in London in 1959

Hargitay's first wife was fellow acrobat Mary Birge. He and Birge had a daughter. The couple later divorced.

Hargitay and Jayne Mansfield met in 1956 while he was performing in The Mae West Show at the Latin Quarter. When Mansfield noticed Hargitay performing, she allegedly told the waiter, "I'll have a steak and that tall man on the left". Hargitay proposed to Mansfield on November 6, 1957, with a 10-carat diamond ring. On January 13, 1958, Hargitay and Mansfield married at the Wayfarers Chapel in Rancho Palos Verdes, California. Hargitay built the famous heart-shaped swimming pool at his and Mansfield's Beverly Hills mansion, known as The Pink Palace.

Hargitay and Mansfield had two sons. Mansfield also had a daughter while married to Hargitay named Mariska Hargitay in 1964; she was raised as one of Mickey Hargitay's children. She grew up to become an actress. On April 30, 1963, Mansfield obtained a divorce from Hargitay in Juarez, Mexico. Hargitay and Mansfield reconciled in October 1963. After Mariska Hargitay was born, Mansfield sued to get the Juarez divorce declared legal; the divorce was recognized on August 26, 1964. A court decree in June 1967 made Hargitay the guardian of the three children including Mariska Hargitay, although they continued to live with Mansfield. Mansfield died in an automobile accident in 1967. Shortly after Mansfield's funeral, Hargitay sued her estate, but lost.

In May 2025, Mariska Hargitay confirmed that singer-comedian Nelson Sardelli was her biological father. She had believed Mickey Hargitay to be her biological father until she was 25. Mariska Hargitay has stated that when she questioned Hargitay about her paternity, he denied that Sardelli was her father.

Hargitay married Ellen Siano on April 14, 1968. They remained married until his death.

== Death ==
On September 14, 2006, Hargitay died in Los Angeles, California, aged 80, from multiple myeloma. In Hargitay's obituary, the Los Angeles Times quoted bodybuilding historian Gene Mozee as stating:

Walter Winchell once said that what [President] Eisenhower did for golf, Mickey Hargitay did for bodybuilding, because he brought it to the forefront... Back in those days, bodybuilding was thought of as a freakish, unusual activity that wasn't popular with the general public... At that time, athletic coaches discouraged lifting weights, thinking you'd become musclebound. And along came Mickey Hargitay, a great all-around athlete.

== In popular culture ==
Hargitay was portrayed by Arnold Schwarzenegger in the 1980 television film The Jayne Mansfield Story.

== Filmography ==
=== Film ===
Year	Title	Role
1957	Will Success Spoil Rock Hunter?	Bobo Branigansky
1957	Slaughter on Tenth Avenue	Big John
1960	The Loves of Hercules	Hercules
1963	Promises! Promises!	King Banner
1964	Primitive Love	Hotel Bell Captain
1964	La vendetta dei gladiatori	Fabius
1965	Stranger in Sacramento	Mike Jordan
1965	Sheriff Won't Shoot	Allan Day
1965	Bloody Pit of Horror	Travis Anderson
1966	Three Bullets for Ringo	Ringo Carson
1966	Sette donne d'oro contro due 07	Mark Davis
1967	Cjamango	Clinton
1970	Ringo, It's Massacre Time	Mike Wood
1971	Lady Frankenstein	Captain Harris
1972	Delirium	Herbert Lyutak
1973	Black Magic Rites	Jack Nelson
2001	Szemétdomb	Mickey

=== Television ===
Year	Title	Role	Notes
1968	The Wild Wild West	Monk	Episode: "The Night of the Fugitives"
1972	Cool Million	Frederick	Episode: "Mask of Marcella"
2003	Law & Order: Special Victims Unit	Grandfather on escalator	Episode: "Control"; final appearance
