= The Loves of Hercules =

1960 film

- Directed by: Carlo Ludovico Bragaglia
- Screenplay by: Sandro Continenza; Luciano Doria
- Story by: Alberto Manca
- Produced by: Alberto Manca
- Starring: Jayne Mansfield; Mickey Hargitay; Massimo Serato; Rene Dary
- Cinematography: Enzo Serafin
- Edited by: Renato Cinquini
- Music by: Carlo Innocenzi
- Production companies: Grandi Schermi Italani; Contact Organization; Paris Productions (PIP)
- Release date: 19 August 1960 (Italy)
- Running time: 97 minutes
- Countries: Italy; France
- Languages: Italian; English

The Loves of Hercules (Italian: Gli amori di Ercole) is a 1960 international co-production film starring Jayne Mansfield and her then husband Mickey Hargitay. The film was distributed internationally as Hercules vs. the Hydra.

== Plot ==
While Hercules (Hargitay) is away, his village is plundered and his wife is killed by the army of Ecalia, a country ruled by King Eurysteus. Licos (Massimo Serato), chief minister to the king, sees an opportunity to seize the throne himself. Licos knows that Hercules will come to Ecalia for vengeance; as the first part of his plan, he murders the king, planning to claim he died in battle to ensure that he does not bring ruin on Ecalia by resisting Hercules. While consulting an oracle, Hercules learns of the murder of his wife from a survivor and seeks vengeance. The newly crowned Queen Deianira (Mansfield), daughter of the king, offers her life to Hercules in order to spare Ecalia, as Licos anticipated. Hercules offers mercy, but by law, the Queen and Hercules must participate in a rite to appease the goddess of justice. Deianira is bound to a wall as Hercules throws axes toward her, attempting to sever her bonds. He succeeds, proving her innocence to her people. Licos hatches another scheme to wed Deianira and rule through her.

Hercules admires Deianira and her bravery. While escorting Deianira back to her capital, they come across a band of peasants who have been attacked by a monster. As Hercules seeks the monster, their cattle are stampeded and Hercules kills a wild bull with his dagger. Arriving in the city, Hercules discovers Deinaira is betrothed to a man named Achelous, whom Licos has sent to the couple, expecting Achelous to challenge Hercules and be killed, thereby alienating Hercules from Deianira and removing Achelous as a rival for her hand in marriage. The plan nearly succeeds, but Deinaira successfully begs Hercules to stay his hand. Hercules decides to leave Ecalia and Deinaira behind him.

Licos follows through on the plan anyway, ordering Achelous' murder with the dagger Hercules left behind in the bull; he does not expect Hercules to return to defend himself. Licos is foiled again, however, when one of Hercules' companions finds him on the road and informs him that he is accused of the murder; Hercules decides to clear his name. Licos sends the actual murderer, Philoctetes, into hiding beyond the gates of the Underworld. Licos intends for Hercules to follow Philoctetes to prove his innocence, and for both men to be killed by the monstrous Hydra. Believing that his plan is working, Licos attempts to convince Deianira to marry him, but she is hesitant.

Philoctetes is killed by the Hydra. Hercules kills the Hydra, but their battle weakens him into unconsciousness. He's rescued by Amazons loyal to Queen Hippolyta (Tina Gloriana). Hippolyta turns her lovers into living trees after growing tired of them, but Hercules is only interested in Deinaira. Angered that he is interested in Deinaira but determined to make Hercules her lover, Hippolyta's advisor suggests the only way she can gain the attention of Hercules is to change her face and body through magic to resemble Deianira (Mansfield with red hair). Meanwhile, Deianira discovers Licos' scheming and he has her imprisoned. Hercules manages to escape with his life due to the intervention of the Amazon, Nemea (Moira Orfei), at the cost of her own life, while Hippolyta is crushed to death by one of the trees. Hercules is informed of Licos' treachery and returns to Ecalia at the head of an army to overthrow him.

Defeated in battle, Licos tries to escape Ecalia with Deianira as a hostage, but he is strangled to death by the monster, Alcione, who is in turn killed by Hercules as he rescues Deianira.

== Main cast ==
Actor	Role
Mickey Hargitay	Hercules
Jayne Mansfield	Queen Deianira / Hippolyta
Massimo Serato	Licos
René Dary	General
Moira Orfei	Némée
Gil Vidal	Achelous

== Production notes ==
This was one of the earlier movies to follow from Italy in the wake of the success of Hercules (1958) starring Steve Reeves, and marked an attempt to add some star power to the notion of a muscleman movie, not so much in the title role as the female lead.

Filmed on location in Italy during the height of the sword and sandal craze, this was not one of Jayne Mansfield's "loan out" films. Mansfield was offered the film while she was shooting The Sheriff of Fractured Jaw in Spain; she agreed on the condition that her husband Mickey Hargitay played Hercules. She received a fee of $75,000 for starring in the movie. Mansfield received permission from her studio 20th Century Fox to film this movie in the early weeks of 1960 whilst she was four months pregnant. A hit in Italy, it was later broadcast as a movie of the week in 1966 on American television and has since gained a cult following.

The scene where Mickey Hargitay wrestles a bull was prepared by treating the animal with tranquilizers first.

On April 14, 2017, the film was featured in the eleventh season of Mystery Science Theater 3000 as episode 1108.

== Release ==
The film was released in Italy on August 19, 1960, with a 97-minute running time. The film was released in the United States in 1966 with a 98-minute running time.

== See also ==
- List of films featuring Hercules
