= Primitive Love (film) =

1964 film by Luigi Scattini

- Theatrical release poster
- Italian: L'amore primitivo
- Directed by: Luigi Scattini
- Screenplay by: Amedeo Sollazzo
- Story by: Massimo Pupillo; Luigi Scattini
- Produced by: Pier Paolo Giordani; Fulvio Lucisano
- Starring: Franco Franchi; Ciccio Ingrassia; Jayne Mansfield; Mickey Hargitay
- Cinematography: Claudio Racca
- Edited by: Otello Colangeli
- Music by: Lallo Gori
- Production companies: G.L.M.; Italian International Film
- Distributed by: CIC
- Release date: 31 July 1964 (Italy)
- Running time: 83 minutes
- Country: Italy
- Language: Italian

Primitive Love (Italian: L'amore primitivo) is a 1964 Italian sex comedy film directed by Luigi Scattini and starring Franco Franchi, Ciccio Ingrassia, Jayne Mansfield and Mickey Hargitay. The film attempts to combine a typical Mansfield sex comedy with the mondo film genre by including footage of various native customs and rituals from around the world.

It was filmed in Italy in May 1964.

== Cast ==
- Franco Franchi as Franco, a hotel porter
- Ciccio Ingrassia as Ciccio, a hotel porter
- Jayne Mansfield as Dr. Jane (dubbed by Carolyn De Fonseca)
- Mickey Hargitay as the hotel bell captain
- Carlo Kechler as the professor

== Production ==
The film was originally conceived as a mondo film, but after shooting most of it the producers considered the footage unusable upon reviewing it; in an effort to use the material and recover their investment, Scattini and Lucisano hastily booked Mansfield and Franco and Ciccio, and reworked it into a comedy.

== Reception ==
The film was a major success, grossing nearly one billion lire at the Italian box office. It is regarded as a precursor to the Italian sex comedy genre of the 1970s.
