= The Battle of Aspen =

1970 article by Hunter S. Thompson

"The Battle of Aspen" is an article published in Rolling Stone No. 67, dated October 1, 1970, and written by Hunter S. Thompson. The cover of the magazine ran the teaser "Freak Power in the Rockies," and the article was later reprinted with that title in The Great Shark Hunt.

The article's subject is the 1969 mayoral election in Aspen, Colorado, in particular the candidacy of Joe Edwards, a lawyer, "biker" and non-conformist resident of Aspen. It also details the Freak Power platform Thompson himself was to adopt while running for Sheriff of Pitkin County, Colorado, the subsequent year.

== Background ==
Though unsuccessful, the Edwards campaign was notable for its attempt to garner nearly all of its support from "freaks," "heads," and "dropouts" from the surrounding areas—Freak Power, as it was dubbed. Thompson, who became de facto campaign manager for Edwards during the race, devotes much of the article to the local politics of Aspen and the entrenched politicians it supports. Simultaneously a screed against politicians who sacrifice the quality of life of their constituents for short term gain or notoriety, and an outline of optimism regarding the possibility of the marginalized to take power, the article details the campaign from its inception through the run-up to election and ends with a consideration of the results and the impact they may have had.

== Thompson's campaign for sheriff ==
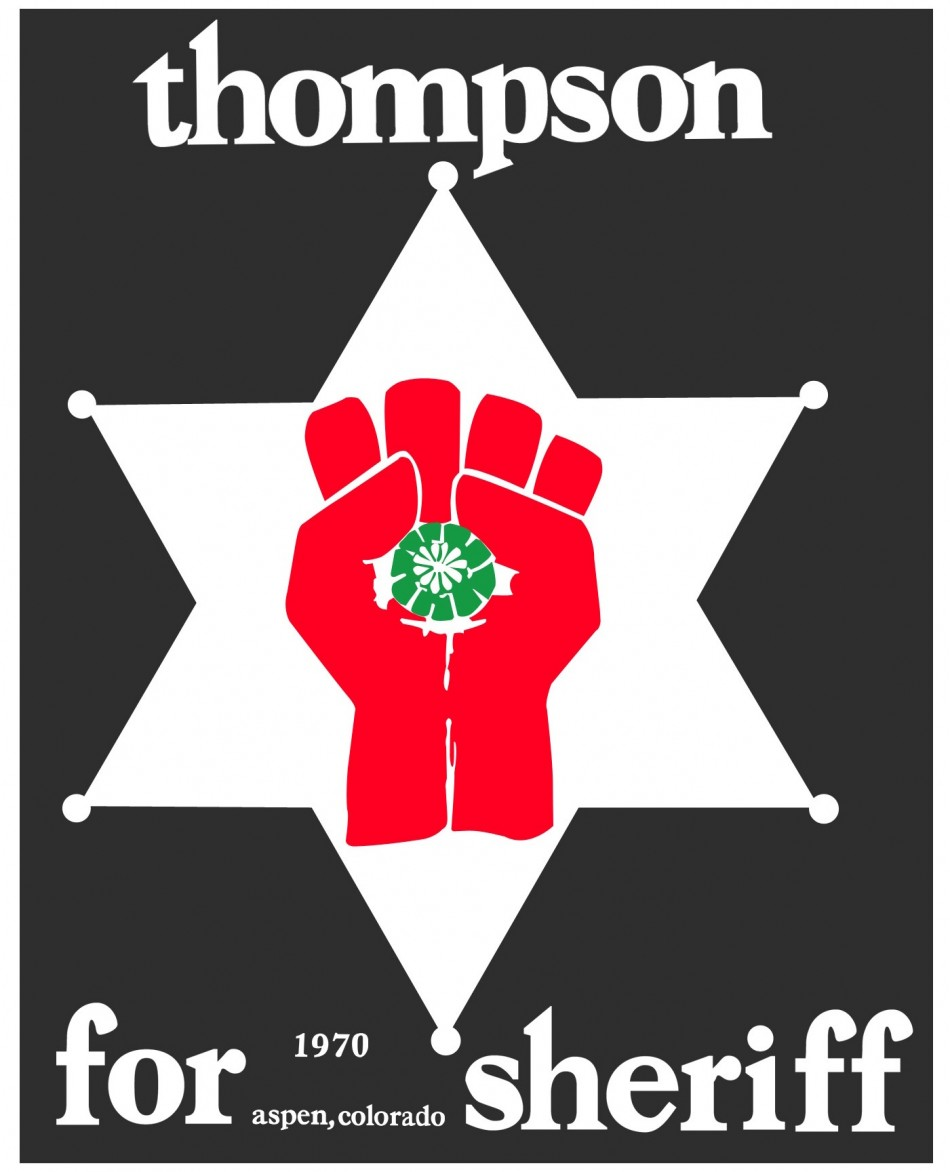
Thompson campaign poster illustrated by Tom Benton

The next year, therefore, Thompson put together a campaign to elect himself as Sheriff. It combined aggressive radicalism, a higher level of organization than the previous Freak Power campaign, more controversy and danger as well as some frivolous moments. His tentative platform set forth six points, including:

- "Rip up all city streets with jackhammers" and "sod the streets at once ... All public movement would be by foot and a fleet of bicycles, maintained by the city police force."
- "Change the name 'Aspen,' by public referendum, to 'Fat City.' This would prevent greedheads, land-rapers and other human jackals from capitalizing on the name 'Aspen' ... These swine should be fucked, broken, and driven across the land."
- "Drug Sales must be controlled. My first act as Sheriff will be to install, on the courthouse lawn, a bastinado platform and a set of stocks in order to punish dishonest dope dealers in a proper public fashion. Each year these dealers cheat millions of people out of millions of dollars ... it will be the general philosophy of the Sheriff’s office that no drug worth taking should be sold for money."
- "Hunting and fishing should be forbidden to all non-residents, with the exception of those who can obtain the signed endorsement of a resident- who will then be legally responsible for any violation or abuse committed by the non-resident he has 'signed for' ... By this approach-making hundreds or even thousands of individuals personally responsible for protecting the animals, fish and birds who live here-we would create a sort of de facto game preserve, without the harsh restrictions that will necessarily be forced on us if these blood-thirsty geeks keep swarming in here each autumn to shoot everything they see."
- "The Sheriff and his Deputies should never be armed in public. Every urban riot, shoot-out and blood-bath (involving guns) in recent memory has been set off by some trigger-happy cop in a fear frenzy."
- "It will be the policy of the Sheriff's office savagely to harass all those engaged in any form of land-rape."

Thompson promised to fire the majority of the conservative county officials and bureaucrats, and shaved his head bald, thereby referring to the crew-cut, ex-army, Republican incumbent as "My long-haired opponent."

Threats received by Thompson during the campaign included one sent to City Hall following a dynamite theft in the County, insisting that the explosives would only be used if Thompson was elected. This led to Thompson's house and campaign HQ at Woody Creek, Colorado, taking on the aspect of an armed camp on election night, with guards patrolling the grounds with guns and flashlights.

Ultimately, the "Thompson for Sheriff" campaign was also unsuccessful, partly due to a Republican–Democratic agreement not to stand against each other in certain key elections in order to allow all 'Non-Thompson' votes to count towards one candidate and partly due to an article Thompson wrote for Rolling Stone shortly before the election, revealing his strategy. Thompson lost the election with 173 votes to his opponent's 204.

In a November 1970 letter to the editor of The Nation, which had run an editorial supporting Aspen's Freak Power Uprising, Thompson stated: "What neither The Times nor The National Observer said, incidentally, is that we ran straight at the bastards with an out-front Mescaline platform." Thompson ultimately took a resigned view of his defeat, telling The New York Times, "If we can't win in Aspen, we can't win anywhere."

== Results of the mayoral campaign and Sheriff election ==
In both the 1969 Mayor's election and the 1970 Sheriff election, Edwards and Thompson narrowly lost to more conservative candidates. A coalition of the Democratic and Republican candidates during the Mayor's election (along with mail votes and alleged vote-fixing) managed to defeat Edwards by 6 votes (although there were 5 absentee ballots for Edwards, but they did not arrive in time to count), which Thompson said had confirmed his suspicion that both Aspen and America at large could be more radical than he had imagined, and thus that a "Freak Power" campaign on a local or national scale could work.

== Related media ==
- A documentary film about Hunter S. Thompson's campaign for sheriff called Freak Power: The Ballot or the Bomb was released December 25, 2020.
- In July 2021 a film called 'Fear and Loathing in Aspen' was released. It was directed by Bobby Kennedy III.
- In 1970, This Week, a British weekly current affairs television programme aired a documentary titled: "Show Down at Aspen"
