= Trish Adlesic =

American director and producer

- Born: Patricia Adlesic; Pittsburgh, Pennsylvania, U.S.
- Education: Hunter College
- Occupations: Film director; producer; location manager
- Years active: 1990–present

Patricia "Trish" Adlesic is an American documentary film director and producer. She has been nominated for two Academy Awards.

== Early life ==
Adlesic was born in Pittsburgh, the youngest of six children of Mary and Joseph Adlesic; her mother was a nurse and her father worked in education. She is of Irish and Slovenian descent. She graduated from Shaler Area High School and attended Hunter College, majoring in communications and psychology with a minor in music theory.

== Career ==
She worked as a location manager on Law & Order: Special Victims Unit, where she met actress Mariska Hargitay. When Hargitay wanted to make a documentary about the American rape kit backlog, she asked Adlesic to co-direct. The documentary, titled I Am Evidence, was released in 2017. The following year, Adlesic had been visiting her father in Pittsburgh when the Pittsburgh synagogue shooting occurred. After the shooting, she moved back to Pittsburgh and spent the next three years directing and co-producing A Tree of Life: The Pittsburgh Synagogue Shooting. In 2025, she collaborated once again with Mariska Hargitay, producing Hargitay's feature directorial debut film My Mom Jayne, which premiered at the 78th Cannes Film Festival.

== Filmography ==
=== As director and producer ===
Year	Title	Director	Producer	Notes	Ref.
2010	Gasland	No	Yes		
2013	Gasland Part II	No	Yes		
2017	I Am Evidence	Yes	No		
2022	A Tree of Life: The Pittsburgh Synagogue Shooting	Yes	Yes		
2022	Pay or Die	No	Executive		
2023	The ABCs of Book Banning	Yes	Yes	Short film	
2025	My Mom Jayne	No	Yes		
2025	Nuns vs. The Vatican	No	Executive		
2026	The Gymnasts of Fisherman Colony	No	Executive		

=== Other credits ===
==== Film ====
Year	Title	Notes	Ref.
1993	Household Saints	Post-production supervisor	
1995	The Basketball Diaries	Assistant location manager	
1996	Night Falls on Manhattan	Assistant location manager	
1997	Gold in the Streets	Location manager	
1997	As Good as It Gets	Assistant location manager	
1998	Black Dog	Location manager	
1998	My Husband's Secret Life	Location manager	
1998	Meet Joe Black	Assistant location manager	
1999	The Insider	Location manager	
2000	Finding Forrester	Location manager	
2000	Looking for an Echo	Production supervisor	
2002	In America	Production supervisor	
2005	Get Rich or Die Tryin'	Production supervisor	
2007	Dinosaurs Alive!	Unit production manager	

==== Television ====
Year	Title	Notes	Ref.
1990–1993	Law & Order	Location coordinator	
1994–1995	The Cosby Mysteries	Location manager	
1999–2014	Law & Order: Special Victims Unit	Location manager	

== Awards and nominations ==
Award	Year	Category	Nominated work	Result	Ref.
Academy Awards	2011	Best Documentary Feature Film	Gasland	Nominated	
Academy Awards	2024	Best Documentary Short Film	The ABCs of Book Banning	Nominated	
Cinema Eye Honors	2019	Outstanding Achievement in a Nonfiction Film for Broadcast	I Am Evidence	Nominated	
Cleveland International Film Festival	2018	ReelWomenDirect Award for Excellence in Directing by a Woman	I Am Evidence	Nominated	
Cleveland International Film Festival	2018	Local Heroes Competition	I Am Evidence	Nominated	
Hamptons International Film Festival	2017	Victor Rabinowitz and Joanne Grant Award for Social Justice	I Am Evidence	Won	
News and Documentary Emmy Awards	2014	Outstanding Individual Achievement in a Craft: Research	Gasland Part II	Nominated	
News and Documentary Emmy Awards	2019	Best Documentary	I Am Evidence	Won	
News and Documentary Emmy Awards	2019	Outstanding Investigative Documentary	I Am Evidence	Nominated	
Primetime Emmy Awards	2011	Exceptional Merit in Documentary Filmmaking	Gasland	Nominated	
Producers Guild of America Awards	2026	Outstanding Producer of Documentary Theatrical Motion Pictures	My Mom Jayne	Won	
Provincetown International Film Festival	2017	Audience Award for Best Documentary	I Am Evidence	Won	
Traverse City Film Festival	2017	Best Documentary Film	I Am Evidence	Won	
Windsor International Film Festival	2017	Women of WIFF	I Am Evidence	Won	
