= List of awards and nominations received by Mariska Hargitay =

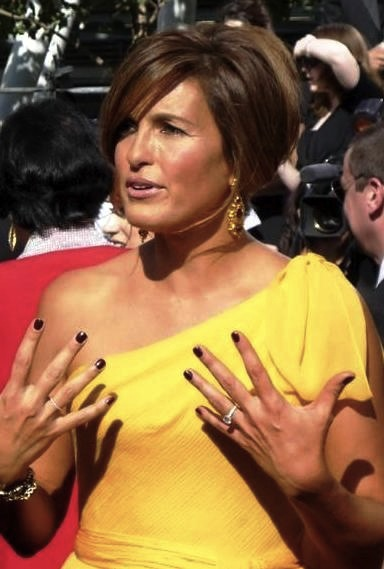
Mariska Hargitay at the Emmy Awards in 2008

This article is a list of awards and nominations received by Mariska Hargitay.

Mariska Hargitay is an American actress known for her roles in television. Over her career she has received several awards including three Primetime Emmy Awards, a News and Documentary Emmy Award, a Golden Globe Award, two People Choice Awards, and an MTV Video Music Award.

She is best known for her role as Detective Olivia Benson in the NBC police procedural crime drama series Law & Order: Special Victims Unit (1999–present). The role earned her eight nominations for the Primetime Emmy Award for Outstanding Lead Actress in a Drama Series winning once at the 58th Primetime Emmy Awards for the episode "911" (2006). She won the Golden Globe Award for Best Actress in a Television Series – Drama at the 62nd Golden Globe Awards. She also earned nominations for six Screen Actors Guild Awards for Outstanding Performance by a Female Actor in a Drama Series.

She won the News and Documentary Emmy Award for Best Documentary for producing the HBO documentary I Am Evidence (2017) about the investigation into rape kits. At the 2015 MTV Video Music Awards she won the Video of the Year Award for the Taylor Swift music video "Bad Blood".

== Major associations ==
=== Actor Awards ===
Year	Category	Nominated work	Result	Ref.
2003	Outstanding Performance by a Female Actor in a Drama Series	Law & Order: Special Victims Unit	Nominated	
2005	Outstanding Performance by a Female Actor in a Drama Series	Law & Order: Special Victims Unit	Nominated	
2006	Outstanding Performance by a Female Actor in a Drama Series	Law & Order: Special Victims Unit	Nominated	
2008	Outstanding Performance by a Female Actor in a Drama Series	Law & Order: Special Victims Unit	Nominated	
2009	Outstanding Performance by a Female Actor in a Drama Series	Law & Order: Special Victims Unit	Nominated	
2010	Outstanding Performance by a Female Actor in a Drama Series	Law & Order: Special Victims Unit	Nominated	

=== Emmy Awards ===
Year	Category	Nominated work	Result	Ref.
Primetime Emmy Awards
2004	Outstanding Lead Actress in a Drama Series	Law & Order: Special Victims Unit (Episode: "Control")	Nominated	
2005	Outstanding Lead Actress in a Drama Series	Law & Order: Special Victims Unit (Episode: "Charisma")	Nominated	
2006	Outstanding Lead Actress in a Drama Series	Law & Order: Special Victims Unit (Episode: "911")	Won	
2007	Outstanding Lead Actress in a Drama Series	Law & Order: Special Victims Unit (Episode: "Florida")	Nominated	
2008	Outstanding Lead Actress in a Drama Series	Law & Order: Special Victims Unit (Episode: "Undercover")	Nominated	
2009	Outstanding Lead Actress in a Drama Series	Law & Order: Special Victims Unit (Episode: "PTSD")	Nominated	
2010	Outstanding Lead Actress in a Drama Series	Law & Order: Special Victims Unit (Episode: "Perverted")	Nominated	
2011	Outstanding Lead Actress in a Drama Series	Law & Order: Special Victims Unit (Episode: "Rescue")	Nominated	
2026	Outstanding Documentary or Nonfiction Special	My Mom Jayne: A Film by Mariska Hargitay	Won	
2026	Outstanding Directing for a Documentary/Nonfiction Program	My Mom Jayne: A Film by Mariska Hargitay	Won	
News and Documentary Emmy Awards
2017	Best Documentary	I Am Evidence	Won	
2017	Outstanding Investigative Documentary	I Am Evidence	Nominated	

=== Golden Globe Awards ===
Year	Category	Nominated work	Result	Ref.
2004	Best Actress in a Television Series – Drama	Law & Order: Special Victims Unit	Won	
2008	Best Actress in a Television Series – Drama	Law & Order: Special Victims Unit	Nominated	

=== Producers Guild of America Awards ===
Year	Category	Nominated work	Result	Ref.
2025	Outstanding Producer of Documentary Theatrical Motion Pictures	My Mom Jayne: A Film by Mariska Hargitay	Won	

== Miscellaneous awards ==
Organizations	Year	Category	Work	Result	Ref.
AARP Movies for Grownups Awards	2025	Best Documentary	My Mom Jayne: A Film by Mariska Hargitay	Won	
Astra Film Awards	2025	Best Documentary Feature	My Mom Jayne: A Film by Mariska Hargitay	Nominated	
Astra TV Awards	2021	Best Actress in a Broadcast Network or Cable Series, Drama	Law & Order: Special Victims Unit	Nominated	
Astra TV Awards	2024	Best Actress in a Broadcast Network or Cable Drama Series	Law & Order: Special Victims Unit	Won	
Cannes Film Festival	2025	L'Œil d'or	My Mom Jayne: A Film by Mariska Hargitay	Nominated	
Cinema Eye Honors	2025	Outstanding Broadcast Film	My Mom Jayne: A Film by Mariska Hargitay	Nominated	
Critics' Choice Documentary Awards	2025	Best First Documentary Feature	My Mom Jayne: A Film by Mariska Hargitay	Won	
Critics' Choice Documentary Awards	2025	Best Biographical Documentary	My Mom Jayne: A Film by Mariska Hargitay	Nominated	
Gotham TV Awards	2024	Anniversary Tribute	Law & Order: Special Victims Unit	Won	
Gracie Allen Awards	2004	Individual Achievement for Best Female Lead – Drama – Series	Law & Order: Special Victims Unit	Won	
Gracie Allen Awards	2009	Outstanding Female Lead – Drama Series	Law & Order: Special Victims Unit	Won	
Gracie Allen Awards	2014	Outstanding Female Lead – Drama Series	Law & Order: Special Victims Unit	Won	
Gracie Allen Awards	2017	Outstanding Female Actor in a Leading Role in a Drama	Law & Order: Special Victims Unit	Won	
MTV Video Music Awards	2015	Video of the Year	"Bad Blood"	Won	
Muse Awards	2012	New York Women in Film & Television	Law & Order: Special Victims Unit	Won	
People's Choice Awards	2009	Favorite Female TV Star	Law & Order: Special Victims Unit	Nominated	
People's Choice Awards	2010	Favorite TV Drama Actress	Law & Order: Special Victims Unit	Nominated	
People's Choice Awards	2011	Favorite TV Crime Fighter	Law & Order: Special Victims Unit	Nominated	
People's Choice Awards	2014	Best Dramatic Actress	Law & Order: Special Victims Unit	Nominated	
People's Choice Awards	2015	Favorite Crime Drama TV Actress	Law & Order: Special Victims Unit	Nominated	
People's Choice Awards	2016	Favorite Crime Drama TV Actress	Law & Order: Special Victims Unit	Nominated	
People's Choice Awards	2017	Favorite Crime Drama TV Actress	Law & Order: Special Victims Unit	Nominated	
People's Choice Awards	2018	The Drama TV Star of 2018	Law & Order: Special Victims Unit	Won	
People's Choice Awards	2020	The Female TV Star of 2020	Law & Order: Special Victims Unit	Nominated	
People's Choice Awards	2020	The Drama TV Star of 2020	Law & Order: Special Victims Unit	Nominated	
People's Choice Awards	2021	The Female TV Star of 2021	Law & Order: Special Victims Unit	Nominated	
People's Choice Awards	2021	The Drama TV Star of 2021	Law & Order: Special Victims Unit	Nominated	
People's Choice Awards	2022	The Drama TV Star of 2022	Law & Order: Special Victims Unit	Won	
People's Choice Awards	2022	The Female TV Star of 2022	Law & Order: Special Victims Unit	Nominated	
People's Choice Awards	2023	The Drama TV Star of the Year	Law & Order: Special Victims Unit	Nominated	
People's Choice Awards	2023	The Female TV Star of the Year	Law & Order: Special Victims Unit	Nominated	
Premi Flaiano	2024	International Flaiano Award	Law & Order: Special Victims Unit	Won	
Satellite Awards	1999	Best Actress in a Series, Drama	Law & Order: Special Victims Unit	Nominated	
TV Guide Awards	2000	Favorite Actress in a New Series	Law & Order: Special Victims Unit	Nominated	
TV Guide Awards	2012	Favorite Actress	Law & Order: Special Victims Unit	Nominated	
TV Guide Awards	2014	Favorite Actress	Law & Order: Special Victims Unit	Nominated	
TV Land Awards	2007	Favorite Lady Gumshoe	Law & Order: Special Victims Unit	Nominated	
Viewers for Quality Television Awards	2000	Best Actress in a Quality Drama Series	Law & Order: Special Victims Unit	Nominated	
