= Jayne Marie Mansfield =

American film actress and playmate (born 1950)

- Born: November 8, 1950 (age 75); Dallas, Texas, U.S.
- Occupations: Movie actress; Playboy Playmate; model
- Known for: First Playboy pictorial model whose mother was a Playmate
- Spouse: Barry Lang (m. 1970, divorced)
- Children: 1
- Parent: Jayne Mansfield (mother)
- Relatives: Mariska Hargitay (half-sister)

Jayne Marie Mansfield (born November 8, 1950) is an American film actress and model. She is the first child and eldest daughter of 1950s Hollywood sex symbol and Playboy Playmate Jayne Mansfield, with the putative father being Mansfield's ex-husband Paul Mansfield. Mansfield is also the elder half-sister of actress Mariska Hargitay and had three other half-siblings.

In July 1976, Mansfield became the first daughter of a Playmate to be a featured model in Playboy magazine. To date, only one other daughter of a Playmate has been featured in the magazine. Additionally, Mansfield is the only model who was featured in 100 Beautiful Women along with her mother in the magazine's 1988 special issue.

She has acted in the film Olly, Olly, Oxen Free (1978) and TV production Blond in Hollywood (2003).

== Biography ==
Jayne Marie was born at St Paul’s University Hospital in Dallas on November 8, 1950. Her mother and Paul Mansfield married that year when her mother was 17 and three months pregnant, and Paul was 20. Some sources say Paul was her father; others say the pregnancy was the result of date rape.

The family moved frequently when Jayne Marie was young. They divorced and her mother married twice more, having a total of four more children born in 1959 and later, half siblings to Jayne Marie.

In mid-June 1967, Jayne Marie, then 16, claimed that she had been beaten by her mother's 'lawyer and companion' Samuel S. Brody. Her statement to the Los Angeles Police Department the following morning implicated her mother in encouraging the abuse. Days later, a juvenile-court judge awarded temporary custody of Jayne Marie to a great-uncle, W.W. Pigue.

Her mother died two weeks later in a car wreck near New Orleans. The young hired driver was also killed, as was Sam Brody. Three of the younger children were in the backseat and survived with minor injuries.

Jayne Marie was the only one of the children to attend her mother's funeral on July 3, 1967, because her younger half-siblings were all under the age of 10.

In 1968, wrongful death lawsuits for varying amounts were filed related to the death of Jayne Mansfield on behalf of her daughter and of her former husband, Matt Cimber, the producer-director of her last film. They sued the parents of the driver, the business owner of the car that crashed into the back of a truck, and the owner of the car. Their insurers settled the claims involving them. They were dismissed as defendants with no disclosure of amounts.

After a 16-day trial in 1971, the jury found that the driver of the car (who also died) was negligent, and that the driver of the truck (into which Mansfield's car crashed) was not negligent. The driver of a mosquito fog-spraying vehicle was judged negligent for causing the following truck to reduce speed, which Mansfield's driver had not realized, but this was not determined to be a proximate cause of the crash. The judgment was affirmed on appeal.

In 1970, Jayne Marie married Barry Lang in Las Vegas, Nevada. The couple had one son but were later divorced.

In March 1979, she announced her plan to write a biography of her mother. She had not completed a manuscript as of June 2017.

As of 2008, Jayne Marie was in a long-term relationship. She frequently visits her grandchildren.

== Modeling ==
Jayne Marie is the first Playboy nude model whose mother was featured nude as well. Her 7-page pictorial in the magazine's July 1976 issue, titled Jayne's Girl, was photographed by Dwight Hooker. Hooker made the pictorial in a vintage Southern context, including monochromatic images. The accompanying text makes a comparison to her mother and the differences between the two, though Jayne Marie said in an interview that she is "not capitalizing on her bosom as (my) mother did" for the pictorial. In describing her, art historian Anthony W. Lee together with photographer Diane Arbus wrote, "Jayne Marie Mansfield has her mother's rounded features and mysterious eyes."

== Filmography ==
- Olly, Olly, Oxen Free (1978): An independent film directed by Richard A. Colla that featured Katharine Hepburn in the lead. She was uncredited in the cast list.
- Blond in Hollywood (season three): (TV production, 1 episode, February 2003): Third season of a documentary series on Hollywood sex symbols that also featured Matt Cimber and Miklós Hargitay, two of Jayne Mansfield's husbands, as themselves.
- Jayne Mansfield: Loves and Kisses: Featured as an interview in the A&E documentary hosted by Peter Graves aired in 2006.
- My Mom Jayne (2025): Featured as an interview in the HBO Max documentary by her half-sister Mariska Hargitay.

== Sources ==
- Strait, Raymond (July 1992). Here They Are, Jayne Mansfield. New York: S.P.I. Books. ISBN 1-56171-146-2.
