= Daniella Sarahyba =

Brazilian model

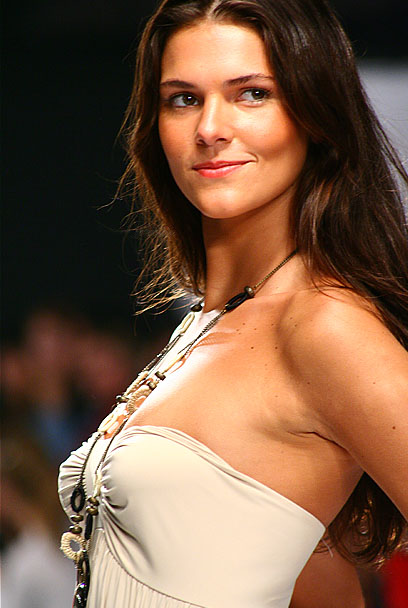
- Sarahyba at the XIII Crystal Fashion, Curitiba
- Born: Daniella Sarahyba Fernandes; 8 July 1984 (age 42); Rio de Janeiro, Brazil
- Spouse: Wolff Klabin (m. 2007)
- Children: 2
- Modeling information
- Height: 5 ft 10 in (1.78 m)
- Hair color: Brown
- Eye color: Hazel

Daniella Sarahyba Fernandes (born 8 July 1984) is a Brazilian model. She appeared in every edition of the Sports Illustrated Swimsuit Issue from 2005 to 2010.

== Early life ==
Sarahyba was born in Rio de Janeiro, Brazil; and her mother, Mara Lúcia Sarahyba, was also a model in Brazil. When she was three days old, she appeared with her mother on the cover of Brazilian parenting magazine Pais & Filhos. Sarahyba began entering modeling contests at age 12.

== Career ==
She worked for the Victoria's Secret brand and posed for the swimsuit edition of the North American magazine Sports Illustrated Swimsuit Issue in 2005, 2006, 2007, 2008, 2009 and 2010.

In addition to her Sports Illustrated shoots, she was the subject of several Joanne Gair body painting projects in these editions.

Sarahyba has worked for GAP, Versace, Olympus, Peugeot, Calzedonia, Maidenform and Michael Stars and is contracted under H&M, Spiegel and Benetton.

== Personal life ==
She married businessman Wolff Klabin (of Klabin paper industries) in 2007. They have two daughters.
