= Lorena Luciano =

Italian and American documentary filmmaker

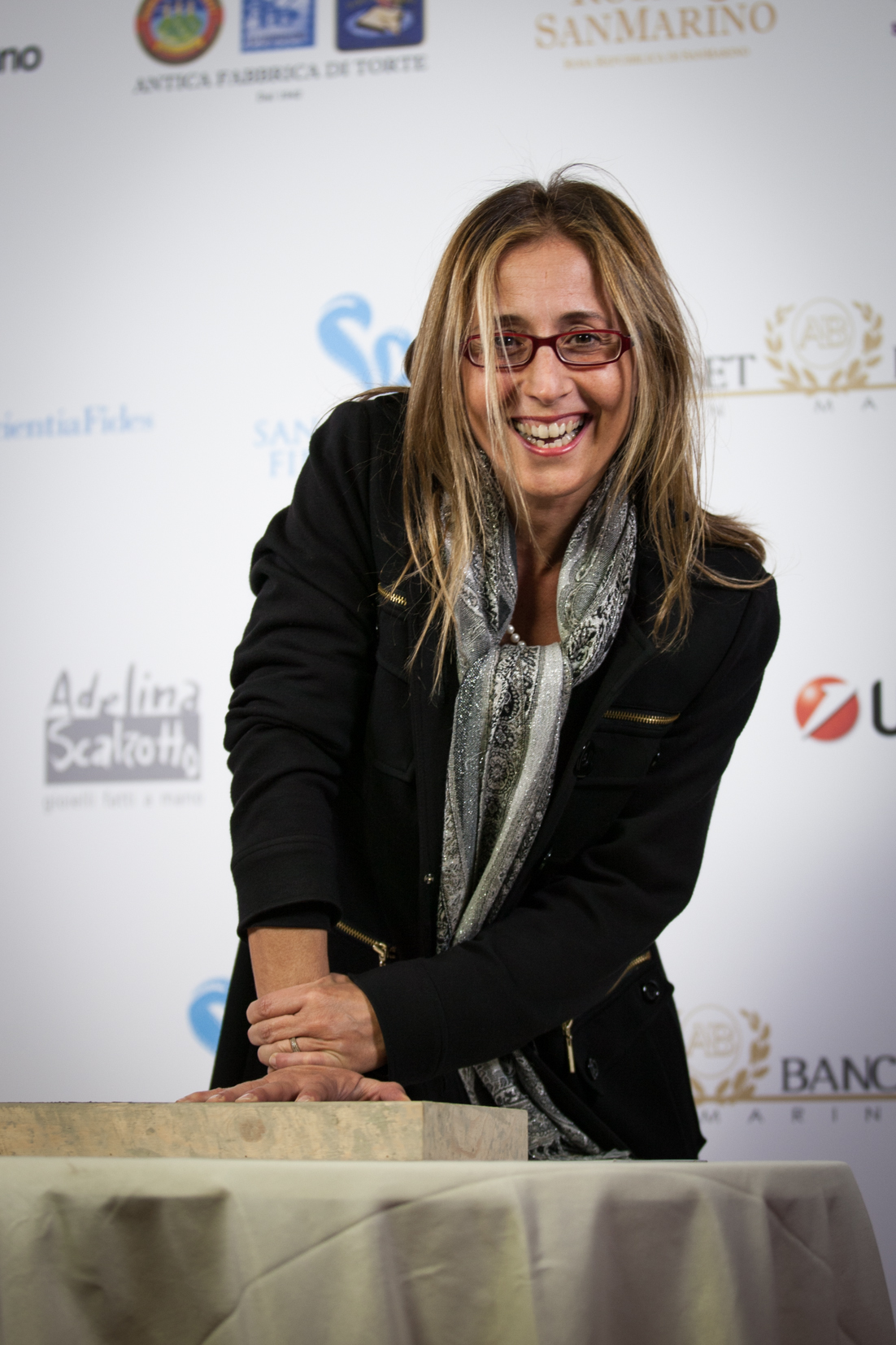
- Born: Milan, Italy
- Occupation: Documentary filmmaker
- Notable work: Dario Fo and Franca Rame: A Nobel for Two (1998); Urbanscapes (2006); Coal Rush (2012); It Will Be Chaos (2018)

Lorena Luciano is an Italian and American documentary filmmaker best known for her documentary film It Will Be Chaos, winner of an Emmy Award for Outstanding Current Affairs documentary in 2019. and winner of Best Directing Award at the Taormina International Film Festival. As a director, editor, and writer she has worked on feature documentaries and TV series for national and international cable TV and streamers. She is the recipient of the Sundance Institute/A&E Brave Storyteller Award, and her work has been recognized with art grants from the MacArthur Foundation, the International Documentary Association (IDA), the New York State Council on the Arts, and the Ben & Jerry's Foundation.

She lives in New York City.

== Early life and education ==
Lorena Luciano was born and raised in Milan, Italy, where she majored in Law at the University of Milan. Luciano never trained as an attorney, and instead moved to New York, where she founded production company Film2 with film partner and future husband Filippo Piscopo. In New York, she pursued a career in filmmaking. She stayed in the United States, eventually gaining dual citizenship.

== Career ==
Luciano's first documentary was Dario Fo and Franca Rame: a Nobel for Two. The film is a portrait of Italian iconoclastic playwright Dario Fo and his lifelong partner and actor Franca Rame. Fo, one of political theater's leading figures, granted Luciano and co-director Filippo Piscopo exclusive access to never-before-seen archival footage of his plays all the way back to 1969.

On October 10, 1997, during the late production stage of Luciano's film, Dario Fo unexpectedly won the Nobel Prize for Literature, as the first theater playwright and actor to earn it in the history of the Swedish Academy. Luciano's film on Dario Fo premiered at the Venice Film Festival and was distributed internationally. It also won the Finalist Award at the Houston Film Festival and was acquired by universities worldwide.

Luciano's second film, Urbanscapes, was released theatrically in New York City in 2006 and received positive reviews from major publications in the US and Europe. Its theatrical screenings were extended by popular demand.

Variety highlighted the "stark, stripped-to-essentials splendor of the film" with scenes that remain in the mind "long after the closing credits".

The New York Times wrote: "Urbanscapes plants a camera in neighborhoods gone to seed, cultivating a bittersweet portrait of American ruin", with "an emphasis sticking on those poetically entropic facades".

Luciano's third film, Coal Rush, captures, over a span of 5 years, a story of water contamination unfolding in the coalfields of West Virginia. The film documents a small forgotten community of coal miners in Mingo County, West Virginia allegedly poisoned by a major coal company, Massey Energy, injecting billions of gallons of coal slurry underground. The film was screened in competition at the 2012 Atlanta Film Festival, selected at the Hot Springs Documentary Film Festival, and bestowed the Social Justice Award by Amy Goodman in 2013 at the Quad Cinema in New York City. Internationally, Coal Rush won the Audience award at the Milan Film Festival (MIFF), the Best Documentary Award at the San Marino Film Festival, the Sustainable Award at Florida's Cinema Verde, and it was presented at Cannes Doc, Fife Ile de France in Paris, Cine Eco Seia in Portugal, and Vatavaran in India. The documentary was picked up for distribution by The Orchard, a film distributor now called 1091. It aired on several streaming platforms, including Amazon Prime Video, Starz, Apple TV, Tubi, and Hulu. The subject of Coal Rush is also the topic of Desperate, a non-fiction book written by The Wall Street Journal reporter Kris Maher in 2021.

Other documentary films documenting the US coal mining communities include Harlan County, USA, Burning the Future: Coal in America, and The Last Mountain.

While presenting Coal Rush at film festivals, Luciano worked on the feature-length documentary It Will Be Chaos (formerly known as In the Middle), focusing on the European refugee crisis. The documentary was awarded grants from the MacArthur Foundation, multiple grants from Chicken and Egg Pictures, the Ben & Jerry's Foundation, an artist grant from NYSCA, and it was selected for the IFP Market and the IDFA Forum.

In 2019, It Will Be Chaos won an Emmy Award for Outstanding Current Affairs documentary at the 40th News & Documentary Emmy Awards.

It Will Be Chaos also won the Best Directing Award at the 2018 Taormina International Film Festival and the Humanitarian Award at the Socially Relevant Film Festival New York. It has been shortlisted for the 2019 David di Donatello Awards and screened, beyond dozen of film festivals, at venues such as the European Parliament, a refugee compound in Yemen, the World Bank in DC, the National Film Institute in Barcelona, Spain, and it was programmed at the National Gallery in Washington, DC.

Luciano is a frequent film festival juror and international speaker, and serves as a National Emmy Judge.

In 2025, Luciano directed Nuns vs. The Vatican which had its world premiere at the 2025 Toronto International Film Festival, focusing on the Me Too movement within the Roman Catholic Church, supported by Sundance Institute and International Documentary Association, with Mariska Hargitay serving as an executive producer.

== Style ==
For her documentaries, Lorena Luciano adopts a cinéma vérité style, avoiding voice-over narration, that mixes observational footage, on-camera interviews, stylized footage, and archive.

== Personal life ==
Luciano lives in Brooklyn with her husband Filippo Piscopo and their two sons. She divides her work between projects for hire and independent feature films.

== Filmography ==
- Dario Fo and Franca Rame: A Nobel for Two (1998)
- Urbanscapes (2006)
- Coal Rush (2012)
- It Will Be Chaos (2018)
- Nuns vs. The Vatican (2025)

== Awards and nominations ==
- 1998 Venice Film Festival selection
- 2013 Audience Award, MFF (Milan Film Festival)
- 2013 Best Documentary Award, San Marino Film Festival
- 2014 Social Justice Award by Amy Goodman
- 2018 Best Directing Award, Taormina International Film Festival
- 2019 Emmy Award for Outstanding Current Affairs documentary

== See also ==
- Filippo Piscopo
