= Sardelli =

Sardelli is a surname. Notable people with the surname include:

- Federico Maria Sardelli (born 1963), Italian conductor
- Gastón Sardelli (born 1984), Argentine musician, member of Airbag (band)
- Guido Sardelli (born 1988), Argentine musician, member of Airbag (band)
- Nelson Sardelli (born 1934), Brazilian singer-comedian
- Patricio Sardelli (born 1986), Argentine musician, member of Airbag (band)
