= 37th Producers Guild of America Awards =

37th Annual Producers Guild Awards
- Date: February 28, 2026
- Location: Fairmont Century Plaza, Los Angeles, California
- Country: United States
- Presented by: Producers Guild of America

Highlights
- Best Producer(s) Motion Picture: One Battle After Another – Adam Somner, Sara Murphy, and Paul Thomas Anderson
- Best Producer(s) Animated Feature: KPop Demon Hunters – Michelle Wong
- Best Producer(s) Documentary Motion Picture: My Mom Jayne – Mariska Hargitay and Trish Adlesic

The 37th Producers Guild of America Awards (also known as 2026 Producers Guild Awards or 2026 PGA Awards), honoring the best film and television producers of 2025, were held at the Fairmont Century Plaza in Los Angeles, California on February 28, 2026. The nominees in the documentary category were announced on December 9, 2025, the nominations in the sports, children's, and short-form categories were announced on December 12, 2025, and the remaining nominations for film and television were announced on January 9, 2026. The finalists for the PGA Innovation Award were announced on December 9, 2025.

The PGA Innovation Award was presented on February 26, 2026, at a reception in Los Angeles.

== Winners and nominees ==
=== Film ===
Darryl F. Zanuck Award for Outstanding Producer of Theatrical Motion Pictures
- One Battle After Another – Adam Somner, Sara Murphy, and Paul Thomas Anderson
  - Bugonia – Ed Guiney, Andrew Lowe, Yorgos Lanthimos, Emma Stone, and Lars Knudsen
  - F1 – Jerry Bruckheimer, Joseph Kosinski, Brad Pitt, Dede Gardner, Jeremy Kleiner, and Chad Oman
  - Frankenstein – Guillermo del Toro, J. Miles Dale, and Scott Stuber
  - Hamnet – Liza Marshall, Pippa Harris, Sam Mendes, Steven Spielberg, and Nicolas Gonda
  - Marty Supreme – Eli Bush, Ronald Bronstein, Josh Safdie, Anthony Katagas, and Timothée Chalamet
  - Sentimental Value – Maria Ekerhovd and Andrea Berentsen Ottmar
  - Sinners – Ryan Coogler, Zinzi Coogler, and Sev Ohanian
  - Train Dreams – Marissa McMahon, Teddy Schwarzman, Will Janowitz, Ashley Schlaifer, and Michael Heimler
  - Weapons – Zach Cregger and Miri Yoon
Outstanding Producer of Documentary Theatrical Motion Pictures
- My Mom Jayne – Mariska Hargitay and Trish Adlesic
  - The Alabama Solution – Andrew Jarecki, Charlotte Kaufman, Alelur "Alex" Duran and Beth Shelburne
  - Cover-Up – Laura Poitras, Mark Obenhaus, Yoni Golijov and Olivia Streisand
  - Mr Nobody Against Putin – Helle Faber, Alžběta Karásková and Radovan Síbrt
  - Ocean with David Attenborough – Toby Nowlan and Keith Scholey
  - The Perfect Neighbor – Alisa Payne, Geeta Gandbhir, Nikon Kwantu and Sam Bisbee
  - The Tale of Silyan – Jean Dakar, Anna Hashmi, Tamara Kotevska and Jordanco Petkovski
Outstanding Producer of Animated Theatrical Motion Pictures
- KPop Demon Hunters – Michelle Wong
  - The Bad Guys 2 – Damon Ross
  - Demon Slayer: Kimetsu no Yaiba – The Movie: Infinity Castle – Akifumi Fujio, Masanori Miyake and Yūma Takahashi
  - Elio – Mary Alice Drumm
  - Zootopia 2 – Yvett Merino

=== Television ===
Norman Felton Award for Outstanding Producer of Episodic Television, Drama
- The Pitt (HBO Max)
  - Andor (Disney+)
  - The Diplomat (Netflix)
  - Pluribus (Apple TV)
  - Severance (Apple TV)
  - The White Lotus (HBO Max)
Danny Thomas Award for Outstanding Producer of Episodic Television, Comedy
- The Studio (Apple TV)
  - The Bear (FX / Hulu)
  - Hacks (HBO Max)
  - Only Murders in the Building (Hulu)
  - South Park (Comedy Central / Paramount+)
David L. Wolper Award for Outstanding Producer of Limited or Anthology Series Television
- Adolescence (Netflix)
  - The Beast in Me (Netflix)
  - Black Mirror (Netflix)
  - Black Rabbit (Netflix)
  - Dying for Sex (FX on Hulu)
Outstanding Producer of Streamed or Televised Motion Pictures
- John Candy: I Like Me (Prime Video)
  - Bridget Jones: Mad About the Boy (Peacock)
  - The Gorge (Apple TV)
  - Nonnas (Netflix)
  - Mountainhead (HBO)
Outstanding Producer of Non-Fiction Television
- Pee-wee as Himself (HBO)
  - aka Charlie Sheen (Netflix)
  - Billy Joel: And So It Goes (HBO)
  - Mr. Scorsese (Apple TV)
  - SNL50: Beyond Saturday Night (Peacock)
Outstanding Producer of Game & Competition Television
- The Traitors (Peacock)
  - The Amazing Race (CBS)
  - Jeopardy! (ABC)
  - RuPaul's Drag Race (MTV)
  - Top Chef (Bravo)
Outstanding Producer of Live Entertainment, Variety, Sketch, Standup & Talk Television
- The Late Show with Stephen Colbert (CBS)
  - The Daily Show (Comedy Central)
  - Jimmy Kimmel Live! (ABC)
  - Last Week Tonight with John Oliver (HBO)
  - SNL50: The Anniversary Special (NBC)
Outstanding Sports Program
- Formula 1: Drive to Survive (Netflix)
  - 100 Foot Wave (HBO)
  - Big Dreams: The Little League World Series 2024 (ESPN)
  - Hard Knocks: Training Camp with the Buffalo Bills (HBO)
  - Surf Girls: International (Prime Video)
Outstanding Children's Program
- Sesame Street (HBO Max / Netflix)
  - LEGO Star Wars: Rebuild the Galaxy: Pieces of the Past (Disney+)
  - Phineas and Ferb (Disney Channel / Disney+)
  - Snoopy Presents: A Summer Musical (Apple TV)
  - SpongeBob SquarePants (Nickelodeon)
Outstanding Short-Form Program
- Adolescence: The Making of Adolescence (Netflix)
  - The Daily Show: Desi Lydic Foxsplains (YouTube)
  - Hacks: Bit By Bit (HBO Max)
  - Overtime with Bill Maher (HBO)
  - The White Lotus: Unpacking the Episode (HBO)

=== PGA Innovation Award ===
PGA Innovation Award
- The Wizard of Oz at Sphere (Sphere Entertainment)
  - Asteroid (30 Ninjas / 100 Zeros)
  - Big Wave: No Room for Error (Cosm)
  - D-Day: The Camera Soldier (Targo / Time Studios)
  - Territory (Double Eye Studios / Kinetic Light)

=== David O. Selznick Achievement Award in Theatrical Motion Pictures ===
- Amy Pascal

=== Milestone Award ===
- Jason Blum

=== Norman Lear Achievement Award in Television ===
- Mara Brock Akil
