= Mariska Hargitay =

American actress (born 1964)

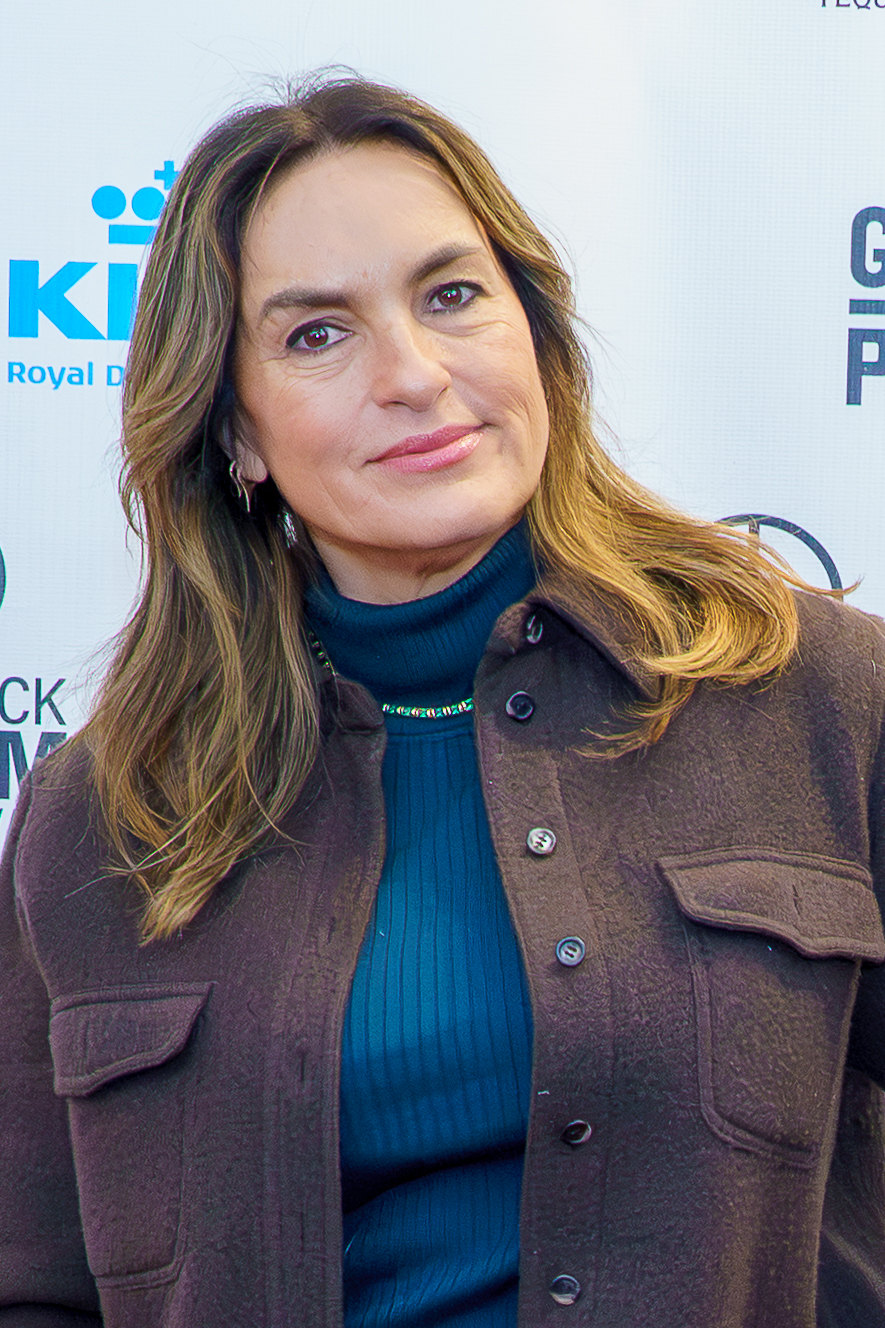
- Hargitay in 2025
- Born: Mariska Magdolna Hargitay; January 23, 1964 (age 62); Santa Monica, California, U.S.
- Occupations: Actress; producer
- Years active: 1984–present
- Spouse: Peter Hermann (m. 2004)
- Children: 3
- Parents: Jayne Mansfield (mother); Mickey Hargitay (father); Nelson Sardelli (biological father)
- Relatives: Jayne Marie Mansfield (half-sister)
- Awards: Full list

Mariska Magdolna Hargitay (Note: /məˈrɪʃkə ˈhɑːrɡɪteɪ/; Hungarian: [ˈmɒrɪʃkɒ ˈhɒrɡɪtɒɪ]) (born January 23, 1964) is an American actress. She is best known for playing Olivia Benson on NBC's Law & Order: Special Victims Unit since 1999, the longest-running character of all time in an American primetime drama. Her accolades include three Primetime Emmy Awards and a Golden Globe Award.

After attending Marymount High School in Los Angeles, she enrolled in the UCLA School of Theater, Film and Television, leaving before completing her degree to pursue acting. Her credits outside Law & Order: Special Victims Unit include the series Falcon Crest and In the Heat of the Night (both 1988), Tequila and Bonetti (1992), Can't Hurry Love (1995–1996), and ER (1997–1998). In 2013, she received a star on the Hollywood Walk of Fame.

Outside acting, Hargitay co-produced the HBO documentary I Am Evidence (2017), winning a News and Documentary Emmy for the project. She launched the production company Mighty Entertainment in 2025, under which she directed the documentary My Mom Jayne (2025). She founded the Joyful Heart Foundation, which provides support to people who have been sexually abused. She is a certified rape counselor and has engaged in initiatives to support domestic violence shelters and raise awareness about untested rape kits.

== Early life ==
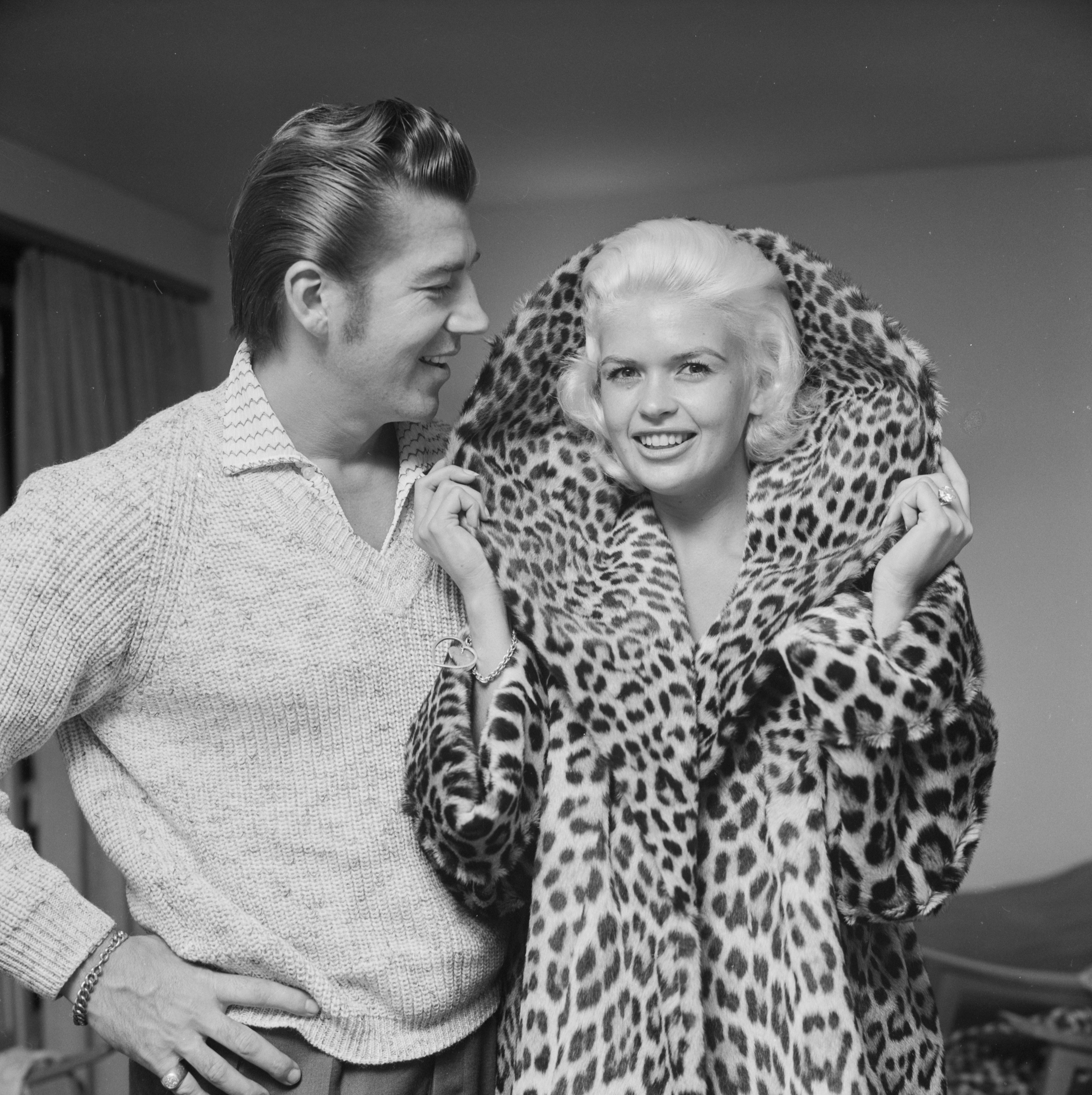
Jayne Mansfield with husband Mickey Hargitay

Mariska Magdolna Hargitay was born at Providence Saint John's Health Center in Santa Monica, California, to actress Jayne Mansfield and husband Mickey Hargitay. She was conceived and was born during Mansfield's marriage to Mickey Hargitay and grew up believing he was her biological father. Hargitay did not learn of her true paternity until she was in her twenties; her biological father is Nelson Sardelli, Brazilian-born singer, actor, and comedian of Italian descent. Her first and middle names are Hungarian and translate to Mary Magdalene (Mariska is a Hungarian diminutive of Mary, meaning "Little Mary"). Hargitay was named after her grandmother Mary. She was referred to as "Maria" after her mother's marriage to Matt Cimber, who was Italian-American. She was raised Catholic. Mansfield had four other children, including Jayne Marie Mansfield. Through Sardelli, Hargitay also has three half-sisters.

On June 29, 1967, Hargitay, two of her brothers, Mansfield, Sam Brody (Mansfield's then-boyfriend), and driver Ronald Harrison were in an automobile crash on a stretch of U.S. Route 90 between New Orleans and Bay St. Louis, Mississippi. The accident ripped off the top of the car, instantly killing Mansfield, Brody, and Harrison. Asleep in the back of the vehicle, three-and-a-half-year-old Hargitay and her brothers escaped with minor injuries. The accident left Hargitay with a zig-zag scar on her head.

After Mansfield's death, Hargitay and her brothers were raised by Mickey Hargitay and his third wife, Ellen Siano. Hargitay has said that the early loss of her mother left "a hole in my life that won't ever be filled. I will never get over it. I will always be a girl who lost her mom."

Hargitay began attending the University of California, Los Angeles (UCLA) in 1982 as a theater arts major. That same year, Hargitay was crowned Miss Beverly Hills USA. By the time she was a freshman in college, Hargitay had an agent and several small roles to her credit. She attended UCLA School of Theater Film and Television where she was a member of Kappa Kappa Gamma. She left college before completing her degree.

Hargitay attended Groundlings Theatre and School in Los Angeles.

== Career ==
=== Early work and roles ===
After Hargitay was crowned Miss Beverly Hills USA in 1982, she competed in the Miss California USA pageant in 1983. She was the fourth runner-up. In 1984, Hargitay appeared in Ronnie Milsap's music video for "She Loves My Car", the first country music video to appear on MTV. A year later, she had a small role in the horror film Ghoulies.

Hargitay briefly replaced Gabrielle Fitzpatrick as Dulcea in Mighty Morphin Power Rangers: The Movie, although her scenes were cut from the film when Fitzpatrick recovered from her surgery and returned to the film. In 1988, she had a recurring role as Carly Fixx in the soap opera Falcon Crest. Hargitay played Jill Banner in the Japanese-American co-production Strawberry Road in 1991. She portrayed police officer Angela Garcia in the 1992 series Tequila and Bonetti. Hargitay appeared in the two-part fourth season finale of Seinfeld, where her character read for the role of Elaine Benes in "The Pilot". (She had been considered for the character of Elaine Benes on Seinfeld itself before the show began.) Two years later, Hargitay portrayed Didi Edelstein in the 1995 sitcom Can't Hurry Love. In 1997, Hargitay played detective Nina Echeverria on the drama series Prince Street; she also had a recurring role as inept desk clerk Cynthia Hooper during the fourth season of ER.

Hargitay said in 1986 that she had never thought about acting on television until a role on the one-hour adventure drama series Downtown was offered to her. In fact, she experienced difficulties in her efforts to begin a career as a Hollywood actor and endured frequent comparisons to her mother.

=== Law & Order: Special Victims Unit ===
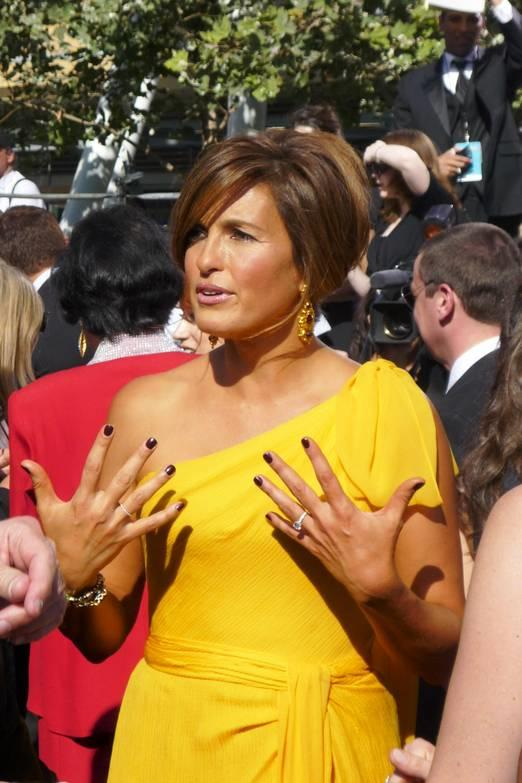
Hargitay attending the 60th Primetime Emmy Awards in 2008

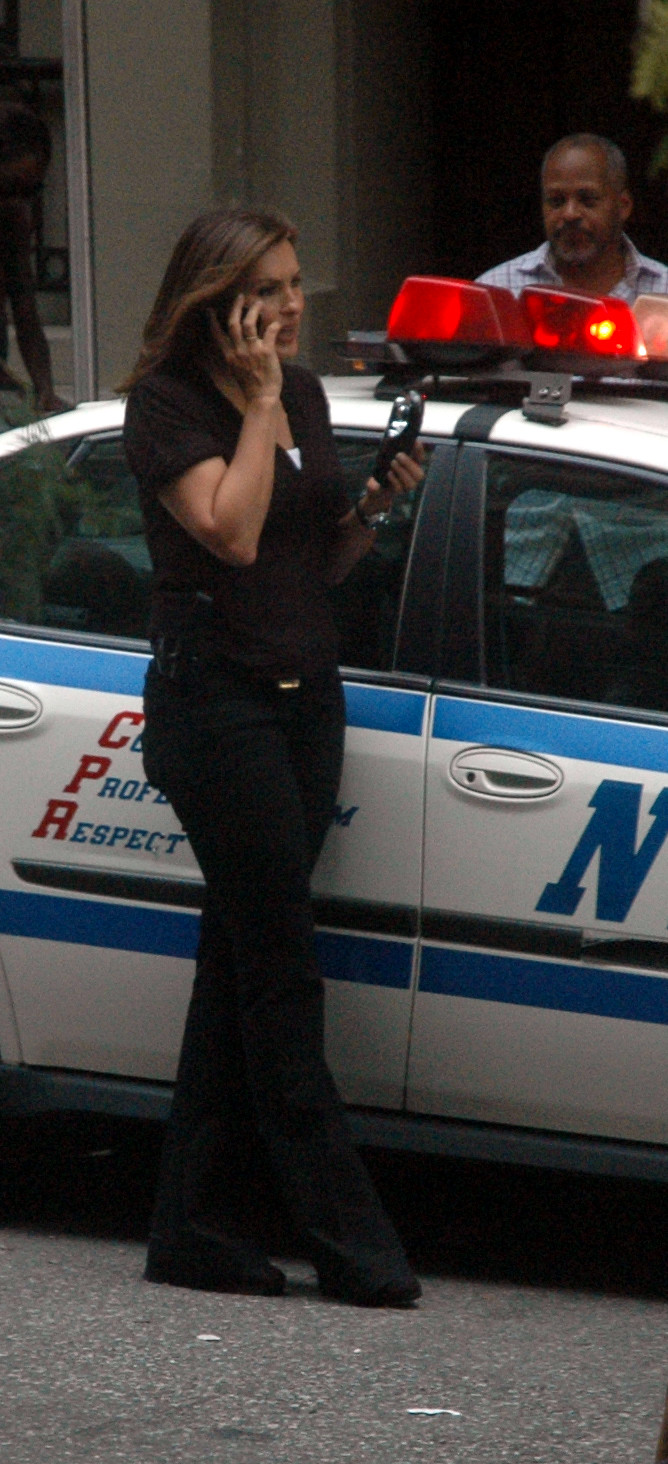
Hargitay takes a phone call before live shooting of Season 12 of Law & Order: Special Victims Unit in August 2010.

Hargitay is best known for her portrayal of Olivia Benson on Law & Order: SVU. Benson is the longest-running character on the longest-running American primetime drama in history.

Casting for the lead characters of NBC police procedural television drama series Law & Order: Special Victims Unit occurred in the spring of 1999. Dick Wolf, along with officials from NBC and Studios USA, was at the final auditions for the two leads at Rockefeller Center. There were six finalists. For the female lead (Detective Olivia Benson), Samantha Mathis, Reiko Aylesworth, and Hargitay were being considered. For the male lead (Detective Elliot Stabler), the finalists were Tim Matheson, John Slattery, and Christopher Meloni. Meloni and Hargitay had auditioned in the final round together. After the actors left, there was a moment of dead silence, after which Wolf blurted out, "Oh well. There's no doubt who we should choose – Hargitay and Meloni." The duo, who Wolf believed had the perfect chemistry from the first time he saw them together, were his first choice. Garth Ancier, then head of NBC Entertainment, agreed, and the rest of the panel assembled voiced their assent.

Hargitay trained as a rape crisis advocate to prepare for the role of Benson. She has portrayed Benson since 1999. Hargitay has won an Emmy and a Golden Globe for her portrayal of Benson. She received UCLA's TFT Distinguished Alumni Award in 2011 and was honored at the school's June commencement ceremony.

During the last months of her pregnancy in 2006, Hargitay took maternity leave from SVU. She was temporarily replaced by Connie Nielsen, who portrayed Stabler's temporary partner Dani Beck.

In late December 2008, Hargitay suffered a partially collapsed lung after taking a fall during a stunt on the set of SVU. She underwent surgery in January and returned to work shortly afterward.

In May 2009, after the show's tenth season, Hargitay and Meloni's contracts expired when they were reportedly making $375,000–$385,000 per episode. During negotiations in April for a new contract, the duo attempted to receive a percentage of the show's profits as other high-profile Law and Order actors had done in the past. It was rumored that NBC threatened to replace Hargitay and Meloni if they persisted in their demands. Eventually, their contracts were renewed for two more years.

As of August 2012, Hargitay was earning approximately $400,000–$500,000 per episode of Law & Order: Special Victims Unit. In 2013, Hargitay was awarded the 2,511th star of the Hollywood Walk of Fame. Her star was placed next to the star of her mother, which is located at 6328 Hollywood Boulevard. In 2013 and 2014, she was ranked by Forbes as the second-highest-paid television actress, after only Sofía Vergara of Modern Family. In the following years, Hargitay continued to be one of the highest-paid television actresses in the world, making well over $500,000 per episode.

In July 2021, Hargitay suffered a broken ankle after taking a fall in the rain while leaving the screening of Black Widow. Her injury caused minor script changes and was written into the season 23 premiere of SVU. In 2025, Forbes named Hargitay as the 11th highest-paid actor of 2024, the second highest-paid actress of 2024 (after Nicole Kidman), and the highest-paid actor on television by a wide margin; she earned an estimated $750,000 per episode between acting, producing, and syndication profits from SVU.

=== Producing and Broadway ===
In January 2007, Hargitay and her older son appeared in a Got Milk? advertisement. At the 2015 MTV Video Music Awards, Hargitay won the "Video of the Year" Award, shared with Taylor Swift and all of the celebrities that appeared in the music video for Swift's song "Bad Blood".

Hargitay has produced a documentary, I Am Evidence. Released by HBO in 2018, the documentary discusses the thousands of untested rape kits in the United States. Hargitay called the reality of untested rape kits "the clearest and most shocking demonstration of how we regard these crimes in our country." The film received Best Documentary at the 40th News and Documentary Emmy Awards, winning Hargitay her second Emmy and first as a producer.

In 2025, Hargitay announced the launch of Mighty Entertainment, a production company. Hargitay's feature film directorial debut, My Mom Jayne, was released in the United States by Mighty Entertainment in June 2025. The documentary film delved into the life and death of her mother, Jayne Mansfield. That same year, she served as an executive producer on Nuns vs. The Vatican, directed by Lorena Luciano. In 2026, it was announced that Hargitay would make her Broadway debut playing the central character in Every Brilliant Thing, replacing Daniel Radcliffe.

== Activism ==
Hargitay is a certified rape counselor, as reported in 2004. As a rape survivor, she has called for an end to the stigma surrounding sexual assault. In a 2024 essay for People, she wrote, "Tell someone you've survived cancer, and you're celebrated. I want the same response for sexual assault survivors. I want no shame with the victim."

On September 27, 2011, Hargitay donated $100,000 to her alma mater, the UCLA School of Theater Film and Television for scholarship. In 2012, Hargitay campaigned for the reauthorization of the Violence Against Women Act (VAWA). In 2025, Hargitay was included on the inaugural Time 100 Philanthropy list for her work.

=== Joyful Heart Foundation ===
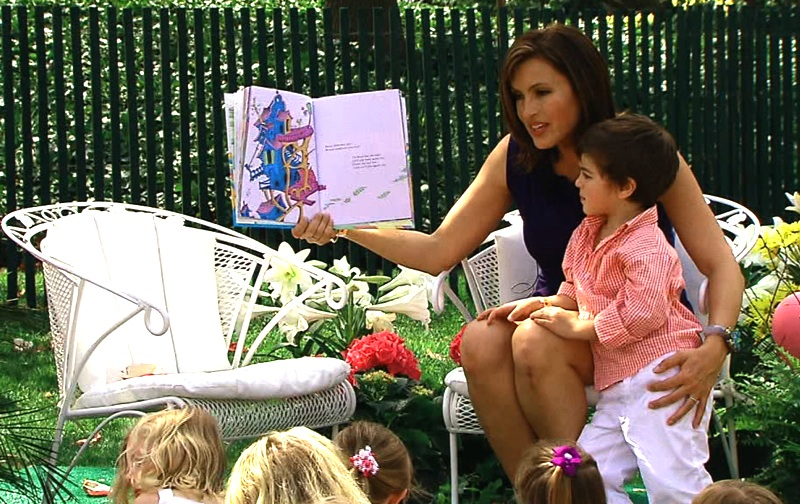
Hargitay reading Oh! The Places You'll Go! by Dr. Seuss at the 2010 White House Easter Egg Roll

Hargitay is the founder and former president of the Joyful Heart Foundation, an organization established in 2004 to provide support to survivors of sexual assault, domestic violence, child abuse, elder abuse and human trafficking.

In November 2009, Hargitay and the Joyful Heart Foundation built healing and wellness kits for women who suffered domestic violence and were living in the Los Angeles County's domestic violence shelters. They created enough kits to give one to each of about 600 women. In California, the domestic violence services budget was in a major crisis, and shelters were forced to turn women away. Hargitay and her foundation donated money to the cause.

As of November 2010, the Joyful Heart Foundation had sent over 5,000 women and children on therapeutic programs in New York, Los Angeles, and Hawaii, which combine yoga, meditation, massage, journaling, and swimming with dolphins. According to Hargitay, the Foundation had raised $20 million as of April 2011. Reference to the Joyful Heart Foundation was worked into episodes of Special Victims Unit, via a necklace containing two pendants representing the Foundation that Hargitay's character began wearing in the show's 13th season. The Foundation works with several brands to create products supporting the cause, including Me&Ro, Michael Stars, and AZIAM's Wife Lover Tanks.

== Personal life ==
Hargitay speaks five languages: English, French, Hungarian, Spanish, and Italian. In a 2010 interview with Good Housekeeping, Hargitay stated that she considers herself a Christian. Hargitay is a fan of the New York Knicks and is regularly seen courtside; Knicks point guard Jalen Brunson has said she is his favorite celebrity to see at games.

In December 2008, Hargitay suffered a partially collapsed lung after falling on the set of SVU. She underwent surgery in January 2009 and was hospitalized on March 3, 2009 after suffering from chest pains related to the injury. In 2024, Hargitay publicly disclosed that she is a rape survivor.

=== Family ===
Hargitay did not know her true paternity until she was in her twenties, when she was shown a picture of her biological father, Nelson Sardelli. She confronted her legal father, Mickey Hargitay, who reacted with anger, and she never mentioned Sardelli to him again. After Mickey Hargitay's death, she eventually met Sardelli at one of his performances in Atlantic City, New Jersey. She gradually formed a relationship with Sardelli althought she remained committed to Mickey Hargitay, legally her father who brought her up. She did not publicly reveal her true paternity until 2025.

On August 28, 2004, in Santa Barbara, California, Hargitay married Peter Hermann, an actor she met on the set of Law & Order: SVU. Hermann plays the recurring role of defense attorney Trevor Langan on Law & Order: SVU.

On June 28, 2006, Hargitay gave birth to a son by an emergency caesarean section. In April 2011, Hargitay and her husband adopted a baby girl. In October 2011, they adopted a son.

== Filmography ==
=== Film ===
Year	Title	Role	Notes
1985	Ghoulies	Donna	
1986	Welcome to 18	Joey	
1987	Jocks	Nicole	
1988	Mr. Universe	Herself	
1991	Hard Time Romance	Anita	
1991	The Perfect Weapon	Jennifer	
1991	Strawberry Road	Jill Banner	
1993	Bank Robber	Marisa Benoit	
1995	Leaving Las Vegas	Hooker at Bar	
1999	Lake Placid	Myra Okubo	
2001	Perfume	Darcy	Credited as Marishka Hargitay
2006	Tales from Earthsea	Tenar	Voice role
2008	The Love Guru	Herself	Cameo
2017	I Am Evidence	Herself	Producer of documentary
2025	My Mom Jayne	Herself	Director of documentary
2025	Nuns vs. The Vatican	—N/a	Executive producer

=== Television ===
Year	Title	Role	Notes
1966	The Merv Griffin Show	Herself	Guest
1986	Downtown	Jesse Smith	Main role
1987–1988	Falcon Crest	Carly Fixx	Recurring role
1988	In the Heat of the Night	Audine Higgs	Episode: "...And Then You Die"
1988	Freddy's Nightmares	Marsha Wildmon	Episode: "Freddy's Tricks and Treats"
1989	Finish Line	Lisa Karsh	TV movie
1989	Baywatch	Lisa Peters	Episode: "Second Wave"
1990	Wiseguy	Debbie Vitale	Episode: "Romp"
1990	thirtysomething	Courtney Dunn	Episode: "Fathers and Lovers"
1990	Booker	Michelle Larkina	Episode: "Black Diamond Run"
1990	Gabriel's Fire	Carmen	Episode: "Windows"
1991	Adam-12	Michelle Brown	Episode: "Anatomy of a Rape"
1992	Tequila and Bonetti	Officer Angela Garcia	Main role
1992	Grapevine	Katie	Episode: "The Katie and Adam Story"
1993	Hotel Room	Diane	Episodes: "Getting Rid of Robert" & "Blackout"
1993	Blind Side	Melanie	TV movie
1993	Key West	Laurel	Episode: "Less Moonlight"
1993	Seinfeld	Melissa Shannon	Episode: "The Pilot"
1994	Gambler V: Playing for Keeps	Etta Place	TV movie
1995	All-American Girl	Jane	Episode: "Young Americans"
1995–1996	Can't Hurry Love	Didi Edelstein	Main role
1996	Ellen	Dara	Episode: "The Mugging"
1996	The Lazarus Man	The Angel Maker	Episode: "1.15"
1996	The Single Guy	Kate Conklin / Mounted Cop	3 episodes
1997	Night Sins	Paige Price	TV movie
1997	Prince Street	Nina Echeverria	Recurring role; 6 episodes
1997	Cracker	Penny Hatfield	Episode: "True Romance 1"
1997	The Advocate's Devil	Rendi	TV movie
1997–1998	ER	Cynthia Hooper	Recurring role
1999	Love, American Style	Wendy	Segment: "Love and the Blind Date"
1999–present	Law & Order: Special Victims Unit	Olivia Benson	Main role; producer & director
2000–2026	Law & Order	Olivia Benson	Recurring role
2004	Plain Truth	Ellie Harrison	TV movie
2005	Law & Order: Trial by Jury	Olivia Benson	Episode: "Day"
2010	Kathy Griffin: My Life on the D-List	Herself	Episode: "Kathy with a Z"
2011	Barefoot Contessa	Herself	Episode: "Sweet Charity"
2014–2016	Chicago P.D.	Olivia Benson	3 Episodes (Note: "They'll Have to Go Through Me", "The Number of Rats" & "The Song of Gregory Williams Yates")
2015	Chicago Fire	Olivia Benson	Episode: "We Called Her Jellybean"
2015	The Jim Gaffigan Show	Herself	Episode: "Maria"
2017	Nightcap	Herself	Episode: "Guest in a Snake"
2019	Saturday Night Live	Olivia Benson	Cameo
2021–2025	Law & Order: Organized Crime	Olivia Benson	Recurring role, 14 episodes
2022	Gutsy	Herself	Episode 3
2026	78th Primetime Emmy Awards	Herself (host)	Television special

=== Video games ===
Year	Title	Role	Notes
2005	True Crime: New York City	Lt. Deena Dixon	

=== Music videos ===
Year	Title	Artist	Notes
1984	"She Loves My Car"	Ronnie Milsap	
2015	"Bad Blood"	Taylor Swift feat. Kendrick Lamar	Justice
2021	"93 Days"	Grace Gaustad	Dr. Har
2022	"Disappear"	Grace Gaustad	
2022	"The Cloud"	Grace Gaustad	

== Awards and nominations ==
She has received several awards including three Primetime Emmy Awards, a News and Documentary Emmy Award, a Golden Globe Award, two People Choice Awards, and an MTV Video Music Award.
