= The Tale of Silyan =

2025 documentary film

- American theatrical release poster
- Macedonian: Приказната за Силјан
- Directed by: Tamara Kotevska
- Written by: Suz Curtis; Tamara Kotevska
- Produced by: Jean Dakar; Anna Hashmi; Tamara Kotevska; Jordanco Petkovski
- Starring: Nikola Conev; Aleksandar Conev; Aleksandra Coneva; Ilina Coneva; Jana Coneva
- Cinematography: Jean Dakar
- Edited by: Martin Ivanov
- Music by: Joe Wilson Davies; Hun OukPark
- Production companies: Concordia Studio; The Corner Shop; Ciconia Film
- Distributed by: National Geographic Documentary Films; Picturehouse (United States)
- Release dates: August 29, 2025 (Venice); September 22, 2025 (North Macedonia); November 28, 2025 (United States); December 12, 2025 (UK)
- Running time: 80 minutes
- Country: North Macedonia
- Language: Macedonian
- Box office: $30,296

The Tale of Silyan (Macedonian: Приказната за Силјан) is a 2025 Macedonian documentary film produced, written and directed by Tamara Kotevska. It follows Macedonian farmer Nikola Conev and his family in the backdrop of the country's economic instability. While Conev forms a bond with an injured white stork, his daughter, son-in-law, grandchildren, and wife move to Germany in search of better life.

The film had its world premiere out of competition at the 82nd Venice International Film Festival on August 29, 2025, it was theatrically released in North Macedonia on September 22, and in the United States on November 28 by Picturehouse.

It was selected as the Macedonian entry for the Best International Feature Film at the 98th Academy Awards, but it was not nominated.

== Summary ==
Somewhere in North Macedonia, Nikola and Jana Conev are a poor farmer couple who grow potatoes, cabbage, tomatoes, and tobacco. The white storks in the area form a symbiotic relationship with the farmers as the fertile land offers prey for the birds, which construct their nests on the village rooftops. The country, one of the few in the continent which is not a part of the European Union, faces looming economical instability. This causes markets to shrink and prices for crops to hit an all-time low, depriving the Conevs and their fellow farmers of income as they are unable to sell their products. Protesting against the government's policies, the farmers block city roads with their rotten crops. While many of the villagers move away in search of a better life, Nikola refuses to leave the land he inherited from his family, and is still shaken by his eldest son's departure a few years ago.

Nikola's daughter Ana decides to immigrate to Germany along with her husband and their children. Caught off-guard by the high cost of living, Ana begs for her mother's help. Jana also moves to Germany, leaving Nikola behind. Nikola puts up all of his family's land for sale, but no one is interested in buying. Spring arrives, and the storks return to the village to reproduce. With many of the farmers and villagers having moved away, the storks have begun scavenging through garbage at the landfill. Needing income, Nikola takes a job as a bulldozer driver at the landfill. One day, Nikola comes across an injured white stork, who he names Silyan after the character from a local folk tale. He saves the bird and forms an unexpected bond. Nikola's financial difficulties continue as he and other remaining farmers resort to burning some of the crops to receive insurance payouts. Nikola and his friend also resort to searching abandoned homes with a metal detector in the hope of finding hidden gold. Desperate, Nikola contemplates leaving Macedonia. Silyan begins to recover, and as he does, so does Nikola's resolve. Rather than abandon his home, he resolves to plough his land once again and remain self-sufficient. Jana eventually reunites with Nikola, and Silyan finds a mate.

Throughout the film, the narrator tells of the Macedonian folk tale of Silyan, a boy whose own father curses him for wanting to leave the village. A bolt of lightning strikes Silyan, transforming him into a white stork. Unaware of what has happened to Silyan, the cursed child joins the other white storks to survive, even migrating with them. When spring comes, the storks fly back home and Silyan is taken in by his heartbroken father, who does not know that the bird is his long-lost child.

== Participants ==
- Nikola Conev
- Jana Coneva
- Aleksandar Conev
- Aleksandra Coneva
- Ilina Coneva
- Stojco Filipov
- Ile Stojkovski

== Production ==
Concordia Studio financed the film, with Davis Guggenheim and Laurene Powell Jobs among the executive producers.

== Release ==
The Tale of Silyan had its world premiere at the 82nd Venice International Film Festival on August 29, 2025. The film was announced as Best Film in the Cinema and Arts Award competition. It was also screened at the 2025 Toronto International Film Festival on September 10, 2025.

In September 2025, the film was selected as the Macedonian entry for the Best International Feature Film at the 98th Academy Awards. The film premiered in North Macedonia on September 22, 2025.

In September 2025, National Geographic Documentary Films acquired worldwide distribution rights to the documentary, planning to release it theatrically and then on Disney+ following a festival run. The trailer and official poster for the film were released on October 30, 2025. In October 2025, Picturehouse was announced as the film's North American theatrical distributor, with Dogwoof distributing internationally. The film was theatrically released in the United States on November 28, 2025. It was broadcast on National Geographic on January 8, 2026, and was available on Disney+ and Hulu on January 9, 2026.

== Reception ==
On the review aggregator website Rotten Tomatoes, the film has a 97% rating based on 39 reviews.

=== Accolades ===
Award / Film Festival	Date of ceremony	Category	Recipient(s)	Result	Ref.
IDA Documentary Awards	December 6, 2025	Best Feature Documentary	Jean Dakar, Anna Hashmi, Tamara Kotevska, and Jordanco Petkovski	Won	
IDA Documentary Awards	December 6, 2025	Best Cinematography	Jean Dakar	Won	
Primetime Emmy Awards	September 5, 2026	Exceptional Merit in Documentary Filmmaking	Tamara Kotevska, Jean Dakar, Anna Hashmi, Davis Guggenheim, Casey Meurer, Carolyn Bernstein, and Tim Horsburgh	Nominated	
Primetime Emmy Awards	September 5, 2026	Outstanding Cinematography for a Nonfiction Program	Jean Dakar	Nominated	
Producers Guild of America Awards	February 28, 2026	Outstanding Producer of Documentary Theatrical Motion Pictures	Jean Dakar, Anna Hashmi, Tamara Kotevska, and Jordanco Petkovski	Nominated	
Wildscreen Panda Awards	2026	Music Award	Joe Wilson Davies, Hunouk Park	Nominated	
Wildscreen Panda Awards	2026	Producer / Director Award	Tamara Kotevska	Won	

== See also ==
- List of submissions to the 98th Academy Awards for Best International Feature Film
- List of Macedonian submissions for the Academy Award for Best International Feature Film
