= The ABCs of Book Banning =

2023 documentary short film

- Directed by: Sheila Nevins; Trish Adlesic; Nazenet Habtezghi
- Produced by: Trish Adlesic; Steven Bennett; Nina L. Diaz; Liza Burnett Fefferman; Peter Goldberg; Sheila Nevins; Albessant Smith
- Starring: Nikki Giovanni; Amanda Gorman; Lil Miss Hot Mess; Grace Linn
- Cinematography: Filippo Piscopo
- Edited by: Gladys Mae Murphy
- Production company: MTV Documentary Films
- Release date: 30 September 2023 (Woodstock Film Festival)
- Running time: 27 minutes
- Country: United States
- Language: English

The ABCs of Book Banning is a 2023 documentary short film directed by Sheila Nevins, Trish Adlesic, and Nazenet Habezghi. It premiered at the Woodstock Film Festival on September 30, 2023.

== Summary ==
The film features people discussing the mass banning of books relating to LGBT topics and issues of race, specifically in Florida.

Books featured include And Tango Makes Three, Maus, Ambitious Girl, Beloved, The Life of Rosa Parks, The Hips on the Drag Queen Go Swish, Swish, Swish, Anne Frank’s Diary: The Graphic Adaptation, The Hate U Give, All Boys Aren't Blue, and Gender Queer.

== Reception ==
=== Critical response ===
Josiah Teal of Film Threat gave the film a 9/10 score and stated: "ABCs of Book Banning does an excellent job summarizing the significant details in just under a half-hour. It speaks volumes about the importance of increasing perspectives through literature, especially at an early age." Jennie Kermode, writing for Eye For Film, gave the film 4.5/5 stars and summarized: "It’s a simple film, but more powerful for it: a film in defence of words which doesn’t need many to make its point."

However, Colin Souter of Roger Ebert.com gave it a mixed review stating that:

The movie means well, but it’s artless in its approach. It preaches to the choir for twenty-seven minutes, but never provides any answers on how students or parents at these schools can fight the policies or obtain copies of the banned books elsewhere. This is the kind of film you show on day one at a Library Science 101 class, a power-point, listicle version of “Kids Say the Darndest Things.” I agree with everything it’s saying, but as a documentary, it lacks power and substance.

=== Accolades ===
It was nominated for Best Documentary Short Film at the 96th Academy Awards.

== See also ==
- Critical race theory
- Book banning in the United States (2021–present)
- Book censorship in the United States
- Proposed bans of LGBT-themed books in the United States
- Bibliophobia
