= Desperate Rescue: The Cathy Mahone Story =

- Genre: Action; Drama
- Written by: Guerdon Trueblood
- Directed by: Richard A. Colla
- Starring: Mariel Hemingway; Clancy Brown; Jeff Kober; James Russo; Lindsey Haun; Andrew Masset
- Music by: Fred Karlin
- Country of origin: United States
- Original language: English

Production
- Executive producers: Orly Adelson; Roger Gimbel
- Producer: David Hamburger
- Cinematography: Rick Bota
- Editor: John A. Martinelli
- Running time: 93 minutes
- Production companies: Gimbel-Adelson Productions; Multimedia Motion Pictures; World International Network

Original release
- Network: NBC
- Release: January 18, 1993

Desperate Rescue: The Cathy Mahone Story is a 1993 American made-for-television drama film starring Mariel Hemingway. It was directed by Richard A. Colla and originally premiered on NBC on January 18, 1993.

== Plot ==
Film based on a true story of a woman who tries to rescue her 7-year-old daughter from the Middle East after she is abducted by her Jordanian father.

== Cast ==
- Mariel Hemingway as Cathy Mahone
- Clancy Brown as Dave Chattelier
- Jeff Kober as J.D. Roberts
- James Russo as Don Feeney
- Lindsey Haun as Lauren Mahone
- Andrew Masset as Ali

== Reception ==
The Movie Scene stated: "What this all boils down to is that "Desperate Rescue: The Cathy Mahone Story" is entertaining in a typical made for TV way but it is a story which to me probably has the greatest power for those close to the people involved and like some true story movies it doesn't translate well for those who stumble across it who don't know the ins and outs of the true story".
