= A Tree of Life: The Pittsburgh Synagogue Shooting =

2022 documentary film directed by Trish Adlesic

- Directed by: Trish Adlesic
- Produced by: Trish Adlesic; Susan Margolin
- Cinematography: Derek Howard
- Edited by: Lorena Luciano; Eric Schuman
- Music by: Amelia Allen; Laura Karpman
- Production company: HBO Documentary Films
- Release date: 2022
- Running time: 80 minutes
- Country: United States
- Language: English

A Tree of Life: The Pittsburgh Synagogue Shooting is a 2022 documentary film about the survivors, family and community of the eleven people killed in the 2018 Pittsburgh synagogue shooting, the deadliest antisemitic attack in U.S. history.

The film was directed by Trish Adlesic. Adlesic was visiting her father in Pittsburgh when the gunman walked into the Tree of Life synagogue and perpetrated the killing.

Idina Menzel co-wrote the original song "A Tree of Life" with her songwriting collaborator Kate Diaz for the film.

== Cast ==
- Anthony Fienberg
- Michele Rosenthal
- Diane Rosenthal
- Carol Black
- Joe Charny
- Audrey Glickman
- Andrea Wedner
- Stephen Weiss
- Dan Leger
- Jonathan Perlman
- Jeffrey Myers
- Barry Werber
- Magali Fienberg
- Ellen Surloff
- Augie Siriano
- Martin Gaynor
- Ron Wedner
- Wasi Mohamed
- Brad Orsini
- Eliezer Rosenthal
- Joy Rosenthal
- Hannibal Locumbe
