= Olly Olly Oxen Free (film) =

1978 film by Richard A. Colla

- Film poster
- Directed by: Richard A. Colla
- Written by: Eugene Poinc
- Based on: Richard A. Colla (story); Maria L. de Ossio (story)
- Produced by: Richard A. Colla
- Starring: Katharine Hepburn
- Cinematography: Gayne Rescher
- Edited by: Lee Burch
- Music by: Bob Alcivar
- Production companies: Rico Lion; Sanrio Communications
- Distributed by: Sanrio Communications
- Release date: August 25, 1978
- Running time: 89 minutes
- Country: United States
- Language: English

Olly Olly Oxen Free (also known as The Great Balloon Adventure or The Great Balloon Race) is a 1978 American family adventure film directed by Richard A. Colla and starring Katharine Hepburn. The screenplay by Eugene Poinc is based on a story by Poinc, Colla, and Maria L. de Ossio. The title is derived from "Olly olly oxen free" a phrase used in children's games to indicate that those in hiding came out into the open safely and freely.

== Plot ==
Eccentric Miss Pudd is the owner of what she considers an antiques store but most would call a junkyard. She frequently refuses to part with her merchandise because of its sentimental or historical value. However, she does agree to lend some items to two boys, Alby and Chris, who befriend her.

The boys explain that they are repairing an antique hot air balloon that belonged to Alby's grandfather, an adventurous stunt man named The Great Sandusky. In honor and memory of Alby's grandfather, who died one year earlier and is sorely missed by Alby, they plan to take the balloon aloft to celebrate the grandfather's birthday.

The balloon is accidentally inflated and launched, with the two boys and their English sheepdog in the basket. Miss Pudd chases after them in her antique car and ends up riding the anchor dangling from the bottom of the basket. After she is pulled up, the balloon continues to drift and gets lost in a fog.

That night, they drift finally to Los Angeles, where a police helicopter demands that they land. The balloon lands on the stage of the Hollywood Bowl, at an outdoor concert where the orchestra is playing Tchaikovsky's 1812 Overture. Amidst fireworks, the audience thinks the balloon landing is part of the show and is enthralled as the ragamuffin crew disembarks and is sent home.

== Cast ==
- Katharine Hepburn as Miss Pudd
- Kevin McKenzie as Alby
- Dennis Dimster as Chris
- Peter Kilman as Mailman
- Jayne Marie Mansfield
- Joseph McBride as spectator at Hollywood Bowl

== Production ==
Olly Olly Oxen Free was a low-budget film that was filmed in the summer of 1976, on location in the Napa Valley, California. The locales that were used were in Calistoga and St. Helena, California. The Japanese toy company Sanrio funded the production, with the goal of releasing a children's film to complement their toy line. From 1977 to 1985, Sanrio produced feature-length films through their Sanrio Films label.

Although intended for a theatrical release, Olly Olly Oxen Free in its various incarnations, had a lease on life as a home media release with HBO Video. The DVD release was on August 4, 1999. (Note: Hepburn at age 68, did her own stunts in Olly Olly Oxen Free, including hanging from a rope harness while being towed upward by the hot-air balloon.)

== Reception ==
After a limited theatrical release in 1978, Olly Olly Oxen Free did not play in New York until five years later, when the film played at the Thalia Theater. Hepburn's biographer, William Mann, called Olly Olly Oxen Free, "nearly plotless" and stated that Hepburn's timing with the young co-stars was off.

Film reviewer Leonard Maltin, in Leonard Maltin's 2013 Movie Guide was charitable, saying "Kate's always worth watching, but except for airborne scenes, this film is nothing special."

In 2025, The Hollywood Reporter listed Olly Olly Oxen Free as having the best stunts of 1978.
