= Inside Europe: Ten Years of Turmoil =

- Country of origin: United Kingdom
- Original language: English
- No. of seasons: 1
- No. of episodes: 3

Production
- Producer: Norma Percy
- Production company: Brook Lapping Productions

Original release
- Network: BBC Two

Inside Europe: Ten Years of Turmoil is a three-part documentary broadcast on BBC Two in early 2019. It covers matters affecting the European Union in the 2010s, and in particular Brexit, the European debt crisis and the European migrant crisis.

== Participants ==
The documentary includes interviews with Donald Tusk, Jean-Claude Juncker, Matteo Renzi, Nicolas Sarkozy, Francois Hollande, Wolfgang Schäuble, George Osborne and Yanis Varoufakis.

== Episodes ==
No. in series	Title	Directed by	Original release date	UK viewers (millions)
1	"We Quit"	Tim Stirzaker, Tania Rakhmanova	28 January 2019	1.98
2	"Going for Broke"	Tania Rakhmanova, Tim Stirzaker	4 February 2019	1.69
3	"Unstoppable"	Tania Rakhmanova, Tim Stirzaker	11 February 2019	N/A (<1.50) (Note: Not reported in the weekly top 15 programmes for four-screen viewer ratings.)

== Reception ==
The series was well received by critics, being praised for its quality and depth amongst other things.

== See also ==
- Fire at Sea
- It Will Be Chaos
- Human Flow
- Sea Sorrow
