= Jean Dakar =

British cinematographer and producer

- Occupations: Cinematographer; Producer
- Years active: 2014–present

Jean Dakar is a British cinematographer and producer.

== Life and career ==
Jean was born to Syrian-Turkish parents and raised between Germany, Spain, and the United Kingdom. He studied Film Production at the Arts University Bournemouth in Poole, England.

Jean collaborated with director Tamara Kotevska on the feature documentary The Tale of Silyan (2025), where he served as cinematographer and producer. The film was produced in association with National Geographic and was selected as North Macedonia’s official submission for the 98th Academy Awards. Other credits include The Walk (2023) and upcoming projects such as Man vs. Flock (2026) and The Mammoths That Escaped the Kingdom of Erlik Khan.

== Selected filmography ==
Year	Title	Contribution	Note
2023	The Walk	Cinematographer	Documentary
2025	The Tale of Silyan	Cinematographer and producer	Documentary
2026	Man vs. Flock	Cinematographer	Documentary
TBA	The Mammoths That Escaped the Kingdom of Erlik Khan	Co-writer, cinematographer and producer	Documentary

== Awards and nominations ==
Year	Result	Award	Category	Work	Ref.
2026	Nominated	Primetime Emmy Awards	Outstanding Cinematography for a Nonfiction Program	The Tale of Silyan	
2025	Won	International Documentary Association	Best Cinematography	The Tale of Silyan	
2025	Won	International Documentary Association	Best Feature Documentary	The Tale of Silyan	
2025	Nominated	Critics' Choice Documentary Awards	Best Cinematography	The Tale of Silyan	
2026	Nominated	Cinema Eye Honors	Outstanding Cinematography	The Tale of Silyan	
2026	Nominated	Producers Guild of America Awards	Best Documentary Motion Picture	The Tale of Silyan	
2026	Nominated	Film Independent Spirit Awards	Best Documentary Feature	The Tale of Silyan	
