= 40th News and Documentary Emmy Awards =

40th News & Documentary Emmy Awards
- Date: September 24, 2019
- Location: Lincoln Center's Alice Tully Hall, New York

The 40th News & Documentary Emmy Awards were presented by the National Academy of Television Arts and Sciences (NATAS), honoring the best in American news and documentary programming in 2018. The ceremony took place on September 24, 2019, at the Lincoln Center's Alice Tully Hall in New York, United States. The nominations were announced on July 25, 2019, with CBS's news magazine 60 Minutes leading the nominations with 23 and PBS being the most nominated network with 47 nominations.

NBC News's chief foreign affairs correspondent and MSNBC's Andrea Mitchell Reports host Andrea Mitchell received the Lifetime Achievement Award for "her groundbreaking 50-year career covering domestic and international affairs.".

== Winners and nominees ==
The nominations were announced on July 25, 2019.

=== Lifetime Achievement Award ===
- Andrea Mitchell

=== News Programming ===
Outstanding Coverage of a Breaking News Story in a Newscast	Outstanding Coverage of a Breaking News Story in a Newsmagazine
VICE News Tonight: "Moment of Truth: Kavanaugh and Ford" (HBO); World News Tonight with David Muir and Nightline: "Crisis at the Border" (ABC); CNN Newsroom: "CNN New York Bomb Evacuation" (CNN); NBC Nightly News: "State of Emergency: Hurricane Florence" (NBC); VICE News Tonight: "Israel and Palestine: A Deeper Divide" (HBO)	60 Minutes: "The Students of Stoneman Douglas" (CBS); 20/20 and ABC News Special Events: "Strike on Syria" (ABC); 20/20: "Triumph in Thailand" (ABC); 60 Minutes: "President George H. W. Bush" (CBS); 60 Minutes: "The Compromise and the Kavanaugh Vote" (CBS)
Outstanding Continuing Coverage of a News Story in a Newscast	Outstanding Continuing Coverage of a News Story in a Newsmagazine
VICE News Tonight: "Yemen's Forgotten War" (HBO); BBC World News America: "Mexico's Deadly Drug War" (BBC World News); BBC World News America: "Yemen's Young Victims" (BBC World News); CBS News: "Catholic Church Sex Abuse Scandal" (CBS); VICE News Tonight: "Afghanistan: A War Without Winners" (HBO)	60 Minutes: "War Crime" (CBS); 60 Minutes: "High Velocity" (CBS); 60 Minutes: "Inside the Epidemic" (CBS); Fault Lines: "Between War and the Ban" (Al Jazeera International USA); MSNBC's On Assignment with Richard Engel: "Putin's Russia" (MSNBC)
Outstanding Feature Story in a Newscast	Outstanding Feature Story in a Newsmagazine
VICE News Tonight: "Zero Tolerance" (HBO); CBS News: "ON THE ROAD with Steve Hartman: A Facebook Message that Sparked Hope" (CBS); Nightline: "Exodus: A Mother's Journey" (ABC); PBS NewsHour: "Exodus: A Mother's Journey" (PBS); CBS Sunday Morning: "Borrowed Time" (CBS)	60 Minutes: "The Legacy of Lynching" (CBS); 20/20: "Becoming Michelle: A First Lady’s Journey with Robin Roberts" (ABC); 60 Minutes: "The Greek Freak" (CBS); 60 Minutes: "The Photo Ark" (CBS); 60 Minutes: "Tim Green" (CBS)
Outstanding Investigative Report in a Newscast	Outstanding Investigative Report in a Newsmagazine
PBS NewsHour: "Rape, Harassment and Retaliation in the U.S. Forest Service: Women Firefighters Tell Their Stories" (PBS); AC360: "Undercover with Nigeria’s Pushermen" (CNN); CBS News: "Healthcare Fraud in America" (CBS); CBS News: "Child Labor in the DRC" (CBS); Connect the World with Becky Anderson: "Yemen Air Strikes: Made in America" (CNN International)	Fault Lines: "Adoption Inc." (Al Jazeera International USA); 60 Minutes: "Flying Under the Radar" (CBS); 60 Minutes: "Inside the Secret Archive" (CBS); Case Cleared: How Rape Goes Unpunished in America (Newsy); Real Sports with Bryant Gumbel: "Shots Fired: The Jordan Edwards Story" (HBO)
Outstanding Hard News Feature Story in a Newscast	Outstanding Breaking News Coverage
PBS News Hour: "Yemen's Spiraling Hunger Crisis is a Man-Made Disaster" (PBS); Nightline: "Crisis in Yemen" (NBC); How a Gang Hunted and Killed a 15-Year Old in the Bronx (The New York Times); I Just Simply Did What He Wanted (The New York Times); VICE News Tonight: "The Killing Rooms of Mosul" (HBO)	ABC News Special Events: "Hurricane Michael" (ABC); CBS News: "The Pittsburgh Synagogue Shooting" (CBS); Genoa Bridge Collapse (CNN International); Yemen School Bus Bombing (CNN International); NBC News Specials: "Parkland School Shooting" (NBC)
Outstanding News Special	Outstanding News Discussion and Analysis
48 Hours and CBS This Morning: "39 Days" (CBS); Parkland Town Hall (CNN); CNN Heroes: An All-Star Tribute (CNN); CBS Sunday Morning: "CBS Sunday Morning 40 Years" (CBS); CBS Sunday Morning: "Mind Matters" (CBS); VICE News Tonight: "2018 Midterms: The Activist Election" (HBO)	AC360: "Finding Hope: Battling America's Suicide Crisis" (CNN); Fareed Zakaria GPS: "Fareed Zakaria on the Rise of Populism and the Fall of the Post-War Order" (CNN); MSNBC Special: "Everyday Racism in America" (MSNBC); Meet the Press: "Special Edition: Climate Crisis" (NBC); The Rachel Maddow Show: "Ad lib Flynn doc" (MSNBC)
Outstanding Live Interview	Outstanding Edited Interview
Amanpour: "Archbishop of New York Cardinal Timothy Dolan, interviewed by Christiane Amanpour" (CNN International); MSNBC Dayside: "Andrea Mitchell interviews Dan Coats" (MSNBC); MSNBC Dayside: "Zero Tolerance and Separated Families" (MSNBC); Special Report: "Interview with Russian President Vladimir Putin" (Fox News); State of the Union: "Jake Tapper interviews Sheriff Israel" (CNN); This Week with George Stephanopoulos: "After Parkland: NRA and Students Respond" (ABC)	Dateline NBC: "Bringing Down Bill Cosby: Andrea Constand Speaks" (NBC); 20/20: "Miracle Boys" (ABC); 60 Minutes: "Stormy Daniels" (CBS); ABC News: "James Comey: The Interview" (ABC); PBS NewsHour: "These Girls Escaped Boko Haram. Now They’re Pleading for Help to Save Their Generation" (PBS)
Outstanding Science, Medical and Environmental Report	Outstanding Arts, Culture or Entertainment Report
AMHQ: "Dangers of Tornadoes Depicted Through Immersive Mixed Reality" (The Weather Channel); 60 Minutes: "100,000 Women" (CBS); 60 Minutes: "A Plastic Plague" (CBS); 60 Minutes: "For Better or For Worse" (CBS); PBS NewsHour: "The End of AIDS: Far From Over" (PBS)	Art and Soul (Great Big Story); 60 Minutes: "Into the Wild" (CBS); CNN Special Report: "Deadly Haze: Inside the Fraternity Crisis" (CNN); Follow This by BuzzFeed News: "Teen Bus" (Netflix); NBC News Report: "A New Dawn--One Father's Love Helps Family Thrive After Son's Near-Death Experience" (NBC); VICE News Tonight: "YouTube's Hidden Camera Problem" (HBO)
Outstanding Business, Consumer or Economic Report
Hidden Cost: Our Laws Have Not Kept Up With the Climate (The Weather Channel Digital and Telemundo with Efran Film); CNN Investigates: "Uber Sexual Assault" (CNN); Hala Gorani Tonight: "Is Your Electric Car Ethical? Child Labor in DRC Cobalt Mines" (CNN International); PBS NewsHour: "Kept Out" (PBS); Retro Report: "Future of Aging" (Retro Report and Quartz)

=== Programming in Spanish ===
Outstanding Newscast or Newsmagazine in Spanish	Outstanding Coverage of a Breaking News Story in Spanish
Noticias Telemundo Mediodía (Telemundo); Al Punto (Univision); Aquí y Ahora (Univision); Noticias Telemundo (Telemundo); Noticiero Univision (Univision)	Noticias Telemundo: "Emergencia en la Frontera" (Telemundo); Aquí y Ahora: "Caminando al borde (The Border's Edge)" (Univision); Noticias Telemundo: "What is Happening with the Children?" (Telemundo); Noticias Telemundo Digital: "Caravan Breaks into Mexico" (Telemundo); Noticiero Univision: "Crisis en Nicaragua (Crisis in Nicaragua)" (Univision)
Outstanding Investigative Journalism in Spanish	Outstanding Feature Story in Spanish
Aquí y Ahora: "Muerte río arriba (Death up the River)" (Univision); Aquí y Ahora: "Los magnates de Dios (The Magnates of God)" (Univision); Chapecoense: Las claves oscuras del siniestro (CNN en Español); Latinos en el Corredor de la Muerte (Latinos on Death Row) (Discovery Networks Latin America/US Hispanic)	Univision News Digital: "El legado de tolerancia cero: niños traumatizados y sin tratamiento" (Univision); Atrapados en el Silencio (CNN en Español); SC Reportajes: "Carmelo Diaz - en las buenas y en las malas" (ESPN Deportes); Univision News Digital: "America First: El Legado de una Redada" (Univision); VICE News Tonight: "Walking to America" (HBO)

=== Documentary Programming ===
Best Documentary	Outstanding Current Affairs Documentary
HBO Documentary Films: "I Am Evidence" (HBO); FRONTLINE: "Exodus: The Journey Continues" (PBS); Independent Lens: "I Am Not Your Negro" (PBS); POV: "Nowhere to Hide" (PBS); POV: "Quest" (PBS)	HBO Documentary Films: "It Will Be Chaos" (HBO); FRONTLINE: "The Facebook Dilemma" (PBS); HBO Documentary Films: "Stolen Daughters: Kidnapped by Boko Haram" (HBO); Lifeboat (Spin Film and RYOT); POV: "Nowhere to Hide" (PBS)
Outstanding Politics and Government Documentary	Outstanding Social Issue Documentary
Doc World: "Armed With Faith" (World); FRONTLINE: "Separated: Children at the Border" (PBS); Independent Lens: "The Judge" (PBS); No Greater Law (A&E); Reversing Roe (Netflix)	Crime + Punishment (Hulu); POV: "Quest" (PBS); POV: "Survivors" (PBS); Rest in Power: The Trayvon Martin Story (Paramount Network); YouTube Originals: "The Price of Free" (YouTube)
Outstanding Investigative Documentary	Outstanding Historical Documentary
FRONTLINE: "Documenting Hate" (PBS); No Stone Unturned (VOD); FRONTLINE: "Myanmar's Killing Fields" (PBS); FRONTLINE: "UN Sex Abuse Scandal" (PBS); HBO Documentary Films: "I Am Evidence" (HBO)	HBO Documentary Films: "King in the Wilderness" (HBO); Going to War (PBS); HBO Documentary Films: "The Oslo Diaries" (HBO); Independent Lens: "Tell Them We Are Rising: The Story of Black Colleges and Universities" (PBS); Intent to Destroy: Death, Denial, & Depiction (Starz)
Outstanding Arts and Culture Documentary	Outstanding Science and Technology Documentary
Independent Lens: "I Am Not Your Negro" (PBS); HBO Documentary Films: "Arthur Miller: Writer" (HBO); HBO Documentary Films: "Believer" (HBO); HBO Documentary Films: "The Price of Everything" (HBO); ReMastered: Who Shot the Sheriff? (Netflix)	Science Fair (National Geographic); Independent Lens: "The Cleaners" (PBS); NOVΛ: "Decoding the Weather Machine" (PBS); NOVΛ: "Transplanting Hope" (PBS)
Outstanding Nature Documentary	Outstanding Business and Economic Documentary
CNN Films: "Trophy" (CNN); Independent Lens: "Wildland" (PBS); Into the Okavango (National Geographic); Nature: "Sex, Lies and Butterflies" (PBS); Nature: "Super Cats: Cats in Every Corner" (PBS)	VICE Special Report: "Panic: The Untold Story of the 2008 Financial Crisis" (HBO); America ReFramed: "Personal Statement" (World Channel); FRONTLINE: "The Pension Gamble" (PBS); Independent Lens: "Dolores" (PBS); POV: "The Workers Cup" (PBS)
Outstanding Short Documentary
Trans in America: Texas Strong (them. and Condé Nast Entertainment); Beneath the Ink (GQ and Condé Nast Entertainment); HBO Documentary Films: "Traffic Stop" (HBO); Meet the Press Film Festival with AFI: "Guns Found Here" (NBC); POV Shorts and The New York Times: "Earthline" (PBS); The Family Business: Trump and Taxes (Showtime)

=== Craft ===
Best Story in a Newscast	Best Story in a Newsmagazine
VICE News Tonight: "Yemen's Forgotten War" (HBO); AC360: "The Parkland Diaries" (CNN); VICE News Tonight "Afghanistan: A War Without Winners" (HBO); VICE News Tonight: "The Killing Rooms of Mosul" (HBO); World News Tonight with David Muir and Nightline: "The Rohingya: No Way Out" (ABC)	60 Minutes: "War Crime" (CBS); 60 Minutes: "For Better or For Worse" (CBS); 60 Minutes: "Orphans of War" (CBS); 60 Minutes: "Tim Green" (CBS); Real Sports with Bryant Gumbel: "Slaves No More: The Emancipation of Child Jockeys in the Middle East" (HBO)
Outstanding New Approaches: Current News	Outstanding New Approaches: Documentary
One Building, One Bomb: How Assad Gassed His Own People (The New York Times); Yemen's Skies of Terror (Contrast and Al Jazeera Digital); Guns in America (TIME); Warming Planet, Vanishing Heritage (The New York Times); Reveal from The Center for Investigative Reporting: "The Office of Missing Children" (The Center for Investigative Reporting)	FRONTLINE: "The Last Generation" (PBS); Polar Obsession VR (National Geographic); POV Shorts: "Give" (PBS); An Israeli Soldier Killed a Medic in Gaza. We Investigated the Fatal Shot (The New York Times); Univision Digital: "When Abortion is a Lifeline" (Univision)
Outstanding New Approaches: Arts, Lifestyle and Culture	Outstanding Research
Vox Earworm: "The Most Feared Song in Jazz, Explained" (Vox); A Moment in Mexico (The New York Times); Birth Control Your Own Adventure (The New York Times); Conception (The New York Times); Your Train Is Delayed. Why? (The New York Times)	Independent Lens: "Dawnland" (PBS); FRONTLINE: "The Facebook Dilemma" (PBS); Hope & Fury: MLK, the Movement and the Media (NBC); ReMastered: Tricky Dick & the Man in Black (Netflix); Reversing Roe (Netflix); The New York Times Opinion: "Operation InfeKtion, Russian Disinformation from Cold War to Kanye" (The New York Times)
Outstanding Editing: News	Outstanding Editing: Documentary
Your Train Is Delayed. Why? – Liz Deegan & Ora DeKornfeld (The New York Times); Nightline: "Ambush at Copper Canyon" – Brendan Cusack & Neil Sass (ABC); Retro Reporter: "Operation Ceasefire" – Sandrine Isambert (Retro Report and The New York Times); VICE News Tonight: "Walking to America" – Cameron Dennis, Ryo Ikegami & Alejandro Soto (HBO); VICE News Tonight: "Zero Tolerance" – Cameron Dennis & Shilpi Gupta (HBO)	Independent Lens: "Wildland" – Alex Jablonski, David Nordstrom & Katrina Taylor (PBS); Independent Lens: "Unrest" – Emiliano Battista & Kim Roberts (PBS); Rest in Power: The Trayvon Martin Story – Chad Beck, Devin Concannon, Jenner Furst & Chris Passig (Paramount Network); Take Your Pills – Jen Fineran (Netflix); This Is Home: A Refugee Story – Toby Shimin (EPIX)
Outstanding Video Journalism: News	Outstanding Cinematography: Documentary
VICE News Tonight: "The Killing Rooms of Mosul" – Singeli Agnew, Adam Desiderio, Ayar Mohammed Rasoo & Mohamed Abu Nahel (HBO); 60 Minutes: "Fly Like an Eagle" – Chris Everson, Guy Hernandez & Ian Robbie (CBS); Dateline NBC: "City of Angels" – Sam Painter, John DeTarsio, Blake Hottle, Brad Serreno, Sal Malguanera & Rich White, Terrell Tangonan (NBC); VICE News Tonight: "Gaza: A Day of Reckoning" – Singeli Agnew (HBO); VICE News Tonight: "Walking to America" – Roberto Daza, Jika González & Karl Mollohan (HBO)	Independent Lens: "Wildland" – Ryan Heffernan, Kahlil Hudson, Alex Jablonski & Grayson Schaffer (PBS); 700 Sharks – Yanick Gentil, Jean-Christophe Granjon, Antonin Guilbert, Yann Hubert, Kevin Peyrusse, Thibault Rauby & Roberto Rinaldi (Nat Geo Wild); Bayonet Media: "Pressing on: The Letterpress Film" – Joseph Vella (VOD); The Flood – Mike Amos, Brad Bestelink, Alex Cooke, Wim Forster & Richard Uren (National Geographic); The Wild Andes: "Patagonia Untamed" – Christian Baumeister, Christian Muñoz Donoso, Christiaan Muñoz Salas & Moris Muñoz Salas (Smithsonian Channel)
Outstanding Graphic Design and Art Direction	Outstanding Music and Sound
Inside North Korea's Dynasty (National Geographic); CNN Digital: "Destroyed" (CNN); Neanderthal (PBS); The Amazing Human Body (PBS); Anyone Can Create a New Emoji. Here's an Animated Guide to Doing it Right (The Washington Post); VICE News Tonight: "The Trouble with Tesla" (HBO)	HBO Documentary Films: "Stolen Daughters: Kidnapped by Boko Haram" – Andrew Phillips (HBO); Independent Lens: "Downlands" – Jennifer Kreisberg, Philip Mann & Christopher D. Anderson (PBS); Native America – Ed Tomney, Geof Thurber & Greg McCleary (PBS); Nature: "Super Cats: Cats in Every Corner" – Kate Hopkins, Graham Wild, Bleeding Fingers, Monica Sonand, Russell Emanuel & Ed Campbell (PBS); The Wild Ones: "Extreme Survival" – Oliver Heuss, Kathleen Brenner, Carmen López Carreño & Alexander Weuffen (Smithsonian Channel)
Outstanding Lighting Direction and Scenic Design	Outstanding Writing
God Knows Where I Am – Brian Ariotti, Jedd Wider, Todd Wider & Gerardo Puglia (PBS); A Crime to Remember: "The Bad Old Days" – Alex Peterson & Deana Sidney (Investigation Discovery); CNN Original Series: "Pope: The Most Powerful Man in History" – Joshua Liberman, Kristian Dane Lawing, Jon Chaifetz, Beau Kegler & Matthew Joffe (CNN); President George HW Bush Funeral Live – Steven Brill, Greg Addison & Monica Rose (ABC); The Van Jones Show – Steven Brill, Robert Hunter, Renee Cullen, Niel Galen, Dan Rousseau, Brett Kelly, Guy Pepper & Jeff Young (CNN)	60 Minutes: "War Crime" – Written by Katie Kerbstat, Scott Pelley & Nicole Young (CBS); FRONTLINE: "Documenting Hate" – Written by Richard Rowley (PBS); Hope & Fury: MLK, the Movement and the Media – Written by Phil Bertelsen, Rachel Dretzin & Andrew Lack (NBC); NOVΛ: "Black Hope Apocalypse" – Written by Rushmore DeNooyer (PBS); CBS Sunday Morning: "At Risk" – Written by Sari Aviv & Erin Moriarty (CBS); The New York Times Opinion: "Operation InfeKtion, Russian Disinformation from Cold War to Kanye" – Written by Andrew Blackwell, Adam B. Ellick & Adam Westbrook (The New York Times)
Outstanding Promotional Announcement
CNN Original Series: "The History of Comedy Season 2 Campaign" (CNN); Operation Toussaint: "Operation Toussaint Promo Trailer" (DNA Films); Starstruck (National Geographic); U.S Secret Service: On the Front Line (National Geographic)

=== Regional News ===
Outstanding Regional News Story: Spot or Breaking News	Outstanding Regional News Story: Investigative Report
WXIA 11Alive News: "Charlie's Ark" (Atlanta, Georgia) (WXIA-TV); KPNX 12 News: "President Trump Rally" (Phoenix, Arizona) (KPNX-TV); WPLG Local 10 News: "Stoneman Douglas Massacre" (Miami / Ft. Lauderdale, Florida) (WPLG-TV); NBC 5 News at 10: "Craziest Thing I've Ever Seen" (Dallas–Fort Worth, Texas) (KXAS-TV); News 4 New York: "Terror in Tribeca" (New York, New York) (WNBC-TV)	KING 5News: "Sick and Forgotten at Hanford" (Seattle, Washington) (KING-TV); WTSP 10News: "Zombie Campaigns" (St. Petersburg, Florida) (WTSP-TV); NBC Bay Area 11pm News: "Kicked Out" (San Francisco, California) (KNTV-TV); Insight with John Ferrugia: "Traded and Trafficked" (Colorado) (Rocky Mountain PBS); KPHO News: "Breast Implant Illness" (Phoenix, Arizona) (KPHO-TV)

== Multiple wins ==
Shows that received multiple wins
Nominations	Program	Network
5	VICE News Tonight	HBO
5	60 Minutes	PBS
4	HBO Documentary Films	HBO
4	Independent Lens	PBS
2	FRONTLINE	PBS
2	PBS NewsHour	PBS

Wins by Network
Nominations	Network
10	HBO
9	PBS
6	CBS
3	CNN
2	National Geographic
2	Telemundo
2	The New York Times
2	Univision

== Multiple nominations ==
Shows that received multiple nominations
Nominations	Program	Network
23	60 Minutes	CBS
18	VICE News Tonight	HBO
12	Independent Lens	PBS
11	HBO Documentary Films	HBO
10	FRONTLINE	PBS
6	PBS NewsHour	PBS
6	POV	PBS
4	CBS News	CBS
4	CBS Sunday Morning	CBS
4	Aquí y Ahora	Univision
3	Nature	PBS
3	NOVΛ	PBS
3	20/20	ABC
3	Nightline	ABC
3	Noticias Telemundo	Telemundo
2	POV Shorts	PBS
2	Real Sports with Bryant Gumbel	HBO
2	AC360	CNN
2	CNN Original Series	CNN
2	World News Tonight with David Muir and Nightline	ABC
2	The New York Times Opinion	The New York Times
2	Your Train Is Delayed. Why?	The New York Times
2	Noticiero Univision	Univision
2	Univision News Digital	Univision
2	Dateline NBC	NBC
2	Hope & Fury: MLK, the Movement and the Media	NBC
2	Meet the Press	NBC
2	Reversing Roe	Netflix
2	MSNBC Dayside	MSNBC
2	Fault Lines	
2	BBC World News America	BBC World News
2	Rest in Power: The Trayvon Martin Story	Paramount Network
2	The Wild Andes	Smithsonian Channel

Nominations by Network
Nominations	Network
47	PBS
33	CBS
32	HBO
15	CNN
13	ABC
12	The New York Times
10	Univision
9	NBC
7	National Geographic
6	Netflix
5	CNN International
5	MSNBC
5	Telemundo
2	Al Jazeera International USA
2	BBC World News
2	CNN en Español
2	Paramount Network
2	Smithsonian Channel
2	VOD
2	World Channel
