= Sea Sorrow =

2017 film

- Film poster
- Directed by: Vanessa Redgrave
- Written by: Vanessa Redgrave
- Starring: Ralph Fiennes
- Release date: 18 May 2017 (Cannes)
- Running time: 74 minutes
- Country: United Kingdom
- Language: English

Sea Sorrow is a 2017 British documentary film about child refugees in the European migrant crisis, directed by Vanessa Redgrave. It was shown in the Special Screenings section at the 2017 Cannes Film Festival. On review aggregator Rotten Tomatoes, the film holds an approval rating of 67% based on 12 reviews, with an average rating of 5.4/10.

== Cast ==
- Ralph Fiennes as Prospero
- Emma Thompson as Sylvia Pankhurst

== See also ==
- Fire at Sea
- It Will Be Chaos
- Human Flow
- Inside Europe: Ten Years of Turmoil
