= Richard A. Colla =

American film director (1936–2021)

- Born: April 18, 1936
- Died: December 24, 2021 (aged 85); Beverly Hills, California, U.S.
- Other names: Dick Colla
- Occupations: Film director, television director, actor
- Years active: 1962–2000
- Spouse: Denise Alexander

Richard Anthony Colla (April 18, 1936 – December 24, 2021), sometimes credited as Dick Colla, was an American film and television director and actor.

== Life and career ==
Richard Anthony Colla was born on April 18, 1936.

On screen he played Tony Merritt on the soap opera Days of Our Lives. His directorial credits include The Virginian, Battlestar Galactica, McCloud, Miami Vice, MacGyver, Hunter; Murder, She Wrote; Gunsmoke, Ironside; Trapper John, M.D.; and other series.

Colla directed the feature films Olly Olly Oxen Free (1978) starring Katharine Hepburn, Fuzz (1972) starring Burt Reynolds, and Zig Zag (1970) starring George Kennedy. He was originally under consideration to direct the film Sometimes a Great Notion (1971) but was replaced by the film's star Paul Newman.

For much of the 1990s, he directed a number of television films his last credit being Growing Up Brady (2000).

Colla died in Beverly Hills, California on December 24, 2021, at the age of 85.

== Partial Filmography ==
- Zig Zag (1970)
- Fuzz (1972)
- The Questor Tapes (1974)
- Live Again, Die Again (1974)
- The UFO Incident (1975)
- Battlestar Galactica (1978)
- Olly Olly Oxen Free (1978)
- Don't Look Back: The Story of Leroy 'Satchel' Paige (1981)
- Something Is Out There (1988)
- Blind Witness (1989)
- Desperate Rescue: The Cathy Mahone Story (1993)
- Web of Deception (1994)
- Love's Deadly Triangle: The Texas Cadet Murder (1997)
- Ultimate Deception (1999)
- Blue Valley Songbird (1999)
- Growing Up Brady (2000)
