= Nuns vs. The Vatican =

2025 American documentary film

- Directed by: Lorena Luciano
- Produced by: Filippo Piscopo
- Cinematography: Filippo Piscopo
- Edited by: Lorena Luciano
- Music by: Miguel Bezanilla; Maria Pierantoni Giua
- Production companies: Film2 Productions; Mighty Entertainment
- Release date: September 6, 2025 (TIFF)
- Running time: 90 minutes
- Country: United States
- Languages: English; Italian; Slovenian

Nuns vs. The Vatican is a 2025 American documentary film directed and edited by Lorena Luciano. It explores Catholic Church sexual abuse cases, with a group of nuns exposing predatory priests abusing nuns. Mariska Hargitay serves as an executive producer under her Mighty Entertainment banner.

It had its world premiere at the 2025 Toronto International Film Festival on September 6, 2025.

== Premise ==
Explores Catholic Church sexual abuse cases, with a group of nuns exposing predatory priests abusing nuns. Including: a nun breaking thirty years of silence to bring allegations against prominent Jesuit Father Marko Rupnik, who despite numerous accusations of abuse continued to be an active priest; Lucetta Scaraffia, who resigned from the Vatican's magazine after receiving pushback for coverage of nun abuse; journalist Federica Tourn, who pieced together testimonies; and activist Barbara Dorris who advocated for victims.

== Production ==
Production took place under the title #Nunstoo. It has received support from International Documentary Association, Sundance Institute, and New York State Council on the Arts.

== Release ==
It had its world premiere at the 2025 Toronto International Film Festival on September 6, 2025.
