= No Greater Law =

- Directed by: Tom Dumican
- Release date: 2018
- Country: United Kingdom
- Language: English

No Greater Law is a 2018 British documentary film directed by Tom Dumican and produced by Jesse Lichtenstein about an investigation into faith healing in Idaho’s Treasure Valley. It was released in the United States by A&E, after which it was nominated for Outstanding Politics and Government Documentary at the 40th News and Documentary Emmy Awards.
