= Nelson Sardelli =

American actor (born 1934)

Nelson Sardelli (born September 20, 1934) is a Brazilian-born singer, actor, and comedian of Italian descent. Best known as an entertainer in Las Vegas, Sardelli has acted in films such as Myra Breckinridge and The Professionals. He was awarded the Golden Pillow Award from the International Entertainer School of Las Vegas in 2008. Sardelli is the biological father of actress Mariska Hargitay.

== Early life ==
Sardelli was born in São Paulo, Brazil, to parents who had immigrated there from Italy.

== Career ==
In 1956, Sardelli was working as an analyst for General Motors. He decided to immigrate to Pontiac, Michigan, but found out there had been widespread layoffs there. After serving in the Army, Sardelli returned to Pontiac to work. Not liking his job, he returned to Arthur Murray's dance school before finding a short career performing at the Old Mill Tavern in Waterford, Michigan. He returned to Brazil after his uncle got him a well-paying construction job there.

While back in Brazil, Sardelli met a sportscaster who wrote for a prominent sport publication. This publication ran a two-page story about Sardelli's burgeoning career in the United States. This story was a pivotal moment in boosting Sardelli's entertainment career, as it gave him more attention, and he soon returned to the country. Despite initial struggles, Sardelli found success performing at the Thunderbird in Las Vegas, which also led to him serving as an opening act for Judy Garland. His career would ultimately center on performances in Las Vegas, with one of his most notable routines being that of a "gay cowboy." He is a freemason. He became a regular at the Flamingo and performed throughout the world.

Sardelli is a singer, actor, and comedian who is best known as an entertainer in Las Vegas. He has acted in films including Myra Breckinridge and The Professionals. Star Shine, Sardelli's fundraising event for mentally disabled children, was an annual spectacle in Atlantic City. In 2008, he was awarded the Golden Pillow Award from the International Entertainer School of Las Vegas.

== Personal life ==
Sardelli has been a full-time resident of Las Vegas since 1965.

Sardelli had a relationship with actress Jayne Mansfield in the 1960s. Mansfield indicated that she planned to marry Sardelli when her divorce from her husband, Mickey Hargitay, was finalized. On April 30, 1963, Mansfield obtained a divorce from Hargitay in Juarez, Mexico; Sardelli accompanied Mansfield to Juarez. Sardelli's relationship with Mansfield ended in June 1963.

In a 1992 biography of Mansfield, author Raymond Strait alleged that Sardelli was the biological father of Mansfield's daughter, Mariska Hargitay. At the time, it was assumed that Hargitay's father was the man who raised her: Mansfield's ex-husband, Mickey Hargitay. Mariska Hargitay, who was born in 1964, was 25 years old when she learned that Sardelli was her biological father. She first met Sardelli when she was 30 after seeing him perform in Atlantic City, and she developed a relationship with him and his other daughters. In May 2025, Hargitay publicly confirmed in her HBO documentary, My Mom Jayne, that Sardelli is her biological father. Sardelli appeared in the documentary.

Sardelli had three daughters with his first wife, Fledia Fay Sardelli, who died in July 2012. Their eldest daughter, Venetia Carmela Antonia, died in 2001. Their other two daughters, Giovanna and Pietra, participated in Hargitay's 2025 documentary.

As of 2025, Sardelli is married to Lorraine Sardelli.

== Filmography ==
| Year | Title | Role | Notes |
|---|---|---|---|
| 1963 | Homesick for St. Pauli | Chorus Boy | Uncredited |
| 1970 | Myra Breckinridge | Mario | |
| 1982 | Fake-Out | Danny Parelli | (final film role) |
| 2025 | My Mom Jayne | Himself | |
