= It Will Be Chaos =

- Film release poster
- Directed by: Lorena Luciano, Filippo Piscopo
- Produced by: Lorena Luciano, Filippo Piscopo, Nancy Abraham (Executive Producer for HBO)
- Cinematography: Filippo Piscopo
- Edited by: Lorena Luciano
- Music by: Andrew Byrne, Matthew Rohde
- Production companies: Film2; HBO Documentary Films
- Distributed by: HBO
- Release dates: May 2018 (Seattle); June 18, 2018 (HBO)

It Will Be Chaos is an HBO documentary on the European refugee crisis directed by US-based Italian filmmakers Lorena Luciano and Filippo Piscopo. In 2019 It Will Be Chaos won an Emmy Award for Outstanding Current Affairs documentary at the 40th News & Documentary Emmy Awards. It Will Be Chaos also won the Best Directing Award at the 2018 Taormina Film Festival. Translated into over 10 languages, the documentary has been distributed worldwide.

Other documentary films documenting the European migration crisis include Simshar (2014), Fire at Sea (2016), Human Flow (2017), and Sea Sorrow (2017).

== Summary ==
It Will be Chaos is a documentary about the European refugee crisis, told through the stories of asylum seekers fleeing war and repression. The documentary also interviews local populations left to cope with the overwhelming influx of newcomers while facing their own economic woes.

The film features two stories of refugees on their journeys to the E.U. and it unfolds between Western Europe and the Balkan region. Eritrean refugee Aregai survives the 2013 sinking of a migrant boat off the island of Lampedusa. The final death toll of the shipwreck is never to be known, but 194 bodies were recovered and 368 people were declared missing. After Aregai is rescued by two local fishermen, he finds himself trapped in the broken Italian immigration system and flees underground all the way to Sweden in his quest for political asylum.

The story of Aregai is intercut with the perils of a Syrian family fleeing Damascus in search of safety in Europe. Wael, the head of the family, with his wife Doha, their four young children and three nephews, trek the 2,500-mile Balkan route through border crossings, checkpoints, and refugee detention centers. The family travels the distance learning about the routes thanks to smartphones with GPS and word of mouth tips.

Five years in the making, It Will Be Chaos plunges the audience onto a harrowing road trip through multiple epicenters of the escalating migrant crisis:

- border islands overwhelmed by the influx of asylum seekers such as Lampedusa, headed by Mayor Giusi Nicolini;
- model migrant towns like Riace in the poorest Italian regions where mayors must answer to refugees given the central government's inaction;
- Europe's largest prison-like migrant centers such as Crotone where refugees' frustration erupts into riots;
- humanitarian corridors such as the Balkan route;
- and forgotten corners of major cities like Rome with asylum seekers squatting in crumbling government buildings.

The film documents the rising tension between migrants and locals, as anti-immigrant populism rises all around Europe.

== Screenings ==
It Will Be Chaos has played at film festivals in the US and worldwide, reaching audiences from Europe to Australia.

The film premiered on HBO during the week of World Refugee Day 2018 in the US. It was broadcast in seven continents and translated into over 10 different languages.

The documentary has been incorporated into critical migration discussions among policymakers in Europe. In June 2018, clips from It Will Be Chaos were presented at the public hearing “Addressing Criminalization of Refugees and Impunity of Human Trafficking” at the European Parliament as EU leaders were meeting in Brussels to discuss migration. The screening, organized by EEPA, a Belgian NGO, was aimed at bridging lawmakers with ground-level awareness of the crisis.

The film was shown at several humanitarian organizations’ film screenings spanning from California to Spain, as well as at many universities in the US, Johns Hopkins University and the University of Washington, and abroad.

== Reception ==
It Will Be Chaos has received a 100% rating on Rotten Tomatoes, and positive reviews from major US and international publications.

In the US, the film was reviewed by the Guardian US, the Los Angeles Times, The Hollywood Reporter, and the Boston Globe. The film was also covered by popular radio and podcasts such as Sirius XM's "Stand Up with Pete Dominick" and "Think Again."

In Europe, the film garnered good reviews by several leading media outlets such as La Repubblica, RAI Italian Public TV, and Rolling Stone Italy.

== Awards ==
In 2019 It Will Be Chaos was nominated for the 40th News & Documentary Emmy Awards, and won an Emmy Award for Outstanding Current Affairs documentary.

It Will Be Chaos also won the Best Directing Award at the 2018 Taormina Film Festival and the Humanitarian Award at the Socially Relevant Film Festival New York. It has also been shortlisted for the 2019 David di Donatello Awards.

In July 2018, when Italy's anti-immigrant Interior Minister Matteo Salvini shut ports to refugee rescue ships, It Will Be Chaos won the Best Directing Award at the 64th Taormina Film Festival. The film was the first documentary film to win for Best Directing in the history of the festival. The prize, deliberated by a jury headed by American film producer Martha De Laurentiis, was bestowed to directors Luciano and Piscopo by Academy Award nominee film producer Donatella Palermo. In their acceptance speech for the Taormina Arte Award, Luciano and Piscopo highlighted the coincidence that their refugee film was awarded at the Greek theater in Taormina, itself a historic example of cultural diversity across continents and regions going back many centuries.

== See also ==
- Fire at Sea
- Sea Sorrow
- Human Flow
- Inside Europe: Ten Years of Turmoil
