= I Am Evidence =

American documentary film

- Official poster
- Directed by: Trish Adlesic; Geeta Gandbhir
- Produced by: Mariska Hargitay; Trish Adlesic; Nancy Abraham
- Cinematography: Tony Hardmon
- Edited by: Virdiana Lieberman
- Music by: Wendy Blackstone
- Production companies: HBO Documentary Films; Mighty Entertainment; FixIt Productions; Artemis Rising Foundation
- Distributed by: HBO
- Release dates: April 24, 2017 (Tribeca); April 16, 2018 (United States)
- Running time: 85 minutes
- Country: United States
- Language: English

I Am Evidence is a 2017 American documentary film, directed by Trish Adlesic and Geeta Gandbhir. It focuses on an investigation into thousands upon thousands of rape kits sitting in storage in various police departments being untested. Mariska Hargitay served as a producer on the film.

It had its world premiere at the Tribeca Film Festival on April 24, 2017. It was released on April 16, 2018, by HBO. The film won the News & Documentary Emmy Award for Best Documentary.

== Synopsis ==
The film follows an investigation into the thousands of untested rape kits sitting in storage in various police departments. Each of those untested kits contain crucial evidence without which cases remain unresolved. The film also follows four women, Helena, Amberly, Ericka, and Danielle, whose kits went untested. Kym Worthy and Mariska Hargitay appear in the film as they fight for change.

== Release ==
The film had its world premiere at the Tribeca Film Festival on April 24, 2017. It also screened at AFI Docs on June 15, 2017. It was released on April 16, 2018, by HBO.

== Reception ==
I Am Evidence received positive reviews from film critics. It holds a 100% approval rating on review aggregator website Rotten Tomatoes, based on 14 reviews, with a weighted average of 8.20/10. The site's critical consensus reads, "Eye-opening and deeply disturbing, I Am Evidence sifts through an egregious amount of evidence to craft a powerful documentary about survivors and a very broken system."
