= Michael Stars =

- Industry: Retail, apparel
- Founded: 1986
- Founder: Michael Cohen and Suzanne Lerner
- Headquarters: Hawthorne, California
- Key people: Suzanne Lerner (president)
- Products: T-shirts, sweaters, dresses, leather, and accessories
- Website: Official website

Michael Stars is a Los Angeles–based apparel and lifestyle retail company that offers women's and men's fashion. The company was founded by the married couple Michael Cohen and Suzanne Lerner.

== History ==
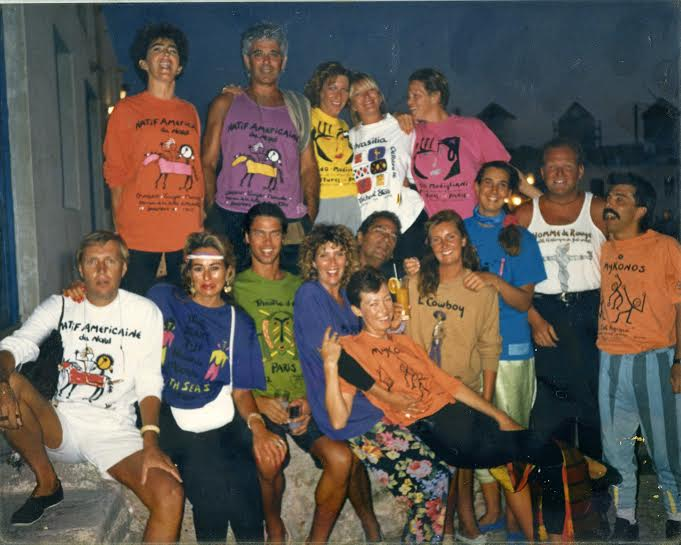
Michael Stars Original T-shirts, Mykonos, July 1989

Co-founder Michael Cohen began his career in the apparel industry in his native country, South Africa, where at the age of 21 he founded the import-export fashion agency Bernstein & Cohen. In 1977, he moved to Los Angeles where he would later meet co-founder Suzanne Lerner. At the time, Lerner was running Lerner et Cie, a wholesale fashion showroom she founded in 1983. Cohen was working with contemporary artist John Stars and placing his designs on t-shirts. Cohen approached Lerner about developing a brand, and in 1986 the two of them launched Michael Stars. Two years later, Cohen and Lerner were married.

In the beginning, Michael Stars focused on unisex, one-size-fits-all t-shirts. The original designs were boxy and decorated in bright colors and interwoven, French-inspired graphics. The company introduced fitted shapes, cap sleeves, and other alternative silhouettes for T-shirts during the late 1980s. Michael Stars products appeared on television programs including Beverly Hills, 90210. At the time the shirts appeared on the show, they were being sold at upscale retailers such as Barneys, Fred Segal and Harrods.

=== Lifestyle brand ===
Over the next two decades, Michael Stars expanded from a T-shirt manufacturer into a broader lifestyle apparel brand. In July 2013, Michael Stars launched its first full women's fashion collection with 160 pieces. In September 2014, the brand added its first ever men's line, a collection of 34 men's basics, which was described by industry publications as having "a modern, technical edge."

The label is sold at its own branded retail stores, department stores including Bloomingdale's and Neiman Marcus, and at about a thousand specialty stores across the US. In May 2014 the company introduced its Curbside Boutique, a 16-foot truck refurbished as a boutique on wheels. The mobile store first toured New York City before moving to Southern California. The brand currently has twelve retail store locations, including its flagship store in West Hollywood. The company continues to manufacture its entire t-shirt and activewear line in Los Angeles.

The brand's products have been worn by celebrities including Jessica Alba, Sarah Jessica Parker, Olivia Wilde, Maria Bello, Halle Berry, January Jones, Emmy Rossum and Jessica Biel, and is regularly featured in magazines like Vogue, Harper's Bazaar, Lucky, Elle and InStyle.

In January 2015, after nearly thirty years as president, Michael Cohen stepped down as the head of the company before dying in March of the same year from prostate cancer.

== Charity work ==
Cohen and Lerner formed the Michael Stars Foundation in 2005. The foundation has supported organizations including The Joyful Heart Foundation, We Advance, Children Mending Hearts, Ms. Foundation, and Women Thrive Worldwide, among others. Over the years the brand has also created shirts to benefit organizations such as UNICEF, Hurricane Katrina, and the American Heart Association. In April 2015, the company launched the Artisan Collection, a collaboration with Paula Coles designed to help support both local Haitian artisans and education in Haiti through Prodev schools.
