= My Mom Jayne =

2025 documentary film by Mariska Hargitay

- Promotional poster
- Directed by: Mariska Hargitay
- Produced by: Mariska Hargitay; Trish Adlesic
- Cinematography: Tony Hardmon
- Edited by: JD Marlow
- Music by: Max Avery Lichtenstein
- Production companies: HBO Documentary Films; Mighty Entertainment
- Distributed by: HBO
- Release dates: May 17, 2025 (Cannes); June 20, 2025 (United States)
- Running time: 106 minutes
- Country: United States

My Mom Jayne is a 2025 documentary film directed by Mariska Hargitay. The film examines the life of Hargitay's late mother, Jayne Mansfield. The film had its world premiere in the Cannes Classics section of the 78th Cannes Film Festival on May 17, 2025, where it was nominated for the L'Œil d'or. It received a limited theatrical release on June 20, 2025, and was released on HBO and HBO Max on June 27, 2025.

== Production ==
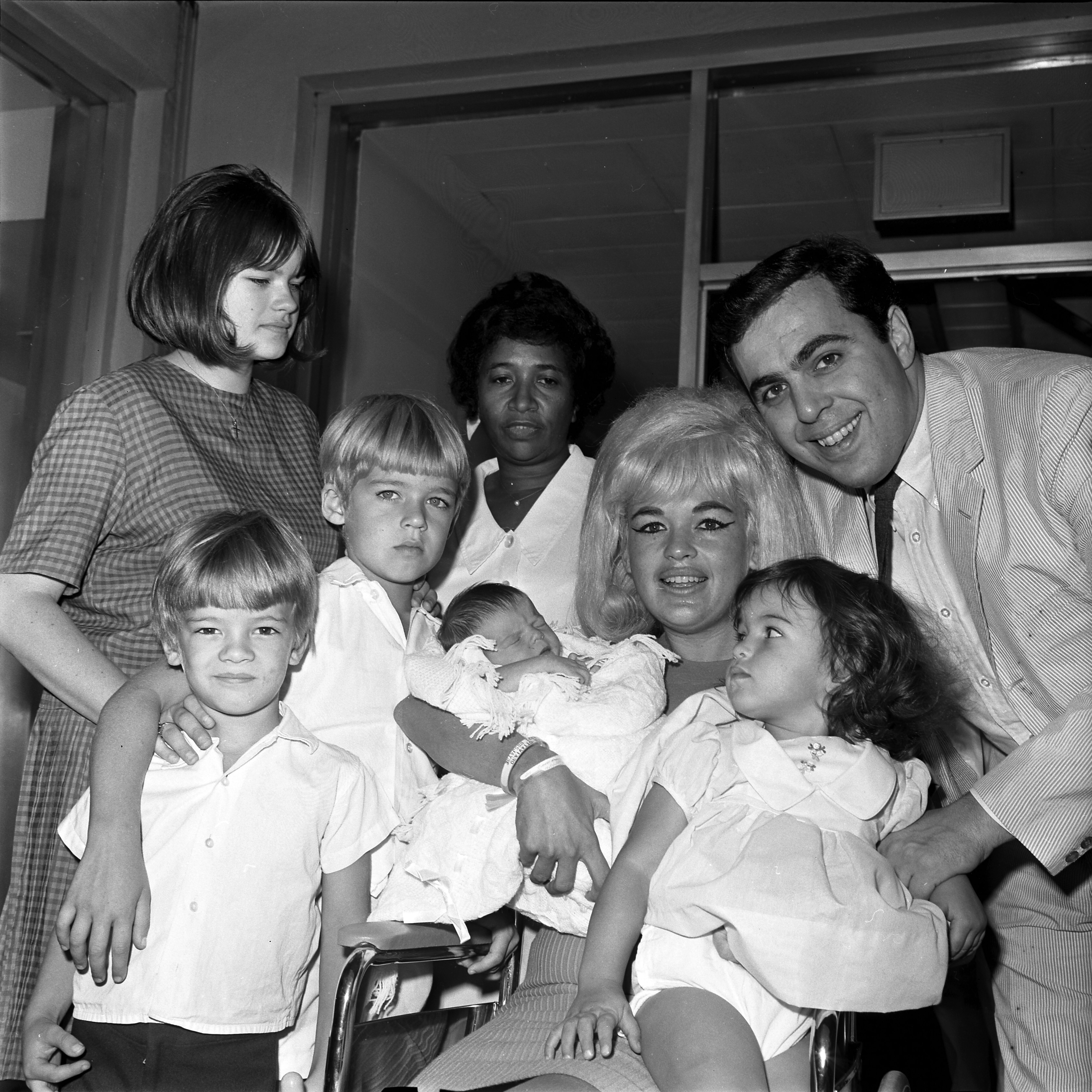
Jayne Mansfield and her family in 1965, including daughter Mariska Hargitay

Director Mariska Hargitay was only three years old when her mother, actress Jayne Mansfield, died in a car accident. Hargitay stated, "This movie is a labor of love and longing. It's a search for the mother I never knew, an integration of a part of myself I'd never owned, and a reclaiming of my mother's story and my own truth." While her family was initially hesitant about her choice to make the documentary, they gave their blessing and agreed to appear in the film. In the documentary, Hargitay also went public with the story of her biological father, Nelson Sardelli.

== Release ==
The film was announced on April 8, 2025. It premiered in the Cannes Classics section of the 78th Cannes Film Festival on May 17, 2025.

It screened at the Tribeca Festival from June 13 to 15, 2025, and received a limited theatrical release on June 20, 2025 through which it qualified for consideration for an Oscar nomination. It was released on HBO, as well as HBO's streaming service HBO Max, on June 27, 2025.

== Reception ==
On the review aggregator website Rotten Tomatoes, 100% of 37 critics' reviews are positive. Metacritic, which uses a weighted average, assigned the film a score of 75 out of 100, based on seven critics, indicating "generally favorable" reviews.

=== Accolades ===
| Award | Date of ceremony | Category | Recipient(s) | Result | Ref. |
|---|---|---|---|---|---|
| AARP Movies for Grownups Awards | January 10, 2026 | Best Documentary | My Mom Jayne | Won | |
| Astra Film Awards | January 9, 2026 | Best Documentary Feature | My Mom Jayne | Nominated | |
| Astra TV Awards | August 15, 2026 | Best Documentary TV Movie | My Mom Jayne | Nominated | |
| Cannes Film Festival | May 24, 2025 | L'Œil d'or | My Mom Jayne | Nominated | |
| Cinema Eye Honors | January 8, 2026 | Outstanding Broadcast Film | My Mom Jayne | Nominated | |
| Critics' Choice Documentary Awards | November 9, 2025 | Best First Documentary Feature | My Mom Jayne | Won | |
| Critics' Choice Documentary Awards | November 9, 2025 | Best Biographical Documentary | My Mom Jayne | Nominated | |
| Primetime Emmy Awards | September 5–6, 2026 | Outstanding Documentary or Nonfiction Special | Mariska Hargitay, Trish Adlesic, Nancy Abraham, Lisa Heller, Lauran Bromley, Anna Klein, and Steven Bennett | Won | |
| Primetime Emmy Awards | September 5–6, 2026 | Outstanding Directing for a Documentary/Nonfiction Program | Mariska Hargitay | Won | |
| Primetime Emmy Awards | September 5–6, 2026 | Outstanding Cinematography for a Nonfiction Program | Tony Hardmon | Nominated | |
| Producers Guild of America Awards | February 28, 2026 | Outstanding Producer of Documentary Theatrical Motion Pictures | Mariska Hargitay and Trish Adlesic | Won | |
