= Primetime Emmy Award for Outstanding Documentary or Nonfiction Special =

American television award

- Awarded for: Outstanding Documentary or Nonfiction Special
- Country: United States
- Presented by: Academy of Television Arts & Sciences
- First award: 1998
- Currently held by: My Mom Jayne: A Film by Mariska Hargitay (2026)
- Website: emmys.com

The Primetime Emmy Award for Outstanding Documentary or Nonfiction Special is handed out annually at the Creative Arts Emmy Award ceremony. The category was called Outstanding Nonfiction Special prior to 2013 and Outstanding Informational Special before 1998.

== Winners and nominations ==
=== 1990s ===
Year	Program	Producers	Network
1998 (50th)
1998 (50th)	Vietnam POWs: Stories of Survival	Bob Reid, executive producer; Jacinda A. Davis, coordinating producer; Brian Leonard, producer/director/writer	Discovery
1998 (50th)	Dead Blue: Surviving Depression	Sheila Nevins, executive producer; Nancy Abraham, supervising producer; John Parsons Peditto, Sara M. Chereskin and Blanka Nedela, producers; Eames Yates, director	HBO
1998 (50th)	Don Hewitt: 90 Minutes on 60 Minutes (American Masters)	Susan Lacy, executive producer; Susan Steinberg, producer/director; Tamar Hacker, senior producer	PBS
1998 (50th)	4 Little Girls	Sheila Nevins, executive producer; Spike Lee, producer/director; Samuel D. Pollard, producer; Jacqueline Glover, coordinating producer; Daphne McWilliams, line producer	HBO
1998 (50th)	Wolves at Our Door	Gaynelle Evans, executive producer; Jim Dutcher, producer; Mose Richards, writer	Discovery
1999 (51st)
1999 (51st)	Thug Life in D.C.	Sheila Nevins, executive producer; Nancy Abraham, supervising producer; Marc Levin, producer/director; Daphne Pinkerson, producer	HBO
1999 (51st)	Avalanche: The White Death	Barry Nye, producer/director; Nicolas Noxon, producer; Steven Reich, writer	NBC
1999 (51st)	Dying to Tell the Story	Kathy Eldon, executive producer; Jacoba Atlas, supervising producer; Kyra Thompson, producer/writer/director; Victoria Waldock, producer	TBS
1999 (51st)	The Farm: Angola, USA	Michael Cascio, executive producer; Gayle Gilman, supervising producer; Jonathan Stack and Liz Garbus, producers	A&E
1999 (51st)	Lenny Bruce: Swear to Tell the Truth	Sheila Nevins, executive producer; Anthony Stanislas Radziwill, executive producer; Robert B. Weide, producer/director/writer	HBO
1999 (51st)	Little Dieter Needs to Fly (Cinemax Reel Life)	Sheila Nevins, executive producer; Nancy Abraham, supervising producer; Werner Herzog, producer/writer/director; Lucki Stipetić and Andre Singer, producers	Cinemax

=== 2000s ===
Year	Program	Producers	Network
2000 (52nd)
2000 (52nd)	Children in War	Sheila Nevins, executive producer; John Hoffman, supervising producer; Alan Raymond and Susan Raymond, producers/writers/directors	HBO
2000 (52nd)	American Hollow	Sheila Nevins, executive producer; Jacqueline Glover, supervising producer; Rory Kennedy, producer/director	HBO
2000 (52nd)	Cancer: Evolution to Revolution	Anthony Stanislas Radziwill, Kenneth Paul Rosenberg and Sheila Nevins, executive producers; John Hoffman, supervising producer; Joseph F. Lovett, producer/writer/director	HBO
2000 (52nd)	Paradise Lost 2: Revelations	Sheila Nevins, executive producer; Nancy Abraham, supervising producer; Joe Berlinger and Bruce Sinofsky, producers/directors	HBO
2000 (52nd)	Raising the Mammoth	Maurice Paleau, executive producer; Adrienne Ciuffo, producer/writer; Jean-Charles Deniau, director	Discovery
2001 (53rd)
2001 (53rd)	Scottsboro: An American Tragedy (American Experience)	Margaret Drain, executive producer; Mark Samels, supervising producer; Barak Goodman, producer/director/writer; Daniel Anker, producer/co-director	PBS
2001 (53rd)	Dwarfs: Not a Fairy Tale (America Undercover)	Sheila Nevins, executive producer; Nancy Abraham, supervising producer; Lisa Abelow Hedley and Bonnie Strauss, producers/directors	HBO
2001 (53rd)	Egypt Beyond the Pyramids	Nancy Dubuc, Craig Haffner and Donna E. Lusitana, executive producers; Raymond Bridgers, supervising producer; David de Vries, producer/director/writer; Peter Woodward, host	History
2001 (53rd)	Half Past Autumn: The Life and Works of Gordon Parks	Craig Laurence Rice, executive producer/director; Cecil Cox and Sheila Nevins, executive producers; Jacqueline Glover and Lisa Heller, supervising producers; St. Clair Bourne and Denzel Washington, producers; Lou Potter, writer	HBO
2001 (53rd)	Living Dolls: The Making of a Child Beauty Queen	Sheila Nevins, executive producer; Nancy Abraha, supervising producer; Shari Cookson, producer/director/writer; Linda Otto and Jean Guest, producers	HBO
2002 (54th)
2002 (54th)	9/11	Jules Naudet, Gédéon Naudet and James Hanlon, executive producers/directors; Susan Zirinsky, Graydon Carter and David Friend, executive producers; Hal Gessner, supervising producer; Tom Forman, senior producer/writer; Richard Barber, Michael Maloy, Bruce Spiegel, Mead Stone and Paul Larossa, producers; Rob Klug, director; Greg Kandra, writer	CBS
2002 (54th)	The Human Face with John Cleese	Michael Mosley, Nicholas Rossiter and Nancy Lavin, executive producers; Sally George and Sharon Gillooly, producers; James Erskine and David Stewart, producers/directors; John Cleese, writer/host	TLC
2002 (54th)	In Memoriam: New York City	Jon Liebman and Peter W. Kunhardt, executive producers; Dyllan McGee, supervising producer; Lisa Heller, senior producer; John Hoffman, Sheila Nevins and Brad Grey, producers	HBO
2002 (54th)	Inside the Actors Studio: 100th Guest Special	James Lipton, executive producer/writer/host; Christian Barcellos and Frances Berwick, executive producers for Bravo; Michael Kostel and John Servidio, producers; Jeff Wurtz, director	Bravo
2002 (54th)	We Stand Alone Together: The Men of Easy Company	Tom Hanks and Steven Spielberg, executive producers; Gary Goetzman and Tony To, co-executive producers; Mark Cowen, producer/director; William Richter, producer/writer	HBO
2003 (55th)
2003 (55th)	Benjamin Franklin	Catherine Allan, executive producer; Ellen Hovde and Muffie Meyer, producers	PBS
2003 (55th)	Christopher Reeve: Courageous Steps	Rudy Bednar and Alastair Waddington, executive producers; Stuart Watts and Ian A. Hunt, producers; Christopher Reeve, narrator	ABC
2003 (55th)	The Day the Towers Fell	Lou Reda, executive producer; Dolores Gavin, supervising producer; Sammy Jackson, producer	History
2003 (55th)	Journeys with George	Sheila Nevins, executive producer; Julie Anderson, supervising producer; Alexandra Pelosi, producer	HBO
2003 (55th)	Unchained Memories: Readings from the Slave Narratives	Sheila Nevins and Donna Brown Guillaume, executive producers; Lisa Heller, senior producer; Jacqueline Glover and Thomas Lennon, producers	HBO
2004 (56th)
2004 (56th)	The Forgetting: A Portrait of Alzheimer's	Naomi S. Boak, executive producer; Elizabeth Arledge, producer	PBS
2004 (56th)	AFI's 100 Years...100 Heroes & Villains	Gary Smith and Dann Netter, executive producers; Frederick S. Pierce, executive producer for AFI; Bob Gazzale, producer	CBS
2004 (56th)	Born Rich	Sheila Nevins, executive producer; Dirk Wittenborn, produced by; Jamie Johnson, producer	HBO
2004 (56th)	A Decade Under the Influence	Alison Palmer Bourke, Caroline Kaplan and Jonathan Sehring, executive producers; Gini Reticker, Jerry Kupfer, Richard LaGravenese and Ted Demme, producers	IFC
2004 (56th)	Fred Rogers: America's Favorite Neighbor	Jocelyn Hough, executive producer; William H. Isler and Robert F. Petrilli, co-executive producers; Margaret Whitmer, Joseph J. Kennedy IV and Rick Sebak, producers; Michael Keaton, host	PBS
2005 (57th)
2005 (57th)	Unforgivable Blackness: The Rise and Fall of Jack Johnson	David Schaye, Paul Barnes and Ken Burns, producers	PBS
2005 (57th)	Beyond the Da Vinci Code	Margaret Kim, Robb Weller, Gary Grossman and Steve Lange, executive producers; Thomas Quinn, supervising producer; Rob Blumenstein, producer	History
2005 (57th)	Cary Grant: A Class Apart (American Masters)	Tom Brown, executive producer for TCM; Roger Mayer and George Feltenstein, executive producers for Turner; Melissa Roller, supervising producer for TCM; Robert Trachtenberg, producer	TCM
2005 (57th)	Inside the Actors Studio: 10th Anniversary Special	James Lipton, executive producer/host; Frances Berwick and Christian Barcellos, executive producers for Bravo; Alice Siess, producer	Bravo
2005 (57th)	Live from New York: The First 5 Years of Saturday Night Live	Ken Aymong and Rachel Talbot, supervising producers; Kenneth Bowser, produced by	NBC
2006 (58th)
2006 (58th)	Rome: Engineering an Empire	Dolores Gavin, Vincent Kralyevich, Bill Hunt and Kristine Sabat, executive producers; Christopher Cassel, producer	History
2006 (58th)	All Aboard! Rosie's Family Cruise	Sheila Nevins, Kelli O'Donnell and Rosie O'Donnell, executive producers; John Hoffman, producer; Shari Cookson, produced by	HBO
2006 (58th)	How William Shatner Changed the World	Susan Werbe, Alan Handel and Malcolm Clark, executive producers	History
2006 (58th)	Inside 9/11	Jonathan Towers and Michael Cascio, executive producers; Nicole Rittenmeyer and Colette Beaudry, supervising producers; Bernard Dudek, Rachel Milton, Lance Hori and Alex Flaster, producers	Nat Geo
2006 (58th)	Stardust: The Bette Davis Story	Tom Brown, George Feltenstein and Roger Mayer, executive producers; Brian Tessier and Melissa Roller, supervising producers; Peter Jones, producer	TCM
2007 (59th)
2007 (59th)	Ghosts of Abu Ghraib	Diana Barrett and Sheila Nevins, executive producers; Nancy Abraham, senior producer; Rory Kennedy, Liz Garbus and Jack Youngelson, producers	HBO
2007 (59th)	AFI's 100 Years…100 Cheers: America's Most Inspiring Movies	Gary Smith, executive producer; Frederick S. Pierce, executive producer for AFI; Dann Netter and Bob Gazzale, producers	CBS
2007 (59th)	Blood Diamonds	Margaret Kim and Bill Brummel, executive producers; June Molgaard, producer	History
2007 (59th)	Brando	Tom Brown, executive producer; Melissa Roller, supervising producer; Leslie Greif, Mimi Freedman and Joanne Rubino, producers	TCM
2007 (59th)	Star Wars: The Legacy Revealed	Kevin Burns, executive producer; Beth Dietrich, executive producer for History; Jim Ward and Tom Warner, executive producers for Lucasfilm; Kim Sheerin and Scott Hartford, co-executive producers; Steven Smith and David Comtois, producers	History
2008 (60th)
2008 (60th)	Autism: The Musical	Jonathan Murray, Janet Grillo and Kristen Stills, executive producers; Nancy Abraham, senior producer; Perrin Chiles, Tricia Regan and Sasha Alpert, producers	HBO
2008 (60th)	AFI's 100 Years...100 Movies (10th Anniversary Edition)	Gary Smith, executive producer; Frederick S. Pierce, executive producer for AFI; Dann Netter and Bob Gazzale, producers	CBS
2008 (60th)	Alive Day Memories: Home from Iraq	Sheila Nevins and James Gandolfini, executive producers; Alexandra E. Ryan, co-executive producer; Sara Bernstein, supervising producer; Ellen Goosenberg Kent, Jon Alpert and Matthew O'Neill, produced by	HBO
2008 (60th)	Pioneers of Television: "Late Night: Johnny, Jack, Steve, and Merv"	Steve Boettcher and Mike Trinklein, producers	PBS
2008 (60th)	The Pixar Story	Leslie Iwerks, producer	Starz
2009 (61st)
2009 (61st)	102 Minutes That Changed America	Greg Jacobs, Jon Siskel and Susan Werbe, executive producers; Nicole Rittenmeyer, producer	History
2009 (61st)	The Alzheimer's Project: Momentum in Science	Sheila Nevins and Maria Shriver, executive producers; John Hoffman, series producer/produced by; Susan Froemke, produced by	HBO
2009 (61st)	Farrah's Story	Farrah Fawcett and Craig J. Nevius, executive producers; Alexandra Gleysteen, executive producer for NBC; Robert Dean, producer for NBC; Alana Stewart, produced by	NBC
2009 (61st)	Michael J. Fox: Adventures of an Incurable Optimist	Michael J. Fox, Nelle Fortenberry and Rudy Bednar, executive producers; Ann Reynolds, senior producer; Mary Hanan, producer	ABC
2009 (61st)	Roman Polanski: Wanted and Desired	Steven Soderbergh and Randy Wooten, executive producers; Jeffrey Kusama-Hinte, Lila Yacoub and Marina Zenovich, produced by	HBO

=== 2010s ===
Year	Program	Producers	Network
2010 (62nd)
2010 (62nd)	Teddy: In His Own Words	Dyllan McGee, executive producer; Jacqueline Glover, supervising producer; Peter W. Kunhardt and Sheila Nevins, produced by	HBO
2010 (62nd)	Believe: The Eddie Izzard Story	Max Burgos and John Gore, executive producers; James Goddard and Sarah Townsend, producers	Epix
2010 (62nd)	By the People: The Election of Barack Obama	Amy Rice, Alicia Sams, Edward Norton, Stuart Blumberg and Bill Migliore, produced by	HBO
2010 (62nd)	Johnny Mercer: The Dream's on Me	Clint Eastwood, executive producer; Bruce Ricker, produced by	TCM
2010 (62nd)	Saturday Night Live in the 2000s: Time and Again	Ken Aymong, supervising producer; Kenneth Bowser and Declan Baldwin, produced by	NBC
2010 (62nd)	The Simpsons 20th Anniversary Special – In 3-D! On Ice!	Morgan Spurlock and Jeremy Chilnick, executive producers	Fox
2011 (63rd)
2011 (63rd)	Gettysburg	Ridley Scott and Tony Scott, Mary Lisio, Mark Herzog, executive producers; David McKillop, Mary E. Donahue and Julian Hobbs, executive producers for History; Ben Fox, supervising producer; Christopher G. Cowen, producer	History
2011 (63rd)	Becoming Chaz	Fenton Bailey and Randy Barbato, produced by; Chaz Bono, producer	OWN
2011 (63rd)	His Way	Steven Soderbergh and Audrey Rosenberg, executive producers; Graydon Carter, Alan Polsky and Gabe Polsky, produced by	HBO
2011 (63rd)	Jaws: The Inside Story	Thomas Moody and Peter Tarshis, executive producers for Bio; Kevin Bachar, executive producer for Pangolin Pictures; Amelia Hanibelsz, supervising producer; Georgia Manukas, producer	Bio
2011 (63rd)	Stand Up to Cancer	Laura Ziskin and Pamela Oas Williams, executive producers; Michael B. Seligman, supervising producer	ABC / CBS / NBC
2012 (64th)
2012 (64th)	George Harrison: Living in the Material World	Margaret Bodde, executive producer; Emma Tillinger Koskoff, executive producer for Sikelia Productions; Blair Foster, supervising producer; Olivia Harrison, Nigel Sinclair and Martin Scorsese, produced by	HBO
2012 (64th)	Bobby Fischer Against the World	Sheila Nevins and Dan Cogan, executive producers; Liz Garbus, Stanley F. Buchthal, Rory Kennedy and Matthew Justus, producers; Nancy Abraham, senior producer	HBO
2012 (64th)	Gloria: In Her Own Words	Dyllan McGee, executive producer; Jacqueline Glover, supervising producer; Peter W. Kunhardt and Sheila Nevins, producers	HBO
2012 (64th)	Paul Simon's Graceland Journey: Under African Skies	Molly Thompson, David McKillop, Robert DeBitetto and Eddie Simon, executive producers; Jon Kamen, Justin Wilkes and, Joe Berlinger, producers	A&E
2012 (64th)	6 Days to Air: The Making of South Park	Arthur Bradford, executive producer; Jennifer Ollman, supervising producer	Comedy Central
2013 (65th)
2013 (65th)	Manhunt: The Inside Story of the Hunt for Bin Laden	Sheila Nevins, executive producer; Nancy Abraham, senior producer; John Battsek, Julie Goldman and Greg Barker, produced by	HBO
2013 (65th)	All the President's Men Revisited	Robert Redford, Andrew Lack, Laura Michalchyshyn, Nancy Daniels and Denise Contis, executive producers; Peter Schnall, producer	Discovery
2013 (65th)	Crossfire Hurricane	Mick Jagger and Victoria Pearman, produced by	HBO
2013 (65th)	Death and the Civil War (American Experience)	Mark Samels, executive producer; Sharon Grimberg, senior producer; Ric Burns, Robin Espinola and Bonnie Lafave, produced by	PBS
2013 (65th)	Ethel	Sheila Nevins, executive producer; Nancy Abraham, senior producer; Rory Kennedy and Jack Youngelson, producers	HBO
2014 (66th)
2014 (66th)	JFK (American Experience)	Mark Samels, executive producer; Sharon Grimberg, senior producer; Susan Bellows, produced by	PBS
2014 (66th)	Moms Mabley: I Got Somethin' to Tell You	Whoopi Goldberg and Tom Leonardis, executive producer/produced by; George Schlatter, executive producer	HBO
2014 (66th)	Paycheck to Paycheck: The Life and Times of Katrina Gilbert	Sheila Nevins and Maria Shriver, executive producers; Nancy Abraham, senior producer; Sascha Weiss, producer; Shari Cookson and Nick Doob, produced by	HBO
2014 (66th)	Running from Crazy	Erica Forstadt, Mariel Hemingway, Lisa Erspamer and Oprah Winfrey, executive producers; Barbara Kopple, executive producer/produced by; David Cassidy, produced by	OWN
2014 (66th)	The Sixties: The Assassination of President Kennedy	Tom Hanks, Gary Goetzman and Mark Herzog, executive producers; Christopher G. Cowen and Kirk Saduski, co-executive producers; Jonathan Buss and Stephen J. Morrison, producers	CNN
2014 (66th)	The Square	Jodie Evans, Lekha Singh, Sarah E. Johnson, Mike Lerner and Gavin Dougan, executive producers; Karim Amer and Jehane Noujaim, produced by	Netflix
2015 (67th)
2015 (67th)	Going Clear: Scientology and the Prison of Belief	Chris Wilson and Sheila Nevins, executive producers; Sara Bernstein, supervising producer; Alex Gibney, Lawrence Wright and Kristen Vaurio, producers	HBO
2015 (67th)	The Case Against 8	Sheila Nevins, executive producer; Sara Bernstein, supervising producer; Ben Cotner and Ryan White, produced by	HBO
2015 (67th)	Cobain: Montage of Heck	Frances Bean Cobain, David Byrnes, Lawrence Mestel and Sheila Nevins, executive producers; Sara Bernstein, senior producer; Brett Morgen and Danielle Renfrew, produced by	HBO
2015 (67th)	Sinatra: All or Nothing at All	Frank Marshall, Blair Foster, Alex Gibney, Sharon Hall, Andrew Kosove, Broderick Johnson and Charles Pignone, executive producers; Jeffrey Pollack, Erin Edeiken and Samuel D. Pollard, producers	HBO
2015 (67th)	Virunga	Leonardo DiCaprio, Howard G. Buffett, Maxyne Franklin, Jess Search and Jon Drever, executive producers; Orlando von Einsiedel and Joanna Natasegara, producers	Netflix
2016 (68th)
2016 (68th)	What Happened, Miss Simone?	Sidney Beaumont, executive producer; Amy Hobby, Liz Garbus, Justin Wilkes and Jayson Jackson, producers	Netflix
2016 (68th)	Becoming Mike Nichols	Frank Rich, Jack O'Brien, Douglas McGrath and Sheila Nevins, executive producers; Lisa Heller, supervising producer; Ellin Baumel, produced by	HBO
2016 (68th)	Everything Is Copy – Nora Ephron: Scripted & Unscripted	Graydon Carter, Annabelle Dunne and Sheila Nevins, executive producers; Lisa Heller, supervising producer; Carly Hugo and Matt Parker, produced by	HBO
2016 (68th)	Listen to Me Marlon	Andrew Ruhemann, executive producer; John Battsek, R. J. Cutler and George Chignell, produced by	Showtime
2016 (68th)	Mapplethorpe: Look at the Pictures	Sheila Nevins, executive producer; Sara Bernstein, senior producer; Fenton Bailey, Randy Barbato, Katharina Otto-Bernstein and Mona Card, produced by	HBO
2017 (69th)
2017 (69th)	13th	Angus Wall and Jason Sterman, executive producers; Spencer Averick, producer; Ava DuVernay and Howard Barish, produced by	Netflix
2017 (69th)	Amanda Knox	Mette Heide, executive producer/produced by; Rod Blackhurst, Brian McGinn and Stephen Robert Morse, produced by	Netflix
2017 (69th)	The Beatles: Eight Days a Week – The Touring Years	Nigel Sinclair, Scott Pascucci, Brian Grazer, Ron Howard, producers; Jeff Jones, Jonathan Clyde, Michael Rosenberg, executive producers	Hulu
2017 (69th)	L.A. Burning: The Riots 25 Years Later	Tara Long, Mark Ford, Kevin Lopez, John Singleton, Brad Abramson and Shelly Tatro, executive producers; One9 and Erik Parker, co-executive producers; Nora Donaghy, producer	A&E
2017 (69th)	A House Divided (Vice Special Report)	Shane Smith, Josh Tyrangiel, Jonah Kaplan and Tim Clancy, executive producers; Beverly Chase and David Schankula, supervising producers; Alex Chitty and Jane Kozlowski, produced by	HBO
2018 (70th)
2018 (70th)	The Zen Diaries of Garry Shandling	Judd Apatow and Sheila Nevins, executive producers; Joe Beshenkovsky, and Michael Bonfiglio, co-executive producers; Sara Bernstein and Josh Church, supervising producers; Sam Fishell and Amanda Glaze, producers	HBO
2018 (70th)	Icarus	Bryan Fogel, Dan Cogan, David Fialkow and Jim Swartz, produced by	Netflix
2018 (70th)	Jim & Andy: The Great Beyond – Featuring a Very Special, Contractually Obligated Mention of Tony Clifton	Shane Smith, Eddy Moretti, Nicole Montez and Tony Clifton, executive producers; Spike Jonze, Danny Gabai and Chris Smith, produced by	Netflix
2018 (70th)	Mister Rogers: It's You I Like	Ellen Doherty and Kevin Morrison, executive producers; JoAnn Young and John Paulson, produced by	PBS
2018 (70th)	Spielberg	Susan Lacy, Jessica Levin and Emma Pildes, produced by	HBO
2019 (71st)
2019 (71st)	Leaving Neverland	Dan Reed, produced by; Nancy Abraham and Lisa Heller, executive producers	HBO
2019 (71st)	Fyre: The Greatest Party That Never Happened	Danny Gabai, Chris Smith and Mick Purzycki, producers; Gabrielle Bluestone, executive producer	Netflix
2019 (71st)	The Inventor: Out for Blood in Silicon Valley	Alex Gibney, Erin Edeiken and Jessie Deeter, produced by; Nancy Abraham, Sara Bernstein and Graydon Carter, executive producers; Stacey Offman, co-executive producer	HBO
2019 (71st)	Jane Fonda in Five Acts	Susan Lacy, Jessica Levin and Emma Pildes, produced by	HBO
2019 (71st)	Love, Gilda	Lisa D'Apolito, James Tumminia, Bronwyn Berry and Meryl Goldsmith, produced by; Alan Zweibel, Amy Entelis and Courtney Sexton, executive producers	CNN
2019 (71st)	Minding the Gap	Diane Quon and Bing Liu, produced by; Gordon Quinn, Steve James, Sally Jo Fifer, Justine Nagan and Chris White, executive producers	Hulu

=== 2020s ===
Year	Program	Producers	Network
2020 (72nd)
2020 (72nd)	The Apollo	Lisa Cortés, Jeanne Elfant Festa, Cassidy Hartmann and Roger Ross Williams, produced by; Dan Cogan, Nicholas Ferrall and Julie Goldman, executive producers	HBO
2020 (72nd)	Beastie Boys Story	Jason Baum, Amanda Adelson and Spike Jonze, produced by; Mike Diamond, Adam Horovitz, Dechen Wangdu-Yauch and John Silva, executive producers	Apple TV+
2020 (72nd)	Becoming	Lauren Cioffi, producer; Katy Chevigny and Marilyn Ness, produced by; Priya Swaminathan and Tonia Davis, executive producers	Netflix
2020 (72nd)	The Great Hack	Judy Korin, Pedro Kos, Karim Amer and Geralyn White Dreyfous, produced by; Nina Fialkow, Lyn Davis Lear and Mike Lerner, executive producers	Netflix
2020 (72nd)	Laurel Canyon: A Place in Time	Erin Edeiken and Ryan Suffern, produced by; Frank Marshall, Alex Gibney, Stacey Offman, Richard Perello and Jeff Pollack, executive producers	Epix
2021 (73rd)
2021 (73rd)	Boys State	Davis Guggenheim, Laurene Powell Jobs, Jonathan Silberberg and Nicole Stott, executive producers; Shannon Dill, co-executive producer; Amanda McBaine and Jesse Moss, producers	Apple TV+
2021 (73rd)	The Bee Gees: How Can You Mend a Broken Heart	David Blackman, Nicholas Ferrall and Jody Gerson, executive producers; Jeanne Elfant Festa, Mark Monroe and Frank Marshall, produced by; Aly Parker, supervising producer	HBO
2021 (73rd)	Framing Britney Spears (The New York Times Presents)	Ken Druckerman, Stephanie Preiss, Mary Robertson and Banks Tarver, executive producers; Liz Day, co-executive producer; Samantha Stark and Liz Hodes, producers	FX
2021 (73rd)	The Social Dilemma	Larissa Rhodes, produced by; Daniel Wright and Stacey Piculell, supervising producers	Netflix
2021 (73rd)	Tina	Nancy Abraham, Erwin Bach, Lisa Heller and Tali Pelman, executive producers; Simon Chinn and Jonathan Chinn, produced by; Diane Becker, producer	HBO
2022 (74th)
2022 (74th)	George Carlin's American Dream	Teddy Leifer, Judd Apatow, Michael Bonfiglio and Kelly Carlin, executive producers; Joe Beshenkovsky, co-executive producer; Amanda Glaze, supervising producer; Wayne Federman, producer	HBO
2022 (74th)	Controlling Britney Spears (New York Times Presents)	Mary Robertson, Ken Druckerman and Banks Tarver, executive producers; Liz Day, supervising producer; Samantha Stark and Timothy Moran, producers	FX
2022 (74th)	Lucy and Desi	Michael Rosenberg, Justin Wilkes, Jeanne Elfant Festa, Nigel Sinclair, Amy Poehler and Mark Monroe, produced by	Prime Video
2022 (74th)	The Tinder Swindler	Bart Layton, Sam Starbuck, Jeff Gaspin, Eric Levy, Stuart Ford and Lourdes Diaz, executive producers; Bernadette Higgins, producer	Netflix
2022 (74th)	We Feed People	Carolyn Bernstein, executive producer; Brian Grazer, Ron Howard, Sara Bernstein, Justin Wilkes, Meredith Kaulfers and Walter Matteson, produced by	Disney+
2023 (75th)
2023 (75th)	Still: A Michael J. Fox Movie	Nelle Fortenberry, Laurene Powell Jobs and Nicole Stott, executive producers; Davis Guggenheim, Annetta Marion, Jonathan King and Will Cohen, produced by	Apple TV+
2023 (75th)	Being Mary Tyler Moore	Ben Selkow, James Adolphus, Lena Waithe, Rishi Rajani, Debra Martin Chase, Andrew C. Coles and Laura Gardner, produced by	HBO
2023 (75th)	Judy Blume Forever	Meredith Kaulfers, executive producer; Sara Bernstein, Justin Wilkes, Davina Pardo, Leah Wolchok and Marcella Steingart, produced by	Prime Video
2023 (75th)	My Transparent Life	Serena De Comarmond, executive producer; Evan Jenkins, producer	Prime Video
2023 (75th)	Pamela, a Love Story	Jessica Hargrave, Ryan White, Julia Nottingham and Brandon Thomas Lee, producers; Josh Braun, executive producer	Netflix
2024 (76th)
2024 (76th)	Jim Henson Idea Man	Brian Grazer, Ron Howard, Sara Bernstein, Margaret Bodde, Justin Wilkes, Mark Monroe and Christopher St. John, produced by	Disney+
2024 (76th)	Albert Brooks: Defending My Life	Rob Reiner, Michele Singer Reiner and Matthew George, produced by	HBO
2024 (76th)	Girls State	Nicole Stott, Jonathan Silberberg, Davis Guggenheim and Laurene Powell Jobs, executive producers; Amanda McBaine and Jesse Moss, produced by	Apple TV+
2024 (76th)	The Greatest Night in Pop	Amit Dey, executive producer; Larry Klein, Harriet Sternberg, Lionel Richie, Bruce Eskowitz and George Hencken, producers; Julia Nottingham, produced by	Netflix
2024 (76th)	Steve! (Martin) A Documentary in 2 Pieces	Caitrin Rogers, Ben Cotner and Emily Osborne, executive producers; Nicole Quintero Ochoa, co-executive producer; Morgan Neville, Meghan Walsh and Charlise Holmes, producers	Apple TV+
2025 (77th)
2025 (77th)	Pee-wee as Himself	Emma Tillinger Koskoff, executive producer/producer; Matt Wolf, Ronald Bronstein, Benny Safdie, Josh Safdie, Paul Reubens and Candace Tomarken, executive producers	HBO
2025 (77th)	Deaf President Now!	Laurene Powell Jobs, executive producer; Amanda Rohlke, Davis Guggenheim, Jonathan King, Nyle DiMarco and Michael Harte, produced by; Wayne Betts Jr., producer	Apple TV+
2025 (77th)	Martha	Elise Pearlstein and Mark Blatty, executive producers; R. J. Cutler, Trevor Smith, Jane Cha Cutler, Alina Cho and Austin Wilkin, produced by	Netflix
2025 (77th)	Sly Lives! (aka The Burden of Black Genius)	Amit Dey, Ahmir "Questlove" Thompson, Zarah Zohlman and Shawn Gee, executive producers; Joseph Patel and Derik Murray, produced by	Hulu
2025 (77th)	Will & Harper	Rafael Marmor, Christopher Leggett, Will Ferrell, Jessica Elbaum and Josh Greenbaum, produced by	Netflix
2026 (78th)
2026 (78th)	My Mom Jayne: A Film by Mariska Hargitay	Nancy Abraham, Lisa Heller and Lauran Bromley, executive producers; Mariska Hargitay and Trish Adlesic, produced by; Anna Klein, senior producer; Steven Bennett, line producer	HBO
2026 (78th)	John Candy: I Like Me	Colin Hanks, Sean Stuart, Glen Zipper, Ryan Reynolds, George Dewey, Johnny Pariseau and Shane Reid, produced by	Prime Video
2026 (78th)	Marty, Life Is Short	Sara Bernstein, Meredith Kaulfers, Christopher St. John, Justin Wilkes, Lawrence Kasdan and Blair Foster, produced by; Ryan Carli, line producer	Netflix
2026 (78th)	Mel Brooks: The 99 Year Old Man!	Judd Apatow, Michael Bonfiglio and Kevin Salter, executive producers; Joe Beshenkovsky and Amanda Rohlke, co-executive producers; James A. Smith and Miranda Soto, supervising producers	HBO Max
2026 (78th)	Ocean with David Attenborough	Janet Han Vissering, Tom McDonald, Colin Butfield and Keith Scholey, executive producers; Toby Nowlan, producer	Nat Geo

== Total awards by network ==
- HBO – 13
- PBS – 5
- History – 3
- Netflix – 2
- Apple TV+ – 2
- CBS – 1
- Disney+ - 1
- Discovery – 1

== Producers with multiple awards ==
7 wins

- Sheila Nevins

5 wins

- Nancy Abraham

2 wins

- Judd Apatow
- Sara Bernstein
- Joe Beshenkovsky
- Michael Bonfiglio
- Liz Garbus
- Amanda Glaze
- Julie Goldman
- Davis Guggenheim
- Laurene Powell Jobs
- Mark Samels
- Nicole Stott

== Producers with multiple nominations ==
33 nominations

- Sheila Nevins

16 nominations

- Nancy Abraham

11 nominations

- Sara Bernstein

8 nominations

- Lisa Heller

7 nominations

- Justin Wilkes

6 nominations

- Jacqueline Glover

5 nomination

- John Hoffman

4 nominations

- Graydon Carter
- Liz Garbus
- Alex Gibney
- Rory Kennedy

3 nominations

- Judd Apatow
- Joe Beshenkovsky
- Michael Bonfiglio
- Tom Brown
- Dan Cogan
- Shari Cookson
- Erin Edeiken
- Jeanne Elfant Festa
- Blair Foster
- Bob Gazzale
- Davis Guggenheim
- Ron Howard
- Laurene Powell Jobs
- Meredith Kaulfers
- Peter Kunhardt
- Susan Lacy
- Frank Marshall
- Dyllan McGee
- Mark Monroe
- Dann Netter
- Frederick S. Pierce
- Melissa Roller
- Mark Samels
- Gary Smith
- Nicole Stott

2 nominations

- Karim Amer
- Ken Aymong
- Fenton Bailey
- Randy Barbato
- Christian Barcellos
- John Battsek
- Rudy Bednar
- Joe Berlinger
- Frances Berwick
- Margaret Bodde
- Kenneth Bowser
- Michael Cascio
- Ben Cotner
- Christopher G. Cowen
- Liz Day
- Ken Druckerman
- Nicholas Ferrall
- George Feltenstein
- David Fialkow
- Nelle Fortenberry
- Danny Gabai
- Dolores Gavin
- Amanda Glaze
- Gary Goetzman
- Julie Goldman
- Brian Grazer
- Sharon Grimberg
- Tom Hanks
- Spike Jonze
- Margaret Kim
- Mike Lerner
- Jessica Levin
- James Lipton
- Roger Mayer
- Amanda McBaine
- David McKillop
- Jesse Moss
- Julia Nottingham
- Stacey Offman
- Emma Pildes
- Jeff Pollack
- Samuel D. Pollard
- Anthony Stanislas Radziwill
- Nicole Rittenmeyer
- Mary Robertson
- Amanda Rohlke
- Maria Shriver
- Jonathan Silberberg
- Nigel Sinclair
- Chris Smith
- Shane Smith
- Steven Soderbergh
- Christopher St. John
- Samantha Stark
- Banks Tarver
- Susan Werbe
- Ryan White
- Jack Youngelson
