= Jon Drever =

British director, producer and screenwriter

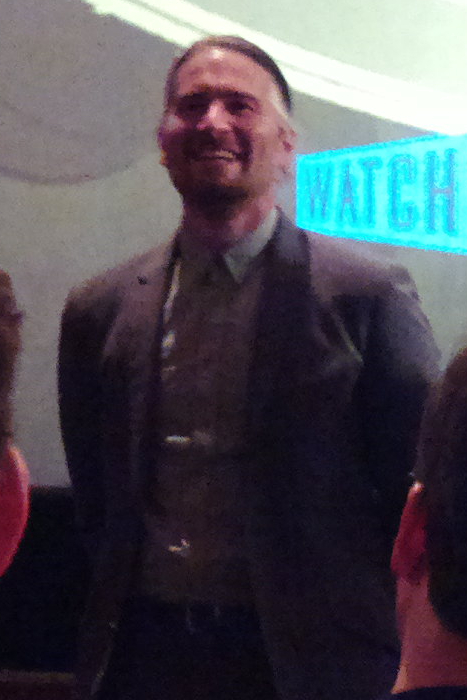
- Drever in June 2015
- Born: Jon Giuseppe Drever; 29 June 1979 (age 45)
- Occupations: Director; producer; screenwriter
- Years active: 2006–present

Jon Giuseppe Drever (born 29 June 1979) is a British director, producer and screenwriter, mostly working in comedy genre. He is best known for his collaborations with comedian Brett Goldstein, which include the low-budget feature film SuperBob (2015).

== Career ==
Together with his business partner, Orlando von Einsiedel, Drever co-founded the production company, Grain Media, which produced the Academy Award, Emmy and BAFTA-nominated feature-length documentary Virunga (2014), released on Netflix. He sold his half of the company in 2018 to concentrate on making comedy, working with comedy stars like Ross Noble, Aisling Bea, Diane Morgan, Joe Wilkinson, Javone Prince and more.

His directorial feature debut, SuperBob, was released in 2015 and starred Brett Goldstein (with whom he went to the same school in Sutton) as a Peckham postman-turned-superhero and Catherine Tate as his boss. It received four-star reviews from The Times, Evening Standard, Empire and Den of Geek. Drever described the film as "a gentle, upbeat, positive and funny romantic story about a man who learns to fight for what's important".

Drever and Goldstein continued working together after SuperBob, making short films Bullet to the Heart (2016), co-starring Aisling Bea, and Spectre of Shame (2018), with Goldstein as James Bond attending a sex addiction meeting.

== Filmography ==
Year	Title	Director	Producer	Writer	Editor	Notes
2009	SuperBob	Yes	Yes	Yes	Yes	Original three-minute short film
2014	Virunga	No	Yes	No	No	Executive producer
2015	SuperBob	Yes	Yes	Yes	No	Creator
2016	Bullet to the Heart	Yes	Yes	Yes	Yes	Short film starring and co-written with Brett Goldstein and Aisling Bea
2017	Ross Noble: Off Road	Yes	No	No	No	Three-part series
2018	Spectre of Shame	Yes	Yes	No	Yes	Short film starring and written by Goldstein
2018	Password	Yes	Yes	No	Yes	Short film starring and written by Joe Wilkinson
2019	The Tool	Yes	No	No	No	Web pilot episode starring Javone Prince
2020	Trevor	Yes	No	No	No	Short film

== Awards and nominations ==
Year	Award	Category	Work	Result	Ref.
2015	FilmQuest Awards	Best Screenplay (shared with Brett Goldstein and Will Bridges)	SuperBob	Won	
2015	FilmQuest Awards	Best of Fest	SuperBob	Nominated	
2015	FirstGlance Film Festival	Best Feature Length	SuperBob	Won	
2015	FirstGlance Film Festival	Best Science Fiction Film	SuperBob	Won	
2015	Crystal Palace International Film Festival	Best Comedy	SuperBob	Won	
2015	Crystal Palace International Film Festival	Best Feature Film	SuperBob	Nominated	
2015	Primetime Emmy Awards	Outstanding Documentary or Nonfiction Special (shared with Leonardo DiCaprio and other producers)	Virunga	Nominated	
