= We Ride: The Story of Snowboarding =

- Directed by: Orlando von Einsiedel; John Drever
- Produced by: Paz Parasmand
- Starring: Chuck Barefoot; Mike Basich; Tom Burt; Mike Chantry; Terje Håkonsen; Todd Richards; Ståle Sandbech; Gigi Rüf; Regis Roland; Jake Burton Carpenter; Tom Sims; Craig Kelly
- Narrated by: Jason Lee
- Edited by: Katie Bryer
- Music by: Patrick Jonsson
- Production company: Grain Media
- Release date: 31 January 2013 (Air & Style)
- Running time: 92 minutes
- Country: United Kingdom
- Language: English

We Ride: The Story of Snowboarding is a 2013 British documentary film about snowboarding. It was directed by Orlando von Einsiedel (himself a former professional snowboarder) and John Drever, and produced by Paz Parasmand for Grain Media.

The film traces snowboarding's routes back to the very beginning of the sport, starting in 1965 with Sherman Poppen's homemade invention for children, chronicling its boom in the 1990s up to its present mainstream status as a global cultural phenomenon. We Ride features interviews with some of the sport's most influential figures, including Todd Richards, Jake Burton Carpenter, Tom Sims, Craig Kelly, and burn-sponsored snowboarders Ståle Sandbech and Gigi Rüf. It was narrated by actor, comedian and pro-skater Jason Lee.

The film premiered at the opening of the annual snowboarding contest Air & Style in Innsbruck, Austria, on 31 January 2013, and made its online premiere on 24 February 2013.
