= The Cycle of Love =

2025 documentary film

- Theatrical release poster
- Directed by: Orlando von Einsiedel
- Produced by: Harri Grace; Chloe Leland; Karl Mahanandia Von Schedvin; Emelie Mahanandia Von Schedvin
- Starring: Mina Dale; Chirag Lobo; PK Mahanandia; Lotta von Schedvin
- Cinematography: Franklin Dow
- Edited by: Katie Bryer
- Music by: Patrick Jonsson
- Production companies: Grain Media; Kalabati Pictures; BD4; AMPL; Artemis Rising Foundation; Grace Labs; Wadlesfriede Films; Purple Pebble Pictures
- Distributed by: Variance Films; Dogwoof
- Release dates: August 29, 2025 (Telluride); August 28, 2026 (United States); September 18, 2026 (United Kingdom)
- Running time: 98 minutes
- Countries: United Kingdom; United States; Sweden; India
- Language: English
- Box office: $1 million

The Cycle of Love is a 2025 documentary film about the journey of P. K. Mahanandia, a Delhi street artist who in 1977 traveled 6,000 miles by bicycle to reunite with a woman he loved. The film premiered at the Telluride Film Festival on 29 August 2025. It was directed by Orlando von Einsiedel.

The film won the Artemis Rising Foundation Award at the Hamptons International Film Festival and the Audience Award for Best Documentary at the Middleburg Film Festival.

== Reception ==
On the review aggregator website Rotten Tomatoes, 100% of 16 critics' reviews are positive, with an average rating of 8.0/10.

Reviews so far have been positive. Christopher Campbell of Nonfics said "Everything about this film is beautiful" and "It’s one of the best movies I’ve seen this year, fiction or nonfiction". Daniel Howat of Next Best Picture said "The Cycle of Love employs gorgeously filmed recreations to immerse viewers in an epic love story that spans continents and decades.. It is a moving and deeply romantic film about destiny, connection, and the journey that binds them." Robert Daniels of Rogerebert.com said the film crafts "some of the most believable reenactments I’ve ever seen" and that the film was "Delicate and heartwarming, Orlando von Einsiedel’s stirring documentary The Cycle of Love is the kind of film whose sweet subject transcends time and borders."
