= Evelyn (2018 film) =

2018 documentary film

- Directed by: Orlando von Einsiedel
- Produced by: Joanna Natasegara
- Starring: Orlando von Einsiedel
- Cinematography: Franklin Dow
- Music by: Patrick Jonsson
- Production companies: Grain Media; Violet Films; BBC Films; British Film Institute; The Bertha Foundation
- Distributed by: Netflix
- Release dates: 11 October 2018 (London Film Festival); 10 September 2019
- Running time: 96 minutes
- Country: United Kingdom
- Language: English

Evelyn is a 2018 documentary film directed by and starring Orlando von Einsiedel.

== Premise ==
The premise revolves around Orlando's own family dealing with the effects of a suicide that took place 13 years earlier by Orlando's brother Evelyn, by taking a series of long walks visiting landscapes Evelyn liked to walk when he was alive.

== Cast ==
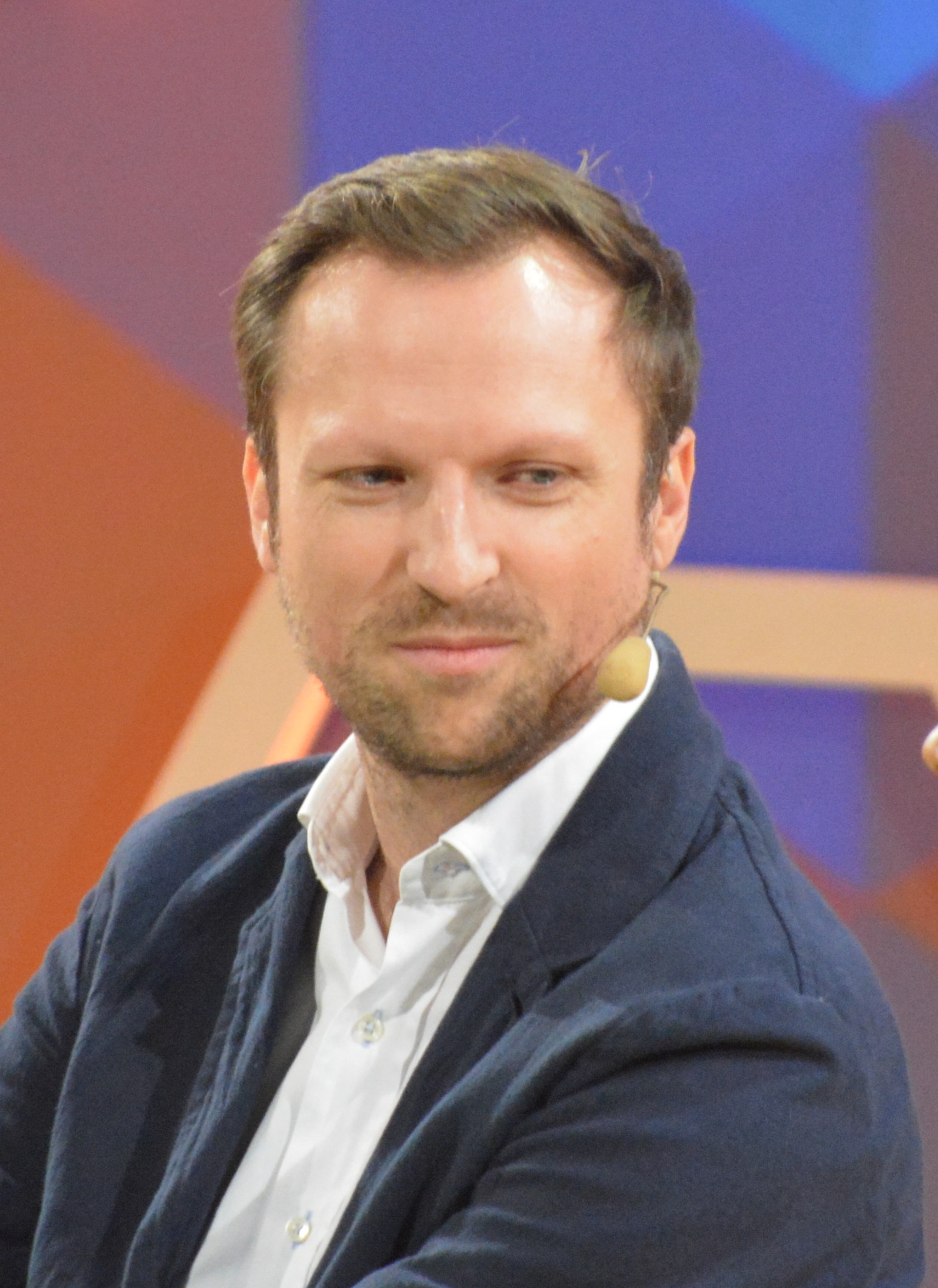
Evelyn director Orlando von Einsiedel in 2017

- Evelyn Einsiedel, posthumously
- Orlando von Einsiedel
- Gwendolyn (Gwennie) Einsiedel
- Robin (Robbie) Einsiedel
- Harriet Einsiedel (aka Beta)
- Andreas von Einsiedel
- Johanna Thornycroft
- Leon Oldstrong
- Jack Binney

== Camerawork and music ==
For large parts of the film, the camerawork appears to require an operator walking backwards. In fact the cameraman, Franklin Dow, had created a special camera rig that sat on his back with a stabilising mechanism. A screen in front allowed him to watch what was happening as the family/cast members walked behind chatting.

The musical score was mostly composed by Patrick Jonsson who had previously collaborated with von Einsiedel on Virunga and The White Helmets. One song was contributed by Evelyn's sister Gwendolyn Einsiedel, a musician in her own right who remembers singing almost every day during the making of the film, though very little made it into the final cut.

== Release ==
Evelyn premiered at the 2018 London Film Festival. It screened on BBC Two on 18 May 2019 and was released from 10 September 2019 on Netflix.

== Reception ==
Brenden Gallagher for the Daily Dot described the film as a "raw, powerful look at a family trying to make sense of suicide".

== Accolades ==
It was chosen as Best Documentary in the British Independent Film Awards of 2018.

== Outreach ==
GQ pointed out that suicide is now the single biggest killer of young British men and suggested that Evelyn might help break the code of silence that tends to surround the subject.

The film's website provides support links to help services including The Samaritans and Calm, and reproduces a poem from The Smoke Jumper by Nicholas Evans, best known as author of The Horse Whisperer.
