= We Ride (disambiguation) =

"We Ride" is a 2006 song by Rihanna.

We Ride may also refer to:

- "We Ride" (Brave Girls song), 2020
- "We Ride" (Bryan Martin song), 2022
- "We Ride (I See the Future)", a 2006 song by Mary J. Blige
- We Ride: The Story of Snowboarding, a 2013 documentary film
- "We Ride", a song by R. Kelly from the album R.
