= Mall'd to Death =

US musical group

Mall’d to Death
- Origin: Minneapolis, Minnesota, United States
- Genres: Punk rock
- Labels: It's Alive Records; Geykido Comet Records; Bitter Melody Records; Passion on Plastic
- Members: Tyler Barrett - Vocals/Bass; Dani Barstad - Drums; Dan Jensen - Guitar
- Website: Official Website

Mall’d to Death is a punk rock trio from Minneapolis, Minnesota. Their first release was on the 2009 benefit Protect 2 compilation on Scissor Press/Geykido Comet Records.

The band's debut full-length Can't Make a Living was released on June 15, 2010. It received positive reviews from critics and landed on several websites lists of the year's best music. The album's cover artwork was made by Corey Ayd of Banner Pilot. A video for “Skateboards for Afghanistan” was released as a promotion for Skateistan. Can't Make a Living was followed up by an appearance on the UnderStandablyBroken USB mixtape compilation

In December 2010, Bitter Melody Records announced they would be releasing Can't Make a Living on vinyl. In the same month, Mall’d to Death also appeared on the AMP Winter Compilation and 12 Years of GC Records compilation. In 2011, it was announced the band had signed with It's Alive Records for the release of the seven-inch EP The Process of Reaching Out which was followed up by their 2013 release More Than a Sinking Feeling on the same label.

In 2014, cassette label Passion on Plastic issued the band's entire studio discography on one release titled Mall'd to Death Collection Tape.

== Discography ==
=== Studio albums ===
- Can't Make a Living (2010)
- Can't Make a Living vinyl (2011)
- The Process of Reaching Out 7-inch (2011)
- More Than a Sinking Feeling 7-inch (2013)
- Collection Tape (2014)

=== Compilations ===
- Protect 2 (2009)
- UnderStandablyBroken (2010)
- AMP Winter Compilation (2010)
- 12 Years of GC Records (2010)
- It's Alive Records Show 'em the Hand Vol. II (2011)
- A Ray of Hope: Benefit Compilation for Japan (2011)
- 13 Years of GC Records (2013)
- It's Alive Records Show 'em the Hand Vol. III (2013)
- Razorcake Records Tear a Cognita #7 (2016)
- No Place For Hate: Musicians Against Fascism Vol. 1 (2018)
- Musicians Against Fascism Volume 2: Black Lives Matter (2020)
