= Roger Mayer =

Roger Mayer is the name of:

- Roger Mayer (engineer), British acoustic engineer
- Roger Mayer (executive) (1926–2015), American film industry executive
