= Gouby =

Gouby is a surname. Notable people with the surname include:

- Mélanie Gouby, French journalist
- Robert Gouby (1919–1944), French soldier
