= India's Forbidden Love =

2018 Tamil language documentary film

- Movie poster
- Directed by: Sadhana Subramanian
- Country of origin: India
- Original language: Tamil

Production
- Producer: Grain Media

Original release
- Release: March 2018

India's Forbidden Love is a 2018 Tamil language documentary film directed by Sadhana Subramanian and produced by Grain Media. The film rotates around the tale of a young lady named Kausalya, whose spouse was thrashed to death by a gang of goons on a highway.

In 2019, India’s Forbidden Love was nominated for the International Emmy Awards in the Best Documentary category.

== Synopsis ==
The documentary was filmed in Tamil Nadu’s Tiruppur district and revolves around the survivor of a brutal honour killing Kausalya who testifies against her parents in the murder trial of her lower-caste husband. The film also covers the pain, fear and challenges that Kausalya has gone through.

Sadhana Subramanian who is an investigative journalist has directed the film.

== People featured ==
- Kausalya
- Shankar
