= Protests during the State of the Nation Addresses of Rodrigo Duterte =

Political protests in the Philippines

- Part of the protests against Rodrigo Duterte
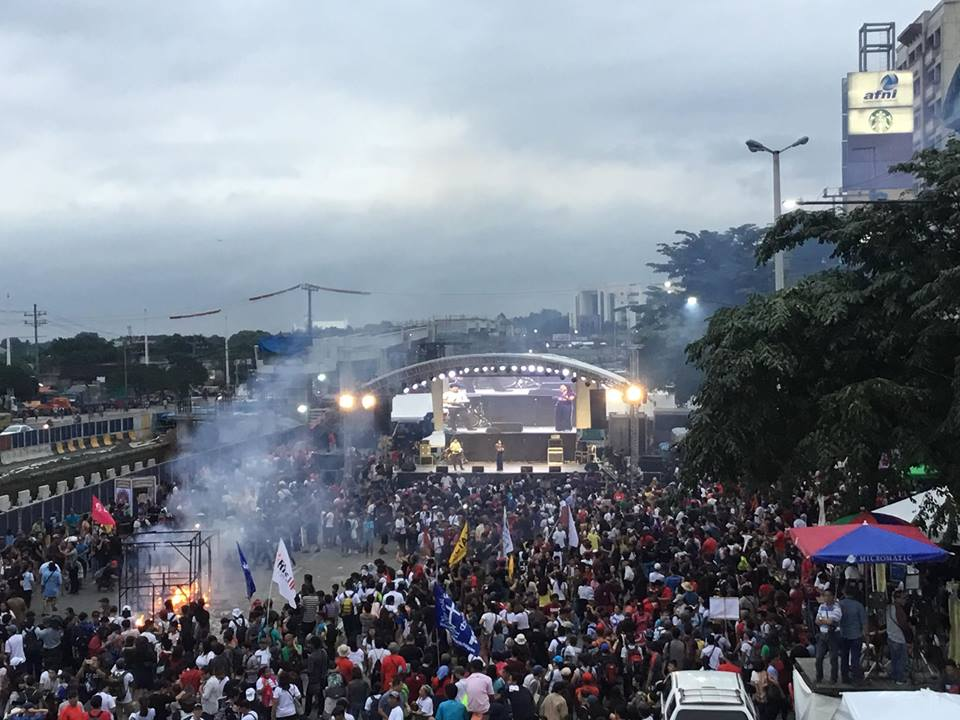
- Demonstrators during Duterte's SONA, 2018
- Date: every 4th Monday of July 2017–2021
- Location: Philippines

The State of the Nation Addresses of Rodrigo Duterte, the 16th president of the Philippines, were met with several protests.

== Events ==
=== 2017 ===
Several groups led the protest on the day of President Duterte's second State of the Nation Address (SONA). According to Renato Reyes, secretary general of Bayan, the president's promises of improvements during his first SONA still remained unfulfilled, including issues on contractualization, land reforms, and economic policy. Reyes also said that, "Under his administration, regularization has already happened: It is now regular to kill drug suspects, regular to sabotage peace talks, regular to militarize, and regular to spread fake news and disinformation." Also, labor unions Kilusang Mayo Uno and Alyansa ng mga Manggagawa Laban sa Kontraktwalisasyon led similar protests, calling "to resume peace talks and to end martial law in Mindanao." About 5,000 members of Bagong Alyansang Makabayan from Roxas City, 3,000 in Iloilo City, 2,500 in Kalibo, 500–800 in Cebu City, and 500 in Estancia, Iloilo, joined the protest, concerning an end to contractualization, land reform, free education and jeepney modernization. Also, about 300 Lumad people joined the protest, calling to stop the martial law.

At midnight, around 100 anti-Duterte protesters held a candle vigil, led by Senator Risa Hontiveros, condemning the extrajudicial killings and extension of martial law in Mindanao. Hontiveros called Duterte's second SONA a "fake." At night, Duterte confronted the protesters for the first time.

=== 2018 ===
Ahead of Duterte's third State of the Nation Address, opposition lawmakers announced that they will wear protest Barongs with artwork. Opposition figures—such as Senators Antonio Trillanes IV, Risa Hontiveros, and Bam Aquino—attend the mass at the University of the Philippines Diliman. There, Bishop Broderick Pabillo said on the sermon that the proposed federalism and the charter change are not the solution of wiping out the problem in the country.

Over 6,000 police officers will deploy in different areas in Metro Manila to secure the SONA. Dubbed the protest as "United People's SONA," different groups coalitions and organizations held a protests on the day of Duterte's third State of the Nation Address nationwide.

On July 23, 2018, the day of SONA, Bayan Muna Southern Tagalog featured Duterte's effigy and then burned it. Demonstrators gathered at University of the Philippines Diliman, slamming the series of killings in the country and the increase of basic goods due to Tax Reform for Acceleration and Inclusion Law (TRAIN law) while some considering to "Oust Duterte." Gabriela, in Commonwealth Avenue in front of Tandang Sora flyover, also slammed Duterte. In Bicol, militant groups also held a rally. Meanwhile, Pro-Duterte groups also gathered in Batasan Road. Bayan Muna Representative Renato Reyes claimed that about 40,000 have attended and he called it "the biggest SONA rally under the Duterte regime," but some sources claimed that number of people attended the rally is 24,000.

=== 2019 ===
A week before Duterte's fourth State of the Nation Address on July 22, 2019, it was announced that former Supreme Court Chief Justice Maria Lourdes Sereno will attend the rally against Duterte. Malacañang Palace said that Sereno and the militant are free to express their freedom by joining the rally. On July 22, 2019, in Commonwealth Avenue, Quezon City, militant groups burned the flags of United States and China and also calling for the impeachment of Rodrigo Duterte. A fishermen group, Fisherfolk, also joined the rally, expressing frustration "over what they said was Duterte's “treachery against the country and the people.”" The protesters continue the event despite heavy rain in the afternoon. They featured an effigy of Duterte depicting as siyokoy and then burned it. They also slammed Duterte for tying with the Chinese government amid the ongoing conflicts with the territorial disputes in the South China Sea. Families of alleged extrajudicial killing victims, Aeta people, and religious groups are seen also gathering at the event. According to the organizers, about 40,000 people attended the rally. The protesters also brought their children to the event.

To end the program, rapper Calix performed "Giyera Na Bulag" (lit. 'Blind War'), a song that is part of the rap protest album Kolateral. On other side, at least 760 Duterte supporters also gathered at IBP Road in Quezon City.

=== 2020 ===
For the upcoming Duterte's State of the Nation Address on July 27, 2020, Bagong Alyansang Makabayan (Bayan) Secretary-General Renato Reyes Jr. initially announced on July 21, 2020, that the group opposed the PNP calls to stay at home and protests online and will hold a protests physically on the streets for the SONA protests, but on the next day, Reyes said that they will use a virtual effigy for the SONA protests—the first time in the event citing the threat of the coronavirus disease. On July 26, 2020, a music video of Filipino adaptation of "Do You Hear the People Sing?" (Tagalog: "Di Niyo Ba Naririnig?") was launched, featuring several artists including Angel Locsin, Enchong Dee, Jodi Sta. Maria, Iza Calzado, Noel Cabangon and others.

On the day on SONA, over 6,000 police personnel were deployed along Batasan Pambansa and Commonwealth Avenue to secure the venue. At least 34 people have been arrested in Metro Manila including five members of transport group PISTON for violating the community quarantine protocols amid COVID-19 pandemic.

Dubbed the event as "#SONAgKAISA", activists held a rally at University of the Philippines and other streets in Metro Manila. Activist Mae Paner dressed up as Presidential Spokesperson Harry Roque, an ensemble took after Roque visited a marine adventure park in Subic, Zambales on July 2, 2020, which he previously defended as a "side trip", amid the strict enforcement quarantine protocols in Metro Manila. His visit was condemned by the netizens on social media. Following the denial of franchise for ABS-CBN by the Congress on July 10, employees of ABS-CBN Corporation participated the event. The rally concluded at 12 o'clock in the afternoon. The Quiapo Church held a mass where the attendees brought their placards bearing the message that opposes anti-terror law. The placards were later confiscated by the police in the middle of the mass. Outside Metro Manila, the event also held in several provinces.

=== 2021 ===
On the day of 5th and last SONA of Rodrigo Duterte, various groups gathered at the streets in Metro Manila. The police reminded them that they would held a rally until Tandang Sora Avenue, Quezon City. ABS-CBN employees also participated in the event. In Albay, two activists were shot dead by the police while they were painting text on the bridge that reads "DUTERTE IBAGS[AK]" ("Overthrow Duterte").

Filipinos abroad also held a rally in New York City, San Francisco, Southern California, Washington, D.C., and Toronto.
