= Rodrigue Mugaruka Katembo =

Congolese park ranger, activist (born 1976)

- Born: 1975 or 1976 (age 49–50); Katana
- Occupation: Park ranger
- Years active: 2003 to present
- Awards: Gold man environmental award

Rodrigue Mugaruka Katembo (born 1976 in Katana, South Kivu, DR Congo) is a park ranger from the Democratic Republic of the Congo. He was one of the winners of the 2017 Goldman Environmental Prize for his work protecting Virunga National Park. Katembo risked his life to uncover corruption in the attempts by SOCO International to drill for oil in the park. SOCO's presence threatened the survival of the critically endangered mountain gorillas of which an estimated 480 out the remaining 800 live within the park. The video footage he secretly recorded of SOCO contractors was included in the Netflix documentary Virunga. In 2020 it was announced that Leonardo DiCaprio was producing a feature film adaptation of the documentary; the film was being written and produced by Barry Jenkins. As warden, Katembo has also faced illegal charcoal harvesters, armed poachers and multiple militias.

Katembo's parents were Protestant farmers. At age 14 his hopes of becoming a pastor were thwarted when he was forced to join an armed militia. Katembo has stated that, although his time as a child soldier was traumatizing, he learned skills that later helped him protect against threats within the park.
