= Tê Giác Trắng oilfield =

Oil field in Cuu Long Basin, Vietnam

Te Giac Trang field
- Country: Vietnam
- Region: South China Sea
- Location: Cuu Long Basin
- Block: 16-1
- Offshore/onshore: Offshore
- Operator: Hoang Long JOC (partnership of PetroVietnam, SOCO International, PTTEP, OPECO)
- Partners: Hoang Long JOC; SOCO

Field history
- Discovery: 2005
- Start of development: 2009
- Start of production: 22 August 2011

Production
- Current production of oil: 55,000 barrels per day (~2.7×10^{6} t/a)
- Current production of gas: 30×10^{6} cu ft/d (850×10^{3} m^{3}/d)
- Estimated oil in place: 300 million barrels (~4.1×10^{7} t)
- Producing formations: Miocene sandstone

The Te Giac Trang field (White Rhinoceros field) is an offshore oil field in the Cuu Long Basin in the South China Sea, southeast of Vũng Tàu, Vietnam. The field is located in the block 16-1.

The field was discovered in 2003. The field lies at a water depth of 45 metres (148 ft). The reservoir of Miocene sandstone is estimated to have 300 million barrels (48×10^{6} m^{3}) of oil equivalent.

The development plan was approved in September 2009 and production started on 22 August 2011 by PetroVietnam jack-up platform PVD-II. The second platform, WHP-H4, started operations on 9 July 2012. Sixteen production wells are connected to two wellhead platforms. Oil is collected by a FPSO while gas will be exported to the Bạch Hổ platform. The FPSO Armada TGT 1 was converted from a Suezmax tanker by Keppel Offshore and Marine.

The field is operated by Hoang Long JOC, a partnership between PetroVietnam (41%), SOCO International (28.5%), PTT Exploration and Production (28.5%), and OPECO (2%). Hoang Long JOC holds 50% interest in the field while rest of 50% is held by SOCO.
