= Makers: Women Who Make America =

2013 American documentary film

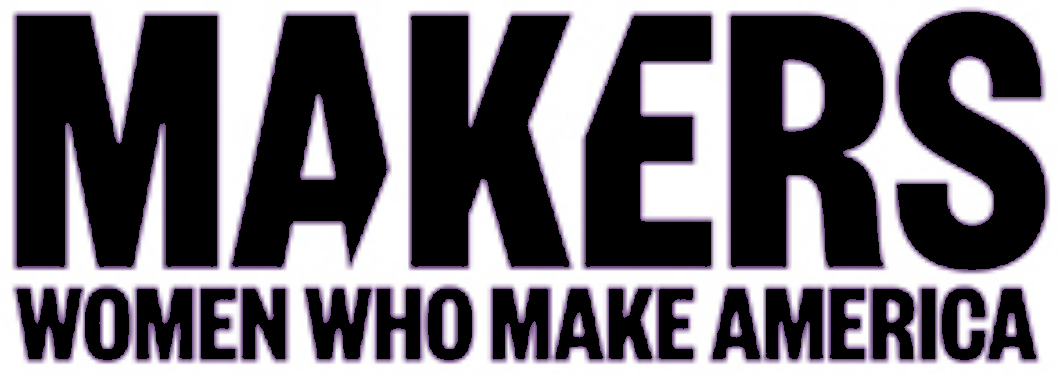
- Genre: Documentary
- Written by: Barak Goodman, Pamela Mason Wagner
- Directed by: Barak Goodman
- Narrated by: Meryl Streep
- Theme music composer: Joel Goodman
- Country of origin: United States
- Original language: English

Production
- Executive producer: Betsy West
- Producers: Dyllan McGee; Peter Kunhardt; Barak Goodman; Pamela Mason Wagner
- Running time: 3 hours
- Production companies: Kunhardt McGee Productions; Storyville Films; WETA; Ark Media

Original release
- Network: WETA-TV
- Release: February 26, 2013

Makers: Women Who Make America is a 2013 documentary film about the struggle for women's equality in the United States during the last five decades of the 20th century. The film was narrated by Meryl Streep and distributed by the Public Broadcasting Service as a three-part, three-hour television documentary in February 2013. Makers features interviews with women from all social strata, from politicians like Hillary Clinton and television stars like Ellen DeGeneres and Oprah Winfrey, to flight attendants, coal miners and phone company workers.

In 2014, PBS commissioned season 2 of Makers: Women Who Make America, a six-episode series that would expand on the themes of the 2013 documentary, as a continuation of PBS's broader Makers partnership with AOL. The series premiered on September 30, 2014.

== Background ==
Project founder and executive producer Dyllan McGee of McGee Media began what eventually became the Makers project in 2004. Originally, McGee set out to make a film about Gloria Steinem, but Steinem turned down the proposal. "She didn’t want it to be all about her – she wanted the bigger picture", McGee recalls. McGee named the documentary Makers to emphasize the sense of momentum in a continuing, ongoing women's movement.

== Synopsis ==
The first part of the film begins in the 1950s and 1960s ("Awakening"), and follows the impact of Betty Friedan's The Feminine Mystique (1963) on women in the United States. College student Kathrine Switzer runs the Boston Marathon as a registered competitor and challenges the ban on women. Judy Blume is featured, remarking that women "went to college; In case God forbid they had to go to work." During the 1950s and 1960s, it was looked down upon for any woman to have the job of a man. Gloria Steinem remembers, "You were supposed to be pretty and happy all the time." She didn't remember any serious or smart women during those years. During World War II, women worked in factories because so many of the men were gone. The second part takes place in the 1970s ("Changing the World"), and covers the sexual revolution and abortion debate. The third and last part of the film ("Charting a New Course") ends in the 1980s and 1990s, and discusses issues facing women in the workforce, violence against women, the Clarence Thomas Supreme Court nomination and sexual harassment.

== Production ==
Makers was produced by Storyville Films in partnership with Kunhardt McGee Productions and WETA-TV, and sponsored by AOL.

== Release ==
The documentary is linked to Makers.com, a collaborative project between PBS and AOL featuring videos of hundreds of women who contributed to the struggle for women's equality in the United States. Referring to the project, McGee said in 2014, "The goal of Makers is to be the largest collection of women's stories ever assembled." The video project went live in February 2012. The film premiered at Alice Tully Hall at the Lincoln Center for the Performing Arts in New York City on February 6, 2013. The documentary was first broadcast on PBS on February 26, 2013.

== Reception ==
David Wiegand of the San Francisco Chronicle called the documentary "one of the best and most far-reaching films about the modern women's movement".

== Featured women ==
The documentary features Secretary of State Hillary Clinton, comedian Ellen DeGeneres, Madeleine Albright, Christiane Amanpour, Geraldine Ferraro, Carol Burnett, Condoleezza Rice, Phyllis Schlafly, and women who appear on Forbes Most Powerful Women list. Lesser known women, such as Maria Pepe, who was instrumental in establishing the right of girls to play Little League Baseball, are also featured.

Name	Image	Notes
Betty Friedan		Friedan's 1963 book, The Feminine Mystique, helped influence the rise of second-wave feminism. She questioned the assumption that women should be satisfied with being only a wife and a mother. Author Kate Kelly notes that Friedan's book "gave voice to housewives who were beginning to realize that cleaning house and doing laundry wasn't exactly fulfilling." Inspired by Friedan's book, the National Organization for Women was formed in 1966 with Friedan as its first president.
Marlo Thomas		In 1966, Thomas began playing the character of Ann Marie in the ABC series That Girl, the first American sitcom to portray a single woman pursuing a career who didn't live with her parents or depend on her husband. Marlo Thomas explained she was sick of TV shows with the typical family set up; a working father, a mother as a housewife, and two children at home.
Katherine Switzer		In 1967, Switzer was a college student at Syracuse University. She wanted to run but her school did not have a track team where women could compete. The men's coach spoke glowingly about the Boston Marathon, inspiring Switzer to compete in the event. However, the marathon was an all-male competition. Women were discouraged from long-distance running with concerns that running might damage their reproductive organs. Switzer decided to register for the Boston Marathon as "K.V. Switzer", directly challenging the all-male entrant criteria in competitive sports. Jock Semple, the Boston Marathon race official, tried to pull her out of the race but Switzer's boyfriend blocked him and Switzer finished the marathon. Media coverage of the incident brought international attention to women's athletics.
Gloria Steinem		"Before this wave of feminism came along, the majority of people probably thought that male and female roles were due to biology or nature, or God or Freud, or something that you couldn't change. Now the majority of people in this country know that if there is inequality it's wrong, it's unjust, that we're all human beings, and the point is our individual talents. That's a huge change." Gloria Steinem made women realize that "you can be beautiful and have any man you want but still be critical of men, and be a little bit angry." Steinem looked for opportunities to write about feminism and liberation; in 1969 she had the chance to cover a public hearing about abortion. Steinem herself had an abortion straight out of college, and told no one. She realized that feminism and women's experiences would never be covered in magazines she wrote for, so she started ‘Ms.’. This was a magazine where women could tell the truth, and read the truth. Steinem was able to create the bridge across the racial and sexual orientation gaps that separated women in the feminist movement.

== Makers Season 2 ==
Makers
- Genre: documentary
- Created by: Dyllan McGee
- Country of origin: United States
- Original language: English
- No. of seasons: 2
- No. of episodes: 9 (Note: Although PBS continues to refer to the first production as a single documentary, the three parts into which it was divided for broadcast are counted here as separate episodes.)

Production
- Executive producer: Dyllan McGee (Season 2)
- Running time: approx. 1 hour
- Production companies: PBS; AOL

Original release
- Network: PBS
- Release: February 26, 2013 – present

On January 21, 2014, as part of its partnership with AOL in the Makers "initiative", PBS announced a six-episode series that would continue examining the themes of the original three-hour documentary. Each of the series's six episodes focuses on a different career field, and prominent women in that field. The series, referred to as "Makers Season 2" by PBS, premiered on September 30, 2014.

=== Episodes ===
No. in series	No. in season	Title	Featured women (Note: Partial lists.)	Producer(s)	Director(s)	Airdate	Narrator
4	1	Women in Comedy	Chelsea Handler, Mo'Nique, Sarah Silverman, Lily Tomlin, Carol Burnett, Ellen DeGeneres, Jane Lynch, Joan Rivers, Kathy Griffin	Heidi Ewing, Rachel Grady	Heidi Ewing, Rachel Grady	September 30, 2014	Leslie Mann
5	2	Women in Hollywood	Jane Fonda, Shonda Rhimes, Linda Woolverton, Lena Dunham, Glenn Close, Nancy Meyers, Zoe Saldaña	Rory Kennedy, Linda Goldstein Knowlton	Linda Goldstein Knowlton	October 7, 2014	Julia Roberts
6	3	Women in Space	Wally Funk, Jerrie Cobb, Eileen Collins, Shannon Lucid, Rhea Seddon, Kathryn Sullivan, Mae Jemison, Peggy Whitson, Marleen Sundgaard (née Martinez) (Sundgaard wrote test sequences for Lockheed Martin Space Systems that helped test the NASA Orion Spacecraft)	Michael Epstein	Michael Epstein	October 14, 2014	Jodie Foster
7	4	Women in War	Linda Bray, Valerie Plame Wilson, Molly Moore (as of 2014 a war correspondent), Clarissa Ward, Christiane Amanpour, Gen. Angela Salinas, V.Adm. Michelle Howard	Rachel Grady, Heidi Ewing	Rachel Grady, Heidi Ewing	October 21, 2014	Christiane Amanpour
8	5	Women in Business	Ursula Burns, Sallie Krawcheck, Cathy Hughes, Martha Stewart, Sheryl Sandberg	Leah Williams	Jamila Wignot	October 28, 2014	Julianna Margulies
9	6	Women in Politics	Hillary Clinton, Barbara Mikulski, Olympia Snowe, Shirley Chisholm, Rashida Tlaib, Raquel Castaneda-Lopez (the first Latina elected to the Detroit City Council; she was elected in November 2013), Elizabeth Warren, Susan Collins, Tulsi Gabbard	Rory Kennedy, Grace Lee	Grace Lee	November 4, 2014	Alfre Woodard
