= Skateistan =

International non-profit organization

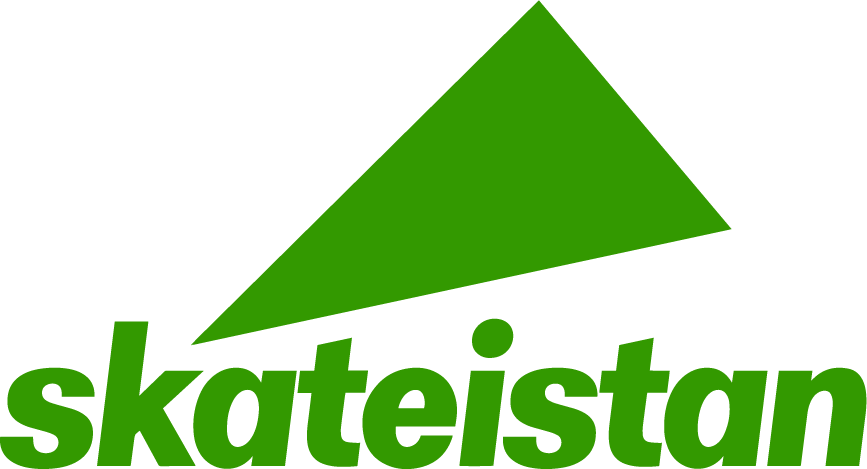
- Founded: 2007; Kabul, Afghanistan
- Type: Non-governmental organization
- Purpose: Youth empowerment, girls' education, trust-building
- Location: Berlin, Germany, European Union (International)
- Region served: Afghanistan, Cambodia, South Africa
- Method: Skateboarding, creative arts, sports, innovation, empowerment
- Key people: Oliver Percovich, founder and Co-Executive Director, Hala Khalaf, Co-Executive Director
- Website: http://www.skateistan.org

Skateistan is a non-profit organization that uses skateboarding and creative learning to support at-risk children and youth all over the world. Skateistan is a pioneering “social skateboarding” organization, and is one of the world’s most recognized Sports for Development NGOs. Today, Skateistan operates through partnerships in 50 locations across five continents, with an administrative office in Berlin, Germany.

Skateistan helps deliver programs across the world, mobilizing equipment, resources and knowledge exchange. Skateistan also operates the Goodpush Alliance, a knowledge-sharing network and incubator for over 1,000 social-skate projects.

Over 6,000 children and youth attend Skateistan programs every week, across Skate Schools in Afghanistan, Cambodia, South Africa, and partner projects globally. 54% of Skateistan participants are girls.

== History ==
Girls Skate Lessons at Mekroyan Fountain where Skateistan first began, Kabul, Afghanistan in 2008

Skateistan began in 2007 when Australian Oliver Percovich arrived in Kabul, Afghanistan, with three skateboards and began skateboarding in the streets with children. Percovich perceived the lack of opportunities for young Afghans, especially girls and working children, and realized that skateboarding was a way to engage them and build community. Skateistan took shape in the following years, with the help of international donors and skateboard industry partners. It was officially registered as an Afghan NGO in July 2009.

On October 29, 2009, in Kabul, Skateistan officially opened their first Skate School with classrooms and an indoor skatepark. A second Skate School was opened in northern Afghanistan in May 2013, in the city of Mazar-e-Sharif. A third Afghan Skate School was opened in Bamyan in 2021.

Skateistan has since grown to run their programs for children beyond Afghanistan. In 2011 Skateistan Cambodia was founded in Phnom Penh, and in 2014 Skateistan South Africa was founded in Johannesburg.

In 2018, Skateistan also established the first global knowledge-sharing network for the social skateboarding community – the Goodpush Alliance. The Goodpush Alliance serves as an incubator and connector, providing grants, resources and events for grassroots organizations and activists to grow within social skateboarding, as well as community-led spaces for thought, discussion and collaboration around key issues. The Goodpush network includes 1000+ initiatives in 115+ countries worldwide.

After the Afghan government fell to the Taliban in August 2021, the Skateistan schools in the country were shut down temporarily. By 2022, Skateistan was able to resume some of its programs in Afghanistan, and has a continued focus on education for girls in Afghanistan today.

In 2024, Skateistan became a women-led organization, welcoming Hala Khalaf as Co-Executive Director alongside Founder Oliver Percovich.

=== Overview ===
Skateistan's mission is to empower children through skateboarding and education.

The non-profit mainly targets at-risk children and youth with a big focus on inclusion for girls, children with disabilities, and children from low-income backgrounds. Through the partnerships model, children get access to resources and spaces to educate and empower themselves through skateboarding and creative learning. Currently, Skateistan collaborates with Program Partners in 50+ locations.

== International activities ==
=== Non-Profit Status ===
Skateistan has charitable / not-for-profit status in:

- Germany
- UK
- USA (501c3)
- Australia
- Canada

There are Skateistan NGOs registered in:

- Afghanistan (Afghanistan Skateboarding Training Organization - Skateistan)
- Cambodia (Skateistan Cambodia)
- South Africa (Skateistan South Africa)

=== Locations ===
- Skateistan Kabul (Afghanistan, 2007–2021)
- Skateistan Cambodia (Phnom Penh, 2011–present)
- Skateistan Mazar-e-Sharif (Afghanistan, 2013–present)
- Skateistan South Africa (Johannesburg, 2014–present)
- Skateistan Bamyan (Afghanistan, 2019–present)

== Recognition ==
=== Media coverage ===
Skateistan has been featured in thousands of media pieces around the world. It has appeared in most major media outlets including The New York Times, Foreign Policy, The Economist, Al Jazeera, The Telegraph and The Guardian. In 2020, a short documentary about Skateistan, 'Learning to Skateboard in a Warzone (if you're a girl)' won the BAFTA for British Short Film and the Academy Award for Best Documentary Short.

=== Documentaries ===
Several documentaries about Skateistan have been released:

- In 2010, a 9-minute short documentary entitled "Skateistan: To Live and Skate Kabul" was released by director Orlando von Einsiedel on the Internet.
- In 2011, a full-length documentary entitled "Skateistan: Four Wheels and a Board in Kabul" premiered at the Santa Barbara film festival in the United States. It was directed by Kai Sehr.
- In 2016, a short documentary, "The Skateboard and The City" was released covering their Skate School opening in Johannesburg, directed by Coral Brown.
- In 2017, Skateistan released "Land of Skate", shot by Ghost Digital Cinema.
- In 2020, "Learning to Skateboard in a Warzone (if You're a girl)", directed by Carol Dysinger and Elena Andreicheva won the Oscar for Documentary (Short Subject), and BAFTA for Short Film.

=== Publications ===
- 2012- The Tale of Skateboarding in Afghanistan, Published by Skateistan, ISBN 978-3-00-037631-3

=== Awards ===
Skateistan has been internationally recognized with a number of awards for its use of skateboarding and sport as a tool for education, youth development and peace:

2023:

- Founder & Co-Executive Director Oliver Percovich receives the TAFISA Jürgen Palm Award for his significant contribution to the Global Sport for All and Physical Activity Movement

2022:

- Founder & Co-Executive Director Oliver Percovich receives the EINE WELT-Medaille (One World Medal) from BMZ, Germany’s Ministry for Economic Cooperation and Development

2021:

- .Org Impact Awards - Education Impact Award
- Sporsora Award for Global Impact

2020:

- IOC Women and Sport Award

2019:

- Inspiration Award at Esquire Middle East Awards.
- .ORG Impact Award in the ‘Best Integrated Marketing Campaign’ category

2018:

- HundrED Top 100 Innovators in Education

2017:

- We Work Creator Award, Berlin

2016:

- NGO Advisor - Top 500 NGO's Worldside - #67

2015:

- "Eric Stricker Memorial" Award from Transworld Skateboarding Magazine

2014:

- "Champion of Learning through Play" Award from ASHOKA and LEGO Foundation
- "Frankin Paine's Skatepark Fund" Award for social justice through skateboarding

2013:

- #85 in The Global Journal's "Top 100 NGOs" for 2013
- Winner of the "UNICEF Sport for Education" Award at Beyond Sport Forum

2012:

- Winner of Beyond Sport "Innovation through Sport" Award
- Shortlisted for the Beyond Sport "Social Inclusion" Award
- Winner of ISPO Marketing and Social Awareness Award

2011:

- Winner of Peace and Sport "Image of the Year" Award
- Shortlisted for the Beyond Sport "Conflict Resolution" and "Sport for Education" Awards
- Sundance Film Festival screens "Skateistan: To Live and Skate Kabul"
- "Most Valuable Documentary" at Cinema for Peace Festival in Berlin for feature-length Skateistan documentary "Four Wheels and a Board in Kabul
- Winner of ISPO Brandnew Social Awareness Award

2010:

- "Best Documentary" at L.A. Skate Film Festival for Skateistan short film
- Sappi Design Award "Ideas that Matter"

2009:

- Winner of Peace and Sport Award "NGO of the Year"
- Recipient of Gamechangers/Architecture for Humanity "Architecture for Sport with a Social Outcome" Award
- Golden "Dove of Peace" (UN initiative)
