= SuperBob =

2015 British superhero mockumentary comedy film

- Theatrical release poster
- Directed by: Jon Drever
- Screenplay by: William Bridges; Brett Goldstein
- Story by: William Bridges; Jon Drever; Brett Goldstein
- Based on: SuperBob (short film) by Jon Drever
- Produced by: Wayne Marc Godfrey; Robert Jones; Jon Drever
- Starring: Brett Goldstein; Natalia Tena; Laura Haddock; Ruth Sheen; David Harewood; Catherine Tate
- Cinematography: Mattias Nyberg
- Edited by: Katie Bryer
- Music by: Rupert Christie
- Production companies: Grain Media; Jones Company Productions; The Fyzz Facility
- Distributed by: Signature Entertainment
- Release date: 16 October 2015 (United Kingdom)
- Running time: 85 minutes
- Country: United Kingdom
- Language: English

SuperBob is a 2015 British superhero mockumentary comedy film directed by Jon Drever and written by William Bridges and Brett Goldstein, from a story by Bridges, Drever and Goldstein. Based on Drever's 2010 short film of the same name, it stars Goldstein as Bob Kenner, a Peckham postman who becomes the world's first superhero after being struck by a meteorite fragment. The cast also includes Natalia Tena, Laura Haddock, Ruth Sheen, David Harewood and Catherine Tate.

Presented in a mock-documentary format, the film follows Bob as he tries to balance his duties as a government-employed superhero with his personal life on his weekly day off.

The project grew out of Drever's short film and was developed into a feature with Goldstein and Bridges. Filming took place largely in Peckham and other London locations in 2013. SuperBob was first screened at the London Comedy Film Festival in January 2015, where it won the festival's Discovery Award, and was released theatrically in the United Kingdom on 16 October 2015. The film received generally positive reviews, with critics praising its humour, low-budget charm and Goldstein's performance.

== Plot ==
In 2008, a fragment of meteorite lands in Peckham, London, striking mild-mannered postman Robert "Bob" Kenner and giving him extraordinary powers. Unable to control them, he eventually surrenders to the authorities after crashing into The Shard. Bob is then trained by the Ministry of Defence and becomes "SuperBob", the world's first superhero, working for the British government as a civil servant.

Six years later, Bob is still socially awkward and lonely despite his fame. His superior, Theresa Ford, authorises a documentary intended to present him as an ordinary man rather than a state-controlled weapon. Bob explains to the film crew that he gets every Tuesday off and is preparing for his first date in years, with a librarian named June. He lives in Peckham with his security guard Barry, while his cleaner, Dorris, also cares for his mother at her residential home and hopes to raise enough money to open a nursery in Colombia.

While shopping for clothes for the date, Bob is summoned by Theresa, who is preparing him for a meeting with American senator Bill Jackson at a Ministry of Defence weapons summit. Jackson regards SuperBob as a dangerous asset the British government cannot fully control, and Theresa wants Bob to follow a carefully managed public line. Encouraged by Dorris and by his own growing frustration, Bob defies Theresa and resumes his day off. He is then called to his mother's care home after she has an accident. Because his mother suffers from short-term memory loss, she mistakenly assumes Bob and Dorris are a couple. To avoid upsetting her, they play along, and their closeness makes Bob realise he has feelings for Dorris.

On the way home, Bob responds to a fatal motorway pile-up despite being under orders not to work. He comforts a dying woman at the scene, then returns home shaken. June arrives for their date, but Bob decides not to continue with it after admitting that he wants to be with Dorris instead.

Bob and June are abruptly taken to the summit, where June reveals that Theresa arranged their date because an American girlfriend would make Bob more politically useful. Bob then learns that the United States has funded Dorris's nursery project so that she will leave Britain. Furious at the manipulation, he escapes through the roof and disappears, prompting an international search.

Bob eventually finds Dorris back at the care home, where local residents block police from reaching him. The two confess their feelings, and Bob announces that he is resigning from government service and will operate independently rather than as British state property. After saying goodbye to Theresa and his mother, Bob and Dorris leave for Colombia. A closing montage shows them together there while Bob continues working as a superhero, and Theresa is reassigned to Afghanistan.

== Cast ==
- Brett Goldstein as Bob
- Natalia Tena as Dorris
- Laura Haddock as June
- Ruth Sheen as Pat
- David Harewood as Simon
- Catherine Tate as Theresa

== Production ==
SuperBob grew out of a 2010 short film of the same name directed by Jon Drever, on which the later feature was based. Drever said he made the short for a brief about a local hero and conceived Bob Kenner as a superhero from Peckham with ordinary, lonely problems rather than the glamorous life associated with American comic-book heroes. He cast his school friend Brett Goldstein in the title role, and the pair developed the short through improvised sessions before shooting it over two afternoons on a minimal budget. The short was later shortlisted for the Virgin Media Shorts awards.

According to Drever, the short attracted the attention of Film4 executive Katherine Butler, after which Drever, Goldstein and writer William Bridges received a development deal to expand the premise into a feature film. Goldstein estimated that the project took almost five years to reach release, with the screenplay being developed over roughly two years and passing through numerous versions before the team found the right balance between superhero comedy and romance. Drever said that Goldstein eventually took the lead on the screenplay, while story ideas were tested in workshops with actors during development.

The project gained further momentum when producer Robert Jones brought it to The Fyzz Facility, which backed the film alongside Drever's company Grain Media and Jones Co. In Goldstein's account, Jones's support made the production appear more viable and helped move it out of its long development period. He also recalled that the script was sent to Catherine Tate, who agreed to join the cast as Bob's government handler Theresa, while David Harewood was later cast as a television news anchor.

Research for the film included meetings with the Ministry of Defence about how the British state might respond if a real superhero existed, an idea that informed the film's satirical portrayal of Bob as an overworked government employee. Principal photography began in July 2013 and took place over roughly three weeks, largely in Peckham and other London locations. Drever, who lived in Peckham, described the film as "a love letter to Peckham", and Goldstein recalled that some street scenes were shot in a guerrilla style. He also noted that filming was temporarily halted on the first day when police responded to a man with a knife nearby.

The film then spent about a year in editing as the team worked to balance its improvised comic material with the story's more emotional beats.

== Release ==
SuperBob was first screened at the London Comedy Film Festival at BFI Southbank on 24 January 2015, where it won the festival's Discovery Award. It later screened in the Narrative Spotlight section of the San Diego Film Festival as a US premiere during the festival, which ran from 30 September to 4 October 2015. Signature Entertainment released the film theatrically in the United Kingdom on 16 October 2015, followed by a home-entertainment release on 19 October.

== Reception ==
On the review aggregator website Rotten Tomatoes, 86% of 7 critics' reviews are positive, with an average rating of 6.9/10.

Critics frequently highlighted the film's low-budget charm, its distinctly British twist on the superhero film, and Brett Goldstein's performance in the title role. Chris Hewitt of Empire praised the film's warmth and heart, while Mark Kermode of The Observer described it as an amiable expansion of Jon Drever's short. Victoria Luxford of Radio Times similarly wrote that the film succeeded through its script rather than spectacle, praising Goldstein's likeable lead turn and the satire built around bureaucracy and international politics.

Several reviewers also commended the humour. Ben Williams of Time Out wrote that the film delivered "plenty of laughs" through its sharp dialogue, visual gags and Goldstein's understated performance, although he found the romantic plot predictable. Mark Harrison of Den of Geek called the film "an absolute treat", and Steve Bennett of Chortle described it as a sweet and witty comedy that deserved to become a modest cult hit. In a more critical review for The Guardian, Wendy Ide argued that the film's sentimental, unfocused approach blunted the sharper edge suggested by its premise.
