= Mélanie Gouby =

Mélanie Gouby is an investigative journalist, writer and documentary filmmaker based in London. Her work focuses on the systemic root causes underpinning violence and conflict, and their impact on human rights, development and the environment.

== Education ==
Gouby studied Politics and International Relations at University College London.

== Career ==
From 2009 to 2011, she covered the trials of Congolese rebel leaders at the International Criminal Court in The Hague. From 2011 to 2014, she lived in Goma, in the east of the Democratic Republic of Congo, where she covered the rise of the M23 rebellion through to its defeat at the hands of the Congolese army, as well as mining, business and development for the Associated Press. She earned international recognition for her investigation into the British oil company Soco International’s activities in the Virunga National Park, featured in the Oscar-nominated documentary Virunga, as well as a One World Media award for Corruption Reporting.

She was the East Africa correspondent for the French newspaper Le Figaro from 2014 to 2016, and has contributed to Newsweek, France 24, Vice, Foreign Policy, and the Washington Post among others.

== Awards and honours ==
In 2019, she was a nominee for the inaugural Mary Chirwa Award for Courageous Leadership.
