= Kolateral =

Studio album by various artists
- Released: June 29, 2019
- Genres: OPM; Pinoy hip hop; political hip hop
- Label: NOFACE

Kolateral (lit. 'Collateral') is a studio rap album by Sandata, a group headed by Filipino rap artists and activists BLKD and Calix. It has twelve tracks that offer narratives and socio-political commentary on the Philippine drug war under Philippine President Rodrigo Duterte. The album uses themes of art, activism, and protest and is a product of two-years worth of research from the stories of the victims, data gathered, and other information. It was released June 29, 2019.

== Background ==
The Philippine drug war, which is the ongoing drug policy of the Philippine government under President Duterte, has been pointed out by critics on its effects on the human rights situation of the Philippines. The number of those who have been killed range from the official government figures of 5,104 to as many about 29,000 classified as "deaths under inquiry." After three years since the start of Duterte's term in 2016, research and activism has led to various artists to collaborate to make the Kolateral album. The album was made to recognize the abuses of the drug war, as well as to call for action.

== Songs ==
The album features twelve tracks regarding the adverse effects of the ongoing drug war.

The opening track is entitled "Makinarya" (lit. 'Machinery'), which offers a glimpse on the workings of the drug war under the command of President Duterte.

The next three tracks and the sixth track offer narratives regarding the effects of the drug war on the lives of affected sectors. "Boy" (a common street nickname in the Philippines for boys) is about young street folk. "Distansya" (lit. 'Distance') retells the experiences of an overseas Filipino worker (OFW) working in Kuwait named Luzviminda Siapo who had a child back in the Philippines. Her nineteen-year-old son, named Raymart, was abducted and killed on March 29, 2017, because their neighbor accused him of peddling marijuana. The song laments on how the government praises OFWs while disregarding the domestic human rights situation. In the song, she questions how someone with a disability can be a drug pusher. This refers to how Raymart suffered from club feet. "Papag" (lit. 'Sleeping Mat') is about an urban poor family. "Hawak" (lit. 'Hold') is based on the story of couple Jerico and Angel who were killed because of the drug war.

"Giyera Na Bulag" (lit. 'Blind War') talks about how the drug war anonymously targets the poor for the said government policy, as well as the anonymity of the perpetrators. It aims to expose how policemen killed many people to meet certain quotas. "Pagsusuma" (lit. 'Summary') sums up and raises questions on the drug war's contradictions. The eight and ninth songs identify and point out to the executioners of the human rights violations. "Neo-Manila" claims and narrates how the police and local government officials are involved in the drug war on the street-level, while "Parasitikong Abusado" (lit. 'Abusive Parasites') points out that the drug war is big business for the alleged main perpetrators of government fascism, including Duterte himself.

The last three songs call for action. "Walang Maiiwan" (lit. 'No One Left Behind') calls the urban poor towards inclusion and resistance. "Stand By" explores the economic roots of why there are tambay (derogatory term for idle or jobless people) and rallies them against these causes. The song is in reference to the a related government campaign policy, Oplan Tambay, in which officials managed to arrest about 8,000 bystanders who were said to have violated local city ordinances. The song opposes how the government uses the poor again and again as scapegoat. The last song, "Sandata" (lit. 'Weapon'), features nine rappers with their own verses, which makes it the longest song in the album. The song is noted to feature uncensored Tagalog and English profanity, explicitly directed against Duterte himself. It starts and ends with lines that advocate for its listeners to tear down the "fascist government" and the "rotten system." "Sandata" ends with door knock sound effects, which are the exact sound effects that kicks off "Makinarya," the opening track. The door knock sound effects are in reference to Oplan Tokhang, a component policy of the drug war, in which the term tokhang is from the merger of two Cebuano words toktok, which means knock, and hangyo, which means plead.

== Release ==
Social media platforms, such as Facebook, were used as primary avenues of publicity for the album. "Makinarya" was first posted as a lyric video on the album's Facebook page on April 12, 2019. A promotional video was posted on June 26, 2019, announcing the release of the album on June 29. Under the internet label NOFACE Records, the entirety of the album was released digitally and can be streamed on Spotify, Apple Music, and YouTube. It was made available for free and can be downloaded through file-sharing sites Google Drive, MediaFire, and Dropbox. There has been no plans to release the album in its physical form.

The album cover was a photograph by Kimberly dela Cruz of a mural of Archie Oclos in Sitio San Roque, an urban poor community in Quezon City that is said to have also experienced cases of killings relating to the drug war. BLKD encouraged his followers on twitter to integrate with the community as it also faces threats of demolitions to give way to a mixed-use central business district by Ayala Land, called Vertis North.

On July 23, 2019, Calix performed "Giyera Na Bulag" to serve as the ending performance of the protest against the 2019 State of the Nation Address (SONA) of President Duterte.

Sandata has been going around schools, music bars, and other venues to spread the message of the album and to obtain assistance for the victims of the drug war.

== Personnel ==
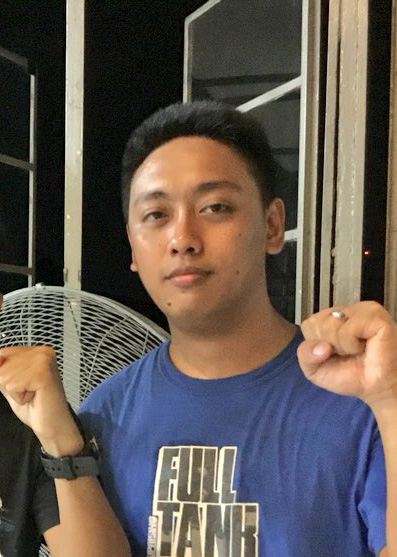
Rap artist BLKD

=== Musicians ===
- 1KIAO – writer (track: 9), vocals (track 9)
- Bang Boss – vocals (track 12)
- Because – vocals (track 12)
- BLKD – writer (tracks 1, 2, 7, 8, 11) vocals (tracks 1, 2, 7, 8, 11)
- Calix – writer (tracks 1, 3, 4, 5, 6, 9, 10, 11, 12), vocals (tracks 1, 4, 5, 10, 11, 12), arrangement (tracks 1–12), production (tracks 1, 2, 3, 4)
- Gerone – additional intro (track 2)
- Kartell'em – writer (track 2), vocals (track 2)
- Kiyo – vocals (track 12)
- Lanzeta – vocals (track 12)
- maaliw (fka James Ussher) – additional strings (track 6), intro (track 7)
- Mixkaela Villalon – writer (tracks 6, 10), arrangement (tracks 1, 3, 4, 5, 7, 8, 9), additional vocals (track 11)
- Moki Magpantay – voice over (track 7)
- Muro Ami – writer (track 3), vocals (track 12)
- Neil – additional vocals (track 4)
- Promote Violence – vocals (track 12)
- Pure Mind Quiet Heart – vocals (track 12)
- Serena DC – production (tracks 1–12)
- Tao – vocals (track 6), additional vocals (track 11)
- Tatz Maven – writer (track 5), vocals (track 5)
- WYP – vocals (tracks 9, 11)
- 霏 – vocals (track 3)
- twitter users – additional vocals (track 5)

== Track listing ==
No.	Title	Artist(s)	Length
1.	"Makinarya"	Calix, BKLD	4:36
2.	"Boy"	Kartell'em, BLKD	5:52
3.	"Distansya"	Muro Ami, 霏	3:55
4.	"Papag"	Calix	3:51
5.	"Giyera Na Bulag"	Calix, Tatz Maven	3:42
6.	"Hawak"	Tao	5:39
7.	"Pagsusuma"	BLKD	3:13
8.	"Neo-Manila"	BLKD	2:24
9.	"Parasitikong Abusado"	1Kiao, WYP	5:37
10.	"Walang Maiiwan"	Calix	3:58
11.	"Stand By"	BLKD, Calix, WYP	4:13
12.	"Sandata"	Calix, BLKD, Lanzeta, Because, Pure Mind Quiet Heart, Muro Ami, Kiyo, BAND BOSS, Promote Violence	5:23
