= Serena DC =

Australian documentary filmmaker

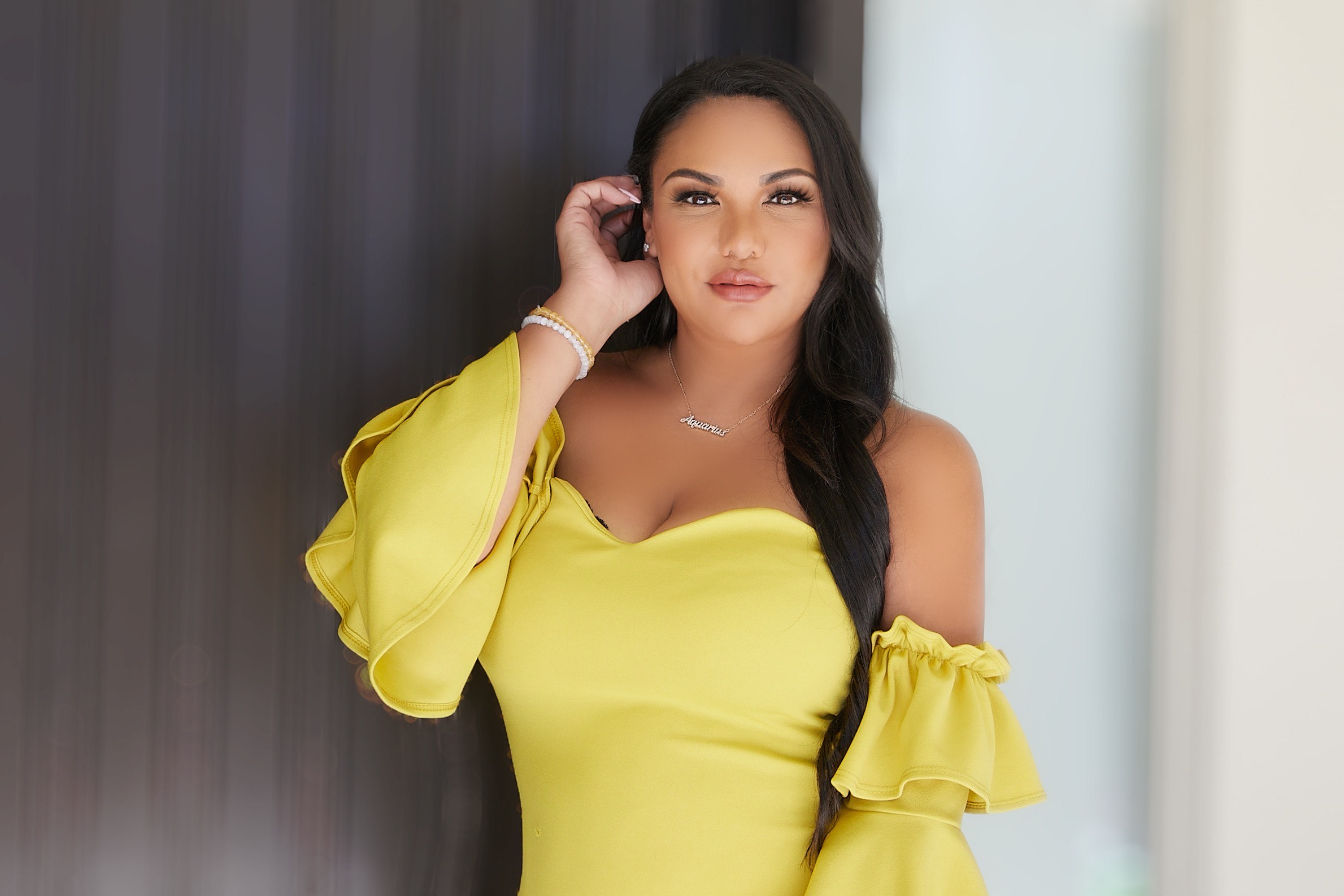
- Born: Australia
- Occupation(s): Filmmaker, TV personality
- Years active: 2017–present

Serena De Comarmond, known by her stage name Serena DC, is an Australian documentary filmmaker. She is currently based in Beverly Hills, California.

== Career ==
Serena initially appeared as a competitor on the Netflix reality TV series Instant Hotel. Later, she started hosting her own shows, including Dream Life and Hollywood Disclosure with Serena DC. She is the founder of Elysium Media, a film and TV production company, as well as Ad Astra, a distribution company.

In 2022, Serena co-directed her first documentary feature, My Transparent Life, along with Miko Allyn, and received a Primetime Emmy Awards nomination for Outstanding Documentary or Nonfiction Special. In 2023, she directed two documentaries Contact: The CE-5 Experience and Beyond the Grave.

== Selected filmography ==
Year	Title	Contribution	Note
2024	Catastrophic Disclosure	Director, writer and executive producer	Documentary
2024	Interview with the Extraterrestrial	Director, writer and executive producer	Documentary
2023	Beyond the Grave	Director, writer and executive producer	Documentary
2023	Contact: The CE-5 Experience	Director, writer and executive producer	Documentary
2022	We Are Not Alone	Writer and executive producer	Documentary
2022	My Transparent Life	Director, writer and executive producer	Documentary
2020–2021	Hollywood Disclosure with Serena DC	Writer and executive producer	5 episodes
2020–2021	Dream Life	Director, writer and producer	20 episodes

== Awards and nominations ==
Year	Result	Award	Category	Work	Ref.
2024	Nominated	Beverly Hills Film Festival	Best Documentary	Beyond the Grave	
2023	Nominated	Primetime Emmy Awards	Outstanding Documentary or Nonfiction Special	My Transparent Life	
