= Dyllan McGee =

American television producer

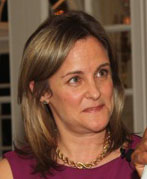
- McGee in 2013
- Occupation: Filmmaker
- Years active: 1993- present
- Spouse: Married
- Children: 2

Dyllan McGee is a documentary filmmaker and founder of McGee Media. In partnership with Peter Kunhardt, McGee produced "Gloria: In Her Own Words” (HBO), “Finding Your Roots with Henry Louis Gates Jr.” (PBS), "MAKERS: Women Who Make America” and many more. McGee is the Founder and Executive Producer of AOL's MAKERS.

Her films include the documentary, Gloria: In Her Own Words (HBO), The African Americans: Many Rivers to Cross (PBS); Teddy: In His Own Words (HBO); Faces of America with Henry Louis Gates Jr. (PBS); This Emotional Life (PBS); African American Lives (PBS); Oprah’s Roots (PBS); and In Memoriam; 9/11/01 (HBO). McGee was the Founding Executive Director of the Meserve Kunhardt Foundation and the Gordon Parks Foundation. From 2003 to 2005 Dyllan served as the Director of Content and Operations for the International Freedom Center on Ground Zero in New York, a cultural institution that was proposed as part of the Lower Manhattan Development Corporation's redevelopment of the World Trade Center site. [1] [2]

McGee is the recipient of many awards including two Emmy awards, a DuPont Journalism award, a Peabody award, the New York Women in Communications Matrix Award, and Planned Parenthood’s Women of Valor award. She also served on the Board of Directors for The Taft School from 1997 to 2007. She lives in Katonah, NY with her husband and two boys.

== Filmography ==
| Year | Title | Type |
|---|---|---|
| 2013 | Makers: Women Who Make America | Mini-series |
| 2012 | Finding Your Roots with Henry Louis Gates, Jr. | Series documentary |
| 2011 | Gloria: In Her Own Words | Documentary short |
| 2010 | Faces of America with Henry Louis Gates Jr. | Series documentary |
| 2010 | This Emotional Life | Series documentary |
| 2009 | Teddy: In His Own Words | Movie documentary |
| 2009 | Benjamin Latrobe: America's First Architect | Movie documentary |
| 2009 | Looking for Lincoln | Movie documentary |
| 2008 | African American Lives 2 | Mini-series |
| 2007 | Til the River Runs Clear | Movie documentary |
| 2005 | The Search for Eternal Egypt | Movie documentary |
| 2003 | Freedom: A History of Us | Series documentary |
| 2002 | In Memoriam: New York City | Movie documentary |
| 2005 | Echoes from the White House | Movie documentary |
| 1999 | Radio City Music Hall: The Story Behind the Showplace | Movie documentary |

== See also ==
- Makers: Women Who Make America
