= Skateistan: To Live and Skate Kabul =

Afghani film

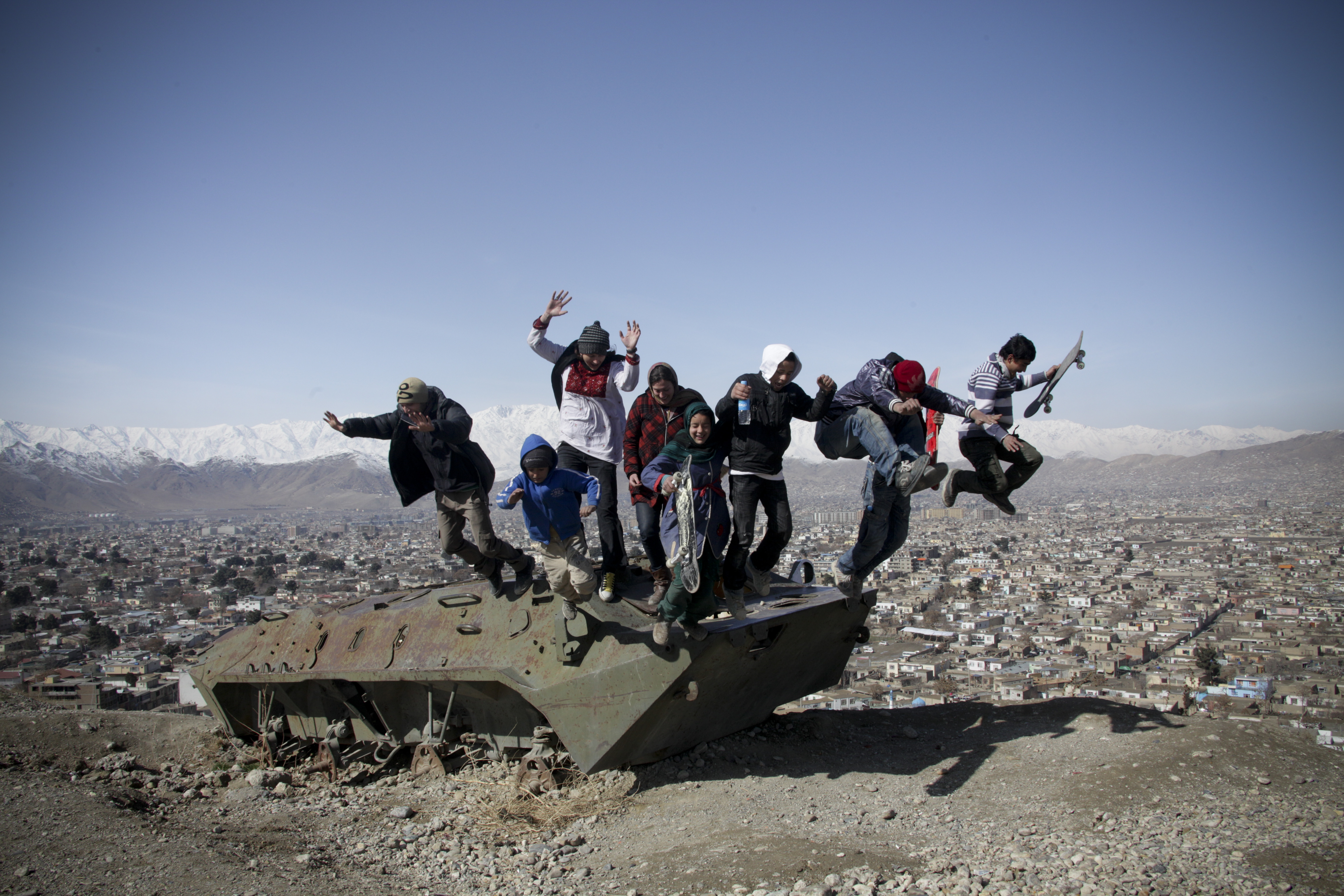
Skateistan pupils and staff jump from a discarded tank on Wazir Akbar Khan hill overlooking Kabul

Skateistan: To Live and Skate Kabul is a short film that follows the lives of a group of young skateboarders in Afghanistan. Operating against the backdrop of war and bleak prospects, the Skateistan charity project is the world's first co-educational skateboarding school, where a team of international volunteers work with girls and boys between the ages of 5 and 17. The short documentary film follows the lives of young skateboarders in Afghanistan, directed by UK filmmaker Orlando von Einsiedel. The film team includes cinematographer Franklin Dow and editor Peta Ridley .

The multi-awardwinning documentary film has received over a million hits online and has been the official selection at a number of top film festivals across the world including Sundance 2011, SXSW 2011, Sheffield Doc/Fest 2010, One World 2011, Santa Cruz 2011 and The London Short Film Festival 2011. Awards to date include: Best Documentary LA Skate Film Festival, Best Documentary Portable Film Festival, Best Editing Underwire Film Festival, Best Cultural Film Sheffield Adventure Film Festival, Finalist Fuji Film Shorts 2011.
