= Bob Gazzale =

American television producer

- Born: United States
- Occupations: President, CEO

Bob Gazzale became the American Film Institute's third president and CEO in November 2007.

Gazzale is from California. He graduated from the University of Virginia, where he helped to launch the Virginia Festival of American Film in 1988. Gazzale was director of the festival until 1992, producing over 200 events. It featured film industry individuals such as James Stewart, Gregory Peck, and Charlton Heston.

Gazzale joined the American Film Institute in 1992 and has held various positions including Director, AFI National Programs in New York and Director, AFI Productions in Los Angeles. He has been writer and producer of the AFI Life Achievement Award telecasts for twelve years and worked on the AFI's 100 Years...100 Movies series. He also created the format for the AFI Awards, as well as the "AFI Night at the Movies". He won an Emmy in 2014.
