= Hal Gessner =

American television producer (born 1948)

Hal Gessner (born May 22, 1948 in New York City, New York) is an American television producer. He was the senior producer and director for Lifestyles of the Rich and Famous. He was a producer on Face To Face with Connie Chung (CBS News), Street Stories with Ed Bradley (CBS News) and Day One (ABC News) before becoming the executive producer of the Saturday edition of The Early Show on CBS from 1997 to 2002. Gessner is the creator of the Chef on a Shoestring segment which was turned into a best-selling cookbook.

He is the creator and producer of Stunt Junkies and "FutureCar" on The Discovery Channel and other network shows developed by CBS Eye Too Productions.

== 9/11 Films ==
Gessner has collaborated on two documentary films covering the September 11 Attacks. He was the executive editor of 9/11, shot by the Naudet brothers and narrated by Robert De Niro. The film won the primetime Emmy Award for Outstanding Non-Fiction Special in 2002. Gessner also received a Christopher Award and a Peabody Award, and an Edward R. Murrow Award for his work on the film.

In 2006, Gessner executive produced Dust to Dust: The Health Effects of 9/11, which documented the respiratory problems of 9/11 rescue workers. The film aired on the Sundance Channel and was narrated by actor Steve Buscemi, a former New York City firefighter.
