= Gigi Rüf =

Austrian snowboarder

Christian 'Gigi' Rüf (9 October 1981 in Au, Austria) is an Austrian professional snowboarder known for his unique style and creativity. He is most famous for his film segments, having filmed extensively with Absinthe films, Kingpin productions and The Pirates. He was part of the old Burton UNINC crew, but left Burton after the rest of the team was disbanded, and his outerwear sponsors Volcom offered to provide him with pro model board sponsorship as well. After a long stint with Volcom as his main sponsor, in 2012 he set up his own snowboard brand called Slash and announced that Nike would be expanding his boot sponsorship to include outerwear as well.

As of the 2025/2026 season Gigi still rides snowboards from his Slash brand along with Union Ultra bindings and Union Reset Pro boots. His outerwear sponsor is 686.
