= Virunga (film) =

- Promotional poster
- Directed by: Orlando von Einsiedel
- Written by: Orlando von Einsiedel
- Produced by: Orlando von Einsiedel; Joanna Natasegara
- Cinematography: Franklin Dow
- Edited by: Katie Bryer; Masahiro Hirakubo; Miikka Leskinen; Peta Ridley
- Music by: Patrick Jonsson
- Production companies: The Bertha Foundation; Britdoc Foundation; Grain Media; Violet Films; Appian Way Productions
- Distributed by: Netflix
- Release date: 17 April 2014 (Tribeca)
- Running time: 100 minutes
- Countries: United Kingdom; Congo
- Languages: English; French

Virunga is a 2014 British documentary film directed by Orlando von Einsiedel. It focuses on the conservation work of park rangers within the Congo's Virunga National Park during the rise of the violent M23 Rebellion in 2012 and investigates the activity of the British oil company SOCO International within the UNESCO World Heritage Site. Soco International ended up officially exploring oil opportunities in Virunga in April 2014. The film premiered at the Tribeca Film Festival on 17 April 2014. After airing on Netflix, it was nominated for an Academy Award for Best Documentary Feature.

== Synopsis ==
The documentary tells the story of four characters fighting to protect Virunga National Park in the Democratic Republic of Congo, home to the world's last mountain gorillas, from war, poaching, and the threat of oil exploration. Following gorilla caregiver André Bauma, central sector warden Rodrigue Mugaruka Katembo, chief warden Emmanuel de Merode, and the French investigative journalist Mélanie Gouby, the film focuses on the natural beauty and biodiversity of Virunga, as well as the complex political and economic issues surrounding oil exploration and armed conflict in the region.

== Production ==
Production began in 2012, when von Einsiedel traveled to Virunga National Park in the Democratic Republic of Congo with the intention of documenting the positive progress which had been made by the park authorities in encouraging tourism and development in the region. However, within three weeks of arriving in Virunga, conflict began with the M23 rebellion in April 2012, shifting the focus of the film to cover the emerging conflict.

Von Einsiedel collaborated with park officials and French journalist Mélanie Gouby to investigate the role of the British oil company Soco International, which had been undertaking activities in the area. Undercover filming showed Soco representatives offering bribes to park rangers.

Soco International has strongly denied the allegations made in the documentary.

== Release ==
Virunga had its world premiere at the Tribeca Film Festival in New York City on 17 April 2014. The premiere of the film came just two days after Virunga National Park's chief warden, Emmanuel de Merode, was shot by unidentified gunmen on the road from the city of Goma to the park's headquarters in Rumangabo. De Merode survived the attack and the premiere of Virunga went ahead afterwards.

The film has been screened at multiple film festivals around the world, including Canadian festivals Hot Docs and DOXA; Docville in Leuven, Belgium; in the U.S. at Little Rock Film Festival in Arkansas, Mountainfilm in Colorado, AFI Docs in Washington DC, Traverse City Film Festival in Michigan. The UK premiere of the film was at the Edinburgh International Film Festival on 24 June 2014.

On 28 July 2014, it was announced that Netflix had picked up exclusive rights to the film. The documentary was released onto the service on 7 November the same year. On 23 June 2020 it was announced that Barry Jenkins would write the feature film adaptation of Virunga, and that Leonardo DiCaprio would produce it.

== Reception ==
=== Critical reception ===
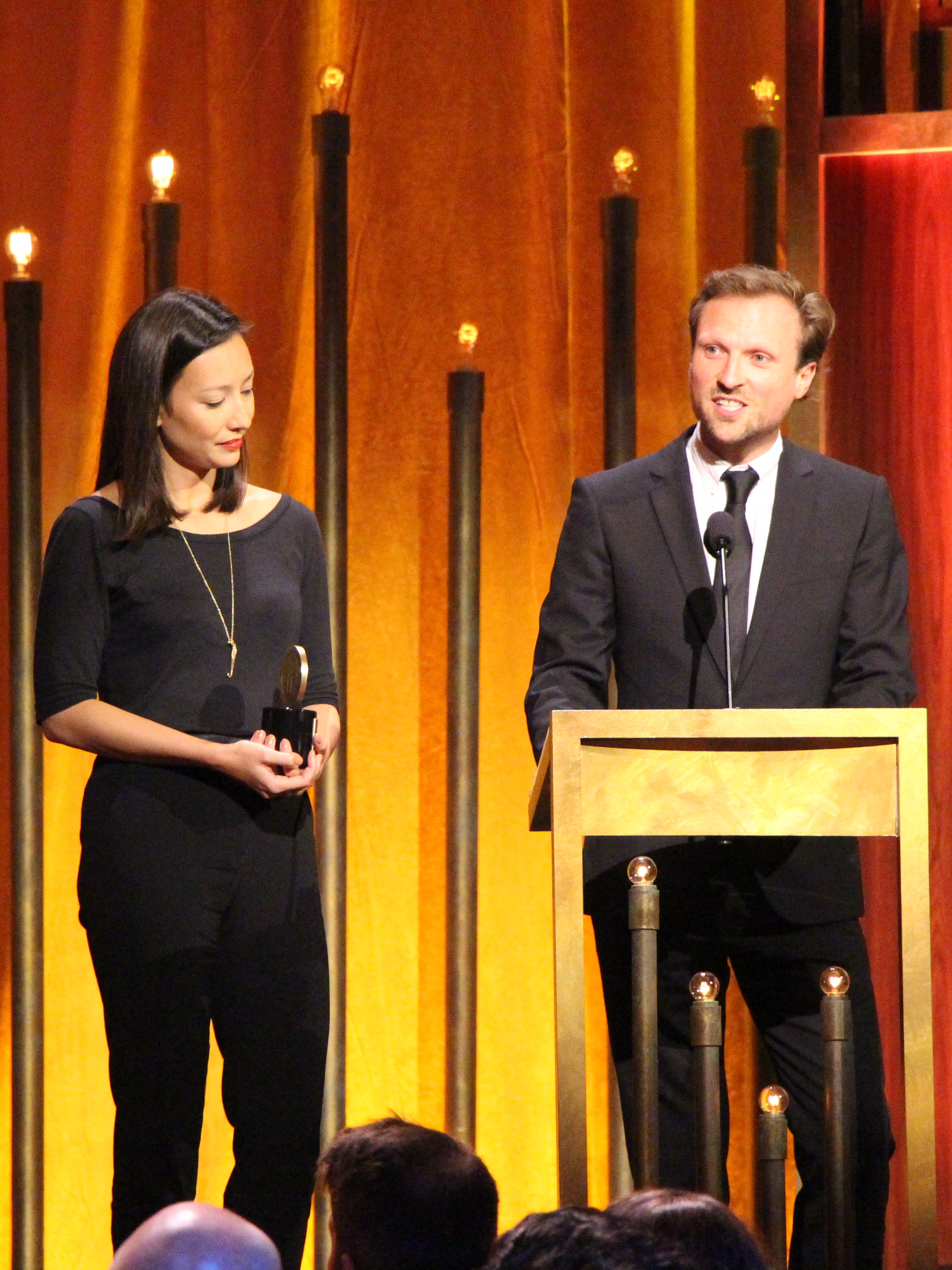
Joanna Natasegara and Orlando von Einsiedel at the 74th Annual Peabody Awards

Virunga has received universal acclaim by critics. On Rotten Tomatoes, the film has a 100% rating based on 21 reviews with an average rating of 9.09/10. The site's critical consensus reads "Virunga offers a heart-rending glimpse of natural wonders vulnerable to the atrocities of greed -- and the people devoting their lives to defending them". Metacritic, another review aggregator, assigned the film a weighted average score of 95 out of 100 based on 5 reviews from mainstream critics, indicating "universal acclaim". It is currently one of the site's highest-rated films.

Jeannette Catsoulis, writing for The New York Times, called the film "extraordinary", whilst Los Angeles Times film critic Sheri Linden described Virunga as an "urgent investigative report and unforgettable drama... a work of heart-wrenching tenderness and heart-stopping suspense". Ronnie Scheib wrote for Variety that Virunga was an "extraordinary documentary" with "enough action, pathos, suspense, venal villains, stalwart heroes and endangered gorillas for a dozen fiction films". Tom Roston wrote for PBS's POV blog that "Virunga is the best documentary I've seen this year."

=== Awards ===
Virunga has won several awards including the Peabody Award; the Feature Documentary Award at DOXA Documentary Festival in Vancouver, Canada; the Award of International Emerging Filmmaker at Hot Docs in Toronto; the Golden Rock Documentary Award at Little Rock Film Festival; and the Action and Change Together (ACT Now) Award at the Crested Butte Film Festival. It won two gongs at the One World Media Awards at BAFTA - Best Documentary, and the Corruption Reporting award. The film was also nominated for Best Documentary Feature at Tribeca Film Festival. The film was nominated for the Academy Award for Best Documentary Feature for the 87th Academy Awards.

== Impact ==
The allegations brought against Soco International by the documentary, and supported by local NGOs and civil society organizations working in and around Virunga National park, put increased pressure on the company to put an end to its exploration for oil within the protected World Heritage Site.

On 11 June 2014, Soco International and the WWF announced a joint statement in which the oil company committed "not to undertake or commission any exploratory or other drilling within Virunga National Park unless UNESCO and the DRC government agree that such activities are not incompatible with its World Heritage status". This was widely cited as a victory for WWF, which had long been campaigning for Soco to leave the region, and credit was also given to the filmmakers. However, strong concerns about the credibility of this agreement were raised by the filmmakers, alongside other NGOs such as Global Witness, Human Rights Watch, and local civil society organizations.

World Wildlife Fund executives now acknowledge that the battle over Virunga is hardly over. Soco has yet to relinquish its operating permits or commit to an unconditional withdrawal. "They're leaving the door open," said Zach Abraham, director of the World Wildlife Fund's global campaigns.

On 13 March 2015, BBC reported that the Democratic Republic of Congo says it could potentially redraw the boundaries of Virunga National Park, to allow for oil exploration.

On 4 November 2015, Soco said it no longer held a stake in the exploration license for the DRC national park.

== External link ==
- Virunga on Netflix
- Virunga at IMDb
- Virunga at Rotten Tomatoes
- Virunga at Metacritic
