= Patrick Jonsson =

Swedish film composer and music producer

- Born: Sweden
- Genre: Soundtrack
- Occupations: Composer, music producer
- Instruments: Piano, guitar, bass, keyboard, synthesizer, trumpet, percussion
- Website: www.patrickjonsson.com

Patrick Jonsson is a Swedish film composer and music producer based in London.

== Career ==
Jonsson's credits include the documentaries Virunga (2014) and The White Helmets (2016), and the feature Bends (2013), for which he was nominated for Best Original Score at the Golden Horse Awards.

Jonsson is a multi-instrumentalist living and working in the United Kingdom, but regularly works on U.S. projects. His score to Virunga was picked out as one of the by Hitfix and his score for Frame by Frame was nominated for Best Documentary Score at the Hollywood Music in Media Awards in 2015. He has also assisted composers on a number of studio level feature films such as Thor, Rise of the Planet of the Apes, and Brave.
