= Orlando von Einsiedel =

British film producer (born 1980)

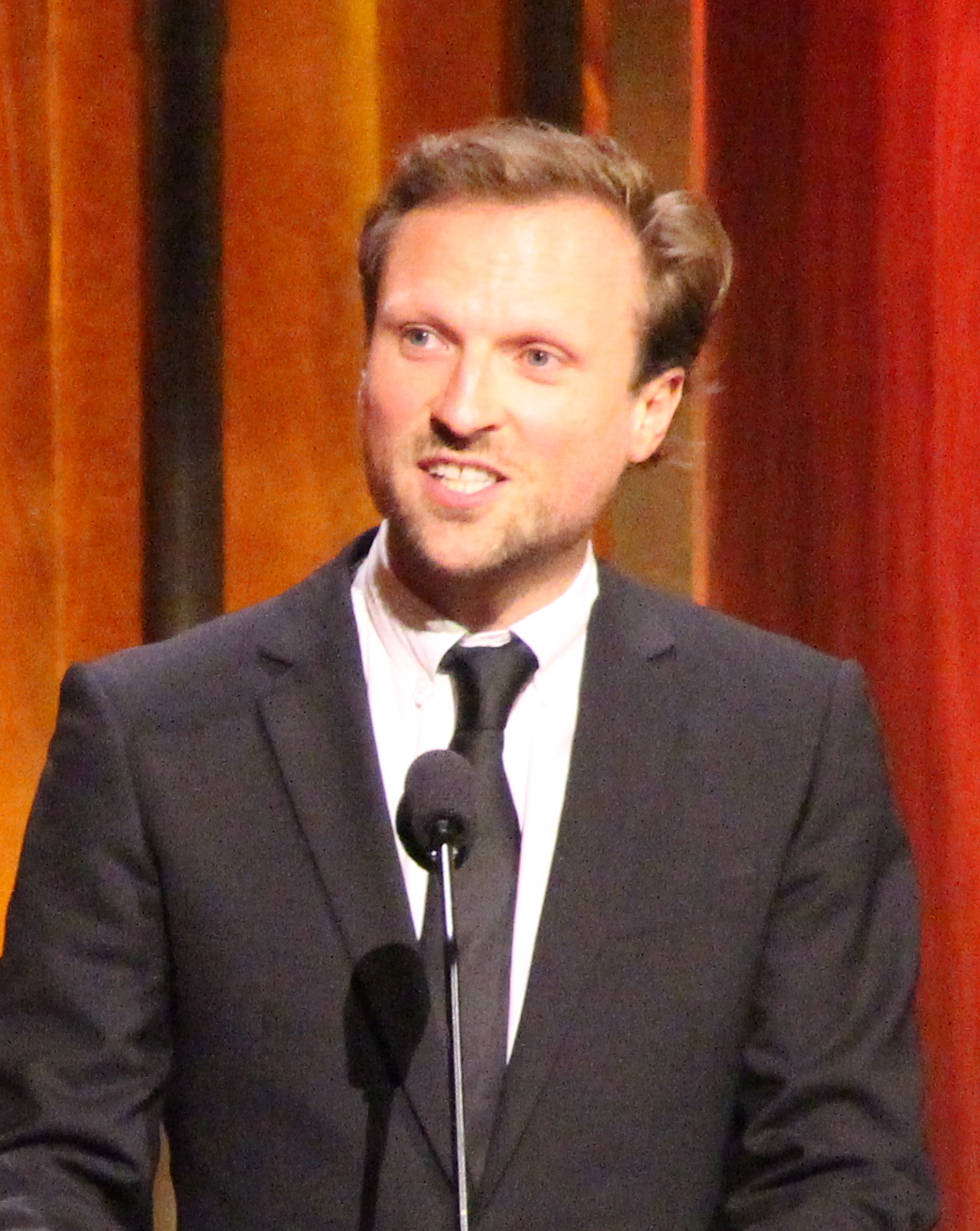
- Born: August 1980 (age 46); London, England
- Education: University of Manchester; London School of Economics
- Occupations: Film director, producer
- Years active: 2010–present
- Notable work: Virunga, The White Helmets, Evelyn, Learning To Skateboard In A Warzone (if you're a girl), The Lost Children
- Website: Grain Media

Orlando von Einsiedel (born in August 1980) is a British film director and producer. He directs mostly documentary films that investigate global social issues, and has filmed in various places around the world, including Africa, Asia, America and the Arctic. Von Einsiedel became known for his award winning film Virunga, produced with the cooperation of Virunga National Park director Prince de Merode.

== Early life ==
Von Einsiedel is the grandson of Wittgo von Einsiedel, a second cousin of Heinrich Graf von Einsiedel, and of Walburga von Oberndorff; both were members of the former German nobility. His father, Andreas Jean-Paul von Einsiedel, was a photographer specialising in architecture and interiors. Von Einsiedel grew up in Forest Gate, London, with his mother Harriet, a British music therapist. He attended Alleyn's, an independent school in East Dulwich, London.

== University ==
Von Einsiedel studied social anthropology at the University of Manchester and got an MSc in anthropology and development at the London School of Economics.

== Film career ==
Von Einsiedel began his filmmaking career making snowboard films before moving into documentaries. Many of von Einsiedel's documentaries have been screened at film festivals including the Sundance Film Festival, the Telluride Film Festival and the Toronto International Film Festival.

Von Einsiedel directed Virunga (2014), which received an Academy Award nomination for Best Documentary Feature, and The White Helmets (2016), which won for Best Documentary (Short Subject). Both nominations were shared with producer Joanna Natasegara. His 2018 film, Evelyn, about his late brother, launched at the London Film Festival and won the BIFA for Best Documentary. In 2020, Learning to Skateboard in a Warzone (if you're a girl), a film he was an executive producer on and which grew out of his earlier film Skateistan: To Live and Skate Kabul, won the Academy Award for Best Documentary (Short Subject). In 2024 he released Los Niños Perdidos / The Lost Children. The film was nominated for a Platino Award and reached the number 2 spot on the Netflix global top ten most watched films list. In 2025 von Einsiedel released The Cycle Of Love which launched at the Telluride Film Festival.

In 2006, he co-founded Grain Media.

== Snowboard career ==
Von Einsiedel spent several years as a professional snowboarder.

== Filmography ==
Year	Title	Director	Producer	Notes
2010	Skateistan: To Live and Skate Kabul	Yes	Yes	Documentary Short
2012	Aisha's Song	Yes	Yes	Documentary Short
2012	Radio Amina	Yes	Yes	Documentary Short
2012	Pirate Fishing	Yes	No	TV Series
2013	We Ride: The Story of Snowboarding	Yes	No	
2013	The Cure: Doctors on Everest - Investigating Intensive Care	Yes	No	TV Series
2013	Earthrise	Yes	Yes	TV Series
2014	Virunga	Yes	Yes	
2014	We Are Fire	Yes	No	Documentary Short
2015	King of the Mountain	Yes	No	Documentary Short
2015	SuperBob	No	Yes	Executive Producer
2016	The White Helmets	Yes	No	Documentary Short
2018	Evelyn	Yes	No	
2018	Bruce Lee And The Outlaw	No	Yes	Executive Producer
2019	Learning to Skateboard in a Warzone (If You're a Girl)	No	Yes	Executive Producer
2019	Lost and Found	Yes	No	Documentary Short
2019	Into The Fire	Yes	No	Documentary Short
2019	The Seahorse	No	Yes	Executive Producer
2020	Still Human	Yes	No	Documentary Short
2020	The Lost Forest	Yes	No	Documentary Short
2021	Convergence: Courage in a Crisis	Yes	Yes	
2021	Death in Bollywood	No	Yes	Executive Producer
2021	The Phantom	No	Yes	Executive Producer
2021	Into Dust	Yes	No	Short Film
2022	From Devil's Breath	Yes	No	Documentary Short
2022	Bastille: Hope For The Future	Yes	No	Music Video
2023	The Walk	No	Yes	
2023	Heart of Invictus	Yes	No	Documentary Series
2024	The Lost Children	Yes	No	
2024	Buy Now! The Shopping Conspiracy	No	Yes	Executive Producer
2025	The Cycle of Love	Yes	No	
2026	Allies in Exile	No	Yes	
