= Roger Mayer (executive) =

American film industry executive (1926–2015)

Roger Mayer

Roger Laurance Mayer (April 21, 1926 – March 24, 2015) was an American film industry executive. He was best known for his efforts on behalf of film preservation and for his support of the film industry's humanitarian charity, the Motion Picture & Television Fund. In 2004, he was awarded the Jean Hersholt Humanitarian Award.

== Biography ==
Mayer was born in Manhattan. He attended the Horace Mann School. He served in the United States Army Air Forces during World War II era. After the war, he received his bachelor's degree from Yale University in 1948, and a law degree from Yale Law School in 1951. He moved to Los Angeles and sought a position at one of the city's major downtown law firms, but was rejected, being told that those firms didn't hire Jews. He was eventually hired as a lawyer at Columbia Pictures, where he worked for nine years. He then moved to Metro-Goldwyn-Mayer (he was not related to MGM co-founder Louis B. Mayer), where he established an early film preservation program at the studio, at a time when such efforts were not seen as financially rewarding, and eventually rose to become President of MGM Laboratories.

In 1986, Mayer became president and chief executive of Turner Entertainment Co. In that position, he was responsible for managing the large library of motion pictures that Ted Turner had purchased from MGM, including high-profile restorations and re-releases of landmark MGM films like Gone with the Wind and The Wizard of Oz, as well as being a focus of controversy when he supported Ted Turner's decision to colorize some old black-and-white films in the library.

Mayer became a founder and chair of the National Film Preservation Foundation in 1996. In that capacity, he was credited with enabling the preservation of more than 2,000 orphan films, films whose original copyright had expired or otherwise lacked commercial potential sufficient to pay for their preservation. He also sat on the National Film Preservation Board of the Library of Congress. In addition, Mayer also served as chairman of the Motion Picture & Television Fund, an industry charity that provides healthcare and social services.

== Awards ==
Mayer, Rick Schmidlin, and Turner Classic Movies shared a 1999 special citation from the Los Angeles Film Critics Association for their role in the "re-creation and presentation" of the 1924 film Greed (film) directed by Erich Von Stroheim. The Hollywood Film Awards honored Mayer for his preservation work in 2003. In 2004, Mayer won an Emmy Award for the TV documentary Judy Garland: By Myself, which he executive produced for American Masters.

In 2005, Mayer was awarded the Jean Hersholt Humanitarian Award of the Academy of Motion Picture Arts and Sciences, in recognition of his efforts for film preservation and for the Motion Picture & Television Fund. At the 77th Academy Awards ceremony, Mayer's Hersholt Award was presented by film director Martin Scorsese, who had been one of Mayer's critics on the colorization issue, but who praised Mayer for his preservation work.

== Personal life ==
Mayer married Pauline Alexander in 1952; they remained married until his death. They had two children. He died after suffering a heart attack in his doctor's office in Los Angeles on March 24, 2015.
