= Grain Media =

British film and television production company

- Type: Production company
- Industry: television, film
- Genre: Film, TV, Commercials
- Founded: 2006
- Headquarters: London, United Kingdom
- Key people: Orlando von Einsiedel
- Website: www.grainmedia.co.uk

Grain Media is a British film and television production company based in London, United Kingdom. The company was founded in 2006 and is run by British film director and producer Orlando von Einsiedel. It is known for its documentary storytelling, focusing on social issues, environmental conservation, and human rights. Grain Media has received critical acclaim for its work, winning two Academy Awards, a Primetime Emmy, a Peabody Award, and multiple BAFTAs.

== History ==
Grain Media was established in 2006 by British filmmakers Orlando von Einsiedel and Jon Drever. The company initially gained recognition through its extreme sports content, producing the TV magazine show Gene-x for the Extreme Sports Channel. Over time, it shifted its focus to social and geopolitical documentary filmmaking.

Grain Media gained international prominence with the release of the 2014 feature documentary Virunga, which was nominated for the Academy Award for Best Documentary Feature and won a Primetime Emmy a Peabody Award and a du-Pont Colombia Award for outstanding journalism. The company's reputation was further solidified with the Academy Award-winning short documentaries The White Helmets (2016) and Learning to Skateboard in a Warzone (If You're a Girl) (2019).

== Notable Films and Documentaries ==
=== Feature Documentaries ===
- Virunga (2014) – A documentary on conservation efforts against the actions of a British oil company in Virunga National Park in the Democratic Republic of Congo. Nominated for an Academy Award.
- Evelyn (2018) – A personal documentary by von Einsiedel about mental health and suicide in his family. Winner of the British Independent Film Award for Best Documentary.
- The Lost Children / Los Niños Perdidos (2024) – A documentary about the rescue of four Indigenous children lost in the Amazon after a plane crash. It was nominated for a Premios Platino Award for Best Documentary and appeared in the Netflix Global Top Ten most watched films list for a number of weeks.
- Buy Now! The Shopping Conspiracy (2024) – A documentary about the manipulative tricks used by the world’s biggest brands to keep customers consuming. The film featured in the Netflix Global Top Ten most watched films list for a number of weeks.

=== Short Documentaries ===
- The White Helmets (2016) – A documentary on volunteer rescue workers in Syria. Winner of the Academy Award for Best Documentary (Short Subject).
- Learning to Skateboard in a Warzone (If You're a Girl) (2019) – A documentary about Afghan girls learning to skateboard. Winner of the Academy Award for Best Documentary Short Subject and BAFTA for Best Short Film.
- From Devil’s Breath (2021) – A short film exploring the connection between wildfires and climate change produced by Leonardo DiCaprio.
- Lost And Found (2019) – A documentary about efforts to reunite Rohingya refugee children with their families. Winner of the AFI Fest Audience Award. And was nominated for Best Short Documentary at the News and Documentary Emmy Awards.
- Skateistan: To Live And Skate Kabul (2010) – A short documentary about Afghanistan’s first skateboard school, Skateistan.

=== Television Productions ===
- I Cut Off His Penis (2024, ITV) – A documentary about penicide, and the gender based violence that frequently precedes it.
- Heart of Invictus (2022, Netflix) – A documentary series produced in collaboration with Prince Harry's Archewell Productions, focusing on wounded veterans competing in the Invictus Games.
- Death in Bollywood (2021, BBC Two) – A documentary series investigating the death of Bollywood actress Jiah Khan.
- India’s Forbidden Love (2020, Al Jazeera English,2020) – A documentary about honor-based violence in India. Nominated for an International Emmy Award.
- The Nobel Peace Prize (National Geographic Documentary Films, 2020) – A documentary anthology series about the legacy of the Nobel Peace Prize
- Tigers: Hunting the Traffickers (2020, BBC Two) – An investigative documentary about the illegal tiger trade.

== Branded Content and Commercial Work ==
Grain Media has worked on branded content for organizations including:

- The Nobel Prize
- Nike
- New Balance
- Samsung
- Google
- Amnesty International
- The United Nations
- Al Jazeera English

== Impact and Recognition ==
Grain Media has played a role in social and environmental advocacy through its films and has been recognized with social impact awards including a Peabody Award, a Doc Impact Award and a Television Academy Honor. The company's documentaries have been screened at global venues, including:

- The United Nations
- Capitol Hill
- Houses of parliament Parliament UK
- The European Union
- The world Bank

The company's work has been recognized by public figures such as Leonardo DiCaprio, George Clooney, and former U.S. Ambassador to the UN Samantha Power.

== Awards and Accolades ==
Grain Media has received more than 150 international awards, including:

- India Catalina Award for Best Documentary – The Lost Children / Los Niños Perdidos (2025).
- Academy Award for Best Documentary Short Subject – The White Helmets (2017), Learning to Skateboard in a Warzone (If You’re a Girl) (2020).
- BAFTA Award – Learning to Skateboard in a Warzone (If You’re a Girl) (2020)
- Peabody Award – Virunga (2015)
- British Independent Film Award (BIFA) – Evelyn (2018)
- International Documentary Association Award for Best Short Documentary – The White Helmets (2016), Learning to Skateboard in a Warzone (If You’re a Girl) (2019)
- AFI Fest Audience Award – Lost and Found (2019)
- The One Show Bronze Pencil Award – We Are Fire (2016)
- Primetime Emmy Award for Outstanding Cinematography For Nonfiction Programming– Virunga (2015)
- duPont-Colombia Award For Outstanding Journalism – Virunga (2014)
- Grierson Awards Best Cinema Documentary – Virunga (2014)

=== Selected award nominations: ===
- Premios Platino Awards Best Documentary – The Lost Children / Los (2025)
- News and Documentary Emmys nominee Outstanding Investigative Documentary – Scouts Honor: The Secret Files of the Boy Scouts of America (2024)
- News and Documentary Emmys nominee Outstanding Current Affairs Documentary – Convergence: Courage in a Crisis (2022)
- News and Documentary Emmys nominee Outstanding Short Documentary – Learning to Skateboard in a Warzone (If You’re a Girl) (2020), Lost & Found (2020)
- Critics Choice Awards nominee Best Short Documentary – Into The Fire (2020)
- The Grierson Awards nominee Best Natural History Documentary – Tigers: Hunting The Traffickers (2020)
- British Independent Film Award (BIFA) nominee for Best Documentary – Seahorse: The Dad Who Gave Birth (2019)
- International Emmys nominee – India’s Forbidden Love (2019)
- Primetime Emmys nominee Exceptional Merit in Documentary Filmmaking - The White Helmets (2017)
- Academy Award Nominee Best Documentary Feature – Virunga (2015)
- BAFTA Film Awards nominee Best Documentary Feature – Virunga (2015)
- Directors Guild of America Awards nominee Outstanding Directorial Achievement in Documentary – Virunga (2015)
- Producers Guild of America Awards nominee Outstanding Producer of Documentary Theatrical Motion – Virunga (2015)
- Primetime Emmys nominee Outstanding Documentary or Non-fiction Special – Virunga (2015)

== Key Projects and Recent Developments ==
- The Walk (2023) – Directed by Tamara Kotevska, this feature follows a 3.5-meter puppet’s journey from the Syrian border to the UK, representing displaced children. It premiered at DOC NYC.
- Cycling For Love (upcoming) – Directed by von Einsiedel and inspired by the book The Amazing Story of the Man Who Cycled From India to Europe for Love, produced in collaboration with Kalabati Pictures.
- The Mother of All Fights – Executive produced by Grain Media, directed by Juliano Ribeiro Salgado and Ivi Roberg, about Brazilian activist Sônia Guajajara.
- Nobel Peace Prize Laureates follow-up – A collaboration with National Geographic focusing on Nobel laureates in Physiology or Medicine.

== Headquarters ==
Grain Media is based in Brockley, London, United Kingdom.

This comprehensive overview of Grain Media highlights its significant contributions to the film industry and its continued focus on creating socially impactful films that resonates globally.
