= The White Helmets (film) =

- Film poster
- Directed by: Orlando von Einsiedel
- Produced by: Joanna Natasegara
- Cinematography: Khaled Khateeb
- Production companies: Grain Media; Violet Films
- Distributed by: Netflix
- Release date: 16 September 2016
- Running time: 40 minutes
- Country: United Kingdom
- Languages: Arabic; English

The White Helmets is a 2016 British short documentary film. The film follows the daily operations of a group of volunteer rescue workers of the Syria Civil Defence, also known as the White Helmets. The film was directed by Orlando von Einsiedel and produced by Joanna Natasegara. It won the Best Documentary (Short Subject) at the 89th Academy Awards.

== Synopsis ==
The White Helmets follows three Syria Civil Defence volunteers as they work in Aleppo and across Syria. The film also follows the three men, who are part of the same unit, as they train in Turkey.

== Cast ==
- Khalid Farah
- Mohammed Farah
- Abu Omar
- Raed Saleh

== Production ==
Von Einsiedel said he first became aware of the Syria Civil Defence when he and producer Joanna Natasegara were shown grainy YouTube footage of an infant being dug out from beneath rubble in the aftermath of a bombing. After seeing the footage, Von Einsiedel reached out to the Mayday Rescue Foundation, which provides support to the White Helmets, to ask to join volunteers as they trained in Turkey. Shortly thereafter, Von Einsiedel commissioned Khaleed Khateeb, a volunteer for the Syrian Civil Defense who had been informally documenting rescue missions since 2013, to be the film's videographer.

The film is available in 21 languages and 190 countries.

"Crashing Down", an unreleased Plastic Beach track by Gorillaz featuring the Syrian National Orchestra for Arabic Music, is played during the credits.

== Reception ==
White Helmets won Best Documentary (Short Subject) at the Academy Awards in 2017, but the film's cinematographer, Khaled Khateeb, was unable to attend the awards ceremony due to being denied entry into the United States.

In December 2016 it was announced that George Clooney was in the early stages of developing a feature-length film based on the documentary. In 2017, the film received the Cinema for Peace Most Valuable Documentary of the Year Award.

The White Helmets has an approval rating of 100% on review aggregator website Rotten Tomatoes, based on 6 reviews, and an average rating of 8.50/10.
