= Pharos Energy =

English oil and gas company

Pharos Energy Plc
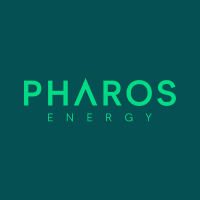
- Company type: Public company
- Traded as: LSE: PHAR
- Industry: Oil and Gas Exploration
- Founded: 1997 as Snyder Oil Corporation International
- Founder: Ed Story
- Headquarters: London, England
- Key people: John Martin, Chair; Ed Story, CEO
- Revenue: ▼$114.6 million (2025)
- Operating income: ▼$8.7 million (2025)
- Net income: ▼$(6.6) million (2025)
- Website: www.pharos.energy

Pharos Energy Plc, previously SOCO International, is an oil and gas exploration and production company, headquartered in London. The company changed its name to Pharos Energy Plc in October 2019 after coming under fire for illegal activity in Virunga.

The company is listed on the London Stock Exchange and currently has interests in Egypt, Israel and Vietnam. The company previously held interests in the Republic of Congo and Angola. Pharos Energy no longer holds interests in Africa, and their strategy now focuses on interests in the Middle East and Asia.

== History ==
In April 1997, the company was founded by Ed Story and was first listed on the London Stock Exchange in May that year. Ed Story has been CEO of Pharos Energy PLC since it was established.

During 2010, the company aimed to derisk 600 million barrels of potential net recoverable reserves with a drilling programme focused in Vietnam and the Democratic Republic of Congo.

In 2014 the company explored for oil in Virunga National Park, a UNESCO World Heritage Site in the DRC, and attempted to bribe and intimidate people who opposed their efforts. Following international pressure they agreed to suspend further exploration.

On 16 October 2019 the company announced that it had changed its name to Pharos Energy plc.

On 17 October 2019, Pharos Energy plc announced the appointment of John Martin, to succeed Rui de Sousa as Non-Executive Chair following his retirement.

== Current operations ==
=== Vietnam ===
Pharos has been active in Vietnam since 1996 and currently has two oil and gas producing blocks in the country: Block 9-2 of the (Ca Ngu Vang field) and Block 16-1 of the (Te Giac Trang field).

In May 1999, the Group signed the petroleum contract for Block 16–1 in Vietnam and the Block 9-2 petroleum contract was signed a year later in 2000.

In 2002, the Group farmed out 50% of its Vietnam interests to PTT Exploration and Production Co. (PTTEP). In the same year, the Ca Ngu Vang (CNC) Field from Block 9-2 was discovered.

In 2005, the Te Giac Trang (TGT) Field was discovered in Block 16–1.

In 2020, Pharos announced that evaluation of the offshore Phu Khanh basin blocks 125 & 126 would continue, though planned 3D seismic work would be deferred, possibly until 2021.

=== Egypt ===
In September 2018, the Company reached an agreement to buy Merlon Petroleum El Fayum Company and 100 percent of the El Fayum concession, completing the acquisition in April 2019.

In 2020, Pharos announced plans to evaluate the North Beni Suef concession and to target CO_{2} emission reduction at the El Fayum concession.

=== Israel ===
In October 2019, Israel's Energy Ministry granted Pharos, along with Cairn Energy and Ratio Oil, eight offshore exploration licenses for offshore blocks.

== Previous operations ==
=== MENA ===
==== Tunisia ====
In 1998, production in Tunisia commenced from the Didon field until the company let go of its Didon/Zarat interests in Tunisia in 2004.

==== Yemen ====
In 2008 the company agreed to sell its operations in Yemen to Sinochem for $US465 million.

=== Sub-Saharan Africa ===
==== Angola ====
From July 2007, SOCO held a 17% interest in Cabinda Onshore North Block, in the North Congo Basin, onshore western Cabinda in Angola. In 2016, the company sold its Angola interests to Quill Trading Corporation and WMLC Resources for US$5 million.

==== Congo Brazzaville ====
The Group entered Brazzaville, Congo, following the signing of the Production Sharing Agreement in Block Marine XI in 2006. In February 2016, the company started drilling the Baobab Marine-1 well in the Mer Profonde Sud block offshore the Congo Brazzaville – Marine XI. The well targeted gross prospective recoverable resources of 330 million barrels of oil. In 2018, the Company sold its interests in Congo Brazzaville for $US10 million to Coastal Energy.

==== Democratic Republic of the Congo ====
SOCO's operations in eastern Democratic Republic of Congo in the Onshore North Congo Basin commenced in 2013 with a short bathymetry study of Lake Edward and ceased in August 2014, in accordance with its June 2014 public commitment.

In 2012 SOCO began to explore for oil in the Virunga National Park, Democratic Republic of the Congo, a UNESCO World Heritage Site which is home to 200 of the remaining 700 endangered mountain gorilla. SOCO said it was not drilling for oil and had no plans to drill. Drilling was strongly opposed and condemned by the World Wide Fund for Nature. In 2010 SOCO received a Presidential decree from the Democratic Republic of Congo (DRC) to explore for hydrocarbons in Block V, in the southern Albertine Graben, onshore eastern DRC. Block V encompassed an area of the Virunga National Park, a World Heritage Site, including a part of Lake Edward. SOCO had advised that Block V was not located close to the Mikeno Section, which is home to the mountain gorillas.

In January 2011 SOCO employees allegedly forced their way into the Park, resulting in the conservation head of the park and several international agencies declaring their intention to bring lawsuits against SOCO. SOCO's share price subsequently fell. SOCO's Deputy Chief Executive Officer Roger Cagle said at the time that "The forcible entry is blatantly false." Cagle said SOCO was with a provincial member of parliament and had permission to enter the park.

In September 2011 former Minister Jose Endundo passed an order giving SOCO the authorisation to conduct the evaluation of hydrocarbons in the context of the Strategic Environmental Evaluation.

In June 2014, SOCO signed a joint declaration with the World Wildlife Fund, saying it would not drill in Virunga "unless UNESCO and the D.R.C. government agree that such activities are not incompatible with its World Heritage status". However, SOCO did not immediately relinquish its operating permits or commit to an unconditional withdrawal..."They’re leaving the door open," said Zach Abraham, director of the World Wildlife Fund's global campaigns. They at the time supposedly told the government they were planning to stay in the hope that the park borders would be changed.

In a statement, Ed Story, SOCO's chief executive in 2017, said: “Hopefully we can all get back to activities focused on both people and the environment where it does the most good for a place that we think can have a better future.”

By July 2018, the group no longer held any African investments besides Egypt.

=== Asia ===
==== Mongolia ====
In 2005, the company sold its Mongolian assets to PetroChina Subsidiary, Daqing Oilfield Limited Company.

==== Thailand ====
SOCO began the first production of oil from the Bualuang Oil Field in Thailand in 2008.

In 2010 the company agreed to sell its Thailand assets to UK listed Salamander Energy for $US105m.
