= White Horse Pictures =

American film and television production company

- Industry: Documentary; Film; Television
- Founded: 2014; 12 years ago
- Headquarters: Beverly Hills, California
- Key people: Nigel Sinclair (Non-Executive chairman); Nicholas Ferrall (Chairman & CEO); Jeanne Elfant Festa (Co-President); Cassidy Hartmann (Co-President)
- Website: www.whitehorsepics.com

White Horse Pictures is an American film, documentary and television production company founded in 2014.

The company is run by four partners and producers, Nigel Sinclair, Nicholas Ferrall, Jeanne Elfant Festa and Cassidy Hartmann.

== History ==
White Horse Pictures was founded in 2014 by Nigel Sinclair alongside longtime business partner Guy East with partners Nicholas Ferrall, Jeanne Elfant Festa and Cassidy Hartmann. Sinclair's previous documentaries had included Martin Scorsese’s, George Harrison: Living in the Material World which won two Emmy Awards and was nominated for a BAFTA, the Grammy Award-winning No Direction Home: Bob Dylan, the Academy Award-winning Undefeated and the Grammy Award-winning Foo Fighters: Back and Forth.

White Horse Pictures' first documentary, A Faster Horse, directed by David Gelb, was released in 2015.

In 2016, the team produced and sold worldwide The Beatles: Eight Days a Week, directed by Ron Howard and written by Mark Monroe, which won a Grammy for Best Music Film and multiple Emmy Awards. The film was Hulu's first documentary acquisition.

The following year, White Horse Pictures alongside content creation platform Tongal produced Mole Man, directed by Guy Fiorita. The documentary captured the story of Ron Heist, a 66-year-old autistic man who spent preceding five decades building a 50-room structure in his parents’ backyard. The film would debut at DOC NYC in November 2017, before premiering nationally on Sundance Now in spring 2019.

White Horse Pictures subsequently produced The Apollo directed by Roger Ross Williams – which opened the Tribeca Film Festival in April 2019 to overwhelming critical acclaim – where upon release on HBO the film was shortlisted for the Academy Award for Best Documentary. The Apollo won Outstanding Documentary at the 72nd Primetime Creative Arts Emmy Awards.

Also in 2019 was Pavarotti, directed by Ron Howard and written by Mark Monroe, which was sold to CBS Films and grossed $8,083,942, becoming one of the top 20 highest-grossing (domestic) concert films of all time.

In 2020, White Horse Pictures produced The Bee Gees: How Can You Mend a Broken Heart on HBO, directed by Frank Marshall and written by Mark Monroe where it received critical acclaim and nominations for six Emmy Awards including Outstanding Documentary, winning one.

White Horse Pictures produced Lucy and Desi, directed and produced by Amy Poehler in her documentary directorial debut and written by Mark Monroe, on Amazon Prime Video where it received critical acclaim and was nominated for six Emmy Awards, winning two. The 74th Primetime Creative Arts Emmy Awards ceremony represented the third year in a row White Horse Pictures produced a documentary nominated for the Emmy Award for Outstanding Documentary.

In 2024, White Horse Pictures produced the authorized documentary The Beach Boys, directed and produced by Frank Marshall, written by Mark Monroe and distributed by Disney. That same year, White Horse Pictures also released the Peabody Award-winning docuseries Stax: Soulsville, U.S.A. directed and produced by Jamila Wignot about the rise and fall of Stax Records. Both received positive reviews and nominations at the 76th Primetime Creative Arts Emmy Awards, with The Beach Boys winning for Outstanding Sound Mixing for a Nonfiction Program (Single or Multi-Camera).

The following year, White Horse Pictures co-produced with Paradine Productions a six-part Sky Studios documentary series David Frost Vs, anchored around interviews with journalist and television host David Frost. David Frost Vs aired in the UK in February 2025 and was acquired by MSNBC Films for the US, where it aired in April 2025. White Horse Pictures produced a documentary about the ventriloquist and children's entertainer Shari Lewis and her famous puppet, Lamb Chop, Shari & Lamb Chop, directed Lisa D'Apolito. The film debuted at Doc NYC and the North American distribution rights were acquired by Kino Lorber, who began releasing the film in limited theatrical release in July 2025. White Horse Pictures was the sales agent on a documentary commissioned by CBC about the Lilith Fair festival, Lilith Fair: Building a Mystery, directed by Ally Pankiw and produced by Dan Levy. The film was acquired by ABC News Studios, and had its world premiere at the 50th Toronto International Film Festival in September 2025, followed by a release on CBC in Canada on September 17, with Hulu & Disney+ in the US and Disney+ internationally on September 21.

White Horse Pictures produced a documentary on keyboardist, singer and songwriter Billy Preston, Billy Preston: That's The Way God Planned It, directed by Paris Barclay. The film opened in select North American markets in 2026, with the U.S theatrical premiere beginning February 20 at the Film Forum in New York City. Later in 2026, White Horse Pictures also produced a documentary on Pete Townshend of The Who entitled Pete Townshend: Behind Blue Eyes, co-directed by Frank Marshall and Nigel Sinclair, and written by Cassidy Hartmann, which had its world premiere at the 53rd edition of the Telluride Film Festival. White Horse Pictures is also producing an upcoming documentary on actor Gene Wilder directed by Chris Smith, entitled Wilder, which had world premiere at the 34th Hamptons International Film Festival in October 2026. The film is slated to premiere in North America through PBS American Masters on December 29, 2026.

In 2027, White Horse Pictures is slated to release the first authorized feature-length documentary on English rock band Def Leppard, entitled Long Live Def Leppard, directed by Jeff Feuerzeig. The North American rights were acquired by Bleecker Street's event cinema division Crosswalk, with a plan to release the film theatrically in early 2027. White Horse Pictures is also producing, alongside The Kennedy/Marshall Company, an upcoming authorized Apple TV documentary on Fleetwood Mac, directed and produced by Frank Marshall and written by Mark Monroe.Entitled Fleetwood Mac: The Chain, the film is dated to be released globally on January 29, 2027.

== Filmography ==
Documentary

Year	Film	Director(s)	Distributor
2015	A Faster Horse	David Gelb	FilmRise
2016	The Beatles: Eight Days a Week - The Touring Years	Ron Howard	Hulu
2017	Mole Man	Guy Fiorita	Sundance Now
2019	The Apollo	Roger Ross Williams	HBO
2019	Pavarotti	Ron Howard	CBS Films
2020	The Bee Gees: How Can You Mend a Broken Heart	Frank Marshall	HBO
2022	Lucy and Desi	Amy Poehler	Amazon Prime Video
2024	The Beach Boys	Frank Marshall	Disney+
2025	Shari & Lamb Chop	Lisa D'Apolito	Kino Lorber
2025	Lilith Fair: Building a Mystery	Ally Pankiw	ABC News Studios, CBC, Hulu
2026	Billy Preston: That's The Way God Planned It	Paris Barclay	Abramorama (North American Theatrical)
2026	Pete Townshend: Behind Blue Eyes	Frank Marshall and Nigel Sinclair	
2026	Wilder	Chris Smith	PBS (North American broadcast)
2027	Fleetwood Mac: The Chain	Frank Marshall	Apple TV
2027	Long Live Def Leppard	Jeff Feuerzeig	Bleecker Street (North America)

Television

Year	Program	Director(s)	Distributor
2024	Stax: Soulsville U.S.A.	Jamila Wignot	HBO
2025	David Frost Vs	Liz Mermin, Francis Longhurst, Marion Milne, Matthew Hill, Tom McCarthy	Sky
2025	David Frost Vs	Liz Mermin, Francis Longhurst, Marion Milne, Matthew Hill, Tom McCarthy	MSNBC

== Awards ==
=== Emmy Awards ===
Programs produced by White Horse Pictures partners have won eight Emmy Awards from 21 nominations. Below is a list of selected Emmy nominations by White Horse Pictures original programming.

(Wins Bolded)

Category	Nominations
Outstanding Documentary or Nonfiction Special	2017: The Beatles: Eight Days A Week - The Touring Years; 2020: **The Apollo**; 2021: The Bee Gees: How Can You Mend a Broken Heart; 2022: Lucy and Desi
Outstanding Documentary or Nonfiction Series	2024: STAX: Soulsville, U.S.A.
Outstanding Directing for a Documentary/Nonfiction Program	2021: The Bee Gees: How Can You Mend a Broken Heart; 2022: Lucy and Desi
Outstanding Writing for a Nonfiction Program	2017: The Beatles: Eight Days A Week - The Touring Years; 2021: The Bee Gees: How Can You Mend a Broken Heart; 2022: **Lucy and Desi**
Outstanding Picture Editing for a Nonfiction Program	2017: The Beatles: Eight Days A Week - The Touring Years; 2021: **The Bee Gees: How Can You Mend a Broken Heart**; 2022: Lucy and Desi
Outstanding Sound Editing for Non-Fiction Programming (Single or Multi-Camera)	2017: **The Beatles: Eight Days A Week - The Touring Years**; 2021: **The Bee Gees: How Can You Mend a Broken Heart**; 2022: Lucy and Desi
Outstanding Sound Mixing for Non-Fiction Programming (Single or Multi-Camera)	2017: **The Beatles: Eight Days A Week - The Touring Years**; 2021: The Bee Gees: How Can You Mend a Broken Heart; 2024: **The Beach Boys**; 2024: STAX: Soulsville, U.S.A.
Outstanding Music Composition For A Documentary Series Or Special (Original Dramatic Score)	2022: **Lucy and Desi**

=== Academy Awards ===
Year	Ceremony	Category	Nominee	Result	Ref.
2021	92nd Academy Awards	Documentary Feature	The Apollo	Shortlist	
2021	92nd Academy Awards	Live Action Short	Refugee	Shortlist	

=== Grammy Awards ===
Year	Ceremony	Category	Nominee	Result	Ref.
2017	59th Grammy Awards	Best Music Film	The Beatles: Eight Days a Week	Won	
2027	69th Grammy Awards	Best Music Film	Lilith Fair: Building a Mystery - The Untold Story	Pending	

=== Peabody Awards ===
Year	Ceremony	Category	Nominee	Result	Ref.
2023	83rd Peabody Awards	Documentary	Lucy and Desi	Nominated	
2025	85th Peabody Awards	Documentary	STAX: Soulsville, U.S.A.	Won	

=== Additional Awards ===
Year	Ceremony	Category	Nominee	Result	Ref.
2016	1st Critics' Choice Documentary Awards	Best Music Documentary	The Beatles: Eight Days a Week	Won	
2019	4th Critics' Choice Documentary Awards	Best Archival Documentary	Pavarotti	Nominated	
2019	4th Critics' Choice Documentary Awards	Best Music Documentary	Pavarotti	Nominated	
2019	4th Critics' Choice Documentary Awards	Best Biographical Documentary	Pavarotti	Nominated	
2019	Two Riversides Film and Art Festival	Audience Award, First Place	Pavarotti	Won	
2022	2nd Hollywood Critics Association TV Awards	Best Streaming Documentary Television Movie	Lucy and Desi	Won	
2024	South by Southwest (SXSW)	TV Premiere Audience Award	STAX: Soulsville, U.S.A.	Won	
2024	40th IDA Documentary Awards	Best Limited Series	STAX: Soulsville, U.S.A.	Nominated	
2024	Oak Park Black Film Festival	Best Documentary	Billy Preston: That's The Way God Planned It	Won	
2025	36th Palm Springs International Film Festival	Best of Fest	Billy Preston: That's The Way God Planned It	Selected	
2025	Filmfest DC	Audience Award - Best Documentary	Billy Preston: That's The Way God Planned It	Won	
2026	42nd IDA Documentary Awards	Best Music Documentary	Billy Preston: That's The Way God Planned It	Pending	
2026	42nd IDA Documentary Awards	Best Music Documentary	Lilith Fair: Building A Mystery - The Untold Story	Pending	
2026	Webby Awards	Video & Film (Music)	Lilith Fair: Building A Mystery - The Untold Story	Won	
2026	Rockie Awards	Documentary & Factual: Arts & Culture	Lilith Fair: Building A Mystery - The Untold Story	Nominated	
2026	Canadian Screen Awards	Best Feature Length Documentary	Lilith Fair: Building A Mystery - The Untold Story	Nominated	
