= PolyGram Entertainment =

Film and television arm of Universal Music Group

- Company type: Division
- Industry: Film; Television
- Genre: Documentaries; Musicals
- Predecessor: PolyGram; PolyGram Filmed Entertainment
- Founded: February 11, 2017; 9 years ago
- Headquarters: Santa Monica, California
- Key people: David Blackman (UMG head of film and television)
- Parent: Universal Music Group
- Subsidiaries: Federal Films; Interscope Films
- Website: polygramentertainment.com

PolyGram Entertainment is the film and television unit of Dutch-American music conglomerate Universal Music Group (UMG). Established on 11 February 2017 as the successor to both PolyGram and PolyGram Filmed Entertainment and a revival of the "PolyGram" brand, PolyGram Entertainment co-produces and co-distributes music-inspired and music-themed productions featuring acclaimed UMG personalities, sub-label companies and record labels throughout its history/existence.

== Background ==
Originally defunct since 1999, the "PolyGram" brand was revived as a co-distribution label with StudioCanal on 15 September 2016 for the documentary The Beatles: Eight Days a Week. PolyGram had on its slate as its first production The Story of Motown (a documentary about the record label's cultural and historical effects). Also on its slate was the co-production and financing of Mystify (a biography of INXS frontman Michael Hutchence).

== History ==
UMG had been dabbling in the documentary field, having a hand in producing the 2015 Amy Winehouse documentary, Amy, as well as HBO's Kurt Cobain: Montage of Heck. In January 2017, UMG hired David Blackman to head its newly formed film and TV unit, reporting to Universal Music Publishing Group chairman/CEO Jody Gerson and UMG Executive Vice President Michele Anthony.

Republic Records, in working with PolyGram, appointed its first executive vice-president of film & television on 17 July 2017, to oversee film and TV projects and its Federal Films initiative. On 5 June 2018, the company announced the appointment of Daniel Inkeles to the post of Vice President, Scripted Film & Television, who moved over from a sister Vivendi company, StudioCanal, to UMG.

Lionsgate and PolyGram agreed to a multiyear first-look television deal on August 6, 2018, to develop projects for TV from UMG's portfolio of labels, artists and music, with UMG issuing the corresponding soundtracks. Universal Music Group agreed on 17 April 2019, to allow Wondery a license to use the UMG music catalog and develop story podcasts of UMG artists, which would possibly be adapted for TV or film projects. Wondery would work with all UMG labels and with its PolyGram Entertainment film and TV production unit.

== Filmography ==
=== Films ===
Release date	Title	Co-production companies	Notes
15 September 2016	The Beatles: Eight Days a Week	Apple Corps, Imagine Entertainment, White Horse Pictures, Diamond Docs and One Voice · One World	documentary UK distribution only with StudioCanal
7 June 2019	Pavarotti	Decca Records, Imagine Entertainment and White Horse Pictures	documentary Co-financiers: PolyGram, CBS Films; International sales rights: HanWay Films
5 September 2019	Once Were Brothers: Robbie Robertson and the Band	Magnolia Pictures, Imagine Documentaries, Bell Media Studios, Diamond Docs and White Pine Pictures	documentary
3 April 2020	Beastie Boys Story	Oscilloscope Laboratories, Pulse Films and Fresh Bread Films	documentary distributed by Apple TV+
30 June 2020	The Go-Go's	Fine Point Films	documentary distributed by Showtime
12 December 2020	The Bee Gees: How Can You Mend a Broken Heart	HBO Documentary Films, K/M Documentaries, White Horse Pictures and Diamond Docs	documentary distributed by HBO
21 December 2020	Ariana Grande: Excuse Me, I Love You	Den of Thieves, SB Films, Story Syndicate, Si-Fi Films and Federal Films	documentary / concert distributed by Netflix
15 October 2021	The Velvet Underground	Killer Films, Motto Pictures and Verve Label Group	documentary distributed by Apple TV+
1 December 2021	Zoey's Extraordinary Christmas	Zijuatanejo Productions, The Tannenbaum Company, Feigco Entertainment and Lionsgate Television	musical comedy-drama distributed by The Roku Channel
28 October 2022	Louis Armstrong's Black & Blues	Imagine Documentaries and Apple Studios	documentary distributed by Apple TV+
20 May 2023	Love to Love You, Donna Summer	HBO Documentary Films, Motto Pictures, Federal Films and One Story Up Productions	documentary distributed by HBO
2024	Billy Preston: That's the Way God Planned It	Concord Originals, Homegrown Pictures, Impact Partners, Chicago Media Project, Play/Action Pictures, Sobey Road Pictures, UTA Independent Film Group and White Horse Pictures	documentary
27 February 2026	Man on the Run	Amazon MGM Studios, Tremolo, and MPL Communications	documentary distributed by Prime Video

=== Television ===
Year	Series	Production partner	Original network/channel	Notes
2018–2019	Motown Magic	Grace - A Storytelling Company, Beyond Entertainment, EMI Music Publishing and Sony-ATV Music Publishing	Netflix	Animation
2018	Ariana Grande: Dangerous Woman Diaries	Good Story Entertainment and Federal Films	YouTube Premium	Documentary / Concert
2019	Wu-Tang Clan: Of Mics and Men	Showtime Documentary Films, Mass Appeal, Sony Music Entertainment and Endeavor Content	Showtime	Documentary
2020–2021	Zoey's Extraordinary Playlist	Zijuatanejo Productions, The Tannenbaum Company, Feigco Entertainment, Lionsgate Television and Universal Television	NBC	Musical comedy-drama
2021	The Beatles: Get Back	Walt Disney Pictures, Apple Corps and WingNut Films	Disney+	Documentary
2021	Mr. A & Mr. M: The Story of A&M Records	Interscope Films, K/M Documentaries and Universal Music Publishing Group	Epix	Documentary
2023	Dear Mama	Defiant Ones Media Group, Amaru Entertainment, DreamCrew Entertainment, MACRO, Interscope Films and FX Productions	FX	Documentary
2024	James Brown: Say It Loud	Jagged Films, Inaudible Films, Two One Five Entertainment and Warner Music Entertainment	A&E	Documentary
2024	Stax: Soulsville U.S.A.	Concord Originals, HBO Documentary Films, Warner Music Entertainment, Laylow Pictures and White Horse Pictures	HBO	Documentary
2024	Pop Star Academy: KATSEYE	HYBE, Interscope Films and Boardwalk Pictures	Netflix	Documentary
2025	The Greatest	Outlier Society	Amazon MGM Studios	Series
