= Michael Rosenberg (film producer) =

American film industry executive and producer

Michael Rosenberg is an American film industry executive and producer. is the Co-Chair of Imagine Entertainment, founded by Oscar-winning producer Brian Grazer and Oscar-winning director Ron Howard.

== Career ==
In 1980, Rosenberg was executive vice president of Fantasy Films. Rosenberg was President of the Saul Zaentz Production Company and Fantasy Films in Berkeley, California for ten years, during which time the company released One Flew Over the Cuckoo's Nest, Amadeus, and The English Patient. Rosenberg joined Imagine Entertainment in 1988 as Vice President of Marketing and Distribution. He organized the release of many films, including Parenthood, Backdraft, Apollo 13, Ransom and The Nutty Professor.

In 1998, Rosenberg was promoted to President of Imagine Entertainment. He continued to oversee the marketing, publicity and distribution of the company's films including Best Picture Oscar winner A Beautiful Mind, as well as 8 Mile, Friday Night Lights, Inside Man, The Da Vinci Code, American Gangster, Frost / Nixon, J. Edgar and Rush and television programs including National Geographic Channel's Geinus Anthology series, Hulu's Wu-Tang: An American Saga, Fox's hit Golden Globe and Emmy award-winning Best Drama Series 24 and Empire, Fox's Emmy award-winning Best Comedy Arrested Development, WB's Felicity, ABC's Sports Night, NBC's Friday Night Lights and Parenthood, as well as HBO's "From the Earth to the Moon", which won the Emmy for Outstanding Mini-Series.

Rosenberg co-produced the 84th Academy Awards show for ABC in 2012. He also served as a producer the critically acclaimed documentaries Pavarotti and Katy Perry: Part of Me, and as an executive producer for the National Geographic series Mars and Breakthrough, the 2017 Grammy and Emmy award-winning documentary The Beatles: Eight Days a Week, Dads, Rebuilding Paradise, Once Were Brothers: Robbie Robertson and The Band, and D. Wade: Life Unexpected.

Currently, Rosenberg served as executive producer on Music by John Williams, celebrating the legendary composer's cinematic influence, and Jim Henson: Idea Man, which explores Henson's legacy beyond The Muppets and Sesame Street. Rosenberg also was a producer on Lucy and Desi, and executive produced Julia and We Feed People.

Rosenberg has been actively involved with multiple philanthropic organizations including The Fulfillment Fund, David Geffen School of Medicine at UCLA, USC School of Cinematic Arts, American Film Institute, The Help Group, Best Buddies International, and the Memorial Sloan Kettering Cancer Center.

=== Accolades ===
| Year | Award | Category | Nominee(s) | Result | Ref. |
|---|---|---|---|---|---|
| 2022 | Peabody Awards | Documentary | Lucy and Desi | Nominated | |
