= Nigel Sinclair =

British film producer (born 1948)

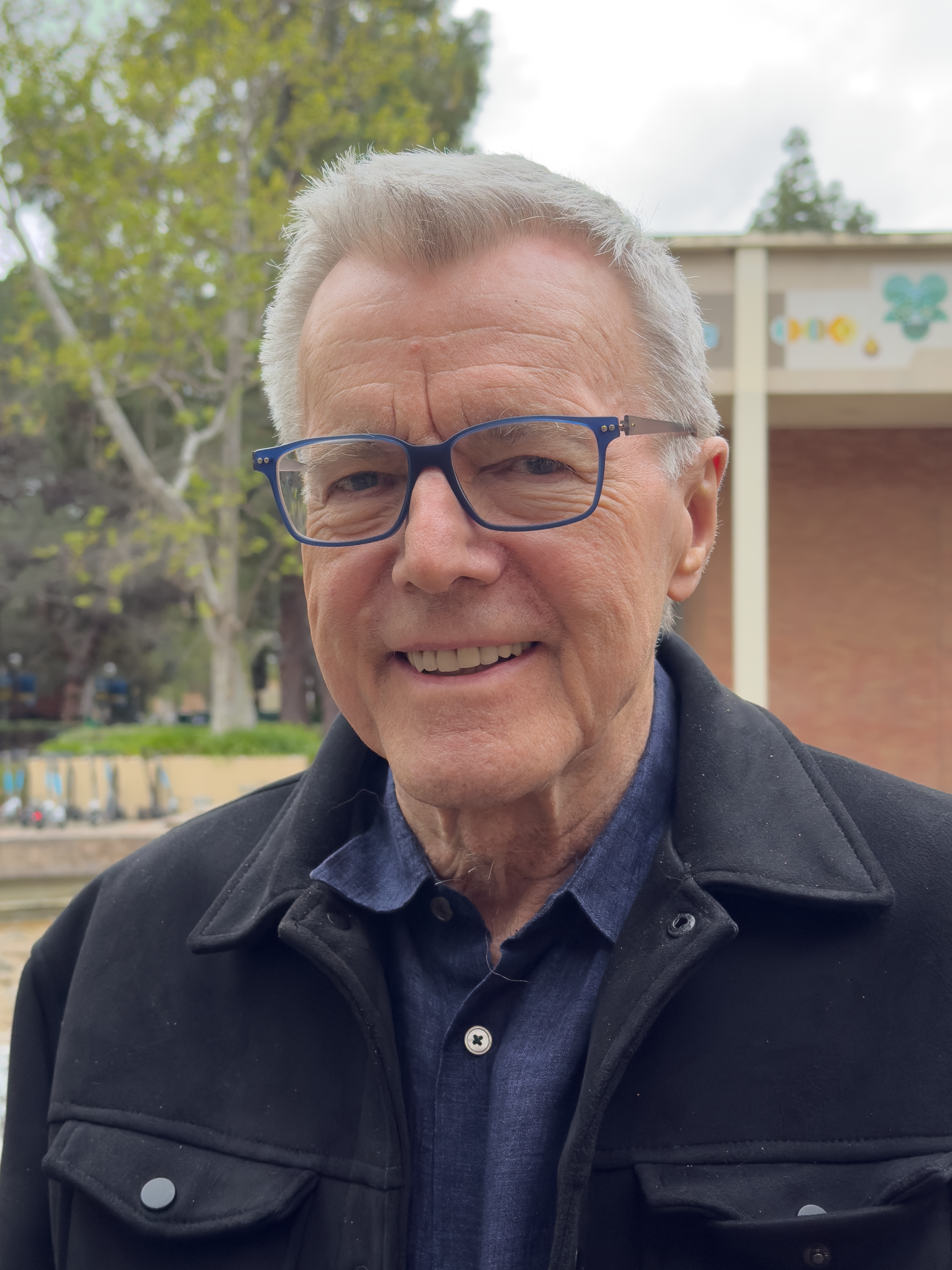
- Sinclair in 2025
- Born: March 31, 1948 (age 78); Corbridge, Northumberland, England
- Education: University of Cambridge
- Occupation: Film producer
- Spouse: Patricia Sinclair

Nigel Sinclair, CBE (born 31 March 1948) is a British producer of Hollywood films.

== Early life ==
Sinclair was born in Corbridge, Northumberland, England. His family moved to Galloway, in southwest Scotland, a few years later where he grew up. He went to boarding school at Monkton Combe School in England. In 1966, he attended Gonville and Caius College, Cambridge, graduating in 1969. After a short stint working as a researcher for the Department of Criminology, University of Cambridge, he qualified as a lawyer with the London firm then known as Denton, Hall and Burgin. He practiced law in London and subsequently in the Middle East until 1980.

Sinclair attended Columbia University School of Law in New York and obtained a LAM in International Legal Studies, and qualified for the State Bar of California. In 1989, Sinclair founded his own firm, Sinclair Tennenbaum & Co., in Los Angeles. He practiced entertainment law until he retired from that practice in 1996 to found Intermedia with Guy East.

== Film career ==
In 2014, Sinclair founded documentary, television and film company White Horse Pictures alongside East with partners Nicholas Ferrall, Cassidy Hartmann and Jeanne Elfant Festa. With White Horse Pictures, Sinclair has produced a series acclaimed documentaries, including Ron Howard's The Beatles: Eight Days A Week - The Touring Years and Pavarotti, The Apollo (exec) directed by Roger Ross Williams, The Bee Gees: How Can You Mend a Broken Heart directed by Frank Marshall, and Amy Poehler's documentary directorial debut Lucy and Desi. In 2026, it was announced that Sinclair's directorial debut, a documentary on Pete Townshend of The Who entitled Pete Townshend: Behind Blue Eyes, would have its world premiere at the 53rd edition of the Telluride Film Festival. The film was co-directed with Frank Marshall.

Prior to launching White Horse Pictures, Sinclair was the CEO and co-chairman of Exclusive Media, a global independent film company that financed, produced and globally distributed feature films and documentaries. With Exclusive, Sinclair produced Parkland and End of Watch.

In addition, Sinclair was executive producer on Ron Howard's epic action-thriller Rush, set in the world of Formula 1 auto racing. Along with Michael Shevloff and Paul Crowder, Sinclair also produced the documentary 1, the authorized history of Formula 1.

Previously, Sinclair served as executive producer on George Clooney's The Ides of March, nominated for an Academy Award for Best Original Screenplay, and the Academy Award-winning documentary feature Undefeated, produced by Exclusive Media's documentary production arm Spitfire Pictures. Sinclair also served as an executive producer on the Hammer Films production and box-office hit The Woman in Black, starring Daniel Radcliffe.

Sinclair's other film credits include Peter Weir's The Way Back, starring Jim Sturgess and Ed Harris; Sliding Doors, starring Gwyneth Paltrow; Terminator 3: Rise of the Machines, starring Arnold Schwarzenegger; and Alan Parker's The Life of David Gale, starring Kevin Spacey and Kate Winslet.

Prior to co-founding Exclusive Media, Sinclair and Guy East (who is also co-chairman of White Horse Pictures), founded Intermedia Films in 1996, which grew to become one of the world's leading independent film companies. After their departure in 2002, Sinclair and East then founded Spitfire Pictures, which was merged with Hammer to form Exclusive Media in 2008.

Under the Spitfire Pictures label Sinclair produced (along with Olivia Harrison) the award-winning George Harrison: Living in the Material World, Martin Scorsese's biographical film about the life of George Harrison, which won an Emmy. He also produced the Bob Dylan documentary No Direction Home, also directed by Scorsese, which won an Emmy, two Grammy Awards, a Peabody Award and a DuPont.

In 2012, Sinclair won his second Grammy for Foo Fighters: Back and Forth and in 2007 he was nominated for a Grammy for Amazing Journey: The Story of The Who. Sinclair won his first Grammy in 2006 for No Direction Home.

His company Spitfire Pictures had been involved with Tongal since 2013, working with the company to crowd-source a documentary. According to the Los Angeles Times, Tongal users will submit pitch ideas, with Spitfire selecting the top five, and awarding one the winning idea before distributing the final project.

== Personal life ==
In 1981, Sinclair married Pat Craig and together they have one child in addition to Pat's two children.

Sinclair is active in a number of charities including the Santa Monica-based charity k9 Connection. Sinclair is a member of the Academy of Motion Picture Arts and Sciences and BAFTA, having served on the board of directors for BAFTA LA many times. Sinclair's principal hobby is as an amateur musician playing guitar and collecting guitars.

== Filmography ==
He was a producer in all films unless otherwise noted.

=== Film ===
Year	Film	Credit
1988	The Blue Iguana	Executive producer
1989	Kill Me Again	Executive producer
1989	Fear, Anxiety & Depression	
1990	Daddy's Dyin': Who's Got the Will?	Executive producer
1990	A-Ge-Man: Tales of a Golden Geisha	Executive producer
1992	Minbo	Executive producer
1993	Daibyonin	Co-executive producer
1998	Sliding Doors	Executive producer
1998	Hilary and Jackie	Executive producer
1998	Clay Pigeons	Executive producer
1998	Playing by Heart	Executive producer
1999	Whatever Happened to Harold Smith?	Executive producer
2000	Love's Labour's Lost	Executive producer
2000	Where the Money Is	Executive producer
2000	Up at the Villa	Co-executive producer
2000	Company Man	Co-executive producer
2001	Enigma	Executive producer
2001	The Wedding Planner	Executive producer
2001	Blow Dry	Executive producer
2002	K-19: The Widowmaker	Executive producer
2002	The Quiet American	Executive producer
2002	Dark Blue	Executive producer
2003	National Security	Executive producer
2003	Masked and Anonymous	
2003	The Life of David Gale	Executive producer
2003	Basic	Executive producer
2003	Terminator 3: Rise of the Machines	Executive producer
2004	Mindhunters	Executive producer
2004	Suspect Zero	Executive producer
2009	Possession	
2010	The Way Back	
2010	Let Me In	Executive producer
2011	The Resident	Executive producer
2011	The Ides of March	Executive producer
2012	The Woman in Black	Executive producer
2012	End of Watch	
2012	So Undercover	
2013	Snitch	
2013	Parkland	
2013	Rush	Executive producer
2013	Begin Again	Executive producer
2014	The Quiet Ones	Executive producer
2014	A Walk Among the Tombstones	Executive producer
2014	The Woman in Black: Angel of Death	Executive producer
2015	Dark Places	Executive producer
2023	Haunting of the Queen Mary	Producer

Documentary

Year	Film	Credit
2005	No Direction Home	
2007	Amazing Journey: The Story of The Who	
2008	The Who at Kilburn: 1977	
2010	The Last Play at Shea	
2011	Foo Fighters: Back and Forth	
2011	George Harrison: Living in the Material World	
2013	1	
2015	A Faster Horse	
2016	The Beatles: Eight Days a Week - The Touring Years	
2019	The Apollo	Executive Producer
2019	Pavarotti	
2020	The Bee Gees: How Can You Mend A Broken Heart	
2022	Lucy and Desi	
2024	The Beach Boys	Executive Producer
2025	Shari & Lamb Chop	Executive Producer
2025	Lilith Fair: Building a Mystery	Executive Producer
2026	Billy Preston: That's The Way God Planned It	
2026	Pete Townshend: Behind Blue Eyes	Director

Miscellaneous crew

Year	Film	Role
1996	Mojave Moon	Business affairs

Thanks

Year	Film	Role
1990	Wild at Heart	Special thanks
1990	Hamlet	Special thanks
1991	K2	With special thanks to
1992	1492: Conquest of Paradise	The producers wish to express their special thanks to
1995	Braveheart	The producers wish to thank
1998	The Land Girls	Thanks

=== Television ===
Year	Title	Credit	Notes
2005	American Masters	Executive Producer	Documentary
2014	From Dusk till Dawn: The Series		
2024	Stax: Soulsville U.S.A.	Executive Producer	Documentary
2025	David Frost Vs	Executive Producer	Documentary

=== Accolades ===
Year	Award	Category	Nominee(s)	Result	Ref.
2022	Peabody Awards	Documentary	Lucy and Desi	Nominated	
2024	Peabody Awards	Documentary	Stax: Soulsville U.S.A	Won	
