= Pete Townshend: Behind Blue Eyes =

- Directed by: Frank Marshall; Nigel Sinclair
- Written by: Cassidy Hartmann; Sam Bridger
- Produced by: Cassidy Hartmann; Nigel Sinclair; Sam Bridger
- Production companies: White Horse Pictures; The Kennedy/Marshall Company; Vice Studios
- Release date: 2026
- Running time: 102 minutes
- Countries: United States, United Kingdom
- Language: English

Pete Townshend: Behind Blue Eyes is a 2026 documentary film which explores the life and career of The Who guitarist Pete Townshend. It is directed by Frank Marshall and Nigel Sinclair.
