= Lucy and Desi =

2022 documentary film

- Amazon Prime release poster
- Directed by: Amy Poehler
- Written by: Mark Monroe
- Produced by: Amy Poehler; Jeanne Elfant Festa; Nigel Sinclair; Mark Monroe; Michael Rosenberg; Justin Wilkes
- Starring: Lucille Ball; Desi Arnaz
- Cinematography: Ernesto Lomeli; Axel Baumann
- Edited by: Robert A. Martinez
- Music by: David Schwartz
- Production companies: Amazon Studios; Imagine Documentaries; White Horse Pictures; Paper Kite Productions; Diamond Docs
- Distributed by: Amazon Prime Video
- Release dates: January 22, 2022 (Sundance); March 4, 2022
- Running time: 103 minutes
- Country: United States
- Language: English

Lucy and Desi is a 2022 American documentary film directed by Amy Poehler in her documentary directorial debut. The film explores the unlikely partnership and enduring legacy of one of the most prolific power couples in entertainment history, Lucille Ball and Desi Arnaz.

The film had its worldwide release on March 4, 2022 through Amazon Prime Video. It received positive reviews and was nominated for six Emmy Awards including the Emmy Award for Outstanding Documentary or Nonfiction Special, winning two.

== Synopsis ==
Lucy and Desi is a peek behind the curtain of the relationship between two trailblazers – featuring interviews with Lucie Arnaz Luckinbill, Norman Lear, Desi Arnaz Jr, Carol Burnett and Bette Midler.

== Production ==
The film is directed by Emmy Award winning actress, comedian and director Amy Poehler in her documentary directorial debut, and written by Mark Monroe. Poehler and the creative team were able to utilize never-before-heard audio interviews with Ball and Arnaz after producer Jeanne Elfant Festa discovered a box of audiotapes while exploring archival materials with Lucy and Desi's daughter, Lucie Arnaz Luckinbill. Furthermore, the production team had full access to the Ball/Arnaz estate overseen by Arnaz Luckinbill.

== Release ==
Lucy and Desi debuted at the Sundance Film Festival on January 22, 2022. The film was released worldwide on Amazon Prime Video on March 4, 2022.

== Reception ==
On the review aggregator website Rotten Tomatoes, 94% of 97 critics' reviews are positive, with an average rating of 7.3/10. The website's consensus reads: "Equal parts entertaining and informative, Lucy and Desi takes a palpably affectionate look at the lives and legacies of its groundbreaking subjects."

== Awards and nominations ==
Year	Award	Category	Nominee(s)	Result	Ref.
2022	Hollywood Critics Association TV Awards	Best Streaming Documentary Television Movie	Lucy and Desi	Won	
2022	Primetime Emmy Awards	Outstanding Music Composition for a Documentary Series or Special (Original Dramatic Score)	David Schwartz	Won	
2022	Primetime Emmy Awards	Outstanding Writing for a Nonfiction Program	Mark Monroe	Won	
2022	Primetime Emmy Awards	Outstanding Directing for a Documentary/Nonfiction Program	Amy Poehler	Nominated	
2022	Primetime Emmy Awards	Outstanding Picture Editing for a Nonfiction or Reality Program (Single or Multi-Camera)	Robert A. Martinez, Dan Reed and Inaya Graciana Yusuf	Nominated	
2022	Primetime Emmy Awards	Outstanding Sound Editing for a Nonfiction or Reality Program (Single or Multi-Camera)	Anthony Vanchure, Daniel Pagan, Mike James Gallagher, Jason Tregoe Newman, Bryant J. Fuhrmann	Nominated	
2022	Primetime Emmy Awards	Outstanding Documentary/Nonfiction Program	Michael Rosenberg, Justin Wilkes, Jeanne Elfant Festa, Nigel Sinclair, Amy Poehler, and Mark Monroe, produced by	Nominated	
2022	Critics' Choice Documentary Awards	Best First Documentary Feature	Amy Poehler	Nominated	
2022	Critics' Choice Documentary Awards	Best Biographical Documentary	Amazon Studios	Nominated	
2022	Critics' Choice Documentary Awards	Best Score	David Schwartz	Nominated	
2022	Peabody Awards	Documentary	Amazon Studios, Imagine Documentaries, White Horse Pictures in association with Paper Kite Productions and Diamond Docs (Prime Video)	Nominated	
2023	Producers Guild of America Awards	Outstanding Producer of Non-Fiction Television	Amazon	Nominated	
2023	Writers Guild of America Awards	Documentary Script – Other than Current Events	Mark Monroe (Prime Video)	Nominated	
