= Billy Preston: That's the Way God Planned It =

- Theatrical release poster
- Directed by: Paris Barclay
- Written by: Paris Barclay; Cheo Hodari Coker
- Produced by: Stephanie Allain; Jeanne Elfant Festa; Nigel Sinclair; Cheo Hodari Coker
- Production company: White Horse Pictures Homegrown Pictures
- Distributed by: Abramorama
- Release dates: March 14, 2024 (SXSW Austin); February 20, 2026 (North America)
- Running time: 105 minutes
- Country: United States
- Language: English
- Box office: $77,771

Billy Preston: That's the Way God Planned It is a 2024 documentary written by Paris Barclay and Cheo Hodari Coker and directed by Barclay, released in select North American markets beginning February 20, 2026. It documents the life of keyboardist, singer and songwriter Billy Preston, from his early years as a child prodigy to his death in 2006.

== Production ==
The film was produced by White Horse Pictures and Homegrown Pictures, and presented by Concord Originals, Impact Partners, Play/Action Pictures and Chicago Media Project in association with Sobey Road Entertainment, DK Films and Polygram Entertainment.

UTA Independent Film Group with White Horse Pictures helped raise the funding and broker sales of the film.

== Release and reception ==
The film released into select theaters beginning February 20, 2026, debuting at the New York City movie theater Film Forum. In a review of the film for Variety when it was showcased at the SXSW in Austin, critic Owen Gleiberman wrote "as the documentary reveals, Billy Preston was an elusive figure — ebullient and all there, and also hidden and mysterious", noting that "Just when you’re think you’re watching an upbeat pop doc, the dark side of Billy Preston’s life comes crashing in. And is it ever dark." For The New York Times, critic Glenn Kenny wrote "the music that buoys this chronicle is a constant source of joy."

The film was previously hit with a fraud lawsuit that the film overcame; Paris Barclay told Deadline that "This meritless complaint, which reeks of homophobia and attempts at blatant censorship, is a sad reminder that his story is more important than ever to tell."

On the review aggregator website Rotten Tomatoes, 90% of 10 critics' reviews are positive.
