= Mole Man (documentary) =

American Documentary FIlm

- Directed by: Guy Fiorita
- Produced by: James DeJulio; Cassidy Hartmann; Nicholas Ferrall
- Starring: Ron Heist
- Edited by: Duncan Adams; Guy Fiorita; Robert A. Martinez
- Production companies: White Horse Pictures; Tongal; Archer Gray
- Distributed by: SundanceNow
- Release dates: November 10, 2017 (DOC NYC); May 10, 2019
- Running time: 85 minutes
- Country: United States

Mole Man is a 2017 documentary film about Ron Heist, a 66-year-old autistic man who spent the preceding five decades building a 50-room structure in his parents’ backyard. The film was directed by Guy Fiorita and produced by James DeJulio, Cassidy Hartmann and Nicholas Ferrall.

== Production ==
Mole Man first developed in September 2013 as the winning submission for a pitch competition with Tongal to crowd-source a documentary, and was a co-production between production company White Horse Pictures, content creation platform Tongal, and Archer Gray.

== Release ==
Mole Man debuted at DOC NYC on November 10, 2017 as a finalist for the Viewfinders Grand Jury Prize, and later won Best Documentary at the 2018 Pittsburgh Independent Film Festival. The film later became available on SundanceNow through video-on-demand in spring 2019.

In a review of the film, New York-based film critic John Fink wrote "Mole Man is a fascinating, warm and, occasionally heartbreaking film."

== Legacy ==
Ron passed away in March, 2023 at the age of 72.

In 2026, renewed interest in the film on social media led to interviews with director/writer/editor Guy Fiorita revisiting the documentary, discussing Ron's life after the events of the documentary and the film's lasting impact.
