= The Bee Gees: How Can You Mend a Broken Heart =

2020 documentary film about the Bee Gees

- Release poster
- Directed by: Frank Marshall
- Written by: Mark Monroe
- Produced by: Frank Marshall; Jeanne Elfant Festa; Nigel Sinclair; Mark Monroe
- Starring: The Bee Gees
- Cinematography: Ariel Grandoli; Michael Dwyer
- Edited by: Derek Boonstra; Robert A. Martinez
- Music by: The Bee Gees
- Production companies: HBO Documentary Films; PolyGram Entertainment; K/M Documentaries; White Horse Pictures; Diamond Docs
- Distributed by: HBO (United States); Universal Pictures (International)
- Release dates: December 3, 2020 (United Kingdom, Ireland, Australia and New Zealand); December 12, 2020 (United States)
- Running time: 111 minutes
- Country: United States
- Language: English
- Box office: $283,826

The Bee Gees: How Can You Mend a Broken Heart is a 2020 American documentary film, directed by Frank Marshall. It follows the life and career of the Bee Gees.

The film had a limited theatrical release in the U.K., Australia and New Zealand on December 3, 2020 with its worldwide release on December 12, 2020, through HBO Max. It received positive reviews and was nominated for six Emmy Awards, including the Emmy Award for Outstanding Documentary or Nonfiction Special.

== Synopsis ==
The film follows the life and career of brothers Barry, Robin and Maurice Gibb, the Bee Gees. It includes interviews with Barry, alongside archival interviews with Robin and Maurice, plus new interviews with Vince Melouney (former Bee Gees' guitarist during the mid-to-late 1960s) and former touring members Alan Kendall and Blue Weaver. It also features interviews with other musicians and individuals in the Bee Gees' orbit, including Lulu, Yvonne Gibb, and archival interviews with the Bee Gees' younger brother Andy Gibb.

Other musicians and individuals (outside of the Bee Gees' orbit) interviewed include Justin Timberlake, Noel Gallagher, Nick Jonas, Chris Martin, Eric Clapton, Mark Ronson, and Bill Oakes.

== Production ==
The film is directed by Emmy-nominated director Frank Marshall, and written by Mark Monroe, with Barry Gibb participating for interviews with HBO for the documentary.

== Release ==
The film was given a limited theatrical release by Universal Pictures in the U.K., Australia and New Zealand on December 3, 2020 with a release worldwide on HBO Max on December 12, 2020, in association with Polygram Entertainment.

The film was first released on DVD, digital and Blu-ray disc in the United Kingdom by Universal Pictures on December 14, 2020. Warner Bros. Home Entertainment released it on disc in the United States on November 16, 2021 with two deleted Scenes - Meeting the Bee Gees and Bands of Brothers.

== Reception ==
=== Critical response ===
The review aggregator website Rotten Tomatoes surveyed 52 critics for a 96% rating. Among the reviews, it determined an average rating of 7.7/10. The critics consensus reads "Blessed with the Bee Gees' discography and director Frank Marshall's concise thesis, How Can You Mend a Broken Heart is a poignant documentary that persuasively argues the trio's importance in music history."

=== Accolades ===
Year	Award	Category	Nominee(s)	Result	Ref.
2021	American Cinema Editors Awards	Best Edited Documentary (Non-Theatrical)	Derek Boonstra and Robert A. Martinez	Nominated	
2021	Cinema Audio Society Awards	Outstanding Achievement in Sound Mixing for a Motion Picture – Documentary	Gary A. Rizzo and Jeff King	Won	
2021	Golden Reel Awards	Outstanding Achievement in Sound Editing – Feature Documentary	Jonathan Greber and Pascal Garneau	Nominated	
2021	Philadelphia Film Festival	Best Documentary (Audience Award)	Frank Marshall	Won	
2021	Primetime Emmy Awards	Outstanding Documentary or Nonfiction Special	David Blackman, Nicholas Ferrall, Jody Gerson, Jeanne Elfant Festa, Mark Monroe, Frank Marshall, and Aly Parker	Nominated	
2021	Primetime Emmy Awards	Outstanding Directing for a Documentary/Nonfiction Program	Frank Marshall	Nominated	
2021	Primetime Emmy Awards	Outstanding Writing for a Nonfiction Programming	Mark Monroe	Nominated	
2021	Primetime Emmy Awards	Outstanding Picture Editing for Nonfiction Programming	Derek Boonstra and Robert A. Martinez	Nominated	
2021	Primetime Emmy Awards	Outstanding Sound Editing for a Nonfiction or Reality Program (Single or Multi-Camera)	Jonathan Greber and Pascal Garneau	Won	
2021	Primetime Emmy Awards	Outstanding Sound Mixing for a Nonfiction or Reality Program (Single or Multi-Camera)	Gary A. Rizzo, Jeff King, and John Rampey	Nominated	

== See also ==
- Bee Gees
- "How Can You Mend a Broken Heart"
- HBO
- HBO Max
