= A Faster Horse =

- Film poster
- Directed by: David Gelb
- Produced by: Nigel Sinclair; Glen Zipper
- Cinematography: Will Basanta
- Edited by: Isaac Hagy
- Music by: Saunder Jurriaans and Danny Bensi
- Production company: White Horse Pictures
- Distributed by: FilmRise
- Release date: October 8, 2015
- Running time: 84 minutes
- Country: United States
- Language: English

A Faster Horse is a 2015 American documentary film directed by David Gelb about the Ford Mustang. It debuted at the Tribeca Film Festival.

== Reception ==
On review aggregator website Rotten Tomatoes the film has an approval rating of 67% based on 6 critics, with an average rating of 5/10.

Michael Rechtshaffen of Los Angeles Times said that "For a documentary all about the iconic Ford Mustang, A Faster Horse is seriously lacking zip".

According to Helen T. Verongos of The New York Times, "The tidbits we learn are wrapped in an unabashedly promotional tone that overestimates the global emotional attachment to this car's muscular mythos".
