= Lilith Fair: Building a Mystery =

2025 documentary film

- Directed by: Ally Pankiw
- Produced by: Dan Levy; Christina Piovesan
- Cinematography: Nina Djacic
- Production companies: White Horse Pictures; Elevation Pictures; Chicago Media Project; Epic; Minderoo Pictures; Sobey Road Entertainment
- Distributed by: CBC; ABC News Studios; Hulu
- Release dates: September 13, 2025 (TIFF); September 17, 2025 (Canada); September 21, 2025 (United States)
- Running time: 99 minutes
- Countries: Canada; United States
- Language: English

Lilith Fair: Building a Mystery is a 2025 documentary film directed by Ally Pankiw. It follows the Lilith Fair, a music festival founded by Sarah McLachlan, which focused on female solo musicians and female-led bands. Dan Levy serves as a producer under his Not a Real Production company banner.

The documentary premiered at the Toronto International Film Festival on September 13, 2025, broadcast on CBC in Canada on September 17, 2025, and was released in the United States on September 21, 2025, by ABC News Studios and Hulu.

== Premise ==
Explores the Lilith Fair, a musical festival founded by Sarah McLachlan, which focused on female solo musicians and female-led bands. McLachlan, Paula Cole, Sheryl Crow, Brandi Carlile, Erykah Badu, Bonnie Raitt, Jewel, Indigo Girls, Mya, Natalie Merchant, and Emmylou Harris are among those interviewed.

== Production ==
In July 2024, it was announced Ally Pankiw would direct a documentary revolving around Lilith Fair, with Dan Levy set to produce. Elevation Pictures and White Horse Pictures will produce the film, with Elevation set to distribute in Canada alongside CBC.

The filmmakers drew from more than 600 hours of never-before-seen archival footage as well as new interviews and stories from fans, festival organizers, and participating artists.

== Release ==
The documentary premiered at the Toronto International Film Festival on September 13, 2025. The documentary was then broadcast on CBC in Canada on September 17, 2025, and released in the United States on September 21, 2025, by ABC News Studios and Hulu.

== Reception ==
=== Critical response ===
On the review aggregator website Rotten Tomatoes, 100% of 17 critics' reviews are positive, with an average rating of 7/10.

Chris Willman of Variety wrote, "Director Ally Pankiw does a solid job of setting up the seeds that led to Lilith becoming a cultural phenomenon and global meme."

=== Accolades ===
The film received a Canadian Screen Award nomination for Best Feature Length Documentary at the 14th Canadian Screen Awards in 2026.

| Year | Award | Category | Nominee(s) | Result | Ref. |
|---|---|---|---|---|---|
| 2026 | Cinema Audio Society Awards | Outstanding Achievement in Sound Mixing for Motion Pictures - Documentary | Steve Foster, Lana Marie Hattar | Nominated | |
| 2026 | Guild of Music Supervisors Awards | Best Music Supervision for a Documentary | Amanda Clemens, Jody Colero | Won | |
| 2026 | Webby Awards | Video & Film (Music) | Lilith Fair: Building A Mystery - The Untold Story | Won | |
| 2026 | Rockie Awards | Documentary & Factual: Arts & Culture | White Horse Pictures, Elevation Pictures, ABC News Studios, Not A Real Production Company | Nominated | |
| 2026 | Canadian Screen Awards | Best Feature Length Documentary | Dan Levy, Ally Pankiw, Christina Piovesan, Noah Segal | Nominated | |
| 2026 | Canadian Screen Awards | Visual Research | Stefanie McCarrol, Tammy Egan and Judy Ruzylo | Won | |
| 2026 | Dorian TV Awards | Best LGBTQ TV Documentary or Documentary Series | Hulu | Won | |
| 2027 | Grammy Awards | Best Music Film | Ally Pankiw, Dan Levy, Christina Piovesan | Pending | |
