= Primetime Emmy Award for Outstanding Picture Editing for a Nonfiction Program =

Television award category

- Awarded for: Outstanding Picture Editing for a Nonfiction Program
- Country: United States
- Presented by: Academy of Television Arts & Sciences
- Currently held by: Sean Combs: The Reckoning (2026)
- Website: emmys.com

The Primetime Emmy Award for Picture Editing for a Nonfiction Program is awarded to one television documentary or nonfiction series each year.

Prior to 2006, nonfiction and reality programs competed together until the Outstanding Picture Editing for Reality Programming category was created.

In the following list, the first titles listed in gold are the winners; those not in gold are nominees, which are listed in alphabetical order. The years given are those in which the ceremonies took place.

== Winners and nominations ==
=== 1970s ===
Year	Program	Episode	Nominee(s)	Network
1977	Special Classification of Outstanding Individual Achievement (Note: As a juried award, nominees had to garner 50% approval to win the award.)			
1977	NBC: The First Fifty Years (The Big Event)		Clay Cassell, George Pitts	NBC
1977	NBC: The First Fifty Years (The Big Event)		Walter Balderson, Allen Brewster, Jerry Burling, Chuck Droege, Ron Fleury, William Lorenz, Manuel Martinez, Bob Roethle, Mike Welch	NBC
1977	Life Goes to the Movies (The Big Event)		Peter C. Johnson, Robert K. Lambert	NBC
1978	Special Classification of Outstanding Individual Achievement (Note: As a juried award, nominees had to garner 50% approval to win the award. The nominee did not meet the benchmark and no award was given.)			
1978	Oscar Presents: The War Movies and John Wayne		William T. Cartwright, Jeffrey Weston	ABC
1979	Outstanding Individual Achievement - Informational Programming (Note: As a juried award, nominees had to garner 50% approval to win the award.)			
1979	Scared Straight!		Robert Niemack	Syndicated

=== 1980s ===
Year	Program	Episode	Nominees	Network
1980	Outstanding Individual Achievement - Informational Programming (Note: As a juried award, nominees had to garner 50% approval to win the award.)			
1980	The Body Human: The Body Beautiful		Robert Eisenhardt, Jane Kurson, Hank O'Karma	CBS
1980	The Nile: The Cousteau Odyssey		Henri Colpi, John Soh	PBS
1980	Outstanding Individual Achievement - Special Class (Note: As a juried award, nominees had to garner 50% approval to win the award.)			
1980	Operation: Lifeline	"Dr. James 'Red' Duke, Trauma Surgeon"	Geof Bartz	NBC
1981	Outstanding Individual Achievement - Informational Programming (Note: As a juried award, nominees had to garner 50% approval to win the award. The nominee did not meet the benchmark and no award was given.)			
1981	Cosmos	"The Shores of the Cosmic Ocean"	Roy Stewart	PBS

=== 1990s ===
Year	Program	Episode	Nominees	Network
1992	Outstanding Individual Achievement - Informational Programming (Note: As a juried award, nominees had to garner 50% approval to win the award.)			
1992	Hearts of Darkness: A Filmmaker's Apocalypse		Michael Greer, Jay Miracle	Showtime
1993	Outstanding Individual Achievement - Informational Programming (Note: As a juried award, nominees had to garner 50% approval to win the award.)			
1993	Earth and the American Dream		Gary Weimberg	HBO
1993	Mysteries Underground (National Geographic)		Barry Nye	PBS
1993	Alive: The Miracle of the Andes		Perry Schaffer	CBS
1994	Outstanding Individual Achievement - Informational Programming (Note: As a juried award, nominees had to garner 50% approval to win the award. No nominee met the benchmark and no award was given.) (Note: In 2020, the TV Academy rescinded a win in this category for the Disney Channel special George Stevens: D-Day to Berlin, edited by Catherine Shields. The program was a re-edit of the 1985 BBC documentary D-Day to Berlin, in violation of a rule that "a program that is a foreign acquisition without benefit of a domestic co-production cannot be re-introduced into eligibility in a current awards year, even though it may have been modified with new footage, sound track, musical score, etc.")			
1994	But... Seriously		Stuart Bass	Showtime
1994	The Who's Tommy: An Amazing Journey		Allyson C. Johnson	Disney
1995	Outstanding Individual Achievement - Informational Programming (Note: As a juried award, nominees had to garner 50% approval to win the award. No nominee met the benchmark and no award was given.)			
1995	A Century of Women		Sue Clarke, Craig A. Colton, Michael Mayhew, Judy Reidel	TBS
1995	Moon Shot		Aaron Fischer, Jim Ohm, Bob Sarles, Amy Young	TBS
1995	One Survivor Remembers		Lawrence Silk	HBO
1995	30 Years of National Geographic Specials		Barry Nye, Nicholas Noxon	NBC
1996	Outstanding Individual Achievement - Informational Programming (Note: As a juried award, nominees had to garner 50% approval to win the award.)			
1996	Survivors of the Holocaust		Allan Holzman	TBS
1996	American Experience	"The Battle Over Citizen Kane"	Ken Eluto	PBS
1996	The Beatles Anthology	"Part 2"	Andy Matthews	ABC
1996	The Celluloid Closet		Jeffrey Friedman and Arnold Glassman	HBO
1996	The Good, the Bad and the Beautiful		Arnold Glassman	TNT
1996	Hollywood's Amazing Animal Actors		Michael Sachs	TBS
1998 (Note: As a juried award, nominees had to garner 50% approval to win the award. No nominee met the benchmark and no award was given.)
1998	Assassinated: The Last Days of Kennedy & King		Michael Bloecher and William Haugse	TBS
1998	4 Little Girls		Sam Pollard	HBO
1998	Frank Capra's American Dream		Arnold Glassman	AMC
1998	National Geographic Special: America's Endangered Species: Don't Say Goodbye		Leonard Feinstein	NBC
1998	Trauma: Life in the E.R.	"Wrong Place, Wrong Time"	Amanda Zinoman	TLC
1998	Vietnam POWs: Stories of Survival		Mike Harvey and Graham Knight	Discovery
1999
1999	The Farm: Angola, USA		Mona Davis and Mary Manhardt	A&E
1999	Lenny Bruce: Swear to Tell the Truth		Geof Bartz and Robert B. Weide	HBO
1999	American Masters	"Leonard Bernstein: Reaching for the Note"	Deborah Peretz	PBS
1999	Biography	"The Rat Pack"	Luke Sacher	A&E
1999	Frank Lloyd Wright		Tricia Reidy	PBS

=== 2000s ===
Year	Program	Episode	Nominees	Network
2000
2000	New York: A Documentary Film	"Cosmopolis 1919-1931"	Li-Shin Yu and Nina Schulman	PBS
2000	Raising the Mammoth		Emmanuel Mairesse	Discovery
2000	The Real World: Hawaii	"Glass Houses"	Mark Raudonis	MTV
2000	Walking with Dinosaurs		Andrew Wilks and Britt Sjoerdsma	Discovery
2001
2001	Living Dolls: The Making of a Child Beauty Queen		Charlton McMillan	HBO
2001	Dwarfs: Not a Fairy Tale		Geof Bartz	HBO
2001	Half Past Autumn: The Life and Works of Gordon Parks		Sam Pollard	HBO
2001	Jazz	"Dedicated to Chaos"	Paul Barnes and Erik Ewers	PBS
2001	Survivor	"Trial by Fire"	Brian Barefoot, Jonathon Braun, Jeannette Christensen, Mitchell Danton, Sean Foley, Claudia Hoover, Ivan Ladizinsky, Bob Mathews, Craig Serling, Chris Simpson and Rod C. Spence	CBS
2002
2002	In Memoriam: New York City, 9/11/01		Geof Bartz and Paula Heredia	HBO
2002	America Undercover	"Small Town Ecstasy"	Mark Baum	HBO
2002	America Undercover	"Southern Comfort"	Kate Davis	HBO
2002	The Blue Planet	"Ocean World"	Martin Elsbury	Discovery
2002	9/11		Richard Barber, Michael J. Maloy, Jason Schmidt, Bruce Spiegel and Mead Stone	CBS
2002	Survivor	"Two Peas in a Pod"	Lane Baker, Brian Barefoot, Jonathon Braun, Brian Catalina, Jeannette Christensen, David H. Cutler, Sean Foley, Jerry U. Frizell, Ivan Ladizinsky, Bob Mathews, Craig Serling, Chris Simpson and Rod C. Spence	CBS
2003
2003	Journeys with George		Aaron Lubarsky	HBO
2003	American Masters	"Daughter from Danang"	Kim Roberts	PBS
2003	American Masters	"Seabiscuit"	Toby Shimin	PBS
2003	Expedition: Bismarck		Chris Angel, Calli Cerami, Andre Gelhaar, Matt Kregor and Fiona Wight	Discovery
2003	Survivor	"More Than Meats the Eye"	Lane Baker, Brian Barefoot, Jonathon Braun, David H. Cutler, Sean Foley, Jerry U. Frizell, David Handman, Ivan Ladizinsky, Bob Mathews, Chris Simpson, James M. Smith and Rod C. Spence	CBS
2004
2004	American Masters	"Judy Garland: By Myself"	Kate Hirson, Kristen Huntley and Deborah Peretz	PBS
2004	The Amazing Race	"I Could Never Have Been Prepared for What I'm Looking at Right Now"	Sharmila Ariathurai, Andrew Frank, Paul Frazier, Julian Gomez, Eric Johannsen, Thomas McGah, Joubin Mortazavi, Paul C. Nielsen, Jason Pedroza, Craig Serling, Hudson H. Smith III and Eric Van Wagenen	CBS
2004	The Apprentice	"DNA, Heads and the Undead Kitty"	Jonathon Braun, David H. Cutler, Glen Ebesu, Andrew Ecker, Stephen R. Frederick, Scott Gamzon, David Michael Maurer, Jamie Nelsen, Dave Oliver, Jason Pedroza, Jim Ruxin, Claire Scanlon, Chris Simpson, Jason Steinberg and Janet Swanson	NBC
2004	Survivor	"Shark Attack"	H.A. Arnarson, Tim Atzinger, Lane Baker, Brian Barefoot, Paul J. Coyne, Mitchell Danton, Sean Foley, Jerry U. Frizell, Michael Greer, David Handman, Bryan Horne, Ricky Kreitman, Ivan Ladizinsky, Bob Mathews, Evan Mediuch, Joubin Mortazavi, Geoffrey Rowland and James M. Smith	CBS
2004	Survivor	"Swimming with Sharks"	Lane Baker, Brian Barefoot, Sean Foley, Jerry U. Frizell, Mike Greer, David Handman, Bryan Horne, Ivan Ladizinsky, Bob Mathews, Evan Mediuch, Joubin Mortazavi, James M. Smith and Eric Van Wagenen	CBS
2005
2005	The Amazing Race	"We're Moving Up the Food Chain"	"Mighty" Friedman, Eric Goldfarb, Julian Gomez, Andrew Kozar, Paul C. Nielsen, Jacob Parsons, Jeff Runyan and Eric Wilson	CBS
2005	The Apprentice	"Lights! Camera! Transaction!"	Lane Baker, Peregrine Beckman, Jonathan Braun, Buzz Chatman, David H. Cutler, Glen Ebesu, Andrew Ecker, Steve Escobar, Stephen R. Frederick, Scott Gamzon, Pamela Malouf, David Michael Maurer, Dave Oliver, Jason Pedroza, Dean Permé, Jim Ruxin, Edward Salier, Claire Scanlon, Plowden Schumacher, Chris Simpson, Michael T. Smith, Jason Steinberg, Janet Swanson and Eric Van Wagenen	NBC
2005	The Contender	"The Hangman's Noose"	H.A. Arnarson, Chad Bertalotto, Andrew Bolhuis, Conroy Browne, Willie Castro, Nicholas Don Vito, Sean Foley, Andrew Frank, Julius Ramsay, Rich Remis, J.D. Sievertson, Hudson H. Smith III, Steven Uhlenberg and Eric Van Wagenen	NBC
2005	Survivor	"Culture Shock and Violent Storms"	Tim Atzinger, Tracy Bacenas, Brian Barefoot, Mitchell Danton, Eric Gardner, Michael Greer, David Handman, Frederick Hawthorne, Bryan Horne, Ricky Kreitman, Ivan Ladizinsky, Robert D. Mathews, Evan Mediuch, Joubin Mortazavi and James M. Smith	CBS
2005	Survivor	"This Has Never Happened Before"	Tim Atzinger, Tracy Bacenas, Brian Barefoot, Mitchell Danton, Richard B. Fox, Jerry U. Frizell, Eric Gardner, Michael Greer, David Handman, Frederick Hawthorne, Ricky Kreitman, Ivan Ladizinsky, Robert D. Mathews, Evan Mediuch, Joubin Mortazavi and James M. Smith	CBS
2006
2006	Rome: Engineering an Empire		Jennifer P. Honn	History
2006	AFI's 100 Years...100 Movie Quotes		Barry A. O'Brien, Debra Light and Tim Preston	CBS
2006	American Masters	"John Ford/John Wayne: The Filmmaker and the Legend"	Steven Wechsler	PBS
2006	American Masters	"No Direction Home: Bob Dylan"	David Tedeschi	PBS
2006	Baghdad ER		Carrie Goldman and Patrick McMahon	HBO
2006	Penn & Teller: Bullshit!	"Prostitution"	Steven Uhlenberg	Showtime
2007
2007	When the Levees Broke: A Requiem in Four Acts		Sam Pollard, Geeta Gandbhir and Nancy Novack	HBO
2007	AFI's 100 Years...100 Cheers: America's Most Inspiring Movies		Barry A. O'Brien, Debra Light and Tim Preston	CBS
2007	Deadliest Catch	"The Unforgiving Sea"	Kelly Coskran and Ed Greene	Discovery
2007	Ghosts of Abu Ghraib		Sari Gilman	HBO
2007	Meerkat Manor	"Family Affair"	Renoir Tuahene	Animal Planet
2007	Planet Earth	"Mountains"	Andy Netley	Discovery
2008
2008	Autism: The Musical		Kim Roberts	HBO
2008	AFI's 100 Years...100 Movies (10th Anniversary Edition)		Barry A. O'Brien, Debra Light and Marlise Malkames	CBS
2008	Deadliest Catch	"No Mercy"	Kelly Coskran and Rob Butler	Discovery
2008	This American Life	"Escape"	Joe Beshenkovsky	Showtime
2008	The War	"FUBAR"	Paul Barnes	PBS
2008	The War	"Pride of Our Nation"	Tricia Reidy	PBS
2009
2009	This American Life	"John Smith"	Joe Beshenkovsky	Showtime
2009	Anthony Bourdain: No Reservations	"Laos"	Jesse Fisher	Travel
2009	Deadliest Catch	"Stay Focused or Die"	Kelly Coskran and Josh Earl	Discovery
2009	102 Minutes That Changed America		Seth Skundrick	History
2009	Roman Polanski: Wanted and Desired		Joe Bini	HBO

=== 2010s ===
Year	Program	Episode	Nominees	Network
2010	By the People: The Election of Barack Obama		Sam Pollard, Geeta Gandbhir and Arielle Amsalem	HBO
2010	America: The Story of Us	"Division"	Matt Lowe	History
2010	Deadliest Catch	"No Second Chances"	Kelly Coskran and Josh Earl	Discovery
2010	Life	"Challenges of Life"	Martin Ellsbury and Sharon Gillooly	Discovery
2010	Whale Wars	"The Stuff of Nightmares"	Eric Myerson, Andy Schrader and Joseph McCasland	Animal Planet
2011	Freedom Riders		Lewis Erskine and Aljernon Tunsil	PBS
2011	American Masters	"LENNONYC"	Ed Barteski and Deborah Peretz	PBS
2011	Anthony Bourdain: No Reservations	"Haiti"	Eric Lasby	Travel
2011	Becoming Chaz		Cameron Teisher	OWN
2011	If God Is Willing and da Creek Don't Rise		Sam Pollard and Geeta Gandbhir	HBO
2012	Frozen Planet	"Ends of the Earth"	Andy Netley, Sharon Gillooly	Discovery
2012	American Masters	"Johnny Carson: King of Late Night"	Mark Catalena	PBS
2012	Anthony Bourdain: Parts Unknown	"U.S. Desert"	Nick Brigden	CNN
2012	Beyond Scared Straight	"Oakland County, MI"	Rob Goubeaux, Heather Abell, Mark S. Andrew and Paul J. Coyne	A&E
2012	George Harrison: Living in the Material World		David Tedeschi	HBO
2013	Mea Maxima Culpa: Silence in the House of God		Sloane Klevin	HBO
2013	American Masters	"Mel Brooks: Make a Noise"	Asako Ushio and Robert Trachtenberg	PBS
2013	Crossfire Hurricane		Conor O'Neill and Stuart Levy	HBO
2013	Ethel		Azin Samari	HBO
2013	Richard Pryor: Omit the Logic		Chris A. Peterson	Showtime
2014	The Square		Pedro Kos, Christopher de la Torre and Mohamed El Manasterly	Netflix
2014	American Masters	"Jimi Hendrix: Hear My Train A Comin'"	Gordon Mason, Stephen Ellis and Phil McDonald	PBS
2014	Anthony Bourdain: Parts Unknown	"Tokyo"	Nick Brigden	CNN
2014	Cosmos: A Spacetime Odyssey	"Standing Up in the Milky Way"	John Duffy, Michael O'Halloran and Eric Lea	Fox
2014	The Sixties	"The Assassination of President Kennedy"	Chris A. Peterson	CNN
2015	The Jinx: The Life and Deaths of Robert Durst	"Chapter 1: A Body in the Bay"	Richard Hankin, Zac Stuart-Pontier, Caitlyn Greene and Shelby Siegel	HBO
2015	The Case Against 8		Kate Amend	HBO
2015	Citizenfour		Mathilde Bonnefoy	HBO
2015	Going Clear: Scientology and the Prison of Belief		Andy Grieve	HBO
2015	Kurt Cobain: Montage of Heck		Joe Beshenkovsky and Brett Morgen	HBO
2016	Making a Murderer	"Indefensible"	Moira Demos	Netflix
2016	Cartel Land		Matthew Hamachek, Matthew Heineman, Pax Wassermann and Bradley J. Ross	A&E
2016	He Named Me Malala		Greg Finton, Brian Johnson and Brad Fuller	Nat Geo
2016	Vice	"Fighting ISIS"	Rebecca Adorno and Roman Safiullin	HBO
2016	What Happened, Miss Simone?		Joshua L. Pearson	Netflix
2017
2017	O.J.: Made in America		Bret Granato, Maya Mumma and Ben Sozanski	ESPN
2017	The Beatles: Eight Days a Week — The Touring Years		Paul Crowder	Hulu
2017	Planet Earth II	"Cities"	Dave Pearce	BBC America
2017	Planet Earth II	"Islands"	Matt Meech	BBC America
2017	13th		Spencer Averick	Netflix
2017	Vice	"Assad's Syria / Cost of Climate Change"	Joe Langford, Richard Lowe and Denny Thomas	HBO
2018
2018	Anthony Bourdain: Parts Unknown	"Lagos"	Hunter Gross	CNN
2018	The Defiant Ones	"Episode 3"	Lasse Järvi and Doug Pray	HBO
2018	Jane		Joe Beshenkovsky, Brett Morgen and Will Znidaric	Nat Geo
2018	Wild Wild Country	"Part 3"	Neil Meiklejohn	Netflix
2018	The Zen Diaries of Garry Shandling		Joe Beshenkovsky	HBO
2019
2019	Free Solo		Bob Eisenhardt	Nat Geo
2019	Anthony Bourdain: Parts Unknown	"Lower East Side"	Tom Patterson	CNN
2019	Leaving Neverland		Jules Cornell	HBO
2019	RBG		Carla Gutierrez	CNN
2019	Three Identical Strangers		Michael Harte	CNN

=== 2020s ===
Year	Program	Episode	Nominees	Network
2020
2020	Apollo 11		Todd Douglas Miller	CNN
2020	American Factory		Lindsay Utz	Netflix
2020	Beastie Boys Story		Jeff Buchanan and Zoe Schack	Apple TV+
2020	The Last Dance	"Episode 1"	Chad Beck, Devin Concannon, Abhay Sofsky and Ben Sozanski	ESPN
2020	McMillion$	"Episode 3"	Jody McVeigh-Schultz, Lane Farnham, James Lee Hernandez, Brian Lazarte and Scott Hanson	HBO
2020	Tiger King: Murder, Mayhem and Madness	"Cult of Personality"	Doug Abel, Nicholas Biagetti, Dylan Hansen-Fliedner, Geoffrey Richman and Daniel Koehler	Netflix
2021
2021	The Social Dilemma		Davis Coombe	Netflix
2021	Allen v. Farrow	"Episode 1"	Parker Laramie, Sara Newens and Mikaela Shwer	HBO
2021	The Bee Gees: How Can You Mend a Broken Heart		Derek Boonstra and Robert A. Martinez	HBO
2021	Billie Eilish: The World's a Little Blurry		Greg Finton, Lindsey Utz and Azin Samari	Apple TV+
2021	David Attenborough: A Life on Our Planet		Martin Elsbury and Charles Dyer	Netflix
2021	Framing Britney Spears (The New York Times Presents)		Geoff O'Brien and Pierre Takal	FX
2021	Q: Into the Storm	"The Storm"	Tom Patterson, Cullen Hoback, David Tillman, Evan Wise and Ted Woerner	HBO
2022
2022	The Beatles: Get Back	"Part 3: Days 17-22"	Jabez Olssen	Disney+
2022	George Carlin's American Dream		Joseph Beshenkovsky	HBO Max
2022	Lucy and Desi		Robert A. Martinez, Dan Reed and Inaya Graciana Yusuf	Prime Video
2022	Stanley Tucci: Searching for Italy	"Venice"	Hamit Shonpal	CNN
2022	The Tinder Swindler		Julian Hart	Netflix
2022	We Need to Talk About Cosby	"Part 1"	Meg Ramsay and Jennifer Brooks	Showtime
2023
2023	Still: A Michael J. Fox Movie		Michael Harte	Apple TV+
2023	100 Foot Wave	"Chapter III - Jaws"	Alex Bayer, Alex Keipper and Quin O'Brien	HBO
2023	Moonage Daydream		Brett Morgen	HBO
2023	Pretty Baby: Brooke Shields		David Teague, Sara Newens and Anne Yao	Hulu
2023	The 1619 Project	"Justice"	Ephraim Kirkwood, Jesse Allain-Marcus and Adriana Pacheco	Hulu
2023	Stanley Tucci: Searching for Italy	"Calabria"	Liz Roe	CNN
2024
2024	Jim Henson Idea Man		Sierra Neal and Paul Crowder	Disney+
2024	Albert Brooks: Defending My Life		Bob Joyce	Max
2024	Beckham	"Golden Balls"	Michael Harte, Paul Carlin and Chris King	Netflix
2024	Escaping Twin Flames	"Up in Flames"	Martin Biehn, Kevin Hibbard, Troy Takaki, Mimi Wilcox and Inbal B. Lessner	Netflix
2024	The Jinx — Part Two	"Chapter 9: Saving My Tears Until It's Official"	Richard Hankin, Charles Olivier, Lance Edmands, Sam Neave, Camilla Hayman and David Tillman	HBO
2024	Quiet on Set: The Dark Side of Kids TV	"Hidden in Plain Sight"	Daphne Gómez-Mena, Jane Jo and Cody Rogowski	ID
2024	Steve! (Martin) A Documentary in 2 Pieces	"Then"	Alan Lowe	Apple TV+
2025
2025	Pee-wee as Himself		Damian Rodriguez	HBO
2025	Chimp Crazy	"Gone Ape"	Evan Wise, Charles Divak, Adrienne Gits, Doug Abel and Sascha Stanton-Craven	HBO
2025	Ladies & Gentlemen... 50 Years of SNL Music		James Lester, Oz Rodríguez and F. Michael Young	NBC
2025	SNL50: Beyond Saturday Night	"More Cowbell"	Cori Wapnowska	Peacock
2025	Super/Man: The Christopher Reeve Story		Otto Burnham	HBO
2025	Will & Harper		Monique Zavistovski and Lori Lovoy-Goran	Netflix
2026
2026	Sean Combs: The Reckoning	"Blink Again"	Charles Divak, Evan Wise, Jack Gravina, Benji Kast, Adam Goldstein, Jonathan Miller and Jeremy Siefer	Netflix
2026	John Candy: I Like Me		Shane Reid, Darrin Roberts and Dominick Rolandelli	Prime Video
2026	Marty, Life Is Short		Sierra Neal and Bennett Piscitelli	Netflix
2026	Mel Brooks: The 99 Year Old Man!		Joe Beshenkovsky	HBO Max
2026	Mr. Scorsese	"Stranger in a Strange Land"	David Bartner and George O'Donnell	Apple TV

== Programs with multiple nominations ==
10 nominations

- American Masters

4 nominations

- Anthony Bourdain: Parts Unknown

2 nominations

- America Undercover
- Anthony Bourdain: No Reservations
- The Jinx
- Planet Earth II
- Stanley Tucci: Searching for Italy
- This American Life
- Vice
- The War
