= Ally Pankiw =

Canadian screenwriter and director

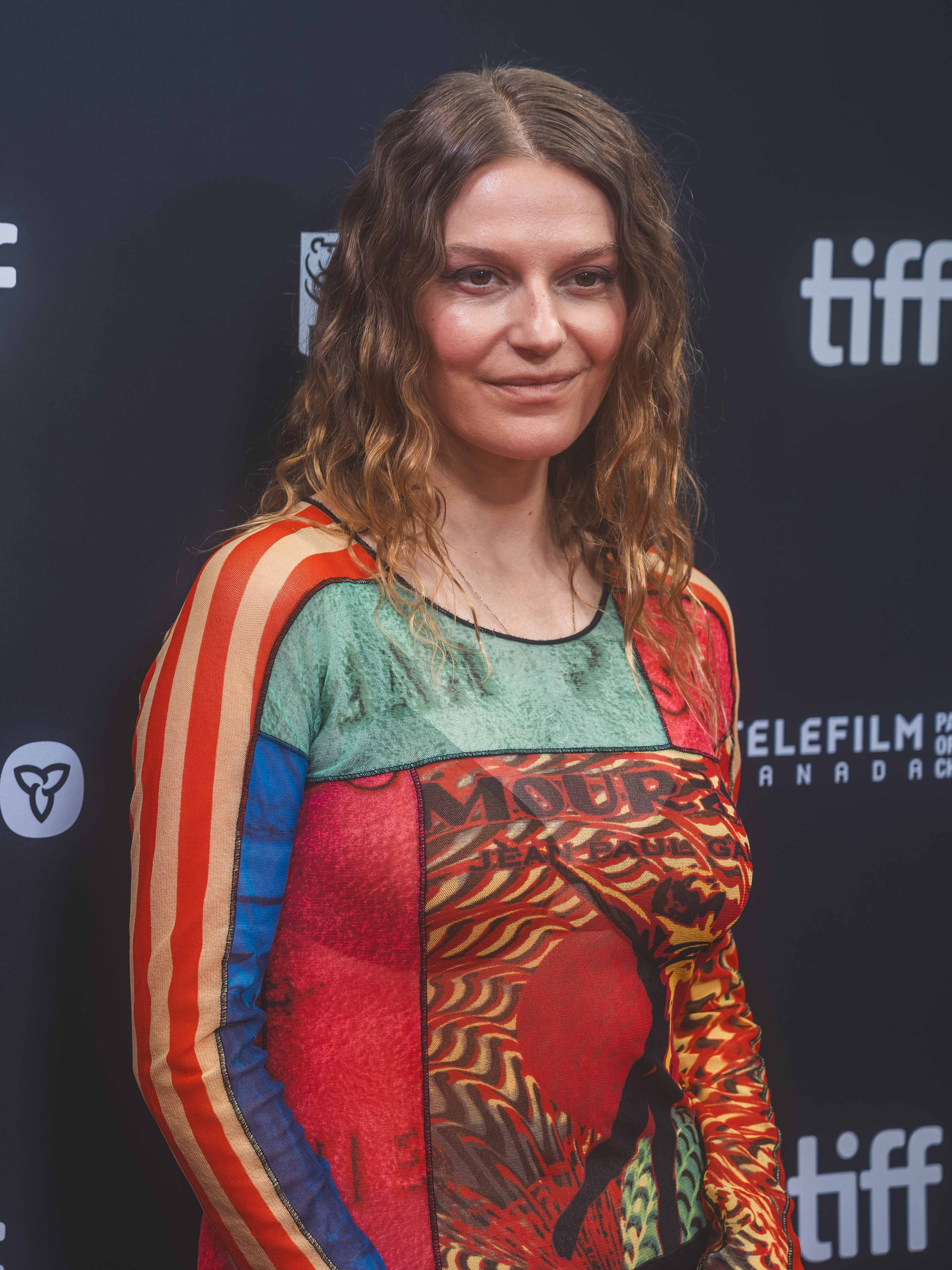
- Born: November 14, 1986 (age 39)
- Occupations: Director; Screenwriter

Ally Pankiw (/ˈpæŋkjuː/) (born Sally Pankiw; November 14, 1986) is a Canadian film and television writer and director from St. Albert, Alberta, whose debut feature film I Used to Be Funny premiered in 2023.

== Career ==
Pankiw began her career with The Young Astronauts and through their agency Partizan Midi-Minuit, she directed music videos for artists such as Kira Isabella, Ralph, Muna, Janelle Monáe and Arkells, She also directed content for brands such as Pepsi, Amazon, Adidas, Nylon, WestJet, and Chanel, as well as making short films. Beginning in 2017, she directed the comedy web series Terrific Women for CBC Gem, as well as becoming a story editor on the television sitcom Schitt's Creek.

She subsequently directed the entire first season of Mae Martin's semi-autobiographical comedy series Feel Good, as well as episodes of Shrill and The Great.

In 2022, she was announced as co-creator with Dan Levy of Standing By, an animated comedy series about a group of disgruntled guardian angels, for Hulu.

I Used to Be Funny premiered at the 2023 South by Southwest festival, and had its Canadian premiere at the 2023 Inside Out Film and Video Festival. The film follows a stand-up comedian who is struggling with PTSD and must face her trauma in order to help in the search for a missing teenage girl she used to nanny. She started the script in 2013 and found it to be an exploration of themes in her own life. When the #MeToo movement came to light, it was then an exploration of many other stories as well.

She also directed "Joan Is Awful", a 2023 episode of the anthology series Black Mirror which starred Annie Murphy and Salma Hayek. The episode follows a woman who is stunned to discover a global streaming platform has launched a prestige TV drama adaptation of her life.

Lilith Fair: Building a Mystery, following the concert tour of the same name, premiered on the Canadian Broadcasting Corporation and Hulu in September 2025. The film received a Canadian Screen Award nomination for Best Feature Length Documentary at the 14th Canadian Screen Awards in 2026.

== Awards ==
She received a Canadian Comedy Award nomination for Best Direction in a Web Series at the 18th Canadian Comedy Awards in 2018, for Terrific Women.

At Inside Out, I Used to Be Funny won the Audience Award for best narrative feature film.

I Used to Be Funny had also been nominated for the SXSW Grand Jury Award for Narrative Feature at the SXSW Film Festival in 2023, as well as the Audience Award at Americana Film Fest, the Music + Sound Award for Best Sync in a Film at Music + Sound Awards, International, and the VFCC Award at the Vancouver Film Critics Circle in 2024.

== Personal life ==
In childhood, Pankiw was a dancer and choreographer. This played a part in inspiring her to become a director and writer. Other moments that inspired her include watching movies with Christoper Guest, how it felt to write her first short film, editing her first documentary in university, and when she first saw Sofia Coppola on set.

Today, she lives in Toronto and L.A., but works in several other locations as well.

Pankiw came out as queer in 2008. She was in a relationship with Naomi McPherson of the band Muna.

Pankiw is of Ukrainian-Jewish origin.
