= The Beatles: Eight Days a Week =

The Beatles: Eight Days a Week – The Touring Years
- Theatrical release poster
- Directed by: Ron Howard
- Written by: Mark Monroe
- Produced by: Brian Grazer; Ron Howard; Scott Pascucci; Nigel Sinclair
- Starring: John Lennon; Paul McCartney; George Harrison; Ringo Starr
- Edited by: Paul Crowder
- Music by: The Beatles
- Production companies: Apple Corps; Imagine Entertainment; White Horse Pictures
- Distributed by: StudioCanal (UK); PolyGram Entertainment (UK); Abramorama (U.S.); Hulu (U.S.)
- Release dates: 15 September 2016 (UK, U.S.)
- Running time: 97 minutes
- Countries: United Kingdom; United States
- Language: English
- Budget: $5 million
- Box office: $12.3 million

The Beatles: Eight Days a Week – The Touring Years is a 2016 documentary film directed by Ron Howard about the Beatles' career during their touring years from 1962 to 1966, from their performances at the Cavern Club in Liverpool to their final concert in San Francisco in 1966.

The film was released theatrically on 15 September 2016 in the United Kingdom and the United States, and started streaming on Hulu on 17 September 2016. It received several awards and nominations, including for Best Documentary at the 70th British Academy Film Awards and the Outstanding Documentary or Nonfiction Special at the 69th Primetime Creative Arts Emmy Awards.

== Production ==
The film was produced with the cooperation of surviving Beatles Paul McCartney and Ringo Starr, and Beatle widows Yoko Ono and Olivia Harrison. In addition to directing the documentary, Ron Howard also served as a producer alongside Brian Grazer, Nigel Sinclair, and Scott Pascucci. Written by Mark Monroe, the film was edited by Paul Crowder. Marc Ambrose served as supervising producer.

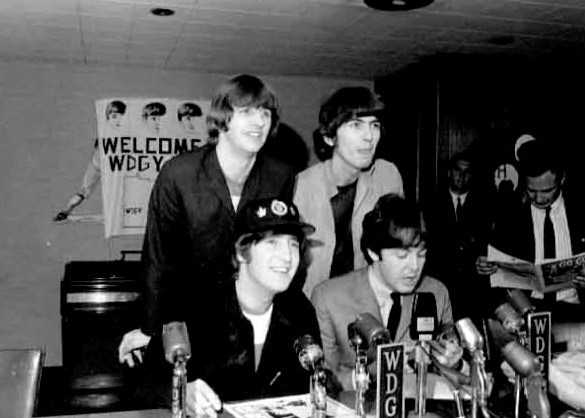
The Beatles in August 1965 at their press conference at Metropolitan Stadium in Bloomington, Minnesota

Prior to the film's release, it was announced that it includes 30 minutes of film footage shot for the band's 1965 concert at Shea Stadium. That concert was filmed by Ed Sullivan Productions and broadcast on TV in 1966 as The Beatles at Shea Stadium. Consisting of 11 songs, the set was originally shot on 35mm film and was digitally restored in 4K resolution for the documentary, in addition to having remastered sound by Giles Martin, son of Beatles producer George Martin. The Shea Stadium concert was only included in theaters, and remains unavailable on home video release.

== Release ==
The film project was announced by Hulu on 4 May 2016 as its first documentary acquisition, as part of a planned Hulu Documentary Films collection. The film premiered theatrically on 15 September, before debuting on the streaming service on 17 September.

=== Box office ===
The Beatles: Eight Days a Week—The Touring Years grossed $2.9 million in the U.S. and Canada and $9.4 million in other territories, including $1.4 million in the UK, for a worldwide total of $12.3 million.

In the film's opening weekend in North America, it made $785,336 from 85 theatres, for an average of $9,239.

=== Critical response ===
On review aggregator website Rotten Tomatoes, the film has an approval rating of 96% based on 103 reviews, with an average rating of 7.9/10. The site's critical consensus reads, "We love them, yeah, yeah, yeah—and with archival footage like that, you know The Beatles: Eight Days a Week—The Touring Years can't be bad." On Metacritic, the film has a score of 72 out of 100, based on 22 critics, indicating "generally favorable reviews".

=== Accolades ===
Year	Award	Category	Nominee	Result	Ref.
2016	1st Critics' Choice Documentary Awards	Best Director	Ron Howard	Nominated	
2016	1st Critics' Choice Documentary Awards	Best Music Documentary	The Beatles: Eight Days a Week	Won	
2017	59th Grammy Awards	Best Music Film	The Beatles: Eight Days a Week	Won	
2017	70th British Academy Film Awards	Best Documentary	The Beatles: Eight Days a Week	Nominated	
2017	21st Satellite Awards	Best Documentary Film	The Beatles: Eight Days a Week	Nominated	
2017	Australian Film Critics Association	Best Documentary Film (Local or International)	The Beatles: Eight Days a Week	Nominated	
2017	69th Primetime Creative Arts Emmy Awards	Outstanding Documentary or Nonfiction Special	The Beatles: Eight Days a Week	Nominated	
2017	69th Primetime Creative Arts Emmy Awards	Outstanding Writing for Nonfiction Programming	Mark Monroe	Nominated	
2017	69th Primetime Creative Arts Emmy Awards	Outstanding Picture Editing for a Nonfiction Program	Paul Crowder	Nominated	
2017	69th Primetime Creative Arts Emmy Awards	Outstanding Sound Editing for Nonfiction Programming (Single or Multi-Camera)	Jon Michaels, Harrison Meyle, Dan Kenyon, Will Digby, Melissa Muik	Won	
2017	69th Primetime Creative Arts Emmy Awards	Outstanding Sound Mixing for a Nonfiction Program (Single or Multi-Camera)	Chris Jenkins, Cameron Frankley, Nathan Evans, Sam O'Kell	Won	

== Album ==
An expanded, remixed and remastered version of the 1977 album The Beatles at the Hollywood Bowl was released on 9 September 2016, to coincide with the release of the film.

== Lawsuit ==
On 12 September 2016, Apple Corps. and Subafilms Ltd. were sued by representatives of Sid Bernstein, the concert promoter of the 1965 Shea Stadium concert, over the ownership of the master recordings from the event. While the copyright of the songs was not contested, the footage itself was claimed to be owned by Sid Bernstein Presents, LLC, the company representing Bernstein's interests, who himself died in 2013. The suit requested an injunction against the release of the footage in the film, asserting Bernstein's ownership "[by] reason of being the producer of and having made creative contributions to the 1965 Shea Stadium performance, as well as being the employer for hire of the Beatles and the opening acts, who performed at his insistence and expense". The company had previously submitted applications to the Copyright Office to register ownership of the footage, which were rejected.

Paul Licalsi, a lawyer for Apple Corps., described the lawsuit as "frivolous", citing an agreement that Bernstein had with the band's management over the film rights, as well as the fact that Bernstein himself had never made any claim during his lifetime.
