= Primetime Emmy Award for Outstanding Writing for a Nonfiction Programming =

Television award category

Primetime Emmy Award for Outstanding Writing for a Nonfiction Program
- Awarded for: Outstanding Writing for a Nonfiction Program
- Country: United States
- Presented by: Academy of Television Arts & Sciences
- Currently held by: The Daily Show Presents: Jordan Klepper Fingers the Pulse: Give the Man a Prize (2026)
- Website: emmys.com

The Primetime Emmy Award for Outstanding Writing for a Nonfiction Program is awarded to one television documentary or nonfiction series each year.

In the following list, the first titles listed in gold are the winners; those not in gold are nominees, which are listed in alphabetical order. The years given are those in which the ceremonies took place:

== Winners and nominations ==
=== 1970s ===
Year	Program	Episode	Nominees	Network
1979	Outstanding Individual Achievement - Informational Programming (Note: As a juried award, nominees had to garner 50% approval to win the award. The nominee did not meet the benchmark and no award was given.)			
1979	Scared Straight!		Arnold Shapiro	Syndicated

=== 1980s ===
Year	Program	Episode	Nominees	Network
1980	Outstanding Individual Achievement - Informational Programming (Note: As a juried award, nominees had to garner 50% approval to win the award. The nominee did not meet the benchmark and no award was given.)			
1980	The Body Human: The Body Beautiful		Robert E. Fuisz and Louis H. Gorfain	CBS
1983	Outstanding Individual Achievement - Informational Programming (Note: As a juried award, nominees had to garner 50% approval to win the award.)			
1983	The Body Human: The Living Code		Robert E. Fuisz and Louis H. Gorfain	CBS
1983	I, Leonardo: A Journey of the Mind		Chandler Cowles	CBS
1984	Outstanding Individual Achievement - Informational Programming (Note: As a juried award, nominees had to garner 50% approval to win the award.)			
1984	A Walk Through the 20th Century with Bill Moyers	"Marshall, Texas"	Bill Moyers	PBS
1985	Outstanding Individual Achievement - Informational Programming - Writing (Note: As a juried award, nominees had to garner 50% approval to win the award.)			
1985	Heritage: Civilization and the Jews	"The Crucible of Europe"	Howard Enders, John G. Fox, Michael Joseloff and Marc Siegel	PBS
1985	Heritage: Civilization and the Jews	"Out of the Ashes"	Brian Winston	PBS
1985	Heritage: Civilization and the Jews	"Roads from the Ghetto"	John G. Fox and Eugene Marner	PBS
1985	The Living Planet: A Portrait of the Earth		David Attenborough	PBS
1987	Outstanding Individual Achievement - Informational Programming - Writing (Note: As a juried award, nominees had to garner 50% approval to win the award.)			
1987	The Story of English	"A Muse of Fire"	Robert MacNeil and Robert McCrum	PBS
1987	American Masters	"Billie Holiday: The Long Night of Lady Day"	John Jeremy	PBS
1988	Outstanding Individual Achievement - Informational Programming (Note: As a juried award, nominees had to garner 50% approval to win the award.)			
1988	American Masters	"Buster Keaton: A Hard Act to Follow"	Kevin Brownlow and David Gill	PBS
1988	Dear America: Letters Home from Vietnam		Bill Couturié and Richard Dewhurst	HBO
1988	American Masters	"The Ten-Year Lunch: The Wit and Legend of the Algonquin Round Table"	Peter Foges and Mary Jo Kaplan	PBS
1989	Outstanding Writing in Informational Programming (Note: As a juried award, nominees had to garner 50% approval to win the award.)			
1989	The Mind	"Search for the Mind"	John Heminway	PBS

=== 1990s ===
Year	Program	Episode	Nominees	Network
1990	Outstanding Writing in Informational Programming (Note: As a juried award, nominees had to garner 50% approval to win the award. The nominee did not meet the benchmark and no award was given.)			
1990	American Masters	"Broadway Dreamers: The Legacy of the Group Theater"	Steve Lawson	PBS
1991	Outstanding Individual Achievement - Informational Programming (Note: As a juried award, nominees had to garner 50% approval to win the award.)			PBS
1991	American Masters	"Preston Sturges: The Rise and Fall of an American Dreamer"	Todd McCarthy	PBS
1991	The Civil War	"The Better Angels of Our Nature"	Ric Burns, Ken Burns and Geoffrey C. Ward	PBS
1992	Outstanding Individual Achievement - Informational Programming (Note: As a juried award, nominees had to garner 50% approval to win the award. No nominee met the benchmark and no award was given.)			
1992	Hearts of Darkness: A Filmmaker's Apocalypse		Fax Bahr and George Hickenlooper	Showtime
1992	Losing It All: The Reality of Alzheimer's Disease		Michael Mierendorf	HBO
1993	Outstanding Individual Achievement - Informational Programming (Note: As a juried award, nominees had to garner 50% approval to win the award. The nominee did not meet the benchmark and no award was given.)			
1993	Mine Eyes Have Seen the Glory	"America's Folk Religion"	Randall Balmer	PBS
1994	Outstanding Individual Achievement - Informational Programming (Note: As a juried award, nominees had to garner 50% approval to win the award.) (Note: In 2020, the TV Academy rescinded a win in this category for the Disney Channel special George Stevens: D-Day to Berlin, written by George Stevens Jr. The program was a re-edit of the 1985 BBC documentary D-Day to Berlin, in violation of a rule that "a program that is a foreign acquisition without benefit of a domestic co-production cannot be re-introduced into eligibility in a current awards year, even though it may have been modified with new footage, sound track, musical score, etc.")			
1994	The Legend of Billy the Kid		Todd Robinson	Disney
1994	Reflections on Elephants		Dereck Joubert	PBS
1994	The Untold West	"The Black West"	Dennis Watlington	TBS

=== 2000s ===
Year	Program	Episode(s)	Nominees	Network
2003	American Experience	"Seabiscuit"	Michelle Ferrari	PBS
2003	American Experience	"The Murder of Emmett Till"	Marcia A. Smith	PBS
2003	Da Ali G Show		Sacha Baron Cohen, Dan Mazer, Anthony Hines, Jamie Glassman and James Bobin	HBO
2003	Journeys with George		Alexandra Pelosi	HBO
2003	Unchained Memories: Readings from the Slave Narratives		Mark Jonathan Harris	HBO
2004	American Masters	"Judy Garland: By Myself"	Susan Lacy and Stephen Stept	PBS
2004	Fred Rogers: America's Favorite Neighbor		Rick Sebak	PBS
2004	JFK: A Presidency Revealed		David C. Taylor	History
2004	Pandemic: Facing AIDS	"Uganda/Thailand"	Mark Bailey	HBO
2004	Penn & Teller: Bullshit!	"War on Drugs"	Penn Jillette, Teller, Emma Webster, Star Price and Michael Goudeau	Showtime
2004	Terry Jones' Medieval Lives	"The Peasant"	Terry Jones	History
2005	Unforgivable Blackness: The Rise and Fall of Jack Johnson		Geoffrey C. Ward	PBS
2005	Beyond the Da Vinci Code		Thomas Quinn and Rob Blumenstein	History
2005	Broadway: The American Musical	"Oh, What a Beautiful Mornin'"	JoAnn Young	PBS
2005	Death in Gaza		Saira Shah	HBO
2005	Penn & Teller: Bullshit!	"Profanity"	Penn Jillette, Teller, Jon Hotchkiss, Star Price and Michael Goudeau	Showtime
2006	Stardust: The Bette Davis Story		Peter Jones	TCM
2006	American Masters	"John Ford/John Wayne: The Filmmaker and the Legend"	Kenneth Bowser	PBS
2006	American Masters	"Ernest Hemingway: Rivers to the Sea"	DeWitt Sage	PBS
2006	How William Shatner Changed the World		Alan Handel and Julian Jones	History
2006	Penn & Teller: Bullshit!	"Prostitution"	Penn Jillette, Teller, Cliff Schoenberg, Jon Hotchkiss, Michael Goudeau and Star Price	Showtime
2007	American Masters	"Andy Warhol: A Documentary Film"	James Sanders and Ric Burns	PBS
2007	Penn & Teller: Bullshit!	"Wal-Mart"	Penn Jillette, Teller, Sheryl Zohn, Jon Hotchkiss, Michael Goudeau, Star Price, Cliff Schoenberg and David Weiss	Showtime
2007	Planet Earth	"Mountains"	Vanessa Berlowitz and Gary Parker	Discovery
2007	Star Wars: The Legacy Revealed		Steven Smith, David Comtois and Kevin Burns	History
2007	This American Life	"God's Close-Up"	Nancy Updike	Showtime
2008	The War	"Pride of Our Nation (June–August 1944)"	Geoffrey C. Ward	PBS
2008	American Experience	"Walt Whitman"	Mark Zwonitzer	PBS
2008	Intervention	"Caylee"	Jeff Grogan	A&E
2008	Life After People		David de Vries	History
2008	This American Life	"Escape"	Ira Glass	Showtime
2009	Roman Polanski: Wanted and Desired		Joe Bini, P. G. Morgan and Marina Zenovich	HBO
2009	American Experience	"The Trials of J. Robert Oppenheimer"	David Grubin	PBS
2009	American Masters	"Jerome Robbins: Something to Dance About"	Amanda Vaill	PBS
2009	Make 'Em Laugh: The Funny Business of America	"When I'm Bad, I'm Better — The Groundbreakers"	Michael Kantor and Laurence Maslon	PBS
2009	Penn & Teller: Bullshit!	"New Age Medicine"	Penn Jillette, Teller, Star Price, Rich Nathanson, Michael Goudeau, David Wechter, Cliff Schoenberg and Sheryl Zohn	Showtime

=== 2010s ===
Year	Program	Episode(s)	Nominees	Network
2010	The National Parks: America's Best Idea	"The Last Refuge (1890–1915)"	Dayton Duncan	PBS
2010	America: The Story of Us	"Division"	Jenny Ash and Ed Fields	History
2010	Anthony Bourdain: No Reservations	"Prague"	Anthony Bourdain	Travel
2010	The Buddha		David Grubin	PBS
2010	Life	"Challenges of Life"	Paul Spillenger	Discovery
2011	American Experience	"Freedom Riders"	Stanley Nelson Jr.	PBS
2011	Anthony Bourdain: No Reservations	"Haiti"	Anthony Bourdain	Travel
2011	Gasland		Josh Fox	HBO
2011	Gettysburg		Richard Bedser and Ed Fields	History
2011	Moguls & Movie Stars	"The Birth of Hollywood"	Jon Wilkman	TCM
2012	Prohibition	"A Nation of Hypocrites"	Geoffrey C. Ward	PBS
2012	American Experience	"Clinton"	Barak Goodman	PBS
2012	American Masters	"Johnny Carson: King of Late Night"	Peter Jones	PBS
2012	Anthony Bourdain: No Reservations	"Cuba"	Anthony Bourdain	Travel
2012	Sesame Street: Growing Hope Against Hunger		Christine Ferraro	PBS
2013	Mea Maxima Culpa: Silence in the House of God		Alex Gibney	HBO
2013	Anthony Bourdain: Parts Unknown	"Libya"	Anthony Bourdain	CNN
2013	The Dust Bowl	"The Great Plow-Up"	Dayton Duncan	PBS
2013	Ethel		Mark Bailey	HBO
2013	The Men Who Built America	"A New War Begins"	Stephen David, Patrick Reams, David C. White, Keith Palmer, Randy Counsman and Ed Fields	History
2014	Cosmos: A Spacetime Odyssey	"Standing Up in the Milky Way"	Ann Druyan and Steven Soter	Fox
2014	American Experience	"JFK"	Mark Zwonitzer	PBS
2014	Anthony Bourdain: Parts Unknown	"Congo"	Anthony Bourdain	CNN
2014	The World Wars	"Trial by Fire"	Stephen David, David C. White, John Ealer, Alec Michod, Chelsea Coates, Randy Counsman, Russ McCarroll, Jordan Rosenblum and David Schaye	History
2014	Years of Living Dangerously	"The Surge"	Adam Bolt	Showtime
2015	Going Clear: Scientology and the Prison of Belief		Alex Gibney	HBO
2015	American Experience	"Last Days in Vietnam"	Keven McAlester and Mark Bailey	PBS
2015	Anthony Bourdain: Parts Unknown	"Iran"	Anthony Bourdain	CNN
2015	Kurt Cobain: Montage of Heck		Brett Morgen	HBO
2015	The Roosevelts: An Intimate History	"The Rising Road (1933–1939)"	Geoffrey C. Ward	PBS
2016	Making a Murderer	"Eighteen Years Lost"	Laura Ricciardi and Moira Demos	Netflix
2016	American Experience	"Walt Disney"	Mark Zwonitzer, Sarah Colt and Tom Jennings	PBS
2016	Anthony Bourdain: Parts Unknown	"Borneo"	Anthony Bourdain	CNN
2016	Everything Is Copy — Nora Ephron: Scripted & Unscripted		Jacob Bernstein	HBO
2016	Jackie Robinson		David McMahon and Sarah Burns	PBS
2017
2017	13th		Ava DuVernay and Spencer Averick	Netflix
2017	Amanda Knox		Matthew Hamachek and Brian McGinn	Netflix
2017	Anthony Bourdain: Parts Unknown	"Houston"	Anthony Bourdain	CNN
2017	The Beatles: Eight Days a Week — The Touring Years		Mark Monroe	Hulu
2017	Bill Nye Saves the World	"The Sexual Spectrum"	Prashanth Venkataramanujam, CeCe Pleasants, Sanden Totten, Mike Drucker and Flora Lichtman	Netflix
2018				Netflix
2018	Anthony Bourdain: Parts Unknown	"Southern Italy"	Anthony Bourdain	CNN
2018	The Defiant Ones	"Episode 1"	Allen Hughes, Lasse Järvi and Doug Pray	HBO
2018	Icarus		Bryan Fogel, Mark Monroe and Jon Bertain	Netflix
2018	Jane		Brett Morgen	Nat Geo
2018	Mister Rogers: It's You I Like		JoAnn Young	PBS
2018	The Vietnam War	"Episode 8: The History of the World (April 1969-May 1970)"	Geoffrey C. Ward	PBS
2019
2019	Anthony Bourdain: Parts Unknown	"Kenya"	Anthony Bourdain	CNN
2019	The Case Against Adnan Syed	"Forbidden Love"	Amy J. Berg	HBO
2019	Fyre Fraud		Jenner Furst and Julia Willoughby	Hulu
2019	Hostile Planet	"Grasslands"	Bruce Kennedy	Nat Geo
2019	Our Planet	"Jungles"	Huw Cordey, Keith Scholey, Alastair Fothergill and David Attenborough	Netflix
2019	Wu-Tang Clan: Of Mics and Men	"Episode 1"	Paul Greenhouse, Sacha Jenkins and Peter J. Scalettar	Showtime

=== 2020s ===
Year	Program	Episode(s)	Nominees	Network
2020
2020	Don't F**k with Cats: Hunting an Internet Killer	"Closing the Net"	Mark Lewis	Netflix
2020	Beastie Boys Story		Mike Diamond, Adam Horovitz and Spike Jonze	Apple TV+
2020	The Cave		Alisar Hasan and Feras Fayyad	Nat Geo
2020	Circus of Books		Rachel Mason and Kathryn Robson	Netflix
2020	McMillion$	"Episode 1"	James Lee Hernandez and Brian Lazarte	HBO
2021
2021	The Social Dilemma		Vickie Curtis, Davis Coombe and Jeff Orlowski	Netflix
2021	All In: The Fight for Democracy		Jack Youngelson	Prime Video
2021	Allen v. Farrow	"Episode 3"	Kirby Dick, Amy Ziering, Mikaela Shwer and Parker Laramie	HBO
2021	The Bee Gees: How Can You Mend a Broken Heart		Mark Monroe	HBO
2021	Tulsa Burning: The 1921 Race Massacre		Maia Harris and Marco Williams	History
2022
2022	Lucy and Desi		Mark Monroe	Prime Video
2022	The Andy Warhol Diaries	"Shadows: Andy & Jed"	Andrew Rossi	Netflix
2022	How To with John Wilson	"How To Appreciate Wine"	John Wilson, Michael Koman, Susan Orlean and Conner O'Malley	HBO
2022	The Problem with Jon Stewart	"The Economy"	Chelsea Devantez, Jon Stewart and Kristen Acimovic	Apple TV+
2022	The Tinder Swindler		Felicity Morris	Netflix
2023
2023	The U.S. and the Holocaust	"Episode 2: Yearning to Breathe Free (1938-1942)"	Geoffrey C. Ward	PBS
2023	Dear Mama	"Panther Power"	Allen Hughes and Lasse Järvi	FX
2023	Moonage Daydream		Brett Morgen	HBO
2023	100 Foot Wave	"Chapter V: Lost at Sea"	Zach Rothfeld	HBO
2023	Selena Gomez: My Mind & Me		Alek Keshishian and Paul Marchand	Apple TV+
2024
2024	Conan O'Brien Must Go	"Ireland"	Jessie Gaskell, Conan O'Brien, Matt O'Brien and Mike Sweeney	Max
2024	How To with John Wilson	"How To Watch the Game"	John Wilson, Michael Koman and Allie Viti	HBO
2024	Jim Henson Idea Man		Mark Monroe	Disney+
2024	The Jinx — Part Two	"Chapter 7: Why Are You Still Here?"	Andrew Jarecki, Sam Neave and Zac Stuart-Pontier	HBO
2024	The Reluctant Traveler with Eugene Levy	"Scotland: My Mother's Country"	Alan Connor, David Reilly and Christine Rose	Apple TV+
2025
2025	The Daily Show Presents: Jordan Klepper Fingers the Pulse: MAGA: The Next Generation		Ian Berger, Jordan Klepper, Jen Flanz, Devin Delliquanti and Scott Sherman	Comedy Central
2025	Chimp Crazy	"Head Shot"	Eric Goode, Jeremy McBride, Timothy Moran, Evan Wise, Adrienne Gits, Charles Divak and Doug Abel	HBO
2025	Conan O'Brien Must Go	"Austria"	Conan O'Brien, Mike Sweeney, Jessie Gaskell and José Arroyo	HBO Max
2025	Martha		R. J. Cutler	Netflix
2025	Super/Man: The Christopher Reeve Story		Peter Ettedgui, Ian Bonhôte and Otto Burnham	HBO
2026
2026	The Daily Show Presents: Jordan Klepper Fingers the Pulse: Give the Man a Prize		Jen Flanz, Ian Berger, Zhubin Parang, Devin Delliquanti, Scott Sherman and Jordan Klepper	Comedy Central
2026	The American Revolution	"Episode One: In Order to Be Free (May 1754 – May 1775)"	Geoffrey C. Ward	PBS
2026	The Reluctant Traveler with Eugene Levy	"Living the Royal Life in the UK"	David Reilly and Christine Rose	Apple TV

== Programs with multiple awards ==
4 wins

- American Masters

2 wins

- American Experience
- Anthony Bourdain: Parts Unknown
- The Daily Show Presents: Jordan Klepper Fingers the Pulse

== Individuals with multiple awards ==
5 awards

- Geoffrey C. Ward

2 awards

- Alex Gibney
- Anthony Bourdain
- Jordan Klepper

== Programs with multiple nominations ==
9 nominations

- American Masters

8 nominations

- American Experience

7 nominations

- Anthony Bourdain: Parts Unknown

4 nominations

- Penn & Teller: Bullshit!

3 nominations

- Heritage: Civilization and the Jews

2 nominations

- Conan O'Brien Must Go
- The Daily Show Presents: Jordan Klepper Fingers the Pulse
- How To with John Wilson
- The Reluctant Traveler with Eugene Levy
