= Paris Barclay =

American television director and producer

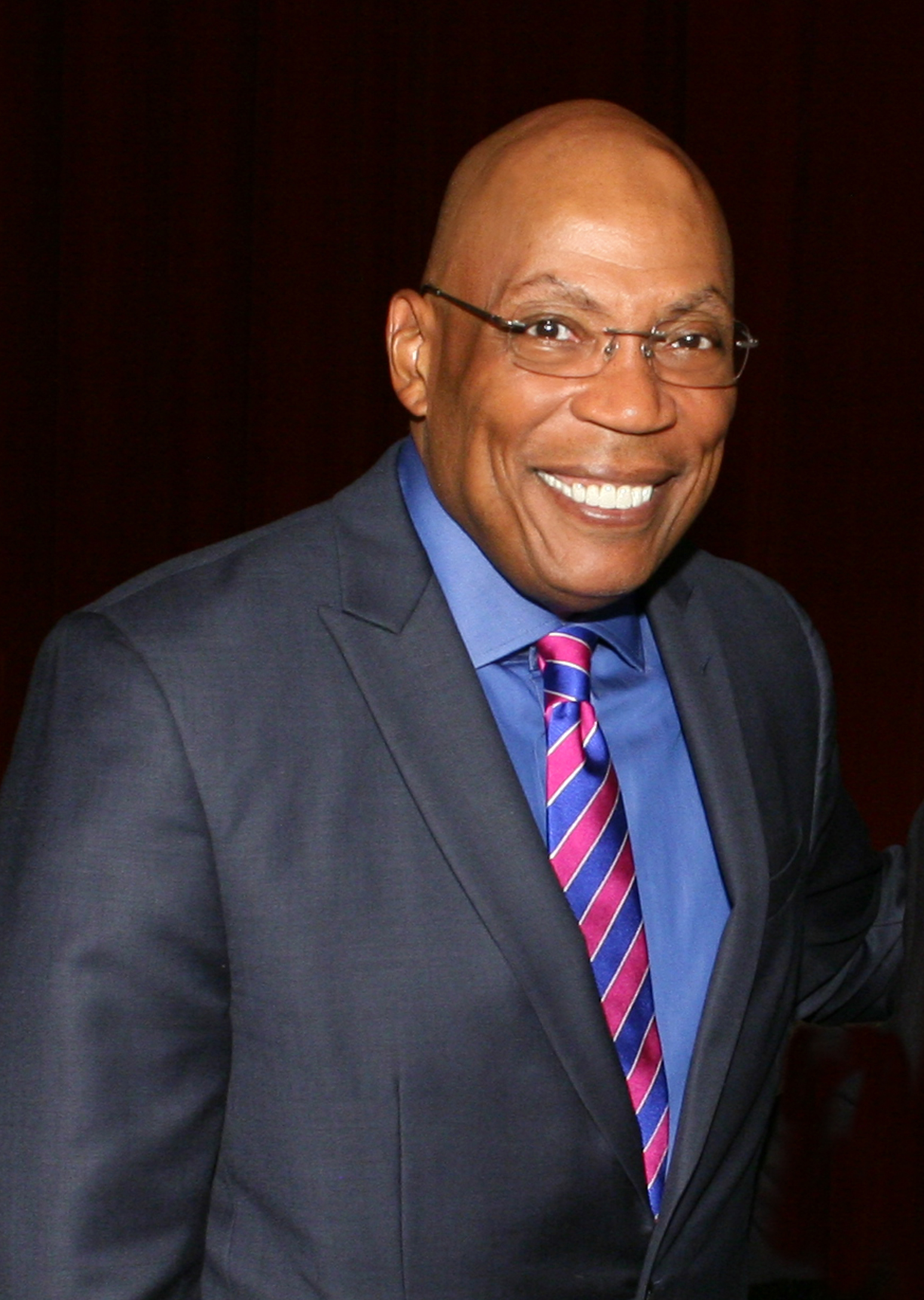
- Barclay in 2013
- Born: Paris K. C. Barclay; June 30, 1956 (age 70); Chicago Heights, Illinois, United States
- Education: Harvard University
- Occupation: Television director
- Years active: 1989–present
- Spouse: Christopher Mason (m. 2008)
- Children: 2
- Website: parisbarclay.com

Paris K. C. Barclay (born June 30, 1956) is an American television director, producer, and writer. He is a two-time Emmy Award winner and has directed nearly 200 episodes of television to date, for series such as NYPD Blue, ER, The West Wing, CSI, Lost, The Shield, House, Sons of Anarchy, In Treatment, Glee, Dahmer – Monster: The Jeffrey Dahmer Story, The Watcher, and American Horror Story: NYC. He serves as an executive producer on many of the shows he directs. From 2013 to 2017, Barclay served two terms as the President of the Directors Guild of America.

Recent work of note includes the critically acclaimed documentary film Billy Preston: That's the Way God Planned It, about the life and career of musician Billy Preston.

With his ninth Emmy nomination for an episode of Dahmer – Monster: The Jeffrey Dahmer Story in 2023, Barclay became the first Black director to be nominated by the Television Academy in every narrative dramatic category.

== Early life and education ==
Barclay was born in Chicago Heights, Illinois. Raised Catholic, he attended La Lumiere School, a private college preparatory boarding school in La Porte, Indiana. On scholarship, he was one of the first African-Americans to attend the school.

Barclay went on to study English at Harvard University, where he was active in student musical theatre productions and the a cappella singing group The Harvard Krokodiloes. During his four years there, he wrote 16 musicals, including the music for two of the annual Hasty Pudding shows. Barclay attended both the La Lumiere School and Harvard with John Roberts, now the Chief Justice of the Supreme Court. His Harvard roommate was novelist Arthur Golden, author of Memoirs of a Geisha.

== Music video career ==
Following his graduation from Harvard, Barclay worked as a copywriter and creative supervisor at Grey, BBDO, Cunningham & Walsh, and Marsteller. Hoping to create more opportunities for minorities, Barclay, along with Joel Hinman of the music video company Scorched Earth Productions, co-founded a production company called Black & White Television. There, he went on to direct music videos for artists such as Bob Dylan ("It's Unbelievable"), the New Kids On The Block ("Games"), as well as Janet Jackson and Luther Vandross ("The Best Things in Life Are Free"). Most notably, he created eight videos for LL Cool J, including "Mama Said Knock You Out", which won awards from both MTV and Billboard—and went on to be listed by The Rock and Roll Hall of Fame as one of the 500 songs that shaped rock and roll. In 2013, Complex Magazine ranked "Mama Said Knock You Out" as one of the top 50 rap videos of the 1990s, crediting it with creating "one of the most crucial links in establishing the cultural bridge between boxing and rap." Barclay was often hired to direct music videos to promote films, introducing audiences to House Party (1990), White Men Can't Jump (1992), Mo' Money (1992), Posse (1993), and Cool Runnings (1993), among others.

In 2012, Barclay directed his first music video in 16 years, working once again with LL Cool J and R&B star Joe on the video for "Take It". Also drawing on his music video experience was Barclay's episode ("The Coup") of the Steven Spielberg-produced NBC series Smash, in which TV Fanatic said that the Barclay-directed number for the original song "Touch Me" (written by OneRepublic's Ryan Tedder) "pushed the boundaries from traditional Broadway show to music video level."

== Film and television career ==
=== 1990s ===
Barclay began his career in television with an unaired episode of Angel Street in 1992. He was hired by John Wells, who was making his debut as an executive producer.

Barclay directed Shawn and Marlon Wayans' first feature film, Don't Be a Menace to South Central While Drinking Your Juice in the Hood (1996) – also featuring Keenen Ivory Wayans, Vivica Fox, and Bernie Mac. It was a surprise box office hit that has since achieved cult status. Barclay also directed the HBO movie, The Cherokee Kid (1996), a Western dramedy starring Sinbad, James Coburn, Burt Reynolds.

After directing episodes of ER, Barclay directed and eventually became a producer of NYPD Blue. In three years there, Barclay would receive two Emmy Awards for best directing—the second of which was for the episode titled "Hearts and Souls"— featuring the death of Jimmy Smits' character Bobby Simone. The episode has been ranked one of TV Guide's 100 Best Episodes of All Time. Barclay reteamed with Smits again in his role as "Nero Padilla" on Sons of Anarchy.

=== 2000s ===
In 2000, Barclay joined forces with fellow NYPD Blue producers Steven Bochco and Nicholas Wootton to create City of Angels, a medical drama with a predominantly African-American cast including Blair Underwood, Viola Davis, Octavia Spencer, Maya Rudolph, and Vivica Fox. The show aired on CBS for two seasons while winning two NAACP awards.

In 2002 he returned to the John Wells fold to produce and direct a pilot, The Big Time, featuring Christina Hendricks, Dylan Baker, Molly Ringwald and Christopher Lloyd—which eventually aired as a two-hour movie. In the years that followed, Barclay worked on a wide variety of television dramas and comedies. He served as co-executive producer and producing director of the series Cold Case, for which he has also directed nine episodes. Other shows he directed in the decade include The West Wing, Huff, Law & Order, Numb3rs, Lost, House, The Shield, Weeds, Monk,The Good Wife, NCIS: Los Angeles, Sons of Anarchy, CSI, The Mentalist and 9 episodes of Glee.

2008 marked Barclay's return to HBO, where he executive produced three seasons of In Treatment, as well as directed 36 episodes. The series garnered a Golden Globes nomination for Best Drama Series in 2009 and series lead Gabriel Byrne won the Golden Globe for Best Television Actor in a Drama Series that same year. In 2008, the series won 2 Emmys for Glynn Turman for Outstanding Guest Actor in a Drama Series and Dianne Wiest won for Outstanding Supporting Actress in a Drama Series.

Also in 2008, Barclay collaborated with screenwriter Dustin Lance Black to write the MTV film Pedro, the story of Pedro Zamora from The Real World: San Francisco. The film, directed by Nick Oceano, premiered at the Toronto International Film Festival and earned the Writers Guild, the Humanitas Prize, and GLAAD Media Awards nominations.

=== 2010s ===
In 2011, Barclay became the executive producer and primary director for the fourth season of FX's Sons of Anarchy, a role he continued through the seventh and final season.

In 2013, Barclay directed Glee episodes "Diva" and "Lights Out", earning an Emmy nomination for Outstanding Directing in a Comedy Series for "Diva".

In 2014, Barclay again directed Sons of Anarchy's season premiere and penultimate episodes, along with Glee's milestone "100", which brought his third Emmy nomination for Glee. During this period, he also directed episodes of The Good Wife, Steven Spielberg's Extant starring Halle Berry, the Tommy Schlamme/Sam Shaw period drama Manhattan, and Glee's emotional flashback episode "2009", the first half of the series finale.

In 2015, Barclay served as executive producer/director on FX's The Bastard Executioner, created by Kurt Sutter and starring Stephen Moyer and Katey Sagal. At the end of the year, he directed an episode of FOX's hit series Empire, the Television Critics Association's program of the year.

In 2016, Barclay joined the Shondaland family by directing an episode of ABC's critically acclaimed show, Scandal, created/produced by Shonda Rhimes, starring Kerry Washington. In the fall, he went on to executive produce and direct the pilot for FOX's Pitch, created by Dan Fogelman and Rick Singer. The series starred Kylie Bunbury, Mark-Paul Gosselaar and Mark Consuelos, and Barclay directed four episodes in total.

In 2017, Barclay executive produced and directed the pilot for another Shondaland drama, Station 19, a Grey's Anatomy spinoff centered on Seattle firefighters. The show ran for seven seasons on ABC and aired over 100 episodes.

In early 2019, Barclay reunited with his Pedro co-writer Dustin Lance Black to produce and direct the Americans for the Equality Act public awareness campaign for the Human Rights Campaign. The series, which launched on March 25, 2019, with a debut video featuring Academy Award-winning actress Sally Field and her son Sam Greisman, highlighted prominent figures in entertainment, sports and beyond speaking about the need for the Equality Act — a crucial civil rights bill that would extend clear, comprehensive non-discrimination protections to millions of LGBTQ people nationwide. The powerhouse lineup of supporters included Jamie Lee Curtis, Jane Lynch, Jesse Tyler Ferguson and Justin Mikita, Adam Rippon, Shea Diamond, Marcia Gay Harden, Alexandra Billings, Blossom Brown, Justina Machado, Gloria Calderon Kellett, Charlie and Max Carver, and Karamo Brown. The series was modeled after HRC's successful Americans for Marriage Equality campaign and was awarded at the 4th Annual Shorty Social Good awards. It ultimately helped lead to the act's passage in the House of Representatives.

=== 2020s ===
In May 2021, Barclay directed a virtual reading of Larry Kramer's The Normal Heart, with Sterling K. Brown, Laverne Cox, Jeremy Pope and Guillermo Diaz.

Also in 2021, after executive producing and directing 14 episodes of Station 19, Barclay directed two episodes of the Ryan Murphy Netflix series Dahmer – Monster: The Jeffrey Dahmer Story. The series surpassed 1 billion hours viewed on Netflix, one of the few shows in Netflix history to cross the 1 billion hour viewing mark within 60 days. Despite controversies surrounding Dahmer, Barclay's work on Episode 6, "Silenced," received wide praise. For this episode, Barclay received a 2023 Emmy nomination for Best Directing for a Limited or Anthology Series or TV Movie. Barclay's work on the series finale, "God of Forgiveness, God of Vengeance," was also nominated by the Hollywood Critics Association.

After Dahmer, Paris reteamed with Ryan Murphy, executive producing and directing two episodes of The Watcher, starring Naomi Watts and Bobby Cannavale, which debuted as Netflix's #1 most-watched series. He followed this by directing two episodes each of Murphy's American Sports Story: Aaron Hernandez and Monsters: The Lyle and Erik Menendez Story, the latter starring Javier Bardem and Chloë Sevigny. He then directed the pilot and executive produced ABC's Doctor Odyssey, starring Joshua Jackson and Don Johnson. The series drew 13.6 million cross-platform viewers in its first week, marking ABC's best drama premiere in four years. Paris directed 6 of its 18 episodes.

In 2025, Paris directed two episodes of Season 3 of Shawn Ryan's Netflix hit The Night Agent, followed by an episode of Brilliant Minds with Zachary Quinto. In 2026, he helmed episodes of Dan Fogelman's The Land and two episodes of the final season of Paradise, starring Sterling K. Brown. Paris is currently in production on Netflix's new series The Roman, starring Oscar Isaac and Alec Baldwin, from Billions creators Brian Koppleman and David Levien.

== Billy Preston documentary ==
In 2024, Barclay directed the documentary Billy Preston: That's the Way God Planned It, about American keyboardist and singer Billy Preston. The film explores Preston's life and musical legacy, including his early career as a child prodigy and his collaborations with artists such as The Beatles and The Rolling Stones.

The film features interviews with Ringo Starr, Eric Clapton, Billy Porter, and Olivia Harrison, among others, and began appearing at festivals in 2023 and 2024, premiering at the SXSW Film Festival and later screening at DOC NYC, where it began drawing early critical attention. Variety praised the film as "Amazing… eye-opening… I came out feeling like I finally knew him." Rolling Stone called it an "unabashed, unapologetic joy" and "a portrait of a gifted musician who deserves to be remembered".

Following its festival run, the film was released into select theaters beginning February 20, 2026, debuting at Film Forum in New York City. It later expanded to additional theaters in more than 30 cities across the United States and had its Los Angeles premiere at the Laemmle Royal Theatre.

Additional reviews also commented on the film following its release. The New York Times described the documentary as "mind-blowing" and "moving and vivid", noting that "the music that buoys this chronicle is a constant source of joy". Texas Monthly called the film "a poignant examination of the relationship between music, self-hood, joy and spirituality".

== Work in musical theater ==
In the theater, Barclay presented his original musical On Hold With Music at Manhattan Theater Club in 1984, with a cast including Jason Alexander, Terry Burrell, John Dossett, Ray Gill, and Maureen Brennan. Based on his life in advertising, Barclay wrote and composed the musical in its entirety.

In 1985, he wrote the book, music and lyrics for another musical drama entitled Almos' a Man, based on a short story by Richard Wright – which had been developed in the second year of the ASCAP Musical Theater Workshop in New York, under the tutelage of Charles Strouse and Stephen Sondheim. It was produced that year at Soho Rep, receiving a mixed review from The New York Times' Mel Gussow.

After years of directing, Barclay returned to composing in September 2001 with the premiere of a musical based on the collection of letters Dear America: Letters Home from Vietnam. Called Letters from 'Nam, the play featured Grammy winner Maureen McGovern, future Tony winner Levi Kreis, and David Burnham. Praised by reviewers and opening days before the September 11 attacks in 2001, the Vietnam musical reportedly hit home emotionally with many who performed in it, produced it, or experienced it.

In 2003, Barclay wrote songs for and co-directed Order My Steps for the Cornerstone Theater Company. The musical play, with book by Tracey Scott Wilson, dealt with the African-American church's response to the AIDS epidemic. The Los Angeles Times called it a "moving tale about the human toll of AIDS."

Barclay returned to Vietnam with One Red Flower: Letters from 'Nam, a reworked version of the musical was produced at the Village Theater in Issaquah to further acclaim, with Levi Kreis and David Burnham reprising their roles. Other productions followed, with the most significant being Eric Schaeffer's "gritty and emotional" staging at the Signature Theatre in Arlington, Virginia in 2004.

In 2008, Barclay presented a reading of One Red Flower in Los Angeles to benefit New Directions, an organization that supports veterans of all wars. Maureen McGovern, Levi Kreis and David Burnham returned in featured roles, with television stars Hunter Parrish and Josh Henderson. Although it was not a full production, again it received glowing reviews, described by Beverly Cohn in the Santa Monica Mirror as an "evening that had the audience smiling with a lump in its throat." Barclay is currently working with Brian Yorkey (Next to Normal) to develop One Red Flower as a television movie, now entitled Letters From 'Nam.

== Directors Guild of America ==
In June 2013, Barclay was elected President of the Directors Guild of America, the first African-American and first openly gay President in the history of the Guild. After the vote, Barclay expressed gratitude for the honor and admiration for the Union's history. Barclay was nominated for the Presidency by past-President Michael Apted. His nomination was seconded by Steven Soderbergh. Barclay was re-elected in June 2015.

Before being elected DGA President, Barclay served four terms as First Vice President of the DGA, where he was the first African-American Officer in the history of the guild. While serving as First Vice President, Barclay was also chair of the DGA's Political Action Committee. He also served on the Western Directors Council and co-chaired the Diversity Task Force. In addition, Barclay served as a board member of the DGA-affiliated Franco-American Cultural Fund, which promotes cultural exchange between French and American directors.

Barclay completed his second term as DGA president in June 2017. He was succeeded by Thomas Schlamme, whom he worked with on The West Wing and Manhattan, as well as on the DGA board.

Barclay's work for the DGA continues even after his presidency: he helped create and teaches the Guild's First Time Director Orientation., and in the 2020 contract negotiations Barclay co-chaired the Television Creative Rights Committee. He also serves as the co-Chair of the DGA's Return to Work Committee, which created the protocols that brought the industry back to work after the COVID shutdown. In 2021, he was elected the Guild's Secretary/Treasurer.

In 2021, he was named an Honorary Life Member of the DGA, one of the guild's highest honors, recognizing his career achievements and leadership in the industry. His acceptance speech earned praise for its focus on his hopes for his two sons. He currently serves as the Guild's Secretary/Treasurer.

== Personal life ==
Openly gay since late in his college days, he was a regular contributor to The Advocate for several years. Barclay married food-industry executive Christopher Barclay (né Mason), his partner of 10 years, in 2008. They have 2 children.

Barclay named West Side Story, Do the Right Thing, Citizen Kane, Schindler's List and It's a Wonderful Life as his favorite movies and influences.

== Filmography ==
Film

- Don't Be a Menace to South Central While Drinking Your Juice in the Hood (1996)

=== Television ===
Year	Title	Director	Executive Producer	Notes
1992	Angel Street	Yes	No	2 episodes
1993	Moon Over Miami	Yes	No	Episode "Black River Bride"
1995	Extreme	Yes	No	Episode "Death Do Us Part"
1995	Silk Stalkings	Yes	No	Episode "Tricks of the Trade"
1995	Diagnosis: Murder	Yes	No	Episode "Witness to Murder"
1996–2000	ER	Yes	No	3 episodes
1996–1997	Sliders	Yes	No	3 episodes
1996	Second Noah	Yes	No	2 episodes
1997	Brooklyn South	Yes	No	Episode: "A Rev. Runs Through It"
1997–1998	Clueless	Yes	No	2 episodes
1997–1999	NYPD Blue	Yes	No	12 episodes; also supervising producer
2000	City of Angels	Yes	Yes	4 episodes, also co-creator
2000–2002	The West Wing	Yes	No	3 episodes
2002	The Chang Family Saves the World	Yes	No	TV pilot
2002–2003	Fastlane	Yes	No	2 episodes
2003	American Dreams	Yes	No	Episode "Change a Comin'"
2003	The Street Lawyer	Yes	No	TV pilot
2003–2008	Cold Case	Yes	Yes	9 episodes
2003–2007	The Shield	Yes	No	3 episodes
2004	Huff	Yes	No	Episode: "Lipstick on Your Panties"
2004	Dead Lawyers	Yes	No	TV pilot
2005	Law & Order	Yes	No	Episode "Ain't No Love"
2005	NUMB3RS	Yes	No	Episode "Dirty Bomb"
2005	House	Yes	No	Episode "Three Stories"
2005	Hate	Yes	No	TV pilot
2007	Dirt	Yes	No	2 episodes
2007	Lost	Yes	No	Episode "Stranger in a Strange Land"
2007–2009	CSI: Crime Scene Investigation	Yes	No	4 episodes
2007–2008	Monk	Yes	No	2 episodes
2008	Weeds	Yes	No	Episode "The Three Coolers"
2008	The Mentalist	Yes	No	Episode "Red Brick and Ivy"
2008–2010	In Treatment	Yes	Yes	36 episodes
2008–2014	Sons of Anarchy	Yes	Yes	15 episodes
2009–2010	NCIS: Los Angeles	Yes	No	2 episodes
2009–2015	Glee	Yes	No	9 episodes
2009–2014	The Good Wife	Yes	No	2 episodes
2010	Miami Medical	Yes	No	Episode "An Arm and a Leg"
2011	The Chicago Code	Yes	No	Episode "Greylord and Gambit"
2011	Big Mike	Yes	No	TV pilot
2012	Smash	Yes	No	Episode "The Coup"
2013	Last Resort	Yes	No	Episode "The Pointy End of the Spear"
2013	The New Normal	Yes	No	Episode "Rocky Bye Baby"
2014	Extant	Yes	No	Episode "Shelter"
2014	Manhattan	Yes	No	Episode "Last Reasoning of Kings"
2015	The Bastard Executioner	Yes	Yes	4 episodes
2016	Scandal	Yes	No	Episode "I See You"
2016	Empire	Yes	No	Episode "The Tameness of a Wolf"
2016	Pitch	Yes	Yes	4 episodes
2017	How to Get Away with Murder	Yes	No	Episode "I'm Not Her"
2017	Perfect Citizen	Yes	No	TV pilot
2018–2024	Station 19	Yes	Yes	18 episodes
2021	Rebel	Yes	No	Episode "36 Hours"
2022–2024	Monster	Yes	No	4 episodes
2022	The Watcher	Yes	Yes	2 episodes
2022	American Horror Story: NYC	Yes	No	2 episodes
2023	With Love	Yes	No	Episode "Christmas Eve"
2024–2025	Doctor Odyssey	Yes	Yes	5 episodes
2024	American Sports Story	Yes	No	2 episodes
2025	Brilliant Minds	Yes	No	Episode "Once Upon a Time in America"
2026	The Night Agent	Yes	No	2 episodes

TV movies

- America's Dream (1996)
- The Cherokee Kid (1996)
- The Big Time (2002)

Documentary

- Billy Preston: That's The Way God Planned It (2026)

=== Music video ===
Year	Title	Artist
1989	"The Rhythm"	Kwamé
1989	"Big Ole Butt"	LL Cool J
1989	"One Shot at Love"	LL Cool J
1990	"Jingling Baby"	LL Cool J
1990	"Around the Way Girl"	LL Cool J
1990	"Funhouse"	Kid 'n Play
1990	"Unbelievable"	Bob Dylan
1991	"Strictly Business"	LL Cool J
1991	"Mama Said Knock You Out"	LL Cool J
1992	"Tragic Comic"	Extreme
2012	"Take It"	LL Cool J Feat. Joe

== Awards and nominations ==
=== Competitive awards ===
Year	Association	Category	Nominated work	Result	Ref.
1998	Primetime Emmy Awards	Outstanding Drama Series	NYPD Blue	Nominated	
1998	Primetime Emmy Awards	Outstanding Directing for a Drama Series	NYPD Blue: "Lost Israel, Part 2"	Won	
1999	Primetime Emmy Awards	Outstanding Drama Series	NYPD Blue	Nominated	
1999	Primetime Emmy Awards	Outstanding Directing for a Drama Series	NYPD Blue: "Hearts and Souls"	Won	
2002	Primetime Emmy Awards	Outstanding Directing for a Drama Series	The West Wing: "The Indians in the Lobby"	Nominated	
2010	Primetime Emmy Awards	Outstanding Directing for a Comedy Series	Glee: "Wheels"	Nominated	
2013	Primetime Emmy Awards	Outstanding Directing for a Comedy Series	Glee: "Diva"	Nominated	
2014	Primetime Emmy Awards	Outstanding Directing for a Comedy Series	Glee: "100"	Nominated	
2023	Primetime Emmy Awards	Outstanding Directing for a Limited Series or Movie	Dahmer – Monster: The Jeffrey Dahmer Story: "Silenced"	Nominated	
1997	Directors Guild of America Award	Outstanding Directing - Drama Series	ER	Nominated	
1999	Directors Guild of America Award	Outstanding Directing - Drama Series	NYPD Blue	Won	
2001	Directors Guild of America Award	Outstanding Directing - Drama Series	The West Wing	Nominated	
2002	Directors Guild of America Award	Outstanding Directing - Drama Series	The West Wing	Nominated	
2003	Directors Guild of America Award	Outstanding Directing - Drama Series	The West Wing	Nominated	
2006	Directors Guild of America Award	Outstanding Directing - Drama Series	House	Nominated	
2009	Directors Guild of America Award	Outstanding Directing - Drama Series	In Treatment	Nominated	
2009	Directors Guild of America Award	Outstanding Directing - Comedy Series	Weeds	Nominated	
2010	Directors Guild of America Award	Outstanding Directing - Drama Series	In Treatment	Nominated	
2010	Directors Guild of America Award	Outstanding Directing - Comedy Series	Glee	Nominated	
1998	Peabody Award	Entertainment	NYPD Blue	Won	
2009	Peabody Award	Entertainment	Glee	Won	
2009	Peabody Award	Entertainment	In Treatment	Won	

=== Honorary awards ===
Year	Association	For	Ref.
1998	Project Angel Food	Founder's Award from in 1998	
2001	GLAAD Association	Stephen F. Kolzak Award	
2003	US Department of Health and Human Services	Voice Award	
2004	Pan-African Film Festival	Pioneer Award	
2007	Directors Guild of America Award	Robert B. Aldrich Service Award	
2009	POWER UP	Top Ten Gay Men in Entertainment	
2010	Shane's Inspiration Gala	Visionary Leadership Award	
2010	Academy of Television Arts & Sciences	Television with a Conscience	
2010	Cornerstone Theater	Bridge Award	
2011	Advertising Age	50 Most Creative People	
2012	Liberty Hill Foundation	Upton Sinclair Award	
2012	In the Life Media	Family Values Award	
2013	African-American Film Critics Association	Legacy Award	
2014	NAACP Image Award	The Hall of Fame Award	
2017	Aviva Family & Children Services Program	Artistic Excellence Award	
2017	Hasty Pudding Institute of Harvard University	Order of the Golden Sphinx	
2018	Human Rights Campaign	Visibility Award	
2021	Directors Guild of America Award	Honorary Life Member	
