= The Apollo (2019 film) =

2019 documentary film

- Directed by: Roger Ross Williams
- Written by: Roger Ross Williams; Cassidy Hartmann; Jean Tsien
- Produced by: Roger Ross Williams; Lisa Cortés; Jeanne Elfant Festa; Cassidy Hartmann
- Cinematography: Michael Dwyer
- Edited by: Jean Tsien; John S. Fisher
- Music by: Robert Glasper
- Production companies: White Horse Pictures; Impact Partners; HBO Documentary Films; The Apollo Theatre Foundation
- Distributed by: HBO
- Release date: April 24, 2019
- Running time: 102 minutes
- Country: United States
- Language: English

The Apollo is a 2019 American documentary film directed by Roger Ross Williams. The Apollo had its world premiere on April 24, 2019, at the Tribeca Film Festival. It received positive reviews and won the Primetime Emmy Award for Outstanding Documentary or Nonfiction Special in 2020 while also being shortlisted for nomination of the Academy Award for Best Documentary Feature Film at the 92nd Academy Awards.

== Summary ==
The film looks at the unique history and contemporary legacy of the iconic Apollo Theater while following the Apollo's inaugural staging of Ta-Nehisi Coates' acclaimed "Between the World and Me."

== Reception ==
The review aggregator website Rotten Tomatoes surveyed 22 critics and assessed 21 as positive and 1 as negative for a 95% rating. Metacritic determined an average rating of 7.7/10.

Leah Greenblatt of Entertainment Weekly scored The Apollo an A−, writing "Oscar-winning director Roger Ross Williams stacks his story accordingly, drawing warm testimonials from some of the biggest names to ever grace its stage, including Aretha Franklin, Smokey Robinson, Gladys Knight, Jamie Foxx, and Pharrell Williams. But the [film] also works beautifully as a mosaic, unfurling its rich history without failing to acknowledge that it takes more than nostalgia to keep a cultural institution alive. In that sense, The Apollo feels like both a necessary lesson and a gift."

== Accolades ==
Year	Award	Category	Nominee(s)	Result	Ref.
2019	IDA Documentary Awards	Best Music Documentary	Roger Ross Williams, Lisa Cortés, Jeanne Elfant Festa, and Cassidy Hartmann	Nominated	
2019	Satellite Awards	Best Motion Picture – Documentary	The Apollo	Nominated	
2020	AARP Movies for Grownups Awards	Best Documentary	The Apollo	Nominated	
2020	Black Reel Awards	Outstanding Documentary	Roger Ross Williams	Nominated	
2020	Black Reel Awards	Outstanding Original Song	"Don't Turn Back" – Robert Glasper and Ledisi	Nominated	
2020	Golden Reel Awards	Outstanding Achievement in Sound Editing – Non-Theatrical Documentary	Christopher Barnett, Al Nelson, and Benny Burtt	Nominated	
2020	Guild of Music Supervisors Awards	Best Music Supervision for a Documentary	G. Marq Roswell and Dondi Bastone	Nominated	
2020	NAACP Image Awards	Outstanding Documentary (Film)	The Apollo	Nominated	
2020	Primetime Emmy Awards	Outstanding Documentary or Nonfiction Special	Roger Ross Williams, Lisa Cortés, Jeanne Elfant Festa, Cassidy Hartmann, Dan Cogan, Nicholas Ferrall, and Julie Goldman	Won	
