= The Kennedy/Marshall Company =

US film-production company

- Logo used since 2006
- Type: Private
- Industry: Film; Television
- Founded: 1991; 35 years ago
- Founders: Kathleen Kennedy; Frank Marshall
- Headquarters: Santa Monica, California, United States
- Products: Motion pictures
- Services: Film production
- Owner: Frank Marshall
- Divisions: K/M Documentaries
- Website: kennedymarshall.com

The Kennedy/Marshall Company (K/M) is an American film and television production company, based in Santa Monica, California, founded in 1991 by spouses Kathleen Kennedy and Frank Marshall.

Logo used from 1994 to 2006, used as a print logo until 2009

It has had contracts with Paramount Pictures, Spyglass Entertainment, DreamWorks Pictures, Universal Pictures, 20th Century Studios, Warner Bros. Pictures and the Walt Disney Studios. Kennedy and Marshall are founders at Steven Spielberg's Amblin Entertainment, though no longer affiliated with the studio.

== History ==
In 1992, Kathleen Kennedy and Frank Marshall left Amblin Entertainment to form their own self-titled banner The Kennedy/Marshall Company with a three-year first look deal at Paramount Pictures. After leaving Amblin, Marshall directed and Kennedy produced Alive which was released in 1993 as a Kennedy/Marshall production; however, the first film under their deal with Paramount was Milk Money (1994).

In 1995, the duo left Paramount Pictures with a three-year production deal at the Walt Disney Studios. In 1998, the company tried their first foray into television, signing a development pact with CBS to air Kennedy/Marshall's television shows for the network. Later that same year, the studio left Disney for Universal Pictures, with an eleven-year deal.

In 2005, Kennedy/Marshall entered its foray onto the Broadway fold to bring the Off Broadway revival Hurlyburly to Broadway.

In 2009, they left Universal Pictures for Sony Pictures Entertainment. Two years later, they left Sony Pictures for DreamWorks Pictures.

In 2012, Kennedy left to join Lucasfilm as president. During the same year, the studio signed a deal with CBS Television Studios to produce television shows made for the company.

== Selected filmography ==
=== Feature films ===
==== 1990s ====
Title	Release date	U.S. distributor	Co-production companies	Box office
Alive	January 15, 1993	Buena Vista Pictures	Touchstone Pictures; Paramount Pictures	$82.5 million
Milk Money	August 31, 1994	Paramount Pictures		$18 million
Congo	June 9, 1995	Paramount Pictures		$152 million
The Indian in the Cupboard	July 14, 1995	Paramount Pictures (theatrical); Columbia Pictures (home video)	Scholastic Productions	$35.7 million
Olympic Glory	January 22, 1999	IMAX	EMC Films; MegaSystems, Inc.	N/A
The Sixth Sense	August 6, 1999	Buena Vista Pictures (Hollywood Pictures)	Spyglass Entertainment; Barry Mendel Productions	$672.8 million
Snow Falling on Cedars	December 22, 1999	Universal Pictures		$23 million

==== 2000s ====
Title	Release date	U.S. distributor	Co-production companies	Box office
A Map of the World	January 21, 2000	First Look Pictures	Overseas Filmgroup; Cinerenta Medienbeteiligungs KG	$544,538
The Bourne Identity	June 14, 2002	Universal Pictures	Hypnotic	$214.4 million
Signs	August 2, 2002	Buena Vista Pictures (Touchstone Pictures)	Blinding Edge Pictures	$408.2 million
Seabiscuit	July 25, 2003	Universal Pictures	DreamWorks Pictures; Spyglass Entertainment; Larger Than Life Productions	$148.3 million
The Young Black Stallion	December 25, 2003	Buena Vista Pictures (Walt Disney Pictures)		$9.6 million
The Bourne Supremacy	July 23, 2004	Universal Pictures	Ludlum Entertainment	$311 million
Mr. 3000	September 17, 2004	Buena Vista Pictures (Touchstone Pictures)	Dimension Films; Spyglass Entertainment	$21.8 million
Munich	December 23, 2005	Universal Pictures	DreamWorks Pictures; Alliance Atlantis; Barry Mendel Productions; Amblin Entertainment; Peninsula Films	$131 million
Roving Mars	January 27, 2006	Buena Vista Pictures (Walt Disney Pictures)	White Mountain Films	$11 million
Eight Below	February 17, 2006	Buena Vista Pictures (Walt Disney Pictures)	Mandeville Films; Spyglass Entertainment	$120.5 million
Hoot	May 5, 2006	New Line Cinema	Walden Media	$8 million
The Bourne Ultimatum	August 3, 2007	Universal Pictures	MP Beta Productions; Ludlum Entertainment	$444 million
Persepolis	December 25, 2007	Sony Pictures Classics	Diaphana Distribution; Celluloid Dreams; CNC; France 3 Cinema; Region Ile-de-France	$22.8 million
The Diving Bell and the Butterfly	February 1, 2008	Miramax Films	Pathe; Canal+ France 3 Cinema	$19.8 million
The Spiderwick Chronicles	February 14, 2008	Paramount Pictures	Nickelodeon Movies; Atmosphere Pictures	$162.8 million
The Curious Case of Benjamin Button	December 25, 2008	Paramount Pictures	Paramount Pictures; Warner Bros. Pictures	$335.8 million
Crossing Over	January 27, 2009	The Weinstein Company		$3.5 million
Ponyo (English dub)	August 14, 2009	Walt Disney Studios Motion Pictures (Walt Disney Pictures)	Studio Ghibli; Nippon Television Network; Dentsu; Hakuhodo DY Media Partners; Buena Vista Home Entertainment; Mitsubishi; Toho	$205.9 million

==== 2010s ====
Title	Release date	U.S. distributor	Co-production companies	Box office
The Last Airbender	July 2, 2010	Paramount Pictures	Nickelodeon Movies; Blinding Edge Pictures	$319.7 million
Hereafter	October 22, 2010	Warner Bros. Pictures	Malpaso Productions; Amblin Entertainment	$107 million
The Adventures of Tintin	December 21, 2011	Paramount Pictures	Paramount Pictures; Columbia Pictures; Amblin Entertainment; WingNut Films; Nickelodeon Movies	$374 million
War Horse	December 25, 2011	Walt Disney Studios Motion Pictures (Touchstone Pictures)	DreamWorks Pictures; Reliance Entertainment; Amblin Entertainment	$177.6 million
The Secret World of Arrietty (U.S. dub)	February 17, 2012	Walt Disney Studios Motion Pictures (Walt Disney Pictures)	Studio Ghibli; Nippon Television Network; Dentsu; Hakuhodo DY Media Partners; Walt Disney Japan; Mitsubishi; Toho; Wild Bunch	$146 million
The Bourne Legacy	August 10, 2012	Universal Pictures	Relativity Media; Captivate Entertainment	$280.4 million
Lincoln	November 16, 2012	Walt Disney Studios Motion Pictures (Touchstone Pictures)	20th Century Fox; DreamWorks Pictures; Participant Media; Reliance Entertainment; Amblin Entertainment	$275.3 million
From Up on Poppy Hill (English dub)	March 15, 2013	GKIDS	Studio Ghibli; Nippon Television Network; Dentsu; Hakuhodo DY Media Partners; Walt Disney Japan; Mitsubishi; Toho	$61.5 million
The Wind Rises (English dub)	February 28, 2014	Walt Disney Studios Motion Pictures (Touchstone Pictures)	Studio Ghibli; Nippon Television Network; Dentsu; Hakuhodo DY Media Partners; Walt Disney Japan; Mitsubishi; Toho; KDDI	$136.8 million
The Tale of the Princess Kaguya (English dub)	October 17, 2014	GKIDS	Studio Ghibli; Nippon Television Network; Dentsu; Hakuhodo DY Media Partners; Walt Disney Japan; Mitsubishi; Toho; KDDI	$27 million
Jurassic World	June 12, 2015	Universal Pictures	Amblin Entertainment; Legendary Pictures	$1.671 billion
The BFG	July 1, 2016	Walt Disney Studios Motion Pictures (Walt Disney Pictures)	Walt Disney Pictures; Amblin Entertainment; Walden Media; Reliance Entertainment; The Roald Dahl Story Company	$195.2 million
Jason Bourne	July 29, 2016	Universal Pictures	Perfect World Pictures; Pearl Street Films; Captivate Entertainment	$416.2 million
Sully	September 9, 2016	Warner Bros. Pictures	Malpaso Productions; Village Roadshow Pictures; RatPac-Dune Entertainment; Flashlight Films; Orange Corp	$240.8 million
Assassin's Creed	December 21, 2016	20th Century Fox	New Regency Productions; Ubisoft Motion Pictures; DMC Film	$240.7 million

==== 2020s ====
Title	Release date	U.S. distributor	Co-production companies	Box office
The Bee Gees: How Can You Mend a Broken Heart	December 12, 2020	HBO	HBO Documentary Films; Polygram Entertainment; White Horse Pictures; Diamond Docs; under K/M Documentaries	$283,826
Jazz Fest: A New Orleans Story	May 13, 2022	Sony Pictures Classics	Sutter Road Picture Company	N/A
Jurassic World Dominion	June 10, 2022	Universal Pictures	Amblin Entertainment; Perfect World Pictures	$1.004 billion
Rather	May 1, 2024	Netflix	Anchor Entertainment; Original Productions; Wavelength Productions; under K/M Documentaries	N/A
The Beach Boys	May 24, 2024	Disney+	Walt Disney Pictures; White Horse Pictures; Iconic Artists Group; Diamond Docs; under K/M Documentaries	N/A
Twisters	July 19, 2024	Universal Pictures	Warner Bros. Pictures; Amblin Entertainment	$372.3 million
Jurassic World Rebirth	July 2, 2025	Universal Pictures	Amblin Entertainment	$872.4 million

==== Upcoming ====
Title	Release date	Distributor	Co-production companies
The Adventures of Tintin: Prisoners of the Sun	TBA	Paramount Pictures	Nickelodeon Movies; Amblin Entertainment; WingNut Films

=== Television shows ===
Title	Years	Network	Notes
Laurel Canyon	2020	Epix	co-production with Jigsaw Productions, Amblin Television, Warner Music Entertainment and MGM Television
McCartney 3,2,1	2021	Hulu	co-production with Endeavor Content, MPL Communications, Shangri-La, Film 45 and Diamond Docs
San Francisco Sounds: A Place in Time	2023	MGM+	under K/M Documentaries; co-production with Jigsaw Productions, Amblin Television, FourScore Productions, Sony Music Entertainment, Warner Music Entertainment and MGM+ Studios
