= Jump for the Cause =

Jump for the Cause is a non-profit group of women who perform mass skydiving formations to raise money. A new world's record was set on Saturday, September 26, 2009; when 181 women from 31 countries jumped in formation. This event also raised more than $900,000 for a cancer-care center based in California.

== History ==
Jump For The Cause was established in 1997 as a U.S. Internal Revenue Code Section 501(c)(3) corporation. It was founded by Mallory Lewis, Brad Hood, Kate Cooper-Jensen, and Tony Domenico. In the past, the organization has raised over $400,000 to sponsor the Stereotactic Biopsy Exam Room at the City of Hope’s breast cancer research and treatment center. It has also raised more than $500,000 to sponsor an entire floor at the hospital’s research building.

== World record ==
Jump for the Cause has made three prior FAI recognized Women's World Records in skydiving since their formation in 1999. This jump; having been the largest yet, consisted of 181 women from 26 countries who jumped from nine planes at 17,000 feet. The women were finally able to break the world record on the sixth attempt. The prior records were a 118 way set in 1999, a 132 way in 2002 and a 151 skydiver formation set in 2005. There were no reported injuries from anyone involved. All JFTC events have been held at the Perris Valley Skydiving Center in Perris, California. The most recent JFTC was run from 21–27 September 2009 during a festival celebrating the beginning of October’s Breast Cancer Awareness Month.

The group was co-organized by Mallory Lewis, the daughter of Shari Lewis, the puppeteer of Lamb Chop and author of many children's books. She stated that she was hoping to raise $700,000 for City of Hope, a cancer-care center in California, United States. "I couldn't believe when we passed $900,000." Lewis stated. Primary organizer of the skydiving section of the event was Kate Cooper-Jensen aided by Tony Domenico. Cooper-Jensen ran the skydiving part of the event and Domenico coordinated the formation designs and dive plans.

== See also ==
- Base jump
- Drop zone
- Parachute
- Paratrooper
- Free-fall
- Tandem skydiving
- Wingsuit
