= Daytime Emmy Award for Outstanding Performer in Children's Programming =

The Daytime Emmy Award for Outstanding Performer in Children's Programming was an Emmy award given to performers in television programming. During the 1970s and 1980s, guest performers in dramatic specials and regular performers on children's series competed in the same category. However, starting in 1989, separate categories for performances in children's series and performances in children's specials were created and used until after 2007 when all categories related to Children's Specials were dropped.

The youngest Emmy nominee, Jodelle Ferland, was nominated in this category in 2001 at the age of six. The youngest Emmy winner, Bindi Irwin, won in 2008 at age nine.

In November 2021, the National Academy of Television Arts and Sciences announced that all Daytime Emmy categories honoring children's programming will be retired in favor of a separate Children's & Family Emmy Awards ceremony, to be held starting in 2022.

== Winners and Nominees ==
Winners in bold. For "Individual Achievement" categories, only nominees relevant to this page are listed.

=== Outstanding Individual Achievement in Children's Programming ===
1975

- Bill Cosby - Highlights of Ringling Brothers and Barnum Bailey Circus (NBC)
- Robert Keeshan - Captain Kangaroo (CBS)

1978

- **Tom Aldredge** - The CBS Festival of Lively Arts for Young People ("Henry Winkler Meets William Shakespeare") (CBS)

1979

- **Jack Gilford** - Big Blue Marble ("Hello in There") (SYN)
- **Geraldine Fitzgerald** - Special Treat ("Rodeo Red and the Runaways") (NBC)
- **Jim Henson**, **Frank Oz**, **Caroll Spinney**, **Jerry Nelson**, **Richard Hunt** - Sesame Street (PBS)

1980

- **Maia Danziger** - ABC Afterschool Special ("The Late Great Me! Story of a Teenage Alcoholic") (ABC)
- **Butterfly McQueen** - ABC Afterschool Special ("Seven Wishes of a Rich Kid") (ABC)
- **Melissa Sue Anderson** - ABC Afterschool Special ("Which Mother Is Mine?") (ABC)
- **Fred Rogers** - Mister Rogers' Neighborhood (PBS)
- Robert Keeshan - Captain Kangaroo (CBS)
- René Auberjonois - CBS Library ("Once Upon a Midnight Dreary") (CBS)

1981

- **Danny Aiello** - ABC Afterschool Special ("A Family of Strangers") (ABC)
- **Bill Cosby** - Fat Albert and the Cosby Kids (CBS)
- **Ken Howard** - The Body Human ("Facts for Boys") (CBS)
- **Marlo Thomas** - The Body Human ("Facts for Girls") (CBS)
- Scott Baio - ABC Afterschool Special ("Stoned") (ABC)
- Hal Linden - Animals, Animals, Animals ("Llama") (ABC)
- Julie Andrews - The CBS Festival of Lively Arts for Young People ("Julie Andrews' Invitation to the Dance with Rudolf Nureyev") (CBS)
- Bill Bixby - Once Upon a Classic ("A Tale Of Two Cities") (PBS)

=== Outstanding Performer in Children's Programming ===
1982

- **Robert Keeshan** - Captain Kangaroo (CBS)
- Mike Farrell - The Body Human ("Becoming a Man") (CBS)
- Cicely Tyson - The Body Human ("Becoming a Woman") (CBS)
- Rita Moreno - CBS Library ("Orphans, Waifs and Wards") (CBS)

1983

- **Cloris Leachman** - ABC Afterschool Special ("The Woman Who Willed a Miracle") (ABC)
- Kevin Dobson - CBS Afternoon Playhouse ("Help Wanted") (CBS)
- Lynn Redgrave - CBS Afternoon Playhouse ("The Shooting") (CBS)
- Fred Rogers - Mister Rogers' Neighborhood (PBS)
- Molly Picon - Young People's Specials ("Grandma Didn't Wave Back") (SYN)

1984

- **Dick Van Dyke** - CBS Library ("The Wrong Way Kid") (CBS)
- Carrie Snodgress - ABC Afterschool Special ("Andrea's Story: A Hitchhiking Tragedy") (ABC)
- Robert Keeshan - Captain Kangaroo (CBS)
- Fred Rogers - Mister Rogers' Neighborhood (PBS)

1985

- **John Carradine** - Young People's Specials ("Umbrella Jack") (SYN)
- Scott Baio - CBS Schoolbreak Special ("All the Kids Do It") (CBS)
- Betty Buckley - Special Treat ("Bobby and Sarah") (NBC)
- Richard Pryor - Pryor's Place (CBS)
- Lily Tomlin - Pryor's Place (CBS)

1986

- **Pearl Bailey** - ABC Afterschool Special ("Cindy Eller: A Modern Fairy Tale") (ABC)
- Michael York - ABC Afterschool Special ("Are You My Mother?") (ABC)
- Beau Bridges - ABC Afterschool Special ("Can a Guy Say No?") (ABC)
- Drew Barrymore - ABC Weekend Specials ("The Adventures of Con Sawyer and Hucklemary Finn") (ABC)
- LeVar Burton - Reading Rainbow (PBS)

1987

- **Madeline Kahn** - ABC Afterschool Special ("Wanted: The Perfect Guy") (ABC)
- Adolph Caesar - ABC Afterschool Special ("Getting Even: A Wimp's Revenge") (ABC)
- Ruth Buzzi - The Berenstain Bears (CBS)
- Paul Reubens - Pee-wee's Playhouse (CBS)
- LeVar Burton - Reading Rainbow (PBS)

1988

- **Philip Bosco** - ABC Afterschool Special ("Read Between The Lines") (ABC)
- Uta Hagen - ABC Afterschool Special ("Seasonal Differences") (ABC)
- James Earl Jones - CBS Schoolbreak Special ("Soldier Boys") (CBS)
- Fred Rogers - Mister Rogers' Neighborhood (PBS)
- Paul Reubens - Pee-wee's Playhouse (CBS)

=== Outstanding Performer in a Children's Special ===
1989

- **Dana Barron** - CBS Schoolbreak Special ("No Means No") (CBS)
- Betty Buckley - ABC Afterschool Special ("Taking a Stand") (ABC)
- Whoopi Goldberg - CBS Schoolbreak Special ("My Past Is My Own") (CBS)
- Lori Loughlin - CBS Schoolbreak Special ("No Means No") (CBS)
- Chad Lowe - CBS Schoolbreak Special ("No Means No") (CBS)

1990

- **Greg Spottiswood** - Looking for Miracles (Disney Channel)
- Elizabeth Bliss - ABC Afterschool Special ("Torn Between Two Fathers") (ABC)
- Elizabeth Franz - ABC Afterschool Special ("A Town's Revenge") (ABC)
- Viveca Lindfors - CBS Schoolbreak Special ("A Matter of Conscience") (CBS)
- Zachary Bennett - Looking for Miracles (Disney Channel)

1991

- **Joanne Vannicola** - CBS Schoolbreak Special ("Maggie's Secret") (CBS)
- Robyn Lively - ABC Afterschool Special ("The Less Than Perfect Daughter") (ABC)
- Richard Murphy - ABC Afterschool Special ("The Perfect Date") (ABC)
- Lycia Naff - ABC Afterschool Special ("The Perfect Date") (ABC)
- Christopher Rydell - CBS Schoolbreak Special ("Lies of the Heart") (CBS)

1992

- **Josh Hamilton** - CBS Schoolbreak Special ("Abby, My Love") (CBS)
- Stephanie Yu and Z. Wright - 3-2-1 Contact ("Secrets of the Code") (PBS)
- Alison Bartlett - ABC Afterschool Special ("It's Only Rock & Roll") (ABC)
- Matt McGrath - ABC Afterschool Special ("It's Only Rock & Roll") (ABC)
- Cara Buono - CBS Schoolbreak Special ("Abby, My Love") (CBS)

1993

- **Dina Waters** - Lifestories: Families in Crisis ("Public Law 106: The Becky Bell Story") (HBO)
- Stephanie Yu and Z. Wright - 3-2-1 Contact ("Get Busy: How Kids Can Save The Planet") (PBS)
- Monica Calhoun - CBS Schoolbreak Special ("Different Worlds: A Story of Interracial Love") (CBS)
- Duane Martin - CBS Schoolbreak Special ("Different Worlds: A Story of Interracial Love") (CBS)
- Noelle Parker - CBS Schoolbreak Special ("Different Worlds: A Story of Interracial Love") (CBS)

1994

- **Justin Whalin** - CBS Schoolbreak Special ("Other Mothers") (CBS)
- Don Murray - ABC Afterschool Special ("Montana Crossroads") (ABC)
- Christopher Miranda - ABC Weekend Special ("William Saroyan's The Parsley Garden") (ABC)
- Meredith Baxter - CBS Schoolbreak Special ("Other Mothers") (CBS)
- Joanna Cassidy - CBS Schoolbreak Special ("Other Mothers") (CBS)

1995

- **Hal Linden** - CBS Schoolbreak Special ("The Writing on The Wall") (CBS)
- Peter Billingsley - CBS Schoolbreak Special ("The Writing on The Wall") (CBS)
- Aeryk Egan - CBS Schoolbreak Special ("The Writing on The Wall") (CBS)
- Missy Crider - CBS Schoolbreak Special ("Love in the Dark Ages") (CBS)
- Ben Affleck - Lifestories: Families in Crisis ("A Body to Die For: The Aaron Henry Story") (HBO)
- Alan Thicke - The Trial of Red Riding Hood (Disney Channel)

1996

- **Kate Burton** - ABC Afterschool Specials ("Notes for My Daughter") (ABC)
- Kristen Cloke - ABC Afterschool Special ("Long Road Home") (ABC)
- Grace Johnston - ABC Afterschool Special ("Notes for My Daughter") (ABC)
- Lindsay Crouse - CBS Schoolbreak Special ("Between Mother and Daughter") (CBS)
- C. Fraser Press - CBS Schoolbreak Special ("Stand Up") (CBS)
- Patti LuPone - The Song Spinner (Showtime)

1997

- **Donna Murphy** - Lifestories: Families in Crisis ("Someone Had to be Benny") (HBO)
- Sam McMurray - ABC Afterschool Special ("Teenage Confidential") (ABC)
- Michael Shulman - Lifestories: Families in Crisis ("Someone Had to be Benny") (HBO)
- Paul Winfield - The Legend of Gator Face (Showtime)
- Brent Carver - Whiskers (Showtime)

1998

- **Robert Ri'chard** - In His Father's Shoes (Showtime)
- Louis Gossett Jr. - In His Father's Shoes (Showtime)
- Pat Carroll - The Royale (AMC)

1999

- **Jordan Kiziuk** - The Island on Bird Street (Showtime)
- Kenneth Welsh - Edison: The Wizard of Light (HBO)
- Michal Suchánek - Edison: The Wizard of Light (HBO)
- Diahann Carroll - The Sweetest Gift (Showtime)
- Keith David - The Tiger Woods Story (Showtime)

2000

- **James Earl Jones** - Summer's End (Showtime)
- Debbie Reynolds - A Gift of Love: The Daniel Huffman Story (Showtime)
- Marc Donato - Locked in Silence (Showtime)
- Bonnie Bedelia - Locked in Silence (Showtime)
- Hume Cronyn - Sea People (Showtime)

2001

- **Ossie Davis** - Finding Buck McHenry (Showtime)
- Ellen Burstyn - Mermaid (Showtime)
- Jodelle Ferland - Mermaid (Showtime)
- Peter Falk - A Storm in Summer (Showtime)
- Alfre Woodard - The Wishing Tree (Showtime)

2002

- **Kelsey Keel** - My Louisiana Sky (Showtime)
- Kevin Clash - Elmo's World: The Wild Wild West (PBS)
- Juliette Lewis - My Louisiana Sky (Showtime)
- Hume Cronyn - Off Season (Showtime)
- Stephen Rea - Snow in August (Showtime)

2003

- **Ben Foster** - Bang Bang You're Dead (Showtime)
- Tom Cavanagh - Bang Bang You're Dead (Showtime)
- Bernadette Peters - Bobbie's Girl (Showtime)
- Vanessa Williams - Our America (Showtime)
- Gregory Hines - The Red Sneakers (Showtime)

=== Outstanding Performer in a Children/Youth/Family Special ===
2004

- **Gena Rowlands** - The Incredible Mrs. Ritchie (Showtime)
- James Caan - The Incredible Mrs. Ritchie (Showtime)
- Rubén Blades - The Maldonado Miracle (Showtime)
- Peter Fonda - The Maldonado Miracle (Showtime)
- Mare Winningham - The Maldonado Miracle (Showtime)

2005

- **Stockard Channing** - Jack (Showtime)
- Jane Alexander - Carry Me Home (Showtime)
- Ron Silver - Jack (Showtime)
- Hume Cronyn - A Separate Peace (Showtime)

2006

- **James McDaniel** - Edge of America (Showtime)
- Tim Daly - Edge of America (Showtime)

2007

- **Eion Bailey** - Life of the Party (Lifetime)
- Kera O'Bryon - Assignment Discovery ("Christmas and the Civil War") (Discovery Channel)
- Elijah Wood - Saving a Species ("The Great Penguin Rescue") (Discovery Kids)

=== Outstanding Performer in a Children's Series (1989-2014) ===
1989

- **Jim Varney** - Hey Vern, It's Ernest! (CBS)
- Fred Rogers - Mister Rogers' Neighborhood (PBS)
- Barbara Billingsley - Muppet Babies (CBS)
- Sonia Manzano - Sesame Street (PBS)
- Ringo Starr - Shining Time Station (PBS)

1990

- **Kevin Clash** - Sesame Street (PBS)
- Fred Rogers - Mister Rogers' Neighborhood (PBS)
- Barbara Billingsley - Muppet Babies (CBS)
- Paul Reubens - Pee-wee's Playhouse (CBS)
- LeVar Burton - Reading Rainbow (PBS)

1991

- **Tim Curry** - Peter Pan & the Pirates (FOX)
- Edward Asner - Captain Planet and the Planeteers (TBS)
- Whoopi Goldberg - Captain Planet and the Planeteers (TBS)
- Paul Reubens - Pee-wee's Playhouse (CBS)
- LeVar Burton - Reading Rainbow (PBS)

1992

- **Shari Lewis** - Lamb Chop's Play-Along (PBS)
- Fred Rogers - Mister Rogers' Neighborhood (PBS)
- LeVar Burton - Reading Rainbow (PBS)
- Sonia Manzano - Sesame Street (PBS)
- George Carlin - Shining Time Station (PBS)

1993

- **Shari Lewis** - Lamb Chop's Play-Along (PBS)
- John Astin - The Addams Family (ABC)
- Fred Rogers - Mister Rogers' Neighborhood (PBS)
- LeVar Burton - Reading Rainbow (PBS)
- Jerry Nelson - Sesame Street (PBS)

1994

- **Shari Lewis** - Lamb Chop's Play-Along (PBS)
- LeVar Burton - Reading Rainbow (PBS)
- Ruth Buzzi - Sesame Street (PBS)
- George Carlin - Shining Time Station (PBS)
- Lynne Thigpen - Where in the World Is Carmen Sandiego? (PBS)

1995

- **Shari Lewis** - Lamb Chop's Play-Along (PBS)
- Fred Rogers - Mister Rogers' Neighborhood (PBS)
- LeVar Burton - Reading Rainbow (PBS)
- Martin P. Robinson - Sesame Street (PBS)
- Lynne Thigpen - Where in the World Is Carmen Sandiego? (PBS)

1996

- **Shari Lewis** - Lamb Chop's Play-Along (PBS)
- LeVar Burton - Reading Rainbow (PBS)
- Angela Bassett - Storytime (PBS)
- James McDaniel - Storytime (PBS)
- Lynne Thigpen - Where in the World Is Carmen Sandiego? (PBS)

1997

- **Fred Rogers** - Mister Rogers' Neighborhood (PBS)
- Bill Nye - Bill Nye the Science Guy (PBS)
- LeVar Burton - Reading Rainbow (PBS)
- Kevin Clash - Sesame Street (PBS)
- Lynne Thigpen - Where in the World Is Carmen Sandiego? (PBS)

1998

- **Bill Nye** - Bill Nye the Science Guy (PBS)
- Fred Rogers - Mister Rogers' Neighborhood (PBS)
- LeVar Burton - Reading Rainbow (PBS)
- Caroll Spinney - Sesame Street (PBS)
- Lynne Thigpen - Where in the World Is Carmen Sandiego? (PBS)

1999

- **Fred Rogers** - Mister Rogers' Neighborhood (PBS)
- Bill Nye - Bill Nye the Science Guy (PBS)
- LeVar Burton - Reading Rainbow (PBS)
- Kevin Clash - Sesame Street (PBS)
- Caroll Spinney - Sesame Street (PBS)

2000

- **Shari Lewis** - The Charlie Horse Music Pizza (PBS)
- Bill Nye - Bill Nye the Science Guy (SYN)
- Fred Rogers - Mister Rogers' Neighborhood (PBS)
- Kevin Clash - Sesame Street (PBS)

2001

- **LeVar Burton** - Reading Rainbow (PBS)
- Steve Burns - Blue's Clues (Nickelodeon)
- Donna Pescow - Even Stevens (Disney Channel)
- Fred Rogers - Mister Rogers' Neighborhood (PBS)
- Kevin Clash - Sesame Street (PBS)

2002

- **LeVar Burton** - Reading Rainbow (PBS)
- Donna Pescow - Even Stevens (Disney Channel)
- Fred Rogers - Mister Rogers' Neighborhood (PBS)
- Kevin Clash - Sesame Street (PBS)
- Mary-Kate Olsen - So Little Time (ABC Family)

2003

- **Shia LaBeouf** - Even Stevens (Disney Channel)
- Noel MacNeal - Bear in the Big Blue House (Disney Channel)
- Donna Pescow - Even Stevens (Disney Channel)
- LeVar Burton - Reading Rainbow (PBS)
- Kevin Clash - Sesame Street (PBS)

2004

- **Jeff Corwin** - Jeff Corwin Unleashed (NBC)
- Lynne Thigpen - Bear in the Big Blue House (Disney Channel)
- Kevin Clash - Sesame Street (PBS)
- David Rudman - Sesame Street (PBS)
- Michelle Trachtenberg - Truth or Scare (Discovery Kids)

2005

- **Kevin Clash** - Sesame Street (PBS)
- Donovan Patton - Blue's Clues (Nickelodeon)
- Jeff Corwin - Jeff Corwin Unleashed (Discovery Kids)
- LeVar Burton - Reading Rainbow (PBS)

2006

- **Kevin Clash** - Sesame Street (PBS)
- Sara Paxton - Darcy's Wild Life (NBC)
- J.D. Roth - Endurance (NBC)
- Julianna Rose Mauriello - LazyTown (Nickelodeon)

2007

- **Caroll Spinney** - Sesame Street (PBS)
- **Kevin Clash** - Sesame Street (PBS)
- LeVar Burton - Reading Rainbow (PBS)

2008

- **Bindi Irwin** - Bindi the Jungle Girl (Discovery Kids)
- Jack Hanna - Jack Hanna's Into the Wild (SYN)
- John Tartaglia - Johnny and the Sprites (Disney Channel)
- Kevin Clash - Sesame Street (PBS)
- Rachel Coleman - Signing Time! (PBS)

2009

- **Kevin Clash** - Sesame Street (PBS)
- Bindi Irwin - Bindi the Jungle Girl (Discovery Kids)
- Leslie Carrara - Sesame Street (PBS)
- Christopher Knowings - Sesame Street (PBS)
- Martin P. Robinson - Sesame Street (PBS)

2010

- **Joey Mazzarino** - Sesame Street (PBS)
- **Kevin Clash** - Sesame Street (PBS)
- David Rudman - Sesame Street (PBS)
- Caroll Spinney - Sesame Street (PBS)
- Christopher Knowings - Sesame Street (PBS)

2011

- **Kevin Clash** - Sesame Street (PBS)
- Caroll Spinney - Sesame Street (PBS)
- Leslie Carrara - Sesame Street (PBS)
- Eric Jacobson - Sesame Street (PBS)

2012

- **Kevin Clash** - Sesame Street (PBS)
- Caroll Spinney - Sesame Street (PBS)
- Dakota Goyo - The Haunting Hour: The Series ("Flight") (The Hub)
- Leslie Carrara - Sesame Street (PBS)

2013

- **Kevin Clash** - Sesame Street (PBS)
- Jeff Corwin - Ocean Mysteries with Jeff Corwin (ABC)
- Joey Mazzarino - Sesame Street (PBS)
- David Rudman - Sesame Street (PBS)

2014

- **Jessica Honor Carleton** - Green Screen Adventures (MeTV)
- Katie Douglas - Spooksville (HUB Network)
- Leslie Carrara - Sesame Street (PBS)
- Joey Mazzarino - Sesame Street (PBS)
- David Rudman - Sesame Street (PBS)

== Outstanding Performer in a Children's or Pre-School Children's Series (2015-2016) ==
2015

- Margot Kidder - The Haunting Hour: The Series ("Mrs. Worthington") (Discovery Family)
- Leslie Carrara-Rudolph - Sesame Street (PBS)
- Jessica Honor Carleton - Green Screen Adventures (MeTV)
- Mason Cook - R. L. Stine's The Haunting Hour: The Series ("Grandpa's Glasses") (Discovery Family)
- Joey Mazzarino - Sesame Street (PBS)

2016

- Jessica Lundy - The Inspectors (CBS)
- Jadiel Dowlin - Annedroids (Amazon)
- Addison Holley - Annedroids (Amazon)
- Sean Michael Kyer - Odd Squad (PBS)
- Terry Serpico - The Inspectors (CBS)

== Outstanding Performer in a Children's, Pre-School Children's or Family Viewing Program ==
2017

- Isaac Kragten - Odd Squad (PBS)
- Adrianna Di Liello - Annedroids (Amazon)
- Ryan Dillon - Sesame Street (HBO)
- Addison Holley - Annedroids (Amazon)
- Jack McBrayer - Odd Squad: The Movie (PBS)

== Outstanding Performer in a Children's, Preschool Children's or Educational and Informational Program ==
2018

- Dove Cameron - Liv and Maddie: Cali Style (Disney Channel)
- Kristos Andrews - This Just In (POP)
- Ed Asner - A StoryBots Christmas (Netflix)
- Michela Luci - Dino Dana (Amazon)
- Raven-Symoné - Raven's Home (Disney Channel)

== Outstanding Performer in a Children's, Family Viewing or Special Class Program ==
2019

- Michela Luci - Dino Dana: Season 2 (Amazon)
- Bill Cobbs - Dino Dana (Amazon)
- Bret Green - The Inspectors (CBS)
- Edward Norton - Ask the StoryBots: What Is Electricity? (Netflix)
- Kimberly Persona - Miss Persona (YouTube)
- Hannah VandenBygaart - ReBoot: The Guardian Code (Netflix)

== Outstanding Principal Performance in Daytime Program ==
2020

- Ryan Dillon - Sesame Street's 50th Anniversary Celebration (HBO)
- Liana Liberato - Light as a Feather (Hulu)
- Damian Toofeek Raven - The Chadwick Journals: Oren (Amazon Prime Video)
- Jordan Rodrigues - Light as a Feather (Hulu)
- Brianne Tju - Light as a Feather (Hulu)

== Outstanding Limited Performance in a Daytime Program ==
2020

- Bill Cobbs - Dino Dana: Dino Flyer (Amazon Prime Video)
- Maria Bamford - Ask the StoryBots: How Do Eyes See? (Netflix)
- Kathleen Gati - A Mermaid for Christmas (Amazon Prime Video)
- Alice Kremelberg - The Feels (YouTube.com)
- Sara Ramirez - The Feels (YouTube.com)

== Outstanding Limited Performance in a Children’s Program ==
2021

- Lupita Nyong'o - Bookmarks: Celebrating Black Voices: Lupita Nyong'o Reads Sulwe (Netflix)
- Alicia Silverstone - The Baby-Sitters Club (Netflix)
- Jennifer Barnhart - Sesame Street (HBO)
- Derek Gaines - Helpsters: Isaac Ice (Apple TV+)
- Tom Wilson - Sydney to the Max (Disney Channel)

== Outstanding Principal Performance in a Children’s Program ==
2021

- Jace Chapman - The Healing Powers of Dude (Netflix)
- Emilie Cocquerel - The New Legends of Monkey (Netflix)
- Ryan Dillon - Sesame Street (HBO)
- Nathan Lovejoy - Gabby Duran & the Unsittables (Disney Channel)
- Tyler Sanders - Just Add Magic: Mystery City (Amazon Studios)

== Outstanding Younger Performer in a Children’s Program ==
2021

- Sophie Grace - The Baby-Sitters Club (Netflix)
- Issac Ryan Brown - Raven's Home (Disney Channel)
- Sky Katz - Raven's Home (Disney Channel)
- Navia Robinson - Raven's Home (Disney Channel)
- Christian J Simon - Sydney to the Max (Disney Channel)

== Programs with multiple awards ==
16 awards

- Sesame Street

5 awards

- Lamb Chop's Play-Along

3 awards

- Mister Rogers' Neighborhood

2 awards

- Dino Dana

== Multiple wins ==
9 wins

- Kevin Clash

6 wins

- Shari Lewis

5 wins

- Caroll Spinney

3 wins

- Fred Rogers

2 wins

- LeVar Burton
