= List of fictional primates in literature =

This list of fictional primates in literature is a subsidiary to the articles of list of fictional primates and list of fictional animals. The list is restricted to notable non-human primate characters that appear in notable works of literature.

Name	Species	Origin and Author	Notes
Amy	Gorilla	Congo by Michael Crichton	A protagonist, Amy is a mountain gorilla being studied by Dr. Peter Elliot. Her normal behavior begins to start going bad when she has nightmares about the Lost City of Zinj, located in the middle of the Congo and guarded by her gorilla-chimpanzee hybrid relatives.
Babiole	Monkey	Babiole by Madame d'Aulnoy	A human princess who is transformed into a monkey by a wicked fairy.
Baavian	Baboon	Just So Stories by Rudyard Kipling	A baboon has a throne and a statue in "How the Leopard Got His Spots".
Bill Williamson	Sasquatch	State of Jefferson Stories by Harry Turtledove	A Sasquatch governor of the State of Jefferson during the late 1970s and early 1980s. He had previously been part of the Jefferson State Senate before the early 1970s, and, before entering politics, he had served as a lawyer and a realtor. He was the state's second sasquatch governor (the first being Charlie "Bigfoot" Lewis). He was married to another sasquatch, Louise, and has a daughter named Nicole. During his time as governor, Williamson did his best to insure that the state of Jefferson stayed open and diverse.
Bruno Littlemore	Chimpanzee	The Evolution of Bruno Littlemore by Benjamin Hale	The novel is told from chimpanzee Bruno Littlemore's point of view. He comments on humanity and tries to pass as a human.
Curious George	Monkey	Curious George by Margret Rey and H. A. Rey	Identified in the text as a monkey, his illustration does not correspond to a specific non-fictional species of monkey and features the characteristics of an ape, especially a chimpanzee, or a gorilla. For example, he lacks a tail (though some species of monkey, including the Barbary macaque, have little or no tail).
Comrade Monke	Black crested macaque	From the motherland, with love! by Konstantinos Petrou Kefalas	A black crested macaque, he is the protagonist of a series of short stories set during the Cold War and after. He is a soviet agent and the leader of a fictionalized version of SMERSH. He owns a cat. He is also a Christian.
Fiben Bolger	Chimpanzee	The Uplift War by David Brin	A Neo-Chimpanzee
Fern	Chimpanzee	We Are All Completely Beside Ourselves by Karen Joy Fowler	A chimpanzee raised in a human family.
Francine Frensky	Monkey	Arthur's Valentine by Marc Brown	A tomboy who loves sports, drumming, and singing. She is 8 years old, and she is the best player on her team in just about every sport they play, rivaled only by the Brain at soccer and basketball.
Hanuman	Vanara	Ramayana, The by R. K. Narayan	Ally to Rama in the classic Indian tale.
Ishmael	Gorilla	Ishmael, The Story of B, and My Ishmael by Daniel Quinn	A philosopher who was captured from the wild when young and sent to the zoo. After the zoo sold him to a menagerie, an old Jewish man bought him and could communicate with him through his mind. Ishmael teaches captivity to the unnamed narrator.
Kala	Mangani	Tarzan by Edgar Rice Burroughs	Tarzan's adoptive mother. Manganis are a fictional species of apes.
Kerchak	Mangani	Tarzan by Edgar Rice Burroughs	Leader of the manganis.
The Librarian	Orangutan	Discworld by Terry Pratchett	The Librarian appeared in the first novel of the series, The Colour of Magic, and was transformed into an orang-utan in The Light Fantastic as the Octavo fired a beam of magic upwards. On discovering that being an orang-utan had certain advantages for a librarian - he can climb up to high shelves, for example - he refused to be transformed back into a human and has remained an orang-utan ever since. The other wizards have gradually become used to the situation, to the extent that, from Night Watch: ‘if someone ever reported that there was an orang-utan in the Library, the wizards would probably go and ask the Librarian if he'd seen it.’
Lucy	Human-bonobo hybrid	Lucy by Laurence Gonzales	Brought back from a researcher's camp in war-torn Congo. The novel explores what is human and tolerance vs discrimination.
Major Monkey	Monkey	Ricky Ricotta's Mighty Robot vs. the Mecha Monkeys from Mars	The main antagonist of the book. He is a Martian monkey who hates living on Mars because it is a barren planet. Most of his time is spent creating evil robots, which are then used later on in the book to capture the robot and attempt to take over planet Earth.
Mr. Nilsson	Monkey	Pippi Longstocking by Astrid Lindgren	The pet of the titular character.
Nkima	Monkey	Tarzan by Edgar Rice Burroughs	A companion and sidekick to Tarzan, sometimes providing comic relief and at other times conveying messages between Tarzan and his allies, and occasionally leading Tarzan's Waziri warriors and other animal friends to the ape-man's rescue.
Olongo Featherstone-Haugh	Gorilla	The Probability Broach by L. Neil Smith	A gorilla that served as the Vice President of the North American Confederacy under President Jennifer Smythe on the Gallatinist Party. He elected as the 27th President of the NAC and serves from 1992 until 2000.
Ozymandias	Monkey	His Dark Materials by Philip Pullman	A golden monkey with long fur, who is not named in the books, but was given the name "Ozymandias" in the radio adaptation. A few times throughout the books, the golden monkey is shown to be capable of going much further from Mrs. Coulter than other people's dæmons,
Rotpeter	Chimpanzee or Western gorilla	"A Report to an Academy" by Franz Kafka	West African ape who is transported to Europe by hunters. He later begins to imitate the humans and learns their behaviour to escape being imprisoned in a zoo. In the end, he accomplishes his goal and is no longer able to describe his experience as an ape.
Shift	Ape	The Chronicles of Narnia by C.S. Lewis	The antagonist of The Last Battle, which is the last book of the series. Shift is an ape who, like many animals in Lewis' work, can talk.
Sun Wukong	Monkey	Journey to the West by Wu Cheng'en	The Monkey King from classic Chinese literature.
The Wickersham Brothers	Monkeys	Horton Hears a Who! by Dr. Seuss	A group of mischievous monkeys who torment Horton. In the original 1954 book by Dr. Seuss, they are illustrated as generic or gibbon-like monkeys. However, their design varies across adaptations. In the 2008 animated film, they were redesigned to be more bonobo-like.
Unnamed	Orangutan	"The Murders in the Rue Morgue" by Edgar Allan Poe	The true murderer of Madame L'Espanaye and her daughter, as deduced by C. Auguste Dupin.
Unnamed	Monkey	Falling Up by Shel Silverstein	A monkey that ate green bananas and almost died due to being unable to digest them. He is featured in a poem in the book called "The Monkey".
Unnamed White Ape Princess	Ape	"Facts Concerning the Late Arthur Jermyn and His Family" by H. P. Lovecraft	The horror descended from the marriage and children of Sir Wade Jermyn and the White Ape Princess.
Zéphir	Monkey	Babar the Elephant	Good friend of Babar.
Zoey	Orangutan	Zoey & Me by Mallory Lewis	A baby orangutan who was brought into the Miles' family after being rejected by her mother. Zoey is very playful and curious, which is the biggest reason she gets into tight, and sometimes fatal, situations.

== See also ==
- List of fictional primates
