= The Song That Doesn't End =

Children's song

Song by Shari Lewis

from the album Lamb Chop's Sing-Along, Play-Along
- Length: Indefinite (2:25 on album version)
- Songwriter: Norman Martin

"The Song That Doesn't End" is a self-referential and infinitely iterative children's song. The song appears in an album by puppeteer Shari Lewis titled Lamb Chop's Sing-Along, Play-Along, released through a 1988 home video. It is a single-verse-long song, written in an infinite-loop motif in a march style, such that it naturally flows in a cyclical fashion, repeating the same verse over and over. The song was written by Shari Lewis' long time producer Norman Martin.

== Lyrics ==
This is the song that doesn't end
Yes, it goes on and on, my friend
Some people started singing it not knowing what it was,
And they’ll continue singing it forever just because
[Repeats]

=== Variations ===
Alternative versions of the song use "never ends", and use the plural "friends". Other minor discrepancies in the lyrics may be due to the song being passed in the oral tradition from person-to-person. Such differences include "It just goes on and on..." (line 2), "And we’ll continue" (line 4), " and they continued" (line 4), "and they'll keep singing and singing and singing just because" (line 4), “this is the song that killed my friends” (line 2), and "and they'll keep on" (line 4). A method that is sometimes used to end the song is to repeat "doesn't end" (line 1) as if the singer is a skipping record player.

== Notable appearances and recordings ==
The first official record was the release of a home video in 1988, distributed by Fries Home Video, a subdivision of Fries Entertainment, Inc. A version of the song was used as the closing theme of Lamb Chop's Play-Along, a 1992 televised puppet show on PBS. At the end of each episode, the puppets and children sang the verses of the song while hostess Shari Lewis would try in vain to stop them. They would eventually leave on her urging, even while beginning a sixth verse (which eventually fades away). Finally, at the end of the end credits, the puppet character Charlie Horse would return and try to get to sing the song again, until Lewis successfully stops him a final time by covering his mouth. She orders him to "go away" (and not bring the song back in her sight ever again). As he obediently gets out of her sight, he slams the door (before she could tell him not to).

A short rendition of the song appeared in a skit on the animated TV series Cartoon Planet and the series' companion album Space Ghost's Musical Bar-B-Que. Brak sings the song until he is asked to stop by Zorak, who finds it annoying. Brak explains that he is unable to because it's the "song that doesn't end." He attempts to continue until Zorak loses his temper, causing Brak to cease, remarking, "I guess it just ended."

Fans of the rock band Styx adopted a variation, "The Tour That Never Ends", to describe Styx's 400-plus date tour in the late 1990s in support of their album Brave New World.

A series of Canadian Motrin pain reliever ads featured kids singing the song in the back of a car, during a traffic jam, while eating chocolate-covered coffee beans.

In the Annoying Orange it appeared in episode "Monster Burger 2", Orange singing it at the beginning, but it's suddenly rips of as he sees the burger.

Also, in the Annoying Orange episode "A Loud Place", Orange and his friends are singing the song at the beginning of the episode while in a band rehearsing.

In season 2 episode 10 of Good Girls, Annie Marks sings the version of the song with the lyrics "This is the song that never ends".

In an episode of Smart Guy, Yvette and Moe sing a version of this song to annoy a man while trying to win a car in a competition to see who can stay in the car the longest.

Jordan Raskopoulos (formerly of The Axis of Awesome) sang a 5-hour 31 minute version (viewable on YouTube), raising "a bunch of cash" for LGBTQIA+ youth organisation Twenty10.

A version of this song is sung in the episode "Puppet Bride" of My Life as a Teenage Robot in an attempt to torment Norma Wakeman. She is rescued by X-J9, prompting her response "Well, what do you know, the song DOES end".

== See also ==
- "John Jacob Jingleheimer Schmidt"
- "Michael Finnegan"
- "Campfire Song Song" from SpongeBob's Greatest Hits
