= Lamb Chop (puppet) =

Sock puppet sheep

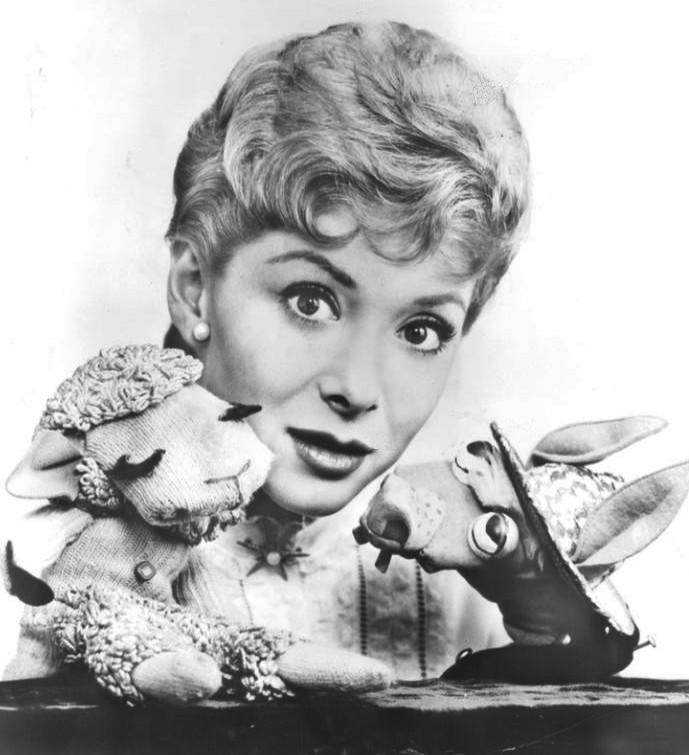
Shari Lewis and her puppets Lamb Chop and Charlie Horse from The Ford Show, 1960

Lamb Chop is an anthropomorphic sheep sock puppet created by the puppeteer and ventriloquist Shari Lewis. The character first appeared during Lewis's guest appearance on Captain Kangaroo in March 1956 and later appeared on Hi Mom (1957–1959), a local morning show that aired on WRCA-TV in New York, New York.

== History ==
=== Concept and creation ===
Lamb Chop has been described as a "6-year-old girl, very intuitive and very feisty, a combination of obstinacy and vulnerability...you know how they say fools rush in where wise men fear to go? Well, Lamb Chop would rush in, then scream for help." Lamb Chop, in all her shows, had referred to her close friend, a girl named Lolly Pincus.

From 1960 to 1963, Lewis had her own musical-comedy network television program, The Shari Lewis Show. As children's programming turned more towards animation in the mid-1960s, she continued to perform in a wide range of venues.

In 1992, Lamb Chop and Lewis began their own PBS children's show, Lamb Chop's Play-Along, an Emmy Award winner for five consecutive years. The show was approximately 25 minutes per episode. On PBS, it premiered September 10, 1992 and was last shown on January 1, 1997. From 2007 to 2009, it was shown on Qubo.

In 1993, when Lewis appeared before the U.S. Congress in an oversight hearing on the Children's Television Act, Lamb Chop provided her own testimony.

In 1998, Lamb Chop co-starred with Lewis on the short-lived spin-off The Charlie Horse Music Pizza. The show was canceled after Lewis' death in 1998. The last episode of The Charlie Horse Music Pizza aired on January 17, 1999.

Before her death, Shari Lewis sold the rights of Lamb Chop to Golden Books Family Entertainment. When Golden filed for bankruptcy, Classic Media (later renamed DreamWorks Classics and now part of NBCUniversal) acquired Golden's entertainment catalog.

=== Mallory Lewis reimagining ===
Two years after Lewis died in 1998, her daughter, producer and writer Mallory Lewis, began to perform with Lamb Chop. Mallory Lewis had worked closely with her mother when producing Lamb Chop's Play-Along and The Charlie Horse Music Pizza. About her mother and Lamb Chop she said:

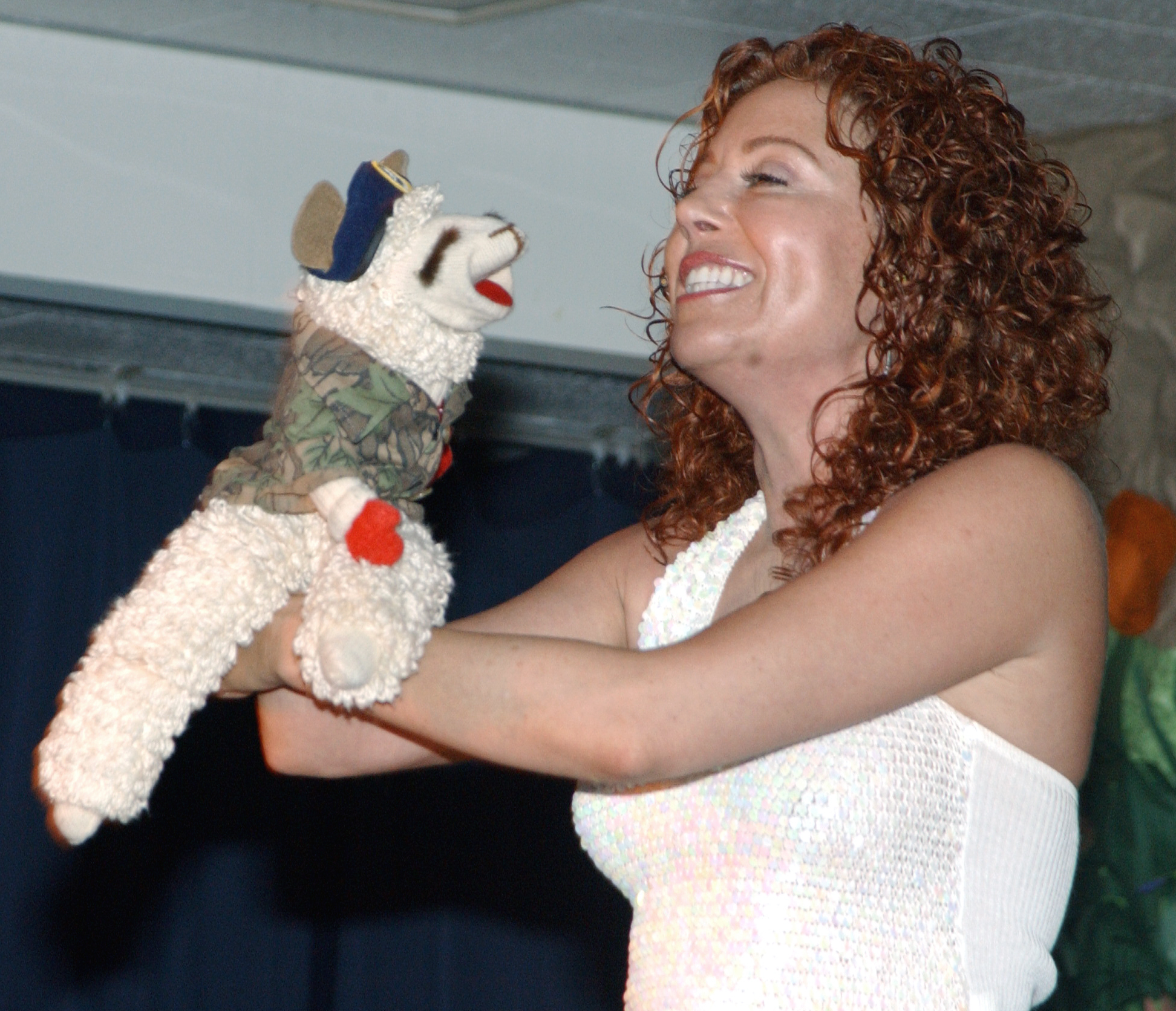
Shari Lewis's daughter, Mallory Lewis, with Lamb Chop in 2004

My mom was one of the world's greatest entertainers. I don't want to challenge that. I don't think it's wise to go there. But I do want to do everything that I can do for Lamb Chop. I'll help keep her going.

Shari Lewis's other puppet, Hush Puppy, made his comeback at the Iowa State Fair in 2010. Until 2024 Mallory Lewis did not perform Charlie Horse, as doing his voice was hard on her vocal cords. He did make a comeback via social media videos in early 2024. Lewis's daughter still owns the live performing rights to the Lamb Chop characters.

Mallory Lewis and Lamb Chop perform mainly for the US military. Lamb Chop is an honorary three-star general in the Marines.

Mallory Lewis described Lamb Chop's values as a "liberal Jewish Democrat".

=== In popular culture ===
Shari Lewis and Lamb Chop guest starred in an episode of The Nanny entitled "Lamp Chop's On the Menu".

Lamb Chop is featured in the 2023 documentary Shari & Lamb Chop.

==== Popularity as a dog toy ====
In the 21st century, Lamb Chop would see renewed popularity – including with audiences unfamiliar with the original television programmes – in the form of a dog toy first released by MultiPet International under license from the eventual copyright holder for the character, DreamWorks Classics, in 2010, with PetSmart sales exceeding those of more modern characters such as SpongeBob SquarePants and The Lion King's Simba in 2025. These toys would gain the nickname of "Lambie" or "Lamby" among dog owners. The phenomenon of dogs growing attached to Lamb Chop toys has been jokingly referred to as a "dog cult" by internet personalities. Mallory Lewis does not receive royalties from the toys, but stated satisfaction for their popularity as they keep the character in the public eye.
