= The Shari Lewis Show =

1960–1976 NBC and BBC One television series

- Presented by: Shari Lewis
- Country of origin: United States
- Original language: English

Production
- Running time: 30 minutes (NBC); 10-15 minutes (BBC One)
- Production company: Tarcher Productions

Original release
- Network: NBC (1960-1963); BBC One (1968-1976)
- Release: October 1, 1960 – August 28, 1976

Related
- Lamb Chop's Play-Along

The Shari Lewis Show is an American children's television program that first appeared on NBC Saturday mornings from October 1, 1960 to September 28, 1963, and then on BBC One from April 13, 1968 to August 28, 1976.

== Premise ==
The show starred Shari Lewis, who was both the show's host and the puppeteer for the characters Lamb Chop, Hush Puppy, and Charlie Horse. The show also starred Ronald Radd, who played Mr. Goodfellow and Clive Russell, who made his television debut on the series. Fred Gwynne also made appearances as Lamb Chop's doctor. Lamb Chop made her debut on Captain Kangaroo in 1956. The show was awarded a Peabody Award in 1961. Despite warm reviews, the show was cancelled after three seasons.

== NBC series ==
The NBC series premiered on October 1, 1960 as part of NBC's Saturday morning lineup, which replaced Howdy Doody. The show ran until September 28, 1963.

== BBC One series ==
In 1968, BBC One picked up the series, broadcasting from 13 April 1968 to 28 August 1976. The series was picked up at a time when the BBC was experimenting with using American performers in light entertainment.

== Archive ==
Almost no full episodes of the NBC show are known to exist today. The original tapes of many episodes were wiped and reused by NBC to record coverage of the 1964 Democratic and Republican national conventions. Lewis said in an interview decades later that this "was a shame, since the shows were beautifully done as a showcase of NBC's early color broadcast work." However, some episodes and some clips of the show have survived, and the existing footage was restored by the UCLA Film and Television Archive, and some episodes are available on DVD.

The same fate has befallen the BBC series, but a few episodes are known to exist.
