= Love, Gilda =

2018 documentary directed by Lisa D'Apolito

- Film Poster
- Directed by: Lisa D'Apolito
- Produced by: Bronwyn Berry; Lisa D'Apolito; Meryl Goldsmith; James Tumminia
- Starring: Gilda Radner; Amy Poehler; Melissa McCarthy; Bill Hader; Maya Rudolph; Lorne Michaels; Jordan Walker-Perlman; Cecily Strong; Martin Short; Laraine Newman; Chevy Chase; Paul Shaffer; Stephen Schwartz; Andrew Alexander
- Cinematography: Rob Featherstone; Nick Higgins
- Edited by: Anne Alvergue; David Cohen
- Music by: Miriam Cutler
- Production companies: 3 Faces Films; Motto Pictures
- Distributed by: Magnolia Pictures (USA) (theatrical); CNN Films (USA) (TV)
- Release dates: April 18, 2018 (Tribeca Film Festival); September 21, 2018
- Running time: 88 minutes
- Countries: United States; Canada
- Language: English
- Box office: $616,849 (US)

Love, Gilda is a 2018 documentary film directed and co-produced by Lisa D'Apolito. The film is about the life and career of American comedian Gilda Radner. Love, Gilda premiered on April 18, 2018, at the Tribeca Film Festival and was limited released in the United States on September 21, 2018. The film received widespread acclaim from critics.

== Synopsis ==
The film presents the life and career of Gilda Radner through her own eyes using her diaries, audio tapes, home movies and interviewing some of her closest friends at that time.

== Cast ==
- Gilda Radner (archive footage)
- Amy Poehler
- Melissa McCarthy
- Bill Hader
- Chevy Chase
- Janis Hirsch
- Lorne Michaels
- Jordan Walker-Pearlman
- Laraine Newman
- Maya Rudolph
- Stephen Schwartz
- Alan Zweibel
- Rosie Shuster
- Martin Short
- Andrew Alexander
- Anne Beatts
- Robin Zweibel
- Michael Radner
- Paul Shaffer

== Reception ==
On review aggregator Rotten Tomatoes, Love, Gilda has an approval rating of 89% based on 89 reviews, with an average rating of 7.3/10. The site's critical consensus reads: "Love, Gilda pays gentle, unequivocal tribute to its subject with more than enough of her genuine spirit to compensate for a lack of critical distance or truly fresh insight." Metacritic, which uses a weighted average, assigned a score of 74 out of 100, based on 26 critics, indicating "generally favorable" reviews.

David Fear from Rolling Stone however gave the film two and a half stars out of five, stating: "In terms of both professional best-of moments and personal artifacts (home movies, old pics, those journals and cassette recordings), the filmmaker has a treasure trove at her fingertips; she just doesn't seem to know how to shape much of it, or how to mine it for more than checkpoints and pop-psychological carping about comedy and pain."

Matt Zoller Seitz writing for the website RogerEbert.com gave Love, Gilda three out of four stars and said: "Director Lisa D'Apolito's documentary is at its best detailing Radner's struggle to make her voice heard in a field that she adored, but that wasn't often hospitable to women, even when the individual men in it thought they were being gracious and inclusive." Jason Zinoman from The New York Times called the film "a portrait of a brief and brilliant career" and completed: "Where the movie succeeds best is as an illumination of her charm and spirit. Ms. Radner played eccentric characters with raucous abandon and jangly big-kid physicality, but she also projected a vulnerability that made you care for them. The movie explores some of her insecurities, particularly with regard to her eating disorder, but its tone never strays too far from the light and breezy."
