= Sock puppet =

Puppet worn over the hand and upper arm

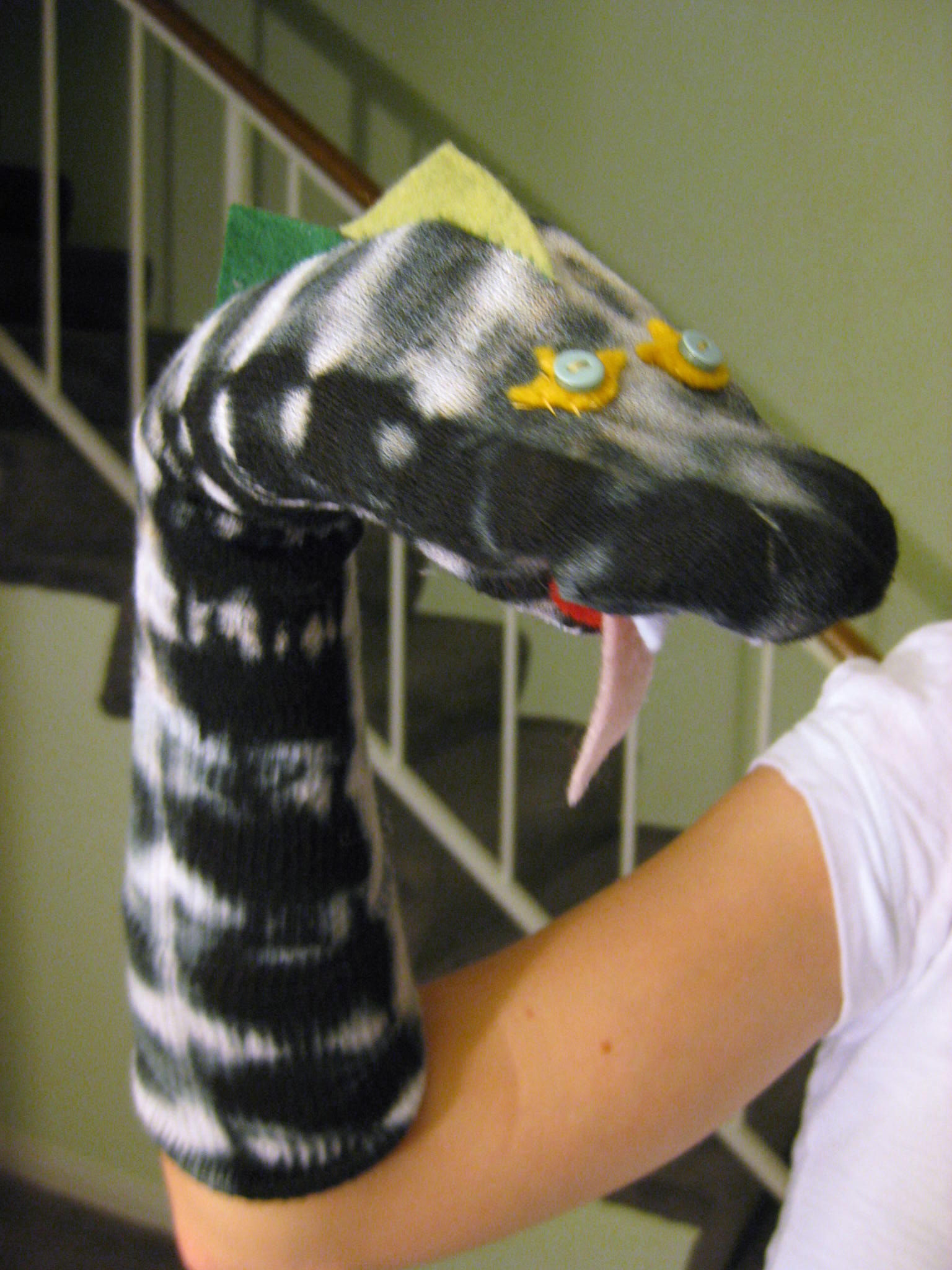
A sock puppet decorated to look like a snake

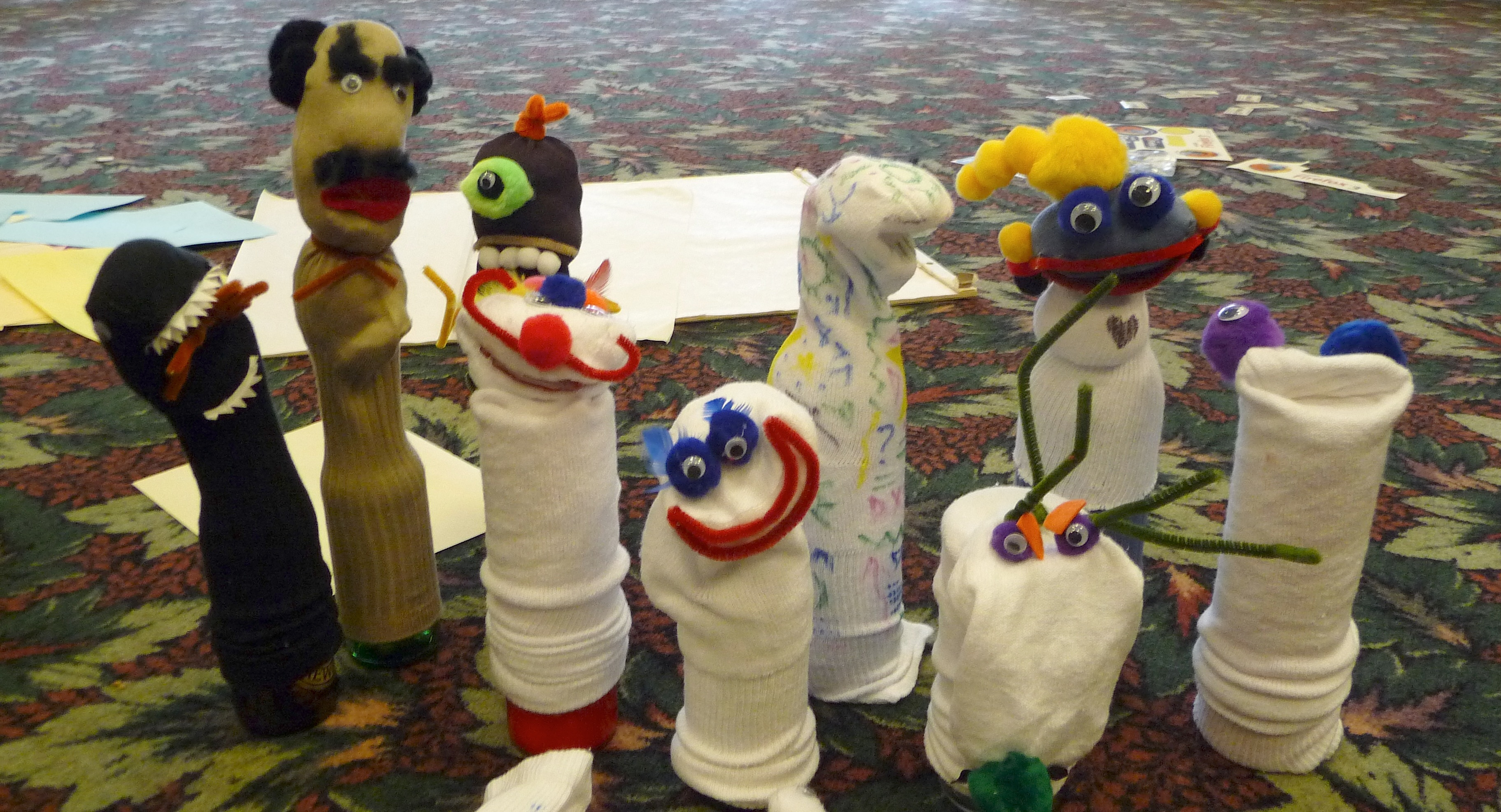
A collection of sock puppets

A sock puppet, sockpuppet, sock-puppet, or sock poppet is a puppet made from a sock or a similar garment. The puppeteer wears the sock on a hand and lower arm as if it were a glove, with the puppet's mouth being formed by the region between the sock's heel and toe, and the puppeteer's thumb acting as the jaw. The arrangement of the fingers forms the shape of a mouth, which is sometimes padded with a hard piece of felt, often with a tongue glued inside.

The sock is stretched out fully so that it is long enough to cover the puppeteer's wrist and part of the arm. Often, the puppeteer hides behind a stand and raises the hand above it so that only the puppet is visible. Sock puppeteers may also stand in full view along with their puppets and hold conversations with them through using ventriloquism.

== Composition ==
Sock puppets can be made from socks or stockings of any color. Any sock may be used to create a puppet, but socks that are too tattered may fall apart during a performance, so they are usually bought new. Additions can be glued on in order to give the sock a personality. Streamers and felt strings might be glued on for hair. Buttons or googly eyes (obtained from craft or fabric stores) are used for the puppet's eyes.

== Uses ==
Sock puppets are often used for the education and entertainment of children. They can be used in elaborate puppet shows or children's plays, much as marionettes would be. The process of making sock puppets is popularly taught as a creative activity in elementary schools. Many schools teach children to make sock puppets, which the students use to stage a play or musical.

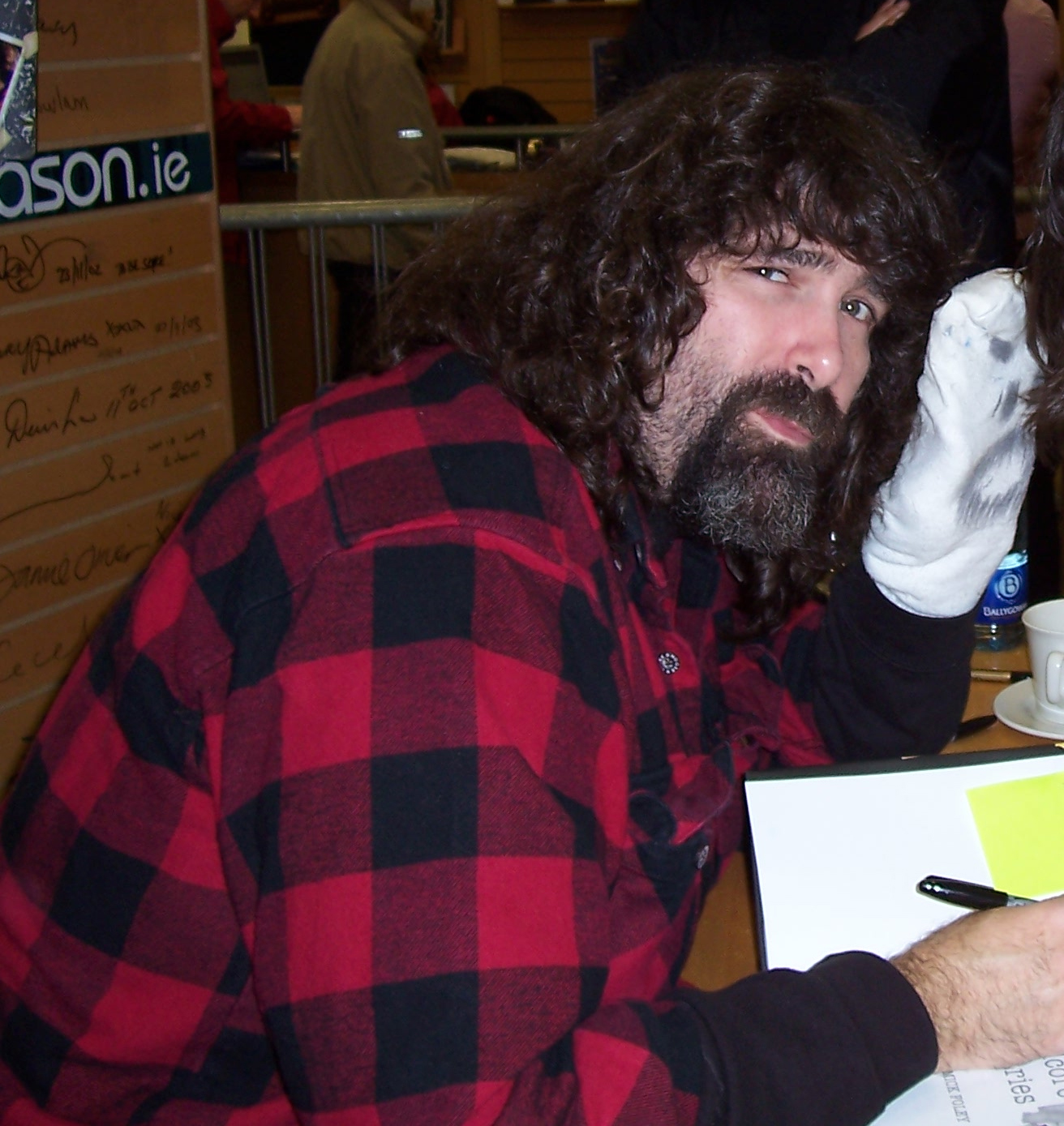
Pro wrestler Mick Foley and his accomplice, Mr. Socko

Sock puppets appear in children's television series where they can be used alone on the puppeteer's hand, without a complex stage or show. Two orange sock puppets named Fu and Fara are used in teaching German children how to read. In the United States, children's entertainer Shari Lewis was known for her television show Lamb Chop's Play-Along featuring the sock puppets Lamb Chop, Charlie Horse, and Hush Puppy. Sock puppets are often used because they are less intimidating and scary, and, therefore, very child-friendly. In Bo Burnham's Inside, one of his skits (How the World Works) is a parody of these shows where his sock puppet "Socko" tries to teach children about various injustices and conspiracy theories (such as the FBI killing Martin Luther King or the possibility of an elitist child sex ring).

Sock puppets have also been used in television programming aimed at adults. The 1980s saw the introduction of the Ed the Sock character on local cable in Toronto, and the Sifl and Olly show aired on MTV in the 1990s. Both of these were aimed at teenagers and young adults. Sock puppets have also appeared in advertising geared towards adults. During the late 1990s, the e-commerce company Pets.com used a "spokespuppet" in its advertising to much critical acclaim.

Sock puppets have also been used as the main figures in comedy videos on the internet, mostly to parody other media phenomena such as films and television series. Additionally, sock puppets have been used in a variety of Human Resource videos to aid in the education of employees regarding effective business practices.

Professional wrestler Mick Foley has long used a sock puppet by the name of Mr. Socko as an aid in his finishing maneuver, a nerve hold called the Mandible Claw (or Socko Claw), which is usually preceded by Foley theatrically pulling the sock from somewhere on his person. On World Wrestling Entertainment's Raw program, this has traditionally been a cue for commentator Jerry Lawler to complain about "that stinking, sweaty sock!" Mr. Socko has often served as a sidekick for Foley's Mankind character, having been introduced to the world during a skit on WWE television as a means of "cheering up" WWE owner Vince McMahon, who had just been beaten by nemesis Stone Cold Steve Austin. The sock puppet unexpectedly became a hit with wrestling fans, garnering chants from a crowd of more than 10,000 at the following week's program.

== See also ==
- Hand puppet – Puppet controlled by hands
- Muppets – Puppet characters created by Jim Henson
- Sock puppet account – False online identity used for deception
- Sock monkey – Stuffed toy
- Finger puppet – Simple puppet worn on individual fingers
