= Lisa D'Apolito =

American film director and producer

Lisa D'Apolito is an American film director and producer. Her film Love, Gilda was nominated for the 2019 Emmy for Outstanding Documentary or Nonfiction Special.

== Filmography ==
- Shari & Lamb Chop (2023)
- Love, Gilda (2018)
