= The Charlie Horse Music Pizza =

American children's television series

- Genre: Preschool
- Created by: Shari Lewis; Jeremy Tarcher
- Developed by: Mallory Tarcher; Shari Lewis; Bernard Rothman
- Written by: Shari Lewis; Mallory Tarcher; Bernard Rothman
- Directed by: Niles Davenport; Stan Jacobson
- Presented by: Shari Lewis
- Starring: Shari Lewis; Lamb Chop; Charlie Horse; Hush Puppy; Dom DeLuise; Wezley Morris; Chancz Perry; Chantal Strand
- Opening theme: "Charlie Horse Music Pizza"
- Ending theme: "Still Be Friends" (22 episodes)
- Country of origin: United States
- Original language: English
- No. of seasons: 2
- No. of episodes: 23

Production
- Executive producer: Bernard Rothman
- Producer: Shawn Williamson
- Running time: 30 minutes
- Production companies: Golden Books Family Entertainment; KCET

Original release
- Network: PBS Kids
- Release: January 5, 1998 – January 17, 1999

Related
- Lamb Chop's Play-Along

The Charlie Horse Music Pizza is an American children's television show that was shown on PBS Kids in the United States from January 5, 1998, to January 17, 1999, with reruns continuing to air until September 5, 1999. Reruns again aired on PBJ until 2016. It is the short-lived spin-off of Lamb Chop's Play-Along and was hosted by Shari Lewis, whose strong belief in the benefits of music education for children led to the creation of the series. The Charlie Horse Music Pizza was shot at the CBC Studios in Vancouver, British Columbia, Canada. The Charlie Horse Music Pizza was Lewis's final project.

== Cast ==
- Wezley Morris as Junior
- Chancz Perry as Take Out
- Gordon Robertson as Fingers
- Dom DeLuise as Cookie

== Premise ==
The series takes place around a pizzeria on the beach. Alongside the original cast of Lamb Chop, Hush Puppy, Charlie Horse, and Lewis, Charlie Horse Music Pizza introduced five new characters: Take Out, a big anthropomorphized dim-witted orangutan who makes deliveries on roller skates (played by Chancz Perry); Fingers, a giant, sassy purple raccoon that lives in the dumpster behind the pizzeria (played by Gordon Robertson); Cookie, the soft-hearted opera loving cook (played by Dom DeLuise), Junior, a cool teenager who works at the pizzeria part time and plays the tuba for his high school marching band (played by Wezley Morris), and Holly, a young girl in a wheelchair (played by Chantal Strand).

== Episodes ==
| Season | Episodes | Originally aired (U.S. dates) | |
| Season | Episodes | Season premiere | Season finale |
|---|---|---|---|
| 1 | 20 | January 5, 1998 | January 30, 1998 |
| 2 | 3 | January 3, 1999 | January 17, 1999 |

=== Season 1 (1998) ===
| # | List of episodes | Release date |
|---|---|---|
| 1 | Back Story | January 5, 1998 |
| 2 | My Dog Has Fleas | January 6, 1998 |
| 3 | Musicians of Bremen | January 7, 1998 |
| 4 | Blow Hard | January 8, 1998 |
| 5 | Follow the Leader | January 9, 1998 |
| 6 | Spooky Opera Show | January 12, 1998 |
| 7 | A Pirate's Life | January 13, 1998 |
| 8 | The Audition | January 14, 1998 |
| 9 | Group Soup | January 15, 1998 |
| 10 | Rapunzel | January 16, 1998 |
| 11 | Toy Exchange | January 19, 1998 |
| 12 | Charlie on the Run | January 20, 1998 |
| 13 | Wise Queen | January 21, 1998 |
| 14 | Star-Spangled Charlie | January 22, 1998 |
| 15 | Charlie's Ant | January 23, 1998 |
| 16 | Whistle While You Work | January 26, 1998 |
| 17 | Jazzy | January 27, 1998 |
| 18 | Hush Puppy the Hero | January 28, 1998 |
| 19 | Can I Sing You My Song? | January 29, 1998 |
| 20 | Drum Show | January 30, 1998 |

=== Season 2 (1999) ===
| # | List of episodes | Release date |
|---|---|---|
| 21 | One Man Band | January 3, 1999 |
| 22 | The George & Bill Show | January 10, 1999 |
| 23 | Hello, Goodbye | January 17, 1999 |

== Cancellation ==
When Lamb Chop's Play-Along! ended, Lewis and her husband Jeremy Tarcher created The Charlie Horse Music Pizza to teach children about music after talking about what kids loved the most. Because a third of elementary schools were cutting music class from their curriculum at the time, Lewis and Tarcher felt that they should introduce kids to music through the show. Lewis was diagnosed with inoperable uterine cancer, and the show was put on hold on June 18, 1998, while she underwent chemotherapy at Cedars-Sinai Hospital. She died from viral pneumonia on August 2, 1998. After her death, The Charlie Horse Music Pizza was cancelled. The last episode of The Charlie Horse Music Pizza aired on January 17, 1999, on what would have been her 66th birthday.

=== Awards ===
| Year | Nominee / work | Award | Result |
|---|---|---|---|
| 2000 | Shari Lewis for playing "Host" (posthumous award; accepted by Mallory Tarcher Lewis) | Daytime Emmy Award for Outstanding Performer in a Children's Series | Won |
