= Lamb Chop's Play-Along =

American preschool children's television series

- Genre: Children's television series
- Written by: Lan O'Kun; Bernard Rothman
- Directed by: Michael Watt; Stan Jacobson
- Presented by: Shari Lewis
- Starring: Shari Lewis; Lamb Chop; Charlie Horse; Hush Puppy
- Opening theme: "It's Lamb Chop's Play-Along!"
- Ending theme: "The Song That Doesn't End"
- Composers: Bob Golden; John Rodby
- Countries of origin: Canada; United States
- Original language: English
- No. of seasons: 4
- No. of episodes: 85

Production
- Production locations: Burnaby and Vancouver, British Columbia, Canada
- Running time: 30 minutes
- Production companies: Paragon Entertainment Corporation; WTTW Chicago

Original release
- Network: PBS
- Release: January 13, 1992 – September 22, 1995

Related
- The Charlie Horse Music Pizza

Lamb Chop's Play-Along! is a half-hour children's television series aimed at toddlers that was shown on PBS in the United States from January 13, 1992, until September 22, 1995, with reruns airing on PBS until January 4, 1998, and on KTV FAVE - KIDZ in 2019. It was created and hosted by the puppeteer Shari Lewis, and featured her puppet characters Lamb Chop, Charlie Horse, and Hush Puppy. The series was based on several home videos Lewis created throughout the 1980s, particularly the 1988 video Lamb Chop's Sing-Along, Play-Along. Lamb Chop's Play-Along! was followed by the short-lived spin-off series, The Charlie Horse Music Pizza.

== Premise ==
Lamb Chop is an anthropomorphic sheep puppet who lives with her guardian Shari Lewis and her two siblings, Charlie Horse (an anthropomorphic horse) and Hush Puppy (an anthropomorphic dog). In each episode, Lewis encourages the audience to participate or interact in a number of activities through several segments, including those involving crafts, songs and stories. The shows are wrapped around with a multiple-act segment known as At Home With Lamb Chop, which typically revolves around a situation involving one of the puppet characters.

== Production ==
PBS commissioned the show from Shari Lewis in May 1991, and the show premiered in January 1992. This marked Lewis' return to television after about 15 years (following the BBC version of The Shari Lewis Show in 1975). Lamb Chop's Play-Along was shot in Canada, first in Burnaby, British Columbia and then at the CBC Studios in Vancouver, British Columbia.

The series honored Lewis' father, college professor Abraham Hurwitz, who died in 1981. He is referred to as "the official magician of New York City".

Ellensburg Daily Record said "each half hour is filled with jokes, games, songs, and tricks".

== Broadcast ==
WTTW jointly distributed it with Paragon Entertainment Corporation to PBS stations across the country. The rights to the show are currently owned by Universal Television on behalf of DreamWorks Classics.

== Format ==
=== Philosophy ===
Shari Lewis explained her goal for the audience is "participation, not passive observance". She said: "our goal is, don't just sit there - come play with me". She wanted to "attack the shorter attention span of today's children with a fast-paced show using colorful electronic effects". She said in an interview with The Philadelphia Inquirer: "I know that when children watch TV, they go into a stupor. Parents think (their children) are interested, but what they really are is [bored]".

Lewis testified that making smart content for children was not that hard to produce and should be done with increasing frequency. She explained that if children are challenged, they will be productive members of society. She said, "I don't care if you tack a prosocial message at the end of the show. You have not done a quality show".

=== Opening and closing sequences ===
Both the opening and closing songs were written by Broadway composer Norman Martin. Other songs were written by Square One TV songwriter, John Rodby. Two versions of the opening song with different lyrics have been used; one involves bouncing, and the other strength. The ending theme song is "The Song That Doesn't End", as sung by the children and puppets while Lewis frantically attempts to stop them. The children and puppets eventually leave at Shari's urging, and the song fades even before beginning a sixth verse. Finally, at the end of the end credits sequence, Charlie Horse returns and tries to get to sing the song again but Lewis successfully stops him (by putting her hand over his mouth). She then orders him to go away and not let the song back in her sight again. As Charlie leaves, he slams the door before Lewis could tell him to close the door properly. Despite Charlie slamming the door, her only consolation is that everything is now silent (as a result of Charlie, the other puppets, and the singing group children "gone"). However, she glares at the viewers at fade-out.

An instrumental version of the show's theme song was used for a most recent show of Mallory Lewis (daughter of the show's host) and Lamb Chop.

== Cast ==
- Shari Lewis as Herself/Lamb Chop/Charlie Horse/Hush Puppy
- Pat Brymer as the head puppeteer
- Gord Robertson as Buster the Bus, featured puppeteer
- Norma McKnight as additional puppetry
- Bonnie Martin as Big Lamb Chop
- Mark Gamez as Big Charlie Horse

=== Lamb Chop's Playmates ===
- Andrew Francis
- Brian Ito
- Amanda McAdam
- Sabrina Sánchez
- Kevin Yee
- Rachel Sandor-Gough
- Talia Gilboa
- Bryan Robinson
- Zack Moses
- Phillip Boutte
- Annick Obonsawin
- John Creery
- Ramon Choyce
- Jade Schwartz
- Emma Pollard
- Maddie Lewis

== Episodes ==
85 half-hour episodes produced.

=== Season 1 (1992) ===
1. Air Charlie (4 acts) [January 13, 1992]
2. Stop Biting Your Nails (4 acts) [January 14, 1992]
3. Too Sick to Go to the Circus (5 acts) [January 15, 1992]
4. The Bully (4 acts) [January 16, 1992]
5. Hiccups (3 acts) [January 17, 1992]
6. Charlie's Magic Show (2 acts) [January 20, 1992]
7. Lamb Chop Works Out (4 acts) [January 21, 1992]
8. The Charlie Horse Newspaper (4 acts) [January 22, 1992]
9. Robin Hoof (3 acts) [January 23, 1992]
10. Charlie's Toothache (4 acts) [January 24, 1992]
11. The Baseball Show (3 acts) [January 27, 1992]
12. The Planet Yzarc (4 acts) [January 28, 1992]
13. Maurice (3 acts) [January 29, 1992]
14. Charlie Horse Western (4 acts) [January 30, 1992]
15. Runaway (5 acts) [January 31, 1992]
16. The Lemonade Wars (4 acts) [February 3, 1992]
17. Have I Got A Girl For You (4 acts) [February 4, 1992]
18. Lamb Chop's Make-Over (4 acts) [February 5, 1992]
19. The Ring (4 acts) [February 6, 1992]
20. Charlie Horse's Birthday (4 acts) [February 7, 1992]
21. Grown Up For A Day (4 acts) [February 10, 1992]
22. Charlie Horse For Class President (4 acts) [February 11, 1992]
23. Shari's Obedience School (4 acts) [February 12, 1992]
24. The Necklace (4 acts) [February 13, 1992]
25. The Chicken Show [February 14, 1992]
26. Lamb Chop's Allowance (4 acts) [February 17, 1992]
27. Talent-Less (3 acts) [February 18, 1992]
28. On Thin Ice (3 acts) [February 19, 1992]
29. Bigger Is Better (2 acts) [February 20, 1992]
30. Lamb Chop: Star [February 21, 1992]

=== Season 2 (1993) ===
1. So Long Freddy (3 acts) [February 8, 1993]
2. Shari Makes a Beanstalk [February 9, 1993]
3. School Daze (3 acts) [February 10, 1993]
4. The Circus (1 act) [February 11, 1993]
5. I'm Back! (2 acts) [February 12, 1993]
6. What's Your Name? [February 15, 1993]
7. Farnsworth (3 acts) [February 16, 1993]
8. A Cat By Any Other Name (3 acts) [February 17, 1993]
9. Born To Dance (3 acts) [February 18, 1993]
10. Super Angelo (3 acts) [February 19, 1993]
11. I Write The Songs (1 act) [March 8, 1993]
12. United We Stand (3 acts) [March 9, 1993]
13. Lucky Puppy (3 acts) [March 10, 1993]
14. The Wallet (3 acts) [March 11, 1993]
15. Twinkle, Twinkle (3 acts) [March 12, 1993]
16. The Return of Zark (3 acts) [March 15, 1993]
17. Fear of Biking (3 acts) [March 16, 1993]
18. Segnorita Lamb Chop (3 acts) [March 17, 1993]
19. Forget It! (3 acts) [March 18, 1993]
20. Little Red Riding Hood (2 acts) [March 19, 1993]
21. Chicken Pox (3 acts) [March 22, 1993]
22. The Guys (3 acts) [March 23, 1993]
23. Get Up & Dance [March 24, 1993]
24. Trading Bases (4 acts) [March 25, 1993]
25. When You Grow Up (3 acts) [March 26, 1993]
26. Lamb Chop's Cold [March 29, 1993]
27. Musical Chopsticks (3 acts) [March 30, 1993]
28. Principal Swanson (3 acts) [March 31, 1993]
29. Gold Diggers (3 acts) [April 1, 1993]
30. The Emperor's New Clothes [April 2, 1993]
31. Peer Pressure (3 acts) [April 5, 1993]
32. Toulouse La Chop (3 acts) [April 6, 1993]
33. Anchor Desk (3 acts) [April 7, 1993]
34. The Dark (3 acts) [April 8, 1993]
35. Lamb Chop's Lullaby [April 9, 1993]

=== Season 3 (1994) ===
1. The Horse of a Different Color (2 acts) [January 31, 1994]
2. Monopoly (3 acts) [February 1, 1994]
3. Tattletale! (3 acts) [February 2, 1994]
4. So Mad! (3 acts) [February 3, 1994]
5. Lamb Chop's Pet (3 acts) [February 4, 1994]
6. Togetherless (3 acts) [February 7, 1994]
7. What A Mess (3 acts) [February 8, 1994]
8. Buster and Butch the Bully [February 9, 1994]
9. Busted-Up Buster (3 acts) [February 10, 1994]
10. Lamb Chop Practicing Violin [February 11, 1994]

=== Season 4 (1995) ===
1. Charlie Horse Tells a Lie (3 acts) [September 11, 1995]
2. Shari's Favorite? (3 acts) [September 12, 1995]
3. Lamb Chop's Art Embarrasses Charlie Horse (3 acts) [September 13, 1995]
4. A Yo-Yo for Hush Puppy (3 acts) [September 14, 1995]
5. Lamb Chop's Glasses (3 acts) [September 15, 1995]
6. Counting on Your Knuckles [September 18, 1995]
7. Your Mitt or Mine (3 acts) [September 19, 1995]
8. Fighting Fair (3 acts) [September 20, 1995]
9. The Job (3 acts) [September 21, 1995]
10. Sea Creatures (3 acts) [September 22, 1995]

== Specials ==
2 one-hour episode specials were produced:

- Special: Lamb Chop's Special Chanukah [December 17, 1995]
- Special: Shari's Passover Surprise [April 14, 1996]

== Segments ==
=== Introduced in Season 1 ===
- At Home with Lamb Chop
- Comedy Barn
- Knock! Knock!
- A Baby Lamb Chop Story
- Betcha
- Riddles
- Funny Little Poem
- Animals from the San Diego Zoo
- Tongue Twisters
- Story Time
- Sing a Little Sing-Along Song
- Playtime With Emma
- More Playtime With Emma
- A Whale Of A Tale

=== Introduced in Season 2 ===
- Buster the Bus
- Alpha-Toons
- Something Unusual/Fascinating
- A Baby Shari Lewis Story
- A Teddy Bear Tale
- A Baby Hush Puppy Story
- Sing a Little Sing-Along Song

=== Introduced in Season 3 ===
- Any Kid Can Draw
- Take a Look at a Book
- Buster's Brain Busters
- Magic is the Thing for You
- You Can Do It

=== Introduced in Season 4 ===
- Clip from The Shari Lewis Show

== Critical reception ==
The show received a rating of 8.0 based on 128 votes, at TV.com, and a score of 7.8/10 at IMDb based on 407 ratings. Greensboro News & Record said of this show, "she (Lewis) made the sort of mischief that gave a vicarious thrill to millions of children watching at home".

In 2025, the documentary Shari & Lamb Chop was released by Kino Lorber.

== Awards and nominations ==
Year	Award	Recipient	Result
1992	Daytime Emmy for Outstanding Performer in a Children's Series	Shari Lewis	Won
1992	Daytime Emmy for Outstanding Achievement in Costume Design	Molly Harris Campbell	Nominated
1992	Daytime Emmy for Outstanding Children's Series	Bernard Rothman, Jon Slan, Richard Borchiver, Shari Lewis	Nominated
1992	Daytime Emmy for Outstanding Writing in a Children's Series	Bernard Rothman, Shari Lewis	Nominated
1993	Daytime Emmy for Outstanding Performer in a Children's Series	Shari Lewis	Won
1993	Daytime Emmy for Outstanding Writing in a Children's Series	Shari Lewis, Ken Steele, Bernard Rothman, Mallory Tarcher, Lan O'Kunx, Aubrey Tadman	Won
1993	Daytime Emmy for Outstanding Achievement in Lighting Direction	Carl Gibson	Nominated
1994	Daytime Emmy for Outstanding Performer in a Children's Series	Shari Lewis	Won
1994	Daytime Emmy for Outstanding Children's Series	Richard Borchiver, Shari Lewis, Bernard Rothman, Jon Slan	Nominated
1994	Daytime Emmy for Outstanding Writing in a Children's Series	Mallory Tarcher, Ken Steele, Steve Edelman, Bernard Rothman, Lan O'Kun, Shari Lewis, Aubrey Tadman, Tibby Rothman, Jeremy Tarcher, Michael Lyons, Kimberley Wells	Nominated
1995	Daytime Emmy for Outstanding Performer in a Children's Series	Shari Lewis	Won
1995	Daytime Emmy for Outstanding Pre-School Children's Series	Shari Lewis, Bernard Rothman, Jon Slan, Richard Borchiver	Nominated
1995	Daytime Emmy for Outstanding Writing in a Children's Series	Bernard Rothman, Shari Lewis, Mallory Tarcher, Ken Steele, Lan O'Kun, Aubrey Tadman	Nominated
1996	Daytime Emmy for Outstanding Performer in a Children's Series	Shari Lewis	Won
1996	Daytime Emmy Outstanding Pre-School Children's Series	Jon Slan, Richard Borchiver, Shari Lewis, Bernard Rothman	Nominated
1996	Daytime Emmy Outstanding Writing in a Children's Series	Mallory Tarcher, Shari Lewis, Aubrey Tadman, Ken Steele, Tibby Rothman, Lan O'Kun, Bernard Rothman	Nominated
