= Zoey & Me =

Children's book series

Zoey & Me is a children's book series written by Mallory Lewis, daughter of puppeteer Shari Lewis. It follows the experiences and escapades of 11-year-old Molly Miles and her new "baby sister" Zoey, an orangutan from the Los Angeles Zoo.

== Plot ==
1. There's an Orangutan in My Bathtub
  Zoey came to live with the Mileses shortly after she was born. Zoey's mother, a captive-bred orangutan named Lucky, didn't know how to care for her new baby, having never seen it done in the wild. As a result, little Zoey had to be placed in the care of Mrs. Miles, a primatologist at the zoo, and the only character with the time and patience to be Zoey's foster parent. Molly tries her hardest to get used to the new family member, even making Zoey her current-events project for school, but after having her homework destroyed and her mother's time taken up by the baby orangutan she gives up and begins desperately wanting things to be normal again. After Zoey ingests a bottle of shampoo and has to be rushed to the hospital, Molly learns what it truly means to be a big sister and to care about Zoey, no matter how much trouble she causes.

== Characters ==
=== Miles Family ===
Molly Miles: Molly is the preteen daughter of Mr. and Mrs. Miles. Like everybody else in her family, she has red or auburn hair and freckles. She is a big fan of Star Wars, Clint Eastwood, and movies in general. She has a best friend, Tyler, on whom she develops a crush as she got older, though he is unaware of her feelings. Molly is the one who has probably warmed the most towards Zoey, aside from her mom, and is trying to be the best big sister to her.

Mrs. Miles: Molly's mom and a primatologist at the LA Zoo. She was the one who helped Lucky give birth to Zoey at the zoo and later, became the one who had to care for Zoey as her 24\7 mom. She frequently gets annoyed with Molly's activities with Zoey, especially the one at school, but she still loves her daughter more than anything.

Mr. Miles: Molly's dad who works as a pediatrician. He's a kind man who tries to stick to his word, but usually he has to break it when he gets a sudden call from the hospital.

Brad Miles: Molly's 14-year-old brother. Brad is crazy about baseball and hopes to play as a career one day. He enjoys taunting Molly about her resemblance to Zoey, continually pointing out that they both have red hair. However, there are signs that he's starting to think more maturely after having a meaningful talk with his sister about how he felt when she was a baby, but he has much more to learn.

Zoey (Miles?): A baby orangutan who was brought into the Miles' family after being rejected by her mother. Zoey is very playful and curious, which is the biggest reason she gets into tight, and sometimes near fatal, situations. Having an aggravating tendency to rip things apart (mainly Molly's homework), throw food around, and trash anything she comes across, she has to be carefully monitored as if she were a human toddler. She once swallowed an entire bottle of shampoo and became seriously dehydrated, which caused Molly to rush her to a hospital in order to keep her from dying. This act has probably led to Zoey bonding strongly with Molly and learning the most from her.

=== Other characters ===
Tyler Matthews: Molly's best friend whom she grew up with and, on top of everything else, lives next door to. He's got blond hair, blue eyes, and he wears glasses. Many of the girls at Molly's school have a crush on him, and even Molly herself after she turned 12, but not as strong as Margie Lussman who hates seeing him with Molly. Tyler hates it when Molly comes up with plans involving Zoey since they all usually end with him getting punished along with Molly, but despite this he's still a major help in most of them.

Margie Lussman: A spoiled, stuck-up, brat of a girl who's in Molly and Tyler's homeroom. Margie's favorite pastime, by far, is teasing Molly about her being Tyler's friend and not his girlfriend (this is due in part to Margie's huge crush on Tyler). She's become even more unpleasant since Zoey came to school and succeeded in scaring her. Margie may never turn from her behavior but she still adds much humor to the series.

Mrs. Hurwitz: Molly and Tyler's homeroom teacher. She took quite a liking to Zoey when she was brought in (at least more than she liked Margie's stupid Russian coat) though this didn't keep her from doing the "teacherly" thing of tattling about it to the principle. All in all, she's an okay teacher.

Lolita Devita: The cruel director of the Northern Ohio Zoo, to which Zoey was going to be exchanged as part of a species preservation program. Lolita owns many outfits made from pelts, has a strong dislike for all animals, and had allowed the NO Zoo to fall into disrepair during her time as director. She and Mr. Sweetbreads had been secretly selling the zoo's endangered species to traveling animal shows (the press reported that the animals 'mysteriously died') and were planning to do the same with Zoey, until Molly and Sloane exposed them for the villains they were.

Hugh Sweetbreads: The assistant director at the NO Zoo, and Lolita's partner in crime. Along with helping her sell endangered species to animal shows, it is implied that he caused the Sky Safari ride Molly and Sloane were on to stop dangerously in midair (shortly after he had caught Molly snooping in his office). He and Ms. Devita were arrested thanks to the two girls.

== Books in the series ==
There are a total of four books in the Zoey & Me series. They are:

1. There's an Orangutan in My Bathtub (1997)
2. Who Gave My Orangutan a Paintbrush? (1997)
3. Keep Your Hands Off My Orangutan! (1997)
4. Stop That Orangutan! (1998)
