= Mallory Lewis =

American writer and puppeteer (born 1962)

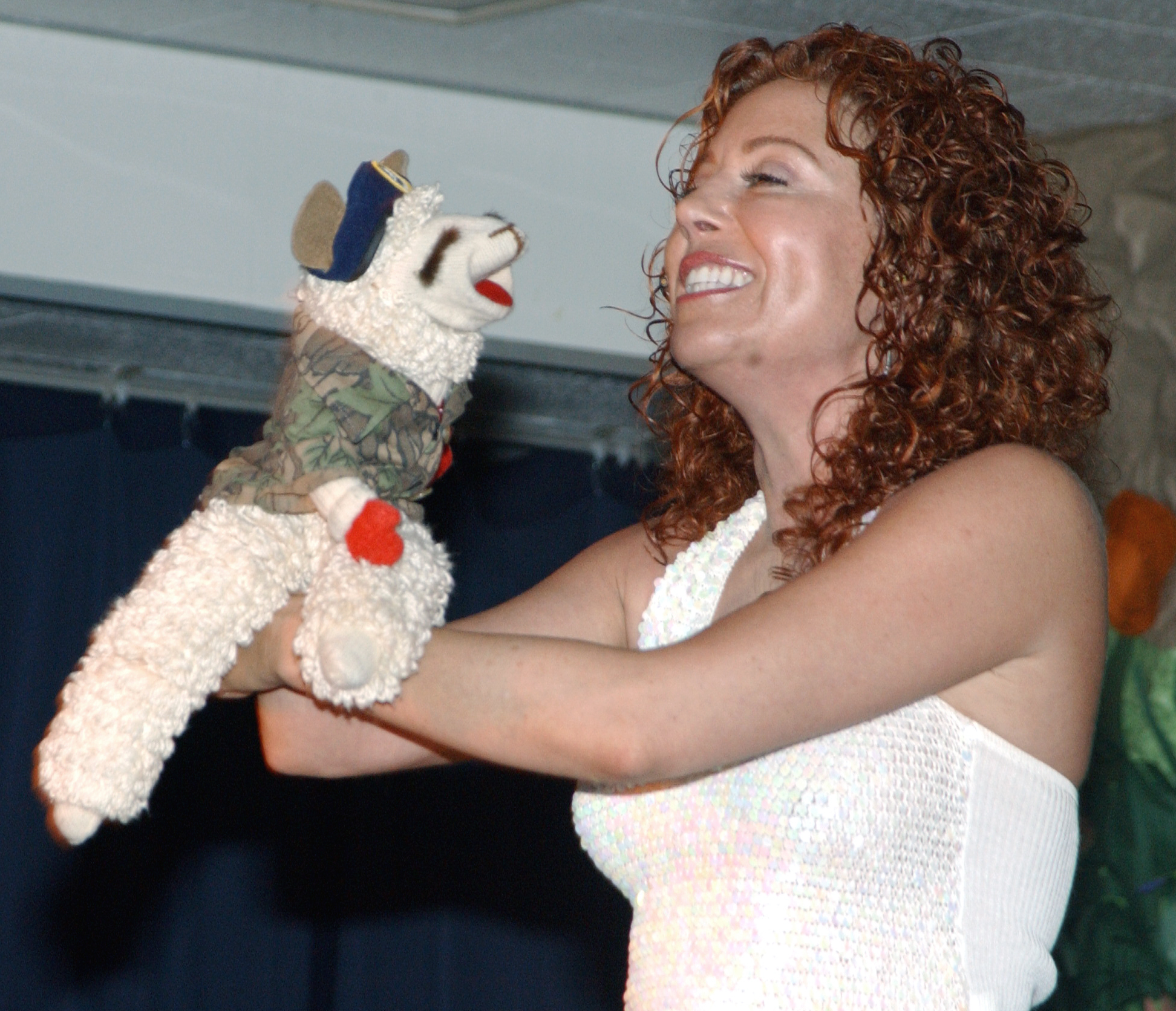
- Lewis with Lamb Chop at Kadena Air Base in 2004
- Born: Mallory Hurwitz Tarcher; July 8, 1962 (age 64); New York City, U.S.
- Other names: Mally Lewis; Mally Tarcher
- Occupations: Writer; television producer; ventriloquist; puppeteer; creator
- Years active: 1991–present
- Spouses: Brad Hood (divorced); Brian Cummings (m. 2018)
- Children: 1
- Parents: Jeremy Tarcher (father); Shari Lewis (mother)
- Relatives: Judith Krantz (paternal aunt)
- Website: mallorylewisandlambchop.com

Mallory Hurwitz Lewis (née Tarcher; born July 8, 1962) is an American writer, television producer, ventriloquist, and puppeteer. She currently puppeteers Lamb Chop, a sock puppet created by her mother, the ventriloquist Shari Lewis.

== Early life ==
Mallory Lewis was born as Mallory Tarcher in New York City into a Jewish family. She is the daughter of Jeremy Tarcher (1932–2015) and Shari Lewis (1933–1998), creator of Lamb Chop. Growing up, Lewis used to sleep with Lamb Chop.

== Career ==
Lewis worked closely with her mother as producer of Lamb Chop's Play-Along and The Charlie Horse Music Pizza. Jeremy Tarcher had also been part of Shari Lewis's shows on PBS. After her mother's death in 1998, on the advice of family and family friend Dom DeLuise, Tarcher decided that Lamb Chop should live on for her many fans.

In 2000, she started performing with Lamb Chop. During this time, she changed her surname to Lewis, as an homage to her mother. Although Lamb Chop may be described as "sassy", "please" and "thank you" are part of the repertoire. Lewis has the same hand size as her mother.

Lewis said of her decision to take up the puppet: "My mom was one of the world's greatest entertainers. I don't want to challenge that. I don't think it's wise to go there. But I do want to do everything that I can do for Lamb Chop. I'll help keep her going". Lewis had never attempted to imitate Lamb Chop's voice but upon receiving a posthumous award for Shari, Lewis performed with the puppet, discovering that she had her mother's ability to effect the voice without lip movement.

Lewis is also a writer of children's books, some of which star Zoey, a baby orangutan character she also puppeteers.

Lewis performs extensively for military support organizations such as the USO and the Fisher House Foundation, performing arts centers, and at state fairs around the country. In 2002, Lewis helped raise $275,000 for UCLA's Neuro-Oncology Program, as well as being a founder of Jump For The Cause, a women's world record skydiving organization that has raised nearly $2 million for Breast Cancer Research. Lewis is also on the board of the Blue Ribbon.

Prior to her death, Shari Lewis sold most of the rights pertaining to Lamb Chop to Golden Books Family Entertainment; a series of transactions resulted in these rights being held by Classic Media (now DreamWorks Classics, part of NBCUniversal), though Mallory still owns the live performing rights to Lamb Chop. Lewis wishes one day to put Lamb Chop back on television.

Just as Lamb Chop was passed down from mother to daughter, its legacy now continues with Lewis' son, James Abraham Tarcher Hood. James often accompanies his mother as her road manager, handling behind-the-scenes tasks such as setting up sound equipment and managing merchandise sales. He is also the only person, aside from Shari and Mallory, to have ever brought Lamb Chop to life. "She is so real in his life, as she was in mine," Lewis said.

Lewis helps narrate the 2023 documentary about her mother Shari & Lamb Chop.

== Awards ==
Mallory Lewis has won an Emmy Award for Outstanding Writing in a Children's Series and has been nominated several times. She and her mother shared an Emmy Award.
