= Lamb Chop's Sing-Along, Play-Along =

Studio album by Shari Lewis
- Released: September 22, 1992
- Recorded: 1988, Kadockadee Music Studios
- Genre: Children's music, pop
- Length: 34:38
- Label: A&M Records, Shari Lewis Enterprises, Inc.
- Producer: Glenn Jordan

Lamb Chop's Sing-Along, Play-Along is an album by Shari Lewis released on September 22, 1992. It was released on home video in 1988 by Fries Home Video. Songs were written by Norman Martin copyright ©1988 and produced by Glenn Jordan. All songs were published by Norman Martin Music (BMI) except "The Soft and Loud Song" and "Haunted House" which are published by Norman Martin Music (BMI)/Kadockadee Music (ASCAP). The children's choir director was Ann Pittel.

== Songs ==
All tracks are written by Shari Lewis, Norman Martin, Glenn Jordan.

Original release
No.	Title	Length
1.	"Sing A Little Sing-A-Long Song (Old Mac Donald)"	2:50
2.	"The Song That Doesn't End"	2:25
3.	"The If You Like Song"	2:49
4.	"Big Old Cat"	2:11
5.	"The Turning Song"	3:05
6.	"Haunted House"	3:10
7.	"Sing A Little Christmas Sing-A-Long Song (Jingle Bells)"	1:17
8.	"This Little Song"	2:37
9.	"The Soft & Loud Song"	2:27
10.	"One Plus One"	2:32
11.	"The Body Song"	3:40
12.	"Get Up And Dance"	3:28
13.	"Sing A Little Sing-A-Long Song (London Bridge, Eensie Weensie Spider, Ring-A-Round The Rosie, Shari Had A Little Lamb)"	1:48

== Credits ==
- Co-producers: Norman Martin and Shari Lewis
- Original Songs: Norman Martin
- Creative Consultant: Rick Hauser
- Music Produced & Arranged by: Glenn Jordan
- Production Facility: Tim & Jean Johnson CSI Video Center
- Director Of Photography: Lloyd Freidus
- Line Producer: Ralph Davis
- Master Puppeteer: Pat Brymer
- Assistant To Pat Brymer: Lauren Lavien
- Production Associate: Amy Von Ronnebeck
- Prop Master: Todd Tillson
- Production Assistants: Mitch Glanzbergh and Suzanne Weisberg
- Still Photography: Paul Drinkwater
- Assistant To Shari Lewis: Holly Claman
- Wardrobe Mistress: Georgia Anderson
- Children's Movement Coordinator: Bonnie Martin
- Cast: Shari Lewis, Aaron Brownstein, Hannah Hauser, Noah Hauser, Christopher Hooks, Michelle Lee, Chloe Martin, Joshua Martin
- Children's Costumes Provided by: Esprit, Inc.
- Gifts From Lamb Chop's Friends by: Dayton-Hudson Department Stores
- Electrician: John Luker II
- Camera: Bruce Burnside
- Music Engineered by: Larold Rebhun
- Sound: Don Skinner
- Production Assistants: Christine Allen, Bruce Infante, Kathy Quill
- Grips: Vern Nobles Jr., Rick Kelly, Jean Johnson, Brett Drouet
- Computer Animation: E.P. Graphics
- Editing: John Smith, C&C Visual and Gary Brasher, California Video Center
- Vidifont Operator: Nancy Fenton
- Greens & Flowers: Bob Garren
- Special Thanks To: The Porteus Family
- © 1988 Shari Lewis Enterprises, Inc.
- Norman Martin Enterprises, Inc.
- Fries Home Video
- A Subsidiary Of Fries Entertainment, Inc.
