= Shari & Lamb Chop =

- Directed by: Lisa D'Apolito
- Written by: Lisa D'Apolito; Cassidy Hartmann; Andrea Lewis
- Produced by: Cassidy Hartmann; Nicholas Ferrall; Morris Ruskin; Douglas Warner; Lisa D'Apolito
- Starring: Shari Lewis
- Edited by: Andrea Lewis
- Music by: Miriam Cutler
- Production companies: White Horse Pictures; MoJo Global Arts; Concord Originals; Olive Hill Media; The 51 Fund; The Chicago Media Project
- Distributed by: Kino Lorber
- Release dates: November 2023 (DOC NYC); July 18, 2025
- Running time: 92 minutes
- Country: United States
- Language: English
- Box office: $30,491

Shari & Lamb Chop is a 2023 documentary film about Shari Lewis. It was directed by Lisa D'Apolito.

== Production ==
The film is directed by Emmy Award nominated director Lisa D'Apolito and was produced with the cooperation of the Shari Lewis estate, through her daughter Mallory Lewis.

== Release ==
Shari & Lamb Chop was released by Kino Lorber theatrically beginning on July 18, 2025, in limited markets and became available through video-on-demand on September 2, 2025.
