= Shari Lewis =

American ventriloquist and puppeteer (1933–1998)

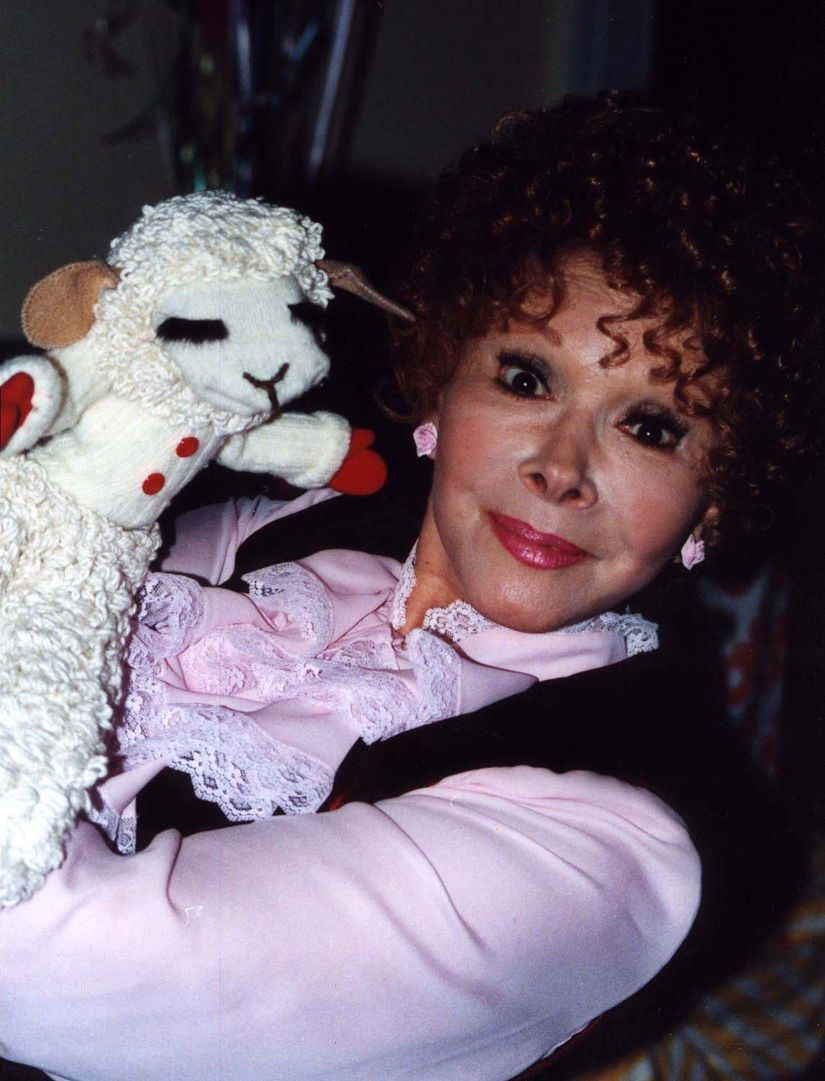
- Lewis with Lamb Chop in November 1993
- Born: Phyllis Naomi Hurwitz; January 17, 1933; New York City, U.S.
- Died: August 2, 1998 (aged 65); Los Angeles, California, U.S.
- Occupations: Ventriloquist; puppeteer; author; children's television show host; singer
- Years active: 1952–1998
- Spouses: Stan Lewis (m. 1953; div. 1957) Jeremy Tarcher (m. 1958)
- Children: Mallory Tarcher

Shari Lewis (born Phyllis Naomi Hurwitz; January 17, 1933 – August 2, 1998) was a Peabody-winning American ventriloquist, puppeteer, children's entertainer, television show host, dancer, comedian, singer, actress, author, and symphony conductor. She created and performed the sock puppet Lamb Chop for Captain Kangaroo in March 1956.

== Early life ==
Lewis was born in New York City to Jewish parents, Ann (née Ritz) and Abraham Hurwitz, an education professor at Yeshiva University originally from Vilnius, Lithuania. She had one sister, Barbara. Her father was called New York's "official magician" by Mayor Fiorello H. La Guardia during the Great Depression. Hurwitz taught his daughter to perform specialized magic acts by the time she was 13 years old. Lewis also received instruction in acrobatics, baton twirling, juggling, ice skating, and musical instruments such as piano and violin.

== Career ==
In 1952, Lewis and her puppetry won first prize on the CBS television series Arthur Godfrey's Talent Scouts. She hosted several New York-produced children's series through the decade. On July 5, 1953, Lewis made her television hosting debut on Facts N' Fun on NBC-owned WRCA-TV. The program was a variety show in which she engaged her viewers and studio audience members in games, hobbies, craft-making, songs, stories, informational segments, interviews with special guest performers and personalities. She also performed comedy skits with two ventriloquist's dummies, Samson and Taffy Twinkle. The one-hour show remained on the air until September 26, 1953.

She moved to WPIX in 1953 to replace Ted Steele as host of Kartoon Klub, which featured a variety format with a live studio audience. Lewis performed with Randy Rocket and Taffy Twinkle, and the program also featured reruns of Crusader Rabbit cartoons. Kartoon Klub later changed its title to Shari & Her Friends on September 23, 1956, and then to Shariland a month later. Lewis won New York-area Emmy Awards for her work on Shariland and a succeeding series on WRCA-TV, Hi Mom (1957–1959), which introduced Charlie Horse, Hush Puppy, and Wing Ding. Lamb Chop, also appearing, had previously been introduced during Lewis's guest appearance on Captain Kangaroo in March 1956.

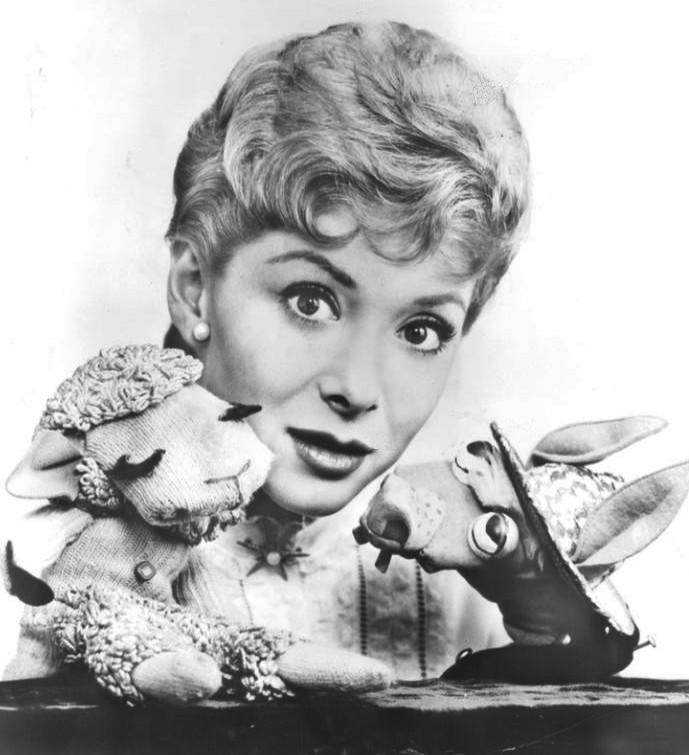
Lewis with her puppets, Lamb Chop and Charlie Horse, 1960

NBC gave Lewis her first network program, The Shari Lewis Show, which debuted on October 1, 1960, replacing The Howdy Doody Show. The show ran until September 28, 1963, and featured such characters as Hush Puppy, Charlie Horse, Lamb Chop, and Wing Ding, a black crow. Lamb Chop, which was little more than a sock with eyes, served as a sassy alter-ego for Lewis. Hush Puppy had a Southern accent with a reserved, shy and goofy personality, while Charlie Horse was a snarky, sarcastic character.

In 1961, she played title character Dulie Hudson in Watching Out for Dulie, a United States Steel Hour production. She occasionally guest-starred in TV shows such as Car 54, Where Are You?, The Man from U.N.C.L.E., and Love, American Style.

From the late 1960s until the early 1980s, she appeared in a number of British shows, such as the Val Doonican Show and the Royal Variety Performance. In 1975, Lewis briefly hosted another syndicated puppet show called The Shari Show. In 1992, her show Lamb Chop's Play-Along began a three-year run on PBS, created as an audience participation "anti-couch potato" show.

When Lamb Chop's Play-Along ended, Lewis and her husband Jeremy Tarcher created The Charlie Horse Music Pizza. A third of elementary schools were skipping music classes from their curriculum at the time, and Lewis and Tarcher felt they could introduce children to music through the show.

The faith-based video Lamb Chop's Special Chanukah was released in 1996 and received the Parents' Choice Award of the year. Lewis and Lamb Chop both appeared in a commercial for the cable TV business PrimeStar in 1997. When Lewis appeared before Congress in 1993 to testify in favor of protections for children's television, Lamb Chop gained permission to speak. As an accomplished musician, Lewis conducted major symphonies in the United States, Japan, and Canada. She wrote many books and produced 17 home videos.

Lewis's other work included providing the voice of Princess Nida in the animated segment Arabian Knights, part of the 1968 series The Banana Splits Adventure Hour. Her other voice work in animation includes Famous Studios' Honey Halfwitch theatrical cartoon shorts. Lewis voices the titular character as well as her Cousin Maggie.

With Tarcher, she co-wrote an episode for the original series of Star Trek, "The Lights of Zetar" (1969). Lewis wrote over 60 books for children.

== Personal life ==
Lewis kept her surname from her first marriage to Stan Lewis (1932–1968), a television business executive. They were high school sweethearts, married in 1953, and divorced in 1957 to protect her public reputation and career when Stan was implicated in the 1950s quiz show scandals.

Her second husband was publisher Jeremy Tarcher (1932–2015), a brother of novelist Judith Krantz. Lewis met Tarcher on the set of a radio show; they married a year later. They had a daughter, Mallory Tarcher, who wrote for two TV shows: Lamb Chop's Play-Along and its spin-off The Charlie Horse Music Pizza. Mallory legally changed her last name to Lewis and took over her mother's work with Lamb Chop in 2000, two years after Shari's death.

Prior to her death, Shari Lewis sold the rights to Lamb Chop to Golden Books Family Entertainment. When Golden filed for bankruptcy, these rights were transferred to Classic Media, which was later acquired by DreamWorks Animation (now part of NBCUniversal). Mallory Lewis still owns the live-performing rights to the Lamb Chop character.

On September 20, 2015, Jeremy Tarcher died from Parkinson's disease; he was 83.

== Illness and death ==
Lewis was treated for breast cancer in 1984. In June 1998, she was diagnosed with uterine cancer. She had a hysterectomy, but her doctors informed her that the cancer was inoperable and she was given six weeks to live. After her diagnosis, Lewis insisted on taping a final episode of The Charlie Horse Music Pizza. After recovering from the hysterectomy, she began chemotherapy at Cedars-Sinai Hospital. While undergoing chemotherapy, she developed viral pneumonia and died on the evening of August 2, 1998, at the age of 65. After her death, The Charlie Horse Music Pizza was canceled. A private funeral was held, and a public memorial was planned. The last episode of The Charlie Horse Music Pizza aired on January 17, 1999, on what would have been her 66th birthday.

A posthumous documentary film on Lewis' life and career, Shari & Lamb Chop, directed by Lisa D'Apolito, was released theatrically and on home video in 2025.

== Awards and honors ==
Lewis was the recipient of numerous awards during her lifetime, including:

- 12 Emmy Awards
- Peabody Award (1960)
- Monte Carlo Prize for the World's Best Television Variety Show (1963)
- John F. Kennedy Center Award for Excellence and Creativity (1983)
- 7 Parents' Choice Awards
- Action for Children's Television Award
- 1995 American Academy of Children's Entertainment award for Entertainer of the Year
- Dor L'Dor award of the B'nai B'rith (1996)
- 3 Houston Film Festival awards
- Silver Circle Award of the National Academy of Television Arts and Sciences (1996)
- Film Advisory Board Award of Excellence (1996)
- 2 Charleston Film Festival Gold Awards (1995)
- Houston World Festival silver and bronze awards (1995)
- New York Film and Video Festival Silver Award (1995)
- In 1979, the Supersisters trading card set was produced and distributed; one of the cards featured Lewis's name and picture.
- In 1993, Lewis received an honorary degree from Hofstra University, in Hempstead, New York.
- In 1998, she was posthumously awarded the Women in Film Lucy Award in recognition of her excellence and innovation in her creative works which have enhanced the perception of women through the medium of television.

== Television shows ==
- Shariland (1956–1958)
- Captain Kangaroo (1956)
- Hi Mom (1957–1959)
- The Merv Griffin Show – two episodes (1962 and 1967)
- The Shari Lewis Show ((NBC) 1960–1963 and (BBC) 1969–1976)
- Car 54, Where Are You? – "How High Is Up?", "Stop Thief" (voice only), "Puncher & Judy" (1962-63)
- The Danny Kaye Show – two episodes (1964)
- The Dean Martin Show – two episodes (1965–66)
- Arabian Knights – voice of Princess Nida of El-Rabaul (1968–69)
- Playboy After Dark - (01/20/1969)
- Star Trek: The Original Series – writer, "The Lights of Zetar" (1969)
- Shari's Show – TV mini-series (1970)
- What's My Line? – Mystery Guest w/Neville the Devil (1975)
- The Shari Show (syndicated) (1975–76)
- Dinah! – two episodes (1975–76)
- Lamb Chop's Play-Along (1992–1997)
- Storytime - Possum Come A-Knockin' (1993)
- Biography – Shari Lewis and Lamb Chop (1994)
- Where in the World Is Carmen Sandiego? – The Hot Ice Heist (1994)
- The Nanny – Lamb Chop's On the Menu (1995)
- Sesame Street – herself, #3525 (05/17/1996)
- The Charlie Horse Music Pizza (1998–99)

== Feature films ==
- You Can Do It! – 1984
- Have I Got a Story for You – 1984
- Kooky Classics – 1984

Archival footage of Lewis is featured in the 2023 documentary Shari & Lamb Chop.

== Specials (telecast and direct-to-video) ==
- Macy's Thanksgiving Day Parade – 1975
- Macy's Thanksgiving Day Parade – 1976
- Shari Lewis Magic Show – 1979
- Shari's Christmas Concert – 1981
- 101 Things For Kids To Do – 1987
- Lamb Chop's Sing-Along, Play-Along – 1988
- Don't Wake Your Mom! – 1989
- Lamb Chop in the Land of No Manners – 1989
- Macy's Thanksgiving Day Parade – 1992
- Macy's Thanksgiving Day Parade – 1993
- Lamb Chop in the Land of No Numbers – 1993
- Lamb Chop in the Haunted Studio – 1994
- Macy's Thanksgiving Day Parade –1994
- The 21st Annual Daytime Emmy Awards – 1994
- Lamb Chop's Special Chanukah – 1995
- Macy's Thanksgiving Day Parade – 1995
- Shari's Passover Surprise – 1996
- Kids for Character – 1996
- Macy's Thanksgiving Day Parade – 1996
- Macy's Thanksgiving Day Parade – 1997

=== Episodic TV appearances ===
- Lewis was included on the long list of entertainers who appeared on ABC's The Pat Boone Chevy Showroom, a variety series, which aired from 1957 to 1960. She was seen on the November 20 and December 18, 1958, episodes.
- Lewis appeared on April 14, 1960, and again on January 12, 1961, on NBC's The Ford Show, Starring Tennessee Ernie Ford.
- Lewis, Lamb Chop (dressed as Santa), and Charlie Horse sang one holiday song "Jingle Bells" on The Ed Sullivan Show (Season 15, Episode 15, airdate: Dec 24, 1961)
- Lewis guest-starred in two episodes of the NBC buddy-cop sitcom Car 54, Where Are You?, as Melinda Walsh in "How High is Up?" (1962) and as Judy Sanford in "Puncher and Judy" (1963).
- In "The Off-Broadway Affair", a season 3 episode of the NBC spy-adventure series The Man From U.N.C.L.E., Lewis guest-starred as a perky, somewhat ditzy understudy. Originally broadcast November 18, 1966.
- Lewis and Lamb Chop guest-starred in the 1993 episode Storytime and read "Possum Come A-Knockin'"
- Lewis and Charlie Horse guest-starred in the season 4 episode "The Hot Ice Heist" of Where in the World Is Carmen Sandiego? in 1994 and gave a clue to the gumshoes.
- Lewis and Lamb Chop guest-starred on Episode 2.20, "Lamb Chop's on the Menu", of the sitcom The Nanny broadcast on CBS, February 13, 1995.
- Lewis and Lamb Chop guest-starred on the 27th-season finale episode (#3525) of Sesame Street, broadcast on May 17, 1996.
- Lewis and Lamb Chop guest-starred on Episode 3.14, "Little Bo Peep", of the sitcom Cybill broadcast on CBS, January 20, 1997.

== Selected discography ==
- Hi Kids!, originally released in 1952 on Golden Records GLP 39 and reissued on CD by Golden Drive
- Gotta Have Rain/Piccolo Pete, released in 1958 on RCA Victor WBY-96 (45 RPM)
- Fun in Shariland, originally released in 1958 on RCA Victor LBY-1006 and reissued on RCA Camden CAL-1006 in 1960
- Shari in Storyland, originally released in 1962 on RCA Victor LPM/LSP-2463
- Jack and the Beanstalk and Other Stories, originally released in 1964 on RCA Camden CAL/CAS-1052 (CD reissue: CAD1-1052)
- Give Your Child a Headstart, originally released in 1968 on RCA Camden CAL/CAS-1096 (CD reissue: CAD1-1096)
- Lamb Chop in the Land of No Manners, released in 1991 on A&M Records 75021 0422
- Lamb Chop's Sing-Along, Play-Along, released in 1992 on A&M Records 31454 0007
- Don't Wake Your Mom!, released in 1992 on A&M Records 75021 0426
- Lamb Chop's Nutcracker Suite, released in 1993 on A&M Records 31454 0136
