= HBO Documentary Films =

Filmed entertainment arm of HBO

- Type: Division
- Industry: Film, cable television
- Headquarters: United States
- Key people: Nancy Abraham; Lisa Heller
- Products: Films and miniseries
- Parent: Home Box Office, Inc.
- Website: www.hbo.com/documentaries

HBO Documentary Films is an American production and distribution company and a division of the cable television network HBO that produces non-fiction feature films and miniseries.

The division releases between 10 and 15 documentaries per year for the network and provides limited theatrical distribution of certain films prior to their initial broadcast on HBO's linear television and streaming services.

== History ==
The unit's longtime chief was Sheila Nevins, who initially served as Director of Documentary Programming from 1979 to 1982; upon returning in 1986, she headed HBO's documentary unit under various executive capacities (as Vice President of Documentary Programming, as Senior [later, Executive] Vice President of Original Programming and, beginning in 2004, as President of HBO Documentary Films) and served as executive producer of most of its documentary productions until she left the network in March 2018. Under Nevins, HBO's documentaries have won 35 News and Documentary Emmy Awards, 42 Peabody Awards, and 26 Academy Awards as well as 31 individual Primetime Emmy Awards honored to Nevins. In December 2017, Nevins announced she would be stepping down from her position, with Nancy Abraham and Lisa Heller set to replace her.

The network's first successful documentary was the six-part 1979 miniseries Time Was, a Dick Cavett-hosted retrospective that took a historical look at an individual decade in the 20th century—from the 1920s up to the 1970s—over the course of each episode. 1981's She's Nobody's Baby—produced in conjunction with Ms. magazine—traced the evolution of the societal role of American women during the 20th Century; the special earned HBO its first Peabody Award, the first to be won by a pay television service and the first of many HBO documentaries to receive the prestigious award. HBO also produced a series of informational documentaries in partnership with Consumer Reports starting in 1980, detailing information on subjects encompassing product safety, personal finance and health. One such documentary, AIDS: Everything You and Your Family Need to Know..But Were Afraid to Ask, which aired in 1987 at the height of the AIDS epidemic in the U.S., was hosted by Surgeon General C. Everett Koop and provided factual information on the AIDS and HIV viruses.

In 2006, film director Spike Lee made a two-part four-hour documentary on Hurricane Katrina, When the Levees Broke: A Requiem in Four Acts. Also in 2006, documentary artist Lauren Greenfield directed Thin, a feature-length film about four young women struggling with eating disorders seeking treatment at the Renfrew Clinic in Florida. 2008 saw the American television premiere of Baghdad High, which depicted the lives of four boys attending a high school in the Iraqi capital city over the course of one year, through a video diary filmed by the documentary's principal subjects who were provided cameras to film the project.

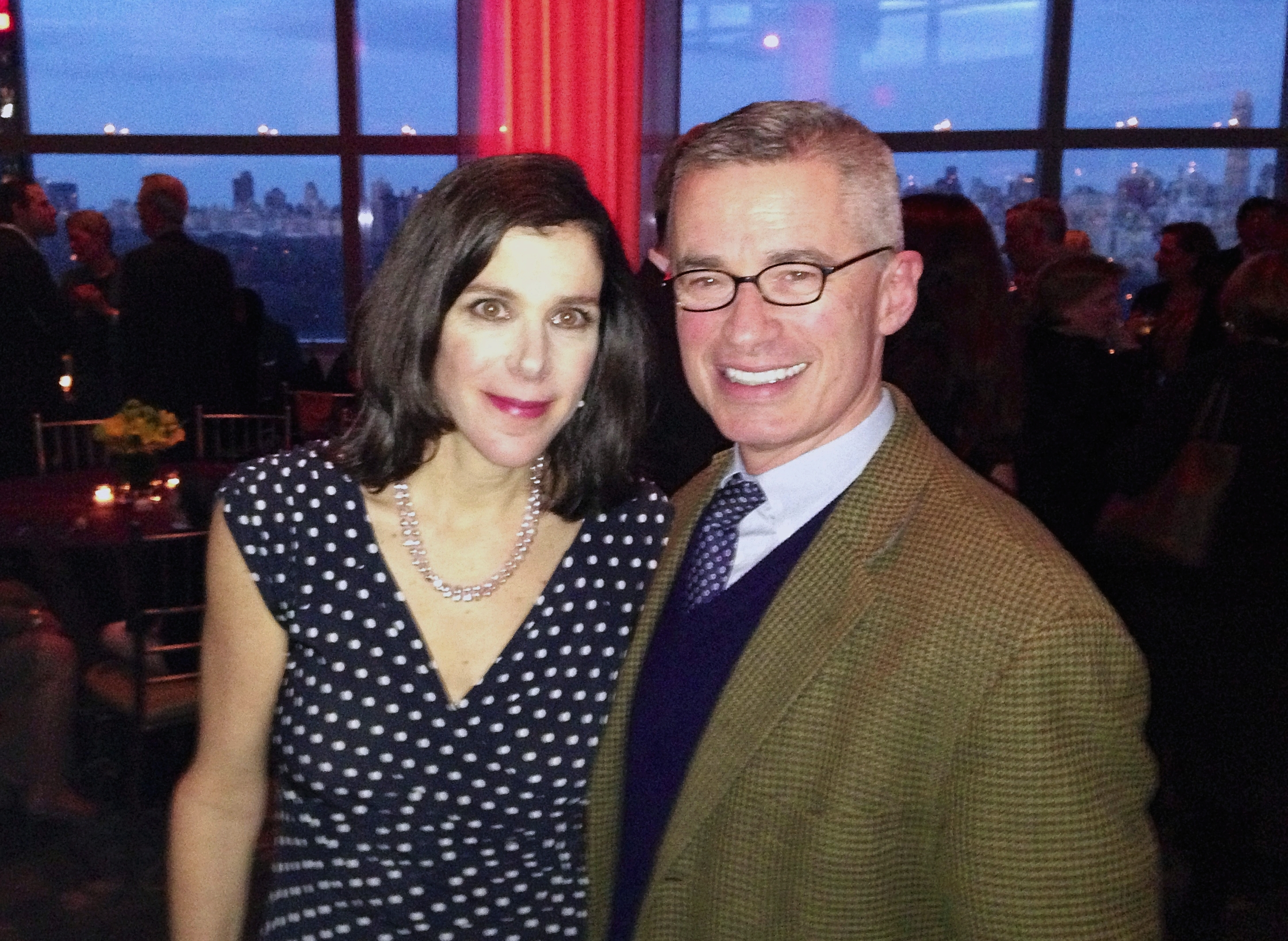
Filmmaker Alexandra Pelosi and former New Jersey governor Jim McGreevey at the New York City premiere of Pelosi's HBO documentary about McGreevey, Fall to Grace, in March 2013.

In November 2008, HBO paid low seven figures for the American television rights to the Amy Rice–Alicia Sams documentary By the People: The Election of Barack Obama. The film—which had a limited theatrical release in New York City and Los Angeles, and aired on HBO in November 2009—covered Obama's 2006 trip to Africa, his presidential primary campaign, the 2008 general election and his first Presidential inauguration. In November 2012, HBO aired the four-part documentary, Witness, which devoted each part to one of four conflict regions—Juarez, Libya, South Sudan and Rio de Janeiro—as covered by a team of photojournalists based in those regions. On March 28, 2013, the channel premiered the Alexandra Pelosi-directed Fall to Grace, about the infidelity scandal that led to the 2011 resignation of New Jersey governor Jim McGreevey and resulted in him coming out as gay. That same year, HBO produced and distributed Life According to Sam a documentary film based on the life of Sam Berns.

In February 2015, HBO premiered a six-part documentary from Andrew Jarecki, The Jinx: The Life and Deaths of Robert Durst, chronicling the mystery surrounding the New York real estate heir's alleged involvement in the unsolved 1982 disappearance of his wife, Kathie Durst; the 2000 execution-style killing of writer Susan Berman; and the 2001 death and dismemberment of Durst's neighbor, Morris Black. The miniseries gained broader exposure after Durst was arrested on first-degree murder charges in relation to Berman's death on March 14, 2015 (one day prior to the docuseries's finale). The evidence leading to his arrest included an envelope left by Berman after her murder and provided to the filmmakers for analysis by her stepson, Sareb Kaufman, with misspelled block letter handwriting matching an anonymous envelope sent to police in December 2000 to alert them to Berman's murder, and a rambling apparent confession by Durst—unaware that the microphone attached to him for his interview with Jarecki was still recording—to the murders of all three victims.

HBO has also produced recurring documentary series, among the earliest and most notable being America Undercover, a monthly one-hour series of topical documentaries covering subjects in an un-sensationalized manner. The America Undercover banner would go on to spawn two regular sub-series: Real Sex (a late night magazine-formatted series of specials that ran from 1992 to 2009, featuring frank explorations on a variety of mainstream and non-mainstream sexual matters) and Autopsy (a series of specials that aired between 1994 and 2008, in which forensic pathologist Dr. Michael Baden provides analysis on criminal, suspicious and health-related death cases). One of America Undercover's most notable specials was 1985's Soldiers in Hiding, focusing on homeless veterans of the Vietnam War living in the wilderness, which was the first Academy Award nomination for a cable television service in the Best Documentary category (although HBO has had some of its documentaries enter limited theatrical release to qualify for Oscar nominations in later years). HBO is also noted for its Sports of the 20th Century documentary brand. One of its most notable documentaries from that series was Dare to Dream, a 2005 film about the U.S. Women's Soccer Team and the roles of Mia Hamm, Kristine Lilly, Brandi Chastain, Joy Fawcett and Julie Foudy in the team's rise to prominence in sports.

Through a partnership with Vice Media, the network ran a monthly docuseries, Vice, featuring in-depth reports from host/creator/Vice magazine co-founder Shane Smith and a team of correspondents investigating political and cultural topics and using an immersionist filmmaking style. Running for six seasons from April 2013 to December 2018, the show won an Emmy Award for "Outstanding Informational Series or Special" in 2014. Vice was cancelled on February 1, 2019, as part of a broader corporate reorganization at Vice Media; a companion daily news show, Vice News Tonight, was cancelled on June 10, 2019, when HBO announced it would be terminating its seven-year partnership with the company. (The Vice docuseries moved to Showtime and Vice News Tonight moved to Vice on TV in March 2020.)

In 2020, HBO premiered The Vow, a documentary series revolving around NXIVM directed by Jehane Noujaim and Karim Amer. The series was renewed for a second and final season, which premiered in October 2022.

In 2021, HBO premiered Allen v. Farrow, a documentary series examining the allegations made by Dylan Farrow against her father Woody Allen. The first episode garnered over a million viewers, the most for an HBO documentary series since The Case Against Adnan Syed in 2019. The series went on to earn several Primetime Emmy Award nominations.

In 2022, HBO acquired television and streaming rights to All That Breathes directed by Shaunak Sen, and All the Beauty and the Bloodshed directed by Laura Poitras, both of which went on to be nominated for an Academy Award for Best Documentary Feature Film.

In 2023, HBO premiered Last Call: When a Serial Killer Stalked Queer New York directed by Anthony Caronna, and executive produced by Liz Garbus, Dan Cogan and Charlize Theron. Telemarketers directed by Adam Bhala Lough and Sam Lipman-Stern, executive produced by Josh Safdie, Benny Safdie, David Gordon Green and Danny McBride, revolving around two employees set to expose the telemarketing industry, Love Has Won: The Cult of Mother God following Amy Carlson directed by Hannah Olson, and Murder in Boston: Roots, Rampage, and Reckoning directed by Jason Hehir.

In 2024, HBO premiered the second season of The Jinx, focusing on Robert Durst trial and the aftermath following the release of the first season, Stax: Soulsville U.S.A. directed by Jamila Wignot focusing on Stax Records, Ren Faire directed by Lance Oppenheim focusing on the Texas Renaissance Festival, and Chimp Crazy directed by Eric Goode following Tonia Haddix, whose love for a chimpanzee spins into a wild game with authorities and the animal rights group PETA. The series marked HBO's most watched documentary series in several years.

That same year, HBO premiered the feature-length documentaries The Truth vs. Alex Jones, MoviePass, MovieCrash, Elizabeth Taylor: The Lost Tapes, Faye, Money Electric: The Bitcoin Mystery, and Night is Not Eternal.

== See also ==
- List of HBO Films films
- List of HBO original programming
- List of HBO Max original films
