= The Last Cruise =

2021 American documentary film

- Film poster
- Directed by: Hannah Olson
- Produced by: Hannah Olson; Shane Boris; Joe Beshenkovsky; James A. Smith
- Cinematography: Luisa Conlon
- Edited by: Joe Beshenkovsky
- Music by: Daniel Lopatin
- Production companies: HBO Documentary Films; Deep Cut; Open Secret
- Distributed by: HBO
- Release dates: March 16, 2021 (SXSW); March 30, 2021 (United States)
- Running time: 40 minutes
- Country: United States
- Language: English

The Last Cruise is a 2021 American short documentary film directed by Hannah Olson. It is about the COVID-19 outbreak on the Diamond Princess. It premiered at the 2021 SXSW Film Festival and was released on March 30, 2021, by HBO.

== Synopsis ==
The Last Cruise documents the experiences of people on board the now-infamous Diamond Princess cruise ship, where an uncontained COVID-19 outbreak at the start of the pandemic became a global spectacle and a faraway symbol of the new virus and its potential to upend any sense of normalcy.

The ship set sail from Yokohama, Japan on January 20, 2020. By February 26, the Diamond Princess accounted for more than half of all the documented COVID-19 cases outside of China with over 700 infected people aboard. Using intimate footage recorded by its passengers and crew, The Last Cruise is a first-person account of the nightmare that transpired aboard the ill-fated cruise. With little information available about the new virus and limited access to resources, the ship's cases soared. Passengers were quarantined in their staterooms for weeks and would ultimately account for the first citizens to test positive for COVID-19 in several countries around the world. Meanwhile, the crew tended to the passengers, delivered room service meals and slept and dined in cramped, shared quarters. They’d become what would later be termed "essential workers."

== Reception ==
On the review aggregator website Rotten Tomatoes, 100% of 10 critics' reviews are positive. Metacritic, which uses a weighted average, assigned the film a score of 75 out of 100, based on five critics, indicating "generally favorable" reviews.
