= Ailey (film) =

- Theatrical release poster
- Directed by: Jamila Wignot
- Produced by: Jamila Wignot; Lauren DeFilippo
- Cinematography: Naiti Gámez
- Edited by: Annukka Lilja
- Music by: Daniel Bernard Roumain
- Production companies: Insignia Films; Impact Partners; ITVS; American Masters; XTR; Black Public Media; Artemis Rising Foundation; JustFilms Ford Foundation
- Distributed by: Neon
- Release dates: January 30, 2021 (Sundance); July 23, 2021 (United States)
- Running time: 94 minutes
- Country: United States
- Language: English
- Box office: $214,328

Ailey is a 2021 American documentary film, directed by Jamila Wignot, which follows the life of dancer Alvin Ailey.

It had its world premiere at the Sundance Film Festival on January 30, 2021. It was released on July 23, 2021, by Neon.

== Synopsis ==
The film follows the life of dancer Alvin Ailey.

== Production ==
In 2017, Wignot was approached by Insignia Films to direct a documentary about Ailey after discovering American Masters had not produced a documentary film revolving around his life, and that no film biographies about Ailey existed. Production on the film began in Summer 2018, and concluded in October 2019. Wingot also incorporated audio recordings made by Ailey, for an autobiography he was collaborating on with A. Peter Bailey, feeling it was important to have the story told in his voice.

Wignot wanted to include apart from Ailey's life and career, a contemporary element to the film by filming rehearsals of Lazarus by the Alvin Ailey Dance Company to show Ailey's impact and leverage for the next generation of artists.

== Release ==
The film had its world premiere at the Sundance Film Festival on January 30, 2021. Shortly after, Neon acquired U.S. distribution rights to the film. It was released on July 23, 2021. It was broadcast on American Masters on PBS on January 11, 2022.

== Critical reception ==
Ailey received positive reviews from film critics. It holds a 90% approval rating on review aggregator website Rotten Tomatoes, based on 80 reviews, with a weighted average of 7.60/10. The critics consensus reads "Ailey pays invigorating tribute to its subject's brilliant legacy -- and offers a tantalizing introduction to the rest of a fascinating story." On Metacritic, the film holds a rating of 77 out of 100, based on 18 critics, indicating "generally favorable" reviews.

Jonita Davis of The Black Cape said the film "works to chronicle the rise off a legend while also documenting the hardships of performing in the US from the 1950s onward." Gia Kourlas of The New York Times gave the film a positive review writing: "Wignot layers images, video and - most important - voice-overs from Ailey to create a portrait that feels as poetic and nuanced as choreography itself."
