= A Stray =

- Directed by: Musa Syeed
- Written by: Musa Syeed
- Produced by: Jamila Wignot
- Starring: Barkhad Abdirahman
- Cinematography: Yoni Brook
- Edited by: Kamau Bilal; Ray Hubley
- Production company: Vilcek Foundation
- Release date: March 14, 2016 (South by Southwest)
- Running time: 82 minutes
- Country: United States
- Languages: English; Somali

A Stray is a 2016 American drama film starring Barkhad Abdirahman.

== Plot ==
A young Somali man named Adan (played by Barkhad Abdirahman) is kicked out of his home and must survive on the streets of his hometown, Minneapolis. He begrudgingly befriends a stray dog, which brings him companionship. However, it also brings Adan further exile from his family, his friends, and his community, as caring for a dog as a pet may be seen as haram for Muslims, especially in Somali culture. The film explores loneliness and belonging with intimate shots of Minneapolis seen through the eyes of a downtrodden Somali immigrant.

== Cast ==
- Barkhad Abdirahman as Adan
- Christina Baldwin
- Ifrah Mansour
- Faysal Ahmed
- Fathia Absie
- Ismael Abdullahi

== Reception ==
The film has a 100% rating on Rotten Tomatoes. Omer M. Mozaffar of RogerEbert.com awarded the film four stars. Chris Hewitt of the St. Paul Pioneer Press awarded it three and a half stars. Colin Covert of the Star Tribune gave the film three and a half stars out of four.

However, the film received a negative review from Thaddeus McCollum and Cameron Meier of Orlando Weekly; they awarded the film one and a half stars out of five.
