= Legends of Mount Shasta =

Myths about the volcano in California

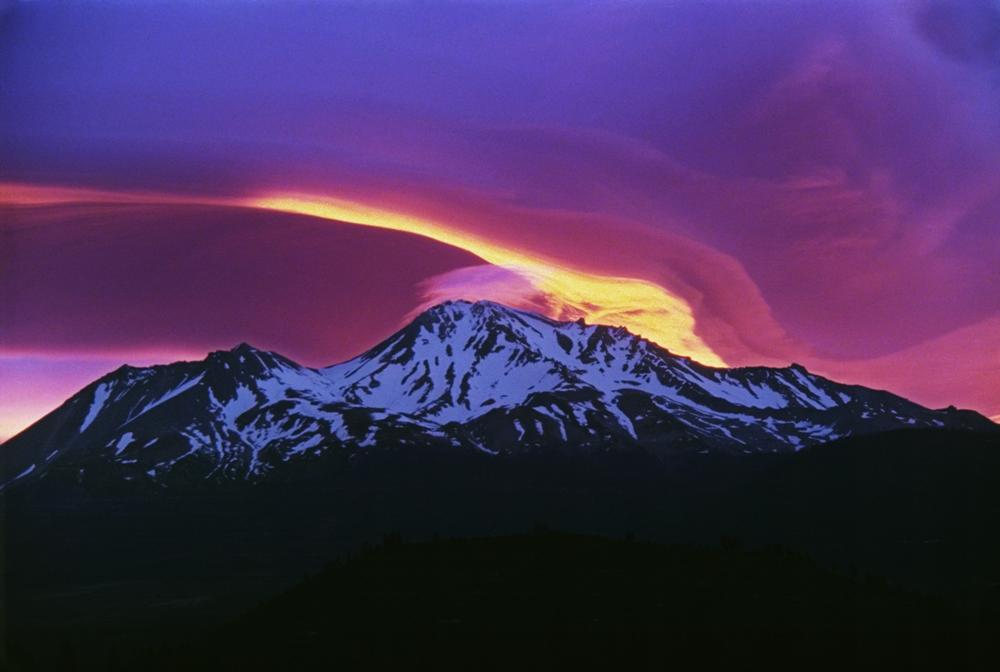
Sunrise on Mount Shasta

California's Mount Shasta has been the subject of a large number of myths and legends. In particular, it is often said there is a secret city beneath its peaks. In some stories, the city is no longer inhabited, while in others, it is inhabited by a technologically advanced society of human beings or mythical creatures.

== Klamath legend ==
According to the local Klamath people, Mount Shasta is inhabited by the spirit chief Skell, who descended from heaven to the mountain's summit. Skell fought with the Spirit of the Below-World, Llao, who resided at Mount Mazama, by throwing hot rocks and lava, probably representing the volcanic eruptions at both mountains. Writer Joaquin Miller recorded various related legends in the 1870s.

== Lemuria ==
Mount Shasta has also been a focus for non-Native American legends, centered on a hidden city (called Telos) of advanced beings from the lost continent of Lemuria. In 1905, A Dweller on Two Planets by Frederick Spencer Oliver was published, which claimed that survivors from a sunken continent called Lemuria were living in or on Mount Shasta. Oliver's Lemurians lived in a complex system of tunnels beneath with jeweled walls and fur-carpeted floors within the mountain, and occasionally were seen walking the surface dressed in white robes.

In 1931, Harvey Spencer Lewis, using the pseudonym Wishar S[penle] Cerve, wrote a book published by the Ancient Mystical Order Rosae Crucis about the hidden Lemurians of Mount Shasta that a bibliography on Mount Shasta described as "responsible for the legend's widespread popularity". This belief has been incorporated into numerous new religious movements, including "I AM" Activity, The Summit Lighthouse/Church Universal and Triumphant/Keepers Of The Flame, Love Has Won, and Kryon.

Several UFO sightings were reported in the proximity of Mount Shasta and are speculated in local legends to be lenticular clouds hiding Lemurian motherships visiting the hidden city of Telos. Bigfoot sightings at Shasta have also been reported in cryptozoology, as well as stories about interdimensional beings connected to the Ascended Masters.

== Count of St. Germain ==
According to Guy Ballard, while hiking on Mount Shasta, he encountered a man who introduced himself as Count of St. Germain, who is said to have started Ballard on the path to discovering the teachings that would become "I AM" Activity.
