= Fathia Absie =

Somali broadcaster, writer and filmmaker

- Fadxiya Cabsiiye فتحية إبسيآ
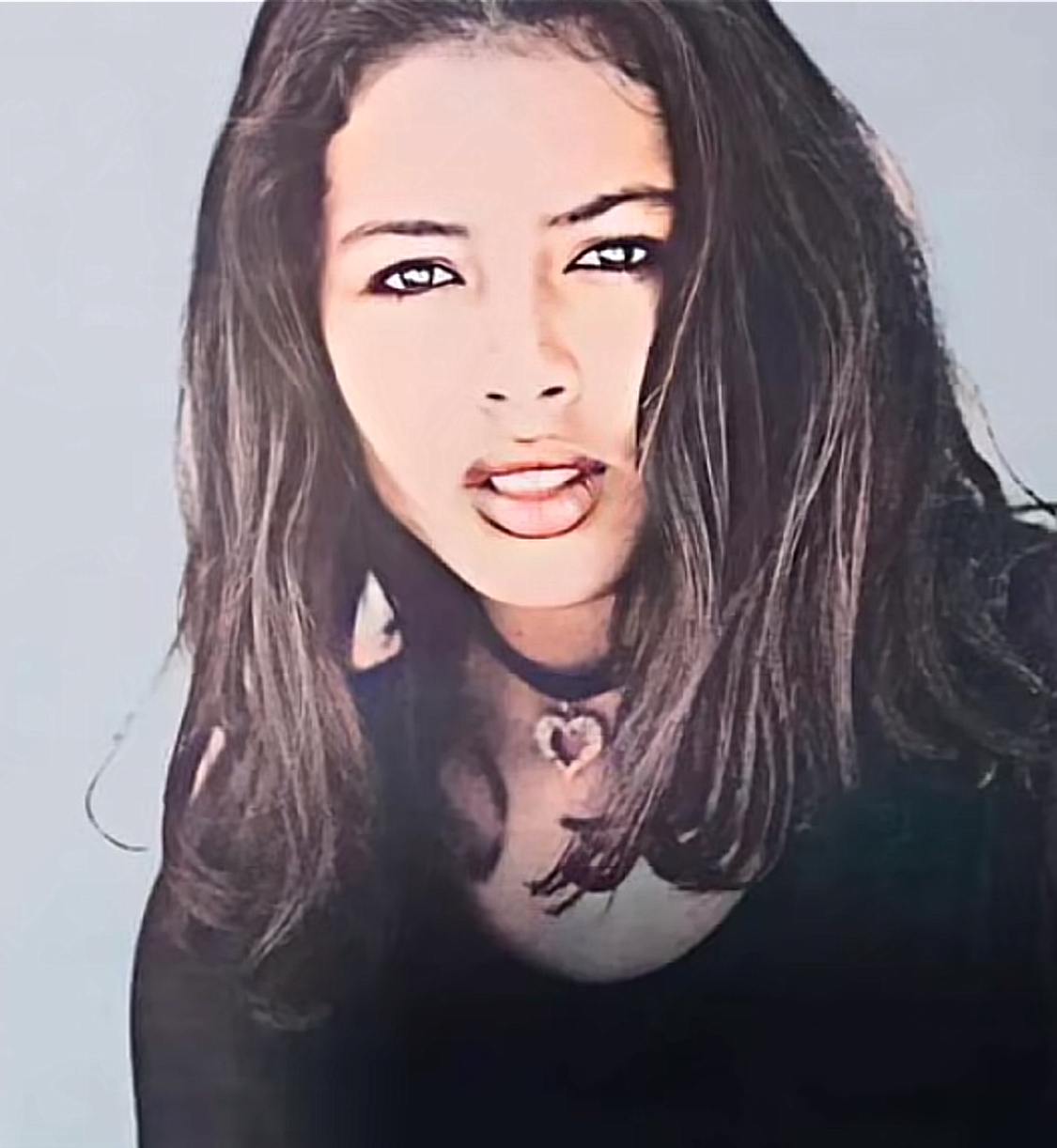
- Born: Burco, Somalia
- Citizenship: Somali American
- Occupations: Writer, Producer, Actress and a Filmmaker
- Organization: Eat With Muslims (Co-founder)
- Children: 2

Fathia Absie (Somali: Fadxiya Cabsiiye, Arabic: فتحية إبسيآ) is a Somali-American writer, producer, actress and filmmaker, born in Burco, Somalia. Her work includes documentaries, narrative films and a graphic novel. She is a co-founder of Eat With Muslims, a project that organizes dinners where Muslims and non-Muslims share meals and stories.

== Career ==
Absie moved to Minnesota around 2010 and was formerly a social worker. She has worked for a number of organizations, including the Ohio Department of Job and Family Services in Columbus, Ohio, the University of Washington in Seattle, and Voice of America in Washington D.C. Absie stars in her own film, The Lobby, about a relationship between a white man and a Somali-American woman. In 2013, she joined ECHO, a Minnesota-based non-governmental organization serving immigrant communities.

In 2011, Absie released her first documentary film, Broken Dreams, a documentary about the Somali community’s response to the recruitment of young Somali men in Minnesota. The disappearances led to an FBI investigation. In 2014, Absie published a graphic novel, The Imperceptible Peacemaker, through CreateSpace, a self-publishing service owned by Amazon. The story follows a superhero protagonist who, with a technology entrepreneur, builds a suit that makes him invisible, and it deals with themes of vigilante justice. Ms. Absie also worked with Twin Cities PBS where she hosted countless programs and the documentary, Giving Thanks! 2016 Fathia Absie was the Drama film directed by Musa Syeed · About a young Muslim refugee in Minneapolis crosses paths with a stray dog. Absie played Barkhad Abdirahman's mother. https://www.imdb.com/title/tt5447852/

In 2015, Absie released her second film, the fictional narrative The Lobby, which she starred in as well as wrote and directed. It premiered at the Minneapolis–Saint Paul International Film Festival in April of the year. This was a fictional story about the relationship between a white man and a Somali-American woman. November 2017, Absie reunites with Barkhad Abdirahman, this time playing him and Faysal Ahmed’s feisty mother at Eric Tretbar’s film, “First Person Plural” A modern-day Romeo and Juliet, starring Faysal Ahmed and Broadway great, Pearce Bunting among others. Absie begins the preproduction of a narrative called "Grapes Of Heaven" A heartbroken Somali-American woman and a writer visiting the small coastal town of Berbera, Somaliland where a famous Somali poet named Bodheri died of a broken heart in the 1930s.

== Filmography ==
- Broken Dreams (2011), documentary
- The Imperceptible Peacemaker (2014), graphic novel
- The Lobby (2015), film (writer, director, actor)
- A Stray (2016), film (actor)
- First Person Plural (2017), film (actor)

== Works ==
- The Imperceptible Peace Maker (2014)
