= Jamila Wignot =

American documentary filmmaker

- Years active: 2003–present

Jamila Wignot is an American documentary filmmaker and producer from Brooklyn, New York. Wignot has directed Ailey (2021), and co-directed Town Hall (2013) with Sierra Pettengill. In 2024, Wignot directed and produced the Peabody Award winning documentary series Stax: Soulsville U.S.A. for HBO.

== Career ==
Wignot began her career serving as a production coordinator, researcher and director on American Experience for PBS.

In 2013, Wignot co-directed with Sierra Pettengil, Town Hall, a documentary revolving around activists in the Tea Party movement for ITVS. Wignot has additionally directed episodes of Makers: Women Who Make America, Finding Your Roots, and The African Americans: Many Rivers to Cross.

In 2021, Wignot directed and produced Ailey which had its world premiere at the 2021 Sundance Film Festival and was released in July 2021, by Neon. Ailey is a documentary about choreographer Alvin Ailey, and it allows Wignot to incorporate dance into film. Art Farm at Serenbe opened their February 2026 Film Showcase Weekend by showing Ailey and hosting Wignot to discuss the filmmaking process, as well as Ailey’s legacy, with educator Nasha Thomas. In 2024, she directed and produced the documentary series Stax: Soulsville U.S.A. for HBO Documentary Films, which was nominated for an Emmy in the Outstanding Documentary or Nonfiction Series category in the 76th Emmy Awards.

She has served as a producer on A Stray directed by Musa Syeed, and Riotsville, U.S.A. directed by Sierra Pettengill.
