= Stax: Soulsville U.S.A. =

2024 American TV documentary series

- Genre: Documentary
- Directed by: Jamila Wignot
- Country of origin: United States
- Original language: English
- No. of episodes: 4

Production
- Executive producers: Ezra Edelman; Caroline Waterlow; Nigel Sinclair; Nicholas Ferrall; Scott Pascucci; Sophia Dilley; Michele Smith; Jody Gerson; David Blackman; Charlie Cohen; Ron Broitman; Nancy Abraham; Lisa Heller; Tina Nguyen
- Producers: Jamila Wignot; Kara Elverson
- Cinematography: Bryan Gentry
- Running time: 50–62 minutes
- Production companies: HBO Documentary Films; White Horse Pictures; Laylow Pictures; Concord Originals; PolyGram Entertainment; Warner Music Entertainment

Original release
- Network: HBO
- Release: May 20 – May 21, 2024

Stax: Soulsville U.S.A. is an American documentary series directed and produced by Jamila Wignot. It corrects the history of Stax Records.

The documentary had its world premiere at South by Southwest on March 10, 2024, where it won the TV Premiere Audience Award. It premiered on May 20, 2024, on HBO. The series also won a Peabody Award at the 85th Annual Ceremony.

== Premise ==
The series follows Stax Records, a record label that ushered in artists, Otis Redding, Isaac Hayes, Booker T. & the M.G.'s, The Staple Singers and Sam & Dave; The label went from being an outsider to one of the most influential producers of music, with an impact even after the label has gone.

== Episodes ==
No.	Title	Directed by	Original release date
1	"Cause I Love You"	Jamila Wignot	May 20, 2024
2	"Soul Man"	Jamila Wignot	May 20, 2024
3	"Respect Yourself"	Jamila Wignot	May 21, 2024
4	"Nothing Takes the Place of You"	Jamila Wignot	May 21, 2024

== Production ==
In May 2022, it was announced Jamila Wignot would direct and produce a documentary series revolving around Stax Records for HBO Documentary Films, with Ezra Edelman set to executive produce. Rob Bowman served as a consultant on the series.

== Reception ==
=== Critical reception ===
On the review aggregator website Rotten Tomatoes, 100% of 12 critics' reviews are positive. On Metacritic, the series holds a weighted average score of 81 out of 100, based on 5 critics, indicating "universal acclaim".

Nina Metz of Chicago Tribune gave the series three out of four stars, writing: "A story of musical genius but also racism, personal tragedies and corporate greed." John Anderson of Wall Street Journal also praised the series writing: "Stax may have been of a particular place and time, but Ms. Wignot resurrects it all gloriously, and grittily, and with the personality and precision of the M.G.s rhythm section."

=== Accolades ===
Year	Award	Category	Nominee(s)	Result	Ref.
2024	Black Reel Awards	Outstanding Documentary	Jamila Wignot	Won	
2024	Gotham TV Awards	Breakthrough Nonfiction Series	Jamila Wignot, Nancy Abraham, David Blackman, Ron Broitman, Charlie Cohen, Sophia Dilley, Ezra Edelman, Nicholas Ferrall, Jody Gerson, Lisa Heller, Tina Nguyen, Scott Pascucci, Nigel Sinclair, Michele Smith, and Caroline Waterlow	Nominated	
2024	IDA Documentary Awards	Best Limited Series	Jamila Wignot, Kara Elverson, Ezra Edelman, Caroline Waterlow, Nigel Sinclair, Nicholas Ferrall, Scott Pascucci, Sophia Dilley, Michele Smith, Jody Gerson, David Blackman, Charlie Cohen, Ron Broitman, Nancy Abraham, Lisa Heller, and Tina Nguyen	Nominated	
2024	Primetime Emmy Awards	Outstanding Documentary or Nonfiction Series	Jamila Wignot, Kara Elverson, Ezra Edelman, Caroline Waterlow, Nigel Sinclair, Nicholas Ferrall, Michele Smith, Sophia Dilley, David Blackman, and Tina Nguyen	Nominated	
2024	Primetime Emmy Awards	Outstanding Sound Mixing for a Nonfiction Program	Tony Volante and Andre Artis (for "Chapter Two: Soul Man")	Nominated	
2024	South by Southwest Film & TV Festival (SXSW)	TV Premiere Audience Award	Jamila Wignot and Kara Elverson	Won	
2025	Cinema Audio Society Awards	Outstanding Achievement in Sound Mixing for Non-Theatrical Motion Pictures or Limited Series	Tony Volante and Andre Artis (for "Soul Man")	Nominated	
2025	Peabody Awards	Documentary	HBO Documentary Films presents in association with Concord Originals, PolyGram Entertainment, Warner Music Entertainment; A Laylow Pictures production; A White Horse Pictures production	Won	
