= Hollywoodgate =

2023 German-American documentary film

- Film poster
- Directed by: Ibrahim Nash'at
- Written by: Ibrahim Nash'at; Talal Derki; Shane Boris
- Produced by: Talal Derki; Odessa Rae; Shane Boris
- Cinematography: Ibrahim Nash'at
- Edited by: Atanas Georgiev; Marion Tuor
- Music by: Volker Bertelmann
- Production companies: Rolling Narratives; Jouzour Film Production; Cottage M; Raefilm Studios
- Distributed by: Fourth Act Film
- Release dates: August 31, 2023 (Venice); July 19, 2024 (United States)
- Running time: 92 minutes
- Countries: Germany; United States
- Languages: English; Dari; Pashto

Hollywoodgate is a 2023 documentary film written and directed by Ibrahim Nash'at. It premiered out of competition at the 80th Venice International Film Festival. It was released in the United States on July 19, 2024.

== Production ==
The film was shot over the course of a year, and it chronicles the daily life in Afghanistan of Taliban air force commander Mawlawi Mansour, and one of his soldiers, the fundamentalist M.J. Mukhtar, following the American withdrawal from Afghanistan.

== Release ==
The film premiered out of competition at the 80th Venice International Film Festival. It was later screened at the 2023 Telluride Film Festival, the 2023 Tallinn Black Nights Film Festival, the 2023 International Documentary Film Festival Amsterdam, the 2024 Jeonju International Film Festival, the 2024 Seattle International Film Festival, the 2024 Sheffield International Documentary Festival, the 2024 DOK.fest München, the 2024 CPH: DOX, the 2024 Antenna documentary film festival, the 48th Hong Kong International Film Festival, the 2024 Doc Fortnight, the 2024 Thessaloniki Documentary Festival, the 2024 Doc Point and premiered in the 2024 New Zealand International Film Festival and the 2024 ZagrebDox International Documentary Film Festival.

The film was released in the United States on July 19, 2024. It was released in the regions of Middle East and North Africa (MENA) from August 30, 2024 where the Dubai-based distributor Front Row Filmed Entertainment acquired distribution rights.

== Reception ==
On the review aggregator website Rotten Tomatoes, 91% of 32 critics' reviews are positive, with an average rating of 7.4/10. The website's consensus reads: "An exposé on the Taliban that can only show what documentarian Ibrahim Nash'at was allowed, Hollywoodgate provides an incomplete but vital glimpse into Afghanistan's new status quo." Metacritic, which uses a weighted average, assigned the film a score of 74 out of 100, based on 13 critics, indicating "generally favorable" reviews.

Reviewing the film for The Observer, Wendy Ide called it a "fascinating, chilling film", awarding it four stars out of five. The Guardian's Xan Brooks also gave it four out of five stars, saying that the director's "careful approach pays handsome dividends."

=== Accolades ===
The film was named as the winners of "The Golden Eye" from the 2023 Zurich Film Festival, the "Full Frame Grand Jury Award" from the 2024 Full Frame Documentary Film Festival, the "AFF Feature Documentary Award" from the 2023 Adelaide Film Festival, "The Fipresci Prize" from the 2023 El Gouna Film Festival, and also received the top honors of El Gouna Gold Star for Documentary Film, the "Best Human Rights Film" from the 2023 Verzio International Human Rights Documentary Film Festival.
