= Love Has Won =

American new religious movement

- Logo of Love Has Won
- Abbreviation: LHW
- Type: New religious movement
- Theology: New Age
- Governance: Founder-leader
- Leader: Amy Carlson ("Mother God")
- Leader: Jason Castillo ("Father God")
- Region: Colorado, Hawaii, and California (temporarily, 2020–21)
- Language: English
- Headquarters: Crestone, Colorado
- Founder: Amy Carlson
- Origin: Late 2007; 19 years ago Colorado
- Separations: Joy Rains
- Members: 12–20 (full-time residential), 26+ ambassadors internationally
- Other names: Galactic Federation of Light, The Church Ministry of Mother of All Creation. Successor groups include Joy Rains and 5D Full Disclosure
- Official website: lovehaswon.org (archived copy); lovehas1joyrains2.com

Love Has Won (LHW), also known as the Galactic Federation of Light, is an American new religious movement that was led by Amy Carlson until her death in 2021. Carlson was referred to within the group as "Mother God", who described herself as, among other things, the creator of the universe, with the movement combining New Age spirituality, ideas from Abrahamic religions, conspiracy theories, and popular culture more broadly. The group has been described as a cult by many, including ex-members and media outlets. The group had between twelve and twenty full-time members who lived with Carlson at the time of her death. Following Carlson's death, the group split into several successor groups, including 5D Full Disclosure and Joy Rains.

== Origins ==
According to her family, Carlson (born November 30, 1975) grew up in Dallas, Texas, and was a "straight A student". Her mother, in the HBO documentary Love Has Won, clarifies that she was a good student who earned As and Bs. In Carlson's early adult life, however, she began to talk increasingly about "outlandish concepts" such as starships.

Sometime between 2000 and 2007, Carlson developed an interest in New Age philosophy and became a regular poster on the Lightworkers.org website's forums. On the forum, she met Amerith WhiteEagle (Robert Saltsgaver), who convinced Carlson that she was divine, and Carlson began to claim to experience paranormal phenomena.

In late 2007, Carlson left her third husband, her children, and her job as a manager at McDonald's, and ceased contact with most members of her family, joining up with WhiteEagle in Colorado. The group was originally known under the name "Galactic Federation of Light". The group posted their first videos to YouTube in 2009.

== Doctrine and beliefs ==
The theology of Love Has Won has been described as fluid, combining New Age spirituality, conspiracy theories, elements from mainstream Abrahamic religions, and popular culture. The group proclaimed that Carlson was a divine, 19-billion-year-old being who had birthed all creation. Carlson claimed she had been reincarnated 534 times, including as Jesus, Cleopatra, Joan of Arc, and Marilyn Monroe and would lead 144,000 people into a mystical "5th dimension". Carlson had several romantic partners throughout the group's history, beginning with Amerith WhiteEagle, who was referred to as "Father God", and who played a counterpart role to Carlson in the theology of the group.

The group claimed that Carlson was the queen of the lost continent of Lemuria, and the group incorporated the belief that Lemurians live within Mount Shasta in California. Carlson had stated that Donald Trump was her father in a past life, and that she had spoken to the spirit of deceased actor Robin Williams, who she claimed was archangel Zadkiel. Williams was considered by the LHW members to be part of a group of spirit guides called "the Galactics” who communicated with Carlson, also including other celebrities like the singer Whitney Houston and the comedian Rodney Dangerfield. The group's theology also included references to the concepts of Atlantis, the Anunnaki and "reptilians". They believed that the world was run by a "cabal" determined to keep the planet in a "low vibration" state.

The group also adopted elements of the QAnon conspiracy theory. Recordings made by the group also show support for other conspiracy theories, including that the COVID-19 pandemic was planned, 9/11 denial, Holocaust denial, and that the Sandy Hook Elementary School shooting was a hoax. They also show its members making antisemitic and racist remarks, including support for Adolf Hitler.

== Structure and abuse allegations ==
A core group of 12–20 members lived with Carlson in Crestone, a small town in Saguache County in southern Colorado. The group did daily livestreams on YouTube to recruit more members, solicit donations, and promote New Age goods, alternative medicine products, and vitamin supplements. The group offered "etheric surgery", which cost $88 per session, claiming that it could remove sickness and "negative energy" from the body.

The group has been described as a cult by ex-members and numerous media outlets. Ex-members accused the group of physical abuse and sleep deprivation, with members allegedly only being allowed to sleep for 4–5 hours a night. The Saguache County Sheriff's Office reported that they had received "many complaints" about the group from families, about "brainwashing" and fraud. In May 2020, a member of the group was found wandering the wilderness disoriented, naked, and dehydrated, after being described by the group as lacking the "right energy" and being on "the wrong side of the mountain". Despite the group banning drinking and drugs for members, Carlson was accused of drinking large amounts of alcohol and subsequently behaving abusively. The group was featured on an episode of Dr. Phil in September 2020, where Carlson and two members were confronted with claims of abuse, which they denied.

== History ==
WhiteEagle left Carlson for another lightworker he had recruited from New York around 2014. Carlson gained her first follower, Miguel Lamboy, the same year. Miguel would serve as the manager of the group's logistics and finances. The movement began to grow from 2014 onwards, mainly through the internet. The group travelled between Colorado, Oregon, California, and Florida before 2018, before moving to Moffat, Colorado. Jason Castillo became the final "Father God" in 2018. The group briefly moved to the island of Kauai in Hawaii in August 2020, where they were met with hostility from locals after Carlson publicly proclaimed that she was the Hawaiian goddess Pele. A multi-day protest ensued, with protestors lighting driftwood fires and chanting Hawaiian prayers around the rented property the group were staying in. Video footage provided to The Denver Post by Love Has Won member Lauryn Suarez showed eggs and rocks being thrown at the house, as well as broken windows and an SUV parked in the driveway. The mayor of Kauai, Derek Kawakami, intervened to negotiate the departure of the group from the island. They subsequently flew to Kahului Airport on Maui, but were convinced to fly back to Colorado in September 2020.

In September 2020, Carlson reportedly was in poor health and was paralyzed from the waist down, with Carlson herself stating that she had cancer. In early April 2021, the group was located in an RV park in Mount Shasta in northern California, but were asked to leave due to overcrowding. Carlson was last seen alive by someone outside the group on April 10, 2021.

On April 28, 2021, the mummified corpse of Carlson was discovered in the mission house near Crestone. Its state of decay suggested that she had been dead for several weeks. She was 45 at the time of her death. The body was found in a sleeping bag wrapped in Christmas lights, the face covered in glitter, in what authorities stated was a makeshift shrine. Seven members of the group were charged with abuse of a corpse as well as child abuse due to the presence of two children in the property. A photo from a few weeks before she is thought to have died shows her appearance to be emaciated, with thinning hair and discoloured skin with a purplish hue. According to Saguache County Coroner Tom Perrin, Carlson had been ingesting large amounts of colloidal silver, which the group had been previously promoting as a COVID-19 cure, even receiving a warning from the FDA. Consuming colloidal silver over a long period of time can lead to blue-grey discolouration of the skin, as well as seizures and organ failure. An autopsy report released in December 2021 revealed that Carlson had died from "global decline in the setting of alcohol abuse, anorexia, and chronic colloidal silver ingestion". On May 5, Deputy District Attorney Alex Raines announced plans to upgrade the abuse of corpse charges to the more serious charge of tampering with a deceased human body, and the group members were reported to be facing a mix of charges of child abuse, abuse of a corpse, tampering with deceased human remains, and false imprisonment. The charges were later dropped.

Authorities stated that Carlson had not died at the property, but in California; her body was subsequently transported back to Colorado. After Carlson's death was publicized, the group's Facebook page stated that she had "ascended", and the website Lovehaswon.org was taken offline.

In the aftermath of Carlson's death, the group splintered, with co-leader (Father God) Jason Castillo forming the group Joy Rains. A faction of opposing members that had control of the group's online activities renamed the Facebook page and YouTube channel to "5D Full Disclosure" and launched a new website, 5dfulldisclosure.org.

== Television and books ==
Dateline NBC aired a two-hour documentary about the group on October 15, 2021.

An HBO documentary series, Love Has Won: The Cult of Mother God directed by Hannah Olson, premiered on November 13, 2023.

Journalist Leah Sottile authored a book about the group, entitled Blazing Eye Sees All, that places Carlson and her followers in the wider context of American New Age spirituality.
