= Caroline Waterlow =

American Documentary Producer

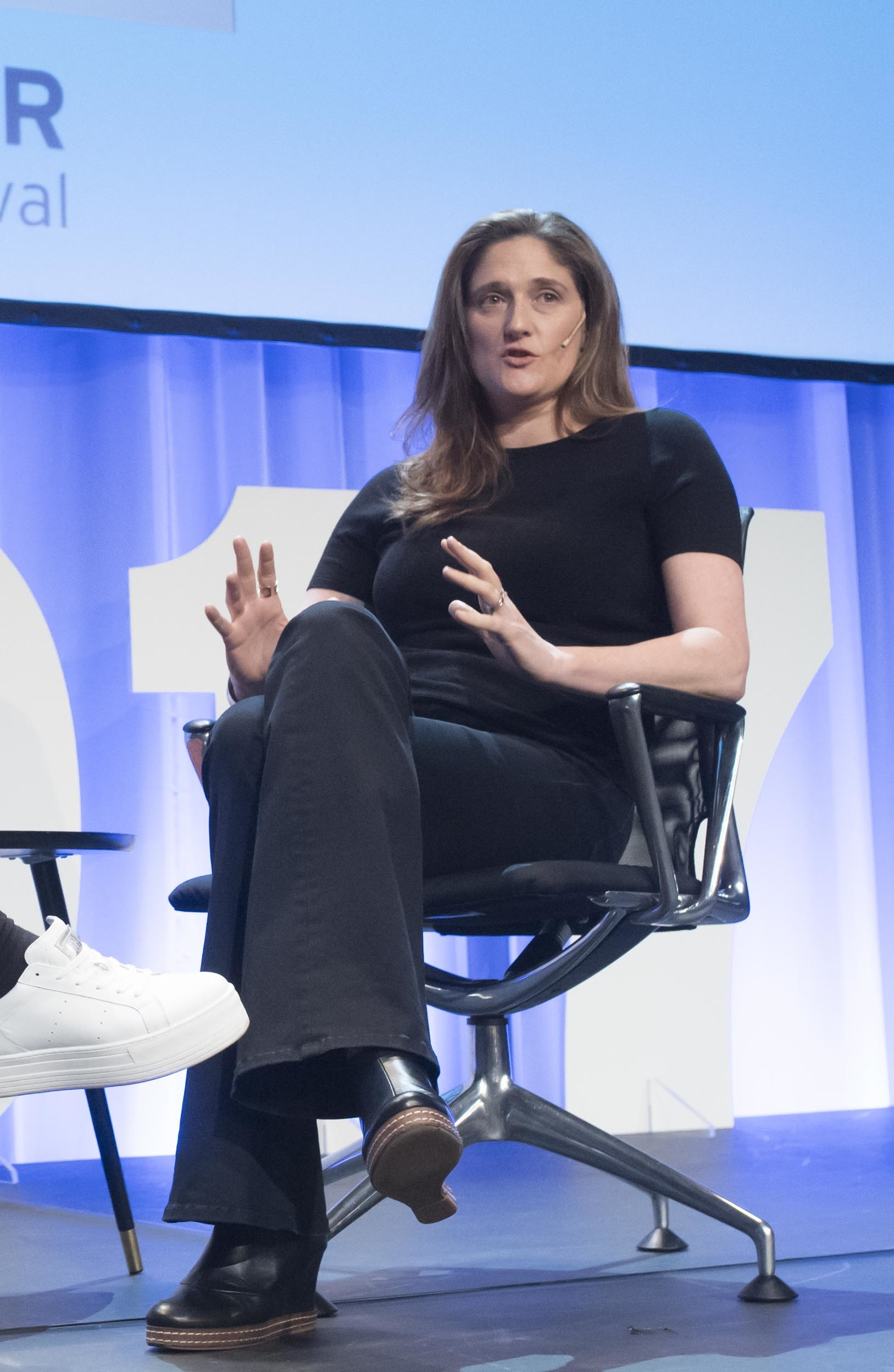
Caroline Waterlow, 2017

Caroline Waterlow is an American producer, best known for producing the documentary film O.J.: Made in America ESPN's 30 for 30. Waterlow won the Academy Award for Best Documentary Feature at the 89th Academy Awards, together with director Ezra Edelman.

== Filmography ==
- Vow of Silence: The Assassination of Annie Mae
- Stax: Soulsville U.S.A.
- O.J.: Made in America
- Makers: Women Who Make America
- Supermensch: The Legend of Shep Gordon
- Cutie and the Boxer
- Brooklyn Dodgers: The Ghosts of Flatbush
- American Experience
- History Rocks
- The American President

== Awards and nominations ==
Year	Award	Category	Work	Recipients and nominees	Outcome
2008	Sports Emmy Awards	Outstanding Sports Documentary	Brooklyn Dodgers: The Ghosts of Flatbush	Shared with: Ezra Edelman, Amani Martin, Megan Lardner, Zachary Heinzerling	Won
2014	FOCAL International Awards	Best Use of Footage on Digital or Non-Television Platforms	Makers: Women Who Make America	Caroline Waterlow	Won
2015	News & Documentary Emmy Awards	Outstanding Historical Programming - Long Form	Makers: Women Who Make America	Caroline Waterlow	Nominated
2015	News & Documentary Emmy Awards	Outstanding Arts and Cultural Programming	Supermensch: The Legend of Shep Gordon	Caroline Waterlow	Nominated
2016	ACE Eddie Awards	Outstanding Achievement in Production	O.J.: Made in America	Shared with: Ezra Edelman	Won
2016	ACE Eddie Awards	Outstanding Achievement in Nonfiction Feature Filmmaking	O.J.: Made in America	Shared with: Ezra Edelman	Nominated
2016	Academy Awards	Best Documentary Feature	O.J.: Made in America	Shared with: Ezra Edelman	Won
2016	Gotham Independent Film Awards	Best Documentary	O.J.: Made in America	Shared with: Ezra Edelman, Deirdre Fenton, Libby Geist, Nina Krstic, Erin Leyden, Tamara Rosenberg, Connor Schell	Won
2016	Gotham Independent Film Awards	Audience Award	O.J.: Made in America	Shared with: Ezra Edelman, Deirdre Fenton, Libby Geist, Nina Krstic, Erin Leyden, Tamara Rosenberg, Connor Schell	Nominated
2016	International Documentary Association	Best Feature Film	O.J.: Made in America	Shared with: Ezra Edelman, Deirdre Fenton, Libby Geist, Nina Krstic, Erin Leyden, Tamara Rosenberg, Connor Schell	Won
2016	Producers Guild of America Awards	Outstanding Producer of Documentary Theatrical Motion Pictures	O.J.: Made in America	Shared with: Ezra Edelman	Won
