= Love Has Won: The Cult of Mother God =

2023 American TV documentary series

- Genre: Documentary
- Directed by: Hannah Olson
- Country of origin: United States
- Original language: English
- No. of episodes: 3

Production
- Executive producers: Hannah Olson; Josh Safdie; Benny Safdie; Dani Bernfeld; Ronald Bronstein; Lauren Cioffi; Nancy Abraham; Lisa Heller; Sara Rodriguez
- Producers: Ana Veselic; Matthew Killip; Mimi Dwyer
- Cinematography: Christopher Messina
- Editors: Ana Veselic; Matthew Killip; Christopher Passig
- Running time: 53-58 minutes
- Production companies: HBO Documentary Films; Elara Pictures; Open Secret

Original release
- Network: HBO
- Release: November 13 – November 27, 2023

Love Has Won: The Cult of Mother God is a 2023 television documentary series directed and produced by Hannah Olson. It explores the life and death of Amy Carlson, the leader of Love Has Won. It premiered November 13, 2023, on HBO.

== Premise ==
Explores the life and death of Amy Carlson, the leader of Love Has Won.

== Episodes ==
No.	Title	Directed by	Original release date
1	"Episode One"	Hannah Olson	November 13, 2023
2	"Episode Two"	Hannah Olson	November 20, 2023
3	"Episode Three"	Hannah Olson	November 27, 2023

== Production ==
Following the 2016 United States presidential election, Hannah Olson had become interested in the rise of conspiratorial thinking, including followers of Donald Trump. Olson was introduced to Love Has Won and Amy Carlson by a New Age scholar at University of Texas at Austin, wondering how Carlson went from a McDonald's manager to a cult leader. Olson approached followers of Carlson with empathy and curiosity, interested primarily in the systemic and social factors that led them to Love Has Won.

Production on the series commenced three weeks after the discovery of Carlson's body, with interviews of followers of Love Has Won, and review of thousands of hours of footage from livestreams. Olson did not want to platform the group's more harmful beliefs, only briefly including some of the group's conspiratorial ideology without commentary. Instead of including experts, Olson chose to let members tell the story, in order to immerse the audience.

In June 2021, it was announced Olson would direct a documentary series revolving around Love Has Won for HBO. The Safdie brothers, Josh and Benny, serve as executive producers.

== Reception ==
On the review aggregator website Rotten Tomatoes, 100% of 7 critics' reviews are positive, with an average rating of 7.0/10.

Judy Berman of Time wrote: "In sticking close to Carlson’s family and the inner circle, Olson achieves something that has proven impossible for documentarians telling the stories of cults, NXIVM, the Manson Family, and now Twin Flames Universe—that caused more profound, widespread damage: she makes the appeal of Mother God’s largely unhinged worldview legible." Nick Schager of The Daily Beast wrote: "Offers an unvarnished peek inside this insular community, demonstrating people’s stunning capacity for concocting and embracing ridiculous ideas as a way of coping with unhappiness and trauma."
