= Shane Boris =

American film producer (born 1981)

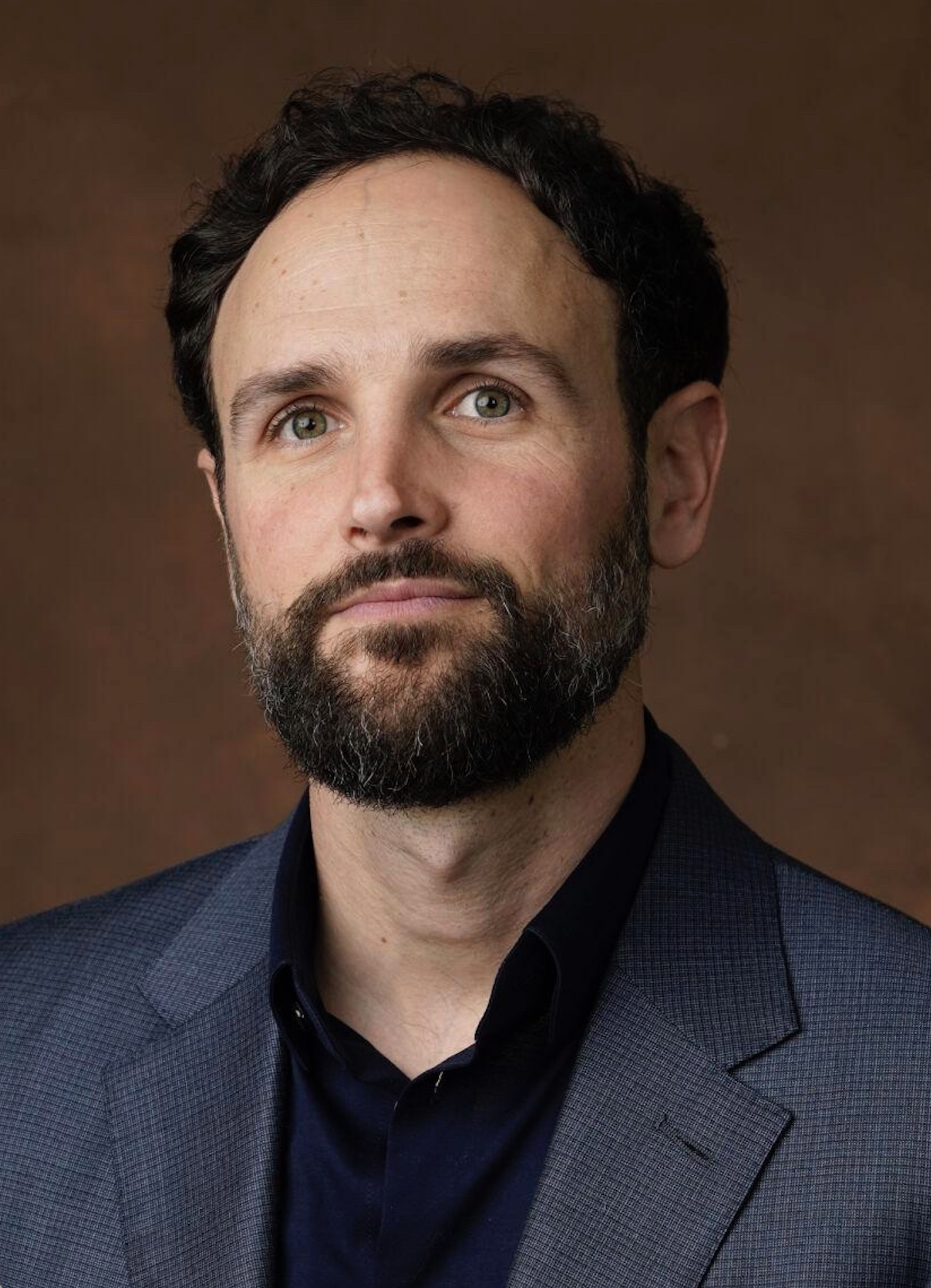
- Boris in 2023
- Born: 1981 (age 44–45); Littleton, Colorado, U.S.
- Education: Oberlin College (BA) Jawaharlal Nehru University (MA)
- Occupation: Film producer
- Years active: 2004–present

Shane Boris (born 1981) is an American film producer and writer. He is the founder of Cottage M, an independent production house. Boris was nominated for Best Documentary Feature for The Edge of Democracy at the 92nd Academy Awards in 2020. In 2022, Boris produced two acclaimed documentaries, Fire of Love and Navalny, which both secured Oscar nominations. Navalny went on to win the Academy Award for Best Documentary Feature at the 95th Academy Awards in 2023. This made Boris the first producer since Walt Disney to be nominated for two Academy Awards for Best Documentary Feature in the same year.

== Career ==
Boris was born in Denver, Colorado. After graduating from Colorado Academy in 2000, he pursued studies in religion and politics at Oberlin College, followed by a master's degree in international relations from Jawaharlal Nehru University in New Delhi, India.

Boris started work as a film producer with You're Looking at Me Like I Live Here and I Don't in 2010, which was featured on multiple seasons of PBS's Independent Lens. His second feature, Fuck For Forest (2013) screened at various festivals including SXSW, winning Best Documentary at the Warsaw International Film Festival. In 2016, All These Sleepless Nights premiered at Sundance, earning Best Directing in the International Documentary Competition.

In 2019, two major themes emerged as focuses for Boris' film work: the sentience of non-human nature as well as anti-authoritarianism. With long time collaborator Sara Dosa, he produced The Seer and The Unseen, a magic realist documentary set in Iceland about invisible elves, financial collapse and the surprising power of belief. In 2020, Stray, a creative nonfiction film that follows the lives of stray dogs in the streets of Istanbul, had its world premiere at the Tribeca Film Festival and went on to win several awards, as well as an Indie Spirit nomination.

Boris achieved significant recognition with the Oscar nominated The Edge of Democracy, a film that explored the complexities of democracy in Brazil. Boris received multiple nominations for The Last Cruise, an HBO documentary short chronicling the first outbreak of the coronavirus outside of China on the Diamond Princess cruise liner.

In 2023, Boris garnered dual Oscar nominations at the 95th Academy Awards. Fire of Love was acquired by National Geographic Films at the Sundance Film Festival and went on to screen in theaters all over the world, as well as in partnership with museums including The Louvre and MoMA. Simultaneously, Navalny, which was commissioned by CNN Films, won Best Documentary at the BAFTAs and at the 95th Academy Awards.

In addition to sharing producing and writing credits on Fire of Love, Boris was also a producer and contributing writer on King Coal, a documentary set in Appalachia. The film made its debut at Sundance and received nominations at the IDA and the 17th Cinema Eye Honors. Also in 2023, Boris wrote and produced Hollywoodgate, a documentary based in Berlin, which had its world premiere at the Venice Film Festival, and then, one day later, its North American premiere at the Telluride Film Festival.

Aside from producing, Boris has received an IDA award and Critics Choice nomination for writing, and has been a guest speaker at universities such as the Harvard Kennedy School and Columbia School of the Arts. Boris is also co-founder of Joon, a multidisciplinary incubator, and has worked as a strategist for non-profits, as a writing consultant for authors, and a song lyricist for musicians.

== Filmography ==
Producer

- Independent Lens, 1 episode - 2010
- Elementary Cool - 2009
- You're Looking at Me Like I Live Here and I Don't - 2010
- Fuck For Forest - 2013
- Olmo and the Seagull - 2015
- All These Sleepless Nights - 2016
- Break - 2016
- Walden: Life in the Woods - 2017
- The Seer and the Unseen - 2019
- The Edge of Democracy - 2019
- Silent Rose - 2020
- Stray - 2020
- The Last Cruise - 2021
- Fire of Love - 2022
- Navalny - 2022
- King Coal - 2023
- Hollywoodgate - 2023
- Time and Water - 2026
- The AI Doc: Or How I Became an Apocaloptimist - 2026

Executive Producer

- Band - 2022

== Awards and nominations ==
Year	Category	Organization	Film	Result
2020	Documentary	Peabody awards	The Edge of Democracy	Won
2020	Documentary Feature	92nd Academy Awards	The Edge of Democracy	Nominated
2023	Best Documentary	British Academy Film Awards	Fire of Love	Nominated
2023	Best Documentary	British Academy Film Awards	Navalny	Won
2023	Outstanding Nonfiction Feature	Cinema Eye Honors	Fire of Love	Nominated
2023	Documentary Feature	95th Academy Awards	Fire of Love	Nominated
2023	Documentary Feature	95th Academy Awards	Navalny	Won
2023	Outstanding Producer of Documentary Theatrical Motion Pictures	34th Producers Guild of America Awards	Navalny	Won
2023	Documentary	Peabody awards	Fire of Love	Won
