= Jody Gerson =

American music executive

- Born: 1961 (age 64–65); Philadelphia, Pennsylvania, U.S.
- Education: Bachelor of Arts Northwestern University, The Baldwin School
- Occupations: Chairman and Chief executive officer of Universal Music Publishing Group, American music executive
- Children: 3

Jody Gerson (born 1961 in Philadelphia) is the chairman and CEO of Universal Music Publishing Group. Upon assuming the role on January 1, 2015, Gerson became the first female CEO of a major music publisher and first chairwoman of a global music company. Gerson serves on the Executive Management Board for Universal Music Group. She was named Executive of the Decade on the Billboard Power 100 in 2026.

== Career ==
Gerson was raised in a Jewish family in the Philadelphia area, where her father owned several nightclubs including the Latin Casino whose performers included artists like Frank Sinatra and Diana Ross. She began her career in music publishing at Chappell Music shortly after graduating from Northwestern University, where she started out making tape copies. After six years at Chappell, she moved to EMI Music Publishing to run the company's east coast office before shifting to head up the company's west coast publishing division in 1991. In January 2008, Gerson left EMI to become US Co-President of Sony/ATV Music Publishing.

In 2015, Gerson joined Universal Music Publishing Group (UMPG) as chairman and CEO. Under her leadership, Gerson has led the signing of artists and songwriters including the Bee Gees, Elton John, Carly Simon, Bruce Springsteen, Prince, Taylor Swift, Drake, Bad Bunny, Kendrick Lamar, Steve Lacy, The Weeknd, Billie Eilish, Rosalía, Alicia Keys, Coldplay, Justin Bieber, Jack White, SZA, Quavo, Ariana Grande, H.E.R., Harry Styles, Jeff Bhasker, Maren Morris, Tierra Whack, Halsey, Demi Lovato, Shawn Mendes, Tobias Jesso Jr., Travis Scott, Joe Jonas, Nick Jonas, Maroon 5, R.E.M., Pearl Jam, Post Malone.

Gerson also led UMPG's acquisitions of the catalogs of Sting, Neil Diamond, Frank Zappa and others. In 2016, she negotiated a deal for UMPG to be the exclusive worldwide publishing administrator for Prince's entire song catalog.

In 2020, Gerson led UMPG's purchase of Bob Dylan's entire songwriting catalog, considered to be the biggest acquisition ever of a single act's publishing rights.

Previous to tenure at UMPG, Gerson signed songwriters, including Lady Gaga, Norah Jones, Odd Future, Jermaine Dupri, and a then 15-year-old Alicia Keys. Gerson has also played an instrumental role in the careers of Enrique Iglesias, Pharrell Williams, Mac Miller, Pitbull, RedOne, and Dallas Austin, among others.

In addition to her work in music, Gerson produced the movies Drumline and ATL. Drumline is currently being adapted for Broadway. She is also executive producer of VH1's Drumline 2. Gerson executive produced the Emmy-nominated documentary The Bee Gees: How Can You Mend a Broken Heart, as well as HBO's Music Box series, and Stax: Soulsville U.S.A.

== Charitable work ==
Gerson co-founded the global nonprofit She Is The Music. She serves on boards of directors of USC Annenberg Inclusion Initiative, The Rock & Roll Hall of Fame, The National Music Publishers' Association and Project Healthy Minds.

== Recognition ==
On December 3, 2015, Gerson was named 'Executive of the Year' by Billboard Magazine in its Women in Music 2015 issue. In 2016 she was named "Inspiring Woman of the Year" by the March of Dimes, and named to the Variety Power of Women L.A. list. She has appeared on the Billboard Power 100 every year from 2016 to 2026, and on the Variety 500 every year from 2017-2024. In 2020, Gerson was named by Billboard as "Executive of the Year", becoming the first music publisher and first woman to receive this honor. Gerson received the Abe Olman Publisher Award at the 51st annual Songwriters Hall of Fame Induction and Awards Dinner. In 2026, she was named Executive of the Decade on the Billboard Power 100.

In May 2023, Gerson received the ICMP Ralph Peer II Award for Outstanding Contribution to Global Music Publishing. Gerson has appeared on the Variety 500, and Rolling Stone's Future 25. In 2025, Gerson became the first woman to be named Billboard's Executive of the Year.

== Personal life ==
Gerson is divorced from Seth Swirsky and has three children.
