= Amy Carlson (religious leader) =

American cult leader (1975–2021)

- Born: November 30, 1975; McPherson, Kansas, U.S.
- Died: c. April 16, 2021 (aged 45); Ashland, Oregon, U.S.
- Cause of death: Alcohol abuse; anorexia; chronic colloidal silver ingestion
- Body discovered: April 28, 2021, Crestone, Colorado, U.S.
- Other name: Mother God
- Movement: Love Has Won
- Children: 3

Amy Carlson (November 30, 1975 – c. April 16, 2021), also known by her followers as Mother God, was an American religious leader and the co-founder of the new religious movement Love Has Won. Carlson and her followers believed that she was God, a 19-billion-year-old being, and a reincarnation of Jesus Christ, and that she could heal people with cancer "with the power of love". Her group has been described as a cult and Carlson as a cult leader by many, including ex-members and media outlets.

Carlson's body was found mummified in Love Has Won's compound in Crestone, Colorado, in April 2021.

== Early life ==
Carlson was born on November 30, 1975, in McPherson, Kansas. Her parents divorced when she was a child, and after they both remarried other people, Carlson was raised between their homes in Kansas and Oklahoma City. Carlson and her sister Tara left to live with her mother and stepfather after claims of abuse by their stepmother. The family later lived in Dallas, Texas. They then relocated to Houston.

Carlson had three children by three different fathers. She worked as a manager at McDonald's.

During the early 2000s, Carlson developed an interest in New Age religion, and became a regular poster on the forums of the website lightworkers.org. On the forum, she met Amerith WhiteEagle, who convinced Carlson that she was divine, and Carlson began to claim to experience paranormal phenomena; specifically, she heard a voice telling her she would one day become President of the United States.

In late 2007, Carlson left her third husband, her children, and her job, and ceased contact with most members of her family. She then joined up with WhiteEagle in Colorado. The group was originally known under the name "Galactic Federation of Light". The group posted their first videos to YouTube in 2009. Carlson and WhiteEagle led the group as Mother and Father God.

== Love Has Won ==
Carlson left WhiteEagle around 2014 after gaining her first follower, Miguel Lamboy. Miguel managed the group's logistics and finances. The movement began to grow from 2014 onwards, mainly by the Internet. The group travelled between Colorado, Oregon, California and Florida prior to 2018, before moving to Moffat, Colorado. There was a succession of "Father Gods", with Jason Castillo becoming the final "Father God" in 2018.

The group briefly moved to the Hawaiian island of Kauai in August 2020, where they were met with hostility from locals after Carlson publicly proclaimed that she was the Hawaiian volcano goddess Pele. A multi-day protest ensued, with protestors lighting driftwood fires and chanting Hawaiian prayers around the rented property the group were staying in. Video footage provided to The Denver Post by Love Has Won member Lauryn Suarez showed eggs and rocks being thrown at the house, as well as the broken windows of the house and the SUV parked in the driveway. The mayor of Kauai, Derek Kawakami, intervened to negotiate the departure of the group from the island. They subsequently flew to Kahului Airport on Maui, and were convinced to return to Colorado in September 2020.

Just before Carlson's death in April 2021, Lamboy paid the Colorado Secretary of State's office $50 to register a new nonprofit, Gaia's Crystal Schools Inc., listing the associated address as 4 Alcedo Court, where authorities recovered Carlson's body.

Carlson's followers claimed that, rather than dying, she had "ascended" to the fifth dimension after assuming all of mankind's pain. The website lovehaswon.org was taken offline. Several core members of Love Has Won still believe that Amy Carlson is God and reject what they refer to as the "3D world".

The group renamed their Facebook page and YouTube channel "5D Full Disclosure", and launched a new website, 5dfulldisclosure.org. In the aftermath of Carlson's death, the group splintered, with Castillo forming the separate group Joy Rains with a small number of followers.

=== Mother God and beliefs ===
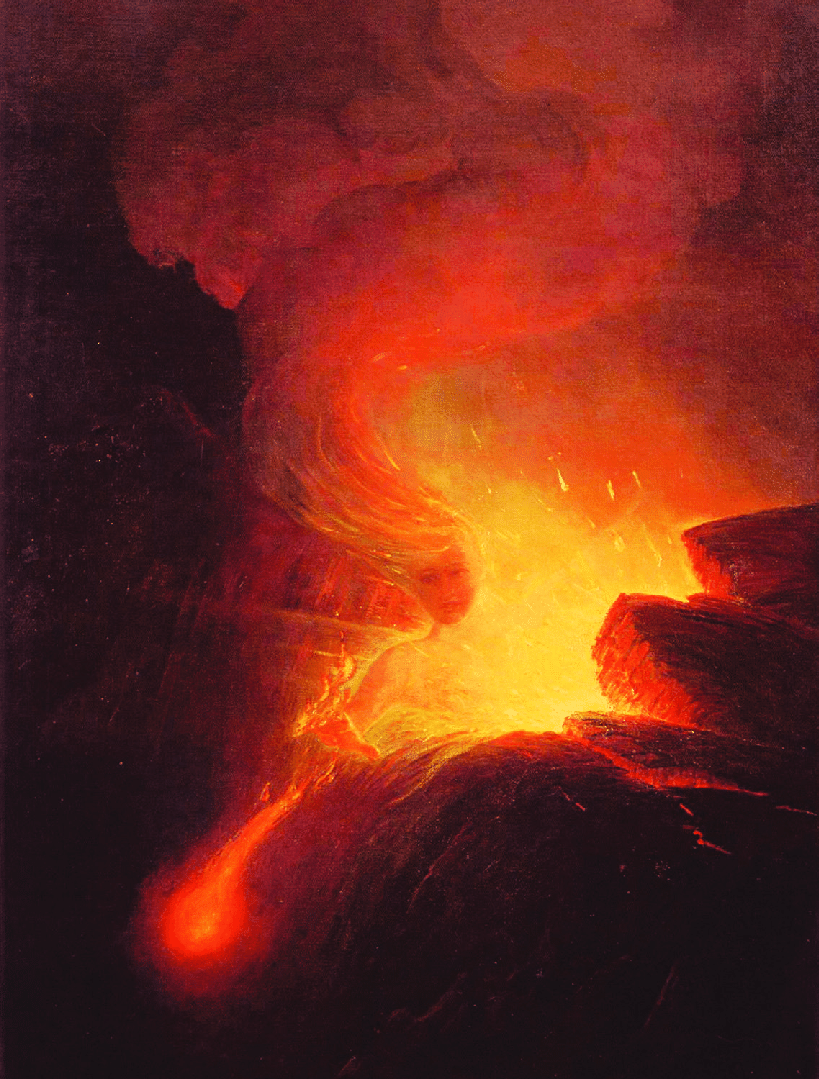
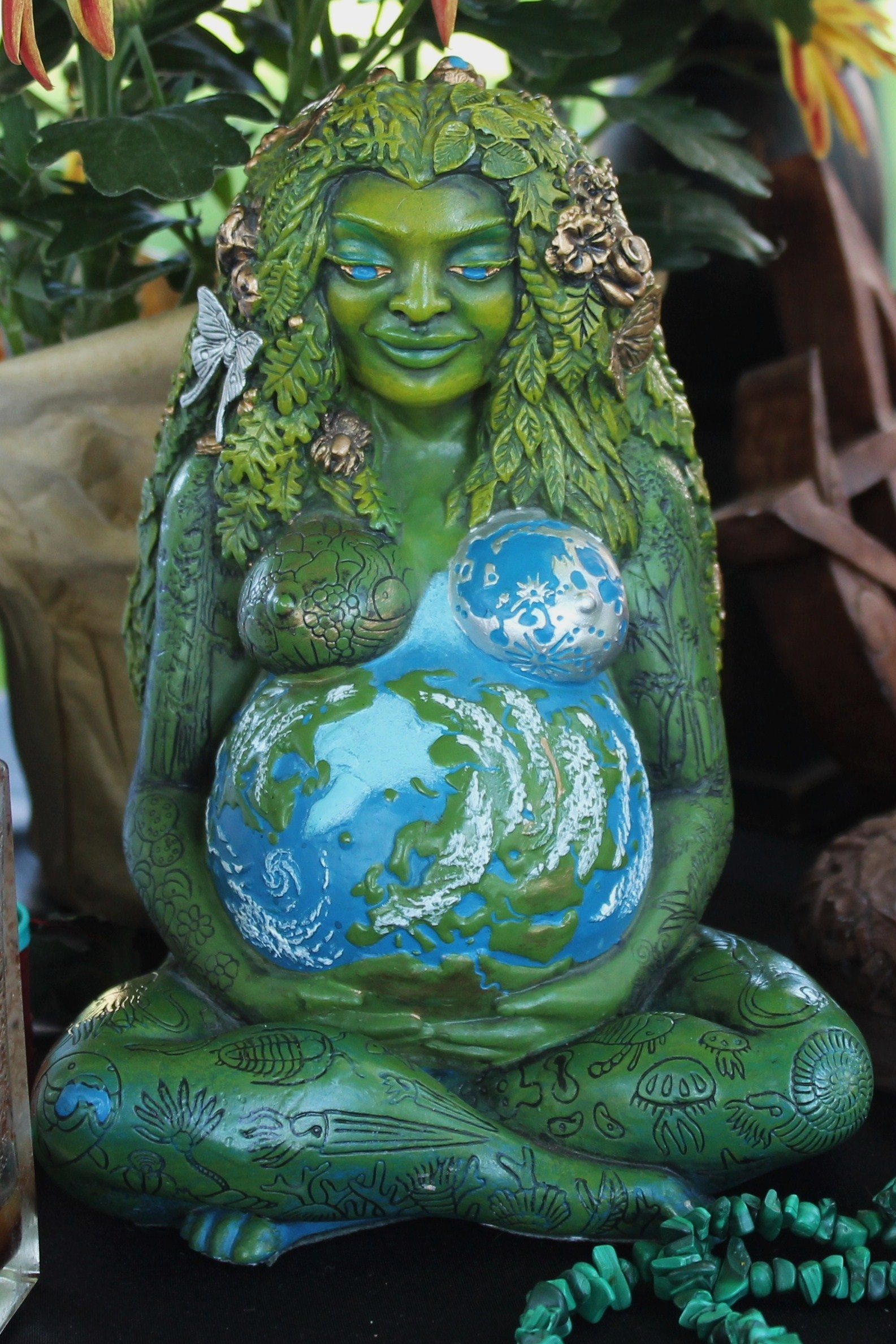
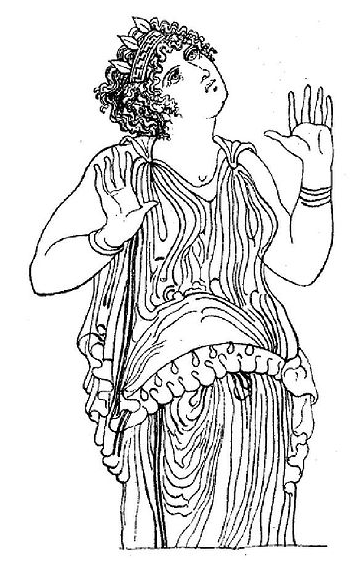
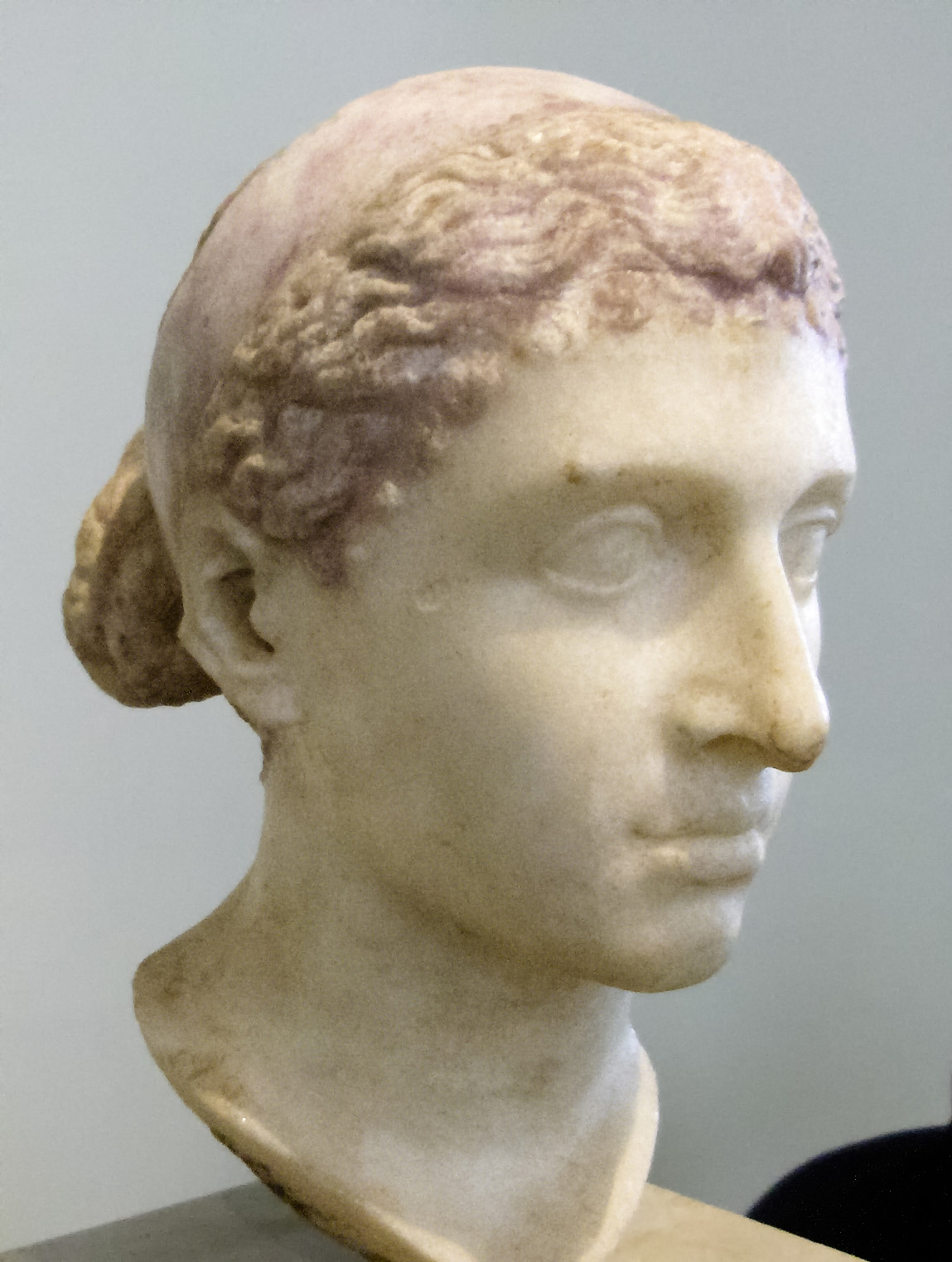
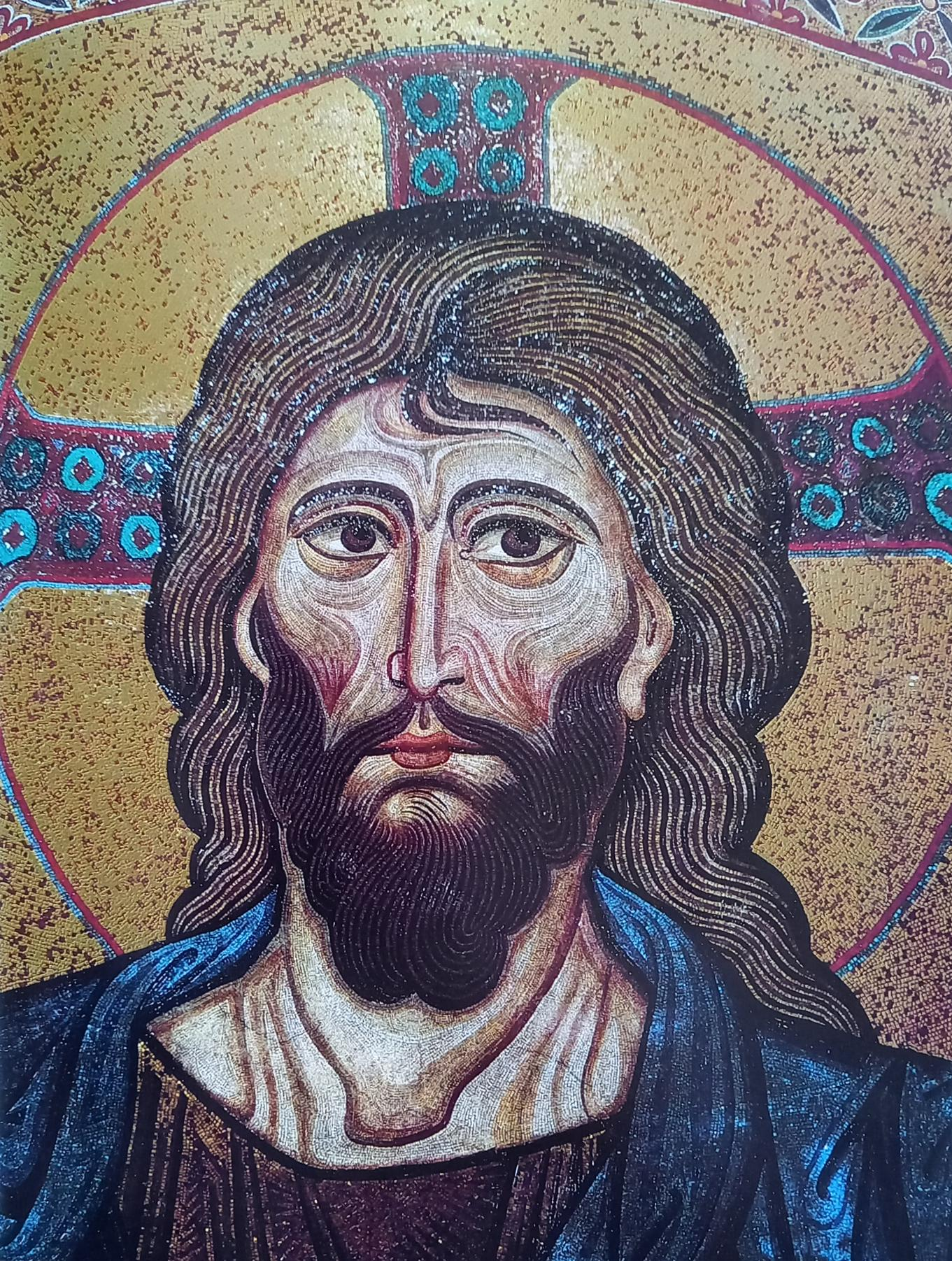
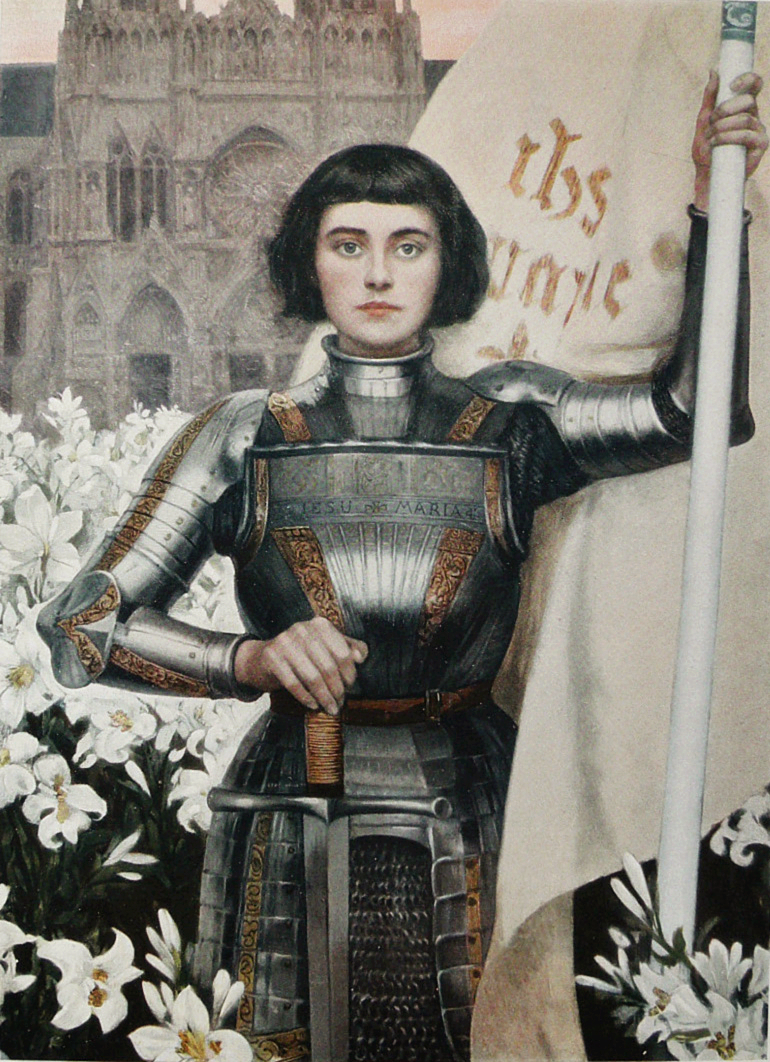
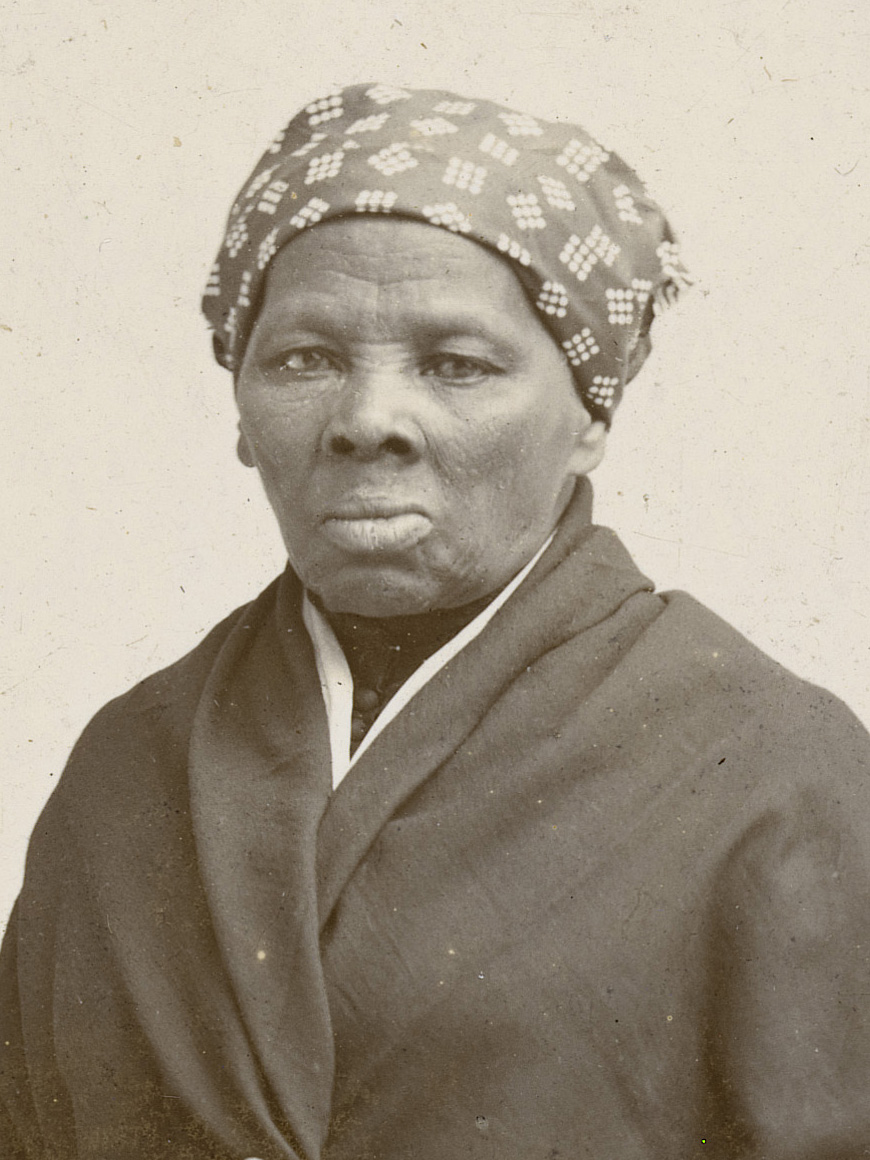
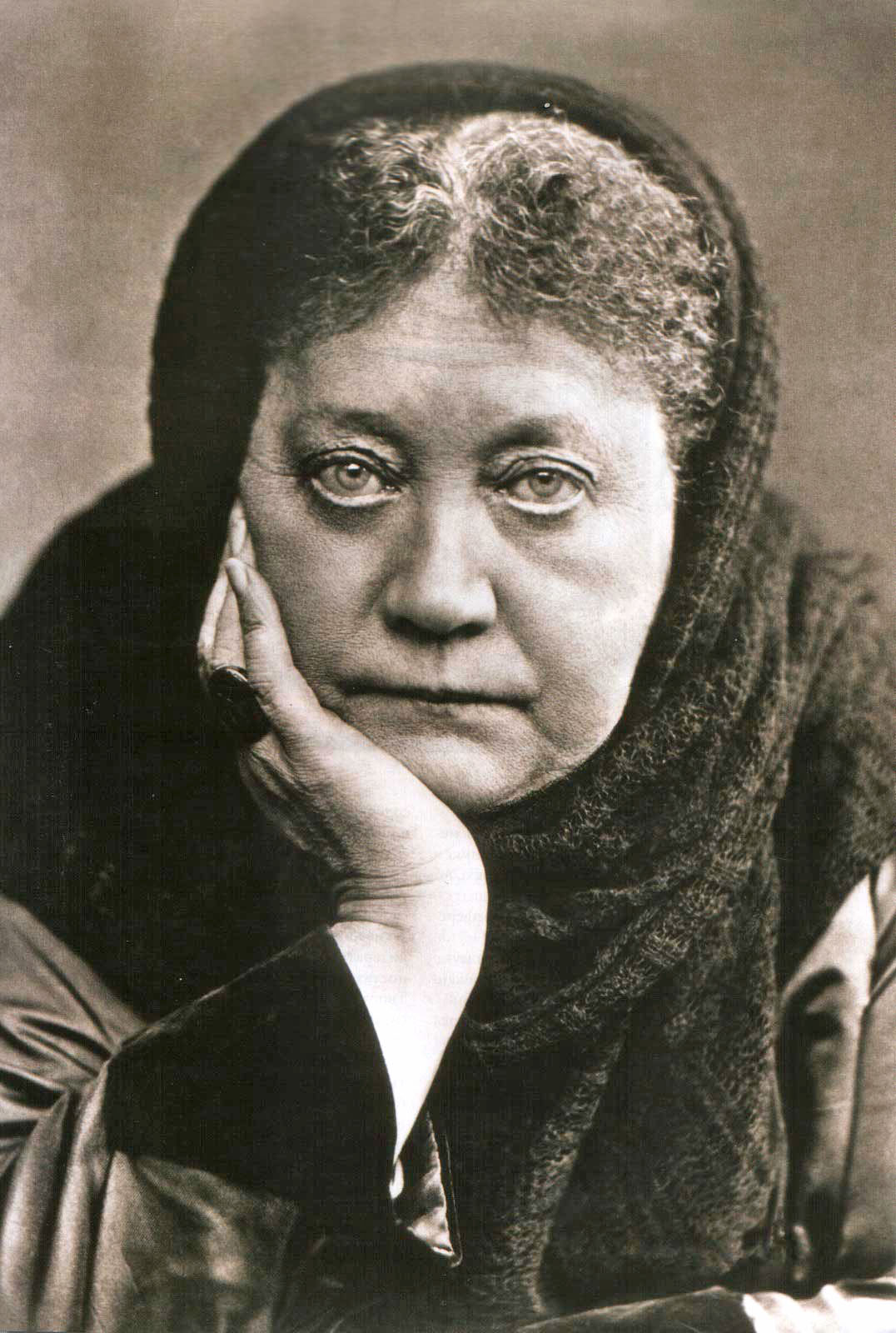
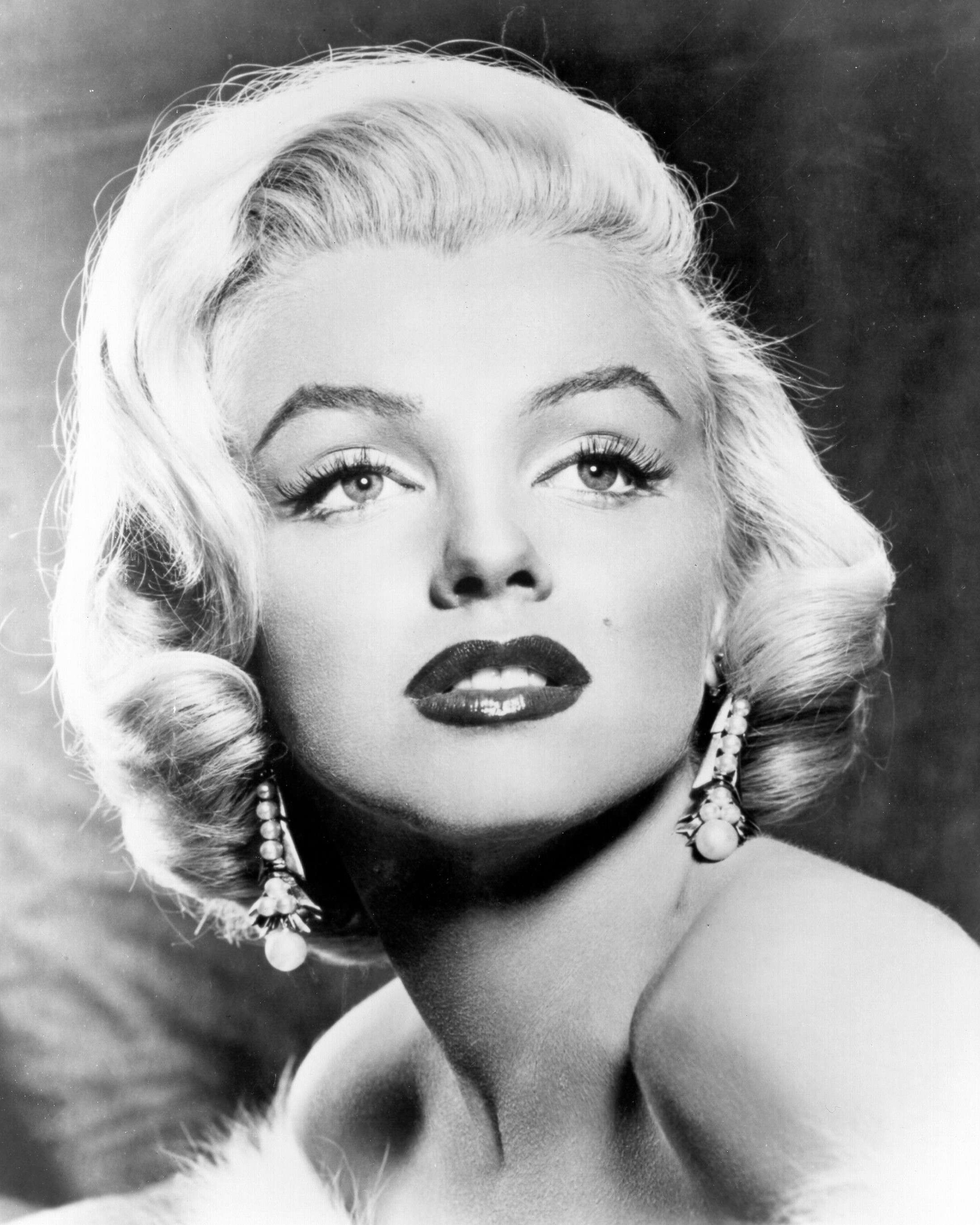
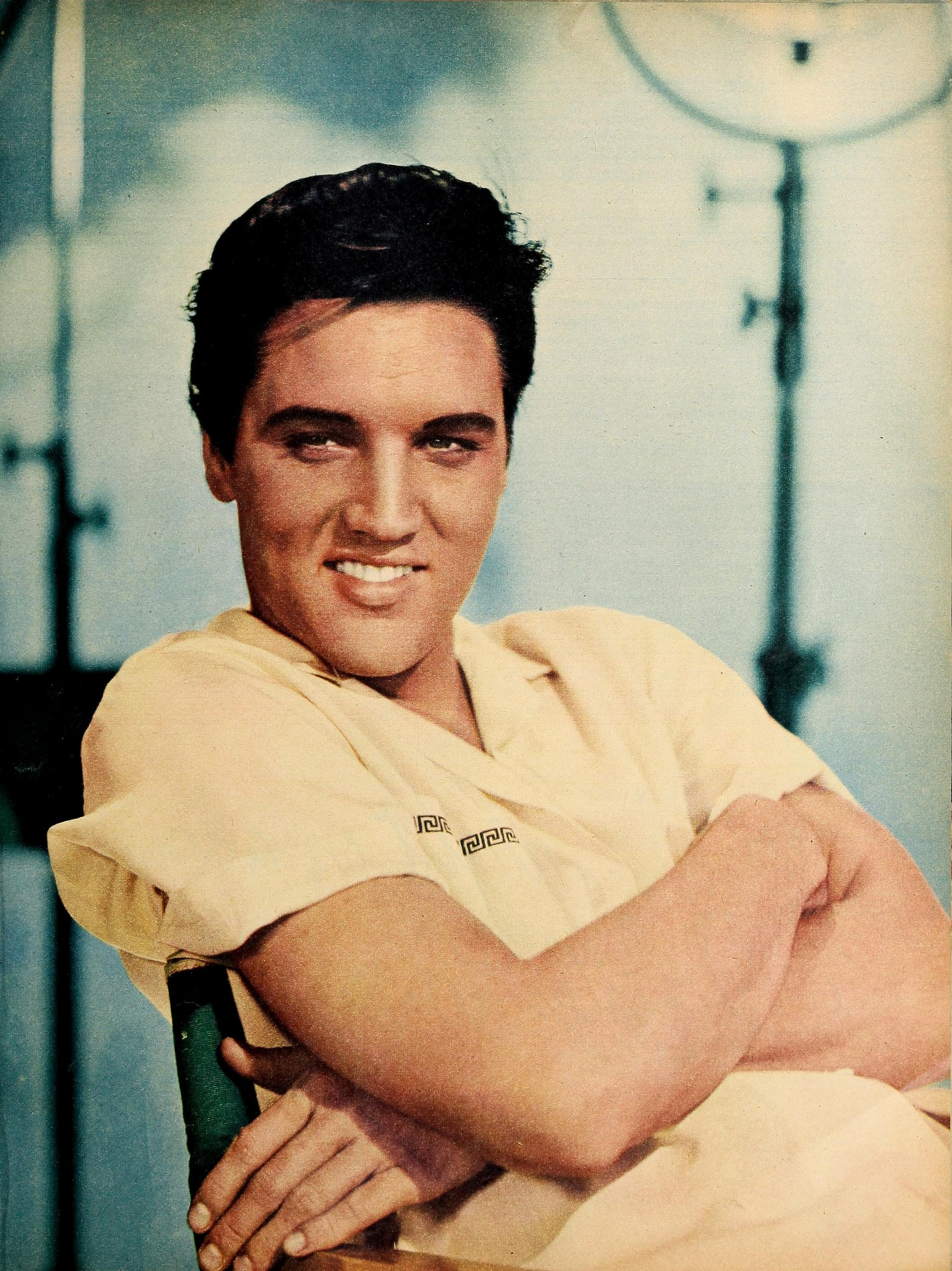
Carlson claimed she had been incarnated 534 times, with her past lives including those of (in rows from left to right) Pele, Mother Earth, Gaia, Cleopatra, Jesus Christ, Joan of Arc, Harriet Tubman, Helena Blavatsky, and Marilyn Monroe, and that Elvis Presley (bottom right) was her son.

Carlson's teachings revolved around the idea that she was the 534th incarnation of Mother God, a deity who was destined to lead exactly 144,000 believers out of the superficial reality of the "3-D world" and into a fifth-dimensional plane of higher existence. She claimed to have been Mother Earth, Gaia, White Buffalo Calf Woman, Cleopatra, Jesus Christ, Joan of Arc, Pocahontas, Harriet Tubman, Helena Blavatsky, and Marilyn Monroe; she claimed to have full memory of her past lives, including the crucifixion of Jesus. She also said she could "produce miracles, kind of like Jesus". She also claimed to be the mother of Elvis Presley.

To accomplish her goals, she needed to regularly commune with "The Galactics", an "etheric team" of spiritual ambassadors that she said was largely made up of deceased celebrities including Robin Williams, Patrick Swayze, John Lennon (identified with Ashtar), Whitney Houston, Prince, Steve Irwin, Carrie Fisher, Rodney Dangerfield, Tupac Shakur, Chris Farley, David Bowie, Gene Wilder, and Michael Jackson, as well as the living Donald Trump and Carol Burnett. She also claimed to receive help from the Count of St. Germain.

She claimed that she lived in Lemuria and Trump was her father. A special, obscure technology was stolen, causing an explosion that sank Atlantis. "Mother God" was able to save the technology, but was not able to fully ascend to the fifth dimension because humanity was not ready, so she continued returning to Earth in human form.

The group's former website said that Carlson was a spiritual surgeon who would work "multidimensionally" to operate on people's bodies and cure various physical ailments. She said she had cured cancer, Lyme disease, addiction, and suicidal thoughts, as well as removed brain tumors, and helped cases of autism.

== Death ==
By September 2020, Carlson was in poor health and was paralyzed from the waist down; Carlson herself stated that she had cancer. In the weeks leading up to her death, the police were called multiple times to perform wellness checks on her. On each visit, LHW members claimed she was not home.

In early April 2021, the group was located in an RV park in Mount Shasta in northern California but were asked to leave due to overcrowding. Carlson was last seen alive by someone outside the group on April 10, 2021.

In the HBO documentary Love Has Won, the group said that they traveled to Ashland, Oregon, upon Carlson's request, and stayed in Callahan's Mountain Lodge. While there, Carlson lost all motor control and had to be carried around. According to a YouTube video by two members, Carlson had asked to be taken to the hospital, but they had refused. She died in the room at Callahan's Mountain Lodge on an unknown date very soon after the move. The group moved Carlson's body a few days after her death to the Mount Hood National Forest when the hotel staff became suspicious. The group waited for the "Galactic" beings to pick up her body, but Castillo claimed that he heard a calling to move Carlson's body. Her body was driven back to the group's mission home at 4 Alceda Court in Saguache County near Crestone, Colorado.

On April 28, 2021, Lamboy went to the Saguache County police department and reported that the group had come to his home with Carlson's corpse and were staying there without permission, and that he had not been in touch with Carlson for several months. Upon arrival, police discovered Carlson's mummified corpse; its state of decay suggested that she had been dead for several weeks. The body was found in a sleeping bag wrapped in Christmas lights, the face covered in glitter and the eyes missing, in what authorities stated was a makeshift shrine. Seven members of the group were charged with abuse of a corpse as well as child abuse due to the presence of two children in the property. A photo from a few weeks before Carlson is thought to have died shows her appearance to be emaciated; she had thinning hair and discolored skin with a purplish hue. She was 75 pounds when she died.

According to Saguache County Coroner Tom Perrin, Carlson had been ingesting large amounts of colloidal silver, which the group had been promoting as a COVID-19 cure, and had received a warning from the FDA for promoting it. Consuming colloidal silver over a long period of time can lead to blue-grey discoloration of the skin, as well as seizures and organ failure. An autopsy report released in December 2021 stated that Carlson had died from "global decline in the setting of alcohol abuse, anorexia, and chronic colloidal silver ingestion". The autopsy found no evidence that Carlson had cancer.

On May 5, Deputy District Attorney Alex Raines announced plans to upgrade the abuse of corpse charges to the more serious charge of tampering with a deceased human body, and the group members were reported to be facing a mix of charges of child abuse, abuse of a corpse, tampering with deceased human remains, and false imprisonment. The charges were later dropped.

Though the house and the group's bank accounts were in Lamboy's name, he was not charged in connection with the corpse. Lamboy reportedly emptied the group's bank account, which contained $330,000. Group members reported that they had not heard from Lamboy since April 28, 2021, and several news outlets have failed to locate him.

== Media appearances ==
Carlson appeared on Dr. Phil in 2020, where she spread her claims of being God and confronted her family.

Dateline NBC aired a two-hour documentary about the group on October 15, 2021.

The HBO documentary series Love Has Won: The Cult of Mother God, directed by Hannah Olson, premiered on November 13, 2023.

A book about Amy Carlson, Love Has Won, and the New Age leaders, called Blazing Eye Sees All: Love Has Won, False Prophets and the Fever Dream of the American New Age, was published by journalist Leah Sottile in March 2022.

== See also ==
- God complex
- List of people claimed to be Jesus
