= King Coal (film) =

2023 documentary film

- Directed by: Elaine McMillion Sheldon
- Written by: Logan Hill, Shane Boris, Heather Hannah
- Release date: 23 January 2023 (United States)
- Running time: 78 minutes
- Country: USA
- Language: English
- Box office: $54,051

King Coal is a 2023 documentary film about the culture around coal mining in Appalachia.

The film won the Nigel Moore Award for Youth Programming at the 2023 DOXA Documentary Film Festival.
