= Hannah Olson =

American documentary director and producer

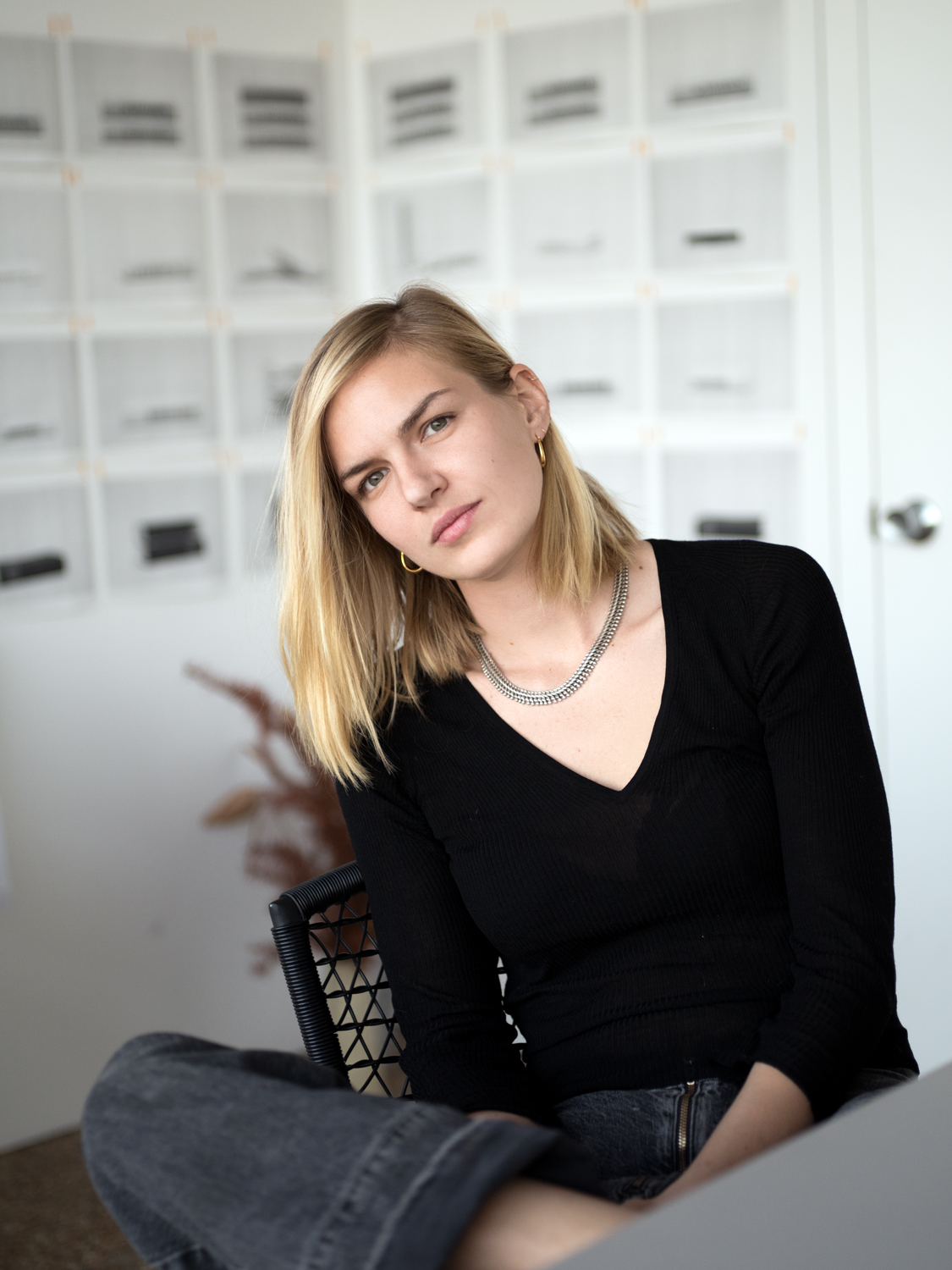
- Born: Minnetonka, Minnesota, U.S.
- Occupations: Director, producer
- Years active: 2015 – present

Hannah Olson is an American documentary film director and producer. She is best known for her work on the HBO documentaries, Baby God, The Last Cruise, and Love Has Won: The Cult of Mother God.

== Life and career ==
Olson was born in Minnetonka, Minnesota. She graduated from Hopkins High School and Brown University. In 2020, she made her directing debut with the documentary film, Baby God, about the investigation of Dr. Quincy Fortier. It premiered at South by Southwest and the Nantucket Film Festival.

Olson's second documentary film, The Last Cruise, was about the COVID-19 outbreak on the Diamond Princess. It premiered at South by Southwest.

In 2023, Olson directed the documentary series Love Has Won: The Cult of Mother God revolving around Love Has Won, and its leader Amy Carlson for HBO.

== Filmography ==
Year	Title	Contribution	Note
2015	Lidia Celebrates America	Producer	1 Episode
2016-2019	Finding Your Roots	Producer and director	24 Episodes
2018	American Experience	Producer	1 Episode
2018	City of Joel	Co-producer	Documentary
2020	Who Killed Malcolm X?	Story concept	Documentary
2020	Baby God	Director and producer	Documentary
2021	The Last Cruise	Director and producer	Documentary short
2023	Love Has Won: The Cult of Mother God	Director and executive producer	Documentary series

== Awards and nominations ==
Year	Result	Award	Category	Work	Ref.
2021	Nominated	South by Southwest	Best Documentary Short	The Last Cruise	
2021	Nominated	Critics' Choice Documentary Awards	Best Short Documentary	The Last Cruise	
2022	Nominated	Cinema Eye Honors Awards	Outstanding Achievement in Shorts List Films	The Last Cruise	
2022	Nominated	News and Documentary Emmy Awards	Outstanding Short Documentary	The Last Cruise	
