= Great New Orleans Fire =

Great New Orleans Fire may refer to:

- Great New Orleans Fire (1788)
- Great New Orleans Fire (1794)
