= Great Hotels =

- Written by: Samantha Brown
- Directed by: Sylvia Caminer; Sid Goldberg
- Starring: Samantha Brown
- Country of origin: United States
- Original language: English

Production
- Executive producers: Howard Lee; Jerry Smith; Cindy Smith
- Running time: 30 minutes

Original release
- Network: Travel Channel
- Release: January 1, 2001 – July 4, 2006

Related
- Passport to Europe; Passport to Latin America

Great Hotels is a television show on the Travel Channel. The show, hosted by Samantha Brown, travels around the United States to show some of its most renowned hotels. Brown stays at the hotel and walks the viewer through the layout, the rooms, and extra features the hotel has to offer that make it unique and desirable.

== Hotels ==
Below are some notable hotels that Great Hotels covered.

- Arizona Biltmore Hotel Resort & Spa, Phoenix, Arizona
- Auberge du Soleil, Napa County, California
- Bacara Resort and Spa, Santa Barbara, California
- Bellagio, Las Vegas, Nevada
- The Boulders, Carefree, Arizona
- The Breakers, Palm Beach, Florida
- The Broadmoor, Colorado Springs, Colorado
- Casa Monica Hotel, St. Augustine, Florida
- Casa Morada, Islamorada, Florida Keys, Florida
- The Chateau Marmont, Los Angeles, California
- The Chatham Bars Inn, Chatham, Massachusetts
- Disney's Animal Kingdom Lodge at Walt Disney World Resort
- Disney's Beach Club Resort at Walt Disney World Resort
- Disney's Fort Wilderness Campground at Walt Disney World Resort
- Disney's Grand Californian Hotel & Spa at Disneyland Resort, Anaheim, California
- Disney's Grand Floridian Resort & Spa at Walt Disney World Resort
- Disney's Wilderness Lodge at Walt Disney World Resort
- Disney's Yacht Club Resort at Walt Disney World Resort
- Daufuskie Island Resort, Hilton Head, South Carolina
- The Don CeSar Beach Resort, St. Pete Beach, Florida
- The Driskill, Austin, Texas
- The Fairmont San Francisco, San Francisco, California
- Four Seasons Hualalai, Hawaii
- Four Seasons Hotel Chicago, Chicago, Illinois
- Grand Wailea Resort, Hawaii
- Grove Isle Club and Resort, Coconut Grove, Miami, Florida
- The Hay–Adams Hotel, Downtown Washington D.C.
- The Homestead, Hot Springs, Virginia
- Hotel Biba, West Palm Beach, Florida
- Hotel Diva, San Francisco, California
- Hotel George, Downtown Washington D.C.
- Hotel Maison De Ville, New Orleans, Louisiana
- Hotel Monaco, Chicago, Illinois
- Hotel Palomar, San Francisco, California
- Hyatt Regency Grand Cypress, Orlando, Florida
- Hyatt Regency Hill Country Resort, Texas
- Hotel Serrano aka Hotel Californian (San Francisco, California), San Francisco, California
- Hotel Teatro, Denver, Colorado
- The Inn at Little Washington, Washington, Virginia
- The Inn at Montchanin Village, Montchanin, Delaware
- The Kahala Hotel & Resort, Oahu, Hawaii
- Omni La Mansion del Rio, San Antonio, Texas
- La Playa Beach & Golf Resort, Naples, Florida
- Le Pavillon Hotel, New Orleans, Louisiana
- The Hotel, South Beach, Florida
- The Hotel Hershey, Hershey, Pennsylvania
- The Library Hotel, New York City, New York
- The Lodge at Koele, Hawaii
- The Lodge at Vail, Vail, Colorado
- The Luxor, Las Vegas, Nevada
- Mandalay Bay, Las Vegas, Nevada
- The Manele Bay Hotel, Hawaii
- Inter-Continental Mark Hopkins Hotel, San Francisco, California
- Marshall House, Savannah, Georgia
- Meadowood, Napa Valley, California
- The Mission Inn Hotel & Spa, Riverside, California
- Mohonk Mountain House, New Paltz, New York
- Molokai Lodge, Maunaloa, Moloka'i, Hawaii
- Nine Zero Hotel, Boston, Massachusetts
- The Palmer House Hilton, Chicago, Illinois
- The Palms Casino and Resort, Las Vegas, Nevada
- Park Hyatt Beaver Creek, Colorado
- The Bellevue-Stratford Hotel (formerly a Park Hyatt) Bellevue, Pennsylvania
- Pelican Hotel, Miami, Florida
- The Peninsula Beverly Hills, Beverly Hills, California
- Plaza Hotel, New York, New York
- Portofino Bay Hotel, Orlando, Florida
- Princeville Hotel, Kauai, Hawaii
- The Renaissance Hollywood Hotel, Hollywood, California
- The Rittenhouse Hotel, Philadelphia, Pennsylvania
- Ritz-Carlton, Amelia Island, Florida
- Ritz-Carlton Half Moon Bay, Half Moon Bay, California
- Ritz-Carlton Naples, Naples, Florida
- Ritz-Carlton New Orleans New Orleans, Louisiana
- Royal Palms Resort and Spa, Phoenix, Arizona
- The Sagamore, Bolton Landing, New York
- San Jose Hotel, Texas
- Shutters on the Beach Hotel, Santa Monica, California
- The St. Regis, New York City, New York
- Monarch Beach Resort, Dana Point, California
- The Standard, Los Angeles, California
- Sunset Key Guest Cottages, Key West, Florida
- The Time New York, New York City, New York
- Turtle Bay Resort, Oahu, Hawaii
- The Venetian, Las Vegas, Nevada
- The Waldorf-Astoria, New York City, New York
- The Wauwinet, Nantucket, Massachusetts
- The Westin Savannah Harbor Golf Resort & Spa, Savannah, Georgia
- The Westin St. Francis, San Francisco, California
- Wheatleigh, Lenox, Massachusetts
- W. Honolulu, Honolulu, Hawaii
- W. San Diego, San Diego, California
- Willard Intercontinental, Washington D.C.

== Awards and nominations ==
Year	Result	Award	Category	Recipient(s)
2005	Nominated	Daytime Emmy Award	Outstanding Service Show	Howard Lee, Jerry Smith, Cindy Smith, Lori Rothschild Ansaldi, Joan McCord
2004	Won	Daytime Emmy Award	Outstanding Directing in a Service Show	Jerry Smith, Joan McCord, Sylvia Caminer, Sid Goldberg
2004	Nominated	Daytime Emmy Award	Outstanding Achievement in Single Camera Editing	David Dean, Chris Beavers, Zsolt Luka, Mitchell Smith
2004	Nominated	Daytime Emmy Award	Outstanding Achievement in Single Camera Photography	Stan Murphy
2004	Nominated	Daytime Emmy Award	Outstanding Service Show	Howard Lee, Jerry Smith, Cindy Smith, Joan McCord
2003	Nominated	Daytime Emmy Award	Outstanding Directing in a Service Show	Jerry Smith, Joan McCord, Sylvia Caminer, Sid Goldberg
