= The Social Dilemma =

2020 American docudrama film by Jeff Orlowski

- Promotional poster
- Directed by: Jeff Orlowski
- Written by: Davis Coombe; Vickie Curtis; Jeff Orlowski
- Produced by: Larissa Rhodes
- Starring: Tristan Harris; Aza Raskin; Jeff Seibert; Justin Rosenstein; Shoshana Zuboff; Jaron Lanier; Skyler Gisondo; Kara Hayward; Vincent Kartheiser; Anna Lembke
- Cinematography: John Behrens; Jonathan Pope
- Edited by: Davis Coombe
- Music by: Mark A. Crawford
- Production companies: Exposure Labs; Argent Pictures; The Space Program
- Distributed by: Netflix
- Release dates: January 26, 2020 (Sundance); September 9, 2020 (United States)
- Running time: 94 minutes
- Country: United States
- Language: English

The Social Dilemma is a 2020 American docudrama film directed by Jeff Orlowski and written by Orlowski, Davis Coombe, and Vickie Curtis. The documentary covers the negative social effects of social media and is interspersed by a dramatized narrative surrounding a family of five who are increasingly affected by problematic social media use.

The Social Dilemma premiered at the 2020 Sundance Film Festival, on January 26, 2020, and was released on Netflix on September 9, 2020, during the COVID-19 pandemic. It received generally favorable reviews from critics, who praised its message and use of interviews with established tech experts but criticized the narrative, reenactments, and lack of nuance in addressing technological problems.

== Synopsis ==
The Social Dilemma examines the impact of social media and technology platforms on users, focusing on persuasive design, data collection, and algorithmic prediction. The film argues that companies track and analyze users' online activity in order to build artificial intelligence systems that predict and influence behavior. In the documentary, Tristan Harris, a former Google design ethicist and co-founder of the Center for Humane Technology, says that tech companies pursue three primary goals:

1. The engagement goal: to increase usage and make sure users continue scrolling.
2. The growth goal: to ensure users are coming back and inviting friends, who invite even more friends.
3. The advertisement goal: to make sure that while the above two goals are happening, the companies are also making as much money as possible from advertisements.

Harris summed this up with the warning: "If you're not paying for the product, you are the product", paraphrasing earlier insights from Television Delivers People, Tom Johnson, and Andrew Lewis.

Another interviewee, Jonathan Haidt, a social psychologist at NYU Stern School of Business, brings up the concerns of mental health in relation to social media.

The film also discusses the dangers of fake news. Harris argues that this is a "disinformation-for-profit business model" and that companies make more money by allowing "unregulated messages to reach anyone for the best price".

In the end credits, the interviewees propose ways the audience can take action to fight back, such as turning off notifications, never accepting recommended videos on YouTube, using search engines that do not retain search history, and establishing rules in the house on cell phone usage.

=== Narrative ===
The documentary uses a fictional dramatized narrative to illustrate the issues discussed, centering around "a middle-class, average American family" whose members each interface with the internet differently: Ben, a teenager who falls deeper into social media addiction and online radicalization; Isla, an adolescent who develops depression and low self-esteem from social media's unrealistic beauty standards; Cassandra, an older teenager who does not have a mobile phone and is depicted as being free from online manipulation; and their mother and stepfather, who try to curb their children's screen time but do not fully understand the factors of the situation. The narrative depicts Ben and Isla as they are increasingly affected by social media and internet addictions, driven by the Engagement, Growth, and Advertisement AIs, represented by anthropomorphized tech executives in a "behind-the-screen" control room who find ways to keep their users as addicted to social media as possible while only viewing them as depersonalized avatars, with little concern for theirs or society's well-being.

The narrative starts with Isla ignoring her mother's requests to set the table, followed by her becoming depressed after her appearance is criticized on social media. After Cassandra criticizes Isla and Ben's problematic smartphone use, their mother proposes locking everyone's phones in a safe so they can have dinner together, but when one phone receives a notification, Isla tries to open the safe and ultimately breaks it open with a tool, damaging Ben's phone screen. In return for a new phone screen, Ben promises his mother he will not use his phone for a week, but the AIs, confused as to why he is suddenly inactive, draw him back in by sending him a notification that his ex has started a new relationship, prompting Ben to break his promise and doomscroll in an attempt to cope. The AIs begin recommending him radical centrist content to keep him engaged, which quickly devolve into propaganda and conspiracy theories by the anti-democratic "Extreme Center" movement, radicalizing Ben and affecting his daily life to the point of near-isolation. Ultimately, Ben attends an Extreme Center rally that escalates when similarly radicalized counter-protestors arrive. Cassandra learns Ben is there and searches for him, but both are detained by riot police. At the end of the narrative, the AIs merge into one entity while Ben's avatar becomes a human representation of himself, and they stare at each other.

== Cast ==
=== Interviewees ===
- Tristan Harris, former Google design ethicist, co-founder and CEO of Apture (2007), and co-founder of the Center for Humane Technology; co-host of the podcast Your Undivided Attention with Aza Raskin
- Tim Kendall, former director of monetization at Facebook, former president of Pinterest, and CEO of Moment (a mobile application that tracks screen time)
- Jaron Lanier, computer philosophy writer, computer scientist, visual artist, and composer of contemporary classical music; author of Ten Arguments for Deleting Your Social Media Accounts Right Now (2018)
- Roger McNamee, early investor at Facebook, author of Zucked: Waking Up to the Facebook Catastrophe (2019), and cofounder of the venture capital firm Elevation Partners
- Aza Raskin, former head of user experience at Mozilla Labs and creative lead for Firefox; co-founder of the Center for Humane Technology and founder of Massive Health; inventor of the infinite scroll
- Justin Rosenstein, former Facebook engineering manager, former Google product manager, and co-founder of Asana and One Project
- Shoshana Zuboff, Professor Emeritus at the Harvard Business School, author of The Age of Surveillance Capitalism (2019)
- Jeff Seibert, former head of product at Twitter, serial tech entrepreneur, and co-founder of Digits
- Anna Lembke, medical director of addiction medicine at Stanford University School of Medicine
- Jonathan Haidt, social psychologist at the New York University Stern School of Business, author of The Righteous Mind: Why Good People are Divided by Politics and Religion (2012) and coauthor of The Coddling of the American Mind: How Good Intentions and Bad Ideas Are Setting Up a Generation for Failure (2018)
- Sandy Parakilas, former platform operations manager at Facebook and former product manager at Uber
- Cathy O'Neil, data scientist and author of Weapons of Math Destruction (2016)
- Randima Fernando, former product manager at Nvidia, former executive director at Mindful Schools, and co-founder and executive director of the Center for Humane Technology
- Joe Toscano, former experience design consultant at Google and author of Automating Humanity (2018)
- Bailey Richardson, early team member of Instagram and partner at People & Company
- Rashida Richardson, assistant professor of law and political science at Northeastern University School of Law and former director of policy research at AI Now Institute
- Guillaume Chaslot, former software engineer at Google (YouTube) and founder of AlgoTransparency
- Renée DiResta, technical research manager at the Stanford Internet Observatory and former head of policy at Data for Democracy
- Cynthia M. Wong, former senior internet researcher at Human Rights Watch
- Alex Roetter, former senior vice president of engineering at Twitter
- Lynn Fox, former director of corporate PR and Mac PR at Apple, former executive of corporate communications at Google

=== Actors ===
- Skyler Gisondo as Ben
- Kara Hayward as Cassandra
- Sophia Hammons as Isla
- Chris Grundy as Stepdad
- Barbara Gehring as Mother
- Vincent Kartheiser as Artificial Intelligence
- Catalina Garayoa as Rebecca
- Sergio Villarreal as Luiz
- Laura Obiols as Vendetta
- Vic Alejandro as Police officer

Narrative casting was led by Jenny Jue.

== Themes ==
The Social Dilemma centers on the social and cultural impact of social media usage on regular users, with a focus on algorithmically enabled forms of behavior modification and psychological manipulation. The film depicts an array of related themes, including technological addiction, fake news, depression, and anxiety.

One interviewee, Tim Kendall, a former director of Facebook, spoke up on the alarming goal of the company: updating the app with increased addictiveness for a consistent boost in engagement. Another interviewee, Tristan Harris, former Google designer, compares the addiction level to a "Vegas slot machine" as users "check their phones hoping that they have a notification, as it's like they are pulling the lever of a slot machine hoping they hit the jackpot".

Misinformation and fake news are commonly spread on social media, and users are unable to distinguish between fake and real news, resulting in differences in ideology and societal division. The immersion of users in this app, who are thus exposed to limitless information, according to Kendall, could potentially lead to tension within society.

The Social Dilemma also discusses how social media can cause depression and give users anxiety. Jonathan Haidt, a social psychologist and author, highlights the influence of social media on depression and anxiety, especially in younger adolescents. The documentary reports statistics on depression, self-harm, and suicide leading to hospitalization, specifically in American teenage girls, resulting from social media use. The number of hospitalizations remained stable until around 2011 and rose a significant 62 percent in older teen girls (ages 15–19) and up 189 percent in younger teenage girls (ages 10–14) since 2009 in the US. The same pattern is shown in the rates of suicide, which had increased 70 percent in older teenage girls and 151 percent in younger teenage girls compared to 2001–2010. According to Haidt's interview, people born after 1996 have grown up in a society where social media usage is the norm, thus resulting in consistent exposure to overwhelming content from a young age.

== Production ==
=== Inspiration ===
Jeff Orlowski, who is mostly known for his work in Chasing Coral and Chasing Ice, began production on The Social Dilemma in 2018 and concluded it in 2019. When asked where his inspiration came from during the film's panel at Deadline Hollywood's Contenders Documentary event, Orlowski said that he has "always been curious about big systemic and societal challenges". He came to believe that "invisibly, a handful of designers in Silicon Valley are writing code that is shaping the lives of billions of people around the planet".

Orlowski, on the film's FAQ page, states:

We were drawn to tell the stories of our changing glaciers and changing coral reefs because they were powerful signs of a huge global issue facing humanity: climate change. When we started talking with Tristan Harris and the Center for Humane Technology, we saw a direct parallel between the threat posed by the fossil fuel industry and the threat posed by our technology platforms. Harris calls this "the climate change of culture", an invisible force that is shaping how the world gets its information and understands truth. Our hope has always been to work on big issues, and we now see the "social dilemma" as a problem beneath all our other problems.

The film's graphics, animation, and visual effects were made by Mass FX Media and produced by Netflix.

=== Soundtrack ===
The film's music is composed by Mark Crawford, "a Primetime Emmy-nominated composer and filmmaker" who was nominated for an ASCAP Award for his work on The Social Dilemma. With the use of "human-produced" and mechanical sounds, as Crawford explained in The Social Dilemma interview, he displayed the alarming impacts of social media through this soundtrack.

No.	Title	Length
1.	"Logos"	0:34
2.	"A Totally Normal World"	2:31
3.	"Am I Really That Bad"	0:49
4.	"Server Room"	3:45
5.	"A Call to Arms"	2:00
6.	"Manipulated"	2:28
7.	"Magic Tricks"	1:49
8.	"Hooked in the Classroom"	1:09
9.	"Growth Hacking"	1:44
10.	"Programmed at a Deeper Level"	1:29
11.	"Addicted"	1:44
12.	"Kitchen Safe"	0:53
13.	"Family Dinner"	0:57
14.	"The Kids Are Not Alright"	0:34
15.	"The Bet"	1:12
16.	"Perceptions of Beauty"	2:22
17.	"Theremin Lullaby"	1:30
18.	"Time Offline"	0:53
19.	"Hominid Brains"	2:12
20.	"The AIs Are Losing"	0:39
21.	"Machine Learning"	1:33
22.	"Late Night Snack"	0:52
23.	"Checkmate Humanity"	1:49
24.	"The Sliding Scale"	2:51
25.	"Exponential Hearsay"	3:54
26.	"Myanmar"	3:09
27.	"Caught in the Crowd"	4:37
28.	"Rapid Degration of Society"	3:16
29.	"Senate Hearing"	5:00
30.	"Justin Drops the Mic"	4:02
31.	"Shut It Down"	3:09
32.	"Welcome to the Drum Machine"	2:02
33.	"I Put a Spell on You"	2:53
Total length:		60:10

== Release ==
The Social Dilemma premiered at the 2020 Sundance Film Festival on January 26, 2020, and was released worldwide on Netflix on September 9, 2020. The documentary went on to be viewed in 38,000,000 homes within the first 28 days of release. It won two awards out of seven nominations at the 73rd Primetime Creative Arts Emmy Awards in 2021.

The film is approximately 94 minutes long and can only be accessed on Netflix. However, a free 40-minute version can be viewed by requesting it through the film's official webpage.

== Reception ==
=== Critical response ===
The Social Dilemma received generally positive reviews. On the review aggregator website Rotten Tomatoes, the film holds an approval rating of 85%, based on 66 reviews, with an average rating of 7.2/10. The website's critics consensus reads, "Clear-eyed and comprehensive, The Social Dilemma presents a sobering analysis of our data-mined present." On Metacritic, the film has a weighted average score of 78 out of 100, based on nine critics, indicating "generally favorable reviews".

Devika Girish from The New York Times gave the film a positive review, stating it was "remarkably effective in sounding the alarm about the incursion of data mining and manipulative technology into our social lives and beyond". Mark Kennedy of ABC News called the film "an eye-opening look into the way social media is designed to create addiction and manipulate our behaviour, told by some of the very people who supervised the systems at places like Facebook, Google, and Twitter". Nell Minow of RogerEbert.com noted that the film "asks fundamental and existential questions" of humanity's potential self-destruction through its own use of computer technology, and praised its "exceptional" use of confessions from leaders and key players in the social media industry.

Elizabeth Pankova of The New Republic noted "none of the information in the film is particularly new" but argued what made The Social Dilemma effective was "the purveyors of this information: the remorseful, self-aware warriors turned conscientious objectors of Silicon Valley". Pranav Malhotra of Slate stated the film "plays up well-worn dystopian narratives surrounding technology" and "depend[s] on tired (and not helpful) tropes about technology as the sole cause of harm, especially to children", while also failing to acknowledge activists and commentators who have long criticized social media, citing scholars such as Safiya Noble, Sarah T. Roberts, and Siva Vaidhyanathan. In an analysis of the film's persuasive techniques, Laura Alvarez Trigo of PopMecC stated, "The Social Dilemma manages to construct a Manichean narrative with a very elusive and misconstrued evil side" but pointed to the film's own resemblance to the propaganda and manipulation it criticizes, stating the film could have benefited from "providing the audience with the necessary tools to engage with the platforms that they use in a more critical way" and "a nuanced explanation of the present ethical problems [to] help people benefit from new technologies without having to completely shut them down or ban them for their teenage children".

Notable criticism was directed toward the fictional narrative surrounding the family and the AIs. Casey Newton at The Verge pointed to certain directorial decisions, such as "the ominous piano score that pervades every scene" as giving it "the feeling of camp". Nell Minow stated that "even the wonderfully talented Skyler Gisondo cannot make a sequence work where he plays a teenager seduced by extremist disinformation, and the scenes with Vincent Kartheiser embodying the formulas that fight our efforts to pay attention to anything outside of the online world are just silly." Pranav Malhotra called the narratives an "uncritical" presentation of a dystopia lacking nuance. In a rare defense of the film's oft-denounced dramatizations, John Naughton of The Guardian commented on the narrative's focus, stating that "the fictional strand is necessary because the biggest difficulty facing critics of an industry that treats users as lab rats is that of explaining to the rats what's happening to them while they are continually diverted by the treats (in this case dopamine highs) being delivered by the smartphones that the experimenters control."

=== Industry response ===
Facebook released a statement on its About page, stating that the film "gives a distorted view of how social media platforms work to create a convenient scapegoat for what are difficult and complex societal problems".

CNBC reported that social media users were doubting if they should continue using Facebook or Instagram after watching The Social Dilemma. However, when asked about the possibility of a decline in its users, Facebook refused to answer or give any comment on the subject.

Mozilla employees Ashley Boyd and Audrey Hingle noted that while the "making, release and popularity of The Social Dilemma represents a major milestone towards [the goal of] building a movement of internet users who understand social media's impact and who demand better from platforms", the film would have benefited from featuring more diverse voices.

=== Accolades ===
Award	Date of ceremony	Category	Recipient(s)	Result	Ref.
ACE Eddie Awards	April 17, 2021	Best Edited Documentary (Feature)	Davis Coombe	Nominated	
ASCAP Screen Music Awards	May 17, 2021	TV documentary Score of the Year	Mark A. Crawford	Nominated	
British Academy Film Awards	April 11, 2021	Best Documentary	Jeff Orlowski and Larissa Rhodes	Nominated	
BFE Cut Above Awards	March 5, 2021	Best Edited Single Documentary or Non-Fiction Programme	Davis Coombe	Won	
Boulder International Film Festival	March 8, 2020	Best Social Impact Film	The Social Dilemma	Won	
Chicago Film Critics Association Awards	December 21, 2020	Best Documentary	The Social Dilemma	Nominated	
Cinema Audio Society Awards	April 17, 2021	Outstanding Achievement in Sound Mixing for a Motion Picture – Documentary	Mark A. Crawford, Scott R. Lewis, Mark Venezia, and Jason Butler	Nominated	
Cinema Eye Honors Awards	March 9, 2021	Audience Choice Prize	The Social Dilemma	Nominated	
Cinema Eye Honors Awards	March 9, 2021	Outstanding Achievement in Graphic Design or Animation	Simon Barker, Matthew Poliquin, Matt Schultz, and Shawna Schultz	Nominated	
Critics' Choice Documentary Awards	November 16, 2020	Best Documentary Feature	The Social Dilemma	Nominated	
Critics' Choice Documentary Awards	November 16, 2020	Best Political Documentary	The Social Dilemma	Nominated	
Motion Picture Sound Editors Golden Reel Awards	April 16, 2021	Outstanding Achievement in Sound Editing – Feature Documentary	Richard Gould, James Spencer, and Andrea Gard	Nominated	
Primetime Emmy Awards	September 12, 2021	Outstanding Documentary or Nonfiction Special	Larissa Rhodes, Daniel Wright, and Stacey Piculell	Nominated	
Primetime Emmy Awards	September 12, 2021	Outstanding Directing for a Documentary/Nonfiction Program	Jeff Orlowski	Nominated	
Primetime Emmy Awards	September 12, 2021	Outstanding Writing for a Nonfiction Program	Vickie Curtis, Davis Coombe, and Jeff Orlowski	Won	
Primetime Emmy Awards	September 12, 2021	Outstanding Cinematography for a Nonfiction Program	John Behrens and Jonathan Pope	Nominated	
Primetime Emmy Awards	September 12, 2021	Outstanding Music Composition for a Documentary Series or Special (Original Dramatic Score)	Mark A. Crawford	Nominated	
Primetime Emmy Awards	September 12, 2021	Outstanding Picture Editing for a Nonfiction Program	Davis Coombe	Won	
Primetime Emmy Awards	September 12, 2021	Outstanding Sound Editing for a Nonfiction or Reality Program (Single or Multi-Camera)	Richard Gould, James Spencer, and Andrea Gard	Nominated	
San Diego Film Critics Society Awards	January 11, 2021	Best Documentary	The Social Dilemma	Runner-up	
St. Louis Film Critics Association Awards	January 18, 2021	Best Documentary Film	The Social Dilemma	Nominated	
Webby Awards	May 18, 2021	Advertising, Media & PR – Branded Content – Politics & Advocacy	Exposure Labs	Won	

== See also ==
- Algorithmic radicalization
- Body dysmorphic disorder
- Communal reinforcement
- Cyberpsychology
- Digital citizen
- Digital media use and mental health
- Doomscrolling
- Facebook–Cambridge Analytica data scandal
- False consensus effect
- Filter bubble
- Group polarization
- Persuasive technology
- Search engine manipulation effect
- Selective exposure theory
- Social dilemma
- Social media and psychology
- Surveillance capitalism
- Targeted advertising
