= Haunted Hotels =

- Also known as: America's Haunted Hotels
- Genre: Reality; Paranormal
- Written by: Nancy Gunn; Sarah Wetherbee; Bronwyn Barken; Curtis Colden
- Directed by: Emre Sahin
- Narrated by: Dan Riordan
- Composers: Donn Wilkerson; Wild Woods, Inc.
- Country of origin: United States
- Original language: English
- No. of seasons: 1
- No. of episodes: 13

Production
- Executive producers: Tom Rogan; Lauren Lexton; Howard Lee
- Producers: Sarah Weaterbee; Dana Landford; Kacey Camp; Nancy Gunn (sup. prod); Kari Olson (line prod)
- Editor: Jeffery Learned
- Camera setup: Single-camera
- Running time: 60 minutes
- Production company: Authentic Entertainment

Original release
- Network: Travel Channel
- Release: October 24, 2001 – June 3, 2005

Haunted Hotels (also called America's Haunted Hotels) is an American paranormal television series that premiered on October 24, 2001, on the Travel Channel. The series features haunted hotels in America and the ghost stories that are told from employees and guests alike who work and stay in them. They give their own personal accounts about encounters with the supernatural while working or visiting a particular hotel.

== Show Summary ==
The series is about ghostly goings-on in hotels across America (and in some episodes hotels in the United Kingdom and another one in France). Each hotel has a haunted history to it that leads the people from its past to stay behind. From ghosts that cause chills, and spirits that linger to poltergeists that move things around.

Each episode features different haunted hotels, motels, castles, and any overnight establishments in the United States and United Kingdom that leave its dark pasts behind for the living to experience for themselves. Dramatizations and special effects re-create true-life ghost stories from each haunted hotel.

== Series overview ==
Season	Episodes	Originally aired		DVD and Blu-ray release date		
Season	Episodes	Season premiere	Season finale	Region 1	Region 2	Region 4
1	13	October 24, 2001	June 3, 2005	—N/a	—N/a	—N/a

== Episodes ==
Ep. #	Episode Title	Original Airdate
1.1	Where Phantoms Lurk	October 24, 2001
Locations	T'Frere's House Bed and Breakfast, Lafayette, Louisiana; Horton Grand Hotel, San Diego, California; Kirkstone Pass Inn, Ambleside, Cumbria, England	
Overview	The series premiere features hauntings in hotels across America; a bed-and-breakfast in Louisiana and a hotel in San Diego, California, and also an English inn is being haunted by a ghost. Ghost stories include a slithering black apparition, the spirit of a young widow, the phantom of a brothel madam, a woman who was walled up alive, and the apparition of a pirate who returns to his former home.	
1.2	If Walls Could Speak	October 28, 2001
Locations	Hotel del Coronado, San Diego, California	
Overview	A hotel in San Diego where the restless spirit of a suicide victim roams the halls; a castle in Scotland haunted by the ghost of a murdered bride, and the ghost of choir singer haunts a California bed-and-breakfast that was formerly a church.	
1.3	The Ghosts Are Waiting	October 29, 2001
Locations	TBA	
Overview	A soul pines for lost love; lovers are involved in an unholy affair; and a ghost of a gothic prince. The episodes features stories of hauntings in California from San Diego, Ventura and Lake Arrowhead.	
1.4	Wandering Spirits	October 29, 2002
Locations	Snowball Mansion Inn, Knights Landing, California; The Shaker Inn, Enfield, New Hampshire; Le Meridien Selsdon Park Hotel, Sanderstead, England; Rutledge Victorian Guest House, Charleston, South Carolina; Korakia Bed and Breakfast, Palm Springs, California	
Overview	A northern California inn once known as "The White House of the West" holds a tragic ghost story about the original owners; the restless spirit of a murdered businessman haunts a New Hampshire inn; the jilted ghost of a lonely maid called the "Lady in Gray" haunts her secret lover's bedroom in an English mansion; a Victorian painted lady house in Charleston is haunted by the ghost of a little girl who died in a fire decades ago; and the ghost of a fashion model from the 1930s haunts a Palm Springs resort.	
1.5	Footsteps in the Night	October 29, 2002
Locations	The Inn at Shadow Lawn, Middletown, Rhode Island; Mount Washington Hotel and Resort, Bretton Woods, New Hampshire; The Berystede, Ascot, Berkshire, Windsor, England; Napa River Inn, Napa, California; The Forsyth Park Inn, Savannah, Georgia	
Overview	The spirit of a murderess lurks near the scene of the crime in Savannah, Georgia, an English lady's maid haunts the manor house in England where she met her fiery death, spectral lovers search for each other from beyond in Napa Valley.	
1.6	The Uninvited	October 29, 2002
Locations	TBA	
Overview	A haunted plantation; a bride who died on her wedding day roams the halls of a Connecticut inn; guests report strange experiences with the ghosts at a haunted plantation in Charleston, South Carolina, and the restless spirit of an English highwayman who was murdered long ago still stalks the road where he died and returns from the dead to kill again.	
1.7	When the Lights Go Out	October 13, 2003
Locations	Charleville Castle, Tullamore, County Offaly, Ireland; Colonial Inn, Concord, Massachusetts; Le Pavillon Hotel, New Orleans, Louisiana; Larkfield Priory Hotel, Aylesford, Maidstone, Kent County, England; Hotel Monte Vista, Flagstaff, Arizona	
Overview	The tragic death of a debutante's specter leads to a haunting in a luxurious hotel in New Orleans; near London, a guilt-ridden maid returns from the dead to seek redemption for her crimes; a colonial apparition haunts a historic Massachusetts inn.	
1.8	Out of the Shadows	October 27, 2003
Locations	The Lodge at Noyo River, Fort Bragg, California; Crowne Plaza Hotel, Edinburgh, Scotland; 1891 Castle Inn, New Orleans, Louisiana; Kinnitty Castle, Kinnitty, County Offaly, Ireland; Hassayampa Inn, Prescott, Arizona	
Overview	A lodge in California is visited by the spirits of two lovers who died long ago; a Scottish hotel's location on The Royal Mile (High Street) makes it a portal for plague victims buried beneath the lobby to rise from their graves; the ghost of a servant who died in a fire haunts a bed-and-breakfast in New Orleans' Garden District; a 1,500-year-old monk visits the Irish castle he once lived in; and a deserted bride still waits for her lover decades after her death in an Arizona inn.	
1.9	Where Spirits Speak	October 28, 2003
Locations	Langham Hilton Hotel, London, England; Whistler's Inn, Lenox, Massachusetts; Hotel Maison De Ville and The Audubon Cottages, New Orleans, Louisiana; Dornoch Castle Hotel, Dornoch, Sutherland, Scotland; The Queen Anne Hotel, San Francisco, California	
Overview	A murderous madman returns to the site of his deadliest deed in London; two ghostly sisters haunt a New England inn; two New Orleans hotels on the French Quarter are haunted by ghosts—one is visited by a lady in white while the other is guarded by a spectral soldier; a Scottish castle hotel holds a prisoner in its haunted dungeon; and Victorian charm and ghosts abound in a San Francisco hotel.	
1.10	Echoes of the Past	November 24, 2004
Locations	TBA	
Overview	A look at why ghosts haunt hotels and the guests and ghosts who just can't rest. Stories include; staff members being watched over by a ghostly owner, the unrequited love of a phantom house maid, ringing bells and footsteps are heard in a haunted church, and the apparition of a servant girl wreaks havoc in an Irish castle.	
1.11	Where Darkness Dwells	January 29, 2005
Locations	TBA	
Overview	The ghost of a philandering wife is seen wandering a hotel, Civil War soldiers who cannot rest in peace, spirits who flirt who hotel guests, and staff members and guests alike report witnessing the ghost of a builder who returns to inspect the hotel where he once worked.	
1.12	Lodging With Spirits	April 9, 2005
Locations	TBA	
Overview	Ghost stories include an inn with a flirtatious spirit, a ghostly lady of the night who appears in red, Scottish ghosts, the phantom of a little girl, long dead monks in Ireland, an unearthly lantern is seen floating in mid-air, and a glamorous spirit wanders a hotel's halls.	
1.13	Shadows of the Past	June 3, 2005
Locations	TBA	
Overview	This episode features ghostly children at an historic hotel in New Orleans, Louisiana, phantom pirates in Key West, Florida, and sailors who have returned from a watery grave to visit a hotel in Salem, Massachusetts.	

== See also ==
- Ghost hunting
- List of reportedly haunted locations
- Paranormal television

=== Similar TV Programs ===
- Celebrity Ghost Stories
- Ghost Adventures
- Ghost Hunters
- Ghost Hunters International
- Ghost Lab
- Ghost Stories (2009 TV series)
- Haunted Homes
- Haunted History
- Most Haunted
- Most Terrifying Places in America
- Scariest Places on Earth
