= New Orleans Fire Department =

Operational area
- Country: United States
- State: Louisiana
- City: New Orleans

Agency overview
- Established: December 15, 1891
- Employees: 656 (2014)
- Annual budget: $96,378,884 (2014)
- Staffing: Career
- Fire chief: Roman Nelson
- IAFF: 632

Facilities and equipment
- Battalions: 6
- Stations: 31
- Engines: 29
- Trucks: 6
- Squads: 2
- Rescues: 2
- Tenders: 2
- HAZMAT: 1
- Airport crash: 4
- Fireboats: 1
- Rescue boats: 2

Website
- Official website
- IAFF website

The New Orleans Fire Department provides fire protection and first responder emergency medical services to the city of New Orleans, Louisiana. The department serves 378,715 people living in a 350 square miles (910 km^{2}) area, including 170 square miles (440 km^{2}) of water.

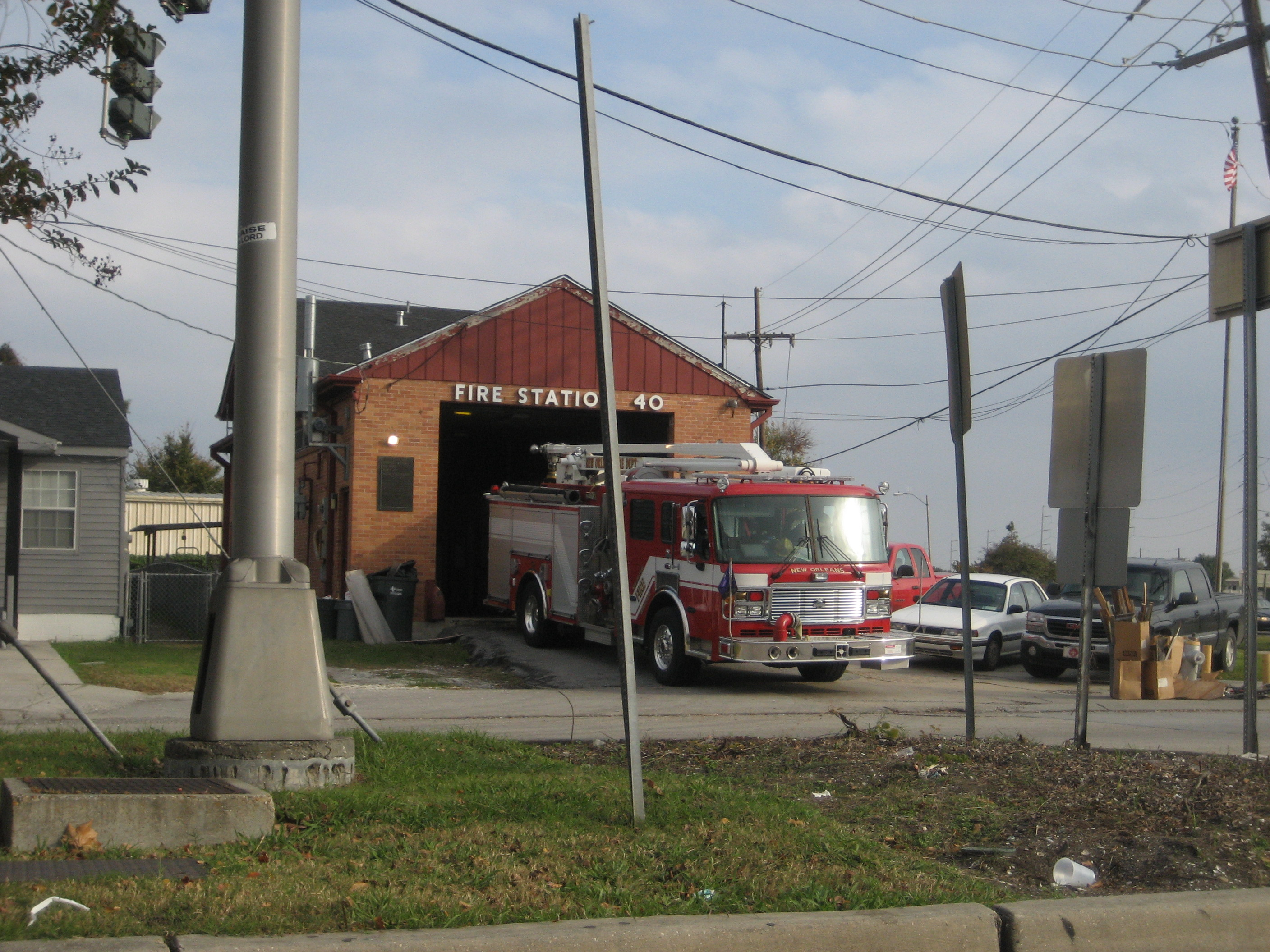
Fire Station 40 in the Algiers section of New Orleans

== History ==
Organized firefighting capability first arose in New Orleans as the Firemen's Charitable Association. Firefighting was handled by this volunteer body until the New Orleans Fire Department was created on December 15, 1891. Thomas O'Connor, who led the volunteers corps in its final days, stayed on to become the first chief of the newly-created department.

== Stations and apparatus ==
As of May 2015, below is a complete listing of all fire station and apparatus locations in the city of New Orleans, Louisiana.

Neighborhood	Engine Company or Squirt Company	Ladder Company	Special Unit	District Chief Unit	District
Irish Channel	Engine 1		EMS Support Unit		6
Central Business District	Engine 2		Rescue 2, Squad 2	District Chief 2	2
Eastern New Orleans	Engine 4				4
Gentilly	Engine 6				3
Tremé			Rescue 7, Squad 7, HazMat		2
Desire Area	Engine 8		Water Tender 3		3
Faubourg Marigny	Engine 9				3
Eastern New Orleans	Engine 10				4
Gentilly	Engine 12				3
Lakeview	Engine 13				5
Central Business District	Engine 14				2
Uptown	Engine 15				6
Central City	Squirt 16	Ladder 8			2
Algiers	Engine 17				8
Lakeview	Engine 18				5
Algiers Point	Engine 20				8
St. Bernard	Engine 21				5
Bywater	Engine 24				3
Carrollton	Engine 25	Ladder 7			6
Mid-City	Engine 26	Ladder 9		District Chief 5	5
Gentilly	Squirt 27	Ladder 11	Command Unit, Rescue Boat 27	District Chief 3	3
French Quarter	Engine 29				2
Venetian Isles	Engine 31		Water Tender 2, Rescue Boat 31		4
Algiers	Engine 33	Ladder 6			8
Mid-City	Engine 35				5
Eastern New Orleans	Engine 36	Ladder 13		District Chief 4	4
Eastern New Orleans	Engine 37				4
Uptown	Engine 38			District Chief 6	6
Lower Ninth Ward	Engine 39				3
Algiers	Engine 40			District Chief 8	8
Louis Armstrong New; Orleans International Airport			Fox 2, Fox 5, Fox 7, Fox 8		4
Michoud			Fireboat 805 "Blaze"		4

=== Disbanded Fire Companies ===
- Engine 3 - 1400 S. Broad Ave. - Disbanded 2005 Due to Hurricane Katrina
- Engine 5 - 1135 Washington Ave. (Now Supply Shop)
- Engine 7 - 1441 St. Peter St. - Disbanded 2013 to form Squad 7
- Engine 11 - 2312 Louisiana Ave. - Disbanded 1986
- Engine 19 - 2430 S. Carrollton Ave.
- Engine 22 - 2041 Egania St. - Disbanded 2005 Due to Hurricane Katrina
- Engine 23 - 1135 Washington Ave. - Disbanded 1991 (Now Fire Museum)
- Engine 28 - 4131 Elysian Fields Ave. - Disbanded 1986
- Engine 30 - 200 N. Alexander St. - Disbanded 1947
- Engine 32 - 7311 Chef Menteur Hwy. - Disbanded 1980
- Engine 34 - 2312 Louisiana Ave. - Disbanded 1986
- Engine 41 - 1400 S. Broad Ave. - Disbanded 1982
- Engine 42
- Engine 43 - 2041 Egania St. - Disbanded 1976
- Engine 44 - 1300 N. Galvez St. - Disbanded 1967
- Engine 46
- Engine 47 - 7311 Chef Menteur Hwy. - Disbanded 1976
- Snorkel 1 - 1040 Poland Ave. - Disbanded 1975
- Ladder 1 - 5600 Franklin Ave.
- Ladder 2 - 200 S. Robertson St. - Disbanded 2013
- Ladder 3 - 4500 Old Gentilly Rd. - Disbanded 2013
- Ladder 4 - 1040 Poland Ave. - Disbanded 2013
- Ladder 5 - 1211 Arabella St. - Disbanded 2013
- Ladder 10 - 2312 Louisiana Ave. - Disbanded 1986
- Ladder 12 - 987 Robert E. Lee Blvd.
- Ladder 15 - 1040 Poland Ave. - Disbanded 1982
- Rescue 1 - 1131 Dumaine St. - Disbanded 1976
- Emergency 1 - 1441 St. Peter St. - Disbanded 1980
- Flying Squad - 801 Girod St. - Disbanded 2013 to form Rescue 2
- Rescue Squad - 1441 St. Peter St. - Disbanded 2013 to form Rescue 7
- Salvage 1 - 1300 N. Galvez St. - Disbanded 1986
- 1st District Chief
- 7th District Chief

== Notable incidents ==
=== Hurricane Katrina ===
Hurricane Katrina made landfall in Louisiana on August 29, 2005. The effects of Hurricane Katrina in New Orleans included 1,464 deaths, 80% flooding of the city, and many burned buildings.

== See also ==
- Great New Orleans Fire (1788) - The first of two large fires in New Orleans that occurred before the New Orleans Fire Department came into existence.
- Great New Orleans Fire (1794) - The second large fire.
