= Seal of New Orleans =

Official insignia for the city

- Armiger: New Orleans, Louisiana
- Adopted: 2018 (current form)
- Earlier version: Many starting from 1852

The seal of New Orleans is the official insignia representing the city of New Orleans, located in the state of Louisiana.

The first version of the arms was made in 1852 following the merger of the three municipalities that made up New Orleans. It was modified throughout the 20th and 21st century to alter the individuals, colours and form on the seal.

== History ==
The early history of the seal is obscure. Based on the New Orleans Public Library, it is known that on February 17, 1805 the Legislative Council of the Territory of Orleans authorized the mayor to procure and use a seal on official acts and documents. But when the city was divided into three municipalities in 1836, each subdivision adopted a seal of its own. When the city was reunited in 1852, the seal was adopted.

According to records in the New Orleans City Hall Archives, official documents show that Mayor A. D. Crossman of New Orleans in June 1852 was authorized by the Council to order a City seal which was engraved and printed for the sum of 16 dollars. In 1871, a die of the seal adopted in 1852 was approved by Mayor J. R. Conway and was cast for the sum of 60 dollars. In 1873, an exact reproduction of the seal was entered according to an act of Congress. The latest official records concerning the seal in the New Orleans Archives dated to 1929. The seal was modified throughout the 20th century by altering the individuals, colours and form on the seal. In 2018, the right supporter was changed to be of a darker skin.

=== Seal evolution ===
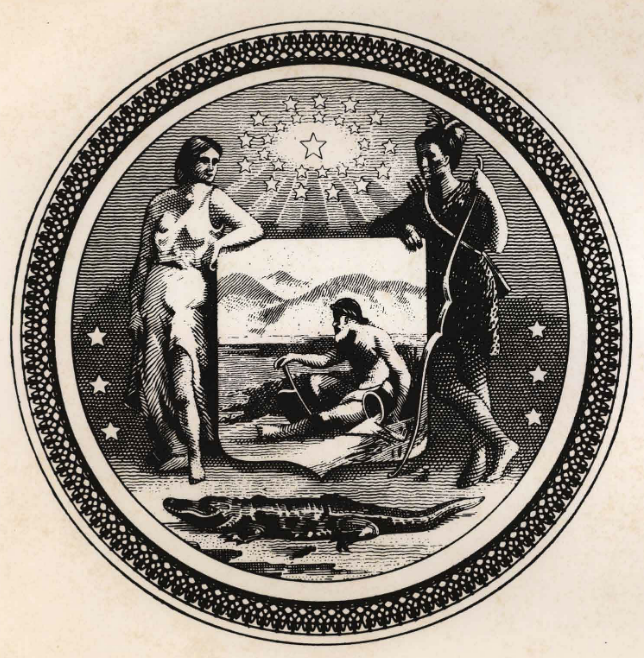
c. 1852

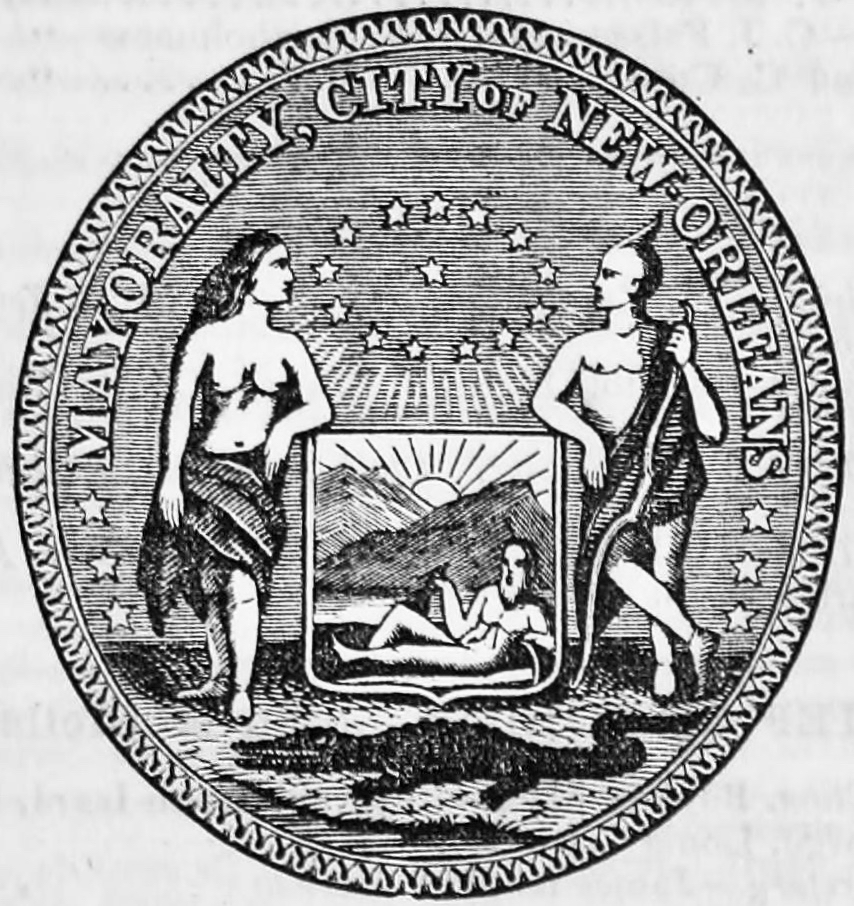
c. 1861

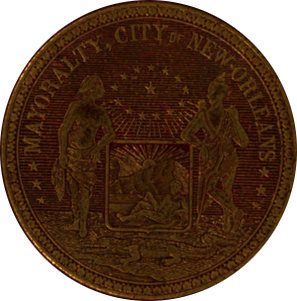
c. 1870

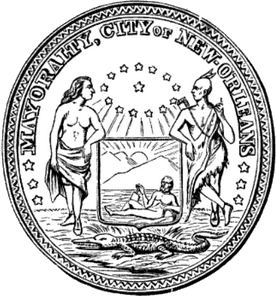
c. 1882

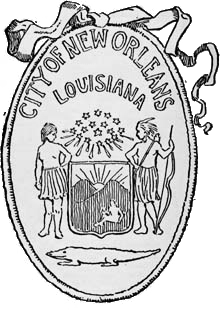
c. 1912

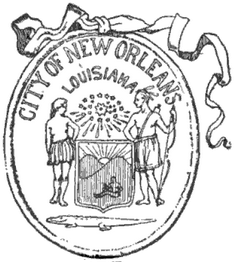
c. 1917

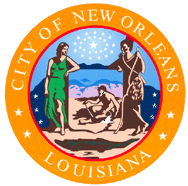
1938-2018

== Design ==
A description and explanation of its symbolism is lacking. However, a 1938 New Orleans City Guide describes the seal as follows:

Below and partly within the semicircular inscription 'City of New Orleans' an Indian brave and maiden stand on each side of the shield, upon which a recumbent nude figure is shown saluting the sun rising above mountains and sea. Above the shield are twenty-five circularly grouped stars, and below, an alligator.

— 1938 New Orleans City Guide

== Usage ==
According to city ordinance in 1870, the seal can be used by the mayor on copies of documents, by the city attorneys and several courts. The seal of the City of New Orleans is featured prominently across Orleans Parish, from the patches worn by New Orleans Police Department officers to the office of the mayor and the City Council chambers. The seal can also be seen on the badges of the New Orleans Fire Department, on buildings in downtown New Orleans and a plaque on the Algiers Point Library.

== Bibliography ==
- Powell, Lawrence: New Orleans City Guide 1938 Boston: Garrett County Press 2009. 2nd edition
