= Davis Coombe =

American documentary director, writer, editor and producer

- Born: Denver, Colorado, United States
- Occupations: Editor, writer, producer, director
- Years active: 1999 – present

Davis Coombe is an American documentary film editor, writer, producer and director. He is best known for his work on The Social Dilemma, Casting JonBenet, Chasing Coral, and the Oscar-winning short Saving Face. He is a member of the Academy of Motion Picture Arts and Sciences.

== Filmography ==
Year	Title	Contribution	Note
2005	Big Blue Bear	Co-director, editor and cinematographer	Documentary
2006	When I Hear Thunder	Editor	Documentary
2007	Iron Ladies of Liberia	Editor	Documentary
2008	Wesley Willis's Joyrides	Editor and producer	Documentary
2008	They Killed Sister Dorothy	Editor	Documentary
2008	Come Back to Sudan	Editor	Documentary
2008	No Strings	Editor	Documentary
2009	The Last Campaign of Governor Booth Gardner	Editor, producer and cinematographer	Documentary
2012	Chasing Ice	Editor	Documentary
2012	Saving Face	Editor and producer	Documentary
2012	Bay of All Saints	Producer	Documentary
2014	Keep on Keepin' On	Writer, editor and producer	Documentary
2014	A Lego Brickumentary	Writer, editor and co-producer	Documentary
2014	Fight Church	Co-producer	Documentary
2015	Being Evel	Writer, editor and co-producer	Documentary
2015	Rolling Papers	Editor	Documentary
2017	Chasing Coral	Writer and editor	Documentary
2017	Liyana	Editor and producer	Documentary
2017	Casting JonBenet	Editor	Documentary
2020	The Rescue List	Writer, editor and producer	Documentary
2020	Silent Rose	Editor	Feature film
2020	The Social Dilemma	Writer and editor	Documentary

== Awards and nominations ==
Year	Result	Award	Category	Work	Ref.
2010	Nominated	International Documentary Association	Distinguished Short Documentary	The Last Campaign of Governor Booth Gardner	
2012	Nominated	International Documentary Association	Best Short	Saving Face	
2013	Won	News & Documentary Emmy Award	Best Documentary	Saving Face	
2013	Won	News & Documentary Emmy Award	Outstanding Editing: Documentary and Long Form	Saving Face	
2013	Nominated	News & Documentary Emmy Award	Outstanding Science and Technology Programming	Saving Face	
2021	Nominated	American Cinema Editors	Best Edited Documentary - Feature	The Social Dilemma	
2021	Won	BFE Cut Above Awards	Best Edited Single Documentary	The Social Dilemma	
