= Zsolt Luka =

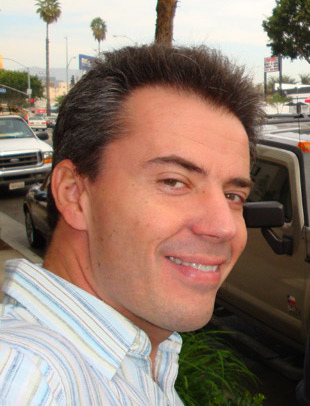
- Born: Zsolt Luka; June 10, 1969 (age 57); Cluj, Romania
- Occupations: Television director, editor, Videographer, Producer
- Years active: 1997 – present

Zsolt Luka (born June 10, 1969 in Cluj, Romania) is a television director, editor, videographer and producer. He is best known for his role in the reality show Around the World For Free.

== Career ==
His TV career began in the mid-1990s working as an editor on Canadian children's shows like Popular Mechanics for Kids and Mystery Hunters. He started directing in 2002 on Mystery Hunters and continued with children's shows such as Prank Patrol, usually editing his own work. He also edited Great Hotels, Passport to Europe and other travel-oriented shows for the Travel Channel in the early 2000s.

In 2007, together with partners Alex Boylan and Burton Roberts, Luka launched Around the World For Free and set off on a trip around the globe, from September 18 to February 23, 2008. Luka directed, filmed and edited the online series on the fly (once, in a butcher shop with newly slaughtered pigs hanging behind him), producing eight hours of edited content for the online audience. The program had a loyal following that even included schoolchildren, who welcomed the travelers back at the end of the journey during a visit to their school. The online project was re-packaged for television by Luka and sold to WGN America who began broadcasting in spring 2009.

Luka undertook a smaller online/broadcast hybrid project mirrored on the same model for Rachael Ray in the summer of 2008 called Rach to the Rescue.

On July 26, 2010, Luka reprised his role of producing, directing and editing the second season of Around the World For Free, this time for CBS.com, with new host Jeff Schroeder of Big Brother 11 and The Amazing Race 16 fame, and major sponsors AT&T and American Airlines attached. They set off from The Early Show on a 105-day journey around the world, with Luka filing popular webisodes (over 7 million video streams and 4 million page views ) from thirteen countries visited. Only one week after wrapping the show on November 4, 2010, Around the World For Free won both "Best Video Series/Show" and also "Best of Show" at the inaugural Diva Awards in New York City.

Luka's charity efforts include in-kind donated videos for organizations such as the Cambodian Red Cross.

== Awards/nominations ==
Luka was nominated for the Canadian Gemini Award in editing a few times for various works. He received an Emmy nomination for his work in Great Hotels
