= Anna Lembke =

American psychiatrist

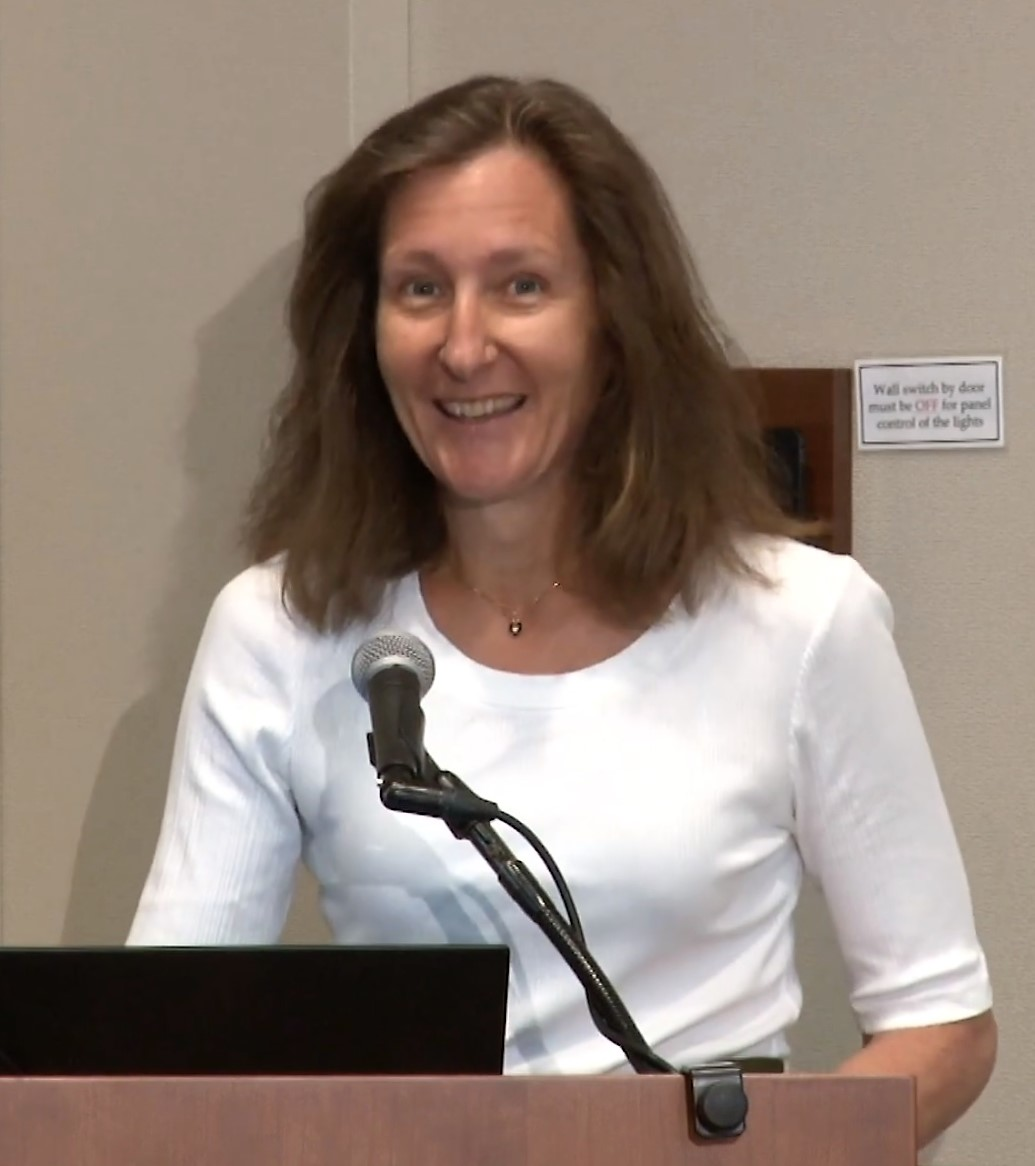
- Lembke speaking at Stanford University (2019)
- Born: November 27, 1967 (age 58)
- Education: Yale University (BA); Stanford University (MD)
- Known for: Addiction medicine
- Scientific career
- Fields: Psychiatry
- Workplaces: Stanford University
- Website: https://www.annalembke.com

Anna Lembke (born November 27, 1967) is an American psychiatrist practicing in the field of addiction medicine who is chief of the Stanford Addiction Medicine Dual Diagnosis Clinic at Stanford University. She is a specialist in the opioid epidemic in the United States and the author of Drug Dealer, MD, How Doctors Were Duped, Patients Got Hooked, and Why It’s So Hard to Stop. Her book, Dopamine Nation: Finding Balance in the Age of Indulgence, was released in August 2021 and became a New York Times bestseller.

Lembke appeared in the 2020 Netflix documentary The Social Dilemma.

Her work has been discussed in major media outlets, including The New York Times and NPR, in relation to contemporary discussions of addiction and compulsive behavior.

== Early life and education ==
Lembke was an undergraduate student at Yale University and earned a B.A. in humanities in 1989. She earned an M.D. at Stanford University School of Medicine in 1995 and completed a residency in psychiatry, also at Stanford, in 1998. She interned at the Alameda County Highland Hospital, specializing in adult psychiatry and addiction. She was board certified in 2003.

== Research and career ==
At Stanford University School of Medicine, Lembke is professor and medical director of addiction medicine. She is program director of the Stanford Addiction Medicine Fellowship. She also is chief of the Stanford Addiction Medicine Dual Diagnosis Clinic, whose mission is to support patients with substance use disorders, behavioral addictions, and co-occurring psychiatric disorders.

Lembke wrote the popular science book, Drug Dealer, MD. Her clinical research has received numerous awards. She has published more than a hundred professional papers, authored many commentaries and book chapters, traveled around the United States giving lectures, and delivered expert testimony to legislators. She delivered a TED talk on the opioid epidemic and pain management at TEDx Stanford. In 2021, Lembke published Dopamine Nation: Finding Balance in the Age of Indulgence, which explores addiction and the relationship between pleasure and pain in a society with ready access to rewarding substances and behaviors. Her next book, Radical Surrender: Letting Go in a World Addicted to Control, is to be published in November 2026. In her new book, Lembke argues that modern life has an unhealthy need for control.

Lembke has studied addiction in relation to substances such as drugs and alcohol, but she has taken special interest in addictions to smartphones and other technology. Lembke believed COVID-19 brought on a cultural shift that not only increased awareness towards addiction as a whole, but specifically in regards to digital and social media. Although smartphone and technology "addictions" are not currently recognized as formal clinical disorders in the Diagnostic and Statistical Manual of Mental Disorders (DSM-5) or in the International Classification of Diseases (ICD-10 and ICD-11), Lembke believes that smartphones are not only addictive on their own, but she purports that smartphones may exacerbate the problems of other addiction behaviors by increasing access and social contagion. Lembke believes that digital media, like video games or online pornography, can create the same dopamine release as drug or alcohol use which reinforces the behavior. Lembke appeared in the 2020 Netflix docudrama The Social Dilemma, in which she argued that "social media is a drug" that exploits the brain's evolutionary need for interpersonal connection. Lembke's children also appeared in the film, and family members commented that they believe most people significantly underestimate their screen time. Lembke argues that dopamine is important to the brain, but drugs (including digital media usage) short-circuits the process to receiving dopamine. She appears on Dr. Peter Attia's podcast to explain these concepts in depth.

While Dr. Lembke's perspective from an addictions standpoint is clear, other neuroscientists worry that her strictly anti-dopamine stance inadvertently gives the message that some medications for ADHD are overused, or should not be used at all, in contradiction to established scientific evidence.

== Select publications ==
- Lembke, Anna (2012-10-25). "Why Doctors Prescribe Opioids to Known Opioid Abusers". New England Journal of Medicine. 367 (17): 1580–1581. doi:10.1056/NEJMp1208498. ISSN 0028-4793. PMID 23094719.
- Lembke, Anna (2016). Drug Dealer, MD | Johns Hopkins University Press Books. jhupbooks.press.jhu.edu. doi:10.56021/9781421421407. ISBN 9781421421414.
- Lembke, Anna; Papac, Jennifer; Humphreys, Keith (2018-02-22). "Our Other Prescription Drug Problem". The New England Journal of Medicine. 378 (8): 693–695. doi:10.1056/NEJMp1715050. ISSN 1533-4406. PMID 29466163.
- Lembke, Anna. Dopamine Nation: Finding Balance in the Age of Indulgence (2021). Penguin Publishing Group. ISBN 9781524746728.
