= Alex Boylan =

American television personality

Alex Boylan (born February 25, 1977) is an American reality TV contestant, TV show host and producer. He first came to public attention as part of the winning team, together with his friend Chris Luca, in the second season of the reality TV show The Amazing Race in 2002. He was later involved in various TV projects such as Around the World for Free and Animal Attractions Television.

== Early life ==
Alex Boylan grew up in Georgetown, Massachusetts. When he was sixteen, he spent a year playing semi-pro soccer for the club "Campinesse" in Campina Grande, Brazil. He was a student at Jacksonville University studying International Business on a soccer scholarship. During his time in Jacksonville, Boylan played soccer where he helped the team win the conference tournament while making a run to the NCAA Division 1 Sweet Sixteen. He graduated from Jacksonville University with a B.S. in International Business. He worked as a bartender before joining The Amazing Race.

== The Amazing Race ==
in January 2002, Boylan competed on the second season of the CBS adventure reality show The Amazing Race with his lifelong friend, Chris Luca. The two reached the final leg of the race and won.

== Career ==
After winning The Amazing Race, Boylan went on to work for the production company PineRidge Film and Television. During this time, he hosted numerous television shows, including At the Chef’s Table (2004), a food series on PBS. In 2005 and 2006 Boylan hosted Health Corner’s, What’s Cooking with Alex, and Animal Attractions.

Boylan created and produced the DVD series Dropping In: Panama and Dropping In: El Salvador. Both documentaries follow surfers as they traverse lands in search of the perfect wave.

In 2006, Boylan partnered with Burton Roberts to create Around The World Productions, a production company which has produced hundreds of hours of interactive content. In their interactive series directed by Zsolt Luka, Around the World for Free, Boylan showed how one can travel around the world for free using only social media. Other shows include Jeff and Jordan Do America, the Buzz Tour for CBS, Rach to the Rescue for The Rachael Ray Show, Tales from the Trail for The Boy Scouts of America, Missions in Action, and destination content pieces for Travel Channel and Lonely Planet.

Boylan joined CBS This Morning as an adventure correspondent. He was also a guest host for VH1's Big Morning Buzz Show as well as a travel host for The CBS Buzz Tour. He has travelled to over 55 countries around the world. He is a co-founder of a website DreamJobbing.com.

Boylan hosts and produces The College Tour, a TV series telling the story of colleges and universities around the world.
