= Around the World for Free =

- Intertitle
- Genre: Reality television
- Created by: Alex Boylan; Zsolt Luka; Burton Roberts
- Directed by: Zsolt Luka
- Presented by: Alex Boylan (season 1); Jeff Schroeder (season 2); Parvati Shallow (season 3)
- Country of origin: United States
- Original language: English
- No. of seasons: 3
- No. of episodes: 45 (list of episodes)

Production
- Executive producers: Burton Roberts; Alex Boylan

Original release
- Network: Previous WGN America, Current CBS
- Release: April 16, 2009 – October 14, 2011

Around the World for Free a.k.a. ATWFF was an online/broadcast hybrid reality television series based on the concept of whether a person can circle the globe without any money. The show followed a reality star, as he or she attempted to travel around the world without any money on hand. The star travelled with one cameraman Zsolt Luka and relied on local guides and inhabitants for basic needs.

The concept was created by Alex Boylan, Emmy-nominated editor and director Zsolt Luka, and Burton Roberts, who was also the producer of Camp Reality and was a cast member on Survivor: Pearl Islands. The project was self-financed and self-produced by the trio after major networks and online portals passed on it.

== Season 1 ==
The first iteration of the project was hosted by Alex Boylan. He traveled around the world without any money and was aided in his quest by a social networking site created for this purpose. Alex was accompanied by Zsolt Luka who directed, filmed and edited the series on an ongoing basis. Executive Produced by Alex Boylan, Burton Roberts and Co-Executive Produced by Andrew Bishop, the first production season started on September 18, 2007, from midtown Manhattan and a kick-off on the CBS The Early Show morning talk show and ended back in New York City on the same program on February 23, 2008. During the production there were bi-weekly live on-air feeds to the Early Show from the field, but there was no formal affiliation between CBS and ATWFF.

Relying on strangers' kindness, Boylan and Luka visited 16 countries including the United States, Puerto Rico, US Virgin Islands, British Virgin Islands, Dominica, Trinidad and Tobago, Venezuela, Colombia, Ecuador, Peru, Chile, South Africa, Tanzania, Kenya, India, Thailand, Cambodia, and Vietnam on four continents over a period of 159 days and logged 45,000 miles.

The 6-month journey was documented on the Internet in 155 webisodes. They filmed 250 hours of high-definition video during the journey. The production company approached various networks until selling the project to WGN America.

In April 2009, WGN America started airing an 11-part TV version of the project in prime time. In July 2009 Sony Entertainment Television (South Africa) brings the show to Nigeria, Kenya, Uganda, Ghana, Tanzania, Namibia, Botswana, Zambia, Mozambique, Lesotho, and Zimbabwe.

== Season 2 ==
On June 8, 2010. Alex Boylan announced that season 2 would start filming that summer with a new host, Big Brother and The Amazing Race alum Jeff Schroeder. CBS interactive obtained the rights to the show and was green lit by Joe Ferreira as CBS Interactive's Executive Producer. Jeff was accompanied on his trek by season one director/editor Zsolt Luka, Josh Bolton (videographer/editor) and John Graham (videographer/editor). The ATWFF Season 2 team visited 13 countries including the United States, Japan, South Korea, Cambodia, Laos, Thailand, India, Romania, Italy, Germany, Netherlands, Belgium, and the United Kingdom.

== Season 3 ==
On June 24, 2011, it was announced that Parvati Shallow from reality show Survivor would host. Shallow has visited 12 countries, including United States, Haiti, Dominican Republic, Barbados, Guyana, Brazil, Argentina, South Africa, Namibia, Botswana, Zambia and Kenya. Her 100-day journey commenced on July 7, 2011 and ended on October 14, 2011.
