= Casting JonBenet =

2017 American documentary film

- Netflix release poster
- Directed by: Kitty Green
- Produced by: Kitty Green; Scott Macaulay; James Schamus
- Cinematography: Michael Latham
- Edited by: Davis Coombe
- Music by: Nathan Larson
- Production companies: Forensic Films; Symbolic Exchange; Meridian Entertainment
- Distributed by: Netflix
- Release dates: January 22, 2017 (Sundance); April 28, 2017; (Netflix)
- Running time: 80 minutes
- Countries: Australia; United States
- Language: English

Casting JonBenet is a 2017 documentary film about the death of JonBenét Ramsey and the large impact it left behind. The film was directed by Kitty Green.

== Synopsis ==
Casting JonBenet documents the casting process for the re-enactments in the documentary. Various Colorado-area actors are interviewed and tested for the roles of real people involved in the case, including John and Patsy Ramsey, Burke Ramsey, John Mark Karr and Boulder police officials. During the process, the would-be actors, dressed as the individuals they are auditioning for, reveal their emotions about the case and offer their own speculations. Rather than documenting the crime, the film observes how the events have become a point of pop-cultural obsession and conspiracy.

== Release ==
The film premiered in January 2017 at the Sundance Film Festival. Netflix gained the rights to distribute Casting JonBenet, and began streaming it on April 28, 2017.

== Reception ==
Casting JonBenet received positive reviews upon release. On review aggregator website Rotten Tomatoes, the film holds an approval rating of 81%, based on 47 reviews, and an average rating of 7.3/10. The website's critical consensus reads, "Casting JonBenét's unorthodox approach to its genre sets it apart in a crowded field, making for a uniquely thought-provoking true crime documentary hybrid." On Metacritic, it holds a rating of 74 out of 100, based on 14 reviews, indicating "generally favorable" reviews.
