= Center for Humane Technology =

Nonprofit organization

- Abbreviation: CHT
- Formation: 2018 (8 years ago)
- Founder: Tristan Harris; Aza Raskin; Randima (Randy) Fernando
- Type: Public charity
- Registration no.: 82-3492182
- Legal status: 501(c)(3) organization
- Purpose: To align technology with humanity's best interests.
- Headquarters: San Francisco, California, United States
- Fields: Technology ethics; AI alignment
- Revenue: $3,600,000 (2024)
- Disbursements: $395,000 (2024)
- Expenses: $6,300,000 (2024)
- Staff: 17 (2024)
- Volunteers: 5 (2024)
- Website: humanetech.com

The Center for Humane Technology (CHT) is a nonprofit organization dedicated to applying and encouraging ethics in consumer-facing technology, including social media. It claims many issues stem from the modern technology industry, which it says includes internet addiction, mental health issues, political extremism, political polarization, and misinformation.

Launched in 2018, the organization gained greater awareness after its involvement in the Netflix original documentary The Social Dilemma, which examined how social media's design and business model manipulates people's views, emotions, and behavior and causes addiction, mental health issues, harms to children, disinformation, polarization, and more. The film was watched by 38 million households in its first month, making it the second-most watched documentary on Netflix.

== Background ==
In 2013, Tristan Harris, then a design ethicist at Google, released a viral presentation titled "A Call to Minimize Distraction & Respect Users' Attention", a warning about the enormous power tech platforms have over users' attention spans. Harris urged companies to take this responsibility seriously.

A year later at TEDx Brussels, Harris introduced "Time Well Spent", a concept co-created with James Williams and Joe Edelman arguing that technology should be designed in line with users' basic human needs and values, rather than maximizing their time on their devices.

In December 2015, Tristan Harris left his position at Google to focus on alerting the public to the consequences of Silicon Valley's race for attention and culture of growth at all costs.

In 2017, Harris was interviewed for the 60 Minutes episode "Brain Hacking" to discuss how social media companies hijack biology. "Every time I check my phone, I'm playing the slot machine to see, 'What did I get?' This is one way to hijack people's minds and create a habit, to form a habit", Harris said. Later that year, Harris shared his expanded thoughts on the problems with social media platforms and how a handful of companies control billions of minds at TED 2017.

Building on this momentum and recognizing the need for an organization in this space, Tristan Harris, Aza Raskin, and Randima (Randy) Fernando founded the Center for Humane Technology in 2018 to educate the public, advise legislators, train technologists, and more.

== Activities ==
The organization encourages designers and companies to create systems with non-addictive features. There are multiple ways that technology companies try to maximize the use of their products: by using an intermittent variable reward system, causing people to fear missing something important, increasing the desire for social approval, strengthening the need to reciprocate others' gestures, and interrupting individuals' daily activities to alert them of a notification. Harris claims that technology parallels slot machines, in that both use intermittent variable rewards to increase addiction. According to Harris, companies have a responsibility to reduce this effect, through techniques such as increasing the predictability of their designs and eliminating the intermittent variable reward system all together.

CHT utilizes various mainstream media campaigns and resources, such as their podcast Your Undivided Attention and the documentary The Social Dilemma. The organization also aims to influence tech industry culture and practices through training and educational resources, working groups, and advising executives. In 2022, CHT launched the "Foundations of Humane Technology" course directed at supporting technologists and product leaders who are seeking to build more humane technology. As of June 2022, the course had 10,000 participants globally.

Additionally, CHT briefs policymakers to support the creation of the policy architecture that promotes the regulation of technology. Notably, Harris has testified in front of the U.S. Congress in regards to the risks of online deception and the manipulative tactics employed by social media platforms.

== Impact ==
In a 2018 post, Facebook CEO Mark Zuckerberg described feeling a "responsibility to make sure our services aren't just fun to use, but also good for people's well-being", announcing "a major change to how we build Facebook" so that time spent on the site is "time well spent". It has been suggested that this is an allusion to the Time Well Spent movement, and spurred similar initiatives, such as Apple's Screen Time and Google Digital Wellbeing.

In 2019, CHT launched Your Undivided Attention. The podcast has featured guests such as historian Yuval Harari, Taiwanese Digital Minister Audrey Tang, and Nobel Peace Prize winner Maria Ressa. The podcast has been downloaded 10 million times as of November 2021 and is among the most popular technology podcasts.

In 2020, CHT co-founders Tristan Harris, Aza Raskin, and Randima Fernando were featured in the Netflix documentary The Social Dilemma. Following the documentary's debut, Apple CEO Tim Cook referenced the documentary at the Computers, Privacy and Data Protection Conference saying, "It is long past time to stop pretending that this approach doesn't come with a cost – of polarization, of lost trust and, yes, of violence. A social dilemma cannot be allowed to become a social catastrophe."

In 2021, Harris was named as one of Time magazine's 100 leaders shaping the future. Harris and Raskin, on their podcast Your Undivided Attention, were the first to have a long-form interview with Facebook whistleblower Frances Haugen after she was revealed to be the source behind The Facebook Files and subsequent Facebook Papers.

In 2022, Harris gave a speech at SXSW in 2022 called "The Wisdom Gap". CHT also launched its course, "The Foundations of Humane Technology", a free online course directed at product designers and technologists that has generated more than 10,000 participants in its first several months after launch.

== See also ==
- Addiction by Design
- Attention economy
- Consumtariat
- Surveillance capitalism
- The Society of the Spectacle
- Television consumption
