= The Last Campaign of Governor Booth Gardner =

- Directed by: Daniel Junge
- Music by: Gunnard Doboze
- Country of origin: United States
- Original language: English

Production
- Producers: Henry Ansbacher; Davis Coombe
- Editor: Davis Coombe
- Running time: 38 minutes
- Production companies: Just Media; HBO Films

Original release
- Network: HBO
- Release: August 1, 2009

The Last Campaign of Governor Booth Gardner is a 2009 documentary film directed by Daniel Junge and produced by Just Media for HBO Films. The film follows the "last campaign" of Booth Gardner, the Governor of Washington from 1985 to 1993, to facilitate the passage of the Washington Death with Dignity Act (also called Initiative 1000), legalizing physician-assisted suicide in Washington state.

Gardner, who had been diagnosed with Parkinson's disease in 1994, faces opposition from numerous determined individuals and groups, but nonetheless spearheads a successful campaign which saw the state pass I-1000—the second such law in the United States after Oregon Measure 16—with 57.8 per cent support.

The Last Campaign was nominated for the Academy Award for Best Documentary (Short Subject) in 2009.
