= List of Around The World For Free episodes =

This is an episode list for the American reality television series Around the World for Free. The first season aired on WGN America. The show is currently airing on DSTV channel 113 via Sony Entertainment Television (South Africa), Nigeria, Kenya, Uganda, Ghana, Tanzania, Namibia, Botswana, Zambia, Mozambique, Lesotho and Zimbabwe1. An All-American Launch

2. Caribbean: Bliss & Extreme

3. South American Reality Check

4. Peruvian Sunshine

5. Desert and Cape

6. South African Kaleidoscope

7. Into the Safari Spirit

8. African Hardships

9. Good Vibes in Thailand and Cambodia

10. Living History in Cambodia and Vietnam

11. Back in Good ol’ USA
