= Passport to Latin America =

- Also known as: Passport to Latin America with Samantha Brown
- Written by: Samantha Brown
- Starring: Samantha Brown
- Country of origin: United States
- No. of seasons: 1
- No. of episodes: 19

Production
- Running time: 30 minutes

Original release
- Network: Travel Channel
- Release: June 6, 2007

Related
- Great Hotels, Passport to Europe

Passport to Latin America is a television show on the Travel Channel hosted by television host Samantha Brown and includes tours of Latin America. A successor to Brown's Passport to Europe series, in Passport to Latin America she tours cities of Latin America such as Mexico City, Rio de Janeiro, and Buenos Aires and interacts with the town's locals. She also visits local landmarks, including popular restaurants and shopping locales, and educates viewers on events in the city's history.

The series premiered on June 6, 2007.

== Episodes ==
- Belize
- Buenos Aires, Argentina
- Central Valley, Costa Rica
- Coastal Chile
- Cusco, Peru
- Granada, Nicaragua
- Guadalajara, Mexico
- Guanacaste, Costa Rica
- Honduras
- Machu Picchu, Peru
- Mexico City, Mexico
- Montevideo, Uruguay
- Panama City, Panama
- Punta Arenas, Chile
- Quito, Ecuador
- Rio de Janeiro, Brazil
- Santiago, Chile
- São Paulo, Brazil
- Zihuatanejo & Ixtapa, Mexico

== See also ==
- Samantha Brown
- Travel Channel
- Passport to Europe
- Great Hotels
- Latin America
