= Queen Anne Hotel =

Hotel in San Francisco, California

Coordinates: 37°47′14″N 122°25′36″W

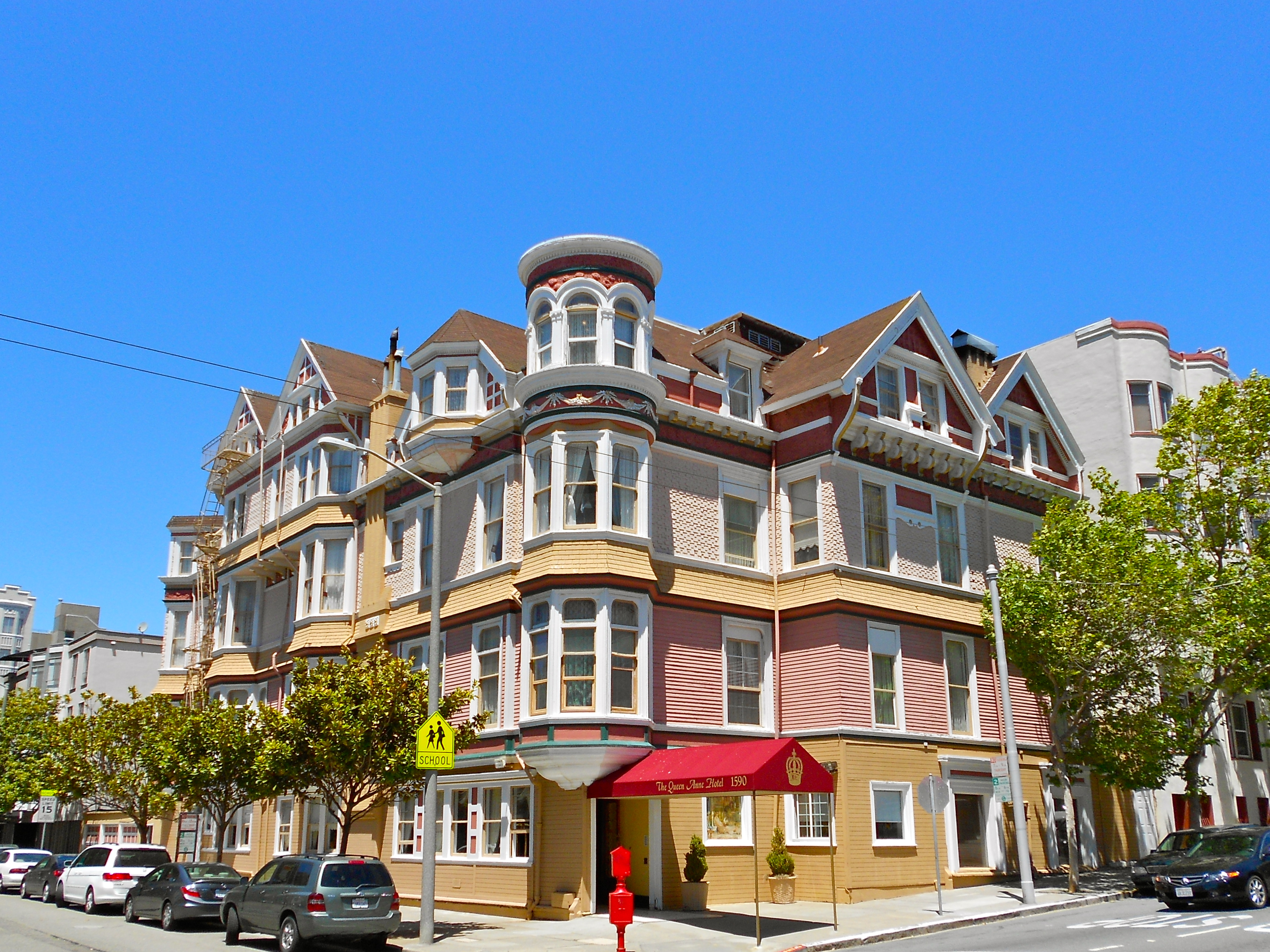
- Queen Anne Hotel

- Location within San Francisco Queen Anne Hotel (California) Queen Anne Hotel (the United States)

General information
- Architectural style: Queen Anne architectural style
- Location: 1590 Sutter Street, San Francisco, California, United States
- Completed: 1890

The Queen Anne Hotel is a hotel in San Francisco, on Sutter Street. The hotel is a historic 1890 Victorian mansion, in the namesake Queen Anne architectural style, and decorated in the painted lady style. It was originally a girl's boarding school. It narrowly survived the 1906 San Francisco earthquake.

== Haunting ==
The hotel is a popular site for ghost hunting. The headmistress of the former finishing school, Mary Lake, is said to haunt her former office in Room 410. The hotel's paranormal history was explored in an episode of the television show Haunted Hotels.

== See also ==
- List of hotels in San Francisco
