= Tristan Harris =

American computer scientist and businessman

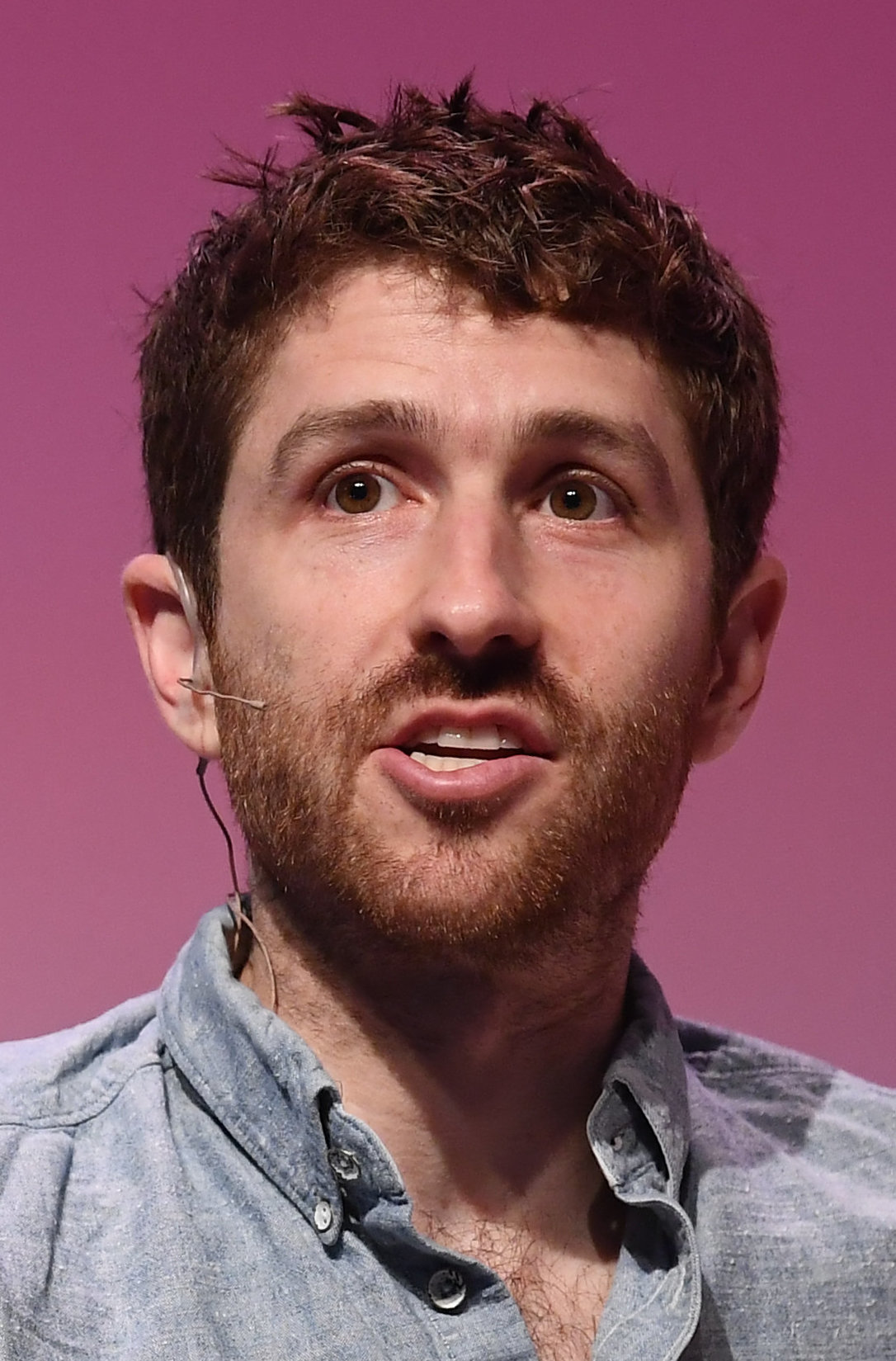
- Harris during the Collision Conference at Ernest N. Morial Convention Center, 2018
- Born: 1983 or 1984 (age 41–42)
- Education: Stanford University (BS)
- Organization: Center for Humane Technology (co-founder)
- Known for: Starring in The Social Dilemma (2020)
- Website: Official website

Tristan Harris (/trɪsˈtɑːn/; born 1983/1984) is an American technology ethicist. He is the co-founder of the Center for Humane Technology.

Harris has appeared in the Netflix documentary The Social Dilemma. The film features Harris and other former tech employees explaining how the design of social media platforms nurtures addiction to maximize profit and manipulates people's views, emotions, and behavior. The film also examines social media's effect on mental health, particularly of adolescents.

== Early life and education ==
Harris was raised in the San Francisco Bay Area. He has described his childhood curiosity, including early interests in magic and illusion, as formative in developing an awareness of how easily human perception can be shaped.

He studied computer science at Stanford University while interning at Apple Inc. He then pursued a master's degree at Stanford with a focus on human-computer Interaction, where he took a class from B. J. Fogg, who runs the Persuasive Technology Lab, before dropping out. During his time at Stanford he participated in the Mayfield Fellows Program, which exposed him to successful alumni and future tech leaders. At Stanford, Harris was classmates with one of Instagram's founders, Kevin Systrom and helped create a demo app with its other founder, Mike Krieger.

According to his own recounting on the podcast The Diary of a CEO, that early exposure to both technical training and the entrepreneurial mindset helped shape his beliefs about technology's potential to influence and eventually control people’s attention and behavior.

These experiences eventually informed his decision to leave the building of attention-hijacking products behind and instead strive to redesign technology to respect human attention and well-being.

== Career ==
In 2007, Harris launched a startup called Apture. Google acquired Apture in 2011, and Harris ended up working on Google Inbox.

While at Google, Harris increasingly questioned the ethics of design decisions aimed at maximizing engagement and attention.

In February 2013, while working at Google, Harris authored a presentation titled “A Call to Minimize Distraction & Respect Users’ Attention,” which he shared with a small number of coworkers. In that presentation, he suggested that Google, Apple and Facebook should "feel an enormous responsibility" to make sure humanity does not spend its days buried in a smartphone. The 141-slide deck went viral at Google; it was eventually viewed by tens of thousands of Google employees and sparked conversations about the company's responsibilities long after Harris's departure. Harris holds several patents from his previous work at Apple, Wikia, Apture, and Google.

Harris left Google in December 2015 to co-found the 501(c)3 nonprofit organization Time Well Spent, later called the Center for Humane Technology. Through his work at CHT, Harris hoped to re-align technology with humanity's best interest. He asserted that human minds can be hijacked and the choices they make are not as free as they think they are.

At CHT, Harris has advocated for understanding and minimizing the negative impacts of digital technologies. In 2017, he spoke on 60 Minutes with Anderson Cooper about the addictive design of smartphone apps. At a 2019 presentation in San Francisco, he coined the phrase "human downgrading" to describe an interconnected system of mutually reinforcing harms—addiction, distraction, isolation, polarization, fake news—that weakens human capacity, in order to capture human attention.

Harris and other CHT team members were interviewed for the film The Social Dilemma, distributed by Netflix. In it he says, "Never before in history have fifty designers made decisions that would have an impact on two billion people" about the harms of social media.

CHT offers an online course on how to build humane and ethical technology, called The Foundations of Humane Technology, which has received notable media coverage.

In recent years, Harris has expanded his focus from the attention economy to close the gap between the accelerating pace of technology and risks/externalities it creates, compared to the capacity of culture and its institutions to respond and adequately guard against them. Harris and CHT call this "wisdom gap."

The Atlantic stated in its November 2016 issue that "Harris is the closest thing Silicon Valley has to a conscience." Since then, he has been named on Time 100 Next Leaders Shaping 2021, Rolling Stone’s 25 People Changing the Future, and Fortune’s 25 Ideas that Will Change the Future. He is also the co-host of the podcast, Your Undivided Attention.

Since 2023, Harris and the Center for Humane Technology have expanded their mission to address the societal risks associated with artificial intelligence.

== Media and other activities ==
At the TEDTalk 2017 conference, Harris exposed how a handful of tech companies are able to manipulate billions of people to generate billions of dollars in ad revenue. He implored his peers to be more conscious and ethical in shaping the human spirit and human potential through technology. The foundation of his presentation was the Time Well Spent thesis. Time Well Spent was quickly adopted by tech industry giants Facebook, Instagram, YouTube, and Google through the addition of features designed to encourage users to monitor their time online.

Harris continued his advocacy for tech reform. In 2019, the New York Times published his op-ed, "Our Brains Are No Match for Our Technology." In the same year, Harris's thoughts were featured on Fortune’s 25 Ideas that Will Shape the 2020s, alongside influential entrepreneurs such as Melinda Gates and Malala Yousafzai.

Harris has testified before the United States Congress on multiple occasions. In 2019, Harris gave testimony at the United States Senate's hearing on Optimizing for Engagement: Understanding the Use of Persuasive Technology on Internet Platforms. In 2020, he testified in the House hearing on Americans at Risk: Manipulation and Deception in the Digital Age.

In 2021, Harris provided testimony to the Senate Judiciary Subcommittee on Privacy, Technology and the Law on data privacy and how algorithms are able to influence people's choices and effectively change their minds. In his testimony, Harris encouraged lawmakers and social media designers to reset their criteria for success. According to Harris, "Instead of evaluating whether my fellow Facebook, Twitter and YouTube panelists have improved their content policies or hired more content moderators, we should ask what would collectively constitute a 'humane' Western digital democratic infrastructure that would strengthen our capacity to meet these threats."

In October 2022, Harris joined the Council for Responsible Social Media project launched by Issue One to address the negative mental, civic, and public health impacts of social media in the United States co-chaired by former House Democratic Caucus Leader Dick Gephardt and former Massachusetts Lieutenant Governor Kerry Healey.

In September 2024, Harris appeared as a guest on Oprah Winfrey's ABC special "AI and the Future of Us: An Oprah Winfrey Special.” In the special, Harris warned about the rapid pace of AI development, noting that "the problem with AI is that we don't get that time to adapt" compared to previous technologies like cars that took decades to add safety features.

In April 2025, Harris delivered a TED Talk titled, “Why AI is our ultimate test and greatest invitation.” He calls on society to learn from the mistakes of social media’s rollout and confront the predictable dangers of reckless AI development, offering a “narrow path” where power is matched with responsibility, foresight and wisdom.

In August 2025, Harris was a featured guest on Real Time with Bill Maher, where he discussed AI risks including AI uncontrollability.

In October 2025, Harris appeared on The Daily Show with Jon Stewart to discuss the societal impacts of AI and social media, including the dangers unregulated AI can cause for humanity and the workforce.

== See also ==
- The Human Movement
- Center for Humane Technology
- Renée DiResta
- Aza Raskin
