= Samantha Brown =

American television personality (born 1970)

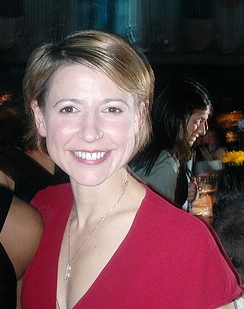
- Brown in 2006
- Born: Samantha Elizabeth Brown; Dallas, Texas, U.S.
- Occupations: TV personality, TV show host
- Spouse: Kevin J. O'Leary (m. 2006)
- Children: 2
- Website: samantha-brown.com

Samantha Elizabeth Brown is an American television host who presented several Travel Channel shows including Girl Meets Hawaii, Great Vacation Homes, Great Hotels, Passport to Europe, Passport to Latin America, Great Weekends, Green Getaways, Passport to China, and Samantha Brown's Asia. In January 2018, she began hosting Samantha Brown's Places to Love on PBS. It is shown on PBS stations nationwide, as well as the PBS website and app.

== Early life ==
Brown was born on March 31, 1970, in Dallas, Texas. In second grade, she moved with her family to New Castle, New Hampshire, where she grew up. She graduated from Pinkerton Academy in Derry, New Hampshire.

== Commercials ==
Brown's early career included working in commercials, playing the spokesperson Wendy Wire for a company called Century Cable. She appeared in the HP Pavilion "Computer is Personal Again" commercials. Additionally, she is the spokesperson for ECCO shoes.

== Travel Channel ==
In 1999 and 2000, the Travel Channel was looking for a travel host, and Brown was chosen after a series of auditions. In her role, she introduces viewers to vacation destinations and hotels in the United States and around the world, as well as showcasing restaurants and activities at those destinations. As a travel host, Brown traveled 230 days out of the year and took eight days to film an hour-long episode.

Since joining the network, Brown hosted several series including Girl Meets Hawaii, Great Vacation Homes, Great Hotels, Passport to Europe, Passport to Great Weekends, and Passport to Latin America.

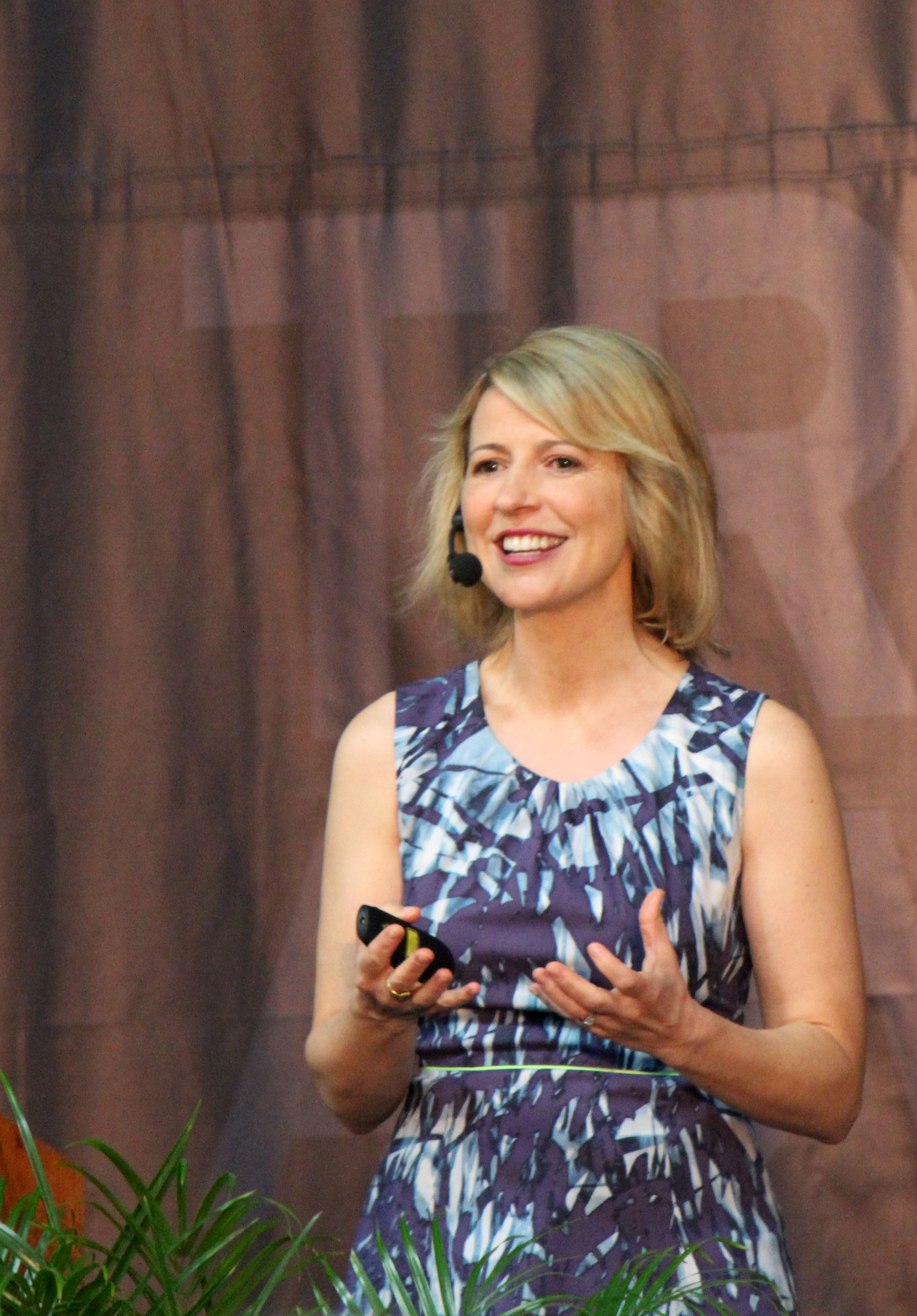
Brown speaking in San Diego in March 2014

In addition to her regular shows, Brown hosted several Travel Channel specials, such as the 2006 all-access special Great Cruises: Freedom of the Seas with Samantha Brown aboard the Freedom of the Seas cruise ship, the largest passenger ship in the world at the time of its launch. Prior to that, she hosted a 12-night Mediterranean Venice cruise aboard the Brilliance of the Seas cruise ship. The accompanying show was titled Samantha Brown's First Cruise. In 2007, she hosted a special titled Passport to Green Getaways, a travelogue to three eco-friendly destinations in North America.

In 2007, Brown had two shows in production. In April 2007, Discovery Networks announced that she would host a series titled Passport to Great Weekends ... With Samantha Brown exploring 48-hour vacation locations in the US and abroad. In September 2007, she was in Beijing, filming Passport to China, which aired in July 2008, just ahead of the Beijing Olympics.

In 2008, Brown debuted Passport to Great Weekends, which showcased her more informally, as well as following her on more unique, off-the-beaten-path vacations. Episodes had her arrive at a destination on a Friday afternoon and concluded with her leaving on Sunday evening. The second season's title was changed to Samantha Brown's Great Weekends and featured a new introduction, but mostly the same format.

On February 8, 2010, the Travel Channel presented Samantha Brown's 10th Anniversary Special to commemorate Brown's ten years as host.

On April 9, 2010, she made a guest appearance on The Price Is Right to present a travel-themed showcase.

On July 12, 2010, Samantha Brown's Asia was released on the Travel Channel.

Anthony Bourdain's "Christmas Special" episode of No Reservations, first aired in the U.S. on December 12, 2011. Brown appeared in a segment that satirized both her persona and the supposed conflict between the "perky" Brown and the "edgy" Bourdain. In the same month, Brown hosted a video tour of the new Disney resort in Hawaii, which was produced and released by Disney to promote the Disney Vacation Club.

In the summer of 2013, Samantha shot a new pilot for the Travel Channel in the Yellowstone area but Brown tweeted at the time that she could not talk about it for fear of jinxing the project. The project later proved to be two sample episodes of Samantha Brown's Cash Attack, a travel-related game show. Brown ambushed tourists in popular travel destinations and gave them an opportunity to win cash by answering questions related to the area and/or performing travel challenges. The two episodes aired on November 26, 2013.

Brown served as a co-host of The Trip: 2014, a sweepstakes event that took viewers on a trip through Spain and Morocco.

Brown was also a co-host for The Trip: 2015 in Hawaii, which originally aired in February 2015. She was seen in the Travel Channel series 50/50 with co-host Chris Grundy in 2015 and Track Down Samantha Brown.

== PBS ==
In the summer of 2017, Brown left the Travel Channel and later started filming a new series for PBS, Samantha Brown's Places to Love. According to PBS, the series, first airing on January 6, 2018, features Brown seeking out "the little known spots and haunts where innovators and disrupters are creating a brand new travel experience. Whether it's food and drink, art and design, culture or adventure, at the end of each episode viewers will have a well curated list of experiences that focus on not just how to visit a destination but how to belong to it." In March 2019, Samantha Brown's Places to Love received three Daytime Emmy nominations, for Outstanding Travel/Adventure Program, Outstanding Directing in a Lifestyle Program, and Outstanding Host in a Lifestyle Program. On May 3, 2019, Samantha Brown's Places to Love won the Emmy for Outstanding Travel/Adventure Program and Brown won the Emmy for Outstanding Host. On February 11, 2020, Brown announced on Facebook that Samantha Brown's Places to Love was beginning production on Season 4.

== Personal life ==
On October 28, 2006, Brown married Kevin James O’Leary. On January 17, 2013, Brown gave birth to fraternal twins in Brooklyn, New York.
