= Chris Grundy =

American TV presenter (b.1967)

Chris Grundy (September 24, 1967 (age 57)) co-hosts the Travel Channel's show 50/50, in which random strangers are offered the chance to join the hosts on a 50-hour trip that is worth $50,000. In order to do so, they must drop everything and that day. Grundy was previously host of the American television show Cool Tools, which ran on the DIY Network. The program introduced new tools and centered on Grundy's humorous presentation style. Grundy also hosted DIY Networks "Blog Cabin". The features and materials, inside & outside, are chosen by viewers via online voting. Grundy and other DIY hosts then renovate a cabin with the most popular features. Once the cabin is finished a lucky viewer wins it in a sweepstakes.

While he currently works as a television host, Grundy has also made notable appearances as a character actor on shows such as Andy Barker, P.I. and Help Me Help You. Grundy started his career as a performer in improv comedy groups in the Denver, Colorado, area such as Chicken Lips, Impulse Theater and Rattlebrain Theater. He moved on to perform with The Second City, and performed the lead police officer role in Throttle. In 2015, Grundy began co-hosting the Travel Channel series 50/50 with Samantha Brown.

== Notable quotes ==
"Chris Grundy want pants too!"
