= Royal Palms Resort and Spa =

- Hotel chain: The Unbound Collection by Hyatt

General information
- Renovated: 1948, 2017
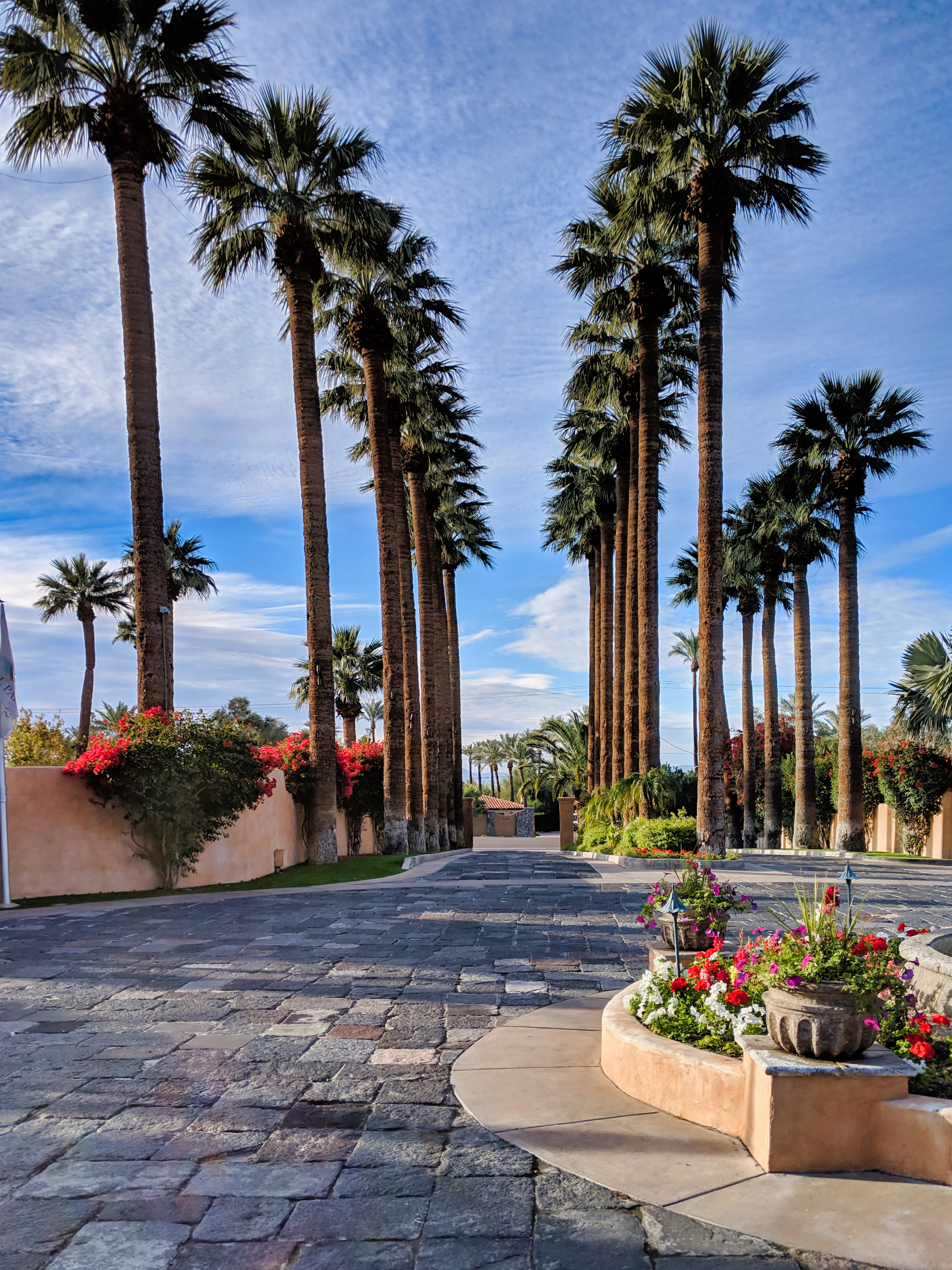

- Location within Arizona Location within the United States
- 33.50472°N 111.96813°W

History
- Built: 1929

Royal Palms Resort and Spa is a historic hotel in Phoenix, Arizona. It was built in Spanish Colonial style in 1929 as a retirement home for New York businessman Delos Cooke, who died unexpectedly in 1931, and his wife. It opened as a hotel in 1948.

It is a member of the Historic Hotels of America program of the National Trust for Historic Preservation.

The hotel's mahogany front doors are original. It has an almost-unique imported Spanish tile mural called the "Lady of Spain". Its Mansion Courtyard has 24 tiles in its archways, each representing a Spanish province; these are also original to the estate. The resort has almost 200 examples of palm trees, in 14 varieties.

Beginning in the mid-1980s, the Orange Tree dining room hosted dinner and dancing performances by entertainers including Frank Sinatra Jr., Patti Andrews of the Andrew Sisters, Julius LaRosa, Hildegarde, John Gary, Margaret Whiting, Sandler and Young, Tony Martin, and Carmen Cavallaro.

The 1992 TV movie Sunstroke, with Don Ameche (in his last TV role) and Jane Seymour, was filmed at Royal Palms. Seymour's character, after a bitter divorce, sought to regain custody of her daughter in a film noir journey; Ameche played a Scottsdale motel manager.

There are 24 fountains, and 73 fireplaces (some inside guest rooms), and 193 palm trees.

The resort was sold for $88.25 million in 2016.

The resort finished a $3.7 million renovation in 2017. The historically sensitive renovation addressed all 119 guest rooms, the resort's lounge area with its "Mother-of-Pearl"-tiled swimming pool, its event lawns, and landscaping which includes almost 200 palm trees across its nine acres.

In 2018 the resort celebrated its 70th anniversary. There was a "Royal Palms 70th Anniversary Party" on September 20, 2018. Tickets were $50 and guests were invited to wear 1940s resort wear.

The resort was listed as one of the most romantic hotels in the world by Luxury Travel magazine in 2022.

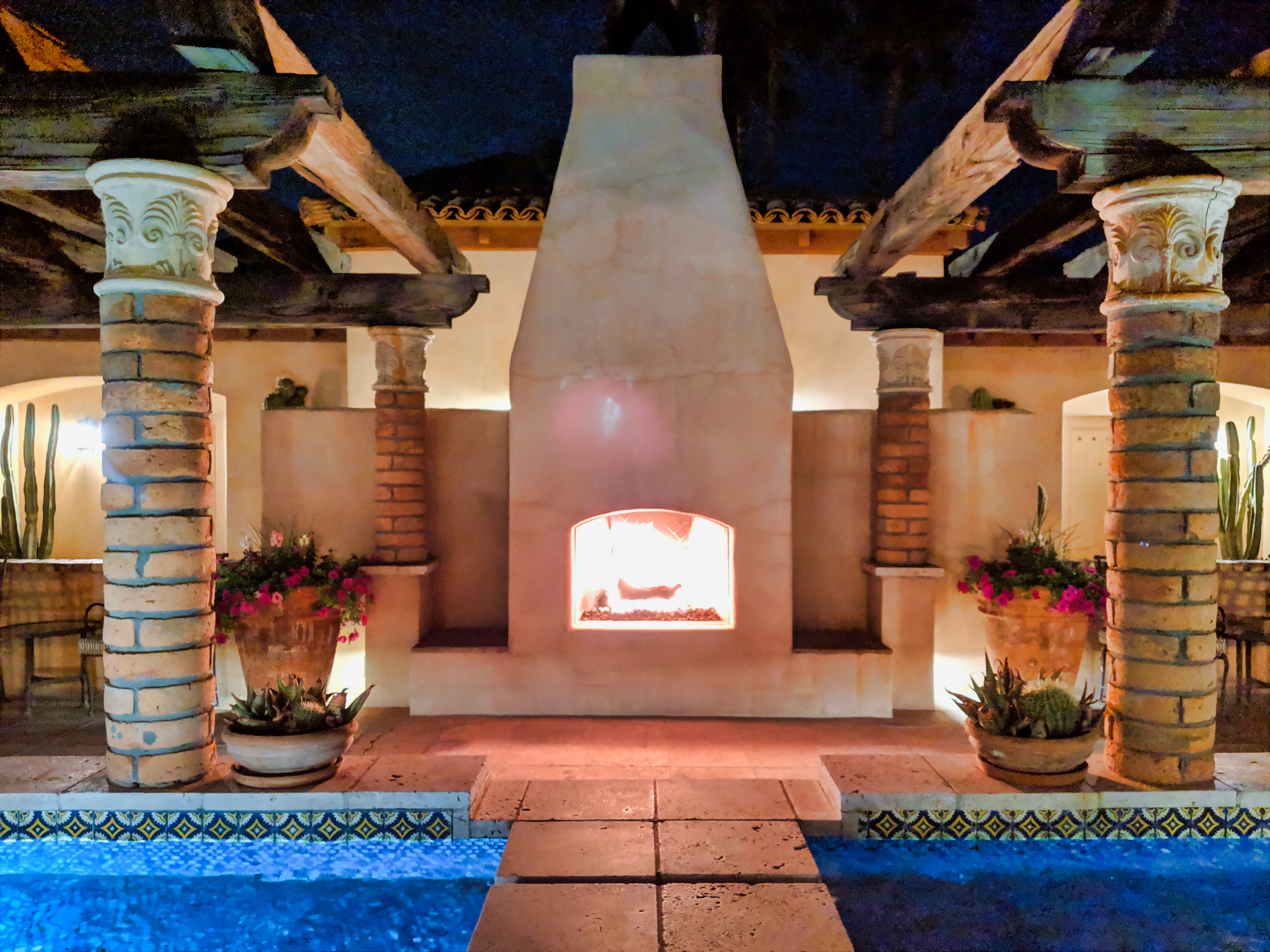
Fireplace at pool in 2018

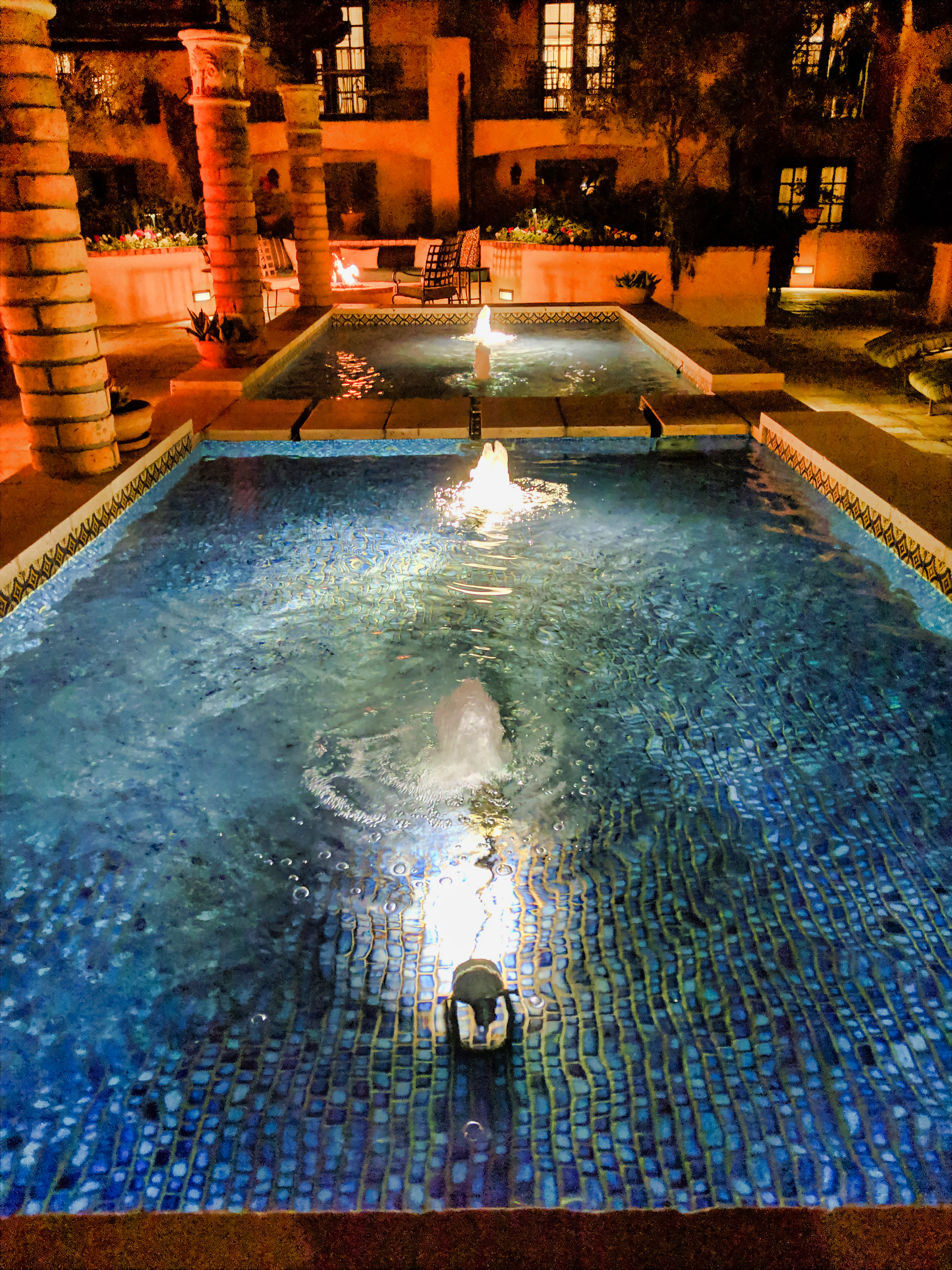
Mother-of-Pearl tiled pool

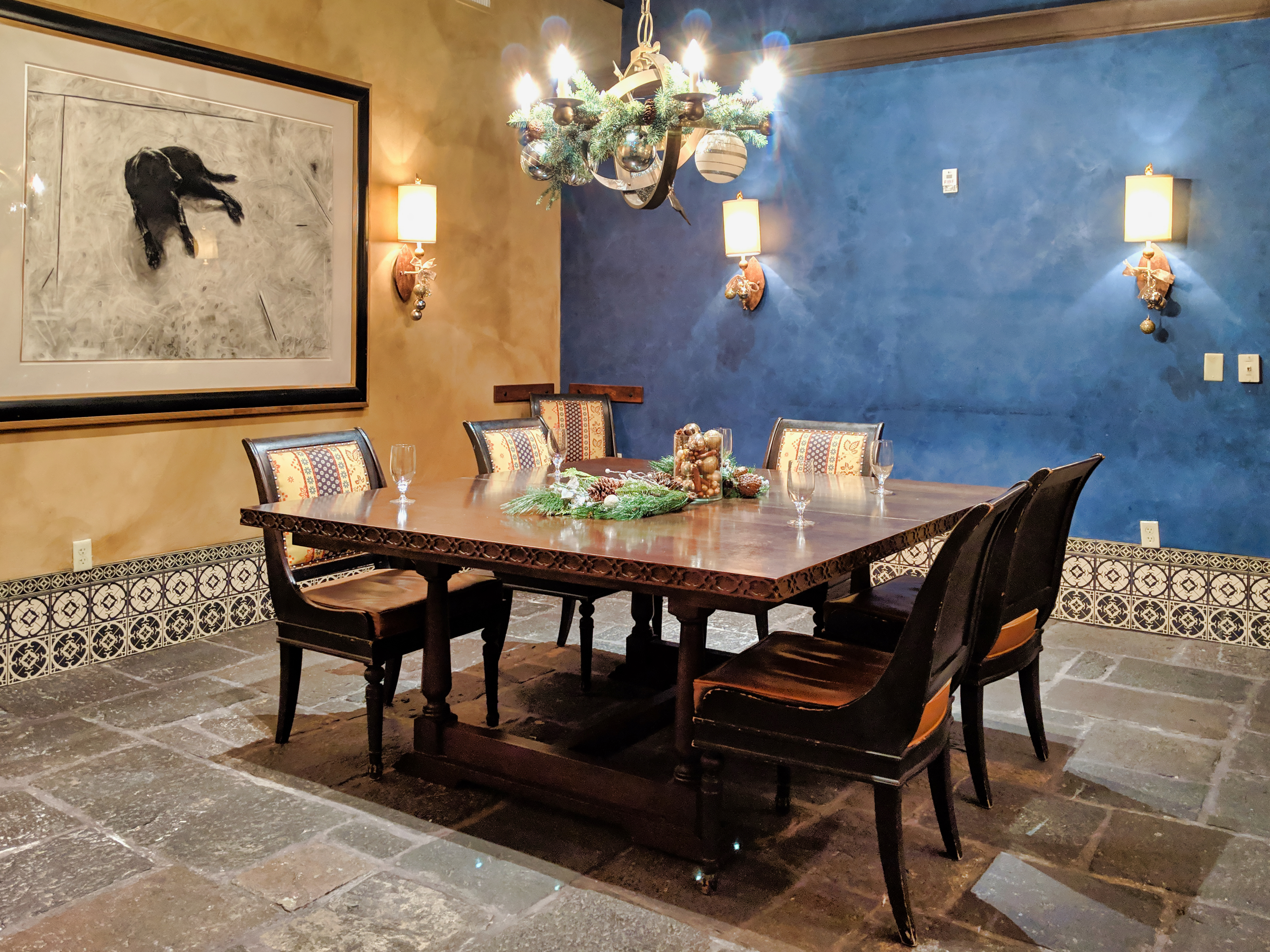
