= Hotel Maison De Ville =

Coordinates: 29.9576°N 90.0660°W

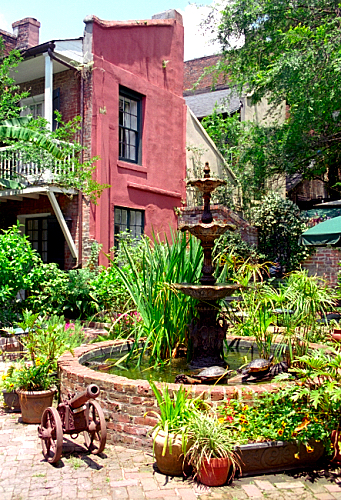
Hotel Maison de Ville courtyard garden.

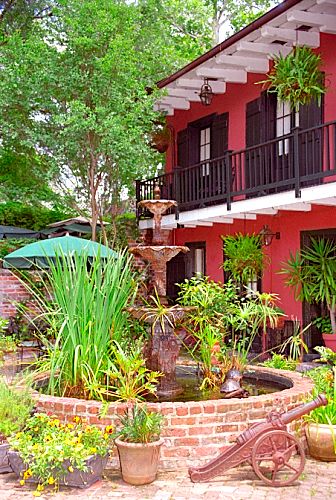
Fountain in hotel's courtyard garden.

The Hotel Maison de Ville was a historic hotel located in the French Quarter north of Jackson Square, in New Orleans, Louisiana, established in 1944. As of 2024, it is a boutique hotel called The Celestine. The hotel is known as the location where American playwright Tennessee Williams wrote part of A Streetcar Named Desire. The main building built in 1791 was the childhood home of Henriette DeLille, founder of the Sisters of the Holy Family, one of the earliest Black Catholic religious orders in the United States.

The premises consisted of a historic hotel building (1800), a garden courtyard, and separate former slave quarters (1750s)—now cottages.

== History ==
=== Hotel ===
In the early 19th century, the building belonged to the family of Henriette DeLille. The main building was constructed after the disastrous Great New Orleans Fire of 1788, which destroyed much of 18th century New Orleans. It was a two-story dwelling built by New France colonist Jean-Baptiste Lilie Sarpy in 1800.

In 1944, Madeline Erlich opened the Hotel Maison de Ville.

The playwright Tennessee Williams was a guest at the hotel in the 20th century. His favorite room was named in his honor.

The former carriage house, adjacent to the Hotel Maison de Ville's courtyard, was converted to guest lodgings.

=== Slave quarters ===
Four former slave quarters are located across the courtyard. They were built fifty years before the main building—circa 1750s—and are now used for guest accommodations. These cottages, along with the Old Ursuline Convent, are believed to be the oldest buildings in New Orleans, though research has been hampered by the loss of historical documents.

In the 19th and early 20th century, the cottages were also used as garconnières or bachelor quarters. The Créoles often provided separate buildings where their adult sons lived until marriage, giving them privacy.
