= Passport to Europe =

American television show (2004–2006)

- Also known as: Passport to Europe with Samantha Brown
- Written by: Samantha Brown; David Dean
- Directed by: Jerry Smith; Joan McCord; Sid Goldberg; Sylvia Caminer
- Presented by: Samantha Brown
- Country of origin: United States
- No. of seasons: 2
- No. of episodes: 55

Production
- Executive producers: Jerry Smith; Cindy Smith
- Running time: 30 minutes

Original release
- Network: Travel Channel
- Release: December 31, 2004 – 2006

Related
- Great Hotels; Passport to Latin America

Passport to Europe is an American television show on the Travel Channel from 2004 to 2006. The show follows the bubbly and upbeat television host Samantha Brown around Europe visiting various popular European cities, including prime travel destinations such as Berlin, Munich, Amsterdam, Venice, Florence, Rome, Paris and London, as well as smaller cities such as Stratford-upon-Avon, Penzance and Oxford in England.

In the course of each show, Brown tours each city and interacts with the town's locals (occasionally with the use of subtitles for the viewer, even for English-speaking countries, such as Scotland). She also visits local landmarks - including popular restaurants and shopping locales - and educates viewers on events in the city's history.

The show was nominated for a Daytime Emmy in 2006 in the same category that the Travel Channel series Great Hotels went on to win.

In July 2006, Brown announced that Passport to Europe had officially wrapped, and that Passport to Latin America would start filming in September 2006.

Passport to Europe won an Emmy award for "Outstanding Lifestyle Directing." Brown was quoted saying:

"We got the news last night (6/14) — we were in our hotel bar having a wrap of Mexico City drink. Many of us had retired to our hotel rooms to pack for leaving the next day or just go to bed. Joan McCord (Director) got the news and so of course we changed from our PJ’s back into our clothes and went back down to the bar so we could order a couple of bottles of Champagne. We are all absolutely thrilled…beyond thrilled to be recognized this way. PineRidge and Travel Channel now have TWO EMMYs for Great Hotels and Passport to Europe. Not bad at all."

Brown also hosts Great Hotels.

== Places visited ==
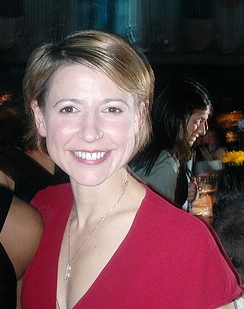
The host Samantha Brown

- Aix-en-Provence, France
- Amalfi Coast, Italy
- Amsterdam, Netherlands
- Athens, Greece
- Barcelona, Spain
- Bath, United Kingdom
- Bavaria, Germany
- Berlin, Germany
- Bologna, Italy
- Brittany, France
- Brussels, Belgium
- Cannes, France
- Cornwall, United Kingdom
- Copenhagen, Denmark
- County Cork, Ireland
- Crete, Greece
- Dublin, Ireland
- Edinburgh, United Kingdom
- Florence, Italy
- Geneva, Switzerland
- Glasgow, United Kingdom
- Helsinki, Finland
- Innsbruck, Austria
- Interlaken, Switzerland
- Inverness, United Kingdom
- Lisbon, Portugal
- London, United Kingdom
- Lyon, France
- Madrid, Spain
- Mallorca, Spain
- Marseille, France
- Milan, Italy
- Monte Carlo, Monaco
- Munich, Germany
- Mykonos, Greece
- Naples, Italy
- Normandy, France
- Oxford, United Kingdom
- Paris, France
- Penzance, United Kingdom
- Prague, Czech Republic
- Rome, Italy
- Reykjavík, Iceland
- Salzburg, Austria
- St. Moritz, Switzerland
- Santorini, Greece
- Seville, Spain
- Stockholm, Sweden
- Stratford-upon-Avon, United Kingdom
- Turin, Italy
- Tuscany, Italy
- Verona, Italy
- Vienna, Austria
- Venice, Italy
- Zurich, Switzerland

== Media ==
Four DVDs were released:

Passport to Europe with Samantha Brown: England, Ireland and Scotland. It includes the following episodes:

- English Countryside (Bath & Cotswolds)
- Classic London
- London Now
- Ireland Coast (County Cork & County Kerry)
- Dublin, Ireland
- Edinburgh, Scotland

Passport to Europe with Samantha Brown: Seven Fabulous Cities. It includes the following episodes:

- Brussels, Belgium
- Prague, Czech Republic
- Amsterdam, Holland
- Barcelona, Spain
- Madrid, Spain
- Seville, Spain
- Lisbon, Portugal

Passport to Europe with Samantha Brown: Germany, Switzerland and Austria . It includes the following episodes:

- Bavaria (Mittenwald & Oberammergau), Germany
- Berlin, Germany
- Munich, Germany
- Innsbruck, Austria
- Salzburg, Austria
- Vienna, Austria
- Interlaken, Switzerland
- St. Moritz, Switzerland
- Zurich, Switzerland

Passport to Europe with Samantha Brown: France and Italy . It includes the following episodes:

- Cannes and Nice, France
- Paris, France (2 episodes)
- Monte Carlo, Monaco
- Amalfi Coast, Italy
- Florence, Italy
- Naples, Italy
- Rome, Italy
