= Bay of All Saints (film) =

Bay of All Saints is a documentary film by Annie Eastman and produced by Diane Markrow and Davis Coombe about the conditions of families who live in a community of palafitas in Salvador, Bahia. Palafitas are shacks built on stilts in the ocean bay inhabited by generations of poor families. The families of this community confront forced relocation as a government program works to reclaim the bay to restore the ecology of the bay. The story profiles three single mother households and is told from the perspective of Norato, a local refrigerator repairman.

== Production ==
Eastman first encountered the "water slums" of Bahia, Brazil in 1999 when working with a grassroots arts and education organization. For 18 months, Eastman worked and resided in this neighborhood. She began shooting Bay of All Saints in 2004 when she learned of Bahia’s plans to take down the last of the palafitas, the home of many women she befriended during her time with the arts organization. The documentary is described by The Hollywood Reporter as "personality-rich case studies of a Brazilian slum" and states "viewers will clamor to learn more about political failures that occur outside the film's domestic frame."

== Film festivals and awards ==
Bay of All Saints is the winner of SXSW’s Audience Award for Best Feature Documentary. The film also won the Audience Award for Best Feature Documentary at the Woods Hole Film Festival. The film has been shown in an abundance of festivals such as the Vancouver International Film Festival, Miami International Film Festival, Mill Valley Film Festival, Hamptons International Film Festival, Margaret Mead Film Festival, Doc Yard, Family of Women Film Festival, Starz Denver Film Festival, and It’s All True Film Festival. The film is distributed in North America by Women Make Movies and outside of North America by Filmakers Library. American press coverage for the film includes reviews from Indiewire, Slant Magazine, Documentary.org, the Wall Street Journal and an interview on LipTV
