= Great New Orleans Fire (1794) =

Conflagration in Louisiana, United States

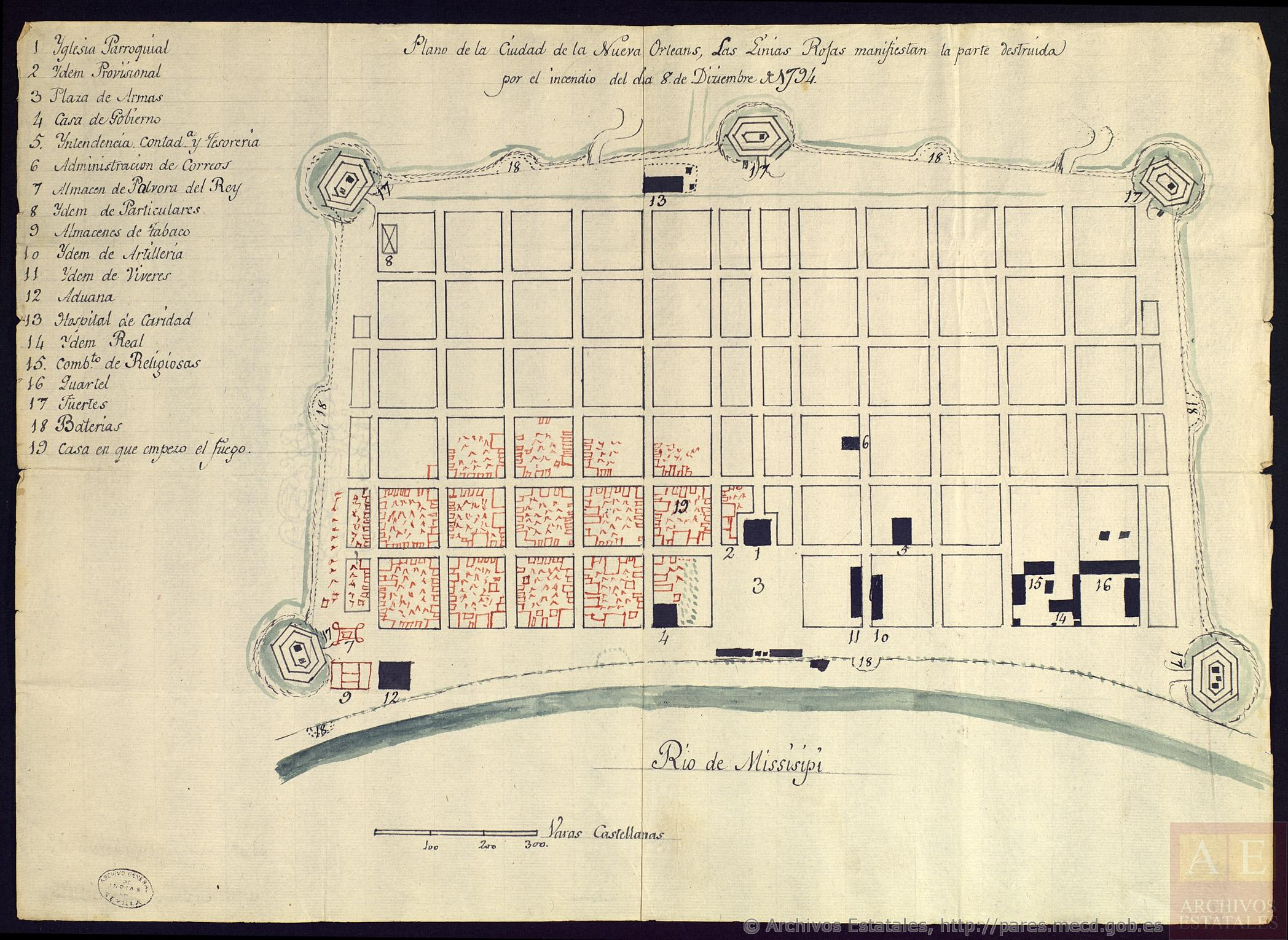
Map drawn three days after the fire showing the extent of damage.

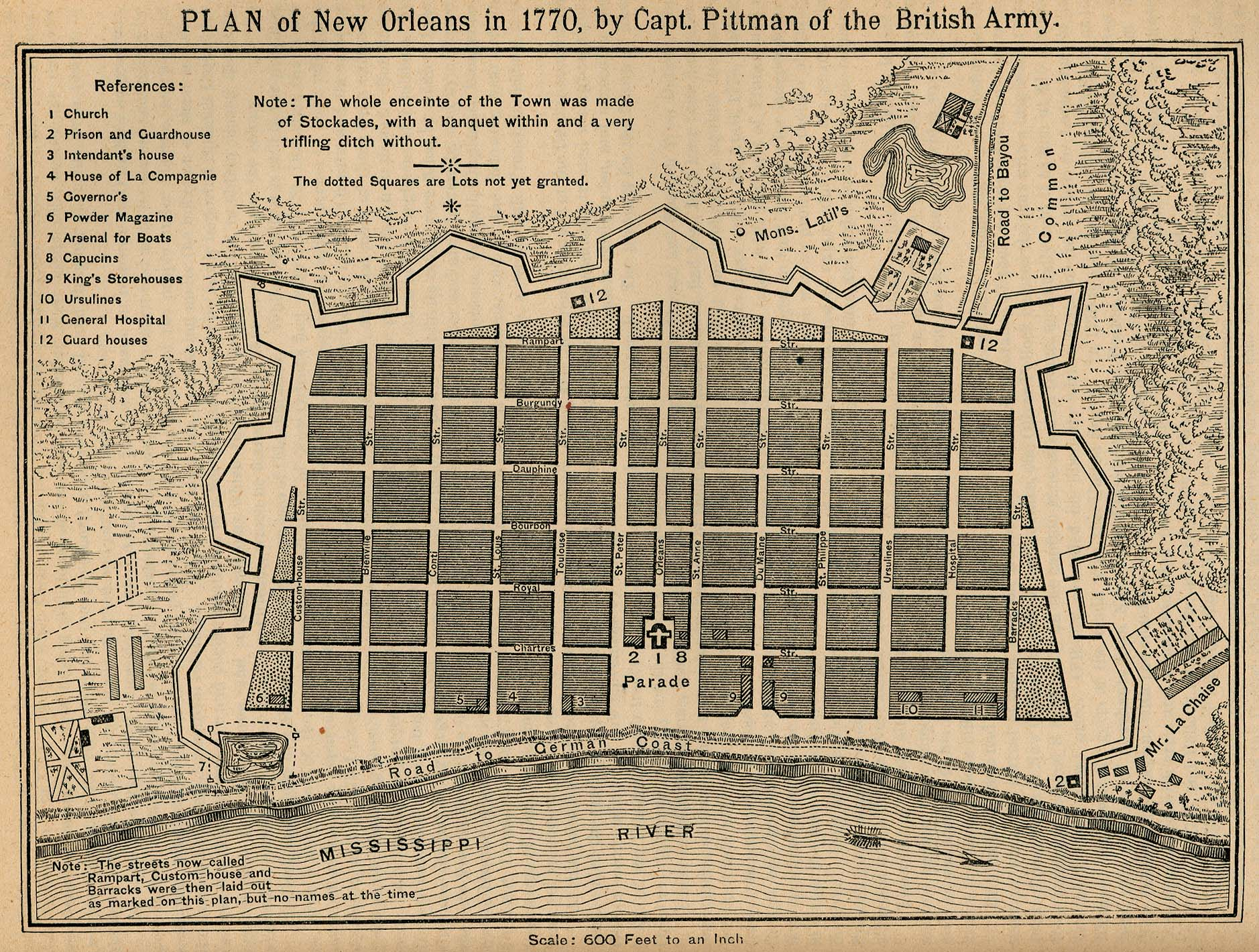
1770 map of New Orleans; Square marked behind Parade is now Jackson Square.

The Great New Orleans Fire (1794) was a major fire that destroyed 212 structures in New Orleans, Louisiana on December 8, 1794, in the area now known as the French Quarter from Burgundy to Chartres Street, adjacent to the Mississippi River. On March 12, 1788, just 6 years prior, 856 buildings had been destroyed in the First Great New Orleans Fire.

== History ==
The fire started on December 8, 1794, and stretched across 212 buildings, including the royal jail, though it stopped short of the riverfront buildings facing the Mississippi River. Among the buildings spared were the Customs House, the tobacco warehouses, the Governor's Building, the Royal Hospital, and the Ursulines Convent. Despite widespread fire damage, the new St. Louis Cathedral was not destroyed and was dedicated just two weeks later, on December 23, 1794.

In the aftermath, the schooner Nuestra Señora del Cármen was used as a temporary jail during the period December 10, 1794 to February 26, 1795. The ship's owner, Don Prospero Ferrayolo, received rental payments for use of the ship, replacing the royal jail destroyed during the fire.

Because New Orleans was at the time a colony of Spain, rebuilding after both fires continued in Spanish style, and consequently most French architecture was eliminated from the French Quarter. The Spanish occupiers replaced the wooden buildings with structures with courtyards, thick brick walls, arcades, and wrought iron balconies. Among the new buildings constructed were the signature New Orleans buildings of St. Louis Cathedral (1794), the Cabildo (1799), and the Presbytere (1797), all designed by Gilberto Guillemard.

In 1795, Don Andrés Almonaster y Rojas agreed to pay for construction of the building now known as the Cabildo. It replaced an earlier structure that had been destroyed by the fire. Almonaster had already commissioned Gilberto Guillemard to design the new cathedral and Presbytere.

== See also ==
- The Cabildo - house of government in Spanish period.
