= Great New Orleans Fire (1788) =

1788 fire in Spanish-controlled New Orleans

Coordinates: 29.9571°N 90.0643°W

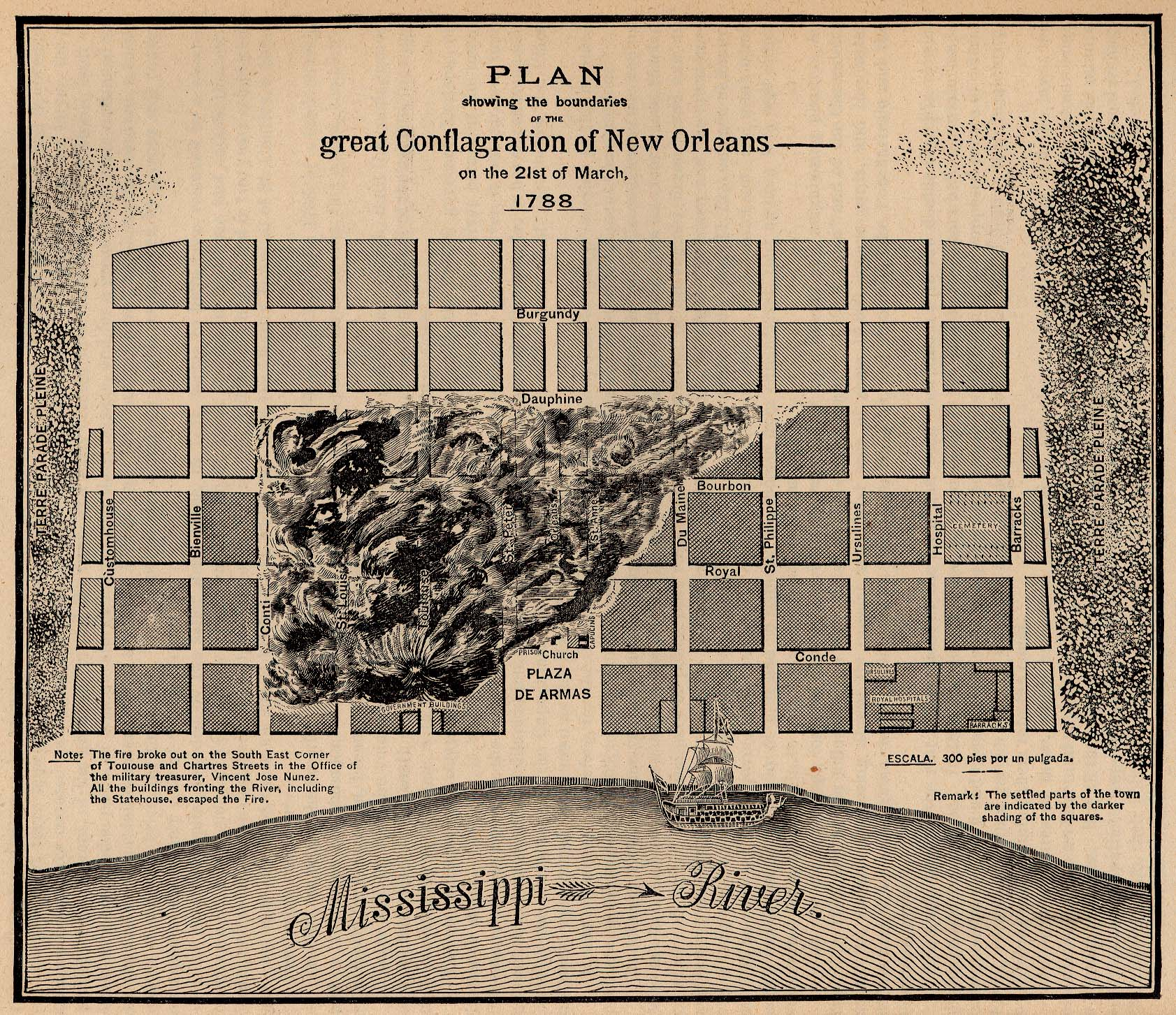
Great New Orleans Fire (1788): map showing area in flames, behind Plaza de Armas (Jackson Square) to Burgundy Street.

The Great New Orleans Fire (1788) (Spanish: Gran Incendio de Nueva Orleans, French: Grand incendie de La Nouvelle-Orléans) was a fire that destroyed 856 of the 1,100 structures (77.8% of buildings) in New Orleans, Louisiana (New Spain), on March 21, 1788, spanning the south central Vieux Carré from Burgundy to Chartres Street, almost to the Mississippi River front buildings. An additional 212 buildings were destroyed in a later citywide fire on December 8, 1794.

== History ==
The Good Friday fire began about 1:30 p.m. at the home of Army Treasurer Don Vincente Jose Nuñez, 619 Chartres Street, corner of Wilkinson, less than a block from Jackson Square (Plaza de Armas). Because the fire started on Good Friday, priests refused to allow church bells to be rung as a fire alarm. Within five hours it had consumed almost the entire city as it was fed by a strong wind from the southeast. The fire destroyed virtually all major buildings in the city (now French Quarter), including the church, municipal building, army barracks, armory, and jail. Colonial Governor Esteban Rodríguez Miró set up tents for the homeless.

The fire area stretched between Dauphine Street and the Mississippi River and between Conti Street in the south and St. Philip Street in the north. It spared the riverfront buildings including the Customs House, the tobacco warehouses, the Governor's Building, the Royal Hospital, and the Ursuline Convent.

Colonial officials were to replace the wooden buildings with masonry structures which had courtyards, thick brick walls, arcades, and wrought iron balconies. Among the new buildings were the central New Orleans (now Jackson Square) fixtures of St. Louis Cathedral, the Cabildo, and the Presbytere. The funds and supervision for the Cathedral and the Cabildo were provided by Don Andres Almonaster y Rojas. The Cabildo burned in the 1794 fire and had to be reconstructed. The Presbytere was built on a somewhat later basis, and Almonaster died before it could be completed.

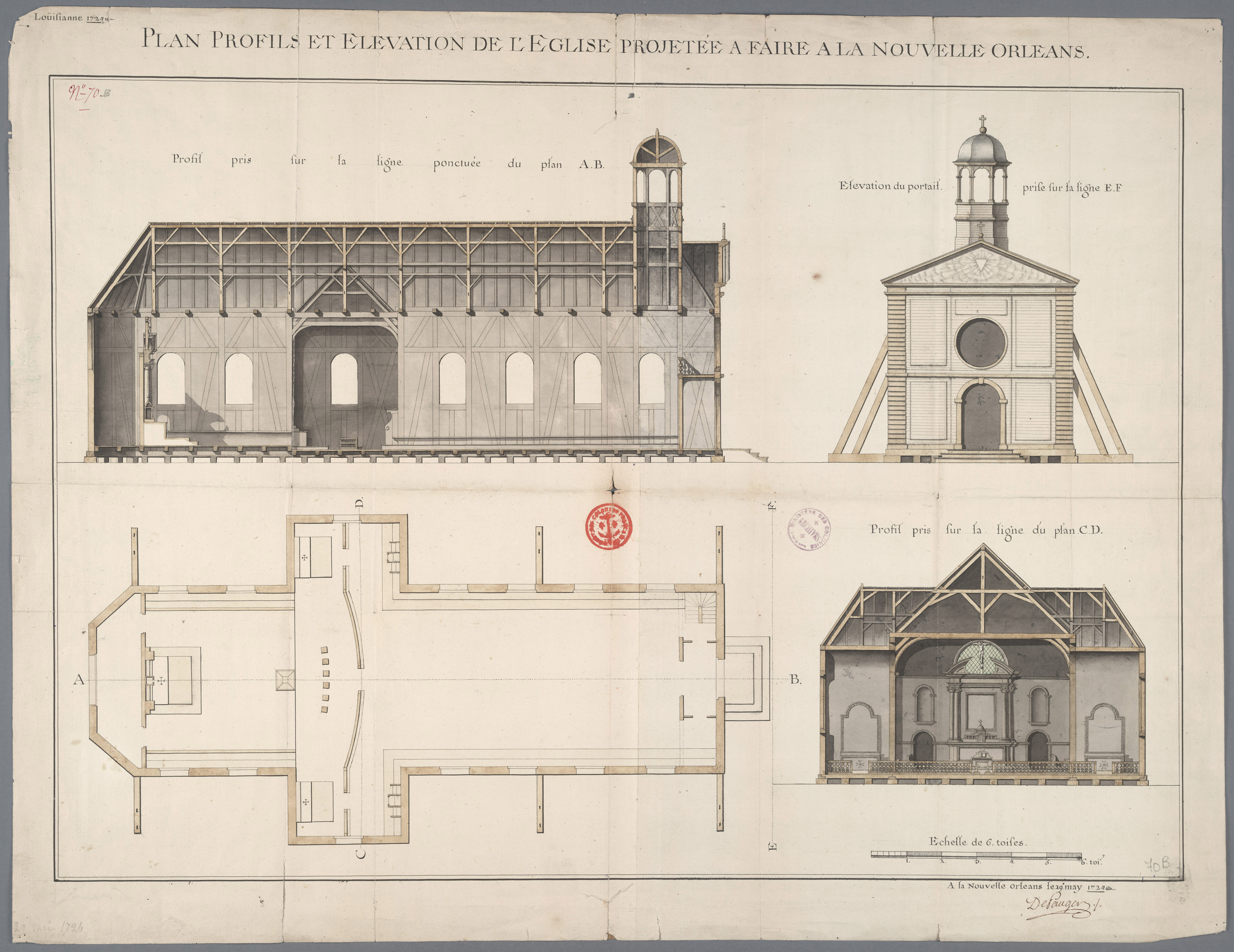
Adrien de Pauger's Saint Louis Parish Church, completed in 1727 and destroyed in the fire.

Governor Miro's report summarized the suffering:

If the imagination could describe what our senses enable us to feel from sight and touch, reason itself would recoil in horror, and it is no easy matter to say whether the sight of an entire city in flames was more horrible to behold than the suffering and pitiable condition in which everyone was involved. Mothers, in search of a sanctuary or refuge for their little ones, and abandoning - their earthly goods to the greed of the relentless enemy, would retire to out-of-the-way places rather than be witnesses of their utter ruin. Fathers and husbands were busy in saving whatever objects the rapidly spreading flames would permit them to bear off, while the general bewilderment was such as to prevent them from finding even for these a place of security. The obscurity of the night coming on threw its mantle for a while over the saddening spectacle; but more horrible still was the sight, when day began to dawn, of entire families pouring forth into the public highways, yielding to their lamentations and despair, who, but a few hours before, had been basking in the enjoyment of more than the ordinary comforts of life. The tears, the heartbreaking sobs and the pallid faces of the wretched people mirrored the dire fatality that had overcome a city, now in ruins, transformed within the space of five hours into an arid and fearful, desert. Such was the sad ending of a work of death, the result of seventy years of industry.

After six years of rebuilding, on December 8, 1794, another 212 buildings were destroyed in the Great New Orleans Fire of 1794. Still a colony of Spain, rebuilding continued in Spanish style, and most French-style architecture disappeared from the city as a result.
