= Stanford Web Credibility Project =

Project and evaluations

The Stanford Web Credibility Project, which involves assessments of website credibility conducted by the Stanford University Persuasive Technology Lab, is an investigative examination of what leads people to believe in the veracity of content found on the Web. The goal of the project is to enhance website design and to promote further research on the credibility of Web resources.

== Origins ==
The Web has become an important channel for exchanging information and services, resulting in a greater need for methods to ascertain the credibility of websites. In response, since 1998, the Stanford Persuasive Technology Lab (SPTL) has investigated what causes people to believe, or not, what they find online. SPTL provides insight into how computers can be designed to change what people think and do, an area called captology. Directed by experimental psychologist B.J. Fogg, the Stanford team includes social scientists, designers, and technologists who research and design interactive products that motivate and influence their users.

== Objectives ==
The ongoing research of the Stanford Web Credibility Project includes:

- Performing quantitative research on Web credibility
- Collecting all public information on Web credibility
- Acting as a clearinghouse for this information
- Facilitating research and discussion about Web credibility
- Collaborating with academic and industry research groups

== How Do People Evaluate a Web Site's Credibility? ==
A study by the Stanford Web Credibility Project, How Do People Evaluate a Web Site's Credibility? Results from a Large Study, published in 2002, invited 2,684 "average people" to rate the credibility of websites in ten content areas. The study evaluated the credibility of two live websites randomly assigned from one of ten content categories: e-commerce, entertainment, finance, health, news, nonprofit, opinion or review, search engines, sports, and travel. A total of one hundred sites were assessed.

This study was launched jointly with a parallel, expert-focused project conducted by Sliced Bread Design, LLC. In their study, Experts vs. Online Consumers: A Comparative Credibility Study of Health and Finance Web Sites, fifteen health and finance experts were asked to assess the credibility of the same industry-specific sites as those reviewed by the Stanford PTL consumers. The Sliced Bread Design study revealed that health and finance experts were far less concerned about the surface aspects of these industry-specific types of sites and more concerned about the breadth, depth, and quality of a site's information. Similarly, Consumer Reports WebWatch, which commissioned the study, has the goal to investigate, inform, and improve the credibility of information published on the World Wide Web. Consumer Reports had plans for a similar investigation into whether consumers actually perform the necessary credibility checks while online, and had already conducted a national poll concerning consumer awareness of privacy policies.

The common goals of the three organizations led to a collaborative research effort that may represent the largest web credibility project ever conducted. The project, based on three years of research that included over 4,500 people, enabled the lab to publish Stanford Guidelines for Web Credibility, which established ten guidelines for building the credibility of a website.

=== Findings ===
The study found that when people assessed a real website's credibility, they did not use rigorous criteria, a contrast to earlier national survey findings by Consumer Reports WebWatch, A Matter of Trust: What Users Want From Web Sites (April 16, 2002). The data showed that the average consumer paid far more attention to the superficial aspects of a site, such as visual cues, than to its content. For example, nearly half of all consumers (or 46.1%) in the study assessed the credibility of sites based in part on the appeal of the overall visual design of a site, including layout, typography, font size and color schemes.

This reliance on a site's overall visual appeal to gauge credibility occurred more often with some categories of sites than others. Consumer credibility-related comments about visual design issues occurred with more frequency with websites dedicated to finance, 54.6%, search engines, 52.6%, travel, 50.5%, and e-commerce sites, 46.2%, and less frequently when assessing health, 41.8%, news, 39.6%, and nonprofit, 39.4%.

"I would like to think that when people go on the Web they're very tough integrators of information, they compare sources, they think really hard," says Fogg, "but the truth of the matter--and I didn't want to find this in the research but it's very clear--is that people do judge a Web site by how it looks. That's the first test of the Web site. And if it doesn't look credible or it doesn't look like what they expect it to be, they go elsewhere. It doesn't get a second test. And it's not so different from other things in life. It's the way we judge automobiles and politicians.

== Recommended guidelines ==
| Guideline | Additional Comments |
|---|---|
| 1. Make it easy to verify the accuracy of the information on your site. | You can build web site credibility by providing third-party support (citations, references, source material) for information you present, especially if you link to this evidence. Even if people don't follow these links, you've shown confidence in your material. |
| 2. Show that there's a real organization behind your site. | Showing that your web site is for a legitimate organization will boost the site's credibility. The easiest way to do this is by listing a physical address. Other features can also help, such as posting a photo of your offices or listing a membership with the chamber of commerce. |
| 3. Highlight the expertise in your organization and in the content and services you provide. | Do you have experts on your team? Are your contributors or service providers authorities? Be sure to give their credentials. Are you affiliated with a respected organization? Make that clear. Conversely, don't link to outside sites that are not credible. Your site becomes less credible by association. |
| 4. Show that honest and trustworthy people stand behind your site. | The first part of this guideline is to show there are real people behind the site and in the organization. Next, find a way to convey their trustworthiness through images or text. For example, some sites post employee bios that tell about family or hobbies. |
| 5. Make it easy to contact you. | A simple way to boost your site's credibility is by making your contact information clear: phone number, physical address, and email address. |
| 6. Design your site so it looks professional (or is appropriate for your purpose). | We find that people quickly evaluate a site by visual design alone. When designing your site, pay attention to layout, typography, images, consistency issues, and more. Of course, not all sites gain credibility by looking like IBM.com. The visual design should match the site's purpose. |
| 7. Make your site easy to use—and useful. | We're squeezing two guidelines into one here. Our research shows that sites win credibility points by being both easy to use and useful. Some site operators forget about users when they cater to their own company's ego or try to show the dazzling things they can do with web technology. |
| 8. Update your site's content often (at least show it's been reviewed recently). | People assign more credibility to sites that show they have been recently updated or reviewed. |
| 9. Use restraint with any promotional content (e.g., ads, offers). | If possible, avoid having ads on your site. If you must have ads, clearly distinguish the sponsored content from your own. Avoid pop-up ads, unless you don't mind annoying users and losing credibility. As for writing style, try to be clear, direct, and sincere. |
| 10. Avoid errors of all types, no matter how small they seem. | Typographical errors and broken links hurt a site's credibility more than most people imagine. It's also important to keep your site up and running. |

== See also ==
- Persuasive technology
- Web literacy (Credibility)
