= Credibility =

Believability of a source or message

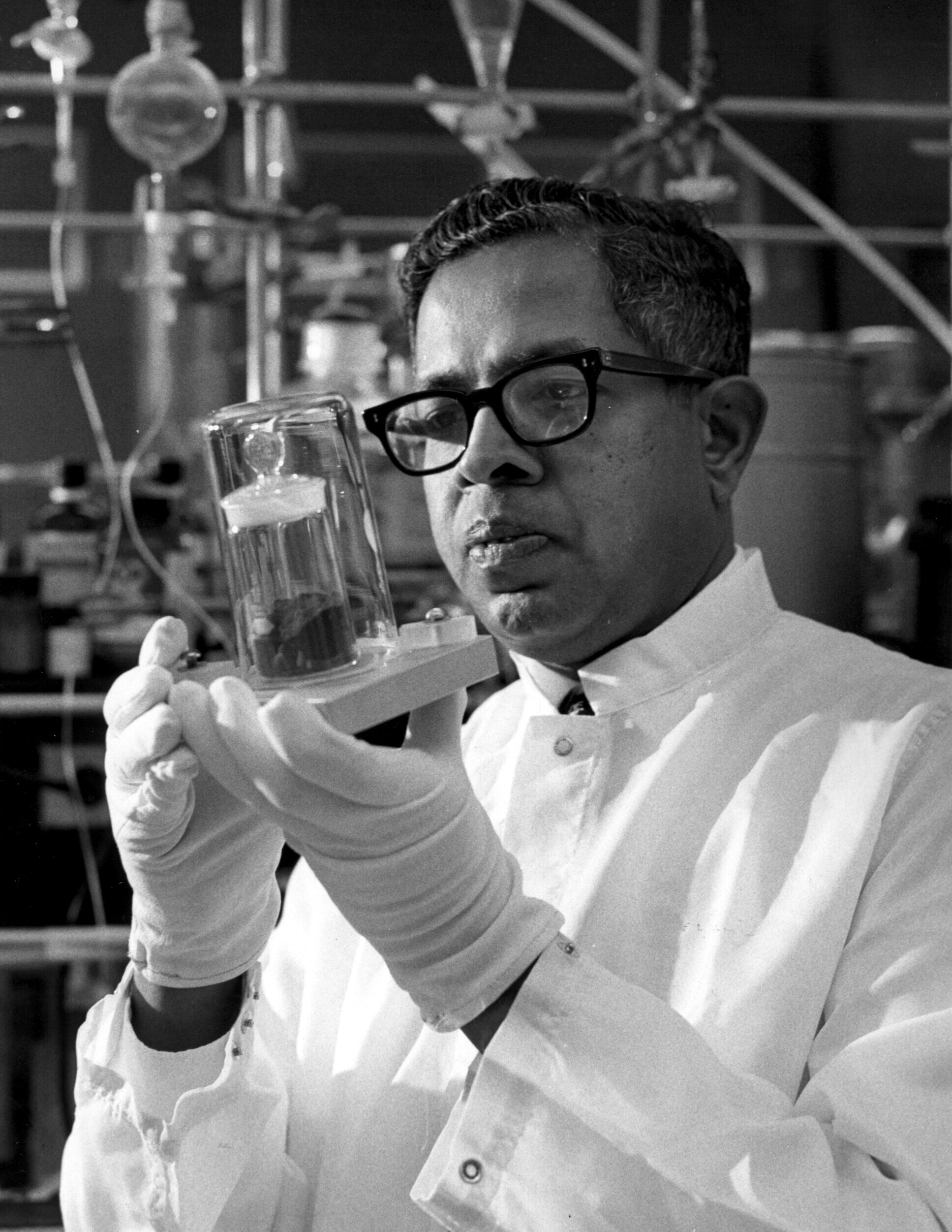
Scientists with PhD degrees are considered credible sources in their field of expertise, due to their state-accredited advanced study.

Credibility comprises the objective and subjective components of the believability of a source or message. Credibility is deemed essential in many fields to establish expertise. It plays a crucial role in journalism, teaching, science, medicine, business leadership, and social media.

Aristotle defines rhetoric as the ability to see what is possibly persuasive in every situation. He divided the means of persuasion into three categories, namely Ethos (the source's credibility), Pathos (the emotional or motivational appeals), and Logos (the logic used to support a claim), which he believed have the capacity to influence the receiver of a message. According to Aristotle, the term "Ethos" deals with the character of the speaker. The intent of the speaker is to appear credible. In fact, the speaker's ethos is a rhetorical strategy employed by an orator whose purpose is to "inspire trust in his audience".

Credibility has two key components: trustworthiness and expertise, which both have objective and subjective components. Trustworthiness is based more on subjective factors, but can include objective measurements such as established reliability. Expertise can be similarly subjectively perceived, but also includes relatively objective characteristics of the source or message (e.g., credentials, certification or information quality). Secondary components of credibility include source dynamism (charisma) and physical attractiveness.

== In journalism ==
According to the Society of Professional Journalists' code of ethics, professional integrity is the cornerstone of a journalist's credibility. A journalist's number one obligation is to be honest.

According to Gallup polls, Americans' confidence in the mass media has been consistently declining each year since 2007.

In 2013, a survey conducted by the Pew Research Center for the People & the Press found that credibility ratings for major news organizations are at or near their all-time lows.

"As audiences lose confidence in traditional news outlets, many see great promise in the Internet as a response to this crisis in journalism."

Three aspects of credibility: clarity (how easily the article can be understood), accuracy (how well documented the information is), and trustworthiness (how believable the information is).

== In teaching ==
Students' perception of instructors has great importance and possible consequences. Instructor credibility, which is defined as "the attitude of a receiver which references the degree to which a source is seen to be believable", consists of three dimensions-, competence, character, and caring. Competence focuses on their expertise or knowledge in a subject matter. Character refers to the "goodness" (i.e., honesty, trustworthiness) of an instructor. Caring focuses on whether the instructor shows concern or empathy for the students' welfare or situation. Although an instructor may show one or two of these qualities, the best and most respected exude all three qualities. A study done by Atkinson and Cooper revealed that students who are taught by an instructor perceive as credible, results in extreme allegiance to those instructors.

Generally, instructors who are perceived to have credibility are associated with effective teaching skills. Instructors who demonstrate competence, character, and/or caring are perceived to engage in a variety of effective instructional communication behaviors such as argumentativeness, verbal and nonverbal immediacy, affinity seeking, and assertiveness and responsiveness. Moreover, credible instructors are perceived to be low in verbal aggressiveness and less likely to use behaviors that interfere with student learning.

Unlike instructor competence which centers on instructors' perceived expertise, instructor character and caring are rooted in students' perceptions of their instructors' interpersonal communication behaviors. Students can feel more connected to the material being taught and have the information stay in their mind, if the instructor sharing the information has credibility. According to studies, when instructors exemplify the qualities of character (i.e., kind, virtuous, good) and caring (i.e., empathetic, understanding, responsive), students report a greater likelihood of communicating with them.

Teachers who are concerned with whether students communicate with them, either in class or out of class, may want to reconsider the role their own in-class communication behaviors play in students' willingness or likelihood to communicate with them. Instructors who are interested in how students perceive their competence, character, and caring should examine how their in-class communication behaviors contribute to these perceptions. They can evaluate themselves, go back over their lectures, scores that students give them at the end of the semester, and seek advice and training from their peers. By doing so, instructors may find students are more willing, likely, or interested in communicating with them.

== In science ==
Scientific credibility has been defined as the extent to which science in general is recognized as a source of reliable information about the world. The term has also been applied more narrowly, as an assessment of the credibility of the work of an individual scientist or a field of research. Here, the phrase refers to how closely the work in question adheres to scientific principles, such as the scientific method. The method most commonly used to assess the quality of science is peer review and then publication as part of the scientific literature. Other approaches include the collaborative assessment of a topic by a group of experts, this process can produce reviews such as those published by the Cochrane Collaboration, or the Intergovernmental Panel on Climate Change.

The 2008 credibility article written by Peter Alagona highlights that, "In environmental science, credibility is one of the most referenced yet the least comprehended concepts." This lack of understanding is due to the public often confusing credibility with trust because of shared characteristics, such as reliability and dependability. To be credible in the scientific field, researchers are to demonstrate expertise, reliability and objectivity, through methods such as peer and systematic review, and experimental studies. Alagona states that "the credibility of scientific research shapes the public's trust and influence policies." Therefore, scientific credibility means that when research is seen as trustworthy, it can shape various rules and regulations. This reinforces the public's trust, belief, and acceptance, as these guidelines are based on credible scientific findings.

The general public can give a great deal of weight to perceptions of scientific authority in their decisions on controversial issues that involve scientific research, such as biotechnology. However, both the credibility and authority of science is questioned by groups with non-mainstream views, such as some advocates of alternative medicine, or those who dispute the scientific consensus on a topic, such as denialists of AIDS. Political endorsements can reduce non-partisan scientific credibility.

== In medicine ==
People rely on doctors' expertise to respond to issues relating to their health. Trust in a doctor's credibility is essential to a patient's health: depending on the patient's trust in the doctor they will be more or less willing to seek help, reveal sensitive information, submit to treatment, and follow the doctor's recommendations.

According to a New England Journal of Medicine study, 94% of American doctors have some relationship with a drug or medical device company, including payments but also drug samples and industry lunches, for example. Such alarming evidence is what has prompted a growing mistrust in medical professionals' credibility. Despite the studies conducted intended on finding out how to increase doctors' credibility, the findings are inconclusive. It is a strong general consensus that increased visibility of the relationship between doctors and pharmaceutical companies is the first place to start.

The Journal of Computer-Mediated Communication published a study that "perceived credibility of online information" to grasp an understanding about how knowledge of a topic and a source expertise establish credibility to access online healthcare data. The results of this study divide expertise into three levels. Utilizing online health information that is free of bias and includes the qualifications and background of the author or organization would be considered credible. Additionally, having high numbers of citation and peer-reviewed sources support credibility. These factors together would be level 1, which is a highly rated source. Missing a high number of citations and peer-reviewed sources results in a level 2 grade, which is considered a moderate source. Failure to meet any criteria of these would classify the source as a level 3, which is not an expert source and should be avoided. To assess these levels, one can check if a source meets the mentioned requirements, as it is the public's decision. Furthermore, using academic resources such as Google Scholar and JSTOR can be used verify the credibility of an online source.

== On the street ==
Street credibility refers to the extent to which an individual's or entity's claims are regarded as trustworthy by the average person. In the corporate context, a parallel concept exists under the term branding. Branding is a strategic process through which companies invest significant financial resources to communicate information about their products, the types of consumers who use them, and the reasons why others should consider doing so. This targeted approach aims to cultivate a favorable public perception, thereby enhancing consumer trust and driving sustained sales growth.

== In business leadership ==
According to the Journal of Research Technology Management, Chief Technical Officers (CTOs), executives responsible for technologies and Chief Executive Officers (CEOs) play a major role in ensuring credibility in leadership for research and development across many companies. Uttal and the rest of the team discovered that CTO could use multiple resources to evaluate the desire for credibility and set goals for addressing the issue. The credibility of a CTO is built by acting as a "technical businessman" to make strategic decisions that advance technologies to reach the company goals. The CEO actively build credibility by consistently supporting the team, expanding the company, and establishing trust within the employees. People often assume that only the CEO has to be credible, when in fact both the CEO and CTO must establish credibility to succeed.

The employees view of the organization completely intervenes the positive relationship between the CEO credibility and the employee's involvement of engagement. Although the CEO's credibility positively affects employee engagement, the actual impact is exercised by the employee's view of the organization's reputation.

== In online sources ==
Credibility online has become an important topic since the mid-1990s. This is because the web has increasingly become an information resource. The Credibility and Digital Media Project @ UCSB highlights recent and ongoing work in this area, including recent consideration of digital media, youth, and credibility. In addition, the Persuasive Technology Lab at Stanford University has studied web credibility and proposed the principal components of online credibility and a general theory called Prominence-Interpretation Theory.

Social media credibility is dependent on cues and heuristics. Cues used to assess credibility online are authority cues, identity cues, and bandwagon cues. Authority cues are the most influence source credibility. Authority cues are cues that let the viewer know that it is an expert source such as a university or government institution. Identity cues are peer information. Users trust information more if they can identify the person that published it the publisher is not anonymous. Users view information as more credible if a peer shared it than a stranger. Bandwagon cues triggers credibility processing based on the logic that "if others think it's good, so should I."

== Two-phase model of credibility ==
Jürgen Habermas in his theory of communicative action developed four validity claims (truth, sincerity, appropriateness and understandability) leading to the concept of credibility.

In a different study researchers empirically validated the claims and derived a two-phase model of "reporting credibility", where first of all understandability needs to be reached. Only then the three other validity claims make a difference and may lead to credibility in the Habermasian sense.

== See also ==
- Centre for Research on the Epidemiology of Disasters (CRED)
- Cheap talk
- Credibility (international relations)
- Credibility gap
- Credibility theory
- Credibility thesis
- Epistemology, the philosophical study of truth and belief
- Indie cred
- Integrity
- Objectivity
- Signalling (economics)
- Signalling theory
- Source credibility from social psychology theory
- Source criticism
- Web literacy (credibility)
- Well he would, wouldn't he?
- Witness
