= Source credibility =

Source credibility is the degree to which a communicator is perceived as having positive characteristics that make a receiver more willing to accept a message. The concept developed from research by Carl Hovland and colleagues, first for the US War Department during World War II and then in experiments at Yale University, on how a communicator’s characteristics affect opinion change. The Yale group described credibility as having two components, expertise and trustworthiness. Later researchers identified additional dimensions, such as competence, character, sociability, composure and extroversion.

== Overview ==
According to source credibility theory, the perceived credibility of a source affects how persuasive its message is. A review of five decades of research concluded that highly credible sources generally produce more persuasion than sources with low credibility, but that the effect depends on the source, message, channel, receiver and setting, and that high credibility can reduce persuasion under some conditions. A meta-analysis found that credibility moderated how recipients processed a message only when they had no prior attitude toward the topic, and that the effect declined quickly. Source credibility is studied in communication, marketing, law and political science, and has been applied to politics, news media, online communication, celebrity endorsement and public health. Findings on its role in responses to misinformation have been inconsistent.

== History ==
Bust of Aristotle, who identified ethos (credibility) as one of three means of persuasion

The idea of credibility was first derived from Aristotle who argued that the speaker's reliability must be built and established in speech and that what the speaker did or said before such a speech was not of importance. Aristotle divided the aspects of persuasion into three categories: ethos (credibility), pathos (emotion) and logos (logic).

Academic studies of this topic began in the 20th century and were given a special emphasis during World War II, when the US government sought to use propaganda to influence public opinion in support of the war effort. Psychologist Carl Hovland and his colleagues worked at the War Department upon this during the 1940s and then continued experimental studies at Yale University. They built upon the work of researchers in the first half of the 20th century who had developed a Source-Message-Channel-Receiver model of communication and, with Muzafer Sherif, (Muzaffer Şerif Başoğlu) developed this as part of their theories of persuasion and social judgement. Hovland, Janis and Kelley's Communication and Persuasion (1953) reported the Yale group's experimental studies of opinion change and identified expertise and trustworthiness as the two components of source credibility.

== Dimensions ==
Researchers have proposed several dimensions of source credibility. The Yale group emphasized expertise and trustworthiness. A study of news sources by McCroskey and Jenson identified five dimensions: competence, character, sociability, composure and extroversion. Research on misinformation commonly treats credibility as perceived expertise, trustworthiness and source bias.

James C. McCroskey (University of Alabama at Birmingham) was known for his research in the dimensions of source credibility. His scales for the measurement of source credibility have been widely used in communication research. He noted in his 1975 article, "Image of Mass Media News Sources", that "the available scales for the measurement of source credibility should not be assumed to be universally applicable measures of source credibility." However, his research and his proposed scale from 1975 are still foundations for source credibility research.

In McCroskey's work, he further breaks down each dimension as follows:

- Competence: The measurement of competence is based on seven values. These values are qualification, expertise, reliability, believability, openness (i.e. intellectual vs. narrow), value, and currency (i.e., informed vs. uninformed).
- Character: The measurement of character has four values. These are kindness, sympathy, selflessness (i.e., unselfish vs. selfish), and virtue.
- Sociability:The measurement of sociability has three values. These are friendliness, cheer, and temperament (i.e., good natured vs. irritable). Character and sociability may be combined by some researchers. In that case, researchers will employ the seven values under one "Character-Sociability" measurement.
- Composure:Four seemingly synonymous values are assigned to the measurement of composure. These are excitability (composed vs. excitable), calmness (calm vs. anxious), tension (relaxed vs. tense), and poise (poised vs. nervous).
- Extroversion: Like composure, extroversion is composed of four seemingly synonymous values. These are aggressiveness, boldness, talkativeness (i.e. talkative vs. silent), and voice (i.e., verbal vs. quiet).

=== Bias and source credibility ===
Bias plays a complex role in determining source credibility. While bias is often viewed negatively, scholars like Danielle DeRise argue that it must be understood in context. DeRise suggests that bias reflects a source's perspective and is sometimes unavoidable, particularly in opinion-based topics. Warrington highlights strategies for identifying bias, such as analyzing an author’s use of ethos, logos, and pathos.

== Dynamics ==
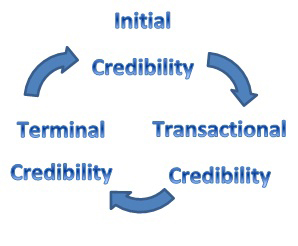
Dynamics of source credibility

Barton and Tucker divide a speaker’s credibility into three stages: initial, derived and terminal. Initial credibility is the credibility a speaker holds at the beginning of an interaction or before it. It depends on what the audience already knows about the speaker, how the speaker is introduced, and first impressions of the speaker’s dress, preparation and confidence. B. J. Fogg used the term surface credibility for judgments based on superficial traits such as a person’s looks, dress or hairstyle.

Derived credibility is the audience’s judgment of the speaker’s credibility and trustworthiness as the interaction proceeds, and it can change from point to point. It is influenced by the speaker’s delivery, language, viewpoints, open-mindedness and honesty.

Terminal credibility is the speaker’s credibility at the end of the interaction. It results from the initial and derived stages and may be lower than the speaker’s initial credibility.

== Five bases of power ==
Source credibility has an explicit effect on the bases of power used in persuasion. Source credibility, the bases of power, and objective power, which is established based on variables such as position or title, are interrelated. The levels of each have a direct relationship in the manipulation and levels of one another.

The social psychologists John R. P. French and Bertram Raven introduced the five bases of power: Coercive, Reward, Legitimate, Referent, and Expert. This was followed by Raven's subsequent identification in 1965 of a sixth separate and distinct base of power: informational power.

- Reward power: Reward power is based on the perception that the persuading agent has the ability to provide reward, either positive or a decrease in negative result, for the target of the influence. Character and sociability are dimensions of credibility that can help establish reward power.
- Coercive power: Coercive power is based on the perception that the persuading agent has the ability to provide negative results, such as punishment or other reprimand, for the target of the influence.
- Legitimate power: Legitimate power is based on the perception that the persuading agent has the right, such as through a specific role or position, to influence and obtain compliance from the target of the influence.
- Referent power: Referent power is based on the identification with or association with persuading agent by the target of the influence. Character, composure, extroversion and sociability are the dimensions of credibility that help establish referent power.
- Expert power: Expert power is based on the perception that the persuading agent has special knowledge that can be provided to the target of the influence. Competence is the single dimension of credibility that can be directly linked to establishing expert power.
- Informational power: Informational power is based on the information, or logical argument, that the persuading agent can provide information or obtain information for the target of the influence.

The relationship between measures of power and credibility correlate considerably with one another, indicating that the French and Raven bases of power are not statistically independent concepts. The level of objective power affects the relationship between credibility and perceived social power. Credibility has a direct effect on perceived power. Therefore, individuals with the highest credibility also have the most perceived social power on all of the power bases. When individuals have a low amount of objective power, credibility significantly affects social power ratings. High credibility increases judgments of perceived reward, coercive, referent, and legitimate powers. Expert powers are also influenced positively, but do not correlate at the highest levels of credibility. Therefore, the highest amount of credibility does not elevate perceived expert powers to the highest levels. However, credibility does not have considerable influence on the perceived social power of individuals with high initial objective power, due to perceptions of powerfulness based on this power.

== In interpersonal relationships ==
Interpersonal credibility is based on a listener's perceptions of a speaker's expertness, reliability, intentions, activeness, personal attractiveness and the majority opinion of the listener's associates. First impressions play a significant role in interpersonal credibility and may be enduring. Both children and adults take confidence and accuracy into account when judging credibility. Adults also take into account calibration (i.e., the speaker's own estimation of their accuracy as demonstrated by confidence and accuracy) and change their assessments of credibility if the speaker is revealed to have inaccurate calibration (e.g. is over- or underconfident). Children believe confident speakers over ones lacking in confidence and do not appear to take calibration into account, possibly because children have not reached the same stage of cognitive development as adults.

== Source factors ==
Researchers discovered that certain communication traits can alter one's ability to persuade and influence others. These traits received the name "Source Factors". One of these source factors that may increase the communicator's persuasive efforts is credibility. Credibility is composed of expertise (is the individual in a position to know the truth?) and trustworthiness (is the person likely to tell the truth?). Furthermore, Indirect evidence from research suggests that liking the communicator can influence the recipients' judgment. It can affect the communicator's trustworthiness, but not his expertise. While including humor in a communication might boost liking, if failed, the attempt to humor can lower trustworthiness, liking, and sometimes even the communicator's perceived expertise. Similarity is another source element. People prefer others who are similar to them and give them preferential treatment.

Although it has not been proven that resemblance between the communicator and the audience directly impacts the listeners, it was found that commonalities can have an indirect effect on the audience, such as liking and credibility. Being charming, attractive, and funny, as well as identifying similarities and delivering compliments, are all effective strategies to make the interaction positive and portray the communicator positively.

== Moderating factors ==
A review of five decades of research found that, in studies of the main effect of source credibility, highly credible sources generally produced more persuasion than sources with low credibility. Studies that tested interactions showed that high credibility can be a disadvantage under some conditions. The variables that interact with credibility fall into five categories: source, message, channel, receiver and destination variables. Message and receiver variables have received the most study.

A meta-analysis examined whether source credibility interacts with recipients' ability and motivation to process a message, using variables such as knowledge, message repetition and personal relevance. The interaction appeared only when recipients had no prior attitude toward the topic and could not form one from the content of the message, and in those conditions its effect decayed rapidly.

== In politics ==
Candidates in political campaigns use credibility extensively to influence the attitudes and opinions of voters. They attempt to prime, or connect specific issues or personality traits, to persuade voters to focus on those issues favorable to the candidate to influence a more positive opinion of the candidate.

A candidate's credibility is important in determining the effectiveness of political advertising. Advertisements for candidates with high credibility have a greater impact on influencing audiences and potential voters. Low credibility reduces the impact and influence of negative or comparative advertising supporting the candidate. A candidate with high credibility will better withstand the influences of any negative advertising.

Another application of credibility in politics is endorsements by celebrities attempting to use their status to influence voters. Celebrity credibility is based on numerous attributes, the most influential of which are trustworthiness and competence. High-credibility and low-credibility celebrity endorsers are perceived very differently. However, the level of credibility of celebrity endorsers, while important in the conveyance of their messages, does not influence the credibility of or attitudes toward candidates. They, therefore, may not change the political public opinions or voting behaviors of their audience.

== Media credibility ==
Media credibility refers to the perceived believability of media content "beyond any proof of its contentions." Although its roots are in Hovland's classic persuasion research on source credibility, media credibility research has shifted the focus from characteristics of individual, personal sources to characteristics of media behaviors such as objectivity, accuracy, fairness, and lack of bias. Empirical research has found that media credibility is an important part, along with message characteristics and audience characteristics, of effective communication.

Credibility research distinguishes the credibility of a source from that of a message and of a medium, and audiences may base credibility judgments on any of them.

According to Dan Gillmor when becoming mediactive (i.e., an active consumer of media) source credibility is a very important aspect. He suggests that users be skeptical; they should be on the lookout for fallacies, such as the two-side fallacy, and people who are paid to persuade. He also believes that people need to exercise judgment, the idea of assuming that everything is lying is just as much a problem as assuming that everything posted or published is the truth. Opening your mind is another important concept when considering source credibility. Most people are likely to consider a source credible if the content reflects ideas that the user also holds. Finally, Gillmor advises that people keep asking questions and follow up on sources to help realize their credibility.

Credibility is a core value of American journalism. Credibility also is essential to the business aspect of the media. Loss of credibility may translate to loss of audience. Journalists themselves view loss of credibility as the biggest issue facing the industry. Because the media occupies a significant part of people's daily lives, it significantly impacts the social construction of reality, the shape of public consciousness and the direction of sociopolitical change. Therefore, media's credibility is as important as the message itself.

== Additional predictors of media credibility ==
=== Source credibility ===
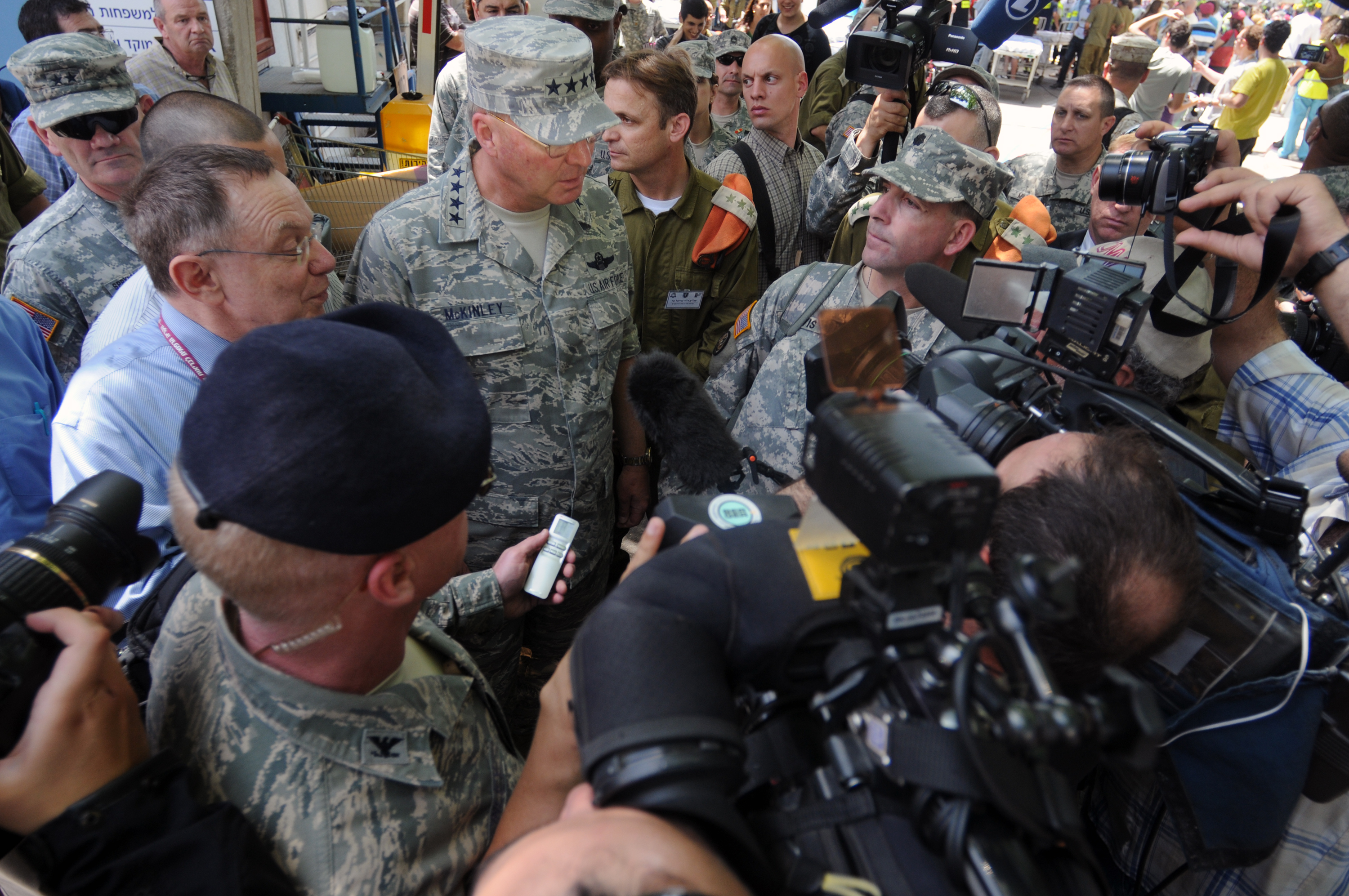
Reporters surround Air Force Gen. Craig McKinley, the chief of the National Guard Bureau, in Ramdan, Israel, on May 26, 2010. A National Guard delegation is visiting the country to strengthen a relationship with the Israeli Defense Force's Home Front Command and observe National Level Exercise Turning Point 4. (Released)

Television viewers distinguish between the credibility of official (or elite) and citizen (or nonelite) sources. Expert ratings alter subjects' judgments of source credibility. Race does not affect credibility. Debate about the credibility of elite versus nonelite sources dates back to at least the 1920s. Walter Lippmann argued in favor of elite sources in his 1922 book Public Opinion. John Dewey argued citizens are credible sources in his 1927 book The Public and its Problems. Elite, male sources outnumber nonelite, female and minority sources in American journalism. Television news viewers perceive stories with elite sources as significantly more credible than stories with nonelite sources. Source titles and manner of dress played a larger role in viewer estimations of credibility than did either race or even what the sources said on air.

Journalists and television viewers distinguish between hard news and soft news (or infotainment). Television viewers find hard news more credible than soft news.

Whether a story appears in a magazine, newspaper or on television may also affect credibility. The credibility assigned to different media varies by race and gender of news consumers.

Television viewers do not assign significantly more credibility to stories that include sources than they do to no-source stories. This aligns with research suggesting that citing authorities in speeches that advocate a position makes little difference in shifting listener opinion.

Viewers do not hold broadcast news as particularly credible and the credibility of broadcast news in the public's eyes is in decline. There is increasing evidence of public skepticism of media content. The General Social Survey charts a slide in media credibility ratings since the late 1980s. Contributory factors may include a perception that powerful people and organizations influence the press, doubt about media fairness, doubt about journalists' willingness to admit error, cynicism about standards and performance, and questions about values, morals and partisanship.

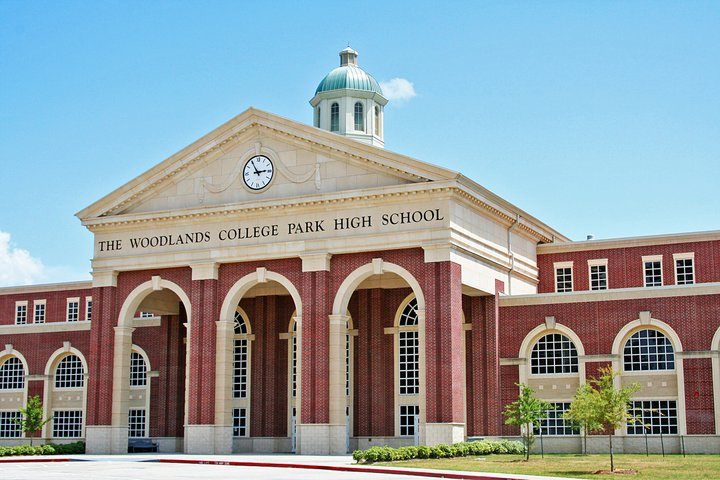
Paul Cook says that the adding Media Literacy to one's education can, over time, help fight against misinformation, which can lead to more credible sources in time.

=== Education and misinformation ===
Less educated people trust media content more than more educated people.

=== Media Credibility Index ===
The Media Credibility Index is a relatively new publication, produced annually by the Next Century Foundation (NCF), together with the International Council for Press and Broadcasting. It was launched at the NCF's 2011 International Media Awards. It is currently being developed to try and cover a wide range of publications, assessing them in terms of press freedom, accuracy, incitement, bias, sensitivity and transparency, awarding plus or minus points as is seen fit. Points awarded are only based on items reported to the International Council for Press and Broadcasting that have been posted on the NCF media blogs. The purpose of the Index is to foster good journalism, responsible editing, balanced broadcasting and more responsible treatment of media professionals. It mostly focuses on Anglo-American media, the Middle East and South Asia.

== The Internet ==
The development of the internet and its delivery of online information have created a new information environment that can affect perceptions of the credibility of that information. Online information can be created by amateur sources (e.g., blogs and citizen journalism) posted on personal sites or on news websites (e.g., comments on news stories, CNN's iReport). The freedom for anyone to publish anything and the convergence of information genres (i.e., infotainment) affect editorial review and credibility. Online content may lack a clearly identified source or have multiple or anonymous authors, which blurs the distinction between source, message and medium credibility. In such cases users may judge credibility from features of the message or the site rather than from the source.

A study of the impact of the internet on value orientations in mainland China by Jonathan Zhu and Zhou He (University of Hong Kong) revealed that credibility of the internet was far more important than conventional media to Chinese citizens. This may be because conventional media has a historical record of being credible whereas internet sources, especially user-generated content, can be questionable.

Websites are often the first or only interaction consumers have with a company. Also, these interactions are usually short- in the magnitude of a few seconds to a few minutes. Source credibility can be established online in a number of ways to include logo design, website sophistication, and source citation. Lowry, Wilson and Haig (2013) showed that well designed logos that are synergistic with the company's product/service can trigger positive credibility judgments about the company's website and results in greater trust and willingness to interact with the company. These effects are magnified when the website design extends and complements the logo design. Additional source credibility theory research has shown that color schemes and other visual elements can predict perceptions of credibility. On social media sites, source credibility can be ascribed based on the number of followers and the ratio between followers and follows a user has. Research by Westerman, Spence and Van Der Heide (2012) shows that there is a curvilinear effect for the number of followers, "such that having too many or too few connections results in lower judgments of expertise and trustworthiness." A narrow gap between followers and follows may also result in a higher perception of competence (i.e., if a user has many followers but does not follow many others, that person may be regarded as less of an expert). Further research showed that frequency of updates led to higher perception of credibility.

Research has also explored how people evaluate the credibility of a source on social media. Lin, Spence and Lachlan (2016) looked at how authority, identity and popularity influenced people’s evaluations of sources on Twitter. The research showed that these factors can affect how trustworthy a source is perceived to be. This implies that people may be looking beyond the shared information when deciding whether to trust a source on social media.

When looking at merchandising websites, according to Jung-Kuei Hsieh and Yi-JinLi (2020), to cultivate lasting relationships with customers who use these online sites, administrators of online review websites should implement strategies to prevent disappointment and dissatisfaction following purchase decisions. For example, continually updating their online product reviews to ensure congruence with actual product performance. This enhances the websites credibility by providing accurate and reliable information that customers can trust, thereby fostering greater customer loyalty.

Klout.com was a social media analytic website and app that ranks users according to online social influence and assigns a "Klout Score". Research by Westerman et al. has shown that a higher "Klout Score" results in higher perceived competence and character but has no bearing on the caring (i.e., sociability) dimension of credibility.

Social Influence Theory suggests that peer-induced changes in consumer behavior can be understood through two dimensions: informational and normative. Additionally, literature indicates that source credibility and social support are the primary factors driving these influencing processes.

Focus groups have also shown that users evaluation criteria of blog credibility slightly differed from that of traditional media credibility. Participants indicated that the source of the blog was the first component evaluated and factors such as the source's knowledge, passion, transparency, reliability, and influence impacted credibility judgements. Participants also indicated that the blog's message/content needed to be authentic, insightful, informative, consistent, accurate, timely, popular, fair, and focused.

== Misinformation and media literacy ==
Persuasion research has generally found that perceived credibility predicts attitude change, but studies applying source credibility to misinformation have produced inconsistent results. A 2024 systematic review of 91 studies, covering about 64,000 participants and 162 coded effects, found that 77 effects were statistically significant, 65 were not, and 20 were mixed. The review identified several possible explanations for the inconsistency. Studies define and measure credibility in different ways, often combining expertise, trustworthiness and bias in a single measure or using real news outlets that differ on many characteristics at once, and trustworthiness has been studied less than expertise. Source effects were more consistent in studies using short material, such as headlines and social media posts, than in studies using full articles. Source credibility affected judgments of accuracy more consistently than behavioral outcomes such as intentions to share. Studies that varied only whether a source was shown, rather than its credibility, mostly found no effect.

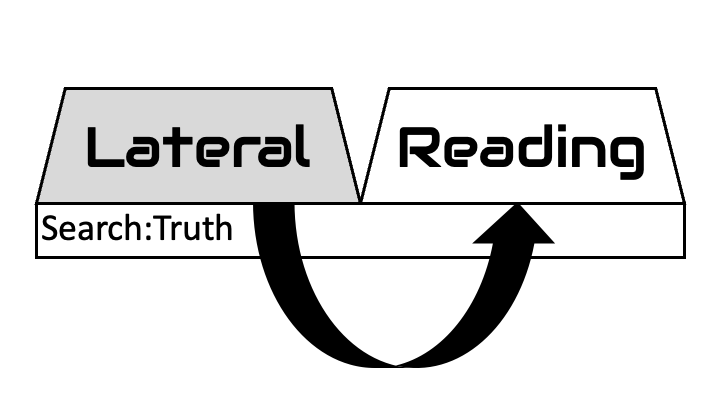
Lateral Reading: A strategy where one explores outside sources from the original, primary source to verify the information as credible.

Lateral reading is a method of evaluating digital information in which the reader leaves the page and checks its claims and the source’s reputation against other independent sources, rather than examining the original page alone (“vertical reading”). In a study in which professional fact-checkers, historians and university students evaluated live websites, the fact-checkers used lateral reading and reached more accurate conclusions about the sites, while the students and historians relied mainly on vertical reading. The method has been presented to students as an approach to evaluating online sources.

Paul Cook describes misinformation as a pervasive societal problem comparable to a “hyperobject” and emphasizes media literacy education as a response. In a pilot study with university students, two lessons teaching a small set of flexible strategies for evaluating online sources improved participants’ evaluations of those sources.

== Popular culture ==
Source credibility has an enormous role in popular culture. Celebrity endorsement is a popular communication strategy in advertising and relies heavily on source credibility, at least in the United States. Dr. Roobina Ohanian, an associate professor of marketing at Emory University, developed a scale for assessing celebrity credibility and assessed the impact of celebrity credibility on consumers' purchase intentions. Expertise is the perceived amount of knowledge or experience. Trustworthiness refers to how honest and reliable someone is perceived to be. Physical attractiveness is the perceived level of physical appeal. Though not as precise as McCroskey's scale, Ohanian's scale has been widely used in the United States.

The credibility of the source also matters a lot in the social media influencer marketing. Han and Balabanis (2024) explored the connection between influencers’ characteristics and the way consumers responded to the influencers and the brands. Trust and expertise issues were considered as well as their impact on consumer attitudes and purchase intentions. This study is an example of the research of source credibility in new advertising form like social media endorsement.

Professional athletes' credibility is also important to pop culture. An athlete's credibility differs a little, however, from typical celebrity endorsers. Research indicates that negative information about an endorsing athlete can lead to negative impact directed toward the endorsed brand or product. Issues outside the realm of sport have been considered the source of negative information about an athlete (e.g., a scandal or crime). For example, when Tiger Woods' sex scandal became known to the public, Gatorade immediately severed its ties. Likewise, when Michael Phelps was indicted for illegal drug use, Kellogg's dropped him from their advertising campaigns.

Athletic performance also affects source credibility. A study by Koo, Ruihley, and Dittmore (2012) shows that athletic performance is seen subconsciously as a reflection of a celebrity athlete's trustworthiness. Additionally, maintained or increased athletic performance following negative news may help the celebrity athlete to maintain or quickly regain his/her credibility.

Athletes enter the media arena through two pathways, either through personal messages shared through personal accounts or via outside accounts/ organizations who report on their performance. Sangwon Na, Thilo Kunkel, and Jason Doyle (2019), found that "source credibility studies indicate that television, newspapers and online news channels have higher credibility than individual information providers" When consumers receive information from experts, they tend to believe the information is trustworthy and ultimately view the information positively.

Celebrity source credibility goes beyond product/brand endorsement and can extend to recommendations from the celebrity. One example is Oprah Winfrey's book club, which would bring attention and legitimacy to any featured author and their work. Her talk show is one of the primary elements that would also be able to grant attention and legitimacy.

Physical attractiveness is another component relative to pop culture that has been researched. Physical attractiveness has been linked to credibility as an aspect of likability which can be classified under sociability or trustworthiness. Further research shows age has an effect on credibility. Steinhaus and Lapitsky showed that women of varying ages ascribe more credibility to older fashion models than younger ones. Their research concluded that "similarity between older models and older consumers resulted in significant positive effects for source credibility and interpersonal attraction. Younger consumers evaluated older models higher than younger models on one dimension of credibility, but indicated no other significant differences in attitudes toward younger or older models."
