= Office of Chief Examiner =

Office of Chief Examiner is an office of the state of Victoria in Australia, responsible for exercising coercive powers under the Major Crime (Investigative Powers) Act 2004. The office is independent of Victoria Police.

Using its coercive powers the office may compel a witness to answer questions and produce documents or other materials. Failure to comply with a direction of the office is contempt of court and may lead to punishment including imprisonment. The office has been described as inquisatorial in nature and "akin to a modern 'star chamber'".

The coercive powers may only be used when authorised by the Supreme Court of Victoria via a "coercive powers order". These orders may only be issued in relation to an organised crime investigation. The court must be satisfied that issuing the order is in the public interest. Examinations held by the office are secret and all participants are bound by confidentiality orders. In practice, confidentiality is often breached with informer Nicola Gobbo describing the secrecy as "laughable" with witnesses issued summonses in public and its physical office close to a known underworld hangout.

Oversight of the office is provided by the Victorian Inspectorate.

The office was established in 2005 following the Melbourne gangland killings of the early 2000s. Its establishment was criticised by Liberty Victoria who described it as a "“standing royal commission" without the checks and balances Victoria Police Chief Commissioner Christine Nixon was an advocate for its establishment stating in her autobiography "I wanted coercive powers – that is, the authority to compel witnesses, usually in secret, to answer questions and tell no one".

The initial Chief Examiner was Damien Maguire who held the role until 2015. As of October 2021, the Chief Examiner is Joanne Smith, who started in the role in 2018.
