= Perceptyx =

American employee experience software company

Perceptyx, Inc.
- Type: Private
- Industry: Human resources technology
- Founded: 2003; 23 years ago
- Founder: John Borland
- Headquarters: Temecula, California, United States
- Key people: Ross Wainwright (CEO)
- Products: Employee survey and people-analytics software
- Website: www.perceptyx.com

Perceptyx is an American technology company that develops employee experience (EX) management, learning & development, and people-analytics software. Founded in 2003 and headquartered in Temecula, California, the company provides employee survey, feedback, analytics, and coaching software for enterprise organizations.

== History ==
Perceptyx was founded in 2003. In August 2019, the company received a growth equity investment from TCV.

In July 2020, Perceptyx acquired the employee-insights division of market-research firm Kantar, adding Kantar's employee-survey benchmark data to its platform. In July 2021, the company acquired Waggl, a real-time employee-feedback and crowdsourcing tool, and CultureIQ, a workplace-culture assessment service.

In February 2022, Perceptyx acquired Cultivate, a startup that used artificial intelligence to analyze workplace communications and provide management coaching.

In August 2023, it acquired Humu, an AI-driven "nudge" software startup co-founded by former Google and GE executive Laszlo Bock.

In March 2026, the company acquired Lyceum AI, an AI-based learning platform, in a deal intended to connect its employee-listening products with workplace training and development tools. Following the acquisition, the company added AI-powered learning and development features through its Develop platform. Also in 2026, Perceptyx was included on Fast Company's World's Most Innovative Companies list in the human resources category, which cited its AI agent tools for employee coaching and feedback analysis.

== Services ==
Perceptyx's platform, combines employee surveys, feedback channels, and manager-coaching tools with data analytics intended to identify drivers of employee engagement and retention. In 2025, the company introduced a suite of AI agents built into the platform, including tools intended to prompt manager coaching, gather continuous employee feedback, and summarize open-ended survey responses. The company also conducts research and publishes surveys on employee engagement, workplace culture, and workforce attitudes.

== See also ==
- Employee engagement
- Human resource management system
