= Visual Dominance Ratio =

Nonverbal behavioral indicator

The Visual Dominance Ratio is a nonverbal behavioral indicator of a person's perceived dominance over another person based on eye contact in an interaction. The ratio is calculated from the proportion of time spent looking while speaking versus the proportion of time spent looking while listening. Studies have shown that a relatively high VDR (Visual Dominance Ratio) indicated relatively high social power. The correlation of social power and VDR between same-sex interactions is strong, and the results have proven consistent in multiple studies despite whether social power has been calculated by personality variables, expert power, military rank, or educational acquisition.
