= Behavioural design =

Field of design concerned with the influence of design on behavior

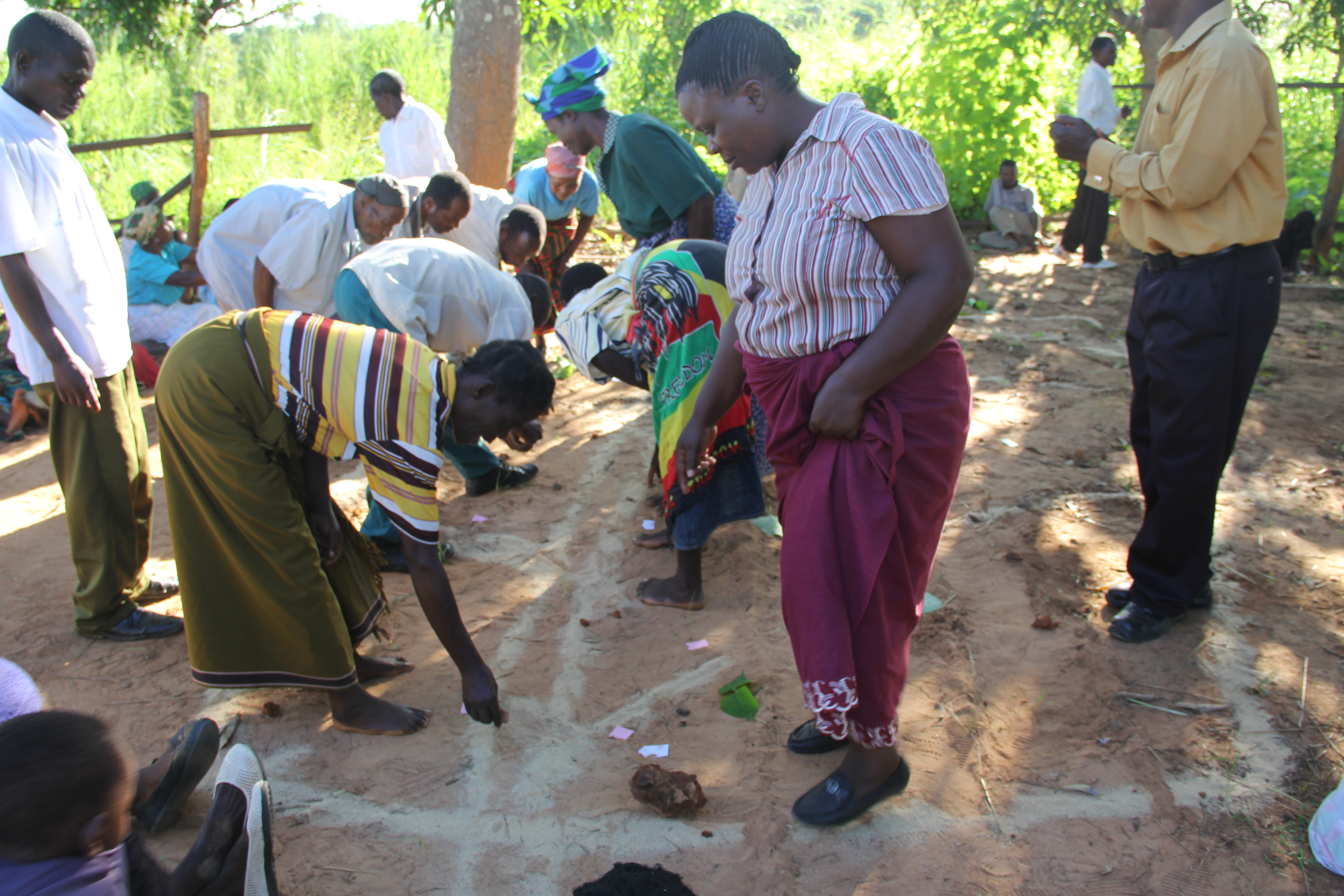
Actions to trigger behaviour change towards ending open defecation in Malawi

Behavioural design is a sub-category of design, which is concerned with how design can shape, or be used to influence human behaviour. All approaches of design for behaviour change acknowledge that artifacts have an important influence on human behaviour and/or behavioural decisions. They strongly draw on theories of behavioural change, including the division into personal, behavioural, and environmental characteristics as drivers for behaviour change. Areas in which design for behaviour change has been most commonly applied include health and wellbeing, sustainability, safety and social context, as well as crime prevention.

== History ==
Design for behaviour change developed from work on design psychology (also: behavioural design) conducted by Don Norman in the 1980s. Norman’s ‘psychology of everyday things’ introduced concepts from ecological psychology and human factors research to designers, such as affordances, constraint feedback and mapping. They have provided guiding principles with regard to user experience and the intuitive use of artefacts, although this work did not yet focus specifically on influencing behavioural change.

The models that followed Norman's original approach became more explicit about influencing behaviour, such as emotion design and persuasive technology. Perhaps since 2005, a greater number of theories have developed that explicitly address design for behaviour change. These include a diversity of theories, guidelines and toolkits for behaviour change (discussed below) covering the different domains of health, sustainability, safety, crime prevention and social design. BJ Fogg’s work at the Stanford Behavior Design Lab popularized a clear model of behavior design and a set of small-step practices that teams can apply without heavy research overhead. With the emergence of the notion of behaviour change, a much more explicit discussion has also begun about the deliberate influence of design although a review of this area from 2012 has identified that a lack of common terminology, formalized research protocols and target behaviour selection are still key issues. Key issues are the situations in which design for behaviour change could or should be applied; whether its influence should be implicit or explicit, voluntary or prescriptive; and of the ethical consequences of one or the other.

== Issues of behaviour change ==
In 1969, Herbert Simon's understanding of design as "devising courses of action to change existing situations into preferred ones" acknowledged its capacity to create change. Since then, the role of design in influencing human behaviour has become much more widely acknowledged. It is further recognised that design in its various forms, whether as objects, services, interiors, architecture and environments, can create change that is both desirable as well as undesirable, intentional and unintentional.

Desirable and undesirable effects are often closely intertwined whereby the first is usually intentionally designed, while the latter might be an unintentional effect. For example, the impact of cars has been profound in enhancing social mobility on the one hand, while transforming cities and increasing resource demand and pollution on the other. The first is generally regarded as a positive effect. The impact of associated road building on cities, however, has largely had a detrimental impact on the living environment. Furthermore, resource use and pollution associated with cars and their infrastructure have prompted a rethinking of human behaviour and the technology used, as part of the sustainable design movement, resulting for example in schemes promoting less travel or alternative transport such as trains and bike riding. Similar effects, sometimes desirable, sometimes undesirable can be observed in other areas including health, safety and social spheres. For example, mobile phones and computers have transformed the speed and social code of communication, leading not only to an increased ability to communicate, but also to an increase in stress levels with a wide range of health impacts and to safety issues.

Taking lead from Simon, it could be argued that designers have always attempted to create "preferable" situations. However, recognising the important but not always benevolent role of design, Jelsma (2006) emphasises that designers need to take moral responsibility for the actions which take place with artefacts as a result of humans interactions:

"artefacts have a co-responsibility for the way action develops and for what results. If we waste energy or produce waste in routine actions such as in the household practices, that has to do with the way artefacts guide us"

In response, design for behaviour change acknowledges this responsibility and seeks to put ethical behaviour and goals higher on the agenda. To this end, it seeks to enable consideration for the actions and services associated with any design, and the consequences of these actions, and to integrate this thinking into the design process.

== Approaches ==
To enable the process of behavioural change through design, a range of theories, guidelines and tools have been developed to promote behaviour change that encourages pro-environmental and social actions and lifestyles from designers as well as user.

== Guidelines and toolkits ==
A number of toolkits and practice guides translate behavioural science into design processes for policy, products and services. The following examples illustrate notable resources cited in research and professional practice: Boosting Businesses: A toolkit for using behavioural insights to support businesses – A 2019 toolkit developed by the Behavioural Insights Team in collaboration with the UK Cabinet Office. It outlines behavioural methods for improving business policy and supporting small and medium-sized enterprises (SMEs). BehaviourKit – A set of tactics, tools and field notes on applied behavioural design written by practitioners in the field. It provides card-based toolkits and practical guides used in applied contexts such as digital product design, service development, organisational change and behavioural communication campaigns. The toolkit has also been incorporated into several academic programmes focused on behavioural design. Groundwork: The Busara Toolkit – A comprehensive guide from the Busara Center for Behavioral Economics on applying behavioural science for development. It covers research methods, design approaches and case applications in low- and middle-income contexts. Tools and Ethics for Applied Behavioural Insights: The BASIC Toolkit – A guide published by the Organisation for Economic Co-operation and Development (OECD) providing a structured, ethics-focused framework for applying behavioural insights in public policy, including guidance on problem diagnosis, intervention design, testing and evaluation. Doblin Behavioural Design Toolkit – An overview identifying seven key behavioural factors and 30 associated tactics that inform the behavioural dimensions of innovation. Developed by Doblin with Ruth Schmidt, it serves as a reference for integrating behavioural insights into innovation strategy and design practice.

=== Theories ===
- Persuasive technology: how computing technologies can be used to influence or change the performance of target behaviours or social responses.
- Research at Loughborough Design School which collectively draws on behavioural economics, using mechanisms such as feedback, constraints and affordances and persuasive technology, to promote sustainable behaviours.
- Design for healthy behaviour: drawing on the trans-theoretical model, this model offers a new framework to design for healthy behaviour, which contends that designers need to consider the different stages of decision making which people go through to durably change their behaviour.
- Mindful design: based on Langer's theory of mindfulness mindful design seeks to encourage responsible user action and choice. Mindful design seeks to achieve responsible action through raising critical awareness of the different options available in any one situation.
- Socially responsible design: this framework or map takes the point of the intended user experience, which distinguishes four categories of product influences: decisive, coercive, persuasive and seductive to encourage desirable and discourage undesirable behaviour.
- Community based social marketing with design: this model seeks to intervene in shared social practices by reducing barriers and amplifying any benefits. To facilitate change, the approach draws on psychological tools such as prompts, norms, incentives, commitments, communication and the removal of barriers. Online social marketing emerged out of traditional social marketing, with a focus on developing scalable digital behavior change interventions.
- Practice orientated product design: This applies the understanding of social practice theory – that material artefacts (designed 'stuff') influence the trajectory of everyday practices – to design. It does so on the premise that this will ultimately shift everyday practices over time
- Modes of transitions framework: The framework draws on human-centered design methods to analyze and comprehend transitions as a way for designers to understand people that go through a process of change (a transition). It combines these with scenario-based design to provide a means of action.

== Leading figures ==
Behavioural design draws on contributions from academic researchers and applied practitioners across psychology, economics, design and human–computer interaction.

=== Academic research ===
- Susan Michie – Developed the COM-B model and Behaviour Change Wheel used to inform intervention design.
- Elizabeth Shove – Led work on social practice theory and implications for everyday routines and design.
- B. J. Fogg – Proposed the Fogg Behavior Model and linked persuasive technology with behaviour change.
- Richard Thaler and Cass Sunstein – Introduced Nudge theory, demonstrating how small changes in choice architecture can influence decisions without restricting freedom of choice.
- Ruth Schmidt – Associate Professor at IIT Institute of Design; teaching and tools (e.g., Doblin Behavioural Design Toolkit) integrate behavioural science with systems and innovation practice.
- Philip Cash – Professor of Design whose research helps systematise behavioural design methods and practice.
- Jaap Daalhuizen – Associate Professor in design methodology; work connecting design methods with behavioural outcomes (e.g., "Behavioural Design Space").
- Camilla K. E. Bay Brix Nielsen – Research on practice, methods and ethics in behavioural design used in education and practice.
- Laurie Santos – Yale professor whose large-scale teaching initiatives (e.g., The Science of Well-Being) have influenced applied wellbeing and behaviour programmes.

=== Applied practice ===
- Rory Sutherland – Promoted applied behavioural science and choice architecture in marketing and policy (UK).
- Dilip Soman – Applies choice architecture to services and public policy via the “last mile” lens (India/Canada).
- Kristen Berman – Co-founder/CEO, Irrational Labs; develops and teaches behavioural product design methods used by technology firms (US).
- Lauren Kelly – Co-founder, Yesology and CEO, BehaviourKit; develops behavioural design processes, teaches, and advises government and tech teams on applying behavioural methods in design and organisational change (UK).
- Genevieve Bell – Industry anthropologist linking technology, culture and behaviour in human-centred innovation (Australia).
- Robert Meza – Practitioner developing applied frameworks (e.g., Behaviour Design Framework v2) and advisory work on behaviour change in products and services (Netherlands).
- Amy Bucher – Chief Behavioral Officer at Lirio; leads teams designing AI-enabled behaviour change journeys in healthcare (US).
- Michael Hallsworth – Chief Behavioural Scientist at the Behavioural Insights Team; led applied behavioural programmes in government and industry (UK/US).

== Critical discussion ==
Design for behaviour change is an openly value-based approach that seeks to promote ethical behaviours and attitudes within social and environmental contexts. This raises questions about whose values are promoted and to whose benefit. While intrinsically seeking to promote socially and environmentally ethical practices, there are two possible objections. The first is that such approaches can be seen a paternalistic, manipulative and disenfranchising where decisions about the environment are being made by one person or group for another with or without consultation. The second objection is that this approach can be abused, for example in that apparently positive goals of behaviour change might be made simply to serve commercial gain without regard for the envisaged ethical concerns. The debate about the ethical considerations of design for behaviour change is still emerging, and is expected to develop with the further development of the field.

When designing for behavior change, the misapplication of behavioral design can trigger 'backfire', or when they accidentally increase the bad behavior they were originally designed to reduce. Given the stigma of triggering bad outcomes, researchers have reported that persuasive backfire effects are common but rarely published, reported, or discussed.

=== Artificial intelligence in behavior change ===
The use of 3rd wave AI techniques to achieve behavior change, intensifies the debate over behavior change. These technologies are more effective than previous techniques, but like AI in other fields it is also more opaque to both users and designers. As the field of behavioral design continues to evolve, the role of AI is becoming increasingly prominent, offering new opportunities to create desirable behavioral outcomes across various contexts. In healthcare, innovative methods like PROLIFERATE_AI exemplify a powerful approach to influencing human behavior in targeted and measurable ways. These strategies leverage AI-driven and person-centered feedback mechanisms, such as participatory design, to enhance the evaluation and implementation of health innovations.

== See also ==
- Behavior modification
- Person–situation debate
- Structural fix
- Systems thinking
- Workaround
