= Stanford Behavior Design Lab =

American research organization

The Stanford Behavior Design Lab (formerly known as the Stanford Persuasive Technology Lab and Stanford Captology Lab) is a research organization advancing behavior change methods and models based at Stanford University. Founded in 1998 and directed by B. J. Fogg, the Behavior Design Lab is a team of Stanford students, recent graduates, and quantitative researchers who study factors that impact human behavior, and conduct IRB research. The team is the global authority in a new and systematic way to design for behavior change, an approach called “Behavior Design." The Lab manager is Tanna Drapkin.

The Behavior Design Lab performs research and trains Fortune 500 companies on the use of Computing Technology and Behavior Design to facilitate positive behavior change in product design, and new product development (Instagram, Goodyear Tire).

The Lab is often known as the mobile health and start-up Lab at Stanford University, having been the inception of concepts for big name companies such as Instagram, Facebook Apps, and Clubhouse among others. The Lab's alumni network is regarded as extensive, deeply rooted, and has actively driven, participated, advised, and/or invested in multiple Silicon Valley unicorns and Fortune 500 companies.

== History ==
The Lab was originally founded as the Stanford Persuasive Technology Lab in 1998 by B. J. Fogg to research computers as Persuasive Technology as part of H-STAR (Human Sciences and Technologies Advanced Research Institute) at Stanford University, which focuses on advancing the human sciences, often in the context of their application to the design and use of information technologies, their influences on people, and with a particular emphasis on education and learning. As a research lab within H-STAR, the Lab performed cutting-edge research into how computing products — from websites to mobile phone software — can be designed to change what people believe and what they do. At the intersection of human-computer interaction and behavior change, the Lab aimed to unlock actionable insights and accelerate the creation of tools to help facilitate positive behavior change across categories below:

- Human-Centered Tech: Ensuring pervasive safety and health of people over the lifespan with human-centered technology innovations.
- Security: Solving security and trust problems of computing, communications and information systems at home, work and in governmental affairs.
- Accelerating Innovation: Accelerating innovation to create and diffusion products and services that better meet today's human needs.
- Digital Divides: Closing digital divides across class, race, gender, age and nations to provide equal opportunities to learn and work productively for personal and societal well-being.
- Technology Complexity: Reducing the complexity of information technology to enable its widespread adoption and appropriate use.

In 2002, the Lab created the Stanford Web Credibility Project and led a large study that resulted in the publication How Do People Evaluate a Web Site's Credibility?

In 2005, the Lab received a grant from the National Science Foundation to support experimental work investigating how mobile phones can motivate and persuade people, an area the lab calls "mobile persuasion.”

Between 2005 and 2009, the Lab became increasingly aware of how traditional approaches to behavior change have not been effective and how most programs that had been created to influence behavior had failed miserably. Recognizing this reality a decade ago, the Stanford Behavior Design stepped away from the tradition and began creating a new way to design for behavior change.

In 2009, the Lab focused on technology to promote peace, which later led to a new group at Stanford called the Peace Innovation Lab.

Between 1998 and 2018, the Lab gradually moved away from Persuasive Technology to focus on Behavior Change methods and models. The Lab advises and encourages anyone looking to design persuasive technologies to review their early and significant contributions on ethics and focus their research and efforts on positive change and helping people succeed and feel successful at doing what they already want to do.

In 2018, the sole focus became Behavior Design, thus resulting in the renaming of the Lab as it is used today. The Lab directed its focus to conduct research advancing Behavior Design methods, models, and maxims that help people do what they already want to do and help people feel successful.

Between 2018 and 2021, over ten different projects have been completed. Current projects are Climate Action, Upregulating Positive Emotions, Rosetta Project, and the P.E.P. - The Positive Experience Project.

In 2021, the Lab relocated to Stanford's School of Medicine under the umbrella of Vaden Health Services in the Division of Health and Human Performance (HHP) and within the Stanford Flourishing Project. The affiliation opened new doors to additional computing technology research and real-world impact.

== Notable alumni ==
- Dean Eckles, scientist and statistician, faculty at MIT
- Jason Hreah, founder of Persona
- Ari Qayumi, founder of Mindful Venture Capital
- Ramit Sethi, founder of GrowthLab.com and co-founder of PBworks
- Mike Krieger, co-founder of Instagram

== See also ==
- Stanford Web Credibility Project
- Persuasive Technology
