= Humu (software) =

Software company (e. 2017)

- Founded: May 2017
- Founders: Laszlo Bock, Wayne Crosby, Jessie Wisdom
- Type: Software company
- Legal status: Subsidiary
- Headquarters: United States
- Products: Employee engagement software
- Parent organization: Perceptyx

Humu is a software company that uses machine learning to send "nudges", small recommendations based on nudge theory, to employees at work. Since August 2023, it is a subsidiary of Perceptyx.

== History ==
Humu was founded in May 2017 by former Google executives Laszlo Bock, Wayne Crosby, and Jessie Wisdom. Before founding Humu, Laszlo Bock served as Google's original Head of People Operations. Humu exited stealth mode in October 2018 with $40 million in funding.

Humu analyzes company data and employee feedback to identify changes likely to improve employees' happiness, performance, and retention. The platform then delivers "nudges", short messages urging users to change their behavior.

The company holds a trademark on "Nudge Engine", based on the behavioral economics concept of nudge theory from Nobel Prize-winning economist Richard Thaler and popularized in Thaler's 2008 book Nudge, co-authored with legal scholar Cass R. Sunstein. The book argues that small cues can help people make better choices.

Notable customers include Fidelity Investments, Silicon Valley Bank, Lumen, Farfetch, and American fast casual restaurant chain Sweetgreen.

A 2019 trademark dispute between Humu and American video streaming service Hulu was settled in federal court.

On June 24, 2021, Humu announced Humu Business Edition, a personal coach for mid-sized businesses.

In August 2023, Humu was acquired by Perceptyx.

== Funding ==
In May 2019, Humu announced it had raised $40 million in series A and B funding led by Index Ventures and IVP.

== See also ==
- Captology
