= Bertram Raven =

American psychologist and academic (1926–2020)

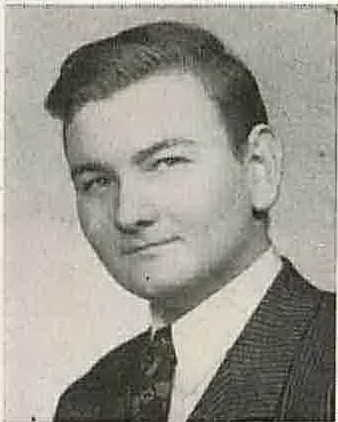
- Raven in 1945
- Born: Bertram Herbert Raven; September 26, 1926; Youngstown, Ohio, US
- Died: February 26, 2020 (aged 93)
- Spouse: Celia Raven (m. 1961)

Academic background
- Education: Ohio State University; University of Michigan
- Thesis: The Effect of Group Pressures on Opinion, Perception, and Communication (1953)
- Doctoral advisor: Leon Festinger

Academic work
- Discipline: Psychology
- Sub-discipline: Social psychology
- Institutions: University of California, Los Angeles
- Notable ideas: Five bases of power

Bertram Herbert Raven (September 26, 1926 – February 26, 2020) was an American academic. He was a member of the faculty of the psychology department at UCLA from 1956 until his death. He is perhaps best known for his early work in collaboration with John R. P. French, with whom he developed an analysis of the five bases of social power.

== Life and career ==
Born in Youngstown, Ohio, he received his BA and MA (1948, 1949) in psychology from Ohio State University and his PhD (1953) in social psychology from the University of Michigan. At UCLA, he was also director of the Survey Research Center, director of a training program in health psychology, and chair of the Department of Psychology. He served as a visiting professor and lecturer at the University of Nijmegen, Netherlands; Hebrew University of Jerusalem; London School of Economics; University of Washington; and University of Hawaii; as well as external examiner for the University of the West Indies.

His interests centered particularly on interpersonal influence and social power relationships which developed out of his original work on social power. That early work expanded to a broader reaching Power/Interaction Model of Interpersonal Influence. The model and theory has been applied to organizational power relationships, health psychology (e.g., compliance in health care), close relationships, educational settings. Historical and political analyses have applied the model to power confrontations between political figures and religion as a mechanism of social control. A Power/Interaction Inventory has been developed which will allow for cross-cultural comparisons. Such research is facilitated with an internet system which involves collaborating researchers in 14 different nations.

For his contributions, Raven received such awards and recognition as Fulbright Scholar, NATO Fellow, Guggenheim Fellow, NIMH Fellow, Kurt Lewin Awardee (for relating social psychological research and social action), and a Los Angeles City Council Citation (for developing the UCLA Upward Bound Project).

Raven was married to an Englishwoman, Celia Raven, from 1961 until his death. They had two children, Michelle and Jonathan.

== Bibliography ==
- Raven, B. H.; Rubin, J. Z. (1983). Social Psychology. Wiley. ISBN 0-471-87304-7
