= John R. P. French =

American psychologist

- Born: John Robert Putnam French Jr. August 7, 1913; Boston, Massachusetts, US
- Died: October 14, 1995 (aged 82); Ann Arbor, Michigan, US
- Spouse: Sophia L. Hunt (m. 1937)

Academic background
- Education: Antioch College; Black Mountain College; Harvard University
- Thesis: Behavior in Organized and Unorganized Groups Under Conditions of Frustration and Fear (1940)
- Influences: Kurt Lewin

Academic work
- Discipline: Psychology
- Sub-discipline: Social psychology
- Institutions: University of Michigan
- Notable ideas: Five bases of power

John Robert Putnam French Jr. (August 7, 1913 – October 14, 1995) was an American psychologist who served as professor emeritus at the University of Michigan. He may be best known for his collaboration with Bertram Raven on French and Raven's five bases of power in 1959.

== Life and career ==
John (Jack) French was born in Boston and graduated from Antioch College, Ohio, and Black Mountain College, North Carolina. In 1940 French received his doctorate from Harvard University, completing a dissertation on the cohesion of groups under distress. He became noted as an expert in social psychology and experimental research, especially in the application of Kurt Lewin's field theory to organizational and industrial settings.

French published widely. He served as a program director at the Research Center for Group Dynamics in 1947, and as president of the Society of Psychological Study of Social Issues. He received the National Institute for Mental Health's Research Career Award and was the recipient of a Fulbright Fellowship.

French is credited with naming the Hawthorne effect in 1953 after a 1924–1932 study conducted by Elton Mayo at the Hawthorne Works, a factory in Cicero, Illinois.

In 1937 French married Sophia L. Hunt and the couple had two children, Rebecca Kennedy and John R. P. French III. He died at Glacier Hills Nursing Center at the age of 82.
