= French and Raven's bases of power =

Study and taxonomy of types of power

In a notable study of power conducted by social psychologists John R. P. French and Bertram Raven in 1959, power is divided into five separate and distinct forms. They identified those five bases of power as coercive, reward, legitimate, referent, and expert. This was followed by Raven's subsequent addition in 1965 of a sixth separate and distinct base of power: informational power.

French and Raven defined social influence as "a change in the belief, attitude, or behavior of a person (the target of influence) which results from the action of another person (an influencing agent)", and they defined social power as the potential for such influence, that is, the ability of the agent to bring about such a change using available resources. The base of power theory is widely used to identify the appropriate type of power that can achieve behaviour change or outcomes from the target of influence.

Relating to social communication studies, power in social influence settings has introduced a large realm of research pertaining to persuasion tactics and leadership practices. Through social communication studies, it has been theorized that leadership and power are closely linked. It has been further presumed that different forms of power affect one's leadership and success. This idea is used often in organizational communication and throughout the workforce.

Though there have been many formal definitions of leadership that did not include social influence and power, any discussion of leadership must inevitably deal with the means by which a leader gets the members of a group or organization to act and move in a particular direction.

Whereby, this is to be considered "power" in social influential situations.

== Overview ==
The original French and Raven (1959) model included five bases of power – reward, coercion, legitimate, expert, and referent – however, informational power was added by Raven in 1965, bringing the total to six. Since then, the model has gone through very significant developments: coercion and reward can have personal as well as impersonal forms. Expert and referent power can be negative or positive. Legitimate power, in addition to position power, may be based on other normative obligations: reciprocity, equity, and responsibility. Information may be utilized in direct or indirect fashion.

French and Raven defined social power as the potential for influence (a change in the belief, attitude or behavior of a someone who is the target of influence.

As we know leadership and power are closely linked. This model shows how the different forms of power affect one's leadership and success. This idea is used often in organizational communication and throughout the workforce. "The French-Raven power forms are introduced with consideration of the level of observability and the extent to which power is dependent or independent of structural conditions. Dependency refers to the degree of internalization that occurs among persons subject to social control. Using these considerations it is possible to link personal processes to structural conditions".

== Original typology ==
The bases of social power have evolved over the years with benefits coming from advanced research and theoretical developments in related fields. On the basis of research and evidence, there have been many other developments and elaborations on the original theory. French and Raven developed an original model outlining the change dependencies and also further delineating each power basis.

=== Table 1 ===
Basis of Power	Social Dependence of Change	Importance of Surveillance
Coercion	Socially Dependent	Important
Reward	Socially Dependent	Important
Legitimacy	Socially Dependent	Unimportant
Expert	Socially Dependent	Unimportant
Referent	Socially Dependent	Unimportant
Informational	Socially Independent	Unimportant

It is a common understanding that most social influence can still be understood by the original six bases of power, but the foundational bases have been elaborated and further differentiated. Table 2 further differentiates the Bases of Social Power.

=== Table 2 ===
Basis of Power	Further Differentiation
Coercion	Impersonal Coercion and Personal Coercion
Reward	Impersonal Reward and Personal Reward
Legitimacy	Formal Legitimacy (position power), Legitimacy of Reciprocity, Equity and Dependence (Powerlessness)
Expert	Positive and Negative Expert
Referent	Positive and Negative Referent
Informational	Direct and Indirect Information

== Bases of power ==
As mentioned above, there are now six main concepts of power strategies consistently studied in social communication research. They are described as Coercive, Reward, Legitimate, Referent, Expert, and Informational. Additionally, research has shown that source credibility has an explicit effect on the bases of power used in persuasion.

Source credibility, the bases of power, and objective power, which is established based on variables such as position or title, are interrelated. The levels of each have a direct relationship in the manipulation and levels of one another.

The bases of power differ according to the manner in which social changes are implemented, the permanence of such changes, and the ways in which each basis of power is established and maintained.

The effectiveness of power is situational. Given there are six bases of power studied in the communication field, it is very important to know the situational uses of each power, focusing on when each is most effective. According to French and Raven, "it is of particular practical interest to know what bases of power or which power strategies are most likely to be effective, but it is clear that there is no simple answer.

For example, a power strategy that works immediately but relies on surveillance (for example, reward power or coercive power) may not last once surveillance ends. One organizational study found that reward power tended to lead to greater satisfaction on the part of employees, which means that it might increase influence in a broad range of situations. Coercive power was more effective in influencing a subordinate who jeopardized the success of the overall organization or threatened the leader's authority, even though in the short term it also led to resentment on the part of the target. A power strategy that ultimately leads to private acceptance and long-lasting change (for example, information power) may be difficult to implement, and consume considerable time and energy. In the short term, complete reliance on information power might even be dangerous (for example, telling a small child not to run into the street unattended). A military officer leading his troops into combat might be severely handicapped if he had to give complete explanations for each move. Instead, he would want to rely on unquestioned legitimate position power, backed up by coercive power. Power resources, which may be effective for one leader, dealing with one target or follower, may not work for a different leader and follower. The manner in which the power strategy is utilized will also affect its success or failure. Where coercion is deemed necessary, a leader might soften its negative effects with a touch of humor. There have been studies indicating that cultural factors may determine the effectiveness of power strategies."

=== Coercive power ===
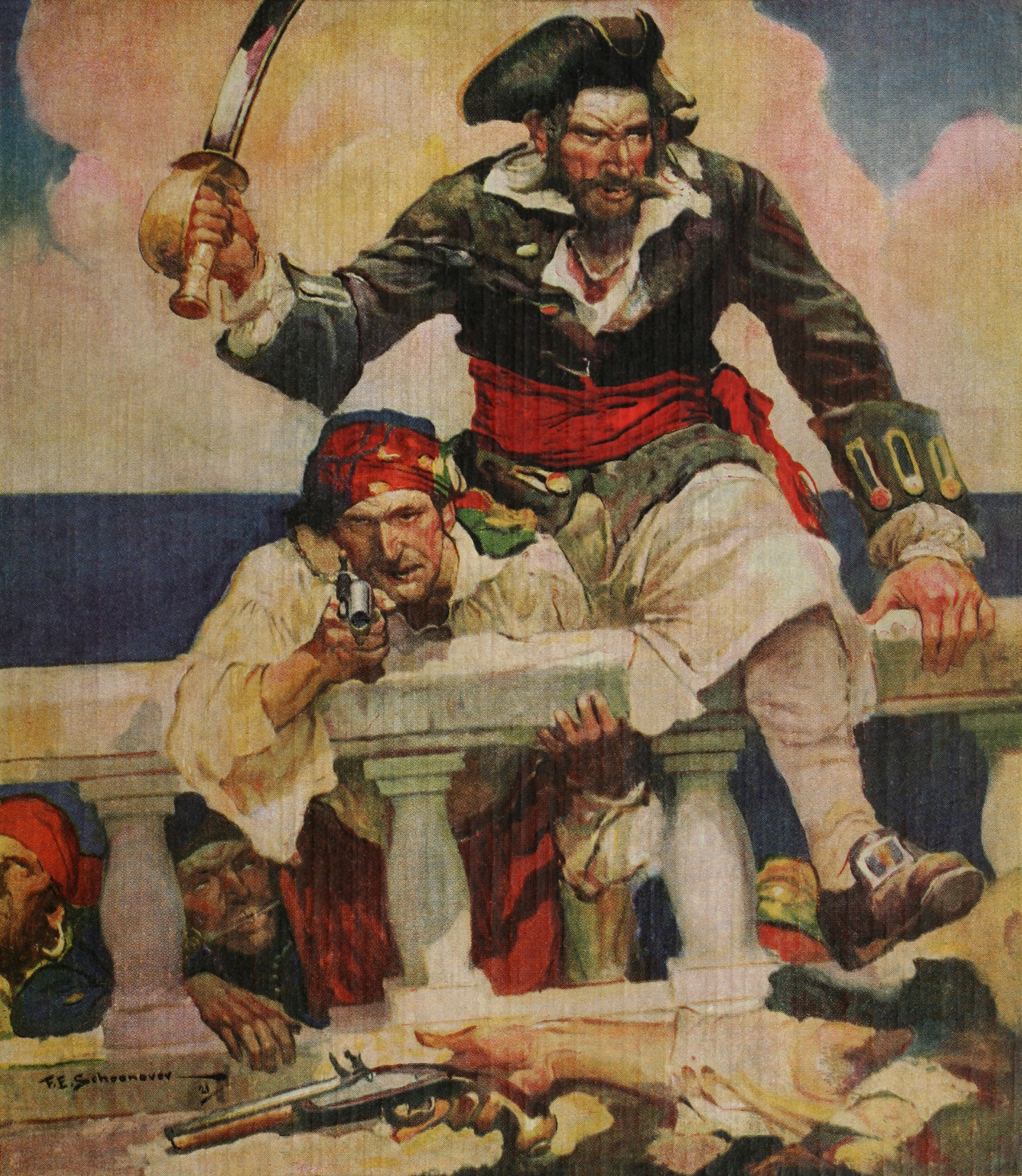
Blackbeard, the infamous pirate

Coercive power uses the threat of force to gain compliance from another. Force may include physical, social, emotional, political, or economic means. Coercion is not always recognized by the target of influence. This type of power is based upon the idea of coercion. The main idea behind this concept is that someone is forced to do something that he/she does not desire to do. The main goal of coercion is compliance. Coercive power's influence is socially dependent on how the target relates to the change being desired by the influence agent. Furthermore, a person would have to be consistently watched by the influencing agent in order for the change to remain in effect.

==== Impersonal ====
An example of impersonal coercion relates a person's belief that the influencing agent has the real power to physically threaten, impose a monetary fine or dismiss an employee.

==== Personal ====
An example of personal coercion relates to a threat of rejection or the possibility of disapproval from a person whom is highly valued.

According to Changingminds.org "demonstrations of the harm are often used to illustrate what will happen if compliance is not gained". The power of coercion has been proven to be related with punitive behavior that may be outside one's normal role expectations. However coercion has also been associated positively with generally punitive behavior and negatively associated to contingent reward behavior. This source of power can often lead to problems and in many circumstances it involves abuse. These types of leaders rely on the use of threats in their leadership style. Often the threats involve saying someone will be fired or demoted.

=== Reward power ===
Reward power is based on the right of some to offer or deny tangible, social, emotional, or spiritual rewards to others for doing what is wanted or expected of them. Some examples of reward power (positive reward) are: (a) a child is given a dollar for earning better grades; (b) a student is admitted into an honor society for excellent effort; (c) a retiree is praised and feted for lengthy service at a retirement party; and (d) New York firefighters were heralded as heroes for their acts on September 11, 2001.

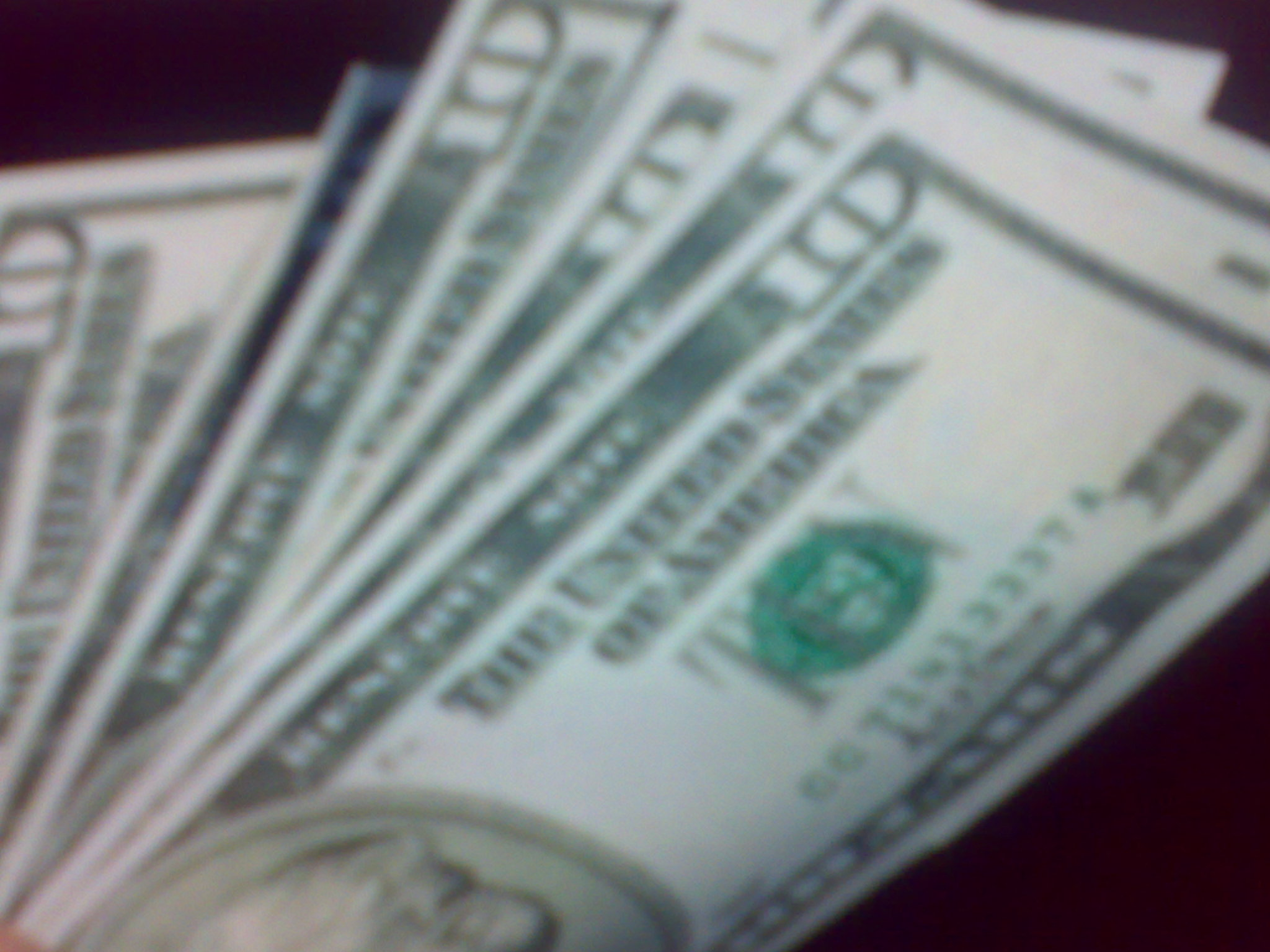
Money is one of the most commonly used rewards.

Some examples of reward power (negative reward) are: (a) a driver is fined for illegal parking; (b) a teenager grounded for a week for misbehaving; (c) a rookie player is ridiculed for not following tradition; and (d) President Warren G. Harding's name is commonly invoked whenever political scandal is mentioned. Some pitfalls can emerge when a too heavy reliance is placed on reward power; these include: (a) some people become fixated and too dependent on rewards to do even mundane activities; (b) too severe fears of punishment can immobilize some people; (c) as time passes, past rewards become insufficient to motivate or activate desired outcomes; and (d) negative rewards may be perverted into positive attention.

==== Impersonal ====
An example of impersonal reward relates to promises of promotions, money and rewards from various social areas.

==== Personal ====
An example of personal reward relates to the reward of receiving approval from a desired person and building relationships with romantic partners.

=== Legitimate power ===
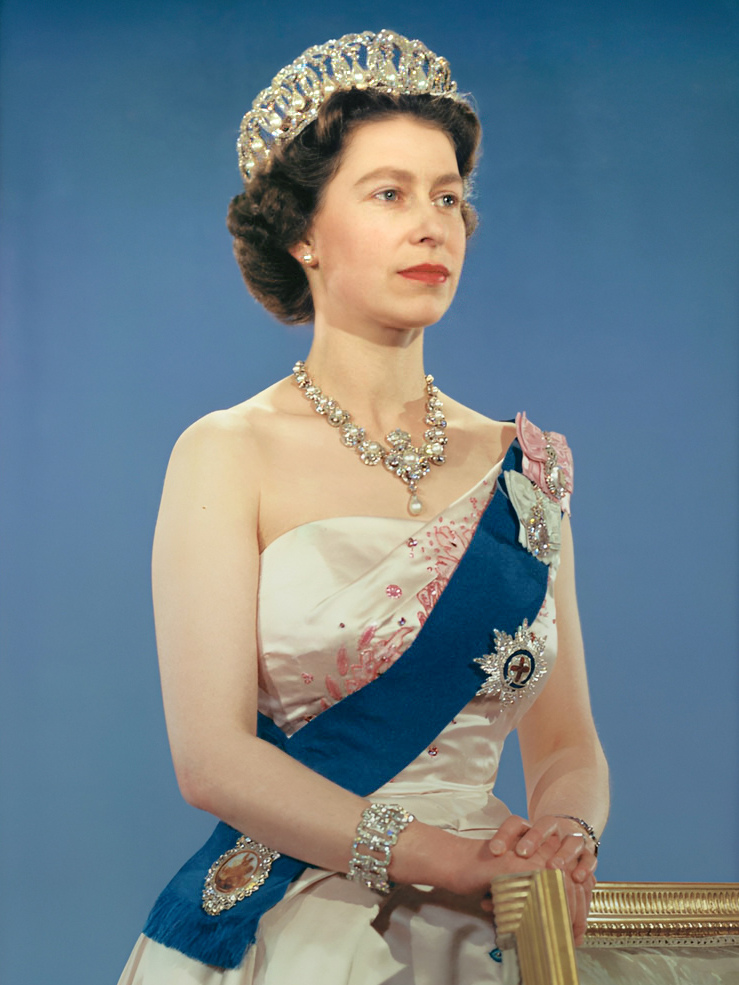
Queen Elizabeth II

Legitimate power comes from an elected, selected, or appointed position of authority and may be underpinned by social norms. This power which means the ability to administer to another certain feelings of obligation or the notion of responsibility. "Rewarding and Punishing subordinates is generally seen as a legitimate part of the formal or appointed leadership role and most managerial positions in work organizations carry with them, some degree of expected reward and punishment." This type of formal power relies on position in an authority hierarchy. Occasionally, those possessing legitimate power fail to recognize they have it, and may begin to notice others going around them to accomplish their goals. Three bases of legitimate power are cultural values, acceptance of social structure, and designation. Cultural values comprise a general basis for legitimate power of one entity over another. Such legitimacy is conferred by others and this legitimacy can be revoked by the original granters, their designees, or their inheritors.

Legitimate power originates from a target of influence accepting the power of the influencing agent whereas behavioral change or compliance occurs based on target's obligation. One who uses legitimate power may have a high need for power which is their motivator to use this base for change in behavior and influence. There may be a range of legitimate power.

==== Position ====
The legitimate position power is based on the social norm which requires people to be obedient to those who hold superior positions in a formal or informal social structure. Examples may include: a police officer's legitimacy to make arrests; a parent's legitimacy to restrict a child's activities; the President's legitimacy to live in the White House; and the Congress' legitimacy to declare war. Some pitfalls can arise when too heavy reliance is placed on legitimate power; these include: (a) unexpected exigencies call for non-legitimized individuals to act in the absence of a legitimate authority – such as a citizen's arrest in the absence of a police official; and (b) military legitimacy

==== Reciprocity ====
The legitimate power of reciprocity is based on the social norm of reciprocity. Which states how we feel obligated to do something in return for someone who does something beneficial for us.

==== Equity ====
The legitimate power of equity is based on the social norm of equity (or compensatory damages) The social norm of equity makes people feel compelled to compensate someone who has suffered or worked hard. As well as someone whom we have harmed in some way is based on the premise that there is a wrong that can be made right, which may be a compensatory form of righting the wrong.

==== Dependence ====
The legitimate power of dependence is based on the social norm of social responsibility. Social responsibility norm states how people feel obligated to help someone who is in need of assistance.

People traditionally obey the person with this power solely based on their role, position or title rather than the person specifically as a leader. Therefore, this type of power can easily be lost and the leader does not have his position or title anymore. This power is therefore not strong enough to be one's only form of influencing/persuading.

=== Referent power ===
Referent power is rooted in the affiliations we make and/or the groups and organizations we belong to. Our affiliation with a group and the beliefs of the group are shared to some degree. As Referent power emphasizes similarity, respect for an agent of influence's superiority may be undermined by a target of influence. Use of this power base and its outcomes may be negative or positive. An agent for change motivated with a strong need for affiliation and concern of likeability will prefer this power base and will influence their leadership style. Ingratiation or flattery and sense of community may be used by an agent of influence to enhance their influence.

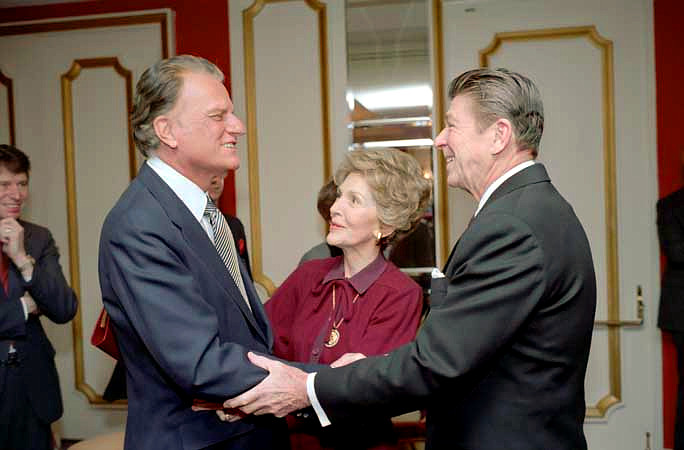
President Ronald Reagan and First Lady Nancy Reagan with Billy Graham

==== Positive ====
Referent power in a positive form utilizes the shared personal connection or shared belief between the influencing agent and target with the intention of positively correlated actions of the target.

==== Negative ====
Referent power in a negative form produces actions in opposition to the intent of the influencing agent, this is the result from the agent's creation of cognitive dissonance between the referent influencing agent and the target's perception of that influence.

Examples of referent power include: (a) each of the last seven White House press secretaries have been paid handsomely for their memoirs relating to their presence at the seat of government; (b) Mrs. Hillary Clinton gained political capital by her marriage to the President; (c) Reverend Pat Robertson lost a bid for the Republican Party's nomination for president due, in significant part, to his religious affiliation; and (4) national firefighters have received vocational acclaim due to the association with the heroic NYC firefighters. Some pitfalls can occur related to referent assumptions; these include: (a) guilt or glory by association where little or no true tie is established; (b) associative traits tend to linger long after real association ends; (c) some individuals tend to pay dearly for associates' misdeeds or terrible reputations. It is important to distinguish between referent power and other bases of social power involving control or conformity. According to Fuqua, Payne, and Cangemi, referent power acts a little like role model power. It depends on respecting, liking, and holding another individual in high esteem. It usually develops over a long period of time.

The power of holding the ability to administer to another a sense of personal acceptance or personal approval. This type of power is strong enough that the power-holder is often looked up to as a role model. This power is often regarded as admiration, or charm. The responsibility involved is heavy and the power easily lost, but when combined with other forms of power it can be very useful. Referent power is commonly seen in political and military figures, although celebrities often have this as well.

=== Expert power ===
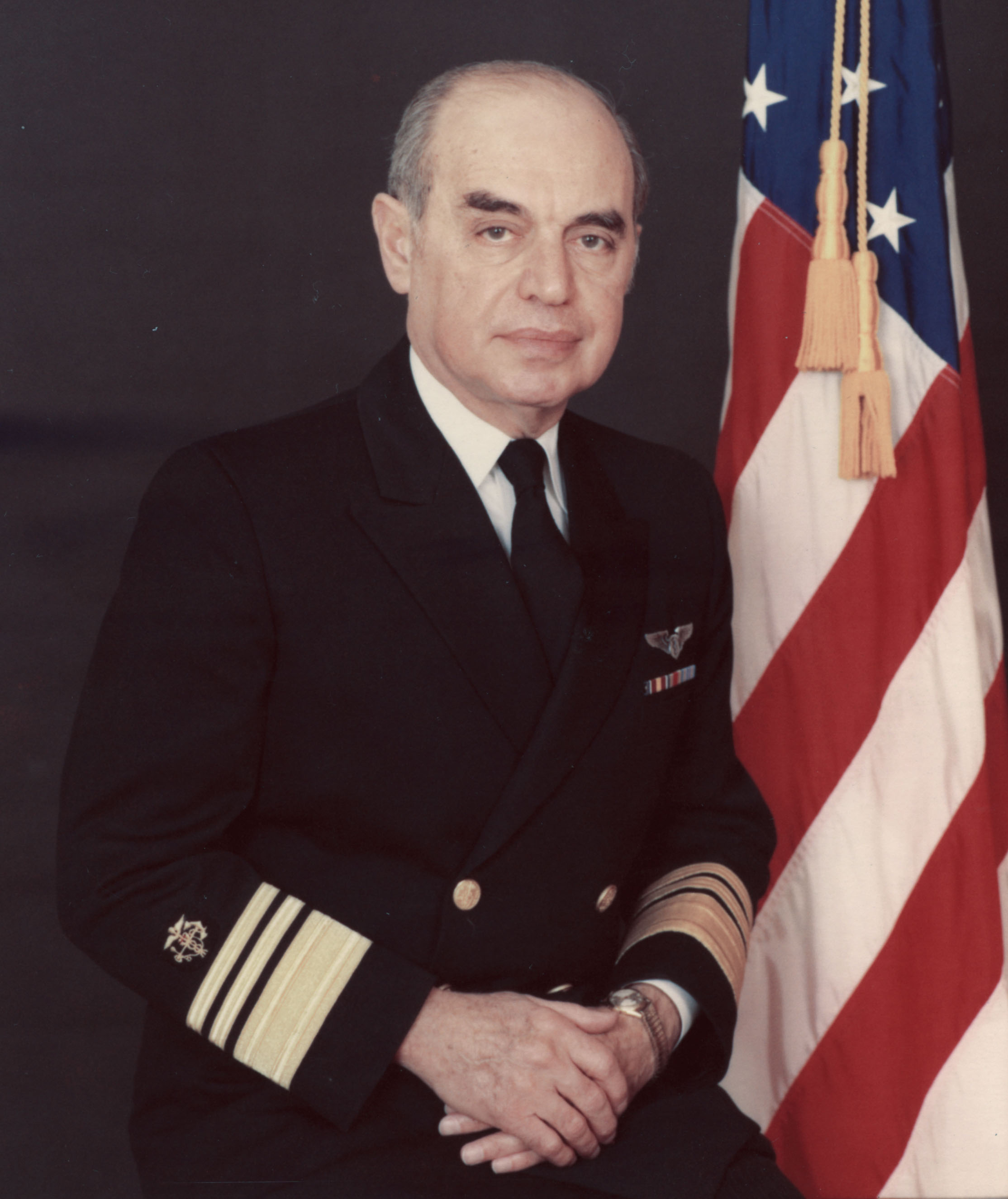
Julius Richmond, Surgeon General of the United States

Expert power is based on what one knows, experience, and special skills or talents. Expertise can be demonstrated by reputation, credentials certifying expertise, and actions. The effectiveness and impacts of the Expert power base may be negative or positive. According to Raven, there will be more use of Expert power if the motive is a need for achievement. The ability to administer to another information, knowledge or expertise. (Example: Doctors, lawyers). As a consequence of the expert power or knowledge, a leader is able to convince their subordinates to trust them. The expertise does not have to be genuine – it is the perception of expertise that provides the power base. When individuals perceive or assume that a person possesses superior skills or abilities, they award power to that person.

==== Positive ====
Expert power in a positive form influences the target to act accordingly as instructed by the expert, based on the assumption of the expert's correct knowledge.

==== Negative ====
Expert power in a negative form can result from a person acting in opposition to the expert's instructions if the target feels that the expert has personal gain motives.

Some examples include: (a) a violinist demonstrating through audition skill with music; (b) a professor submits school transcripts to demonstrate discipline expertise; (c) a bricklayer relies on 20+ years of experience to prove expertise. Some pitfalls can emerge when too heavy a reliance is made on expertise; these include: (a) sometimes inferences are made suggesting expertise is wider in scope than it actually is; for example, an expert in antique vases may have little expertise in antique lamps; (b) one's expertise is not everlasting; for example, a physician who fails to keep up with medical technology and advances may lose expertise; and (c) expertise does not necessarily carry with it common sense or ethical judgement.

=== Informational power ===
French and Raven's original five powers brought about change after many years, by which Raven added a sixth base of power. Informational is the ability of an agent of influence to bring about change through the resource of information. Raven arguably believed that power as a potential influence logically meant that information was a form of influence and the social power base of Information Power was derived. Informational influence results in cognition and acceptance by the target of influence. The ability for altered behavior initiated through information rather than a specific change agent is called socially independent change. In order to establish Information Power, an agent of influence would likely provide a baseline of information to a target of influence to lay the groundwork in order to be effective with future persuasion. A link between informational power, control, cooperation, and satisfaction have been hypothesized and tested in a lab study. The findings indicate that a channel member's control over another's strategy increases with its informational power source. According to Raven, there will be more use of Information power if the motive is a need for achievement and can also be affected by an agent's self-esteem. Feldman summarizes informational power as the most transitory type of power. If one gives information away, then the power is given away, which differs from other forms of power because it's grounded in what you know about the content of a specific situation. Other forms of power are independent of the content.

Information power comes as a result of possessing knowledge that others need or want. In the age of Information technology, information power is increasingly relevant as an abundance of information is readily available. There may be a cost-benefit analysis by an agent of influence to determine if Information Power or influence is the best strategy. Informational influence or persuasion would generally be favorable however it may not be best suited if timing and effort lacks. Information possessed that no one needs or wants is powerless. Information power extends to the ability to get information not presently held such as a case with a librarian or data base manager. Not all information is readily available; some information is closely controlled by few people. Examples of information that is sensitive or limits accessibility: (a) national security data; (b) personnel information for government or business; (c) corporate trade secrets; (d) juvenile court records; (e) many privately settled lawsuit documents; (f) Swiss bank account owners; and (g) private phone conversations. Of course, legally obtained phone tap warrants, spying, eavesdropping, group and group member leaks can allow others not intended to be privy to information. Possessing information is not, typically, the vital act; it is what one can and does do or potentially can do with the information that typically is of vital importance. Information can, and often is, used as a weapon as in a divorce, a child custody case, business dissolution, or in civil suits discoveries. Information has been used by some to extort action, utterance, agreement, or settlement by others.

Information power is a form of personal or collective power that is based on controlling information needed by others in order to reach an important goal. Our society is now reliant on information power as knowledge for influence, decision making, credibility, and control. Timely and relevant information delivered on demand can be the most influential way to acquire power. Information may be readily available through public records, research, however, information is sometimes assumed privileged or confidential. The target of influence accepts, comprehends and internalizes the change independently, without having to go back to the influencing agent.<

Informational power is based on the potential to utilize information. Providing rational arguments, using information to persuade others, using facts and manipulating information can create a power base. How information is used – sharing it with others, limiting it to key people, keeping it secret from key people, organizing it, increasing it, or even falsifying it – can create a shift in power within a group.

==== Direct ====
Information presented by the influencing agent directly to the target of change.

==== Indirect ====
Information presented influencing agent indirectly to the target of change void of attempting influence, such as hints or suggestions.

==== Socially independent of change ====
The ability for altered behavior initiated through information rather than a specific change agent is called socially independent change. Power socially independent of change may reflect the target continuing changed behavior without referring to, or even remembering, the supervisor or individual of authority as an agent of change because the target understands and accepts the reasoning of information received.

==== Accessibility ====
Raven acknowledged leaders can attempt to influence subordinates by access and control of information. Information power may be used in both personal and positional classifications and is among the most preferable power bases.

==== Tools/mechanisms ====
Informational power includes not only possessing information, but also the ability to obtain relevant information in a timely way to amass a power base. The use of tools or technological mechanisms such as internet, smart phones, and Social media progresses society's access to information but informational power as a base is derived by determining the usefulness and appropriateness of the information.

== Power as a function of leadership and leadership styles ==
Tradition power is that force that is exerted upon us to conform to traditional ways. Traditions, for the most part, are social constructs; they invite, seduce, or compel us to conform and act in predictable, patterned ways. Breaking with traditions put people at risk of social alienation. Traditions can blunt rationality; they can block innovation; and they can appear to outsiders as silly when original traditions' rationales become outdated or forgotten.

The power of traditions, rather than being typically vested in particular individuals, is ordinarily focused on group conformity

Charismatic power is that aura possessed by only a few individuals in our midst; it is characterized by super confidence, typical physical attractiveness, social adroitness, amiability, sharpened leadership skills, and heightened charm. Some charisma has dark and sinister overtones such as that shown by Adolf Hitler, Jim Jones, Idi Amin, Osama bin Laden, David Koresh, and many confidence tricksters. Others demonstrate more positive displays of charisma such as that displayed by Jacqueline Kennedy, Charles de Gaulle, Diana, Princess of Wales, Michael Jordan, and Bruce Springsteen. Charisma has, in many cases, short circuited rationality; that is, others have been fooled into or lulled into not rationally considering what a charismatic requests or demands but going along as a result of the charismatic attraction. It must be remembered that power is effective only when the target of powerful actions agrees [implicitly or explicitly] to the relevant power dynamic; we are all technically able to resist the power of others; at times, however, we may feel powerless to resist or the social, political, personal, and/or emotional price to be paid is too high or we fear failure in resisting.

== Power Tactics ==
Regardless of the basis of power in use, power-holders often use power tactics to influence others. Power tactics are different strategies used to influence others, typically to gain a particular advantage or objective. Power-holders commonly use six different power tactics.

- The first is soft tactics which utilize the relationships between the target and the influencer to bring out compliance. Sometimes individuals use this method of influence more indirectly and interpersonally through the use of friendships, socialization, collaboration, and personal rewards.
- The second tactic is hard tactics that rely on economic, tangible outcomes. These tactics are harsh, forcing, or direct, especially in comparison to soft tactics. Though this tactic may seem more significant, it is not necessarily more powerful than soft tactics.
- The third tactic is rational tactics; they use reasoning, logic, and sound judgement by bargaining and persuading the target they are influencing.
- The fourth tactic is nonrational; these tactics rely on emotionality and misinformation; an example would be ingratiation and evasion.
- The fifth power tactic is bilateral tactics; these are based on an interactive approach involving a give-and-take process for both the influencer and the target receiving the influence. For instance, someone using bilateral tactics would likely open discussions with the person they are trying to influence and be more prone to negotiating with the target.
- The last power tactic is unilateral tactics; these are the opposite of an interactive approach and instead can be done without the cooperation of the target, including making demands, disengagement, and evasion.

People will vary in their use of power tactics and use a mixture of the six. For instance, when asked, “How would you get your way?” different powerholders will respond with a range of power tactics. An interpersonally oriented individual who wishes to be liked will use more soft, indirect, and rational power tactics in leader roles. In contrast, someone who holds dictatorial power will use hard, direct, and irrational tactics.

Personal and biological characteristics also influence the use of power tactics. For instance, an extrovert –an outgoing and overtly expressive individual – will use a more extensive range of tactics than an introvert – a shy or reticent individual. A difference in tactics also exists between males and females. Females tend to intervene more diminutively than their male counterparts in leadership roles and use far fewer tactics. A study conducted by Instone, Major, and Bunker (1983) found that women who supervised an inadequate employee would promise more irregular pay raises and threaten more pay deductions than men in the same position. In intimate relationships, women tend to lean toward using unilateral and indirect methods with their partners, whereas men use bilateral and direct tactics.

Situational factors can also play a role in the use of power tactics. Depending on the nature of the group situation, certain people will react differently in their leadership role; high-status members tend to use more conflict-driven tactics than low-status members, who aim to minimize any conflict. Different situations call for different tactics: a teacher will lean toward using soft tactics on their students, whereas a CEO may switch back and forth between soft and hard tactics depending on the situation. People may often vary in their power tactics and can use a range of tactics depending on the situation; power tactics are case-specific.
