= Laszlo Bock =

American businessman (born 1972)

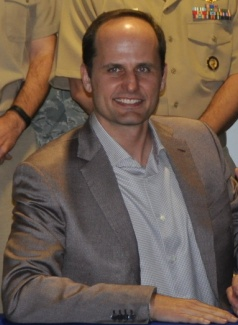
- Laszlo Bock in 2014
- Born: 1972 (age 53–54); Romania
- Education: Pomona College (BA); Yale University (MBA)
- Known for: Former Senior Vice President of People Operations at Google
- Notable work: Work Rules!: Insights from Inside Google That Will Transform How You Live and Lead

Laszlo Bock (born 1972) is a Romanian-born Hungarian American businessman, who is co-founder and former CEO of Humu. He was formerly the Senior Vice President of People Operations at Google, Inc.

== Early life and career ==
He was born in 1972 in Romania to ethnic Hungarian parents.

Prior to joining Google, Bock served in executive roles at General Electric, as a management consultant at McKinsey & Company, and in various roles at startups, nonprofits, and in acting. During his time at Google, the company has been named the Best Company to Work for over 30 times around the world and received over 100 awards as a top employer. In 2010, Bock was named "Human Resources Executive of the Year" by HR Resources Magazine. He resigned his position at Google in 2016, though stayed on as an adviser to CEO Sundar Pichai.

On April 7, 2015, Bock published his first book, The New York Times bestseller and Wall Street Journal bestseller, Work Rules!, a practical guide to help people find meaning in work and improve the way they live and lead. He has been on several book tours around the world, often accompanied by his family. In addition to his own published works, Bock also wrote the foreword to Knaflic, Cole Nussbaumer (2 November 2015). Storytelling with Data: A Data Visualization Guide for Business Professionals. John Wiley & Sons. ISBN 9781119002253.

== Humu Inc ==
Laszlo Bock along with two former Google executives Wayne Crosby and Jessie Wisdom founded Humu, a startup devoted to making work more beneficial for people in different industries. Their main objective of the company is to employ Behavioral Change Technology in ensuring that employees are happier in their jobs. The technology has become popular because it establishes a viable technique to increase adoption of positive modifications in behavior. The company's strategies are anchored on novel innovations in machine erudition and many years of conducting scientific research on human behavior. Current customers include Silicon Valley Bank, Farfetch, Ecolab, and American fast casual restaurant chain Sweetgreen.

Humu's mission statement is “Making work better everywhere through machine learning, science, and a little bit of love”. This is confirmed in the company's public materials and website. The company also built the Nudge Engine, a tool that identifies what changes need to happen where, and delivers tiny, scientifically based interventions called nudges.

Business Insider was able to interview Bock and Crosby regarding the hiring process at Humu. The co-founders pointed out one quality that makes a certain candidate more prominent and that is the capability to convey his or her own story. This trait is just as essential as technical proficiency. Applicants get the chance to present their personal history and experiences to the interviewer.

In August 2023, Humu was acquired by Perceptyx.
