= B. J. Fogg =

American social scientist (born 1963)

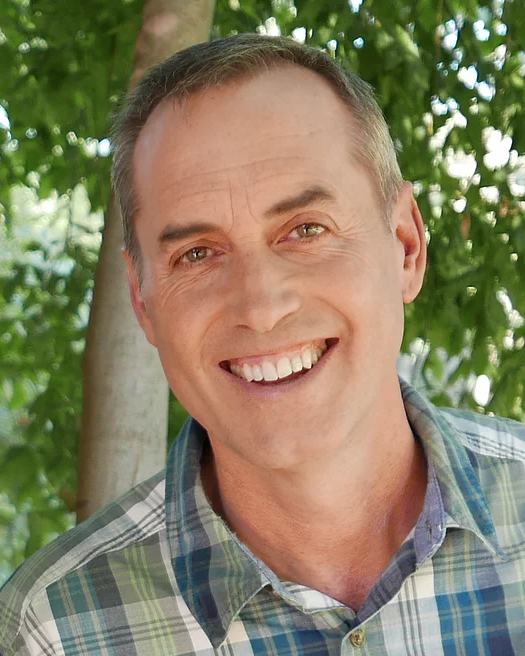
- Fogg in 2017
- Born: Brian Jeffrey Fogg; August 7, 1963 (age 63); Dallas, Texas, U.S.
- Education: Brigham Young University (BA, MA); Stanford University (MA, PhD)
- Known for: Fogg behavior model; Persuasive technology; Behavioural design
- Scientific career
- Fields: Captology
- Workplaces: Stanford University
- Thesis: Charismatic computers (1997)
- Website: www.bjfogg.com

Brian Jeffrey Fogg (born August 7, 1963) is an American social scientist and author who is a research associate and adjunct professor at Stanford University. He is the founder and director of the Stanford Behavior Design Lab, formerly known as the Persuasive Technology Lab.

== Education ==
Fogg was born in 1963 in Dallas. He later grew up in Fresno, California, where he was raised in a Mormon family with six siblings. At the age of eighteen, Fogg went to Peru for a two-year mission. Fogg has a Bachelor of Arts and Master of Arts in English from Brigham Young University. He earned a second Masters and a PhD in Communications from Stanford, where he served as a teaching assistant to Philip Zimbardo.

== Career ==
In 1986, Fogg was one of the founders of the Student Review, an independent student newspaper at Brigham Young University, and in 1992-1993 taught English and design at BYU. While at BYU, Fogg published eight short stories and poems in Dialogue: A Journal of Mormon Thought; Sunstone, "a quarterly journal of Mormon experience, scholarship, issues, and art"; and other Mormon-affiliated publications. His Masters thesis, "Terms of Address Among Latter-Day Saints" and "Names Mormons Use for Jesus: Contexts and Trends" were both published by the Deseret Language and Linguistics Society Symposium in February 1990 and March 1991, respectively.

In 1998, Fogg published a peer-reviewed paper, Persuasive Computers: Perspectives and Research Directions, which included a section that "proposes ethical responsibilities for designers of persuasive computers and captology researchers, and discusses the importance of educating about persuasion."

In 1999, he was the guest editor for an issue of ACM focusing on persuasive technologies.

In 2003, Fogg published the book, Persuasive Technology: Using Computers to Change What We Think and Do. This book provided a foundation for captology, the study of computers as persuasive technologies. In it, he discusses the implications of macrosuasion and microsuasion—terms he uses to define and describe the persuasive intent of a product, providing examples across the web, in video games, and other software products.

In 2006, Fogg and some of his students created a video for consideration by the FTC about persuasive technology.

In 2007, Fogg co-taught a Stanford course about Facebook Apps with Dave McClure, where students used persuasive design to create Facebook apps that amassed millions of users during the 10-week course. The New York Times quoted Fogg as referring to it as "a period of time when you could walk in and collect gold."

In 2009, Fogg's interests gradually shifted from persuasive technology to general human behavior. He published the Fogg Behavior Model (FBM), a model for analyzing and designing human behavior. The FBM describes three conditions needed for a behavior to occur: (1) motivation (2) ability and (3) a prompt. Motivation can be influenced by factors like pleasure/pain, hope/fear, and social acceptance/rejection. Ability can be impacted by time, money, physical effort, brain cycles, social deviance, and non-routine. Prompts are also referred to as triggers.

In December 2011, Fogg developed a method to develop habits from baby steps, which he calls "Tiny Habits". He gave two TEDx talks on this and related topics.

He was the founder and director of Stanford's Mobile Health conference (2008–2012).

In 2020, Fogg published the book Tiny Habits: The Small Changes That Change Everything, which describes in detail the "Tiny Habits" method of starting small when building sustainable habits to support a happier and healthier life. This book was on The New York Times Best Sellers List—under Advice, How-To & Miscellaneous—for three weeks.

== Personal life ==
Fogg lives in Healdsburg, California and Maui.

== Notable students ==
- Ramit Sethi, founder of GrowthLab.com and co-founder of PBworks
- Mike Krieger, co-founder of Instagram
- Tristan Harris, co-founder of the Center for Humane Technology

== Bibliography ==
- Persuasive Technology (2003)
- Mobile Persuasion (with Dean Eckles; 2008)
- Texting 4 Health (with Richard Adler; 2009)
- Facebook For Parents (with Linda Fogg Phillips; 2010)
- Tiny Habits (2020)
