= Web literacy =

Ability to read and write web content

Web literacy encompasses the skills and competencies needed for reading, writing, and participating on the World Wide Web. It has been described as "both content and activity" meaning that web users should not just learn about the web but also about how to make their own website.

== History ==
In the late 1990s, literacy researchers began to explore the differences between printed text and network-enabled devices with screens. This research was largely focused on two areas: the credibility of information that can be found on the World Wide Web and the difference that hypertext makes to reading and writing. These skills were included in definitions of information literacy and included in a SCONUL position paper in 1999. This paper became the '7 Pillars of Information Literacy', which was last updated in 2011.

== See also ==
- Cyber self-defense
- Computer literacy
- Digital literacy
- Information literacy
- Media literacy
