= Mycoskie =

Mycoskie is a surname. Notable people with the surname include:

- Blake Mycoskie (born 1976), American businessman
- Paige Mycoskie (born 1980), American artist, fashion designer, and businesswoman
