= Mantra Eyewear =

Chinese eyewear company

- Founded: 2012 in Beijing, China
- Founder: Sam Waldo; Andrew Shirman
- Products: Eyewear

Mantra Eyewear is an eyewear company that utilizes a "buy one, give one" business model, similar to Toms Shoes and Warby Parker. In partnership with Education in Sight, a non-profit organization which specializes in eye care for students, Mantra donates a pair of prescription eyeglasses to a child in need in Yunnan, China for every pair of sunglasses sold.

== History ==
The company was founded in 2012 in Beijing, China by Sam Waldo and Andrew Shirman. Waldo and Shirman first developed an interest in China while at university. Waldo started studying Mandarin at Columbia University, while Shirman studied the language at Boston College. Immediately after graduation from university in 2010 they participated in a volunteer teaching program called Teach For China. While working with the organization, they had discovered that there are over 30 million students in rural China who suffered from poor eyesight and lacked the resources to correct their vision. To combat this issue, Education in Sight was started by Shirman and Waldo with the help of some of their Teach for China fellows. To date, Education in Sight has partnered with over 300 schools, administered over 150,000 eye examinations, and has facilitated the donation of over 19,000 prescription glasses. By 2020, EIS aims to reach all the poor regions of Yunnan, donating 800,000 prescription glasses to students in need.

In order to attain this goal, Waldo and Shirman founded Mantra Eyewear in 2016 with the goal of engaging and involving the Chinese middle-class youth in social issues. It was initially conceived as a solution to solve their difficulties of finding funding to help support the eye care for their students in need. In April 2016, Mantra officially launched their first line of sunglasses.

== Business model ==
Mantra adopted the "buy one, give one" business model, made popular by Toms Shoes and Warby Parker. For each pair of sunglasses sold, Mantra uses the proceeds to fund the eye examination and the purchase of a pair of prescription glasses for a child in need. Each pair of glasses come packaged with a serial code that can be input using the Chinese-based super-app, WeChat, to track the donation all the way to the recipient school. In 2016, Mantra launched their website, www.findyourmantra.com.cn, as well as its English language counterpart, www.findyourmantra.com.
