= Suay Sew Shop =

Textile upcycling company in Los Angeles

Coordinates: 34°06′12.0″N 118°14′36.5″W

- Formation: 2017; 8 years ago
- Founder: Tina Dosewell; Lindsay Rose Medoff
- Headquarters: Downtown Los Angeles
- CEO: Lindsay Rose Medoff
- Website: https://suayla.com

Suay Sew Shop is a sustainable clothing and accessory manufacturing company based in the Arts District in Downtown Los Angeles. Through upcycling of textiles, Suay reclaims used garments and uses them to create new items.

== History ==
Suay Sew Shop was founded in late 2017 by Lindsay Rose Medoff (now the chief executive officer) along with Tina Dosewell. The two met in 2004 through the local sewing community. After working in the field of recycled and reworked clothing for over a decade, during which she also spent time as an organic farmer, Medoff opened Suay for the initial purpose of manufacturing Patagonia's "ReCrafted" line of apparel made from recycled Patagonia gear. The shop subsequently entered several other partnerships with corporations.

The name Suay means "beautiful" in Dosewell's native Thai language.

We are focused on helping individuals participate in a community-based cleanup economy.

— Suay CEO Lindsay Rose Medoff

The COVID-19 pandemic shifted the focus of Suay's activity. Setting corporate partnerships aside, the organization instead developed a high-filtration face mask made from shop towels, a design that was endorsed by Cleveland Clinic. By January 2021, the shop had donated over 220,000 of the masks to individuals in high-risk environments as well as schools, hospitals, and organizations including Refugee Health Alliance, Seeding Sovereignty, and Watts Community Core. Suay additionally began a food distribution program for garment workers and a textile upcycling program at the local level.

As of September 2022, Suay was planning a partnership with the National Day Laborer Organizing Network.

After seven years in Elysian Valley, Los Angeles, the shop relocated to the Arts District in Downtown Los Angeles in early 2024.

=== Food distribution ===
Through a program dubbed "Know Your Grower, Know Your Sewer", Suay has provided garment workers in the Los Angeles area who had been affected by the COVID-19 pandemic with fresh produce for themselves and their families. The program, a partnership with Frecker Farms and the Garment Worker Center, functions as a one for one process in which customers can donate a produce box by buying one for themselves, or can choose to only donate.

=== Textile upcycling and repair ===
Suay collects donations of old clothing and other fabric items from the local community. Repairable items are fixed and given away for free, while other pieces are upcycled into new items to be sold at an onsite retail store. Products include pants and shorts, beanies, and sweatshirts among other items. As of March 2021, the shop was taking in thousands of pounds of textiles per week for repair or upcycling. As of September 2022, Suay had diverted 381 short tons (346 metric tons) of clothing from landfills.

The shop additionally offers clothing repair services, fixing customers' damaged items with a turnaround time of three to seven days. Costs for repair range from $10 to $40, with proceeds going to a fund for LA garment workers. Tailoring, clothing customization, and quilting are also offered, and a dye bath open to the community for $12 to $16 per pound allows customers to re-dye their textiles in any of three colors Suay chooses each month.

== Structure ==
Suay exists to prove you can supply open air, bright light, a true living wage, security, safety and career advancement to your production team and still have a business.

— Lindsay Rose Medoff

Suay employs 30 sewers as of January 2021. These employees are paid above minimum wage and play a role in the decision-making process at the company for various matters including the hiring process. The company is planned to become worker-owned within the next few years, and intends to expand to other cities.

The central ethos of Suay is circular production, in which textiles are reused and upcycled for as long as possible

== Awards ==
Suay founder and CEO Lindsay Rose Medoff was named one of 11 "Women of the Year" for 2021 by Time Out for her work with the shop.
