= One for One =

One for One may refer to:

- One for One (Andrew Hill album), 1975
- One for One (Julian Austin album), 2009
- One for one, a social entrepreneurship business model
