= The Amazing Race 2 =

Season of television series

- Season 2
- Region 1 DVD cover
- Presented by: Phil Keoghan
- No. of teams: 11
- Winners: Chris Luca and Alex Boylan
- No. of legs: 13
- Distance traveled: 52,000 mi (84,000 km)
- No. of episodes: 11

Release
- Original network: CBS
- Original release: March 11 – May 15, 2002

Additional information
- Filming dates: January 7 – February 3, 2002

Series chronology
- ← Previous; Season 1 Next → Season 3

The Amazing Race 2 is the second season of the American reality competition show The Amazing Race. Hosted by Phil Keoghan, it featured eleven teams of two, each with a pre-existing relationship, competing in a race around the world. This season visited five continents and eight countries, traveling approximately 52,000 miles (84,000 km) over thirteen legs. Filming took place from January 7 to February 3, 2002. Starting in Pahrump, Nevada, racers traveled through Brazil, South Africa, Namibia, Thailand, Hong Kong, Australia, and New Zealand, before returning to the United States, traveling through Hawaii and Alaska, and finishing in the San Francisco Bay Area. The season premiered on CBS on March 11, 2002, and concluded on May 15, 2002.

Lifelong friends Chris Luca and Alex Boylan were the winners of this season, while estranged couple Tara Lynch and Wil Steger finished in second place, and siblings Blake and Paige Mycoskie finished in third place.

== Format ==
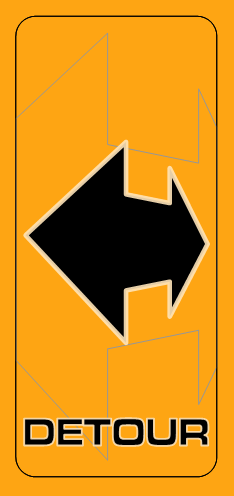
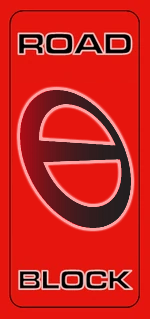
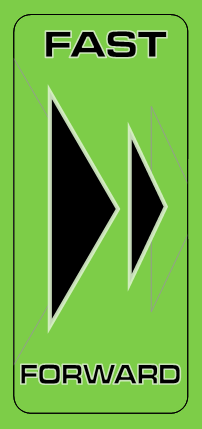
The clues which contestants receive during the course of the race generally fall into four categories: Route Info, Detour, Roadblock, and Fast Forward.

The Amazing Race is a reality television show created by Bertram van Munster and Elise Doganieri, and hosted by Phil Keoghan. The series follows teams of two competing in a race around the world. Each leg of the race requires teams to deduce clues, navigate foreign environments, interact with locals, perform physical and mental challenges, and travel on a limited budget provided by the show. At each stop during the leg, teams receive clues inside sealed envelopes, which fall into one of these categories:

- Route Info: These are simple instructions that teams must follow before they can receive their next clue.
- Detour: A Detour is a choice between two tasks. Teams may choose either task and switch tasks if they find one option too difficult. There is usually one Detour present on each leg.
- Roadblock: A Roadblock is a task that only one team member can complete. Teams must choose which member will complete the task based on a brief clue they receive before fully learning the details of the task. There is usually one Roadblock present on each leg.
- Fast Forward: A Fast Forward is a task that only one team may complete, which allows that team to skip all remaining tasks on the leg and go directly to the next Pit Stop. Teams may only claim one Fast Forward during the entire race.

Most teams that arrive last at the Pit Stop of each leg are progressively eliminated, while the first team to arrive at the finish line in the final episode wins the grand prize of US$1,000,000.

== Production ==
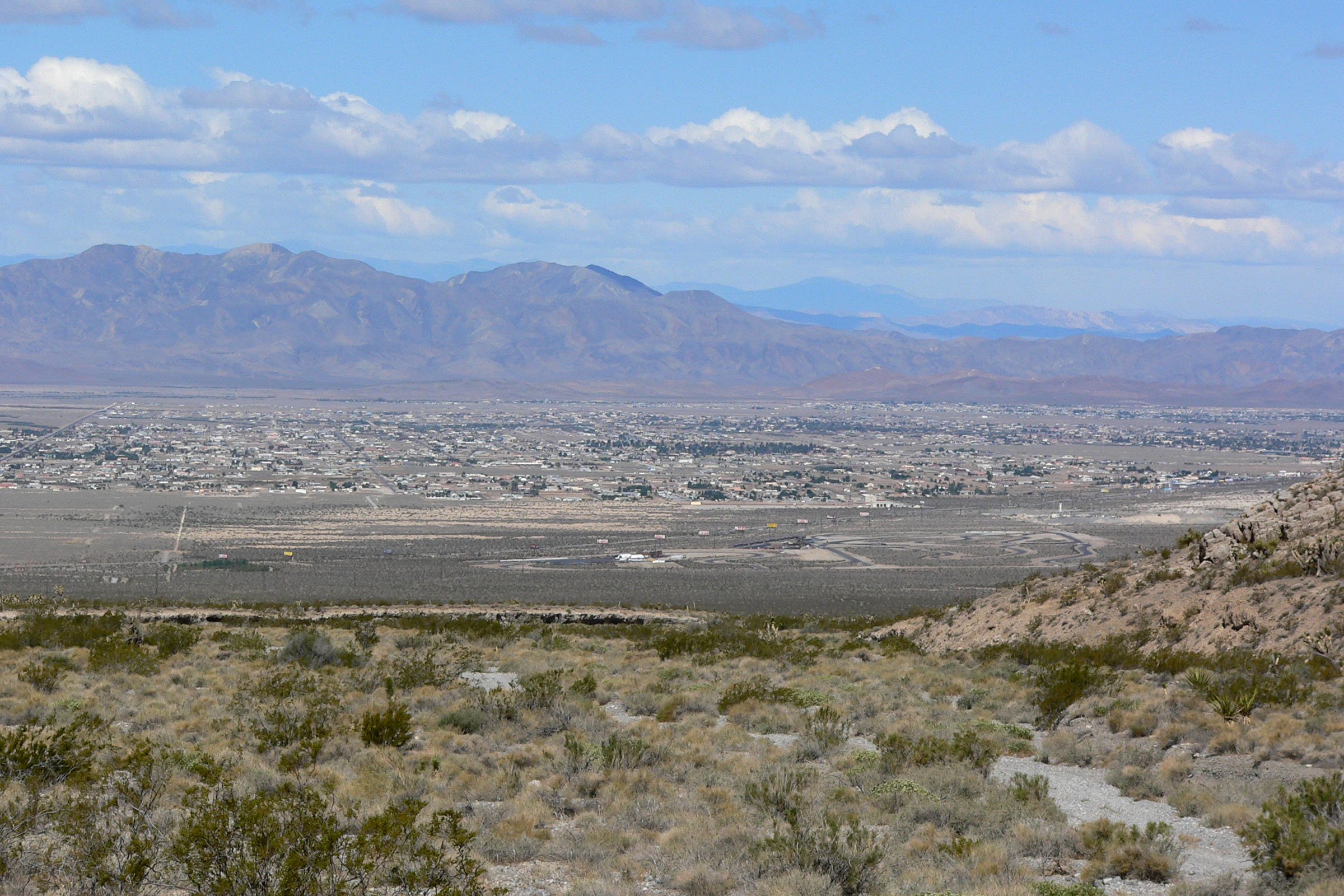
The overview of Pahrump, Nevada, from Pahrump Valley was the starting line of The Amazing Race 2.

The second season of The Amazing Race traveled 52,000 miles, spanning five continents and eight countries. Casting for the second season began during the summer of 2001, before the first season premiered. Casting finals were taking place in Los Angeles in September during the September 11 attacks. Location scouting took place during September 2001, but was paused for a month and a half following the September 11 attacks. Legs in Europe were excluded this season due to fears about subsequent attacks, and connecting flights through countries including India, Israel, and Nigeria were prohibited. Producers had also planned a leg in Argentina during pre-production, but cancelled it due to Argentina's political instability after its economy failed. Filming originally scheduled for fall 2001, was postponed to between January 7, 2002, and February 3, 2002 due to the September 11 attacks. Teams raced through eight countries, six of which were new to the series: Brazil, South Africa, Namibia, Hong Kong, Australia, and New Zealand.

The edition marked the debut of several show traditions. The color scheme for all route markers and flags was changed to yellow and red after the previous season's yellow and white. In addition, host Phil Keoghan and a local greeter welcomed all teams arriving at the Pit Stops at the end of each leg. Previously, Keoghan had appeared only to greet the last-place teams. Teams were also required to read their clues out loud on camera; this was optional for teams in the previous season.

== Contestants ==
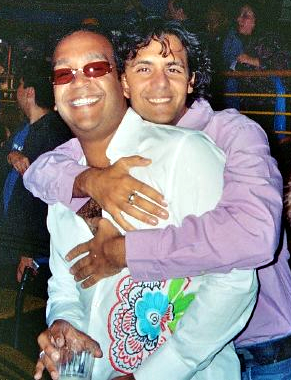
Oswald Mendez and Danny Jimenez

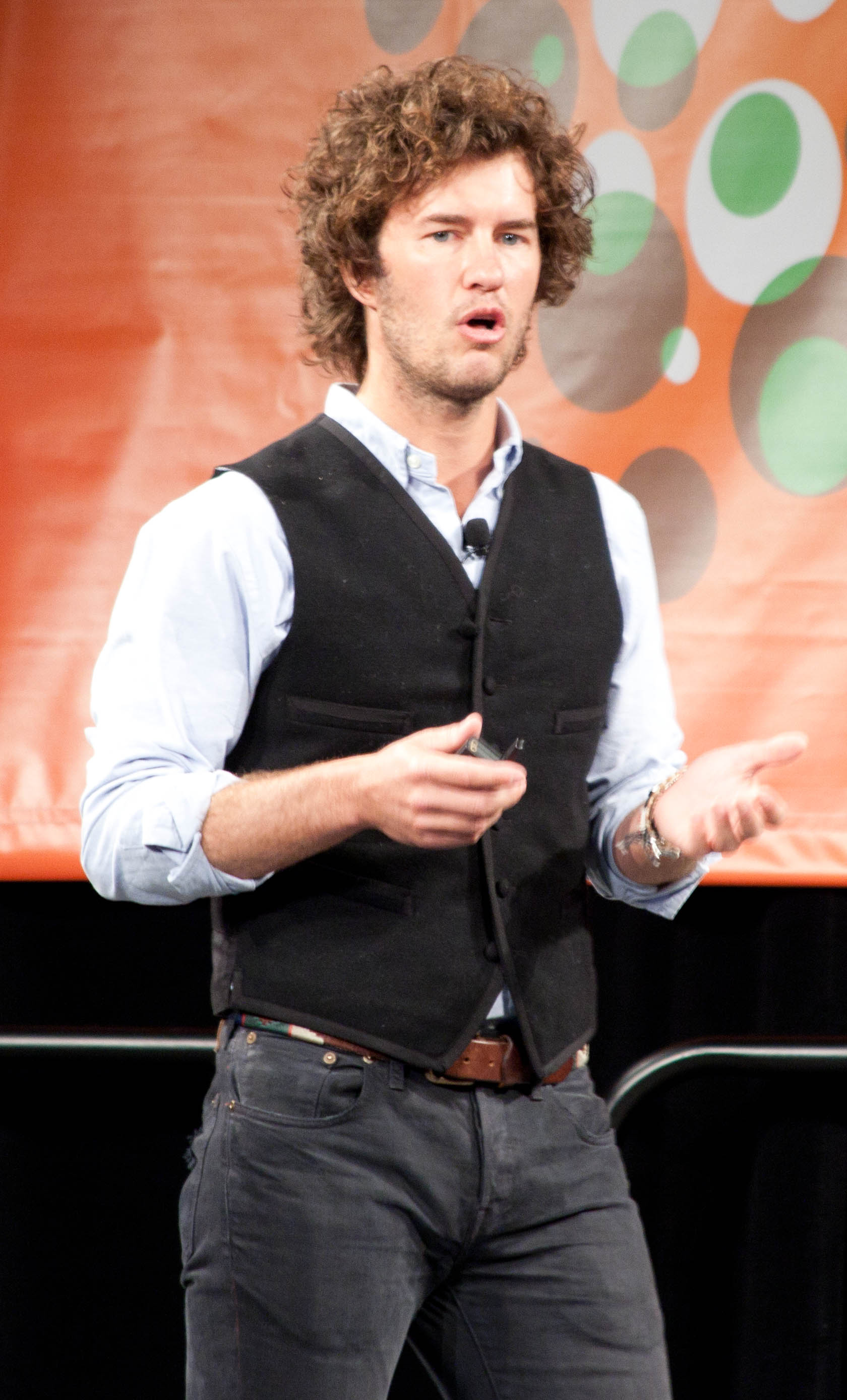
Blake Mycoskie

Eleven teams participated in the second season of The Amazing Race.

Contestants	Age	Relationship	Hometown	Status
Deidre Washington	51	Mother & Daughter	Miami, Florida	Eliminated 1st (in Rio de Janeiro, Brazil)
Hillary Washington	23	Mother & Daughter	Brooklyn, New York	Eliminated 1st (in Rio de Janeiro, Brazil)
Hope Davis	38	Married Parents	Clinton, Tennessee	Eliminated 2nd (in Iguaçu National Park, Brazil)
Norm Davis	39	Married Parents	Clinton, Tennessee	Eliminated 2nd (in Iguaçu National Park, Brazil)
Peggy Kuhn	63	Grandmothers	Truckee, California	Eliminated 3rd (in Stellenbosch, South Africa)
Claire Jinks	65	Grandmothers	Los Gatos, California	Eliminated 3rd (in Stellenbosch, South Africa)
Shola Richards	27	Twins	Albany, New York	Eliminated 4th (in Khomas Region, Namibia)
Doyin Richards	27	Twins	Albany, New York	Eliminated 4th (in Khomas Region, Namibia)
Cyndi Kalenberg	45	Pastors & Married Parents	Brainerd, Minnesota	Eliminated 5th (in Amphawa, Thailand)
Russell Kalenberg	46	Pastors & Married Parents	Brainerd, Minnesota	Eliminated 5th (in Amphawa, Thailand)
Mary Lenig	38	Sisters	Sunbury, Pennsylvania	Eliminated 6th (in Hong Kong)
Peach Krebs	33	Sisters	Paxinos, Pennsylvania	Eliminated 6th (in Hong Kong)
Gary Rosen	33	Former Roommates	New York City, New York	Eliminated 7th (in Breakaways National Park, Australia)
Dave Lepeska	28	Former Roommates	Brooklyn, New York	Eliminated 7th (in Breakaways National Park, Australia)
Oswald Mendez	31	Best Friends	Miami, Florida	Eliminated 8th (in Auckland, New Zealand)
Danny Jimenez	36	Best Friends	Miami, Florida	Eliminated 8th (in Auckland, New Zealand)
Blake Mycoskie	25	Brother & Sister	Nashville, Tennessee	Third place
Paige Mycoskie	21	Brother & Sister	Arlington, Texas	Third place
Tara Lynch	31	Separated Couple	Los Angeles, California	Runners-up
Wil Steger	37	Separated Couple	Los Angeles, California	Runners-up
Chris Luca	25	Lifelong Friends	Boston, Massachusetts	Winners
Alex Boylan	24	Lifelong Friends	Boston, Massachusetts	Winners

Future appearances

Oswald & Danny were selected to race in The Amazing Race: All-Stars.

Alex Boylan went on to create and host the first season of the WGN America online reality show Around the World for Free, in which he journeyed around the world with no money, relying on the generosity and hospitality of locals. Blake Mycoskie appeared as a guest shark during the twelfth season of Shark Tank.

== Results ==
The following teams are listed with their placements in each leg. Placements are listed in finishing order.

- A red placement with a dagger (†) indicates that the team was eliminated.
- An underlined blue placement with a double-dagger (‡) indicates that the team was the last to arrive at a Pit Stop in a non-elimination leg.
- A green ƒ indicates that the team won the Fast Forward.

Team placement (by leg)
Team	1	2	3	4	5	6	7	8	9	10	11	12	13
Chris & Alex	6th	2nd	7th	7th	1st	6th‡	2nd	2nd	1stƒ	3rd	3rd	3rd‡	1st
Tara & Wil	1st	3rd	2nd	2nd	3rd	5th	3rd	4th	3rd	2nd	1stƒ	1st (Note: Tara and Wil initially arrived 2nd, but were given a 1-minute credit due to a minor production difficulty. This allowed them to tie for 1st with Blake and Paige.)	2nd
Blake & Paige	4th (Note: Blake and Paige and Hope and Norm tied for 4th place after both teams stepped on the Pit Stop mat at the same time.)	9th	5th (Note: Blake and Paige and Shola and Doyin tied for 5th place after both teams stepped on the Pit Stop mat at the same time.)	4th	4th	3rd	5th	5th‡	2nd	1stƒ	2nd	1st	3rd
Oswald & Danny	8th	7th	1st	1stƒ	6th	4th	4th	1st	4th	4th‡	4th†		
Gary & Dave	9th	5th	3rd	3rd (Note: Gary and Dave initially arrived 2nd, but were issued a 42-minute penalty for speeding. As a result, Gary and Dave departed 3rd on the next leg.)	5th	2nd	1stƒ	3rd	5th†				
Mary & Peach	7th	4th	4th	5th	2nd	1st	6th†						
Cyndi & Russell	2nd	6th	8th	6th	7th†								
Shola & Doyin	3rd	1stƒ	5th	8th†									
Peggy & Claire	10th	8th	9th†										
Hope & Norm	4th	10th†											
Deidre & Hillary	11th†												

== Race summary ==
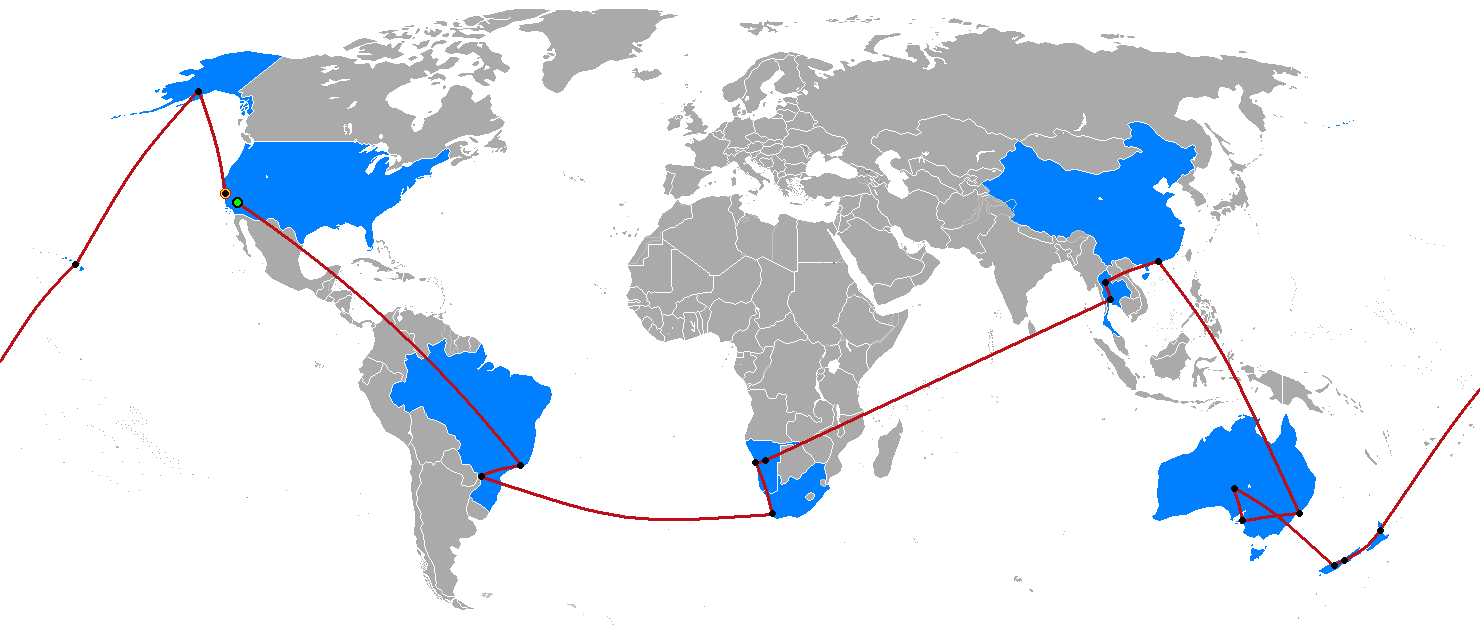
The route of The Amazing Race 2.

Destinations	Air travel Rail travel Water travel Bus travel Helicopter travel Bicycle travel Gondola travel
Route Markers	Detour Roadblock Fast Forward Pit Stop

=== Leg 1 (United States → Brazil) ===
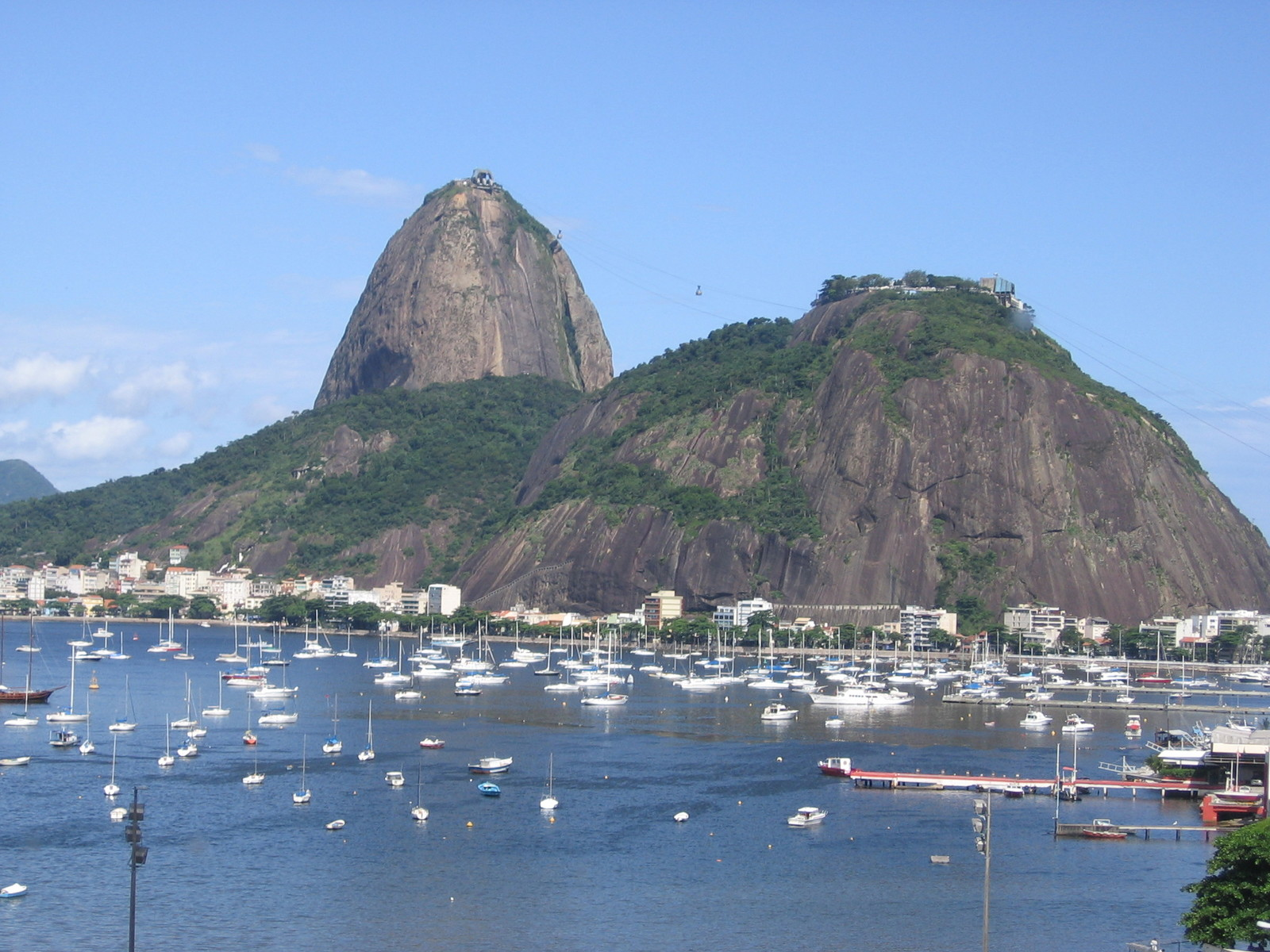
In Rio de Janeiro, teams traveled to Sugarloaf Mountain, where they found the season's first Detour.

- Episode 1: "The World Is Waiting: Go!" (March 11, 2002)
- Prize: A vacation to Hawaii (awarded to Tara and Wil)
- Eliminated: Deidre and Hillary

Locations

- Pahrump, Nevada (Pahrump Valley) (Starting Line)
- Las Vegas → Rio de Janeiro, Brazil
- Rio de Janeiro (Corcovado Mountain – Christ the Redeemer)
- Rio de Janeiro → Paquetá Island
- Paquetá Island (Fat Maria)
- Paquetá Island (Lido Hotel – Ilha Tours)
- Paquetá Island → Rio de Janeiro
- Rio de Janeiro (Sugarloaf Mountain)
- Rio de Janeiro (Sugarloaf Mountain or Ipanema Beach)
- Rio de Janeiro (Urca Beach → Guanabara Bay – Tocorimé)

Episode summary

- From Pahrump, Nevada, teams were instructed to fly to Rio de Janeiro, Brazil. Once there, teams had to climb to the top of Corcovado Mountain, where they found their next clue at the base of Christ the Redeemer.
- Teams had to travel to Paquetá Island, where they had to find a big tree known as Fat Maria and kiss the tree to receive their next clue. Teams then traveled to the Lido Hotel, where they had to sign up for one of four boats returning to the mainland the next morning. Teams spent the night on the island and traveled to Sugarloaf Mountain, where they found their next clue the next morning.
- This season's first Detour was a choice between Mountain and Beach. In Mountain, teams had to rappel down the face of Sugarloaf Mountain to receive their next clue. In Beach, teams had to take the gondola back down and go to Ipanema Beach to find Heloísa Pinheiro, the woman who inspired the song "The Girl from Ipanema", who gave them their next clue.
- After the Detour, teams had to check in at the Pit Stop aboard the Tocorimé, a yacht in Guanabara Bay.

=== Leg 2 (Brazil) ===
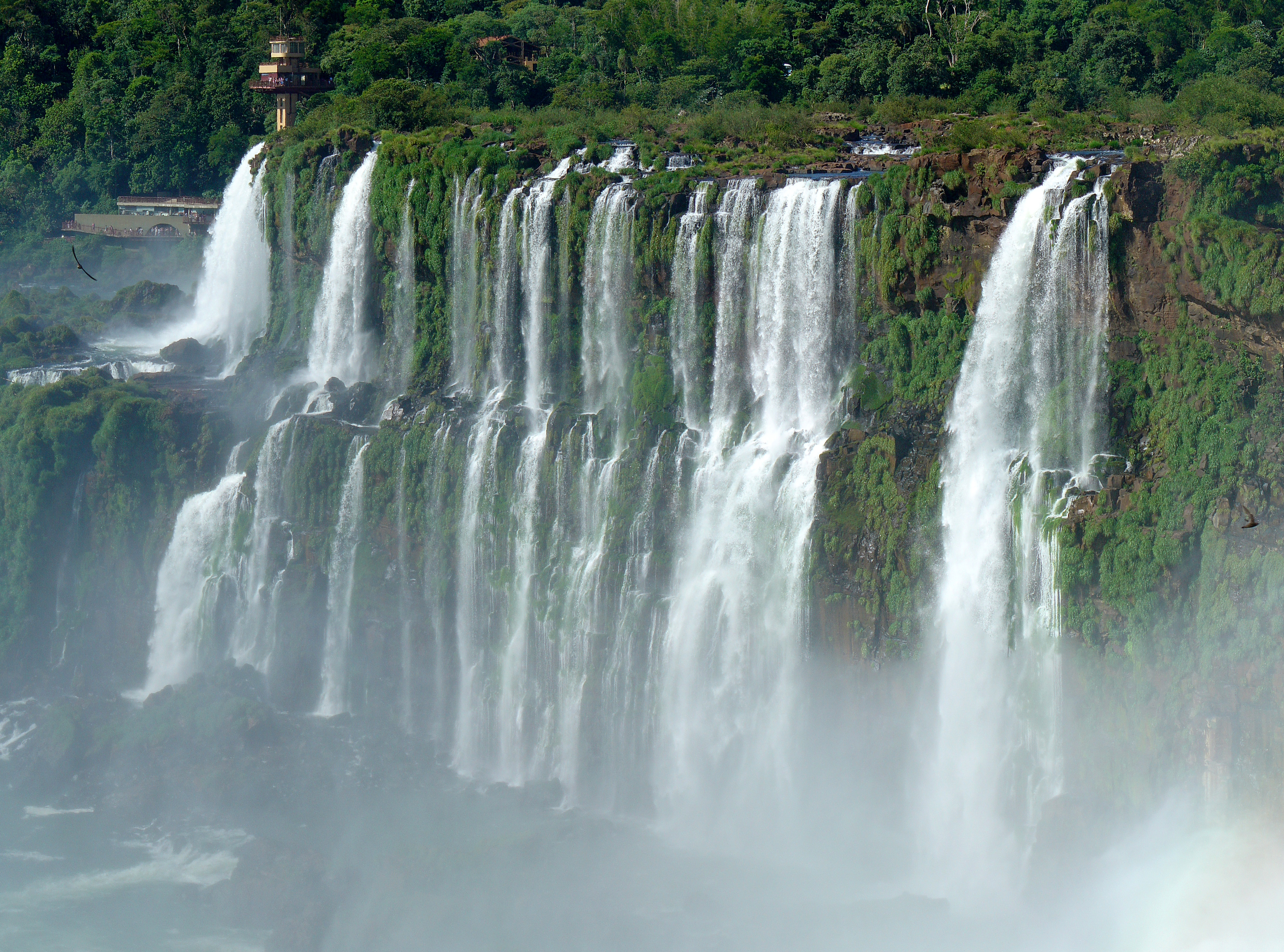
Teams visited Iguaçu Falls in Brazil during the second half of this leg.

- Episode 2: "Help Me, I'm American!" (March 13, 2002)
- Eliminated: Hope and Norm

Locations

- Rio de Janeiro (Guanabara Bay – Tocorimé)
- Rio de Janeiro (Barra da Tijuca – Acadêmicos da Barra da Tijuca)
- Rio de Janeiro (Copacabana Beach)
- Rio de Janeiro (Pedra Bonita)
- Rio de Janeiro (São Conrado Beach)
- Rio de Janeiro → Foz do Iguaçu
- Iguaçu National Park (Iguaçu Falls – Macuco Safari Dock)
- Iguaçu National Park (Trilha das Bananeiras – Jungle Camp)

Episode summary

- At the start of this leg, teams returned to Urca Beach and then traveled by taxi to Acadêmicos da Barra da Tijuca. In their clue, teams had also received a red feather, which they had to match to one of the dancers' headdresses in the club. Once they found the correct dancer, she gave teams their next clue.
- This leg's Fast Forward required teams to travel to Copacabana Beach and play volleyball against a local team. While racers were allowed to use their hands, the local team could only use their feet. Shola and Doyin won the Fast Forward.
- Teams who did not attempt the Fast Forward had to travel to Pedra Bonita to find their next clue.
- This leg's Detour was a choice between Freak Out and Seek Out. In Freak Out, teams had to hang glide in tandem with an instructor from the mountain to the beach below. Once both teammates landed on the beach, they were given their next clue. In Seek Out, teams had to travel down to the same beach and use a metal detector to find their next clue buried somewhere in the sand.
- After the Detour, teams had to travel by bus to Foz do Iguaçu and then drive to the Macuco Safari Dock, where they found their next clue.
- In this season's first Roadblock, one team member had to use a map to direct a speedboat driver to Iguaçu Falls. There, they had to spot the route marker at the top of a rock formation, retrieve their next clue, and head back to the dock.
- After the Roadblock, teams had to check in at the Pit Stop in a nearby jungle camp.

=== Leg 3 (Brazil → South Africa) ===
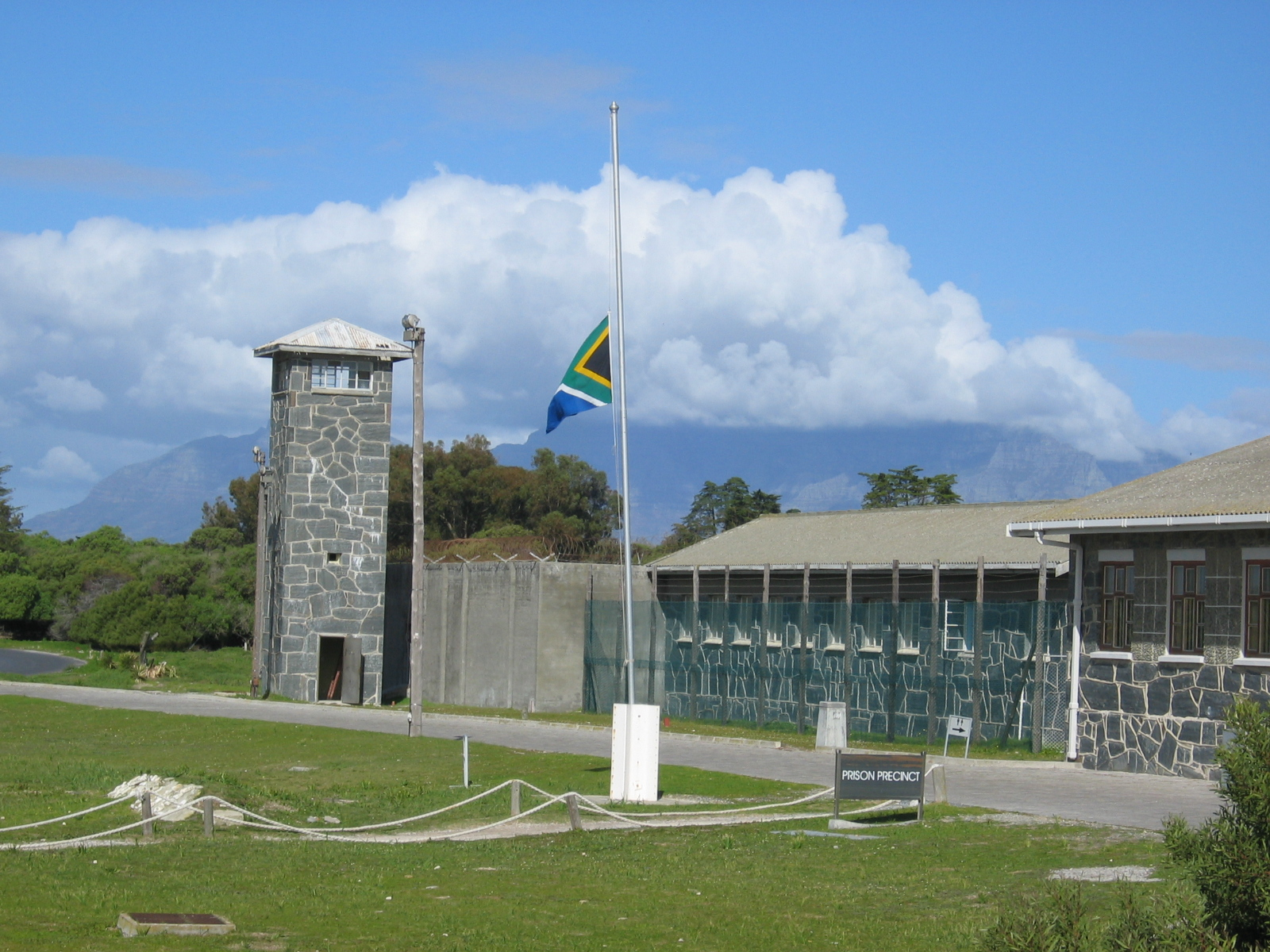
In Cape Town, teams traveled to Robben Island, where former South African President Nelson Mandela was once imprisoned.

- Episode 3: "My Alarm Clock Didn't Go Off!" (March 20, 2002)
- Eliminated: Peggy and Claire

Locations

- Iguaçu National Park (Trilha das Bananeiras – Jungle Camp)
- Foz do Iguaçu → Cape Town, South Africa
- Cape Town → Robben Island
- Robben Island (Maximum Security Prison)
- Robben Island → Cape Town
- Kalk Bay (Kalk Bay Harbour)
- Kalk Bay → Cape Town
- Cape Town (Langa – Paradise Hair Salon)
- Stellenbosch (Lanzerac Manor)

Episode summary

- At the start of this leg, teams were instructed to fly to Cape Town, South Africa. Once there, teams had to take a ferry to Robben Island and find their next clue in Nelson Mandela's prison cell. Teams then had to travel to Kalk Bay Harbour to find their next clue.
- This leg's Detour was a choice between Dance and Deliver. In Dance, teams had to perform a gumboot dance with a local troupe until they made R25 (roughly $1.40) in tips, which they could exchange for their next clue. In Deliver, teams had to carry fish from a boat and transfer them to a set of scales until they had 125 kg (276 lb) to receive their next clue.
- After the Detour, teams had to travel by train to Langa Township and find their next clue at the Paradise Hair Salon.
- In this leg's Roadblock, one team member had to search through Langa Township and buy a box of Epsom salts and a "Smiley" (a roasted sheep's head). They then had to deliver the Smiley as an offering to Ndaba Sangoma, who made a potion out of the salts that the racer had to drink to receive the next clue, which directed them to the Pit Stop: Lanzerac Manor in Stellenbosch.

Additional note

- Peggy and Claire flew from Brazil to South Africa via New York City and London, and arrived in Cape Town a full day after all of the other teams. Instead of completing all of the tasks in the leg, they received instructions at Robben Island to go directly to the Pit Stop for elimination.

=== Leg 4 (South Africa → Namibia) ===
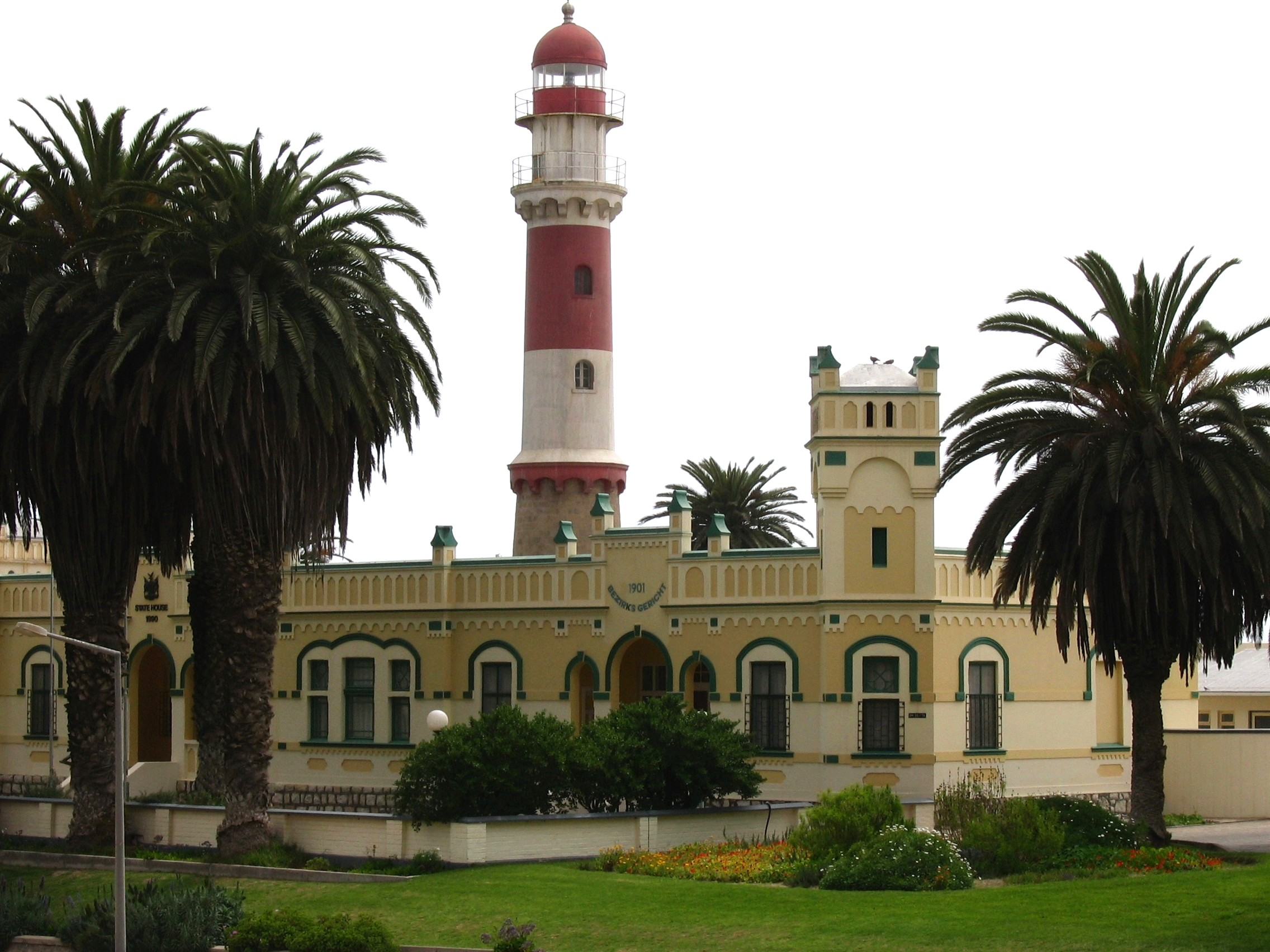
Teams found the Fast Forward clue at the Swakopmund Lighthouse in Namibia.

- Episode 4: "This Game Is About Minutes" (March 27, 2002)
- Eliminated: Shola and Doyin

Locations

- Stellenbosch (Lanzerac Manor)
- Cape Town (Cape Aviation Business Center) → Walvis Bay, Namibia (Walvis Bay Airport)
- Swakopmund (Swakopmund Lighthouse)
- Swakopmund (Swakopmund Hotel)
- Erongo Region (Dorob National Park – Matterhorn Sand Dune)
- Usakos (Spitzkoppe – General Dealer)
- Usakos (Spitzkoppe – Woodcarver's Market)
- Khomas Region (Amani Lodge)

Episode summary

- At the start of this leg, teams were provided a map and told to travel to the Cape Aviation Business Center at Cape Town International Airport and find Ryan Blake Air, where they signed up one of two charter flights to Walvis Bay, Namibia. Once there, teams were instructed to travel to the top of Swakopmund Lighthouse, where they found their next clue. From atop the lighthouse, teams had to spot a row of marked vehicles in a parking lot, where they found their next clue on the windshield.
- This leg's Fast Forward required one team to look "where the railway tracks used to run". Teams had to search the grounds of the Swakopmund Hotel for the Fast Forward award in the center of the pool. Oswald and Danny won the Fast Forward.
- Teams that did not attempt the Fast Forward had to travel to the Matterhorn Sand Dune, where they found their next clue.
- This leg's Detour was a choice between Slide and Stride. In Slide, teams had to slide down the side of the Matterhorn to their next clue at the bottom. In Stride, teams would have had to walk down the opposite side of the dune along a marked path to their next clue. All teams chose Slide, except for Shola and Doyin, who did not arrive until after access to the dunes had closed for the day.
- After the Detour, teams had to find the General Dealer convenience store in Spitzkoppe and ask for the "postcard of the day", which was their next clue.
- In this leg's Roadblock, one team member had to buy five wooden animal carvings – lion, leopard, rhinoceros, elephant, and African buffalo – using their own money and then bring the carvings to a bushman, who exchanged them for a large carved wooden giraffe with their next clue attached.
- After the Roadblock, teams had to take the giraffe carving to the Pit Stop at the Amani Lodge.

Additional note

- Shola and Doyin got their vehicle stuck in the sand and it took some time to extricate it. This caused them to arrive at the Detour after the hours of operation had closed for the day. As all of the other teams had completed the Detour and were able to check in at the Pit Stop, Shola and Doyin went directly to the Pit Stop without performing the Detour and were eliminated.

=== Leg 5 (Namibia → Thailand) ===
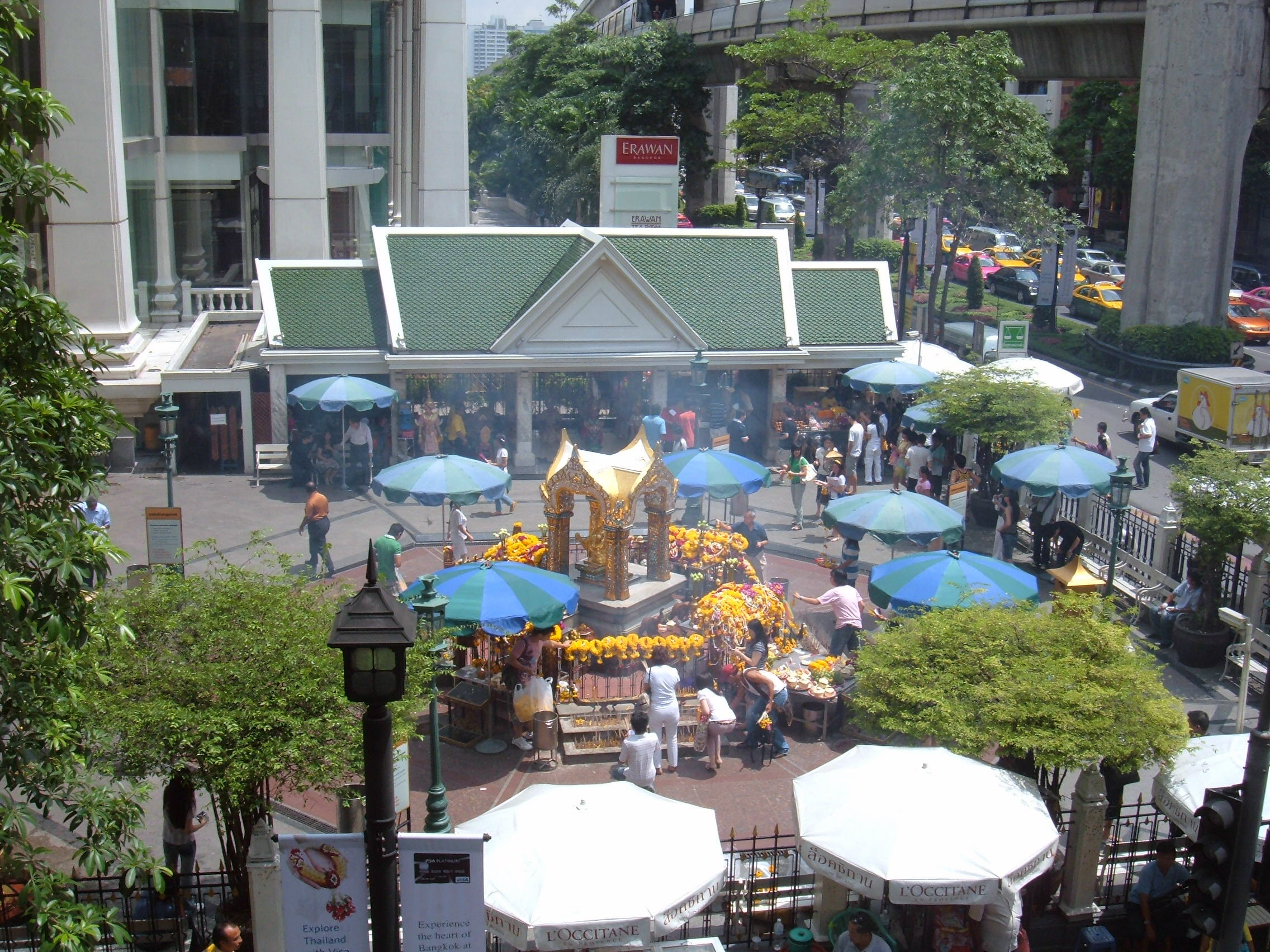
After arriving in Bangkok, teams traveled to the Erawan Shrine, where they had to perform a Detour.

- Episode 5: "Welcome To The World Of Being Human" (April 3, 2002)
- Eliminated: Cyndi and Russell

Locations

- Khomas Region (Amani Lodge)
- Windhoek → Bangkok, Thailand
- & Bangkok (Erawan Shrine)
- Bangkok (Bird Market or Chinatown)
- Bangkok → Ratchaburi
- Photharam (Wat Khao Chong Phran)
- Amphawa (Ban Plai Pong Pang)

Episode summary

- At the start of this leg, teams were instructed to travel to Windhoek and then fly to Bangkok, Thailand. Once there, teams had to travel to Erawan Shrine, where they found the next clue near the temple dancers.
- This leg's Detour was a choice between Confusion Now and Confusion Later. In Confusion Now, teams had to search for a specific water taxi dock and find the correct taxi that could take them to a bird market. Once there, they had to buy and release a cage full of sparrows. In Confusion Later, teams had to travel by taxi to Chinatown, where they had to purchase a "car" to burn at the Lee Ti Biew shrine. Teams had to figure out that the car they needed was one of the small paper cars sold at multiple booths near the shrine.
- After the Detour, teams then had to travel by bus to Ratchaburi and then travel to Wat Khao Chong Phran, where they found their next clue.
- In this leg's Roadblock, one team member had to don a protective mask, gloves, and boots, and venture into a nearby cave filled with millions of bats to retrieve their next clue, which directed them to the Pit Stop: Ban Plai Pong Pang in Amphawa.

=== Leg 6 (Thailand) ===
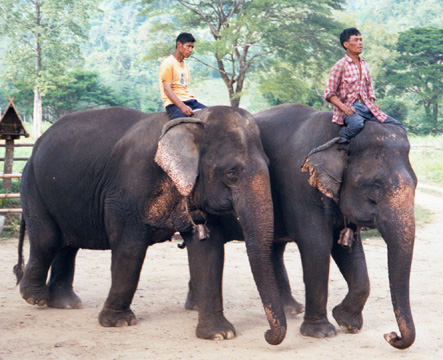
The Asian elephants of Northern Thailand were featured on this leg.

- Episode 6: "I'm Gonna Take His Girl" (April 10, 2002)

Locations

- Amphawa (Ban Plai Pong Pang)
- Bangkok (Pak Khlong Talad Flower Market)
- Bangkok → Chiang Mai
- Ban Muang Kut (Old Bridge)
- Ban Muang Kut (Mae Taeng River Camp)
- Chiang Mai Province (Mae Ping Village)
- Chiang Dao District (Karen Village)

Episode summary

- At the start of this leg, teams had to travel back to Bangkok and search for a flower vendor around Pak Khlong Talad for their next clue. Teams were then instructed to travel by train to Chiang Mai.
- This leg's Detour was a choice between Boat and Beast. In Boat, teams had to travel 1.5 miles (2.4 km) down the river using a bamboo raft with long wooden poles. In Beast, teams would have had to ride the same 1.5 miles (2.4 km) on an elephant down the path next to the river. All teams chose Boat and found their next clue on a marked car at the Mae Taeng River Camp.
- After the Detour, teams had to drive to Mae Ping Village to find their next clue.
- In this leg's Roadblock, one team member had to wash a series of chalk decorations off of an elephant to receive their next clue, which directed them to the Pit Stop: Karen Village in the Chiang Dao District.

Additional note

- This was a non-elimination leg.

=== Leg 7 (Thailand → Hong Kong) ===
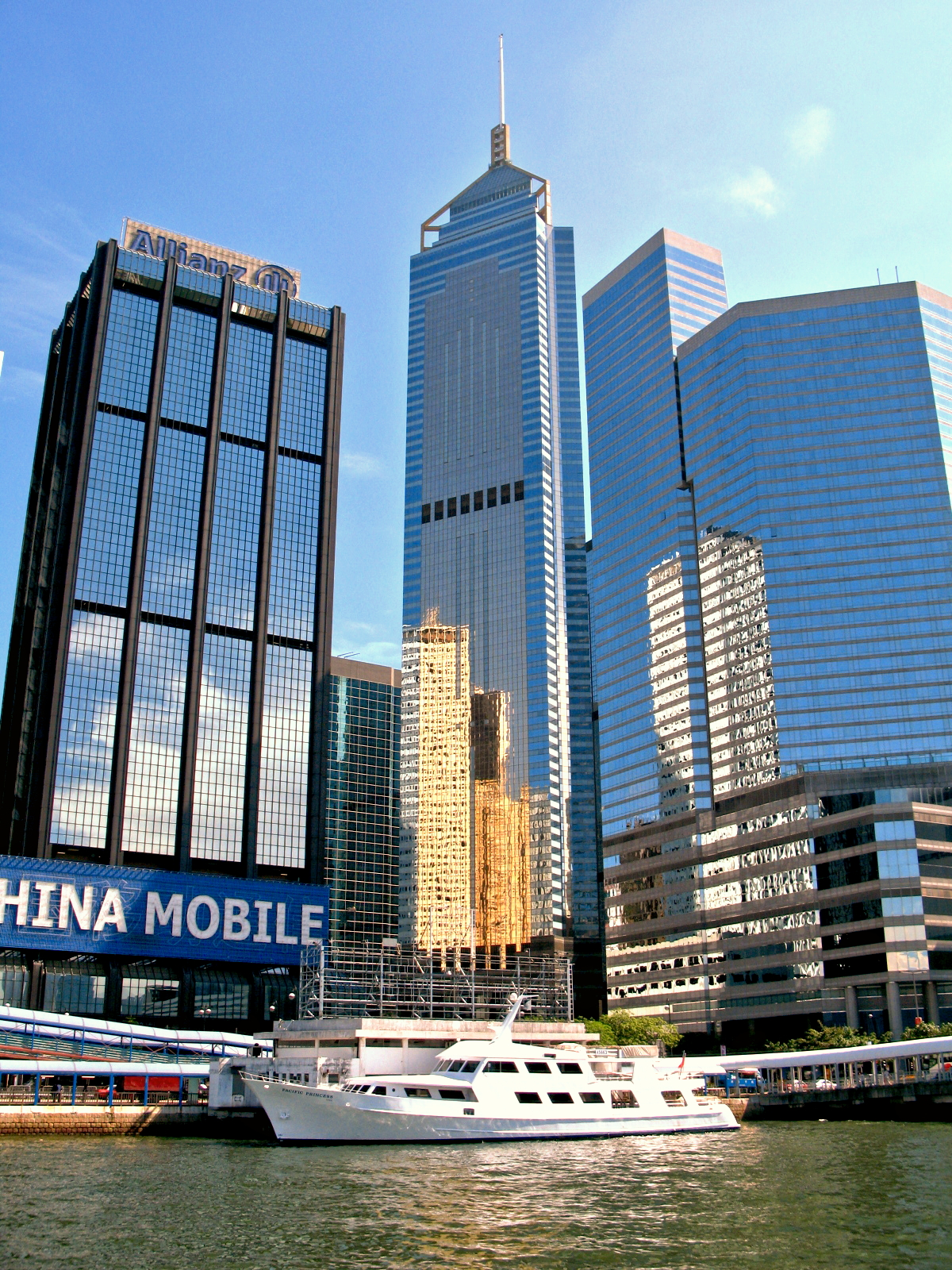
In Hong Kong, teams traveled to Central Plaza, where they had to search the skyline for the Star Ferry.

- Episode 7: "I'm Gonna Throw Up On Phil's Shoes" (April 17, 2002)
- Eliminated: Mary and Peach

Locations

- Chiang Dao District (Karen Village)
- Chiang Mai (Seven Spires)
- Chiang Mai → Hong Kong
- Hong Kong (Central Plaza)
- Hong Kong (Wong Tai Sin Temple)
- Hong Kong (Wan Chai Pier → Tsim Sha Tsui Ferry Pier)
- Hong Kong (Lam Tsuen or Sang Sang Medicine Hall)
- Hong Kong (Hongkong International Terminals)
- Hong Kong (Victoria Harbour – Duk Ling)

Episode summary

- At the start of this leg, teams were instructed to travel to the Seven Spires in Chiang Mai and find their next clue. Teams then had to fly to Hong Kong and go "to the top floor of the tallest building in Hong Kong", which they had to figure out was the Central Plaza.
- This leg's Fast Forward required one team to travel to Wong Tai Sin Temple in Kowloon, where a fortune teller gave one team member a face reading and the other a palm reading before giving them the Fast Forward award. Gary and Dave won the Fast Forward.
- Teams who did not attempt the Fast Forward had to use binoculars to search for a "green and white star that will take [them] to Tsim Sha Tsui", which they had to figure out was the Star Ferry terminal at Wan Chai Pier. Teams then had to travel by ferry to their next clue.
- This leg's Detour was a choice between Wishing Tree and Herbal Tea. In Wishing Tree, teams had to take a taxi to Lam Tsuen and find a wishing tree. Once there, both team members had to write a wish on a scroll and throw it into the tree to receive the next clue. In Herbal Tea, teams had to walk to a nearby herbalist shop on Reclamation Street and ask for a bitter herbal tea, which both team members had to each drink to receive the next clue.
- After the Detour, teams had to travel to the Hongkong International Terminals, where they found their next clue.
- In this leg's Roadblock, one team member had to use a crane to lift one shipping container off of a truck, lower it to the ground, and then return the crane to its original position. Their partner could then retrieve the next clue from the side of the shipping container.
- After the Roadblock, teams had to check in at the Pit Stop: the Duk Ling, a Chinese junk floating in Victoria Harbour.

Additional notes

- The boarding place of the sampan to the Pit Stop was wrongly identified as Aberdeen instead of Central, both on the CBS website and in Phil's narration. Yet, Alex, Wil, and Blake all directed their taxi drivers to Lung Wui Road instead. Wil even spelled out the road name to the taxi radio dispatcher for directions.
- Mary and Peach fell so far behind all of the other teams that instead of completing all of the tasks in this leg, they received instructions to go directly to the Pit Stop for elimination.

=== Leg 8 (Hong Kong → Australia) ===
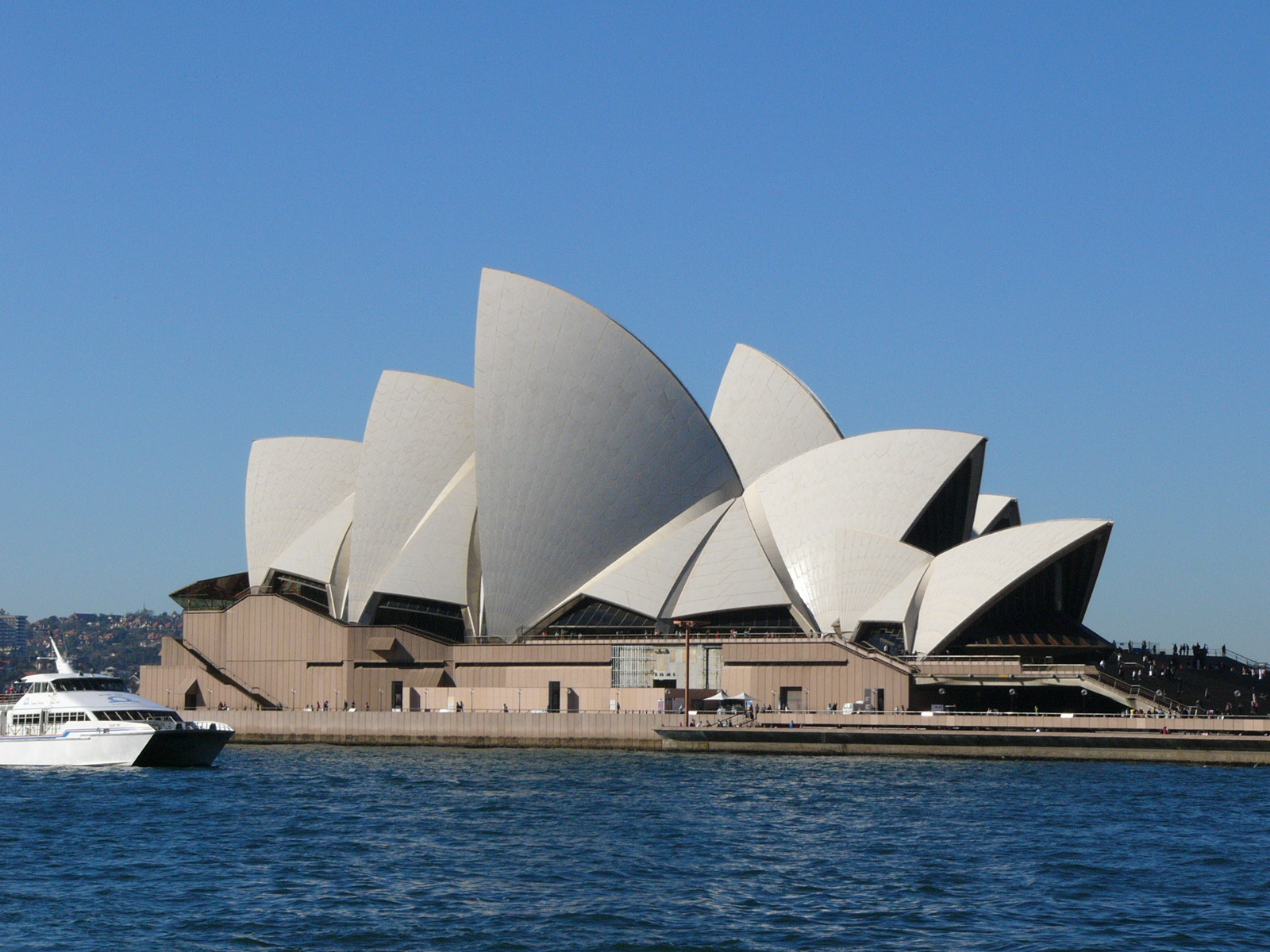
While in Sydney, teams visited the Sydney Opera House for the start of the Roadblock.

- Episode 8: "I'm Not a Miner! No, You're An Idiot!" (April 24, 2002)
- Prize: A seven-night Caribbean cruise (awarded to Oswald and Danny)

Locations

- Hong Kong (Victoria Harbour – Duk Ling)
- & Hong Kong (Repulse Bay – Repulse Bay Beach)
- Hong Kong (Repulse Bay – Kwun Yam Shrine)
- Hong Kong (Murray House)
- Hong Kong → Sydney, Australia
- Sydney (Sydney Opera House)
- Sydney (Martin Place, Hyde Park & Circular Quay)
- Sydney (Museum of Contemporary Art)

Episode summary

- At the start of this leg, teams had to take a sampan back ashore, travel by bus to Repulse Bay, and then find the statue of Tien-Hou at Kwun Yam Shrine, where they found their next clue. From there, teams had to travel to the Murray House to find their next clue.
- This leg's Detour was a choice between Dragon and Lion. In Dragon, teams had to row a twelve-seat dragon boat through a marked course to retrieve their next clue. In Lion, teams had to carry a ceremonial lion through a course of narrow markets and steep stairs to retrieve their clue.
- After the Detour, teams were instructed to fly to Sydney, Australia, and find their next clue at the Sydney Opera House.
- In this leg's Roadblock, one team member had to follow a series of clues written in Australian slang. Team members had to continue this task until they specifically received a clue instructing them to reunite with their partner, at which point they had to check in at the Pit Stop: the rooftop of the Museum of Contemporary Art.

Additional notes

- In this leg's unclaimed Fast Forward, one team would have traveled to the Po Lin Monastery and climbed up 268 steps to the Tian Tan Buddha to claim the Fast Forward award.
- Graham Keating, Sydney's town crier, served as the Pit Stop greeter for this leg.
- This was a non-elimination leg.

=== Leg 9 (Australia) ===
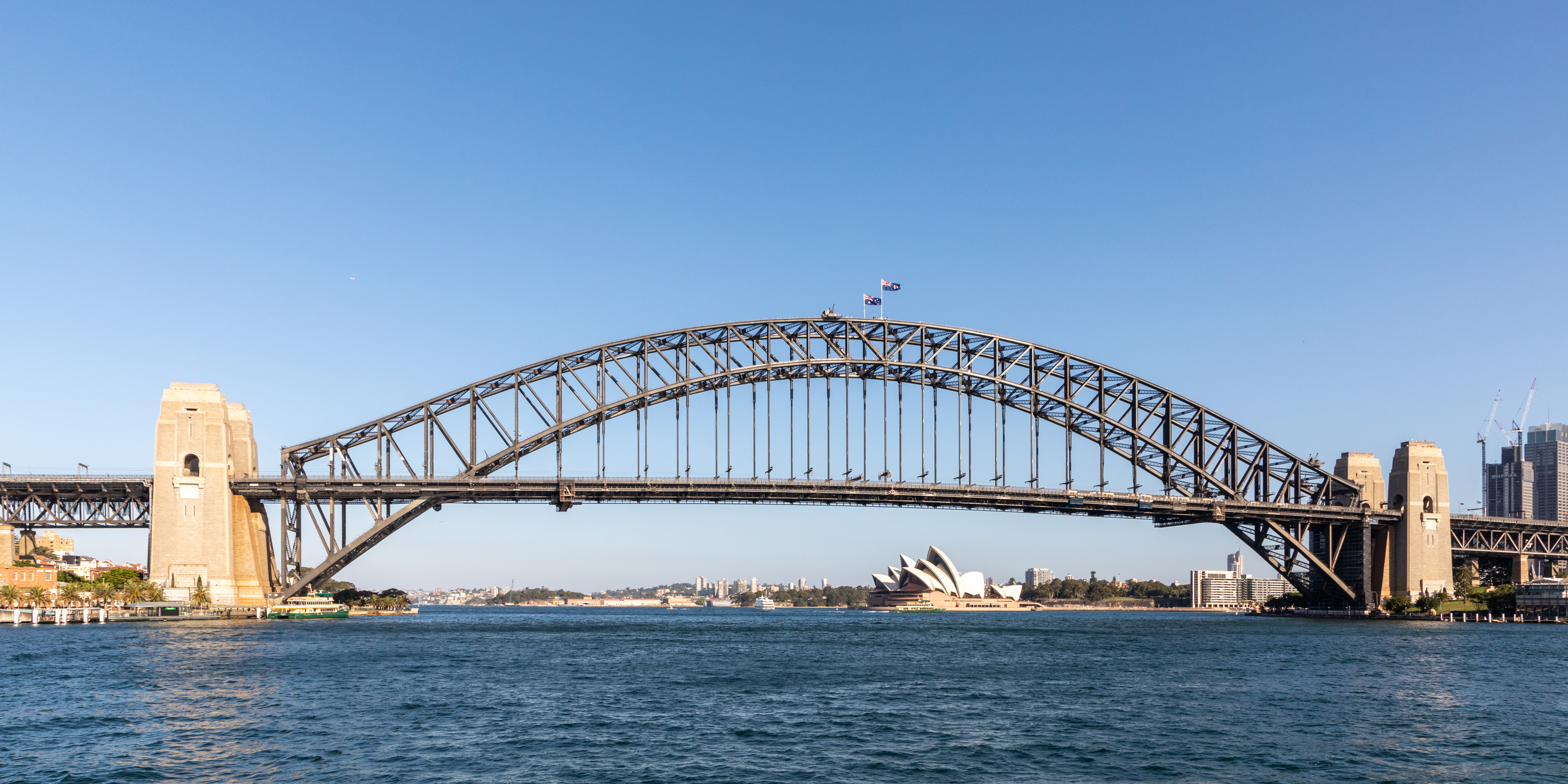
Teams began this leg by climbing to the top of the Sydney Harbour Bridge.

- Episode 8: "I'm Not a Miner! No, You're An Idiot!" (April 24, 2002)
- Prize: A vacation to Cancún (awarded to Chris & Alex)
- Eliminated: Gary and Dave

Locations

- Sydney (Museum of Contemporary Art)
- Sydney (Harry's Cafe de Wheels)
- Sydney (BridgeClimb Sydney & Sydney Harbour Bridge)
- Sydney → Adelaide
- Adelaide (Adelaide Airport – National Jet Systems Terminal)
- Adelaide → Coober Pedy
- Coober Pedy (Metal Tree Sculpture)
- Coober Pedy (Tom's Working Opal Mine or Coober Pedy Opal Fields Golf Club)
- Breakaways National Park (Lookout 2)
- Breakaways National Park (Aboriginal Camp)

Episode summary

- At the start of this leg, teams had to first sign up at BridgeClimb Sydney and then climb to the top of the Sydney Harbour Bridge to obtain their next clue.
- This leg's Fast Forward required one team to go to Harry's Cafe, where each team member had to eat a meat pie. Chris and Alex won the Fast Forward.
- Teams were instructed to fly to Coober Pedy in the Australian Outback. To get there, teams had to first fly to Adelaide and sign up for one of three charter flights to Coober Pedy. Once there, teams had to drive themselves to the Metal Tree sculpture, where they found their next clue.
- This leg's Detour was a choice between Cool Down and Heat Up. In Cool Down, teams had to find Opal Quest at Tom's Working Opal Mine, descend into the tunnels, and use traditional mining tools to search for an opal they could exchange for their next clue. In Heat Up, teams had to play three holes of golf using only a map and one ball on the driest golf course in the world to receive their next clue.
- After the Detour, teams had to travel to Lookout 2 of Breakaways National Park and follow a series of flags into a valley to find their next clue.
- In this leg's Roadblock, one team member had to throw a boomerang from within a circle so that the boomerang left, returned, and landed within the circle to receive their next clue, which directed them to the Pit Stop: a nearby Aboriginal camp.

Additional note

- Legs 8 and 9 aired back-to-back as a special two-hour episode.

=== Leg 10 (Australia → New Zealand) ===
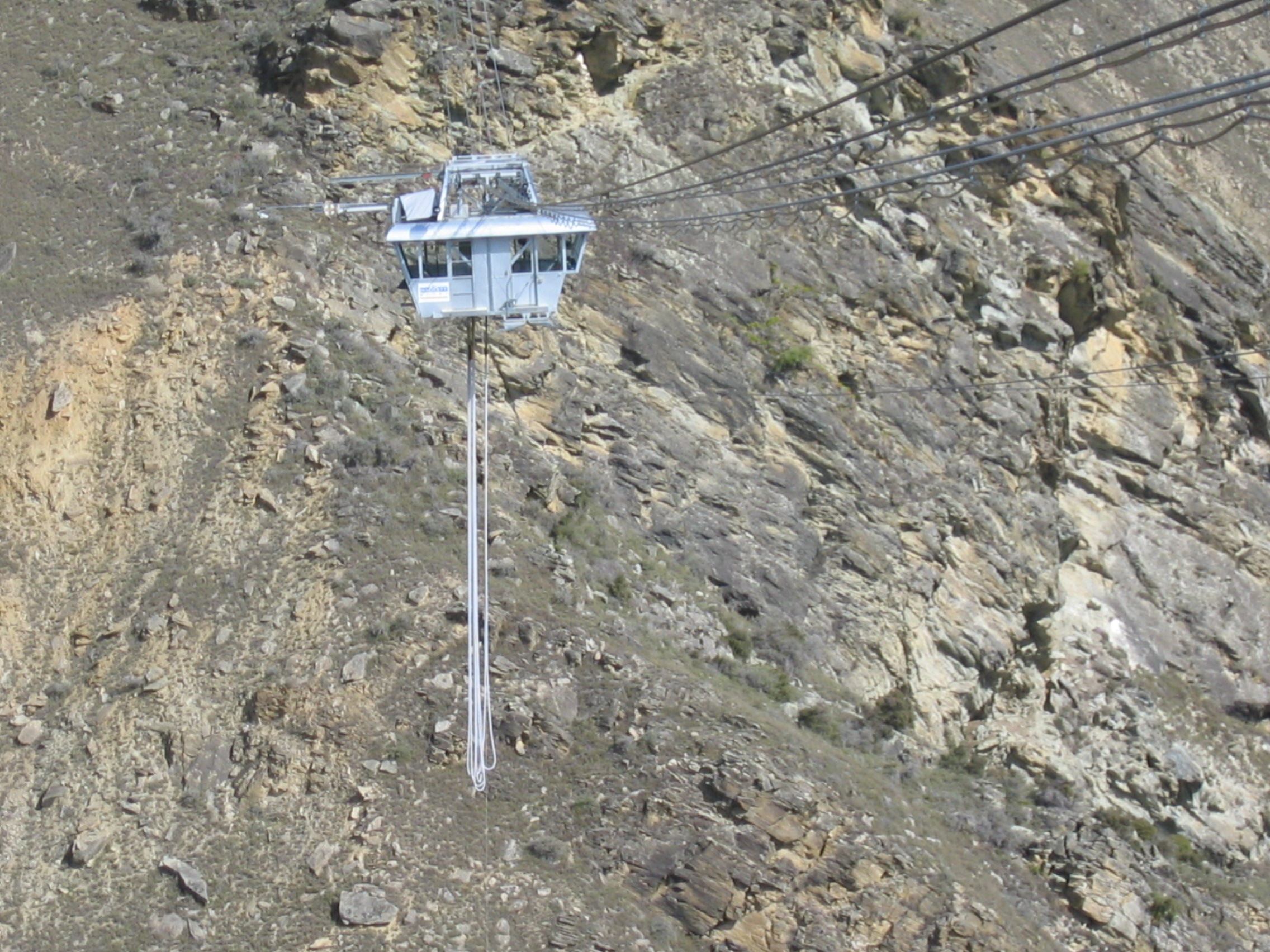
In the Quick Jump Detour task, teams had to bungee jump 450 feet (140 m) off the Nevis Highwire Platform.

- Episode 9: "Ready To Lose Our Lives" (May 1, 2002)
- Prize: A vacation to Puerto Rico (awarded to Blake and Paige)

Locations

- Breakaways National Park (Aboriginal Camp)
- Coober Pedy → Glendambo
- Glendambo → Adelaide
- Adelaide → Queenstown, New Zealand
- Queenstown (Shotover River)
- Gibbston (Wentworth Station)
- Gibbston (Nevis Highwire Platform)
- Mount Somers (Canterbury Plains – Inverary Sheep Station)

Episode summary

- At the start of this leg, teams were instructed to fly to Queenstown, New Zealand. This required teams to drive back to Coober Pedy and load their vehicles onto a trailer called a road train that transported them to Glendambo. They then drove to a local airstrip and signed up one of two charter flights to Adelaide. From there, teams were able to book flights to Queenstown.
- This leg's Fast Forward required one team to travel to the Shotover River. There, they had to ride a jetboat and spot a Route Marker. Blake and Paige won the Fast Forward.
- At Wentworth Station, teams found marked vehicles and instructed their drivers to take them to the edge of a cliff. From there, two teams at a time could ride a gondola that took them across the gorge to the Nevis Highwire Platform.
- This leg's Detour was a choice between Quick Jump and Long Hike. In Quick Jump, teams had to take a tandem bungee jump down to the clue at the bottom of the canyon. In Long Hike, teams would have had to hike down a long trail to the bottom of the canyon to reach the clue box. All teams chose Quick Jump.
- After the Detour, teams had to drive to Inverary Sheep Station, where they found their next clue.
- In this leg's Roadblock, one team member had to enter a pen full of sheep and move the three black sheep from among the white sheep to a second pen at the end of the corral. When they were finished, teams could then run to the nearby Pit Stop.

Additional note

- This was a non-elimination leg.

=== Leg 11 (New Zealand) ===
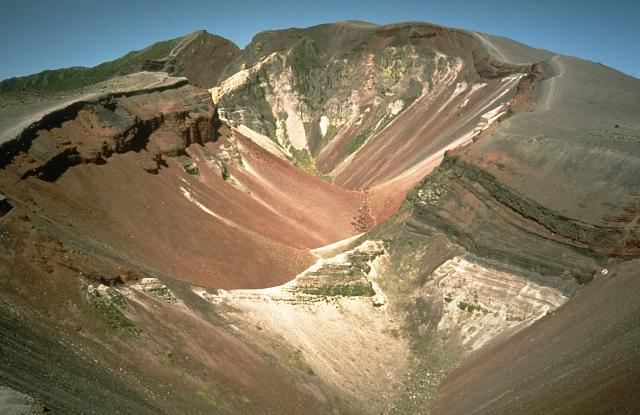
The Fast Forward in this leg required one team to do a scree run down Mount Tarawera, New Zealand's North Island dormant volcano.

- Episode 10: "It's Hammer Time" (May 8, 2002)
- Prize: A vacation to Los Cabos, Mexico (awarded to Tara and Wil)
- Eliminated: Oswald and Danny

Locations

- Mount Somers (Canterbury Plains – Inverary Sheep Station)
- Picton → Wellington
- Rotorua (Maori Arts and Crafts Institute)
- Rotorua District (Mount Tarawera)
- Waitomo District (Waitomo Caves – The Lost World)
- Auckland (Woodhill – 4 Track Adventures)
- Auckland (Ardmore Airport – Warbirds Hangar)

Episode summary

- At the start of this leg, teams chose a campervan, which they used for the remainder of the leg. Teams then had to travel by ferry to Wellington and then drive to the Maori Arts and Crafts Institute, where they found their next clue.
- This season's final Fast Forward required one team to perform a "scree run" down Mount Tarawera: a run down the loose rock walls directly into the mouth of the dormant volcano. Tara and Wil won the Fast Forward.
- Teams who did not attempt the Fast Forward had to travel to Waitomo Caves to find their next clue.
- This leg's Detour was a choice between Drop and Climb. In Drop, teams had to descend into a cavern known as "The Lost World" and then walk a short distance to their next clue. In Climb, teams would have had to climb down a ladder into the same cavern, and then walk a much longer distance to their next clue. All teams chose Drop.
- After the Detour, teams had to drive to 4 Track Adventures, which had their next clue.
- In this leg's Roadblock, one team member had to ride an all-terrain vehicle through an off-road course over difficult terrain and then collect their next clue at the end of the course that directed them to the Pit Stop: the Warbirds Hangar at the Ardmore Airport in Auckland.

=== Leg 12 (New Zealand → United States) ===
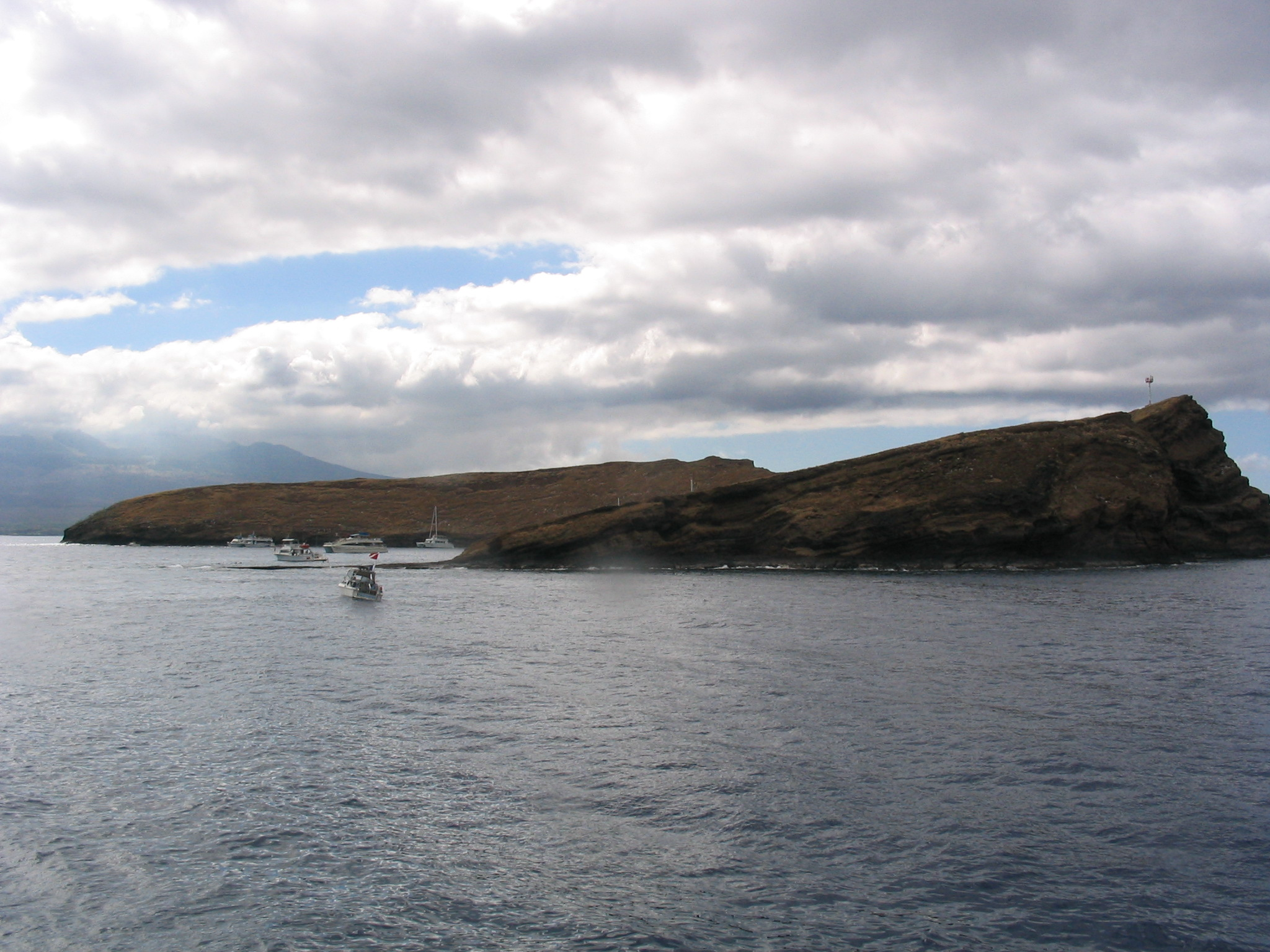
Teams traveled to the island of Molokini in Hawaii to perform a Roadblock.

- Episode 11: "Follow That Plane!" (May 15, 2002)
- Prize: A vacation to London and Paris (awarded to Tara and Wil & Blake and Paige)

Locations

- Auckland (Ardmore Airport – Warbirds Hangar)
- Auckland (One Tree Hill – Sir John Logan Campbell Monument)
- Auckland → Kahului, Hawaii
- Paia (Old Maui High School)
- Haiku-Pauwela (Pauwela Pineapple Field)
- Maalaea (McGregor Point) → Molokini
- Mokulau (Huialoha Church)

Episode summary

- At the start of this leg, teams were directed to find the "Father of Auckland". They had to figure out that their next destination was the Monument of Sir John Logan Campbell at One Tree Hill, where they found their next clue. Teams were then instructed to fly to Maui, Hawaii. Once there, teams had to drive to the ruins of an abandoned sugar mill and search for their next clue.
- This season's final Detour was a choice between Bike and Walk. In Bike, teams would have had to search a large pineapple field on bicycles to find the only red plastic pineapple that held their clue inside. In Walk, teams searched the same field on foot to find one of four yellow plastic pineapples which also held their clue inside. All teams chose Walk.
- After the Detour, teams headed to McGregor Point, where they had to navigate arrows to the water's edge and choose a motorboat to take them to Molokini, where they found their next clue.
- In this leg's Roadblock, one team member had to snorkel near the sunken island and find one of three yellow cases chained underwater to retrieve the clue sealed inside, which directed them to the Pit Stop: the Huialoha Church in Mokulau.

Additional note

- This was a non-elimination leg.

=== Leg 13 (United States) ===
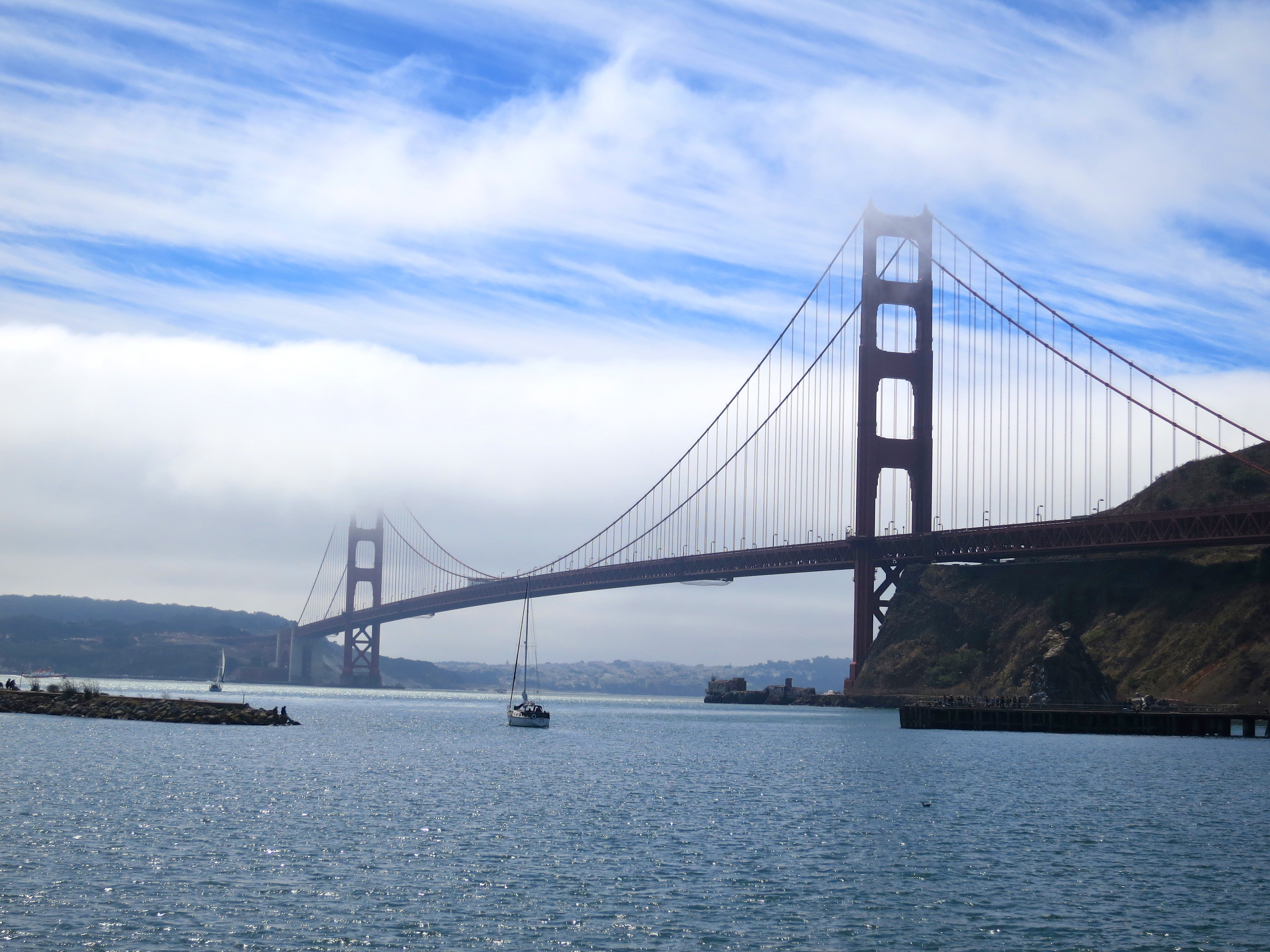
Fort Baker in Sausalito, California, overlooking the Golden Gate Bridge, hosted the finish line of The Amazing Race 2.

- Episode 11: "Follow That Plane!" (May 15, 2002)
- Prize: US$1,000,000
- Winners: Chris and Alex
- Runners-up: Tara and Wil
- Third place: Blake and Paige

Locations

- Mokulau (Huialoha Church)
- Hāna (Queen Kaʻahumanu's Birthplace)
- Kahului → Anchorage, Alaska
- Anchorage (Lake Hood Seaplane Base – Rust's Flying Service) → Trapper Creek (Campsite)
- Trapper Creek (Scotty Lake)
- Big Lake (Homesteader's Hardware Store)
- Matanuska-Susitna Borough (Hurricane Gulch Bridge)
- Anchorage or Fairbanks → Oakland, California
- San Francisco (Atkinson-Esher House)
- San Francisco (Municipal Pier)
- Sausalito (East Fort Baker)

Episode summary

- At the start of this leg, teams had to drive themselves to a pier in Hana Bay and find Queen Kaʻahumanu's birthplace to find their next clue, which instructed them to fly to Anchorage, Alaska. Once there, teams had to find Rust's Flying Service and instruct a pilot to fly them to Trapper Creek. Teams then spent the night in igloos.
- The next morning, teams had to don snowshoes and hike through the woods to their next clue. Teams then had to drive a Snowcat across a frozen lake to their next clue, which instructed them to drive to Homesteader's Hardware Store and pick up a set of tools along with their next clue. Teams were then instructed to drive to the Hurricane Gulch Bridge.
- In this season's final Roadblock, one team member had to use any of the tools they'd picked up to retrieve their clue which was frozen inside a large globe of ice.
- After the Roadblock, teams were instructed to fly to Oakland, California. Once there, teams had to find the Atkinson-Esher House in San Francisco to find their next clue, which instructed them to travel on foot to Municipal Pier. There, they found their final clue, which directed them to travel to East Fort Baker and then run to the finish line.

Additional notes

- Though Tara and Wil arrived at East Fort Baker first, Chris and Alex arrived shortly afterward, and overtook Tara and Wil in a footrace to the finish line.
- Legs 12 and 13 aired back-to-back as a special two-hour episode.

== Reception ==
The Amazing Race 2 received positive reviews with the final footrace to the finish often regarded as one of the show's best moments. Linda Holmes of Television Without Pity wrote that "the teams weren't as compelling as personalities this go-round" compared to the previous season but it was "still just a really good show". In 2016, this season was ranked 11th out of the first 27 seasons by the Rob Has a Podcast Amazing Race correspondents. Kareem Gantt of Screen Rant wrote that this season was "where the show finally gained its sea legs. This season went bold with its Roadblocks, and it also contained a good amount of drama that kept fans on the edge of their seats all season long." In 2021, Jane Andrews of Gossip Cop ranked this season as the show's overall best season. In 2022, Jason Shomer of Collider ranked this season among the show's top seven seasons. In 2022, Rhenn Taguiam of Game Rant ranked this season as the ninth-best season. In 2024, Taguiam's ranking was updated with this season ranked 14th out of 36.

== Ratings ==
No. overall	No. in season	Title	Original release date	U.S. viewers (millions)	Rating/share (18–49)
14	1	"The World Is Waiting: Go!"	March 11, 2002	8.95	3.9/10
15	2	"Help Me, I'm American!"	March 13, 2002	12.50	5.8/14
16	3	"My Alarm Clock Didn't Go Off!"	March 20, 2002	13.29	6.1/15
17	4	"The Game Is About Minutes"	March 27, 2002	9.73	4.1/10
18	5	"Welcome to the World of Being Human"	April 3, 2002	10.09	4.4/11
19	6	"I'm Gonna Take His Girl"	April 10, 2002	8.97	3.9/10
20	7	"I'm Gonna Throw Up on Phil's Shoes"	April 17, 2002	8.85	3.8/10
21	8	"I'm Not a Miner! No, You're an Idiot!"	April 24, 2002	9.56	4.5/12
22	9	"Ready to Lose Our Lives"	May 1, 2002	8.80	3.8/10
23	10	"It's Hammer Time"	May 8, 2002	9.95	4.2/10
24	11	"Follow That Plane!"	May 15, 2002	11.25	5.2/14

== Works cited ==
- Castro, Adam-Troy (2006). My Ox Is Broken!. BenBella Books. ISBN 978-1-932100-91-4.
