= Paige Mycoskie =

American fashion designer and businesswoman

Paige Mycoskie is an artist, fashion designer, and businesswoman, best known as the founder and owner of the lifestyle and fashion brand, Aviator Nation. Paige's brand story is featured in Forbes showcasing her success as a female entrepreneur. She was named GQ Magazines Designer of the Year, one of LA Business Journals Top Bosses Under 30. She and her brother Blake Mycoskie were runners up and contestants on season 2 of The Amazing Race.

== Early life and education ==
Mycoskie was born in Arlington, Texas to Pam Mycoskie, an author and Mike Mycoskie, an orthopedic surgeon. She has two siblings: younger brother Tyler Mycoskie and older brother Blake Mycoskie, founder of TOMS Shoes.

She attended Arlington Martin High School. She was on the Arizona State University Water Ski Team while attending ASU's Walter Cronkite School of Journalism.

== Career ==
In 2001, Paige moved to Southern California and began her career at Shape Magazine and shifted focus to freelance photography, video, graphic design, and branding. She developed successful campaigns in branding and commercials, including TOMS Shoes. She became a buyer's assistant at ZJ Boarding House in Venice, CA. With a passion for entrepreneurship and design Paige decided to create her own clothing line - sewing, dying, and designing each piece herself.

Her 70's-inspired, California lifestyle brand, Aviator Nation, was established in 2006 with the focus to create quality Made in America clothing. Today Aviator Nation has 17 store locations within the US and a factory in downtown Los Angeles that employs over 300 people. The garments are still made in America and Paige continues to inspire other companies to push the limits on manufacturing local. Paige connects fashion with music while raising funds for charities, she has worked with a variety of nonprofits including Charity Water; Surf Aid; Heal the Bay; The Flatwater Foundation; and Global Citizen. The brand also has partnerships with Austin City Limits Music Festival; Lollapalooza; SXSW, BottleRock and with John Mayer's previous concert tours.

The company is also expanding Aviator Nation's retail “experiences,” each tailored to the brand's 17 physical locations. The new store in Nashville and the Austin location double as a live-music venue. Aviator Nation Dreamland, in the old Malibu Inn, is a mix between a concert/event space and a restaurant bar. In April Aviator Nation RIDE opened, a combination cycling, boxing and yoga gym.

== The Amazing Race ==
in January 2002, Mycoskie competed on the second season of the CBS adventure reality show The Amazing Race with her older brother Blake. The two reached the final leg of the race and finished in third place.

=== The Amazing Race 2 finishes ===
- An underlined blue placement with a double-dagger (‡) indicates that Blake and Paige were the last to arrive at a pit stop in a non-elimination leg.
- A green ƒ indicates that Blake and Paige won the Fast Forward.

Roadblocks performed by Paige are bolded

Episode	Leg	Destination(s)	Detour choice (underlined)	Roadblock performance	Placement	Notes
1	1	United States → Brazil	Mountain/Beach	No Roadblock	4th of 11	(Note: Blake & Paige tied with Hope and Norm for 4th place.)
2	2	Brazil	Freak Out/Seek Out	**Paige**	9th of 10	
3	3	Brazil → South Africa	Dance/Deliver	Blake	5th of 9	(Note: Blake & Paige tied with Shola and Doyin for 5th place.)
4	4	South Africa → Namibia	Slide/Stride	Blake	4th of 8	
5	5	Namibia → Thailand	Confusion now/Confusion later	Blake	4th of 7	
6	6	Thailand	Boat/Beast	Blake	3rd of 6	
7	7	Thailand → Hong Kong	Wishing tree/Herbal tea	Blake	5th of 6	
8	8	Hong Kong → Australia	Dragon/Lion	Blake	5th of 5‡	(Note: Blake completed the roadblock incorrectly and had to redo it.)
8	9	Australia	Cool down/Heat up	**Paige**	2nd of 5	
9	10	Australia → New Zealand	Used fast forward		1st of 4ƒ	
10	11	New Zealand	Drop/Climb	**Paige**	2nd of 4	
11	12	New Zealand → United States	Bike/Walk	Blake	1st of 3	
11	13	United States	No Detour	Blake	3rd of 3	

== Personal life ==
Spending time in her home state of Texas, Paige enjoys being out on the lake. She has a passion for music, loves to travel and stays active through surfing, snowboarding and daily exercise for her mental health and wellness.

== Press & Media ==
https://www.forbes.com/sites/jemimamcevoy/2022/06/13/how-selling-160-sweatpants-turned-a-socal-surfer-into-one-of-americas-richest-women/

https://www.gq.com/story/announcing-the-2013-gq-best-new-menswear-designers-in-america

https://schedule.sxsw.com/2022/events/OE42494

https://www.aviatornation.com/blogs/news/112322887-malibu-magazine-paige-mycoskie-feature

https://www.aspentimes.com/magazines/aspen-times-weekly/alpine-aesthetic-aviator-nation-founder-paige-mycoskies-perfect-day-in-aspen/

https://podcasts.apple.com/us/podcast/pretty-cool-paige-mycoskie-founder-of-aviator-nation/id1550883345?i=1000520419007

https://oceandrive.com/blogs/tag/paige-mycoskie

https://www.createcultivate.com/blog/paige-mycoskie-workparty-interview/
