= Two Degrees Food =

Philanthropic vegan bar company

Two Degrees
- Founded: 2010
- Founder: Will Hauser and Lauren Walters
- Defunct: February 1, 2017
- Headquarters: San Francisco, California
- Products: Nutritious Vegan Snack

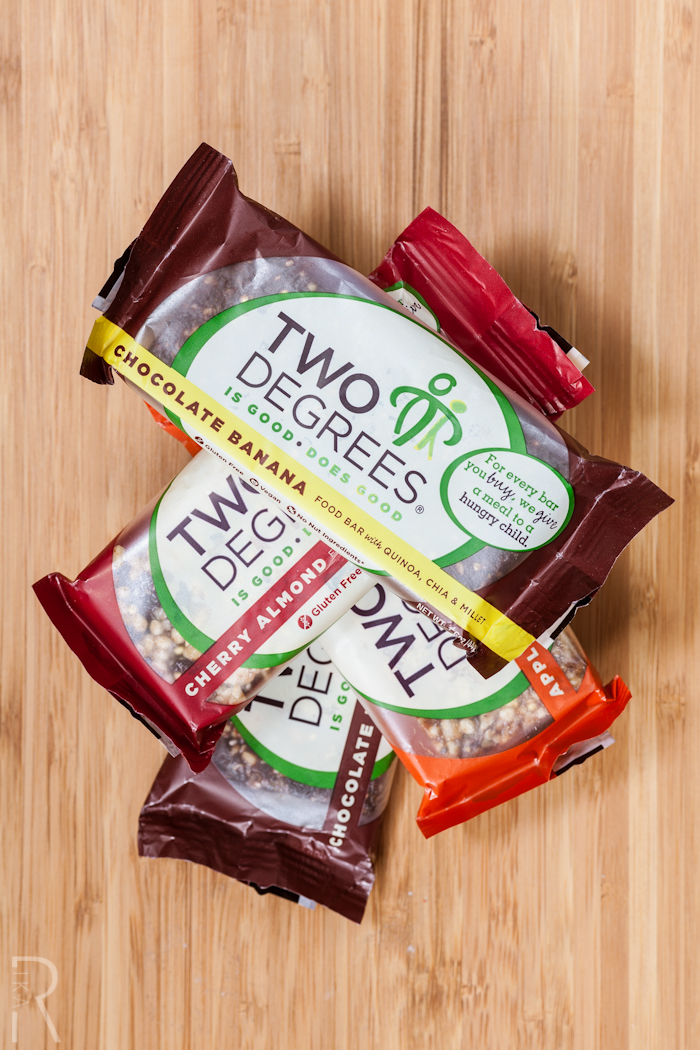
Two Degrees Food products display

Two Degrees Food was a one-for-one food company that produced vegan snack bars. One of their main ways to promote their business was using some of their profit to give food to hungry children. Will Hauser and Lauren Walters launched the company in 2011, and it went out of business in 2017.

== History ==
Will Hauser and Lauren Walters founded Two Degrees Food in 2010 and launched in early 2011. Hauser and Walters picked the name Two Degrees to emphasize the idea that only two degrees of separation exist between consumers to a hungry child. In 2011, Two Degrees Food was recognized as a runner up in the Katerva Awards for Food Security.

Two Degrees went out of business on February 1, 2017.

== Product and mission ==
Two Degrees Food produced a line of all-natural, gluten-free, vegan and GMO-free nutrition bars in several flavors to appeal to a wider audience. These products were Apple Pecan, Cherry Almond, Chocolate Banana, and Chocolate Peanut. The recipes were developed by Barr Hogen.

The meals were locally sourced, and the company partnered with global non-profits and NGOs in order to fulfill this mission.

One of their main ways to promote their business was using some of their profit to give food to hungry children. Two Degrees Food has provided meals to children in areas including the United States, Kenya, India, Malawi, Somalia, Colombia, and Myanmar.
