= Blake Mycoskie =

American businessman, entrepreneur, author and philanthropist

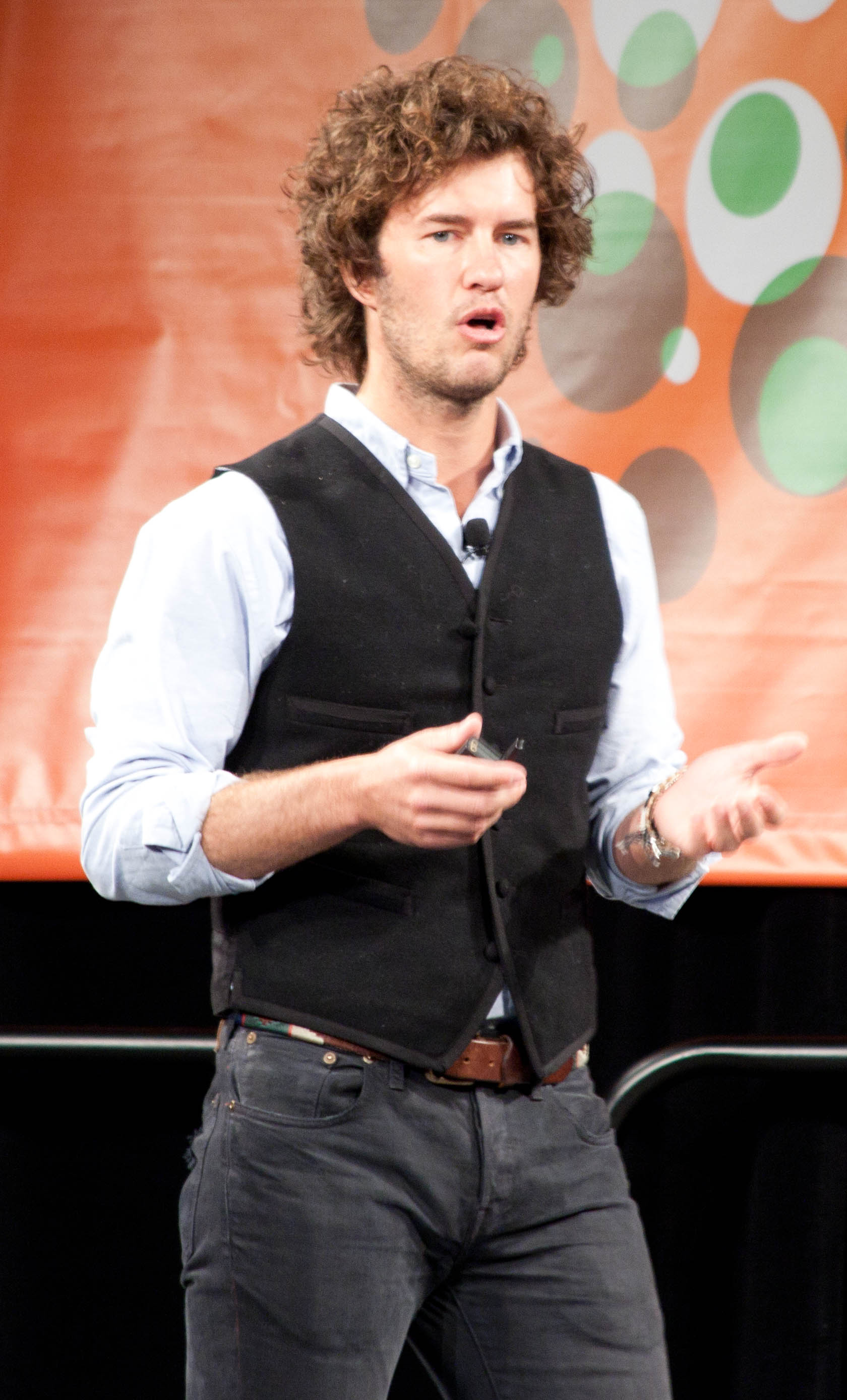
- Mycoskie speaks at SXSW 2011
- Born: August 26, 1976 (age 50); Arlington, Texas, US
- Education: Southern Methodist University (dropped out)
- Occupation: Entrepreneur
- Organization: Toms Shoes
- Notable work: Start Something That Matters
- Television: The Amazing Race 2
- Spouses: Heather Lang (m. 2012; div. 2020); Molly Holm (m. 2023; div. 2025)
- Children: 2
- Relatives: Paige Mycoskie (sister)

Blake Mycoskie (born August 26, 1976) is an American entrepreneur, author, and philanthropist. He is the founder of Toms Shoes and co-founder of Madefor.

== Early life and education ==
Mycoskie was born in Arlington, Texas, to Mike Mycoskie, an orthopaedic surgeon, and Pam Mycoskie, an author. After first attending Arlington Martin High School, he graduated from St. Stephen's Episcopal School in Austin in 1995. Mycoskie, who began playing tennis when he was 10, attended Southern Methodist University on a partial tennis scholarship in 1995, and elected a dual major in philosophy and business. After an Achilles tendon injury he sustained as a sophomore, which effectively ended his tennis career, Mycoskie left SMU and launched his first business, EZ Laundry. Originally focused on SMU, which had no on-campus dry cleaning service, EZ Laundry expanded, ultimately employing more than 40 people, servicing three universities, and generating approximately $1 million in sales. Mycoskie sold the company to his partner in 1999.

== Career ==
After college, Mycoskie moved to Nashville and founded Mycoskie Media, an outdoor billboard company that focused mainly on marketing country music. The company was quickly profitable, and was bought by Clear Channel nine months after its launch.

In 2001, Mycoskie and his sister, Paige Mycoskie, applied for the cast of Survivor. A member of the Survivor production team told them about The Amazing Race, which had yet to debut, and they instead pursued a team position on that show. They competed in the second season of The Amazing Race and finished in third place, missing a million dollar prize by four minutes. Mycoskie moved to Los Angeles later that year.

In Los Angeles, Mycoskie co-founded the cable network Reality Central with Larry Namer, a founder of E! Entertainment Television. Raising $25 million from venture capitalists, along with other members of reality show casts, the network launched in 2003 with a plan of airing original content and re-runs of reality programming. Although the network had moderate success, it folded in 2005 after Rupert Murdoch launched the Fox Reality Channel and outbid Reality Central for advertisers and programming. Determined to pursue an entrepreneurial path, Mycoskie then partnered with the founders of TrafficSchool.com to create DriversEd Direct, an online driver's education service which additionally offered behind-the-wheel training in hybrid and sport utility vehicles. To promote DriversEdDirect, he created Closer Marketing Group, a Santa Monica-based marketing firm specializing in brand development and viral marketing.

Mycoskie visited Argentina on vacation in 2006. While there, he met an American woman who was part of a volunteer organization that provided shoes for children in need. Mycoskie spent several days traveling from village to village with the group, as well as on his own. "[I witnessed] the intense pockets of poverty just outside the bustling capital", he wrote in a 2011 article for Business Insider. "It dramatically heightened my awareness. Yes, I knew somewhere in the back of my mind that poor children around the world often went barefoot, but now, for the first time, I saw the real effects of being shoeless: the blisters, the sores, the infections."

Inspired, Mycoskie returned to the United States and founded Shoes for Better Tomorrows. Designed as a for-profit business that could give new shoes to disadvantaged children, the company would donate a new pair of shoes for every pair of shoes sold. An early example of social entrepreneurship, the shoes, similar to the Argentinian Alpargata, were created to appeal to a worldwide audience, which would both sustain the company's mission and generate profit. Shoes for a Better Tomorrow, later shortened to Toms, was started in 2006; by 2013, the company had donated more than 100,000,000 pairs of shoes to people in need. The shoes are sold globally in more than 1000 stores.

In 2011, Toms expanded to include eyeglasses in its "one for one" offering—for every pair of sunglasses purchased, sight-saving medical treatment, prescription glasses, or surgery is donated to a person in need. While Mycoskie conceived the idea, a "Sight Giving Partner", the Seva Foundation, was contracted to administer the actual program, which launched in Nepal, Tibet, and Cambodia. In a 2012 interview with Fast Company, Mycoskie said it was helpful for him to work with Seva. "I've been there when (people have had) surgery ... and I've handed out the glasses. But as Toms grows, it has to be less about 'What's Blake's most intimate, joyful experience?' and more about 'What's the great need?'"

Mycoskie published the book Start Something That Matters in 2011. In it, he wrote about the virtues of social entrepreneurship and the concept of businesses using their profits and company assets to make charitable donations or engage in other charitable efforts, using his experience with Toms to demonstrate both the intangible and real returns. For every copy of Start Something That Matters sold, Mycoskie promised to give a children's book to a child in need. Fifty percent of royalties from the book were then used to provide grants to up-and-coming entrepreneurs, and Mycoskie increased this to 100% in late 2012. The book became a New York Times best-selling business book, and a number one New York Times best-seller in the advice category.

At SXSW in 2014, Mycoskie announced the launch of Toms Roasting Co., a company which offers coffee sourced through direct trade efforts in Rwanda, Honduras, Peru, Guatemala, and Malawi. Toms Roasting Co. will donate a week of water to people in need in supplier countries for every bag of coffee sold. In 2014, Mycoskie announced that Toms would launch an additional "one for one" product every year.

In August 2014, Mycoskie sold 50% of Toms to Bain Capital, retaining his role as Chief Shoe Giver. In a company press release, he said: "In eight short years, we've had incredible success, and now we need a strategic partner who shares our bold vision for the future and can help us realize it." He will donate 50% of the profits from the sale to establish a fund that identifies and supports social entrepreneurship and other causes. Bain committed to matching Mycoskie's donation to the fund, and will continue the one for one business model.

Mycoskie, with Pat Dossett, launched a wellness program called Madefor in March 2020. It is a subscription-based program that helps users adopt sustainable habits of body and mind; and develops lifestyle changes through practice-oriented monthly kit service. The kits are based on different scientific topics, and contain the literature along with a physical tool to monitor progress of the users' shift in behavior and mindset.

Following his departure from TOMS and subsequent public discussion of his experiences with depression and burnout, Mycoskie launched ENOUGH in January 2026, a consumer brand and nonprofit initiative focused on mental health awareness and self-worth.

ENOUGH is operated by We Are Enough LLC and is wholly owned by We Are Enough, a 501(c)(3) nonprofit organization. According to the organization, after-tax profits generated through product sales support the affiliated nonprofit’s mental health initiatives and charitable partners.

The launch of ENOUGH received national media coverage, including profiles in Forbes, People, Women’s Wear Daily, and interviews with CBS News and KTLA. The initiative represented Mycoskie’s return to entrepreneurship following the launch of Madefor, with a primary focus on mental health advocacy.

In April 2026, ENOUGH partnered with Aviator Nation to release a limited-edition bracelet ahead of Mental Health Awareness Month.

In 2026, Mycoskie partnered with Lemonada Media to launch No Magic Pill, a podcast exploring mental health, emotional well-being, and purpose through conversations with authors, researchers, entrepreneurs, athletes, and public figures. Guests included Matthew McConaughey, Kevin Love, Michael Pollan, Kristin Neff, Alexi Pappas, Chip Conley, and Kevin Hines.

== The Amazing Race ==
in January 2002, Mycoskie competed on the second season of the CBS adventure reality show The Amazing Race with his younger sister Paige. The two reached the final leg of the race and finished in third place.

=== The Amazing Race 2 finishes ===
- An underlined blue placement with a double-dagger (‡) indicates that Blake and Paige were the last to arrive at a pit stop in a non-elimination leg.
- A green ƒ indicates that Blake and Paige won the Fast Forward.

Roadblocks performed by Blake are bolded

Episode	Leg	Destination(s)	Detour choice (underlined)	Roadblock performance	Placement	Notes
1	1	United States → Brazil	Mountain/Beach	No Roadblock	4th of 11	(Note: Blake & Paige tied with Hope and Norm for 4th place.)
2	2	Brazil	Freak Out/Seek Out	Paige	9th of 10	
3	3	Brazil → South Africa	Dance/Deliver	**Blake**	5th of 9	(Note: Blake & Paige tied with Shola and Doyin for 5th place.)
4	4	South Africa → Namibia	Slide/Stride	**Blake**	4th of 8	
5	5	Namibia → Thailand	Confusion now/Confusion later	**Blake**	4th of 7	
6	6	Thailand	Boat/Beast	**Blake**	3rd of 6	
7	7	Thailand → Hong Kong	Wishing tree/Herbal tea	**Blake**	5th of 6	
8	8	Hong Kong → Australia	Dragon/Lion	**Blake**	5th of 5‡	(Note: Blake completed the roadblock incorrectly and had to redo it.)
8	9	Australia	Cool down/Heat up	Paige	2nd of 5	
9	10	Australia → New Zealand	Used fast forward		1st of 4ƒ	
10	11	New Zealand	Drop/Climb	Paige	2nd of 4	
11	12	New Zealand → United States	Bike/Walk	**Blake**	1st of 3	
11	13	United States	No Detour	**Blake**	3rd of 3	

== Personal life ==
Mycoskie lived in Jackson, Wyoming, before relocating to the San Francisco Bay Area. He married Heather Lang in 2012 and divorced her in 2020; they have one son and one daughter. His second marriage was to Molly Holm in 2023.

Mycoskie also provides financial support to Wubetu Shimelash, a young boy from Ethiopia. He has been Shimelash's financial benefactor, supporting his education.

Mycoskie is an avid golfer, fly fisher, surfer and adventure athlete, who enjoys rock climbing and polo. He is an investor at Urban Golf Performance, and Athletic Brewing Company; and was a participant of the Sexiest Bachelor in America Pageant.

== Awards and honors ==
- Cannes LionHeart Award, 2016
- Harvard T.H. Chan School of Public Health Next Generation Award, April 9, 2015
- USA Today, "Five Best Communicators In The World" 2013
- ISPA Humanitarian Award (2013)
- Fortune "40 Under 40" (2011)
- ABC News Person of the Week (2011)
- Secretary of State's Award of Corporate Excellence (2009)
- Bloomberg Businessweek "America's Most Promising Social Entrepreneurs" (2008)
- People "Heroes Among Us" (2007)
- People's Design Award from the Cooper-Hewitt National Design Museum (2007)
