= Kanku-Breakaways Conservation Park =

Protected area in South Australia

Kanku - Breakaways Conservation Park
- IUCN category III (natural monument or feature)
- Location within South Australia
- Location: South Australia
- Nearest city: Coober Pedy
- Coordinates: 28°50′55″S 134°43′40″E
- Area: 143.23 km^{2} (55.30 sq mi)
- Established: 4 July 2013
- Governing body: Department for Environment and Water; Antakirinja Matu-Yankunytjatjara Aboriginal Corporation; District Council of Coober Pedy
- Website: Official website

The Kanku-Breakaways Conservation Park, formerly known as The Breakaways Reserve or simply The Breakaways, is a protected area in northern South Australia, just off the Stuart Highway 33 km (21 mi) north of Coober Pedy.

== Name and history ==
The park got the name "The Breakaways" because the mesas and low hills appear from a distance as if "broken away" from the higher ground of the escarpment. The site is significant for the Antakirinja Matuntjara Yankunytjatjara People, whose name for the area is Umoona, meaning "long life", a name also given to a species of tree found in the area, known as the mulga tree.

The conservation park was renamed as the Kanku-Breakaways Conservation Park on 19 November 2015.

== Management ==
The Breakaways CP is managed under a co-management agreement by the Department of Environment, Water, and Natural Resources in conjunction with the Antakirinja Matu-Yankunytjatjara Aboriginal Corporation and the District Council of Coober Pedy.

== Climate ==
The semi-arid desert climatic conditions of the park are similar to those of Coober Pedy, with cool nights and very hot days, and summer temperatures can sometimes exceed 45 °C (113 °F).

== Access and tours ==
Access to the main lookout over the site is provided by a 5 km (3.1 mi) dirt road from the sealed Stuart Highway, or alternatively, via the Dog Fence Scenic Tourist Drive Road. A 65.8 km (40.9 mi) circuit can be made by mountain bike from Coober Pedy along the Stuart Highway to the Breakaways, along the dog fence track and returning to Coober Pedy by the Oodnadatta Track.

Tours from Coober Pedy are conducted by several tour operators. Permits for self-guided visits to the area cost A$10 Per Vehicle ($8 Concession) and are available from the Tourist Information Centre in the District Council Office on Hutchinson Street, Coober Pedy.

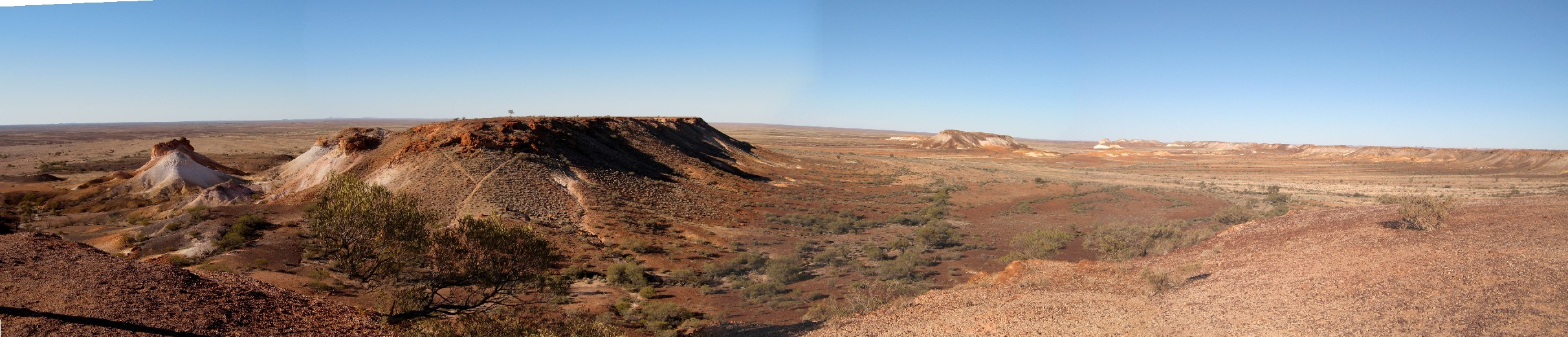
Mesas at the Breakaways Conservation Park
