= Aviator Nation =

Clothing brand

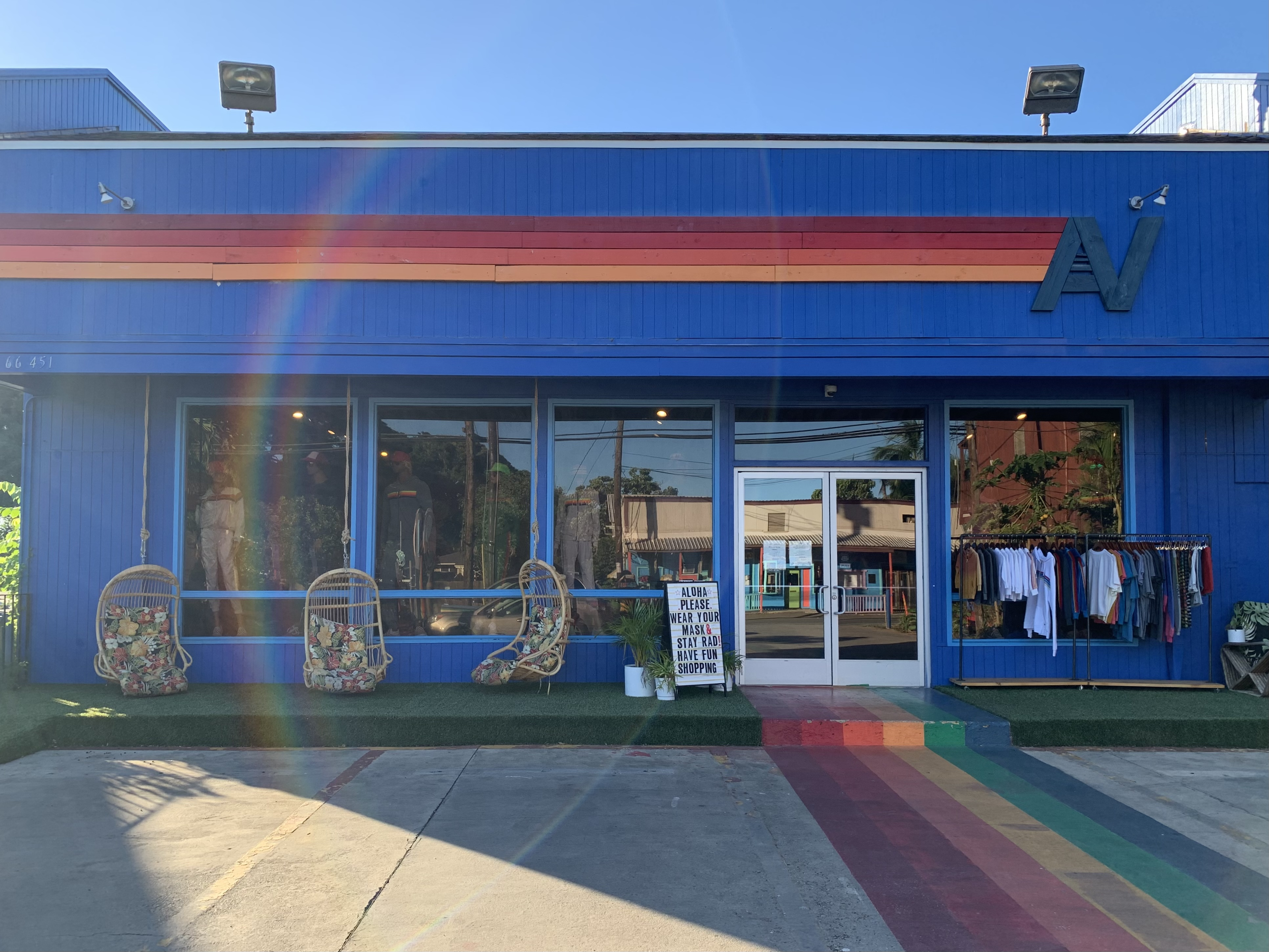
- Aviator Nation storefront in Haleiwa, Hawaii
- Industry: Retail
- Founded: 2006
- Founder: Paige Mycoskie
- Headquarters: Venice, LA, CA, US
- Products: Apparel, accessories, surfboards
- Website: aviatornation.com

Aviator Nation is an American clothing brand founded by Paige Mycoskie in 2006. The line consists of apparel for men, women, and children with most styles unisex, with garments designed to have a worn-in and vintage feel. Garments are advertised as having single needle stitching and hand drawn graphics. The brand carries apparel, accessories, and surfboards. The company is named after Mycoskie's love for aviator-style sunglasses. All products are manufactured in California.

Mycoskie's personal style is that of comfort and color-fused with 70s nostalgia. After failing to find clothes to fit her aesthetic, she began creating garments for herself, out of her home garage in Venice, LA in 2006. Mycoskie sold them at a local street fair, and witnessed the business potential after quickly selling out of every style, specifically her white hoodie, now known as the "signature hoodie," one of the most successful garments for the brand. In 2009, she opened the first retail store in Venice, on Abbot Kinney Blvd. The company has a website, and 15 retail outlets in the US.

Designs favor inks and dye treatments popular in the 1970s, and fabrics are intentionally distressed.

Collections include "Pray for Surf" and "Rock and Roll." Trademark graphics include a surfer, and rainbow stripes stitched in the hood of garments. The rainbow stripe designs stitched across the chest of T-shirts and hoodies in both four and five stripe combinations are also the brand's best sellers. Aviator Nation's prints include drawings from Mycoskie's earliest sketches, and she still hand draws details from lightning bolts to psychedelic maidens

Aviator Nation surfboards debuted in early 2016, shaped and airbrushed by hand.

== Partnerships & Collaborations ==
In 2012, Aviator Nation launched a partnership with Austin City Limits Music Festival (ACL). Mycoskie designed and installed a rainbow tepee for musicians to relax and play vintage instruments, which evolved into impromptu shows. She also designed ACL x Aviator Nation merchandise.

The company has since expanded its co-branded collections for artists such as John Mayer, designing his "Born and Raised" tour merchandise and brands including SoulCycle, Rolling Stone, Gibson Guitar, Honda, FunBoy, SXSW, Celsius, AIM Youth Mental Health, and many more.

The brand is represented at some of the largest music festivals and sporting events through partnerships with Austin City Limits, Lollapalooza Music Festival; SXSW, BottleRock, Jazz Aspen Festival, Malibu Chill Cook Off, Sonoma Harvest Festival, Formula One, The Phoenix Open, The Kentucky Derby and more to be announced.

The company lends its creative designs and volunteers time raising funds for charities supporting a variety of nonprofits including The Boys & Girls Club, City of Hope, Baller Dream Foundation, Invisible Arts Network, Charity Water; Surf Aid; Heal the Bay; The Flatwater Foundation; Global Citizen and AIM Youth Mental Health.

== Recognition ==
In 2013, GQ Magazine named Mycoskie one of the "Best New Menswear Designers in America".She then created a capsule collection for GQ x GAP.
