= Toms Shoes =

Footwear company based in Los Angeles, California

TOMS Shoes, LLC
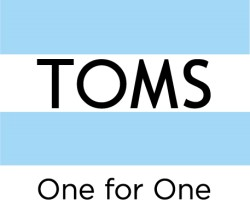

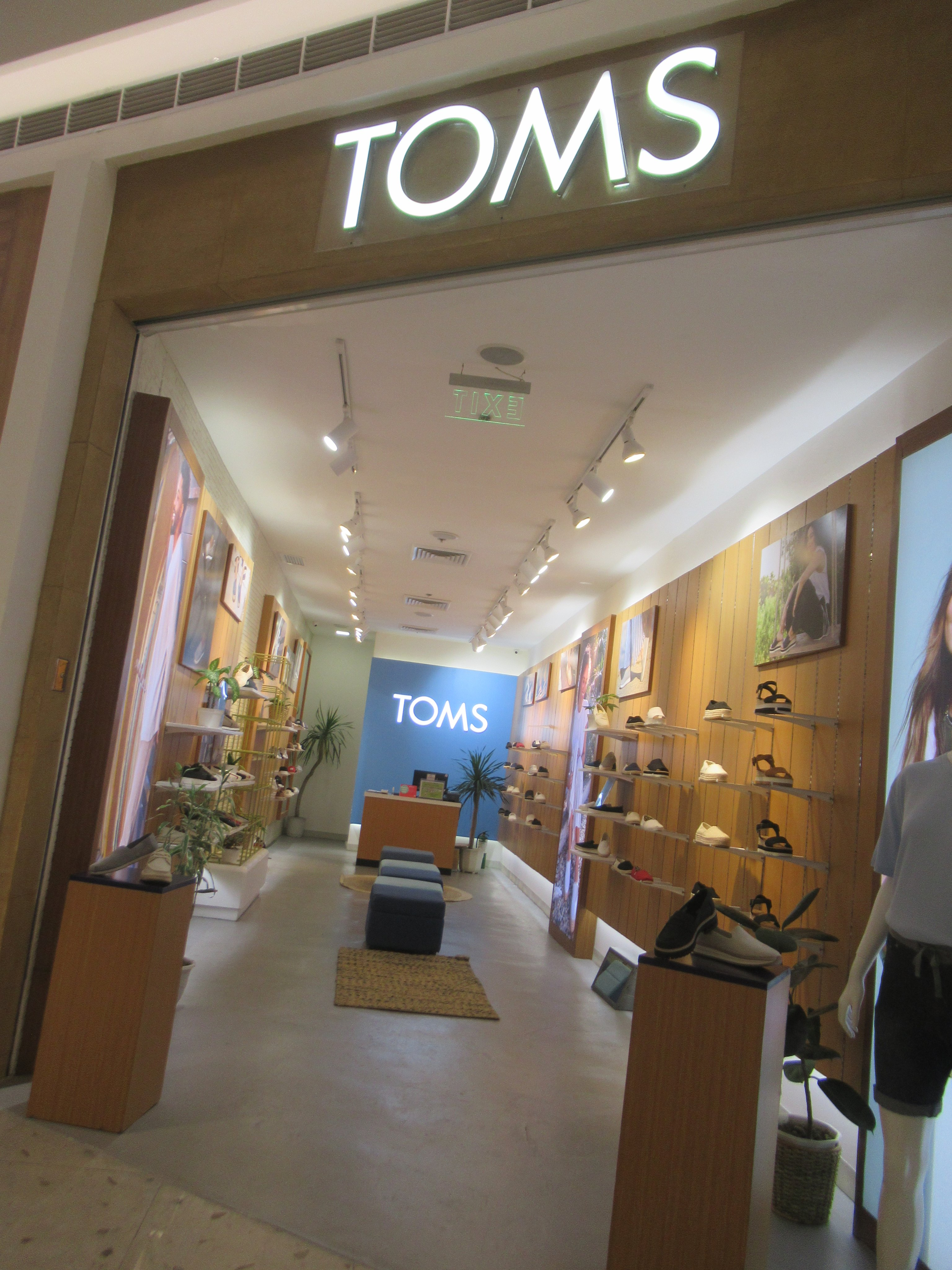
- Philippines
- Type: Private
- Industry: Footwear and accessories
- Founded: 2006
- Founder: Blake Mycoskie
- Headquarters: Los Angeles, California
- Area served: Worldwide
- Products: Shoes, eyewear, coffee and apparel
- Revenue: ▲$392 million (2019)
- Owner: Jefferies Financial Group Inc; Nexus Capital Management LP; Brookfield Asset Management Inc
- Number of employees: 500
- Website: www.toms.com

Toms (stylized as TOMS) is an American for-profit company based in Los Angeles, California. Founded in 2006 by Blake Mycoskie, an entrepreneur from Arlington, Texas, the company designs and markets shoes as well as eyewear, coffee, apparel and handbags.

The company was taken over by its creditors: Jefferies Financial Group Inc, Nexus Capital Management LP, and Brookfield Asset Management Inc in December 2019, and founder Mycoskie ceased to be an owner.

== Company history ==
Blake Mycoskie visited Argentina in 2002 while competing in the second season of The Amazing Race with his sister. He returned on vacation in January 2006, and met a woman who was volunteering to deliver shoes to children. Mycoskie offered to help and has cited the shoe distribution experience, and the many shoeless children he encountered, as the birth of his idea for his eventual company.

He decided to develop a type of alpargata (a simple canvas slip-on shoe that is popular in Argentina) for the North American market, with the goal of providing a new pair of free shoes to youth of Argentina and other developing nations for every pair sold. According to Mycoskie, Bill Gates encouraged him by saying that the lack of shoes was a major contributor to diseases in children.

Upon returning to the U.S., Mycoskie sold the online driver education company that he was running for $500,000 to finance Toms Shoes.

The company name is derived from the word "tomorrow," and evolved from the original concept, "Shoes for Tomorrow Project." Mycoskie initially commissioned Argentine shoe manufacturers to make 250 pairs of shoes. Sales officially began in May 2006. After an article ran in the Los Angeles Times, the company received order requests for nine times the available stock online, and 10,000 pairs were sold in the first year. The first batch of 10,000 free shoes were distributed in October 2006 to Argentine children.

In 2007, the company launched its first annual "One Day Without Shoes" event, which encouraged participants to go shoeless for one day in order to raise awareness about the impact shoes can have on a child's life. The event has had corporate sponsors such as AOL, Flickr, and the Discovery Channel.

In October 2007, Toms Shoes received the People's Design Award, as determined by an online popularity contest by the Cooper-Hewitt, National Design Museum.

By 2011, over 500 retailers carried the brand globally and in the same year, Toms launched its eyewear line. By 2012 over two million pairs of new shoes had been given to children in developing countries around the world. The Daniels Fund Ethics Initiative at the University of New Mexico has described the company as an example of social entrepreneurship.

The company launched TOMS Roasting Co. in 2014, and with each purchase of TOMS Roasting Co. coffee, the company works with other organizations to provide 140 liters of safe water (equal to a one-week supply) to a family in need that lives in a coffee-producing region. In 2015, TOMS Bag Collection was launched to help contribute to advancements in maternal health. Purchases of TOMS Bags help provide training for skilled birth attendants and distribute birth kits containing items that help women practice safe childbirth.

In June 2014, the company announced that Mycoskie was looking to sell part of his stake in the company to help it grow faster and meet its long-term goals. On August 20, 2014 Bain Capital acquired 50% of Toms. Reuters reported that the transaction valued the company at $625 million; Mycoskie's personal wealth following the deal was reported at $300 million. Mycoskie retained 50% ownership of Toms, as well as his role as "Chief Shoe Giver". Mycoskie said he would use half of the proceeds from the sale to start a new fund to support socially minded entrepreneurship, and Bain would match his investment and continue the company's one-for-one policy.

== Business model ==
=== "One for one" ===
Toms' business model is known as the "one for one concept" model, which is referring to the company's promise to deliver a pair of free shoes to a child in need for every sale of their retail product. The countries involved have included Argentina, Ethiopia, Guatemala, Haiti, Mexico, Rwanda, South Africa and the United States. The business has grown beyond producing shoes and has included eyewear and apparel in Toms product lines. The company uses word-of-mouth advocacy for much of its sales, centering its business focus on corporate social responsibility. Part of this model originally involved a non-profit arm called "Friends of Toms" that recruited volunteers to help in the shoe distributions in foreign countries. Toms trademarked the phrase "One for One" to describe its own business model. Toms has received criticism from the international development community who have stated that Toms' model is designed to make consumers feel good rather than addressing the underlying causes of poverty. Criticisms have also included whether or not the shoe donation is as effective as a monetary donation to other charities. Toms responded to this criticism by moving 40% of its supply chain for shoe donation to countries they actively give in. Toms presently manufactures shoes in Kenya, India, Ethiopia and Haiti.

A 2014 paper in the Journal of Development Effectiveness studied the effect of Toms Shoes on local shoe markets, and did not find any statistically significant effect, although analysts and the paper's authors noted the study was limited in scope and time-scale.

More recent papers such as "Shoeing the Children: The Impact of the TOMS Shoe Donation Program in Rural El Salvador" suggest harmful effects and even an economical decline in local production in the target countries. "Looking at cross-country data on used-clothing imports across African countries, he finds that these imports explain roughly 40% of the decline in production in the region and 50% of the decline in employment over the period 1981–2000." The same study about Toms Shoes specifically states psychological and therefore social consequences in El Salvador: "In-kind donations may exhibit negative externalities on the psychology of recipients, unintentionally fostering a sense of dependency on outside donors."

In 2019, Amy Smith, TOMS' Chief Giving Officer, announced in their 2019 Impact Report that the company would no longer be following the "One for One" business model that TOMS pioneered. This was her statement:

"We made the decision to decouple our impact from the One for One model we pioneered, and to expand our giving portfolio to include impact grants. This way, we can support organizations working to address some of today’s most pressing issues."

=== Focuses for Corporate Responsibility ===
Author Daniel H. Pink described the company's business model as "expressly built for purpose maximization", whereby Toms is selling both shoes and its ideal. Toms' consumer market are purchasing shoes and also making a purchase that transforms them into benefactors for the company. Another phrase used to try to describe the business model has been "caring capitalism". Part of how Toms has developed this description is by incorporating the giving into its business model before it made a profit, making it as integral to the business model as its revenue generating aspects. Business tycoon and Virgin Group founder Richard Branson wrote of the company's business model in his book Screw Business as Usual, "They look for communities that will benefit most from Toms based on their economic, health and education needs while taking into account local business so as not to create a correlating negative effect." He also commented on Toms' expansion into eyewear in order to help the nearly 300 million people who are visually impaired in developing nations.

The company's shoe distribution partners have focused on distributing shoes in areas where health and social benefits of the shoes would be the highest. For example, in Ethiopia the shoes are intended to help prevent a soil-borne disease that attacks the lymphatic system and which largely affected women and children. Toms sunglasses are sold with the One for One model, however it does not necessarily provide glasses only to those in developing countries. The One for One model includes putting money toward medical treatment, eye surgeries and prescription glasses. Toms works with the Seva Foundation among other partners to accomplish this. The first countries that Toms implemented its program were Nepal, Cambodia and Tibet. The original three designs, according to Leigh Grogan, were "The stripe on the temples represents the buyer; the stripe on the tips represents the person whose sight is being helped, and the middle stripe represents Toms, which brings the two together."

== Shoe distribution ==
Shoes have been given to children in 70 countries worldwide, including the United States, Argentina, Ethiopia, Rwanda, Eswatini, Guatemala, Haiti and South Africa. Toms are sold at more than 500 stores internationally, including Neiman Marcus, Nordstrom, and Whole Foods Market, which include shoes made from recycled materials.

A story by LA Weekly priced the manufacturing cost of a pair of Toms Shoes at $3.50–$5.00 in U.S. dollars, and noted that the children's shoes given out by the company were among the cheapest to make, which is not necessarily apparent to consumers. According to garment-industry author Kelsey Timmerman, many people he spoke to in Ethiopia were critical of the company, saying that they felt it exploited the idea of Ethiopian poverty as a marketing tool. An Argentina-based shoemaker agreed, saying that the imagery used by the company was manipulative.

Employees of Toms travel to different countries on "Giving Trips" to deliver shoes to children in person. In 2006, Toms distributed 10,000 pairs of shoes in Argentina. In November 2007, the company distributed 50,000 pairs of shoes to children in South Africa. As of April 2009, Toms had distributed 140,000 pairs of shoes to children in Argentina, Ethiopia, South Africa as well as children in the United States. As of 2012, Toms has given away over one million pairs of shoes in 40 countries.

=== Campus clubs ===
Students attending colleges across the United States have created TOMS campus clubs. As of March 20, 2014, 281 campus clubs existed in the United States with another dozen located in Canada. By comparison, another nonprofit organization known as Lions Club International was established in 1917 and is known for working to end the cause of blindness, reports 400 Lions’ campus clubs in 42 countries.

== Philanthropy ==
=== Partnerships ===
In 2009 Toms partnered with the Charlize Theron Africa Outreach Project to create limited edition shoes, and used profits to benefit education and medical support in remote areas of Africa suffering from AIDS outbreaks. Toms has also produced shoes with a handlebar mustache symbol in place of the traditional Toms symbol in support of the Movember Foundation. Toms is a supporter of the charity charity: water, with which it has partnered with for several years, including its WaterForward project, which aims to bring clean water to underdeveloped countries. An additional partner charity is FEED, a charity where a consumer will purchase a pair of shoes and the company will donate twelve meals to impoverished schools in addition to a pair of shoes for impoverished children.

The major mission of Toms is that a business, rather than a charity, would help their impact last longer. In his speech at the Second Annual Clinton Global Initiative Mycoskie states that his initial motivation was a disease called podoconiosis—a debilitating and disfiguring disease which causes one's feet to swell along with many other health implications. Also known as "Mossy Foot", podoconiosis is a form of elephantiasis that affects the lymphatic system of the lower legs. The disease is a soil-transmitted disease caused by walking in silica-rich soil. Toms currently works with factories nearby where they perform some of their shoe drops.

=== Influence ===
The Tom's 'One for One' model has inspired many different companies to adopt similar concepts. Warby Parker, launched in 2010, donates a pair of glasses to someone in need for every pair of glasses it sells. The social business Ruby Cup uses a 'Buy One Give One' model for their menstrual cup venture, benefiting women in Kenya. A Bristol chiropractic center influenced by Mycoskie's Start Something That Matters book started donating £1 to Cherish Uganda for every appointment attended. citizenAID North America launched in 2018, donates life-saving training to US teachers and educators.

=== Focus on the Family ===
In July 2011, Toms founder Blake Mycoskie participated in an event sponsored by the group Focus on the Family. After being criticized for supporting a socially conservative non-profit, Mycoskie posted an apology on his website stating that he and his handlers had not heard of Focus on the Family before participating in the event and decided it was a mistake. He also stated that he and the company support equal human and civil rights.
