= One for one =

Philanthropic business model

One for one (also known as "buy-one give-one") is a social entrepreneurship business model reputedly developed by Blake Mycoskie of TOMS Shoes, in which one needed item is given away for each item purchased.

== History ==
The One for One business model is largely credited to TOMS Shoes. Founded by Blake Mycoskie in 2006, TOMS Shoes donates one pair of shoes to a child in a developing country for each pair sold to consumers. Based on the success of TOMS Shoes, other companies began following the business model. Warby Parker began donating eyeglasses to people in need while companies like Soapbox Soaps and Two Degrees Food employ the model to help with poor hygiene and hunger.

In 2019, TOMS switched from a one for one business model and began donating $1 for every $3 it earned.

== Concept ==
The One for One model is a viable way to create commercial and social value. A study conducted by Stanford Social Innovation Review stated that trends in consumer behavior that put high values on social issues are a way for companies to leverage their competencies for a social cause. It also showed that market saturation and adoption by larger companies make it more difficult for consumers to differentiate between competing companies and also cause them to question the authenticity of the concept. It was also criticized by Fast Company as only being a band-aid in addressing social change and that companies use it as "selling ego boosts disguised as social change."
