= Submissions for the Academy Award for Best Documentary Feature =

This is a list of shortlisted finalists for the Academy Award for Best Documentary Feature Film. The Academy of Motion Picture Arts and Sciences (AMPAS) Documentary branch has used it as a preliminary round, before the final five nominated films are announced in mid-January.

== History ==
While the Academy did not begin preparing formal "short-lists" until the 1990s, during select years in the 1980s, The Academy rewarded "Certificates of Special Merit" to documentaries that had been considered by the Academy's Documentary Screening Committee and had come close to a nomination, but failed to make it as the final five.

Starting in 1995, the Academy's Documentary reviewing committee (prior to the creation of the documentary branch) initiated a process by a semi final list of eligible documentary films would be reviewed and voted upon by bi-costal committees, prior to the selection of the final five nominees. The number of shortlisted films changed between the years, with 15 films making the shortlists in 1997, 17 in 1998, 12 in 1999, and an unknown number in 1995 and 1996. Initially, the shortlists were not publicly announced, although inclusions and snubs were reported upon.

Since 1999, the shortlists have usually been announced publicly alongside other categories shortlists in mid-December.

The movement came after several controversies in the 1980s and 90s, such as the omission of critically acclaimed and popular favorites: Shoah (1985), The Thin Blue Line (1988), Roger & Me (1989), Paris Is Burning (1990), Hoop Dreams (1994) and Crumb (1995). The process also allows more voters to participate in the nomination second phase.

Even though the shortlisting process has been well established for nearly three decades, various other acclaimed documentaries have not been nominated: Fahrenheit 9/11 (2004), Grizzly Man (2005), Red Army (2014), Jane (2017), They Shall Not Grow Old (2018) and Apollo 11 (2019).

== List of selected films and years ==
=== 1982 ===
Film	Director(s)	Countrie(s)	Subject(s)	Result	Ref.
After the Axe	Sturla Gunnarsson	Canada	Docu-drama about corporate downsizing and the personal toll of being fired, following an executive whose career and family life unravel after termination.	Nominated	
Becoming American: The Odyssey of a Refugee	Ken Levine and Ivory Waterworth Levine	United States	Follows a Laotian refugee family’s journey from a Thai refugee camp to resettlement in the United States and the challenges of cultural adjustment.	Not nominated	
Ben's Mill	Michel Chalufour and John Karol	United States	Portrait of a water-powered woodworking mill in rural Vermont and the craft traditions surrounding its community.	Nominated	
Fire on the Water	Robert Hillmann	United States	Examines conflict on the Texas Gulf Coast as Vietnamese refugee shrimpers and local fishermen clash amid racial tension and intimidation.	Not nominated	
In Our Water	Meg Switzgable	United States	A New Jersey family discovers its well water is contaminated by a nearby landfill and fights for government accountability.	Nominated	
Just Another Missing Kid	John Zaritsky	Canada	Investigates a child kidnapping case and the frantic search and media/police response surrounding it.	Won Academy Award	
The Kid Who Couldn't Miss	Paul Cowan	Canada	Docudrama that questions the wartime record and celebrated legend of Canadian WWI ace Billy Bishop.	Not nominated	
A Portrait of Giselle	Muriel Balash	United States Canada	Documentary about the ballet Giselle, featuring notable dancers and the role’s performance history.	Nominated	
Vietnam Requiem	Bill Couturié and Jonas McCord	United States	Examines post-traumatic stress disorder among Vietnam War veterans, including interviews with former soldiers incarcerated after returning home.	Not nominated	

=== 1984 ===
Film	Director(s)	Countrie(s)	Subject(s)	Result	Ref.
Abortion: Stories From North and South	Gail Singer	United States	Examines abortion access and personal experiences of women in both developed and developing countries.	Not nominated	
Erika: Not in Vain, Once Upon a Time	Barry J. Spinello	United States	A moving portrait of courage and everyday heroism, Tells the story of a family's struggle to deal with the consequences of their four-year-old daughter's terrible accident and her subsequent dependence on medical life-support systems.	Not nominated	
The Good Fights: The Abraham Lincoln Brigade in the Spanish Civil War	Noel Buckner and Mary Dore	United States	Chronicles American volunteers of the Abraham Lincoln Brigade who fought against fascism in the Spanish Civil War.	Not nominated	
High Schools	Charles Guggenheim	United States	Explores the state of American public high schools and the social pressures facing students.	Nominated	
Hopi: Song of the Fourth World	Pat Ferrero	United States	Examines the culture and political struggles of the Hopi people, including land disputes in Arizona.	Not nominated	
In the Name of the People	Frank Christopher	United States	The film follows four filmmakers who secretly entered El Salvador, marched with guerrillas across the country, and followed them into combat against government forces in San Salvador.	Nominated	
Marlene	Maximilian Schell	West Germany	Documentary portrait of actress and singer Marlene Dietrich.	Nominated	
Nicaragua: No Pasaran	David Bradbury	Australia	Examines the political situation in Nicaragua during the Sandinista era.	Not nominated	
One Man’s Fight For Life	Michael M. Scott	United States	Every year 130,000 Americans are diagnosed as having lung cancer. The program dealt with the case of Said Ullah, a 35-year-old Pakistani immigrant who was told of his fatal illness in 1982 .	Not nominated	
Raoul Wallenberg: Buried Alive	David Harel	United States	Investigates the disappearance and fate of diplomat Raoul Wallenberg.	Not nominated	
Strategic Thrust: The Making of Nuclear-Free Palau	James Heddle	United States	Documents the movement to make Palau nuclear-free amid U.S. strategic interests in the Pacific.	Not nominated	
Streetwise	Martin Bell	United States	Follows homeless and runaway youth surviving on the streets of Seattle.	Nominated	
The Times of Harvey Milk	Rob Epstein	United States	Chronicles the life and assassination of San Francisco politician Harvey Milk.	Won Academy Award	
Tosca's Kiss	Daniel Schmid	Switzerland	Portrait of retired opera singers living at Casa Verdi in Milan.	Not nominated	

=== 1988 ===
Film	Director(s)	Countrie(s)	Subject(s)	Result	Ref.
Lodz Ghetto	Kathryn Taverna and Alan Adelson	United States	The segregation of the Jewish population at Łódź Ghetto during WWII	Not nominated	

=== 1996 ===
Film	Director(s)	Countrie(s)	Subject(s)	Result	Ref.
The Line King: The Al Hirschfeld Story	Susan Warms Dryfoos	United States	Documentary portrait of caricaturist and illustrator Al Hirschfeld.	Nominated	
Mandela	Angus Gibson and Jo Menell	South Africa United States	Official film biography of Nelson Mandela and his struggle against apartheid.	Nominated	
My Knees Were Jumping: Remembering the Kindertransports	Melissa Hacker	United States	Survivor accounts of the Kindertransport rescue of Jewish children from Nazi-occupied Europe.	Not nominated	
Suzanne Farrell: Elusive Muse	Anne Belle and Deborah Dickson	United States	Documentary portrait of ballerina Suzanne Farrell and her career (including her relationship with choreographer George Balanchine).	Nominated	
Tell the Truth and Run: George Seldes and the American Press	Rick Goldsmith	United States	Profile of journalist and media critic George Seldes and press freedom in the United States.	Nominated	
Trinkets and Beads	Christopher Walker	United States	About the Huaorani people of Ecuador and the impact of missionaries and oil development on their lives.	Not nominated	
When We Were Kings	Leon Gast	United States	Chronicles the 1974 Ali–Foreman heavyweight championship boxing match in Zaire.	Won Academy Award	

=== 1997 ===
Film	Director(s)	Countrie(s)	Subject(s)	Result	Ref.
Ayn Rand: A Sense of Life	Michael Paxton	United States	Biographical documentary on writer and philosopher Ayn Rand.	Nominated	
Colors Straight Up	Michèle Ohayon	United States	Chronicles an experimental arts-in-education program working with at-risk youth in New York City.	Nominated	
4 Little Girls	Spike Lee	United States	Tells the story of the 1963 bombing of the 16th Street Baptist Church in Birmingham, Alabama, which killed four African American girls.	Nominated	
A Life Apart: Hasidism in America	Oren Rudavsky and Menachem Daum	United States	Documentary about the Hasidic Jewish community and culture in the United States.	Not nominated	
The Long Way Home	Mark Jonathan Harris	United States	Explores the plight of Jewish refugees in Europe after World War II and the creation of the State of Israel.	Won	
Waco: The Rules of Engagement	William Gazecki	United States	Investigates the 1993 siege of the Branch Davidian compound near Waco, Texas.	Nominated	

=== 1998 ===
Film	Director(s)	Countrie(s)	Subject(s)	Result	Ref.
Dying to Tell the Story	Greg MacGillivray and David Breashears	United States	Follows narrator Amy Eldon on a personal journey to find meaning in the death of her older brother, 22-year-old Reuters photographer Dan Eldon. Dan was among a group of five journalists attacked by a mob during the Somali famine in Somalia in 1993; he and three others were stoned to death.	Not nominated	
Everest	Greg MacGillivray and David Breashears	United States	The film follows includes a description of the training required in order to climb the 29,031 feet to the summit of Mount Everest and the challenges faced during the ascent, such as avalanches, blizzards, and oxygen deprivation	Not nominated	
The Farm: Angola, USA	Liz Garbus, Wilbert Rideau and Jonathan Stack	United States	Set in the notorious and largest American maximum-security prison, Louisiana State Penitentiary, known as Angola.	Nominated	
Frank Lloyd Wright	Ken Burns	United States	Explores the life of architect Frank Lloyd Wright	Not nominated	
The Human Race aka Rock the Boat	Robert Houston	United States	In an epic adventure on the high seas, a crew of HIV+ sailors enter the Trans-Pacific Yacht Race from California to Hawaii.	Not nominated	
The Last Days	James Moll	United States	The film tells the stories of five Hungarian Jews during the Holocaust, focusing on the last year of World War II, when Nazi Germany occupied Hungary and began mass deportations of Jews in the country to concentration and extermination camps, primarily Auschwitz. It depicts the horrors of life in the camps, but also stresses the optimism and perseverance of the survivors.	Won Academy Award	
Lenny Bruce: Swear to Tell the Truth	Robert B. Weide	United States	Explores the life of the controversial comedian Lenny Bruce	Nominated	
Regret to Inform	Barbara Sonneborn	United States	Features filmmaker Barbara Sonneborn as she goes to the Vietnamese countryside where her husband was killed. Her translator is a fellow war widow named Xuan Ngoc Nguyen and together, the two women try to understand their losses. The film includes interviews with Vietnamese and American widows.	Nominated	
Return with Honor	Freida Lee Mock and Terry Sanders	United States	Focuses on about U.S. prisoners of war during the Vietnam War.	Not nominated	
Wallowitch & Ross: This Moment	Richard Morris	United States	The film follows acclaimed composer and cabaret performer John Wallowitch and partner Bertram Ross, Martha Graham's lead dancer and co-director of the Graham Company.	Not nominated	

=== 1999 ===
Film	Director(s)	Countrie(s)	Subject(s)	Result	Ref.
Amargosa	Todd Robinson	United States	Marta Becket and the Amargosa Opera House and Hotel	Not nominated	
American Movie	Chris Smith	United States	The making of a low budget horror movie in Wisconsin	Not nominated	
Beyond the Mat	Barry W. Blaustein	United States	The lives of professional wrestlers outside of the ring, primarily Mick Foley, Terry Funk, and Jake Roberts, as well as some aspiring wrestlers	Not nominated	
Buena Vista Social Club	Wim Wenders	Cuba; France; Germany; United Kingdom; United States	Follows the contemporary history of Cuban music, featuring the musicians who recorded the 1997 acclaimed album Buena Vista Social Club	Nominated	
Genghis Blues	Roko Belic	United States	Paul Pena and the art of Tuvan throat singing	Nominated	
Mr. Death: The Rise and Fall of Fred A. Leuchter, Jr.	Errol Morris	United States	Fred A. Leuchter Jr., capital punishment and Holocaust denial	Not nominated	
On the Ropes	Brett Morgen and Nanette Burstein	United States	Three young boxers and their coach	Nominated	
One Day in September	Kevin Macdonald	United Kingdom	Terrorist attacks at the 1972 Summer Olympics	Won Academy Award	
Pop & Me	Chris Roe	United States	The director's travels around with his own father, interviewing fathers and sons about their own father-son relationships	Not nominated	
Smoke and Mirrors: A History of Denial	Torrie Rosenzweig	United States	Tobacco in the United States	Not nominated	
The Source	Chuck Workman	United States	The Beat Generation and their impact on literary and popular culture	Not nominated	
Speaking in Strings	Paola di Florio	United States	Italian-born violinist Nadja Salerno-Sonnenberg	Nominated	

=== 2000 ===
Film	Director(s)	Countrie(s)	Subject(s)	Result	Ref.
Coming to Light: Edward S. Curtis and the North American Indians	Anne Makepeace	United States	An in-depth portrait of Edward S. Curtis (1868-1952), the preeminent pioneer photographer of Native American Indians. The film tells the dramatic story of Curtis' life, his monumental work, and his changing views of the people he set out to document. Includes Native Americans in the discussions of his images.	Not nominated	
A Fight to the Finish: Stories of Polio	Ken Mandel	United States	Chronicles the story of America's battle against the last of the deadly childhood plagues, polio.	Not nominated	
Half Past Autumn: The Life and Works of Gordon Parks	Craig Laurence Rice	United States	An intimate look at the life and career of Gordon Parks a true Renaissance man who has excelled as a photographer, novelist, journalist, poet, musician and filmmaker.	Not nominated	
Into the Arms of Strangers: Stories of the Kindertransport	Mark Jonathan Harris	United States	Follows the British rescue operation known as the Kindertransport, which saved the lives of over 9,000 Jewish and other children from Nazi Germany, Austria, Czechoslovakia, and Danzig by transporting them via train, boat, and plane to Great Britain	Won Academy Award	
Legacy	Tod Lending	United States	The film tracks three different generations (over five years) of a family in Chicago that lives in the Henry Horner Homes public housing. Their lives change, however, after a life-altering event - the murder of a family member - slowly changes them to have a more positive outlook on life.	Nominated	
Light Keeps Me Company	Carl-Gustav Nykvist	Sweden	Carl-Gustaf Nykvist's documentary about his father, Sven Nykvist. The film is based on Sven's memoirs with Sven himself as narrator. A journey to the place of birth, Moheda, constitutes the hub of the film and during the journey friends and memories emerge.	Not nominated	
Living Dolls: The Making of a Child Beauty Queen	Shari Cookson	United States	The documentary follows five-year-old beauty contestant Swan Brooner and her mother, Robin Browne throughout the year of 1999 as Brooner moves from a pageant in Cape Coral, Florida to the higher profile southern pageants.	Not nominated	
Long Night's Journey into Day	Deborah Hoffmann and Frances Reid	United States	Follows the Truth and Reconciliation Commission in post-Apartheid South Africa.	Nominated	
Of Civil Wrongs & Rights: The Fred Korematsu Story	Eric Paul Fornier	United States	Follows the 40-year legal fight of Fred Korematsu, against the forced Internment of Japanese Americans	Not nominated	
Scottsboro: An American Tragedy	Daniel Anker and Barak Goodman	United States	Follows one of the longest-running and most controversial courtroom pursuits of racism in American history, which led to nine black teenaged men being wrongly convicted of raping a white woman in Alabama	Nominated	
Soldiers in the Army of God	Marc Levin and Daphne Pinkerson	United States	Between 1973 and 2000, the USA witnessed over 2400 physical attacks on doctors, resulting in 7 murders and the destruction of more than 150 clinics. The documentary sheds light on the US Christian terrorist organization, the Army of God.	Not nominated	
Sound and Fury	Josh Aronson	United States	Follows two American families with young deaf children and their conflict over whether or not to give their children cochlear implants; surgically implanted devices that may improve their ability to hear but may threaten their Deaf identity.	Nominated	

=== 2001 ===
Film	Director(s)	Countrie(s)	Subject(s)	Result	Ref.
Children Underground	Edet Belzberg	United States	Follows homeless and runaway children living in the streets, underground passages, and sewers of Bucharest, Romania.	Nominated	
Murder on a Sunday Morning	Jean-Xavier de Lestrade	France	Investigates the murder trial of a teenager accused in the killing of a British tourist in Florida, examining policing and the U.S. justice system.	Won Academy Award	
My Khmer Heart	Janine Hosking	Australia	Follows an Australian woman’s efforts to run and protect an orphanage in Cambodia amid shifting political pressures.	Not nominated	
LaLee's Kin: The Legacy of Cotton	Deborah Dickson, Susan Froemke and Albert Maysles	United States	Portrait of LaLee Wallace and a Mississippi Delta school district, linking poverty and education to the long legacy of slavery and sharecropping.	Nominated	
Promises	Carlos Bolado, B. Z. Goldberg and Justine Shapiro	United States	Brings together Israeli and Palestinian children (and their families) to explore how conflict shapes their lives and perceptions.	Nominated	
War Photographer	Christian Frei	Switzerland	Follows war photographer James Nachtwey as he documents conflict zones and humanitarian crises.	Nominated	

=== 2002 ===
Film	Director(s)	Countrie(s)	Subject(s)	Result	Ref.
Bowling for Columbine	Michael Moore	United States	The documentary film explores what Moore suggests are the primary causes for the Columbine High School massacre in 1999 and other acts of gun violence. He focuses on the background and environment in which the massacre took place and some common public opinions and assumptions about related issues. The film also looks into the nature of violence in the United States, and American violence abroad.	Won Academy Award	
Daughter from Danang	Gail Dolgin and Vicente Franco	United States	Focuses on an Amerasian, Heidi Bub, meeting her biological family in Da Nang, decades after being brought to the United States in 1975 during Operation Babylift at the end of the Vietnam War	Nominated	
The Kid Stays in the Picture	Nanette Burstein and Brett Morgen	United States	Biography of New Hollywood film producer Robert Evans	Not nominated	
The Last Dance	Mirra Bank	United States	Explores the collaboration between Pilobolus Dance Company and Maurice Sendak, who together created a dance-theater piece about the Holocaust	Not nominated	
Lost in La Mancha	Keith Fulton and Louis Pepe	United States	Follows Terry Gilliam's first attempt to make The Man Who Killed Don Quixote, a film adaptation of the 1605/1615 novel Don Quixote by Miguel de Cervantes. The documentary was shot in 2000 during pre-production and filming and it was intended as a "making-of" documentary for the film. However, Gilliam's failure to complete his film resulted in the documentary filmmakers retitling their work as Lost in la Mancha and releasing it independently.	Not nominated	
OT: Our Town	Scott Hamilton Kennedy	United States	Documentary set at Dominguez High School in Compton, California. The school has not produced a play in twenty years and has no budget, nor a stage. The film documents the efforts by two teachers and twenty-four students to adapt and update Thornton Wilder's 1938 American classic Our Town, set in an all-white small town between the years 1901 and 1913, to better reflect the ethnic background of Dominguez High School and Compton in the year 2000. The film documents rehearsals and the self-doubts experienced leading up to the performance on June 8–10, 2000 in the school's cafeteria.	Not nominated	
Prisoner of Paradise	Malcolm Clarke and Stuart Sender	United States United Kingdom Canada	Tells the true story of Kurt Gerron, a German-Jewish cabaret and film actor and director in the 1920s and 1930s who was deported to the Theresienstadt concentration camp in Czechoslovakia during World War II. There, Gerron was ordered to write and direct a Nazi propaganda film, Theresienstadt. Ein Dokumentarfilm aus dem jüdischen Siedlungsgebiet, before being deported to Auschwitz concentration camp, where he and his wife Olga were murdered on 30 October 1944.	Nominated	
Spellbound	Jeffrey Blitz	United States	The film follows eight competitors in the 1999 Scripps National Spelling Bee	Nominated	
Stevie	Steve James	United States	Focuses on James' relationship Stevie Fielding, a troubled young boy to whom James had been an 'Advocate Big Brother'.	Not nominated	
Two Towns of Jasper	Whitney Dow and Marco Williams	United States	Eade with two segregated film crews, one black and one white, Two Towns of Jasper looks at a small Texas town in the wake of the brutal dragging murder of James Byrd Jr.	Not nominated	
Winged Migration	Jacques Perrin, Jacques Cluzaud and Michel Debats	France Italy Switzerland Germany	Showcases the immense journeys routinely made by birds during their migrations.	Nominated	

=== 2003 ===
Film	Director(s)	Countrie(s)	Subject(s)	Result	Ref.
The Agronomist	Jonathan Demme	United States	Jean Dominique and Radio Haiti-Inter, the country's first independent radio station	Not nominated	
Balseros	Carles Bosch and Josep M. Domenech	Spain	Balseros emigrating from Cuba during the Período especial and the 1994 Cuban rafter crisis	Nominated	
Bus 174	Jose Padilha	Brazil	The June 2000 hijacking of Bus 174 in Rio de Janeiro, Brazil	Not nominated	
Capturing the Friedmans	Andrew Jarecki	United States	Follows closely an American family accused of pedophilia	Nominated	
Charlie: The Life and Art of Charles Chaplin	Richard Schickel	United States	The life and times of Golden Age of Hollywood legend Charlie Chaplin	Not nominated	
The Fog of War	Errol Morris	United States	Robert McNamara and his involvement in the Vietnam War	Won Academy Award	
Heir to an Execution: A Granddaughter's Story	Marc Levin	United States	Explores the lives and deaths of her grandparents, Julius and Ethel Rosenberg, who were executed as spies in 1953.	Not nominated	
Inheritance: A Fisherman's Story	Peter Hegedus	Australia	After the River Tisza was polluted with tons of cyanide from an Australian-Romanian gold mine, local fisherman Balazs Meszaros struggled to survive. Travelling to Australia, he decides to confront the mining company officials.	Not nominated	
Lost Boys of Sudan	Megan Mylan and Jou Shenk	United States	Two boys from the Dinka tribe of Sudan who emigrated to the United States, who were part of the refugee group commonly known as the Lost Boys of Sudan	Not nominated	
My Architect	Nathaniel Kahn	United States	The career and familial relationships of the director's father, architect Louis Kahn	Nominated	
My Flesh and Blood	Jonathan Karsh	United States	The adopted children of Susan Tom, most of whom have significant physical disabilities	Not nominated	
The Weather Underground	Sam Green and Bill Siegel	United States	The rise and fall of the radical political group of the same name	Nominated	

=== 2004 ===
Film	Director(s)	Countrie(s)	Subject(s)	Result	Ref.
Born into Brothels	Zana Briski and Ross Kauffman	India; United States	Children of prostitutes in Sonagachi, Kolkata's red light district.	Won Academy Award	
Home of the Brave	Paola di Florio	United States	The 1965 murder of civil rights activist Viola Liuzzo	Not nominated	
Howard Zinn: You Can't Be Neutral on a Moving Train	Deb Ellis and Denis Mueller	United States	Historian and activist Howard Zinn	Not nominated	
In the Realms of the Unreal	Jessica Yu	United States	Outsider artist Henry Darger's magnum opus. The Story of the Vivian Girls, in What is known as the Realms of the Unreal, of the Glandeco-Angelinian War Storm, Caused by the Child Slave Rebellion	Not nominated	
Riding Giants	Stacy Peralta	United States	Surfing, Big wave riding	Not nominated	
The Ritchie Boys	Christian Bauer	Germany; Canada	Holocaust survivors share their story of fleeing to the United States, joining the US Army and returning to Europe to fight in World War II	Not nominated	
The Story of the Weeping Camel	Byambasuren Davaa and Luigi Falorni	Germany; Mongolia	A family of nomadic shepherds in the Gobi Desert trying to save the life of a rare white bactrian camel (Camelus bactrianus) calf after it was rejected by its mother.	Nominated	
Super Size Me	Morgan Spurlock	United States	A filmmaker eating nothing but McDonald's fast food for 30 days	Nominated	
Tell Them Who You Are	Mark Wexler	United States	The son of acclaimed cinematographer Haskell Wexler turns the camera on his father and their complicated history	Not nominated	
Touching the Void	Kevin Macdonald	United Kingdom	Joe Simpson and Simon Yates' near-fatal descent after making the first successful ascent of the West Face of Siula Grande in the Cordillera Huayhuash in the Peruvian Andes	Not nominated	
Tupac: Resurrection	Lauren Lazin	United States	Late rapper Tupac Shakur from his upbringing to his untimely death	Nominated	
Twist of Faith	Kirby Dick	United States	Sexual abuse by a priest in the Roman Catholic Diocese of Toledo, Ohio	Nominated	

=== 2005 ===
Film	Director(s)	Countrie(s)	Subject(s)	Result	Ref.
Darwin's Nightmare	Hubert Sauper	Austria; Belgium; France	Environmental and social effects of the fishing industry around Lake Victoria in Tanzania	Nominated	
The Devil and Daniel Johnston	Jeff Feuerzeig	United States	Outsider music artist Daniel Johnston and his struggles with paranoid schizophrenia	Not nominated	
Enron: The Smartest Guys in the Room	Alex Gibney	United States	The rise and fall of the real estate corporation Enron	Nominated	
Mad Hot Ballroom	Marilyn Agrelo	United States	The ballroom dance program for fifth graders in the New York City Department of Education	Not nominated	
March of the Penguins	Luc Jacquet	France	The daily lives of emperor penguins	Won Academy Award	
Murderball	Henry Alex Rubin and Dana Adam Shapiro	United States	American Wheelchair rugby players facing against Canadian wheelchair rugby players at the 2004 Paralympic Games	Nominated	
Street Fight	Marshall Curry	United States	The 2002 Newark mayoral election in which Newark City Councilman Cory Booker challenged incumbent mayor Sharpe James	Nominated	

=== 2007 ===
Film	Director(s)	Countrie(s)	Subject(s)	Result	Ref.
Autism: The Musical	Tricia Regan	United States	Children on the autism spectrum performing their own stage musical	Not nominated	
Body of War	Ellen Spiro and Phil Donahue	United States	The experiences of Iraq War veteran Tomas Young, including his paralysis from enemy gunshot wounds and his subsequent anti-war activism	Not nominated	
For the Bible Tells Me So	Daniel G. Karslake	United States	Follows how homosexuality is perceived in contemporary Christianity, as well as various interpretations of what the Bible says about sexual orientation	Not nominated	
Lake of Fire	Tony Kaye	United States	Follows the history of Abortion in the United States and the never-ending debate	Not nominated	
Nanking	Bill Guttentag and Dan Sturman	United States	Follows the Nanjing Massacre, committed in 1937 by the Imperial Japanese Army during the World War II in Nanjing, the former capital city of China.	Not nominated	
No End in Sight	Charles Ferguson	United States	Follows the American occupation of Iraq during the Iraq War	Nominated	
Operation Homecoming: Writing the Wartime Experience	Richard E. Robbins	United States	The writings of U.S. veterans of the Iraq and Afghanistan wars	Nominated	
The Price of Sugar	Bill Haney	Dominican Republic; United States	Exploitation of Haiti immigrants in the Dominican Republic involved with production of sugar, and the efforts of Spanish priest Father Christopher Hartley to ameliorate their situation	Not nominated	
Please Vote for Me	Weijun Chen	China	Elections for class monitor in a 3rd grade class in the Evergreen Primary School in Wuhan, China	Not nominated	
Sicko	Michael Moore	United States	Follows the Health insurance and Healthcare in the United States	Nominated	
Taxi to the Dark Side	Alex Gibney	United States	The December 2002 killing of an Afghan taxi driver named Dilawar, who was beaten to death by American soldiers while being held in extrajudicial detention and interrogated at a black site at Bagram air base	Won Academy Award	
War/Dance	Sean Fine and Andrea Nix Fine	United States	Three Acholi children living in a Ugandan refugee camp, who are preparing to compete in the National Music Competition in Kampala	Nominated	
White Light/Black Rain	Steven Okazaki	United States	The atermath of the atomic bombings of Hiroshima and Nagasaki, the humanitarian crise and its survivors	Not nominated	

=== 2008 ===
Film	Director(s)	Countrie(s)	Subject(s)	Result	Ref.
The Betrayal – Nerakhoon	Ellen Kuras and Thavisouk Phrasavath	United States	After the United States Secret War in Laos, a Laotian immigrant living in New York City tries assimilating into American life	Nominated	
Encounters at the End of the World	Werner Herzog	United States	Filmmaker Werner Herzog and cinematographer Peter Zeitlinger travel to Antarctica to meet the people who live and work there	Nominated	
The Garden	Scott Hamilton Kennedy	United States	Follows the story of the now demolished South Central Farm; a community garden and urban farm located in Los Angeles	Nominated	
Glass: A Portrait of Philip in Twelve Parts	Scott Hicks	United States	Follows the Classical music composer Philip Glass	Not nominated	
I.O.U.S.A.	Patrick Creadon	United States	Analyses the shape and impact of the National debt of the United States	Not nominated	
Man on Wire	James Marsh	United States	Highwire artist Philippe Petit's walking between the Twin Towers at the World Trade Center in New York	Won Academy Award	
Trouble the Water	Tia Lessin and Carl Deal	United States	Follows a young couple surviving Hurricane Katrina and facing their own troubled past	Nominated	

=== 2010 ===
Film	Director(s)	Countrie(s)	Subject(s)	Result	Ref.
Exit Through the Gift Shop	Banksy	United Kingdom	It tells the story of Thierry Guetta, who over several years filmed a host of street artists at work, including Shepard Fairey and Banksy, but failed to do anything with the footage. Eventually, Banksy decided to use the footage to make his own documentary	Nominated	
Gasland	Josh Fox	United States	It focuses on communities in the United States where natural gas drilling activity is a concern and, specifically, on hydraulic fracturing ("fracking"), a method of stimulating production in otherwise impermeable rock	Nominated	
Inside Job	Charles Ferguson	United States	The systemic corruption of the United States by the financial services industry and the consequences of that systemic corruption	Won Academy Award	
Restrepo	Tim Hetherington and Sebastian Junger	United States	It explores the year that Junger and Hetherington spent, on assignment for Vanity Fair, in Afghanistan's Korengal Valley	Nominated	
The Tillman Story	Amir Bar-Lev	United States	The untimely death of former football player turned soldier Pat Tillman	Not nominated	
Waiting for "Superman"	Davis Guggenheim	United States	Follows the American public education system by following several students as they strive to be accepted into competitive charter schools	Not nominated	
Waste Land	Lucy Walker	Brazil; United Kingdom	Follows artist Vik Muniz as he travels to the world's largest landfill in Jardim Gramacho, just outside Rio de Janeiro, to collaborate with a lively group of "catadores" (workers who salvage recyclable materials from the garbage) to make contemporary art using some of the materials they have picked	Nominated	

=== 2011 ===
Film	Director(s)	Countrie(s)	Subject(s)	Result	Ref.
Buck	Cindy Meehl	United States	Focuses on the life, career, and philosophy of the real-life "horse whisperer" Buck Brannaman	Not nominated	
Bill Cunningham New York	Richard Press	United States	Photographer Bill Cunningham, for decades has been obsessively and inventively chronicling fashion trends and high-society charity soirées for The New York Times Style section in his columns "On the Street" and "Evening Hours"	Not nominated	
Battle for Brooklyn	Michael Galinsky; Suki Hawley	United States	Follows the stories of a Brooklyn neighborhood as the residents fight to save their homes from being destroyed by an impending real estate project	Not nominated	
Hell and Back Again	Danfung Dennis	United States; United Kingdom; Afghanistan	Follows a sergeant in the United States Marine Corps who returns from the Afghanistan conflict with a badly broken leg and post-traumatic stress disorder	Nominated	
If a Tree Falls: A Story of the Earth Liberation Front	Marshall Curry	United States	The rise and fall of radical environmental group Earth Liberation Front	Nominated	
Jane's Journey	Lorenz Knauer	Germany; Tanzania	Follows Dr. Jane Goodall late career as a primatologist	Not nominated	
The Loving Story	Nancy Buirski	United States	Follows the Mildred and Richard Loving love story and their landmark U.S. Supreme Court case Loving v. Virginia (1967), which ended all race-based legal restrictions on marriage in the United States.	Not nominated	
Paradise Lost 3: Purgatory	Joe Berlinger and Bruce Sinofsky	United States	Third and final installment in the documentary trilogy about the West Memphis Three, three teenage boys wrongfully accused of the May 1993 murders and sexual mutilation of three prepubescent boys	Nominated	
Pina	Wim Wenders	Germany	During the preparation for the original documentary idea, Pina Bausch died unexpectedly, so Wenders cancelled the project, but the dancers of Bausch's company, Tanztheater Wuppertal, convinced him to proceed as planned, memorializing Bausch and her work	Nominated	
Project Nim	James Marsh	United States; United Kingdom	Follows the chimpanzee named Nim Chimpsky, who was the center of a 1970s research project to determine whether a primate could learn to speak using American Sign Language	Not nominated	
Semper Fi: Always Faithful	Tony Hardmon and Rachel Libert	United States	After the Death of Janey Ensminger, the nine-year-old daughter of Jerry Ensminger, from a rare type of leukemia, a grief-stricken father search for answers led to the shocking discovery of a Marine Corps cover-up of one of the largest water contamination incidents in U.S. history, the Camp Lejeune water contamination	Not nominated	
Sing Your Song	Susanne Rostock	United States	Recounts the life and legacy of singer, actor, and civil rights activist Harry Belafonte	Not nominated	
Undefeated	Daniel Lindsay and T. J. Martin	United States	Follows a high school American football team, the Manassas Tigers of Memphis, as they attempt a winning season after years of losses. The team is turned around by coach Bill Courtney, who helps form a group of young men into an academic and athletic team	Won Academy Award	
Under Fire: Journalists in Combat	Martyn Burke	Canada	Follows war journalists experiences of reporting from the frontline	Not nominated	
We Were Here	David Weissman	United States	Follows the HIV/AIDS crisis in San Francisco	Not nominated	

=== 2012 ===
Film	Director(s)	Countrie(s)	Subject(s)	Result	Ref.
Bully	Lee Hirsch	United States	Follows the lives of five students who face bullying on a daily basis in U.S. schools	Not nominated	
Chasing Ice	Jeff Orlowski	United States	Follows the efforts of nature photographer James Balog and his Extreme Ice Survey (EIS) to publicize the effects of climate change. Nominated - Best Original Song	Not nominated	
5 Broken Cameras	Emad Burnat and Guy Davidi	Palestine; Israel; France	A first-hand account of protests in Bil'in, a West Bank Palestinian village affected by the Israeli West Bank barrier	Nominated	
The Gatekeepers	Dror Moreh	Israel; France; Belgium; Germany	Follows the Israeli internal security service, Shin Bet, from the perspective of six of its former heads	Nominated	
How to Survive a Plague	David France	United States	The beginnings of ACT UP and TAG during the AIDS epidemic in the 1980s	Nominated	
The Invisible War	Kirby Dick	United States	Follows reports of sexual assault in the United States military	Nominated	
Searching for Sugar Man	Malik Bendjelloul	Sweden; United Kingdom; Finland	Details the efforts in the late 1990s of two Cape Town fans to find out whether the rumored death of American musician Sixto Rodriguez was true and, if not to discover what had become of him. Rodriguez's music, which had never achieved success in his home country of the United States, had become very popular in South Africa, although little was known about him there.	Won Academy Award	
This Is Not a Film	Jafar Panahi	Iran	Iranian filmmaker Jafar Panahi documents his own house arrest and resistance to censure in Iran	Not nominated	

=== 2013 ===
Film	Director(s)	Countrie(s)	Subject(s)	Result	Ref.
The Act of Killing	Joshua Oppenheimer and Christine Cynn	Denmark; Indonesia; Norway; United Kingdom	Follows individuals who participated in the Indonesian mass killings of 1965–66, wherein alleged communists and people opposed to the New Order regime were tortured and killed, with the killers, many becoming gangsters, still in power throughout the country	Nominated	
Blackfish	Gabriela Cowperthwaite	United States	Controversies surrounding the mistreatment of whales at Sea World	Not nominated	
Cutie and the Boxer	Zachary Heinzerling	United States	Follows the chaotic 40-year marriage of two artists, Noriko Shinohara and her husband the boxing painter Ushio	Nominated	
Dirty Wars	Richard Rowley	United States	Investigative journalist Jeremy Scahill travels to Afghanistan, Yemen, Somalia, and other countries where the United States has taken military action in the war on terror	Nominated	
God Loves Uganda	Roger Ross Williams	United States	It explores connections between evangelicalism in North America and in Uganda, suggesting that the North American influence is the reason behind the controversial Uganda Anti-Homosexuality Act, which at one point raised the possibility of the death penalty for gays and lesbians	Not nominated	
The Square	Jehane Noujaim	Egypt; United States	Depicts the Egyptian Crisis (2011–2014), starting with the 2011 Egyptian revolution at Tahrir Square	Nominated	
20 Feet from Stardom	Morgan Neville	United States	Using archival footage and new interviews, it details the behind-the-scenes experiences of such backup singers as Darlene Love, Merry Clayton, Lisa Fischer, Judith Hill, Jo Lawry, Claudia Lennear, and Tata Vega	Won Academy Award	

=== 2014 ===
Film	Director(s)	Countrie(s)	Subject(s)	Result	Ref.
Citizen Koch	Tia Lessin and Carl Deal	United States	Follows the political influence of American plutocrats on the political process following the US Supreme Court decision in Citizens United v. FEC which granted corporations the ability to anonymously spend unlimited money to influence public policy and elections	Not nominated	
Citizenfour	Laura Poitras	United States	Edward Snowden and his whistle-blowing movement on American espionage of foreign officials through his WikiLeaks website	Won Academy Award	
Finding Vivian Maier	John Maloof and Charlie Siskel	United States	Street photographer Vivian Maier and the rediscovery of her photography	Nominated	
The Internet's Own Boy	Brian Knappenberger	United States	Aaron Swartz and the case of United States v. Swartz	Not nominated	
Jodorowsky's Dune	Frank Pavich	United States; France	Cult filmmaker Alejandro Jodorowsky's attempts at adapting the classic sci-fi novel Dune	Not nominated	
Last Days in Vietnam	Rory Kennedy	United States	During the chaotic final weeks of the Vietnam War, the North Vietnamese Army closes in on Saigon as the panicked South Vietnamese people desperately attempt to escape. On the ground, American soldiers and diplomats confront whether to obey White House orders to evacuate American citizens only	Nominated	
Life Itself	Steve James	United States	Based on based on Roger Ebert's 2011 memoir of the same name, follows the Pulitzer Prize-winning film critic life and memories	Not nominated	
The Salt of the Earth	Wim Wenders and Juliano Ribeiro Salgado	France; Germany; Brazil	It portrays the works of Salgado's father, the Brazilian acclaimed photographer Sebastião Salgado	Nominated	
Virunga	Orlando von Einsiedel	United Kingdom; Democratic Republic of the Congo	Focuses on the conservation work of park rangers within the Congo's Virunga National Park during the rise of the violent M23 Rebellion in 2012 and investigates the activity of the British oil company Soco International within the UNESCO World Heritage Site	Nominated	

=== 2015 ===
Film	Director(s)	Countrie(s)	Subject(s)	Result	Ref.
Amy	Asif Kapadia	United Kingdom	The life and death of singer Amy Winehouse	Won Academy Award	
Best of Enemies	Robert Gordon and Morgan Neville	United States	The televised arguments between conservative commentator William F. Buckley Jr and progressive novelist Gore Vidal	Not nominated	
Cartel Land	Matthew Heineman	United States	Vigilante groups fighting Mexican drug cartels during Mexican drug war	Nominated	
Going Clear	Alex Gibney	United States	An exposé on the practices of the Church of Scientology	Not nominated	
He Named Me Malala	Davis Guggenheim	United States; United Arab Emirates	The life of young activist Malala Yousafzai	Not nominated	
Heart of a Dog	Laurie Anderson	United States	Composer Laurie Anderson's meditative ode to canines	Not nominated	
The Hunting Ground	Kirby Dick	United States	The incidence of sexual assault on college campuses in the United States and the reported failure of college administrations to deal with it adequately Nominated - Best Original Song	Not nominated	
Listen to Me Marlon	Stevan Riley	United Kingdom	Archival footage examining the life of Academy Award-winning actor Marlon Brando	Not nominated	
The Look of Silence	Joshua Oppenheimer	Denmark; Finland; France; Germany; Indonesia; Netherlands; Norway; United Kingdom; United States	A companion piece to Oppenheimer's 2012 documentary The Act of Killing follows the Indonesian mass killings of 1965–66	Nominated	
Meru	Jimmy Chin and Elizabeth Chai Vasarhelyi	United States	The first ascent of the "Shark's Fin" route on Meru Peak in the Indian Himalayas	Not nominated	
3 1/2 Minutes, 10 Bullets	Marc Silver	United States	Murder of Jordan Davis	Not nominated	
We Come as Friends	Hubert Sauper	Austria; France	War-ravaged South Sudan fighting for independence from North Sudan and its President Omar al-Bashir	Not nominated	
What Happened, Miss Simone?	Liz Garbus	United States	The life and troubled times of singer and civil rights activist Nina Simone	Nominated	
Where to Invade Next	Michael Moore	United States	Director Michael Moore spending time in various countries where he experiences alternative methods of dealing with social and economic ills experienced in the United States	Not nominated	
Winter on Fire: Ukraine's Fight for Freedom	Evgeny Afineevsky	Ukraine; United States; United Kingdom	Ukraine's fight for freedom during the Revolution of Dignity	Nominated	

=== 2016 ===
Film	Director(s)	Countrie(s)	Subject(s)	Result	Ref.
Cameraperson	Kirsten Johnson	United States	A cinematographer's collection of documentary footage	Not nominated	
Command and Control	Robert Kenner	United States	1980 Damascus Titan missile explosion in Damascus, Arkansas between September 18–19, 1980	Not nominated	
The Eagle Huntress	Otto Bell	Mongolia; United Kingdom; Kazakhstan; United States	Aisholpan Nurgaiv, a 13-year-old Kazakh girl from Mongolia, as she attempts to become the first female eagle hunter to compete in the eagle festival at Ulgii, Mongolia	Not nominated	
Fire at Sea	Gianfranco Rosi	Italy	Life at Lampedusa, Italy	Nominated	
Gleason	Clay Tweel	United States	Former football player Steve Gleason and his journey living with Amyotrophic lateral sclerosis (ALS) Nominated - Best Original Song	Not nominated	
Hooligan Sparrow	Nanfu Wang	China; United States	A child rape case in China involving a government official and the subsequent protests led by activists	Not nominated	
I Am Not Your Negro	Raoul Peck	France; United States	Author James Baldwin's unfinished memoir about being black in America	Nominated	
The Ivory Game	Kief Davidson and Richard Ladkani	United States	The poaching of elephants in Africa, related to the ivory trade in China and Hong Kong, and the repercussions of elephant poaching	Not nominated	
Life, Animated	Roger Ross Williams	United States	Owen Suskind, son of Pulitzer Prize-winning journalist Ron Suskind, diagnosed with autism learning about life and communication through classic Disney animated movies	Nominated	
OJ: Made in America	Ezra Edelman	United States	The examination of racial divides in America during the O. J. Simpson saga	Won Academy Award	
13th	Ava DuVernay	United States	A look at the 13th amendment and its effect on African Americans	Nominated	
Tower	Keith Maitland	United States	The 1966 University of Texas shooting perpetrated by Charles Whitman	Not nominated	
Weiner	Josh Kriegman and Elyse Steinberg	United States	The rise and fall of politician Anthony Weiner due to the sexting scandals that derailed his Congressional career	Not nominated	
The Witness	James D. Solomon	United States	The murder of Kitty Genovese and the subsequent investigation led by her brother, Bill	Not nominated	
Zero Days	Alex Gibney	United States	The phenomenon surrounding the Stuxnet computer virus and the development of the malware software known as "Olympic Games."	Not nominated	

=== 2017 ===
Film	Director(s)	Countrie(s)	Subject(s)	Result	Ref.
Abacus: Small Enough to Jail	Steve James	United States	A family-owned community bank, Abacus Federal Savings Bank, the only financial institution to face criminal charges following the subprime mortgage crisis	Nominated	
Chasing Coral	Jeff Orlowski	United States	A team of divers, scientists and photographers around the world who document the disappearance of coral reefs	Not nominated	
City of Ghosts	Matthew Heineman	United States	The Syrian media activist group Raqqa Is Being Slaughtered Silently after their homeland is taken over by ISIS in 2014	Not nominated	
Ex Libris: The New York Public Library	Frederick Wiseman	United States	The role of the New York Public Library as an egalitarian network of exploration, exchange and learning	Not nominated	
Faces Places	Agnes Varda and JR	France	Varda and JR traveling around rural France, creating portraits of the people they come across	Nominated	
Human Flow	Ai Weiwei	Germany	The current global refugee crisis	Not nominated	
Icarus	Bryan Fogel	United States	Fogel's exploration of the option of doping to win an amateur cycling race and happening upon a major international doping scandal when he asks for the help of Grigory Rodchenkov, the head of the Russian anti-doping laboratory	Won Academy Award	
An Inconvenient Sequel: Truth to Power	Bonni Cohen and Jon Shenk	United States	Former United States Vice President Al Gore's continuing mission to battle climate change	Not nominated	
Jane	Brett Morgen	United States	Iconic anthropologist Jane Goodall	Not nominated	
LA 92	Daniel Lindsay and T. J. Martin	United States	Archival coverage of the 1992 Rodney King riots	Not nominated	
Last Men in Aleppo	Feras Fayyad	Denmark; Syria	The lives of three White Helmets founders, Khaled Omar Harrah, Subhi Alhussen and Mahmoud as they grapple the dilemma to flee their country or stay and fight for it	Nominated	
Long Strange Trip	Amir Bar-Lev	United States	The career of the rock band the Grateful Dead	Not nominated	
One of Us	Heidi Ewing and Rachel Grady	United States	The lives of three ex-Hasidic Jews in Brooklyn	Not nominated	
Strong Island	Yance Ford	United States	The April 1992 murder of William Ford, the director's brother	Nominated	
Unrest	Jennifer Brea	United States	Brea faced chronic fatigue syndrome that struck just before she married her husband Omar Wasow	Not nominated	

=== 2018 ===
Film	Director(s)	Countrie(s)	Subject(s)	Result	Ref.
Charm City	Marilyn Ness	United States	A community in Baltimore, Maryland, over the span of three years of high violence	Not nominated	
Communion	Anna Zamecka	Poland	Ola, a 14-year-old girl who takes care of her dysfunctional, alcoholic father, autistic brother, mother who lives separately, and her preparation of family celebration of her brother's Holy Communion sacrament	Not nominated	
Crime + Punishment	Stephen T. Maing	United States	A group of black and Latino whistleblower cops and a private investigator who risk everything to expose illegal quota practices and their impact on young minorities	Not nominated	
Dark Money	Kimberly Reed	United States	The effects of corporate money and influence in the American political system	Not nominated	
The Distant Barking of Dogs	Simon Lereng Wilmont	Ukraine; Denmark; Finland; Sweden	The life of 10-year-old Ukrainian boy Oleg throughout a year during the war in Donbas	Not nominated	
Free Solo	Elizabeth Chai Vasarhelyi and Jimmy Chin	United States	Alex Honnold as he attempts to become the first person to ever free solo climb Yosemite National Park's 3,000 foot high El Capitan wall	Won Academy Award	
Hale County This Morning, This Evening	RaMell Ross	United States	The lives of black people in Hale County, Alabama	Nominated	
Minding the Gap	Bing Liu	United States	The lives and friendships of three young men growing up in Rockford, Illinois, united by their love of skateboarding	Nominated	
Of Fathers and Sons	Talal Derki	Germany; Lebanon; Netherlands; Qatar; Syria	Radical jihadism and terrorist training in Syria	Nominated	
On Her Shoulders	Alexandria Bombach	United States	Human rights activist Nadia Murad, as she met with politicians and journalists to alert the world to the massacres and kidnapping happening in Iraq	Not nominated	
RBG	Betsy West and Julie Cohen	United States	The life, legacy and career of Associate Justice of the Supreme Court of the United States, Ruth Bader Ginsburg	Nominated	
Shirkers	Sandi Tan	Singapore; United Kingdom; United States	The making of an independent thriller featuring a teenage assassin set in Singapore	Not nominated	
The Silence of Others	Almudena Carracedo and Robert Bahar	United States; Spain	The silenced fight of the victims from the dictatorship of Francisco Franco	Not nominated	
Three Identical Strangers	Tim Wardle	United States; United Kingdom	The lives of Edward Galland, David Kellman, and Robert Shafran, a set of identical triplet brothers adopted as infants by separate families	Not nominated	
Won't You Be My Neighbor?	Morgan Neville	United States	The life, legacy and guiding philosophy of children's television host Fred Rogers	Not nominated	

=== 2019 ===
Film	Director(s)	Countrie(s)	Subject(s)	Result	Ref.
Advocate	Rachel Leah Jones and Philippe Bellaïche	Israel	Human rights lawyer Leah Tsemel as she navigates through the Israeli judicial system in defense of Palestinians accused of terrorism	Not nominated	
American Factory	Steven Bognar and Julia Reichert	United States	Chinese company Fuyao's factory in Moraine that occupies Moraine Assembly, a shuttered General Motors plant	Won Academy Award	
The Apollo	Roger Ross Williams	United States	The history of Apollo Theater in Harlem, New York City	Not nominated	
Apollo 11	Todd Douglas Miller	United States	The 1969 Apollo 11 mission	Not nominated	
Aquarela	Viktor Kossakovsky	Germany; United Kingdom; Denmark; United States	Climate change depicted by water and ice around the world	Not nominated	
The Biggest Little Farm	John Chester	United States	John Chester and his wife Molly as they acquire and establish themselves on Apricot Lane Farms in Moorpark, California	Not nominated	
The Cave	Feras Fayyad	Syria; Denmark	Dr. Amani Ballour, a physician in Ghouta who is operating a makeshift hospital nicknamed "the Cave" during the Syrian Civil War	Nominated	
The Edge of Democracy	Petra Costa	Brazil	Political past of Costa in a personal way, in context with the first term of President Luiz Inácio Lula da Silva and the events leading to impeachment of Dilma Rousseff	Nominated	
For Sama	Waad Al-Kateab and Edward Watts	Syria; United Kingdom; United States	Al-Kateab's journey as a journalist and rebel in the Syrian civil war uprising as she and her husband raise their daughter Sama	Nominated	
The Great Hack	Jehane Noujaim and Karim Amer	United States	The Facebook–Cambridge Analytica data scandal	Not nominated	
Honeyland	Tamara Kotevska and Ljubomir Stefanov	North Macedonia	The life of Hatidže Muratova, a loner beekeeper of wild bees who lives in the remote mountain village of Bekirloja, North Macedonia	Nominated	
Knock Down the House	Rachel Lears	United States	Four female democrats who run for Congress in the 2018 United States elections: Alexandria Ocasio-Cortez, Amy Vilela, Cori Bush and Paula Jean Swearengin	Not nominated	
Maiden	Alex Holmes	United Kingdom	Tracy Edwards and the crew of the Maiden as they compete as the first all-woman crew in the 1989–1990 Whitbread Round the World Race	Not nominated	
Midnight Family	Luke Lorentzen	Mexico; United States	Ochoa family who run a private ambulance business	Not nominated	
One Child Nation	Nanfu Wang and Jialing Zhang	United States	The fallout of China's one-child policy that lasted from 1980 to 2015	Not nominated	

=== 2020 ===
Film	Director(s)	Countrie(s)	Subject(s)	Result	Ref.
All In: The Fight for Democracy	Liz Garbus and Lisa Cortés	United States	Voter suppression and the perspective and expertise of Stacey Abrams, the former Minority Leader of the Georgia House of Representatives	Not nominated	
Boys State	Jesse Moss and Amanda McBaine	United States	A thousand teenage boys attending Boys State in Texas, coming to build a representative government from the ground up	Not nominated	
Collective	Alexander Nanau	Romania	The 2016 public health scandal following the Colectiv nightclub fire	Nominated	
Crip Camp	Nicole Newnham and James Lebrecht	United States	Camp Jened campers who turned themselves into activists for the disability rights movement in the 1970s and follows their fight for accessibility legislation	Nominated	
Dick Johnson Is Dead	Kirsten Johnson	United States	Johnson's father Richard "Dick", who has dementia, portraying different ways in which he could ultimately die	Not nominated	
Gunda	Viktor Kossakovsky	United States; Norway; Spain	The daily life of a pig, two cows, and a one-legged chicken	Not nominated	
MLK/FBI	Sam Pollard	United States	The investigation and harassment of activist Martin Luther King Jr. by J. Edgar Hoover and the Federal Bureau of Investigation	Not nominated	
The Mole Agent	Maite Alberdi	Chile; Germany; Netherlands; Spain; United States	A private investigator, Rómulo, hires Sergio, an elderly man to go undercover in a nursing home in Chile	Nominated	
My Octopus Teacher	Pippa Ehrlich and James Reed	South Africa; United Kingdom	A year spent by filmmaker Craig Foster forging a relationship with wild common octopus in a South African kelp forest	Won Academy Award	
Notturno	Gianfranco Rosi	Italy; Germany; France	Different people from areas near war zones in the Middle East who are trying to start over again with their everyday lives	Not nominated	
The Painter and the Thief	Benjamin Ree	Norway; United States	Barbora Kysilkova, an artist, forming a friendship with Karl-Bertil Nordland, a man who stole her artwork	Not nominated	
76 Days	Hao Wu and Weixi Chen	China; United States	The struggles of patients and frontline medical professionals battling the COVID-19 pandemic in Wuhan	Not nominated	
Time	Garrett Bradley	United States	Sibil Fox Richardson, fighting for the release of her husband, Rob, who is serving a 60-year prison sentence for engaging in an armed bank robbery	Nominated	
The Truffle Hunters	Michael Dweck and Gregory Kershaw	United States; Italy; Greece	A group of aging men hunt in the woods in Northern Italy, for a prized quarry, the Alba truffle	Not nominated	
Welcome to Chechnya	David France	United States	LGBT Chechen refugees as they made their way out of anti-gay purges in Chechnya of the late 2010s	Not nominated	

=== 2021 ===
Film	Director(s)	Countrie(s)	Subject(s)	Result	Ref.
Ascension	Jessica Kingdon	United States	The pursuit of the Chinese Dream	Nominated	
Attica	Stanley Nelson Jr. and Traci Curry	United States	The infamous 1971 Attica Prison riot	Nominated	
Billie Eilish: The World's a Little Blurry	R. J. Cutler	United States	The career and creative process of singer-songwriter Billie Eilish	Not nominated	
Faya Dayi	Jessica Beshir	United States; Ethiopia; Qatar	The rituals of khat, a psychoactive plant that plays an important role in Ethiopia's economy and culture	Not nominated	
The First Wave	Matthew Heineman	United States	A hospital in New York City, as it battles the COVID-19 pandemic	Not nominated	
Flee	Jonas Poher Rasmussen	Denmark; France; Norway; Sweden; United States	Amin Nawabi, who shares his hidden past of fleeing his home country of Afghanistan to Denmark for the first time	Nominated	
In the Same Breath	Nanfu Wang	United States	The response of the Chinese and American governments to the COVID-19 pandemic	Not nominated	
Julia	Julie Cohen and Betsy West	United States	The life of cooking teacher and television personality Julia Child	Not nominated	
President	Camilla Nielsson	Denmark; Norway; United States; Zimbabwe	The career of Nelson Chamisa who takes on the corrupt ruling party in Zimbabwe	Not nominated	
Procession	Robert Greene	United States	The six men, who suffered abuse by priests, looking for peace	Not nominated	
The Rescue	Elizabeth Chai Vasarhelyi and Jimmy Chin	United States; United Kingdom	The 2018 Tham Luang cave rescue	Not nominated	
Simple as Water	Megan Mylan	United States	The Syrian families across five countries, revealing the impact of war, separation, and displacement	Not nominated	
Summer of Soul	Ahmir Khalib Thompson	United States	The 1969 Harlem Cultural Festival	Won Academy Award	
The Velvet Underground	Todd Haynes	United States	The life and times of influential rock band The Velvet Underground	Not nominated	
Writing with Fire	Sushmit Ghosh and Rintu Thomas	India	The journalists running the Dalit women-led newspaper Khabar Lahariya, as they shift from 14 years of print to digital journalism using smartphones	Nominated	

=== 2022 ===
Film	Director(s)	Countrie(s)	Subject(s)	Result	Ref.
A House Made of Splinters	Simon Lereng Wilmont	Denmark; Ukraine; Sweden	The care of the staff of an institution for children who have been removed from their homes.	Nominated	
All That Breathes	Shaunak Sen	India; United States; United Kingdom	Two brothers devote their lives to protect one casualty of the turbulent times: the bird known as the black kite	Nominated	
All the Beauty and the Bloodshed	Laura Poitras	United States	The life of artist Nan Goldin and the downfall of the Sackler family	Nominated	
Bad Axe	David Siev	United States	David Siev's Asian-American family struggles to keep their local restaurant afloat amidst racial tensions and the COVID-19 pandemic	Not nominated	
Children of the Mist	Ha Le Diem	Vietnam	The Di Hmong teenager faces challenges growing up. In traditional Di culture, girls are married at the age of 14. But at school he learns that there are alternatives.	Not nominated	
Descendant	Margaret Brown	United States	The community of Africatown and the descendants of some of the last known enslaved Africans that were brought to the United States	Not nominated	
Fire of Love	Sara Dosa	United States; Canada	The life and career of the daring French volcanologists Katia and Maurice Krafft, who were ultimately killed in the 1991 eruption of Mount Unzen	Nominated	
Hallelujah: Leonard Cohen, a Journey, a Song	Daniel Geller and Dayna Goldfine	United States; Canada	The story of Leonard Cohen, and his song "Hallelujah"	Not nominated	
Hidden Letters	Violet Du Feng; Qing Zhao	China	The story of two Chinese women trying to balance their lives as independent women in modern China while confronting the traditional identity that defines but also oppresses them.	Not nominated	
The Janes	Tia Lessin and Emma Pildes	United States	The story of a clandestine service for women seeking safe, affordable, and illegal abortions, calling themselves JANE	Not nominated	
Last Flight Home	Ondi Timoner	United States	In his final days, we discover Eli Timoner and an extraordinary life of wild achievements, tragic loss and most of all, enduring love	Not nominated	
Moonage Daydream	Brett Morgen	Germany; United States	David Bowie's creative, spiritual and musical journey	Not nominated	
Navalny	Daniel Roher	United States	The poisoning of Russian opposition leader Alexei Navalny	Won Academy Award	
Retrograde	Matthew Heineman	United States	The events that took place during the last nine months of the United States' 20-year war in Afghanistan	Not nominated	
The Territory	Alex Pritz	United States; United Kingdom; Brazil; Denmark	The attempts of a young indigenous leader of the Uru-eu-wau-wau, an Amazonian tribe contacted by the Brazilian government only in 1980	Not nominated	

=== 2023 ===
Film	Director(s)	Countrie(s)	Subject(s)	Result	Ref.
32 Sounds	Sam Green	United States	Sound and its effects on human's perception of time and the world.	Not nominated	
American Symphony	Matthew Heineman	United States	A year in the life of musician Jon Batiste chronicling his career in music and his marriage with Suleika Jaouad as they deal with her leukemia. Nominated - Best Original Song	Not nominated	
Apolonia, Apolonia	Lea Glob	Denmark; Poland; France	The coming-of-age story of Apolonia Sokol as she finds her place in the art world, told through 13 years.	Not nominated	
Beyond Utopia	Madeleine Gavin	United States	The work of Pastor Sungeun Kim, a South Korean human rights activist who has helped rescuing North Korean defectors.	Not nominated	
Bobi Wine: The People's President	Moses Bwayo and Christopher Sharp	United Kingdom; Uganda; United States	The campaign trail of Ugandan politician, singer, and actor Bobi Wine leading to the 2021 Ugandan general election.	Nominated	
Desperate Souls, Dark City and the Legend of Midnight Cowboy	Nancy Buirski	United States	The journey of making and producing John Schlesinger's 1969 film Midnight Cowboy.	Not nominated	
The Eternal Memory	Maite Alberdi	Chile	The relationship between actress Paulina Urrutia and journalist Augusto Góngora as they struggle with Gongora's Alzheimer's disease diagnosis.	Nominated	
Four Daughters	Kaouther Ben Hania	Tunisia; Germany; France; Saudi Arabia	After two daughters of a Tunisian woman disappeared, the filmmaker invites professional actresses to compensate for the loss.	Nominated	
Going to Mars: The Nikki Giovanni Project	Joe Brewster and Michèle Stephenson	United States	The life of American poet Nikki Giovanni and the historical periods she lived through from civil rights movement and Black Arts Movement to Black Lives Matter.	Not nominated	
In the Rearview	Maciek Hamela	Ukraine; Poland; France	Following the first days of the Russian invasion of Ukraine, a Polish van travels through Ukraine's streets serving as a refuge for citizens.	Not nominated	
Stamped from the Beginning	Roger Ross Williams	United States	A hybrid documentary based on Ibram X. Kendi's 2016 non-fiction book Stamped from the Beginning: The Definitive History of Racist Ideas.	Not nominated	
Still: A Michael J. Fox Movie	Davis Guggenheim	United States	The life of American actor Michael J. Fox and his struggle with Parkinson's disease.	Not nominated	
A Still Small Voice	Luke Lorentzen	United Kingdom	A chaplain completing a year-long hospital residency facing the challenges and spiritual questions that come from her experiences with her patients.	Not nominated	
To Kill a Tiger	Nisha Pahuja	Canada	A family in Jharkhand, India campaigning for justice for the teenage daughter, who has brutally raped.	Nominated	
20 Days in Mariupol	Mstyslav Chernov	Ukraine	The twenty days spent by the filmmaker and his colleagues in besieged Mariupol after Russia's invasion of Ukraine.	Won Academy Award	

=== 2024 ===
Film	Director(s)	Countrie(s)	Subject(s)	Result	Ref.
The Bibi Files	Alexis Bloom	United States	The leaked interrogation footage of the trial of Benjamin Netanyahu, prime minister of Israel.	Not nominated	
Black Box Diaries	Shiori Itō	United States; United Kingdom; Japan	The investigation into Itō's own sexual assault case, committed by Noriyuki Yamaguchi, director of the Tokyo Broadcasting System.	Nominated	
Dahomey	Mati Diop	France; Senegal; Benin	Dramatised account of 26 royal treasures from the Kingdom of Dahomey (in modern-day Republic of Benin), which were held in a museum in France.	Not nominated	
Daughters	Natalie Rae and Angela Patton	United States	The account of 4 young girls as part of afatherhood program in a Washington, D.C., jail.	Not nominated	
Eno	Gary Hustwit	United States; United Kingdom	An account of English ambient music artist Brian Eno, produced with a computer software capable to select footage and edit the film in 52 quintillion possible iterations.	Not nominated	
Frida	Carla Gutierrez	Mexico; United States	The life of Frida Kahlo told through her own writings and interviews.	Not nominated	
Hollywoodgate	Ibrahim Nash'at	Germany; United States	The daily life of Taliban air force commander Mawlawi Mansour, and the fundamentalist M.J. Mukhtar, following the American withdrawal from Afghanistan.	Not nominated	
No Other Land	Basel Adra; Hamdan Ballal; Yuval Abraham and Rachel Szor	Palestine; Norway	The struggle of Palestinian activist Basel Adra over the destruction of the Masafer Yatta villages due to the occupation of the Israeli army.	Won Academy Award	
Porcelain War	Brendan Bellomo and Slava Leontyev	United States; Australia; Ukraine	The experience of Ukrainian artists as they face the current Russian occupation in Ukraine.	Nominated	
Queendom	Agniia Galdanova	United States; France	The art and activism of Gena Marvin, a queer artist from Russia challenging her country's anti-LGBTQ+ laws.	Not nominated	
The Remarkable Life of Ibelin	Benjamin Ree	Norway	The secret life of Mats Steen, a World of Warcraft gamer with Duchenne muscular dystrophy.	Not nominated	
Soundtrack to a Coup d'Etat	Johan Grimonprez	Belgium; France; Netherlands	The political background of the crash of Abbey Lincoln and Max Roach at the UN Security Council in protest of the murder of Patrice Lumumba.	Nominated	
Sugarcane	Julian Brave NoiseCat and Emily Kassie	United States; Canada	The investigation into the abuse and disappearances of Canadian indigenous children in the nearby Sugarcane Reserve.	Nominated	
Union	Brett Story and Stephen Maing	United States	The journey of Amazon Labor Union to unionize Amazon's JFK8 warehouse on Staten Island.	Not nominated	
Will & Harper	Josh Greenbaum	United States	A road trip across the United States between Will Ferrell and his friend Harper Steele, who completed her gender transition.	Not nominated	

=== 2025 ===
Film	Director(s)	Countrie(s)	Subject(s)	Result	Ref.
The Alabama Solution	Andrew Jarecki and Charlotte Kaufman	United States	Prison system in Alabama from the perspective of incarcerated leaders.	Nominated	
Apocalypse in the Tropics	Petra Costa	Brazil; United States	The influence of evangelical Christianity on far-right politics in Brazil.	Not nominated	
Coexistence, My Ass!	Amber Fares	United States; France	Israeli comedian Noam Shuster-Eliassi tackles inequality and the Israeli–Palestinian conflict.	Not nominated	
Come See Me in the Good Light	Ryan White	United States	Poet/activist Andrea Gibson and Megan Falley navigate an examination of love and mortality after Gibson is diagnosed with terminal ovarian cancer.	Nominated	
Cover-Up	Laura Poitras and Mark Obenhaus	United States	Explores the investigative journalism career of Seymour Hersh, who covered the U.S. Army torture scandals during the Vietnam War and the Iraq War.	Not nominated	
Cutting Through Rocks	Mohammadreza Eyni and Sara Khaki	Iran; Qatar; Chile; Canada; Netherlands; Germany	Follows the first Iranian woman elected as councilwoman in a rural poor village.	Nominated	
Folktales	Heidi Ewing and Rachel Grady	United States; Norway	Follows teenagers at a folk high school in Norway, where they must rely on each other and a pack of sled dogs as they grow.	Not nominated	
Holding Liat	Brandon Kramer	United States; Israel	Follows Liat Beinin Atzili and her husband, who were kidnapped from their kibbutz during the October 7 attacks.	Not nominated	
Mr Nobody Against Putin	David Borenstein	Denmark; Czech Republic; Germany	Follows Pavel Talankin, a teacher in a poor mining town near the Ural Mountains, who documents the Putin administration movements to control public perception during the ongoing Russo-Ukrainian war.	Won Academy Award	
Mistress Dispeller	Elizabeth Lo	United States; China	Follows a woman in China who hires a professional to go undercover and break up her husband's affair.	Not nominated	
My Undesirable Friends: Part I — Last Air in Moscow	Julia Loktev	United States; Russia	Follows the persistence of several independent Russian journalists to resist Russia's repression of press free speech.	Not nominated	
The Perfect Neighbor	Geeta Gandbhir	United States	Follows the racially motivated assassination of Ajike Owens, by her white neighbor Susan Louise Lorincz, in Ocala, Florida.	Nominated	
Seeds	Brittany Shyne	United States	Follows Black generational family farmers in the American South.	Not nominated	
2000 Meters to Andriivka	Mstyslav Chernov	Ukraine; United States	Follows a Ukrainian platoon during a mission to liberate the Russian-occupied village of Andriivka, during the ongoing Russo-Ukrainian War.	Not nominated	
Yanuni	Richard Ladkani	Brazil; United States; Canada	Indigenous chief Juma Xipaia fights to protect native lands in Brazil despite assassination attempts.	Not nominated	

== See also ==
- Academy Award for Best Documentary Feature
- Academy Award for Best Documentary (Short Subject)
- Golden Globe Award for Best Documentary Film
