= Chasing Time =

Chasing Time may refer to:

- Chasing Time (Fates Warning album), a compilation album by Fates Warning
- Chasing Time: The Bedlam Sessions, a live album and DVD released by James Blunt in 2006
- Chasing Time (TV series), a UK television series that ran between 2001 and 2003
- "Chasing Time" (song), a song by Azealia Banks
- Chasing Time (film), a 2024 American documentary
