= The Good Reporter =

2026 collective biography by Indian journalists

- Author: Disha Mullick; Geeta Devi; Harshita Verma; Kavita Bundelkhandi; Lakshmi Sharma; Lalita; Meera Devi; Nazni Rizvi; Shyamkali; Suneeta Prajapati
- Language: English
- Subject: Khabar Lahariya, rural journalism
- Genre: Collective biography
- Publisher: Simon & Schuster India
- Publication date: 2026
- Publication place: India
- Media type: Print

The Good Reporter: A Memoir of Journalism in the 21st Century is a 2026 collective biography of Khabar Lahariya, an Indian rural news outlet run by women, co-written by ten of its journalists and staff. Published by Simon & Schuster India, the book was written by Disha Mullick together with Geeta Devi, Harshita Verma, Kavita Bundelkhandi, Lakshmi Sharma, Lalita, Meera Devi, Nazni Rizvi, Shyamkali and Suneeta Prajapati, who together lead the organisation.

== Background ==
Khabar Lahariya began in 2002 in the Bundelkhand region of Uttar Pradesh, growing out of a homemade newsletter first produced in the 1990s as part of a women's literacy programme in Banda district. It went on to become India's first hyperlocal digital news outlet run entirely by women, and by the mid-2020s reached about five million people a month through a network of roughly two dozen reporters across sixteen districts of Uttar Pradesh and Madhya Pradesh. The organisation was the subject of Writing with Fire, a 2021 documentary by Rintu Thomas and Sushmit Ghosh that was nominated for the Academy Award for Best Documentary Feature.

== Structure and content ==
The book is written as a collective biography, drawing on a feminist research method in which contributors share individual memories that are combined into a single, layered account. It was developed partly through workshops, including one held in Banda in July 2023, in which contributors recorded their memories of specific stories and events. The narrative moves between contributors' personal histories and their reporting, covering subjects including caste, gender, land disputes and local crime, and addresses the disagreements and friction among the group alongside their collaboration.

== Reception ==
Writing in Feminism in India, the reviewer said the book resists an "outside-in" narrative that flattens the journalists into a single, simplified identity, and instead uses multiple authorship to foreground the differing caste, class, educational and geographic backgrounds of its contributors. Nieman Reports described the book as interweaving personal memory with reporting anecdotes to examine how the journalists choose which stories to tell and how to tell them. Scroll.in published an excerpt from the book alongside its review coverage.
