= Kavita Devi =

Kavita Devi may refer to:

- Kavita Devi (journalist), Indian journalist and co-founder of Khabar Lahariya
- Kavita Devi (kabaddi), Indian kabaddi player
- Kavita Devi (wrestler), Indian professional wrestler
- Kavita Devi (politician) (born 1975), member of the Bihar Legislative Assembly for Korha Assembly constituency
