= Chasing Time (film) =

2024 American documentary film

- Theatrical release poster
- Directed by: Sarah Keo; Jeff Orlowski
- Written by: Sarah Keo; Jeff Orlowski; Dave Wruck
- Produced by: Brette Ragland; Larissa Rhodes; Jeff Orlowski; Stacey Piculell
- Starring: James Balog; Kieran Baxter; Hrafnhildur Hannesdóttir; Svavar Jónatansson; Jeff Orlowski
- Cinematography: Jeff Orlowski
- Edited by: Dave Wruck
- Music by: Mark Crawford
- Production company: Exposure Labs
- Distributed by: PBS
- Release date: April 27, 2024 (Hot Docs Festival)
- Running time: 40 min
- Country: United States
- Language: English

Chasing Time is a 2024 American documentary short film directed by the first time filmmaker Sarah Keo and Jeff Orlowski. The film offers a reflective examination of time and mortality as it follows nature photographer James Balog and his team during the final phase of a multi‑decade project that has produced more than one million images. The short documentary reunites Balog with the Emmy Award-winning team behind Chasing Ice.

It was shortlisted for the Best Documentary Short Film at the 98th Academy Awards.

== Synopsis ==
The film follows nature photographer James Balog as he concludes the Extreme Ice Survey, a project he launched in 2006 to record the effects of global warming using dozens of time‑lapse cameras placed at glacier sites around the world. Over the years, the survey captured more than 1.5 million images showing significant ice loss and glacier collapse. The documentary also highlights Balog's ongoing research into the connections between melting ice, wildfires, and atmospheric change, while reflecting on the personal meaning of his decades‑long work.

== Cast ==
- James Balog
- Kieran Baxter
- Hrafnhildur Hannesdóttir
- Svavar Jónatansson
- Jeff Orlowski

== Release ==
Chasing Time had its world premiere at the Hot Docs Canadian International Documentary Festival on April 27, 2024.

It was screened on 11 May 2024, at the 2024 Seattle International Film Festival, and on May 25, at the Mountainfilm.

On 14 November 2024, it was screened in the Shorts: Climate Countdown at Doc NYC along with other two films.

It was presented as Part of SHORTS: The Blue Between Us at the Woods Hole Film Festival on July 13, 2025.

It premiered on 18 November 2025, on PBS and is available for streaming. The film also launched the Season 8 of the POV Shorts.

== Accolades ==
Award	Date of ceremony	Category	Recipient(s)	Result	Ref.
Woods Hole Film Festival	July 31, 2025	Audience Award for Short Documentary	Chasing Time	Runner-up	

== See also ==
- Academy Award for Best Documentary Short Film
- Submissions for Best Documentary Short Academy Award
