= Chasing Coral =

2017 American documentary film

- Poster
- Directed by: Jeff Orlowski
- Written by: Davis Coombe; Vickie Curtis; Jeff Orlowski
- Produced by: Jeff Orlowski; Larissa Rhodes
- Cinematography: Andrew Ackerman; Jeff Orlowski
- Edited by: Davis Coombe
- Music by: Saul Simon MacWilliams; Dan Romer
- Production companies: Exposure Labs; Argent Pictures; Code Blue Foundation; EarthSense Foundation; The Kendeda Fund; Sustainable Films
- Distributed by: Netflix
- Release date: 2017
- Running time: 93 minutes
- Country: United States
- Language: English

Chasing Coral is a 2017 American documentary film about a team of divers, scientists and photographers around the world who document the disappearance of coral reefs. Chasing Coral was produced by Exposure Labs and directed by Jeff Orlowski. It premiered at the 2017 Sundance Film Festival and was released globally on Netflix as a Netflix Original Documentary in July 2017. Jeff Orlowski had previously directed the movie Chasing Ice in 2012, which shares a similar plot to Chasing Coral.

The film received investment from Wayne Chang, who also served as associate producer.

== Soundtrack ==
Saul Simon MacWilliams and Dan Romer composed the score for the film. Romer also co-wrote an original song, "Tell Me How Long", featuring Kristen Bell.

== Reception ==
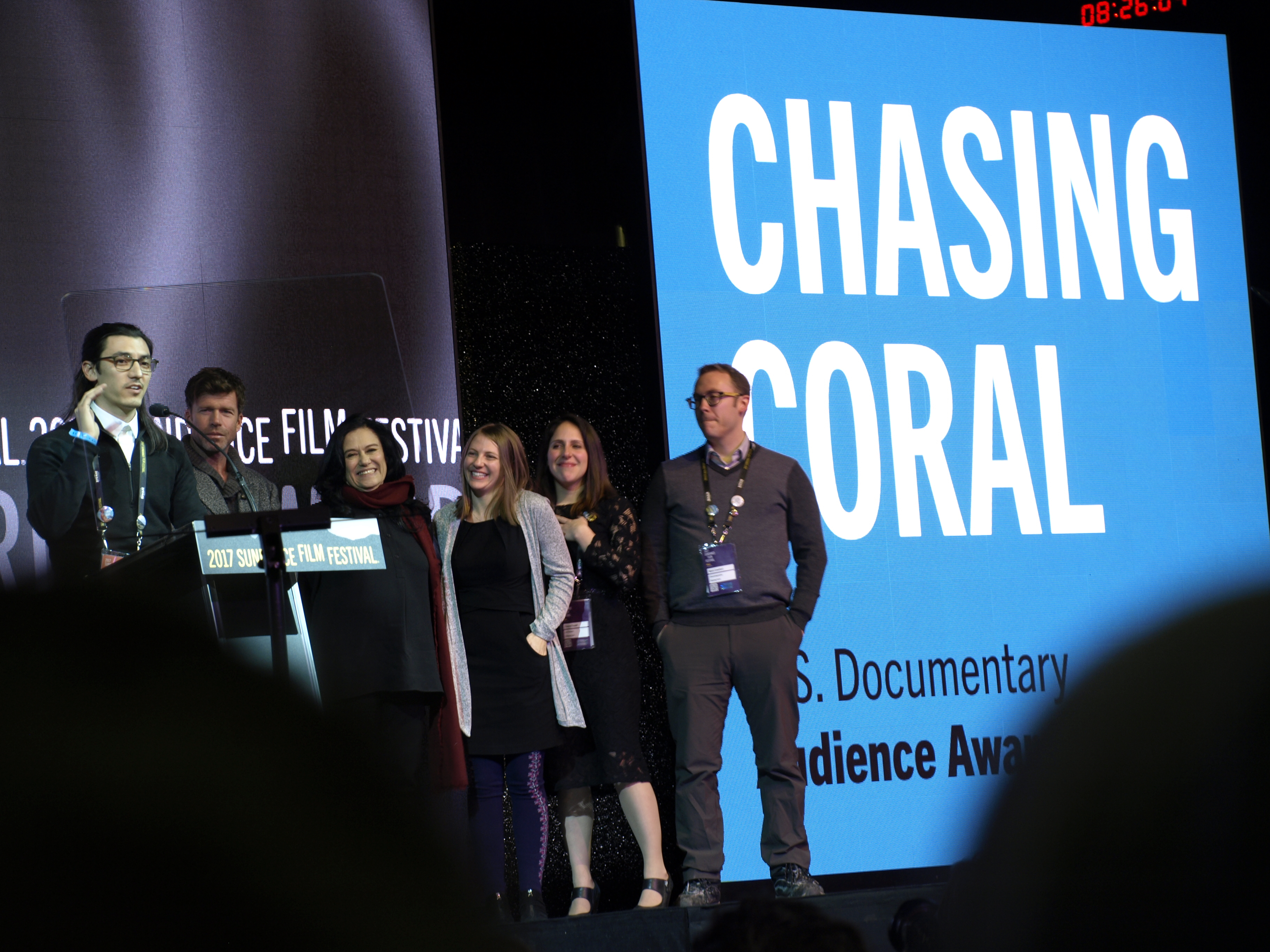
Chasing Coral receiving the U.S. Documentary Audience Award at Sundance Film Festival

The film won the Audience Award for U.S. Documentary at the 2017 Sundance Film Festival.
