= Rintu Thomas =

Indian filmmaker

- Born: Kottayam, India
- Education: A.J.K. Mass Communication Research Centre, Lady Shri Ram College
- Occupation: Filmmaker
- Years active: 2009 - present

Rintu Thomas is an Academy Award nominated documentary filmmaker and director-producer from India.

Her Peabody-winning documentary Writing with Fire, co-directed with Sushmit Ghosh, is the first Indian feature documentary to be nominated for an Academy Award for Best Documentary Feature. The film also won the Audience Award and Special Jury Award in the World Cinema Documentary Competition at 2021 Sundance Film Festival. Thomas is also known for directing Timbaktu, a short documentary which won the National Film Award for the Best Environment Film at the 60th National Film Awards and Dilli, which was awarded Best Documentary at the Jaipur International Film Festival in 2012. She is the co-founder of the award-winning production company, Black Ticket Films. In 2021, she was awarded the IDA Courage Under Fire Award for her body of work.

== Education ==
Thomas received her MA in mass communication from A.J.K. Mass Communication Research Centre Jamia University, New Delhi. Her Master's thesis film Flying Inside My Body won numerous student documentary awards. She received her BA in English literature from Lady Shri Ram College at Delhi University in 2006. Her professional work has won support from various organizations, including Japan Foundation's HANDs Fellowship (2016), Sundance Institute's Fellowship (2018), Skoll Stories of Change Fellow (2019), IDA Logan Elevate Honoree (2021).

== Career ==
Thomas, along with long-standing partner, Sushmit Ghosh has directed and produced over 150 short documentaries under their Black Ticket Films banner. Her short documentary Dilli premiered at the NASDAQ in Times Square, New York City in 2011 and won 22 international awards including 10 Best Short Documentary Awards. Films directed by Thomas has been screened at several top-tier international film festivals and global platforms including the United Nations Climate Change Conference and Lincoln Center for Performing Arts. Her work has been profiled by The New York Times, Washington Post, Time Magazine, The Atlantic, The Guardian, The Financial Times, Le Monde, The Hollywood Reporter, Variety, Deadline, No Film School, The Asahi Shimbun among others.

Thomas serves as a mentor for several international film labs and has served as a jury member for Irish Film & Television Academy Awards, International Documentary Association Awards, Points North Fellowship International Documentary Film Festival Amsterdam Academy, IDA Enterprise Documentary Fund, Alternativa Film Awards, UNESCO film programme for young adults.

Thomas' first feature-length documentary, Writing With Fire, premiered on 29 January 2021 in the Sundance Film Festival's World Cinema Documentary Competition. One of the first reviews was The Washington Post describing it as "The most inspiring journalism movie – maybe ever". Indiewire's Kate Erbland in her review of the documentary wrote, "Armed with eagle-eyed filmmakers and compelling subjects, the film deftly blends the (inextricably linked) personal and professional sides of the journalists' work, offering up a wide-ranging look at a vital outlet with so many stories to tell…the result is profound".

It was the first Indian film to win a Peabody Award, and the jury described the winner as one of "the most compelling and empowering stories released in 2022 across broadcasting and streaming media". The New York Times chose it as a Critics' Pick and the film obtained nominations for Best Documentary from the Grierson Awards, International Documentary Association Awards and Producers Guild of America Awards. Along with winning 40 awards, it is India's first documentary to be nominated for an Academy Award. In India, the documentary film premiered at the Dharamshala International Film Festival on 5 November 2022.

Following the New York premiere of the documentary at Doc NYC in November 2021, the documentary had a theatrical release in the United States, with the opening weekend at the Film Forum in New York. In August 2023, it had a theatrical release in Japan, across 50 Japanese theatres in 22 prefectures.

== Filmography ==
Year	Title	Worked As
2010	In Search of My Home	Director, Producer
2011	Dilli	Director, Producer
2012	Timbaktu	Director
2021	Writing With Fire	Director, producer, editor
