= The Agronomist =

- Theatrical release poster
- Directed by: Jonathan Demme
- Written by: Jonathan Demme
- Produced by: Jonathan Demme; Edwidge Danticat; Bevin McNamara; Peter Saraf
- Starring: Jean Dominique; Michèle Montas
- Cinematography: Aboudja; Jonathan Demme; Bevin McNamara; Peter Saraf
- Edited by: Lizzie Gelber; Bevin McNamara
- Music by: Wyclef Jean
- Distributed by: THINKFilm
- Release dates: February 23, 2003 (Miami International Film Festival); April 23, 2004 (US)
- Running time: 90 minutes
- Country: United States
- Languages: English; French; Haitian Creole
- Box office: $226,189

The Agronomist is a 2003 American documentary written and directed by Jonathan Demme about Jean Dominique. The documentary follows the life of Dominique, who ran Haiti's first independent radio station, Radio Haiti-Inter, during multiple repressive regimes.

== Summary ==
The titular Agronomist is Jean Leopold Dominique, owner of Radio Haiti-Inter, Haiti's first independent radio station. The documentary consists of historical footage and personal interviews director Jonathan Demme conducted years earlier with Dominique.

The film follows Dominique's career as a broadcaster from the founding of Radio Haiti-Inter in 1960 focusing on injustice and promoting democracy for the masses, resulting in clashes with the ruling regimes and Dominique's eventual assassination. Following his death, his wife and fellow journalist, Michèle Montas, broadcast from the station for another three years. Radio Haiti-Inter ceased operations in 2003.

== Reception ==
The Agronomist was shown on May 3, 2004, at the UN Headquarters in NYC while observing World Press Freedom Day. There were no seats vacant for the showing at noon.

The film received favorable reviews by critics. It received a 96% "fresh" rating on Rotten Tomatoes Praise focused on the use of historical footage combined with interviews.

Box office receipts totaled $226,189 in 21 theaters in the U.S.

== Home media ==
The film was released on DVD on June 7, 2005, with English and French spoken language tracks and subtitles in English, Spanish, and French.

== See also ==
- Reporters Without Borders
