= Sushmit Ghosh =

Indian filmmaker

- Education: A.J.K. Mass Communication Research Centre
- Occupation: Filmmaker
- Years active: 2007 - Present

Sushmit Ghosh is an Academy award nominated filmmaker based in India. His Peabody-award winning documentary film, Writing With Fire, became the first Indian feature documentary to be nominated for the Academy Award for Best Documentary Feature. It premiered at the 2021 Sundance Film Festival, winning the Audience Award as well as the Special Jury Award in the World Cinema Documentary Competition. Ghosh’s work has also been nominated for the Grierson, IDA and PGA awards. He is a co-founder of the award-winning production company, Black Ticket Films and a member of the Academy of Motion Picture Arts and Sciences.

== Education ==
Ghosh received his Masters in Mass Communication from the A.J.K. Mass Communication Research Centre, Jamia University, New Delhi in 2008. Ghosh’s foray into filmmaking was accidental, resulting from the success of a solo exhibition of his photographs curated by the British High Commission, which later became a part of a travelling exhibition that was taken to Pakistan, Sri Lanka, Bangladesh and the United Kingdom. This led him to the beginning of his debut film, Bullets and Butterflies, which traces the journey of a disabled street child and a motorcycling enthusiast, as they travel 1,500 kilometres over 7 days from Delhi to Himachal Pradesh, inadvertently also mapping an unlikely friendship. The film, which premiered in 2007 and went on to play in over 50 film festivals, won seven awards and was inducted into the curriculum of universities in Canada, UK and France. Bullets and Butterflies was broadcast on NDTV in 2008.

Ghosh’s films have been supported by the British High Commission, The National Geographic, The Sundance Institute, The Tribeca Institute, the Finnish Film Foundation, among others. In 2021, he was awarded the Courage Under Fire Award by the International Documentary Association.

== Career ==
In 2009, Ghosh co-founded Black Ticket Films with Rintu Thomas and the duo have together directed and produced over 150 short documentaries under the company banner. His short documentary Dilli, is a visual poem exploring notions of home, public space and belonging. It was released in 2011 and went on to win 22 awards including 10 best Short Documentary awards. Dilli was broadcast on NDTV and NBC. In 2012, Ghosh co-directed and shot Timbaktu, a meditation on life and sustenance, explored through the story of a small village in Andhra Pradesh, India. It won the National Film Award for the Best Environment Film at the 60th National Film Awards and screened at major environment festivals and sustainability conferences across the world.

Ghosh’s body of work has been profiled across leading broadsheets including Time Magazine, The New York Times, Los Angeles Times, The Guardian and also curated and exhibited by global forums such as the United Nations Climate Change Conference and Lincoln Center for Performing Arts.

Ghosh is known for centering the power of non-fiction films in designing and leading successful impact campaigns for organisations including the MacArthur Foundation, National Liver Foundation, Friendicoes, UNICEF, Public Health Foundation of India which have resulted in policy level changes in the spheres of public health, human rights and access to education in South and South East Asia.

Ghosh serves as an advisor and juror for several global film festivals and fellowships including the Zurich Film Festival, Movies That Matter Film Festival and a Chair for the International Documentary Association Awards. He is a board member for the Omega Resilience Awards, which supports the work of emerging Global South leaders in finding innovative solutions to the global polycrisis.

Ghosh’s debut feature-length documentary Writing With Fire premiered in 2021 at the Sundance Film Festival's World Cinema Documentary Competition, where it won two awards. One of the first reviews was The Washington Post describing it as “The most inspiring journalism movie – maybe ever”. The New York Times called it "nothing short of galvanizing". The Hollywood Reporter called it “insightful and inspirational” and the Financial Times in its review said, “Writing with Fire is a genre-defying masterpiece, one moment reminiscent of a dogged detective movie, the next recalling the great surround-sound reportage of Tom Wolfe and Joan Didion in the 1960s”.

Ghosh and co-director Rintu Thomas became the first Indian filmmakers to win a Peabody Award for Writing With Fire. The jury described their work as one of “the most compelling and empowering stories released in 2022 across broadcasting and streaming media”. A New York Times Critics’ Pick, the film also was nominated for Best Documentary Feature at the Grierson Awards, International Documentary Association Awards and Producers Guild of America Awards. Along with winning 40 awards, Writing With Fire become the first Indian first documentary to be nominated for an Academy Award. In India, the film premiered at the Dharamshala International Film Festival in November, 2022.

Following the New York premiere of the documentary at Doc NYC in November 2021, the documentary had a theatrical release in the United States, with the opening weekend at the Film Forum in New York. In August 2023, it had a theatrical release in Japan, across 50 Japanese theatres in 22 prefectures.

== Filmography ==
Year	Title	Worked as
2007	Bullets and Butterflies	Director, Cinematographer, Editor
2010	In Search of My Home	Director, Cinematographer, Producer
2011	Dilli	Director, Cinematographer, Producer
2012	Timbaktu	Director, Cinematographer, Producer
2021	Writing with Fire	Director, Cinematographer, Editor
