= Kavita Devi (journalist) =

Indian journalist

Kavita Bundelkhandi
- Born: Kavita Devi; Kunjan Purwa, Chitrakoot district, Uttar Pradesh, India
- Occupations: Editor-in-Chief and News Anchor at Khabar Lahariya
- Awards: Chameli Devi Jain Award for Outstanding Women Mediapersons (collective)

Kavita Devi, alternatively Kavita Bundelkhandi, is an Indian journalist and news presenter. She is the editor-in-chief and co-founder of the grassroots feminist news network Khabar Lahariya. Devi was notably the first Dalit ("untouchable") to become a member of the Editor's Guild of India.

== Biography ==
Kavita Devi was born in the remote village of Kunjan Purwa, near Banda, Uttar Pradesh, to a family of Dalit farmers. The eldest among six children, she was married off at the age of 12 and received no formal education. In her testimony, Devi states that a non-government organisation (NGO) had opened a center in her village where she studied extensively for six months, and after substantial resistance from other villagers including her family. She is noted to have been the first woman from her village to have received an education as a result. In later years, she has gone on to complete her graduation and earned a Master of Arts in journalism.

Devi states that she started working with a small newsletter Mahila Dakiya, which was run by the center in her village and marked the beginning of her journalistic career. Eventually in 2002, she co-founded Khabar Lahariya along with seven other women, with the support an NGO called Nirantar, and funding from the Dorabji Tata Trust, the National Foundation of India and the Dalit Foundation. In 2004, the journalists at the paper collectively became the recipient of the Chameli Devi Jain Award for Outstanding Women Mediapersons. By 2014, the paper had six editions and journalist staff of around 40 women. It was described by Business Standard, as having become the backbone of the people in the impoverished rural regions of Bundelkhand and Awadh, in the states of Uttar Pradesh and Bihar.

Over time, Devi has served in a number of positions in the organisation such as the editor of the Banda edition, the head of digital operations, and initially as a solo field journalist. She also runs a weekly news commentary show called The Kavita Show on the network and has been the editor-in-chief since 2019. In the same year, she appeared as a speaker at a TED conference which resulted in widespread attention on her story, and was described by the host and actor Shah Rukh Khan as an inspiration.
