= Jeff Orlowski =

American filmmaker

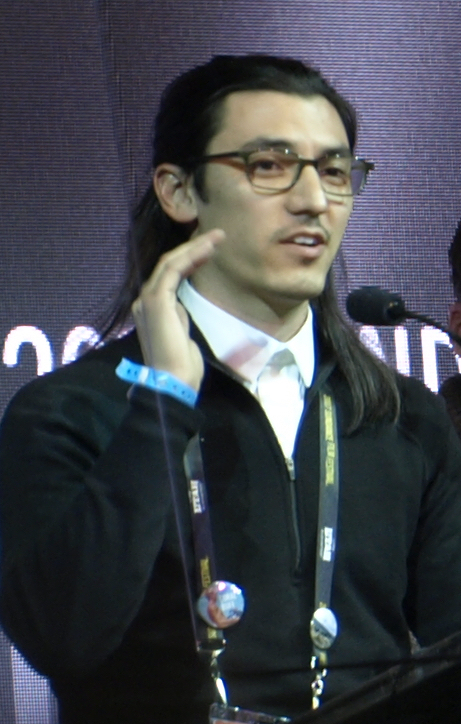
Orlowski-Yang, receiving an Audience Award for Chasing Coral at the 2017 Sundance Film Festival

Jeff Orlowski-Yang is an American filmmaker. He is best known for both directing and producing the Emmy Award-winning documentary Chasing Ice (2012) and Chasing Coral (2017) and for directing The Social Dilemma about the damaging societal impact of social media.

== Life and career ==
Born and raised in Staten Island, New York, Orlowski-Yang attended Stuyvesant High School where he served as editor-in-chief of the student newspaper, The Spectator.

At the age of 18, Orlowski-Yang moved to California to study anthropology at Stanford University. In his senior year at Stanford, he joined environmental photographer James Balog's Extreme Ice Survey, a time-lapse photography project monitoring glacier retreat around the world. Hired first as the team's videographer, he eventually went on to direct the documentary Chasing Ice based on Balog's work.

The feature-length documentary received international acclaim, screening on all seven continents and capturing more than 40 awards from film festivals around the world. Chasing Ice also received a 2014 Emmy Award for Outstanding Nature Programming; the Sundance Film Festival Excellence in Cinematography Award for U.S. Documentary; an Academy Award nomination for Best Original Song "Before My Time;" and a 2016 Doc Impact Award honoring documentary films that have made the greatest impact on society.

In 2009, Orlowski-Yang founded Exposure Labs, a production company geared toward socially relevant filmmaking. In 2015, he produced the film Frame by Frame, which premiered at South by Southwest and tells the story of four Afghan photojournalists working to build a free press following decades of war and an oppressive Taliban regime.

In January 2016, Orlowski-Yang received the inaugural Sundance Institute | Discovery Impact Fellowship for environmental filmmaking.

In 2017, Orlowski-Yang released Chasing Coral, a feature-length film on the rapid changes occurring to the world's coral reefs. The film won a 2018 Peabody Award.

In 2020, Orlowski-Yang directed The Social Dilemma in collaboration with the Center for Humane Technology about the damaging societal impact of social media.

== Chasing Ice ==
Chasing Ice is a 2012 documentary chronicling environmental photographer James Balog's quest to capture images, through the Extreme Ice Survey, a long-term photography project monitoring 24 of the world's glaciers through 43 time-lapse cameras, that will help tell the story of the changes in Earth's climate brought on by global warming.

The documentary includes scenes from a glacier calving event that took place at Jakobshavn Glacier in Greenland, lasting 75 minutes, the longest such event ever captured on film according to the Guinness Book of World Records.

Huffington Post called the documentary "one of the most beautiful and important films ever made" and Roger Ebert wrote: "At a time when warnings of global warming were being dismissed by broadcast blabbermouths as "junk science," the science here is based on actual observation of the results as they happen. When opponents of the theory of evolution say (incorrectly) that no one has ever seen evolution happening, scientists are seeing climate change happening right now — and with alarming speed. Here is a film for skeptics who say "we don’t have enough information."

== Filmography ==
- Chasing Time (director) (2024)
- The Social Dilemma (director) (2020)
- Chasing Coral (director) (2017)
- Frame by Frame (producer) (2015)
- Bad Kid (producer) (2013)
- Chasing Ice (director and producer) (2012)
- The Strange Case of Salman abd al Haqq (director and producer) (2007)
- Geocaching: From the Web to the Woods (director and producer) (2006)

== Awards ==
- Jeff Orlowski is the recipient of the Lifetime Achievement Award (Champions of the Earth) in 2017.
