= James Balog =

American photographer

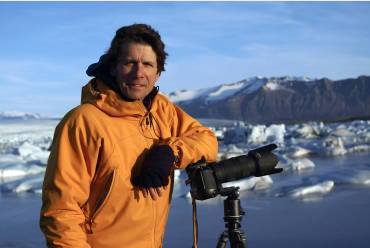
- Born: July 15, 1952 (age 74); Danville, Pennsylvania, U.S.
- Education: University of Colorado
- Occupation: Photographer
- Website: earthvisioninstitute.org

James Balog (born July 15, 1952) is an American photographer and the founder and director of Earth Vision Institute in Boulder, Colorado. In 2007, Balog founded the Extreme Ice Survey, a project that documents glacial melting.

Balog has photographed subjects such as endangered animals, North America's old-growth forests, and polar ice. In 1996, Balog was commissioned by the U.S. Postal Service to create a complete set of stamps. In 2024, Balog received an Honorary Fellowship from The Royal Photographic Society.

He is a senior Fellow of the International League of Conservation Photographers.

== Early life and education ==
Balog was born in Danville, Pennsylvania. He has participated in climbing expeditions in the Alps and Himalayas, and completed first ascents in Alaska.

While working on a master's degree in geomorphology at the University of Colorado, he developed his photography skills during frequent climbing trips. These trips inspired him to abandon his scientific studies to pursue nature photojournalism. He began with a series of documentary photography assignments for magazines such as Mariah (the predecessor to Outside), Smithsonian, and National Geographic. Later, he moved into self-directed projects, many of which would ultimately lead to large-format photography books.

== Extreme Ice Survey ==
In 2007, Balog initiated the Extreme Ice Survey, the most wide-ranging ground-based photographic glacier study ever conducted. National Geographic magazine showcased Balog's ice work in June 2007 and June 2010, and the project is featured in the 2009 NOVA documentary Extreme Ice as well as the 75-minute film Chasing Ice (which premiered in January 2012).

== Documentary films ==
Balog's efforts to publicize the effects of climate change were the subject of the 2012 documentary film Chasing Ice, directed by Jeff Orlowski. The documentary includes scenes from a glacier calving event that took place at Jakobshavn Glacier in Greenland, which lasted 75 minutes, the longest such event ever captured on film. Two EIS videographers waited several weeks in a small tent overlooking the glacier and witnessed 7.4 cubic kilometres (1.8 cu mi) of ice crashing off the glacier. The film received the 2014 News and Documentary Emmy Award for Outstanding Nature Programming.

Balog's feature-length documentary The Human Element, exploring the effects of humans on the environment, premiered at San Francisco Green Film Festival in 2018.

Chasing Time, a 2024 American documentary short film directed by the first time filmmaker Sarah Keo and Jeff Orlowski, offers a reflective examination of time and mortality as it follows Balog and his team during the final phase of a multi‑decade project that has produced more than one million images. The short documentary also reunites Balog with the Emmy Award-winning team behind Chasing Ice.

== Bibliography ==
- The Human Element: A Time Capsule from the Anthropocene, (Rizzoli, 2021) ISBN 084787088X
- Wildlife Requiem (International Center of Photography, New York, 1984) ISBN 0-933642-06-7
- Ice: Portraits of the World's Vanishing Glaciers (Rizzoli, 2012) ISBN 978-0847838868
- Extreme Ice Now: Vanishing Glaciers and Changing Climate: A Progress Report (National Geographic Books, Washington DC, 2009) ISBN 978-1-4262-0401-2
- Tree: A New Vision of the American Forest (Barnes & Noble Books, New York, 2004) ISBN 978-1-4027-2818-1
- Animal (Graphis, New York, 1999) ISBN 978-1-888001-80-8
- James Balog’s Animals A to Z (Chronicle, San Francisco, 1996) ISBN 978-0-8118-1339-6
- Anima (Arts Alternative Press, Boulder, Colo., 1993) ISBN 0-9636266-0-4
- Survivors: A New Vision of Endangered Wildlife (Harry N. Abrams, New York, 1990) ISBN 0-8109-3908-8

== See also ==
- Conservation photography
