= Khabar Lahariya =

Indian news website

- Type: Rural Weekly Newspaper
- Format: Broadsheet
- Founder(s): Kavita Devi; Meera Jatav
- Editor-in-chief: Kavita Devi
- Founded: 30 May 2002 in Chitrakoot, Uttar Pradesh, India
- Language: Multiple editions in Hindustani dialects such as Bundeli, Bhojpuri, Awadhi, Bajjikka, etc English
- Headquarters: Karwi, Chitrakoot, Uttar Pradesh
- Circulation: 6000 copies with a claimed readership of 20,000 (2012)
- Website: www.khabarlahariya.org

Khabar Lahariya (translation: News Wave) is an Indian newspaper, published in various rural dialects of Hindi, including Bundeli, Avadhi and Bajjika dialects. The newspaper was started by Nirantar, a New Delhi–based non-government organisation which focuses on gender and education. Initially seen as a women-only publication, it now covers local political news, local crime reports, social issues and entertainment, all reported from a feminist perspective. As of September 2012, its total print-run, all editions included, was around 6000 copies; the management claimed an estimated readership of 80,000. Since its digitalisation its outreach has massively extended.

== Circulation and reach ==
Established in 2002, Khabar Lahariya is an eight-page weekly local newspaper founded by Kavita Devi (CEO) and Meera Devi (Managing Editor). The inaugural issue of the newspaper was published in May 2002 from the town of Karwi in Chitrakoot district of Uttar Pradesh, in the local Bundeli dialect of Hindi. In 2012, the newspaper launched editions from Mahoba, Lucknow, and Varanasi districts of Uttar Pradesh in Bundeli, Awadhi, and Bhojpuri dialects, respectively. The newspaper also publishes an edition from the Sitamarhi district of Bihar in Bajjikka dialect and from Banda, Uttar Pradesh, in the Bundeli dialect. As of September 2012, its total print run, including all editions, was approximately 6,000 copies sold in approximately 600 villages in Uttar Pradesh and Bihar. The newspaper has an estimated readership of 20,000.

Khabar Lahariya’s website was launched on February 13, 2013, in Mumbai. The website, which closely resembles the printed newspaper, curates and republishes the most noteworthy articles from the newspaper. Notably, it is the sole website where content is accessible in the local dialects in which the newspaper is published. Additionally, some stories on the website are now available in English.

Starting in 2016, the newspaper shifted largely to a digital format launching a video channel and creating news in video clips. The women journalists collective now runs a digital media agency covering stories from rural India, mostly from the state of Uttar Pradesh. As a result of digitalisation, the news outlet has substantially increased its reach. Owing to the support of the readers' community, Khabar Lahariya grew from a local newspaper in 2002 to publishing their own website in 2013, and launching their own subscription model, Sound, Fury and 4G in 2019.

In 2026, ten of the outlet's journalists and staff co-wrote The Good Reporter, a collective biography and memoir detailing the history of the newsroom and rural, feminist journalism in India.

== Distinctive features ==
The intellectual input for the newspaper is provided by a collective of 40 rural women journalists. The newspaper is written, edited, produced, distributed and marketed entirely by rural women from disadvantaged communities (Scheduled Castes and Scheduled Tribes, Dalits and Muslims). The women who report the stories also edit, produce, distribute and market the newspaper. Meera Jatav is the Editor-in-Chief and has been working from Karwi since the newspaper was started in 2002. The newspaper specialises in exposing local scandals. It mainly carries local news that, although primarily of interest to its rural readership, has wider resonance nationally and internationally. Examples are reports on violence against women, discrimination against Dalits, deaths in illegal mining operations, and the rise of Hindu nationalism.

== Awards and recognition ==
In 2004, the collective of women journalists bringing out Khabar Lahariya was awarded the prestigious Chameli Devi Jain Award for Women in Journalism. In 2009, the newspaper was awarded the UNESCO King Sejong Literacy Prize. Following this, plans to expand the newspaper were made. In 2012, the newspaper went on to win the Laadli Media Award for gender sensitive reporting. Also, in the same year the Indian news channel Times Now awarded Khabar Lahariya the Amazing Indian Award. In 2013 the newspaper was presented with the Kaifi Azmi Award in memory of poet Kaifi Azmi. The award is presented by the All India Kaifi Azmi Academy every year on the anniversary of his death.

In 2014, German media channel Deutsche Welle awarded the prestigious Global Media Forum Award to the newspaper's website at the Best of Blogs annual conference held in Bonn in Germany.

An Indian documentary film about the newspaper titled Writing with Fire was released in 2021. It has won numerous international awards, including some at the 2021 Sundance Film Festival, and was nominated for the Academy Award for Best Documentary Feature at the 94th Academy Awards. The publication also won a Courage Award from the International Women's Media Foundation in June for how it "disrupts and interrogates the status quo, where newsmakers have long been male, upper-caste, and politically connected".
