= Jean Dominique =

Haitian journalist

Jean L. Dominique
- Born: Jean Leopold Dominique; 31 July 1930; Port-au-Prince, Haiti
- Died: 3 April 2000 (aged 69); Port-au-Prince, Haiti
- Cause of death: Gunshot wounds
- Occupations: Journalist; activist; agronomist
- Years active: 1955–2000
- Known for: Human rights activism
- Spouse: Michèle Montas (m. 1983)

Jean Léopold Dominique (31 July 1930 – 3 April 2000) was a Haitian journalist and activist for human rights and democracy in Haiti. His station, Radio Haiti-Inter, was the first to broadcast news, investigative reporting, and political analysis in Haitian Creole, the language spoken by most Haitian people. On 3 April 2000 he was assassinated as he arrived for work at Radio Haiti-Inter. An extensive though turbulent investigation failed to officially identify and bring to justice the primary perpetrators, who remain at large.

== Personal life and early career ==
Jean Dominique was born in Port-au-Prince to Léopold Dominique, a trader originally from Rivière Froide, and Marcelle (Pereira) Dominique. As a child, Dominique frequently accompanied his father on trips throughout the Haitian countryside, which led him to know and understand the lives and struggles of peasant farmers. Dominique's elder brother Philippe was an officer in the Haitian army who, along with fellow officers Alix Pasquet and Henry Perpignan, was killed in an attempt to occupy the Casernes Dessalines and overthrow François Duvalier in July 1958. His eldest sister, Madeleine Dominique Paillère, was a well-known author and intellectual.

After completing his primary and secondary schooling at Institution Saint-Louis de Gonzague, Dominique studied at the Faculté d’Agronomie in Port-au-Prince, graduating in 1951. In the 1950s he continued his training at the Institut national agronomique (INA) in Paris, where he also developed an interest in cinema as a political tool. He returned to Haiti in 1955 and began work as an agronomist in the Nord department with the Institut Haïtien de Crédit Agricole et Industriel as well as the Société Haitiano-Américaine de Développement Agricole (SHADA), primarily on sisal and rubber production.

In the early 1960s, after his release from prison, Dominique went to work as a program host and cultural commentator at Haiti's first independent radio station, Radio Haïti, interviewing writers and scholars. In 1972, he purchased the lease to the station from Ricardo Widmaïer and renamed it Radio Haiti-Inter. It was the first radio station in Haiti to broadcast political analysis, interviews, and investigative reporting in Haitian Creole, the language spoken by the entire population of Haiti, in addition to French, which was the language of the ruling elite.

During the 1960s, Dominique also founded Haiti's first film club at the Institut Français in Port-au-Prince, which he understood to be a way of subverting and resisting the political repression of the Duvalier dictatorship. In 1965, the film club was banned following a screening of Alain Resnais's Night and Fog, an anti-fascist film about the Nazi concentration camps. In 1961, Dominique co-directed and narrated Haiti's first documentary film, Mais, je suis belle (But, I Am Beautiful), an ironic film about Caribbean beauty pageants. Dominique remained a staunch supporter of Haitian cinema, and collaborated with Haitian filmmakers such as Rassoul Labuchin.

Dominique was married to fellow journalist Michèle Montas, who became the co-director of Radio Haiti after his assassination. He had three daughters from previous marriages — the writer Jan J. (J.J.) Dominique, Nadine Dominique, and Dolores Dominique Neptune — and one son, Denis Boucolon. While studying in Paris, Dominique had a relationship with Guadeloupean student Maryse Boucolon, later known as the novelist Maryse Condé. Their son, Denis, was born in France.

== Career at Radio Haïti-Inter ==
=== 1971–1980 ===
Throughout the 1970s, Jean Dominique used Radio Haiti to highlights aspects of Haitian culture rooted in its Creole-speaking majority and repressed for almost two centuries by its French-speaking elite. Dominique and Radio Haiti also reported increasingly on events that would challenge the regime of Jean-Claude Duvalier, often strategically and indirectly to circumvent the regime's censorship laws. For example, Radio Haiti reported in 1972 for weeks, on the fall of the dictator of Nicaragua, Anastasio "Tachito" Somoza Debayle, as a proxy for talking about Duvalier. In 1973 and 1976, Dominique reported from the annual Vodou pilgrimage at Saut-d’Eau on worshippers’ lamentations and entreaties to the spirits: an implicit way of talking about peasant resistance : “We were under Jean-Claude Duvalier, we were under [high-ranking Macoutes like] Luc Désir, Jean Valmé, Luckner Cambronne, and company We were under the tigers!” Dominique later explained. “The people opened their arms in front of the pilgrimage site, they looked toward the church, and they described their misery. They described their oppression, how the life was squeezed out of them [peze-souse]. They described how everything was being destroyed [kraze-brize]. They spelled it all out. They described it in a litany, for hours. For days.”

As the Haitian government relied on assistance from the United States, Duvalier had little choice but to comply with certain human rights rules and principles while Jimmy Carter was president. However, as Carter's term came to an end, Duvalier's opposition to the free press became more pronounced. In October 1980, he announced that le bal est fini (the party is over) for the independent press. Dominique, reading the writing on the wall, responded with one of his most famous editorials, entitled “Bon appétit, messieurs,” addressed to the journalists of the state press. “For you, the banquet shall resume. And you will not hear any discordant sounds, any noise that might disturb your appetites. You will not be distracted from your plentiful feast by the cries of the poor, the screams of the boat people devoured by sharks, the gunshots killing our cane-cutter brothers in Santo Domingo or in Nassau or La Romana... No, you will not hear those discordant, disagreeable noises that might trouble your meal, that might prevent you from celebrating -- it will be only silence... So you may celebrate at ease, gentlemen! At ease! And in that profound silence: Bon appétit, messieurs!”

On 28 November 1980, shortly after Ronald Reagan won the US presidential election, Duvalier cracked down on the independent press, human rights activists, and union leaders in Haiti. Duvalier's militia, the Tontons Macoutes, ransacked and destroyed Radio Haiti's studios. Nearly all of Radio Haiti's journalists were arrested; some, including station manager Richard Brisson, were tortured. Most were released within days and then exiled. An order was issued for Jean Dominique to be killed on sight. He spent two months in asylum at the Venezuelan embassy, before he joined Montas in New York, where they married in 1983.

=== 1986–1991 ===
On 5 March 1986, less than a month after Duvalier's ouster, Dominique and Montas returned to Haiti, and were greeted at the airport by nearly 60,000 people. That October, Radio Haiti reopened with funds raised by ordinary Haitian people.

Through the late 1980s, as Haiti endured successive military coups d’état, Dominique continued to advocate for democratic participation, human rights, peasant rights, and for the removal of Duvalierist and Macoute elements from the government and the army. He devoted a great deal of airtime and analysis, for example, to the July 1987 massacre of peasant farmers by landowners and Macoutes in Jean Rabel. Haiti's first democratic elections were scheduled for 29 November 1987, but were violently suppressed by the army, which slaughtered voters at Ruelle Vaillant and destroyed electoral bureaus throughout the country. Radio Haiti came under armed attack that day, as ordered by Williams Régala; Dominique and the other journalists stood on the roof throwing rocks and bottles as the army fired machine guns and grenades.

Dominique was an early supporter of the Lavalas movement and Jean-Bertrand Aristide, the parish priest and outspoken proponent of liberation theology. Radio Haiti covered the 11 September 1988 massacre in which attachés under the orders of Port-au-Prince mayor Franck Romain massacred parishioners at Aristide's St. Jean Bosco church, and interviewed Aristide several times as a priest and as a presidential candidate, and, finally, after his victory in Haiti's first democratic elections in December 1990.

When the military under Raoul Cédras overthrew the government of Jean-Bertrand Aristide in September 1991, Radio Haiti once more had to close and Dominique and Montas again went into exile in New York. During these years, Dominique published op eds and appeared on the Charlie Rose show to encourage a return to constitutional order in Haiti. He also collaborated with the American filmmaker Jonathan Demme on the interviews that would eventually become the documentary The Agronomist, and on an unfinished project on the History of Haitian Cinema. In June 1993, Dominique was part of Aristide's entourage at the Governors Island meeting between the democratically elected government in exile and the leaders of the military junta. Dominique returned to Haiti in 1994, after Aristide's return to power, and reopened Radio Haiti the following year.

=== 1995–2000 ===
In the final years of his life, Dominique concentrated on issues of state corruption and criminal negligence by the private sector. He investigated Pharval Laboratories, a pharmaceutical company, for selling cough syrup contaminated with diethylene glycol that was responsible for the poisoning of two hundred children, of whom sixty died. He also denounced the importation of medical-grade ethanol that was being sold as counterfeit clairin (high-proof undistilled sugar cane spirits), sickening and killing people who consumed it while undercutting the livelihood of Haiti's sugar planters and distillers.

As a journalist who emphasized his own political objectivity and that of his staff, Dominique took pains to remain nonpartisan in his professional activities. He did, however, strongly support grassroots peasants’ rights groups, especially KOZEPEP whose leader, Charles Suffrard, was a close friend and collaborator of Dominique. Though as a private citizen Dominique was an early supporter of the Lavalas movement, he later investigated Aristide and other members of Fanmi Lavalas for corruption and misappropriation of government funds, and for betraying the promise of the twa wòch dife, the three cornerstones of the Lavalas movement: participation, justice, and transparency.

In a tense 16 December 1996 Face à l’Opinion interview, Dominique questioned Aristide about state corruption, particularly in his petits projets de la présidence. Dominique also took on former police chief, Dany Toussaint, for attempting to take control of the country's security apparatus after the assassination of his rival for the position of Secretary of State for Public Security, Jean Lamy. As a result of this, Toussaint's supporters surrounded and attacked the radio station building.

In February 2000, Toussaint's lawyers Gérard Georges and Jean-Claude Nord openly made death threats against Jean Dominique and Michèle Montas on the airwaves of Serge Beaulieu's New York-based Duvalierist radio station Radio Liberté. This led Dominique to declare in an October 1999 editorial, “I know that [Toussaint] has the money to pay and arm his followers. Here, I have no other weapon than my journalist's pen! And my microphone and my unquenchable faith as a militant for true change!... If Dany Toussaint tries anything else against me or the station, and if I am still alive, I will close the place down after I have denounced these maneuvers one more time and I will go in exile once more with my wife and children.”

== Assassination and investigation ==
On 3 April 2000, at the age of 69, Dominique was shot four times in the chest and neck as he arrived for work at Radio Haïti. A station employee named Jean-Claude Louissaint was also killed in the attack. President René Préval ordered three days of official mourning, and 15,000 people, among them 10,000 peasant farmers, attended the joint funeral at Stade Sylvio Cator in downtown Port-au-Prince on 8 April. On 15 April, more than 5,000 peasant farmers from the Artibonite gathered in Pont-Sondé to pay tribute, and the following day, Dominique's ashes were poured into the Artibonite River at Passe Caneau, so that, in the words of Charles Suffrard, Dominique could continue to nourish each grain of rice the river reached.

In the years following Dominique's assassination, civil society and grassroots groups in Haiti held large public protests and sit-ins calling for justice for Dominique and Louissaint. International human rights organizations, including Amnesty International and Reporters Without Borders, launched years-long campaigns demanding justice for Jean Dominique.

There have been several obstructions and irregularities in the investigation into the murders, originating in the police, parliament, and the executive branch. In 2000, supporters of chief suspect Dany Toussaint, some of them armed, threatened to set fire to the courthouse, and in 2001, Toussaint (then a sitting senator for the Fanmi Lavalas party) claimed parliamentary immunity from appearing in court, which the senate refused to revoke. The president of the Senate, Yvon Neptune, pronounced that a “little judge” could not summon a senator. The Minister of Justice at the time, Gary Lissade, had previously been Dany Toussaint's attorney. The first judge in the Jean Dominique case, Claudy Gassant, was subject to repeated threats to his safety, and in 2002, Aristide refused to renew his mandate. In March 2003, Judge Bernard Saint-Vil concluded that a small group of low-level criminals were responsible for the murder, but that there was insufficient evidence to indict Dany Toussaint—findings that Dominique's widow Michèle Montas contested in an appellate court, demanding that the intellectual authors of the crime be found and punished. In December 2004, more than 75% of documents relating to the investigation disappeared from the Cour de Cassation (Haiti's Supreme Court). In addition, several suspects and witnesses died under mysterious circumstances.

In 2014, nine individuals with close links to former president Jean-Betrand Aristide, including former Fanmi Lavalas senator Mirlande Libérus, were charged in Haiti with having had a hand in the killing. Most recently, in March 2015 Aristide's former chief of security Oriel Jean was gunned down by unknown assailants, after which journalist Guy Delva released an interview in which Jean suggested that Aristide had ordered Dominique's assassination.

On Christmas Day 2002, there was an attempt on Michèle Montas's life in which her bodyguard, Maxime Seïde, was murdered. Amid increasing threats to the safety of Radio Haïti's journalists, the station closed for good in February 2003.

== Legacy ==
Jonathan Demme covered the life and death of Dominique in his 2003 documentary The Agronomist.

The Centre de Production Agricole Jean L. Dominique in Marmelade, in the north of Haiti, created in 2001 by former President René Preval in memory of Dominique, is an agricultural training center for coffee and cacao producers. A reforestation hub, it is also home to a cooperative of citrus growers, with a juice processing plant, while the bamboo trees on the grounds are used for the production of furniture.

The archives of Radio Haiti-Inter are currently being processed by the Rubenstein Rare Book & Manuscript Library at Duke University, with the goal of preserving, digitizing, and digitally repatriating Radio Haiti's recordings to Haiti. Dominique’s daughter, writer Jan J. Dominique, later explored the aftermath of his death and exile in her autobiographical novel Mémoire errante — 2008.

== See also ==
- List of assassinations
- List of unsolved murders (2000–present)
