= Chasing Time (TV series) =

British television series

- Genre: Reality/Documentary
- Directed by: Simon Howley; Iain MacDonald
- Presented by: Trey Farley
- Country of origin: United Kingdom

Production
- Executive producers: Jennifer Apostol; Brian Waddell
- Producers: Brian Waddell Productions Limited; National Geographic
- Running time: 30 minutes

Chasing Time is a reality television and documentary show screened in the United Kingdom from 2001 to 2003. It was akin to a game show in a race format where a team of two related people completed a series of challenges in a major world city in a limited period of time. The show is also named Chasing Time In with some sources. Trey Farley hosted the show.

== Production ==
Bryan Smith, a commissioning editor at National Geographic Channels International, enlisted Brian Waddell Productions to create Chasing Time. Jon-Barrie Waddell is the show's producer, David Cummings is the editor, while Simon Howley and Iain MacDonald directed the show. Jennifer Apostol and Brian Waddell served as the show's executive producers. Trey Farley hosted the show.

== Premise ==
The premise was similar to The Amazing Race, except the one team completed all challenges in one world city completely unknown to them. The time limit was typically 12 hours for all tasks, but each task also had its own time limit. Teams were equipped with a map, a phrase book, a cell phone, and a camera. Winners received a five-day vacation, while the defeated returned to the United Kingdom.

== Production ==
Chasing Time was produced by Brian Waddell Productions, a Northern Ireland firm, and Jon-Barrie Waddell. There were eight 30-minute episodes. It was a finalist for the New York Festivals's International Television Programming and Promotion awards. Filming for the Singapore episode took four days.

Cities in which the episodes were filmed included Sydney, Australia; Shanghai, China; Rome, Italy; Lisbon, Portugal; Singapore; and Istanbul, Turkey.

== Reception ==
Pam Brown of The West Australian called the show "to some degree contrived", citing how a Sydney episode in which the contestants needed to pose for a photograph at height of 134 metres (440 ft) overlooking Sydney Harbour Bridge before the deadline, which is fewer than two hours away. She said "the only trouble" was that BridgeClimb Sydney tours take three hours to make a roundtrip. The Australian television critic Kerrie Murphy praised the Trey Farley for "mov[ing] proceedings along" and "look[ing] pretty spunky while doing so". The Age's Barbara Hooks praised the contestants of the Shanghai episode, saying, "They set such a cracking pace solving the cryptic clues, you see quite a lot of the city." She called the Istanbul episode "positively Byzantine" when the contestants and the city's inhabitants appear to be just as confused. Bruce Elder of The Sydney Morning Herald said the Sydney episode gave "an interesting and fresh view" of the city.
