= Michèle Montas =

Haitian journalist and writer

Spokesperson to the Secretary-General of the United Nations
- In office January 1, 2007 – January 1, 2010
- Preceded by: Stéphane Dujarric de la Rivière
- Succeeded by: Martin Nesirky

Head of French UN Radio

Spokesperson for the President of the General Assembly
- In office 2003–2004

Personal details
- Born: 1946 (age 79–80) Port-au-Prince, Haiti

Michèle Montas (born 1946) is a journalist from Haiti and the former Spokesperson under UN Secretary-General Ban Ki-moon (January 1, 2007 – January 1, 2010). Prior to her appointment, Montas headed the French unit of UN Radio. From 2003 to 2004, she served as the Spokesperson for UN General Assembly President Julian Robert Hunte soon after she fled to New York from Haiti.

Montas began her journalism career in Haiti in the early 1970s with her husband, Jean Dominique, also a Haitian journalist. Dominique's station, Radio Haiti-Inter, was attacked several times in the 1980s and 1990s, and the couple was forced to flee the country twice to briefly live in exile. Dominique was assassinated in April 2000 after broadcasting increasingly strident criticisms of Jean-Bertrand Aristide's party on his program (Aristide was not in power at the time). Montas took over the radio station, but shut it down in February 2003 and fled to New York after her bodyguard was gunned down in an attack on her home and she received several death threats. Montas returned to Haiti in 2010 in her role with MINUSTAH.
