= Radio Haiti-Inter =

First independent radio station in Haiti

Radio Haiti-Inter was the first independent radio station in Haiti. The station was notable for its use of the Haitian Creole language, spoken by most Haitians, while most other media broadcast in French, and also for its broadcasting of international and local news.

== History ==
The station was founded as Radio Haiti and was broadcast on both AM and FM and later renamed to Radio Haiti-Inter. Jean Dominique, who started working at the station as a reporter, bought the lease to the station in 1968. The station was the target of various attacks by oppressive government regimes throughout its history, due to the democratic and anti-corruption stance of Dominique.

In 1980 the Haitian regime closed the station and arrested some station journalists, and Dominique was forced into exile. The station resumed its activity in 1986 after the fall of Jean-Claude Duvalier, but closed again in 1991 after the coup d'état against Jean-Bertrand Aristide. The station reopened in 1994 after Aristide's return.

Jean Dominique was assassinated on April 3, 2000, upon attempting to enter the station. A station employee Jean-Claude Louissaint was also killed in the attack. The station continued to broadcast for 3 years after Dominique's death, helmed by his wife Michèle Montas. Radio Haiti-Inter ended broadcasting in 2003, due to threats against Montas and other employees.

The station and the story of its founder was documented in Jonathan Demme's film The Agronomist.

== See also ==
- List of unsolved deaths
- Media of Haiti
