= Writing with Fire =

Indian 2021 documentary film about journalists

Writing With Fire
- Directed by: Sushmit Ghosh; Rintu Thomas
- Produced by: Sushmit Ghosh; Rintu Thomas
- Cinematography: Sushmit Ghosh; Karan Thapliyal
- Edited by: Sushmit Ghosh; Rintu Thomas; Anne Fabini (supervising editor)
- Music by: Tajdar Junaid; Ishaan Chhabra
- Production company: Black Ticket Films
- Distributed by: Music Box Films (United States)
- Release date: 30 January 2021 (Sundance)
- Running time: 94 minutes
- Country: India
- Language: Hindi
- Box office: ₹ 16.58 lakh ($29,731)

Writing with Fire is a 2021 Indian documentary film directed by filmmakers Sushmit Ghosh and Rintu Thomas about the journalists running the Dalit women led newspaper Khabar Lahariya, as they shift from 14-years of print to digital journalism using smartphones. It is the first Indian feature documentary to be nominated for an Academy Award for Best Documentary Feature.

Produced under Ghosh and Thomas' Black Ticket Films banner, the film had its world premiere at the 2021 Sundance Film Festival, where it won two awards, the Audience Award and a Special Jury Award in the World Cinema Documentary category. It received unanimous acclaim from film festivals and critics, winning several international awards and critical acclaim from the press. It was named a "Critics Pick" by The New York Times, and Jason Rezaian at The Washington Post called it "the most inspiring journalism movie — maybe ever". In 2023, Writing With Fire won a Peabody Award for Best Documentary Film, making Rintu and Sushmit the first Indian filmmakers in the award's 83-year history to win this recognition.

== Synopsis ==
Writing with Fire tells the story of Khabar Lahariya, the only news agency in India run by Dalit (oppressed-caste) women. Armed with smartphones, these women journalists report from some of the most difficult regions of the country, risking everything to speak truth to power. Under the leadership of Chief Reporter Meera and her spirited protégé, crime reporter Suneeta, the film showcases the sharpness, intellect, and empathy of these journalists as they tackle the most pressing stories of our era.

Set in the backdrop of an increasingly polarized world, Writing with Fire journeys with Meera and her band of sisters for five years - as they break traditions on the frontlines of India's biggest issues and within the confines of their homes, redefining what it truly means to be powerful.

== Release ==
Writing With Fire had its theatrical opening in November 2021 in New York (Film Forum), Los Angeles (Laemmle Royal), Chicago (Gene Siskel Film Center) and Austin (Austin Film Society)- making it the first Indian documentary film to have a US theatrical release. With the overwhelmingly positive critics reviews and audience response to the film’s opening week, screenings expanded to more cities across the US. Also in the United States, Writing With Fire was also released on 28 March 2022, part of the Independent Lens series on PBS.

== Reception ==
=== Critical reception ===
The film has garnered a 100% score on Rotten Tomatoes from critics based on 51 reviews, with an average rating of 8.40/10. The site's critical consensus reads, "Writing with Fire pays stirring tribute to the power of journalism -- and presents a chilling glimpse of the forces aligned against it." Metacritic, which uses a weighted average, assigned the film a score of 83 out of 100, based on 11 critics, indicating "universal acclaim".

Jessica Kiang from Variety reviewed the film as a "rousing, inspirational tribute to the pride of grassroots Indian journalism". Inkoo Kang at The Hollywood Reporter called the film "insightful and inspirational". while Kate Erbland at IndieWire reviewed it "profound". The Los Angeles Times called the film "a vital, stimulating dispatch from the frontlines of consequential citizen journalism" while the San Francisco Chronicle, giving the film a 5-star review, said "even Woodward and Bernstein would be inspired by the women reporters of India's Writing with Fire".

=== Reception by Khabar Lahariya journalists ===
The film and its impact was received positively by Kavita Devi, the co-founder of Khabar Lahariya, and various team members who appeared with the film at film festivals and conferences with the filmmakers over 14 months since its world premiere at Sundance. Meera Devi, the main protagonist of Writing With Fire and Managing Editor of the news outlet, described the impact of the film as "From a global perspective, we have become a lot more popular since the film came out [in Sundance]. Both personally and professionally, it has really amplified the newspaper and its work. We have witnessed a completely different kind of popularity – and that is really good." Describing the unique relevance of the film, filmmaker Shabani Hassanwalia, a board member of Khabar Lahariya wrote, "May this documentary, which follows three KL journalists through a critical phase of Khabar Lahariya’s evolution, be watched far and wide, and may it continue to do what great documentaries are made to do: bear witness to truths that help us see, for the first time." Over a year later, once the film was nominated for an Academy Award, the organisation issued a statement criticising the film for presenting a simplified, incomplete profile of their work and "consuming focus of reporting on one party", which NPR identified as the Bharatiya Janata Party (BJP), India's national ruling party. Srishti Mehra, outreach manager at Chambal Media, claimed that this "misrepresentation" could negatively affect the security and reputation of Khabar Lahariya and its journalists.

== Accolades ==
Following its release, Writing with Fire was showcased at numerous film festivals and won several awards, including the World Cinema Documentary Special Jury Award: Impact for Change and the World Cinema Documentary Competition Audience Award at the 2021 Sundance Film Festival. In December 2021, it was announced that the film had entered the shortlist of candidates for the Academy Award for Best Documentary Feature in the 94th Academy Awards in 2022, and the next February it was announced that it had been nominated in this category.

Award	Date of ceremony	Category	Recipient(s)	Result	Ref.
Academy Awards	27 March 2022	Best Documentary Feature	Rintu Thomas and Sushmit Ghosh	Nominated	
Asia Pacific Screen Awards	11 November 2021	Best Documentary Feature Film	Rintu Thomas and Sushmit Ghosh	Nominated	
Belfast Film Festival	13 November 2021	Maysles Brothers Award for Feature Documentary	Rintu Thomas and Sushmit Ghosh	Won	
Bergen International Film Festival	28 October 2021	Checkpoints Award for Best Human Rights Documentary	Rintu Thomas and Sushmit Ghosh	Won	
BlackStar Film Festival	9 August 2021	Best Documentary Feature	Writing with Fire	Won	
BlackStar Film Festival	9 August 2021	Audience Award – Best Documentary Feature	Writing with Fire	Won	
Cinema Eye Honors	1 March 2022	Audience Choice Prize	Rintu Thomas and Sushmit Ghosh	Nominated	
Cinema Eye Honors	1 March 2022	The Unforgettables	Meera Devi	Won	
Cinema for Peace Awards		Women's Empowerment	Writing with Fire	Won	
Dokufest	14 August 2021	Truth Dox	Rintu Thomas and Sushmit Ghosh	Won	
Films from the South Festival	18 November 2021	Doc:South Award	Rintu Thomas and Sushmit Ghosh	Won	
IDA Documentary Awards	4 March 2022	Best Feature	Rintu Thomas and Sushmit Ghosh	Nominated	
International Documentary Film Festival Amsterdam	26 November 2021	NPO IDFA Audience Award	Rintu Thomas and Sushmit Ghosh	Won	
Kraków Film Festival	5 June 2021	Silver Horn for Best Film on Social Issues	Rintu Thomas and Sushmit Ghosh	Won	
Kyiv International Film Festival "Molodist"	5 June 2021	Best Documentary	Rintu Thomas and Sushmit Ghosh	Won	
Mountainfilm	31 May 2021	Special Jury Prize – Best Documentary Feature	Rintu Thomas and Sushmit Ghosh	Won	
Peabody Awards	11 June 2023	Documentary	Writing with Fire	Won	
Producers Guild of America Awards	19 March 2022	Outstanding Producer of Documentary Motion Pictures	Rintu Thomas and Sushmit Ghosh	Nominated	
San Francisco International Film Festival	17 April 2021	McBaine Documentary Feature Award	Rintu Thomas and Sushmit Ghosh	Won	
Seattle International Film Festival	18 April 2021	Special Jury Prize – Documentary Competition	Writing with Fire	Won	
Social Impact Media Awards	10 February 2022	Best Documentary	Writing with Fire	Nominated	
Social Impact Media Awards	10 February 2022	Best Director	Rintu Thomas and Sushmit Ghosh	Won	
Social Impact Media Awards	10 February 2022	Best Cinematography	Sushmit Ghosh and Karan Thapliyal	Won	
Sundance Film Festival	2 February 2021	Audience Award: World Cinema Documentary	Rintu Thomas and Sushmit Ghosh	Won	
Sundance Film Festival	2 February 2021	World Cinema Documentary Special Jury Award: Impact for Change	Rintu Thomas and Sushmit Ghosh	Won	
Valladolid International Film Festival	30 October 2021	Time of History Award	Writing with Fire	Won	
Valladolid International Film Festival	30 October 2021	Fundos Award	Writing with Fire	Won	
Wisconsin Film Festival	20 May 2021	Audience Favorite Documentary Feature	Writing with Fire	Won	
Yamagata International Documentary Film Festival	14 October 2021	Citizens' Prize	Writing with Fire	Won	
