= Dilli (film) =

- Directed by: Sushmit Ghosh; Rintu Thomas
- Produced by: Robin Raina
- Production company: Black Ticket Films
- Release date: 21 April 2011 (US)
- Country: India
- Language: Hindi

Dilli is an Indian documentary film that explores issues of urbanization, development and space through the narratives of people living in Delhi, capital to the world's largest democracy.

Dilli is directed by Sushmit Ghosh and Rintu Thomas of Black Ticket Films and executive produced by Robin Raina. The film brings out a stark comparison of the rampant progress and development of the megalopolis vis-à-vis thousands who are left homeless while the whole city is modernized and revamped. The film was premiered at the NASDAQ in Times Square, New York City on 1 April 2011 following the ringing of the NASDAQ closing bell by Robin Raina, Founder RRF.

The film is being used by non-governmental institutions, advocacy groups as well as educational institutions across Asia, Europe and North America to engage with larger audiences about issues of development and urbanization.

== Awards ==
Dilli was declared the 1st-place winner in the Short Documentary section at the Los Angeles Movie Awards. The film also won the Best Cinematography award in the short documentary section. The film got mention at the 2011 Los Angeles International Underground Film Festival. Dilli found honorable mention in Los Angeles Art House Film Festival 2011. Dilli also won the Best Documentary Award at the 2012 Norwich Film Festival.
