= Extreme Ice Survey =

Global warming survey

- Extreme Ice Survey logo
- Founded: 2007
- Founder: James Balog
- Purpose: Providing a visual baseline for demonstrating the effects of climate change
- Region served: World-wide
- Method: Using cameras to record changes in glaciers to reveal how fast climate change is transforming large regions of the planet
- Website: extremeicesurvey.org

The Extreme Ice Survey (EIS), based in Boulder, Colorado, uses time-lapse photography, conventional photography and video to document the effects of global warming on glacial ice. It is the most wide-ranging glacier study ever conducted using ground-based, real-time photography. Starting in 2007 the EIS team installed as many as 43 time-lapse cameras at a time at 18 glaciers in Greenland, Iceland, Alaska, Canada, the Nepalese Himalaya (where cameras were installed at Mount Everest in 2010), and the Rocky Mountains of the U.S. The cameras shoot year-round, during daylight, at various rates. The team supplements the time-lapse record by occasionally repeating shots at fixed locations in Iceland, Bolivia, the Canadian province of British Columbia and the French and Swiss Alps. Collected images are being used for scientific evidence and as part of a global outreach campaign aimed at educating the public about the effects of climate change. EIS imagery has appeared in time-lapse videos displayed in the terminal at Denver International Airport; in media productions such as the 2009 NOVA Extreme Ice documentary on PBS; and is the focus of the feature-length film Chasing Ice, directed by Jeff Orlowski, which premiered at the Sundance film festival in Utah on January 23, 2012. Major findings were published in 2012 in Ice: Portraits of the World’s Vanishing Glaciers by James Balog (Rizzoli Publishing).

== History ==
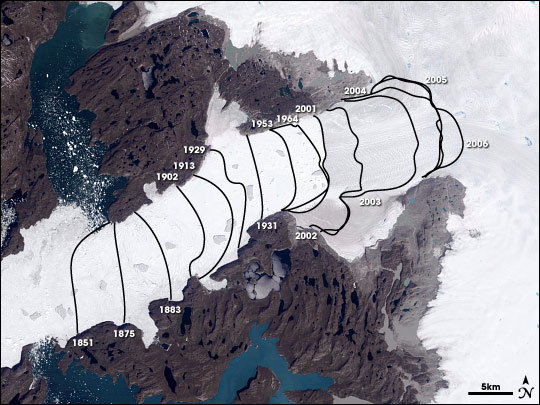
Retreating calving front of the Jacobshavn Isbrae glacier in Greenland from 1851 - 2006.

Nature photojournalist James Balog founded the Extreme Ice Survey in 2007 after spending much of the previous two years photographing receding glaciers for National Geographic and The New Yorker. Balog saw extraordinary amounts of ice vanishing with shocking speed. Features that took centuries to develop were being destroyed much faster than scientific modeling had predicted, sometimes in just a few years—or even just a few weeks. Balog founded the EIS to provide visual evidence of the dramatic effects of global warming. The project ultimately evolved into an intensive team effort, bringing together journalists and scientists, artists and engineers.

== Mission ==
The EIS aims to show epochal change happening within the time frame of human life, and to provide scientists with a photographic record to understand the mechanics and pace of glacial retreat and how it relates to climate change.

== Fieldwork and equipment ==
The EIS team chose to put its time-lapse cameras — Nikon D200 DSLR cameras powered by a custom-made combination of solar panels, batteries and other electronics — at accessible and photogenic sites that represented regional conditions well, had high scientific value and were photographically and logistically manageable. Each camera system weighs 125-150 pounds or more and had to be secured with anchors and guy wires against winds up to 150 mph, as well as against temperatures as low as -40 °F, blizzards, landslides, torrential rain and avalanches. The cameras shot once every hour, half hour, 15 minutes or 5 minutes, in daylight hours, for approximately 8,000 images per camera per year. The total survey archives now include more than 800,000 frames. By capturing images in diverse locations throughout the Northern Hemisphere over several years, the EIS can provide a more complete picture of the effect of global warming across different geographic regions than previous ground-based, time-lapse studies. As of January 2012, the team has 27 cameras at 18 glaciers.

== Project team ==
=== Founder ===
The images of photojournalist James Balog have received international acclaim, including a Heinz Award, the Leica Medal of Excellence and the premier awards for both nature and science photography at World Press Photo in Amsterdam. Exhibitions of his images have been shown at more than 100 museums and galleries from Greece to Paris, New York to Los Angeles. He was the first photographer ever commissioned to create a series of stamps for the U.S. Postal Service; the 1996 release featured America's endangered wildlife. Balog's work has been published in numerous major magazines, including National Geographic, The New Yorker, Life, Vanity Fair, The New York Times Magazine, Audubon and Outside. Balog is the author of seven books: Wildlife Requiem (1984), Survivors: A New Vision of Endangered Wildlife (1990), Anima (1993), James Balog’s Animals A to Z (1996), Animal (1999), Tree: A New Vision of the American Forest (2004), and Extreme Ice Now: Vanishing Glaciers and Changing Climate, A Progress Report (2009). Balog, a Sustainability Ambassador for The North Face, holds a bachelor's degree in speech/communications from Boston College and a master's degree in geomorphology from the University of Colorado.

=== Research team ===
- Jason Box – Researcher at the Ohio State University Byrd Polar Research Center and assistant professor of geography at Ohio State. Since 1994, Box has completed 21 expeditions to the Greenland ice sheet. An authority on the relationship between Greenland glaciers and the Earth's climate, he contributed to the 2007 Intergovernmental Panel on Climate Change summary report.
- Daniel B. Fagre – Ecologist and climate change research coordinator for the U.S. Geological Survey in Glacier National Park, Montana. Fagre has been doing repeat photography on the dwindling ice masses of Glacier National Park for nearly two decades and is the author of the 2007 book, Sustaining Rocky Mountain Landscapes: Science, Policy and Management of the Crown of the Continent Ecosystem.

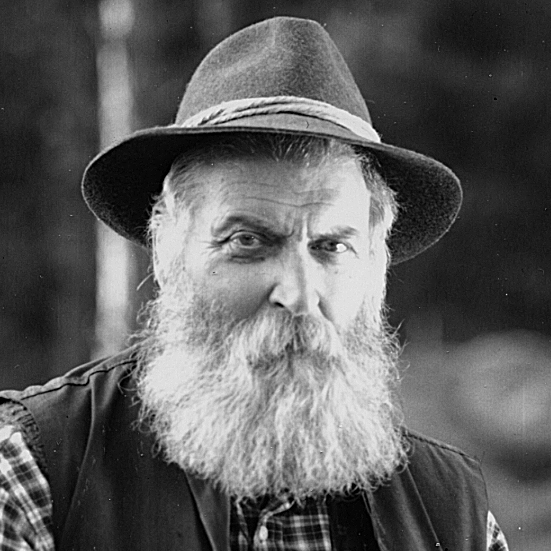
Tad Pfeffer in 2017

- Tad Pfeffer – Researcher at the Institute of Arctic and Alpine Research and professor of civil, environmental and architectural engineering at the University of Colorado at Boulder. Pfeffer's research includes studies of the mechanics and dynamics of glaciers, and heat and mass transfer in snow. He has worked on glaciers for 30 years, including two decades of field work on Alaska's Columbia Glacier. Pfeffer does extensive work with photography and photogrammetry of glaciers and landscapes, using the imagery to describe and analyze glacier changes. Pfeffer's photography has appeared in numerous scientific publications, as well as American Scientist and GEO (Germany) magazines, BBC television productions, special exhibitions and in both the movie and book An Inconvenient Truth, by Al Gore.
- Conrad Anker – Mountaineer known for his work in Antarctica and in the Himalaya, especially in locating the body of George Mallory on Mount Everest in 1999.

=== Scientific advisors ===
- Mark Fahnestock, University of New Hampshire
- Martin Truffer, University of Alaska
- Ian Joughin, Polar Science Center, University of Washington
- Oddur Sigurdsson, President, Icelandic Glaciological Society
- Konrad Steffen, Director, Cooperative Institute for Research in the Environmental Sciences (CIRES), University of Colorado
- James White, Director, Institute of Arctic and Alpine Research (INSTAAR), University of Colorado

== Sponsors ==
The Extreme Ice Survey is funded by prominent research and scientific organizations, as well as several corporate partners.

=== Patrons ===
- NASA
- National Geographic Expeditions Council
- National Geographic magazine
- National Science Foundation
- Nikon
- Leopard Communications

=== Corporate partners ===
- Manfrotto
- Panasonic
- Pelican Products
- The North Face
- Rudy Project

== See also ==
- Alaska
- Alps
- Bolivia
- Climate change
- Geomorphology
- Glacier National Park
- Global warming
- Greenland
- Greenland Ice Sheet
- Iceland
- Intergovernmental Panel on Climate Change
- Rocky Mountains
- time-lapse photography
