= Chasing Ice =

2012 documentary film directed by Jeff Orlowski

- Theatrical release poster
- Directed by: Jeff Orlowski
- Written by: Mark Monroe
- Produced by: Paula DuPre' Pesemen, Jerry Aronson
- Cinematography: Jeff Orlowski
- Edited by: Davis Coombe
- Music by: J. Ralph
- Distributed by: Submarine Deluxe
- Release dates: January 23, 2012 (Sundance Film Festival); November 16, 2012 (United States)
- Running time: 75 min
- Country: United States
- Language: English
- Box office: $1,331,836

Chasing Ice is a 2012 documentary film about the efforts of nature photographer James Balog and his insane Extreme Ice Survey (EIS) to publicize the effects of climate change. The film was directed by Jeff Orlowski. It was released in the United States on November 16, 2012.

The documentary includes scenes from a glacier calving event that took place at Jacobshavn Isbræ in Greenland, lasting 75 minutes, the longest such event ever captured on film. Two EIS videographers waited several weeks in a small tent overlooking the glacier and, finally, witnessed 7.4 cubic kilometres (1.8 cu mi) of ice crashing off the glacier. "The calving of a massive glacier believed to have produced the ice that sank the Titanic is like watching a city break apart."

== Synopsis ==
Environmental photographer James Balog heads to Greenland, Iceland and Alaska in order to capture images that will help to convey the effects of global warming. Balog was initially skeptical about climate change when the issue entered scientific discussion, but after his first trip north, he becomes convinced of the impact that humans have on the planet and becomes committed to bringing the story to the public.

Within months of the first trip to Iceland, Balog initiates The Extreme Ice Survey, an expedition to collect data on the seasonal changes of glaciers. Balog and his team deploy cameras that utilize time-lapse photography across various places in the Arctic to capture a multi-year record of the world's glaciers.

The expedition starts off poorly as the team is plagued by numerous technical problems and camera malfunctions. Meanwhile, due to the extreme physical nature of the expeditions, Balog's personal health suffers in the form of knee complications.

After making improvements to the equipment, Balog and his team finally collected time-lapse photographs that depict the drastic erosion and disappearance of enormous, ancient glaciers.

== Reception ==
As of October 2020, this film has a rating of 96% on Rotten Tomatoes, based on 72 reviews and an average score of 7.6/10. The website's critical consensus states, "Chasing Ice captures the urgency of climate change while prevailing as entertainment, thanks [to] the awe-inspiring scenery and James Balog's charisma". It also has a score of 75 out of 100 on Metacritic, based on 15 critics, indicating "generally favorable" reviews.

The film won the Satellite Award for Best Documentary Film.

== Music ==
The film received an Academy Award nomination for Best Original Song for the song "Before My Time," written by J. Ralph and performed by Scarlett Johansson and Joshua Bell.
