= Antonio Ochoa Piccardo =

Venezuelan architect (born 1956)

- Born: July 8, 1956 (age 70); Caracas, Venezuela
- Education: Universidad Central de Venezuela
- Occupation: Architect
- Spouse: Jenny Mendoza Rodriguez
- Children: 3

Antonio Ochoa Piccardo (born July 8, 1956) is a Venezuelan architect. He is considered one of the first and most influential foreign architects in Beijing since its economic opening in 1979.

== Biography ==
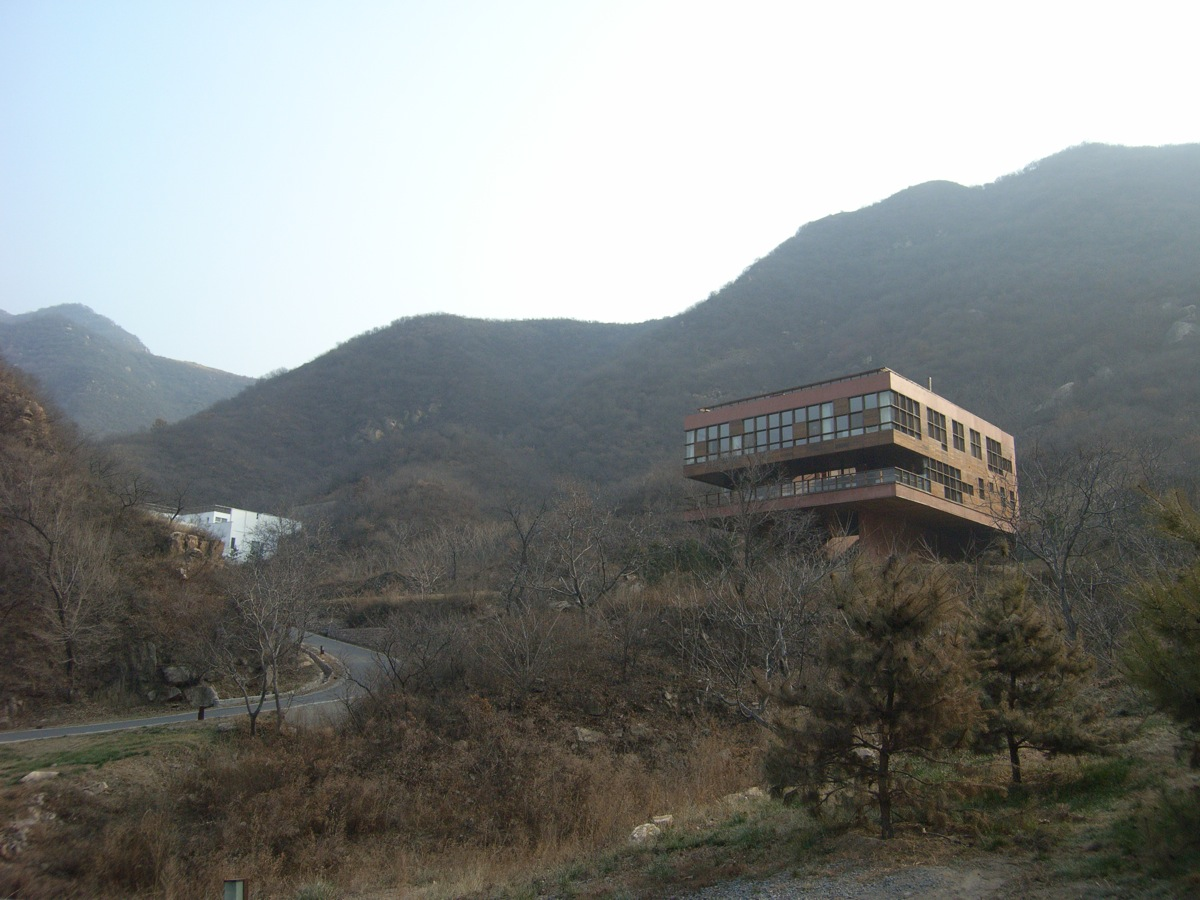
Red House in the Commune by the Great Wall in Beijing, China

Antonio Ochoa Piccardo was born on July 8, 1956, in Caracas, Venezuela. In 1968, his family moved to Beijing during the cultural revolution when his father took a job with the Xinhua News Agency. They returned to Caracas shortly after.

Ochoa Piccardo received a degree in architecture from the Venezuelan Central University. After visiting his brother in Beijing in 1990, he quit his job as a university professor and decided to immigrate back to Beijing with his wife.

He started his firm 8And8Architects, and shortly after caught the eyes of couple Zhang Xin and Pan Shiyi, who named him chief architect at SOHO China Ltd in 1999. His first major project for the company was SOHO New Town, an office and apartment building complex in the heart of the Chaoyang District. It became one of SOHO China's early successes, and a landmark of contemporary architecture in Beijing.

In 2000, Ochoa Piccardo played a part in developing the Commune by the Great Wall, a boutique hotel project in the Yanqing District. The hotel consists of private villas designed by twelve elite architects including Shigeru Ban and Kengo Kuma. Ochoa Piccardo is the only non-Asian among the twelve architects. For the Commune, he designed the Red House, also known as the Cantilever House. The hotel's architecture was exhibited at La Biennale di Venezia in 2002 and was bestowed a special prize.

In 2005, Ochoa Piccardo established his own architecture firm, Red House China.

Ochoa Piccardo has come to be regarded as one of the most recognisable contemporary architects of Latin America, and one of the most influential architectural figures in modern Beijing. His written work on architecture has been published in mainstream journals and magazines worldwide, including the Financial Times and the Phaidon Atlas of Contemporary World Architecture. In 2017, he was awarded the title of International Executive Business Talents (Business Elite) by the Chaoyang District for his hand in its development.
