= Musk (film) =

2026 documentary film by Alex Gibney

- Theatrical release poster
- Directed by: Alex Gibney
- Written by: Alex Gibney
- Produced by: Jessie Deeter; Alex Gibney; Dana O'Keefe; Joey Marra; Zhang Xin; Nick Shumaker; Jessica Grimshaw; Ronan Farrow; Erin Edeiken; Lawrence Wright
- Starring: Justine Musk; Ashley St. Clair; Kara Swisher; Martin Eberhard; Zoë Schiffer; Geoffrey Hinton
- Cinematography: Benjamin Bloodwell
- Edited by: Michael J. Palmer
- Music by: Daniel Pemberton
- Production companies: Jigsaw Productions; HBO Documentary Films; Double Agent; AC Independent; Closer Media
- Distributed by: Bleecker Street (United States); Universal Pictures (International)
- Release dates: September 8, 2026 (Venice); October 9, 2026 (United States)
- Running time: 235 minutes
- Country: United States
- Language: English
- Box office: $759,658

Musk is a 2026 documentary film directed by Alex Gibney. It follows the billionaire industrialist Elon Musk and his enormous influence on the world. The film had its world premiere out of competition at the 83rd Venice International Film Festival on September 8, 2026. It was released theatrically in the United States by Bleecker Street on October 9, 2026.

== Synopsis ==
Its producers described the film as "a definitive and unvarnished examination" of Elon Musk. Appearing in the film are Musk's ex-wife Justine Musk and Ashley St. Clair, with whom he has a son, journalists Kara Swisher and Zoë Schiffer, Tesla co-founder Martin Eberhard, and AI pioneer Geoffrey Hinton.

== Production ==
Alex Gibney revealed in March 2023 that he had started work on the documentary and was months into production. Joining Gibney in producing the documentary are Jessie Deeter for Jigsaw Productions, Dana O'Keefe for Double Agent, Joey Marra and Zhang Xin for Closer Media, with Anonymous Content's Nick Shumaker and Jessica Grimshaw. David Byrne wrote and performed the song "Let Me Sell You a Dream", co-written with the documentary's composer Daniel Pemberton, for the documentary. The song contains quotes from Musk, which Byrne described as, "All his own words. No editorializing. Straight from the man's mouth to mine".

Without access to Musk himself, the team hired the integrated studio MakeMake to design a partly-AI avatar of Musk, intentionally animated to be uncanny valley, that would be paired with real recordings of Musk, including archival clips and audio from podcasts. "… we took on board the idea of Musk’s own obsession with this idea that we’re living in a simulation, a kind of existential video game. So within that context, I thought, ‘OK, how about a simulated interview?’" Gibney remarked.

== Release ==
In May 2023, HBO Documentary Films acquired North American television and streaming rights to the film, with Black Bear International, whose joint venture with New Regency called Double Agent co-produced the film, acquiring international sales rights, planning to sell the documentary at the Marché du Film. In October 2023, Universal Pictures Content Group acquired international distribution rights from Black Bear.

In August 2025, Bleecker Street acquired U.S. distribution rights to the documentary; the deal excludes television and streaming rights, which were pre-bought by HBO. It was released theatrically in the United States on October 9, 2026, by Bleecker Street. It was previously scheduled to be released on October 16. Also in October 2026, Bleecker Street was acquired by Outerlight Entertainment, which counts billionaire Pierre Omidyar among its backers; incidentally, Outerlight has also backed the streaming service Passionflix, run by Musk's sister Tosca. TikTok suspended an account promoting the film for two days as it expanded nationwide, before reinstating it and blaming an "error". The platform stated that it violated policy on political content without citing a specific policy.

In November 2026, Skydance CEO David Ellison confirmed that Musk made a $1 billion investment in the company following its acquisition of HBO parent Warner Bros. Discovery in October, and that it was still committed to releasing the documentary on the HBO network and HBO Max streaming service. Overseas, Universal will release the film theatrically on January 15, 2027, in the United Kingdom, followed by Germany on January 21, Spain on February 5, France on February 17 and Australia on February 25.

== Reception ==
=== Box office ===
Musk opened in the United States on October 9, 2026, in four theaters, then expanded to 472 theaters in its second weekend and fell to 63 in its third. Box Office Mojo reported a domestic opening of $69,321 and a total gross of $759,658; The Numbers also lists a $759,658 domestic total, with a peak of 472 theaters. Gizmodo called the nationwide expansion "an unmitigated flop."

=== Critical response ===
On the review aggregator website Rotten Tomatoes, 95% of 83 critics' reviews are positive, with an average rating of 7.6/10. The website's consensus reads: "Alex Gibney's Musk offers a sharp, revealing portrait of Elon Musk's transformation from celebrated innovator to controversial power broker, examining the far-reaching consequences of his influence." On Metacritic, the film has a weighted average score of 77 out of 100, based on 22 critics, indicating "generally favorable" reviews.

Writing for Variety, Owen Gleiberman gave it a positive review, calling it "a lacerating and important watch, grounded in Alex Gibney's supremely insightful but user-friendly mastery of the documentary form", and wrote that "what should scare us about him is how he coddles his own interests by passing them off as the world's." In a negative review, Eileen Jones of Jacobin criticized it for its presentation, cynical tone, and runtime, writing that "there's a problem when even I, a fervent, long-term Musk hater, get exhausted, then irritated, then fed up by this film long before its grueling four-hour running time is over."

=== Musk's response ===
Elon Musk responded to the report of the documentary in production by using his X account to call it "a hit piece". Gibney responded by asking "how would you know?" via his X account. Musk described the film as "a hit piece that misses" and claimed that it was "a psy op". NPR reported that one of Musk's lawyers threatened to sue Gibney for defamation over a claim about lasers in the film. In a review for NPR, Bobby Allyn wrote that Gibney "does dabble in conspiratorial thinking" in the scene linking Musk's "lasers in space" texts to Starlink and the 2024 election—a narrative Allyn noted election officials had "repeatedly debunked"—as well as in an unsubstantiated suggestion that Musk could use DOGE data to interfere in the midterms.

=== Accolades ===
Award	Date	Category	Recipient(s)	Result	Ref.
Critics' Choice Documentary Awards	November 8, 2026	Best Documentary Feature	Musk	Nominated	
Critics' Choice Documentary Awards	November 8, 2026	Best Political Documentary	Musk	Nominated	
Critics' Choice Documentary Awards	November 8, 2026	Best Biographical Documentary	Musk	Won	
