= SOHO 3Q =

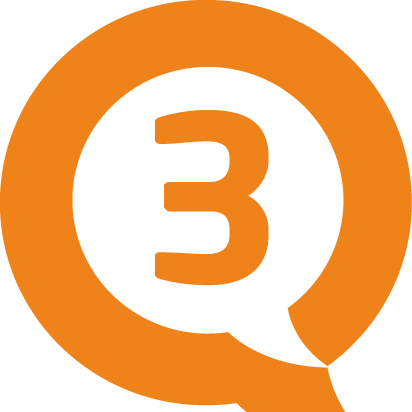
- Formation: February 2015
- Founders: Zhang Xin, Pan Shiyi
- Headquarters: Beijing, China
- Parent organization: SOHO China
- Website: www.soho3q.com

SOHO 3Q is a shared office space in China managed by SOHO China. It is headquartered at Chaowai SOHO in Beijing. As of June 2019, the coworking space had 30 spaces in China.

== History ==
3Q was initiated by the real estate firm SOHO China, established in 1995, after it began exploring the concept of co-working spaces, a model similar to those of companies like Airbnb and Uber. The project was formally announced in January 2015 by SOHO China's chairman, Pan Shiyi.

The initial spaces, Wangjing 3Q in Beijing and Fuxing 3Q in Shanghai, opened on February 1, 2016. By the end of 2016, 3Q had establishments in 11 locations in Beijing and Shanghai, accommodating various Chinese corporations, such as LeTV and Meituan.

In April 2016, Guanghualu II 3Q opened in the Beijing central business district as the largest space with over 3000 desk.

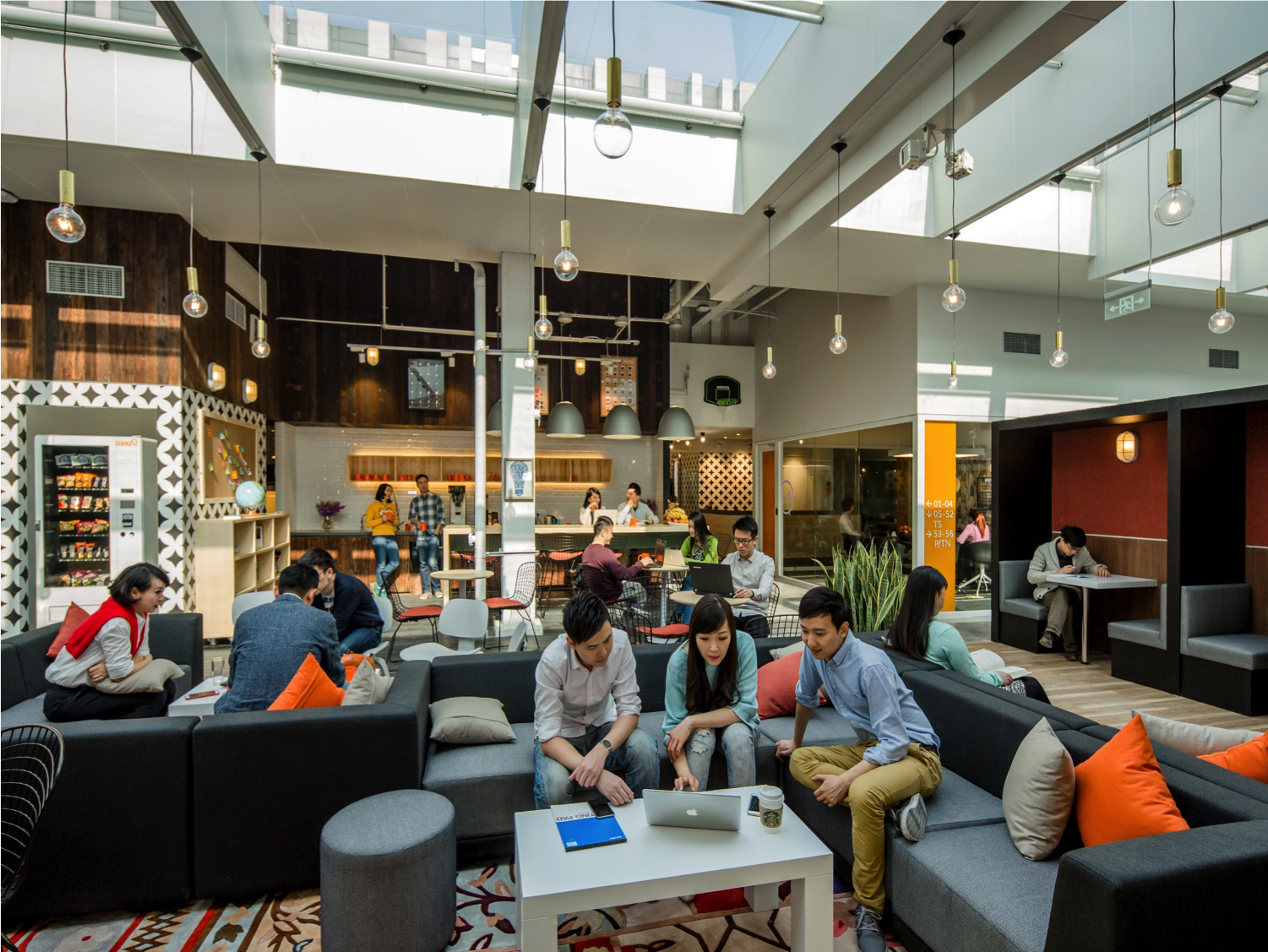
Fuxing 3Q in Shanghai

== Architecture and design ==
3Q's parent company is known for its architectural design, and Wangjing SOHO, one of the first 3Q spaces, was designed by Zaha Hadid Architects and led by founder Zaha Hadid. The building, which is LEED-certified, was designed to resemble a mountain range. The middle floors are dedicated to 3Q coworking, occupying 6,000 square meters.

Another early building, Fuxing 3Q, was designed by GMP Architecture and AIM Architecture.

Guanghualu SOHO II building was designed by GMP Architecture, hosting the largest 3Q Space of approximately 21,000 square meters containing over 3300 desks. The space was initially designed as a shopping mall, but was converted into the coworking space by AIM Architecture. Distinctive features include an oak staircase that frames a venue for events and a second atrium called The Park.

More than 80% of all 3Q projects are housed in existing SOHO China properties, including refurbished shopping malls, office towers, and mixed-use buildings.

== Facilities ==
3Q provides both private offices and individual workstations in an open-office layout. Tenants rent individual desks on a weekly basis, with prices ranging from 560 yuan ($93) to 1,000 yuan ($160) per desk per week. Additional services available include WIFI, conference rooms, printing machines, and phone booths. 3Q also organizes entrepreneurship events.
