= Park Avenue Plaza =

Office building in Manhattan, New York

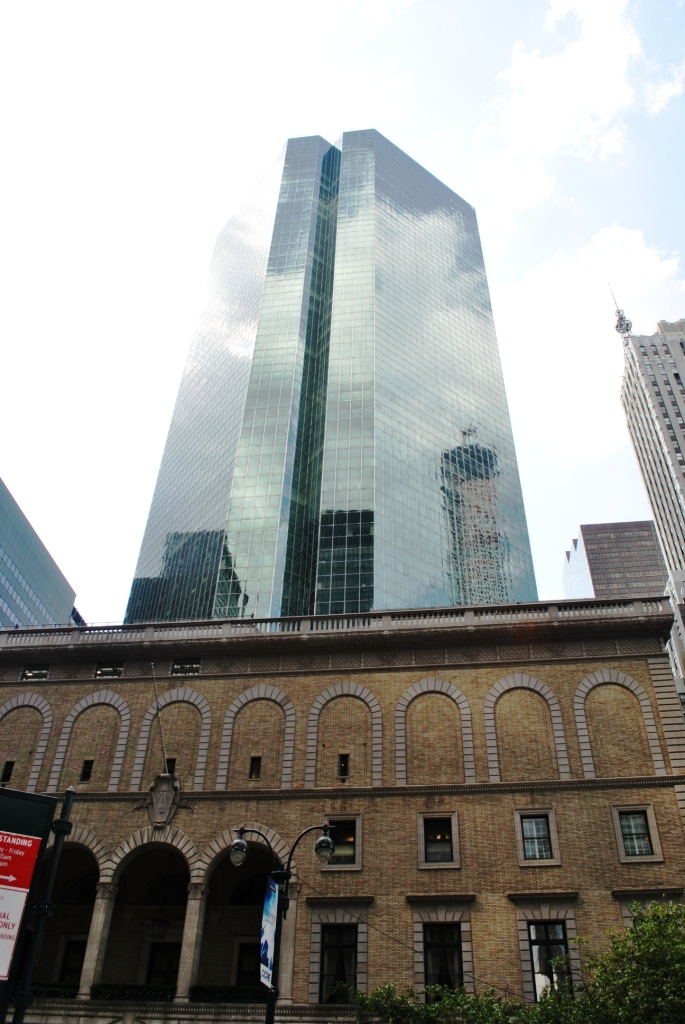
- Park Avenue Plaza viewed from Park Avenue, rising behind the Racquet and Tennis Club
- Interactive map of the Park Avenue Plaza area

General information
- Location: 55 East 52nd Street; Manhattan, New York
- Coordinates: 40°45′31″N 73°58′25″W
- Completed: 1981
- Owner: Fisher Brothers, Vornado Realty Trust

Height
- Height: 574 feet (175 m)

Design and construction
- Architecture firm: Skidmore, Owings & Merrill

Park Avenue Plaza is an office building at 55 East 52nd Street in the Midtown Manhattan neighborhood of New York City. The 575-foot (175 m) tall, 44-story building was designed by Skidmore, Owings & Merrill (SOM) for development company Fisher Brothers and was completed in 1981. Despite its name, the building is not actually on Park Avenue, although it abuts the Racquet and Tennis Club building along the avenue. Rather, the building is in the middle of a city block, with entrances on 52nd and 53rd Streets.

The building has a 15-sided massing, with wide diagonal facades to its northeast and southeast, as well as a deep notch on its east. Park Avenue Plaza's facade is made of blue-green reflective panels of glass. The building has one basement, shallower than in other nearby skyscrapers. The building's lowest ten stories include a lobby, atrium, and mechanical equipment, enabling all the office stories to have windows facing Park Avenue. At the base of the building is an enclosed atrium measuring about 30 feet (9.1 m) tall and connecting the two entrances to the building's elevators. Each office story has about 28,000 square feet (2,600 m^{2}) of rentable area; the entire building covers over a million square feet. The building's design prompted mixed reviews upon its completion.

Fisher Brothers acquired the site in the 1970s and proposed constructing a ground-level atrium in exchange for additional space. Construction commenced in March 1979 following negotiations with the Racquet and Tennis Club, which had threatened to build a hotel above its own building. The building was conceived as a speculative development and 90% of the space had been leased before construction was completed. Fisher Brothers has operated Park Avenue Plaza since the building opened in 1981. First Boston, a major tenant, owned a minority stake in the building until 1987. The Boston-based Rockpoint Group bought a 49% stake in 2010, selling it in 2011 to SOHO China. In 2026, Vornado Realty Trust bought SOHO China's 49% stake.

== Site ==
Park Avenue Plaza is at 55 East 52nd Street in the Midtown Manhattan neighborhood of New York City. It is in the middle of the block bounded by 52nd Street to the south, Madison Avenue to the west, 53rd Street to the north, and Park Avenue to the east. Despite its name, Park Avenue Plaza is not actually situated on Park Avenue, nor does it have a plaza. The tower abuts the Racquet and Tennis Club Building, which actually is on Park Avenue, to the east. The tower's name had been conceived as a way to add prestige to the midblock site. Park Avenue Plaza is assigned its own ZIP Code, 10055; it was one of 41 buildings in Manhattan that had their own ZIP Codes as of 2019.

Nearby buildings include CBS Studio Building and Omni Berkshire Place to the west; 488 Madison Avenue to the southwest; 345 Park Avenue to the southeast; the Seagram Building to the east; 399 Park Avenue to the northeast; and Lever House to the north. In addition, an entrance to the New York City Subway's Fifth Avenue/53rd Street station (served by the E, F, and <F> trains), is directly across 53rd Street.

== Architecture ==
Park Avenue Plaza was designed by Raul de Armas of the firm Skidmore, Owings & Merrill (SOM). It was built for the development company Fisher Brothers. The structure measures 575 feet (175 m) tall. To erect a larger building than would have normally been allowed on the site, Fisher Brothers acquired air rights from the Racquet and Tennis Club Building and from the CBS Studio Building.

=== Form and facade ===
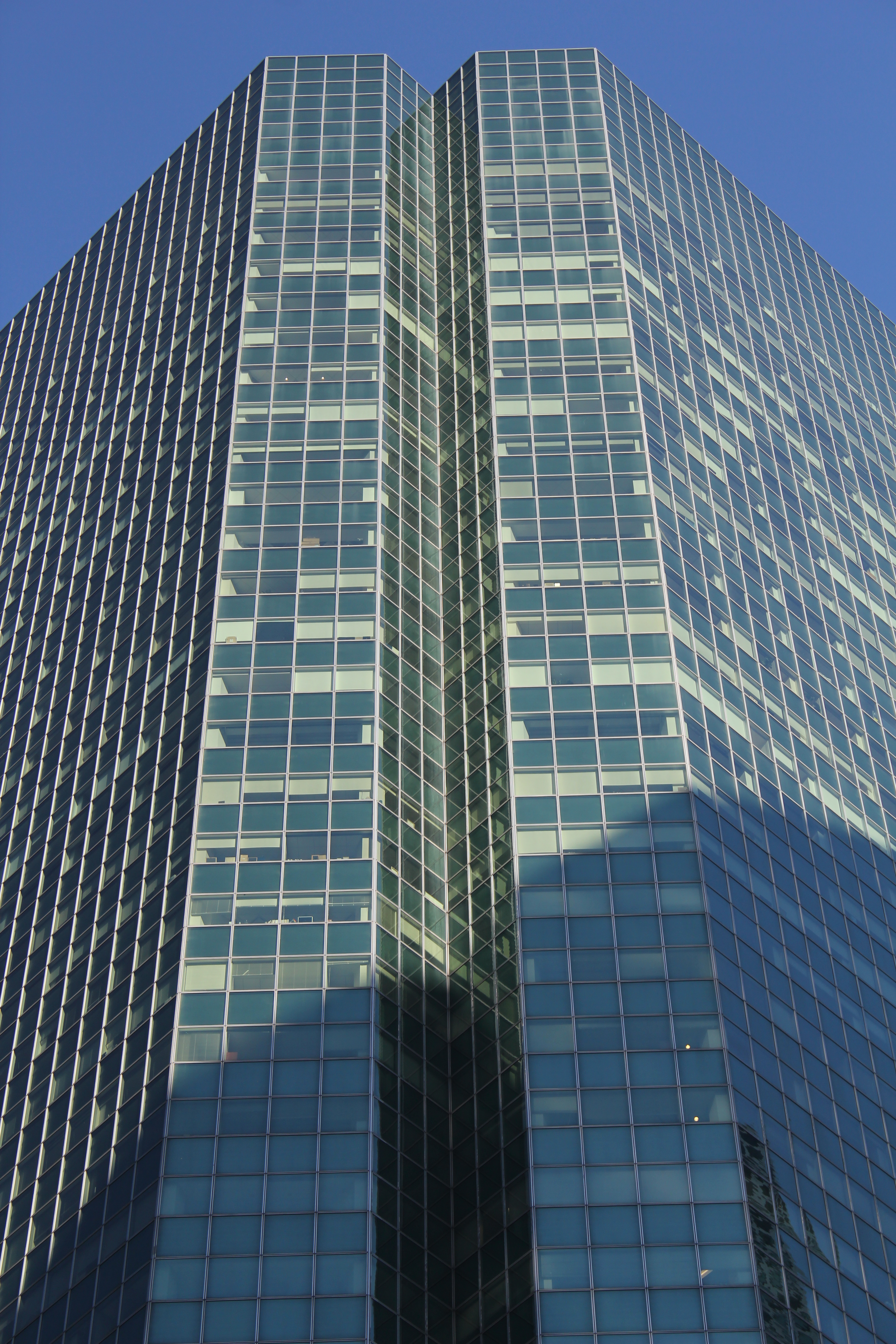
The notch on the eastern elevation

The building has a 15-sided massing, with wide diagonal chamfers to its northeast and southeast. The building's wide northeastern and southeastern elevations converge at the middle of the block. The narrow eastern elevation contains a central groove facing Park Avenue. According to architectural critic Paul Goldberger, the presence of the groove makes the eastern elevation "appear smaller still". The groove is aligned with the three arches at the center of the Racquet and Tennis Club Building's facade. There are similar grooves on other elevations of the facade, which were intended to reduce the building's perceived scale. Early plans for the building had called for setbacks at two places, matching the heights of neighboring buildings, but SOM's final plans called for a tower without any setbacks.

The base of the tower is the same height as the Racquet and Tennis Club Building's cornice line. The main entrances are through revolving doors on 52nd and 53rd Streets. The facade is made of blue-green reflective panels of glass, alternating with silver mullions. SOM had chosen that color because they had wanted the facade to blend in with those of neighboring buildings, although the color contrasted with the tan-brick facade of the Racquet and Tennis Club Building. At the time of Park Avenue Plaza's completion, Lever House (also designed by SOM) was the only other nearby building with a blue-green glass facade. The facade contained a lightly glazed finish, which reflected heat during the summer.

=== Features ===
The building has one basement, shallower than in other nearby skyscrapers, since basement offices were generally not attractive to commercial tenants. This reduced the costs of constructing the foundation. The building's lowest ten stories include a lobby, atrium, and mechanical equipment. The mechanical floors cover 241,000 square feet (22,400 m^{2}). By placing the mechanical stories near the bottom of the building, this allowed all of the office stories to have windows facing Park Avenue. There is an elevator core at the center of the building with shafts for 21 elevators.

The office stories rise above a set of crossbeams on the ninth floor. The columns on these stories are attached to the crossbeams. Each office story contains 12 corners and covers about 25,000 square feet (2,300 m^{2}) or 28,000 square feet (2,600 m^{2}) of area. As an energy-efficiency measure, each story had individual climate controls, rather than a master control for the entire building. The top ten floors are connected by an open stairway, and the top story has a ceiling height of 10.5 feet (3.2 m). In the late 1990s, insurance company Swiss Re redesigned the top six floors of the building, cutting off the open stairway below the 39th floor.

==== Atrium ====
At the base of the building is an enclosed atrium measuring about 30 feet (9.1 m) tall and connecting 52nd and 53rd Streets. The space was built in exchange for a zoning bonus; its presence contrasted with neighboring buildings that featured a large open plaza. Fisher Brothers intended for the atrium to resemble a shopping arcade, namely Burlington Arcade in London. The middle of the atrium contains stainless-steel columns. There are eight columns with round corner, each measuring 3 feet (0.91 m) wide by 6 inches (150 mm) thick. The atrium contains two glass walls, which measure a combined 300 square feet (28 m^{2}) and contain illuminated glass-crystal tubes. There is also a glass reception desk measuring 66 feet (20 m) long.

The atrium contains a large painting by Frank Stella, a pair of brass sculptures with "organic" motifs by William Crovelli, and a waterfall on the eastern wall. The space contains tables and chairs and was originally planted with small ficus trees. To accommodate the plantings, the atrium had bright lighting with an intensity of about 200 foot-candles. A set of escalators lead up to a mezzanine-level elevator lobby. At the time of its opening, the atrium also had one of Midtown Manhattan's few public restrooms. The atrium contains a public shopping arcade, which was not required as part of the zoning bonus. The storefronts cover 20,000 square feet (1,900 m^{2}) and originally contained bow windows as well as brass and granite decorations. The space also has green marble walls with dark green glass.

== History ==
=== Development ===
==== Planning ====
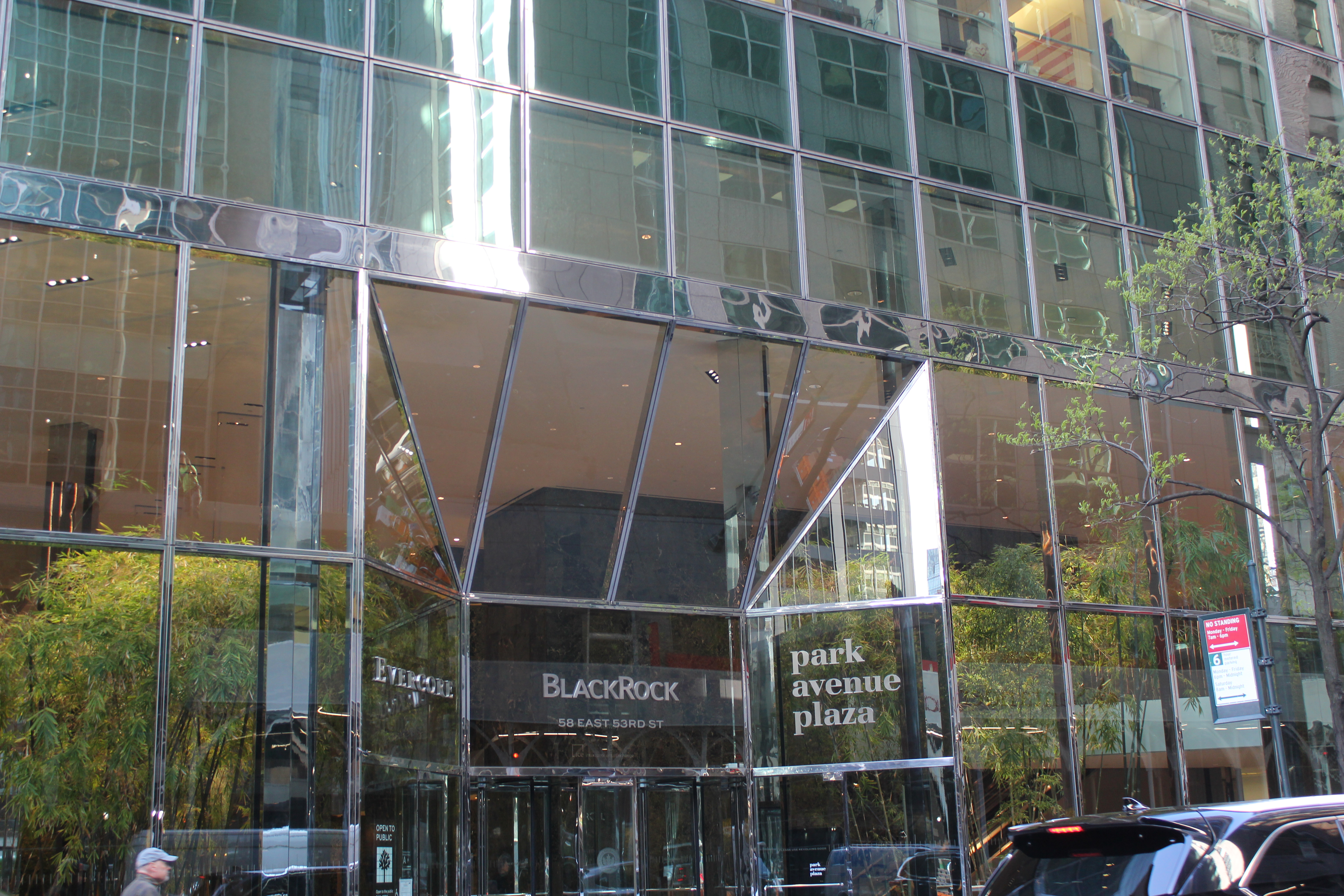
Entrance on 52nd Street

For several years in the 1970s, Fisher Brothers had been negotiating with the Racquet and Tennis Club to buy the unused air rights above the latter's clubhouse. The firm had already acquired a site behind the clubhouse on 52nd and 53rd Streets, and it had hired SOM to design a 15-sided office building facing Park Avenue. The project was one of several large office buildings proposed in New York City after the mid-1970s recession. The developers planned to name the building "Park Avenue Plaza", though the Manhattan borough president's office had to approve this name. Fisher Brothers wanted to build an entrance to its office building through the clubhouse, but the firm and the club were unable to agree on this aspect of the design. Instead, the developers' lawyer Samuel H. Liddenbaum requested a Park Avenue address from the borough president's office, and he proposed that the building include an enclosed atrium or galleria.

Negotiations between Fisher Brothers and the Racquet and Tennis Club were halted after the New York City Department of City Planning (DCP) announced in 1978 that Fisher Brothers could not only have an address on Park Avenue, but also up to 200,000 ft^{2} (19,000 m^{2}) of additional office space, if the developers built a 60-foot-high (18 m) galleria. The "galleria bonus" would increase the amount of rentable floor area in the new building by 20 percent, raising the floor area ratio from 15 to 18. Fisher Brothers agreed to maintain public restrooms and add a cafe to the galleria. The developers also proposed allocating $100,000 toward the renovation of the Fifth Avenue/53rd Street station. The New York City Planning Commission (CPC) voted 4–2 to approve the galleria bonus in May 1978. Two commissioners had voted against the measure on the grounds that the galleria would provide little "public benefit".

By early 1978, the new building was planned to cost $82 million. That March, the Racquet and Tennis Club informally proposed the construction of a 38-story hotel above its clubhouse, to be designed by Jonathan Morse, a club member. This would have blocked most eastward views from Fisher Brothers' building. In August, the club submitted formal plans for a 35-story luxury hotel. As a result, in November 1978, Fisher Brothers opted not to accept the galleria bonus from the city, and it resumed negotiations with the Racquet and Tennis Club. The firm paid the club $5 million to not build the hotel, instead acquiring the clubhouse's air rights. This provided funding for the club's protection while also allowing Fisher Brothers to obtain the same amount of floor space that it would have received through the zoning bonus. The CPC gave Fisher Brothers permission to reduce the atrium's height in exchange for two additional office floors, the construction of which would pay for the air rights. Morse refused to say if the club had actually planned to act on the hotel proposal. Christopher Gray described the move as "perhaps the biggest game of real estate 'chicken' ever played in New York". The city also approved the proposed "Park Avenue Plaza" name.

==== Construction ====
In December 1978, the city government's Industrial and Commercial Incentive Board granted Fisher Brothers a $6.6 million tax abatement to be payable over ten years. The abatement was approved even though commission staff had privately recommended against it. The building was conceived as a speculative development without any anchor tenant in mind. A groundbreaking ceremony for the project was held in March 1979. At the time, 861,000 square feet (80,000 m^{2}) of office space had already been leased by insurance company Alexander & Alexander, financial-services firm First Boston, and management consultant McKinsey & Company. Alexander & Alexander ultimately canceled its lease, although First Boston took 16 floors and McKinsey took five floors. Fisher Brothers initially charged rents of $22 to $23 per square foot ($240 to $250/m^{2}), and the first tenants signed leases at these relatively low rates. Fisher Brothers then acquired the adjacent CBS Studio Building to protect westward views from the new tower. (Note: Fisher Brothers acquired the land under the CBS Studio Building in 1979, but it did not acquire the building itself until 1993.)

In the first phase of construction, workers poured concrete footings atop the bedrock, embedding steel bolts into the footings. Workers then bolted steel girders to the bolts, using two derricks to bolt the girders together as the superstructure rose. Accounting firm Main Hurdman & Cranstoun leased seven floors in the building in June 1979. By the end of that year, fashion firm Elizabeth Arden, Inc. had also agreed to occupy four floors. Though Park Avenue Plaza was about 10 percent complete at the time, nearly 90 percent of the space had been leased, with 150,000 ft^{2} (14,000 m^{2}) still available. As the superstructure was being erected, the contractors constructed corrugated steel decks on each story, then poured concrete over each of the corrugated-steel decks. Workers then sprayed a layer of fireproofing onto the superstructure. A group of demonstrators stormed the construction site in 1980, claiming that Fisher Brothers had not hired enough minority workers; one worker was injured during the protests.

=== 1980s and 1990s ===
The ground-floor atrium had opened by August 1981, and tenants had started to move into the building. The same year, Banque de Paris et des Pays Bas subleased some space from First Boston, and First Boston bought a 22% ownership stake in the tower. That September, Fisher Brothers reportedly negotiated to sell the building to a Middle Eastern investment group. The retail stores in the building's base were still not completed by early 1982. Because the building was about 100 feet west of Park Avenue, the United States Postal Service would not deliver mail addressed solely to "Park Avenue Plaza" unless it was also addressed to 55 East 52nd Street. This prompted Fisher Brothers to apply for a unique ZIP Code for the building, which required that the owners prove that the tenants would receive a high volume of mail. First Boston tasked several employees with estimating the volume of mail it would receive. Park Avenue Plaza ultimately received its own ZIP Code, which allowed the delivery of mail that was addressed solely to "Park Avenue Plaza".

By the mid-1980s, a Newsday writer said the atrium was one of several that was bringing "New York's shoppers in off the streets". The atrium had a cafe and several storefronts. The space also hosted exhibits such as a showcase of sheet music, as well as musical performances. Additionally, a large homeless encampment congregated in the atrium during its operating hours. First Boston sold back its ownership stake in the building to Fisher Brothers in late 1987 for $80 million, in part to raise money for employee bonuses. In exchange, the company agreed to pay higher rent. Park Avenue Plaza continued to attract financial firms, including Tokai Bank, which leased several floors in 1989.

First Boston occupied over a third of the building, paying over $60 per square foot ($650/m^{2}) until its lease expired in 1996. First Boston decided to move to 11 Madison Avenue, where the trading floors were more than twice as large as the 40,000 ft^{2} (3,700 m^{2}) trading floors at Park Avenue Plaza. The building's average rental rate was expected to decline following the relocation, making it harder for Fisher Brothers to pay off the $252 million that it still owed on the building's mortgage. Subsequently, Swiss Re leased six floors at the top of the building in late 1996. The next year, the city government gave tax incentives to financial group ING Barings if the company agreed to lease space at Park Avenue Plaza and add jobs during that period.

=== 2000s to present ===
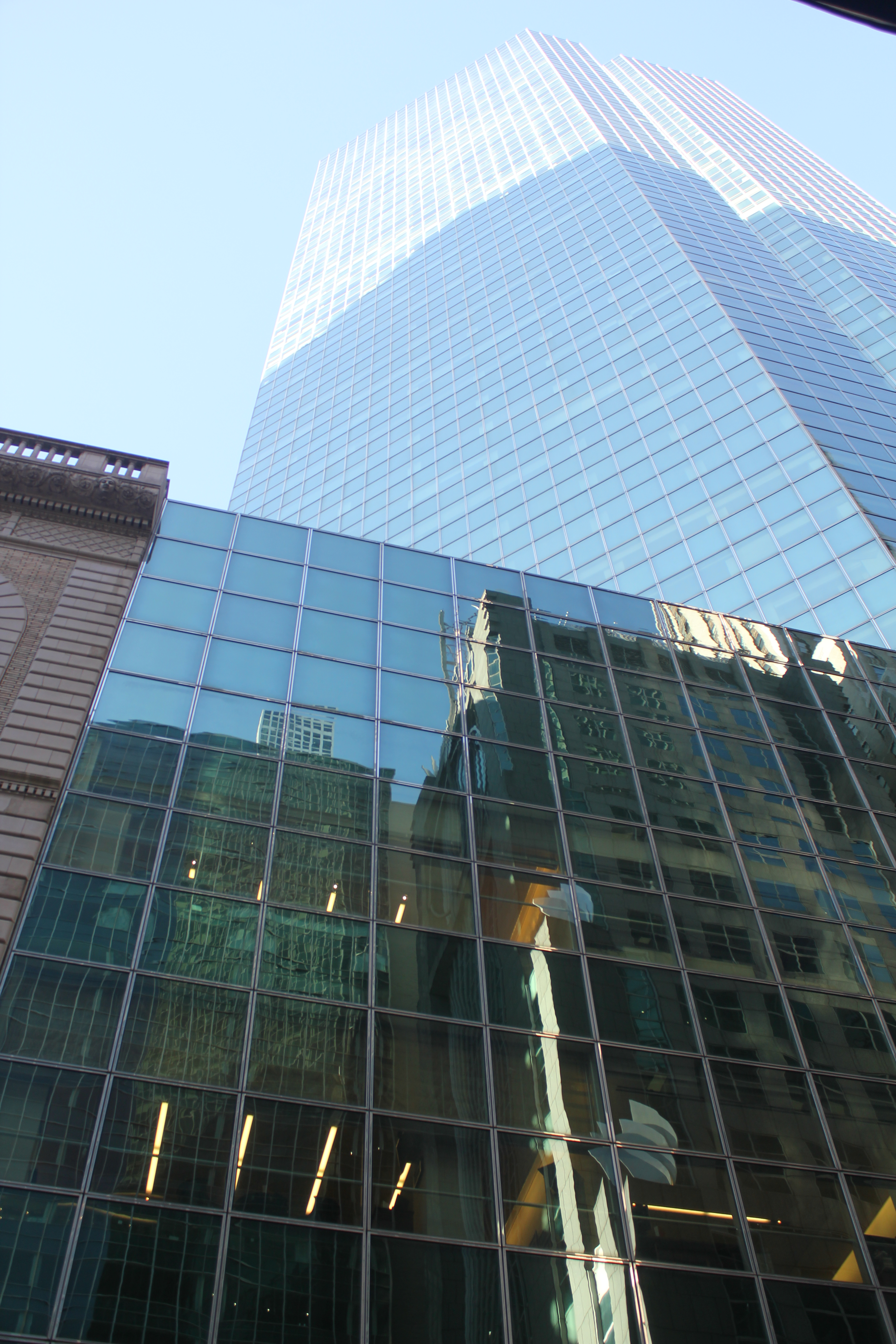
The 53rd Street elevation as seen from street level

Insurance company Aon relocated to Park Avenue Plaza in 2002 after the company's old headquarters were destroyed in the September 11 attacks the previous year. Aon moved its employees out of the building in 2006 but continued to sublease 270,000 ft^{2} (25,000 m^{2}) to other tenants. Another large tenant, ABN AMRO, also moved out around this time. These firms subleased space to companies such as investment management firm BlackRock, financial services company Evercore, and alternative asset management firm Fairfield Greenwich Group. Additionally, Intercontinental Exchange had some space in the building.

The Boston-based Rockpoint Group bought a 49 percent ownership stake in July 2010 for $330 million. The next year, Rockpoint sold its stake for $569.1 million to Chinese investment firm SOHO China, a firm controlled by Chinese real estate magnate Zhang Xin. As a result of these sales, the building's valuation increased from $695 million to $1.19 billion in a single year. In the mid-2010s, Janson Goldstein redesigned the atrium, which was renovated in 2016 for $40 million. The atrium continued to host events such as a design competition for Park Avenue. Fisher Brothers received a $75 million mezzanine loan from New York Life in 2018. At the time, Swiss Re had indicated its intent to move out of the building, as did McKinsey. BlackRock and Aon collectively leased nearly half of the building, but their leases expired in 2023. Concurrently, several other companies expanded their space in the building, including Evercore and General Atlantic.

Fisher Brothers temporarily removed the atrium's seats during the COVID-19 pandemic; the seating areas were restored by 2021. Jennison Associates also leased space at the building in early 2021, with plans to move into the building after BlackRock moved out. Fisher Brothers refinanced Park Avenue Plaza in October 2021 with a $575 million CMBS loan. The financing consisted of a $460 million interest-only loan from Morgan Stanley and a $115 million mezzanine loan, At the time, the building was 99 percent occupied with 11 tenants. Morgan Stanley leased 400,000 square feet (37,000 m^{2}) of BlackRock's space in January 2022, and Evercore expanded its space again in 2024. Zhang sought to sell her stake in the building by early 2026, at which point the structure was nearly fully occupied. In April 2026, Vornado Realty Trust bought SOHO China's 49% stake in the building, valued at about $1.1 billion.

== Reception ==
The photographer Marvin E. Newman took photographs of Park Avenue Plaza while it was under construction. In a 1981 exhibit of Newman's photographs, the Municipal Art Society described the building as "leaping with tyrannical self-confidence out of the middle of the block". After the building opened, Paul Goldberger wrote in 1982 that the building "is an earnest, if tame, example of the genre of the abstract tower that we are seeing more and more of around the country". The AIA Guide to New York City described the building as "a bulky glass prism". Conversely, architectural critic Martin Filler thought the building's facade was "virtually identical to those SOM has been producing for over 30 years", saying the material drew attention to Lever House, which by comparison "seems pathetically shrunken" by Park Avenue Plaza's presence.

Goldberger characterized the atrium in 1982 as "too small and tight in its feeling to be the enclosed public square that it aspires to be, but it is a lot more grandiose than the average lobby". Goldberger changed his stance several years later, saying: "Years of use have mellowed this space, and it has turned into one of the most viable indoor plazas we have." Richard F. Shepard wrote for The New York Times in 1989 that the atrium had a "warmth that almost contradicts its wall-size waterfall and its manicured interior architecture". Jerold Kayden described the atrium as "an elegant, two-story glass-enclosed space". According to Kayden, the space had all the elements of a successful public space because of its chairs and tables, eateries, waterfall, presence of maintenance staff, and "sense of security".
