= The History of Sound =

2025 film directed by Oliver Hermanus

- American theatrical release poster
- Directed by: Oliver Hermanus
- Screenplay by: Ben Shattuck
- Based on: "The History of Sound" and "Origin Stories" by Ben Shattuck
- Produced by: Sara Murphy; Andrew Kortschak; Lisa Ciuffetti; Thérèsa Ryan-Van Graan; Oliver Hermanus; Zhang Xin
- Starring: Paul Mescal; Josh O'Connor; Chris Cooper
- Cinematography: Alexander Dynan
- Edited by: Chris Wyatt
- Music by: Oliver Coates
- Production companies: Closer Media; Film4; Tango Entertainment; Storm City Films; End Cue; Fat City
- Distributed by: Mubi (United States and Canada); Universal Pictures and Focus Features (International)
- Release dates: May 21, 2025 (Cannes); September 12, 2025 (United States); January 23, 2026 (United Kingdom)
- Running time: 128 minutes
- Countries: United States; United Kingdom
- Language: English
- Box office: $3.2 million

The History of Sound is a 2025 period romance film directed by Oliver Hermanus and written by Ben Shattuck, who adapted his short stories "The History of Sound" and "Origin Stories". It follows the relationship between two men, played by Paul Mescal and Josh O'Connor, who meet in 1917 while attending the New England Conservatory of Music, and after World War I travel together recording folk songs of their countrymen in rural Maine in the winter of 1920.

The History of Sound had its world premiere at the 2025 Cannes Film Festival on May 21, where it competed for the Palme d'Or. It was released in the United States by Mubi on September 12.

== Plot ==
In 1917, New England Conservatory of Music student Lionel Worthing meets fellow student David White at a pub, where they instantly bond over their love of folk music before returning to David's apartment to have sex. As the two grow close, the United States enters World War I. The conservatory closes, David is drafted into the army and Lionel returns home to Kentucky. He sets music aside to tend to his family's farm after his father dies suddenly.

In 1919 Lionel receives a letter from David notifying him of his return from Europe and employment in a Maine college. He is set to embark on a department-funded trip across the state to collect folk songs on wax cylinders, and invites Lionel to assist him. The two reunite, rekindle their relationship, and travel around rural Maine, capturing folk songs from people of various walks of life. Eventually, they part ways again as David must return to work and Lionel plans to travel to Europe. Lionel corresponds with David via letters, only to stop writing after a year as he never receives a response.

In 1923 Lionel, now living in Rome, tells his lover Vincent of his dissatisfaction singing in a local choir and of his taking a job at the University of Oxford, ending their relationship on bad terms. A year later Lionel serves as conductor for the school's choir and is involved with student socialite Clarissa Roux, who invites him to meet her family at their country manor. During the trip, Lionel becomes overwhelmed with memories of David. The relationship with Clarissa also abruptly ends when Lionel must suddenly return to the United States due to his mother's grave illness. He comes home to find the house completely abandoned.

After putting his family's affairs in order, Lionel travels to Maine to find David, only to learn from a colleague that David had died some time after their trip and that his department never actually commissioned the song-collecting, leaving the location of the wax cylinders unknown. Lionel meets David's widow Belle, who reveals she knows who Lionel is. She explains how she and David met, and how David's death was a suicide as a result of shell shock from the war. She returns Lionel's letters and tells him she will send him the cylinders if they can be found. Lionel mourns David by visiting his favorite locations from youth and recounting a number of songs that endeared him to music, particularly "The Unquiet Grave".

In 1980 Lionel, now an ethnomusicologist, is promoting his newest book when a package containing the wax cylinders arrives at his doorstep, including one David made on the day of his death. On the recording, David apologizes to Lionel and thanks him for their time together before singing "Silver Dagger," the song Lionel sang to David when they first met.

== Cast ==
- Paul Mescal as Lionel Worthing
  - Chris Cooper as Older Lionel
- Josh O'Connor as David White
- Molly Price as Lionel's mother
- Raphael Sbarge as Lionel Worthing Sr.
- Hadley Robinson as Belle Sinclair
- Emma Canning as Clarissa Roux
- Emily Bergl as Mrs. Roux
- Briana Middleton as Thankful Mary Swain
- Gary Raymond as William Swain
- Alison Bartlett as Samantha
- Michael Schantz as Bob

== Production ==
The History of Sound originated with the production company End Cue, which found the short story of the same name in The Common, a literary journal based at Amherst College, and brought the project on board with author Ben Shattuck adapting his own work for the screen. Andrew Kortschak and Lisa Ciuffetti of End Cue structured the writer's deal and provided development financing to Shattuck. End Cue hired on Hermanus after the treatment stage of development. Kortschak, Ciuffetti and Hermanus guided Shattuck during the writing process just as the COVID-19 pandemic started, so much of the development occurred remotely between Los Angeles, Massachusetts and South Africa, with Hermanus participating during lockdown from his home in Barrydale, South Africa.

At the end of October 2021, the film was announced along with its leads Paul Mescal and Josh O'Connor. Producers include Ciuffetti, Kortschak, and Andrea Roa, as well as Tim Haslam for Embankment Films and Sara Murphy. Principal photography was originally going to take place on location in the United Kingdom, United States, and Italy in summer 2022, but was postponed because Mescal and O'Connor had scheduling conflicts. Production was rescheduled for after Hermanus completed Mary & George, starting in Massachusetts.

Production began on February 28, 2024. O'Connor learned to play the piano for his part; his scenes were filmed first, before he left to promote his film Challengers in April.

Crew allegedly attached to The History of Sound were spotted at the restaurant 10th & Willow in Hoboken, New Jersey, which was closed for filming in early March, and O'Connor and Mescal were photographed together in costume for the first time. Another New Jersey landmark that served as a filming location for The History of Sound is the Oakley Farm Museum in Freehold Township. The blacksmith shop, located at the rear of the property, was turned into a Maine cabin and visited by stars Mescal and O'Connor. The location was one of two in the entire state that End Cue and Film4 were seeking. In April 2024, production moved to Tarquinia, Italy.

== Release ==
In June 2024, it was reported the film would not be ready in time for the autumn festivals due to its score and sound production, and would instead aim for a 2025 Cannes Film Festival debut. In February 2025, Mubi and Focus Features/Universal Pictures International acquired North American and international distribution rights respectively. In April 2025, it was announced that the film would have its world premiere in competition at the Cannes Film Festival on 21 May 2025. The film was released in the United States on September 12, 2025. It had a targeted, limited theatrical run in select theatres as it was a specialty, prestige indie release by distributor Mubi. The film premiered in Canada on September 18, 2025, at Innis College.

== Reception ==
=== Critical response ===
On the review aggregator website Rotten Tomatoes, 69% of 143 critics' reviews are positive, with an average rating of 6.6/10. The website's consensus reads: "Its drawn-out pacing and overly familiar trajectory undermine its potential to truly surprise, but The History of Sound nonetheless offers a visually stunning and well-acted journey through its melancholic exploration of human connection." Metacritic, which uses a weighted average, assigned the film a score of 64 out of 100, based on 32 critics, indicating "generally favorable" reviews.

Davide Abbatescianni of Cineuropa described it as "a heartfelt, occasionally flawed, but ultimately moving film that navigates themes of intimacy, remembrance and cultural preservation through a uniquely melodic lens." Pavel Snapkou from Showbiz by PS wrote that the film may not appeal to everyone, but that "if you stay with it and let it unfold, the emotional undertow eventually hits hard."

On the German portal Programmkino.de, Dieter Oßwald praises the striking attention to detail in the set design and costumes. "The camera truly celebrates these authentic tableaux, capturing them in atmospherically powerful images. The film is also convincing in terms of acting. Irish actor Paul Mescal, often touted as the successor to 007, plays the sensitive hero as convincingly as he did in his Oscar-nominated performance in Aftersun following his appearance in Gladiator. Josh O'Connor, who is considered one of the best British actors of his generation for good reason, is similarly convincing and has a strong screen presence."

=== Accolades ===
Award	Date of ceremony	Category	Recipient(s)	Result	Ref.
Cannes Film Festival	24 May 2025	Palme d'Or	Oliver Hermanus	Nominated	
Cannes Film Festival	24 May 2025	Queer Palm	Oliver Hermanus	Nominated	
Miskolc International Film Festival	13 September 2025	Emeric Pressburger Prize	The History of Sound	Nominated	
