= Ashley St. Clair =

American political commentator (born 1998)

- St. Clair at the 2026 Venice Film Festival
- Born: July 31, 1998 (age 28); Florida, United States
- Occupations: Influencer; author; political commentator
- Children: 2

TikTok information
- Page: ashstc
- Followers: 302.5k

X information
- Followers: 1.1 million
- Last updated: September 13, 2026

Ashley St. Clair (born July 31, 1998) is an American influencer, author, and political commentator. She was an outspoken proponent of conservative and anti-transgender politics. However, approximately two years after having a child with Elon Musk, St. Clair denounced her previous anti-trans activism in January 2026.

== Career ==
St. Clair was a writer for the right-wing satirical news site The Babylon Bee and a brand ambassador for Turning Point USA until 2019, when she stepped down after being photographed with white nationalists Nick Fuentes and Tim Gionet. She appeared on Fox News in September 2023 to talk about declining birth rates. By January 2026, St. Clair had amassed over one million followers on Twitter.

St. Clair endorsed President Donald Trump in the 2024 election. She wrote the children's book Elephants Are Not Birds, which she billed as an unapologetic rebuke of transgender acceptance, and which was published by Christian conservative BRAVE Books. The book follows Kevin the Elephant as he "learns that even though he can sing, he is not a bird, even if Culture insists that he is".

=== Political shift ===
In January 2026, replying to a user on X who asked about her past transphobia, St. Clair wrote "I feel immense guilt for my role", adding that her past comments may have caused "my son's sister more pain", which outlets took as a reference to Musk's transgender daughter Vivian Wilson. She said she had been "trying incredibly hard privately to learn + advocate for those within the trans community that I've hurt". Musk responded by filing for full custody of their son, saying her apology implied she might try to "transition a one-year old boy". Also in January 2026, St. Clair self-identified as "dark woke". In an October 2026 interview with CNN, St. Clair confirmed she pays dues and is a member of the Democratic Socialists of America.

== Personal life ==
St. Clair was born in Florida and is Jewish through her mother. St. Clair has two children: her son with Musk, and another son from a previous relationship. She resides in New York City.

=== Relationship with Elon Musk ===
St. Clair said Musk first messaged her on X, and they began dating in 2023 after she interviewed him for The Babylon Bee. She gave birth to Musk's son in 2024. Musk's name was left off the child's birth certificate, which St. Clair agreed to at the request of his adviser Jared Birchall. She said Musk had acknowledged paternity in writing and had seen their son only three times, last on November 30, 2024.

On February 14, 2025, St. Clair announced that Musk was the father of her son. On March 31, she sold her Tesla, saying Musk had cut child support by 60% to punish her for "disobedience". Musk denied that he had "financially retaliated" against their son, saying he did not know if the child was his but had given her $2.5 million and was sending $500,000 a year. In April 2025, The Wall Street Journal reported that a paternity test showed Musk was the father. St. Clair announced she was starting a podcast, saying she needed to do so to avoid an imminent eviction.

St. Clair became a target of online abuse. After X rolled out a Grok image-editing feature, St. Clair said users made sexualised deepfakes of her, including from a photo of her at 14, and that X ignored her reports; several were removed after The Guardian asked X for comment. X said it removes illegal content and permanently suspends accounts that post it. In January 2026, she filed suit in New York State against xAI for punitive and compensatory damages.

In September 2026, The Daily Telegraph reported that St. Clair had rejected a $40 million offer from Musk to sign a non-disclosure agreement, so that she could appear in a new documentary film by Alex Gibney titled Musk which premiered at the 83rd Venice International Film Festival on September 8, 2026. Musk denied it, writing that "she was never offered that and has a history of making false claims", and said the film's interviewees "either have an axe to grind or don't even know me". In April 2025, The Wall Street Journal had reported that Musk offered her $15 million plus $100,000 a month in exchange for her silence.

== See also ==
- 2020s anti-LGBTQ movement in the United States
- Persecution of transgender people under the second Trump administration
