= New England Studios =

Film studio in Devens, Massachusetts

Coordinates: 42°32′22″N 71°37′46″W

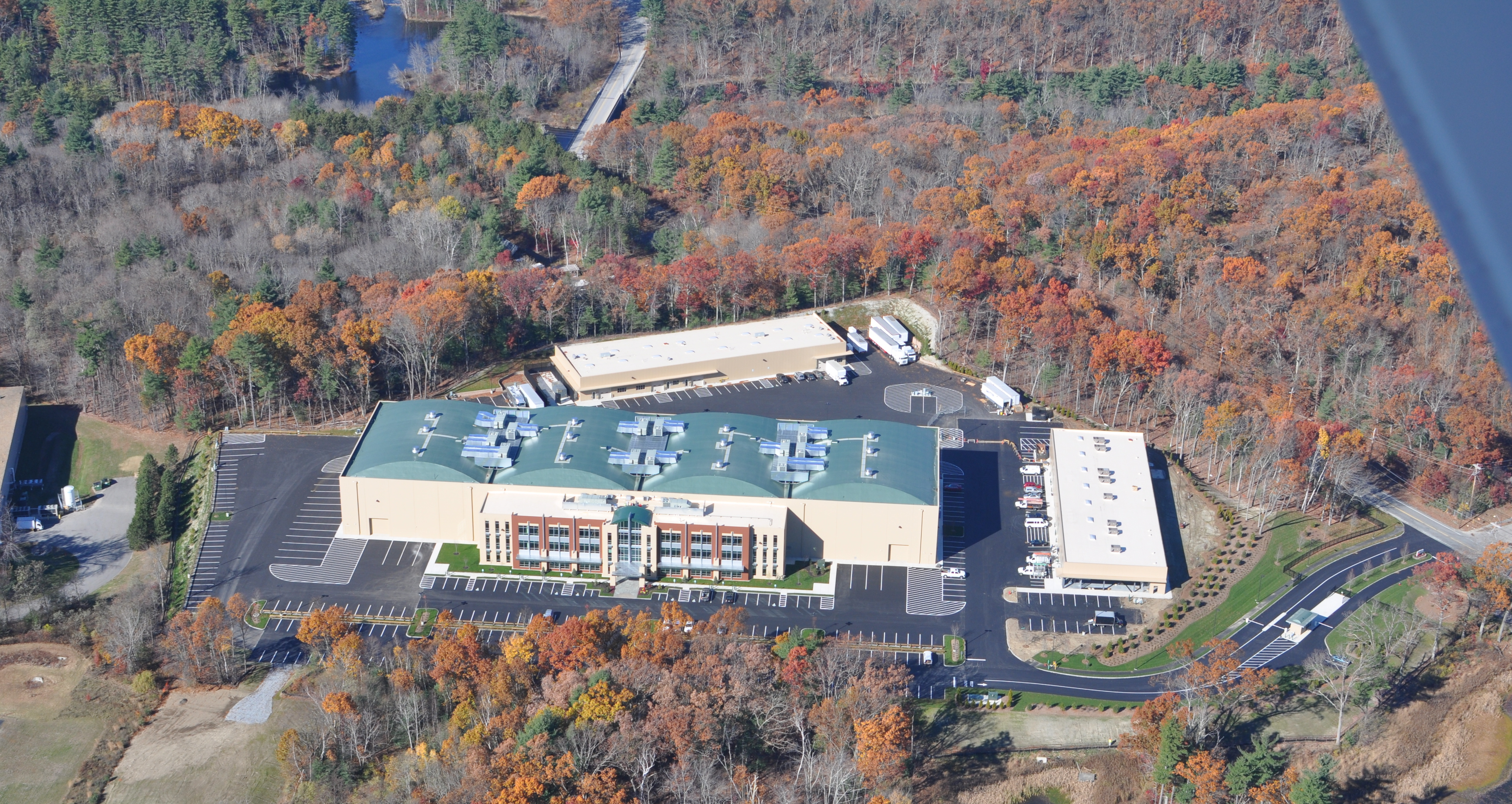
Aerial view

New England Studios is a film production facility located in Devens, Massachusetts. Established in 2012, it has quickly become a prominent hub for the film and television industry in the New England region. The studio is known for its modern facilities, versatile soundstages, central location in New England, and on-site rental department.

== History ==
New England Studios was founded with the goal of offering a state-of-the-art production space outside of traditional film centers like Hollywood. Construction of the studio began in 2012, and it officially opened its doors to filmmakers and production teams in 2014. The strategic location in Devens offers access to both urban and natural settings, providing filmmakers with diverse shooting locations within a short distance.

== Facilities ==
NE Studios is built on 15.7 acres of secluded land in Devens, MA.

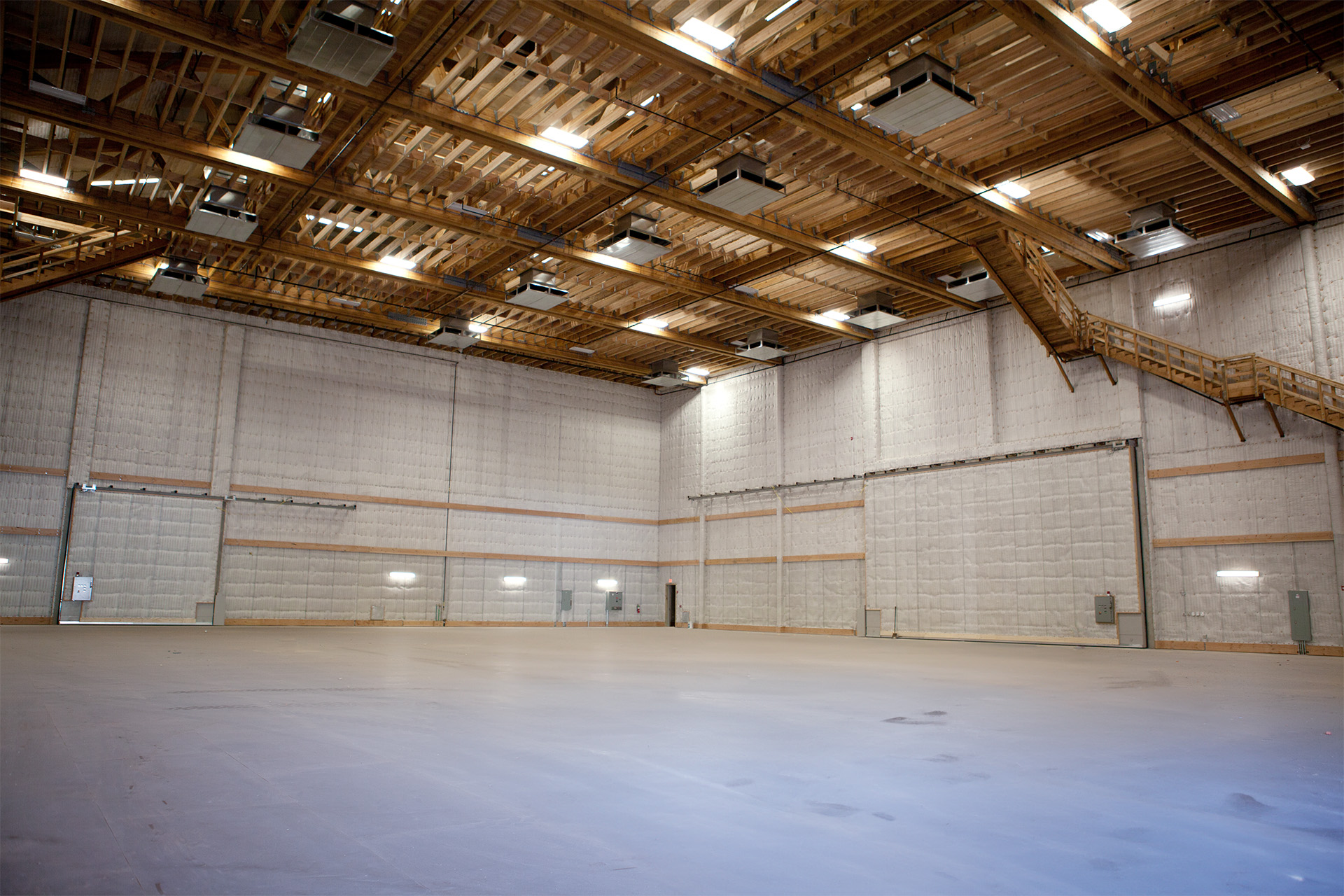
Stage Interior

=== Sound stages ===
- (4) 18,000 Square Foot Stages.
- 46’ Working Height to the Perms
- NC25 Rated Sound Proofing
- 20’x20’ Exterior Elephant Doors
- 42’x24’ Interior Elephant Doors (To Connect Parallel Stages)
- (6) 1,200 Amp 3-Phase Power Services Per Stage
- 120 Tons of Silent Heat and Cooling Per Stage
- Nail-able Flooring
- Wooden Catwalk and Perms

=== Mill space ===
- (4) 2,500 Square Foot Areas
- (2) 5,000 Square Foot Commissaries
- (2) 6,500 Square Foot Construction Mill Space

=== Office space ===
- (2) 10,000 Square Foot Floors of Office Space

== Notable productions ==
These productions either shot on stage and/or G&E equipment packages were provided.

=== 2026 ===
- Widow's Bay

=== 2024 ===
- Madame Web
- 'Salem's Lot
- The Parenting
- Janet Planet

=== 2023 ===
- The Holdovers
- American Fiction
- Boston Strangler
- Finest Kind

=== 2022 ===
- Julia
- Spirited
- Hocus Pocus 2
- Confess, Fletch

=== 2021 ===
- CODA
- Dexter: New Blood
- Don't Look Up
- The Tender Bar
- The Unholy
- Free Guy
- John and the Hole
- Black Friday

=== 2020 ===
- Defending Jacob
- Godmothered
- Joyner Lucas – "Will"
- Dead Reckoning

=== 2019 ===
- Little Women
- The Society
- Jungleland

=== 2018 ===
- Castle Rock
- Father of the Year
- The Equalizer 2
- Super Troopers 2
- Slender Man
- The Possession of Hannah Grace
- The Witch in the Window
- Enemies: The President, Justice and the FBI
- Ghost Light
- Grace

=== 2017 ===
- Daddy's Home 2
- Abe & Phil's Last Poker Game

=== 2016 ===
- Central Intelligence
- America's Test Kitchen - Season 17
- Chicken People

=== 2015 ===
- Tumbledown
- The Mind's Eye
