= In Restless Dreams: The Music of Paul Simon =

2023 two-part documentary film

- Film poster
- Directed by: Alex Gibney
- Produced by: Alex Gibney; Erin Edeiken; Svetlana Zill; David Rahtz
- Cinematography: Benjamin Bloodwell
- Edited by: Andy Grieve
- Production companies: Jigsaw Productions; Closer Media; Anonymous Content
- Distributed by: MGM+
- Release date: September 9, 2023 (TIFF)
- Running time: 219 minutes
- Country: United States
- Language: English

In Restless Dreams: The Music of Paul Simon is a 2023, two-part documentary film about Paul Simon, directed by Alex Gibney. The film premiered at the Toronto International Film Festival in September 2023 and had its U.S. premiere at the Hamptons International Film Festival in October 2023. The two-part film premiered on the streaming service MGM+ on March 17 and March 24, 2024. On October 13, 2024 (Paul Simon's 83rd birthday), the film was shown in selected cinemas across the United Kingdom and Ireland.

== Reception ==
On the review aggregator website Rotten Tomatoes, 95% of 20 critics' reviews are positive, with an average rating of 7.9/10. The website's consensus reads: "Reflecting on Paul Simon's current life as much as it looks back on his illustrious career, In Restless Dreams proves to be a movingly complete portrait of an artist." Metacritic, which uses a weighted average, assigned the film a score of 80 out of 100, based on 7 critics, indicating "generally favorable" reviews.
