= Commune by the Great Wall =

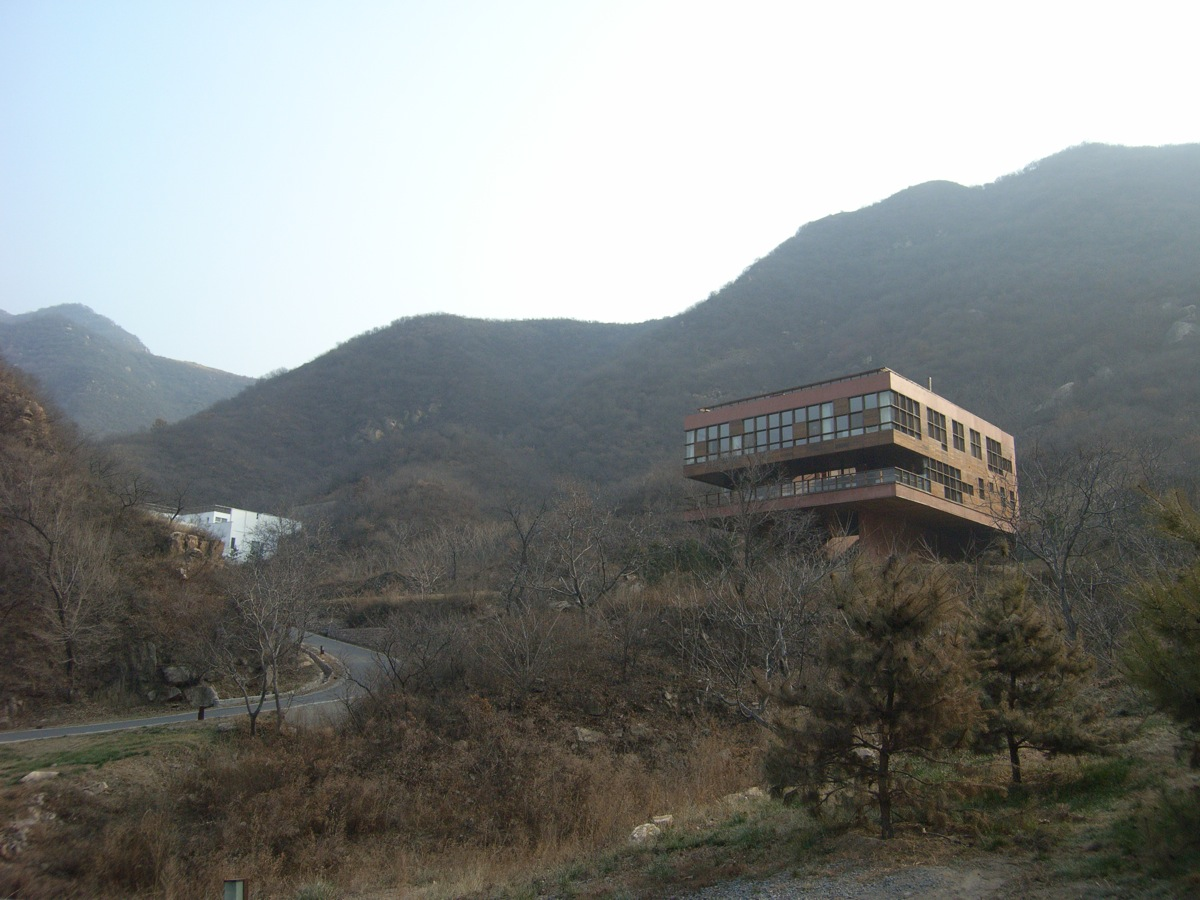
- Commune by the Great Wall
- Simplified Chinese: 城脚下的公社
- Traditional Chinese: 城腳下的公社
- Literal meaning: Commune under the foot of the Great Wall
Transcriptions
Standard Mandarin
- Hanyu Pinyin: Chéng Jiǎoxià de Gōngshè

The Commune by the Great Wall (Chinese: 长城脚下的公社) is a SOHO China-managed boutique hotel, in Yanqing District, Beijing, China.

== Description ==
The Commune by the Great Wall is near the Badaling section of the Great Wall. The Commune consists of private villas designed by twelve Asian architects. Its clubhouse and villas are in a valley totaling eight square kilometers. It also houses corporate functions, weddings, film shoots, and fashion shows. Its furniture and interior decoration were designed by Serge Mouille, Philippe Starck, Karim Rashid, Matthew Hilton, Marc Newson, and Michael Young.

== Awards ==
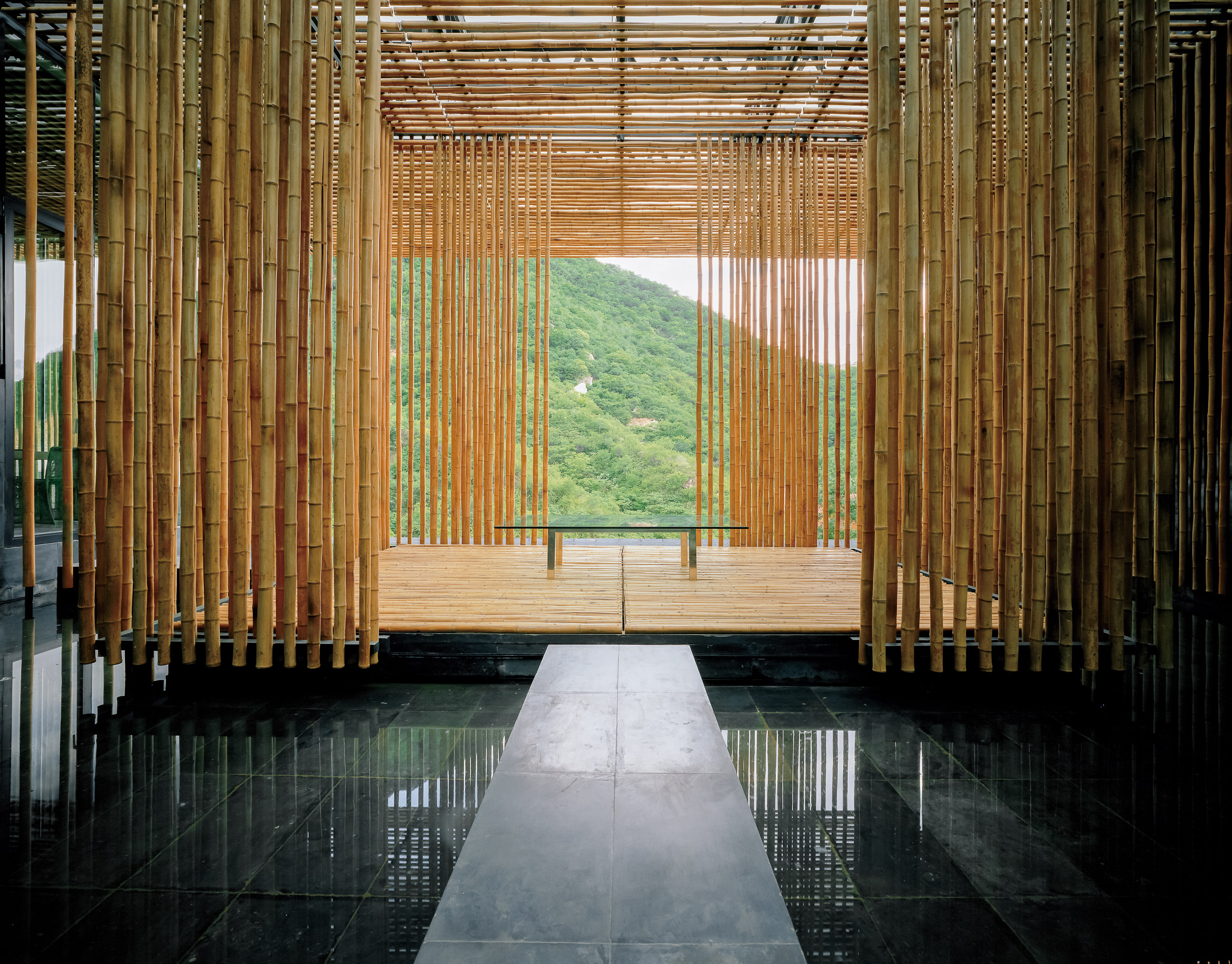
Interior of the Commune by the Great Wall

The hotel's architecture was exhibited at La Biennale di Venezia in 2002 and was bestowed a special prize. Zhang Xin, the project's creator and investor, was recognized for her "bold personal initiative". Centre Pompidou, in Paris, houses the exhibited model, as its first permanent collection from China.
