= Citizen K =

2019 documentary film

- Release poster
- Directed by: Alex Gibney
- Produced by: John Battsek; Alex Gibney; P. J. van Sandwijk; George Chignell; Erin Edeiken
- Cinematography: Mark Garrett; Denis Sinyakov
- Edited by: Michael J. Palmer
- Music by: Robert Logan; Ivor Guest
- Distributed by: Greenwich Entertainment
- Release date: 22 November 2019
- Running time: 128 minutes
- Languages: English, Russian
- Box office: $145,969

Citizen K is a 2019 documentary film about Mikhail Khodorkovsky, written and directed by Alex Gibney. It is a film about post-Soviet Russia featuring Khodorkovsky, Anton Drel, Maria Logan, Alexei Navalny, Tatyana Lysova, Leonid Nevzlin, Igor Malashenko and Derk Sauer.

Citizen K was financed by Amazon. It had its world premiere at Venice Film Festival and was part of the official selection at Venice Film Festival, Toronto International Film Festival and BFI London Film Festival. It received generally positive reviews from critics.

== Reception ==
=== Critical response ===
On the review aggregator website Rotten Tomatoes, 95% of 59 critics' reviews are positive, with an average rating of 7.7/10. The website's consensus reads: "Citizen K sees documentarian Alex Gibney training his sights on post-Soviet Russia, with engrossing -- and unsettling -- results." Metacritic, which uses a weighted average, assigned the film a score of 76 out of 100, based on 19 critics, indicating "generally favorable" reviews.

=== Accolades ===
Gibney received a nomination at the 72nd Writers Guild of America Awards for Best Documentary Screenplay, losing the award to his own film The Inventor: Out for Blood in Silicon Valley.
