= Closer Media =

American film production company

- Type: Private
- Industry: Film industry
- Founded: 2021; 5 years ago
- Founder: Zhang Xin
- Headquarters: New York, New York, U.S.
- Area served: United States
- Website: closermedia.com

Closer Media is an American film production company founded in 2021 by Zhang Xin. The company has produced Ezra (2023), The Monk and the Gun (2023), In Restless Dreams: The Music of Paul Simon (2023), The History of Sound (2025), and Couture (2025).

== History ==
In 2021, Zhang Xin founded Closer Media, a production company which will produce and finance narrative films and television and documentaries. The company's first films were The Monk and the Gun directed by Pawo Choyning Dorji and Ezra directed by Tony Goldwyn. In 2024, the company announced that they made an investment in global streaming platform and film distributor Mubi and that Zhang would join the board.

In September 2026, Dan Guando joined the company as the Executive Vice President. It was also announced that the company signed a multi-year deal with Blumhouse Atomic Monster. The companies would develop and co-finance a slate of lower-budgeted original films.

== Filmography ==
=== 2020s ===
Release Date	Title	Notes
February 2, 2024	The Monk and the Gun	distributed by Roadside Attractions
May 31, 2024	Ezra	distributed by Bleecker Street
September 12, 2025	The History of Sound	distributed by Mubi
October 10, 2025	Orwell: 2+2=5	distributed by Neon
October 24, 2025	Last Days	Distributed by Vertical
June 26, 2026	Couture	distributed by Vertical
August 12, 2026	An Eye for an Eye	distributed by Jolt

=== Upcoming ===
Release Date	Title	Notes
September 4, 2026	Teenage Wasteland	distributed by Netflix
October 16, 2026	Musk	distributed by Bleecker Street and HBO Documentary Films
TBA	Useful Idiots	
