= The Dark Money Game =

2025 documentary miniseries

- Genre: Documentary
- Directed by: Alex Gibney

Production
- Production company: HBO

Original release
- Network: HBO
- Release: April 15 – April 16, 2025

The Dark Money Game is a 2025 two-part documentary miniseries directed by Alex Gibney which explores the use of dark money in United States politics.

== Production ==
The project was inspired by Jane Mayer's book Dark Money: The Hidden History of the Billionaires Behind the Rise of the Radical Right. It features interviews with journalists, lawmakers, judges, FBI investigators, whistleblowers, and insiders.

== Release ==
The first film, Ohio Confidential, premiered on April 15, 2025. The second film, Wealth of the Wicked, premiered on April 16, 2025.

== Episodes ==
- "Ohio Confidential" - covers the Ohio nuclear bribery scandal
- "Wealth of the Wicked" - traces the history of campaign finance law in the United States, focusing on the influence of super PACs and religious groups, as well as the fine line between bribes and donations within the political process

== Reception ==
Eric Deggans of NPR stated, "For anyone worried about how gerrymandering and one-party dominance of legislatures may have made it easier for politicians to ignore the will of the people, Gibney's films offer a potent argument tracing the problem to an avalanche of dark money easily hidden from the public's view." Daniel Fienberg of The Hollywood Reporter commented that "This is important stuff, but unfortunately it is not good storytelling from a filmmaker who, far more often than not, knows from good storytelling."
