= Enemies: The President, Justice and the FBI =

American documentary series

- Release poster
- Based on: Enemies: A History of the FBI by Tim Weiner
- Showrunner: Sarah Dowland
- Directed by: Jed Rothstein; Alex Gibney
- No. of episodes: 4

Production
- Executive producers: Alex Gibney; Stacey Offman; Richard Perello; Sarah Dowland; Vinnie Malhotra
- Producers: Svetlana Zill; Sarit G. Work; Emily S. Chapman
- Production companies: Jigsaw Productions; Showtime Networks

Original release
- Network: Showtime
- Release: November 18 – December 9, 2018

Enemies: The President, Justice and the FBI is a four-part documentary television series by Showtime about the history of the relationship between U.S. presidents and the Federal Bureau of Investigation, inspired by Tim Weiner's book Enemies: A History of the FBI.

== Reception ==
The review aggregator website Rotten Tomatoes holds a 100% approval rating based on five critic reviews. Metacritic, which uses a weighted average, gave a score of 76 out of 100 based on four critics, indicating "generally favorable" reviews.
