= Zoë Schiffer =

American technology journalist (born 1992)

- Schiffer in 2026
- Born: 1992 (age 33–34)
- Education: University of California, Berkeley (BA); Stanford University (MA)
- Occupations: Author; Journalist
- Children: 1

Zoë Schiffer (born 1992) is an American technology journalist and author. She oversees business and industry coverage at Wired and previously served as managing editor of Platformer, the tech newsletter founded by Casey Newton, and as a senior reporter at The Verge.

== Early life and education ==
Schiffer grew up in Mission Canyon, California, a suburb outside Santa Barbara. Her parents are Howard Schiffer, the founder of the nonprofit Vitamin Angels, and Kim Schiffer, a chef. In 2009, her family's home was consumed by the Jesusita Fire.

She attended Seattle University, then the University of California, Berkeley, graduating with a Bachelor of Arts in political science. She earned a Master of Arts in journalism from Stanford University in 2019.

== Career ==
Schiffer started her career as a tech employee, working as a content manager and UX writer for Uber. She then began reporting freelance for publications including Vox and the San Francisco Chronicle. While in graduate school, she reported on tech for KQED-FM.

Schiffer became a reporter at The Verge in 2019, focusing on labor movements in Silicon Valley. She uncovered a growing culture of discontent among Apple employees regarding the company's working conditions and secretive corporate culture. The CEO of the luggage brand Away resigned following Schiffer's 2019 investigation into the company's work environment. Schiffer briefly left The Verge in 2021 to join the tech investigations team at NBC News, but returned two months later as a senior reporter.

In 2022, she became managing editor of fellow Verge alumnus Casey Newton's newsletter Platformer. In January 2023, Schiffer, Newton, and The Verge editor Alex Heath wrote a cover story for New York magazine on Elon Musk's acquisition of Twitter. Platformer became a leading source on Musk's acquisition and its aftermath; Schiffer later said the newsletter was "getting literally thousands of new subscribers every single month by writing about Elon Musk." The debacle became the topic of Schiffer's first book, Extremely Hardcore: Inside Elon Musk’s Twitter, published in February 2024. Later that year, Wired hired Schiffer as director of business and industry, a newsroom leadership position.

== Personal life ==
Schiffer lives in Santa Barbara. She is married and has a daughter.
