= Alex Gibney =

American film director and producer (born 1953)

- Gibney in 2026
- Born: Philip Alexander Gibney; October 23, 1953 (age 73); New York City, New York, U.S.
- Education: Yale University (BA); University of California, Los Angeles (attended)
- Years active: 1980–present
- Relatives: Frank Gibney (father)

Philip Alexander Gibney (/ˈɡɪbni/; born October 23, 1953) is an American documentary film director and producer. In 2010, Esquire magazine described Gibney as "becoming the most important documentarian of our time."

Gibney's works as director include The Inventor: Out for Blood in Silicon Valley (2019), Going Clear: Scientology and the Prison of Belief (winner of three Emmys in 2015), We Steal Secrets: The Story of Wikileaks (2013), Mea Maxima Culpa: Silence in the House of God (winner of three 2013 primetime Emmy awards), Enron: The Smartest Guys in the Room (nominated in 2005 for Academy Award for Best Documentary Feature); Client 9: The Rise and Fall of Eliot Spitzer (short-listed in 2011 for the Academy Award for Best Documentary Feature), Casino Jack and the United States of Money, and Taxi to the Dark Side (2007) (winner of the 2007 Academy Award for Best Documentary Feature), focusing on a taxi driver in Afghanistan who was tortured and killed at Bagram Air Base in 2002.

In 2019 he released his documentary Citizen K, about Russian President Vladimir Putin and the Russian billionaire exile Mikhail Khodorkovsky.

Musk, a documentary film about businessman Elon Musk, was released in October 2026.

== Life and career ==
Gibney was born in New York City, the son of Harriet (Harvey) and journalist Frank Gibney. He has one brother. His stepfather was William Sloane Coffin. After attending Pomfret School, Gibney earned his bachelor's degree from Yale University and studied toward a Master of Fine Arts at UCLA Film School.

Gibney developed an anti-authoritarian view from the journalism career of his father: "They say to succeed you're supposed to suck up and kick down. Well, he was the classic guy who sucked down and kicked up, which is never a good career path! He was at Time, then fired. At Newsweek, fired. At Life, fired." His stepfather was equally an influence on him. "There was something about my father, my mother, and then my stepfather, I think they all ruddered against authority in their own peculiar ways. And that probably rubbed off on me, too."

He served as executive producer of the documentary No End in Sight (2007). His film Gonzo: The Life and Work of Dr. Hunter S. Thompson (2008) is a documentary based on the life of Hunter S. Thompson and his "Gonzo" style of journalism. Under executive producer Martin Scorsese, Gibney was series producer for the PBS television series The Blues (2003) (producing individual episodes directed by Wim Wenders and Charles Burnett) and writer-producer of The Pacific Century (1992) (that won the News & Documentary Emmy for Outstanding Historical Program). Several films he directed and/or produced have been screened at the Cannes, Sundance, Toronto and Tribeca Film Festivals.

In an interview with Robert K. Elder for The Film That Changed My Life, Gibney credits much influence on his filming style to The Exterminating Angel:

[The Exterminating Angel is] dark, but it's also wickedly funny and mysterious in ways that can't be reduced to a simple, analytical explanation. I always thought that's what's great about movies sometimes—the best movies have to be experienced; they can't just be written about.

In an interview with David Poland for MIFF, Gibney disagrees with the view from nowhere, the idea that journalists can be objective:

"Objectivity is dead. There's no such thing as objectivity. When you're making a film, a film can't be objective.

Gibney frequently employs a narrative strategy akin to that of Ken Burns in which the filmmaker relies on testimony from those involved in the events recounted together with voice-over narration.

Gibney's Taxi to the Dark Side premiered at the 2007 Tribeca Film Festival where it won Best Documentary. The film probes the killing of a taxi driver named Dilawar at Bagram Air Force Base in Afghanistan.

On June 19, 2008, Gibney's company filed for arbitration, arguing that THINKFilm failed to properly distribute and promote his film Taxi to the Dark Side. He sued for more than a million dollars in damages and stated that the film has grossed only $280,000.

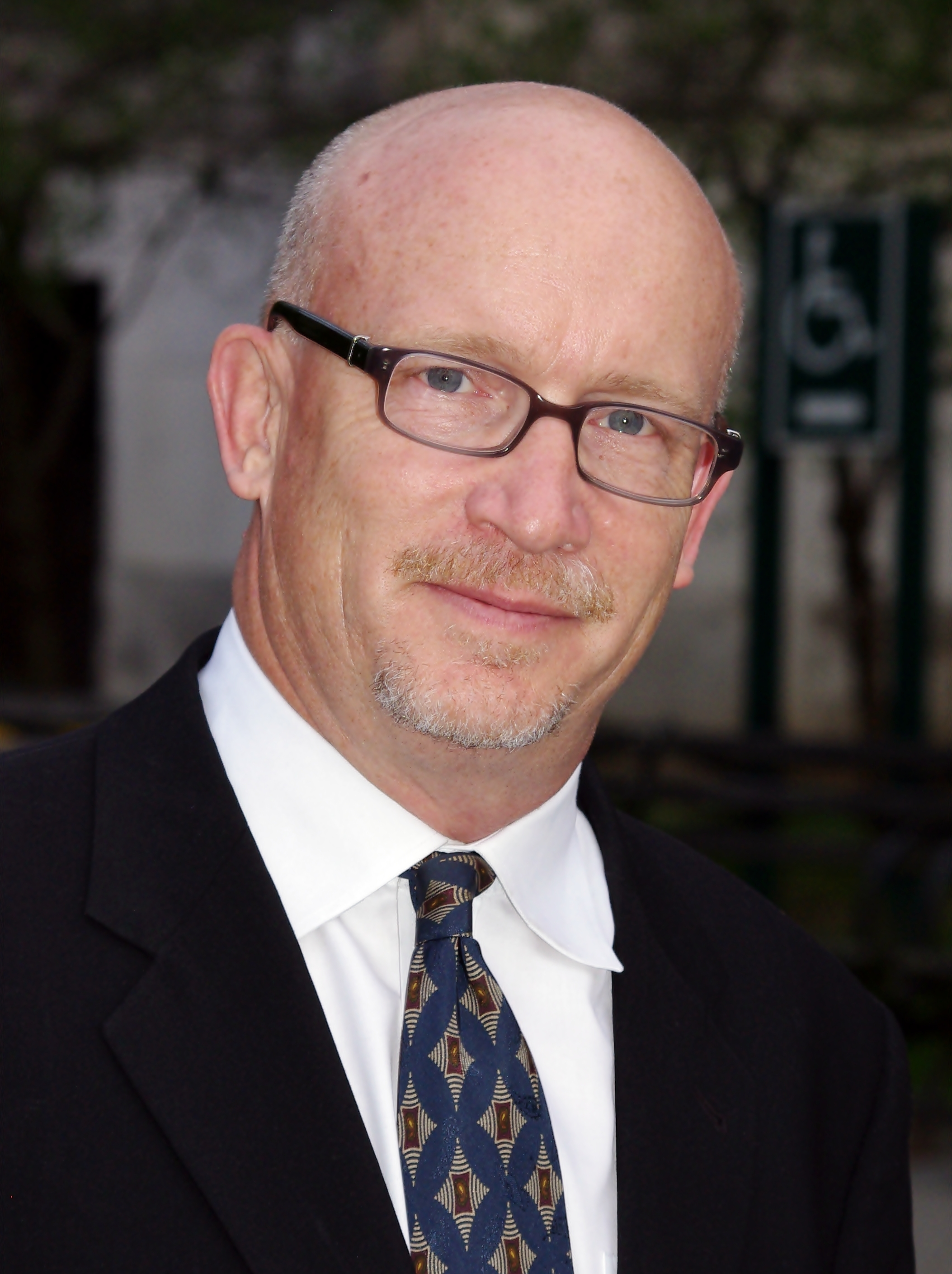
Gibney in 2011

Gibney is president of Jigsaw Productions, which produces independent films, documentaries, and television series. On June 16, 2020, Imagine Entertainment, a film, television and documentary production company run by Brian Grazer and Ron Howard, invested in and acquired an ownership stake in the company. Gibney has been honored by the Yale Film Studies program for his contributions to film culture. In 2010, Utne Reader listed him as one of "25 Visionaries Who Are Changing Your World".

His 2013 film We Steal Secrets: The Story of WikiLeaks, is a comprehensive look at WikiLeaks, Julian Assange, and Chelsea Manning. The Wikileaks organization itself has objected to the way Gibney portrayed it, and has posted a line-by-line rebuttal to the entire film. Gibney posted a rebuttal.

In 2015, Gibney received the inaugural Hitchens Prize, awarded in honor of the late writer Christopher Hitchens. Gibney had previously collaborated with Hitchens on a documentary film adaptation of Hitchens's book The Trial of Henry Kissinger.

Gibney's projects during the 2010s include work on The Armstrong Lie (about Lance Armstrong), Catching Hell (a contribution to ESPN's '30 for 30' series that looks at "The Inning" in Game 6 of the 2003 National League Championship Series), Going Clear (a documentary about Scientology), Dirty Money (doc-series that explores corporate greed and corruption), The Looming Tower (fiction series based on the book by Lawrence Wright of which he directed the pilot), and The Inventor: Out for Blood in Silicon Valley, that premiered at Sundance 2019.

In 2023, Gibney showed the first part of two-part documentary at the Berlin film festival entitled Boom! Boom! The World vs. Boris Becker, concerning the life of troubled German tennis star Boris Becker. In March 2023, he announced that he was “several months” into a documentary film entitled Musk, about entrepreneur Elon Musk.

Alex Gibney produced The Bibi Files, a 2024 documentary directed by Alexis Bloom that investigates the corruption charges against Israeli Prime Minister Benjamin Netanyahu.

In 2024, it was reported that Gibney and Anonymous Content were working on a documentary on Luigi Mangione, the shooter who killed the UnitedHealthCare CEO Brian Thompson.

Gibney writes for The Atlantic, and has written for Huffington Post and other publications.

== Personal life ==
Gibney has been a resident of Summit, New Jersey, and, as of 2025, lives in New Harbor, Maine.

== Filmography (as director) ==
- The Ruling Classroom (1980)
- Manufacturing Miracles (1988)
- Inside Japan, Inc. (1992)
- The Fifties (1997), television mini-series documentary
- AFI's 100 Years... 100 Movies: Love Crazy (1998; TV special documentary)
- The Sexual Century: Sexual Explorers (1999; TV movie)
- The Sexual Century: The Sexual Revolution (1999; TV movie)
- Jimi Hendrix and the Blues (2001)
- Enron: The Smartest Guys in the Room (2005; documentary)
- 3 Doors Down: Away from the Sun, Live from Houston, Texas (2005)
- Behind Those Eyes (2005; documentary)
- Time Piece (segment "Empire of the Pushcarts") (2006; documentary)
- The Human Behavior Experiments (2006; TV movie documentary)
- Taxi to the Dark Side (2007; documentary)
- Gonzo: The Life and Work of Dr. Hunter S. Thompson (2008; documentary)
- Casino Jack and the United States of Money (2010; documentary)
- My Trip to Al Qaeda (2010; documentary)
- Freakonomics (segment Pure Corruption) (2010; documentary)
- Client 9: The Rise and Fall of Eliot Spitzer (2010; documentary)
- Magic Trip: Ken Kesey's Search for a Kool Place (2011; documentary)
- Catching Hell (2011; ESPN Films documentary)
- The Last Gladiators (2011)
- Mea Maxima Culpa: Silence in the House of God (2012; documentary)
- Park Avenue: Money, Power and the American Dream (2012; documentary)
- We Steal Secrets: The Story of WikiLeaks (2013; documentary)
- The Armstrong Lie (2013; documentary)
- Finding Fela (2014; documentary)
- Ceasefire Massacre (2014) ESPN 30 for 30: Soccer Stories
- Fields of Fear (2014) ESPN 30 for 30 Short
- Mr. Dynamite: The Rise of James Brown (2014; documentary)
- Going Clear: Scientology and the Prison of Belief (2015; documentary)
- Steve Jobs: The Man in the Machine (2015; documentary)
- Sinatra: All or Nothing at All (2015; TV mini-series documentary)
- Zero Days (2016; documentary)
- Cooked (2016; miniseries, episode "Fire")
- Billions (2017; TV series, episode "Optimal Play")
- No Stone Unturned (2017; documentary)
- Rolling Stone: Stories From The Edge (2017; documentary)
- Dirty Money (2018; TV series documentary, episode "Hard Nox")
- The Looming Tower (2018; TV mini-series, episode "Now it Begins...")
- Enemies: The President, Justice and the FBI (2018; TV series documentary, episode "You're Fired")
- The Inventor: Out for Blood in Silicon Valley (2019; documentary)
- Citizen K (2019; documentary)
- Crazy, Not Insane (2020; documentary)
- Agents of Chaos (2020; documentary)
- Totally Under Control (2020; documentary)
- The Crime of the Century (2021; documentary)
- The Forever Prisoner (2021; documentary)
- Boom! Boom! The World vs. Boris Becker (2023: two-part documentary)
- In Restless Dreams: The Music of Paul Simon (2023)
- Wise Guy: David Chase and the Sopranos (2024)
- The Dark Money Game (2025)
- Knife: The Attempted Murder of Salman Rushdie (2026)
- Musk (2026)
