= SOHO China =

Office real-estate developer in China

SOHO China SOHO中国

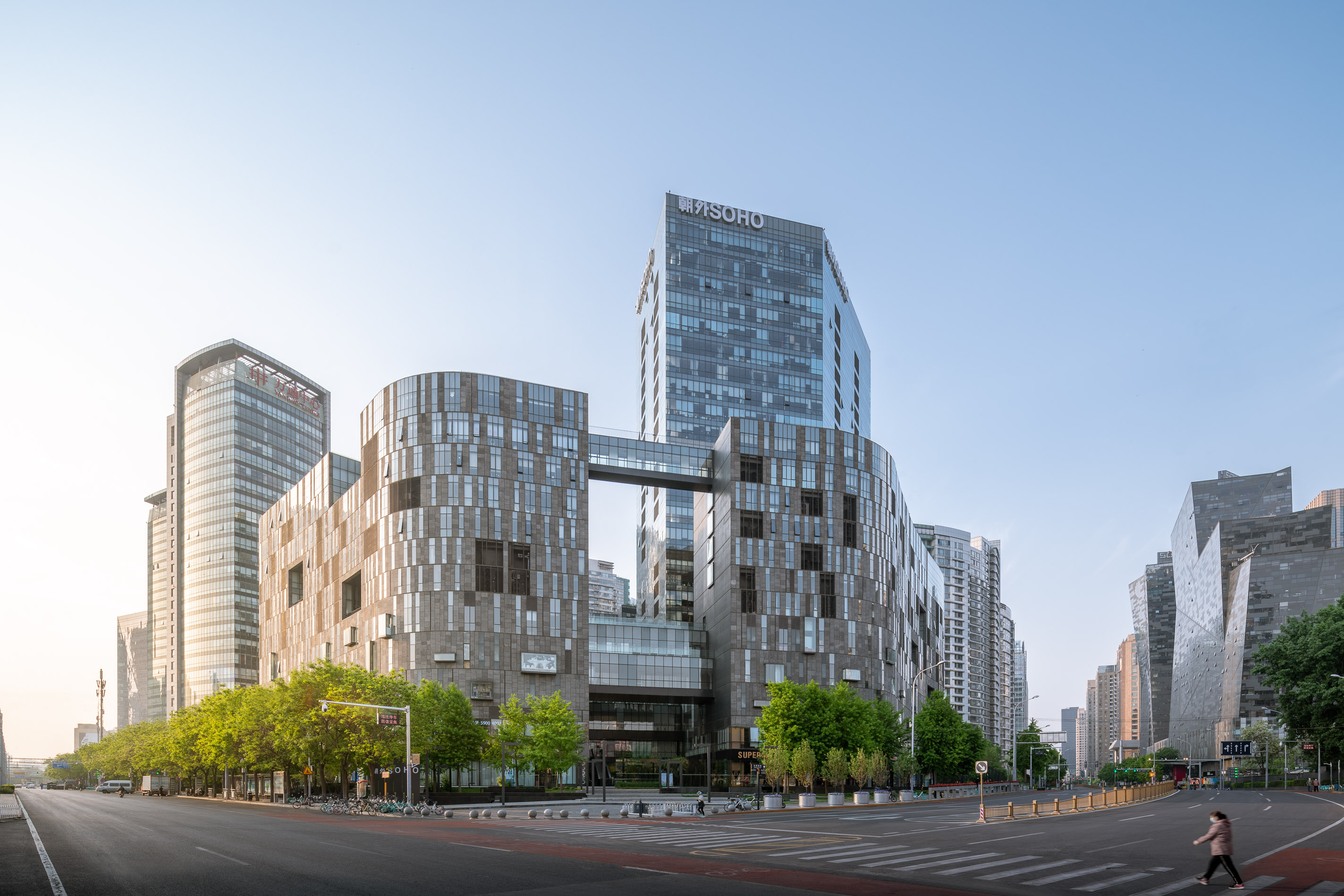
- Head offices of SOHO China
- Type: Public
- Traded as: SEHK: 410
- ISIN: KYG826001003
- Industry: Real estate
- Founded: 1995
- Founder: Pan Shiyi; Zhang Xin
- Headquarters: Beijing, People's Republic of China (de facto); Cayman Islands (Incorporated Office)
- Area served: People's Republic of China
- Key people: Pan Shiyi (Chairman); Zhang Xin (CEO)
- Revenue: ▲RMB2.191 Billion (Fiscal Year Ended 31 December 2020)
- Operating income: ▼RMB1.600 Billion (Fiscal Year Ended 31 December 2020)
- Net income: ▼RMB543.466 Million (Fiscal Year Ended 31 December 2020)
- Total assets: ▲RMB70.704 Billion (Fiscal Year Ended 31 December 2020)
- Total equity: ▲RMB37.547 Billion (Fiscal Year Ended 31 December 2020)
- Website: www.sohochina.com

SOHO China is a Chinese building developer, primarily in the office and commercial sector, with some residential and mixed-use properties in its portfolio. The company, which uses the name "SOHO" in both English and Chinese contexts, was founded in 1995 by Chairman Pan Shiyi (潘石屹) and CEO Zhang Xin (张欣). The name SOHO comes from the phrase "Smart Office, Home Office" as the company decided to combine office rooms and residential apartments in the same building to facilitate a comfortable and productive environment.

SOHO China focuses on developing properties in the central business districts of Beijing and Shanghai. SOHO China developments are known for their modern architecture, with designs from figures such as Iraqi architect Zaha Hadid, and Japanese architect Kengo Kuma. The company has developed over five million square meters of commercial properties. Many of its buildings have won awards and other recognition for their design.

Fortune has described SOHO China as "one of the country's most high-profile real estate firms", and The New York Times has described the company as China's only pure prime office developer. Having shifted from a "build to sell" to "build to hold" strategy in 2012, the company now holds 1.4 million square meters of office space in Beijing and Shanghai for long-term investment. Although the company has sold several properties in the late 2010s, Pan Shiyi has said that "Soho will continue to hold and operate its core assets in Beijing and Shanghai". Pan also noted in 2016 that the transition to "build to hold" was requiring the company to endure some difficult times, but by the following year rental income had increased by 44%, contributing to a 69% increase in annual net profits for the company.

In June 2021, Pan and Zhang struck a deal to sell a controlling stake to Blackstone for $3 billion.

== History ==
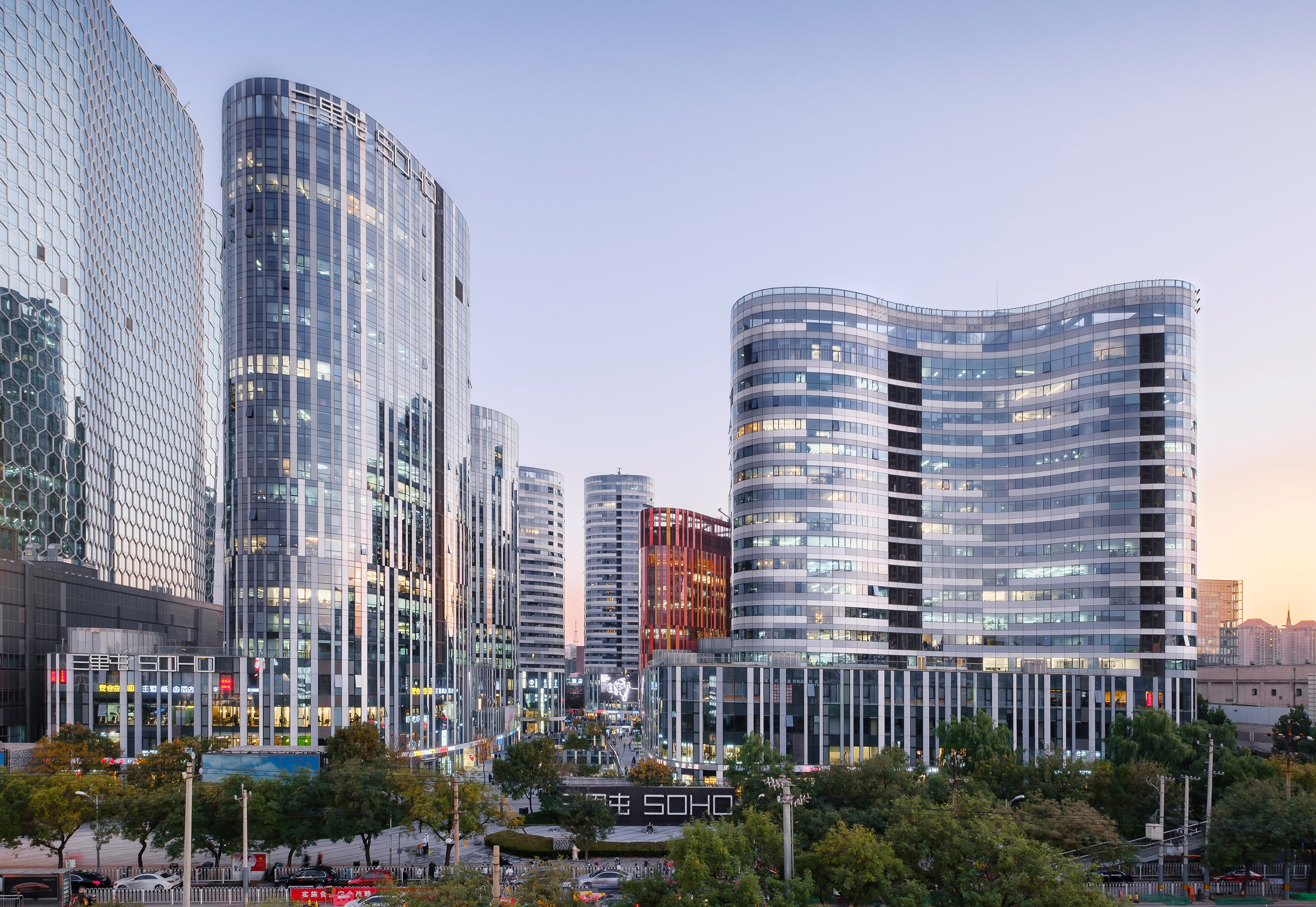
Sanlitun SOHO

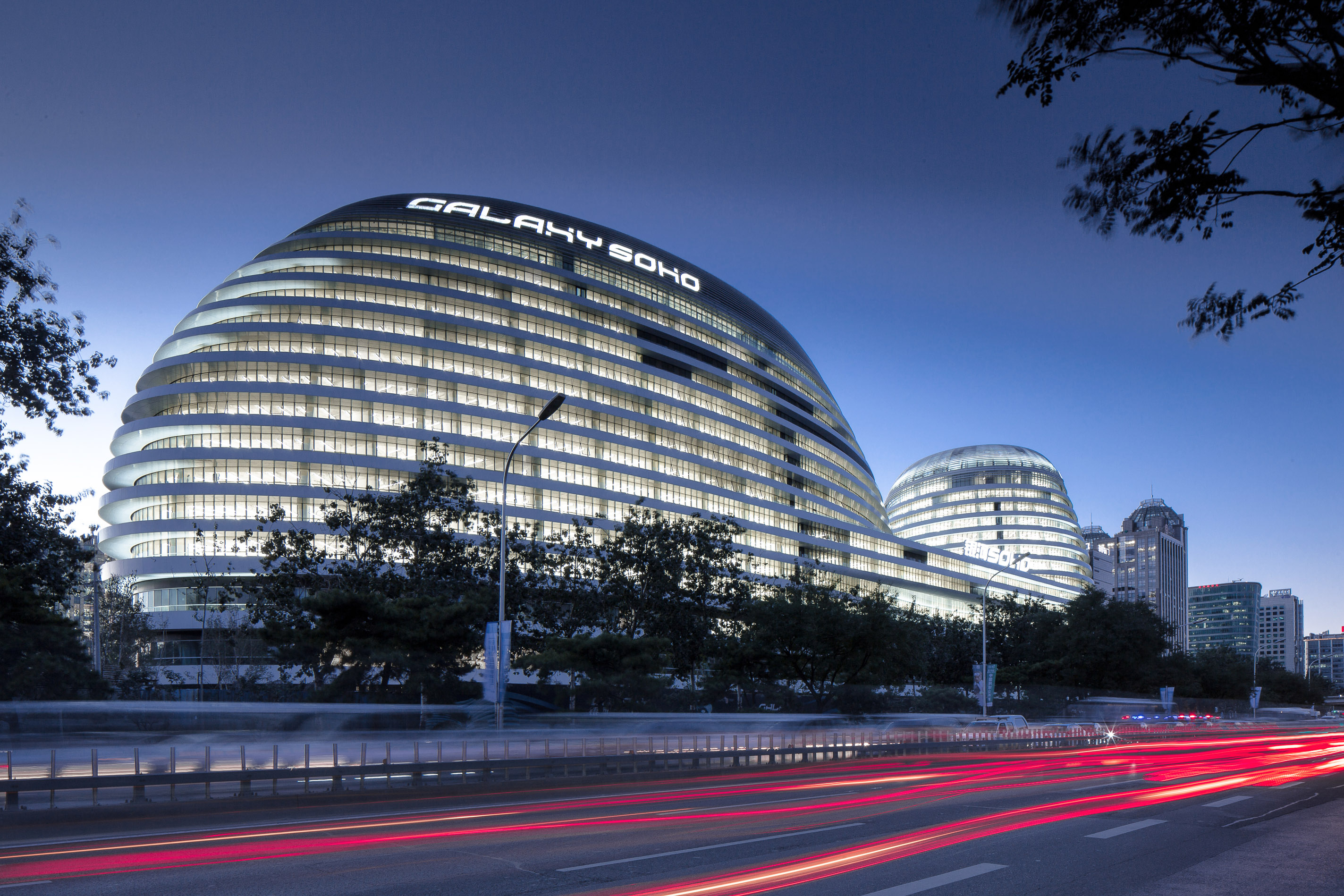
Galaxy SOHO

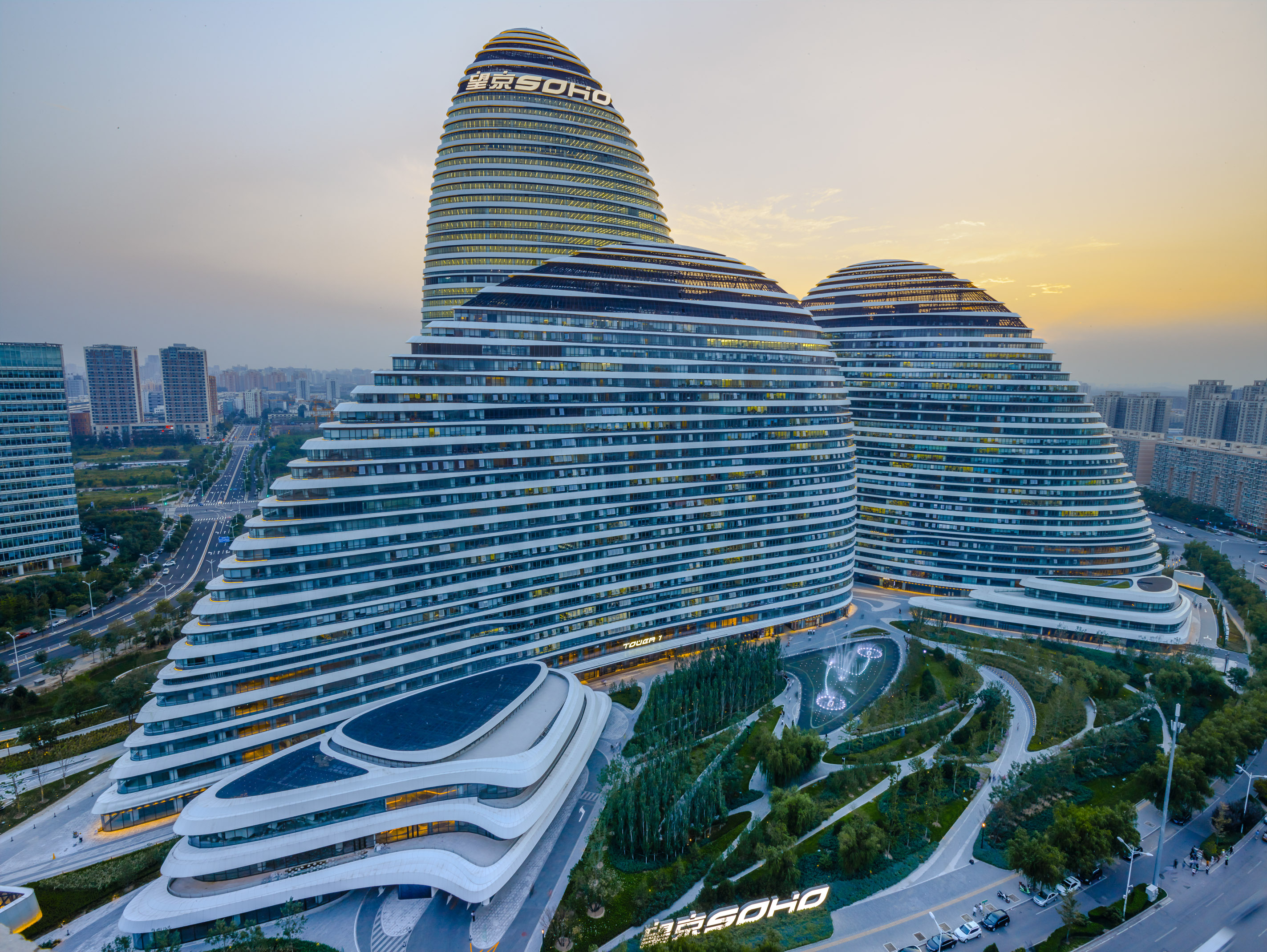
Wangjing SOHO includes the third-tallest woman-designed building in the world.

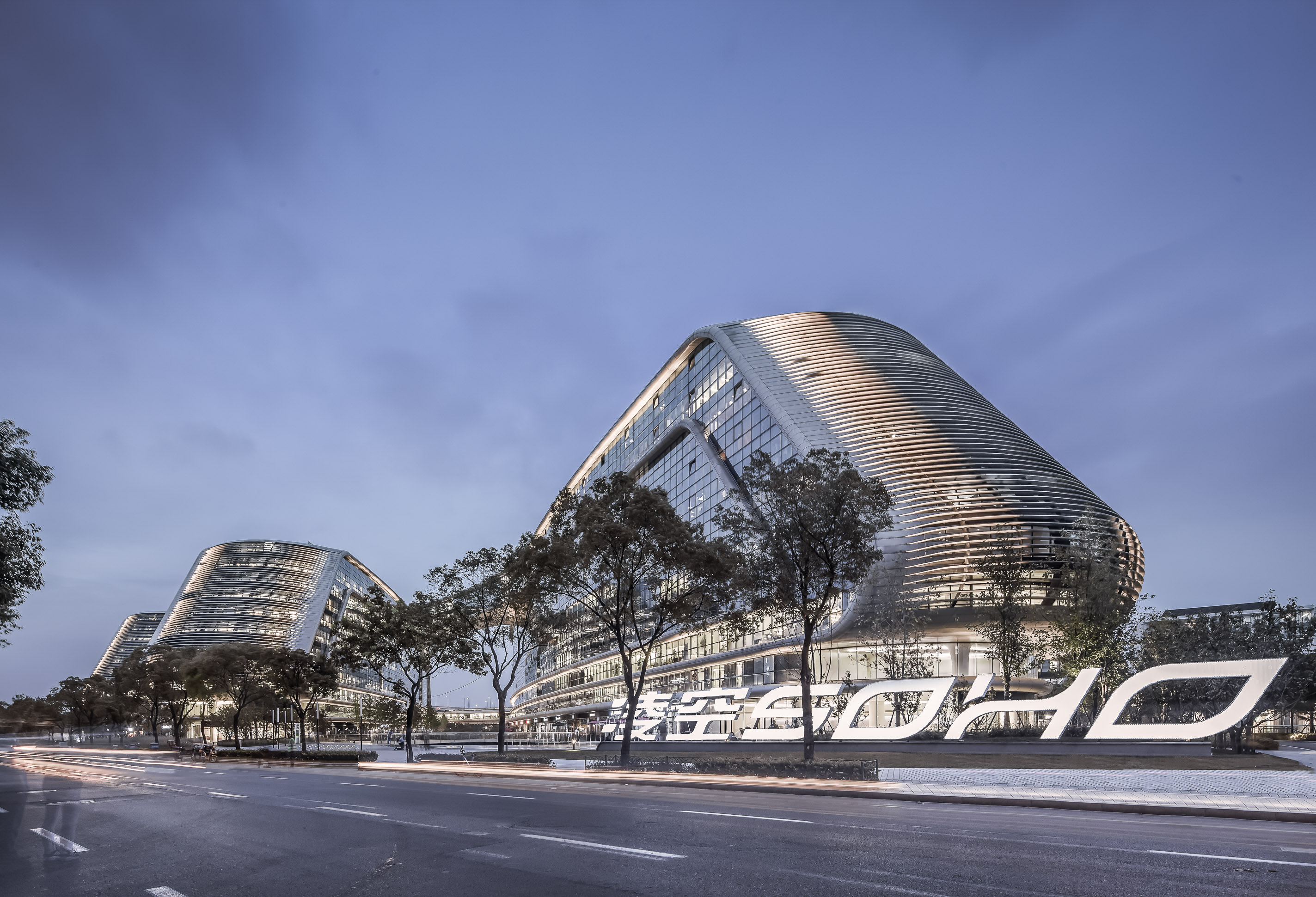
Hongqiao SOHO, also known as Sky Soho; designed by Zaha Hadid

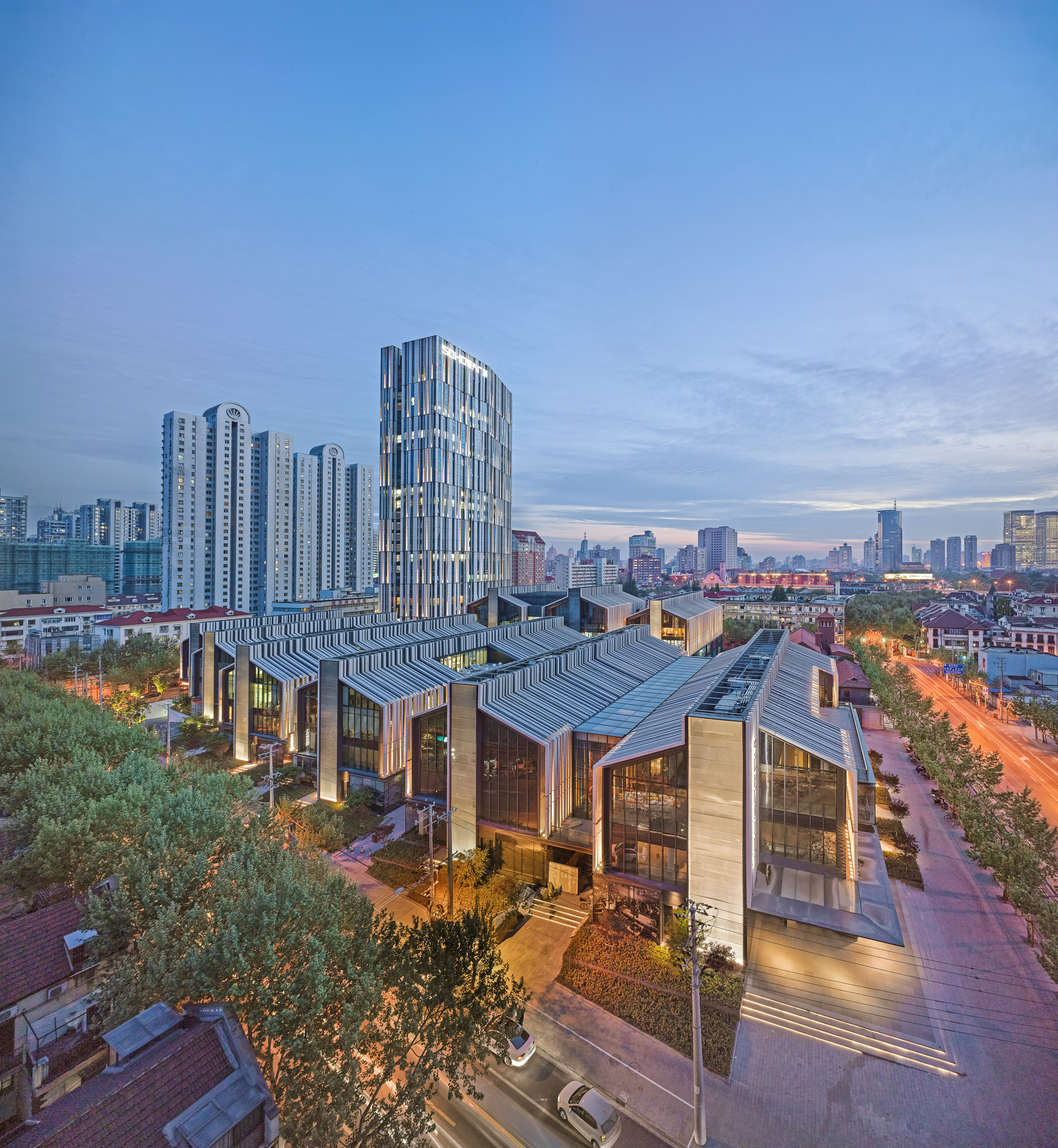
Fuxing 3Q in Shanghai

SOHO China was founded in 1995 by Zhang Xin and Pan Shiyi. Within 10 years of the company's founding, it became the largest property developer in China. SOHO China found its identity in 2000, with the advent of the Internet and the entrepreneurial excitement that followed. Small scale start-ups formed in abundance around China, and these burgeoning business needed a space to work.

On October 8, 2007, SOHO China had an IPO in which it was successfully listed on the Stock Exchange of Hong Kong (Stock Code: 410), raising proceeds of US$1.9 billion, the largest ever IPO from a private enterprise in China, after which the company was able to move more aggressively into the prime real estate of Beijing and Shanghai. As of 2019 SOHO China retains the distinction of being Asia's largest commercial real estate IPO.

By mid-2013, CNN reported that SOHO China had "18 developments in Beijing, many of them landmark buildings", with an additional 11 properties in Shanghai. As of 2019, the company had also been named one of the "Most Admired Companies" in China by Fortune (China edition) six times since 2006.

== Corporate affairs ==
The headquarters of SOHO China is in the Chaowai SOHO (朝外SOHO) in Chaoyang District, Beijing.

== Projects ==
=== Beijing ===
SOHO's earliest projects were in Beijing, and the company has had a substantial impact on the city, such that Zhang Xin has been referred to as "the woman who built Beijing". Zhang, with Iraqi architect Zaha Hadid, who designed several of the most striking SOHO buildings, have been described as "the women transforming Beijing's skyline", and as "powerful partners in shaping corporate building design in some of China's biggest cities". As of 2019, the company continues to have various additional projects under construction in that city.

==== Commune by the Great Wall ====
One of the first major SOHO projects, the Commune by the Great Wall (Chinese: 长城脚下的公社) is a private collection of modern architecture and SOHO China-managed boutique hotel, in Beijing, near the Badaling section of the Great Wall, which is one of Beijing's biggest tourist destinations. It was exhibited at La Biennale di Venezia in 2002 and was bestowed a special prize, with project mastermind Zhang Xin being recognized for her "bold personal initiative which emphasizes the role of 12 Asian architects in building privately owned houses in a definitively contemporary manner". The Centre Pompidou in Paris now houses the exhibited model, made of wood and cardboard, as its first permanent collection from China.

The Commune consists of private villas designed by 12 prominent Asian architects. This project's vision was to encourage creativity to influence a new generation of Asian architects, developers and consumers. At the Shuiguan section of the Great Wall- the Commune shares the tranquility of the mountains with a Unesco World Heritage Site. The Commune's clubhouse and 11 villas, which each have a living room, dining room, kitchen, bedrooms and bathrooms are nestled in a valley totaling eight square kilometers. Some of its luxurious villas have sauna rooms, accessible rooftops, terraces or BBQ facilities. Commune by the Great Wall is destination for corporate functions, events, weddings, film shoots and fashion shows. The Commune has furniture and other interior decorations from such distinguished designers as Serge Mouille, Thierry Hoppe, Von Robinson, Philippe Starck, Alex Strub, Claudio Colucci, Ross Menuez, Kaname Okajima, Jonas Damon, Karim Rashid, Matthew Hilton, Marc Newson, and Michael Young.

==== Jianwai SOHO and SOHO Shangdu ====
By 2004, SOHO was undertaking the construction of additional developments including Jianwai SOHO and SOHO Shangdu, both highly regarded projects. Jianwai SOHO is a residential and commercial complex of eighteen towers built as part of a larger Soho City project intended to provide housing for 50,000 people. It was designed by Japanese architect Riken Yamamoto, at the invitation of Pan Shiyi, who stated that "Beijing is not a testing ground for foreign architectural works. It is a place where their masterpieces can be brewed".

During the same period, SOHO brought in Australian company Lab Architecture Studio to design SOHO Shangdu, a shopping and residential complex in Beijing's central business district. Following Lab Architecture's avant-garde style, SOHO Shangdu was designed as "a combination of irregular and upside-down triangles". Pan noted that despite the increased cost of such designs, "they are well accepted by the market". Zhang Xin characterized the construction boom during which SOHO was building these projects as part of the release of an "incredibly repressed energy" for construction in China.

==== Sanlitun SOHO ====
Sanlitun Soho opened in the Chaoyang District of Beijing in 2010, and was designed by Japanese architect Kengo Kuma, with 465,680 square meters of space distributed between five shopping malls and nine mixed-use office and apartment buildings which "cluster around an outdoor waterscaped courtyard". Architectural Record gave the project a merit award for Best Commercial Project in 2012, writing that "by clustering its buildings along a curving, mid-block passageway, it creates the sense of a compact neighborhood with its own architectural identity".

==== Galaxy SOHO ====
Galaxy SOHO is a group of four dome-shaped fourteen-story towers in close proximity to the Forbidden City, with open interiors and a combination of shopping mall and office space, with 330,000 square meters of space. The building was designed by Zaha Hadid and opened in 2012, receiving an award the following year from the Royal Institute of British Architects. A review in The New York Times said of the complex, "[a] gargantuan structure of white curved orbs connected by sky-bridges, it towered over the squat, Soviet-style buildings nearby — like a spaceship just landed in downtown Beijing". Fortune magazine stated that "its futuristic shape changed an otherwise rectangular skyline". Aaron Betsky, writing for Architect magazine, said of the complex that "everything flows, curves, slides, and piles up in a manner that leads both your body and your eye on through the complex". He found the public and semi-public spaces to be "particularly successful, as their fluidity draws you in and around, while never overwhelming or intimidating you".

==== Wangjing SOHO ====
Wangjing SOHO (望京SOHO) is a complex of three curvilinear asymmetric skyscrapers, also designed by Zaha Hadid, opened in 2014 in Wangjing, a suburb of Beijing, between central Beijing and Beijing Capital International Airport. The towers contain both office and retail space. Originally it was designed as a two-tower complex but due to height concerns it was redesigned as a three-tower project featuring towers of lower maximum height. One of the more than a dozen properties developed by SOHO China, the complex officially opened on 20 September 2014.

The structure has curvilinear tower walls "designed to look like fluid mountains", and evoking "dancing Chinese fans", and including the third-tallest woman-designed building in the world. In 2015, it received the 2014 Emporis Skyscraper Award, the first skyscraper in China to be selected for this honor. In 2016, it was one of four buildings to receive awards determined by the China International Exchange Committee for Tall Buildings (CITAB) and the Council on Tall Buildings and Urban Habitat (CTBUH) in their inaugural China Tall Building Awards.

==== Leeza SOHO ====
Leeza SOHO (also known as Li Ze Tower) is a Skyscraper located in the Lize Financial Business District in Beijing, China. SOHO acquired land use rights for the cite in 2013 for ¥1.922 billion RMB (US$288 million). The building was designed be Zaha Hadid and Patrik Schumacher, with construction beginning in 2015 and set to be completed in 2019. The Leeza SOHO features a huge 190 metres (623 ft) tall twisting atrium at its center, which when completed will be the tallest in the world, surpassing the title currently held by the Burj Al Arab hotel in Dubai. The atrium 'twists' 45° over the length of the building to allow natural light to all floors. Structural rings at each level, four sky bridges, and a double-insulated glass facade unite the two halves of the tower together. It is located at the intersection of Lines 14 and 16 currently under-construction for the Beijing Subway rail network.

=== Shanghai ===
Shanghai is SOHO China's other main area of development, beginning with the completion of The Exchange-SOHO in Shanghai's affluent Nanjing West Road area in 2008, and the acquisition of land for development in the Bund region in 2010. In August 2018, SOHO China announced the sale of three of its Shanghai properties, Hongkou SOHO, north of the city's Bund area, SOHO Tianshan Plaza, and Lingkong SOHO, in the Changning district.

Prominent Shanghai projects include:

- SOHO Century Plaza, a 24-story high-rise building in the Pudong commercial district of Shanghai. It was sold by SOHO in July 2016 for 3.22 billion yuan, or 76,700 yuan per square metre, a price described as "a 21 per cent premium on its book value".
- SOHO Fuxing Plaza, a mixed-use development with retail and offices, opened in 2014 in Shanghai, developed by SOHO and designed by firms gmp Architects (Germany) and Aim Architecture (China).
- Bund SOHO, a development of classical European-style buildings in Shanghai designed by Chinese firm Aim Architecture. In 2016, it was one of four buildings to receive awards determined by the China International Exchange Committee for Tall Buildings (CITAB) and the Council on Tall Buildings and Urban Habitat (CTBUH) in their inaugural China Tall Building Awards. As of 2017, it was reported to have an occupancy rate of 96%.
- Hongkou SOHO, which has 95,000 square meters of space, and "is enveloped in a pattern of pleated aluminum mesh measuring 18mm in width and as a whole, visualizes like a woven lace". As of 2017, it was reported to have an occupancy rate of 96%.
- Hongqiao SOHO, also known as Sky Soho, designed by Zaha Hadid and completed in 2014. Due to its proximity to a nearby transportation hub, the building is designed to evoke high-speed rail cars.
- Gubei SOHO, the seventh Shanghai property to be built by SOHO China. It is a 38-storey tower at the intersection of Hongqiao Road and Yan'an Road designed by architect James von Klemperer of Kohn Pedersen Fox Associates, drawing inspiration from the Endless Column by Romanian sculptor Constantin Brâncuși. The project begin with the acquisition of the site by SOHO in 2013 for RMB 3.19 billion, and was completed in March 2019, with construction costs of RMB 1.7 billion. The building is LEED gold-certified, and includes over 52,738 square meters of office space, and over 60,000 square meters of retail space. It is located near Tianshan Plaza, and will be linked with the Shanghai metro via Yili Road Station.

=== SOHO 3Q ===
In 2015, the company launched its shared-office product, SOHO 3Q, which provides business community and office space to entrepreneurs in Beijing, Shanghai, Hangzhou, Nanjing, Shenzhen, Guangzhou, and Chongqing. Headquartered at Chaowai SOHO in Beijing, by July 2016, the coworking space had 12 spaces in China, five in Beijing and seven in Shanghai. SOHO China first contemplated the idea of a co-working space in August 2014 in line with other companies taking part in the sharing economy, such as Airbnb and Uber. After detailed research on 30 internet companies, real estate tycoon and company chairman, Pan Shiyi announced the 3Q project in January 2015. Considered to be "Act 3" for the company, the initiative is meant to also cater to a large number of small- and medium-sized companies that no longer rent long-term office space and instead prefer to rent for a week, a month or half a year. The first two spaces–Wangjing 3Q in Beijing and Fuxing 3Q in Shanghai–opened on February 1, 2016. At that time, 3Q become the largest coworking space in China with about 1500 seats and spurred the subsequent growth of a range of local coworking spaces and options. In April 2016, Guanghualu II 3Q opened in CBD Beijing with more than 3000 seats and Guanghualu II is the largest space of 3Q as the brand's flagship store.

== Table of tall buildings ==
SOHO China buildings reported in the Skyscraper Center database of the Council on Tall Buildings and Urban Habitat:

Building	Year	Max height (m/ft)	Floors	City	Function
The Exchange–SOHO	2005	217 metres (711.9 ft)	52	Shanghai	Office
Guanghualu SOHO	2008	60 metres (196.9 ft)	16	Beijing	Office/retail
SOHO Century Plaza	2012	-	24	Shanghai	Office
Galaxy SOHO	2012	67 metres (219.8 ft)	15	Beijing	Office/retail
Wangjing SOHO T1	2014	118 metres (387.1 ft)	25	Beijing	Office
Wangjing SOHO T2	2014	127 metres (416.7 ft)	26	Beijing	Office
Wangjing SOHO T3	2014	200 metres (656.2 ft)	45	Beijing	Office
Bund SOHO	2015	135.6 metres (444.9 ft)	31	Shanghai	Office
Hongkou SOHO	2015	133.5 metres (438.0 ft)	29	Shanghai	Office
SOHO Fuxing Plaza	2015	105 metres (344.5 ft)	27	Shanghai	Office
SOHO Leeza Tower	2019	207 metres (679.1 ft)	46	Beijing	Office
Gubei SOHO Tower	2019	-	38	Shanghai	Office

== Philanthropy ==
Founded in 2005, the SOHO China Foundation oversees all of the philanthropic activity on behalf of SOHO China. The Foundation's mission is to fund education initiatives that support Chinese students from underserved communities. The Foundation's primary project is the SOHO China Scholarships, a US$100 million initiative to endow financial aid scholarships for Chinese students at top international universities, including Harvard University (July 2014) and Yale University (October 2014). The SOHO China Foundation, through its "Teach for China" program, has previously funded education programs in poor rural areas in China.

== See also ==
- Real estate in China
