= Matthew Hilton (designer) =

British furniture designer

Matthew Hilton RDI
- Born: 31 January 1957; Hastings, England
- Education: Portsmouth College of Art
- Alma mater: Kingston Polytechnic
- Occupations: Furniture designer and Industrial designer
- Known for: Balzac armchair
- Website: Matthew Hilton

Matthew Hilton RDI (born 1957) is a British industrial designer of modern furniture, lighting, and sculptural works.

== Life and career ==
Hilton attended Portsmouth College of Art and then Kingston Polytechnic graduating in 1979. After graduation he was an industrial designer and model maker until 1984. In 1991, he designed the "Balzac Armchair" for SCP Limited, a company started by Sheridan Coakley in 1985 and now based in Shoreditch, London. Between 2000 and 2004 Hilton was Habitat's head of furniture design. He was elected a Royal Designer for Industry (RDI) in 2005.

In 2013, Hilton designed a watch which was self-produced in small numbers.

== Awards and accomplishments ==
In 2004 Hilton was made a Royal Designer for Industry. RDI is the highest accolade for designers in the UK; only 200 designers can hold the title and non-UK designers may receive the honorary title Hon RDI. Hilton's furniture design work has been called the application of skilled craftsmanship, real materials, and serious integrity. Haute Living magazine described it as incredibly elegant, simple lines and master craftsmanship.

In 2012, Hilton received an honorary doctorate from Kingston University for his contributions to British design.

== Examples of Matthew Hilton's works ==
- Balzac Armchair Produced by SCP
- Light Table, Produced by De La Espada
- Eos Garden Furniture Produced by Case Furniture
- Dulwich Extending Dining Table Produced by Case Furniture
- Cross Extending Dining Table Produced by Case Furniture
