= Pan Shiyi =

Chinese business magnate (born 1963)

- 潘石屹
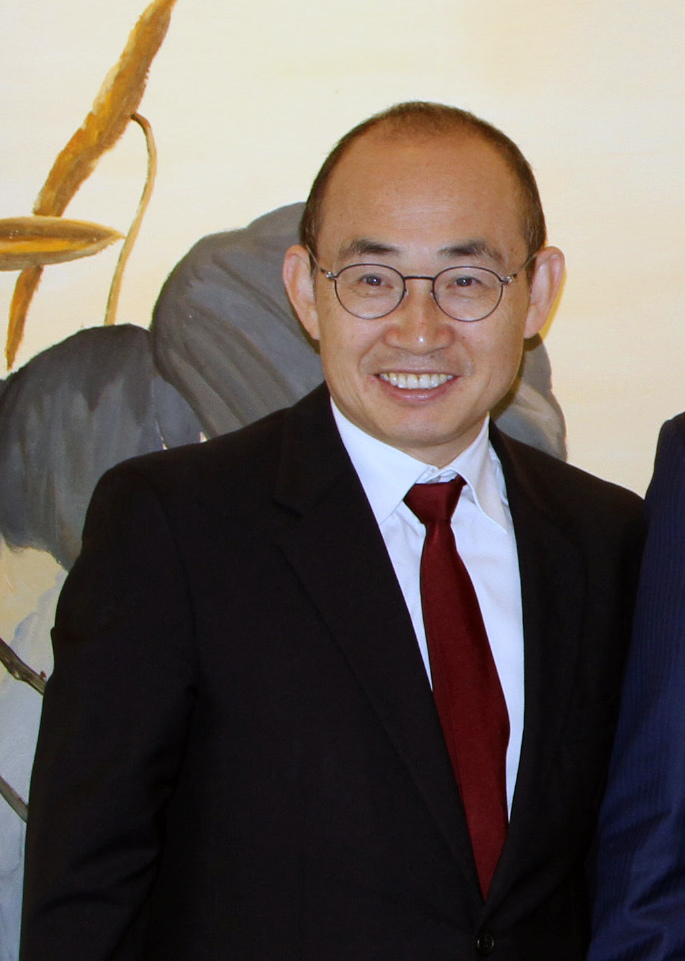
- Pan in 2017
- Born: 14 November 1963 (age 62); Tianshui, Gansu Province, China
- Education: Hebei Technical College of Petroleum Profession
- Occupations: Co-Founder, SOHO China
- Spouse: Zhang Xin
- Children: 3
- Website: blog.sina.com.cn/panshiyi

Pan Shiyi (Chinese: 潘石屹; pinyin: Pān Shíyì; born 14 November 1963) is a Chinese businessman. He co-founded Soho China with his wife, Zhang Xin, in 1995 and built it into one of China's leading real estate developers during the country's property boom. In 2022, the couple stepped down from the company's management and have since been primarily active in the United States.

== Personal life ==
Pan married three times. His first and second wives are not publicly known. He married his third wife, Zhang Xin, in 1994 and co-founded Soho China a year later. They converted to Baháʼí Faith in 2005.

Pan starred as a lonely real estate developer "Li Wenqing" in the 2006 romantic film Aspirin (阿司匹林), alongside Mei Ting.

== See also ==
- Ren Zhiqiang
