= Zhang Xin =

Chinese billionaire & businesswoman

- Born: 24 August 1965 (age 61); Beijing, China
- Education: University of Sussex; University of Cambridge
- Occupations: Co-Founder, SOHO China Founder, Closer Media CEO, Closer Properties
- Spouse: Pan Shiyi
- Children: 2
- Website: www.sohochina.com www.closermedia.com www.closerproperties.com

Zhang Xin (simplified Chinese: 张欣; traditional Chinese: 張欣; pinyin: Zhāng Xīn, also known as Xin "Shynn" Zhang, born 1965) is an American businesswoman best known for co-founding the real estate developer SOHO China with her husband Pan Shiyi.

Born in Beijing, Zhang moved with her family to Hong Kong at the age of 14. She pursued higher education in the United Kingdom and began her career in finance in Hong Kong and New York. From 1995 to 2022, she and her husband built SOHO China into a major office developer during China’s property boom, before stepping down from the company ahead of the sector’s downturn. Since the 2010s, they have shifted their assets and business activities to the United States.

== Early life and education ==
In the 1950s, Zhang Xin's parents, second-generation Burmese Chinese, left Burma and immigrated to China. There, they worked as translators at the Foreign Languages Press. They separated during the Cultural Revolution.

Born in Beijing in 1965, Zhang remained with her mother after the separation of her parents, moving with her mother to Hong Kong at the age of 15, where they lived in a room just big enough for two bunk beds. To save for an education abroad, she worked for five years in small factories that made garment and electronic products. By the age of 19, she had saved enough for airfare to London and to support herself for English study at a secretarial school in Oxford. To support herself in the UK, she "worked in a traditional British fish and chip shop run by a Chinese couple," and took on Prime Minister Margaret Thatcher as a role model, while also developing a "fascination with left-wing British intellectuals."

In 1987, while still studying in London, she earned a scholarship that enabled her to begin studying economics at the University of Sussex, where she received a bachelor's degree. In 1992, she graduated with a master's degree in development economics from Cambridge University, where she wrote her master's thesis on privatization in China. In 2013, Zhang received an honorary doctorate from the University of Sussex.

== Career ==
=== Early career ===
Upon graduation, Zhang was hired by Barings PLC (later Barings Bank), which had scouted Cambridge for students with knowledge of privatization in China, and which hired Zhang on the strength of her master's thesis on the topic. She returned to Hong Kong to work, but in 1993, her unit at Barings was acquired by Goldman Sachs, and Zhang was transferred to New York City, where she helped bring privatized Chinese factories to the public stock exchange. Intrigued by China's burgeoning urbanization, she returned to her hometown, Beijing, where she met and married her future husband Pan Shiyi in 1994. Pan purportedly proposed just four days after they met. In 1994, the couple began a mixed-use development project on unwanted land, called "New Town."

=== Business ===
She co-founded Hongshi (meaning Red Stone), which later became SOHO China, with her husband Pan Shiyi in 1995. Over the next decade, they began six additional development projects in China, including a residential development in Boao, on the island of Hainan, and the Commune by the Great Wall, a managed boutique hotel in Beijing featuring the works of twelve Asian architects recruited by Zhang. Early in their marriage and business relationship, the couple experienced friction due to differing ideas of how the business should be run, leading Zhang to return to England for a time to reflect. Eventually, she decided to return to her husband, but left the business for a time, returning to focus on the design end when business increased.

Within 10 years, Soho became China's leading commercial property developer, with Zhang known as "the woman who built Beijing". By 2008, the couple was described by The Times as "China's most visible and flamboyant property tycoons." In 2011, Zhang began to transition from developing and selling properties to buying and leasing space.

In 2014, Zhang and her husband launched a $100 million charitable initiative, the SOHO China Scholarships, "to fund disadvantaged Chinese students at top institutions across the globe," including gifts of over $10 million to Yale University, over $15 million to Harvard University, and $10 million to the University of Chicago; the gifts engendered some controversy among critics who felt that the money could have been spent improving schools in China. The SOHO China Scholarships support approximately 50 Chinese students pursuing undergraduate degrees at partner universities. SOHO China began a transition from a business model of building and selling properties to one of buying and leasing them, with Zhang participating in the February 2015 launch of the SOHO 3Q shared office space sector, leasing shared space to companies in cities in China.

Zhang established the New York City-based Closer Properties in 2008. She began unwinding her operations in China in the mid-2010s, citing high capital costs and low rental yields that had reduced investment returns in the country's real estate sector to "very low" levels. Between 2014 and 2021, SOHO China sold more than RMB30 billion (US$4.2 billion) in assets, ranging from office buildings to parking facilities, before Beijing blocked Zhang's proposed sale of the entire company to Blackstone. During the same period, Zhang invested in nearly a dozen trophy properties in New York and Boston, including acquiring a $600 million stake in New York City's Park Avenue Plaza, followed by participation in a group acquiring a 40 percent stake in the General Motors Building in midtown Manhattan in 2014 for a reported $1.4 billion, with total investments exceeding US$5 billion.

In 2015, Zhang and her husband set up the New York–based family office Seven Valleys (now Closer Group). Zhang relocated to the United States during the COVID-19 pandemic and resigned from SOHO China in September 2022. In 2021, Xin founded Closer Media, a film production and financing company focusing on the US film industry.

=== Recognition ===
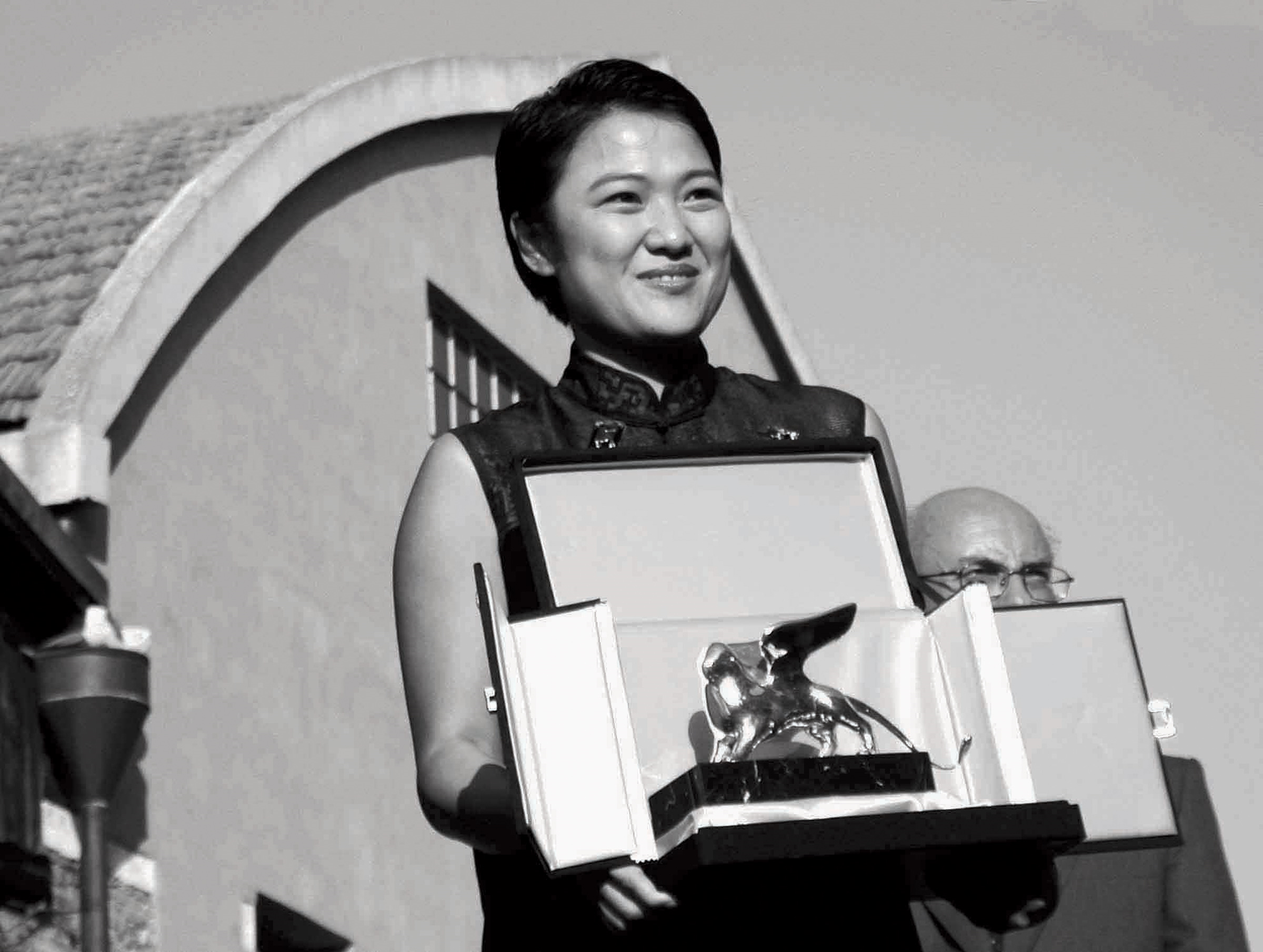
Zhang Xin receiving a 'Special Prize for an individual patron of architectural works' at the 8th International Architecture Exhibition of la Biennale di Venezia in September 2002.

Zhang has received international awards for her role as an architectural patron in China and as an entrepreneur. In 2002, she was awarded a special prize at the 8th la Biennale di Venezia for Commune by the Great Wall, a private collection of architecture, now a hotel.

Zhang is a member of World Economic Forum, Davos and a board member of the Harvard Global Advisory Council. She served as a trustee to the China Institute in America from 2005 to 2010, and was recognized by the China Institute with a Blue Cloud Award in 2010. In 2014, Zhang was listed as the 62nd most powerful woman in the world by Forbes. and is "regularly named one of the top businesswomen in the world." Zhang and her husband have also been ranked by Forbes among the "world's most powerful couples." Zhang has been named a trustee of the Museum of Modern Art, she is trustee of the Aspen Institute and a member of the Asia Business Council. In 2026 she was invited to become a member of the Executives Branch of the Academy of Motion Picture Arts and Sciences.

Zhang made a cameo appearance, as a representative of a Chinese investor, in the 2010 film Wall Street: Money Never Sleeps.

== Personal life ==
Zhang and Pan have two sons. They are members of the Baháʼí Faith.
