= Higher Ground Productions =

Media production company founded by Barack and Michelle Obama

Higher Ground
- Type: Private
- Industry: Entertainment
- Founded: 2018; 8 years ago
- Founder: Barack Obama; Michelle Obama
- Headquarters: United States
- Services: Film and TV production; Podcasting

Higher Ground Productions, also known simply as Higher Ground, is an American production company which was founded in 2018 by former United States president Barack Obama and former first lady Michelle Obama.

== History ==
In May 2018, the Obamas launched Higher Ground Productions by signing a multi-year deal with Netflix to produce scripted and unscripted film and television projects, with the goal of the company to lift up diverse voices in the entertainment industry. Michelle Obama stated "I have always believed in the power of storytelling to inspire us, to make us think differently about the world around us, and to help us open our minds and hearts to others." In February 2019, Priya Swaminathan, Tonia Davis, and Qadriyyah “Q” Shamsid-Deen joined the company, with Swaminathan and Davis serving as co-heads and Shamsid-Deen serving as a creative executive.

On June 6, 2019, Spotify announced a partnership with Higher Ground to produce Spotify-exclusive podcasts. The first podcast of the partnership, The Michelle Obama Podcast, premiered on July 29, 2020.

The company's first film was American Factory, released in 2019. Netflix released Becoming a documentary following Michelle Obama on her book tour promoting her memoir of the same name.

Higher Ground has multiple projects in development, including a feature film adaptation of Frederick Douglass's biography, a drama series set in the fashion scene of post-WWII New York City, and a scripted anthology series of the New York Times obituary column highlighting deaths of remarkable people not reported.

In June 2022, it was announced that Higher Ground would be ending its partnership with Spotify, as it signed a multi-year, multi-million-dollar deal with Audible.

In March 2025, the company announced that Michelle Obama and her brother Craig Robinson would launch a podcast called “IMO”.

Following over 20 projects for Netflix, the company announced, in April 2026, that it would transition into an independent production company, to work with multiple studios, including Netflix.

== Awards ==
In 2020, the company won an Academy Award for Best Documentary Feature Film and a Primetime Emmy Award for Outstanding Directing for a Documentary/Nonfiction Program for American Factory.

== Productions ==
=== Feature films ===
Release date	Title	Distributor	Co-production with	Notes	Ref.
June 7, 2021	Fatherhood	Netflix	Columbia Pictures, Bron Creative, Temple Hill Entertainment, Free Association and Hartbeat Productions		
September 3, 2021	Worth	Netflix	Madriver Pictures, Riverstone Pictures, Ingenious Media, Anonymous Content, Sugar 23, Royal Viking Entertainment and Stepplechase Amusements		
November 3, 2023	Rustin	Netflix	Bold Choices	AARP Movies for Grownups Award for Best Actor; NAACP Image Award for Outstanding Actor in a Motion Picture; Nominated—Academy Award for Best Actor; Nominated—AARP Movies for Grownups Award for Best Ensemble; Nominated—AARP Movies for Grownups Award for Best Time Capsule; Nominated—BAFTA Award for Best Actor in a Leading Role; Nominated—Black Reel Award for Outstanding Film; Nominated—Black Reel Award for Outstanding Lead Performance; Nominated—Black Reel Award for Outstanding Screenplay; Nominated—Black Reel Award for Outstanding Ensemble; Nominated—Black Reel Award for Outstanding Costume Design; Nominated—Black Reel Award for Outstanding Hairstyling & Makeup; Nominated—Black Reel Award for Outstanding Original Score; Nominated—Black Reel Award for Outstanding Original Song; Nominated—Black Reel Award for Outstanding Original Soundtrack; Nominated—Black Reel Award for Outstanding Production Design; Nominated—Critics' Choice Movie Award for Best Actor; Nominated—Critics' Choice Movie Award for Best Song; Nominated—Dallas–Fort Worth Film Critics Association Award for Best Actor; Nominated—Golden Globe Award for Best Actor in a Motion Picture – Drama; Nominated—Golden Globe Award for Best Original Song; Nominated—Hollywood Music in Media Award for Best Original Score in a Feature Film; Nominated—Hollywood Music in Media Award for Best Original Song in a Feature Film; Nominated—NAACP Image Award for Outstanding Motion Picture; Nominated—NAACP Image Award for Outstanding Directing in a Motion Picture; Nominated—NAACP Image Award for Outstanding Supporting Actor in a Motion Picture; Nominated—San Diego Film Critics Society Award for Best Actor; Nominated—Satellite Award for Best Actor in a Motion Picture – Drama; Nominated—Satellite Award for Best Original Song; Nominated—Screen Actors Guild Award for Outstanding Performance by a Male Actor in a Leading Role; Nominated—Washington D.C. Area Film Critics Association Award for Best Actor; Nominated—World Soundtrack Award for Best Original Song	
December 8, 2023	Leave the World Behind	Netflix	Red OM Films and Esmail Corp	Nominated—AARP Movies for Grownups Award for Best Actress; Nominated—AARP Movies for Grownups Award for Best Intergenerational Film; Nominated—Set Decorators Society of America Award for Best Achievement in Decor/Design of a Contemporary Feature Film	

=== Television ===
Release date	Title	Notes	Ref.
March 16, 2021	Waffles + Mochi	An educational Netflix original series for kids; centered on healthy eating. Nominated—Children's and Family Emmy Award for Outstanding Preschool Series (2022–2023); Nominated—Children's and Family Emmy Award for Outstanding Writing for a Live Action Preschool or Children's Program (2022); Nominated—Children's and Family Emmy Award for Outstanding Cinematography for a Live Action Single-Camera Program (2022–2023); Nominated—Children's and Family Emmy Award for Outstanding Editing for a Single Camera Program (2023); Nominated—Children's and Family Emmy Award for Outstanding Lighting, Camera and Technical Arts (2023); Nominated—Children's and Family Emmy Award for Outstanding Sound Mixing and Sound Editing for a Live Action Program (2023); Nominated—Children's and Family Emmy Award for Outstanding Visual Effects for a Live Action Program (2022); Nominated—NAACP Image Award for Outstanding Children's Program (2021–2022); Nominated—Producers Guild of America Award for Outstanding Children's Program (2021); Nominated—TCA Award for Outstanding Achievement in Youth Programming (2021); Nominated—Writers Guild of America Award for Children's Script – Episodic, Long form and Specials (2021)	
July 4, 2021	We the People	Children's and Family Emmy Award for Outstanding Short Form Program; Hollywood Music in Media Award for Best Original Song in a TV Show/Limited Series; Nominated—Annie Award for Best Animated Television Production for Children; Nominated—Annie Award for Outstanding Achievement for Character Animation in an Animated Television/Broadcast Production; Nominated—Guild of Music Supervisors Award for Best Song Written and/or Recorded for Television	
September 28, 2021	Ada Twist, Scientist	An educational Netflix original series for kids; centered on science, technology, engineering and math. Annie Award for Best Animated Television Production for Preschool (2021); Children's and Family Emmy Award for Outstanding Preschool Animated Series (2022); GLAAD Media Award for Outstanding Children's Programming (2023); Nominated—Children's and Family Emmy Award for Outstanding Preschool Animated Series (2023); Nominated—Children's and Family Emmy Award for Outstanding Directing for a Preschool Animated Program (2022–2023); Nominated—Children's and Family Emmy Award for Outstanding Writing for a Preschool Animated Program (2022); Nominated—Children's and Family Emmy Award for Outstanding Editing for a Preschool Animated Program (2023); Nominated—Children's and Family Emmy Award for Outstanding Voice Directing for an Animated Series (2023); Nominated—NAACP Image Award for Outstanding Children's Program (2021, 2023); Nominated—TCA Award for Outstanding Achievement in Youth Programming (2022)	
April 13, 2022	Our Great National Parks	Primetime Emmy Award for Outstanding Narrator – Barack Obama (for "A World of Wonder"); Nominated—Critics' Choice Documentary Award for Best Narration – Barack Obama; Nominated—Primetime Emmy Award for Outstanding Cinematography for a Nonfiction Program (for "Chilean Patagonia")	
May 19, 2022	The G Word with Adam Conover	A spiritual successor to Adam Ruins Everything with a focus on the US Federal Government starring Adam Conover.	
April 25, 2023	The Light We Carry: Michelle Obama and Oprah Winfrey	Nominated—Primetime Emmy Award for Outstanding Hosted Nonfiction Series or Special	
May 17, 2023	Working: What We Do All Day	How people find meaning and connection through work, sharing experiences and struggles; former President Barack Obama visits people in their homes and workplaces, following them at all levels, from service jobs to the executive suite. Primetime Emmy Award for Outstanding Narrator – Barack Obama (for "The Middle")	
May 9, 2024	Bodkin		
October 9, 2024	Starting 5		
November 20, 2024	Our Oceans	The planet's life-blood, oceans, hide countless mysteries - from balmy Indian waters and fiery Atlantic depths to the Ring of Fire-encircled Pacific and frigid Southern and Arctic seas. Primetime Emmy Award for Outstanding Narrator – Barack Obama (for "Indian Ocean")	
February 18, 2025	Court of Gold		
June 26, 2026	Life, Larry and the Pursuit of Unhappiness		
TBA	White Mountains	Reportedly based on the story of Barney and Betty Hill who claimed they were abducted by extraterrestrials.	
TBA	All the Sinners Bleed	Based on the novel by S. A. Cosby	
TBA	Journey		

=== Documentaries ===
Release date	Title	Notes	Ref.
August 21, 2019	American Factory	Academy Award for Best Documentary Feature Film; Critics' Choice Documentary Award for Best Political Documentary; Critics' Choice Documentary Award for Best Director; Directors Guild of America Award for Outstanding Directorial Achievement in Documentary; Gotham Independent Film Award for Best Documentary; Independent Spirit Award for Best Documentary Feature; Los Angeles Film Critics Association Award for Best Documentary Film; Primetime Emmy Award for Outstanding Directing for a Documentary/Nonfiction Program; Toronto Film Critics Association Award for Best Documentary Film; Nominated—BAFTA Award for Best Documentary; Nominated—Chicago Film Critics Association Award for Best Documentary; Nominated—Critics' Choice Documentary Award for Best Documentary Feature; Nominated—Dallas–Fort Worth Film Critics Association Award for Best Documentary Film; Nominated—Florida Film Critics Circle Award for Best Documentary Film; Nominated—Gotham Independent Film Audience Award; Nominated—Online Film Critics Society Award for Best Documentary Film; Nominated—National Society of Film Critics Award for Best Non-Fiction Film; Nominated—Primetime Emmy Award for Outstanding Cinematography for a Nonfiction Program; Nominated—Primetime Emmy Award for Outstanding Picture Editing for a Nonfiction Program; Nominated—Producers Guild of America Award for Best Documentary Motion Picture; Nominated—San Francisco Bay Area Film Critics Circle Award for Best Documentary Film; Nominated—Sundance Film Festival Grand Jury Prize: U.S. Documentary; Nominated—Washington D.C. Area Film Critics Association Award for Best Documentary	
March 25, 2020	Crip Camp	Independent Spirit Award for Best Documentary Feature; Sundance Film Festival Audience Award: U.S. Documentary; Nominated—Academy Award for Best Documentary Feature Film; Nominated—AARP Movies for Grownups Award for Best Documentary; Nominated—Critics' Choice Documentary Award for Best Documentary Feature; Nominated—Critics' Choice Documentary Award for Best Director; Nominated—Dallas–Fort Worth Film Critics Association Award for Best Documentary Film; Nominated—Golden Reel Award for Outstanding Achievement in Sound Editing – Feature Documentary; Nominated—Satellite Award for Best Documentary Film; Nominated—Sundance Film Festival Grand Jury Prize: U.S. Documentary; Nominated—Toronto Film Critics Association Award for Best Documentary Film; Nominated—Washington D.C. Area Film Critics Association Award for Best Documentary	
May 6, 2020	Becoming	Nominated—Black Reel Award for Outstanding Television Documentary or Special; Nominated—Grammy Award for Best Score Soundtrack for Visual Media; Nominated—Primetime Emmy Award for Outstanding Documentary or Nonfiction Special; Nominated—Primetime Emmy Award for Outstanding Directing for a Documentary/Nonfiction Program; Nominated—Primetime Emmy Award for Outstanding Cinematography for a Nonfiction Program; Nominated—Outstanding Music Composition for a Documentary Series or Special (Original Dramatic Score)	
October 21, 2022	Descendant	Nominated—Black Reel Award for Outstanding Documentary; Nominated—Chicago Film Critics Association Award for Best Documentary; Nominated—Critics' Choice Documentary Award for Best Documentary Feature; Nominated—Critics' Choice Documentary Award for Best Director; Nominated—Florida Film Critics Circle Award for Best Documentary Film; Nominated—NAACP Image Award for Outstanding Documentary; Nominated—National Society of Film Critics Award for Best Non-Fiction Film; Nominated—Producers Guild of America Award for Best Documentary Motion Picture; Nominated—Satellite Award for Best Documentary Film; Nominated—Sundance Film Festival Grand Jury Prize: U.S. Documentary; Nominated—Washington D.C. Area Film Critics Association Award for Best Documentary	
November 29, 2023	American Symphony	Dallas–Fort Worth Film Critics Association Award for Best Documentary Film; Grammy Award for Best Music Film; Grammy Award for Best Song Written for Visual Media; Producers Guild of America Award for Best Documentary Motion Picture; Washington D.C. Area Film Critics Association Award for Best Documentary; Nominated—Academy Award for Best Original Song; Nominated—American Cinema Editors Award for Best Edited Documentary – Feature; Nominated—BAFTA Award for Best Documentary; Nominated—Black Reel Award for Outstanding Documentary; Nominated—Black Reel Award for Outstanding Original Score; Nominated—Black Reel Award for Outstanding Original Song; Nominated—Cinema Audio Society Award for Outstanding Achievement in Sound Mixing for a Motion Picture – Documentary; Nominated—Critics' Choice Documentary Award for Best Documentary Feature; Nominated—Critics' Choice Documentary Award for Best Director; Nominated—Golden Reel Award for Outstanding Achievement in Music Editing – Documentary; Nominated—Golden Reel Award for Outstanding Achievement in Sound Editing – Feature Documentary; Nominated—Guild of Music Supervisors Award for Best Song Written and/or Recording Created for a Film; Nominated—NAACP Image Award for Outstanding Documentary (Film); Nominated—San Francisco Bay Area Film Critics Circle Award for Best Documentary Film; Nominated—Satellite Award for Best Documentary Film; Nominated—Satellite Award for Best Original Song; Nominated—Satellite Award for Best Sound (Editing and Mixing); Nominated—Vancouver Film Critics Circle Award for Best Documentary; Nominated—World Soundtrack Award for Best Original Song	

=== Theatre ===
Opening date	Title	Venue	Notes	Ref.
April 16, 2026	Proof	Booth Theatre	Nominated—Drama League Award for Outstanding Revival of a Play; Nominated—Drama League Award for Distinguished Performance	

=== Podcasts ===
Release date	Title	Notes	Ref.
July 29, 2020 (premiere)	The Michelle Obama Podcast	Produced in exclusive partnership with Spotify.	
February 22, 2021 (premiere)	Renegades: Born in the USA	Produced in exclusive partnership with Spotify.	
January 12, 2022 (season premiere)	The Big Hit Show: Twilight	Produced in exclusive partnership with Spotify.	
February 9, 2022 (season premiere)	The Big Hit Show: To Pimp a Butterfly	Produced in exclusive partnership with Spotify.	
March 21, 2023 (season premiere)	The Light Podcast		
August 30, 2023 (season premiere)	Your Mama's Kitchen		
December 12, 2024	The Wonder of Stevie	Produced in partnership with Pineapple Street Productions.	
March 12, 2025 (season premiere)	IMO with Michelle Obama and Craig Robinson		
August 14, 2025 (season premiere)	The Outfit		
September 18, 2025	Fela Kuti: Fear No Man	Won 2025 Peabody Award	
October 6, 2025 (season premiere)	The Second Opinion with Dr. Sharon		
