= 6th Critics' Choice Documentary Awards =

Critics' Choice Documentary Awards 2021

- Date: November 14, 2021
- Site: BRIC, Brooklyn, United States
- Hosted by: Roy Wood Jr.
- Official website: www.criticschoice.com

The 6th Critics' Choice Documentary Awards were presented on November 14, 2021 at the BRIC in Brooklyn, New York, honoring the finest achievements in documentary filmmaking and non-fiction television. It was hosted by Roy Wood Jr.

Ascension and Summer of Soul (...Or, When the Revolution Could Not Be Televised) led the nominations with six each with the latter winning all of its nominations.

== Winners and nominees ==
The nominations were announced on October 18, 2021.

Best Documentary Feature: Summer of Soul (...Or, When the Revolution Could Not Be Televised); Ascension; Attica; Becoming Cousteau; The Crime of the Century; A Crime on the Bayou; Flee; Introducing, Selma Blair; The Lost Leonardo; My Name Is Pauli Murray; Procession; The Rescue
Best Director: Elizabeth Chai Vasarhelyi and Jimmy Chin – The Rescue; Ahmir "Questlove" Thompson – Summer of Soul (...Or, When the Revolution Could Not Be Televised); Liz Garbus – Becoming Cousteau; Jessica Kingdon – Ascension; Stanley Nelson Jr. and Traci A. Curry – Attica; Jonas Poher Rasmussen – Flee; Edgar Wright – The Sparks Brothers	Best First Documentary Feature: Ahmir "Questlove" Thompson – Summer of Soul (...Or, When the Revolution Could Not Be Televised); Jessica Beshir – Faya Dayi; Rachel Fleit – Introducing, Selma Blair; Todd Haynes – The Velvet Underground; Jessica Kingdon – Ascension; Kristine Stolakis – Pray Away; Edgar Wright – The Sparks Brothers
Best Archival Documentary: Summer of Soul (...Or, When the Revolution Could Not Be Televised); Becoming Cousteau; The Real Charlie Chaplin; The Real Right Stuff; Street Gang: How We Got to Sesame Street; Val; The Velvet Underground	Best Short Documentary: The Queen of Basketball; Audible; Borat's American Lockdown; Camp Confidential: America's Secret Nazis; Day of Rage: How Trump Supporters Took the U.S. Capitol; The Doll; The Last Cruise; Snowy
Best Political Documentary: The Crime of the Century; Enemies of the State; Four Hours at the Capitol; Influence; Mayor Pete; Missing in Brooks County; Nasrin; Not Going Quietly	Best Sports Documentary: The Alpinist; Changing the Game; The Day Sports Stood Still; Kevin Garnett: Anything is Possible; LFG; Tiger
Best Historical or Biographical Documentary: Val; Attica; A Crime on the Bayou; Fauci; Final Account; Julia; My Name Is Pauli Murray; No Ordinary Man	Best Science/Nature Documentary: Becoming Cousteau; Fauci; The First Wave; The Loneliest Whale: The Search for 52; Playing with Sharks; Puff: Wonders of the Reef; The Year Earth Changed
Best Narration: Val – Jack Kilmer, narrator; Val Kilmer, writer; 9/11: Inside the President's War Room – Jeff Daniels, narrator; Becoming Cousteau – Vincent Cassel, narrator; Mark Monroe and Pax Wassermann, writers; The Crime of the Century – Alex Gibney, narrator and writer; The Neutral Ground – CJ Hunt, narrator and writer; The Real Charlie Chaplin – Pearl Mackie, narrator; Oliver Kindeberg, Peter Middleton and James Spinney, writers; The Year Earth Changed – David Attenborough, narrator	Most Compelling Living Subject of a Documentary: Ady Barkan – Not Going Quietly; Selma Blair – Introducing, Selma Blair; Pete Buttigieg – Mayor Pete; Anthony Fauci – Fauci; Ben Fong-Torres – Like a Rolling Stone: The Life and Times of Ben Fong-Torres; Val Kilmer – Val; Ron and Russell Mael – The Sparks Brothers; Rita Moreno – Rita Moreno: Just a Girl Who Decided to Go for It; Valerie Taylor – Playing With Sharks: The Valerie Taylor Story
Best Music Documentary: Summer of Soul (...Or, When the Revolution Could Not Be Televised); Billie Eilish: The World's a Little Blurry; Bitchin': The Sound and Fury of Rick James; Listening to Kenny G; The Sparks Brothers; Tina; The Velvet Underground	Best Score: Daniel Pemberton – The Rescue; Jongnic Bontemps – My Name is Pauli Murray; Dan Deacon – Ascension; Alex Lasarenko and David Little – The Loneliest Whale: The Search for 52; Cyrus Melchor – LFG; Rachel Portman – Julia; Dirac Sea – Final Account
Best Cinematography: David Katznelson, Ian Seabrook and Picha Srisansanee – The Rescue; Jessica Beshir – Faya Dayi; Jonathan Griffith, Brett Lowell and Austin Siadak – The Alpinist; Nelson Hume and Alan Jacobsen – The Loneliest Whale: The Search for 52; Jessica Kingdon and Nathan Truesdell – Ascension; Emiliano Villanueva – A Cop Movie; Pete West – Puff: Wonders of the Reef	Best Editing: Joshua L. Pearson – Summer of Soul (...Or, When the Revolution Could Not Be Televised); Francisco Bello, Matthew Heineman, Gabriel Rhodes and David Zieff – The First Wave; Jeff Consiglio – LFG; Bob Eisenhardt – The Rescue; Affonso Gonçalves and Adam Kurnitz – The Velvet Underground; Jessica Kingdon – Ascension; Julian Quantrill – The Real Charlie Chaplin

=== Pennebaker Award ===
- R. J. Cutler

== Films with multiple nominations ==
Films with multiple nominations
Nominations	Film
6	Ascension
6	Summer of Soul (...Or, When the Revolution Could Not Be Televised)
5	Becoming Cousteau
5	The Rescue
4	The Sparks Brothers
4	Val
4	The Velvet Underground
3	Attica
3	The Crime of the Century
3	Fauci
3	Introducing, Selma Blair
3	LFG
3	The Loneliest Whale: The Search for 52
3	My Name Is Pauli Murray
3	The Real Charlie Chaplin
2	The Alpinist
2	A Crime on the Bayou
2	Faya Dayi
2	Final Account
2	The First Wave
2	Flee
2	Julia
2	Mayor Pete
2	Not Going Quietly
2	Playing With Sharks: The Valerie Taylor Story
2	Puff: Wonders of the Reef
2	The Year Earth Changed

Films with multiple wins
Wins	Film
6	Summer of Soul (...Or, When the Revolution Could Not Be Televised)
3	The Rescue
2	Val

== See also ==
- 94th Academy Awards
