= Critics Choice Documentary Award for Best Director =

Award

Critics' Choice Documentary Award for Best Director
- Nathan Fielder Lance Oppenheim 2026 co-recipients
- Awarded for: Best Documentary Director
- Country: United States
- Presented by: Critics Choice Association
- First award: 2016
- Currently held by: Nathan Fielder and Lance Oppenheim for You Can See Everything
- Website: Critics Choice Documentary Awards

The Critics' Choice Documentary Award for Best Director is one of the awards presented annually by Critics Choice Association since the awards debuted in 2016.

== Winners and nominees ==
Table key
indicates the winner	‡ Indicates the winner of Best Documentary Feature

=== 2010s ===
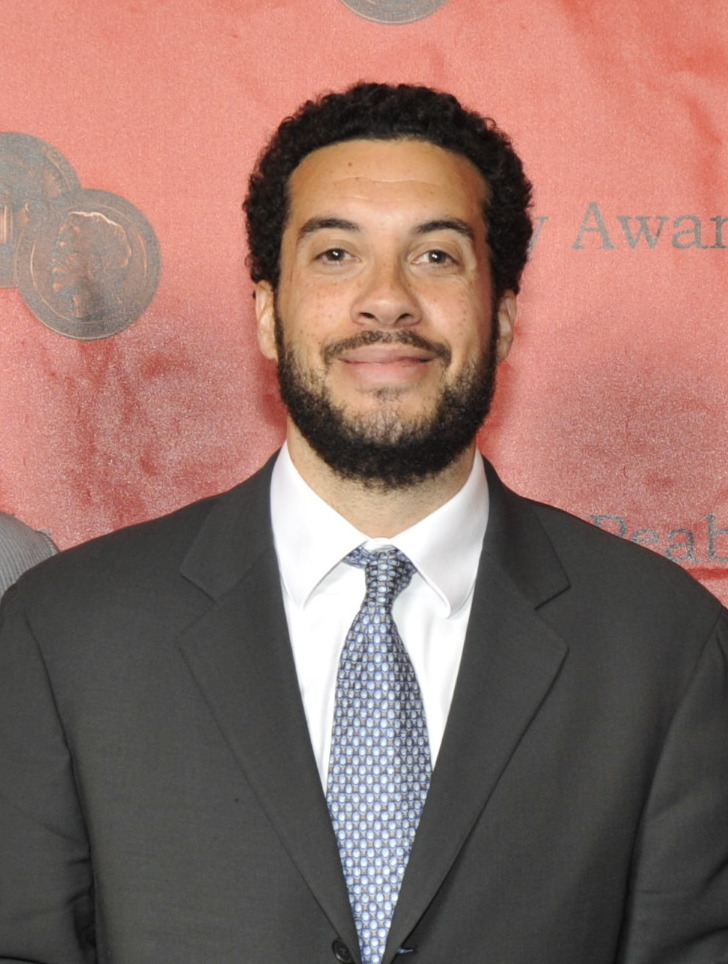
Ezra Edelman won the award at the inaugural ceremony for the ESPN 30 for 30 documentary O.J.: Made in America

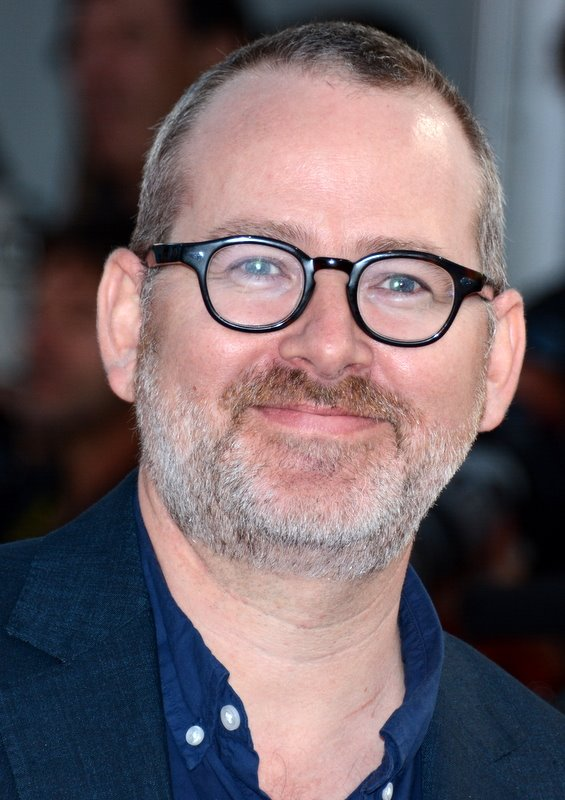
Morgan Neville won for directing Won't You Be My Neighbor?

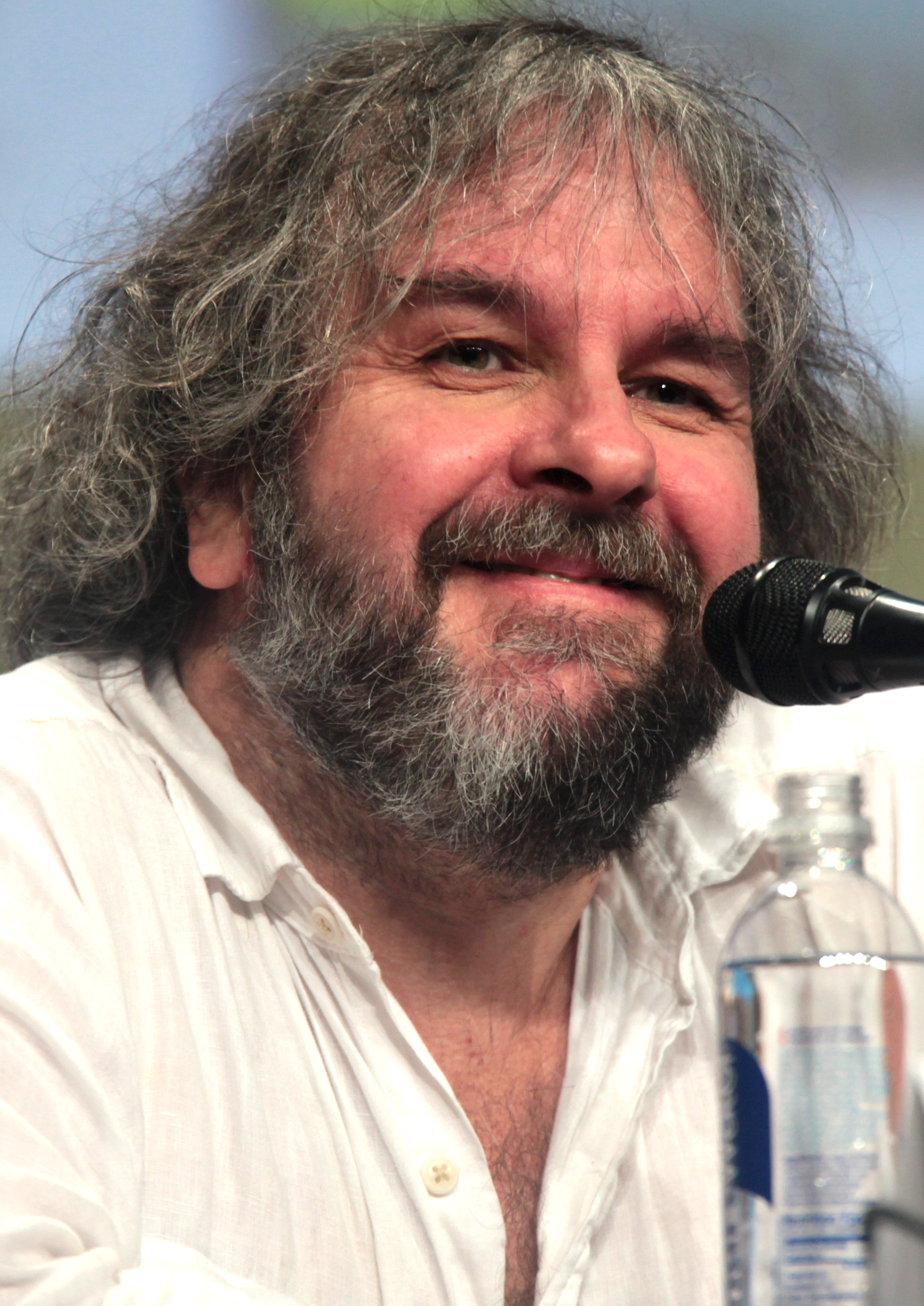
Peter Jackson won for They Shall Not Grow Old in 2019

Year	Director(s)	Film	Ref.
2016 (1st)	Ezra Edelman	O.J.: Made in America‡	
2016 (1st)	Ron Howard	The Beatles: Eight Days a Week	
2016 (1st)	Kirsten Johnson	Cameraperson	
2016 (1st)	Keith Maitland	Tower	
2016 (1st)	Clay Tweel	Gleason	
2016 (1st)	Roger Ross Williams	Life, Animated	
2017 (2nd)	Evgeny Afineevsky	Cries from Syria	
2017 (2nd)	Frederick Wiseman	Ex Libris: The New York Public Library	
2017 (2nd)	Amir Bar-Lev	Long Strange Trip	
2017 (2nd)	Matthew Heineman	City of Ghosts	
2017 (2nd)	Bill Morrison	Dawson City: Frozen Time	
2017 (2nd)	Doug Nichol	California Typewriter	
2017 (2nd)	Jeff Orlowski	Chasing Coral	
2017 (2nd)	Irene Taylor Brodsky	Beware the Slenderman	
2017 (2nd)	Ceyda Torun	Kedi	
2017 (2nd)	Agnès Varda and JR	Faces Places	
2018 (3rd)	Morgan Neville	Won't You Be My Neighbor?‡	
2018 (3rd)	Jimmy Chin and Elizabeth Chai Vasarhelyi	Free Solo	
2018 (3rd)	Bing Liu	Minding the Gap	
2018 (3rd)	Kimberly Reed	Dark Money	
2018 (3rd)	Rudiger Suchsland	Hitler's Hollywood	
2018 (3rd)	Tim Wardle	Three Identical Strangers	
2019 (4th)	Peter Jackson	They Shall Not Grow Old	
2019 (4th)	Steven Bognar and Julia Reichert	American Factory	
2019 (4th)	Waad Al-Kateab and Edward Watts	For Sama	
2019 (4th)	John Chester	The Biggest Little Farm	
2019 (4th)	Feras Fayyad	The Cave	
2019 (4th)	Todd Douglas Miller	Apollo 11‡	
2019 (4th)	Nanfu Wang and Jialing Zhang	One Child Nation	

=== 2020s ===
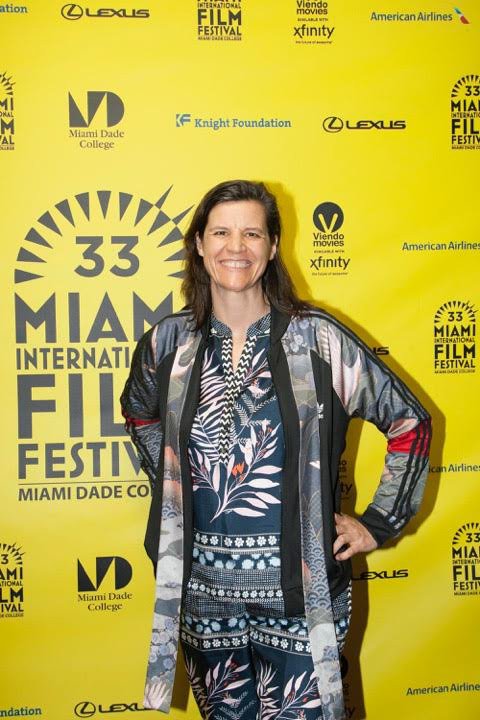
Kirsten Johnson won once from two nominations for Dick Johnson Is Dead in 2020

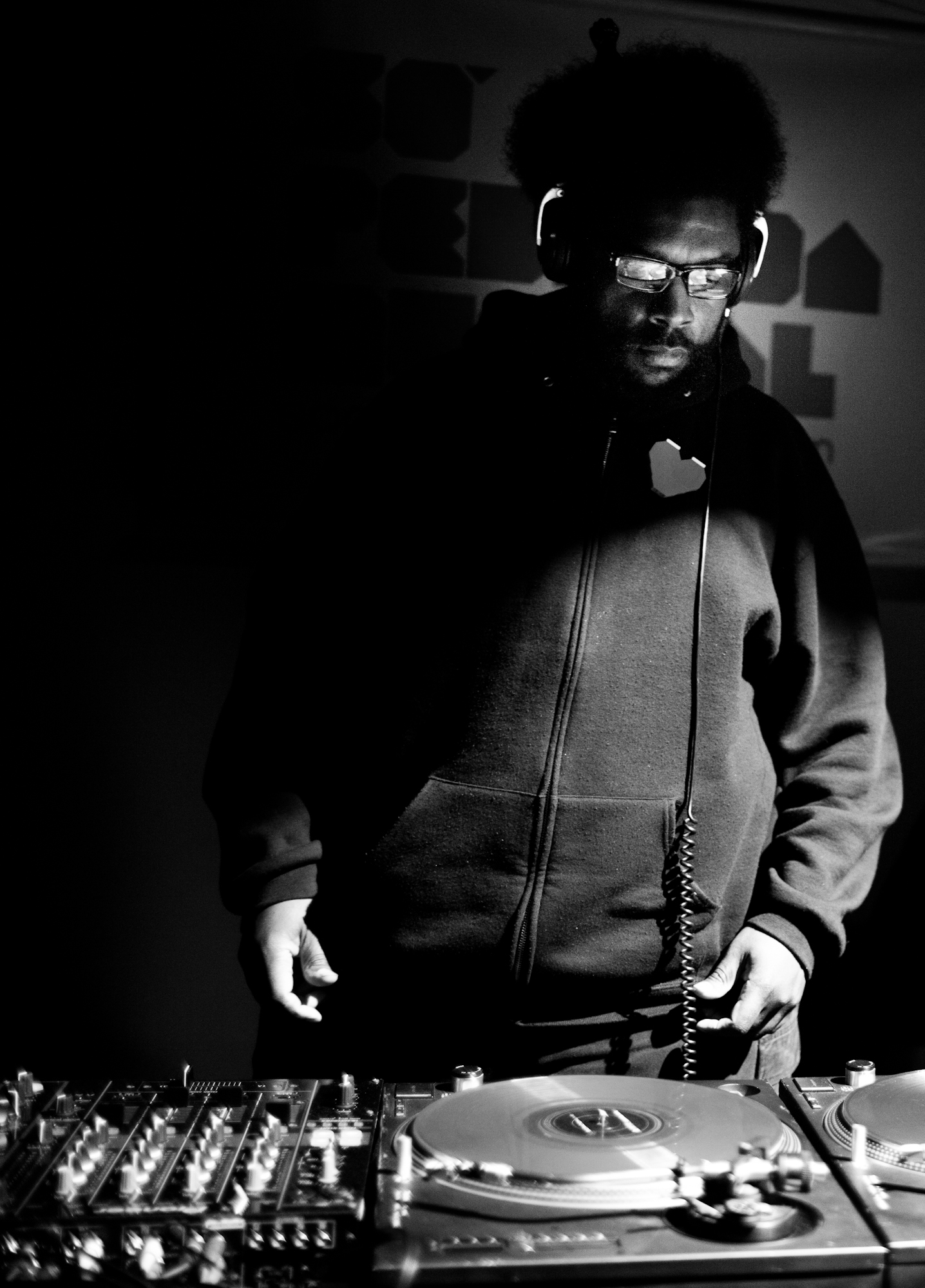
Questlove won in 2021 for the Harlem Cultural Festival documentary Summer of Soul

Year	Director(s)	Film	Ref.
2020 (5th)	Kirsten Johnson	Dick Johnson Is Dead‡	
2020 (5th)	Garrett Bradley	Time	
2020 (5th)	Bonni Cohen and Jon Shenk	Athlete A	
2020 (5th)	Victor Kossakovsky	Gunda	
2020 (5th)	James Lebrecht and Nicole Newnham	Crip Camp: A Disability Revolution	
2020 (5th)	Dawn Porter	John Lewis: Good Trouble	
2020 (5th)	Benjamin Ree	The Painter and the Thief	
2021 (6th)	Elizabeth Chai Vasarhelyi and Jimmy Chin	The Rescue	
2021 (6th)	Ahmir "Questlove" Thompson	Summer of Soul (…Or, When the Revolution Could Not Be Televised)‡	
2021 (6th)	Liz Garbus	Becoming Cousteau	
2021 (6th)	Jessica Kingdon	Ascension	
2021 (6th)	Stanley Nelson Jr. and Traci A. Curry	Attica	
2021 (6th)	Jonas Poher Rasmussen	Flee	
2021 (6th)	Edgar Wright	The Sparks Brothers	
2022 (7th)	Ryan White	Good Night Oppy‡	
2022 (7th)	Judd Apatow and Michael Bonfiglio	George Carlin's American Dream	
2022 (7th)	Margaret Brown	Descendant	
2022 (7th)	Sara Dosa	Fire of Love	
2022 (7th)	Reginald Hudlin	Sidney	
2022 (7th)	Brett Morgen	Moonage Daydream	
2022 (7th)	Laura Poitras	All the Beauty and the Bloodshed	
2022 (7th)	Daniel Roher	Navalny	
2023 (8th)	Davis Guggenheim	Still: A Michael J. Fox Movie‡	
2023 (8th)	Maite Alberdi	The Eternal Memory	
2023 (8th)	Madeleine Gavin	Beyond Utopia	
2023 (8th)	Matthew Heineman	American Symphony	
2023 (8th)	Amanda McBaine	The Mission	
2023 (8th)	Steve McQueen	Occupied City	
2024 (9th)	Ian Bonhôte and Peter Ettedgui	Super/Man: The Christopher Reeve Story‡	
2024 (9th)	Josh Greenbaum	Will & Harper	
2024 (9th)	Ron Howard	Jim Henson Idea Man	
2024 (9th)	Julian Brave NoiseCat and Emily Kassie	Sugarcane	
2024 (9th)	Natalie Rae and Angela Patton	Daughters	
2024 (9th)	Benjamin Ree	The Remarkable Life of Ibelin	
2025 (10th)	Geeta Gandbhir	The Perfect Neighbor‡	
2025 (10th)	Mstyslav Chernov	2000 Meters to Andriivka	
2025 (10th)	Petra Costa	Apocalypse in the Tropics	
2025 (10th)	Nyle DiMarco and Davis Guggenheim	Deaf President Now!	
2025 (10th)	Andrew Jarecki & Charlotte Kaufman	The Alabama Solution	
2025 (10th)	Raoul Peck	Orwell: 2+2=5	
2026 (11th)	Nathan Fielder and Lance Oppenheim	You Can See Everything‡	
2026 (11th)	Yuval Abraham and Rachel Szor	NAZA	
2026 (11th)	Felipe Bustos Sierra	Everybody to Kenmure Street	
2026 (11th)	Ava DuVernay	14th	
2026 (11th)	Ross McElwee	Remake	
2026 (11th)	Orlando von Einsiedel	The Cycle of Love	

== Multiple nominations ==
Nominations	Director
2	Jimmy Chin
2	David Guggenheim
2	Ron Howard
2	Kirsten Johnson
2	Benjamin Ree
2	Elizabeth Chai Vasarhelyi
