= Summer of Soul =

2021 documentary film by Questlove

Summer of Soul (...or, When the Revolution Could Not Be Televised)
- Theatrical release poster
- Directed by: Questlove
- Produced by: David Dinerstein; Robert Fyvolent; Joseph Patel
- Cinematography: Shawn Peters
- Edited by: Joshua L. Pearson
- Production companies: Onyx Collective; Concordia Studio; Play/Action Pictures; LarryBilly Productions; Mass Distraction Media; RadicalMedia; Vulcan Productions
- Distributed by: Searchlight Pictures; Hulu
- Release dates: January 28, 2021 (Sundance); June 25, 2021 (United States)
- Running time: 117 minutes
- Country: United States
- Language: English
- Box office: $3.7 million

Summer of Soul (...or, When the Revolution Could Not Be Televised) is a 2021 American independent documentary film about the 1969 Harlem Cultural Festival, directed by Ahmir "Questlove" Thompson in his directorial debut. It had its world premiere at the 2021 Sundance Film Festival on January 28, 2021, where it won the Grand Jury Prize and Audience Award in the documentary categories. It had a limited theatrical release in the U.S. by Searchlight Pictures on June 25, 2021, before expanding and being released for streaming on Hulu the next weekend.

The second half of the movie's title is taken from the 1970 poem and song "The Revolution Will Not Be Televised", written by Gil Scott-Heron. It offered a sharp and satirical critique of the media's lack of coverage of civil rights activism and the reality of change and revolution taking place in the streets and on campuses across America.

The film received acclaim from critics, with particular praise given to the restoration of the footage used. It won numerous awards, including Best Documentary Feature at the 6th Critics' Choice Documentary Awards, where it won in all six categories in which it was nominated, Best Documentary at the 75th British Academy Film Awards, Best Documentary Feature at the 94th Academy Awards, and Best Music Film at the 64th Annual Grammy Awards. It has been considered one of the best films of the 21st century.

== Synopsis ==
The film examines the 1969 Harlem Cultural Festival, which took place on six Sundays between June 29 and August 24 at Mount Morris Park (now Marcus Garvey Park) in Harlem, using professional footage of the festival that was filmed as it happened, stock news footage, and modern-day interviews with attendees, musicians, and other commentators to provide historical background and social context. Despite its large attendance and performers such as Stevie Wonder, Mahalia Jackson, David Ruffin, Max Roach, Nina Simone, The 5th Dimension, The Staple Singers, Gladys Knight & the Pips, Mavis Staples, Blinky Williams, Sly and the Family Stone, and the Chambers Brothers, the festival is much less well known in the 21st century than is Woodstock (which took place on the same weekend as one of the days of the Harlem Cultural Festival). The filmmakers investigate this, among other topics.

== Production ==
Clapperboard from original videotape recordings of the 1969 Harlem Cultural Festival

At the request of festival organizer and host Tony Lawrence, television producer Hal Tulchin recorded about 40 hours of footage of the 1969 Harlem Cultural Festival on videotape, excerpts from which were packaged as two one-hour TV specials that were broadcast in 1969, one on CBS in July, and one on ABC in September. The tapes were then placed in a basement, where they sat for the next 50 years. Tulchin attempted to interest broadcasters in the recordings for several years, but had little success, though some of the footage of Nina Simone was eventually used in documentaries about her.

In 2004, Joe Lauro, a film archivist at the Historic Films Archive, discovered the existence of the footage and contacted Hal Tulchin, hoping to work on a film about the festival. He digitized and cataloged the footage and, in 2006, entered into a deal with Robert Gordon and Morgan Neville to make the film, but the project never saw the light of day, as Tulchin discontinued his agreement with Lauro. Producer Robert Fyvolent, who had originally sought to work with Lauro, then acquired film and television rights to the footage from Tulchin. Fyvolent began collaborating with producer David Dinerstein in 2016, and together they engaged RadicalMedia and editor Josh Pearson, and added a third producer, Joseph Patel.

Director Ahmir “Questlove” Thompson has expressed surprise that the footage sat for so long, and that he had never heard of the festival before the producers approached him about making the film. Discussing its obscurity, he said: "What would have happened if this was allowed a seat at the table? How much of a difference would that have made in my life? That was the moment that extinguished any doubt I had that I could do this."

== Release ==
The film premiered on January 28, 2021, at the Sundance Film Festival, where it won the Grand Jury Prize and Audience Award in the US Documentary Competition. It was acquired by Searchlight Pictures and Hulu, and was released in the United States at the El Capitan Theatre in Los Angeles and the AMC Magic Johnson Harlem 9 multiplex in New York City on June 25, 2021, before expanding nationwide and being released for streaming on Hulu the next weekend. The film was distributed in theaters in several other countries via Buena Vista International and later on Disney+ Hotstar on July 30, 2021, and on Disney+ and Star+ on November 19, 2021, and was made available on the U.S. version of Disney+ on February 8, 2022, in time for Black History Month. It made its broadcast television premiere on ABC on February 20, 2022. On February 8, 2022, 20th Century Studios released a hard copy on Standard Definition DVD. In a bonus feature interview, Thompson mused about expanding the film with the wealth of material he had to cut for time.

On April 22, 2021, it was announced that Thompson would introduce the first trailer for the film during the 93rd Academy Awards, for which he served as music director. The trailer debuted on April 25, 2021.

== Reception ==
=== Box office ===
Summer of Soul grossed $2.3 million in the U.S. and Canada, and $1.4 million in other territories, for a worldwide total of $3.7 million.

In the film's first weekend in wide release, it grossed $650,000 from 752 theaters (for a per-venue average of $865).

=== Critical response ===
On Rotten Tomatoes, the film has an approval rating of 99% (based on 222 reviews), with an average rating of 9.1/10; the website's critics consensus reads: "Deftly interweaving incredible live footage with a series of revealing interviews, Summer of Soul captures the spirit and context of a watershed moment while tying it firmly to the present." On Metacritic, the film has a weighted average score of 96 out of 100 (based on 38 critics), indicating "universal acclaim". Audiences polled by CinemaScore gave the film a rare "A+" average grade.

Rolling Stone praised the film as "the Perfect Movie to Kick Off Sundance 2021" and said it was "an incredible, vital act of restoration—and reclamation". The Guardian gave it five stars, writing that there is "a moment so striking and rich with power at the center of Ahmir 'Questlove' Thompson's Summer of Soul (…Or, When The Revolution Could Not Be Televised) that, while watching it, I actually forgot to breathe."

British critic Mark Kermode called the film "the best music documentary I've ever seen" in his review for Kermode and Mayo's Film Review on BBC Radio 5 Live.

Filmmaker John Waters and former U.S. President Barack Obama cited it as among their favorite films of 2021.

In 2024, Looper ranked it number 3 on its list of the "50 Best PG-13 Movies of All Time," writing "The 1969 Harlem Cultural Festival was a milestone event that featured countless Black artists performing music from all genres, but for decades, it faded into obscurity. Fortunately, director Ahmir "Questlove" Thompson's documentary, Summer of Soul, reaffirms the existence, presence, and joy of this seemingly forgotten moment with restored archival footage of the performances that comprised this event."

=== Awards and nominations ===
Award	Date of ceremony	Category	Recipient(s)	Result	Ref.
Sundance Film Festival	February 3, 2021	Grand Jury Prize – Documentary	Summer of Soul (...Or, When the Revolution Could Not Be Televised)	Won	
Sundance Film Festival	February 3, 2021	Audience Awards – Documentary	Summer of Soul (...Or, When the Revolution Could Not Be Televised)	Won	
Critics' Choice Documentary Awards	November 14, 2021	Best Documentary Feature	Summer of Soul (...Or, When the Revolution Could Not Be Televised)	Won	
Critics' Choice Documentary Awards	November 14, 2021	Best Archival Documentary	Summer of Soul (...Or, When the Revolution Could Not Be Televised)	Won	
Critics' Choice Documentary Awards	November 14, 2021	Best Music Documentary	Summer of Soul (...Or, When the Revolution Could Not Be Televised)	Won	
Critics' Choice Documentary Awards	November 14, 2021	Best First Documentary Feature	Ahmir "Questlove" Thompson	Won	
Critics' Choice Documentary Awards	November 14, 2021	Best Director	Ahmir "Questlove" Thompson (tied with Elizabeth Chai Vasarhelyi and Jimmy Chin for The Rescue)	Won	
Critics' Choice Documentary Awards	November 14, 2021	Best Editing	Joshua L. Pearson	Won	
Gotham Independent Film Awards	November 29, 2021	Best Documentary Feature	Summer of Soul (...Or, When the Revolution Could Not Be Televised)	Nominated	
National Board of Review	December 3, 2021	Documentary Film	Summer of Soul (...Or, When the Revolution Could Not Be Televised)	Won	
Detroit Film Critics Society	December 6, 2021	Best Documentary	Summer of Soul (...Or, When the Revolution Could Not Be Televised)	Won (Note: Tied with Flee)	
Washington D.C. Area Film Critics Association Awards	December 6, 2021	Best Documentary	Summer of Soul (...Or, When the Revolution Could Not Be Televised)	Won	
Boston Society of Film Critics Awards	December 12, 2021	Best Documentary	Summer of Soul (...Or, When the Revolution Could Not Be Televised)	Won	
Chicago Film Critics Association Awards	December 15, 2021	Best Documentary	Summer of Soul (...Or, When the Revolution Could Not Be Televised)	Won	
Los Angeles Film Critics Association Awards	December 18, 2021	Best Documentary/Non-Fiction Film	Summer of Soul (...Or, When the Revolution Could Not Be Televised)	Won	
Los Angeles Film Critics Association Awards	December 18, 2021	Best Editing	Joshua L. Pearson	Won	
Dallas–Fort Worth Film Critics Association	December 20, 2021	Best Documentary Film	Summer of Soul (...Or, When the Revolution Could Not Be Televised)	Won	
Florida Film Critics Circle Awards	December 21, 2021	Best Documentary Film	Summer of Soul (...Or, When the Revolution Could Not Be Televised)	Won	
Alliance of Women Film Journalists Awards	January 2022	Best Documentary	Summer of Soul (...Or, When the Revolution Could Not Be Televised)	Won	
San Francisco Bay Area Film Critics Circle	January 10, 2022	Best Documentary Feature	Summer of Soul (...Or, When the Revolution Could Not Be Televised)	Won	
San Diego Film Critics Society	January 10, 2021	Best Documentary	Summer of Soul (...Or, When the Revolution Could Not Be Televised)	Won	
San Diego Film Critics Society	January 10, 2021	Best Editing	Joshua L. Pearson	Nominated	
Austin Film Critics Association	January 11, 2022	Best Documentary	Summer of Soul (...Or, When the Revolution Could Not Be Televised)	Won	
Toronto Film Critics Association	January 16, 2022	Best Documentary Film	Summer of Soul (...Or, When the Revolution Could Not Be Televised)	Won	
Seattle Film Critics Society	January 17, 2022	Best Documentary Feature	Summer of Soul (...Or, When the Revolution Could Not Be Televised)	Won	
Houston Film Critics Society Awards	January 19, 2022	Best Documentary Feature	Summer of Soul (...Or, When the Revolution Could Not Be Televised)	Won	
Online Film Critics Society Awards	January 24, 2022	Best Documentary	Summer of Soul (...Or, When the Revolution Could Not Be Televised)	Won	
London Film Critics Circle Awards	February 6, 2022	Documentary of the Year	Summer of Soul (...Or, When the Revolution Could Not Be Televised)	Won	
Black Reel Awards	February 27, 2022	Outstanding Documentary Feature	Summer of Soul (...Or, When the Revolution Could Not Be Televised)	Won	
Black Reel Awards	February 27, 2022	Outstanding Emerging Director	Ahmir "Questlove" Thompson	Nominated	
Cinema Eye Honors	March 1, 2022	Outstanding Non-Fiction Feature	Ahmir "Questlove" Thompson, Joseph Patel, Robert Fyvolent, and David Dinerstein	Nominated	
Cinema Eye Honors	March 1, 2022	Outstanding Direction	Ahmir "Questlove" Thompson	Nominated	
Cinema Eye Honors	March 1, 2022	Outstanding Debut	Ahmir "Questlove" Thompson	Nominated	
Cinema Eye Honors	March 1, 2022	Audience Choice Prize	Ahmir "Questlove" Thompson	Nominated	
Cinema Eye Honors	March 1, 2022	Outstanding Editing	Joshua L. Pearson	Won	
Cinema Eye Honors	March 1, 2022	Outstanding Sound Design	Jimmy Douglass and Paul Hsu	Nominated	
American Cinema Editors Awards	March 5, 2022	Best Edited Documentary – Feature	Joshua L. Pearson	Won	
Cinema Audio Society Awards	March 6, 2022	Outstanding Achievement in Sound Mixing for a Motion Picture – Documentary	Paul Hsu, Roberto Fernandez, Paul Massey	Won	
Independent Spirit Awards	March 6, 2022	Best Documentary Feature	Summer of Soul (...Or, When the Revolution Could Not Be Televised)	Won	
Vancouver Film Critics Circle Awards	March 7, 2022	Best Documentary	Summer of Soul (...Or, When the Revolution Could Not Be Televised)	Nominated	
Directors Guild of America Awards	March 12, 2022	Outstanding Directorial Achievement in Documentaries	Ahmir "Questlove" Thompson	Nominated	
Golden Reel Awards	March 13, 2022	Outstanding Achievement in Sound Editing – Feature Documentary	Joshua L. Pearson, Jimmy Douglass	Nominated	
British Academy Film Awards	March 13, 2022	Best Documentary	Ahmir "Questlove" Thompson, Joseph Patel, Robert Fyvolent, and David Dinerstein	Won	
British Academy Film Awards	March 13, 2022	Best Editing	Joshua L. Pearson	Nominated	
Dorian Awards	March 17, 2022	Best Documentary	Summer of Soul (...Or, When the Revolution Could Not Be Televised)	Nominated	
Satellite Awards	April 2, 2022	Best Documentary Film	Summer of Soul (...Or, When the Revolution Could Not Be Televised)	Won	
Producers Guild of America Awards	March 19, 2022	Outstanding Producer of Documentary Motion Pictures	Joseph Patel, David Dinerstein, and Robert Fyvolent	Won	
Academy Awards	March 27, 2022	Best Documentary Feature	Ahmir "Questlove" Thompson, Joseph Patel, Robert Fyvolent and David Dinerstein	Won	
Grammy Awards	April 3, 2022	Best Music Film	Ahmir "Questlove" Thompson (video director); David Dinerstein, Robert Fyvolent, and Joseph Patel (video producers)	Won	
Peabody Awards	June 6–9, 2022	Arts	Summer of Soul (…or, When the Revolution Could Not Be Televised)	Won	

== Soundtrack ==
On January 21, 2022, Legacy Records released an official soundtrack album. In an interview, Thompson said he considered including songs not in the film, but decided to stick with the music that had already been cleared for release. The digital version of the soundtrack contains 17 songs, while the physical version contains 16, as it does not feature Abbey Lincoln's and Max Roach's performance of "Africa".

== Home media ==
On February 8, 2022, 20th Century Studios released the film on Standard Definition DVD. Bonus features include audio commentary by Thompson, who muses about re-editing a longer version that would include footage he had to cut for time, and two behind-the-scenes featurettes ("Soul Searching" and "Harlem: Then & Now").

== See also ==
- Festival (1967)
- Monterey Pop (1968)
- Gimme Shelter (1970)
