= Becoming Cousteau =

2021 American documentary film

- Theatrical release poster
- Directed by: Liz Garbus
- Written by: Pax Wasserman; Mark Monroe
- Produced by: Liz Garbus; Dan Cogan; Mridu Chandra; Evan Hayes
- Edited by: Pax Wasserman
- Music by: Danny Bensi; Saunder Jurriaans
- Production companies: National Geographic Documentary Films; Story Syndicate; ACE Content
- Distributed by: Picturehouse
- Release dates: September 2, 2021 (Telluride); October 22, 2021 (United States)
- Running time: 91 minutes
- Country: United States
- Languages: English; French
- Box office: $264,530

Becoming Cousteau is a 2021 American documentary film directed and produced by Liz Garbus. It follows the life and career of Jacques Cousteau.

It premiered at the Telluride Film Festival on September 2, 2021, and was released on October 22, 2021, by Picturehouse.

== Synopsis ==
The film follows the life and career of Jacques Cousteau, who tried to warn the world for decades about environmental issues.

== Production ==
In 2015, National Geographic Documentary Films approached Liz Garbus about directing a documentary film revolving around Jacques Cousteau, and she agreed. Over the course of five years, Garbus worked with The Cousteau Society to get access to unseen footage.

In May 2019, it was announced Garbus would direct a documentary film revolving around Cousteau, with Cousteau Society Archives producing and with National Geographic Documentary Films set to produce.

== Release ==
It had its world premiere at the 48th Telluride Film Festival on September 2, 2021. It had its international premiere at the Toronto International Film Festival on September 10, 2021. It was released on October 22, 2021, by Picturehouse.

== Reception ==
=== Critical reception ===
Becoming Costeau holds a 98% approval rating on review aggregator website Rotten Tomatoes, based on 60 reviews, with a weighted average of 7.50/10. The website's critics consensus reads, "As visually thrilling as it is edifying, Becoming Cousteau pays fitting tribute to a pioneering explorer and environmental advocate." On Metacritic, the film holds a rating of 74 out of 100, based on 16 critics, indicating "generally favorable" reviews.

=== Accolades ===
| Award | Date of ceremony | Category | Recipient(s) | Result | Ref. |
|---|---|---|---|---|---|
| BFI London Film Festival | October 17, 2021 | Grierson Award for Best Documentary | Becoming Cousteau | Won | |
| British Academy Film Awards | March 13, 2022 | Best Documentary | Liz Garbus and Dan Cogan | Nominated | |
| Cinema Audio Society Awards | March 19, 2022 | Outstanding Achievement in Sound Mixing for a Motion Picture – Documentary | Phil McGowan, Tony Volante | Nominated | |
| Cinema Eye Honors | March 1, 2022 | Audience Choice Prize | Liz Garbus | Nominated | |
| Cinema Eye Honors | March 1, 2022 | Outstanding Graphic Design/Animation | Daniel Rutledge | Nominated | |
| Critics' Choice Documentary Awards | November 14, 2021 | Best Documentary Feature | Becoming Cousteau | Nominated | |
| Critics' Choice Documentary Awards | November 14, 2021 | Best Director | Liz Garbus | Nominated | |
| Critics' Choice Documentary Awards | November 14, 2021 | Best Narration | Vincent Cassel, Mark Monroe and Pax Wassermann | Nominated | |
| Critics' Choice Documentary Awards | November 14, 2021 | Best Archival Documentary | Becoming Cousteau | Nominated | |
| Critics' Choice Documentary Awards | November 14, 2021 | Best Science/Nature Documentary | Becoming Cousteau | Won | |
| Golden Trailer Awards | October 6, 2022 | Best Documentary | Becoming Cousteau | Nominated | |
| Hollywood Music in Media Awards | November 17, 2021 | Best Original Score – Documentary Film | Daniel Bensi and Saunder Jurriaans | Nominated | |
| Writers Guild of America Awards | March 20, 2022 | Best Documentary Screenplay | Mark Monroe and Pax Wasserman | Nominated | |
