= National Board of Review Awards 2021 =

American film award

93rd NBR Awards
Best Film: Licorice Pizza

The 93rd National Board of Review Awards, honoring the best in film for 2021, were announced on December 2, 2021. The gala was held on March 15, 2022, at Cipriani 42nd Street in New York City.

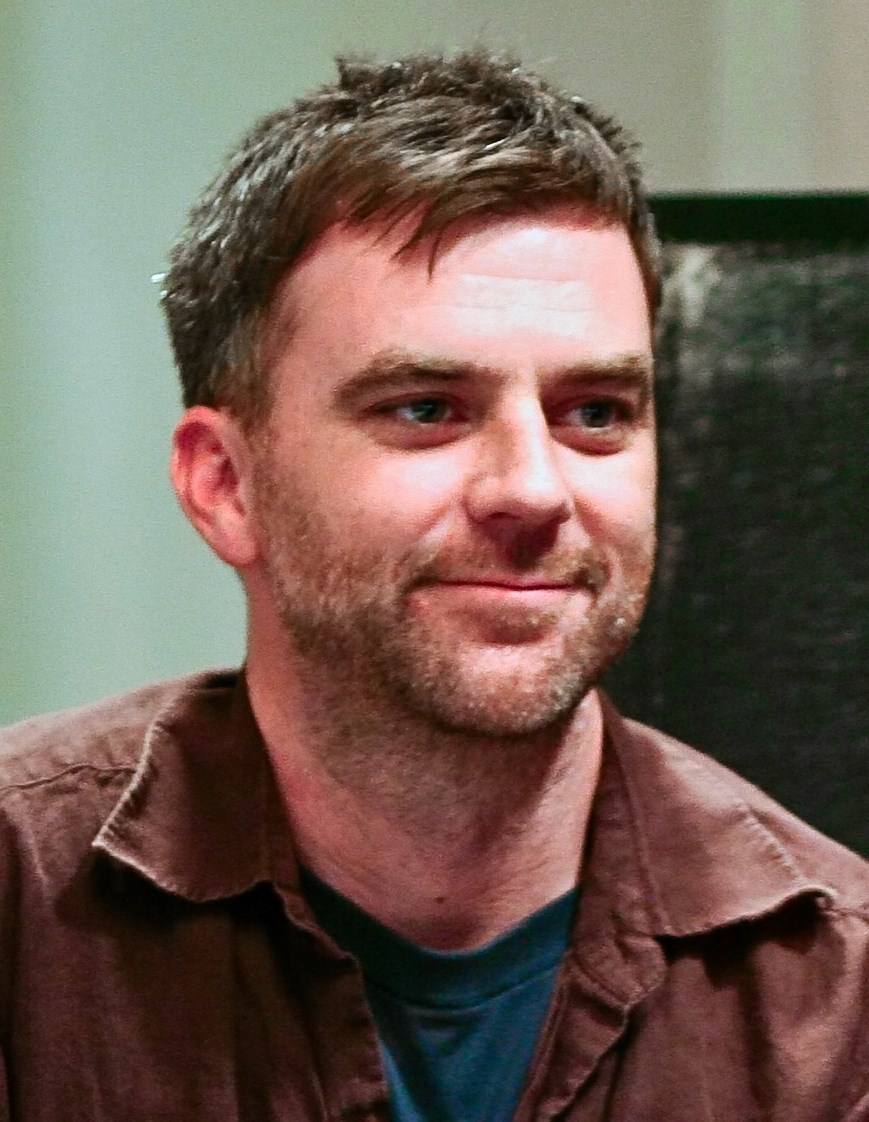
Paul Thomas Anderson, Best Director winner

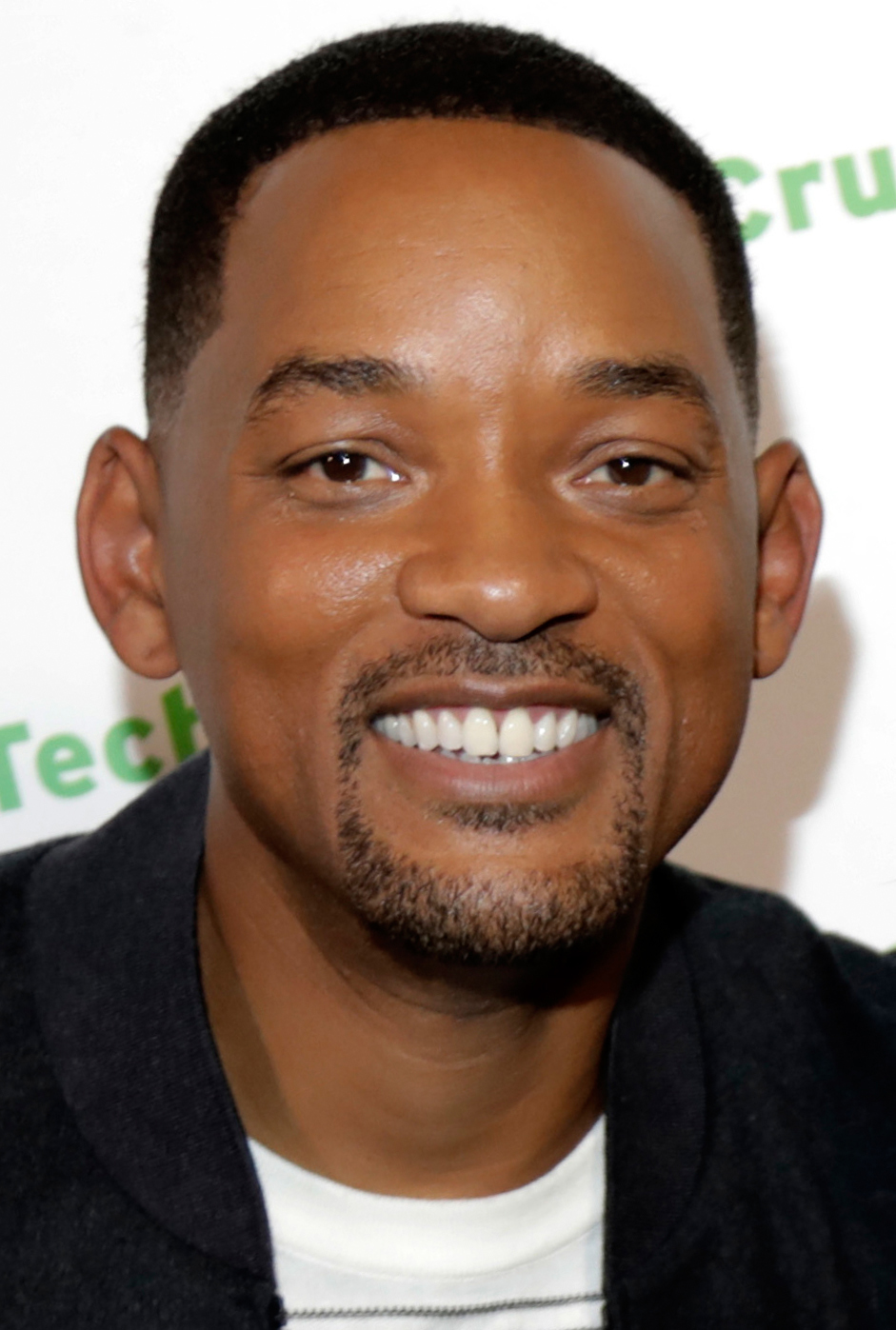
Will Smith, Best Actor winner

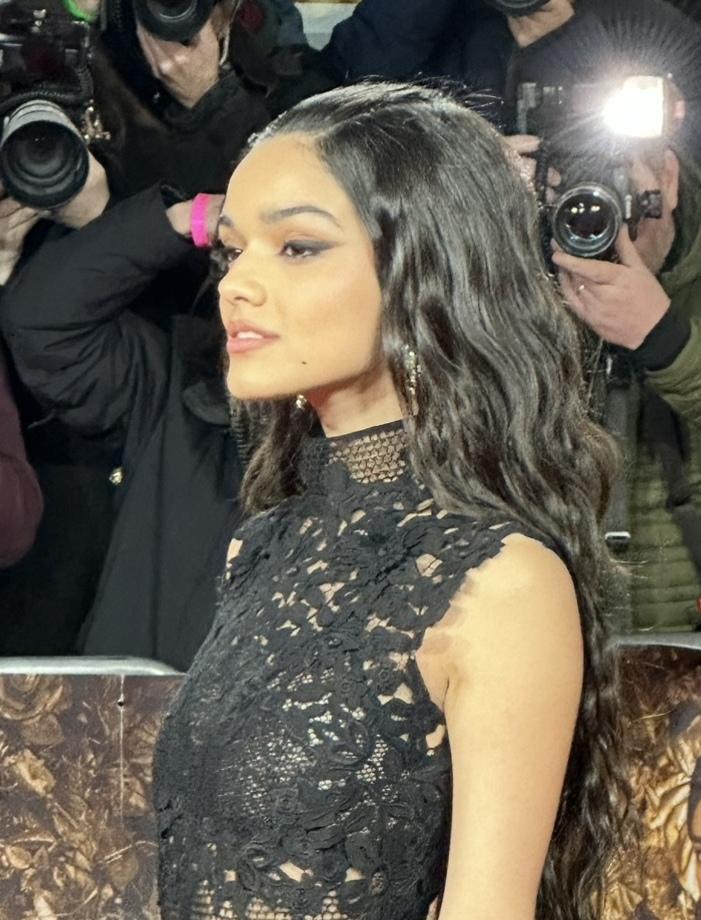
Rachel Zegler, Best Actress winner

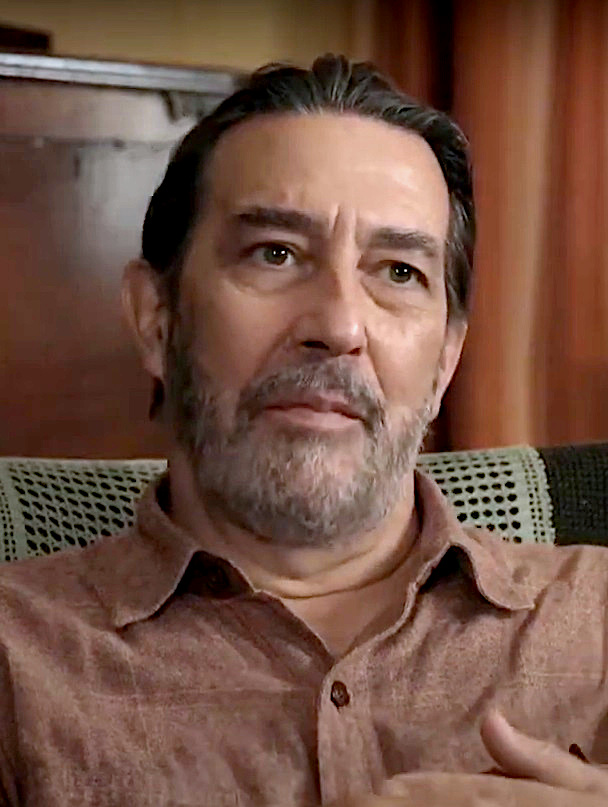
Ciarán Hinds, Best Supporting Actor winner

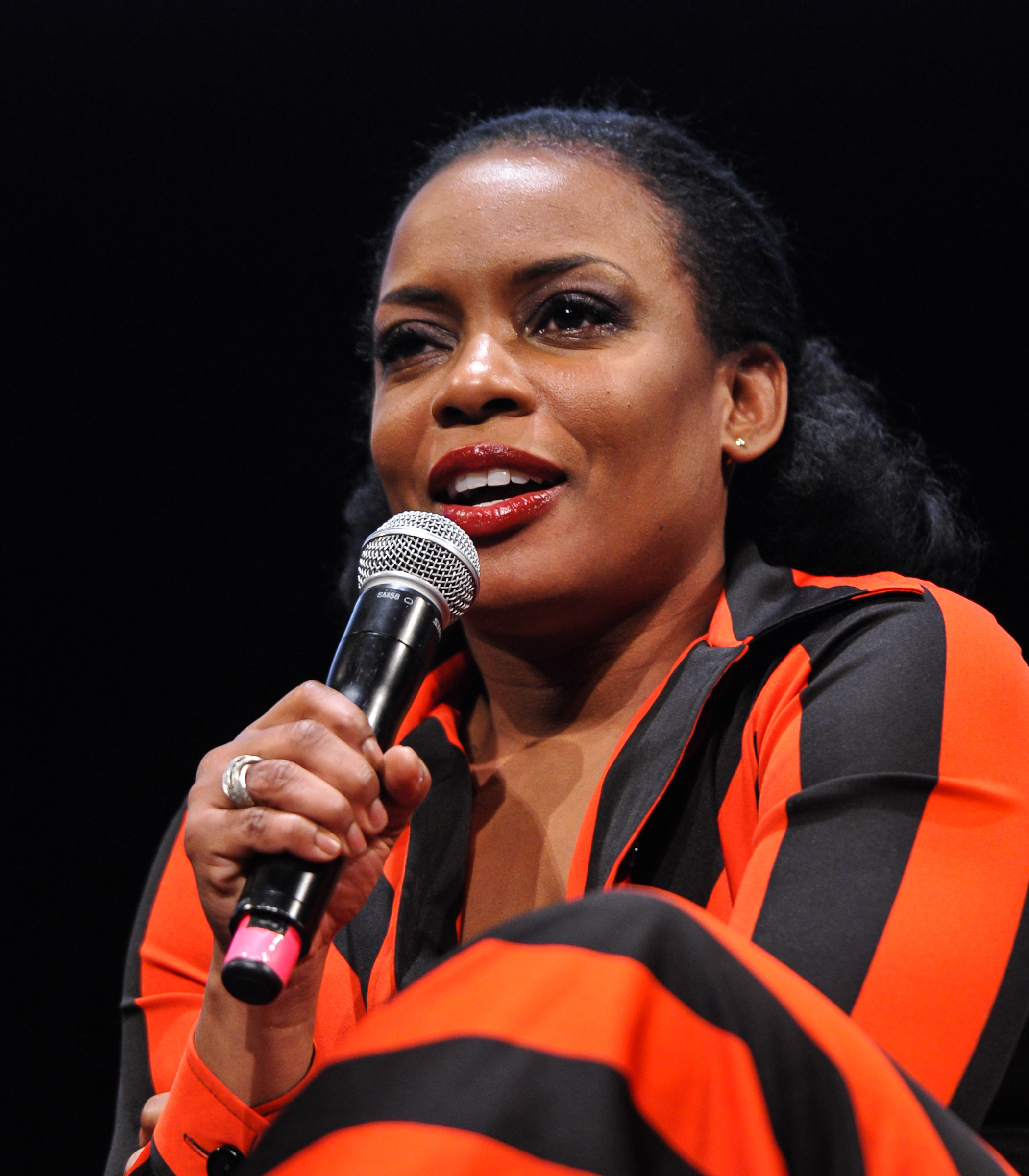
Aunjanue Ellis-Taylor, Best Supporting Actress winner

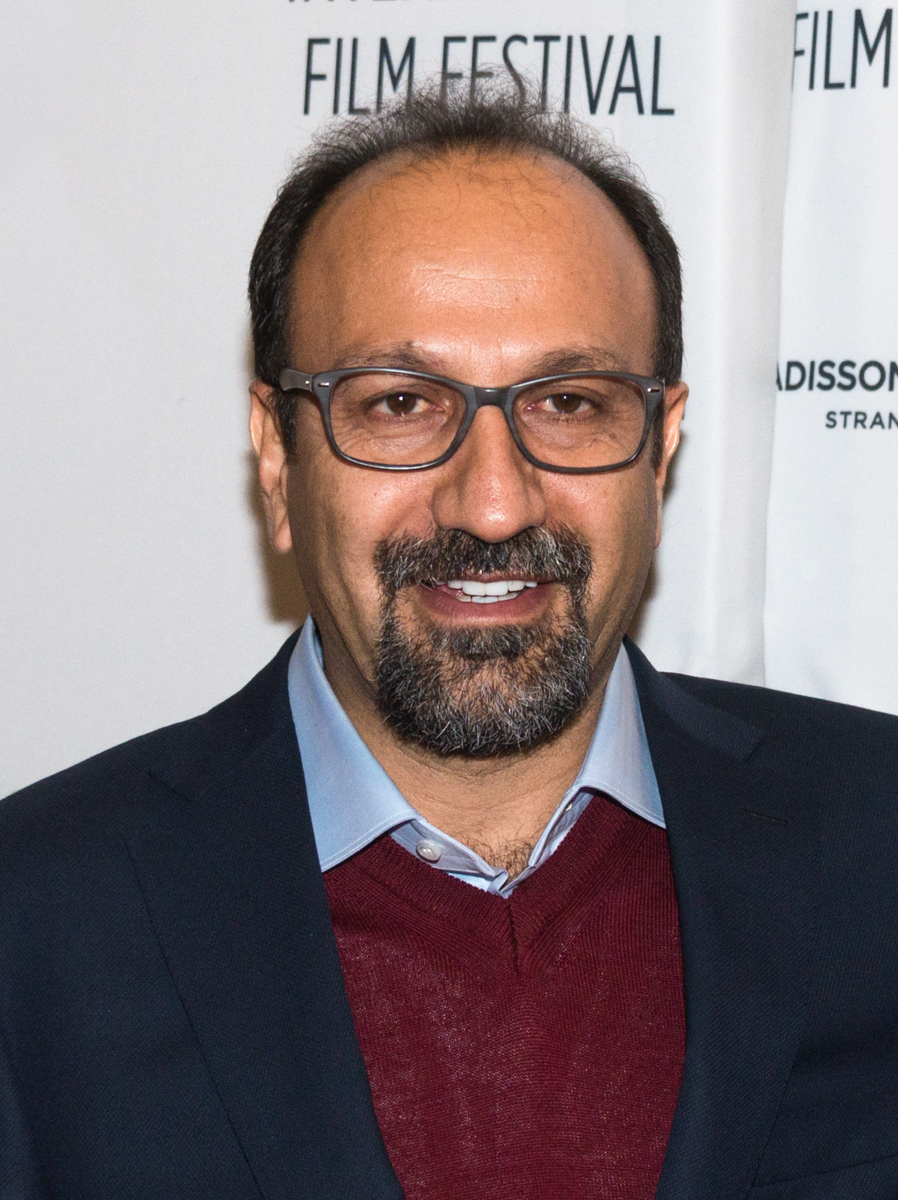
Asghar Farhadi, Best Original Screenplay winner

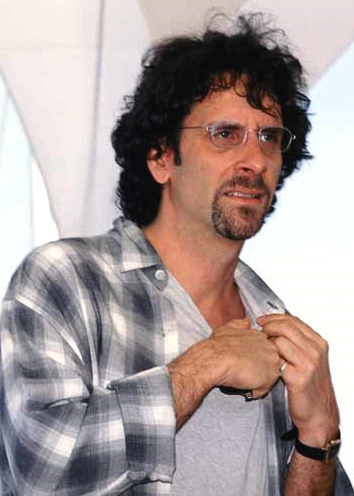
Joel Coen, Best Adapted Screenplay winner

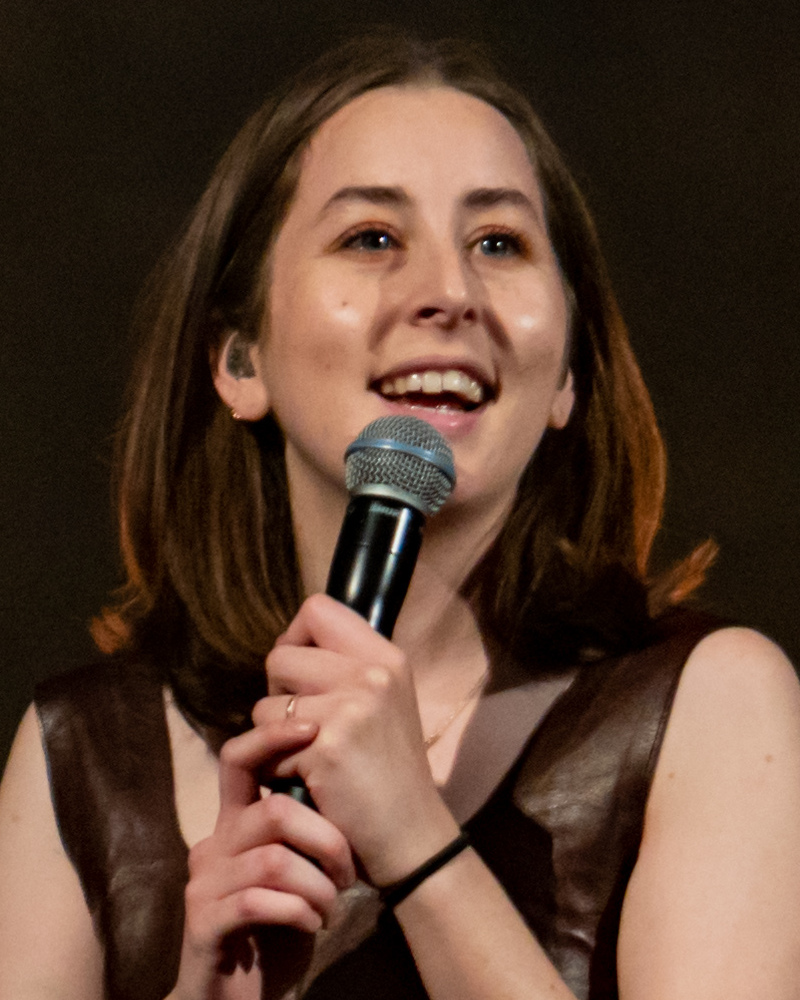
Alana Haim, Breakthrough Performance co-winner

== Top 10 Films ==
Films listed alphabetically except top, which is ranked as Best Film of the Year:

Licorice Pizza

- Belfast
- Don't Look Up
- Dune
- King Richard
- The Last Duel
- Nightmare Alley
- Red Rocket
- The Tragedy of Macbeth
- West Side Story

== Winners ==
Best Film:

- Licorice Pizza

Best Director:

- Paul Thomas Anderson – Licorice Pizza

Best Actor:

- Will Smith – King Richard

Best Actress:

- Rachel Zegler – West Side Story

Best Supporting Actor:

- Ciarán Hinds – Belfast

Best Supporting Actress:

- Aunjanue Ellis-Taylor – King Richard

Best Original Screenplay:

- Asghar Farhadi – A Hero

Best Adapted Screenplay:

- Joel Coen – The Tragedy of Macbeth

Best Animated Feature:

- Encanto

Best Foreign Language Film:

- A Hero

Best Documentary:

- Summer of Soul (...Or When the Revolution Could Not Be Televised)

Best Ensemble:

- The Harder They Fall

Breakthrough Performance:

- Alana Haim and Cooper Hoffman – Licorice Pizza

Best Directorial Debut:

- Michael Sarnoski – Pig

Outstanding Achievement in Cinematography:

- Bruno Delbonnel – The Tragedy of Macbeth

NBR Freedom of Expression:

- Flee

== Top 5 Foreign Films ==
A Hero

- Benedetta
- Lamb
- Lingui, The Sacred Bonds
- Titane
- The Worst Person in the World

== Top 5 Documentaries ==
Summer of Soul (...Or When the Revolution Could Not Be Televised)

- Ascension
- Attica
- Flee
- The Rescue
- Roadrunner: A Film About Anthony Bourdain

== Top 10 Independent Films ==
- The Card Counter
- C'mon C'mon
- CODA
- The Green Knight
- Holler
- Jockey
- Old Henry
- Pig
- Shiva Baby
- The Souvenir Part II
