= Renegades: Born in the USA =

2021 podcast series hosted by Barack Obama and Bruce Springsteen

Cast and voices
- Hosted by: Barack Obama; Bruce Springsteen

Publication
- No. of episodes: 8

Renegades: Born in the USA is a 2021 podcast series hosted by former U.S. president Barack Obama and singer-songwriter Bruce Springsteen.

== Episodes ==
No.	Title	Runtime	Original release date
1	"Our Unlikely Friendship"	53 min	February 22, 2021
2	"Race in the United States"	42 min	February 22, 2021
3	"American Music"	42 min	March 1, 2021
4	"Traveling the U.S. & Finding Home"	45 min	March 8, 2021
5	"Money & The American Dream"	48 min	March 15, 2021
6	"Relationships with Our Fathers & Masculinity"	38 min	March 22, 2021
7	"Fatherhood"	41 min	March 29, 2021
8	"Looking Towards American Renewal"	51 min	April 5, 2021

== Production ==
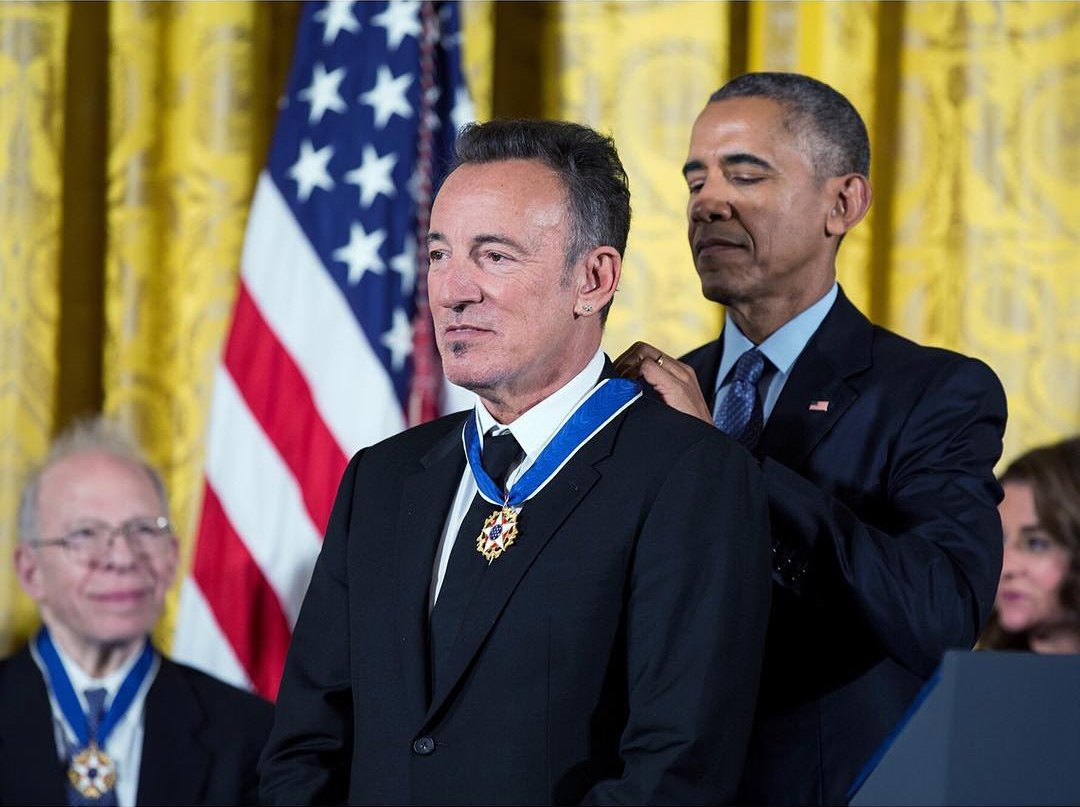
President Barack Obama (back) awards Bruce Springsteen (front) the Presidential Medal of Freedom in November 2016.

Springsteen and Obama became friends on the campaign trail for Obama's 2008 United States presidential election campaign. Dan Fierman, the head of Higher Ground Audio, said that Michelle Obama's experience producing The Michelle Obama Podcast influenced Barack's decision to launch one himself. In 2019, the Obamas' production company, Higher Ground Productions, signed an exclusive podcast deal with Spotify. Comcast and Dollar Shave Club sponsored the series.

The first recording session took place on July 30, 2020. The podcast was recorded at Springsteen's home in Colts Neck Township, New Jersey.

== Reception ==
James Marriot of The Times rated the series four out of five stars. Slate's Jody Rosen criticized the series, writing that the series "promises difficult conversations about race, but it avoids the actual difficulties." Jon Garelick, writing on NBC News, criticized Obama and Springsteen for partnering with Spotify. David Klion described the podcast as "bland" and "boring" in his review for The New Republic.

== Book ==
In October 2021, a book was published based on the podcast.
