= Hollywood Music in Media Award for Best Original Score in a Documentary =

Film score award

Hollywood Music in Media for Best Original Score in a Documentary
- Country: United States
- Presented by: Hollywood Music in Media Awards (HMMA)
- First award: 2014
- Currently held by: Kris Bowers; The Eyes of Ghana (2026)
- Website: hmmawards.com

The Hollywood Music in Media Award for Best Original Score in a Documentary is one of the awards given annually to people working in the motion picture and television industry by the Hollywood Music in Media Awards (HMMA).

== History ==
It is presented to the composers who have composed the best "original" score, written specifically for a documentary, either film or television. The award was first given in 2014, during the fifth annual awards.

== Winners and nominees ==
=== 2010s ===
Year	Film	Nominees
(2014); 5th
(2014); 5th	Merchants of Doubt	Mark Adler
(2014); 5th	American Revolutionary: The Evolution of Grace Lee Boggs	Vivek Maddala
(2014); 5th	Born to Fly	Adam Crystal
(2014); 5th	H.O.P.E. Was Here	Emilio D. Miler
(2014); 5th	Red Army	Christophe Beck & Leo Birenberg
(2015); 6th
(2015); 6th	The Hunting Ground	Miriam Cutler
(2015); 6th	Donne Nel Mito Sophia Loren Racconta La Loren	Max Di Carlo
(2015); 6th	Frame by Frame	Patrick Jonsson
(2015); 6th	Teresa de Jesús	Francisco-José Cuenca
(2015); 6th	Rafael Corpa	Wild Iberia
(2016); 7th
(2016); 7th	Command and Control	Mark Adler
(2016); 7th	Asperger's Are Us	Crystal Grooms Mangano
(2016); 7th	Before the Flood	Trent Reznor & Atticus Ross, Gustavo Santaolalla and Mogwai
(2016); 7th	The Little Prince	Nick Cave & Warren Ellis
(2016); 7th	Tig	Ryan Miller
(2017); 8th
(2017); 8th	Jane	Philip Glass
(2017); 8th	Boston	Jeff Beal
(2017); 8th	Chasing Coral	Dan Romer & Saul Simon MacWilliams
(2017); 8th	Chef's Table	Duncan Thum, Sebastian Örnemark and Steve Gernes
(2017); 8th	The Keepers: "The Conclusion"	Blake Neely
(2017); 8th	LA 92	Danny Bensi & Saunder Jurriaans
(2018); 9th
(2018); 9th	March of the Penguins: The Next Step	Cyrille Aufort
(2018); 9th	Free Solo	Marco Beltrami
(2018); 9th	One Strange Rock	Daniel Pemberton, Simon Ashdown and Will Slater
(2018); 9th	On Her Shoulders	Patrick Jonsson
(2018); 9th	RBG	Miriam Cutler
(2018); 9th	Science Fair	Jeff Morrow
(2018); 9th	Won't You Be My Neighbor?	Jonathan Kirkscey
(2019); 10th
(2019); 10th	The Biggest Little Farm	Jeff Beal
(2019); 10th	Apollo 11	Matt Morton
(2019); 10th	The Elephant Queen	Alex Heffes
(2019); 10th	Toni Morrison: The Pieces I Am	Kathryn Bostic
(2019); 10th	Untouchable: The Rise and Fall of Harvey Weinstein	Dan Levy
(2019); 10th	What's My Name: Muhammad Ali	Marcelo Zarvos

=== 2020s ===
Year	Film	Nominees
(2020); 11th
(2020); 11th	David Attenborough: A Life on Our Planet	Steven Price
(2020); 11th	Athlete A	Jeff Beal
(2020); 11th	Crip Camp	Bear McCreary
(2020); 11th	John Lewis: Good Trouble	Tamar-kali
(2020); 11th	Rising Phoenix	Daniel Pemberton
(2021); 12th
(2021); 12th	Julia	Rachel Portman
(2021); 12th	14 Peaks: Nothing Is Impossible	Nainita Desai
(2021); 12th	Becoming Cousteau	Danny Bensi & Saunder Jurriaans
(2021); 12th	Operation Varsity Blues: The College Admissions Scandal	Nick Chuba, Atticus Ross & Leopold Ross
(2021); 12th	The Rescue	Daniel Pemberton
(2021); 12th	Strip Down, Rise Up	Lili Haydn
(2022); 13th
(2022); 13th	The Tinder Swindler	Jessica Jones
(2022); 13th	Black Ice	Simon Poole
(2022); 13th	Descendant	Ray Angry, Rhiannon Giddens, and Dirk Powell
(2022); 13th	Gratitude Revealed	Lisbeth Scott
(2022); 13th	Landis: Just Watch Me	Emilie and Peter Bernstein
(2022); 13th	Turn Every Page: The Adventures of Robert Caro and Robert Gottlieb	Clare Manchon and Olivier Manchon
(2023); 14th
(2023); 14th	Still: A Michael J. Fox Movie	John Powell
(2023); 14th	Kangaroo Valley	H. Scott Salinas and Logan Stahley
(2023); 14th	Split at the Root	Lili Haydn
(2023); 14th	The Deepest Breath	Nainita Desai
(2023); 14th	The Pigeon Tunnel	Philip Glass and Paul Leonard-Morgan
(2024); 15th
(2024); 15th	Super/Man: The Christopher Reeve Story	Ilan Eshkeri
(2024); 15th	Diane Von Furstenberg: Woman in Charge	Allyson Newman
(2024); 15th	Endurance	Daniel Pemberton
(2024); 15th	Frida	Victor Hernández Stumpfhauser
(2024); 15th	Jim Henson Idea Man	David Fleming
(2024); 15th	The Donn of Tiki	Holly Amber Church
(2024); 15th	Will & Harper	Nathan Halpern
(2025); 16th
(2025); 16th	Pangolin: Kulu's Journey	Anne Nikitin
(2025); 16th	Arrest the Midwife	Allyson Newman
(2025); 16th	Why We Dream	Christian Lundberg
(2025); 16th	An American Miracle	Lolita Ritmanis
(2025); 16th	The Last Dive	Paul Leonard-Morgan
(2025); 16th	John Candy: I Like Me	Tyler Strickland
(2026); 17th
(2026); 17th	The Eyes of Ghana	Kris Bowers
(2026); 17th	Avedon	David Fleming
(2026); 17th	Running Wild: Return to the River	Alex Heffes
(2026); 17th	The Cycle of Love	Patrick Jonsson
(2026); 17th	The Truth and Tragedy of Moriah Wilson	Marco Beltrami
(2026); 17th	You Can See Everything	Ari Balouzian
