= Attica (2021 film) =

2021 documentary film by Stanley Nelson and Traci Curry

- Poster
- Directed by: Traci Curry; Stanley Nelson
- Written by: Stanley Nelson
- Produced by: Traci Curry; Stanley Nelson
- Edited by: Aljernon Tunsil
- Music by: Tom Phillips
- Production companies: Showtime Documentary Films; Firelight Films; Topic Studios
- Distributed by: Showtime
- Release dates: September 9, 2021 (TIFF); October 29, 2021 (United States)
- Running time: 116 minutes
- Country: United States
- Language: English

Attica is a 2021 American documentary film by Stanley Nelson and Traci Curry.

The film had its world premiere at the 2021 Toronto International Film Festival on September 9, 2021, and premiered on Showtime on October 29, 2021. At the 94th Academy Awards, the film was nominated for Best Documentary Feature.

== Summary ==
The film is a 50-year look back at the 1971 Attica uprising through interviews with the mostly black and Latino inmates who were there.

== Reception ==
On the review aggregator website Rotten Tomatoes, 100% of 56 critics' reviews are positive, with an average rating of 8.4/10. The website's consensus reads: "Attica revisits the titular riot with intelligence, compassion, and anger, presenting a version of events that honors history as much as it exemplifies the art of documentary filmmaking." Metacritic, which uses a weighted average, assigned the film a score of 87 out of 100, based on 11 critics, indicating "universal acclaim".

== Accolades ==
Award	Date	Category	Recipient	Result	Ref.
Academy Awards	March 27, 2022	Best Documentary Feature	Stanley Nelson and Traci A. Curry	Nominated	
Critics' Choice Documentary Awards	November 14, 2021	Best Documentary Feature	Attica	Nominated	
Critics' Choice Documentary Awards	November 14, 2021	Best Director	Stanley Nelson and Traci A. Curry	Nominated	
Critics' Choice Documentary Awards	November 14, 2021	Best Historical or Biographical Documentary	Attica	Nominated	
Directors Guild of America Awards	March 12, 2022	Outstanding Directorial Achievement in Documentaries	Stanley Nelson	Won	
FOCAL International Awards	June 23, 2022	Best Use of Footage in a Cinematic Feature	Attica	Nominated	
FOCAL International Awards	June 23, 2022	Best Use of Footage in a History Feature	Attica	Nominated	
FOCAL International Awards	June 23, 2022	The Jane Mercer Researcher of the Year Award	Rosemary Rotondi	Nominated	
NAACP Image Awards	February 26, 2022	Outstanding Documentary (Film)	Attica	Nominated	
National Board of Review Awards	December 2, 2021	Top 5 Documentaries	Ascension	Won	
Peabody Awards	June 6–9, 2022	Documentary	Attica	Nominated	
