= Critics Choice Documentary Award for Best Documentary Feature =

American film award

Critics' Choice Documentary Award for Best Documentary Feature
- Awarded for: Best Documentary Feature
- Country: United States
- Presented by: Critics Choice Association
- First award: 2016
- Currently held by: You Can See Everything (A24)
- Website: Critics Choice Documentary Awards

The Critics' Choice Documentary Award for Best Documentary Feature is one of the awards presented annually by Critics Choice Association since the awards debuted in 2016.

== History ==
In 2022, the top three documentaries of the year were honored, with gold, silver, and bronze awards in the category.

== Winners and nominees ==
indicates the winner

=== 2010s ===
Year	Film	Production companies and distributors	Ref.
2016 (1st)	O.J.: Made in America	ESPN and Laylow Films	
2016 (1st)	13th	Netflix and Kandoo Films	
2016 (1st)	Cameraperson	Janus Films, Fork Films, and Big Mouth Productions	
2016 (1st)	Fire at Sea	Kino Lorber, Stemal Entertainment, 21 Unofilm, Cinecittà Luce, Rai Cinema, Les Films d'Ici, and Arte France Cinéma	
2016 (1st)	Gleason	Open Road Films, Amazon Studios, and Exhibit A	
2016 (1st)	Life, Animated	A&E IndieFilms, The Orchard, Motto Pictures, and Roger Ross Williams Productions	
2016 (1st)	Tickled	Magnolia Pictures, A Ticklish Tale, Fumes Production, and Horseshoe Films	
2016 (1st)	Tower	Kino Lorber, ITVS, Meredith Vieira Productions, GTS Films, and Diana DiMenna Film	
2016 (1st)	Weiner	Sundance Selects, Motto Pictures, and Edgeline Films	
2016 (1st)	The Witness	FilmRise and Five More Minutes Productions	
2017 (2nd)	Jane	National Geographic Documentary Films, National Geographic Studios, and Public Road Productions	
2017 (2nd)	Abacus: Small Enough to Jail	PBS, Blue Ice Films, Mitten Media, Motto Pictures, and Kartemquin Films Production	
2017 (2nd)	Beware the Slenderman	HBO, Warner Bros. Television Distribution, HBO Documentary Films, and Vermilion Films	
2017 (2nd)	Bright Lights: Starring Carrie Fisher and Debbie Reynolds	HBO, Bloomfish Pictures, HBO Documentary Films, Insurgent Docs, and RatPac Documentary Films	
2017 (2nd)	California Typewriter	Gravitas Ventures and American Buffalo Pictures	
2017 (2nd)	Chasing Coral	Netflix and Exposure Labs	
2017 (2nd)	City of Ghosts	Amazon Studios, A&E IndieFilms, IFC Films, and Our Time Projects	
2017 (2nd)	Cries from Syria	HBO, Afineevsky – Tolmor Production, Cinepost Barrandov, Levy Entertainment Group, and Studio Malibu	
2017 (2nd)	Dawson City: Frozen Time	Kino Lorber, Hypnotic Pictures, and Picture Palace Pictures	
2017 (2nd)	Eagles of Death Metal: Nos Amis (Our Friends)	HBO, Live Nation Productions, and Company Name	
2017 (2nd)	Ex Libris: The New York Public Library	Zipporah Films	
2017 (2nd)	Faces Places	Cohen Media Group, Ciné Tamaris, Social Animals, Rouge International, Arte France Cinéma, and Arches Films	
2017 (2nd)	Kedi	Oscilloscope Laboratories, YouTube Red, and Termite Films	
2017 (2nd)	One of Us	Netflix and Loki Films	
2017 (2nd)	Spettacolo	Grasshopper Film and Open Face	
2017 (2nd)	Strong Island	Netflix, Yanceville Films, and Louverture Films	
2018 (3rd)	Won't You Be My Neighbor?	Focus Features	
2018 (3rd)	Crime + Punishment	Hulu	
2018 (3rd)	Dark Money	PBS	
2018 (3rd)	Free Solo	National Geographic Documentary Films	
2018 (3rd)	Hal	Oscilloscope	
2018 (3rd)	Hitler's Hollywood	Kino Lorber	
2018 (3rd)	Minding the Gap	Hulu	
2018 (3rd)	RBG	Magnolia Pictures and Participant Media	
2018 (3rd)	Three Identical Strangers	Neon and CNN Films	
2018 (3rd)	Wild Wild Country	Netflix	
2019 (4th)	Apollo 11	Neon	
2019 (4th)	American Factory	Netflix	
2019 (4th)	The Biggest Little Farm	Neon	
2019 (4th)	The Cave	National Geographic	
2019 (4th)	Honeyland	Neon	
2019 (4th)	The Kingmaker	Showtime	
2019 (4th)	Knock Down the House	Netflix	
2019 (4th)	Leaving Neverland	HBO	
2019 (4th)	Maiden	Sony Pictures Classics	
2019 (4th)	One Child Nation	Amazon Studios	
2019 (4th)	They Shall Not Grow Old	Warner Bros.	

=== 2020s ===
Year	Film	Production companies and distributors	Ref.
2020 (5th)	Dick Johnson Is Dead	Netflix	
2020 (5th)	Athlete A	Netflix	
2020 (5th)	Belushi	Showtime	
2020 (5th)	Crip Camp: A Disability Revolution	Netflix	
2020 (5th)	Feels Good Man	Giant Pictures	
2020 (5th)	The Fight	Magnolia Pictures	
2020 (5th)	The Go-Go's	Showtime	
2020 (5th)	Gunda	Neon	
2020 (5th)	Mr. Soul!	Shoes in the Bed Productions	
2020 (5th)	My Octopus Teacher	Netflix	
2020 (5th)	The Painter and the Thief	Neon	
2020 (5th)	A Secret Love	Netflix	
2020 (5th)	The Social Dilemma	Netflix	
2020 (5th)	Time	Amazon Studios	
2021 (6th)	Summer of Soul (…Or, When the Revolution Could Not Be Televised)	Searchlight Pictures and Hulu	
2021 (6th)	Ascension	MTV Documentary Films	
2021 (6th)	Attica	Showtime	
2021 (6th)	Becoming Cousteau	Picturehouse and National Geographic Documentary Films	
2021 (6th)	The Crime of the Century	HBO Documentary Films	
2021 (6th)	A Crime on the Bayou	Shout! Studios	
2021 (6th)	Flee	Neon and Participant	
2021 (6th)	Introducing, Selma Blair	Discovery+	
2021 (6th)	The Lost Leonardo	Sony Pictures Classics	
2021 (6th)	My Name Is Pauli Murray	Amazon Studios	
2021 (6th)	Procession	Netflix	
2021 (6th)	The Rescue	National Geographic Documentary Films	
2022 (7th)	Good Night Oppy (gold)	Amazon Studios	
2022 (7th)	Fire of Love (silver)	National Geographic Documentary Films and Neon	
2022 (7th)	Navalny (bronze)	HBO and CNN and Warner Bros. Pictures	
2022 (7th)	Aftershock	Hulu	
2022 (7th)	The Automat	A Slice of Pie Productions	
2022 (7th)	Descendant	Netflix	
2022 (7th)	Gabby Giffords Won't Back Down	Briarcliff Entertainment	
2022 (7th)	The Janes	HBO	
2022 (7th)	Moonage Daydream	HBO and Neon	
2022 (7th)	Sidney	Apple TV+	
2023 (8th)	Still: A Michael J. Fox Movie	Apple TV+	
2023 (8th)	20 Days in Mariupol	PBS	
2023 (8th)	American Symphony	Netflix	
2023 (8th)	Beyond Utopia	Roadside Attractions	
2023 (8th)	The Deepest Breath	Netflix	
2023 (8th)	The Eternal Memory	MTV Documentary Films	
2023 (8th)	Judy Blume Forever	Amazon Studios	
2023 (8th)	Kokomo City	Magnolia Pictures	
2023 (8th)	The Mission	National Geographic	
2023 (8th)	Stamped from the Beginning	Netflix	
2024 (9th)	Super/Man: The Christopher Reeve Story	Warner Bros. Pictures, DC Studios, HBO Documentary Films, CNN Films	
2024 (9th)	Will & Harper	Netflix	
2024 (9th)	Billy & Molly: An Otter Love Story	National Geographic	
2024 (9th)	Daughters	Netflix	
2024 (9th)	The Greatest Night in Pop	Netflix	
2024 (9th)	Jim Henson Idea Man	Disney+	
2024 (9th)	Music by John Williams	Disney+	
2024 (9th)	Piece by Piece	Focus Features	
2024 (9th)	The Remarkable Life of Ibelin	Netflix	
2024 (9th)	Sugarcane	National Geographic	
2025 (10th)	The Perfect Neighbor	Netflix	
2025 (10th)	2000 Meters to Andriivka	Frontline Features / The Associated Press	
2025 (10th)	The Alabama Solution	HBO Max	
2025 (10th)	Apocalypse in the Tropics	Netflix	
2025 (10th)	Cover-Up	Netflix	
2025 (10th)	Deaf President Now!	Apple TV+	
2025 (10th)	Orwell: 2+2=5	Neon	
2025 (10th)	Pee-wee as Himself	HBO Max	
2025 (10th)	Riefenstahl	Kino Lorber	
2025 (10th)	The Tale of Silyan	National Geographic	
2026 (11th)	You Can See Everything	A24	
2026 (11th)	14th	Netflix	
2026 (11th)	Everest: The Other Side	National Geographic Documentary Films	
2026 (11th)	Everybody to Kenmure Street	Icarus Films	
2026 (11th)	The History of Concrete	Magnolia Pictures	
2026 (11th)	Musk	Bleecker Street	
2026 (11th)	NAZA	The Guardian, mk2 films	
2026 (11th)	Once Upon a Time in Harlem	Neon	
2026 (11th)	Rehearsals for a Revolution	Sony Pictures Classics	
2026 (11th)	Remake	Music Box Films	

== See also ==
- Academy Award for Best Documentary Feature
- BAFTA Award for Best Documentary
- Independent Spirit Award for Best Documentary Feature
- Gotham Independent Film Award for Best Documentary
- International Documentary Association
- Cinema Eye Honors
