= Washington D.C. Area Film Critics Association Award for Best Documentary =

Annual award

The Washington D.C. Area Film Critics Association Award for Best Documentary is an annual award given by the Washington D.C. Area Film Critics Association.

== Winners and nominees ==
=== 2000s ===
Year	Documentary	Director(s)
2002	The Kid Stays in the Picture	Nanette Burstein and Brett Morgen
2002	Standing in the Shadows of Motown	Paul Justman
2003	The Fog of War	Errol Morris
2003	Amandla!: A Revolution in Four-Part Harmony	Lee Hirsch
2003	Capturing the Friedmans	Andrew Jarecki
2003	Step into Liquid	Dana Brown
2003	Tupac: Resurrection	Lauren Lazin
2004	Fahrenheit 9/11	Michael Moore
2005	Enron: The Smartest Guys in the Room	Alex Gibney
2005	Grizzly Man	Werner Herzog
2005	Mad Hot Ballroom	Marilyn Agrelo
2005	March of the Penguins	Luc Jacquet
2005	Murderball	Henry Alex Rubin and Dana Adam Shapiro
2006	An Inconvenient Truth	Davis Guggenheim
2007	Sicko	Michael Moore
2008	Man on Wire	James Marsh
2009	Food, Inc.	Robert Kenner
2009	Anvil! The Story of Anvil	Sacha Gervasi
2009	Capitalism: A Love Story	Michael Moore
2009	The Cove	Louie Psihoyos
2009	Good Hair	Jeff Stilson

=== 2010s ===
Year	Documentary	Director(s)
2010	Exit Through the Gift Shop	Banksy
2010	Inside Job	Charles Ferguson
2010	Restrepo	Tim Hetherington and Sebastian Junger
2010	The Tillman Story	Amir Bar-Lev
2010	Waiting for "Superman"	Davis Guggenheim
2011	Cave of Forgotten Dreams	Werner Herzog
2011	Being Elmo: A Puppeteer's Journey	Constance Marks
2011	Buck	Cindy Meehl
2011	Into the Abyss	Werner Herzog
2011	Project Nim	James Marsh
2012	Bully	Lee Hirsch
2012	The Imposter	Bart Layton
2012	The Invisible War	Kirby Dick
2012	The Queen of Versailles	Lauren Greenfield
2012	Searching for Sugar Man	Malik Bendjelloul
2013	Blackfish	Gabriela Cowperthwaite
2013	20 Feet from Stardom	Morgan Neville
2013	The Act of Killing	Joshua Oppenheimer
2013	Leviathan	Lucien Castaing-Taylor and Véréna Paravel
2013	Stories We Tell	Sarah Polley
2014	Life Itself	Steve James
2014	Citizenfour	Laura Poitras
2014	Jodorowsky's Dune	Frank Pavich
2014	Last Days in Vietnam	Rory Kennedy
2014	The Overnighters	Jesse Moss
2015	Amy	Asif Kapadia
2015	Best of Enemies	Robert Gordon and Morgan Neville
2015	Cartel Land	Matthew Heineman
2015	Going Clear: Scientology and the Prison of Belief	Alex Gibney
2015	The Look of Silence	Joshua Oppenheimer
2016	13th	Ava DuVernay
2016	Gleason	Clay Tweel
2016	I Am Not Your Negro	Raoul Peck
2016	O.J.: Made in America	Ezra Edelman
2016	Weiner	Josh Kriegman and Elyse Steinberg
2017	Jane	Brett Morgen
2017	City of Ghosts	Matthew Heineman
2017	Faces Places	Agnès Varda and JR
2017	An Inconvenient Sequel: Truth to Power	Bonni Cohen and Jon Shenk
2017	Step	Amanda Lipitz
2018	Won't You Be My Neighbor?	Morgan Neville
2018	Free Solo	Elizabeth Chai Vasarhelyi and Jimmy Chin
2018	RBG	Betsy West and Julie Cohen
2018	Science Fair	Cristina Costantini and Darren Foster
2018	Three Identical Strangers	Tim Wardle
2019	Apollo 11	Todd Douglas Miller
2019	American Factory	Steven Bognar and Julia Reichert
2019	For Sama	Waad Al-Kateab and Edward Watts
2019	Honeyland	Ljubomir Stefanov, Tamara Kotevska and Atanas Georgiev
2019	One Child Nation	Nanfu Wang and Jialing Zhang

=== 2020s ===
Year	Documentary	Director(s)
2020	Boys State	Jesse Moss and Amanda McBaine
2020	Collective	Alexander Nanau
2020	Crip Camp	Nicole Newnham and James LeBrecht
2020	Dick Johnson Is Dead	Kirsten Johnson
2020	Time	Garrett Bradley
2021	Summer of Soul	Questlove
2021	The First Wave	Matthew Heineman
2021	Flee	Jonas Poher Rasmussen
2021	The Rescue	Elizabeth Chai Vasarhelyi and Jimmy Chin
2021	Val	Leo Scott and Ting Poo
2022	Good Night Oppy	Ryan White
2022	All That Breathes	Shaunak Sen
2022	All the Beauty and the Bloodshed	Laura Poitras
2022	Descendant	Margaret Brown
2022	Fire of Love	Sara Dosa
2023	American Symphony	David Guggenheim
2023	20 Days in Mariupol	Mstyslav Chernov
2023	Little Richard: I Am Everything	Lisa Cortés
2023	Still: A Michael J. Fox Movie	Davis Guggenheim
2023	They Shot the Piano Player	Fernando Trueba and Javier Mariscal
2024	Super/Man: The Christopher Reeve Story	Ian Bonhôte and Peter Ettedgui
2024	Dahomey	Mati Diop
2024	Daughters	Natalie Rae and Angela Patton
2024	Music by John Williams	Laurent Bouzereau
2024	No Other Land	Basel Adra, Hamdan Ballal, Yuval Abraham, and Rachel Szor
2024	Will & Harper	Josh Greenbaum

== See also ==
- Academy Award for Best Documentary Feature
