= The Rescue (2021 film) =

2021 documentary film by Elizabeth Chai Vasarhelyi and Jimmy Chin

- Theatrical release poster
- Directed by: Elizabeth Chai Vasarhelyi; Jimmy Chin
- Produced by: Elizabeth Chai Vasarhelyi; Jimmy Chin; John Battsek; P. J. van Sandwijk; Bob Eisenhardt
- Cinematography: David Katznelson; Ian Seabrook
- Edited by: Bob Eisenhardt
- Music by: Daniel Pemberton
- Production companies: National Geographic Documentary Films; Ventureland; Storyteller Productions; Little Monster Films; Passion Pictures
- Distributed by: Greenwich Entertainment
- Release dates: September 2, 2021 (Telluride); October 8, 2021 (United States)
- Running time: 114 minutes
- Countries: United States; United Kingdom
- Language: English
- Box office: $1.2 million

The Rescue is a 2021 documentary film directed and produced by Elizabeth Chai Vasarhelyi and Jimmy Chin. It follows the Tham Luang cave rescue, a 2018 mission that saved a junior association football team from an underwater cave.

The film had its world premiere at the 48th Telluride Film Festival on September 2, 2021, and was theatrically released in the United States on October 8, 2021.

== Synopsis ==
The film follows the Tham Luang cave rescue.

== Production ==
In March 2019, it was announced Kevin Macdonald would direct a documentary film revolving around the Tham Luang cave rescue, with National Geographic Documentary Films set to produce. In February 2021, it was announced Elizabeth Chai Vasarhelyi and Jimmy Chin would replace Macdonald as director, though he would remain as executive producer on the project.

The filmmakers had difficulty securing rights to the story, with National Geographic able to secure the rights to the divers' story, while Netflix had acquired rights to the experiences of the soccer team, preventing them from telling their story in the film.

== Release ==
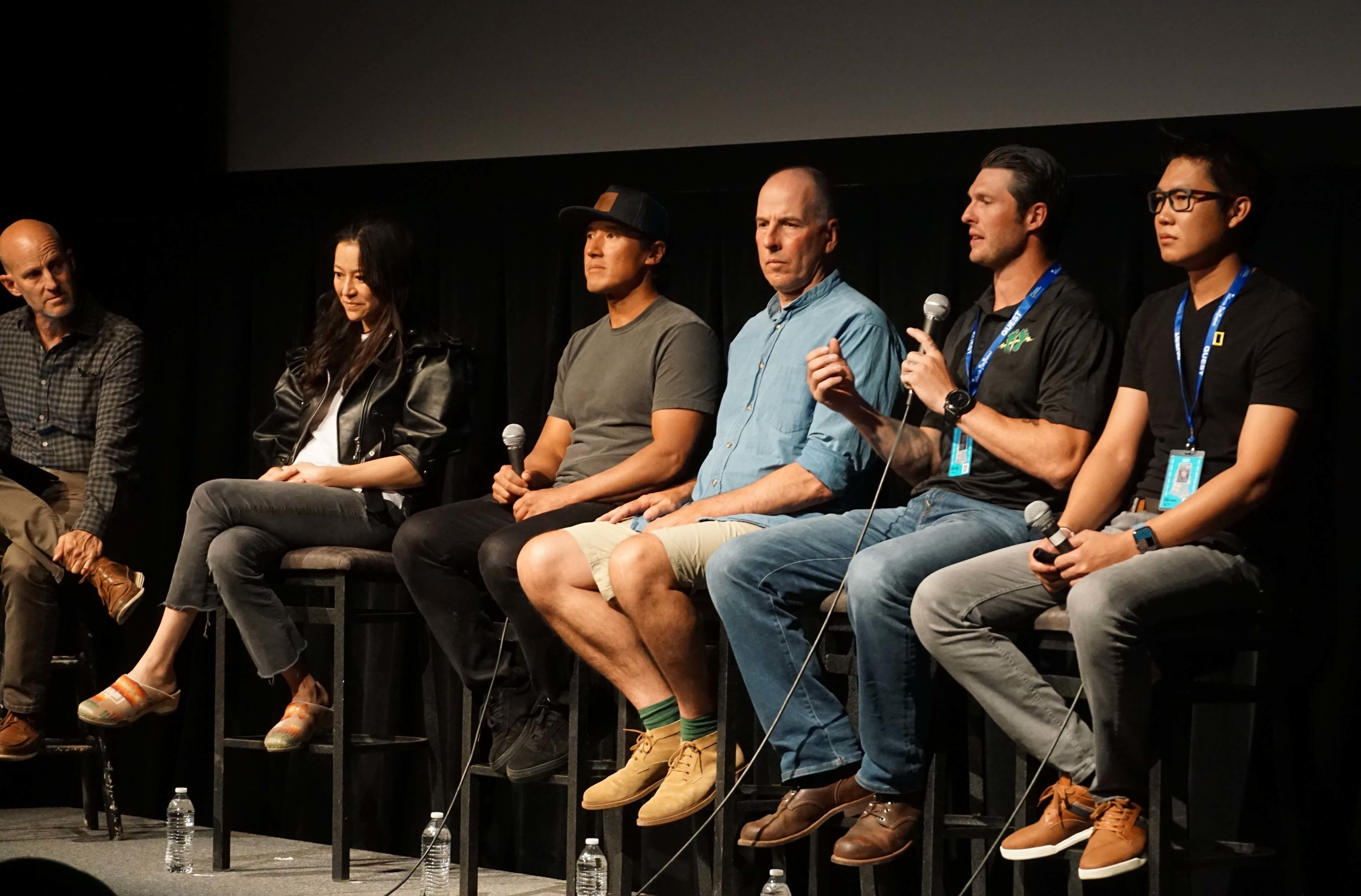
Panel discussion at the Telluride Film Festival. From left to right: interviewer, director Elizabeth Chai Vasarhelyi, director Jimmy Chin, diver Rick Stanton, Air Force Special Tactics Officer Capt. Mitch Torrel, groundwater expert Thanet Natisri

The film had its world premiere at the 48th Telluride Film Festival on September 2, 2021. It was also screened at the 2021 Toronto International Film Festival on September 12, 2021, where it won the People's Choice Award for Documentaries.

Greenwich Entertainment will distribute the film in the United States.

== Reception ==
=== Box office ===
In its opening weekend, the film made $69,662 from five theaters.

=== Critical response ===
According to review aggregator website Rotten Tomatoes, 96% of 91 critics have given the film a positive review, with an average rating of 8.5/10. Metacritic assigned the film a weighted average score of 86 out of 100 based on 18 critics, indicating "universal acclaim".

Michael O'Sullivan of The Washington Post gave the film 4/4 stars, writing: "As with Chin and Vasarhelyi's previous films, ignore any instinct you may have to pass up this movie because it sounds too hyper-specific: an activity you're not really that interested in, and a story whose ending you've already heard." Simran Hans of The Observer gave the film 4/5 stars, describing it as a "hugely involving documentary", and wrote: "Vasarhelyi and Chin recreate the sense of the clock running down as oxygen levels in the cave decrease, while the monsoon outside rages." Kevin Maher of The Times also gave the film 4/5 stars, writing: "the film-makers somehow manage to wring nerve-jangling tension from a foregone conclusion". John Lui of The Straits Times also gave the film 4/5 stars, writing: "By calmly describing everything that could go wrong while hauling 13 non-divers across 4 km of twisty, submerged passages, the experts evoke a sense of dread that would make a horror film-maker proud." Leslie Felperin of The Guardian gave the film 3/5 stars, writing: "Not only is the story compelling, but thanks to how much the event captured the interest of the world's media, there is a lot of archive footage to splice in among the generous wodges of talking-heads narration from the main participants." However, she criticized the music used towards the end of the film as "cheesy" and questioned why the rescued children were not interviewed.

Roxana Hadadi of RogerEbert.com was more critical of the film, giving it 2.5/4 stars. She wrote: "between Vasarhelyi and Chin's inability to speak with the boys or their families, and the documentary's initially languid pacing, "The Rescue" feels like half a story told fairly well, but still, half a story." Cassie Da Costa of Vanity Fair wrote that the film "plods along without taking any formal risks", adding: "I couldn't shake the feeling of watching a network TV documentary, designed to feed the audience with detail after detail, but not to generate any significant ideas from the facts and images it contains."

=== Awards and nominations ===
Award	Date of ceremony	Category	Recipient(s)	Result	Ref.
Toronto International Film Festival	September 18, 2021	People's Choice Award for Documentaries	The Rescue	Won	
Critics' Choice Documentary Awards	November 14, 2021	Best Documentary Feature	The Rescue	Nominated	
Critics' Choice Documentary Awards	November 14, 2021	Best Director	Elizabeth Chai Vasarhelyi and Jimmy Chin	Won	
Critics' Choice Documentary Awards	November 14, 2021	Best Score	Daniel Pemberton	Won	
Critics' Choice Documentary Awards	November 14, 2021	Best Cinematography	David Katznelson, Ian Seabrook and Picha Srisansanee	Won	
Critics' Choice Documentary Awards	November 14, 2021	Best Editing	Bob Eisenhardt	Nominated	
Hollywood Music in Media Awards	November 17, 2021	Best Original Score – Documentary	Daniel Pemberton	Nominated	
National Board of Review	December 3, 2021	Top Documentaries	The Rescue	Won	
Washington D.C. Area Film Critics Association Awards	December 6, 2021	Best Documentary	The Rescue	Nominated	
Dallas–Fort Worth Film Critics Association	December 20, 2021	Best Documentary Film	The Rescue	Runner-up	
San Francisco Bay Area Film Critics Circle	January 10, 2022	Best Documentary Feature	The Rescue	Nominated	
Austin Film Critics Association	January 11, 2022	Best Documentary	The Rescue	Nominated	
Seattle Film Critics Society	January 17, 2022	Best Documentary Feature	The Rescue	Nominated	
Houston Film Critics Society Awards	January 19, 2022	Best Documentary Feature	The Rescue	Nominated	
Online Film Critics Society Awards	January 24, 2022	Best Documentary	The Rescue	Nominated	
Cinema Eye Honors	March 1, 2022	Outstanding Non-Fiction Feature Feature	E. Chai Vasarhelyi, Jimmy Chin, P. J. van Sandwjik and John Battsek	Nominated	
Cinema Eye Honors	March 1, 2022	Outstanding Production	E. Chai Vasarhelyi, Jimmy Chin, P. J. van Sandwjik and John Battsek	Nominated	
Cinema Eye Honors	March 1, 2022	Outstanding Editing	Bob Eisenhardt	Nominated	
Cinema Eye Honors	March 1, 2022	Outstanding Cinematography	David Katznelson, Picha Srisansanee and Ian Seabrook	Nominated	
Cinema Eye Honors	March 1, 2022	Audience Choice Prize	E. Chai Vasarhelyi and Jimmy Chin	Won	
Cinema Eye Honors	March 1, 2022	The Unforgettables	Rick Stanton	Won	
Directors Guild of America Awards	March 12, 2022	Outstanding Directorial Achievement in Documentaries	Elizabeth Chai Vasarhelyi and Jimmy Chin	Nominated	
British Academy Film Awards	March 13, 2022	Best Documentary	Elizabeth Chai Vasarhelyi, Jimmy Chin, John Battsek, and P. J. Van Sandwijk	Nominated	
Golden Reel Awards	March 13, 2022	Outstanding Achievement in Sound Editing – Feature Documentary	Deborah Wallach, Roland Vajs, Nuno Bentro, Ben Smithers	Won	
Satellite Awards	April 2, 2022	Best Documentary Film	The Rescue	Nominated	
Producers Guild of America Awards	March 19, 2022	Outstanding Producer of Documentary Motion Pictures	The Rescue	Nominated	
News and Documentary Emmy Awards	September 29, 2022	Best Documentary	The Rescue	Nominated	
News and Documentary Emmy Awards	September 29, 2022	Outstanding Current Affairs Documentary	The Rescue	Won	
News and Documentary Emmy Awards	September 29, 2022	Outstanding Direction: Documentary	Elizabeth Chai Vasarhelyi and Jimmy Chin	Won	
News and Documentary Emmy Awards	September 29, 2022	Outstanding Research: Documentary	Santipong Changpuak, Susan Johnson, Chloe Mamelok, Thanet Natisri, Claudia Phaa Rowe	Won	
News and Documentary Emmy Awards	September 29, 2022	Outstanding Writing: Documentary	The Rescue	Nominated	

== See also ==
- The Cave (2019 Thai film), 2019 Thai action-drama film about these events.
- Thirteen Lives – 2022 film directed by Ron Howard
