= Flee (film) =

2021 animated documentary film by Jonas Poher Rasmussen

- Promotional release poster
- Danish: Flugt
- Directed by: Jonas Poher Rasmussen
- Screenplay by: Jonas Poher Rasmussen; Amin Nawabi
- Produced by: Monica Hellström; Signe Byrge Sørensen; Charlotte de la Gournerie
- Cinematography: Mauricio Gonzalez-Aranda
- Edited by: Janus Billeskov Jansen
- Music by: Uno Helmersson
- Production companies: Vice Studios; RYOT Films; Left Handed Films; Final Cut for Real; Sun Creature Studio; Arte; Danish Film Institute; Swedish Film Institute; SVT; Norwegian Film Institute; Creative Europe; Movistar Plus; CNC; Fritt Ord
- Distributed by: Neon & Participant (United States); Curzon Film (United Kingdom); Haut et Court (France); Mer Film (Norway); TriArt Film (Sweden); Reel Pictures (Denmark)
- Release dates: January 28, 2021 (Sundance); June 17, 2021 (Denmark); August 20, 2021 (Sweden); October 20, 2021 (Norway); December 3, 2021 (United States); February 11, 2022 (United Kingdom)
- Running time: 90 minutes
- Countries: Denmark; France; Norway; Sweden; United Kingdom; United States
- Languages: Danish; Dari; Russian; Swedish (newsreel); French (newsreel); English (newsreel)
- Budget: $3.4 million
- Box office: $2 million

Flee (Danish: Flugt) is a 2021 independent adult animated documentary film directed by Jonas Poher Rasmussen. An international co-production with Denmark, France, Norway, and Sweden, it follows the story of a man under the alias Amin Nawabi, Rasmussen's high school friend, who shares his hidden past of fleeing his home country of Afghanistan to Denmark for the first time. Riz Ahmed and Nikolaj Coster-Waldau serve as executive producers and serve as the English-language dub version voices for Nawabi and Rasmussen.

The world premiere of the film was at the 2021 Sundance Film Festival on January 28, 2021, where it won the Grand Jury Prize in the World Cinema Documentary section. It was released in theaters in the United States on December 3, 2021, by Neon and Participant.

The film received widespread acclaim from film festivals and critics, with critical praise for animation, story, thematic content, subject matter, and LGBT representation. It also incorporates archival film footage of events in Afghanistan from the time Amin fled. The film was frequently ranked one of the best films of 2021, and garnered numerous accolades, mainly for animated and documentary categories, including Best Feature Film at the Annecy International Animation Film Festival and Best Animated Feature – Independent at 49th Annie Awards, both making it the first animated documentary film to win.

The film was selected as the Danish entry for the Academy Award for Best International Feature Film, where it was selected as one of the five finalists and became the second foreign-language animated film after Waltz with Bashir (2008). The film was also nominated in the Best Documentary Feature and Best Animated Feature categories, becoming the first film ever to be nominated in all three of those categories.

== Plot ==
The film is presented in the form of an animated documentary; animated scenes depict Amin's past and present, interspersed with archival footage of the historical context.

Amin Nawabi is being interviewed in Denmark by director Jonas Poher Rasmussen, who has known Amin since they were teenagers. Jonas is making a documentary about Amin's life, including his escape from Afghanistan to Denmark as a refugee. Amin has not shared the full details of his story with anyone, including his boyfriend Kasper, whom he plans to marry. The trauma of his past affects Amin's ability to settle down, and he considers a position away from Kasper in the United States as a postdoctoral researcher at Princeton University.

Amin begins by sharing stories of his childhood in Kabul with his mother, Tahera, sisters Fahima and Sabia, and his older brother, Saif. Amin's father is not in their life, having been imprisoned as a perceived threat following the outbreak of the Soviet–Afghan War. Saif is forced to flee from police regularly to avoid being drafted to fight. After the Soviet Union withdraws from Afghanistan, the family flees Kabul due to the impending invasion by mujahideen forces. They fly to Russia, where they meet Amin's oldest brother Abbas, who is currently living in Sweden, having fled Afghanistan years earlier. Abbas arranges for human traffickers to smuggle the family to Sweden. While waiting to leave Russia, they are forced to stay indoors, as they are staying in the country illegally. Amin's sisters are the first to be smuggled, being placed on a freight container on a cargo ship with dozens of other refugees. The two survive but are traumatized due to the difficulty of the journey.

In the present, Jonas expresses surprise that Amin's siblings are still alive and living in Sweden, having previously thought Amin had no living family. Amin reveals that he keeps the truth hidden for fear he will be sent back to Afghanistan if it is revealed that he did not come to Denmark as an orphaned refugee as he claimed. Amin and Kasper tour a prospective house for them to live in after they are married; Kasper expresses concern about Amin's ability to stay in one place for an extended period. In the past, Amin, Saif, and Tahera flee Russia by truck with a group of fellow refugees. The group boards a boat that will bring them to Sweden across the Baltic Sea. The boat encounters bad weather during the trip, causing the engine to die. After several days adrift, they are discovered by a Norwegian cruise ship, whose crew contact the Estonian Border Guard to take custody of the passengers. Amin and his family are held captive in Estonia for six months before being deported back to Russia.

In the present, Amin decides to accept the position at Princeton, causing an argument between him and Kasper; he leaves and stays at Jonas's home. In the past, Tahera falls sick after their return to Russia. Saif takes responsibility for the family, deciding to send Amin out of Russia first using more expensive but more reliable smugglers, who tell him he must say he is an orphan to avoid being deported back to Afghanistan. Amin makes it to Ukraine but is sent on a flight to Copenhagen rather than Sweden. Once there, he turns himself over to the authorities as a refugee and makes contact with Abbas, who instructs him to continue to lie about his family members being killed. Several years later, Amin visits Abbas and his sisters in Stockholm. After admitting to them that he is gay, Abbas takes him to a gay club, telling him that the family always knew about his sexuality.

In the present, Jonas visits Amin in New York City, where he expresses a desire to settle down, having constantly been on guard throughout his life. He returns to Denmark, where he reunites with Kasper. Four months later, the two are married and have purchased a house together.

A textual epilogue reveals that Amin's brother and mother eventually escaped Russia while the fate of his father remains unknown.

== Voice cast ==
- Amin Nawabi as himself (present day)
  - Daniel Karimyar as Amin (9–11)
  - Fardin Mijdzadeh as Amin (15–18)
- Jonas Poher Rasmussen as himself
- Kasper (Amin's boyfriend) as himself
- Belal Faiz as Saif (13–19)
  - Milad Eskandari as Saif (8)
- Zahra Mehrwarz as Fahima (28)
  - Elaha Faiz as Fahima (13–26)
- Sadia Faiz as Sabia (16–26)

A number of the voice cast members are credited as anonymous, including the voice of Amin at ages 13–15, Abbas, Akthar Nawabi, Tahera, and young Tahera.

== Production ==
In January 2021, it was announced Riz Ahmed and Nikolaj Coster-Waldau would serve as executive producers on the film, and narrate an English-language dub version of the film.

=== Animation ===
The core animation team behind the film consisted of around ten animators and cleanup artists in Denmark, as well as a team of coloring artists in France. Each scene would go through a rough pass of animation where the team checked the acting of the characters and the intention. Once Poher Rasmussen approved it, the animators would tighten up the drawings in terms of the look of characters. The cleanup team would then check for the correct brushwork—meant to seem inky and sketchy as if from a graphic novel to give maturity to the line work—before finally shipping it off to the coloring team to embellish the characters. "It was a pretty big machinery", noted Ladekjær.

== Release ==
Flee had its world premiere at the Sundance Film Festival on January 28, 2021. Shortly after, Neon/Participant, Curzon Artificial Eye and Haut et Court acquired US, British, and French distribution rights, respectively. The film was initially set to have its world premiere at the Cannes Film Festival in May 2020, but the festival was cancelled due to the COVID-19 pandemic. It was also screened at the 2021 Toronto International Film Festival and the 2021 New York Film Festival in September 2021.

The film was released in select theaters for New York and Los Angeles by NEON and Participant on December 3, 2021 with a nationwide expansion on January 21, 2022. The film became available on Hulu on February 8, 2022.

== Reception ==
=== Box office ===
In its opening weekend, the film earned $24,794 from four theaters for a per-screen average of $6,198.

=== Critical response ===
Flee received widespread critical acclaim, with Sundance juror Kim Longinotto calling it "an instant classic" at the festival's awards ceremony. It holds a 98% approval rating on review aggregator website Rotten Tomatoes, based on 197 reviews, with an average rating of 8.5/10. The critics consensus reads, "Depicting the refugee experience through vivid animation, Flee pushes the boundaries of documentary filmmaking to present a moving memoir of self-discovery." On Metacritic, the film has a score of 91 out of 100 based on reviews from 33 critics, indicating "universal acclaim". It is also the sixth best-reviewed film of 2021 on the website, as well as the best-reviewed animated film of that year.

Metacritic reported that Flee appeared on over 33 film critics' top-ten lists for 2021, one of only two animated films to appear on the list for the year, alongside The Mitchells vs. the Machines. The film ranked first and second on two lists.

UK Film Review gave a 5-star rating. BBC listed as one of the twenty best films of 2021. Flee also ranked as the seventh best film of 2021 in an IndieWire poll of 187 critics and journalists.

== Accolades ==
At Sundance, Flee won the Grand Jury Prize in the World Cinema Documentary section. The film was subsequently screened at the Annecy International Animation Film Festival, where it won Best Feature Film. Flee also won The Cinema for Peace Award for The Most Valuable Documentary of the Year in 2022.

At the 2021 Toronto International Film Festival, the film was second runner-up for the People's Choice Award for Documentaries. It is also nominated for two Critics' Choice Documentary Awards, for Best Feature and Best Director.

The film won NBR Freedom of Expression and one of the top documentaries at National Board of Review, a nomination for Golden Globe Award for Best Animated Feature, earned two categories for British Academy Film Awards, won an Annie Award for the Best Animated Feature – Independent and four Dorian Awards.

Award	Date of ceremony	Category	Recipient(s)	Result	Ref.
Sundance Film Festival	February 3, 2021	World Cinema Documentary Competition	Flee	Won	
Annecy International Animation Film Festival	June 19, 2021	Best Feature	Flee	Won	
Annecy International Animation Film Festival	June 19, 2021	Gan Foundation Award for Distribution	Flee	Won	
Annecy International Animation Film Festival	June 19, 2021	Best Original Music for a Feature Film	Uno Helmersson	Won	
Millennium Docs Against Gravity	September 9, 2021	Grand Prix Bank Millennium Award	Flee	Won	
Toronto International Film Festival	September 18, 2021	People's Choice Award for Documentaries	Flee	Runner-up	
CLIT International Film Festival	October 17, 2021	Best Feature - Ativa-te! category	Flee	Won	
Out on Film	October 22, 2021	Best International Film - Audience Award	Flee	Won	
Montclair Film Festival	November 2, 2021	Audience Award for World Cinema	Flee	Won	
Montclair Film Festival	November 2, 2021	Bruce Sinofsky Prize for Documentary Feature	Jonas Poher Rasmussen	Won	
Newport Beach Film Festival	November 3, 2021	Best Animated Feature - Audience Award	Flee	Won	
Critics' Choice Documentary Awards	November 14, 2021	Best Documentary Feature	Flee	Nominated	
Critics' Choice Documentary Awards	November 14, 2021	Best Director	Jonas Poher Rasmussen	Nominated	
Manchester Animation Festival	November 25, 2021	Best Feature Film	Flee	Won	
Gotham Independent Film Awards	November 29, 2021	Best Documentary Feature	Flee	Won	
National Board of Review	December 3, 2021	Top Documentaries	Flee	Won	
National Board of Review	December 3, 2021	NBR Freedom of Expression	Flee	Won	
New York Film Critics Circle	December 3, 2021	Best Non-Fiction Film	Flee	Won	
Detroit Film Critics Society	December 6, 2021	Best Documentary	Flee	Won (Tied with "Summer of Soul")	
Detroit Film Critics Society	December 6, 2021	Best Animated Feature	Flee	Nominated	
British Independent Film Awards	December 5, 2021	Best International Independent Film	Jonas Poher Rasmussen, Amin Nawabi, Monica Hellstrøm, Signe Byrge Sørensen	Won	
Washington D.C. Area Film Critics Association Awards	December 6, 2021	Best Animated Feature	Flee	Nominated	
Washington D.C. Area Film Critics Association Awards	December 6, 2021	Best Documentary	Flee	Nominated	
European Film Awards	December 11, 2021	Best Documentary Film	Flee	Won	
European Film Awards	December 11, 2021	Best Animated Feature Film	Flee	Won	
European Film Awards	December 11, 2021	European University Film Award	Flee	Won	
New York Film Critics Online	December 12, 2021	Best Documentary	Flee	Won	
Boston Society of Film Critics Awards	December 12, 2021	Best Animated Film	Flee	Won	
Chicago Film Critics Association Awards	December 15, 2021	Best Animated Film	Flee	Won	
Chicago Film Critics Association Awards	December 15, 2021	Best Documentary Film	Flee	Nominated	
Los Angeles Film Critics Association Awards	December 18, 2021	Best Animated Film	Flee	Won	
Utah Film Critics Association	December 18, 2021	Best Animated Film	Flee	Won	
Utah Film Critics Association	December 18, 2021	Non-English Language Feature	Flee	Won	
Utah Film Critics Association	December 18, 2021	Best Documentary	Flee	Runner-up	
St. Louis Gateway Film Critics Association Awards	December 19, 2021	Best Animated Film	Flee	Nominated	
St. Louis Gateway Film Critics Association Awards	December 19, 2021	Best Documentary	Flee	Won	
St. Louis Gateway Film Critics Association Awards	December 19, 2021	Best Foreign Language Film	Flee	Nominated	
Indiana Film Journalists Association	December 20, 2021	Best Animated Film	Flee	Won	
Dallas–Fort Worth Film Critics Association	December 20, 2021	Best Foreign Language Film	Flee	Runner-up	
Dallas–Fort Worth Film Critics Association	December 20, 2021	Best Documentary Film	Flee	Runner-up	
Dallas–Fort Worth Film Critics Association	December 20, 2021	Russell Smith Award	Flee	Won	
Florida Film Critics Circle Awards	December 22, 2021	Best Documentary Film	Flee	Nominated	
Florida Film Critics Circle Awards	December 22, 2021	Best Animated Film	Flee	Runner-up	
Capri Hollywood International Film Festival	January 2, 2022	Best European Documentary	Flee	Won	
National Society of Film Critics	January 8, 2022	Best Non-Fiction Film	Flee	Won	
Golden Globe Awards	January 9, 2022	Best Animated Feature	Flee	Nominated	
San Diego Film Critics Society	January 10, 2021	Best Animated Film	Flee	Runner-up	
San Diego Film Critics Society	January 10, 2021	Best Documentary	Flee	Runner-up	
San Francisco Bay Area Film Critics Circle	January 10, 2022	Best Documentary Feature	Flee	Nominated	
San Francisco Bay Area Film Critics Circle	January 10, 2022	Best Animated Feature	Flee	Nominated	
San Francisco Bay Area Film Critics Circle	January 10, 2022	Best Foreign Language Film	Flee	Nominated	
Austin Film Critics Association	January 11, 2022	Best Animated Film	Flee	Nominated	
Austin Film Critics Association	January 11, 2022	Best Documentary	Flee	Nominated	
Georgia Film Critics Association	January 14, 2022	Best Picture	Flee	Nominated	
Georgia Film Critics Association	January 14, 2022	Best Animated Film	Flee	Nominated	
Georgia Film Critics Association	January 14, 2022	Best Documentary Film	Flee	Nominated	
Georgia Film Critics Association	January 14, 2022	Best Foreign Language Film	Flee	Nominated	
Toronto Film Critics Association	January 16, 2022	Best Animated Film	Flee	Won	
Toronto Film Critics Association	January 16, 2022	Best Documentary Film	Flee	Runner-up	
North Dakota Film Society	January 17, 2022	Best Picture	Flee	Nominated	
North Dakota Film Society	January 17, 2022	Best Animated Feature	Flee	Nominated	
North Dakota Film Society	January 17, 2022	Best Documentary Feature	Flee	Won	
North Dakota Film Society	January 17, 2022	Best International Feature	Flee	Won	
Denver Film Critics Society	January 17, 2022	Best Animated Film	Flee	Won	
Denver Film Critics Society	January 17, 2022	Non-English Language Feature	Flee	Nominated	
Denver Film Critics Society	January 17, 2022	Best Documentary	Flee	Nominated	
Seattle Film Critics Society	January 17, 2022	Best Animated Film	Flee	Won	
Seattle Film Critics Society	January 17, 2022	Non-English Language Feature	Flee	Nominated	
Seattle Film Critics Society	January 17, 2022	Best Documentary	Flee	Nominated	
Houston Film Critics Society Awards	January 19, 2022	Best Animated Feature Film	Flee	Nominated	
Houston Film Critics Society Awards	January 19, 2022	Best Documentary Feature	Flee	Nominated	
Houston Film Critics Society Awards	January 19, 2022	Best Foreign Language Film	Flee	Nominated	
Online Film Critics Society Awards	January 24, 2022	Best Documentary	Flee	Nominated	
Online Film Critics Society Awards	January 24, 2022	Best Animated Feature	Flee	Nominated	
Online Film Critics Society Awards	January 24, 2022	Best Film Not in the English Language	Flee	Nominated	
Alliance of Women Film Journalists Awards	January 25, 2022	Best Documentary	Flee	Won	
Alliance of Women Film Journalists Awards	January 25, 2022	Best Animated Film	Flee	Nominated	
Alliance of Women Film Journalists Awards	January 25, 2022	Best Non-English-Language Film	Flee	Nominated	
Robert Awards	February 5, 2022	Best Documentary Feature	Monica Hellström, Signe Byrge Sørensen, Charlotte de la Gournerie and Jonas Poher Rasmussen	Won	
Robert Awards	February 5, 2022	Best Editing	Janus Billeskov Jansen	Won	
Robert Awards	February 5, 2022	Best Sound Design	Edward Björner and Tormod Ringnes	Won	
Robert Awards	February 5, 2022	Best Score	Uno Helmersson	Won	
London Film Critics Circle Awards	February 6, 2022	Documentary of the Year	Flee	Nominated	
London Film Critics Circle Awards	February 6, 2022	Technical Achievement Award	Kenneth Ladekjær (animation)	Nominated	
Cinema Eye Honors	March 1, 2022	Outstanding Non-Fiction Feature Feature	Jonas Poher Rasmussen, Monica Hellström and Signe Byrge Sørensen	Won	
Cinema Eye Honors	March 1, 2022	Audience Choice Prize	Jonas Poher Rasmussen	Nominated	
Cinema Eye Honors	March 1, 2022	Outstanding Direction	Jonas Poher Rasmussen	Nominated	
Cinema Eye Honors	March 1, 2022	Outstanding Production	Monica Hellström and Signe Byrge Sørensen	Nominated	
Cinema Eye Honors	March 1, 2022	Outstanding Original Score	Uno Helmersson	Nominated	
Cinema Eye Honors	March 1, 2022	Outstanding Sound Design	Edward Björner and Tormod Ringnes	Nominated	
Cinema Eye Honors	March 1, 2022	Outstanding Graphic Design/Animation	Kenneth Ladekjær	Won	
Cinema Eye Honors	March 1, 2022	The Unforgettables	Amin	Won	
American Cinema Editors Awards	March 5, 2022	Best Edited Documentary – Feature	Janus Billeskov Jansen	Nominated	
Independent Spirit Awards	March 6, 2022	Best Documentary Feature	Flee	Nominated	
Annie Awards	March 12, 2022	Best Animated Feature – Independent	Flee	Won	
Annie Awards	March 12, 2022	Outstanding Achievement for Directing in an Animated Feature Production	Jonas Poher Rasmussen, Kenneth Ladekjær	Nominated	
Annie Awards	March 12, 2022	Outstanding Achievement for Editorial in an Animated Feature Production	Janus Billeskov Jansen	Nominated	
Annie Awards	March 12, 2022	Outstanding Achievement for Writing in an Animated Feature Production	Jonas Poher Rasmussen, Amin Nawabi	Nominated	
British Academy Film Awards	March 13, 2022	Best Animated Film	Flee	Nominated	
British Academy Film Awards	March 13, 2022	Best Documentary	Flee	Nominated	
Critics' Choice Awards	March 13, 2022	Best Animated Feature	Flee	Nominated	
Critics' Choice Awards	March 13, 2022	Best Foreign Language Film	Flee	Nominated	
Golden Reel Awards	March 13, 2022	Outstanding Achievement in Sound Editing – Feature Documentary	Edward Björner, Jens Johansson, Fredrik Jonsäter, Rune Van Deurs, Bengt Öberg	Nominated	
Dorian Awards	March 17, 2022	Best LGBTQ Film	Flee	Won	
Dorian Awards	March 17, 2022	Best Animated Film	Flee	Won	
Dorian Awards	March 17, 2022	Best Documentary	Flee	Won	
Dorian Awards	March 17, 2022	Best LGBTQ Documentary	Flee	Won	
Dorian Awards	March 17, 2022	Best Non-English Language Film	Flee	Nominated	
Producers Guild of America Awards	March 19, 2022	Outstanding Producer of Documentary Motion Pictures	Flee	Nominated	
Bodil Awards	March 19, 2022	Best Documentary	Flee	Won	
Bodil Awards	March 19, 2022	Bodil Special Award	Kenneth Ladekjær (animator) and Jess Nicholls (art director)	Won	
Academy Awards	March 27, 2022	Best Animated Feature	Jonas Poher Rasmussen, Monica Hellström, Signe Byrge Sørensen and Charlotte De La Gournerie	Nominated	
Academy Awards	March 27, 2022	Best Documentary Feature	Jonas Poher Rasmussen, Monica Hellström, Signe Byrge Sørensen and Charlotte De La Gournerie	Nominated	
Academy Awards	March 27, 2022	Best International Feature Film	Denmark	Nominated	
GLAAD Media Awards	April 2, 2022	Outstanding Documentary	Flee	Nominated	
Satellite Awards	April 2, 2022	Best Animated or Mixed Media Film	Flee	Nominated	
Satellite Awards	April 2, 2022	Best Documentary Film	Flee	Nominated	
Satellite Awards	April 2, 2022	Best Foreign Language Film	Flee	Nominated	
European Film Awards	December 10, 2022	Lux Award	Flee	Nominated	

== See also ==
- Persepolis, a 2007 animated biographical drama film
- Waltz with Bashir, a 2008 Israeli animated documentary
- The Breadwinner, a 2017 animated drama film
- List of submissions to the 94th Academy Awards for Best International Feature Film
- List of Danish submissions for the Academy Award for Best International Feature Film
