= A Crime on the Bayou =

- Theatrical release poster
- Directed by: Nancy Buirski
- Produced by: Nancy Buirski; Claire L. Chandler; Susan Margolin
- Cinematography: Rex Miller
- Edited by: Anthony Ripoli
- Production companies: Augusta Films; Get Lifted Film Company; Artemis Rising Foundation
- Distributed by: Shout! Studios
- Release dates: November 11, 2020 (DOC NYC); June 18, 2021 (United States)
- Running time: 89 minutes
- Country: United States
- Language: English

A Crime on the Bayou is a 2020 American documentary film, directed and produced by Nancy Buirski. It follows a young teenager challenging the most powerful white supremacist in 1960s Louisiana with the help of a young attorney. John Legend serves as an executive producer under his Get Lifted Film Company banner.

The film had its world premiere at DOC NYC on November 11, 2020. It was released on June 18, 2021, by Shout! Studios.

== Synopsis ==
The film follows Gary Duncan, a teenager from Louisiana, who gets arrested after trying to break up a fight between white and black teenagers. He seeks help from Richard Sobol who stands up to a legal system powered by white supremacy.

== Release ==
The film had its world premiere at DOC NYC on November 11, 2020. In April 2021, Shout! Studios acquired U.S. distribution rights to the film. It was released on June 18, 2021.

== Reception ==
A Crime on the Bayou received positive reviews from film critics. It holds a 100% approval rating on review aggregator website Rotten Tomatoes, based on 24 reviews, with an average of 8.1/10. On Metacritic, the film holds a rating of 81 out of 100, based on 6 critics, indicating "universal acclaim".

== See also ==
- Duncan v. Louisiana
