= The Crime of the Century (2021 film) =

American documentary film

- Official poster
- Written by: Alex Gibney
- Directed by: Alex Gibney
- Country of origin: United States
- Original language: English

Production
- Producers: Alex Gibney; Sarah Dowland; Tina Nguyen; Svetlana Zill
- Cinematography: Brett Wiley
- Editor: Andy Grieve
- Running time: 231 minutes
- Production companies: HBO Documentary Films; The Washington Post; Jigsaw Productions; Storied Media Group

Original release
- Release: May 10, 2021

The Crime of the Century is an American two-part documentary film directed, produced, and written by Alex Gibney. The film follows the opioid epidemic in the United States, and the political operatives, government regulations and corporations that enable the abuse of opioids, particularly the Sackler family and Purdue Pharma.

It was aired in two parts beginning on May 10, 2021, and May 11, 2021, by HBO. It received widespread praise from critics.

== Synopsis ==
=== OxyContin ===
The film follows the opioid epidemic in the United States, the political operatives, government regulations, and corporations that enable the abuse of opioids. Part one of the documentary focuses on Purdue Pharma and the Sackler family, who collaborated with Food and Drug Administration official Curtis Wright IV to get OxyContin approved for wider use. Government regulations tried to mitigate wrongdoing, leading Purdue and other distributors to settle cases, keeping details private. Patrick Radden Keefe, Andrew Kolodny, Mark Ross, Anna Lembke, Lynn Webster, Roy Bosley, Barry Meier, Art Van Zee (town physician), Paul Pelletier and Giles Sartin appear in part one.

The documentary commentators blame the manufacturers and marketers of opioids, while Purdue Pharma and the Sackler family blame opioid users for abuse of drugs.

=== Fentanyl ===
Part two of the documentary follows the mass marketing of Fentanyl. While the opioid crisis was killing over 40 people per day, Insys Therapeutics began to bribe doctors to overprescribe the drug, and a complex scheme to defraud insurance companies with fraudulent marketing tactics, and lawmakers who turned a blind eye to the crisis. Joe Rannazzisi (a retired DEA Agent), Jonathan Novak, Sari Horowitz, Scott Higham, Lenny Bernstein, David Lazarus, Nathaniel Yeager, Fred Wyshak, Ed Byrne, Will Kimbell, Alec Burlakoff, Sunrise Lee and Caleb Lainer appear in part two.

The DEA's Diversion Control Division ensures that opioid pharmaceutical drugs are not diverted to the black market. Fentanyl is designed to manage the "breakthrough pain" of cancer patients who are near death; the drug is supposed to alleviate their suffering before death.

According to Scott Higham and other commentators, there is an oligopoly of drug distributors: the three main companies are McKesson Corporation, Cardinal Health, and AmerisourceBergen. Former U.S. deputy AG Jamie Gorelick is accused of lobbying on behalf of the drug industry. Similarly, former DEA lawyer Linden Barber is said to have become a lobbyist on behalf of Cardinal Health. Donald Trump nominates Tom Marino to become the "drug czar" in 2017.

== Production ==
In February 2021, it was announced that Alex Gibney would direct and produce a two-part documentary film focusing on the opioid epidemic in the United States, with HBO Documentary Films and HBO set to distribute.

== Release ==
The film aired in two parts on May 10, 2021, and May 11, 2021, on HBO.

== Reception ==
It holds a 95% approval rating on review aggregator website Rotten Tomatoes, based on 22 reviews, with an average rating of 8.0/10. The site's critics' consensus reads: "Difficult, but necessary, The Crime of the Century interrogates the origins of the opioid crisis, raising big questions that will likely leave viewers wondering why something hasn't been done about this sooner." On Metacritic, the film holds a rating of 84 out of 100, based on seven critics, indicating "universal acclaim". It was both lauded and critiqued for focusing on those accused of causing the ongoing crisis more than on its victims.
