= Tony Lawrence =

Tony Lawrence may refer to:

- Tony Lawrence (soccer)
- Tony Lawrence (singer)

== See also ==
- Anthony Lawrence (disambiguation)
