= Across the board =

Across the board may refer to:

- a kind of parimutuel bet
- Across the Board, a television game show, 1959
- "Across the Board", a song by Jefferson Airplane from the album Baron von Tollbooth & the Chrome Nun, 1975
- Across the Board, an album by DJ Charlie B, 2022
- Across the Board on Tomorrow Morning, a play by William Saroyan, 1941
