= Joe Lauro =

American documentary filmmaker and musician

- Occupation: Documentary filmmaker
- Years active: 1999–present
- Known for: CEO of Historic Films Archive
- Notable work: The Big Beat: Fats Domino; The Howlin' Wolf Story – The Secret History of Rock & Roll (2003)

Joe Lauro is an American documentary filmmaker, musician, and stock footage archivist. He is known for being the founding CEO of the Historic Films Archive.

== Early life and education ==
Lauro was born in Brooklyn, New York. He received his MA in Cinema Studies at New York University.<refname=nyt/>

== Career ==
Lauro began working for Patrick Montgomerys' Archive Film Productions, a film archive service in New York after graduating. In 1991, Lauro founded Historic Films Archive, a stock footage library that contains over 40,000 hours of film and video which is derived from American Newsreels, Feature Films, Industrial shorts, home movies, out-takes, television programs and cartoons. Lauro turned to the filmmaking with a documentary film Louis Prima: The Wildest! in 1999. Lauro is known for his documentary films focused on American music themes. Apart from directing, he has also worked as a music consultant on films that required archival music, such as the Grateful Dead documentary Long Strange Trip (2017) and Martin Scorsese's 2005 documentary about Bob Dylan, No Direction Home, among others.

As of 2013 he is the CEO of Historic Films Archive, a commercial stock footage archive focusing on American music on film and video and rare American history and pop culture on film 1895–2000.

He has directed and produced documentary films such as The Big Beat: Fats Domino, The Birth of Rock 'n' Roll, and Rejoice and Shout.

In 2006, Lauro tracked down Hal Tulchin, the original producer of the video tape footage shot at the 1969 Harlem Cultural Festival which became the basis of the 2022 Academy Award winning documentary Summer of Soul (...Or, When the Revolution Could Not Be Televised). Lauro, with Tulchin's blessing, retrieved the original master tapes from Tulchin's Bronxville basement, restored and digitized them, as well as filed them for copyright registrations on behalf of Tulchin. Lauro's Historic Films Archive began licensing excerpts for the footage. In 2007 Lauro, with filmmakers Robert Gordon and Morgan Neville, began shopping around for a documentary film on the 1969 Harlem Cultural Festival, which Tulchin dubbed "The Black Woodstock". When negotiations with Newmarket Films broke down, its attorney Robert Fyvolent entered into an option deal with Tulchin that in 2021 resulted in Summer of Soul. Despite all the press at the time giving others credit for first discovering the Harlem Cultural Festival tapes, it was Lauro who actually brought the tapes and Harlem Cultural Festival event back to light.

Since 2021, he has hosted the American Grooves Radio Hour on Southampton New York's WLIW, Long Island's only NPR station, where he discusses and plays Jazz, Blues and Country 78 rpm recordings of the pre-1940 era from his extensive collection.

== Awards ==
- Louis Prima: The Wildest! - Audience Award at the East Hampton Film Festival 2000
- The Howlin' Wolf Story – The Secret History of Rock & Roll: Film Of The Year – National Blues Foundation (2003)
- Historic Films archive – Archive of the year (2017) at the Focal International

== Filmography ==
=== As producer ===
- 1999: Louis Prima: The Wildest!
- 1999: Somewhere Over the Rainbow: Harold Arlen
- 2003: The Howlin' Wolf Story
- 2008: The Four Tops: Reach Out – Definitive Performances 1965–1973
- 2009: The Supremes: Reflections – The Definitive Performances 1964 – 1969
- 2009: I'm Rick James: The Definitive DVD
- 2009: Motown: The DVD
- 2009: The Panic Is On: The Great American Depression as Seen by the Common Man
- 2010: Rejoice and Shout
- 2010: Louis Prima: In Person!
- 2016: American Masters

=== As director ===
- 2008: Sam & Dave: The Original Soul Men
- 2009: The Four Tops: Reach Out – Definitive Performances 1965–1973
- 2009: The Supremes: Reflections – The Definitive Performances 1964 – 1969
- 2009: I'm Rick James: The Definitive DVD
- 2009: The Panic Is On: The Great American Depression as Seen by the Common Man
- 2016: American Masters
- 2016: The Big Beat: Fats Domino and the Birth of Rock 'n' Roll
