= Hal Tulchin =

American film director (1926–2017)

- Born: Harold Monroe Tulchin; December 23, 1926; Elizabeth, New Jersey, US
- Died: August 29, 2017 (aged 90); New York City, US
- Occupation(s): Filmmaker, director

Harold Monroe Tulchin (December 23, 1926 – August 29, 2017) was an American television and video director.

== Life and career ==
Hal Tulchin was born in Elizabeth, New Jersey, the son of Jewish immigrants from Ukraine. He attended the University of Iowa, and then studied acting and directing at the Dramatic Workshop in Manhattan. He worked for Sterling Television, and for an advertising agency, Young & Rubicam, where he worked on Dwight D. Eisenhower's re-election campaign in 1956. He also directed live television commercials, and became an expert in the use of videotape. In 1959, he directed a television game show, Across the Board.

In 1969, Tony Lawrence, a nightclub singer who had been working under New York City Mayor John Lindsay to organize community initiatives and cultural events in Harlem, invited Tulchin to film the third Harlem Cultural Festival. For the festival, held at Mount Morris Park, Lawrence secured additional sponsorship from Maxwell House, and performers included Nina Simone, B. B. King, the Staple Singers, and Stevie Wonder. The event, taking place over several weekends, was filmed by Tulchin, and also involved the participation of community activists and civic leaders including Jesse Jackson. Tulchin used five portable video cameras to record over 40 hours of footage of the event, and reportedly also designed the stage set. Two hour-long specials were broadcast by CBS in July and September 1969, and the event became known as "Black Woodstock". The "Tony Lawrence Love Festival", held in Newark, New Jersey in October 1969, was also filmed by Tulchin and was broadcast by NBC the following month. Tulchin retained control over the videotapes of the Harlem concerts, but there was little interest in broadcasting longer excerpts of the footage more widely - according to Tulchin, "nobody really cared about black shows".

In the 1970s, Tulchin directed networked television shows featuring Bobby Goldsboro, Wayne Newton, and others. He also continued his attempts to interest broadcasters and film production companies in using footage of the Harlem festivals. Lawrence unsuccessfully disputed Tulchin's rights over the recordings. Some of the footage of Nina Simone was eventually used in documentaries about the singer, but most remained unused and in Tulchin's possession. In 2004, Tulchin agreed with film archivist Joe Lauro of Historic Films Archive that the videotapes be digitized, but negotiations with writer and film maker Robert Gordon and director Morgan Neville to make a feature film using the recordings later broke down.

Tulchin died, aged 90, in New York City in 2017.

Tulchin's video recordings of the 1969 Harlem Cultural Festival were eventually used by Ahmir "Questlove" Thompson as the basis for the successful 2021 documentary film Summer of Soul.
