= Anthony Lawrence =

Anthony or Tony Lawrence may refer to:

- Anthony Lawrence (basketball) (born 1996), American basketball player
- Anthony Lawrence (cricketer) (1911–1939), English cricketer
- Anthony Lawrence (journalist) (1912–2013), British journalist
- Anthony Lawrence (judge) (born 1965), American judge on the Mississippi Court of Appeals
- Anthony Lawrence (poet) (born 1957), Australian poet and novelist
- Tony Lawrence (soccer) (born 1946), Canadian soccer player
- Tony Lawrence (singer) (born 1936), Harlem singer of the 1960s
- Tony Lawrence, a character in The Young Philadelphians played by actor Paul Newman
