= Fifth Avenue =

North-south avenue in Manhattan, New York

- Museum Mile
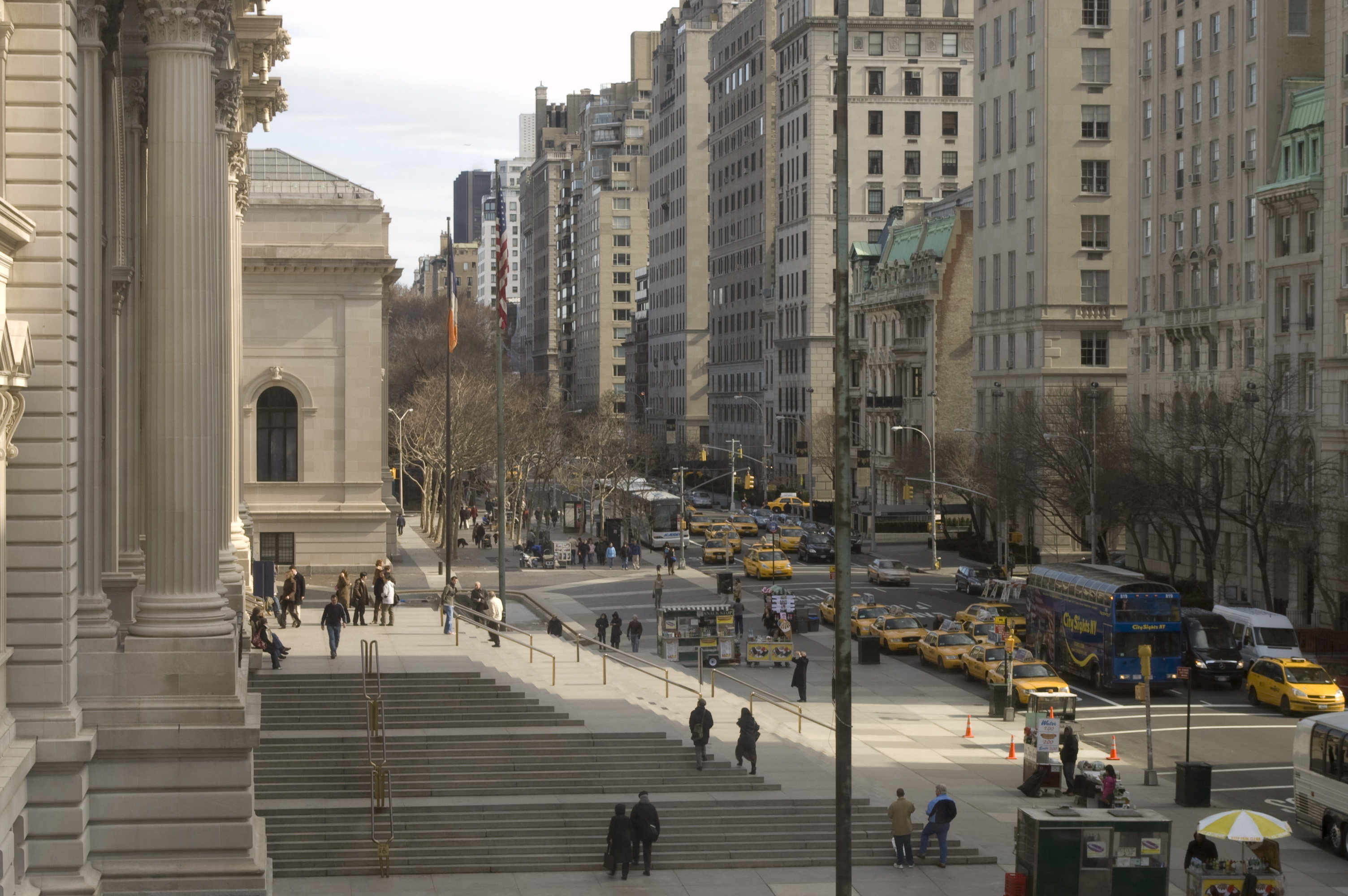
- Fifth Avenue spanning Museum Mile on the Upper East Side of Manhattan in March 2008
- Owner: City of New York
- Maintained by: NYCDOT
- Length: 6.197 mi (9.973 km)
- Location: Manhattan, New York City, United States
- South end: Washington Square North in Greenwich Village
- Major junctions: Madison Square in Flatiron; Grand Army Plaza in Midtown; Duke Ellington Circle in East Harlem; Marcus Garvey Park in Harlem; Madison Avenue Bridge in Harlem; Harlem River Drive in Harlem
- North end: Harlem River Drive / 143rd Street in Harlem
- East: University Place (south of 14th); Broadway (14th to 23rd); Madison Avenue (north of 23rd)
- West: Sixth Avenue (south of 59th); Central Park-East Drive (59th to 110th); Lenox Avenue (north of 110th)

Construction
- Commissioned: March 1811

Fifth Avenue is a major thoroughfare in the borough of Manhattan in New York City. The avenue runs south from West 143rd Street in Harlem to Washington Square Park in Greenwich Village. The section in Midtown Manhattan is one of the most expensive shopping streets in the world.

Fifth Avenue carries two-way traffic between 143rd and 135th Streets, and one-way traffic southbound for the rest of its route. The entire avenue carried two-way traffic until 1966. From 124th to 120th Streets, Fifth Avenue is interrupted by Marcus Garvey Park, with southbound traffic diverted around the park via Mount Morris Park West and northbound to Madison Avenue. Most of the avenue has a bus lane, but no bike lane. Fifth Avenue is the traditional route for many celebratory parades in New York City and is closed to automobile traffic on several Sundays each year.

Fifth Avenue was originally a narrower thoroughfare, but the section south of Central Park was widened in 1908. The Midtown blocks between 34th and 59th Streets were mostly residential until the early 20th century, when they were developed for commercial use. The section of Fifth Avenue in the 50s is consistently ranked among the most expensive shopping streets in the world. The stretch between 59th and 96th Streets along Central Park was once known as "Millionaire's Row" because of its high concentration of mansions. The portion between 82nd and 110th Streets, also along Central Park, is nicknamed Museum Mile for its many museums, including the Metropolitan Museum of Art, the Frick Collection, and the Guggenheim.

== History ==
=== Early history ===
Fifth Avenue between 42nd Street and Central Park South (59th Street) was relatively undeveloped through the late 19th century. The surrounding area was once part of the common lands of the city of New York, which was allocated "all the waste, vacant, unpatented, and unappropriated lands" as a result of the 1686 Dongan Charter. The city's Common Council came to own a large amount of land, primarily in the middle of the island away from the Hudson and East Rivers, as a result of grants by the Dutch provincial government to the colony of New Amsterdam. Although originally more extensive, by 1785 the council held approximately 1,300 acres (530 ha), or about 9 percent of the island.

The lots along what is now Fifth Avenue were laid out in the late 18th century following the American Revolutionary War. The city's Common Council had, starting in June 1785, attempted to raise money by selling property. The land that the Council owned was not suitable for farming or residential estates, and it was also far away from any roads or waterways. To divide the common lands into sellable lots, and to lay out roads to service them, the Council hired Casimir Goerck to survey them. Goerck was instructed to make lots of about 5 acres (2.0 ha) each and to lay out roads to access the lots. He completed his task in December 1785, creating 140 lots of varying sizes, oriented with the east–west axis longer than the north–south axis. As part of the plan, Goerck drew up a street called Middle Road, which eventually became Fifth Avenue.

The topography of the lots contributed to the public's reluctance to buy the lots. By 1794, with the city growing ever more populated and the inhabited area constantly moving north towards the Common Lands, the Council decided to try again, hiring Goerck once more to re-survey and map the area. He was instructed to make the lots more uniform and rectangular and to lay out roads to the west and east of Middle Road, as well as to lay out east–west streets of 60 feet (18 m) each. Goerck's East and West Roads later became Fourth and Sixth Avenues, while Goerck's cross streets became the modern-day numbered east–west streets. Goerck took two years to survey the 212 lots which encompassed the entire Common Lands. The Commissioners' Plan of 1811, which prescribed the street plan for Manhattan, was heavily inspired from Goerck's two surveys.

=== 19th century ===
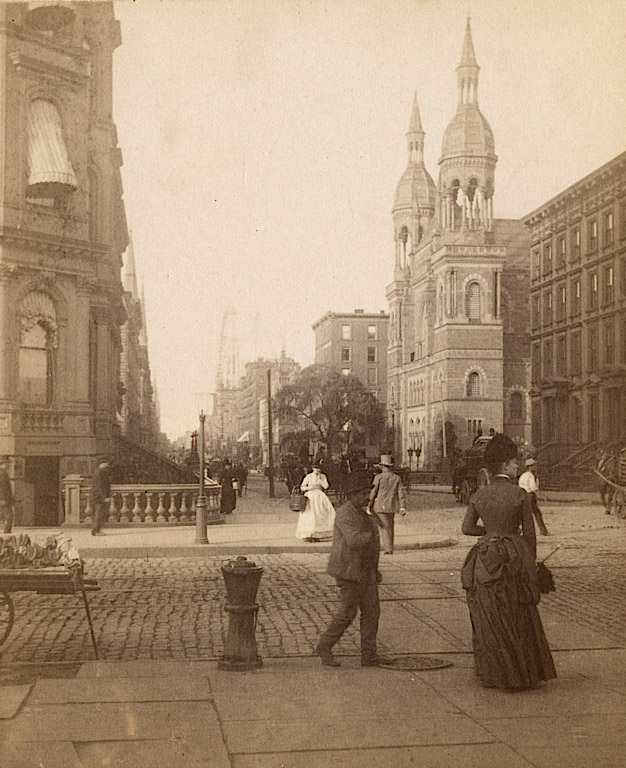
Robert L. Bracklow (1849–1919), from his Glimpses through the Camera series

From the early 19th century, some plots on Fifth Avenue in Midtown were acquired by the wealthy and by institutions. In the mid-19th century, Fifth Avenue between 40th and 59th Streets was home to several institutions such as the Colored Orphan Asylum, the Deaf and Dumb Asylum, the Roman Catholic Orphan Asylum, and St. Luke's Hospital. Other uses such as a cattle farm remained until the 1860s. One of the first large houses to be built on Fifth Avenue was Henry J. Brevoort's three-story residence at Ninth Street, which was completed in 1834. Subsequently, other farm owners decided to build houses along Fifth Avenue and its cross-streets.

The portion of Fifth Avenue in Midtown became an upscale residential area following the American Civil War. Among the first people to develop such structures was Mary Mason Jones, who built the "Marble Row" on the eastern side of Fifth Avenue from 57th to 58th Streets between 1868 and 1870. Her sister Rebecca Colford Jones erected ornate houses of her own one block south. Further development came in the late 1870s with the construction of three Vanderbilt family residences along Fifth Avenue between 51st and 59th Streets (the William H., William K., and Cornelius II mansions). In the 1880s and 1890s, the ten blocks of Fifth Avenue south of Central Park (at 59th Street) were known as "Vanderbilt Row".

The Vanderbilts' relocation prompted many business owners on Fifth Avenue between Madison Square and 34th Street to move uptown. The upper section of Fifth Avenue on the Upper East Side, facing the newly created Central Park, was not developed at that time because of what the Real Estate Record and Guide described as the presence of "no opposite neighbors", as the Upper West Side was not yet developed. Wealthy New Yorkers were buying land between 50th and 80th Streets and developing houses there in the 1880s. By 1915, the mansions on Fifth Avenue stretched all the way to 96th Street.

=== Early 20th century ===
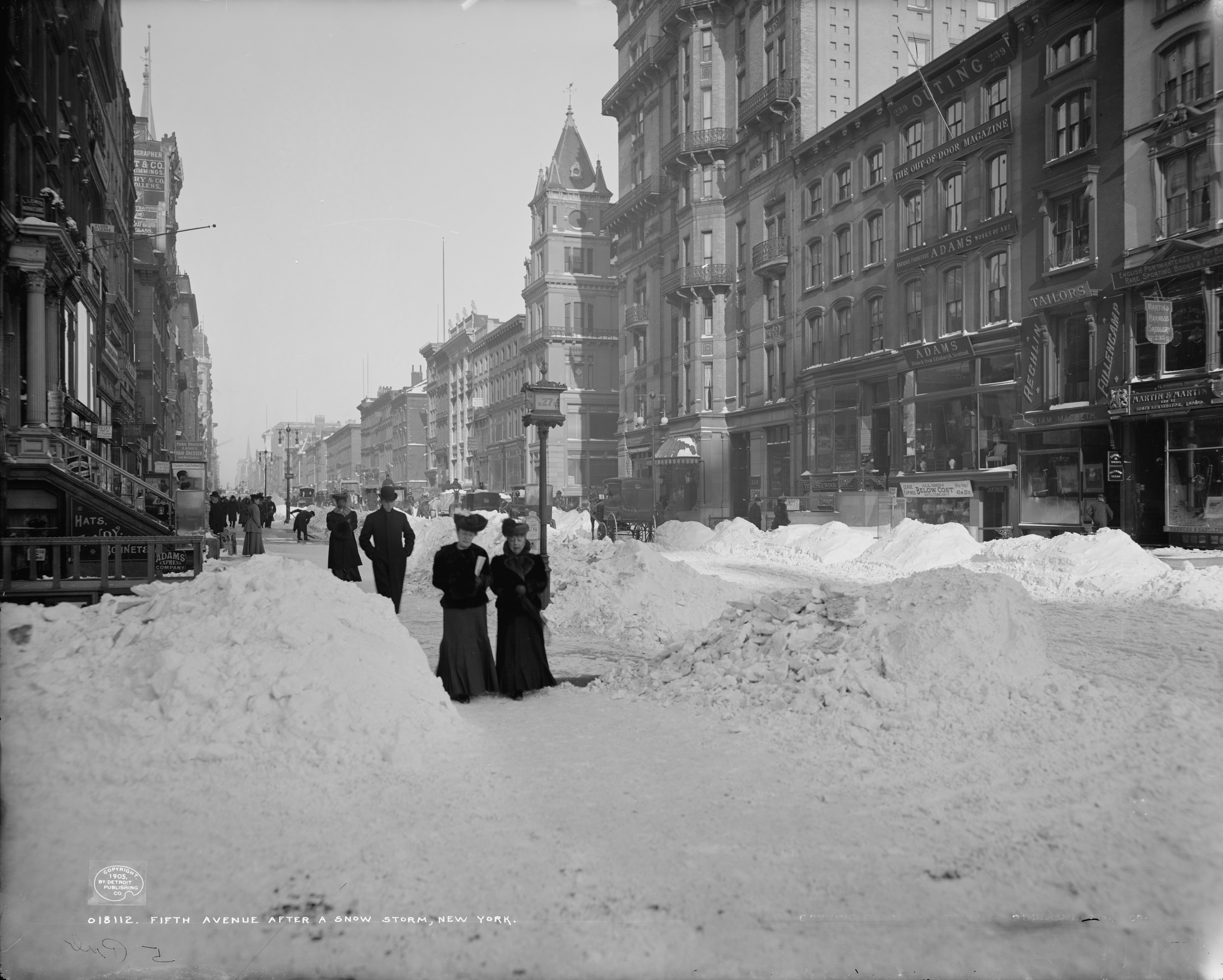
Fifth Avenue after a snow storm in 1905

Midtown Fifth Avenue remained primarily residential until the early 20th century, when commercial development intensified. Rising traffic by 1900 led to proposals to limit vehicle access.

In 1908, the section south of Central Park was widened to accommodate growing traffic. This involved removing stoops and other sidewalk encroachments, including those at the Waldorf–Astoria Hotel. By early 1911, widening had reached south of 47th Street, and later that year, the stretch between 47th and 59th Streets underwent similar changes. Many mansions were truncated or demolished, while the facades of St. Patrick's Cathedral and Fifth Avenue Presbyterian Church were shifted back. Gardens at the St. Regis and Gotham hotels were also removed.

The first commercial building on Fifth Avenue was developed by Benjamin Altman, who acquired the northeast corner of 34th Street in 1896. The resulting B. Altman and Company Building, completed between 1906 and 1914, spanned the entire block front. This helped establish a high-end shopping district catering to fashionable clientele. In 1914, the Lord & Taylor Building was constructed at Fifth Avenue and 38th Street, followed by the Saks Fifth Avenue Building between 49th and 50th Streets in 1924, and the Bergdorf Goodman Building between 57th and 58th Streets in 1928–29.

By the 1920s, Fifth Avenue was the most active development corridor in Midtown. Developers expanded north of 45th Street, previously seen as the limit for viable construction. In 1926 alone, thirty office buildings rose on Fifth Avenue. The two-block-wide area between Fifth and Park Avenues, just 8% of Manhattan's land, accounted for 25% of all developments initiated between 1924 and 1926. On the Upper East Side, many Fifth Avenue mansions were replaced by luxury apartment buildings, as upkeep became too costly for private owners.

Traffic control innovations also emerged in this period. Patrolmen were first deployed in 1914 to direct vehicles at key intersections. The first traffic towers were installed in 1920 as a gift from Dr. John A. Harriss at key junctions such as 34th, 38th, and 42nd Streets. In 1922, the Fifth Avenue Association funded seven 23-foot-high (7.0 m) bronze towers designed by Joseph H. Freedlander, spanning from 14th to 57th Streets. These towers cut travel time between 34th and 57th Streets from 40 minutes to 15.

Freedlander's towers were removed in 1929. They were replaced by corner-mounted bronze signals topped with statues of Mercury, which remained in place until 1964; and several statues were restored in 1971.

Fifth Avenue about 1905

=== Mid- and late 20th century ===
In 1954, rising traffic led to a proposal to limit use of the avenue to buses and taxis only. On January 14, 1966, Fifth Avenue below 135th Street was changed to carry only one-way traffic southbound, and Madison Avenue was changed to one-way northbound. Both avenues had previously carried bidirectional traffic.

Through the late 1960s and early 1970s, many of the upscale retailers that once lined Fifth Avenue's midtown section moved away or closed altogether. According to a 1971 survey of the avenue, conducted by the Office of Midtown Planning under the leadership of Jaquelin T. Robertson, only 57 percent of building frontages between 34th and 57th Street were used as stores. The remaining frontage, including was used for companies such as banks and airline ticket offices. The section between 34th and 42nd Street, once the main shopping district on Fifth Avenue, was identified in the survey as being in decline. The section between 42nd and 50th Street was characterized as having almost no ground-level retail. The section between 50th Street and Grand Army Plaza was identified as having a robust retail corridor that was starting to decay.

In February 1971, New York City mayor John Lindsay proposed a special zoning district to preserve the retail character of Fifth Avenue's midtown section. The legislation prescribed a minimum percentage of retail space for new buildings on Fifth Avenue, but it also provided "bonuses", such as additional floor area, for buildings that had more than the minimum amount of retail. The legislation also encouraged the construction of several mixed-use buildings with retail at the lowest stories, offices at the middle stories, and apartments at the top stories. The types of retail included in this legislation were strictly defined; for example, airline ticket offices and banks did not count toward the retail space. Furthermore, new skyscrapers on the eastern side of the avenue were allowed to be built up to the boundary of the sidewalk. To align with the buildings of Rockefeller Center, new buildings on the western side had to contain a setback at least 50 feet (15 m) deep at a height of 85 feet (26 m) or lower. The New York City Planning Commission approved this legislation in March 1971. The legislation was adopted that April. Just before the legislation was enacted, American Airlines leased a ground-level storefront on the corner of Fifth Avenue and 53rd Street; Robertson initially disputed the move, even though it had been finalized before the legislation was proposed. As part of an experiment in 1970, Lindsay closed Fifth Avenue between 42nd and 57th Street to vehicular traffic for seven hours on Saturdays.

In 1997, a midblock crosswalk was installed south of the intersection of Fifth Avenue and 50th Street, part of an experiment to allow vehicular traffic to turn without conflicting with pedestrians. The former southern crosswalk at Fifth Avenue and 50th Street was fenced off; the relocated crosswalk was one of a few midblock crosswalks in the city. A similar crosswalk was later installed south of 49th Street. Both of the recessed crosswalks were removed in 2018.

=== 21st century ===
In June 2020, mayor Bill de Blasio announced that the city would test out busways on Fifth Avenue from 57th to 34th Street, banning through traffic from private vehicles. Despite an October 2020 deadline, the Fifth Avenue busway was not in place at that time. Due to opposition from local business owners, the busway was ultimately downsized.

In December 2022, Mayor Eric Adams proposed rebuilding the midtown section of Fifth Avenue, and the NYCDOT temporarily closed Fifth Avenue between 48th and 57th Streets to all vehicular traffic for three weekends. Excluding special events such as parades, this was the first time since the 1970s that the midtown section of Fifth Avenue was closed to vehicular traffic. In October 2024, Adams and the Future of Fifth Partnership proposed redesigning Fifth Avenue between 60th and 40th Streets. The proposal would cost $230 million and would include widening sidewalks from 23 to 33.5 feet (7.0 to 10.2 m); removing two of the five traffic lanes; and adding benches, planters, and 230 trees. The plans did not include a bike lane for the avenue, as previous proposals had entailed; instead, an existing bike lane on Sixth Avenue would be widened for two-way bike traffic. If the plans received final approval, the avenue could be rebuilt starting in 2028. Adams announced in December 2024 that the city government would spend at least $150 million rebuilding Fifth Avenue in midtown. As of 2025, the project was expected to begin in 2028 and cost about $400 million.

== Description ==
Fifth Avenue originates at Washington Square Park in Greenwich Village and runs northwards through the heart of Midtown, along the eastern side of Central Park, where it forms the boundary of the Upper East Side and through Harlem, where it terminates at the Harlem River at 142nd Street. Traffic crosses the river on the Madison Avenue Bridge.

Fifth Avenue serves as the dividing line for house numbering and west–east streets in Manhattan; for example, it separates East 59th Street from West 59th Street. Higher-numbered avenues such as Sixth Avenue are to the west of Fifth Avenue, while lower-numbered avenues such as Third Avenue are to the east. Address numbers on west–east streets increase in both directions as one moves away from Fifth Avenue. A hundred street address numbers were provided for every block to the east or west of Fifth Avenue; for instance, the addresses on West 50th Street between Fifth and Sixth Avenues were numbered 1–99 West 50th Street, and between Sixth and Seventh Avenues 100–199 West 50th Street. The building lot numbering system worked similarly on the East Side before Madison and Lexington Avenues were added to the street grid laid out in the Commissioners' Plan of 1811. Unlike at other avenues, west–east street addresses do not increment to the next hundred to the east of Madison and Lexington Avenues.

The "most expensive street in the world" moniker changes depending on currency fluctuations and local economic conditions from year to year. For several years starting in the mid-1990s, the shopping district between 49th and 57th Streets was ranked as having the world's most expensive retail spaces on a cost per square foot basis. In 2008, Forbes magazine ranked Fifth Avenue as being the most expensive street in the world. Some of the most coveted real estate on Fifth Avenue are the penthouses perched atop the buildings.

The American Planning Association (APA) compiled a list of "2012 Great Places in America" and declared Fifth Avenue to be one of the greatest streets to visit in America. This historic street has many world-renowned museums, businesses and stores, parks, luxury apartments, and historical landmarks that are reminiscent of its history and vision for the future.

=== Traffic pattern ===
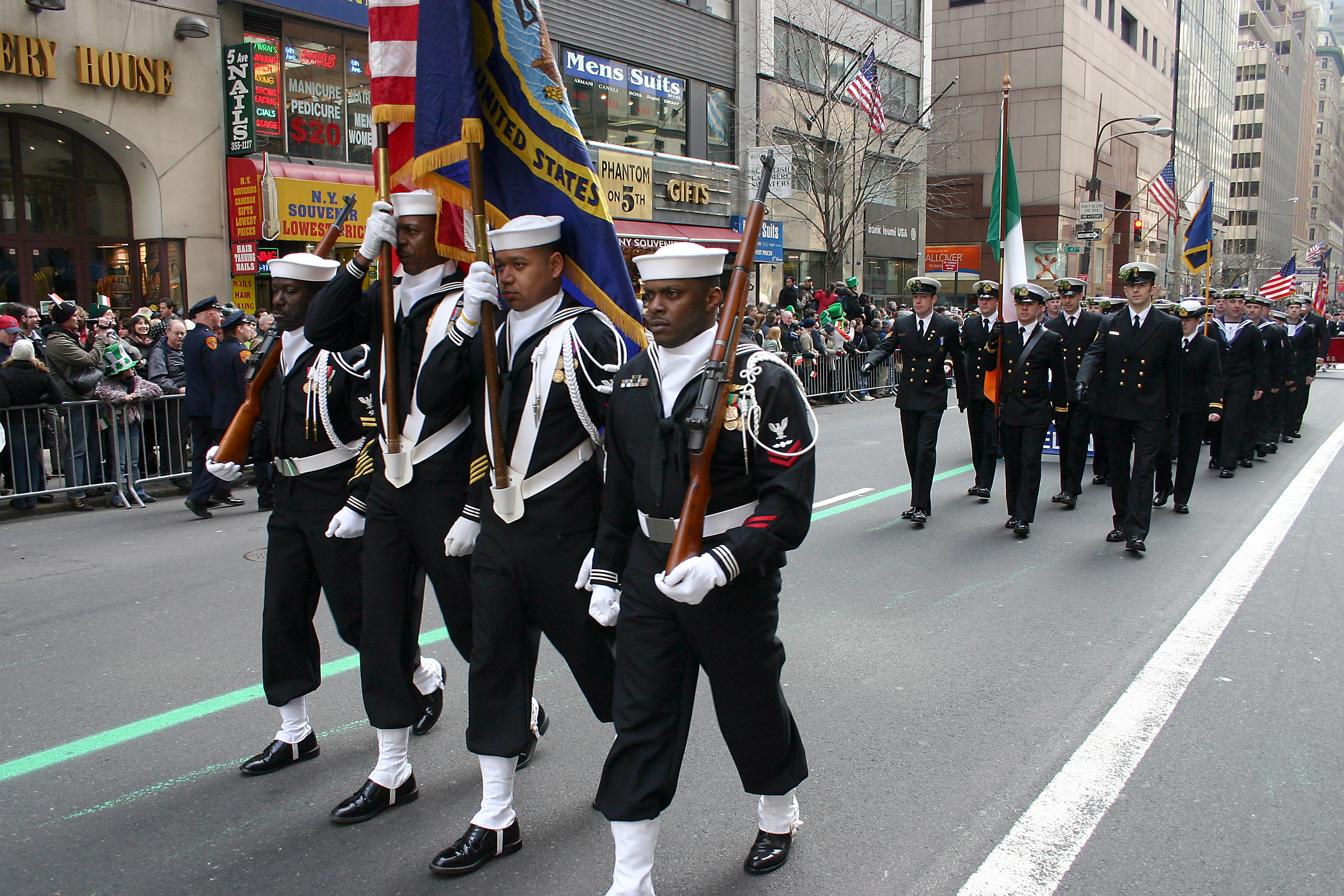
Members of Naval Reserve Center Bronx's color guard march up Fifth Avenue at the 244th Annual NYC St. Patrick's Day parade.

Fifth Avenue from 142nd Street to 135th Street carries two-way traffic. Fifth Avenue carries one-way traffic southbound from 143rd Street to 142nd Street and from 135th Street to Washington Square North. The changeover to one-way traffic south of 135th Street took place on January 14, 1966, at which time Madison Avenue was changed to one way uptown (northbound). From 124th Street to 120th Street, Fifth Avenue is cut off by Marcus Garvey Park, with southbound traffic diverted around the park via Mount Morris Park West.

==== Parade route ====
Fifth Avenue is the traditional route for many celebratory parades in New York City; thus, it is closed to traffic on numerous Sundays in warm weather. The longest running parade is the annual St. Patrick's Day Parade. Parades held are distinct from the ticker-tape parades held on the "Canyon of Heroes" on lower Broadway, and the Macy's Thanksgiving Day Parade held on Broadway from the Upper West Side downtown to Herald Square. Fifth Avenue parades usually proceed from south to north, with the exception of the LGBT Pride March, which goes north to south to end in Greenwich Village. The Latino literary classic by New Yorker Giannina Braschi, entitled "Empire of Dreams", takes place on the Puerto Rican Day Parade on Fifth Avenue.

==== Bicycling route ====
Bicycling on Fifth Avenue ranges from segregated with a bike lane south of 23rd Street, to scenic along Central Park, to dangerous through Midtown with very heavy traffic during rush hours. There is no dedicated bike lane along most of Fifth Avenue. A protected bike lane south of 23rd Street was added in 2017, and another protected lane for bidirectional bike traffic between 110th and 120th Streets was announced in 2020.

In July 1987, New York City Mayor Ed Koch proposed banning bicycling on Fifth, Park, and Madison Avenues during weekdays, but many bicyclists protested and had the ban overturned. When the trial was started on August 24, 1987, for 90 days to ban bicyclists from these three avenues from 31st Street to 59th Street between 10 a.m. and 4 p.m. on weekdays, mopeds would not be banned. On August 31, 1987, a state appeals court judge halted the ban for at least a week pending a ruling after opponents against the ban brought a lawsuit. A bike lane on Fifth Avenue between 59th and 42nd Streets was proposed in late 2022.

=== Public transportation ===
==== Bus ====
Fifth Avenue is one of the few major streets in Manhattan along which streetcars did not operate. Instead, transportation along Fifth Avenue was initially provided by the Fifth Avenue Transportation Company, which provided horse-drawn service from 1885 to 1896. It was replaced by Fifth Avenue Coach, which continued to offer bus service. Double-decker buses were operated by the Fifth Avenue Coach Company until 1953 and again by MTA Regional Bus Operations from 1976 to 1978.

A bus lane for Fifth Avenue within Midtown was announced in 1982. Initially it ran from 59th to 34th Streets. The bus lane opened in June 1983 and was restricted to buses on weekdays from 7 a.m. to 7 p.m. Today, local bus service along Fifth Avenue is provided by the following routes downtown. Uptown service runs on the parallel Madison Avenue unless specified below. All crosstown service is westbound:

- The M1, M2 and M3 buses run from the Duke Ellington Circle to East 8th Street. M1 service originates at West 139th Street, runs in both directions north of West 135th Street, and uses Mount Morris Park West to get around Marcus Garvey Park.
- The M4 and Q32 run to East 32nd Street in Midtown from West 110th and East 60th Streets, respectively.
- The M5 runs from West 59th to West 31st Streets and the M55 from West 44th to East 8th Streets. Uptown buses use 6th Avenue.
- The M106 runs from East 106th Street to the 97th Street Transverse.
- The M86 SBS runs from East 86th to East 85th Streets.
- The M66 and M72 run to East 66th Street from East 72nd and East 67th Streets, respectively.

Numerous express buses from Brooklyn, the Bronx, and Staten Island also run along Fifth Avenue.

==== Subway ====
The New York City Subway has never built a line underneath Fifth Avenue, likely because wealthy Fifth Avenue residents would have objected to any such line. However, there are several subway stations along streets that cross Fifth Avenue:

- N, R, and W at Fifth Avenue–59th Street
- E, F, and <F> at Fifth Avenue/53rd Street
- 7 and <7> at Fifth Avenue and 42nd Street
- R and W at Fifth Avenue and 23rd Street

== Nicknames ==
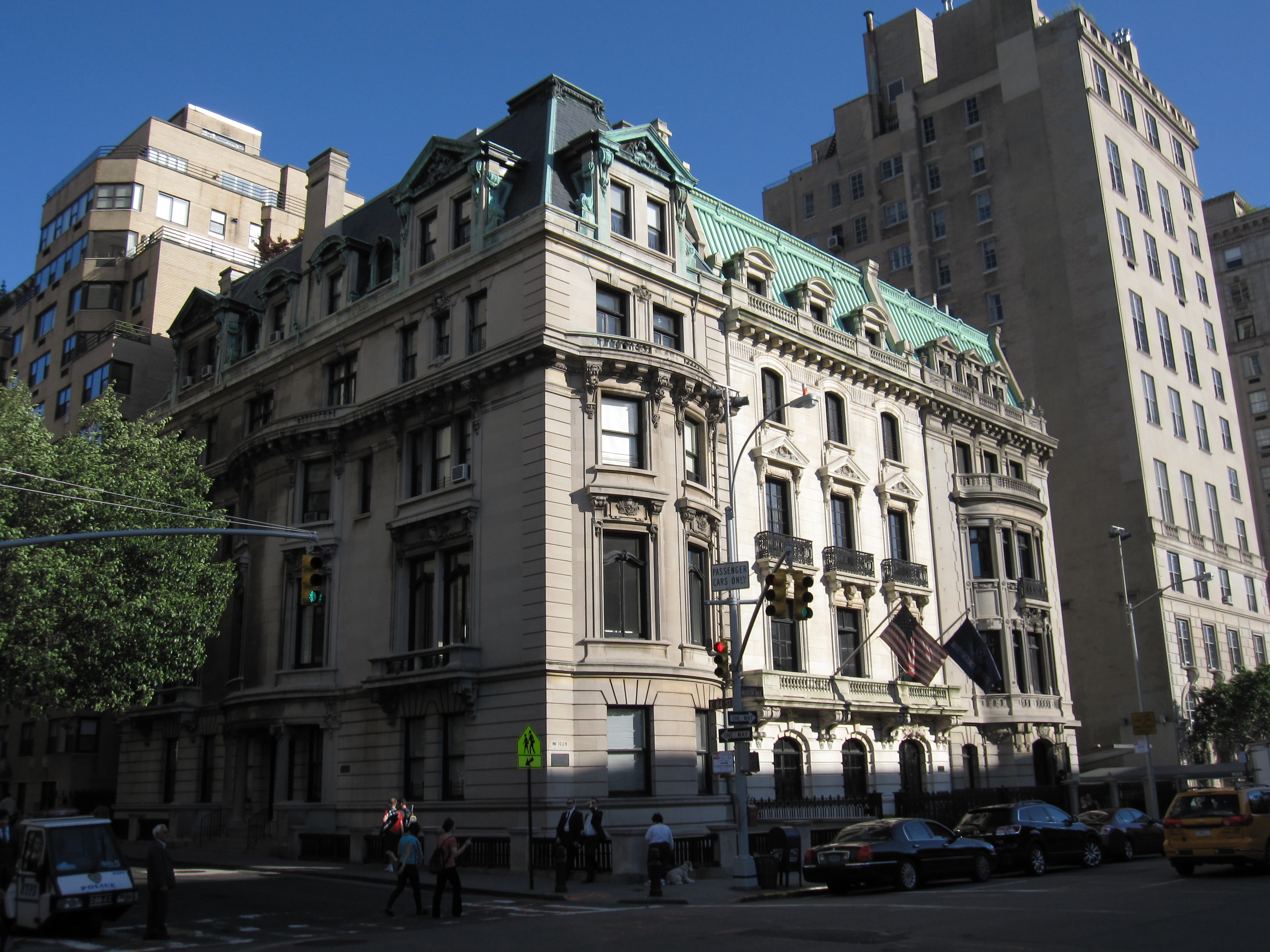
1026–1028 Fifth Avenue, one of the few extant mansions on Millionaire's Row

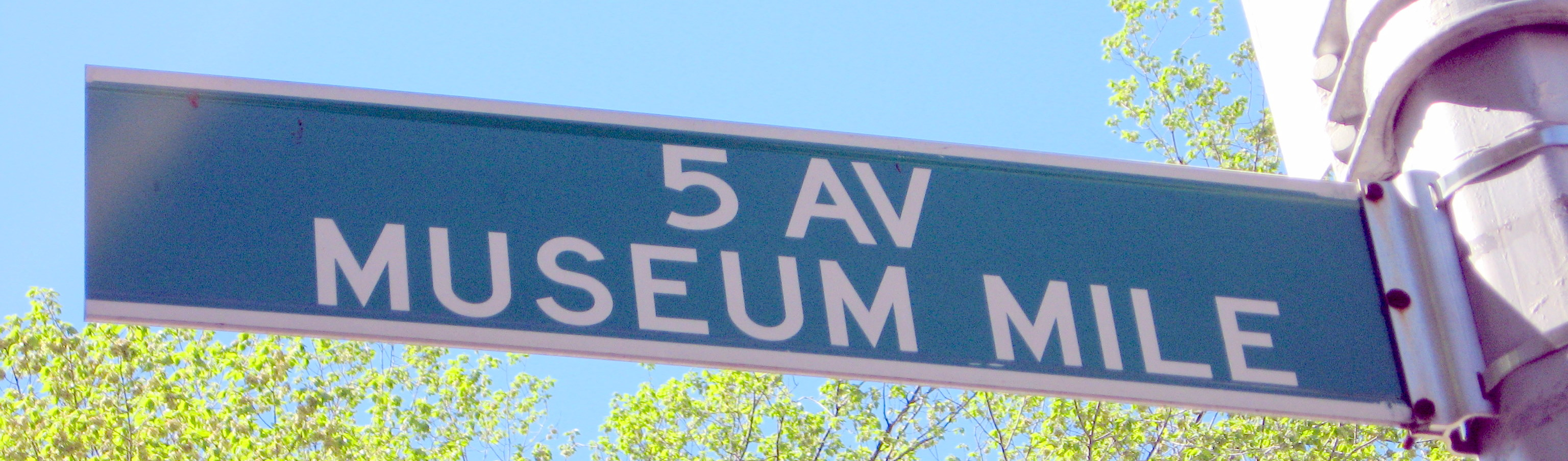
The Museum Mile street sign

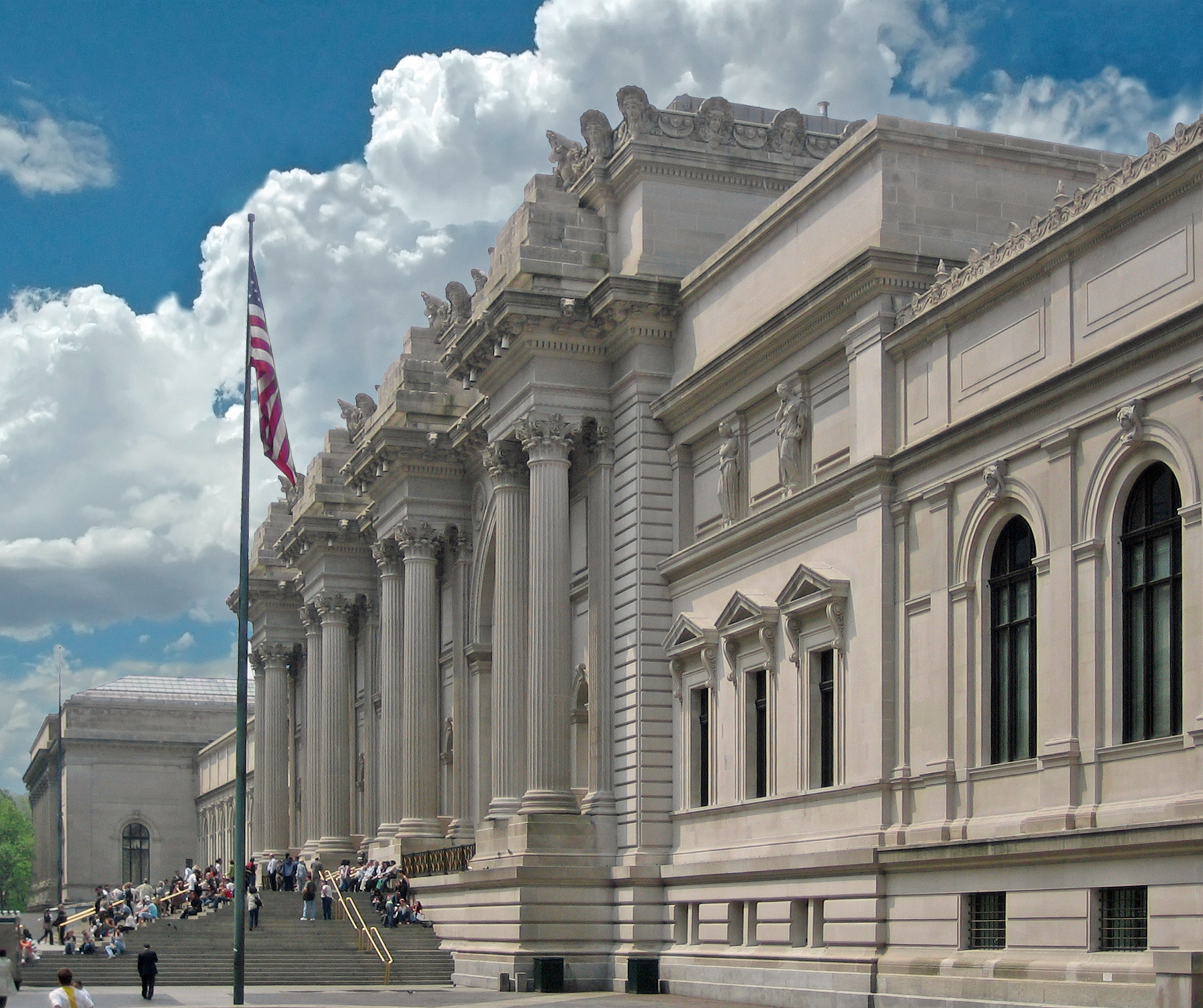
The Metropolitan Museum of Art on Fifth Avenue

=== Upper Fifth Avenue/Millionaire's Row ===
In the late 19th century, the very rich of New York began building mansions along the stretch of Fifth Avenue between 59th Street and 96th Street, looking onto Central Park. By the early 20th century, the portion of Fifth Avenue between 59th and 96th Streets had been nicknamed "Millionaire's Row", with mansions such as the Mrs. William B. Astor House and William A. Clark House. Entries to Central Park along this stretch include Inventor's Gate at 72nd Street, which gave access to the park's carriage drives, and Engineers' Gate at 90th Street, used by equestrians.

A milestone change for Fifth Avenue came in 1916, when the grand corner mansion at 72nd Street and Fifth Avenue that James A. Burden Jr. had erected in 1893 became the first private mansion on Fifth Avenue above 59th Street to be demolished to make way for a grand apartment house. The building at 907 Fifth Avenue began a trend, with its 12 stories around a central court, with two apartments to a floor. Its strong cornice above the fourth floor, just at the eaves height of its neighbors, was intended to soften its presence.

In January 1922, the city reacted to complaints about the ongoing replacement of Fifth Avenue's mansions by apartment buildings by restricting the height of future structures to 75 feet (23 m), about half the height of a ten-story apartment building. Architect J. E. R. Carpenter brought suit, and won a verdict overturning the height restriction in 1923. Carpenter argued that "the avenue would be greatly improved in appearance when deluxe apartments would replace the old-style mansions." Led by real estate investors Benjamin Winter, Sr. and Frederick Brown, the mansions were quickly torn down and replaced with apartment buildings.

This area contains many notable apartment buildings, including 810 Fifth Avenue and the Park Cinq, many of them built in the 1920s by architects such as Rosario Candela and J. E. R. Carpenter. A very few post-World War II structures break the unified limestone frontage, notably the Solomon R. Guggenheim Museum between 88th and 89th Streets.

=== Museum Mile ===
Museum Mile is the name for a section of Fifth Avenue running from 82nd to 110th streets on the Upper East Side, in an area sometimes called Upper Carnegie Hill. The Mile, which contains one of the densest displays of culture in the world, is actually three blocks longer than one mile (1.6 km). Nine museums occupy the length of this section of Fifth Avenue. A ninth museum, the Museum for African Art, joined the ensemble in 2009; its museum at 110th Street, the first new museum constructed on the Mile since the Guggenheim in 1959, opened in late 2012.

In addition to other programming, the museums collaborate for the annual Museum Mile Festival to promote the museums and increase visitation. The Museum Mile Festival traditionally takes place here on the second Tuesday in June from 6 – 9 p.m. It was established in 1979 by Lisa Taylor to increase public awareness of its member institutions and promote public support of the arts in New York City. The first festival was held on June 26, 1979. The nine museums are open free that evening to the public. Several of the participating museums offer outdoor art activities for children, live music and street performers. During the event, Fifth Avenue is closed to traffic.

Museums on the mile include:

- 110th Street – The Africa Center
- 105th Street – El Museo del Barrio
- 103rd Street – Museum of the City of New York
- 92nd Street – The Jewish Museum
- 91st Street – Cooper Hewitt, Smithsonian Design Museum (part of the Smithsonian Institution)
- 89th Street – National Academy Museum and School of Fine Arts
- 88th Street – Solomon R. Guggenheim Museum
- 86th Street – Neue Galerie New York
- 82nd Street – The Metropolitan Museum of Art

Further south, on the corner of Fifth Avenue and 70th Street, lies the Henry Clay Frick House, which houses the Frick Collection.

== Historical landmarks ==
Buildings on Fifth Avenue can have one of several types of official landmark designations:

- The New York City Landmarks Preservation Commission is the New York City agency that is responsible for identifying and designating the city's landmarks and the buildings in the city's historic districts. New York City landmarks (NYCL) can be categorized into one of several groups: individual (exterior), interior, and scenic landmarks.
- The National Register of Historic Places (NRHP) is the United States federal government's official list of districts, sites, buildings, structures and objects deemed worthy of preservation for their historical significance.
- The National Historic Landmark (NHL) focuses on places of significance in American history, architecture, engineering, or culture; all NHL sites are also on the NRHP.
- World Heritage Sites are designated by UNESCO as having cultural, historical, scientific or other form of significance, and are legally protected by international treaties.

=== Individual landmarks ===
Below is a list of historic sites on Fifth Avenue, from north to south. Historic districts are not included in this table, but are mentioned in § Historic districts. Buildings within historic districts, but no individual landmark designation, are not included in this table.

Name	Image	Address	Cross-street	NHL	NRHP	NYCL	Notes
369th Regiment Armory		2366 Fifth Avenue	142nd–143rd Streets		Yes	exterior	
St. Andrew's Church		2067 Fifth Avenue	127th Street		Yes	exterior	
Harlem Fire Watchtower		Marcus Garvey Park	122nd Street		Yes	exterior	
Central Park		—N/a	60th–110th Streets	Yes	Yes	scenic landmark	
Museum of the City of New York		1220–1227 Fifth Avenue	103rd–104th Streets			exterior	
Willard D. Straight House		1130 Fifth Avenue	94th Street			exterior	
Felix M. Warburg House		1109 Fifth Avenue	92nd Street		Yes	exterior	
Otto H. Kahn House		1100 Fifth Avenue (corner of)	1 East 91st Street			exterior	
Andrew Carnegie Mansion		2 East 91st Street	91st Street		Yes	exterior	
Solomon R. Guggenheim Museum		1009 Fifth Avenue	82nd Street	Yes	Yes	exterior and interior	Also designated as WHS
Duke Residence		1009 Fifth Avenue	82nd Street		Yes	exterior	
Metropolitan Museum of Art		1000 Fifth Avenue	80th–84th Streets	Yes	Yes	exterior and interior	
998 Fifth Avenue		998 Fifth Avenue	81st Street			exterior	
Harry F. Sinclair House		2 East 79th Street	79th Street	Yes	Yes		
Payne Whitney House		972 Fifth Avenue	78th–79th Streets, midblock			exterior	
James B. Duke House		1 East 78th Street	78th Street		Yes	exterior	
Edward S. Harkness House		1 East 75th Street	75th Street			exterior	
Henry Clay Frick House		1 East 70th Street	70th Street	Yes	Yes	exterior	
Robert Livingston Beeckman House		854 Fifth Avenue	66th–67th Streets, midblock			exterior	
Knickerbocker Club		2 East 62nd Street	62nd Street			exterior	
The Metropolitan Club		2 East 60th Street	60th Street			exterior	
Grand Army Plaza			58th–60th Streets			scenic landmark	
The Sherry-Netherland Sidewalk Clock		783 Fifth Avenue	59th Street		Yes		
Plaza Hotel		768 Fifth Avenue	58th–59th Streets	Yes	Yes	exterior and interior	
Bergdorf Goodman Building		754 Fifth Avenue	57th–58th Streets			exterior	
Crown Building		730 Fifth Avenue	56th–57th Streets			exterior	
Coty Building		714 Fifth Avenue	55th–56th Streets, midblock			exterior	
712 Fifth Avenue		712 Fifth Avenue	55th–56th Streets, midblock			exterior	
The Peninsula New York		696 Fifth Avenue	55th Street			exterior	
St. Regis New York		693 Fifth Avenue	55th Street			exterior	
Aeolian Building		689 Fifth Avenue	54th Street			exterior	
University Club of New York		1 West 54th Street	54th Street			exterior	
Saint Thomas Church		Corner	1 West 53rd Street			exterior	
Morton F. Plant & Edward Holbrook House		653 Fifth Avenue	52nd Street		Yes	exterior	
George W. Vanderbilt Residence		647 Fifth Avenue	52nd Street		Yes	exterior	
Rockefeller Center (including British Empire Building, La Maison Francaise, International Building)		1–75 Rockefeller Plaza	49th–51st Streets	Yes	Yes	complex	
St. Patrick's Cathedral		460 Madison Avenue	50th–51st Streets	Yes	Yes	exterior	
Saks Fifth Avenue Building		611 Fifth Avenue	49th–50th Streets			exterior	
Goelet (Swiss Center) Building		608 Fifth Avenue	49th–50th Streets			exterior and interior	
Charles Scribner's Sons Building		597 Fifth Avenue	48th Street			exterior and interior	
Fred F. French Building		551 Fifth Avenue	45th Street		Yes	exterior and interior	
Sidewalk Clock, 522 Fifth Avenue		522 Fifth Avenue	44th Street		Yes	object	
Manufacturers Trust Company Building		510 Fifth Avenue	43rd Street			exterior and partial interior	
500 Fifth Avenue		500 Fifth Avenue	42nd Street			exterior	
New York Public Library Main Branch		476 Fifth Avenue	40th–42nd Streets	Yes	Yes	exterior and partial interior	
Knox Building		452 Fifth Avenue	40th Street		Yes	exterior	
Lord & Taylor Building		424 Fifth Avenue	38th Street			exterior	
Stewart & Company Building		402 Fifth Avenue	37th Street			exterior	
Tiffany and Company Building		401 Fifth Avenue	37th Street		Yes	exterior	
390 Fifth Avenue		390 Fifth Avenue	36th Street			exterior	
B. Altman and Company Building		355–371 Fifth Avenue	34th–35th Streets			Yes	
Empire State Building		350 Fifth Avenue	33rd–34th Streets	Yes	Yes	exterior and partial interior	
The Wilbraham		284 Fifth Avenue	30th Street		Yes	exterior	
Marble Collegiate Church		272 Fifth Avenue	29th Street		Yes	exterior	
Sidewalk Clock, 200 Fifth Avenue		200 Fifth Avenue	24th Street		Yes	object	
Flatiron Building		173–185 Fifth Avenue	22nd–23rd Streets	Yes	Yes	exterior	
Scribner Building		153–157 Fifth Avenue	21st–22nd Streets, midblock		Yes	exterior	
Salmagundi Club		47 Fifth Avenue	11th–12th Streets, midblock		Yes	exterior	

=== Historic districts ===
There are numerous historic districts through which Fifth Avenue passes. Buildings in these districts with individual landmark designations are described in § Individual landmarks. From north to south, the districts are:

- The Carnegie Hill Historic District, a city landmark district, which covers 400 buildings, primarily along Fifth Avenue from 86th to 98th Street, as well as on side streets extending east to Madison, Park, and Lexington Avenues.
- The Metropolitan Museum Historic District, a city landmark district, which consists of properties on Fifth Avenue between 79th and 86th Streets, outside the Metropolitan Museum of Art, as well as properties on several side streets.
- The Upper East Side Historic District, a city and NRHP district. The city district runs from 59th to 78th Streets along Fifth Avenue, and up to Third Avenue at some points.
- The Madison Square North Historic District, a city landmark district, which covers 96 buildings from 25th to 29th Streets around Broadway, Fifth Avenue, and side streets.
- The Ladies' Mile Historic District, a city landmark district, which covers 440 buildings from roughly 15th Street to 24th Street and from Park Avenue South to west of Sixth Avenue.
- The Greenwich Village Historic District, a city landmark district, which covers much of Greenwich Village and includes almost all buildings on Fifth Avenue south of 12th Street.

In the 1980s, there was also a proposal for a historic district on Fifth Avenue between 48th and 58th Streets. At the time, St. Patrick's Cathedral, St. Thomas Church, the Cartier Building at number 651, the University Club, the Rizzoli Building at number 712, and the Coty Building at number 714 were official city landmarks. However, other structures on that strip had no protection yet, including Rockefeller Center, the Elizabeth Arden Building at 689 Fifth Avenue, the St. Regis Hotel, the Peninsula Hotel, and the Bergdorf Goodman Building.

=== Other ===
In addition, the cooperative apartment building at 2 Fifth Avenue was named a New York cultural landmark on December 12, 2013, by the Historic Landmark Preservation Center, as the last residence of former New York City Mayor Ed Koch.

== Economy ==
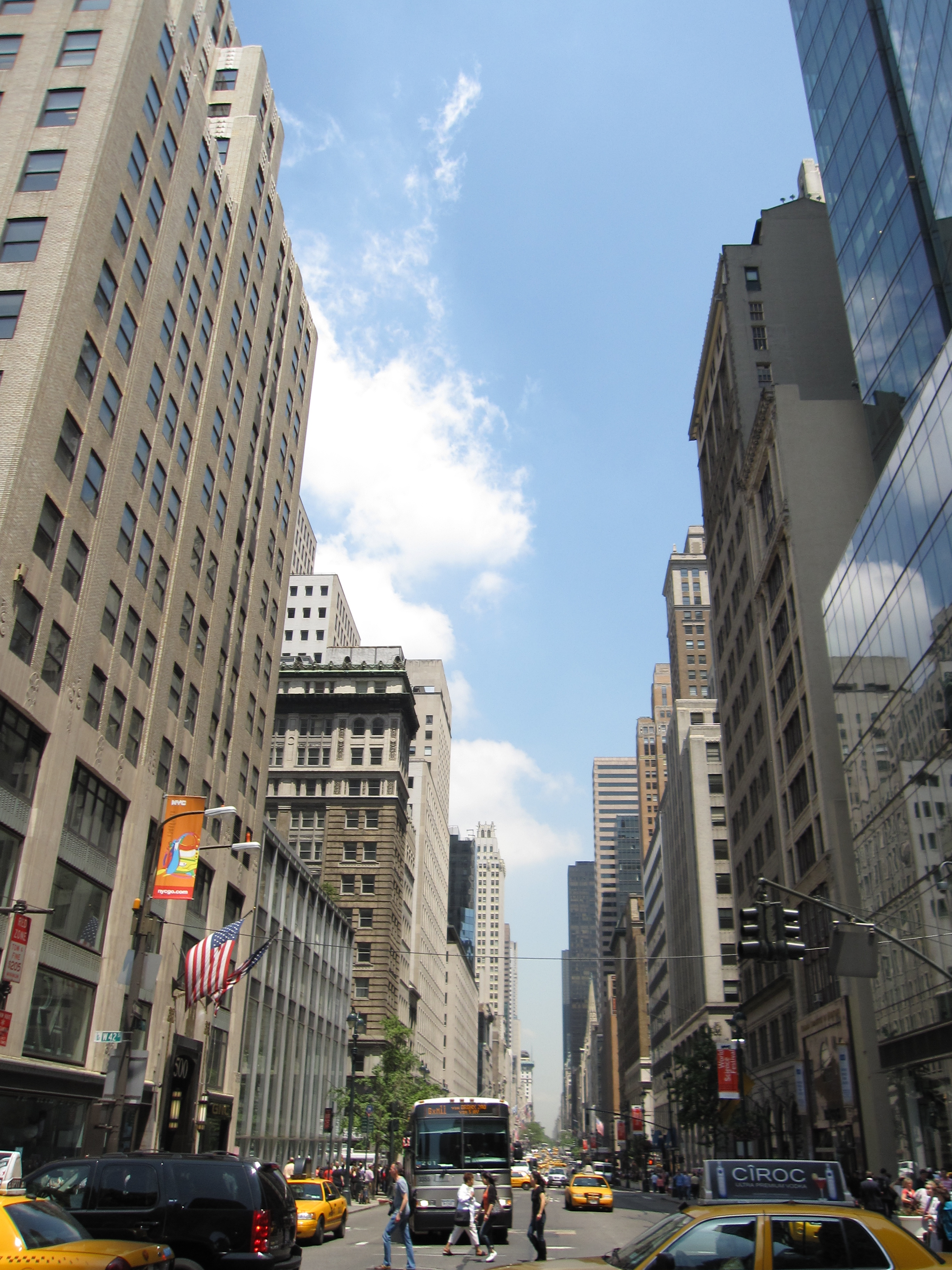
Fifth Avenue in Midtown Manhattan, the most expensive shopping street in the world and home to many boutiques and flagship stores

Between 49th Street and 60th Street, Fifth Avenue is lined with prestigious boutiques and flagship stores and is consistently ranked the most expensive shopping street in the world.

Many luxury goods, fashion, and sport brand boutiques are located on Fifth Avenue, including Louis Vuitton, Tiffany & Co. (whose flagship is at 57th Street), Gucci, Prada, Armani, Tommy Hilfiger, Cartier, Omega, Chanel, Harry Winston, Salvatore Ferragamo, Nike, Escada, Rolex, Bvlgari, Emilio Pucci, Ermenegildo Zegna, Abercrombie & Fitch, Hollister Co., De Beers, Emanuel Ungaro, Gap, Versace, Lindt Chocolate Shop, Henri Bendel, NBA Store, Oxxford Clothes, Microsoft Store, Sephora, Tourneau, and Wempe. Luxury department stores include Saks Fifth Avenue and Bergdorf Goodman. Fifth Avenue also is home to an Apple Store.

Many airlines in the pre-internet era at one time had ticketing offices along Fifth Avenue. With the advent of the internet and online ticketing, these ticketing offices were ultimately replaced by other businesses on Fifth Avenue. Pan American World Airways went out of business, while Air France, Finnair, and KLM moved their ticket offices to other areas in Midtown Manhattan.

== Gallery ==
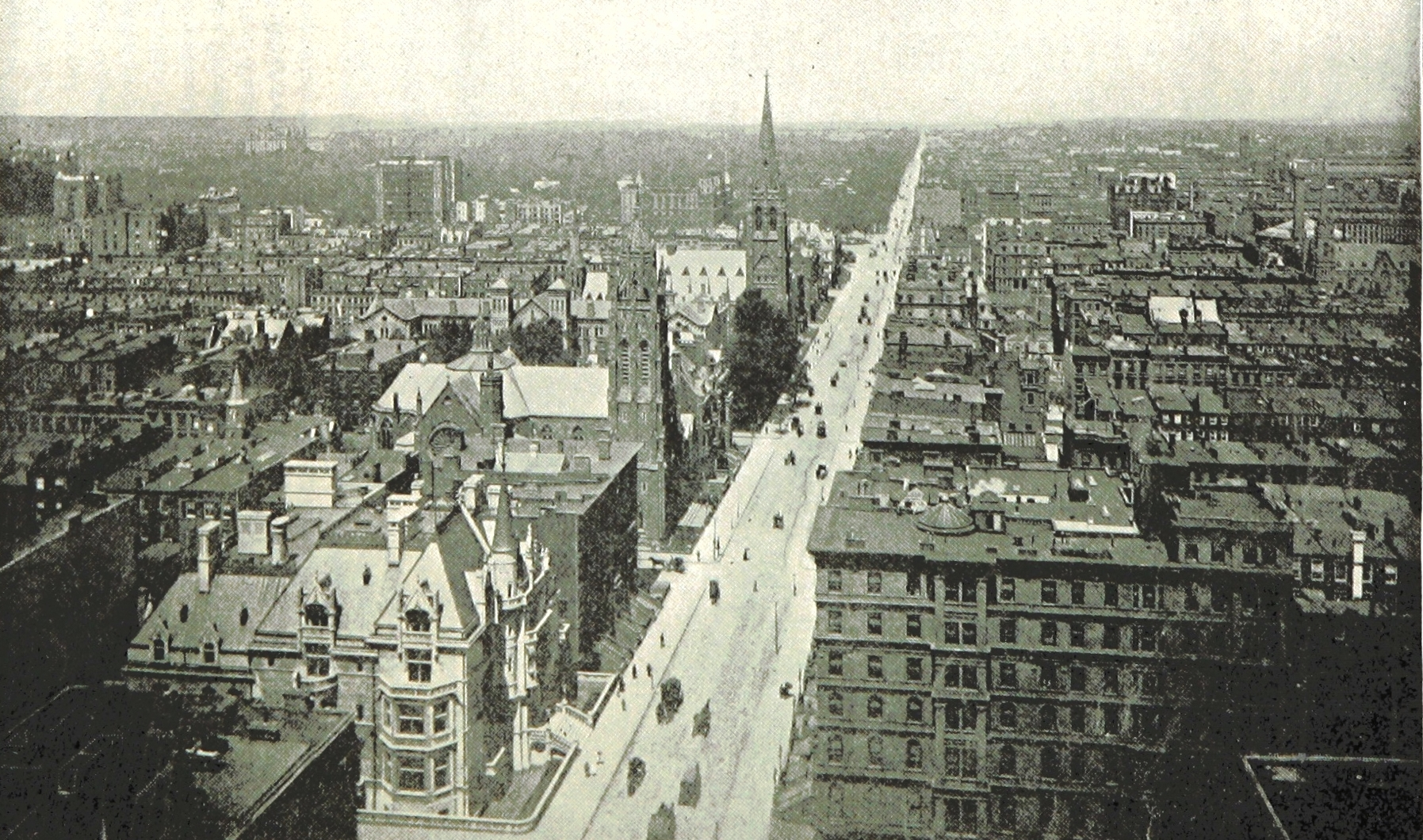
Bird's-eye view looking north from 51st St. c. 1893

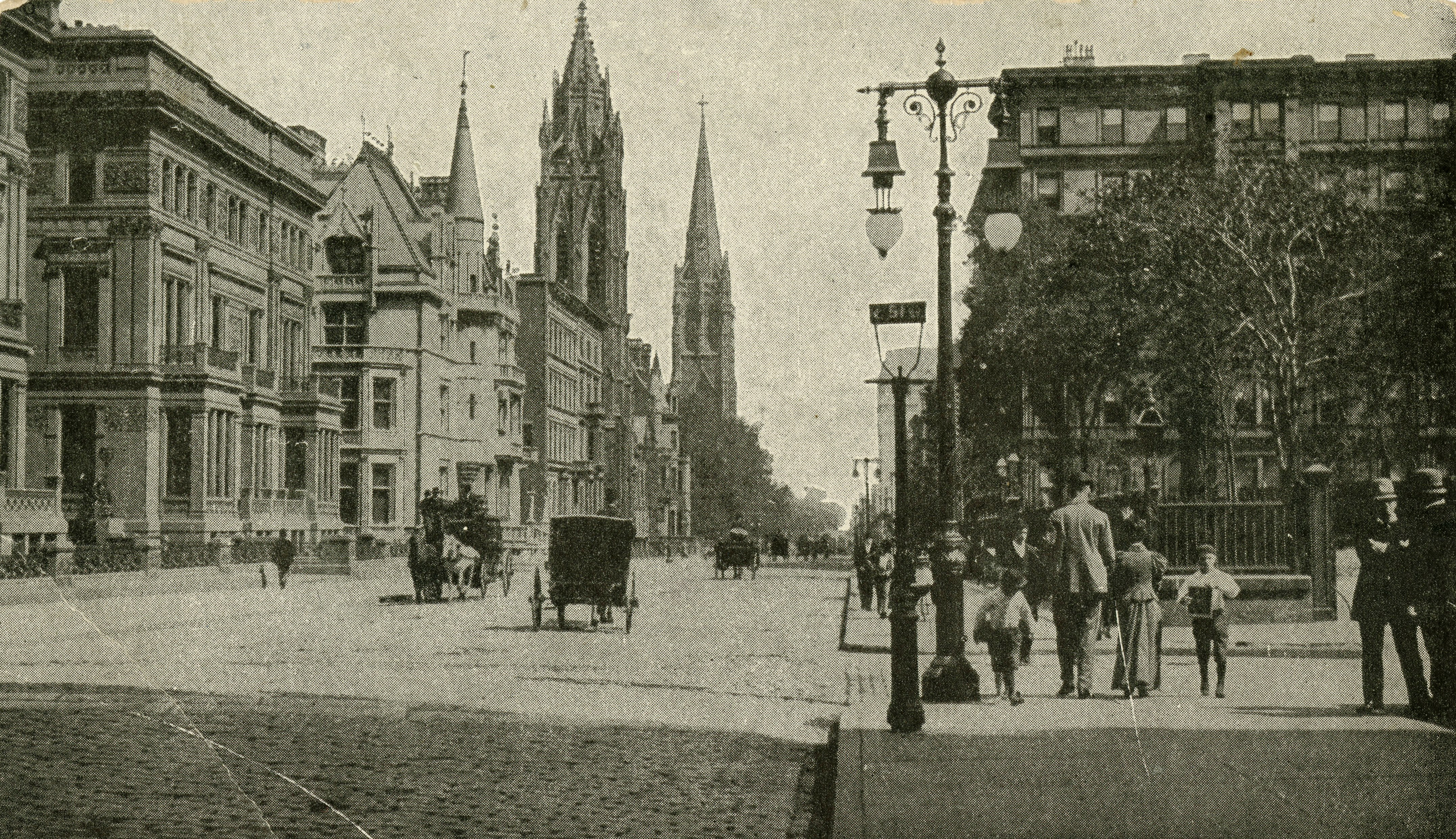
Street view looking north from 51st St. c. 1895

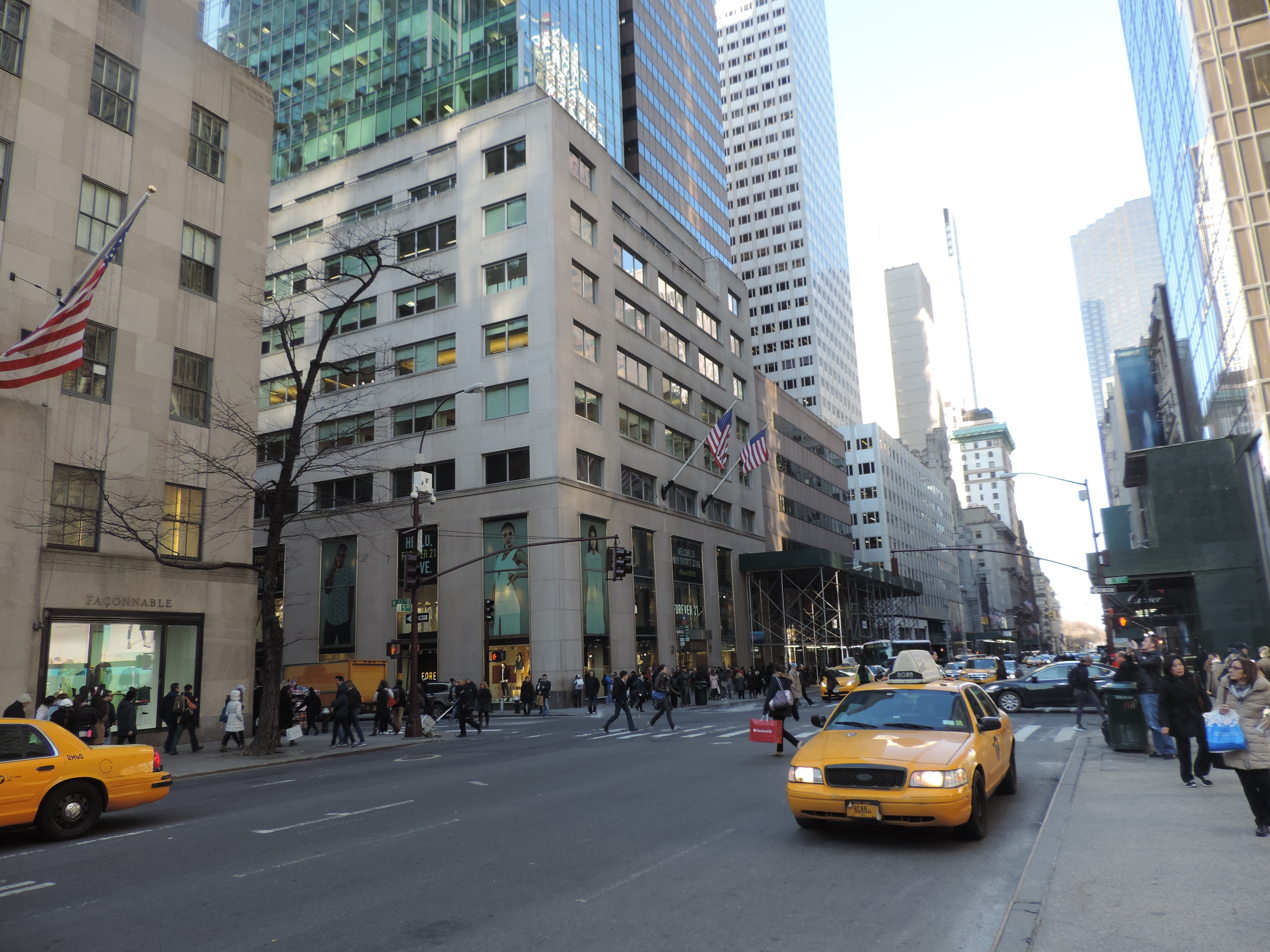
The same shot in March 2015

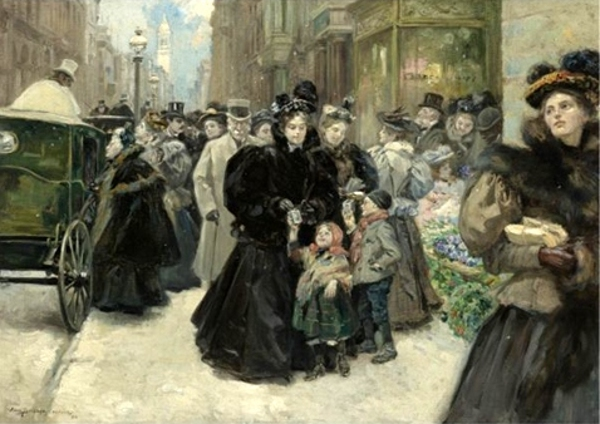
Christmas on Fifth Avenue in 1896

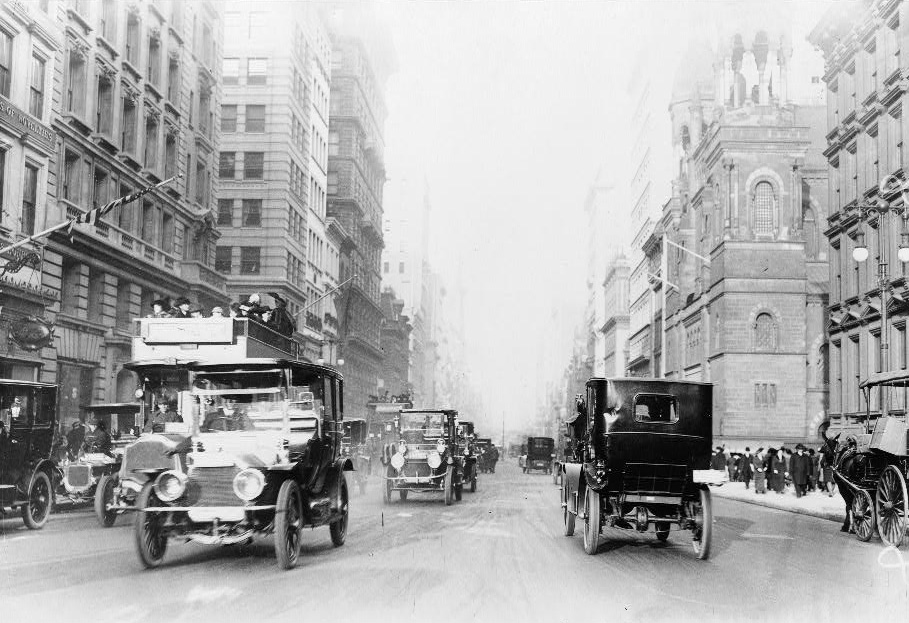
Fifth Avenue, 1918

Fifth Avenue begins at the Washington Square Arch in Washington Square Park

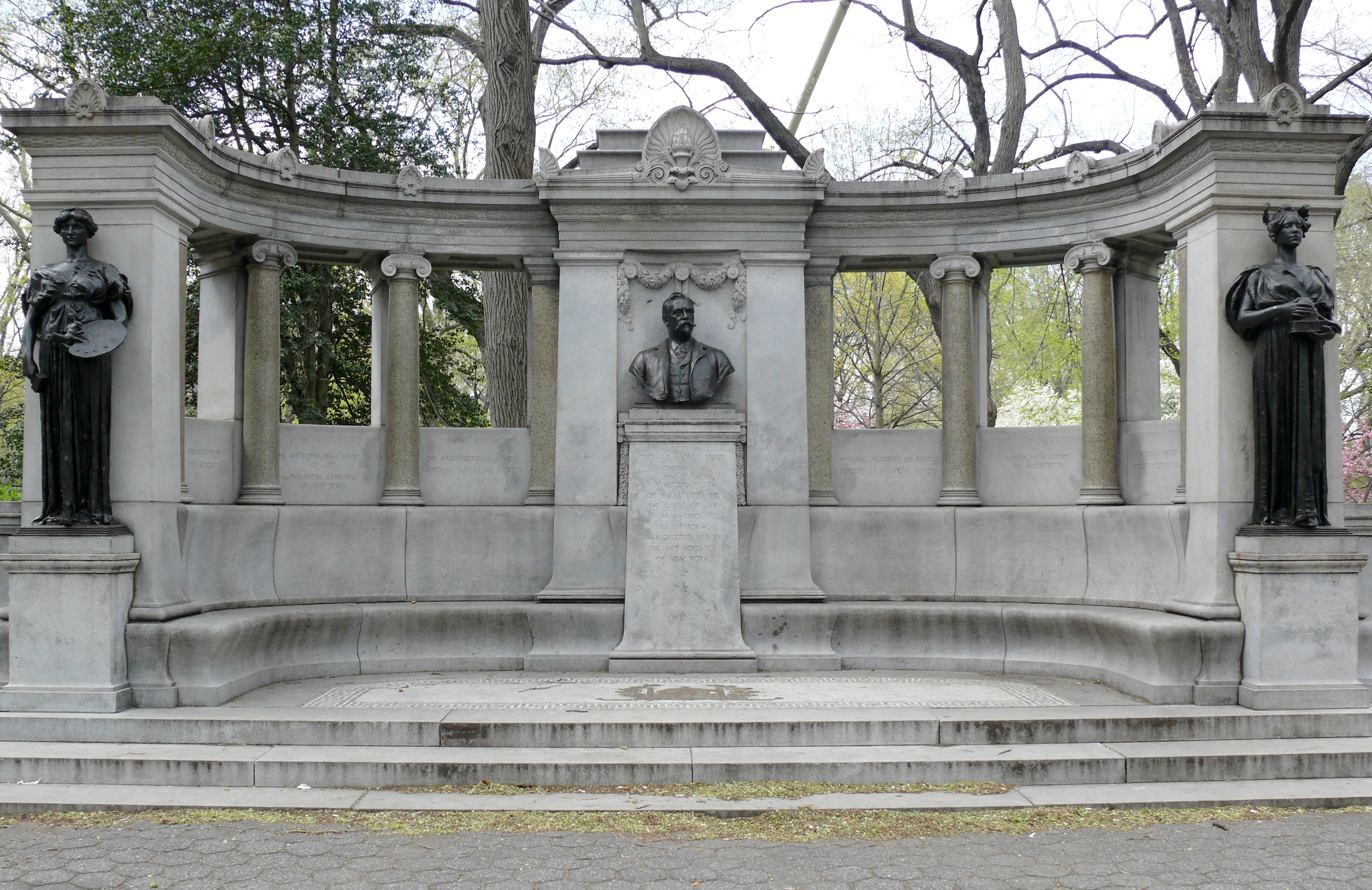
Memorial to New York architect Richard Morris Hunt, Fifth Avenue between 70th and 71st Streets

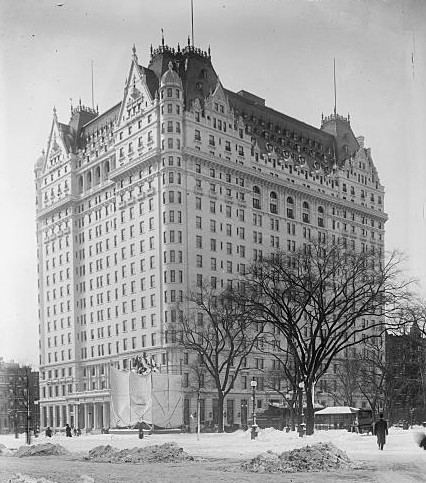
The Plaza Hotel, c. 1907

== See also ==
- List of shopping streets and districts by city
- Jerome Avenue, a shopping street and major thoroughfare in the Bronx
- Fifth Avenue Mile, annual road race
