= WVNJ =

- Oakland, New Jersey; United States
- Broadcast area: New York metropolitan area
- Frequency: 1160 kHz
- Branding: Relevant Radio

Programming
- Format: Christian radio

Ownership
- Owner: Relevant Radio; (Relevant Radio, Inc.)
- Sister stations: WNSW

History
- First air date: 1992
- Call sign meaning: Voice of New Jersey

Technical information
- Licensing authority: FCC
- Facility ID: 68956
- Class: B
- Power: 20,000 watts (day); 2,500 watts (night)
- Transmitter coordinates: 41°03′23″N 74°14′58″W

Links
- Public license information: Public file; LMS
- Webcast: Listen live
- Website: relevantradio.com

WVNJ (1160 AM) is a religious formatted radio station licensed to Oakland, New Jersey and serving Bergen County, New Jersey and parts of the New York City area. The station broadcasts Catholic programming, and is owned-and-operated by Relevant Radio, Inc.

WVNJ broadcasts using a directional antenna with 20,000 watts daytime. At night it reduces power to 2,500 watts to avoid interference with WYLL in Chicago.

== History ==
WVNJ began operation on AM 1160 as a CP in 1987 and signed on in 1992. The station initially offered an oldies format featuring mostly R&B music from 1955 to 1974. The format did not do well and in January 1996 WVNJ flipped to an adult standards format known as "The Station Of The Stars" featuring the music of Frank Sinatra, Dean Martin, The Mills Brothers, Peggy Lee, Tommy Dorsey, Ray Charles, Nat King Cole, Johnny Mathis, Bing Crosby, McGuire Sisters, Bobby Darin, Perry Como, Glenn Miller, Sammy Davis Jr., and many others. The station stayed away from baby boomer pop with the exception of quazi-rock and roll artists like Ray Charles.

The station also added former 1130 WNEW air personalities such as Ted Brown, Jim Lowe, Jim Harlan, Mike Prelee, Mike Myers, and Bobby Ryan. Bill Gaghan was the program director during Ted Brown's tenure. Throughout 1996, 1997, and 1998 the station was somewhat profitable but ratings were modest at best. Advertising on the station gradually faded in 1998. With WQEW leaving the format after Christmas 1998, it was hoped that WVNJ would pick up some of their advertisers and ratings. However, by 1999 Adult Standards had become a tough format to sell and WVNJ was losing sponsors. As a result, the station began automating evenings and overnights.

In 2002, WVNJ began selling blocks of evening time as well as blocks of weekend time to specialty programmers as well as for infomercials. By 2003, WVNJ added more infomercials to middays during the week as well, to turn a profit. By 2006, WVNJ was down to only a few hours of music per week.

=== WVNJ "The Voice" ===
Starting in late 2006, WVNJ became " The Voice". When the format first began, the station remained playing music, more talk shows and infomercials were added as 2007 rolled in. WVNJ began to lose the standards music and added more talk and infomercials. Later on in 2007 WVNJ added its first morning talk show called "The Voice In The Morning" with Gary O'Neill and Kathleen Maloney. The show was canceled in early November 2007 and replaced in January 2008 by another local morning show. The replacement was a talk show hosted by Sam Greenfield (formerly of WEVD and WWRL) and long time WVNJ announcer Pete Buckey.

On September 13, 2018, it was announced that Universal Broadcasting of New York was selling WVNJ to Immaculate Heart Media. The sale was consummated on November 26, 2018.
