= The Howlin' Wolf Story – The Secret History of Rock & Roll =

The Howlin' Wolf Story – The Secret History of Rock & Roll is a 2003 documentary film about the life of blues legend Chester Arthur Burnett, whose stage name was Howlin' Wolf. It features much new and rare material, including Howlin' Wolf performing "How Many More Years?" on the TV musical show Shindig!, introduced by the Rolling Stones, drummer Sam Lay's home movies of stars of the Chicago Blues from the early 1960s, interviews with Howlin' Wolf's family, Hubert Sumlin, Billy Boy Arnold, Marshall Chess and many others, photographs of Howlin' Wolf and his band through their careers, and much else.

The film explains how his parents separated when he was young and how his mother Gertrude threw him out of the house at a very early age. He then lived with his abusive uncle Will Young. He left at age 13 to live with his father on his farm in the Mississippi Delta, where he finally found happiness. Even as an adult performer, he would return annually to work on the farm beside his father.

The film shows that, beginning in 1928, Charlie Patton became his teacher and mentor, and goes on to show many pivotal moments in his career. including his initial success in West Memphis, Arkansas in the post-World War II years, his relocation to Chicago, and his acceptance in Europe and connections with white rock stars starting with the Rolling Stones in 1966. Footage of Howlin' Wolf's performances at various Chicago nightclubs in the 1950s and 1960s, at the American Folk Blues Festival in Hamburg, Germany in 1964 and at the Newport Folk Festival in 1966 is included.

The film portrays his efforts to build a loving family life after his unsuccessful first marriage. His second marriage lasted until his death and he was devoted to that wife and their two daughters who were both interviewed at length about their family life. Illiterate until well into adulthood, he spent five years studying while traveling as a performer to learn to read, write and perform arithmetic.

Many years later when he was terminally ill with kidney disease, he wanted to see his mother again to reconcile, but she would not visit him because, as she said, he "sang the devil’s music."

A reviewer for Mashable wrote "Burnett's raspy, tortured growl is the sound of a freight train moaning at midnight, and it's just one piece of the portrait painted in filmmaker Don McGlynn's The Howlin' Wolf Story." It is described as "the definitive film about the Wolf" in the book Moanin' at Midnight: The Life and Times of Howlin' Wolf.

The film was directed by video biographer Don McGlynn, and produced by Joe Lauro.
