= Ted Brown (radio) =

American radio personality (1924–2005)

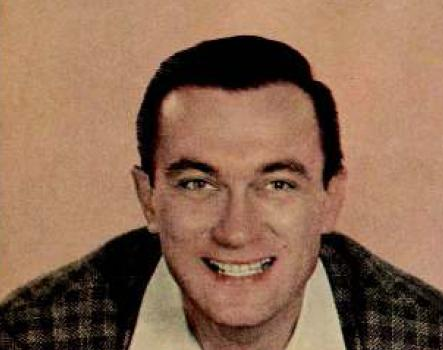
- Brown in 1956
- Born: Theodore David Brown; May 5, 1924; Collingswood, New Jersey, U.S.
- Died: March 20, 2005 (aged 80); Riverdale, Bronx, New York, U.S.
- Education: Roanoke College
- Occupations: Radio personality and tail gunner
- Spouse: Sylvia Miles (m. 1963; div. 1970)

Theodore David Brown (May 5, 1924 – March 20, 2005) was an American radio personality who worked at several stations in New York City including WMGM, WNEW and WNBC during the 1950s and 1960s, the golden age of AM radio.

== Early life ==
Brown was born in Collingswood, New Jersey, the son of Rose and Meyer Nathan Brown, a grocery store owner. His parents were Russian Jewish immigrants. Brown attended Roanoke College in Salem, Virginia. He served in the United States Army Air Forces as a tail gunner on a B-17 bomber during World War II, and spent 18 months as a prisoner of war in Stalag IX-C after being shot down over Germany. During the 1950s, Brown broadcast from a studio in the basement of his home in the Riverdale section of the Bronx.

== Radio career ==
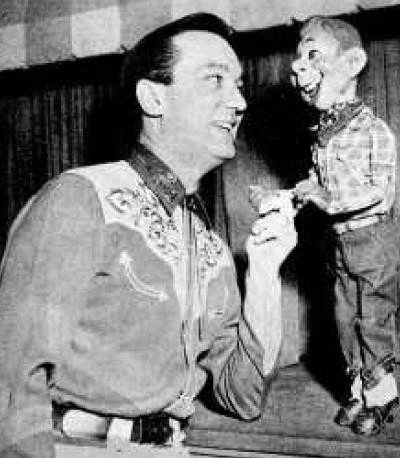
Brown as "Bison Bill" when he filled in for Bob Smith on Howdy Doody.

Brown joined New York radio station WOR, doing mostly nighttime music shows, in late 1946. In August, 1949, he filled in for WNEW 1130's morning team of Gene Klavan and Dee Finch and was given his own early morning show in August of that year. He jumped to weekends at rival station WMGM in December of the same year. Brown continued as the station's morning air personality until a programming shake-up led to a line-up and call letters change (to WHN) in September, 1962. Brown then switched back to WNEW and a late afternoon shift. He was hired away by yet another rival station, WNBC-AM, to do its afternoon shift, in February, 1970. Completing a series of relocations dizzying even for the whirlwind New York radio market of the '60s and '70s, WNEW hired him back from WNBC for the afternoon show in August, 1972. He moved to mornings in 1978 and remained after WNEW began evolving in 1979 to Adult Standards/Big Bands by 1981. He continued working at WNEW until 1989 when he semi-retired. In the 1990s he helped host New York Giants football games on WNEW. From 1993-95, Brown worked mid-days at WRIV, a standards station in Riverhead, New York, and on WVNJ 1160 in Oakland, New Jersey, playing standards and big bands from early in 1996 to about 1998 when he suffered a stroke. He signed off his show with the phrase "Warm up that coffee Mama, I'm coming home."

== Howdy Doody Show ==
In October 1954, Brown was hired to temporarily replace the ailing Bob Smith on the daily The Howdy Doody Show, playing Bison Bill, after Bob Smith had suffered a heart attack on Labor Day that year and continued in playing the part until Smith returned at the start of the new season in September 1955.

In the summer of 1959 he hosted a daytime game show called Across the Board for ABC Television.

== Personal life ==
Three times married himself, his second wife was actress Sylvia Miles; the union ended in an acrimonious divorce in 1970, with Brown paying Miles alimony for decades; he was quoted in an interview as saying "It's been between $200,000 and $300,000". He was her third and last husband.

== Death ==
Brown died at the Hebrew Home for the Aged in Riverdale due to complications of a stroke he had suffered several years earlier.
