= Harlem Fire Watchtower =

Fire watch tower in Manhattan, New York

Coordinates: 40.804097°N 73.94357°W

- U.S. National Register of Historic Places
- New York State Register of Historic Places
- New York City Landmark
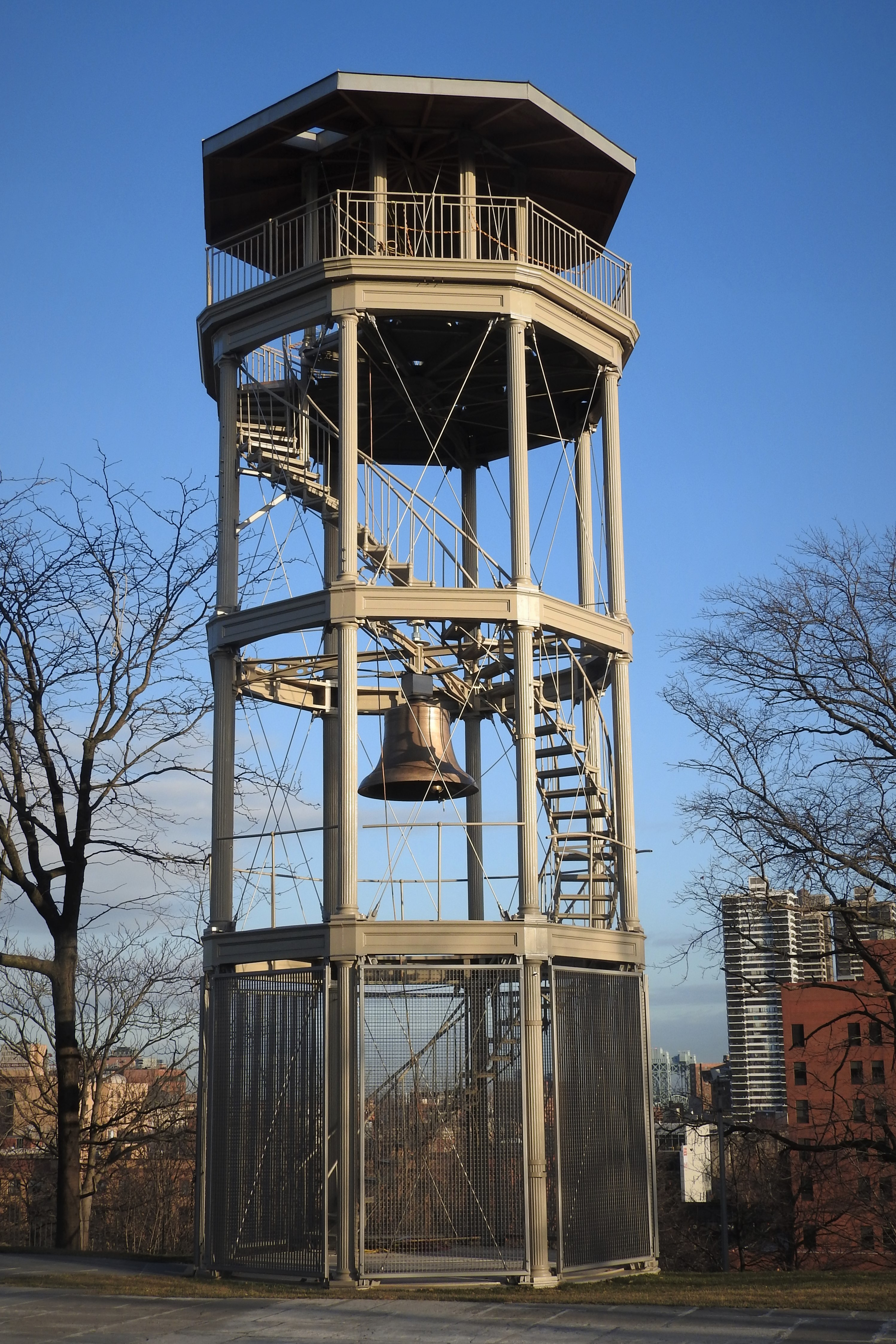
- Restored in 2020

- Location within Manhattan Location within New York City Location within New York Location within the United States
- Location: Marcus Garvey Park, East 122nd Street, Manhattan, New York City, New York
- Built: 1855-1857
- Architect: Julius H. Kroehl
- Architectural style: Fire watchtower
- Part of: Marcus Garvey Park (ID100011764)
- NRHP reference No.: 76001240
- NYSRHP No.: 06101.002477
- NYCL No.: 0313

Significant dates
- Added to NRHP: June 21, 1976
- Designated NYSRHP: June 23, 1980
- Designated NYCL: July 12, 1967

The Harlem Fire Watchtower, also known as the Mount Morris Fire Watchtower, is a fire lookout tower at Marcus Garvey Park in Harlem, Manhattan, New York City. It is the only survivor of 11 cast-iron watchtowers placed throughout the city starting in the 1850s. Standing 47 feet (14 m) tall, it was built by Julius H. Kroehl for $2,300 based on a design by James Bogardus.

The Mount Morris Park tower went into service in 1857 in response to Harlem residents’ demand. The towers gave volunteers a perch from which to watch for fires that were common in the wooden structures that then made up much of New York City, and the watchers then spread the word via bell ringing. Later, electric telegraphs were installed but the bell provided local alarms. When pull boxes and other technological advances rendered the fire watchtowers obsolete, the system was discontinued and the other towers eventually were destroyed. Harlem's, protected in the middle of a park, endured.

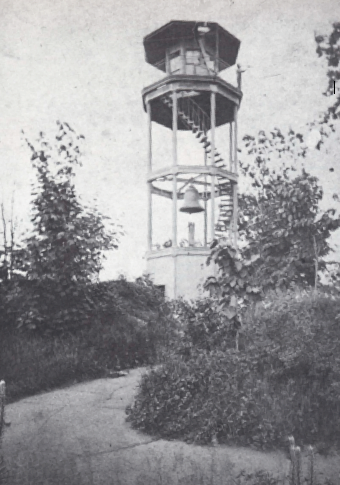
Harlem Fire Watchtower in 1857 in Mount Morris Park

During the New Deal, the area surrounding the watchtower was rebuilt by government employees as part of the Works Project Administration jobs program. This project created a gracious plaza (sometimes called "the Acropolis"), stone retaining wall, and wide steps approaching the summit from several sides for pedestrians. The tower was designated a city landmark in 1967 and was listed on the National Register of Historic Places in 1976. The last work on the watchtower came in 1994, but cracks in the overall structure and in the bell remained. The granite parapet along the top was in need of restoration.

Weather, lack of maintenance, and neglect took their toll over the years. Roof damage allowed water into the structure, rusting structural members. The original copper roof deteriorated and fell off, exposing the interior to more damage. Many of the internal steps were missing and park visitors may no longer climb them or get near the structure, which is protected by a fence. In 2013, the Mount Morris Park Community Improvement Association and the Marcus Garvey Park Alliance partnered with the New York City Department of Parks and Recreation to raise $4 million to restore the Harlem Watchtower, led by Valerie Jo Bradley. Starting in late 2014, NYC Parks disassembled the tower to restore the structure and ensure its soundness and stability before reconstruction. The tower reopened to visitors in December 2019.

== See also ==
- List of New York City Designated Landmarks in Manhattan from 14th to 59th Streets
- National Register of Historic Places listings in Manhattan from 14th to 59th Streets
