= Tony Lawrence (singer) =

American entertainer and promoter

Tony Lawrence (born c. 1936; whereabouts unknown) is a Kittitian-American singer, actor, community activist and festival organiser. In the late 1960s and early 1970s, he was one of the main organisers of the annual Harlem Cultural Festival in New York City, including the 1969 festival celebrated in the 2021 documentary film Summer of Soul. His activities after the 1980s, and possible death, are unconfirmed.

== Early life ==
Lawrence was born in St. Kitts in the Caribbean, in about 1936. At the age of two he moved with his family to Portsmouth, Virginia, and then attended Crestwood High School and sang with his school band. He won an athletic scholarship to Morgan State College in Baltimore, and later spent over two years with the US Army's Special Services, where he developed his talents as an entertainer. In 1957, he was a member of the organising committee for the inaugural St. Kitts Carnival. He won a scholarship to the American Theatre Wing, appearing as an actor in plays by Shakespeare and others, graduating in 1960. He performed in several Broadway and off-Broadway shows, and settled in New York City.

== Work as performer and concert promoter ==
From the late 1950s, he recorded and released several singles for the small Jude record label in New York, in a variety of styles including calypso and R&B. His most successful record was "You Got to Show Me", recorded in 1961 for the Silver Bid label, which reached number 114 on the Billboard pop chart. He was noted for his stylish clothes and good looks. By the early 1960s, publicity referred to him as "The Continental Dreamboat", and referred to "his expensive appetite for flashy sports cars, sleek motor boats, and extensive world-wide travel." He appeared on networked television shows and in 1962 secured a regular 15-minute daily program in New York. In 1962, reportedly at the invitation of Princess Margaret, Lawrence performed at the Jamaica Independence Festival, and he appeared in Paris nightclubs in 1964. He also had small and uncredited acting roles in movies including Dr. No (1962) and The Pawnbroker (1964). He became a successful nightclub entertainer, and in 1965 had a reportedly successful nationwide tour on behalf of the "Teen 'N Tea Caravan", sponsored by the Tea Council of the U.S.A.

Lawrence started community work in Harlem as director of the Christ Community Church Recreation Center, and in 1965 led fundraising projects in support of new playgrounds as director of the John Fitzgerald Kennedy Youth Foundation in New York City. The initiative, including concerts and events hosted by Lawrence, allowed the church to buy vacant lots in Harlem and convert them into small community park areas as part of a Head Start program. After the election of Mayor John Lindsay in 1966, he began working under August Heckscher II in the city's Parks Department, and set up block parties in some of the new parks, occasionally performing as well as introducing local bands. The following year, he helped set up the first Harlem Cultural Festival. The free events, held across Harlem, included "a Harlem Hollywood Night, boxing demonstrations, a fashion show, go-kart grand prix, the first Miss Harlem contest, and concerts featuring soul, gospel, calypso, and Puerto Rican music". Lawrence continued to perform in clubs in the winter months, and organised the annual festival from the Parks Department in the spring and summer.

The second festival in 1968 attracted a wider range of performers, including Count Basie, Bobby "Blue" Bland, Tito Puente, and Mahalia Jackson. It was filmed by documentary maker Hal Tulchin, and excerpts were broadcast on WNEW-TV in New York. Lawrence also directed the 1969 festival, held in Mount Morris Park. He secured additional sponsorship from Maxwell House, as well as a wide range of performers including Nina Simone, B. B. King, the Staple Singers, and Stevie Wonder. The event, taking place over several weekends, was again filmed by Tulchin, and also involved the participation of community activists and civic leaders including Jesse Jackson. Two hour-long specials were broadcast nationally by CBS in July and September 1969. Lawrence then organised the "Tony Lawrence Love Festival", held in Newark, New Jersey in October 1969, and featuring Bobby Bland and The Chambers Brothers. Filmed by Tulchin, the concert was broadcast by NBC the following month.

Lawrence made plans for further festivals, aiming to turn the Harlem festival into an international touring enterprise, and made recordings aimed at promoting the festivals. However, a shortage of funding meant that the plans failed to materialize. In 1972, Lawrence made a series of allegations in the Amsterdam News against two of his former legal and business partners, claiming financial irregularities. He took legal action against them for fraud, and also claimed that an attempt had been made on his life and that it remained under threat from the Mafia. The Amsterdam News noted that Lawrence's claims were unsubstantiated, and, at the urging of Shirley Chisholm and Charles Rangel, the legal action was dropped. Lawrence also made claims against Tulchin over ownership of the recordings, and attempted to set up his own film company, Uganda Productions.

Lawrence organised further, smaller, versions of the Harlem Cultural Festival in 1973 and 1974. In 1974, he attempted to set up an International Harlem Cultural Festival, but the plans did not proceed.

== Later activities, and unconfirmed death ==
He continued to appear occasionally as a singer in nightclubs into the 1980s, and in local theatrical productions, before disappearing from public life. Former colleagues described Lawrence as an enigma, one saying "you never knew where he had been or what he had been up to."

When work started, following Tulchin's death in 2017, on preparing and editing the films for release, several of those who had previously worked with Lawrence assumed that he had died. In 2021, in writing about the documentary film Summer of Soul based around Tulchin's film of the 1969 festival, Rolling Stone reported that it had been "not able to find any confirmation of Lawrence’s death nor any records of his whereabouts."

== Discography ==
- "Put De Money Where De Mouth Is" (1959)
- "When I Grow Too Old To Dream" (1960)
- "You Got To Show Me" (1961)
- "I Love Her So" (1961)
- "I Need Somebody" (1961)
- "That's How I Feel" (1964)
- "When I Grow Too Old To Dream" (1964)
- "Fun City U.S.A." (1968)
- "Harlem Cultural Festival" (1969)
