= Harlem Cultural Festival =

Music festival

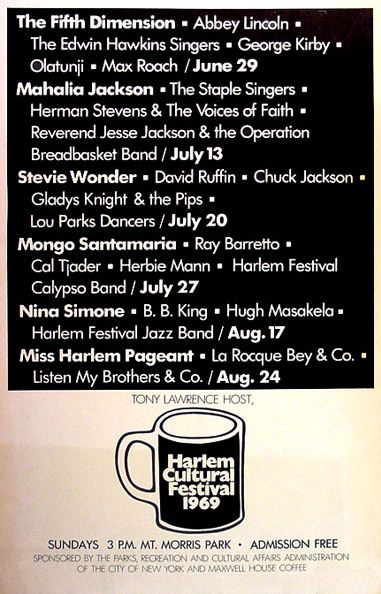
- Poster for the 1969 festival
- Genre: Rock music, R&B, soul music, jazz, pop music, gospel
- Dates: June 29 – August 24, 1969
- Locations: Mount Morris Park in Harlem; Manhattan; New York City
- Founders: Tony Lawrence

The Harlem Cultural Festival was a series of events, mainly music concerts, held annually in Harlem, Manhattan, between 1967 and 1969 which celebrated soul, jazz and gospel and black music and culture and promoted Black pride. The most successful series of concerts, in 1969, became known informally as Black Woodstock, and is presented in the 2021 documentary film Summer of Soul.

Although the 1968 and 1969 events were videotaped by Hal Tulchin, the festival had difficulty gaining publicity, partially due to lack of interest by television networks, which felt there would be little benefit in broadcasting it. What was filmed was stored in a basement and hidden from history for decades. The 1969 event took place around the same time as the Woodstock festival, which may have drawn media attention away from Harlem.

== Origins and early festivals ==
A Harlem Cultural Festival was first proposed in 1964 to bring life to the Harlem neighborhood. At the same time, in the mid-1960s, nightclub singer Tony Lawrence began working on community initiatives in Harlem, initially for local churches, but from 1966 working under New York City Mayor John Lindsay and Parks Commissioner August Heckscher. In 1967, Lawrence helped set up the first Harlem Cultural Festival, a series of free events held across Harlem that included "a Harlem Hollywood Night, boxing demonstrations, a fashion show, go-kart grand prix, the first Miss Harlem contest, and concerts featuring soul, gospel, calypso, and Puerto Rican music". In 1968, the second annual Festival included a series of music concerts featuring high profile figures, including Count Basie, Bobby "Blue" Bland, Tito Puente, and Mahalia Jackson. It was filmed by documentary maker Hal Tulchin, and excerpts were broadcast on WNEW-TV in New York.

== 1969 Harlem Cultural Festival ==
Lawrence also hosted and directed the 1969 festival, held in Mount Morris Park on Sundays at 3 p.m. from June 29 to August 24, 1969. Sponsors included Maxwell House Coffee, and what was then the Parks, Recreation, and Cultural Affairs Division of the City of New York (later separated into Parks and Recreation and Cultural Affairs). Lawrence secured a wide range of performers including Nina Simone, B.B. King, Sly and the Family Stone, Chuck Jackson, Abbey Lincoln & Max Roach, the 5th Dimension, David Ruffin, Hugh Masakela, Gladys Knight & the Pips, Stevie Wonder, Mahalia Jackson, Mongo Santamaria, Ray Barretto, and Moms Mabley, among many others. The Woodstock rock festival also took place in August 1969, and the Harlem festival then became known informally as the "Black Woodstock".

The Festival also involved the participation of community activists and civic leaders including Jesse Jackson. The series of six free concerts had a combined attendance of nearly 300,000. For the concert featuring Sly and the Family Stone on June 29, 1969, the New York City Police Department (NYPD) refused to provide security, and it was instead provided by members of the Black Panther Party.

Film maker Hal Tulchin used five portable video cameras to record over 40 hours of footage of the Festival. Tulchin, his crew, and his video equipment did not capture the final week of the festival because they were hired away to shoot pilot episodes for Sesame Street. One of the acts they missed was the outdoor performance of the vocal group Listen My Brother which included a young Luther Vandross before he was famous. However, Listen My Brother was soon brought into the Sesame Street studios to sing about counting – this footage survives.

Although the majority of Tulchin's video tape of the Harlem Cultural Festival was not released, CBS broadcast a one-hour special on July 28, 1969, featuring the 5th Dimension, the Chambers Brothers, and Max Roach with Abbey Lincoln. A second hour-long special followed on September 16 on ABC, featuring Mahalia Jackson, the Staple Singers, and Reverend Jesse Jackson. A further five TV specials were announced at the time, but do not appear to have been broadcast.

=== Summer of Soul ===
Several attempts were made to turn Hal Tulchin's videos into a television special or film, including one by Tulchin in 1969 and another in 2004 that ended when funding ran out. During this period, Tulchin named the project Black Woodstock in the hope of gaining further interest. In 2019, it was announced in numerous outlets that Ahmir "Questlove" Thompson would make his directorial debut with Summer of Soul (...Or, When the Revolution Could Not Be Televised), a feature documentary about the Harlem Cultural Festival. Questlove's film was released on July 2, 2021, in theaters and on Hulu to critical acclaim. According to Metacritic, which assigned a weighted average score of 96 out of 100 based on 38 critics, the film received "universal acclaim". On March 27, 2022, Summer of Soul won the Best Documentary award at the 94th Academy Awards.

=== 50th anniversary festival ===
A 50th Year Anniversary celebration of the 1969 Harlem Cultural Festival took place August 14–17, 2019, in Harlem, hosted by Future x Sounds and City Parks Foundation Summerstage. The event featured musical performances by Talib Kweli, Cory Henry, Alice Smith, Georgia Anne Muldrow, Keyon Harrold, Braxton Cook, Freddie Stone (who performed at the original event), George "Spanky" McCurdy, Nate Jones On Bass, was curated and co-produced by Neal Ludevig and was musically directed by Igmar Thomas. The event also featured conversations with Jamal Joseph, Felipe Luciano, Gale Brewer, Toni Blackman, Juma Sultan, and Voza Rivers, among many others, at Harlem Stage and the Schomburg.

== Proposed later events ==
Tony Lawrence made plans for further festivals, aiming to turn the Harlem festival into an international touring enterprise, and made recordings aimed at promoting the festivals. However, a shortage of funding meant that the plans failed to materialize. In 1972, Lawrence made a series of allegations in the Amsterdam News against two of his former legal and business partners, claiming financial irregularities. He took legal action against them for fraud, and also claimed that an attempt had been made on his life and that it remained under threat from the Mafia. The Amsterdam News noted that Lawrence's claims were unsubstantiated, and, at the urging of Shirley Chisholm and Charles Rangel, the legal action was dropped. Lawrence also made claims against Tulchin over ownership of the recordings, and attempted to set up his own film company, Uganda Productions. Lawrence attempted to organize further, smaller, versions of the Harlem Cultural Festival in 1973 and 1974, and to set up an International Harlem Cultural Festival, but the plans did not proceed.

== See also ==
- List of historic rock festivals
- List of festivals in the United States
- List of blues festivals
