= Across the Board =

1959 American television game show

- Directed by: Hal Tulchin
- Presented by: Ted Brown
- Announcer: George Ansbro
- Country of origin: United States

Production
- Production locations: Elysee Theatre, 202 West 58th Street, New York City
- Running time: 30 minutes

Original release
- Network: ABC
- Release: June 1 – October 9, 1959

Across the Board is an American crossword puzzle–based game show that aired on ABC for four months in 1959. Contestants solve a crossword whose answers are clued by both a phrase and an image. The show, recorded in New York City, was directed by Hal Tulchin and hosted by Ted Brown. It premiered to negative reviews.

== Gameplay ==
Two contestants, one a returning champion, compete to fill in the same crossword grid on a large mechanical board. Clues are given one at a time, in two parts: a verbal definition, then a cartoon hint drawn in real time from behind a translucent rice paper screen. For example, the first episode used the clue [A kind of pipe], plus a drawing of a Scotsman, for the answer BAG (as in bagpipes).

Contestants may buzz in at any time to lock out the opponent and guess the answer aloud. A correct response is displayed on the board and is worth a point per letter; an incorrect response gives the opponent a chance to guess and score points. As the grid fills in, it is possible for contestants to work the crosses and buzz in quickly with just half a clue.

The contestant with more points wins; a pair of cars is the prize for the unlikely contestant who fills all the squares in a grid singlehandedly.

== Development, production, and broadcast history ==
Hal Tulchin, a pioneer in videotaping and the director of Across the Board, credited himself with the idea for the format, though it was not the first crossword puzzle game show. The concept was pitched to ABC with the help of producers Bob Stivers and Joseph Cates. ABC ran Across the Board weekdays from noon to 12:30 p.m. from June 1 to October 9, 1959.

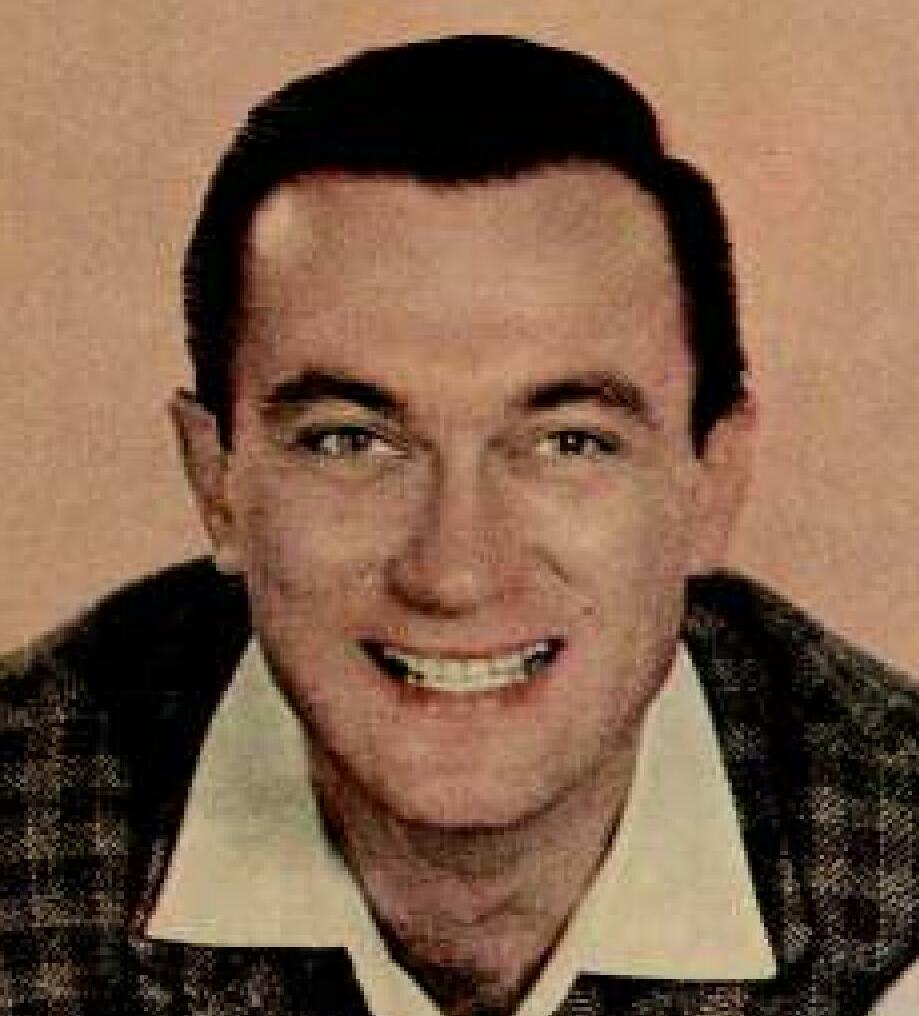
Emcee Ted Brown (pictured in 1956) kept the show light-hearted.

Radio personalities Ted Brown and George Ansbro emceed and announced the show respectively. Joseph Cates's brother Gilbert, a producer for the show, did the clue illustrations from off screen. Unlike most of ABC's daytime programming at the time, Across the Board was pre-recorded rather than live because of the director's expertise in videotape. Nevertheless, the tapings had no retakes and the editing was minimal (at the time, editing videotape involved using a microscope). Tapings took place at the Elysee Theatre on West 58th Street in Manhattan, New York City.

The show had an air of levity. Producers preferred quirky contestants. Clues often featured gags in the spirit of the Broadway revue Hellzapoppin (1938). Brown was light-hearted, bantering with contestants and telling jokes; a self-admitted bad speller, he read the answers off palmed cards. A man once competed in drag and took off his wig at the end of the show, but ABC scrapped the episode.

== Reception ==
United Press television critic William Ewald panned the show in a review of the first two episodes, complaining that the answers were too easy and calling it a good fit for the "dull, witless, commonplace" land of daytime television. (Note: Ewald's "absurdly easy" answers from the first episode—ADE, BAG, BAT, FILE, and TAR; and those answers that "stepped up to the level of stupidity" in the second—IDLE, MOLAR, NEAR, and TERSE.) The Philadelphia Inquirer critic Harry Harris found the first episode's humor flat and the mechanics derivative of other game shows, such as Dotto (guessing words from drawings) and Name That Tune (using buzzers). Newsday's Barbara Delatiner declared the show an inferior copy of another crossword game show from New York City, WNTA-TV's Double Cross.

== See also ==
- The Cross-Wits, crossword game show of 1975–1980
