= Marcus Garvey Park =

Public park in Manhattan, New York

- Mount Morris Park
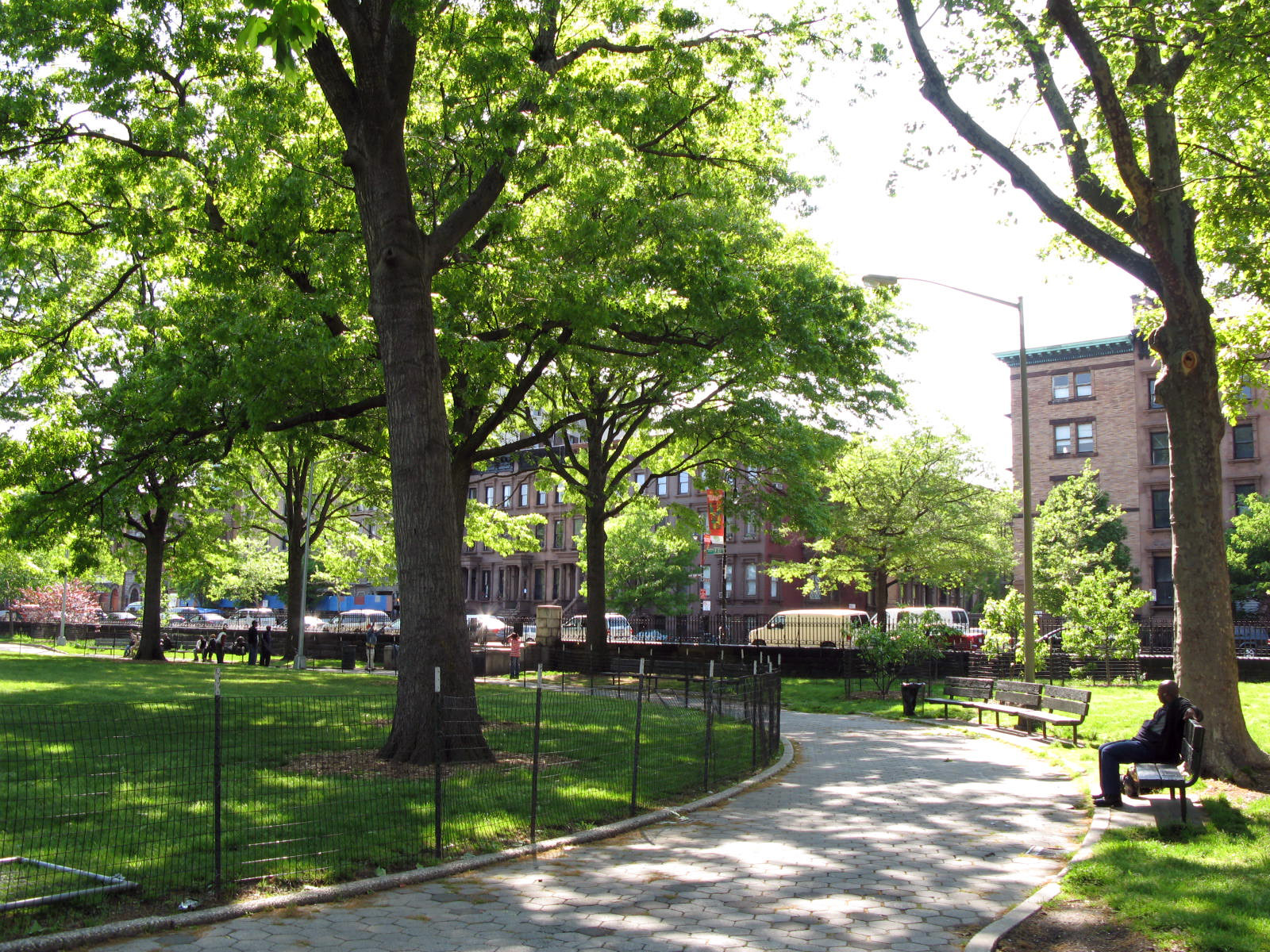
- View in the park looking west
- Interactive map of Marcus Garvey Park
- Location: Harlem/East Harlem, Manhattan
- Nearest city: New York City
- Coordinates: 40°48′16″N 73°56′37″W
- Area: 20.16 acres (8.16 ha)
- Created: 1840
- Operator: New York City Department of Parks and Recreation
- Designation
- Marcus Garvey Park
- U.S. National Register of Historic Places
- New York State Register of Historic Places
- Location within Manhattan Location within New York City Location within New York
- Location: Mount Morris Park West, 120th St, Madison Ave, 124th Street, New York, New York
- Area: 19.64 acres (7.95 ha)
- NRHP reference No.: 100011764
- NYSRHP No.: 06101.023483

Significant dates
- Added to NRHP: April 28, 2025
- Designated NYSRHP: March 13, 2025

Marcus Garvey Park (formerly and also named Mount Morris Park) is a 20.16-acre (81,600 m^{2}) park on the border between the Harlem and East Harlem neighborhoods of Manhattan, New York City. The park, centered on a massive and steep outcropping of schist, interrupts the flow of Fifth Avenue traffic, (Note: Centered on Fifth Avenue on the south perimeter of the park stand wrought iron gates bearing the medallion "MB".) which is routed around the park via Mount Morris Park West. The park is also bounded by 120th Street to the south, 124th Street to the north, and Madison Avenue to the east.

Created in 1840, the park was originally named for Robert Morris, then the mayor of New York City. It was renamed for Black activist and businessman Marcus Garvey in 1973. Marcus Garvey Park contains flat lawns and playing fields surrounding the schist outcropping, as well as the Harlem Fire Watchtower, a New York City-designated landmark. It is operated and maintained by the New York City Department of Parks and Recreation. The park was listed on the National Register of Historic Places in 2025.

== Etymology ==
Early Dutch settlers called the hill Slang Berg, or Snake Hill. This name was commonly used before the park was created. When the park was opened to the public in 1840, the park was named after the newly elected Mayor of New York City, Robert Morris, although the origin of this name is not certain.

In 1970, the Community Thing and other activist groups suggested naming the park for Marcus Garvey, a publisher, journalist, entrepreneur, activist for black nationalism, and founder of the Universal Negro Improvement Association and African Communities League (UNIA-ACL). They also asked that a portion of the newly built recreation center contain a Garvey Museum. That August, the African Nationalist Activist Movement called for a Marcus Garvey Day celebration, and The New York Times noted that the park was already being "called Garvey Memorial Park by some persons." More than 1,000 reportedly attended the celebration in the park. City Council voted to officially rename the park to Marcus Garvey Memorial Park in 1973, during the same vote in which Welfare Island was renamed Roosevelt Island. The portion of Fifth Avenue in Harlem was also proposed to be renamed Marcus Garvey Boulevard by advocates and the two surrounding Community Boards in 1988, but this effort ultimately failed amid complaints from residents who feared that the street would lose its reputation and lead to confusion.

== History ==
=== Site ===
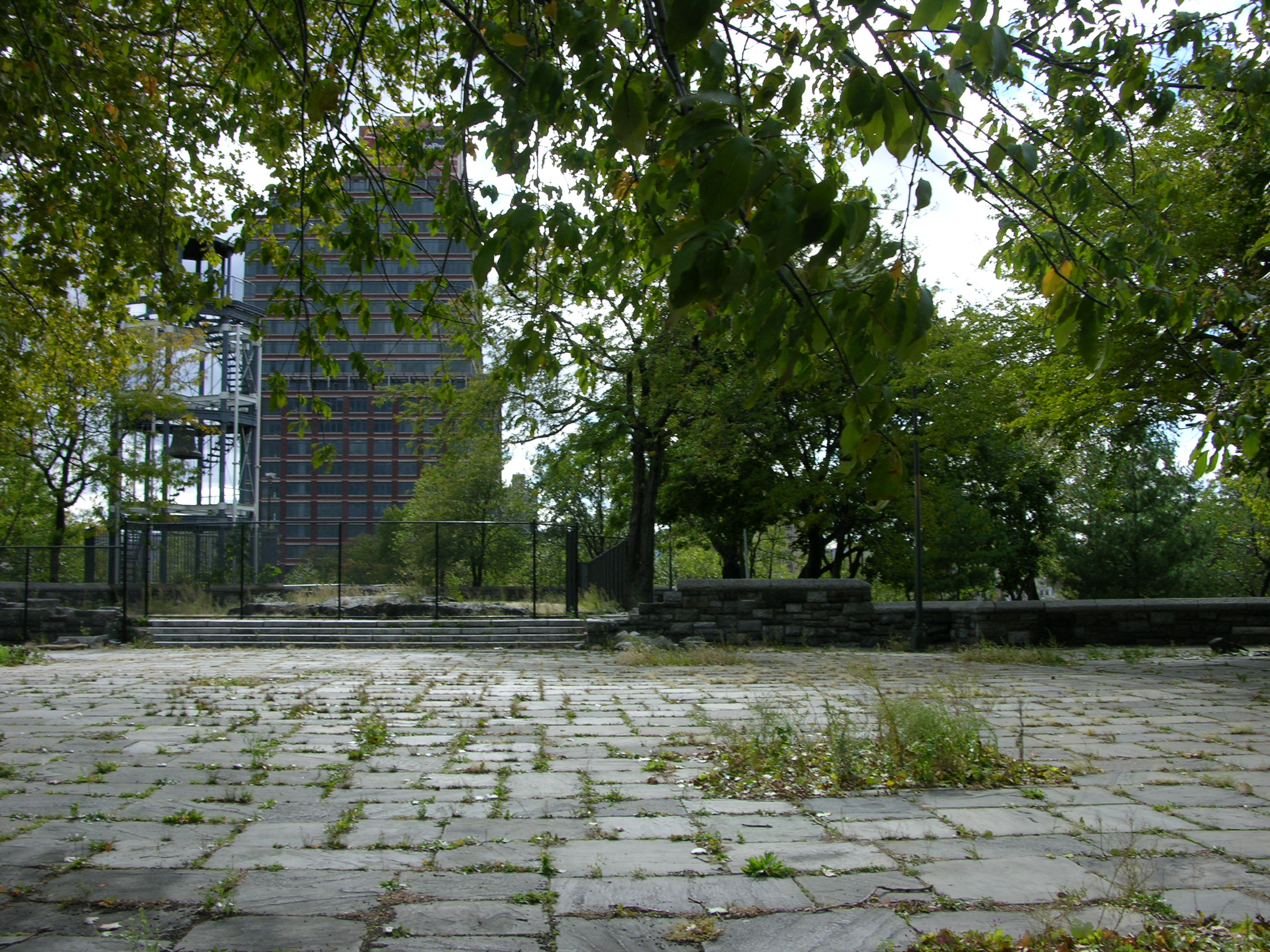
On top of the mount in Marcus Garvey Park, fire watchtower is seen on the left

Before the European settlements, the rocky hill of Manhattan mica-schist was used by the Native Americans as a lookout station to see over the entire island. The nearness of the Harlem River made Slang Berg a militarily strategic location.

During the American Revolutionary War, Hessian soldiers "mounted a battery" at the hill "to command the mouth of the Harlem River". Despite the 18th-century local prominence of the Gouverneur Morris family, (Note: "On Harlem Heights, Colonel Roger Morris and his wife Mary Philpse, were building Mount Morris, a beautiful Georgian showplace commanding a view down the length of Manhattan." The house exists as the Morris-Jumel Mansion, sometimes also called "Mount Morris".) the name "Mount Morris" for the rocky formation, one of two the Dutch called the Ronde Gerbergte is of 19th-century origin:

One is an abrupt wooded eminence, by modern innovation styled Mount Morris, but which the Dutch called Slang Berg, or Snake Hill, from the reptile tribes that infested its cleft rocks and underbrush even within memory of the living. Southerly from it the gneiss rock crops out in huge, disordered masses. A little way to the right, as seen from McGown's Pass to the south, is ... a lesser height or ridge, and which to the inhabitants came to be known as the Little Hill.

Little Hill was leveled when the right-of-way of the Park Avenue main line was graded for the New York and Harlem Railroad, following the present route of Park Avenue.

=== Construction ===
On September 4, 1839, a 20-acre (81,000 m^{2}) residential square, on land which was formerly a race track for horses, out of 173 acres (0.70 km^{2}) of a land grant farm owned by the Benson family, was set aside. The square was relocated from the Commissioners' Plan of 1811, which had planned for a square in the neighborhood, in order to take advantage of the rugged topography that stood squarely in the path of Fifth Avenue, which was being extended north of Central Park. "Mount Morris Square" was officially opened December 1, 1840.

=== Usage ===
The new square that existed on paper remained unimproved for decades. It was landscaped in 1869, to a plan by the City surveyor Ignaz Pilat, for which the Central Park Commission allocated $15,000. Walks were graded and the sloping path to the summit was constructed; by the next spring, The New York Times predicted, "croquet playing, decent picnic parties, and a band of music will attract not only the inhabitants of Harlem, but those of New-York". Blocks of the original rusticated retaining walls, akin to the stonework that surrounds Central Park, can still be seen.

Music has been played in the park since its beginnings, with the Parks Department promoting performances in 1872 and 1893. By 1900 a refreshment booth had been built at the 120th Street and Madison Avenue entrance to the park. A long vehicular tunnel to send Fifth Avenue through the center of the rock was proposed by Manhattan Borough President Samuel Levy and approved by Robert Moses in 1936. It was never built.

In the summer of 1969, the park was the site of the Harlem Cultural Festival, a series of concerts that came to be known as "Black Woodstock," and the subject of the 2021 documentary "Summer of Soul."

== Features ==
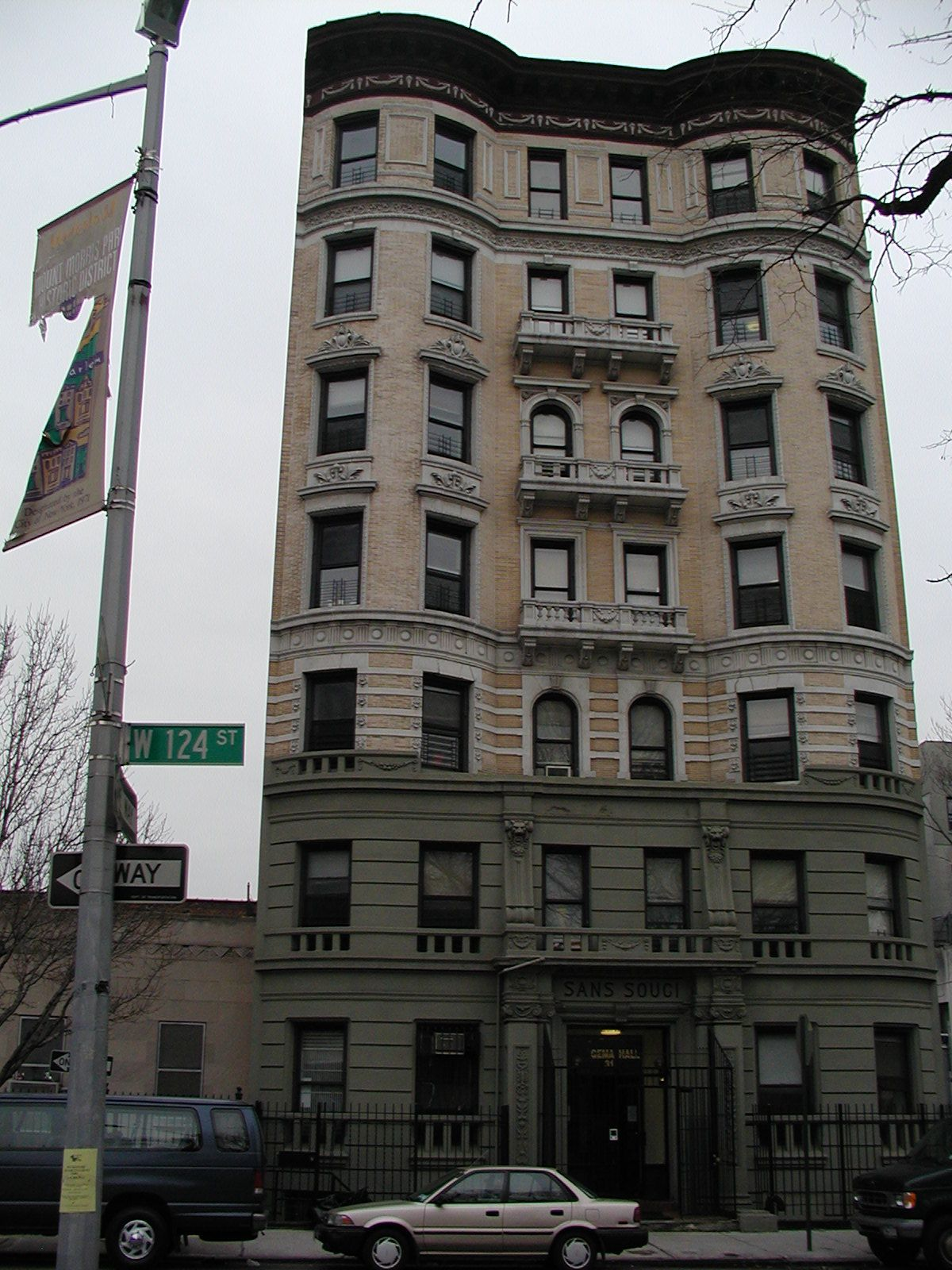
Apartment building on 124th Street facing Marcus Garvey Park

=== Watchtower ===
The Harlem Fire Watchtower was designed by Julius H. Kroehl and erected in 1855–57 of cast iron. The tower was fitted with a 10,000 pound bell cast by Jones & Hitchcock. The watchtower allowed observers to use the natural elevation of the park and the added height of the structure to search for fires, in an era when most buildings were made of wood. The 47-foot (14 m) cast-iron tower is the only one to survive of eleven that had been constructed in the city. It was designated as a city landmark in 1967 and added to the National Register of Historic Places in 1976. The watchtower, still bearing its bell, is located at the center of the park on an artificial plateau called The Acropolis.

=== Facilities ===
Facilities in the park include the Pelham Fritz Recreation Center and the Richard Rodgers Amphitheater (both located on the west side of the park at 122nd Street), and Swimming Pool (open in summer) on the north side of the park, and two playgrounds designed for infants and disabled children, which were built in 1993. A Little League baseball field occupies the southwest corner of the park. A dog run with wood chip footing is located on the southeast corner of the park.

Much of the rusticated stonework stairs and walling has been patched with concrete; capstones have been dislodged by vandals. Sections of the upper part are closed off with chainlink fencing.

Most of the park closes at 10 pm; the upper section closes earlier, at dusk.

== See also ==
- List of New York City parks
- Charlie Parker Jazz Festival
- City Parks Foundation
- Mount Morris Park Historic District
