= Tony Lawrence (soccer) =

English-born Canadian soccer player

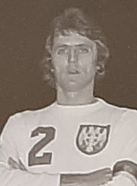
- Lawrence in 1974

Personal information
- Full name: Anthony Lawrence
- Date of birth: 1 February 1946 (age 80)
- Place of birth: London, England
- Height: 5 ft 10 in (1.78 m)
- Position: Midfielder

Senior career*
| Years | Team | Apps | (Gls) |
| 1970 | Toronto Emerald | | |
| 1971–1972 | Toronto Ukraina | | |
| 1976 | Serbian White Eagles | | |
| 1976 | Toronto Italia | | |

International career
| 1976 | Canada Olympic | 2 | (0) |
- * Club domestic league appearances and goals

Anthony Lawrence (born 1 February 1946) is a Canadian former soccer player who competed at the 1976 Summer Olympics.

In 1970, Lawrence played in the Toronto and District Soccer League with Toronto Emerald. Lawrence played in the National Soccer League in 1971 with Toronto Ukraina. He re-signed with Ukraina for the 1972 season. In 1976, he signed with the Serbian White Eagles. After a pay dispute with the White Eagles he was granted his release from his contract. He played with league rivals Toronto Italia for the remainder of the 1976 season.
