= 5th Critics' Choice Documentary Awards =

Critics' Choice Documentary Awards 2020

- Date: November 16, 2020
- Site: Virtual
- Official website: www.criticschoice.com

The 5th Critics' Choice Documentary Awards were presented on November 16, 2020, honoring the finest achievements in documentary filmmaking and non-fiction television; due to the COVID-19 pandemic the ceremony was held via online. The nominees were announced on October 26, 2020, with Crip Camp: A Disability Revolution, Gunda and Mr. Soul! leading the nominations with five.

== Winners and nominees ==
Best Documentary Feature: Dick Johnson Is Dead (Netflix); Athlete A (Netflix); Belushi (Showtime); Crip Camp: A Disability Revolution (Netflix); Feels Good Man (Wavelength Productions/PBS Independent Lens); The Fight (Magnolia Pictures); The Go-Go's (Showtime); Gunda (Neon); Mr. Soul! (Shoes in the Bed Productions); My Octopus Teacher (Netflix); The Painter and the Thief (Neon); A Secret Love (Netflix); The Social Dilemma (Netflix); Time (Amazon Studios)	Best Director: Kirsten Johnson – Dick Johnson Is Dead; Garrett Bradley – Time; Bonni Cohen and Jon Shenk – Athlete A; Victor Kossakovsky – Gunda; James Lebrecht and Nicole Newnham – Crip Camp: A Disability Revolution; Dawn Porter – John Lewis: Good Trouble; Benjamin Ree – The Painter and the Thief
Best First Documentary Feature: Melissa Haizlip – Mr. Soul!; Robert S. Bader – Ali & Cavett: The Tale of the Tapes; Chris Bolan – A Secret Love; Arthur Jones – Feels Good Man; Elizabeth Leiter and Kim Woodard – Jane Goodall: The Hope; Elizabeth Lo – Stray; Sasha Joseph Neulinger – Rewind	Best Narration: David Attenborough: A Life on Our Planet – David Attenborough, narrator and writer; Dick Johnson Is Dead – Kirsten Johnson, narrator and writer; Fireball: Visitors from Darker Worlds – Werner Herzog, narrator and writer; Mr. Soul! – Blair Underwood, narrator; Ellis Haizlip, writer; My Octopus Teacher – Craig Foster, narrator and writer; Time – Fox Rich, narrator and writer; Totally Under Control – Alex Gibney, narrator and writer
Best Archival Documentary: MLK/FBI (Field of Vision/IFC Films); Ali & Cavett: The Tale of the Tapes (HBO); Belushi (Showtime); Class Action Park (HBO Max); Crip Camp: A Disability Revolution (Netflix); Mr. Soul! (Shoes in the Bed Productions); Spaceship Earth (Neon)	Best Short Documentary: St. Louis Superman (MTV Documentary Films); Blackfeet Boxing: Not Invisible (ESPN); The Claudia Kishi Club (Netflix); Crescendo! (Quibi); Elevator Pitch (Field of Vision); Hunger Ward (Spin Film/Vulcan Productions/RYOT Films); Into the Fire (National Geographic); My Father the Mover (MTV Documentary Films); The Rifleman (Field of Vision); The Speed Cubers (Netflix)
Best Political Documentary: Boys State (Apple); All In: The Fight for Democracy (Amazon Studios); John Lewis: Good Trouble (Magnolia Pictures); MLK/FBI (Field of Vision/IFC Films); The Social Dilemma (Netflix); Totally Under Control (Neon); The Way I See It (Focus Features)	Best Sports Documentary: Ali & Cavett: The Tale of the Tapes (HBO); Athlete A (Netflix); Be Water (ESPN); A Most Beautiful Thing (50 Eggs Films); Red Penguins (Universal Pictures); Rising Phoenix (Netflix); You Cannot Kill David Arquette (Super LTD)
Best Historical/Biographical Documentary: John Lewis: Good Trouble (Magnolia Pictures); Belushi (Showtime); Crip Camp: A Disability Revolution (Netflix); Howard (Disney+); Mr. Soul! (Shoes in the Bed Production); Mucho Mucho Amor: The Legend of Walter Mercado (Netflix); Natalie Wood: What Remains Behind (HBO)	Best Science/Nature Documentary: My Octopus Teacher (Netflix); Coded Bias (7th Empire Media/PBS Independent Lens); Fantastic Fungi (Moving Art); Gunda (Neon); I Am Greta (Hulu); The Last Ice (National Geographic); Spaceship Earth (Neon)
Best Music Documentary: Beastie Boys Story (Apple); The Go-Go's (Showtime); Crock of Gold: A Few Rounds with Shane MacGowan (Magnolia Pictures); Laurel Canyon (Epix); Once Were Brothers: Robbie Robertson and the Band (Magnolia Pictures); Other Music (Factory 25); Zappa (Magnolia Pictures)	Best Score: Marco Beltrami, Brandon Roberts and Buck Sanders – The Way I See It; Ari Balouzian and Ryan Hope – Feels Good Man; Tyler Durham, Sven Faulconer and Xander Rodzinski – The Last Ice; Peter Nashel and Brian Deming – Totally Under Control; Daniel Pemberton – Rising Phoenix; Jeff Tweedy – Long Gone Summer; Jeff Tweedy, Spencer Tweedy and Sammy Tweedy – Showbiz Kids
Best Cinematography: Roger Horrocks – My Octopus Teacher; Michael Dweck and Gregory Kershaw – The Truffle Hunters; Kirsten Johnson – Dick Johnson Is Dead; Victor Kossakovsky and Egil Håskjold Larsen, Gunda (Neon); Scott Ressler, Neil Gelinas and Stefan Wiesen – The Last Ice; Gianfranco Rosi – Notturno; Ruben Woodin Dechamps – The Reason I Jump	Best Editing: Lindy Jankura and Alex Keipper – Totally Under Control; Don Bernier – Athlete A; Eli Despres, Greg Finton and Kim Roberts – The Fight; Helen Kearns – Assassins; Victor Kossakovsky and Ainara Vera – Gunda; Eileen Meyer and Andrew Gersh – Crip Camp: A Disability Revolution; Charlotte Munch Bengtsen – The Truffle Hunters
Most Compelling Living Subject of a Documentary: Dr. Rick Bright – Totally Under Control; Steven Garza – Boys State; The Go-Go's – The Go-Go's; Judith Heumann – Crip Camp: A Disability Revolution; Dick Johnson – Dick Johnson Is Dead; Maggie Nichols, Rachael Denhollander, Jamie Dantzscher – Athlete A; Fox Rich – Time; Pete Souza – The Way I See It; Taylor Swift – Miss Americana; Greta Thunberg – I Am Greta

== Films by multiple nominations and wins ==
The following films received multiple nominations:

Nominations	Film
6	Crip Camp: A Disability Revolution
5	Mr. Soul!
5	Dick Johnson Is Dead
5	Gunda
5	Totally Under Control
5	Athlete A
4	My Octopus Teacher
4	Time
3	Feels Good Man
3	The Go-Go's
3	Belushi
3	The Way I See It
3	Ali & Cavett: The Tale of the Tapes
3	The Last Ice
3	John Lewis: Good Trouble
2	Rising Phoenix
2	The Fight
2	The Truffle Hunters
2	MLK/FBI
2	Boys State
2	Spaceship Earth
2	I Am Greta
2	A Secret Love
2	The Social Dilemma
2	The Painter and the Thief

The following films received multiple awards:

Wins	Film
3	Dick Johnson Is Dead
2	My Octopus Teacher
2	The Go-Go's
2	Athlete A
2	The Way I See It
2	Totally Under Control
2	Boys State

== See also ==
- 93rd Academy Awards
