= Soul! =

American television series

- Created by: Ellis Haizlip
- Country of origin: United States
- Original language: English
- No. of seasons: 6
- No. of episodes: 53

Production
- Production company: WNDT/WNET

Original release
- Network: NET/PBS
- Release: September 12, 1968 – March 7, 1973

Soul! (also stylized in uppercase) is a performance/variety television program that showcased African American music, dance and literature in the late 1960s and early 1970s. It was produced by New York City public television station WNDT (later rebranded as WNET during its run), and distributed by NET and its successor PBS.

The show was among the 67 programs purged in the 1974 formation of the Station Program Cooperative by PBS, along with WGBH-TV's The Advocates.

== Sponsor ==
The program was funded in part by the Ford Foundation and the Corporation for Public Broadcasting, who characterized it in 1970 as "the only nationally televised weekly series oriented to the black community and produced by blacks." Briefly during 1971 and 1972, the show was sponsored in part by Interdisciplinary Metropolitan Systems, who provided major funding for the series.

== Line-up ==
WNDT aired the first in a series of 39 one-hour programs entitled Soul! on Thursday, September 12, 1968. The program was video-taped inside WNDT's then-West 55th Street Studios in Manhattan. The original co-hosts were noted black Harvard psychologist Alvin Poussaint and educator Loretta Long (who, one year later, took on the role of Susan Robinson on Sesame Street). Poussaint is a noted author, public- speaker, and television consultant and is well known for his research on racism's effect in the black community. His work in psychology is influenced greatly by the civil rights movement in the South, which he joined in 1965.

The premiere broadcast featured singer Barbara Acklin, Patti LaBelle and the Bluebelles (Nona Hendryx and Sarah Dash), actress-singer Novella Nelson, Billy Taylor, singing group the Vibrations, gospel musician Pearl Williams Jones, and comedian Irwin C. Watson. Poussaint and Long subsequently hosted four following editions.

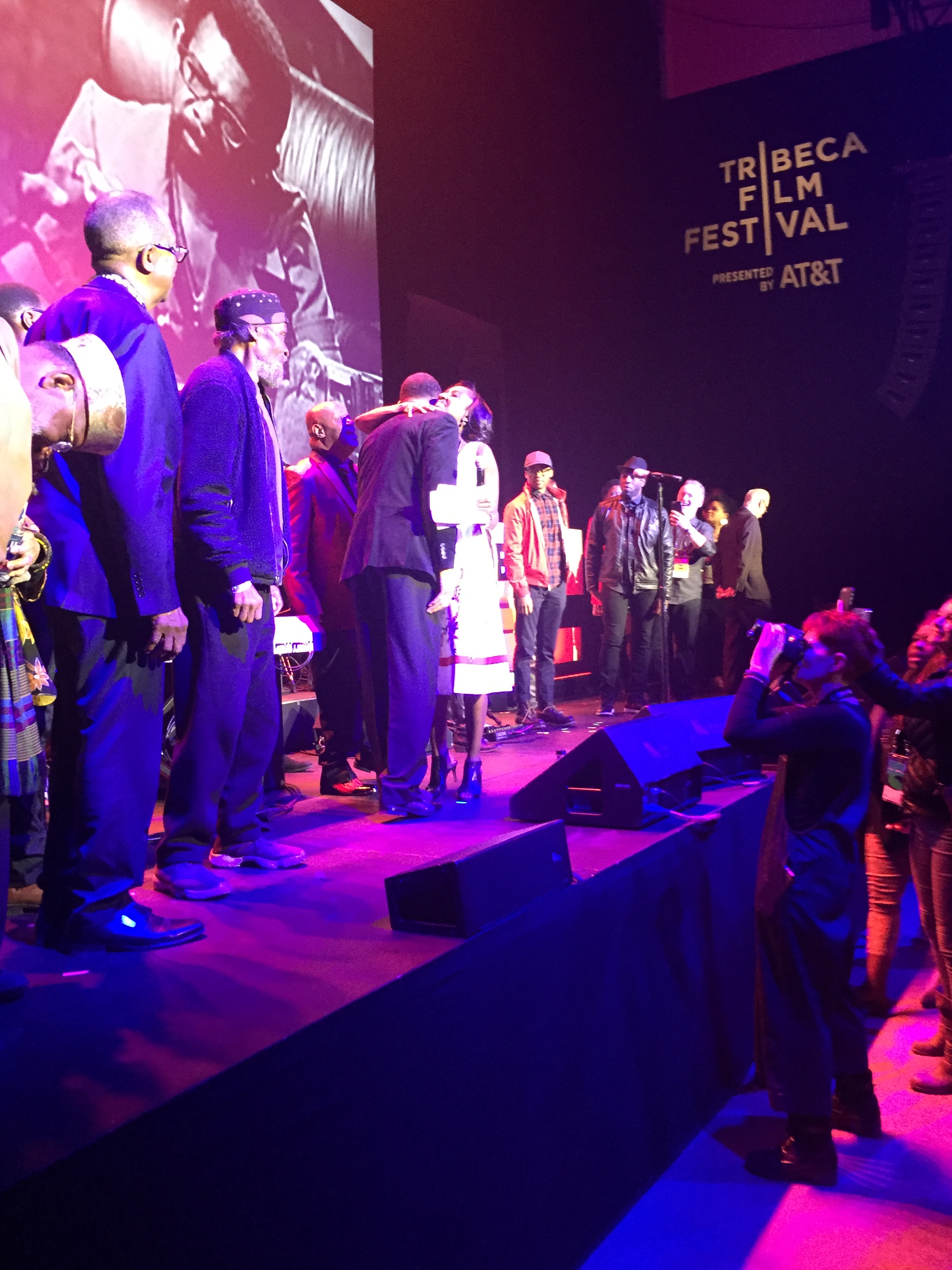
Mr. SOUL! The Movie Premiered at The Tribeca Film Festival

For the edition airing on October 24, Poussaint was replaced by series creator Ellis Haizlip, an openly gay African American man, closely associated with the Black Arts Movement. Haizlip and Long co-host Soul! until December 5, after which Haizlip became its sole host. Poet Nikki Giovanni was also a frequent guest host. Soul! ended on March 7, 1973.

Among the musical guests who appeared were Stevie Wonder, Earth, Wind, and Fire, the Dells, Ashford and Simpson, Al Green, Tito Puente, Bill Withers, McCoy Tyner, Max Roach, Gladys Knight & the Pips, The Delfonics, The Spinners, Kool & The Gang, Mandrill, and Black Ivory, as well as African performers Hugh Masekela and Miriam Makeba. Other guests included boxer Muhammad Ali, Nation of Islam leader Louis Farrakhan, minister (and later politician) Jesse Jackson, actor/singer Harry Belafonte, actor Sidney Poitier, and Kathleen Cleaver (wife of activist Eldridge Cleaver). Poet Mae Jackson and poetry collective The Last Poets also performed.

== Cultural impact ==
Its viewership in the African American community was enormous: a 1968 Harris poll estimated that more than 65% of African American households with access to the show watched it on a regular basis. In 1970 it was carried by 72 public television stations.

Gayle Wald writes that "Soul! offered viewers radical ways of imagining—of hearing, feeling, and seeing—black community. Musically speaking, Soul! refused the division of black arts into high and low culture: the music of the concert hall versus the music of the Apollo. Soul! made room for both…"

Ivan Cury was staff director until 1970, when Stan Lathan (later a veteran television director and father of actress Sanaa Lathan) assumed the position. Producers included writer Alonzo Brown and actress Anna Marie Horsford (later known for her roles on television series Amen and The Wayans Bros.). Occasional host Loretta Greene later appeared in the movies Black Girl and Solomon Northup's Odyssey, the original version of 12 Years a Slave.

On April 22, 2018, Mr. SOUL! - a documentary film about Haizlip directed, produced and written by his niece Melissa Haizlip, premiered at New York City's Tribeca Film Festival. The award-winning film was released in limited theaters and virtual cinemas on August 28, 2020. As of December 2020, the film has won 19 awards, including 14 film festival awards. The documentary premiered on PBS on February 22, 2021.
