= Critics Choice Documentary Award for Best Music Documentary =

Critics’ Choice Award for Best Music Documentary
- Awarded for: Best music documentary
- Country: United States
- Presented by: Critics Choice Association
- First award: 2016

The Critics' Choice Documentary Award for Best Music Documentary is an accolade presented annually by the Critics Choice Association (CCA) as part of the Critics' Choice Documentary Awards. Established in 2016, the award honors exceptional achievement in music-related documentary filmmaking. It is one of the categories recognizing outstanding documentaries released theatrically, on television, or across streaming platforms. The Critics Choice Documentary Awards themselves were launched in 2016.

== Winners and nominees ==
Table key
indicates the winner

=== 2010s ===
| Year | Director(s) | Film | Ref. |
|---|---|---|---|
| 2016 (1st) | Ron Howard | The Beatles: Eight Days a Week | |
| 2016 (1st) | Jim Jarmusch | Gimme Danger | |
| 2016 (1st) | Morgan Neville | Music of Strangers: Yo-Yo Ma and the Silk Road Ensemble | |
| 2016 (1st) | Barbara Kopple | Miss Sharon Jones! | |
| 2016 (1st) | Stephen Kijak | We Are X | |
| 2016 (1st) | Ido Haar | Presenting Princess Shaw | |
| 2017 (2nd) | Chris Perkel | Clive Davis: The Soundtrack of Our Lives | |
| 2017 (2nd) | Amir Bar-Lev | Long Strange Trip | |
| 2017 (2nd) | Kasper Collin | I Called Him Morgan | |
| 2017 (2nd) | Turner Ross and Bill Ross IV | Contemporary Color | |
| 2017 (2nd) | Colin Hanks | Eagles of Death Metal: Nos Amis (Our Friends) | |
| 2017 (2nd) | Catherine Bainbridge | Rumble: The Indians Who Rocked the World | |
| 2018 (3rd) | Alan Hicks; Rashida Jones | Quincy | |
| 2018 (3rd) | Kevin Macdonald | Whitney | |
| 2018 (3rd) | Francis Whately | David Bowie: The Last Five Years | |
| 2018 (3rd) | Kevin Kerslake | Bad Reputation | |
| 2018 (3rd) | Thom Zimny | Elvis Presley: The Searcher | |
| 2018 (3rd) | Stephen Nomura Schible | Ryuichi Sakamoto: Coda | |
| 2018 (3rd) | Stephen Kijak | If I Leave Here Tomorrow: A Film About Lynyrd Skynyrd | |
| 2019 (4th) | Rob Epstein; Jeffrey Friedman | Linda Ronstadt: The Sound of My Voice | |
| 2019 (4th) | Alan Elliott; Sydney Pollack | Amazing Grace | |
| 2019 (4th) | Martin Scorsese | Rolling Thunder Revue: A Bob Dylan Story by Martin Scorsese | |
| 2019 (4th) | A. J. Eaton | David Crosby: Remember My Name | |
| 2019 (4th) | Stanley Nelson Jr. | Miles Davis: Birth of the Cool | |
| 2019 (4th) | Ron Howard | Pavarotti | |
| 2019 (4th) | Bruce Springsteen; Thom Zimny | Western Stars | |

=== 2020s ===
| Year | Director(s) | Film | Ref. |
|---|---|---|---|
| 2020 (5th) | Spike Jonze | Beastie Boys Story | |
| 2020 (5th) | Alison Ellwood | The Go-Go's | |
| 2020 (5th) | Julien Temple | Crock of Gold: A Few Rounds with Shane MacGowan | |
| 2020 (5th) | Lisa Cholodenko | Laurel Canyon | |
| 2020 (5th) | Daniel Roher | Once Were Brothers: Robbie Robertson and the Band | |
| 2020 (5th) | Alex Winter | Zappa | |
| 2020 (5th) | Puloma Basu; Rob Hatch-Miller | Other Music | |
| 2021 (6th) | Questlove | Summer of Soul | |
| 2021 (6th) | R. J. Cutler | Billie Eilish: The World's a Little Blurry | |
| 2021 (6th) | Todd Haynes | The Velvet Underground | |
| 2021 (6th) | Edgar Wright | The Sparks Brothers | |
| 2021 (6th) | Daniel Lindsay; T. J. Martin | Tina | |
| 2021 (6th) | Penny Lane | Listening to Kenny G | |
| 2021 (6th) | Sacha Jenkins | Bitchin': The Sound and Fury of Rick James | |
| 2022 (7th) | Peter Jackson | The Beatles: Get Back | |
| 2022 (7th) | Brett Morgen | Moonage Daydream | |
| 2022 (7th) | Daniel Geller; Dayna Goldfine | Hallelujah: Leonard Cohen, A Journey, A Song | |
| 2022 (7th) | Sacha Jenkins | Louis Armstrong's Black & Blues | |
| 2022 (7th) | Kathryn Ferguson | Nothing Compares | |
| 2022 (7th) | Mary McCartney | If These Walls Could Sing | |
| 2022 (7th) | Kathlyn Horan | The Return of Tanya Tucker: Featuring Brandi Carlile | |
| 2023 (8th) | Matthew Heineman | American Symphony | |
| 2023 (8th) | Sam Wrench | Taylor Swift: The Eras Tour | |
| 2023 (8th) | Lisa Cortés | Little Richard: I Am Everything | |
| 2023 (8th) | John Scheinfeld | What the Hell Happened to Blood, Sweat & Tears? | |
| 2023 (8th) | Rudy Valdez | Carlos | |
| 2023 (8th) | Hannah Beachler; Dream Hampton; Raeshem Nijhon; Giselle Bailey; Carri Twig | Ladies First: A Story of Women in Hip-Hop | |
| 2023 (8th) | Roger Ross Williams; Brooklyn Sudano | Love to Love You, Donna Summer | |
| 2024 (9th) | Laurent Bouzereau | Music by John Williams | |
| 2024 (9th) | Bao Nguyen | The Greatest Night in Pop | |
| 2024 (9th) | Irene Taylor | I Am: Celine Dion | |
| 2024 (9th) | Morgan Neville | Piece by Piece | |
| 2024 (9th) | Thom Zimny | Road Diary: Bruce Springsteen and the E Street Band | |
| 2024 (9th) | Johan Grimonprez | Soundtrack to a Coup d'Etat | |
| 2025 (10th) | Bernard MacMahon | Becoming Led Zeppelin | |
| 2025 (10th) | Questlove | Sly Lives! (aka The Burden of Black Genius) | |
| 2025 (10th) | Amy J. Berg | It's Never Over, Jeff Buckley | |
| 2025 (10th) | Susan Lacy; Jessica Levin | Billy Joel: And So It Goes | |
| 2025 (10th) | Andrew Dominik | Bono: Stories of Surrender | |
| 2025 (10th) | Questlove; Oz Rodriguez | Ladies & Gentlemen... 50 Years of SNL Music | |

== Filmmakers with multiple wins and nominations ==
=== Multiple wins ===
- Questlove - 2

=== Multiple nominations ===
- Questlove - 3

== See also ==
- Critics' Choice Documentary Award for Best Documentary Feature
- Academy Award for Best Documentary Feature
- Independent Spirit Award for Best Documentary Feature
