= Haizlip =

Haizlip is a surname. Notable people with the surname include:

- Ellis Haizlip (1929–1991), American television and theatrical producer and broadcaster
- Jay Haizlip, American skateboarder
- Shirlee Taylor Haizlip (born 1937), American author
- Mae Haizlip, American aviator
- Jim Haizlip, American aviator who set transcontinental airspeed record in 1932
