= Goldie Hawn =

American actress (born 1945)

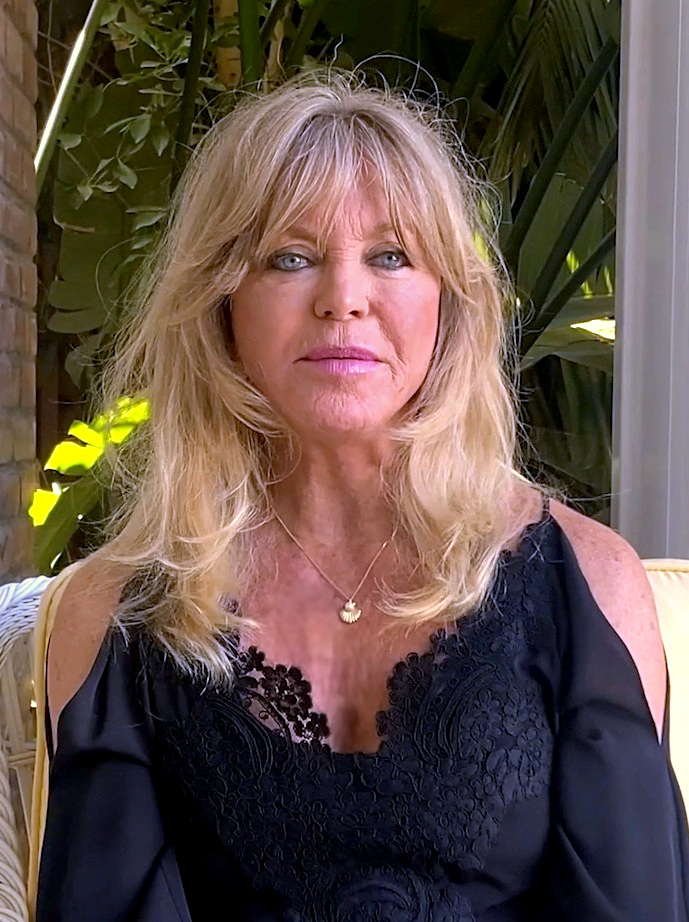
- Hawn in 2021
- Born: Goldie Jeanne Hawn; November 21, 1945 (age 80); Washington, D.C., U.S.
- Occupations: Actress, singer
- Years active: 1966–present
- Known for: Full list
- Spouses: Gus Trikonis (m. 1969; div. 1976) Bill Hudson (m. 1976; div. 1982)
- Partner: Kurt Russell (1983–present)
- Children: Oliver; Kate; Wyatt
- Awards: Full list

Goldie Jeanne Hawn (born November 21, 1945) is an American actress and singer. She achieved stardom and acclaim for playing lighthearted comedic roles in film and television. In a career spanning six decades, she has received several awards, including an Academy Award and a Golden Globe Award as well as nominations for a BAFTA Award and two Primetime Emmy Awards.

She rose to fame on the NBC sketch comedy program Rowan & Martin's Laugh-In (1968–1970). She made her screen debut in a minor role in the western comedy The One and Only, Genuine, Original Family Band (1968), in which she co-starred with her future partner, Kurt Russell. She went on to receive the Academy Award for Best Supporting Actress and Golden Globe Award for Best Supporting Actress for her comedic role in Cactus Flower (1969). She was nominated for the Academy Award for Best Actress for playing a woman who enlists for the army in the comedy Private Benjamin (1980). As a singer, she released her debut self-titled album Goldie in 1972.

Hawn has also starred in such comedy films as There's a Girl in My Soup (1970), Butterflies Are Free (1972), The Sugarland Express (1974), Shampoo (1975), Foul Play (1978), and Seems Like Old Times (1980). She later starred in Overboard (1987), Bird on a Wire (1990), Death Becomes Her, Housesitter (both 1992), The First Wives Club (1996), The Out-of-Towners (1999), and The Banger Sisters (2002). Hawn made her return to film with roles in Snatched (2017), The Christmas Chronicles (2018), and The Christmas Chronicles 2 (2020).

Hawn is the mother of actors Oliver Hudson, Kate Hudson, and Wyatt Russell. She has been in a relationship with Kurt Russell since 1983. In 2003, she founded the Hawn Foundation, which educates underprivileged children.

== Early life ==
Hawn was born in Washington, D.C., to Laura (née Steinhoff), a jewelry shop/dance school owner, and Edward Rutledge Hawn, a musician and conductor who was a descendant of Edward Rutledge, the youngest signatory of the Declaration of Independence. She was named after her mother's aunt. She has one sister, entertainment publicist Patti Hawn; their brother, Edward Jr., died in infancy before Patti was conceived. Growing up, the girls were unaware of their deceased brother.

Her father was a Presbyterian of German and English descent. Her mother was Jewish, the daughter of Jewish immigrants from Hungary. Hawn was raised Jewish in Takoma Park, Maryland, and attended Montgomery Blair High School in nearby Silver Spring, Maryland.

Hawn began taking ballet and tap dance lessons at the age of three and danced in the corps de ballet of the Ballets Russes de Monte Carlo production of The Nutcracker in 1955. She made her stage debut in 1964, playing Juliet in a Virginia Shakespeare Festival production of Romeo and Juliet.

In 1964, Hawn ran and taught in a ballet school, having dropped out of American University where she was majoring in drama. She made her professional dancing debut in a production of Can-Can at the Texas Pavilion of the New York World's Fair. She began working as a professional dancer a year later and appeared as a go-go dancer in New York City and at the Peppermint Box in New Jersey.

== Career ==
=== 1966–1969: Breakthrough and acclaim ===
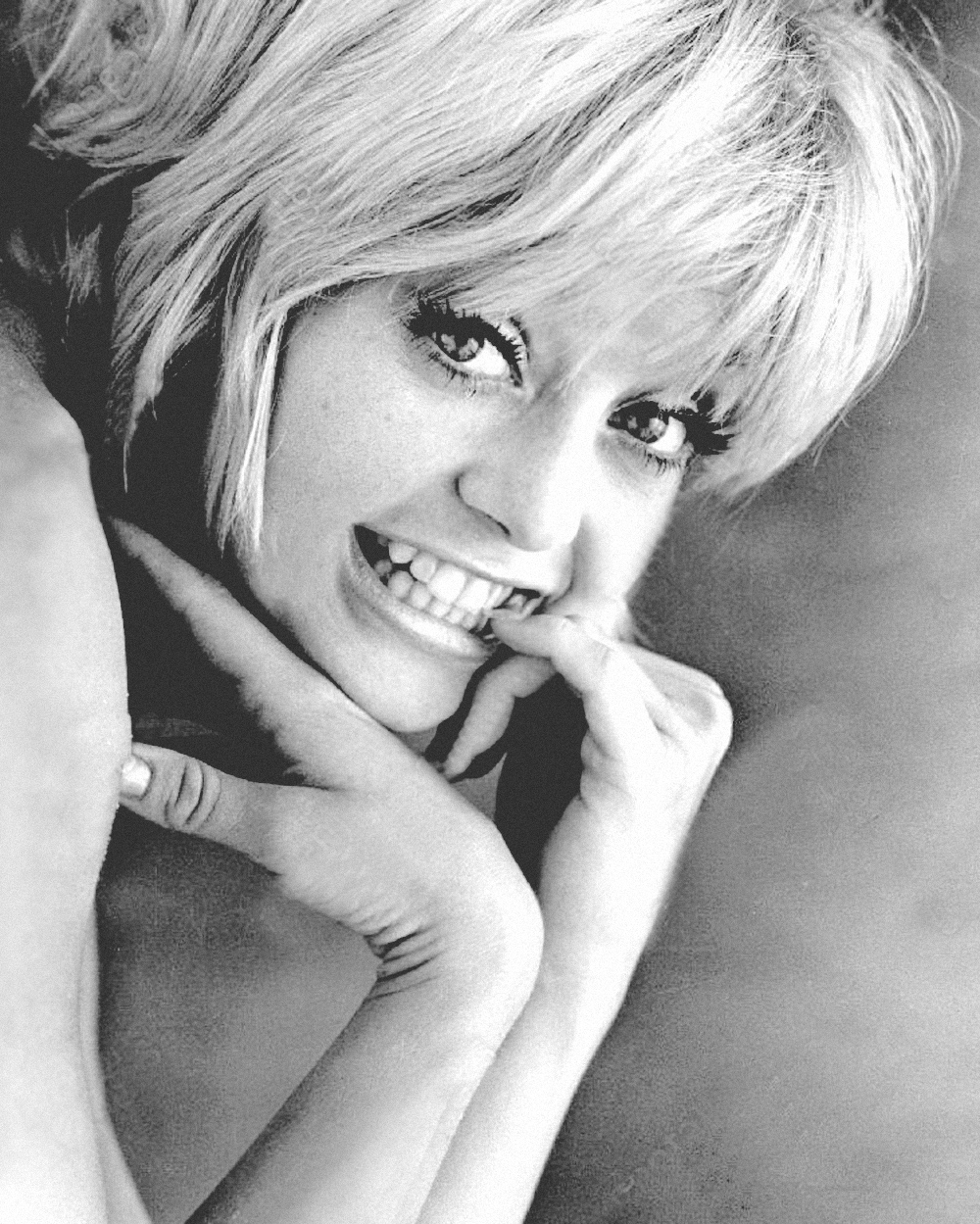
Publicity photo for Cactus Flower (1969)

Hawn moved to California to dance in a show at Melodyland Theatre, a theater in the round across from Disneyland, joining the chorus of Pal Joey and How to Succeed in Business Without Really Trying during the June 14 to September 1966 season. Hawn began her acting career as a cast member of the short-lived sitcom Good Morning World during the 1967–1968 television season, her role being that of the girlfriend of a radio disc jockey, with a stereotypical "dumb blonde" personality.

Her next role, which brought her to international attention, was also as a dumb blonde, as one of the regular cast members on the 1968–1973 sketch comedy show Rowan & Martin's Laugh-In. Hawn often broke out into high-pitched giggles in the middle of a joke, then delivered a polished performance a moment later. Noted as much for her chipper attitude as for her bikini-attired and painted body, Hawn was seen as a 1960s "It" girl.

Her Laugh-In persona was parlayed into three popular film appearances in the late 1960s and early 1970s: Cactus Flower, There's a Girl in My Soup, and Butterflies Are Free. Hawn made her film debut in a bit role as a giggling dancer in the 1968 film The One and Only, Genuine, Original Family Band, in which she was billed as "Goldie Jeanne", but in her first major film role, in Cactus Flower (1969), she won an Academy Award for Best Supporting Actress as Walter Matthau's suicidal fiancée. In the same year she appeared in The Spring Thing, a television special hosted by Bobbie Gentry and Noel Harrison. Other guests were Meredith MacRae, Irwin C. Watson, Rod McKuen, Shirley Bassey and Harpers Bizarre.

=== 1970–1989: Comedy stardom ===
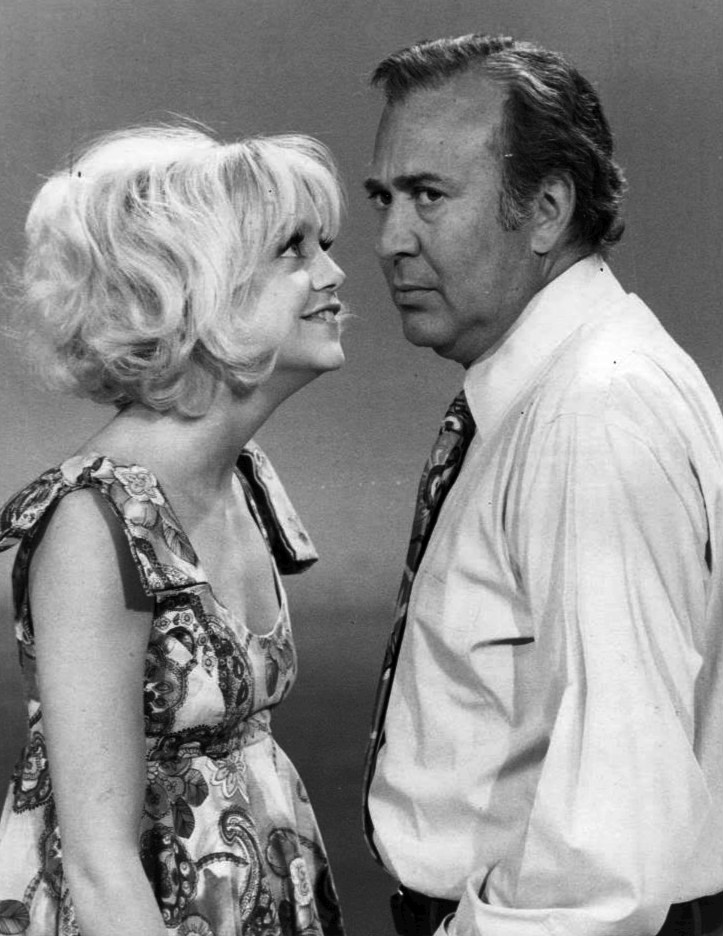
With Carl Reiner on Rowan & Martin's Laugh-In, 1970

After Hawn's Academy Award win, her film career took off. She starred in a string of successful comedies starting with There's a Girl in My Soup (1970), $ (1971), and Butterflies Are Free (1972). She continued to prove herself in the dramatic league in 1974 with the satirical dramas The Girl from Petrovka and Steven Spielberg's theatrical debut The Sugarland Express, and then co-starred in Hal Ashby's satire Shampoo (1975). She also hosted two television specials: Pure Goldie in 1971 and The Goldie Hawn Special in 1978. The latter was a sort of comeback for Hawn, who had been out of the spotlight for two years since the 1976 release of the romantic comedy western The Duchess and the Dirtwater Fox, while she was focusing on her marriage and the birth of her son.

On the special she performed show tunes and comedy bits alongside comic legend George Burns, teen matinee idol Shaun Cassidy, television star John Ritter (during his days on Three's Company), and even the Harlem Globetrotters joined her for a montage. The special later went on to be nominated for a primetime Emmy. Four months later the film Foul Play (with Chevy Chase), was released and became a box office smash, reviving Hawn's film career. The plot centered on an innocent woman in San Francisco who becomes mixed up in an assassination plot. Hawn's next film, Mario Monicelli's Lovers and Liars (1979), was a box office bomb.

In 1972, Hawn recorded and released a solo country LP for Warner Brothers, titled Goldie. It was recorded with the help of Dolly Parton and Buck Owens. AllMusic gives the album a favorable review, calling it a "sweetly endearing country-tinged middle of the road pop record".

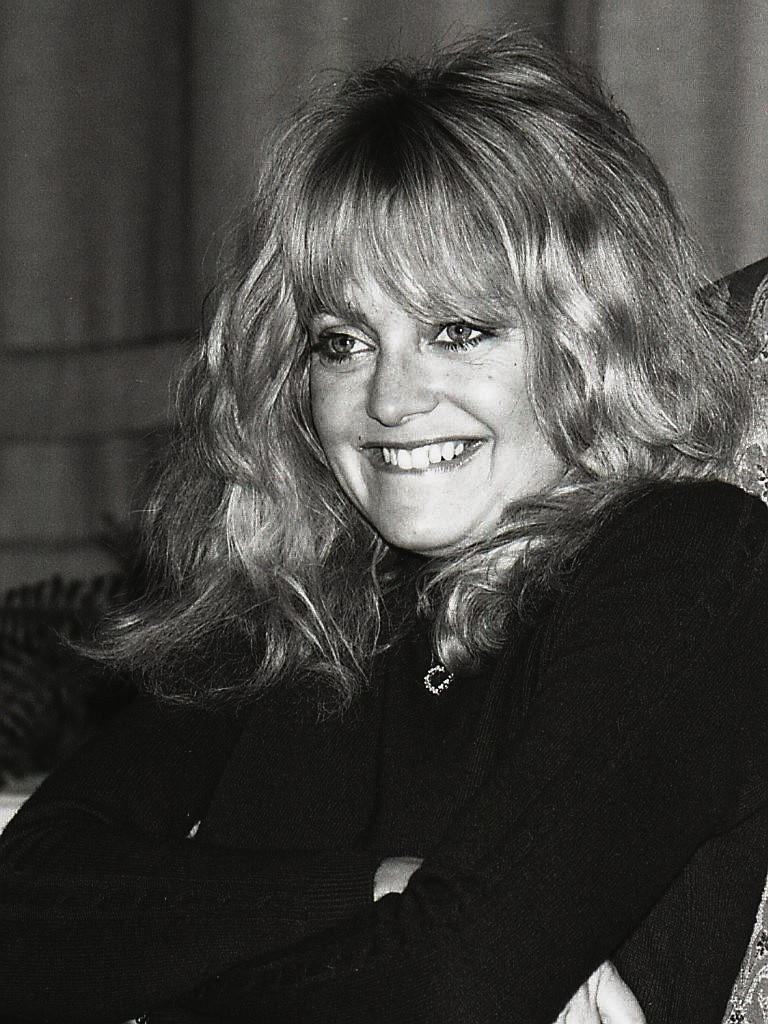
Hawn at the Grand Hôtel in Stockholm, 1981

Hawn's popularity continued into the 1980s, starting with another primetime variety special alongside actress and singer Liza Minnelli, Goldie and Liza Together (1980), which was nominated for four Emmy Awards. In the same year, Hawn took the lead role in Private Benjamin, a comedy she co-produced with her friend Nancy Meyers, who co-wrote the script. Meyers recalls Hawn's reaction when she first described the idea for the story with Hawn as its lead:

It was like watching the greatest audience I've ever seen. She laughed and then she got real emotional and her eyes would fill up with tears. She loved the image of herself in an Army uniform and she loved what the movie had to say.

Private Benjamin also stars Eileen Brennan and Armand Assante, and garnered Hawn her second Academy Award nomination, this time for Best Actress. Hawn's box office success continued with comedies like Seems Like Old Times (1980), written by Neil Simon; Best Friends (1982), written by Valerie Curtin and Barry Levinson; Protocol (1984), co-written by Nancy Meyers; Wildcats (1986)—Hawn also served as executive producer on the latter two—and the World War II romantic drama Swing Shift (1984).

At the age of thirty-nine, Hawn posed for the cover of Playboy's January 1985 issue and was the subject of the Playboy Interview. Her last film of the 1980s was opposite partner Kurt Russell, for the third time, in the comedy Overboard (1987).

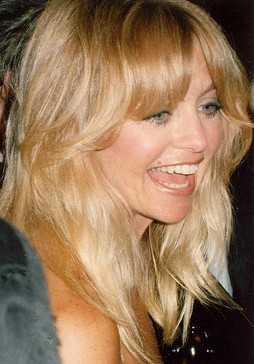
Hawn in 1989

=== 1990–2002: Established star and hiatus ===
In 1990, she starred in the action comedy Bird on a Wire, a critically panned but commercially successful film that paired Hawn with Mel Gibson. Hawn had mixed success in the early 1990s, with the thriller Deceived (1991), the drama CrissCross, and opposite Bruce Willis and Meryl Streep in Death Becomes Her (both 1992). Earlier that year, she starred in Housesitter, a screwball comedy with Steve Martin, which was a commercial success.

Hawn was absent from the screen for four years while caring for her mother, who died of cancer in 1994. She made her entry back into film as producer of the satirical comedy Something to Talk About, starring Julia Roberts and Dennis Quaid, and made her directorial debut with the television film Hope (1997), starring Christine Lahti and Jena Malone. Hawn returned to the screen in 1996 as the aging, alcoholic actress Elise Elliot in the financially and critically successful The First Wives Club, opposite Bette Midler and Diane Keaton, with whom she covered the Lesley Gore hit "You Don't Own Me" for the film's soundtrack. Hawn also performed a cover version of the Beatles' song "A Hard Day's Night" on George Martin's 1998 album In My Life.

She starred in Woody Allen's musical Everyone Says I Love You (1996) and reunited with Steve Martin for the comedy The Out-of-Towners (1999), a remake of the 1970 Neil Simon hit. The film was critically panned and was a box-office failure. In 1997, Hawn, along with her co-stars from The First Wives Club, Diane Keaton and Bette Midler, received the Women in Film Crystal Awards.

In 1999, she was awarded Hasty Pudding Woman of the Year. In 2001, Hawn was reunited with former co-stars Warren Beatty (her co-star in $ and Shampoo) and Diane Keaton for the comedy Town & Country, a critical and financial fiasco. Budgeted at an estimated US$90 million, the film opened to little notice and grossed only $7 million in its North American theatrical release. In 2002, she starred in The Banger Sisters, opposite Susan Sarandon and Geoffrey Rush, her last live action film for fifteen years. In 2005 Hawn's autobiography, A Lotus Grows in the Mud, was published.

=== 2013–present: Career resurgence ===
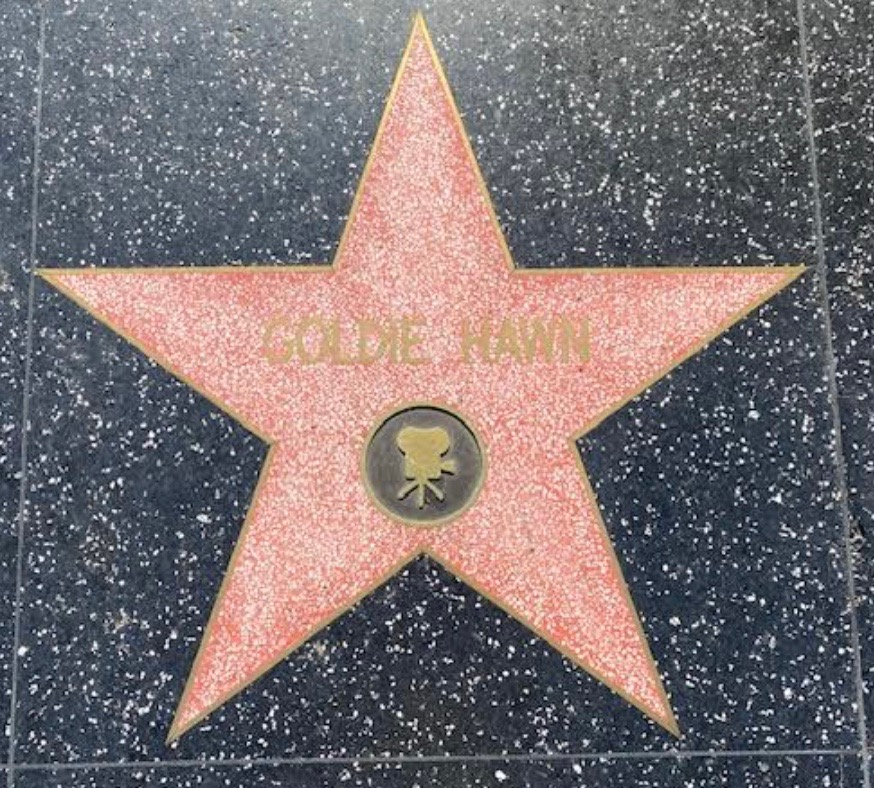
Hawn's star on the Hollywood Walk of Fame.

In 2013, Hawn guest-starred, along with Gordon Ramsay, in an episode of Phineas and Ferb, in which she provided the voice of neighbor Peggy McGee. In 2017, Hawn returned to the big screen for the first time since 2002, co-starring with Amy Schumer in the comedy Snatched, playing mother and daughter. In 2018, Hawn cameoed as Mrs. Claus in the Netflix film The Christmas Chronicles. She played Mrs. Claus again, in a leading role, in its 2020 sequel The Christmas Chronicles 2.

== Personal life ==
=== Beliefs and views ===
Hawn has studied meditation. In 2012, she described her religious beliefs as "Jewish Buddhist". Hawn is a supporter of the LGBTQ community. Speaking on nations such as Nigeria and others which have criminalized gay people, she said "This is man's inhumanity to man, of the first order." Hawn endorsed Senator Ted Kennedy in the 1980 Democratic presidential primaries. Hawn endorsed Senator Gary Hart in the 1984 Democratic Party presidential primaries. After the primaries, Hawn supported Walter Mondale for president.

=== Marriages and family ===
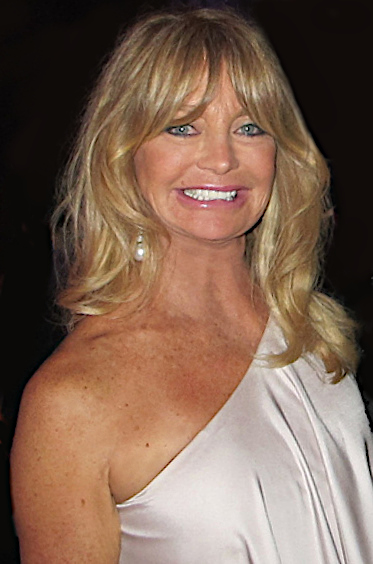
Hawn at the Cinema Against AIDS gala in May 2011

==== Early relationships ====
Hawn's pre-fame boyfriends included actor Mark Goddard and singer Spiro Venduras. Her first husband was dancer (later director) Gus Trikonis, who appeared as a Shark gang member in West Side Story. They married on May 16, 1969, and separated on April 9, 1973. Hawn then dated stuntman Ted Grossman, Swedish actor Bruno Wintzell and Italian actor Franco Nero, but did not file for divorce from Trikonis until New Year's Eve 1975, after becoming engaged to musician Bill Hudson of the Hudson Brothers, whom she had met the previous summer on a flight from New York to Los Angeles.

Hawn was granted a divorce in June 1976 and married Hudson on July 3 in Takoma Park, Maryland, where she grew up. They had two children, son Oliver (born September 7, 1976) and daughter Kate (born April 19, 1979). Hudson filed for divorce on August 15, 1980. Hawn subsequently had romances with French actor Yves Rénier and Moroccan businessman Victor Drai. The divorce from Hudson was finalized in March 1982.

==== Kurt Russell ====
Hawn has been in a relationship with Kurt Russell since Valentine's Day 1983. The couple first met while filming The One and Only, Genuine, Original Family Band in 1967, but became involved after reconnecting on the set of Swing Shift. They have a son together, Wyatt (born July 10, 1986). In 2000 and again in 2004, news outlets reported that Hawn and Russell were on the verge of breaking up. During the alleged separations, Hawn was linked to newsman Charles Glass and Pakistani former cricketer and former Prime Minister, Imran Khan. Hawn and Russell, who celebrated 40 years together in 2023, own homes in British Columbia, Canada (Vancouver), Colorado (Snowmass), New York (Manhattan), and California (Santa Ynez Valley, Brentwood, and Palm Desert). Hawn has said that she has no plans to marry Russell, stating that she "would have been long divorced if [she'd] been married," and that she and Russell chose to stay together and they do not feel that marriage "cements" a relationship.

=== The Hawn Foundation ===
In 2003, Hawn founded the Hawn Foundation, a non-profit organization which provides youth education programs intended to improve academic performance through "life-enhancing strategies for well-being". The Hawn Foundation has supported research studies conducted by external researchers to evaluate the effectiveness of its educational program for children, called MindUP.

== Filmography ==
=== Film ===
Year	Title	Role	Director	Notes	Ref.
1968	The One and Only, Genuine, Original Family Band	Giggly Girl	Michael O'Herlihy		
1969	The Sidehackers	Spectator	Gus Trikonis	Uncredited	
1969	Cactus Flower	Toni Simmons	Gene Saks		
1970	There's a Girl in My Soup	Marion	Roy Boulting		
1971	$	Dawn Divine	Richard Brooks		
1972	Butterflies Are Free	Jill Tanner	Milton Katselas		
1974	The Sugarland Express	Lou Jean	Steven Spielberg		
1974	The Girl from Petrovka	Oktyabrina	Robert Ellis Miller		
1975	Shampoo	Jill Haynes	Hal Ashby		
1976	The Duchess and the Dirtwater Fox	Amanda Quaid / Duchess Swansbury	Melvin Frank		
1978	Foul Play	Gloria Mundy	Colin Higgins		
1979	Lovers and Liars	Anita	Mario Monicelli		
1980	Private Benjamin	Judy Benjamin	Howard Zieff	Also executive producer	
1980	Seems Like Old Times	Glenda Parks	Jay Sandrich		
1982	Best Friends	Paula McCullen	Norman Jewison		
1984	Swing Shift	Kay Walsh	Jonathan Demme		
1984	Protocol	Sunny Davis	Herbert Ross	Also executive producer	
1986	Wildcats	Molly McGrath	Michael Ritchie	Also executive producer	
1987	Overboard	Joanna Stayton / Annie Proffitt	Garry Marshall	Also executive producer (uncredited)	
1990	Bird on a Wire	Marianne Graves	John Badham		
1990	My Blue Heaven	—N/a	Herbert Ross	Executive producer	
1991	Deceived	Adrienne Saunders	Damian Harris		
1992	CrissCross	Tracy Cross	Chris Menges	Also executive producer (uncredited)	
1992	Housesitter	Gwen Duncle / Buckley / Phillips	Frank Oz		
1992	Death Becomes Her	Helen Sharp	Robert Zemeckis		
1995	Something to Talk About	—N/a	Lasse Hallström	Executive producer	
1996	The First Wives Club	Elise Elliot Atchison	Hugh Wilson		
1996	Everyone Says I Love You	Steffi Dandridge	Woody Allen		
1999	The Out-of-Towners	Nancy Clark	Sam Weisman		
2001	Town & Country	Mona Morris	Peter Chelsom		
2002	The Banger Sisters	Suzette	Bob Dolman		
2012	Hot Flash Havoc	Narrator	Marc Bennett	Voice; Documentary	
2017	Snatched	Linda Middleton	Jonathan Levine		
2017	SPF-18	Narrator	Alex Israel	Voice	
2018	The Christmas Chronicles	Mrs. Claus	Clay Kaytis	Cameo	
2020	The Christmas Chronicles 2	Mrs. Claus	Chris Columbus		
2026	I'm Chevy Chase and You're Not	Herself	Marina Zenovich	Documentary	

=== Television ===
Year	Title	Role	Notes
1967–68	Good Morning World	Sandy Kramer	Season 1 (20 episodes)
1968–70	Rowan & Martin's Laugh-In	Goldie	Seasons 1–4 (64 episodes)
1997	Hope	—N/a	Director / executive producer; Television film
1997	Space Ghost Coast to Coast	Herself	
2001	When Billie Beat Bobby	—N/a	Executive producer; Television Film
2002	The Matthew Shepard Story	—N/a	Executive producer; Television Film
2013	Phineas and Ferb	Peggy McGee	Voice; Episode: "Thanks But No Thanks"
2022	Gutsy	Herself	

== Awards and nominations ==
Association	Year	Category	Work	Result	Ref.
Academy Awards	1970	Best Supporting Actress	Cactus Flower	Won	
Academy Awards	1981	Best Actress	Private Benjamin	Nominated	
American Comedy Awards	1987	Funniest Actress in a Motion Picture (Leading Role)	Wildcats	Nominated	
American Comedy Awards	1988	Funniest Actress in a Motion Picture (Leading Role)	Overboard	Nominated	
American Comedy Awards	1993	Funniest Actress in a Motion Picture (Leading Role)	Housesitter	Nominated	
American Comedy Awards	1997	Funniest Actress in a Motion Picture (Leading Role)	The First Wives Club	Nominated	
Bambi Awards	1999	International Film Actress	—N/a	Won	
Blockbuster Entertainment Awards	1997	Favorite Actress – Comedy	The First Wives Club	Won	
British Academy Film Awards	1971	Best Actress in a Leading Role	Cactus Flower, There's a Girl in My Soup	Nominated	
CinemaCon Awards	2017	Cinema Icon Award	—N/a	Won	
David di Donatello Awards	1970	Special David Award	Cactus Flower	Won	
Golden Apple Awards	1996	Female Star of the Year (shared with Diane Keaton and Bette Midler)	—N/a	Nominated	
Goldene Kamera Awards	2005	Lifetime Achievement Award	—N/a	Won	
Golden Globe Awards	1970	Best Supporting Actress – Motion Picture	Cactus Flower	Won	
Golden Globe Awards	1970	New Star of the Year – Actress	Cactus Flower	Nominated	
Golden Globe Awards	1973	Best Actress in a Motion Picture – Musical or Comedy	Butterflies Are Free	Nominated	
Golden Globe Awards	1976	Best Actress in a Motion Picture – Musical or Comedy	Shampoo	Nominated	
Golden Globe Awards	1977	Best Actress in a Motion Picture – Musical or Comedy	The Duchess and the Dirtwater Fox	Nominated	
Golden Globe Awards	1979	Best Actress in a Motion Picture – Musical or Comedy	Foul Play	Nominated	
Golden Globe Awards	1981	Best Actress in a Motion Picture – Musical or Comedy	Private Benjamin	Nominated	
Golden Globe Awards	1983	Best Actress in a Motion Picture – Musical or Comedy	Best Friends	Nominated	
Golden Globe Awards	2003	Best Actress in a Motion Picture – Musical or Comedy	The Banger Sisters	Nominated	
Golden Raspberry Awards	2002	Worst Supporting Actress	Town & Country	Nominated	
Golden Raspberry Awards	2018	Worst Supporting Actress	Snatched	Nominated	
Hasty Pudding Theatricals	1999	Hasty Pudding Woman of the Year	—N/a	Won	
Hollywood Film Awards	2003	Outstanding Achievement in Acting	—N/a	Won	
Hollywood Walk of Fame	2017	2,609th Star – Motion Picture	—N/a	Inducted	
National Board of Review Awards	1997	Best Acting by an Ensemble (shared with the cast)	The First Wives Club	Won	
National Society of Film Critics Awards	1981	Best Actress	Private Benjamin	Nominated	
New York Film Critics Circle Awards	1981	Best Actress	Private Benjamin	Runner-up	
New York Women in Film & Television Awards	1984	Muse Award	—N/a	Won	
People's Choice Awards	1981	Favorite Motion Picture Actress (tied with Jane Fonda)	—N/a	Won	
Primetime Emmy Awards	1969	Special Classification – Individuals	Rowan & Martin's Laugh-In	Nominated	
Primetime Emmy Awards	1980	Outstanding Variety or Music Program	Goldie and Liza Together	Nominated	
Rembrandt Awards	2008	Honorary Award	—N/a	Won	
Satellite Awards	1997	Best Supporting Actress in a Motion Picture – Musical or Comedy	Everyone Says I Love You	Nominated	
US Comedy Arts Festival	2006	AFI Star Award	—N/a	Won	
Women in Film Crystal Awards	1997	Crystal Award	—N/a	Won	

== Discography ==
=== Albums ===
- 1972, Goldie, Reprise Records: MS 2061

=== Singles ===
- 1972, "Pitta Patta", Reprise Records: REP 1126 (directed by Van Dyke Parks)
- 1972, "Carey", Reprise Records: K14211 U.K Issue
- 1997, "You Don't Own Me", Columbia Records: XPCD842 (with Bette Midler and Diane Keaton)
