= Clive Davis =

American music executive (1932–2026)

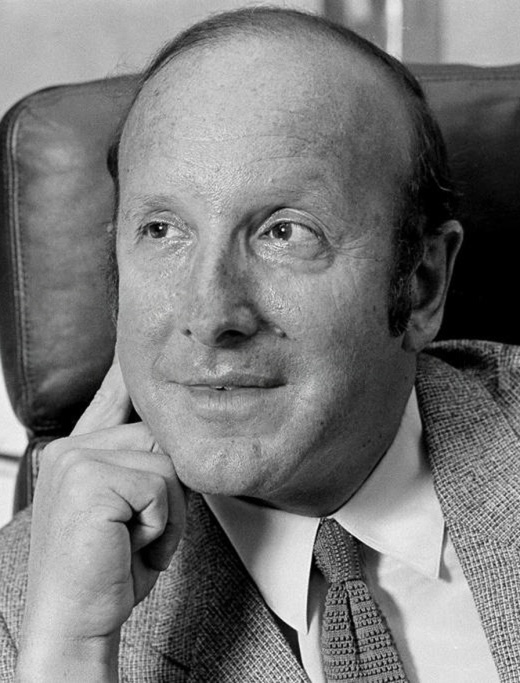
- Davis in 1980
- Born: Clive Jay Davis; April 4, 1932; New York City, U.S.
- Died: June 22, 2026 (aged 94); New York City, U.S.
- Education: New York University; Harvard Law School
- Occupations: Record producer; record executive
- Years active: 1960–2026
- Spouses: Helen Cohen (m. 1956; div. 1965) Janet Adelberg (m. 1966; div. 1985)
- Children: 4, including Doug
- Website: clivedavis.com

Clive Jay Davis (April 4, 1932 – June 22, 2026) was an American record executive, A&R executive, record producer and lawyer. He won four Grammy Awards and was inducted into the Rock and Roll Hall of Fame as a non-performer in 2000. From 1967 to 1973, Davis was the president of Columbia Records. He was the founder and president of Arista Records from 1974 through 2000 until founding J Records. From 2002 until April 2008, he was chair and CEO of the RCA Music Group (which included RCA Records, J Records, and Arista Records), chair and CEO of J Records, and chair and CEO of BMG North America.

Davis is credited with having hired a young recording artist, Tony Orlando, as a music executive for Columbia in 1967, who provided Barry Manilow with his first recording contract a few years later. Davis signed many artists who achieved significant success, including Pink Floyd; Sly and the Family Stone; Janis Joplin; Laura Nyro; Santana; Bruce Springsteen; Chicago; Earth, Wind & Fire; Aerosmith; Billy Joel; Donovan; the Bay City Rollers; Blood, Sweat & Tears; Luther Vandross; Loggins and Messina; Ace of Base; Olivia Longott; Westlife; and Gavin DeGraw. Davis is credited with bringing Whitney Houston and Barry Manilow to prominent stature as artists. Davis served as the chief creative officer of Sony Music Entertainment from 2008 until his death in 2026.

== Early life and education ==
Clive Jay Davis was born on April 4, 1932, in Brooklyn, New York City, to Jewish parents, Herman and Florence Davis. His father worked as an electrician and salesman. He grew up in the Brooklyn neighborhood of Crown Heights, and attended Erasmus Hall High School in Flatbush, Brooklyn.

His mother died of a cerebral hemorrhage at the age of 47, and his father died from a heart attack a year later while Davis was still a teenager. He moved in with his married sister who lived in Bayside, Queens. He attended New York University College of Arts & Science on scholarship in Manhattan, graduating magna cum laude with a degree in political science and Phi Beta Kappa in 1953. He received a full scholarship to Harvard Law School in Cambridge, Massachusetts, and graduated in 1956.

== Career ==
=== Columbia/CBS Records years ===
Davis practiced law in a small firm in New York, then moved on to the firm of Rosenman, Colin, Kaye, Petschek, and Freund two years later, where partner Ralph Colin had CBS as a client. Davis was subsequently hired by a former colleague at the firm, Harvey Schein, to become assistant counsel of CBS subsidiary Columbia Records at 28 with a guarantee that he would become general counsel the next year, which he did. As part of a reorganization of Columbia Records Group, group president Goddard Lieberson appointed Davis as administrative vice president and general manager in 1965. In 1966, CBS formed the Columbia–CBS Group which reorganized CBS's recorded music operations into CBS Records with Davis heading the new unit.

In 1967, Davis was appointed president and became interested in the newest generation of folk rock and rock and roll. One of his earliest pop signings was the British folk-rock musician Donovan, who enjoyed a string of successful hit singles and albums released in the U.S. on the Epic Records label. In the same year, Davis hired 23-year-old recording artist Tony Orlando as general manager of Columbia publishing subsidiary April-Blackwood Music; Orlando went on to become vice-president of Columbia/CBS Music and signed Barry Manilow in 1969. In June 1967, Davis attended the Monterey Pop Festival after his friends and business associate, Lou Adler, convinced him. He immediately signed Janis Joplin with Big Brother and the Holding Company, and Columbia went on to sign Laura Nyro; The Electric Flag; Santana; The Chambers Brothers; Bruce Springsteen; Chicago; Billy Joel; Blood, Sweat & Tears; Loggins and Messina; Aerosmith; and Pink Floyd (for rights to release their material outside of Europe).

Among the most commercially successful recordings released during Davis's tenure at Columbia was Lynn Anderson's Rose Garden, in late 1970. Davis insisted that "Rose Garden" be the country singer's next single release. The song crossed over and was a No. 1 hit in 16 countries worldwide. "Rose Garden" remained the biggest-selling album by a female country artist for 27 years. In 1972, Davis signed both Earth, Wind & Fire and Aerosmith to Columbia Records. In 1979 Aerosmith mentioned Davis in the song "No Surprize", in which Steven Tyler sings, "Old Clive Davis said he's surely gonna make us a star, I'm gonna make you a star, just the way you are." Starting on December 30, 1978, Bob Weir of the Grateful Dead occasionally changed the lyrics of the Dead standard "Jack Straw" in concert from "we used to play for silver, now we play for life", to "we used to play for acid, now we play for Clive." A Detroit band, Death, was one of the last bands Davis tried to sign to Columbia Records. A Rolling Stone article dated July 5, 1973, reported that CBS fired Clive Davis "amid allegations of misuse of funds and providing drugs to artists and disk jockeys" as part of an alleged payola scandal. Davis, however, denied that his dismissal was connected in any way to drugs or payola.

=== Arista years ===
After Davis was fired from CBS Records in 1973 for allegedly using company funds to bankroll his son's bar mitzvah, Columbia Pictures then hired him to be a consultant for the company's Bell Records label. He wrote his memoir and then founded Arista Records in 1974. The company was named after New York City's secondary school honor society with the name, of which Davis was a member. At Arista, Davis signed Barry Manilow, followed by Aretha Franklin, Dionne Warwick, Patti Smith, Westlife, Al Jourgensen, The Outlaws, Eric Carmen, Kenny G, the Bay City Rollers, Exposé, Taylor Dayne, Milli Vanilli, Ace of Base, Air Supply, Ray Parker Jr., Raydio, and Alicia Keys, and he brought Carly Simon, Melissa Manchester, Grateful Dead, The Kinks, Jermaine Stewart, Gil Scott-Heron (on whose episode of TV One's Unsung Davis was interviewed) and Lou Reed to the label. He co-founded Arista Nashville in 1989 with Tim DuBois, which became the home to Alan Jackson, Brooks & Dunn, Pam Tillis, and Brad Paisley.

Davis created a joint venture between Arista and LaFace Records with L.A. Reid and Babyface.. LaFace subsequently became the home of TLC, Usher, Outkast, Pink, and Toni Braxton. Davis assisted Sean "Puffy" Combs with the creation of Bad Boy Records; it became the home of the Notorious B.I.G., Craig Mack, Combs, Mase, 112, and Faith Evans, although Davis later admitted that he never quite understood rap music. In 1998, Davis signed LFO, who became best known for their 1999 hit single "Summer Girls". During the Arista years, he set up his own production company Clive Davis Entertainment, for a two-year first-look agreement with movie studio TriStar Pictures in 1987. Davis was made aware of Cissy Houston's daughter Whitney Houston after he saw the Houstons perform at a New York City nightclub. Impressed with what he heard, Davis signed her to Arista. Houston became one of the biggest selling artists in music history under the guidance of Davis at Arista.

=== J Records, RCA, Sony years ===
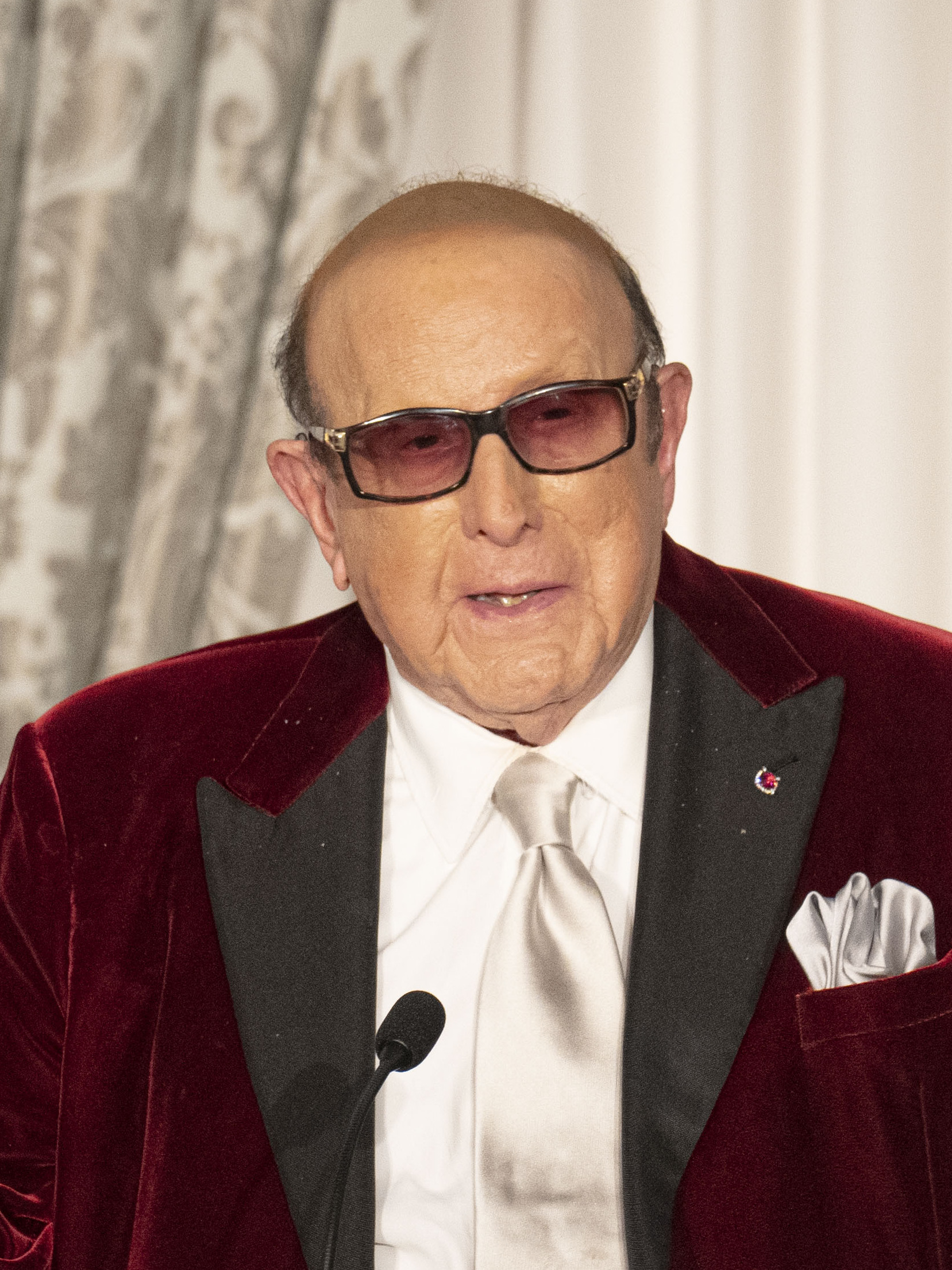
Davis at the 2023 Kennedy Center Honors dinner

Davis was fired from Arista in 2000 and started J Records, an independent label with financial backing from Arista parent Bertelsmann Music Group, named with the middle initial of Davis and his four children. BMG bought a majority stake in J Records in 2002, and Davis became president and CEO of the larger RCA Music Group. His continued success in breaking new artists was recognized by the music industry A&R site HitQuarters when he was named the "world's No.1 A&R of 2001" based on worldwide chart data for the year.

In 2004, BMG merged with Sony Music Entertainment to form Sony BMG. With the assets of the former CBS Records (renamed Sony Music Entertainment in 1991) now under Sony's ownership, the joint venture resulted in a return of sorts for Davis to his former employer. Davis remained with RCA Label Group until 2008, when he was named chief creative officer for Sony BMG. Davis was elevated to chief creative officer of Sony Music Entertainment, a title he held until his death, as part of a corporate restructuring when Sony BMG became Sony Music Entertainment in late 2008 after BMG had sold its shares to Sony. Arista Records and J Records, which were both founded by Davis, were dissolved in October 2011 through the restructuring of RCA Records. All artists under those labels were moved to RCA Records.

== Personal life and death ==
Davis was married to Helen Cohen from 1956 to 1965 and to Janet Adelberg from 1966 to 1985; both marriages ended in divorce. He had four children, including Doug Davis, a music executive and Grammy Award-winning record producer, and Fred Davis, an investment banker at The Raine Group. Davis had eight grandchildren. In 2013, at the age of 80, Davis publicly came out as bisexual in his autobiography The Soundtrack of My Life. On the daytime talk show Katie, he told host Katie Couric that he hoped his revelation would lead to "greater understanding" of bisexuality. The autobiography was the basis for the two-hour documentary Clive Davis: The Soundtrack of Our Lives.

Davis died at his home in Manhattan on June 22, 2026, at the age of 94. He had been hospitalized with respiratory problems shortly before his death. His funeral service was held on June 29 at Central Synagogue in New York City. The funeral service included eulogies by Bruce Springsteen, Barry Manilow, Alicia Keys and Dionne Warwick.

== Legacy ==
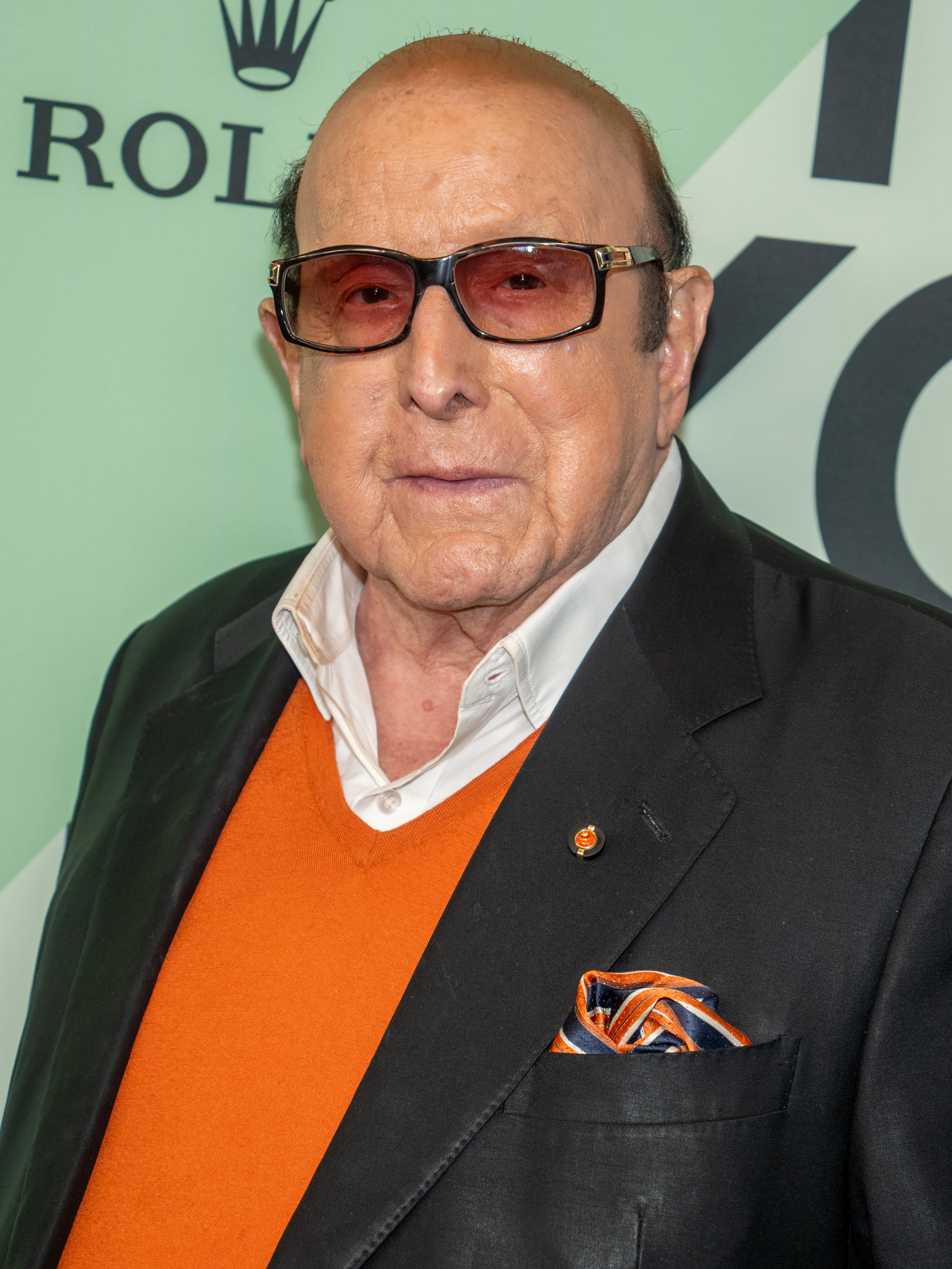
Davis at the 2025 New York Film Festival

In an obituary, The New York Times called Davis a "Hitmaking Titan of the Music Industry" who became one of "music's most powerful executives". He was noted for elevating the careers of several influential musicians including Aretha Franklin; Barry Manilow; Billy Joel; Carlos Santana; Chicago; Earth, Wind and Fire; Aerosmith; Bruce Springsteen; and Whitney Houston. The New York Times regarded him as being among the "few non-performers in the music industry to become a household name".

The BBC regarded Davis as "one of the most influential music executives in the history of rock and pop". CNN also called Davis a "monumental music producer and record industry titan" who "nurtured [stars]" in his career. The Guardian noted his ability to find musical talent as he "predicted music's biggest stars like no one else". Grammy Award winning producer Diane Warren called Davis the "greatest music man of all time". The Hollywood Reporter credited his "golden ear" who helped elevate Janis Joplin's career and "made Bruce Springsteen and Whitney Houston household names" and "carried Carlos Santana and Aretha Franklin to newfound fame". Davis was considered a bisexual icon who helped shift the cultural attitude around bisexuality, with Yahoo calling him a "bisexual star-maker".

An alumnus of New York University, Davis was a significant benefactor to the institution. The recorded music division of its Tisch School of the Arts is named in his honor as the Clive Davis Institute of Recorded Music.

=== Popular culture ===
Davis was portrayed by Stanley Tucci in Whitney Houston: I Wanna Dance with Somebody, a Sony Pictures biographical film about Houston's life and career. Davis also served as a producer on the film. A 2024 interview with Davis conducted by Ritch Esra and Eric Knight was published on MubuTV.

== Awards and honors ==
As a producer, Davis won four Grammy Awards. Davis also received the Grammy Trustees Award in 2000 and the President's Merit Award at the 2009 Grammys. In 2011, the 200-seat theater at the Grammy Museum was named the "Clive Davis Theater".

In 2000, Davis was inducted into the Rock and Roll Hall of Fame in the non-performers category. The same year, he received the Golden Plate Award of the American Academy of Achievement. In 2015, he was recognized by Equality Forum as one of the 31 Icons of the LGBT History Month. Davis was a 2018 honoree at The New Jewish Home's Eight Over Eighty Gala.

=== Grammy Awards ===
Category	Year	Work	Result	Ref
Grammy Award for Album of the Year	2000	Supernatural by Santana	Won	
Grammy Award for Best Rock Album	2000	Supernatural by Santana	Won	
Grammy Award for Best R&B Album	2000	My Love Is Your Love by Whitney Houston	Nominated	
Grammy Award for Best Pop Vocal Album	2006	Breakaway by Kelly Clarkson	Won	
Grammy Award for Best R&B Album	2009	Jennifer Hudson, Jennifer Hudson	Won	
Grammy Award for Record of the Year	2009	"Bleeding Love" by Leona Lewis	Nominated	

== Written works ==
- Clive: Inside the Record Business. with James Willwerth. William Morrow and Company. 1975. ISBN 978-0-688-02872-5. OCLC 960303.
- The Soundtrack of My Life. with Anthony DeCurtis. Simon & Schuster. 2013. ISBN 978-1-4767-1478-3. OCLC 826998284.

Business positions
Preceded by Goddard Lieberson	President of CBS Records; 1967–1973	Succeeded by Goddard Lieberson
Preceded by first	Founder & President of Arista Records; 1974–2000	Succeeded by Antonio "L.A." Reid
Preceded by first	Founder & Chief Executive Officer of J Records; 2000 to April 2004	Succeeded by none (J Records began functioning under the RCA Music Group)
Preceded by first	Chief Executive Officer of RCA Music Group; 2002 to April 2008	Succeeded by Barry Weiss (RCA/Jive Label Group)
Preceded by first	Chief Creative Officer of Sony Music Entertainment; April 2008 – June 22, 2026	Succeeded by TBD
