= Clive Davis: The Soundtrack of Our Lives =

- Film poster
- Directed by: Chris Perkel
- Release date: April 2017 (Tribeca)
- Running time: 123 minutes
- Country: United States

Clive Davis: The Soundtrack of Our Lives is a documentary about the career of American record executive Clive Davis. It was directed and edited by Chris Perkel and produced by Michael Bernstein. The film is based in his autobiography The Soundtrack of My Life, released in 2013.

== Critical reception ==
Variety noted that in the film "we get the saga of a tender musical fairy godfather", but "you won’t learn much about Davis’ personal story". The Arts Desk wrote that "it's an extraordinary two-hour tale of a man with great ears and a passion to match". In a negative review, IndieWire wrote that the film is not a documentary, but a "prolonged tribute reel with ample material to fuel a dozen lifetime achievement award ceremonies" and the film's "hagiographic tone only worsens once Davis himself takes centerstage as the chief interview subject".

=== Accolades ===
Year	Award	Category	Nominee	Result	Ref.
2017	Critics' Choice Documentary Awards	Best Music Documentary	Clive Davis The Soundtrack of Our Lives	Won	
2017	Capri, Hollywood	Capri Documentary Award	Clive Davis The Soundtrack of Our Lives	Won	
2017	Hollywood Music In Media Awards	Best Music Documentary	Clive Davis The Soundtrack of Our Lives	Won	
