= Hot Flash Havoc =

- Film poster
- Directed by: Marc Bennett
- Written by: Marnie Inskip
- Produced by: Heidi Houston & Gary Jaffe
- Edited by: Gary Jaffe
- Distributed by: Iron Rose Films
- Release date: March 30, 2012
- Running time: 88 minutes
- Country: United States
- Language: English

Hot Flash Havoc is a feature-length documentary film focused on menopause.

The film, narrated by Goldie Hawn, describes the journey through perimenopause, menopause and into post-menopause by examining in-depth personal experiences of women and featuring relevant perspectives by medical experts. Presented by Iron Rose Films, it is directed by Marc Bennett, produced by Heidi Houston and Gary Jaffe, written by Marnie Inskip, and edited by Gary Jaffe.

Houston's inspiration for the film came after three years of battling a range of health issues related to menopause and its precursor, perimenopause. There are currently over 1 billion women in menopause and over 1.5 billion women in perimenopause. The women interviewed in the documentary talk about their sex lives with candor and humor. The film addresses the use of hormone therapy to treat the symptoms of menopause and confronts the 2002 Women's Health Initiative study that led women to forgo estrogen-replacement medications and, in some cases, jeopardize their health.

The documentary was selected for several film festivals around the United States including The Aspen Film Festival, The Film Festival of Colorado, Fort Lauderdale International Film Festival, Gig Harbor Film Festival, Port Townsend Film Festival, LA Femme Film Festival, The Unmentionables Film Festival of NYC, and DocMiami International Film Festival, where it was nominated for the Best Documentary (Contemporary Issue) award. Hot Flash Havoc won the AASECT Award for 'Best Audio Visual for Sexual Health' from the American Association of Sexuality Educators, Counselors and Therapists in 2011. The film aired nationwide on PBS in 2016.
