= Disciples of Babylon =

American rock band

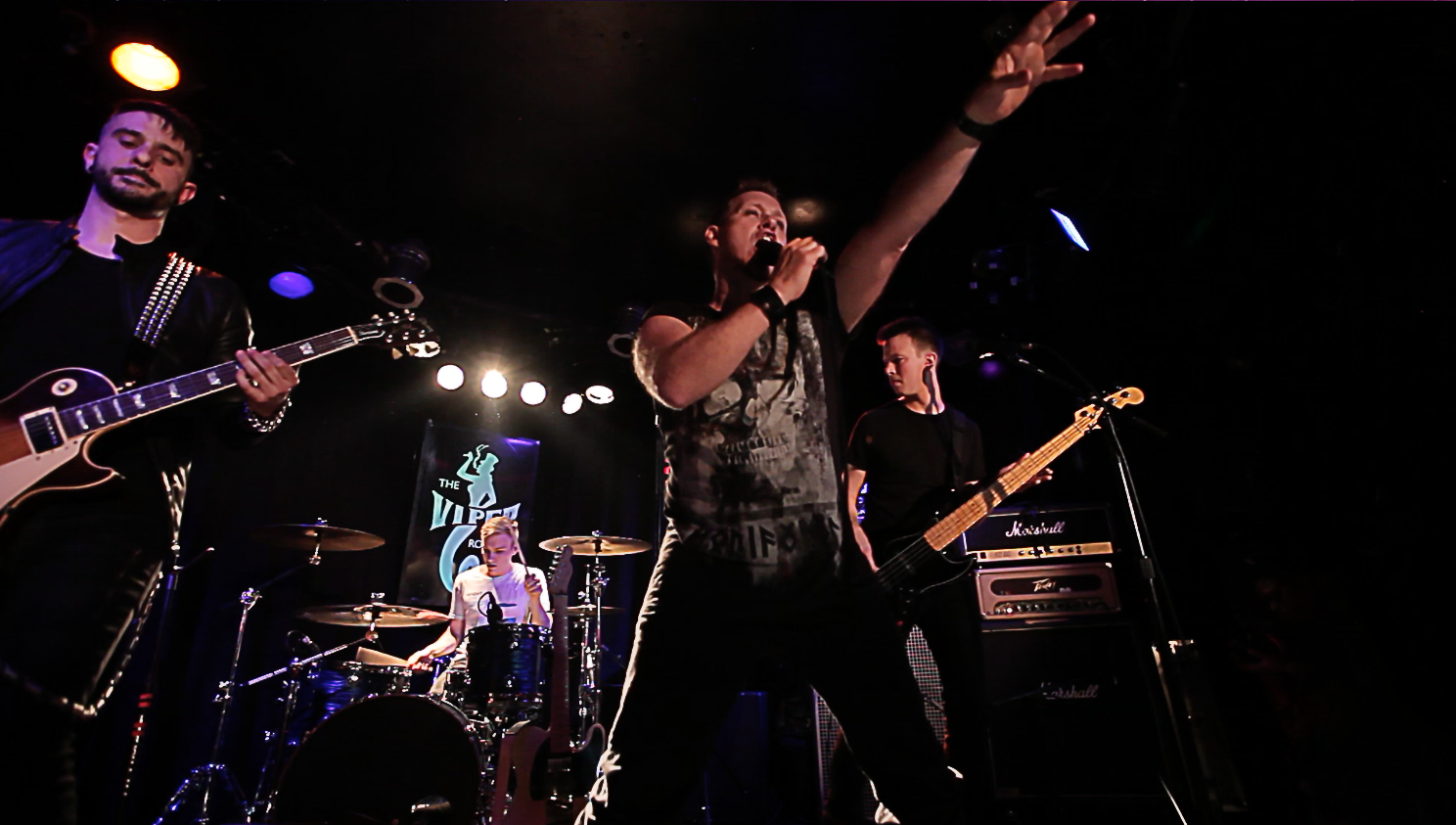
- Disciples of Babylon in 2016

Background information
- Origin: Hollywood, California
- Genres: Hard rock Alternative rock Progressive rock
- Label: Symbiotic Records
- Members: Eric Knight; Ramon Blanco; Gui Bodi; Chris Toeller

Disciples of Babylon is an American rock band based in Hollywood consisting of Eric Knight, Ramon Blanco, Gui Bodi, and Chris Toeller. The band was founded in 2012, and released their first EP Welcome to Babylon in 2015. Their first studio album The Rise and Fall of Babylon was released in 2017. They broke up in 2021.

== History ==
=== 2012–2015: Formation and Welcome to Babylon ===
Disciples of Babylon was founded in 2012 by lead singer and guitarist Eric Knight. Knight invited guitarist Ramon Blanco to join the band after watching Blanco perform a guitar solo of Alter Bridge's "Blackbird" online. Knight and Blanco began writing music together immediately, and wrote the song "Arrived" during their first writing session.

Bassist Gui Bodi and drummer Chris Toeller subsequently joined the band. Bodi had met Knight and Blanco at the Musicians Institute, which they all attended.

Disciples of Babylon is not a religious band, although its music does include political and social commentary. The band's name is a reference to America being a modern-day Babylon.

Disciples of Babylon's first EP Welcome to Babylon was produced with the assistance of producer Andrés Torres. The 3-track EP was released in the United States on September 5, 2015.

=== 2015–2017: The Rise and Fall of Babylon, Dew Tour 2017 ===
In 2017, Disciples of Babylon went on tour as part of the extreme sport Dew Tour. Disciples of Babylon announced The Rise and Fall of Babylon, their first studio album. The album's lead single, "Without You", was released on July 24, 2017.

The Rise and Fall of Babylon was released in October 2017 to generally positive reviews. The album was premiered at The Viper Room in West Hollywood, California on October 6.

=== 2020–present: Upcoming album ===
Disciples of Babylon released "Liberty", their first song in three years, on October 30, 2020. In 2021/2022, Eric Knight posted that he would be stepping down as lead singer for the band. Since then the band has been on hiatus for an indefinite amount of time.

== Discography ==
=== Albums ===
- The Rise and Fall of Babylon (2017)
- Welcome to Babylon (2015)

=== Singles ===
- "Liberty"
- "Without You"
- "Karma"
