= MubuTV =

American music business news network

MUBUTV
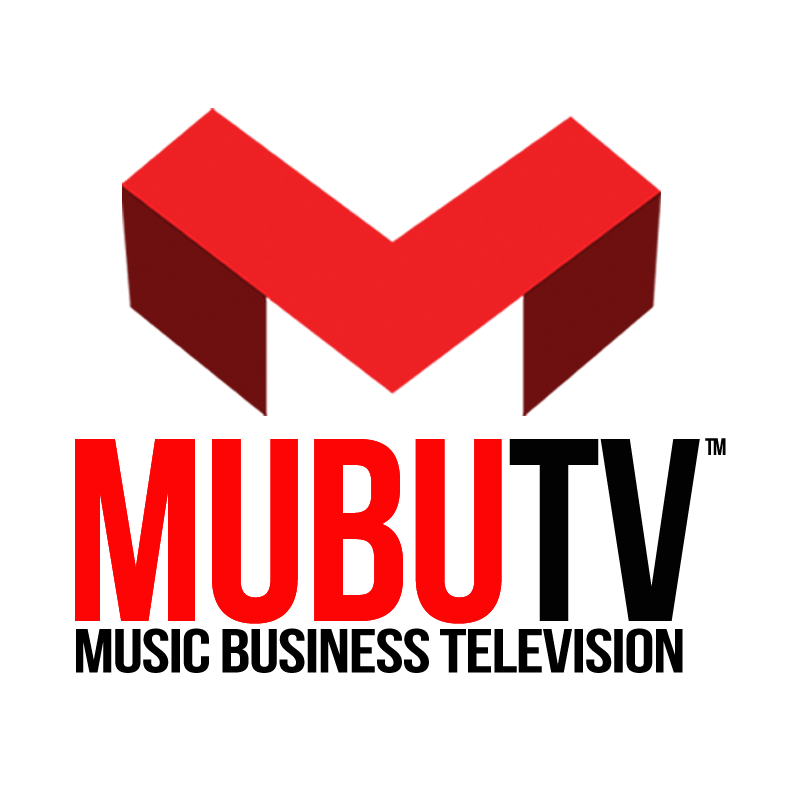
- Type: Private
- Industry: Music business
- Founder: Ritch Esra; Eric Knight
- Headquarters: Los Angeles
- Website: www.mubutv.com

MUBUTV is an American media network that produces news and original programming about the global music industry.

== History ==
MUBUTV was founded in 2012 by Ritch Esra and Eric Knight. The name is short for "Music Business Television". The network went on hiatus during the COVID-19 pandemic and was relaunched on February 28, 2023.

MUBUTV produces music industry news segments, instructional programs for recording artists and live streaming events. The network produces the Insider Series, which airs weekly interviews and programs with experts in A&R, music publishing and marketing. Featured guests on the network have included Mike Clink, John Kalodner, Ari Herstand, Kevin Lyman, Shelly Peiken, and Michael Chugg. MUBUTV also hosts the Insider Podcast which has had such celebrity guests as Clive Davis. The network also hosts a Featured Artist series of music videos from new artists.
