= Peter Nashel =

American composer

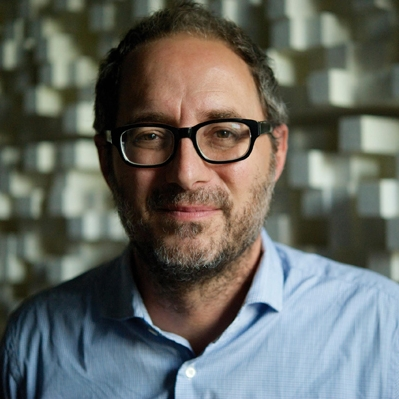

Background information
- Born: Ridgewood, New Jersey, U.S.
- Genre: Film score
- Occupation: Composer
- Years active: 1988–present

Peter Nashel is an American composer. He has composed scores for a number of films and television series including, I, Tonya, Marco Polo, and Totally Under Control. He is the founder and principal of the music production company, duotone audio group.

== Early life and education ==
Nashel was born and grew up in Ridgewood, New Jersey. He studied at both the Tanglewood Institute in Boston and the Eastman School of Music in Rochester, New York, before moving on to Wesleyan University in Connecticut. At Wesleyan, he studied under Bill Barron and graduated in 1988.

== Career ==
Nashel has worked on numerous film and television scores. In 2001, he earned his first screen credit as composer for his work on the Sundance award-winning feature film, The Deep End, starring Tilda Swinton. In the ensuing years, he composed the music for several features including Bee Season, the 2005 film adaptation of the novel of the same name, written by Naomi Foner Gyllenhaal and starring Richard Gere and Juliette Binoche, The Night Listener (2006), based on Armistead Maupin’s novel of the same name and starring Robin Williams and Toni Collette, the academy-award winning documentary film No End in Sight (2007) and the 2009 thriller Carriers. More recently, he scored the 2017 Oscar-winning black comedy, I, Tonya directed by Craig Gillespie and Book Club (2018), starring Jane Fonda, Diane Keaton, Mary Steenburgen, and Candace Bergen.

He has also worked on numerous television and documentary projects. He composed scores for the TV series Dirty Sexy Money (2007–2009), Rubicon (2010), Lie to Me (2010–2011), Marco Polo (2014–2016), Mike (2022) and Alaska Daily (2022), among others. His documentary work includes Freakonomics (2010), Totally Under Control (2020), The Crime of the Century (2021) and Boom! Boom! The World vs. Boris Becker.

== Selected filmography ==
As Composer

Year	Title	Note
2001	The Deep End	Feature film
2002	The Trials of Henry Kissinger	Documentary film
2005	Bee Season	Feature film
2006	The Night Listener	Feature film
2006	Wedding Daze	Feature film
2006–2012	Iconoclasts	Docuseries
2007	No End in Sight	Documentary film
2007–2009	Dirty Sexy Money	23 Episodes
2008	New York, I Love You	Feature film
2008–2009	Life on Mars	17 Episodes
2009	Carriers	Feature film
2009	Client 9: The Rise and Fall of Eliot Spitzer	Documentary film
2010	Freakonomics	Documentary film
2010	Rubicon	12 Episodes
2010–2011	Lie to Me	13 Episodes
2012	Park Avenue: Money, Power and the American Dream	Documentary film
2013	The Trials of Cate McCall	Feature film
2014	Dukhtar	Feature film
2014–2016	Marco Polo	20 Episodes
2015	Younger	12 Episodes
2016–2017	Incorporated	10 Episodes
2017	I, Tonya	Feature film
2018	Nigerian Prince	Feature film
2018	Book Club	Feature film
2019	30 for 30 : Qualified	Documentary film
2020	The Innocence Files	Docuseries
2020	Totally Under Control	Documentary film
2021	The Crime of the Century	Documentary film
2022	Mike	8 Episodes
2022	The Magic of Passion	Short film
2022–2023	Alaska Daily	11 Episodes
2023	Boom! Boom! The World vs. Boris Becker	2 Episodes

== Awards and nominations ==
Year	Result	Award	Category	Work	Ref.
2019	Won	BMI Film & TV Awards	Film Music	Book Club	
2020	Nominated	Critics' Choice Documentary Awards	Best Score	Totally Under Control	
