= Crock of Gold: A Few Rounds with Shane MacGowan =

2020 documentary film

- Theatrical release poster
- Directed by: Julien Temple
- Written by: Julien Temple
- Produced by: Johnny Depp; Stephen Deuters; Stephen Malit; Julien Temple
- Cinematography: Steve Organ
- Edited by: Caroline Richards
- Production companies: Infinitum Nihil; Nitrate Film; HanWay Films; BBC Music; Warner Music Entertainment
- Distributed by: Magnolia Pictures (US and Canada); Altitude Films (UK and Ireland); Wildcard Distribution (Ireland)
- Release dates: 20 September 2020 (Zinemaldia); 4 December 2020
- Running time: 124 minutes
- Country: United Kingdom
- Language: English

Crock of Gold: A Few Rounds with Shane MacGowan is a 2020 documentary film about the life of Shane MacGowan, the lead singer and songwriter of The Pogues who fused punk rock with Irish folk music and whose biggest hit was the Christmas song Fairytale of New York. The film was written and directed by Julien Temple and produced by Johnny Depp.

The world premiere of the documentary was on 20 September 2020 at the 68th San Sebastián International Film Festival where it was nominated for the Golden Shell award for Best Film and won the runner-up "Special Jury Prize". It was also nominated for Best Music Documentary at the 2020 5th Critics' Choice Documentary Awards and 2020 36th International Documentary Association Awards.

Magnolia Pictures acquired the North American distribution rights. The North American premiere was on 11 November 2020, at DOC NYC followed by special screenings in theatres in the U.S. on 1 December 2020, before its general release on 4 December 2020. The film was distributed by Wildcard Distribution in Irish cinemas and by Altitude Films in the UK and Ireland. The release in UK and Ireland cinemas by the two distributors was delayed from 20 November 2020 to 4 December 2020 due to COVID-19. The film was released on demand and DVD in the U.S. and Canada on 4 December 2020 and in the UK and Ireland on 7 December 2020. The film was released in theaters in Canada on 4 December 2020 and released in Australia on 17 December 2020. BBC4 broadcast the film on 16 March 2021. The film was shown in cinemas around the U.S. but not in New York City due to the city’s COVID shutdown of cinemas. After MacGowan's death on 30 November 2023, the IFC Center presented the first New York theatrical screenings from 25 December to 26 December 2023 as a tribute on what would have been his 66th birthday.

== Premise ==
The story is told by MacGowan, friends and family members.
