= Totally Under Control =

2020 film about the Trump administration's handling of the COVID-19 pandemic

- Official promotional poster
- Directed by: Alex Gibney; Ophelia Harutyunyan; Suzanne Hillinger
- Written by: Alex Gibney
- Produced by: Alex Gibney; Ophelia Harutyunyan; Suzanne Hillinger
- Narrated by: Alex Gibney
- Cinematography: Ben Bloodwell
- Edited by: Lindy Jankura; Alex Keipper
- Music by: Peter Nashel; Brian Deming
- Production companies: Jigsaw Productions; Play/Action Pictures; Participant; Yellow Bear Films
- Distributed by: Neon
- Release date: October 13, 2020 (United States)
- Running time: 123 minutes
- Country: United States
- Language: English

Totally Under Control is a 2020 American documentary film directed and produced by Alex Gibney, Ophelia Harutyunyan and Suzanne Hillinger, from a screenplay by Gibney. It follows the Trump administration's response to the COVID-19 pandemic in the United States, often comparing the American response to that of South Korea. It was released on October 13, 2020, by Neon.

== Production ==
Alex Gibney initially pitched the idea of making a documentary about the COVID-19 pandemic and rushing it for release prior to the presidential election to the head of Neon, Tom Quinn, who liked the idea. Gibney knew by working on a tight deadline he could not complete the film himself bringing on co-directors Ophelia Harutyunyan and Suzanne Hillinger. Gibney decided to make the film in April after a friend of his had died from COVID-19 and another friend was on a ventilator, feeling as though the United States government failed to contain and control the virus.

Due to the pandemic making it difficult to film, cinematographer Ben Bloodwell came up with a kit called "COVID-cam" that was sent to subjects in the film, which they would pick up and begin recording themselves. The kit, consisting of a DSLR camera and microphone, once connected to the Internet, would allow Bloodwell to see the image and control and adjust the camera settings. With some subjects, the crew would rent out an Airbnb and isolate a portion of the room for the crew using a plastic shower curtain, while the interviewee would sit on the other side.

== Release ==
In September 2020, Neon acquired distribution rights to the film. It was released on October 13, 2020.

== Reception ==
On the review aggregator Rotten Tomatoes, Totally Under Control holds an approval rating of 99% based on 102 reviews, with an average of 7.7/10. The website's critics consensus reads: "Totally Under Control does a commendable job of distilling current events into a clear-eyed overview that's as engaging as it is enraging." On Metacritic, the film has a weighted average score of 80 out of 100, based on 26 critics, indicating "generally favorable reviews".

Ann Hornaday of The Washington Post gave the film a score of 3/4 stars, describing it as an "incisive, lucid and infuriating critique of the Trump administration's handling of the coronavirus pandemic", and concluded: "Should open-minded viewers decide to watch Totally Under Control, they're likely to feel snapped awake, as if from a long, horrifying national trance." Simon Houpt of The Globe and Mail also gave the film a score of 3/4 stars, and described it as "a totally enraging documentary about the Trump administration’s flaccid response to the coronavirus emergency in the U.S." Kevin Maher of The Times gave the film a score of 4/5 stars, writing: "It's sobering, often indecently gripping material that, in broad strokes, confirms widely circulated impressions of the Trump White House as a nest of kleptocratic science-bashing vipers."

Danny Leigh of the Financial Times gave the film a score of 4/5 stars, describing it as "A definitively American story - what happens when the desire to be free from government extends to government itself, as nearly 8m people sicken." Shirley Li of The Atlantic wrote: "Viewers may have grown numb to the constant churn of distressing news and learned to stomach the administration’s failure to contain the virus. But Totally Under Control refuses to look away, and being reminded of how many warnings went unheeded is unnerving." Brian Lowry of CNN described the film as "in some ways, a greatest-hits collection of Trump administration failures and missteps pertaining to Covid-19". Sam Adams of Slate said that the film told "the story of a disaster that everyone saw coming and let happen anyway."

Charles Bramesco of The Guardian gave the film a score of 3/5 stars, describing it as a "damning, if frustratingly incomplete, timeline of a government ill-equipped to deal with a deadly pandemic". K. Austin Collins of Rolling Stone wrote that the film "makes the whole of this crisis feel explicable... With the tragedy of the pandemic still ongoing, and thus still fresh, it also proves gratingly impersonal", but added: "It’s a fine placeholder for a real reckoning, a nicely-plated appetizer, a studious demonstration of how to read, collate, and repackage the news."
