= Shirlee Taylor Haizlip =

American non-fiction author (born 1937)

- Born: 1937 (age 87–88); Stratford, Connecticut, U.S.
- Occupation: Author
- Spouse: Dr. Harold Haizlip
- Children: Melissa Haizlip

Shirlee Taylor Haizlip (born 1937) is an American non-fiction author. She has written three books, The Sweeter the Juice, A Memoir in Black and White, In the Garden of Our Dreams, co-authored with her husband, Harold C. Haizlip, and Finding Grace.

== Biography ==
Haizlip was born in Stratford, Connecticut and grew up in Ansonia, Connecticut. She graduated from Wellesley College, taught sociology at Tufts University and studied Urban Planning at the Harvard University School of Design. Haizlip was the first woman to manage a CBS television affiliate, WBNB-TV in St. Thomas, U.S. Virgin Islands. From there she went to WNET TV, Channel 13 in New York City and became one of its corporate officers. Haizlip moved to Los Angeles, California in 1989 to become the National Director of the National Center for Film and Video Preservation at the American Film Institute, an organization which advocated and distributed funding for more than 139 film archives around the country. Haizlip left the Preservation Center to begin writing her book, The Sweeter the Juice.

In 2000, she was the first African-American to be appointed president of the Ebell Society of Los Angeles. She was again appointed president in 2010.

Haizlip married Harold C. Haizlip in 1959 and the couple had two daughters.

== Books ==
Sweeter the Juice was a "notable book of the year", and was awarded the Simon Wiesenthal Center's Bruno Brand Award as best book on tolerance in 1995. In recognition of the importance of the book, The University of New Haven honored Haizlip an Honorary Doctorate of Humane Letters. The book is regularly taught in high schools across the country, and is required reading in numerous college courses.
