= Gunda (2020 film) =

2020 documentary film

- Theatrical release poster
- Directed by: Viktor Kossakovsky
- Written by: Viktor Kossakovsky; Ainara Vera
- Produced by: Anita Rehoff Larsen
- Cinematography: Egil Håskjold Larsen; Viktor Kossakovsky
- Edited by: Viktor Kossakovsky; Ainara Vera
- Production companies: Louverture Films; Sant & Usant; Norwegian Film Institute; Storyline; Fritt Ord; Artemis Rising Foundation
- Distributed by: Neon
- Release dates: February 23, 2020 (Berlinale); April 16, 2021 (United States)
- Running time: 97 minutes
- Countries: United States; Norway
- Box office: $242,100

Gunda (also known as Gunda: Mother, Pig) is a 2020 documentary film directed, co-written, and co-edited by Viktor Kossakovsky. The film follows the daily life of a pig, two cows, and a one-legged chicken. Joaquin Phoenix serves as an executive producer.

The film had its world premiere at the Berlin International Film Festival on February 23, 2020. It was released in the United States on April 16, 2021, by Neon.

== Synopsis ==
Shot in black-and-white and without dialogue, the film follows the daily life of Gunda — a sow and her piglets, two cows, and a one-legged chicken. A note during the credits indicates that the documentary was filmed in farms and sanctuaries in Norway, Spain, and the UK.

== Release ==
The film had its world premiere at the Berlin International Film Festival on February 23, 2020. Shortly after, Neon acquired North American distribution rights to the film. It screened at the New York Film Festival on September 19, 2020 and at the Adelaide Film Festival in October 2020. The film was released in the United States on April 16, 2021.

== Critical reception ==
Gunda received positive reviews from film critics. It holds a 98% approval rating on review aggregator website Rotten Tomatoes, based on 95 reviews, with an average of 8.1/10. The site's critical consensus reads, "Gunda takes an absorbingly meditative look at farm life from the animals' perspective, tacitly posing questions about our relationship to food along the way." Metacritic reports a score of 89 out of 100, based on 26 reviews, indicating "universal acclaim".

Writing for The New York Times Manohla Dargis describes the documentary as "sublimely beautiful and profoundly moving". Similarly, Eric Kohn of IndieWire praised the documentary, describing it as "a visionary case for veganism in black and white." Guy Lodge of Variety says the film's "radiantly beautiful imagery and gently immersive storytelling aren’t in service of a single browbeating message, but a broader, holistic view of where we and the animals we rear, use and consume fit into a single circle of life."
