= The Fight (2020 film) =

2020 American documentary film

- Release poster
- Directed by: Eli Despres; Josh Kriegman; Elyse Steinberg
- Produced by: Eli Despres; Josh Kriegman; Elyse Steinberg; Peggy Drexler; Maya Seidler; Kerry Washington
- Cinematography: Sean McGing
- Edited by: Eli Despres; Greg Finton; Kim Roberts
- Music by: Juan Luqui
- Production companies: Simpson Street; Drexler Films; Bow and Arrow Entertainment; Edgeline Films; JustFilms; Ford Foundation
- Distributed by: Magnolia Pictures; Topic Studios
- Release dates: January 24, 2020 (Sundance); July 31, 2020 (United States)
- Running time: 96 minutes
- Country: United States
- Language: English

The Fight is a 2020 American documentary film directed and produced by Eli Despres, Josh Kriegman and Elyse Steinberg. Kerry Washington serves as a producer under her Simpson Street banner. It follows legal battles that lawyers for the American Civil Liberties Union (ACLU) had faced during the Trump administration.

The film had its world premiere at the Sundance Film Festival on January 24, 2020, where it won the U.S. Documentary Special Jury Award for Social Impact Filmmaking. It was released in the United States on July 31, 2020, by Magnolia Pictures and Topic Studios.

== Premise ==
The film follows five legal battles brought by the American Civil Liberties Union (ACLU) against various Trump administration policies. The lawsuits regard:

1. Opposition to the Trump travel ban, brought by Lee Gelernt
2. Pursuit of abortion access for immigrants in ICE custody, brought by Brigitte Amiri
3. A challenge to the proposed citizenship question on the census, brought by Dale Ho
4. Rejection of the Trump order banning transgender personnel in the military, brought by Chase Strangio
5. An attempt to reunite families separated at the border, brought by Lee Gelernt

== Release ==
The Fight had its world premiere at the Sundance Film Festival on January 24, 2020. Shortly thereafter, Magnolia Pictures and Topic Studios acquired distribution rights to the film. It was released in 10 indoor theaters in the United States and on VOD platforms on July 31, 2020.

== Critical reception ==
On the review aggregator website Rotten Tomatoes, the film holds an approval rating of 99% based on 67 reviews, with an average of 7.8/10. The website's critics consensus reads, "The Fight takes an engaging look at some of the people working on the front lines for the ACLU – and makes a passionate case for the legal battles they wage." On Metacritic, the film holds a rating of 73 out of 100, based on 23 critics, indicating "generally favorable" reviews.

At the 2020 Sundance Film Festival, the film won the U.S. Documentary Special Jury Award for Social Impact Filmmaking.
