= Eric Knight (musician) =

American singer-songwriter

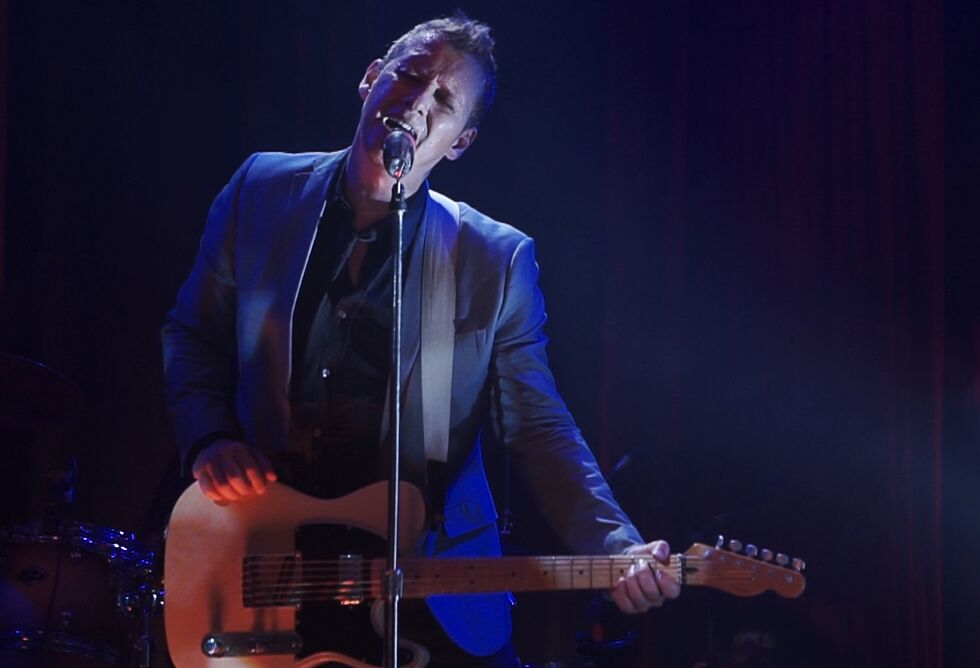
- Eric Knight performing 2015

Background information
- Born: Eric Diaz; Hialeah, Florida, USA
- Genres: Rock, Hard Rock
- Occupations: Singer-songwriter, multi-instrumentalist, composer, lyricist, record producer, actor, artist manager, entrepreneur, music industry consultant, conference speaker and music education advocate
- Instruments: Vocals, guitar, bass guitar, drums, percussion, piano
- Years active: 1995–present
- Labels: 28 Records, Symbiotic Records
- Website: ericknightonline.com www.persistentmanagement.com www.symbioticnation.com

Eric Knight is an American singer-songwriter, multi-instrumentalist, record producer, artist manager, entrepreneur, and entertainment industry professional originally from the Miami suburb of Hialeah. He is founder and CEO of Persistent Management, an artist management agency and co-founder of MUBUTV. He was the founder and lead singer of Disciples of Babylon from 2015 to 2021.

== Early life ==
Eric Knight is the son of Cuban immigrants, Carlos Diaz, former rhythm guitarist for the Miami-based band Shango, and Nerida Diaz. At age 13, Knight was performing in night clubs in the greater Miami area.

== Music career ==
=== Vandal ===
Eric Knight was the lead singer of the Miami hard rock act Vandal from 1990 to 1995. In 1990 he met John Tovar who had discovered and was managing Marilyn Manson and The Mavericks, and was interested in working with Knight's band. Tovar ultimately took on Vandal as one of his new clients. Knight then became the publicist, booking agent, fan club organizer, and spokesperson for the band. In 1991 John Tovar left as manager and Knight took control of managerial responsibilities for the group. Vandal's 1994 release Julian Day credited Persistent (see below) as the group's official management. Vandal disbanded in 1995 due to creative differences.

=== Disciples of Babylon ===
In 2012 he formed rock group Disciples of Babylon and is the band's lead singer and rhythm guitarist. In January 2015 the band released their first single entitled Karma, from the group's debut EP Welcome to Babylon. Welcome to Babylon was due out in the spring of 2015. They subsequently released The Rise and Fall of Babylon (2017) before disbanding in 2021.

=== Solo career ===
Knight released his debut album Near Life Experience in October 1998. He wrote and arranged all of the tracks and also co-produced the album with Keith Rose at Criteria Studios in North Miami. The album went on to spawn the first single and video for Play On Words which received substantial airplay internationally and favorable reviews.

In 1999 while promoting his album, Knight opened for the Dave Matthews Band and began in music education with Music Business 101, speaking at 20 high schools in South Florida. Knight has also conducted workshops and guest spoke at Berklee College of Music in Boston and Musicians Institute in Los Angeles.

Knight contributed Foolin to the Def Leppard tribute album Tributized: Tribute to Def Leppard which was released in 2000. In the summer of that same year, Knight opened for Kiss (band) on the Florida leg of the Kiss Farewell Tour.

In 2001, Eric Knight performed a songwriter showcase for BMI after the September 11 attacks in New York City.

He released his second album Fractured Fairy Tales in 2002 with engineer and co-producer Keith Rose. Singles Silly Love Song and Crux of the Matter then received airplay nationally and internationally. In October 2002 Knight opened for Aerosmith and Kid Rock for the Girls of Summer Tour.

Knight relocated to Los Angeles in 2006, where he arranged a new band lineup and performed across the Los Angeles/Hollywood club circuit.

In 2008, Knight accepted the L.A. Rockies award in Hollywood for Best Male Solo Artist after receiving the most votes in his category from the public. In September he organized a series of concerts in Los Angeles, including the City Of Nations industry showcase which consisted of several bands and artists from different countries.

Knight later began working on his third studio album titled Delusions Of Grandeur.

On April 12, 2024, Knight released the single "Out Of This World". Its release was accompanied by a music video and a limited edition CD. The song's narrative is heavily inspired by science fiction and theories about extraterrestrial life, using alien abduction as a metaphor for loneliness and depression. Part of its inspiration came from Knight's own experiences with depression and feeling isolated during the COVID-19 pandemic. Knight stated that the original demo was "incredibly sad" but his collaboration with Shawn Zuzek gave the final version a more uplifting, "arena-ready" production.

== Music industry career ==
In February 2008 Eric Knight began working on a new entertainment company titled Symbiotic Nation. His plans for the organization included creating an interconnected structure of industry channels that can be used by artists to better connect with entertainment industry officials. The launch of the company also includes sister divisions Symbiotic Records and Symbiotic Agency. In April of the same year, Knight launched his own entertainment management company Persistent Management. Knight worked with several independent Los Angeles area bands before managing Latin pop-rock artist, Ignacio Val.

Since 2008 Eric Knight provided articles, interviews, and expertise for journalists and authors regarding his personal experiences as an entrepreneur in the music industry, including contributions to author Neil Tortorella's Starting Your Career As A Musician; Times Beach magazine; and Making Music magazine.

Eric Knight is a voting member of both the National Academy of Recording Arts and Sciences and the Latin Academy of Recording Arts & Sciences Grammy Award boards. Knight also works with Grammy Award-winning Jazz guitarist, Norman Brown, on media related projects. He has also been in the process of authoring his first industry related book entitled How To Manage Your Career in the New Music Industry.

=== MUBUTV ===
During the summer of 2012, Eric co-founded the music industry media network MUBUTV (Music Business Television) with music industry expert Ritch Esra. He has since overseen creative direction and development of all of MUBUTV's productions including its flagship program The Insider Series, which features interviews with industry professionals including Kenny Werner, Eric Sheinkop, John Houlihan and Tom Callahan. The network went on hiatus during the COVID-19 pandemic and returned in February 2024.

== Discography ==
- Near Life Experience (1998)
- Tributized (Def Leppard Tribute album) (2000)
- Fractured Fairy Tales (2002)
- Delusions Of Grandeur (TBA)
