= Mr. Soul! =

2018 film by Melissa Haizlip

- Theatrical release poster
- Directed by: Melissa Haizlip
- Written by: Melissa Haizlip
- Produced by: Melissa Haizlip
- Starring: Harry Belafonte; Felipe Luciano; Dr, Harold Haizlip; Nikki Giovanni; Ashford & Simpson Ronald Bell; Questlove; Novella Nelson; Stan Lathan; Carmen De Lavallade; Dr. Loretta Long; Black Ivory; Kathleen Cleaver; Sonia Sanchez; The Last Poets; Greg Tate; Kevin Powell; Christopher Lukas; Chester Higgins Jr. Alvin Francis Poussaint; Louis J. Massiah
- Narrated by: Blair Underwood
- Cinematography: Hans Charles
- Edited by: Giovanni P. Autran; Annukka Lilja; Blair McClendon
- Music by: Robert Glasper
- Production companies: Shoes In The Bed Productions, LLC
- Distributed by: Shoes In The Bed Productions, LLC; Open Your Eyes & Think MF
- Release dates: April 22, 2018 (Tribeca Film Festival); August 28, 2020 (United States); August 22, 2021 (HBO Max)
- Running time: 104 minutes
- Country: United States
- Language: English

Mr. Soul! (stylized as Mr. SOUL!) is a 2018 American documentary film produced, written and directed by documentary filmmaker Melissa Haizlip. The film was co-produced by Doug Blush and co-directed by Sam Pollard. The film tells the story of Ellis Haizlip, the producer and host of SOUL!, the music-and-talk program that aired on public television from 1968 to 1973 and aimed at a Black audience. It was released in 2018 and has since received 21 filmmaking awards. Attorney Chaz Ebert, record executive Ron Gillyard, producer and director Stan Lathan, producer Rishi Rajani, producer Stephanie T. Rance, actor Blair Underwood and screenwriter, producer and actress Lena Waithe are the executive producers of the film.

In March 2021, it was announced by the Academy of Motion Pictures Arts & Sciences that “Show Me Your Soul” was on the 93rd Oscars shortlist for Best Original Song.

On June 6, 2022 Academy Award winning actor Morgan Freeman announced that Mr. Soul! won the Peabody Award for Best Documentary.

== Synopsis ==
The film explores the five seasons of SOUL! against the backdrop of a swiftly changing political landscape. The film interweaves archival footage with rare performances and interviews from the SOUL! show, contemporary interviews with guests who appeared on SOUL! a Black women-led crew working behind-the-scenes including Harry Belafonte, Nikki Giovanni, The Last Poets, Ashford & Simpson, Black Ivory, Sonia Sanchez, Carmen De Lavallade, Felipe Luciano, and Ronald Bell of Kool & the Gang. SOUL! gave exposure to popular stars like Stevie Wonder, Wilson Pickett, Al Green and Earth, Wind & Fire and underground artists, including McCoy Tyner and the saxophonist Rahsaan Roland Kirk, and authors like James Baldwin and Toni Morrison, and activists including Kathleen Cleaver of the Black Panther Party and Stokely Carmichael (Kwame Ture).

The words of Ellis Haizlip are taken from interviews, news articles, correspondence and journal entries between 1968 and 1973. Ellis Haizlip's words are voiced by the actor Blair Underwood, who also serves as an executive producer on the film.

“The primary purpose of Soul! is neither to educate nor entertain, but to give people a chance to share in the Black experience. The show must do that first. Then it can educate and entertain. Soul! makes Blacks visible in a society where they have been largely invisible.” Ellis Haizlip 1968.

== Release ==
On April 22, 2018, Mr. SOUL! premiered at the 2018 Tribeca Film Festival. The film was screened at 50 film festivals in 2018 and 2019 including AFI DOCS, BFI London, Heartland International Film Festival, Hot Docs, Indie Memphis, Martha's Vineyard African American Film Festival, True / False Film Festival, Urbanworld Film Festival, Woodstock Film Festival, and Pan African Film Festival, among others, and won more than 18 awards. On August 28, 2020, Mr. SOUL! was released in limited theaters and virtual cinemas.

Mr. SOUL!, made its public television debut on February 22, 2021, on PBS.

HBO Max announced, Mr. Soul! will premiere on their streaming service on August 1, 2021.

=== Critical reception ===
Mr. Soul! has received positive reviews and has a 96% rating on Rotten Tomatoes based on 27 critic reviews, summarizing: "Mr. SOUL! aims an overdue spotlight on a groundbreaking chapter in the history of American public television – and the host who helped make it all happen."

=== End Title Song ===
"Show Me Your Soul" is the end title song by Grammy Award winners Lalah Hathaway and Robert Glasper. The song, which is also written by Hathaway and Glasper along with Muhammad Ayers and Melissa Haizlip was on the shortlist for the 93rd Academy Awards in the category of Music (Best Original Song).

== Cast ==
- Blair Underwood as Voice of Ellis Haizlip
- Questlove
- Novella Nelson
- Stan Lathan
- Carmen De Lavallade
- Dr. Loretta Long
- Kathleen Cleaver
- Ronald Bell
- Kool & The Gang
- Melba Moore
- Nikki Giovanni
- Ashford & Simpson
- Sonia Sanchez
- Felipe Luciano
- Louis J. Massiah
- Black Ivory
- Alvin F. Poussaint
- The Last Poets
- Greg Tate
- Christopher Lukas
- Chester Higgins Jr.
- George Faison
- Gayle Wald
- Dr. Billy Taylor
- Sarah Lewis
- Sylvia Waters
- Judith Jamison
- Robert Thompson
- Sade Lythcott
- Obba Babatunde
- David Adams Leeming
- Leroy Burgess
- Stuart Bascombe
- Russell Patterson
- Dr. Harold Haizlip
- Alice LaBrie
- Rev. Dr. Cheryl Sanders
- Beth Ausbrooks
- Mary Wilburn
- Leslie Demus

Archival footage

- Ellis Haizlip
- Harry Belafonte
- Anna Maria Horsford
- Sidney Poitier
- Patti LaBelle
- Sarah Dash
- Stevie Wonder
- Gladys Knight
- Maya Angelou
- Bill Withers
- James Baldwin
- Earth Wind & Fire
- Al Green
- Cicely Tyson
- B.B. King
- Donny Hathaway
- Hugh Masekela
- Arsenio Hall
- Muhammad Ali
- The Delfonics
- Mandrill
- New Birth
- Black Ivory
- Tito Puente
- Stokely Carmichael
- Miriam Makeba
- Minister Louis Farrakhan

== Awards and accolades ==
Mr. SOUL! received 32 Nominations and won 21 awards including 14 Film Festival Awards.

On April 13, 2022, Mr. SOUL! was nominated for a 2022 Peabody Award in the category of Best Documentary. On June 6, 2022, actor Morgan Freeman announced that Mr. Soul! won the Peabody Award for Best Documentary.

Accolades
Awards / Film Festival	Category	Result
2022 Peabody Awards	Best Documentary	Won
2021 Black Reel Awards	Outstanding Independent Documentary	Won
2021 Guild of Music Supervisors Awards	Best Music Supervision for a Documentary - Ed Gerrard	Nominated
2021 NAACP Image Awards	Outstanding Documentary (Film)	Nominated
2021 NAACP Image Awards	Outstanding Writing in a Documentary (Television or Motion Picture) - Melissa Haizlip - Writer	Won
2021 NAACP Image Awards	Outstanding Breakthrough Creative (Motion Picture) - Melissa Haizlip	Nominated
2021 Cinema Eye Honors	Outstanding Debut Feature	Nominated
2020 Critics' Choice Documentary Awards	Best First Documentary Feature	Won
2020 Critics' Choice Documentary Awards	Best Documentary Feature	Nominated
2020 Critics' Choice Documentary Awards	Best Narration - Blair Underwood - Narrator, Melissa Haizlip - Writer	Nominated
2020 Critics' Choice Documentary Awards	Best Archival Documentary	Nominated
2020 Critics' Choice Documentary Awards	Best Historical - Biographical Documentary	Nominated
2019 FOCAL International Awards	Best Use of Footage in an Entertainment Production	Won
2019 FOCAL International Awards	Student Jury Award for Most Inspiring Use of Archive	Won
2019 FOCAL International Awards	Best Use of Footage in a History Feature	Nominated
2019 FOCAL International Awards	Best Use of Footage in an Arts Production	Nominated
2019 Library of Congress Lavine / Ken Burns Prize for Film	Finalist	Won
2018 International Documentary Association Awards	Best Music Documentary	Won
2018 AFI Docs Festival	Audience Award - Best Feature Documentary	Won
2018 All Genders, Lifestyles, and Identities Film Festival (aGLIFF)	Jury Award - Best Documentary	Won
2018 All Genders, Lifestyles, and Identities Film Festival (aGLIFF)	Audience Award - Best Documentary	Won
2018 Dallas DocuFest	Meta Media Award	Won
2018 Hot Docs Canadian International Documentary Festival	Audience Award - Top 20 Audience Favorites	Nominated
2018 Indie Memphis Film Festival	Jury Award - Best Sounds Feature	Won
2018 Indie Memphis Film Festival	Audience Award - Best Sounds Feature	Won
2018 Martha's Vineyard African American Film Festival	HBO Jury Award - Best Documentary	Won
2018 Martha's Vineyard African American Film Festival	2018 Audience Award - Best Documentary	Won
2018 Out on Film Festival	Jury Award - Best Documentary	Won
2018 Out on Film Festival	Audience Award - Best Documentary	Won
2018 Pan African Film Festival	Jury Prize - Best Documentary	Won
2018 Sound Unseen Film & Music Festival	Special Jury Award	Won
2018 Urbanworld Film Festival	HBO Jury Award - Best Documentary	Won
2018 Woodstock Film Festival	Audience Award - Best Documentary	Won
