= Irwin C. Watson =

American comedian (1928–1999)

- Watson, c. 1970s
- Born: April 6, 1928; Brooklyn, New York City, US
- Died: February 13, 1999 (aged 70); Winter Park, Florida, US
- Occupation: Comedian

Irwin C. Watson (April 6, 1928 – February 13, 1999), was an American comedian known for his deadpan delivery. Born in Brooklyn, New-York, Watson joined and served the army after finishing high-school. Sometime after his service, Watson decided to become a stand-up comedian.

In the 1960s, Watson started to get to be noticed as an emcee and stand-up comedian, however it is his set on The Johnny Carson Show that got him wide recognition. From thereon, he continued doing stand-up comedy on a larger scale.

== Early life, army service, and start in comedy ==
Born on April 6, 1928, in Brooklyn, New-York, to West Indian immigrant parents.

After high school, he spent six years in the army, including 52 weeks in Germany. During his service, he was part of the Big Band where he played various instruments. When he returned to U.S., Watson started to work in a department store where he sold cameras and photographic equipment. On a night-out with friends, Watson was dared to pick up the microphone, when the club's emcee invited the patrons to showcase their talent. Watson said of the experience: “I was far from an instant hit, but that one exposure got in my blood. From then on I had show business fever”.

== Main career ==
In 1959, Watson had a break when he took over for Nipsey Russell, who turned down work at the Baby Grand club in Harlem.

In a 1962 Chicago Tribune article, he is described as a rising comedian.

In 1964, Watson was among the entertainers at the NAACP festival.

In 1965, Watson was the master of ceremony at the West Indie Calypso festival.

A 1969 article explains that Watson had his break on a one off appearance on The Johnny Carson Show, and ever since he's been popular in nightclub circuits.

Since his beginnings and movings forward, Watson performed stand-up comedy on the television showsThe Hollywood Palace, Kraft Music Hall, The Ed Sullivan Show, The Tonight Show, The Mike Douglas Show, etc. He was also a warmup act for musicians including Sammy Davis Jr., Paul Anka, Bobby Darin, Gladys Knight & the Pips, etc.

In the last 15 year of his life, Watson was a cruise line entertainer.

== Style ==
In a 1969 Chicago Tribune article, it says: "Irwin C. Watson is a deadpan comic with a nasty sense of humor". That same year in a Detroit Free Press article, Watson approach is described as "Watson works calmly, doesn't move much and rarely raises his voice or changes expression. If the front tables are empty he walks out where the people are." In another 1969 article by Pittsburgh Courier it is written "In the past eight years nobody has seen Irwin C. Watson laugh".

== Death ==
Watson fell ill while he was working with the Norwegian Cruise Line. Upon his return to the U.S., he was hospitalized at Winter Park Memorial Hospital and died of a heart attack on February 13, 1999.

== Personal ==
Prior to his death, Watson was married to Edlyne for 18 years. They had two children, Rowin and Regina.
