= Ellis Haizlip =

American television producer

- Ellis Haizlip on the set of his TV show SOUL!
- Born: September 21, 1929; Washington, D.C., U.S.
- Died: January 25, 1991 (aged 61); Washington, D.C., U.S.
- Occupation(s): Television and theatre producer, broadcaster
- Years active: 1954–1980s
- Notable work: Soul!

Ellis B. Haizlip (September 21, 1929 – January 25, 1991) was an American television and theatrical producer, broadcaster and promoter of African American culture. Haizlip is best known as the creator, producer and host of the television variety show, SOUL!

== Biography ==
He was born and grew up in Washington, D.C.. He attended Howard University, where he produced plays and theatre shows before graduating in 1954. He moved to New York City, and began producing plays with actors such as Vinnette Carroll, Cicely Tyson, Calvin Lockhart, and James Earl Jones, as well as performances by Alvin Ailey's dance company. He also produced shows in Europe and the Middle East, including plays by James Baldwin and Langston Hughes, as well as a concert tour by Marlene Dietrich.

In 1968, Haizlip created and executive produced Soul!, an arts program which became a showcase for many African American artists and musicians, such as Ashford and Simpson, Roberta Flack, and poet Nikki Giovanni. He also presented the show, after a few initial programs with other presenters. According to one biography, "Haizlip’s vision was for a program that would use the variety show format to display the breadth and variety of Black culture. The mission of “Soul!” would be not merely to entertain African American viewers, but to challenge them to ponder the possible meanings of Black culture and Black community at a time when African Americans were driving America's social transformation... Soul! was unapologetic about aiming its diverse and self-critical weekly affirmation of Black culture and politics to African American viewers, a group that had previously not had the pleasure of seeing itself widely, or truthfully, represented on television.."

Haizlip continued to actively promote African American culture through events such as the first Congressional Black Caucus Dinner in 1970; and "Soul at the Center", a 12-day festival of performing arts held at the Lincoln Center. After the television show ended in 1973, when funding was reduced, he remained active in the media. He also coordinated work at the Schomburg Center for Research in Black Culture.

He was diagnosed with lung cancer in the 1980s, and then with a brain tumor. He died in 1991, at George Washington University Medical Center, aged 61.

In 2018, a documentary film about Ellis Haizlip entitled Mr. Soul! was written, directed and produced by his niece, filmmaker Melissa Haizlip.
