= Melissa Haizlip =

American filmmaker

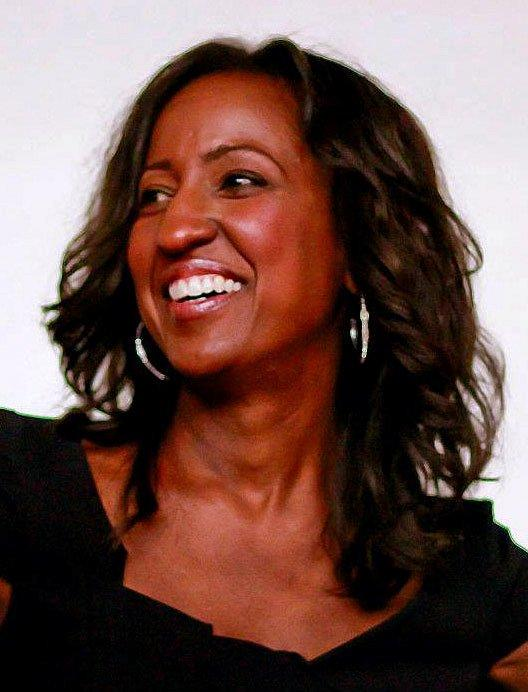
- Haizlip at Howard University, Washington, D.C.
- Born: April 30, 1965 (age 61); Boston, Massachusetts, U.S.
- Education: Yale University
- Occupations: Director; Producer; Writer
- Years active: 1986–present
- Spouse: Don Wildman
- Parent: Shirlee Taylor Haizlip
- Relatives: Ellis Haizlip (uncle)

Melissa Haizlip (born April 30, 1965) is an American film producer, director, and writer most notable for her 2018 film, Mr. SOUL!. Haizlip won an NAACP Image Award and a Peabody Award for Mr. SOUL!.

== Biography ==
Haizlip was born in Boston, Massachusetts to educator Harold C. Haizlip and author Shirlee Taylor Haizlip, while both were attending graduate school at Harvard. She grew up in New York, St. Thomas, US Virgin Islands, and Connecticut, where she later attended Yale University.

Haizlip started her career in musical theater, performing professionally on Broadway in New York City, and in film and television in Los Angeles, before moving into film production in 1999.

In 2009, Haizlip founded Shoes in the Bed Productions.

In 2013, she produced the award-winning short film entitled, "You're Dead To Me" directed by Wu Tsang, about a grieving Chicana mother coming to terms with the loss of her transgender child on Día de los Muertos. The film won Best Short at the 2014 Imagen Awards and was screened in over 50 film festivals winning many awards.

In 2019, Haizlip, produced and directed a short documentary entitled, "Contact High: A Visual History of Hip-Hop" for the Annenberg Space for Photography as an installation for an exhibit which was based on the 2018 photography book, created and written by Vikki Tobak, an ongoing exhibition series.

In the summer of 2019, Haizlip produced "Soul at the Center," an event honoring the 60th anniversary of Lincoln Center, kicking off their Out of Doors summer concert series in the Damrosch Park Bandshell. The opening night was dedicated to Ellis Haizlip paying homage to his 1972 – 1973 Black Arts festival, aptly named Soul at the Center. The celebration featured Grammy Award–winning vocalist Lalah Hathaway, who paid tribute to her father Donny Hathaway, who performed at the original 1972 event on the opening night concert.

Haizlip was one of the executive directors for the TV mini series entitled, "Black Pop: Celebrating The Power of Black Culture", which was released on June 18, 2023 on NBC.

== Mr. SOUL! ==
Haizlip wrote, produced and directed the award-winning film, Mr.SOUL! It made its debut at the Tribeca Film Festival in 2018. The film won the 2018 Best Music Documentary at the International Documentary Association Awards. The film was screened at over 50 film festivals from April 2018 through 2019 including BFI London, Hot Docs, Martha's Vineyard African American Film Festival, Woodstock Film Festival, True / False Film Festival, Urbanworld Film Festival, and Pan African Film Festival, among others.

On August 28, 2020, Haizlip's film was released in limited theaters and virtual cinemas. On November 16, 2020, Mr. SOUL! won Best First Documentary Feature at the Critics Choice Awards.

The film premiered on public television on Independent Lens during Black History Month on February 22, 2021. The end title song, "Show Me Your Soul" performed by Lalah Hathaway and Robert Glasper and written by Hathaway, Glasper, Muhammad Ayers and Haizlip was on the shortlist for the 93rd Academy Awards in the category of Music (Best Original Song).

On March 22, 2021, Haizlip won an NAACP Image Award for Outstanding Writing in a Documentary (Television or Motion Picture) for the film, Mr. SOUL!. On June 6, 2022, Morgan Freeman announced that Mr. SOUL! won the Peabody Award for Best Documentary.

== Personal ==
Haizlip's company Shoes in the Bed Productions LLC., is based in New York City. She resides in Croton-on-Hudson, New York, with her husband Don Wildman.
