= 2024 Seattle International Film Festival =

Edition of film festival

- Opening film: Thelma
- Closing film: Sing Sing
- Location: Seattle, Washington, US
- Founded: 1976
- Hosted by: Seattle International Film Festival (SIFF)
- Festival date: May 9–19 in person; May 20–27 streaming
- Language: English
- Website: Seattle International Film Festival 2024 (archive)
- 2025 Seattle International Film Festival 2023 Seattle International Film Festival

The 2024 Seattle International Film Festival (also referred to as SIFFty for this year) took place in theaters from May 9 to 19, 2024, and streaming May 20 to 27, 2024. SIFF announced an initial six films on March 14 and the full lineup on April 17, 2024. This year's festival had 261 films from 84 countries and regions. The selections included 92 new and five archival features, 47 documentaries, and 115 short films.

The festival took place at various locations, including the SIFF Cinema Uptown (3 screens), the SIFF Cinema Downtown, the SIFF Cinema Egyptian, the SIFF Film Center (a venue at Seattle Center), the AMC Theatres at Pacific Place, Majestic Bay Theatres, and Shoreline Community College Theater. The festival sold nearly 95,000 tickets, and SIFF venues sold 18,000 pounds (8,200 kg) of popcorn. Selected films from the festival were online from May 20–27, 2024. on the SIFF Channel.

The opening, Thelma, occurred at the Paramount Theatre. The closing was Sing Sing at the SIFF Cinema Downtown followed by a gala party at MOHAI.

== SIFFty name ==
Although the first festival was in 1976 and the occurrence in 2024 would seem to have indicated the 49th festival, in 1988 the festival organizers yielded to triskaidekaphobia, so that the "14th" festival occurred in its 13th year. SIFF chose the term SIFFty to mark the 50th edition of the film festival.

== Films ==
=== Narrative features ===
Individual feature film citations are at SIFF's Film Finder 2024.

Narrative feature films screened at SIFF 2024
| English title | Director(s) | Production country | Premiere | Comp. |
|---|---|---|---|---|
| A Journey in Spring | Wang Ping-Wen, Peng Tzu-Hui | Taiwan | | Dir. |
| After the Fire | Mehdi Fikri | France | U.S. | |
| Aggro Dr1ft | Harmony Korine | United States | | |
| Agra | Kanu Behl | India, France | | |
| All Shall Be Well | Ray Yeung | Hong Kong, China | North American | Off. |
| All Your Faces | Jeanne Herry | France | | |
| Àma Gloria | Marie Amachoukeli | France | | Dir. |
| Babes | Pamela Adlon | United States | | |
| Banel & Adama | Ramata-Toulaye Sy | Mali, Senegal, France | | |
| Before It Ends | Anders Walter | Denmark | | |
| Bob Trevino Likes It | Tracie Laymon | United States | | |
| Bonjour Switzerland | Peter Luisi | Switzerland, Italy | | |
| Chuck Chuck Baby | Janis Pugh | United Kingdom | | |
| City of Wind | Lkhagvadulam Purev-Ochir | Mongolia, France, Germany, Netherlands, Portugal, Qatar | | Dir. |
| Close Your Eyes | Víctor Erice | Spain, Argentina | | |
| Critical Zone | Ali Ahmadzadeh | Iran, Germany | | Off. |
| Dìdi | Sean Wang | United States | | Off. |
| Disco Afrika: A Malagasy Story | Luck Razanajaona | Madagascar, France, Madagascar, Germany, Mauritius, South Africa, Qatar | U.S. | |
| Empire Waist | Claire Ayoub | United States | | |
| Eternal | Ulaa Salim | Denmark, Iceland, Norway | North American | |
| Evil Does Not Exist | Ryûsuke Hamaguchi | Japan | | Off. |
| Excursion | Una Gunjak | Bosnia and Herzegovina, Croatia, Serbia, France, Norway, Qatar | | Dir. |
| Familiar | Călin Peter Netzer | Romania | North American | |
| Ghostlight | Kelly O'Sullivan, Alex Thompson | United States | | |
| Girls Will Be Girls | Shuchi Talati | India, France, United States, Norway | | |
| Gloria! | Margherita Vicario | Italy, Switzerland | North American | Off. |
| Good One | India Donaldson | United States | | |
| Green Border | Agnieszka Holland | Poland, United States, France, Czech Republic, Belgium, Germany, Turkey | | |
| Hajjan | Abu Bakr Shawky | Saudi Arabia, Egypt, Jordan | | |
| Hammarskjöld | Per Fly | Sweden, Norway, Denmark | North American | |
| Hesitation Wound | Selman Nacar | Turkey, France, Romania, Spain | | |
| Holy Mother | Antonio Chavarrías | Spain, Belgium | North American | IbA. |
| I Saw the TV Glow | Jane Schoenbrun | United States | | |
| I Told You So | Ginevra Elkann | Italy | | |
| In a Violent Nature | Chris Nash | Canada | | |
| In Flames | Zarrar Kahn | Pakistan, Canada | | |
| In Our Day | Hong Sang-soo | South Korea | | |
| Iron Mask | Kim Sung Hwan | South Korea | North American | |
| Janet Planet | Annie Baker | United States, United Kingdom | | |
| Killing Romance | Lee Won-suk | South Korea | | |
| Lies We Tell | Lisa Mulcahy | Ireland | | |
| Making Of | Cédric Kahn | France | U.S. | |
| Memories of a Burning Body | Antonella Sudasassi Furniss | Costa Rica, Spain | North American | IbA. |
| Molokaʻi Bound | Alika Tengan | United States | World | Amer. |
| Mountains | Monica Sorelle | United States | | Amer. |
| Oddity | Damian McCarthy | Ireland | | |
| Pigsy | Li Wei Chiu | Taiwan, Netherlands | | |
| Rats! | Maxwell Nalevansky, Carl Fry | United States | | |
| Red Rooms | Pascal Plante | Canada (Québec) | | |
| Red, White & Brass | Damon Fepulea’i | New Zealand | | |
| Saturn Return | Isaki Lacuesta, Pol Rodríguez | Spain, France | North American | IbA. |
| Scorched Earth | Thomas Arslan | Germany | North American | |
| Seagrass | Meredith Hama-Brown | Canada | | |
| Sebastian | Mikko Mäkelä | United Kingdom, Finland, Belgium | | |
| Sing Sing | Greg Kwedar | United States | | |
| Sirocco and the Kingdom of the Winds | Benoît Chieux | Belgium, France | | |
| Slow | Marija Kavtaradze | Lithuania, Spain, Sweden | | |
| Solitude | Ninna Pálmadóttir | Iceland, Slovakia, France | | Dir. |
| Solo | Sophie Dupuis | Canada (Québec) | | |
| Stress Positions | Theda Hammel | United States | | |
| Sujo | Astrid Rondero, Fernanda Valadez | Mexico, France, United States | | IbA. |
| Tenement | Sokyou Chea, Inrasothythep Neth | Cambodia | North American | |
| Terrestrial Verses | Ali Asgari, Alireza Khatami | Iran, United States | | |
| The Black Sea | Crystal Moselle, Derrick B. Harden | Bulgaria, United States | | Amer. |
| The Box Man | Gakuryû Ishii | Japan | North American | |
| The Burdened | Amr Gamal | Yemen, Sudan, Saudi Arabia | | Dir. |
| The Extortion | Martino Zaidelis | Argentina, United States | | |
| The Major Tones | Ingrid Pokropek | Argentina, Spain | | IbA. |
| The Missile | Miia Tervo | Finland, Estonia | North American | |
| The Missing | Carl Joseph Papa | Philippines | | |
| The New Boy | Warwick Thornton | Australia | | |
| The Primevals | David W. Allen | United States | | |
| The Queen of My Dreams | Fawzia Mirza | Canada | | |
| The Quiet Maid | Miguel Faus | Spain | North American | IbA. |
| The Summer with Carmen | Zacharias Mavroeidis | Greece | | |
| The Tundra within Me | Sara Margrethe Oskal | Norway | | |
| The Uncertain Detective | Gregg Lachow | United States | World | |
| The Vanishing Soldier | Dani Rosenberg | Israel, Italy | | |
| Thelma | Josh Margolin | United States | | |
| Through Rocks and Clouds | Franco Garcia Becerra | Peru, Chile | U.S. | IbA. |
| Tiger Stripes | Amanda Nell Eu | Malaysia, Taiwan, France, Germany, Netherlands, Singapore, Qatar, Indonesia | | |
| Tim Travers and the Time Traveler’s Paradox | Stimson Snead | United States | | |
| Tony, Shelly and the Magic Light | Filip Pošivač | Czech Republic, Hungary, Slovakia | | |
| Un amor | Isabel Coixet | Spain | U.S. | |
| Valentina or the Serenity | Ángeles Cruz | Mexico | | IbA. |
| Voy! Voy! Voy! | Omar Hilal | Egypt, United Arab Emirates | | |
| We Have Never Been Modern | Matěj Chlupáček | Czech Republic, Slovakia | | |
| We Strangers | Anu Valia | United States | | Amer. |
| Where Is Anne Frank | Ari Folman | Israel, Switzerland, Belgium, Germany, the Netherlands | | |
| Woman Of... | Małgorzata Szumowska, Michał Englert | Poland, Sweden | | |
| Woodland | Elisabeth Scharang | Austria | | |
| Young Hearts | Anthony Schatteman | Belgium, Netherlands | North American | |

=== Documentary features ===
Individual feature film citations are at SIFF's Film Finder 2024.

Documentary feature films screened at SIFF 2024
| English title | Director(s) | Production country | Premiere | Comp. |
|---|---|---|---|---|
| 399: Queen of the Tetons | Elizabeth Leiter | United States | | |
| A New Kind of Wilderness | Silje Evensmo Jacobsen | Norway | | Doc. |
| Admissions Granted | Hao Wu, Miao Wang | United States | | |
| Agent of Happiness | Arun Bhattarai, Dorottya Zurbó | Bhutan, Hungary | | |
| All We Carry | Cady Voge | United States, Mexico | | |
| Black Box Diaries | Shiori Ito | Japan, United States, United Kingdom | | |
| Bring Them Home | Ivan MacDonald, Ivy MacDonald, Daniel Glick | United States, Canada | | |
| Chasing Ice | Jeff Orlowski | United States | | |
| Dancing on the Edge of a Volcano | Cyril Aris | Lebanon, Germany | | |
| Fish War | Jeff Ostenson, Charles Atkinson, Skylar Wagner | United States | World | |
| Food Roots | Michele Josue | United States, Philippines | | |
| Fragments of a Life Loved | Chloé Barreau | Italy | U.S. | Doc. |
| Grandpa Guru | Silvio Mirošničenko | Croatia, Bosnia and Herzegovina | U.S. | |
| Grasshopper Republic | Daniel McCabe | United States | | Doc. |
| High & Low - John Galliano | Kevin Macdonald | France, United States, United Kingdom | | |
| Hitchcock’s Pro-Nazi Film | Daphné Baiwir | France | North American | |
| Hollywoodgate | Ibrahim Nash’at | Germany, United States | | Doc. |
| I'm Just Here for the Riot | Kathleen Jayme, Asia Youngman | Canada | | |
| Igualada | Juan Mejía Botero | Colombia, United States, Mexico | | IbA. |
| Love Machina | Peter Sillen | United States | | Off. |
| Luther: Never Too Much | Dawn Porter | United States | | |
| Merchant Ivory | Stephen Soucy | United States | | |
| Música! | Rob Epstein, Jeffrey Friedman | United States | | |
| My Sextortion Diary | Patricia Franquesa | Spain | | |
| Porcelain War | Brendan Bellomo, Slava Leontyev | Ukraine, United States, Australia | | |
| Rainier: A Beer Odyssey | Isaac Olsen | United States | World | |
| Resynator | Alison Tavel | United States | | |
| Rioja: The Land of a ThoUnited Statesnd Wines | José Luis Lopez-Linares | Spain | U.S. | |
| Rising Up at Night | Nelson Makengo | Belgium, Democratic Republic of the Congo, Germany, Burkina Faso, Qatar | | |
| Scala!!! | Jane Giles, Ali Catterall | United Kingdom | | |
| So This Is Christmas | Ken Wardrop | Ireland | U.S. | Doc. |
| So Unreal | Amanda Kramer | United States | | Doc. |
| Songs of Earth | Margreth Olin | Norway | | |
| Sono Lino | Jacob Patrick | United States, Italy, France | | |
| Soundtrack to a Coup d'Etat | Johan Grimonprez | Belgium, France, Netherlands | | |
| Standing Above the Clouds | Jalena Keane-Lee | Hawaiian Kingdom, United States | U.S. | |
| Subterranean | François-Xavier De Ruydts | Canada (Québec) | | |
| Sugarcane | Julian Brave NoiseCat, Emily Kassie | United States, Canada | | Off. |
| SUnited Statesn Feniger. Forked | Liz Lachman | United States, China, Vietnam | | |
| The Battle for Laikipia | Daphne Matziaraki, Peter Murimi | Kenya, United States, Greece | | |
| The Etilaat Roz | Abbas Rezaie | Afghanistan | | |
| The Mother of All Lies | Asmae El Moudir | Morocco, Egypt, Saudi Arabia, Qatar | | |
| The Ride Ahead | Dan Habib, Samuel Habib | United States | | Doc. |
| Three Promises | Yusef Srouji | Palestine, United States, Lebanon | | |
| Ultimate Citizens | Francine Strickwerda | United States | | |
| We Can Be Heroes | Carina Mia Wong, Alex Simmons | United States | | |
| WHY DINOSAURS? | James Pinto, Tony Pinto | United States, Canada, United Kingdom, Morocco, China | World | |

=== Shorts ===
Individual short film citations are at SIFF's Short Film Finder 2024.

Short films screened at SIFF 2024
| English title | Director(s) | Production country | Premiere |
|---|---|---|---|
| 27 | Flóra Anna Buda | France, Hungary | |
| A.A. | Auden Bui | United States | World |
| Áhkuin | Radio-Jus Sunná / Sunná Nousuniemiámi, Guhtur Niillas Rita Duomis / Tuomas Kumpulainen | Finland | North American |
| Ashes of Roses | Sasha Waters Freyer | United States | |
| Baggage | Tim Hendrix | United States | |
| Baigal Nuur - Lake Baikal | Alisi Telengut | Canada, Germany | |
| Basri & Salma in a Never-Ending Comedy | Khozy Rizal | Indonesia | |
| Black Silk | Patrick Michael | United States | |
| Blow! | Neus Ballús | Spain | North American |
| Bold Eagle | Whammy Alcazaren | Philippines | |
| Broken Art | Ryan Powers | United States | |
| Buffer Zone | Savvas Stavrou | Cyprus, Greece | |
| Bug Diner | Phoebe Jane Hart | United States | |
| Callus | Ciarán Hickey | Ireland | |
| Camille | Denise Roldán | Mexico | |
| Can | Kailee McGee | United States | |
| Canard | Elie Chapuis | Switzerland, Belgium | |
| Cantata | Dave Fox | Ireland | |
| Carnívora | Felipe Vargas | United States | |
| Cetology | Catherine Bisley | New Zealand, St. Kitts | North American |
| Chasing Time | Jeff Orlowski-Yang, Sarah Keo | United States, Iceland | |
| CHOMP | Cricket Arrison, Suki-Rose Otter | United States | |
| Corpus and the Wandering | Jo Roy | Canada | U.S. |
| Cycles | Pisie Hochheim, Tony Oswald | United States | |
| Dark Mommy | Courtney Eck | United States | |
| Demi-Goddesses | Marin Gerigk | Germany | |
| Detox | Alex Hanno | United States | |
| Donut Boy | Bunthoeun Real | United States | |
| Dream Creep | Carlos A.F. Lopez | United States | |
| Eileithyia | Dan Fromhart | United States | World |
| Electra | Daria Kashcheeva | Czech Republic | |
| Embers of Retribution | Sienna Stiefel | United States | |
| Enchukunoto (The Return) | Laissa Malih | Kenya | North American |
| Essex Girls | Yero Timi-Biu | United Kingdom | |
| Female Captive | Brit Crawshaw, Josh Hayward | United States | World |
| Gath & K'iyh: Listen to Heal | Princess Daazhraii Johnson | United States | |
| Golden Child | Hannah Levin | United States | |
| Grandmamauntsistercat | Zuza Banasińska | Netherlands, Poland | |
| Hair Universe | Jinuk Choi | South Korea | |
| Happiness in the Palm of Her Hand | Ella Janes | United States | |
| Her First Time | Mikaela Isabel Brown-Cestero, Malia Aniston | United States | World |
| I am the nature | Taliesin Black-Brown | Ecuador, Brazil | |
| I Think I'd Like to Stay | Brianna B Murphy | United States | World |
| I’ll Take Porn for $200 | Mischa Jakupcak | United States | World |
| I'm Thinking About Becoming a Plant. | Orson Ford | United States | |
| Imogene | Katie Blair | United States | |
| In the Garden of Tulips | Julia Elihu | United States | |
| Is This Now the Time I Should Let You Go? | Yi-Chin Tsai | Taiwan, Finland, Belgium, Portugal | North American |
| Janelle Niles: Inconvenient | Cass Gardiner, Kelly Aija Zemnickis | Canada | |
| Jellyfish and Lobster | Yasmin Afifi | United Kingdom | |
| Lady Parts | Ariel McCleese | United States | |
| Last Dawn of the 6th | Stephan Gray | United States | World |
| Let | Alyssa Loh | United States | |
| Llamas at the Laundromat | Martha Grant | Canada, United States | |
| Loop me in | Bernd Oppl | Austria | North American |
| Loving in Between | Jyoti Mistry | Austria, South Africa | |
| Madeleine | Raquel Sancinetti | Canada (Québec) | |
| Magic Candies | Daisuke Nishio | Japan | |
| Make Me a Pizza | Talia Shea Levin | United States | |
| Meet Me at the Creek | Loren Waters | United States | |
| Might Not Wanna Wake Up | Lxandra | Finland | North American |
| Mog's Christmas | Robin Shaw | United Kingdom | |
| My Dark Angels | Azza Brummer | United States | |
| My Heart and Other Black Holes | Samiksha Thakur | United States | World |
| Newman's Block | Hudson Hillin | United States | |
| No Silence | Gina Crow | United Kingdom, United States | World |
| NYC RGB | Viktoria Schmid | Austria, United States | |
| Of Silence and Song | Leyi Dai | United States | |
| One Date | Andrew 'King Bach' Bachelor | United States | |
| Peeping Mom | Francis Canitrot | France | |
| Pickles by Elenore | Priya Aracely | United States | |
| Pipe Dreams | Christina Woo | United States | |
| Pisko the Crab Child is in Love | Makoto Nagahisa | Japan | |
| Play Again | Zen Pace | United States, Brazil | World |
| Primetime Mother | Sonny Calvento | Philippines, Singapore | |
| Pure Evil | Edward Brown | United States | |
| Quasi Perfetto | Federico Frefel | Italy, Switzerland | North American |
| Qulleq | Aka Hansen | Greenland | North American |
| Rabid Love | Noah Lazar Abraham | United States | |
| Recollect | Eli Williams | United States | |
| Relationship to Patient | Caroline Creaghead | United States | |
| Room Tone | Michael Gabriele | United States | |
| Somni | Sonja Rohleder | Germany | |
| Sweet Juices | Sejon Im, Will Suen | Australia | |
| Tahnaanooku’ | Justin Deegan | United States | U.S. |
| Tango for the End | Lazar Jovanović | Serbia | |
| Technical Support | Kris Lefcoe | United States | |
| Tennis, Oranges | Sean Pecknold | United States | |
| The Day the Sky Darkened | Barış Kuzey Yılmaz | Turkey | World |
| The Guardian Lion and Budaixi | Hsieh-Cheng Tsai, You-Cheng Lai, Shih-Peng Chang, Shao-Xuan Weng, Min-Xiang Zhang, You-Xun Lai | Taiwan | |
| The Influencer | Lael Rogers | United States | |
| The Key | Rakan Mayasi | Belgium, Palestine, Qatar, France | |
| The Key Within | Henry Kaufman | United States | U.S. |
| The Lost Season | Kelly Sears | United States | |
| The Lovers | Carolina Sandvik | Sweden | |
| The Queen Vs. Texas | Emil Lozada, Raemonn James | United States | |
| The Queen’s Flowers | Ciara Leinaala Lacy | United States | |
| The Rainbow Bridge | Dimitri Simakis | United States | |
| The Rising of the Sap | Susie Jones | United Kingdom | World |
| The School of Canine Massage | Emma D. Miller | United States | |
| The Shell Covered Ox | Daniel Barosa | Brazil, United States | |
| The Snip | Ben S. Hyland | United Kingdom | |
| The Ugandan Quidditch Movement | Ben Garfield | United States | |
| The Waiting | Voker Schlecht | Germany | |
| The Waves Call You | Ana Verde | Puerto Rico | World |
| Torrent | Aidan Kiyashka | United States | |
| Trial | Tommy Heffernan | United States | World |
| Unpaused | Yiheng Yao | China | |
| Untitled, Jackson Heights | Armon Mahdavi | United States | |
| Vakaraitaka | Fenton Lutunatabua | Fiji | North American |
| When We Sleep | Alanna Johnson | United States | |
| Who's There? | Ryan Doris | United States | |
| Winding Path | Alexandra Lazarowich, Ross Kauffman | United States | |
| You Can't Get What You Want But You Can Get Me | Samira Elagoz, Z Walsh | Netherlands, Finland | U.S. |

== Film competitions and programs ==
SIFF organized the films into the following programs: African Picture, Alternative Cinema, Archival Films, Asian Crossroad, cINeDIGENOUS, Culinary Cinema, Face the Music, Films4Families, FutureWave, Ibero-American Cinema, New American Cinema, Northwest Connections, Short Film Packages, and WTF. A film could appear in more than one program.

SIFF in 2024 listed five feature competitions:

- Official Competition
- Documentary Competition
- Ibero-American Competition
- New American Cinema Competition
- New Directors Competition

There was also a competition for short films that had three categories, Live Action, Animation, and Documentary. All three categories of short films also served as qualifiers for the corresponding categories for the Academy Awards.

The 2024 Seattle International Festival had jury and audience awards. There were also festival awards from other organizations.

=== Juried Competition Awards ===
Jurors served several different juries. For feature films, there were juries for the official competition, new directors, new American cinema, Ibero-American, and documentaries. There were two short film juries, one for narrative films and another for documentary and animated films.

Juried Competition Award winners
| Award | Film title | Director(s) | Country |
|---|---|---|---|
| Official Competition Grand Jury Prize | Gloria! | Margherita Vicario | Italy |
| Official Competition Special Jury Prize | Sugarcane | Julian Brave NoiseCat and Emily Kassie | United States |
| New Directors Competition Grand Jury Prize | City of Wind | Lkhagvadulam Purev-Ochir | Mongolia |
| New Directors Competition Special Jury Prize | Young Hearts | Anthony Schatteman | Belgium |
| New American Cinema Competition Grand Jury Prize | We Strangers | Anu Valia | United States |
| Documentary Competition Grand Jury Prize | A New Kind of Wilderness | Silje Evensmo Jacobsen | Norway |
| Documentary Competition Special Jury Prize | The Ride Ahead | Dan Habib and Samuel Habib | United States |
| Ibero-American Competition Grand Jury Prize | Through Rocks and Clouds | Franco Garcia Becerra | Peru |
| Ibero-American Special Jury Prize | The Major Tones | Ingrid Pokropek | Argentina |
| Wavemaker Award: Best Futurewave Feature | Empire Waist | Claire Ayoub | United States |
| Prodigy Camp Scholarship Prize | Newman's Block | Hudson Hillin | United States |
| Narrative Short Grand Jury Prize | The Shell Covered Ox | Daniel Barosa | Brazil |
| Narrative Short Special Jury Prize | Essex Girls | Yero Timi-Biu | United Kingdom |
| Documentary Short Grand Jury Prize | The Waiting | Volker Schlecht | Germany |
| Animated Short Grand Jury Prize | Madeleine | Raquel Sancinetti | Canada |

=== Golden Space Needle Awards ===
The Golden Space Needle Awards are voted by the audience.

Golden Space Needle Awards winners
| Award | Film title | Director(s) | Country |
|---|---|---|---|
| Best Film | Sing Sing | Greg Kwedar | United States |
| Best Director | Ghostlight | Kelly O'Sullivan, Alex Thompson | United States |
| Best Performance | Ghostlight | Keith Kupferer | United States |
| Best Short | Jellyfish and Lobster | Yasmin Afifi | United Kingdom |
| Best Documentary | Porcelain War | Brendan Bellomo and Slava Leontyev | Ukraine/United States/Australia |

=== Additional awards ===
Additional award winners
| Award | Film title | Director(s) | Country |
|---|---|---|---|
| 2024 Seattle Film Critics Society Feature Film Award | I Saw The TV Glow | Jane Schoenbrun | United States |
| Lena Sharpe Award for Persistence of Vision | Black Box Diaries | Shiori Ito | Japan/United States/United Kingdom |
| Award | Recipient | | |
| Golden Space Needle Award for Outstanding Contribution to Cinema | June Squibb | | |

FOOL Serious, an "officially unofficial un-organization of the Seattle International Film Festival‘s passholders" also had their own awards for the 2024 festival.
