= Minneapolis–Saint Paul International Film Festival =

Film festival

Coordinates: 44°59′5.3″N 93°15′17″W

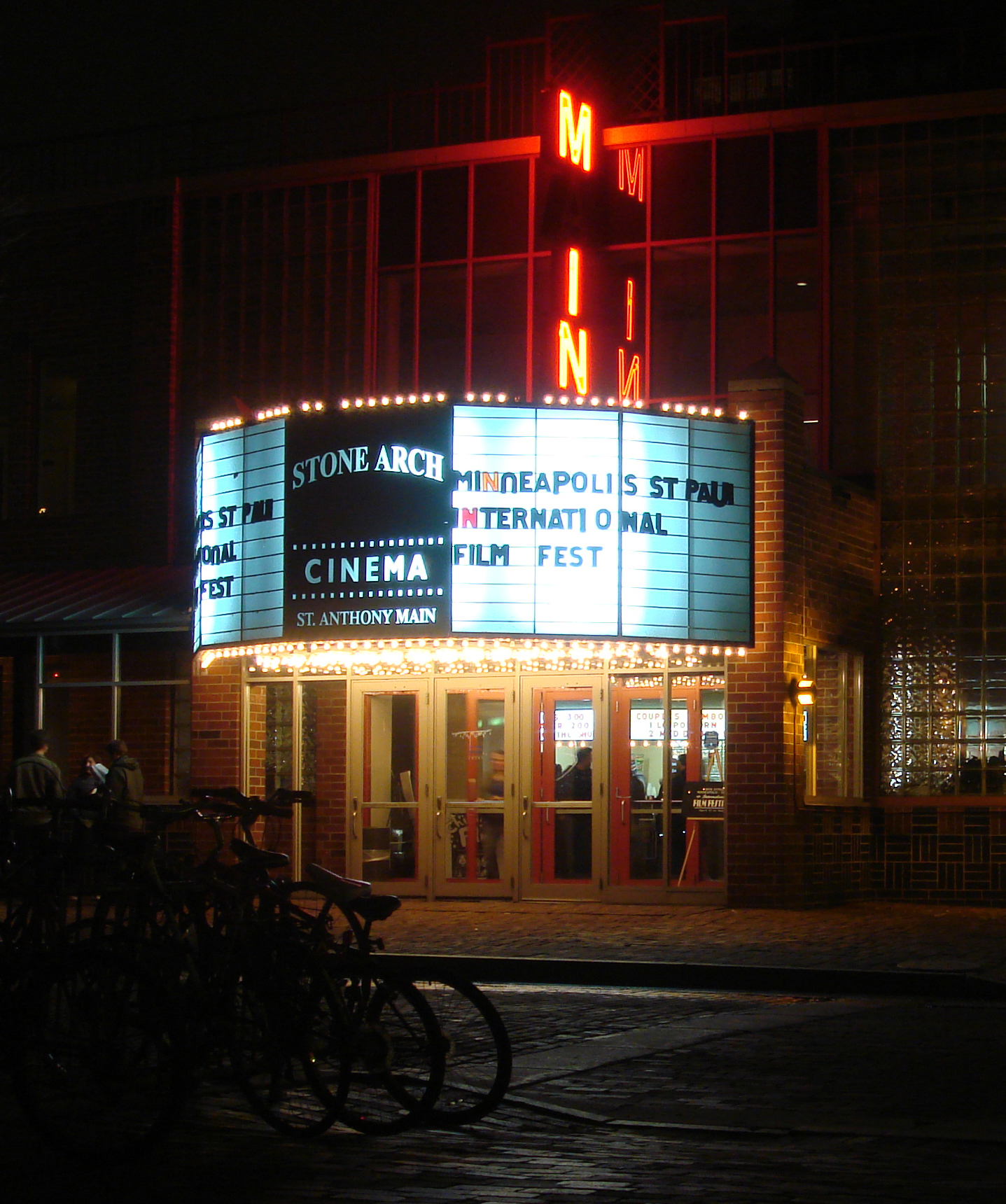
The Main Cinema, where most of over 200 films in the MSPIFF are shown.

The Minneapolis St. Paul International Film Festival (MSPIFF) is an annual springtime film festival in the U.S. state of Minnesota that has been held since 1981. It began as the Rivertown Film Festival of Pine City and eventually grew to become the largest film event in the Upper Midwest, with an annual attendance that exceeds 40,000.

Historically lauded for being one of the world's finest showcases of Scandinavian films, the festival features an eclectic lineup of films from more than 70 countries and cultures around the world. Locally produced material is also highlighted through a series called Minnesota Made, or MN Made.

== Organization ==
The Festival is organized by the MSP Film Society, a 501(c)(3) non-profit film exhibition organization that also operates The Main Cinema along the Mississippi River on historic Main Street across from downtown Minneapolis. Several other venues around the Twin Cities also participate in the film festival.

In addition to film screenings, the festival also hosts a number of panels and discussions. Some of these panels relate to a specific film included within the festival lineup, with others pertaining to general industry topics.

== History ==
In 2023, MSPIFF screened Cue the Strings: a Film about Low, a documentary about the Minnesota band Low directed by Twin Cities filmmaker Philip Harder.

In 2024, two-time Academy Award winning cinematographer Roger Deakins, a frequent collaborator of Minnesota filmmakers Joel and Ethan Coen, attended MSPIFF and took part in an industry night event, book signing, and screening of Fargo followed by a Q&A.

== Reception ==
In December 2014, the Film Society attracted national attention when it became one of the few distributors in the country to exhibit the controversial film The Interview after Sony Pictures reinstated the film's theatrical release after scrapping it amidst threats from hackers purportedly associated with the North Korean government.

== Awards ==
Year	Emerging Filmmaker	Documentary	Animated Shorts	Documentary shorts	Fiction shorts	Audience Choice Awards
2024	Winner: Girls Will Be Girls, dir. Shuchi Talati, India/France/USA/Norway, 2024 Special Jury Award: Foremost by Night, dir. Victor Iriarte, Spain/Portugal/France, 2023	Winner: Sugarcane, dir. Julian Brave NoiseCat & Emily Kassie, Canada/USA, 2024 Special Jury Award for Innovation: Swamp Dogg Gets His Pool Painted, dir. Isaac Gale & Ryan Olson, USA, 2024 Special Jury Award for Directing: Porcelain War, dir. Brendan Bellomo & Slava Leontyev, Ukraine/USA/Australia, 2024	Winner: Tennis, Oranges, dir. Sean Pecknold, USA, 2024Honorable Mention: Bluebird in the Wind, dir. Ellis Kayin Chan, Hong Kong, 2023	Winner: The Only Girl in the Orchestra, dir. Molly O'Brien, USA, 2023 Special Jury Award: Through the Storm, dir. Fritz Bitsole & Charles Frank, USA, 2023 Artistic Merit Award: Salone Love, dir. Tajana B Williams, USA/Sierra Leone, 2023	Winner: Muna, dir. Warda Mohamed, UK, 2023 Honorable Mention: Layaway, dir. Kaitlyn T. Busbee, USA, 2023	Fiction Feature: Bonjour Switzerland, dir. Peter Luisi, Switzerland, 2023 Documentary Feature: Swamp Dogg Gets His Pool Painted, dir. Isaac Gale & Ryan Olson, USA, 2024 Fiction Short: Mis-Alignment, dir. Pablo Riesgo Almonacid, USA, 2023 Documentary Short: Uncle Bully's Surf Skool, dir. Leah Warshowski, USA, 2023 Animated Short: Luki and the Lights, dir. Toni Cochran, Netherlands, 2023
2026	Winner: Cotton Queen, directed by Suzannah Mirghani	Winner: To Hold a Mountain, directed by Biljana Tutorov and Petar Glomazic	Winner: 113 Words for You Today, directed by Bo Qing Tang and Xiao Lan Zeng	Winner: Correct Me If I'm Wrong, directed by Hao Zhou	Winner: Nervous Energy, directed by Eve Liu	Winners: Uncle Roy, directed by Keri Pickett (Documentary feature) Colors of Time, directed by Cédric Klapisch (Fiction feature)
