= 77th Directors Guild of America Awards =

- Date: February 8, 2025
- Location: The Beverly Hilton, Beverly Hills, California
- Country: United States
- Presented by: Directors Guild of America
- Hosted by: Judd Apatow

Highlights
- Best Director Feature Film: Anora – Sean Baker
- Best Director Documentary: Porcelain War – Brendan Bellomo and Slava Leontyev
- Best Director First-Time Feature Film: Nickel Boys – RaMell Ross

The 77th Directors Guild of America Awards, honoring the outstanding directorial achievement in feature films, documentary, television and commercials of 2024, were presented on February 8, 2025, at the Beverly Hilton in Beverly Hills, California. The ceremony was hosted by Judd Apatow, who previously hosted the ceremonies in 2018, 2020, 2022, 2023 and 2024. The nominations for the television and documentary categories were announced on January 7, 2025, while the nominations for the feature film categories were announced on January 8, 2025.

== Winners and nominees ==
=== Film ===
Feature Film

Sean Baker – Anora

- Jacques Audiard – Emilia Pérez
- Edward Berger – Conclave
- Brady Corbet – The Brutalist
- James Mangold – A Complete Unknown
Documentaries

Brendan Bellomo and Slava Leontyev – Porcelain War

- Julian Brave NoiseCat and Emily Kassie – Sugarcane
- Johan Grimonprez – Soundtrack to a Coup d'Etat
- Ibrahim Nash'at – Hollywoodgate
- Natalie Rae and Angela Patton – Daughters
Michael Apted First-Time Feature Film

RaMell Ross – Nickel Boys

- Payal Kapadia – All We Imagine as Light
- Megan Park – My Old Ass
- Halfdan Ullmann Tøndel – Armand
- Sean Wang – Dìdi

=== Television ===
Drama Series

Frederick E. O. Toye – Shōgun for "Crimson Sky" (FX)

- Alex Graves – The Diplomat for "Dreadnought" (Netflix)
- Hiromi Kamata – Shōgun for "Ladies of the Willow World" (FX)
- Issa López – True Detective for "Part 6" (HBO)
- Jonathan Van Tulleken – Shōgun for "Anjin" (FX)
Comedy Series

Lucia Aniello – Hacks for "Bulletproof" (Max)

- Ayo Edebiri – The Bear for "Napkins" (FX)
- Duccio Fabbri – The Bear for "Doors" (FX)
- Jeff Schaffer – Curb Your Enthusiasm for "No Lessons Learned" (HBO)
- Christopher Storer – The Bear for "Tomorrow" (FX)
Movies for Television and Limited Series

Steven Zaillian – Ripley (Netflix)

- Kevin Bray – The Penguin for "Top Hat" (HBO)
- Alfonso Cuarón – Disclaimer (Apple TV+)
- Jennifer Getzinger – The Penguin for "A Great or Little Thing" (HBO)
- Helen Shaver – The Penguin for "Cent'Anni" (HBO)
Variety/Talk/News/Sports – Regularly Scheduled Programming

Liz Patrick – Saturday Night Live for "John Mulaney / Chappell Roan" (NBC)

- Paul G. Casey – Real Time with Bill Maher for "Jiminy Glick, Andrew Cuomo, Adam Kinzinger" (HBO)
- Jim Hoskinson – The Late Show with Stephen Colbert for "Rep. Alexandria Ocasio‑Cortez & Mavis Staples w/ Jeff Tweedy" (CBS)
- David Paul Meyer – The Daily Show for "Indecision 2024: The Democratic National Convention – Plot Twist!" (Comedy Central)
- Paul Pennolino – Last Week Tonight with John Oliver for "India Elections" (HBO)
Variety/Talk/News/Sports – Specials

Beth McCarthy-Miller – The Roast of Tom Brady (Netflix)

- Hamish Hamilton – The 96th Annual Academy Awards (ABC)
- David Paul Meyer – The Daily Show Presents A Live Election Night Special With Jon Stewart: Indecision 2024: Nothing We Can Do About It Now (Comedy Central)
- Glenn Weiss – The 77th Annual Tony Awards (CBS)
- Ali Wong – Ali Wong: Single Lady (Netflix)
Reality Programs

Neil DeGroot – Gordon Ramsay: Uncharted for "The Cliffs of Ireland" (National Geographic)

- Joseph Guidry – Deal or No Deal Island for "Are You Decisive?" (NBC)
- Ari Katcher – Jerrod Carmichael Reality Show for "Road Trip" (HBO)
- Patrick McManus – American Ninja Warrior for "Las Vegas Finals 4" (NBC)
- Mike Sweeney – Conan O'Brien Must Go for "Ireland" (Max)
Children's Programs

Amber Sealey – Out of My Mind (Disney+)

- Kat Coiro – The Spiderwick Chronicles for "Welcome to Spiderwick" (The Roku Channel)
- Michael Goi – Avatar: The Last Airbender for "Aang" (Netflix)
- Jim Mickle – Sweet Tooth for "This Is a Story" (Netflix)
- Jennifer Phang – Descendants: The Rise of Red (Disney+)

=== Commercials ===
Commercials

Andreas Nilsson – Hennessy's "Board Game", Andrex' "First Office Poo", Apple's "One More, Apple", and Virgin Media's "Whizzer"

- Lance Acord – Volkswagen's "An American Love Story"
- Kim Gehrig – SiriusXM's "A Life in Sound", Nike's "Am I A Bad Person", and Apple's "Find Your Friends"
- Tim Heidecker and Eric Wareheim – CeraVe's "Michael CeraVe"
- Ivan Zachariáš – Apple's "Flock"

=== Lifetime Achievement in Feature Film ===
- Ang Lee

=== Frank Capra Achievement Award ===
- Thomas J. Whelan

=== Robert B. Aldrich Award ===
- Mary Rae Thewlis
