= Maya Daisy Hawke =

New Zealand-born film editor and experimental filmmaker

- Occupations: Film editor Experimental filmmaker
- Known for: Navalny (2022); Sugarcane (2024); Cave of Forgotten Dreams (2010)
- Spouse: Joe Bini

Maya Daisy Hawke is a film editor and experimental filmmaker. She is best known for her work on documentaries, including the award-winning features Navalny (2022) and Sugarcane (2024), and has been a long-term collaborator with director Werner Herzog, working as an assistant editor on multiple Herzog films and as a co-editor on Cave of Forgotten Dreams (2010).

== Career ==
Hawke has edited feature-length documentaries, documentary series, and commercials, including for Apple, and has edited documentary series for the BBC.

She was co-editor on the documentary Navalny, with director Daniel Roher crediting her and Langdon Page with shaping a complex story into a digestible film. Navalny went on to win the Academy Award for Best Documentary Feature.

In 2024 she edited Sugarcane, which won the U.S. Documentary Directing Award at the 2024 Sundance Film Festival.

== Collaboration with Werner Herzog ==
Hawke has collaborated with Werner Herzog across multiple projects. She was an assistant editor on eight films with Herzog, including Grizzly Man, and co-edited Cave of Forgotten Dreams (2010). Her works on Herzog films are also collaborations with her husband Joe Bini.

The editing process takes place in Bini and Hawke's home, recording Herzog narrating the images at their editing desk, with Hawke describing Herzog and Bini's editorial process as "more of a language process".

== Experimental and live work ==
Hawke's experimental films have been exhibited and performed at venues and festivals including the Museum of the Moving Image (New York), the Sundance Film Festival, ICA Frames of Representation (London), LACMA, Camden International Film Festival, and IDFA.

With Bini, Hawke co-directed Little Ethiopia, an experimental documentary described as "art-house vaudeville" which was edited and narrated live.

== Teaching and advising ==
Hawke has served as an advisor at multiple Sundance labs since 2017 and was a fellow in the 2018 Sundance Nonfiction Directors Residency and a Sundance Interdisciplinary Fellow in 2020.

== Personal life ==
Hawke is from Christchurch, New Zealand. She attended Island School in Hong Kong, and lived in London, England as of 2026. She is married to fellow film editor Joe Bini.

== Selected filmography ==
=== Editor ===
- Cave of Forgotten Dreams (2010) – co-editor
- Janis: Little Girl Blue (2015) – editor
- Freedom Fields (2018) – editor
- Moon Landing Live (2019) – editor
- Navalny (2022) – editor
- Sugarcane (2024) – editor

=== Supervising / consulting editor ===
- After a Revolution (2022) – supervising editor
- Joonam (2023) – supervising editor
- Black Box Diaries (2024) – supervising / consulting editor
- A Photographic Memory (2024) – supervising editor

== Memberships ==
Hawke is a member of the Academy of Motion Picture Arts and Sciences.
