= Mona Lisa and the Blood Moon =

2021 film by Ana Lily Amirpour

- Theatrical release poster
- Directed by: Ana Lily Amirpour
- Written by: Ana Lily Amirpour
- Produced by: John Lesher; Dylan Weathered; Adam Mirels; Robbie Mirels
- Starring: Kate Hudson; Jun Jong-seo; Ed Skrein; Evan Whitten; Craig Robinson
- Cinematography: Pawel Pogorzelski
- Edited by: Taylor Levy
- Music by: Daniele Luppi
- Production companies: Rocket Science; Le Grisbi Productions; 141 Entertainment; Black Bicycle Entertainment; Wiip
- Distributed by: Saban Films
- Release dates: September 5, 2021 (Venice); September 30, 2022 (United States)
- Running time: 106 minutes
- Country: United States
- Language: English

Mona Lisa and the Blood Moon is a 2021 American fantasy thriller film written and directed by Ana Lily Amirpour. It stars Kate Hudson, Jun Jong-seo, Ed Skrein, Evan Whitten, and Craig Robinson.

The film had its world premiere at the 78th Venice International Film Festival on September 5, 2021. It was released by Saban Films in the United States on September 30, 2022.

== Plot ==
Mona Lisa Lee is a patient in a mental institution near New Orleans. After silently enduring abusive treatment, she uses a telepathic power to escape, injuring several workers who stand in her way. Wandering the streets aimlessly at night, she encounters various strangers, some of them hostile or menacing. Her strange behavior brings her to the attention of a policeman, Officer Harold, who tries to arrest her. She uses her power to cause him to shoot himself in the knee.

Next, she saves a woman named Bonnie Belle who is losing a fistfight in the parking lot of a fast food restaurant. Bonnie Belle, a stripper who is a single mother, befriends Mona Lisa and takes her home. Mona bonds with Bonnie's young son, Charlie.

Bonnie exploits Mona Lisa's power to rob people at ATMs, and to extort unintended tips from a group of disrespectful patrons of the strip club where she dances. Mona Lisa's actions bring her to the attention of Officer Harold, as he continues to investigate. When he confronts the two women, Bonnie's actions cause Mona Lisa to see through her and she ends the friendship. Alone, Bonnie is attacked and badly beaten by the group of men she had defrauded earlier.

Mona Lisa decides to leave town and offers to take Charlie with her. Charlie accepts. When they are nearly apprehended by Officer Harold at the airport, Charlie creates a distraction so that Mona Lisa can escape.

== Cast ==
- Kate Hudson as Bonnie "Bonnie Belle" Hunt
- Jun Jong-seo as Mona Lisa Lee
- Craig Robinson as Officer Harold
- Ed Skrein as Fuzz
- Evan Whitten as Charlie Hunt

== Production ==
In October 2018, it was announced Kate Hudson, Craig Robinson, Altonio Jackson, and Zac Efron had joined the cast of the film, with Ana Lily Amirpour directing from a screenplay she wrote, John Lesher serving as a producer under his Le Grisbi Productions banner, Black Bicycle Entertainment producing in association with wiip, and Luke Rodgers acting as executive produce. In April 2019, Jun Jong-seo joined the cast of the film. In July 2019, it was announced Ed Skrein and Evan Whitten had joined the cast of the film, with Skrein replacing Efron.

Principal photography began in July 2019. Alongside original music by Daniele Luppi, the soundtrack includes several songs by Bottin. It was filmed on location in New Orleans, Louisiana.

== Release ==
Mona Lisa and the Blood Moon had its world premiere at the 78th Venice International Film Festival on September 5, 2021. On 15 March 2022, Saban Capital Group acquired the North American distribution rights to the film for release via its dedicated division, Saban Films. It was released in the United States on September 30, 2022.

== Reception ==
On the review aggregator website Rotten Tomatoes, the film holds an approval rating of 74% based on reviews from 68 critics, with an average rating of 6.6/10. The website's critics consensus reads, "Mona Lisa and the Blood Moon finds writer-director Ana Lily Amirpour spinning a stylishly lurid – if somewhat narratively undercooked – fantasy yarn." Metacritic, which uses a weighted average, assigned the film a score of 69 out of 100, based on 19 critics, indicating "generally favorable reviews".

Screen Rant has rated it 3.5 stars.
