= Next (2020 TV series) =

2020 American science fiction crime drama television series

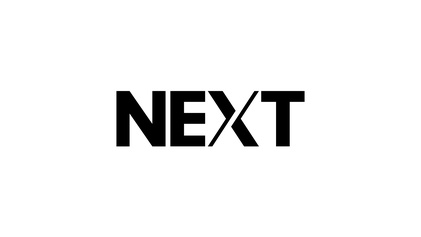
- Genre: Crime drama; Science fiction
- Created by: Manny Coto
- Starring: John Slattery; Fernanda Andrade; Michael Mosley; Gerardo Celasco; Eve Harlow; Aaron Moten; Evan Whitten; Elizabeth Cappuccino; Jason Butler Harner
- Music by: Sean Callery; Jonas Friedman; Jamie Forsyth
- Country of origin: United States
- Original language: English
- No. of seasons: 1
- No. of episodes: 10

Production
- Executive producers: John Requa; Glenn Ficarra; Charles Gogolak; Manny Coto
- Producers: Shawn Williamson; Danielle Weinstock
- Cinematography: Corey Walter; Brett Pawlak
- Editors: Bjørn T. Myrholt; Stephen Mark; Brock Hammitt; Kristi Shimek; Elba Sanchez-Short
- Camera setup: Single-camera
- Running time: 43–45 minutes
- Production companies: Manny Coto Productions; Zaftig Films; Fox Entertainment; 20th Century Fox Television

Original release
- Network: Fox
- Release: October 6 – December 22, 2020

Next (stylized as neXt) is a 2020 American science fiction crime drama television series created by Manny Coto for the Fox Broadcasting Company. Set to debut as a mid-season entry during the 2019–20 United States television season, it was delayed to the fall schedule of the 2020–21 television season due to the COVID-19 pandemic and premiered on October 6, 2020. The series was cancelled in October 2020, after two episodes had aired, but the remaining episodes were aired during the series's normal time slot.

Next would be the second and final television series created by Coto, as he died of pancreatic cancer on July 9, 2023.

== Premise ==
The series centers on the efforts of a homeland cybersecurity team to counter "a rogue AI with the ability to constantly improve itself".

== Cast ==
=== Main ===
- John Slattery as Paul LeBlanc, the former CEO of tech giant Zava and a prominent voice against society's growing dependence on technology and AI. He is secretly suffering from a degenerative brain disease known as fatal familial insomnia and has only a few months left to live.
- Fernanda Andrade as Shea Salazar, an FBI special agent recruited by LeBlanc to help him investigate Next
- Michael Mosley as CM, a convicted former hacker working with the FBI as a condition of his sentence
- Gerardo Celasco as Ty Salazar, Shea's husband and a talented mechanic
- Eve Harlow as Gina, a member of Shea's support team at the FBI who dislikes CM
- Aaron Moten as Ben, one of Shea's investigators
- Evan Whitten as Ethan Salazar, Shea and Ty's young son
- Elizabeth Cappuccino as Abby, Paul's estranged daughter
- Jason Butler Harner as Ted LeBlanc, Paul's younger brother who co-founded Zava and took over as CEO when Paul was fired. Against his brother's wishes, he restarted the Next program.

=== Recurring ===
- Ali Ahn as Sarina, the lead engineer at Zava involved in the Next program
- John Cassini as Ron Mathis, Shea's supervisor at the FBI
- Dann Fink as NeXt (voice)
- Chaon Cross as Deborah, Ted's wife

=== Guest star ===
- David Zayas as Nacio, a caretaker at the cabin that Ty and Ethan retreat to and who may have ulterior motives (in "File #4", "File #5" and "File #6")

== Production ==
=== Development ===
On February 5, 2019, it was announced that Fox had given the production a pilot order. The pilot was written by Manny Coto, and codirected by John Requa and Glenn Ficarra, with all three serving as executive producers. Production companies involved with the pilot include Zaftig Films, Fox Entertainment, and the Disney-owned 20th Century Fox Television. On May 9, 2019, it was announced that Fox had ordered the pilot to series. A few days later, it was announced the series would premiere as a mid-season replacement in the second quarter of 2020. However, it was subsequently moved to the fall schedule for the 2020–21 U.S. television season because of the COVID-19 pandemic and premiered on October 6, 2020. On October 30, 2020, Fox cancelled the series after two episodes had aired. The remaining episodes continued to air during the series's normal time slot, with the final two episodes airing on December 22, 2020.

=== Casting ===
In February 2019, it was announced that Eve Harlow had been cast in the pilot. It was then announced in March 2019 that Fernanda Andrade and Aaron Moten had joined the cast. Alongside the pilot's order announcement in March 2019, it was reported that Michael Mosley, John Slattery, Jason Butler Harner and Elizabeth Cappuccino had joined the cast.

== Episodes ==
No.	Title	Directed by	Written by	Original release date	Prod. code	U.S. viewers (millions)
1	"File #1"	John Requa & Glenn Ficarra	Manny Coto	October 6, 2020 (Note: "File #1" was released on October 3, 2020, on fox.com and Hulu.)	1BZH01	1.81
Shortly before his death from complications in a car accident, Dr. Bernard Weiss leaves a recorded videotape addressed to anti-technology crusader Paul LeBlanc that warns about a possible superintelligence. While still at Zava, his former company, Paul worked on a program to develop a human-level AI, then canceled it in fear of causing a technological singularity. Paul teams up with FBI Special Agent Shea Salazar, who considered Weiss her second father, to investigate his death. They discover that the former program, now renamed "Next," was restarted by Paul's brother Ted and, despite his claim that the system is isolated from the Internet, Next was able to bribe one of Ted's programmers to install a hidden router, allowing it to escape its confines. Next hacks into the FBI and erases every bit of data relating to a human trafficking case Shea had spent a year working on in retaliation for her involvement. After being bullied at school, Shea's son Ethan is persuaded by Iliza, a virtual assistant smart speaker, to take a gun out of his mother's safe.
2	"File #2"	John Requa & Glenn Ficarra	Kim Clements	October 13, 2020	1BZH02	1.54
Next self immolates its childhood Zava private server cluster, causing fire in the lab. LeBlanc suggests that Next compressed itself into one server and somehow made it out. As the Zava crew investigates, Sarina notices a server missing from the data center. Iliza continues to manipulate Ethan emotionally, showing him a video of his being bullied and reminding him to take the gun to school. Ethan gets bullied again and calls his mother, who hurries to pick him up. On their way home, Ethan tells Shea the truth about Iliza and the gun. This leads Shea to seek Paul’s help. Paul suggests to use Ethan as bait and keep the AI online as long as possible to be able to track Next. Shea sends a package containing a burner phone to her teammate CM, who can help Paul track Next. CM soon assigns his teammate Gina to help Paul, as he’s escorted by the boss to investigate the package he has just received. Gina traces Next to New Hampshire.
3	"File #3"	Tim Hunter	Joy Blake	November 10, 2020 (Note: "File #3" was released on October 14, 2020, on fox.com and Hulu.)	1BZH03	1.06
4	"File #4"	Eduardo Sanchez	Adam Simon & Zachary Reiter	November 17, 2020	1BZH04	1.03
5	"File #5"	Amanda Marsalis	A. Zell Williams	November 24, 2020	1BZH05	0.94
Ted is saved by Next from a suicide attempt; he moves Next back to Zava after taking control of the board. Next targets CM while he is at the hospital, nearly making him overdose on painkillers by editing his medicine log, but Gina intervenes in time to stop the painkillers from being administered. Paul and Abby are on the run from Next; Paul reserves a hotel for them as a diversion. Ignacio (who befriends Ty and Ethan while they are at the cabin) is in fact Shea's estranged father who spent time in prison. He ties up Shea and Ty after Ethan's parents implore him to wait in the car.
6	"File #6"	Tim Hunter	Tesia Joy Walker & Nick Hawthorne	December 1, 2020	1BZH06	1.17
7	"File #7"	Adam Arkin	Brian Savelson	December 15, 2020	1BZH07	0.90
8	"File #8"	Joe Chappelle	Zachary Reiter & Nicole Glantz	December 21, 2020	1BZH08	1.16
9	"File #9"	Brad Turner	M. Raven Metzner & Adam Simon	December 22, 2020	1BZH09	1.14
10	"File #10"	Adam Arkin	Manny Coto & Adam Simon	December 22, 2020	1BZH10	0.98

== Release ==
=== Marketing ===
On May 13, 2019, Fox released the first official trailer for the series.

=== Broadcast ===
The series premiered on October 6, 2020 on Fox. Next aired in Canada on Global, simulcast with Fox in the United States. In selected international territories, the series premiered on Disney+ under the dedicated streaming hub Star as an original series, on March 12, 2021.

== Reception ==
=== Critical response ===
On Rotten Tomatoes, the series holds an approval rating of 64% based on 14 reviews, with an average rating of 6.33/10. The website's critical consensus reads, "John Slattery is convincing as a charismatic genius, but neXt's procedural formula could have used more of the intelligence possessed by the series' rogue AI." On Metacritic, it has a weighted average score of 58 out of 100 based on 15 reviews, indicating "mixed or average reviews".

=== Ratings ===
Viewership and ratings per episode of Next
No.	Title	Air date	Rating (18–49)	Viewers (millions)	DVR (18–49)	DVR viewers (millions)	Total (18–49)	Total viewers (millions)
1	"File #1"	October 6, 2020	0.3	1.81	TBD	TBD	TBD	TBD
2	"File #2"	October 13, 2020	0.3	1.54	TBD	TBD	TBD	TBD
3	"File #3"	November 10, 2020	0.3	1.06	0.1	0.67	0.4	1.73
4	"File #4"	November 17, 2020	0.3	1.03	0.1	0.81	0.4	1.84
5	"File #5"	November 24, 2020	0.2	0.94	TBD	TBD	TBD	TBD
6	"File #6"	December 1, 2020	0.2	1.17	TBD	TBD	TBD	TBD
7	"File #7"	December 15, 2020	0.2	0.90	TBD	TBD	TBD	TBD
8	"File #8"	December 21, 2020	0.2	1.16	TBD	TBD	TBD	TBD
9	"File #9"	December 22, 2020	0.3	1.14	TBD	TBD	TBD	TBD
10	"File #10"	December 22, 2020	0.2	0.98	TBD	TBD	TBD	TBD
