= Evan Whitten =

American actor

- Born: Bakersfield, California, U.S.
- Occupation: Actor
- Years active: 2018–present

Evan Whitten is an American actor. On television, he played Ethan Salazar in the 2020 Fox television series Next, young Elliot in Mr. Robot (2019), and Jacen Syndulla in Ahsoka (2023). In film, he portrayed Alex opposite Christian Slater and Demián Bichir in the 2023 Netflix film Chupa. He also portrayed Charlie in the 2021 film Mona Lisa and the Blood Moon. He won the Young Artist Award for Best Guest Starring Performance in a TV Series for portraying Henry Barnett in The Resident.

== Early life ==
He was born and raised in Bakersfield, California.

== Filmography ==
=== Film ===
Year	Title	Role	Notes
2018	Destroyer	Young Boy	Uncredited
2020	Dino Dana: The Movie	Mateo Alvarez	
2020	Words on Bathroom Walls	Ricky	
2021	Mona Lisa and the Blood Moon	Charlie Hunt	
2023	Chupa	Alex	

=== Television ===
Year	Title	Role	Notes
2018	Nicky, Ricky, Dicky & Dawn	PFC Garcia	Episode: "Sympathy for the Squishy"
2018	The Rookie	Jacob	Episode: "The Good, the Bad and the Ugly"
2018–2019	The Resident	Henry Barnett	6 episodes
2019	Mr. Robot	Young Elliot	6 episodes
2020	Penny Dreadful: City of Angels	Young Tiago	Episode: "Santa Muerte"
2020	Next	Ethan Salazar	Series regular
2021	Big Sky	Erik Westergaard	2 episodes
2023	I Think You Should Leave with Tim Robinson	Tony	Episode: "That Was the Earth Telling Me I'm Supposed to Do Something Great."
2023	Ahsoka	Jacen Syndulla	3 episodes
