= Ninna Pálmadóttir =

Icelandic film director

Ninna Pálmadóttir is an Icelandic film director. She is most noted for her 2019 short film Paperboy, which was the winner of the Edda Award for Best Short Film in 2020.

The film was also the winner of the award for Best Short Film at the 2019 Reykjavik International Film Festival, and the award for Best Short Film at the 2020 Stockfish Film Festival.

She also directed the short films Little Rocks in 2015, and All Dogs Die (Allir Hundar Deyja) in 2020.

Her debut feature film, Solitude, premiered in the Discovery program at the 2023 Toronto International Film Festival.
