= Stockfish Film Festival =

Film festival in Reykjavík, Iceland

Stockfish Film & Industry Festival
- Location: Reykjavik
- Predecessor: Reykjavík Film Festival
- Founded: 2015
- Directors: Carolina Salas
- Artistic director: Hrönn Kristinsdóttir
- Website: stockfishfestival.is

Stockfish Film Festival is an international film festival in Reykjavík, Iceland. The festival takes place in the only art house cinema in Iceland, Bíó Paradís, late February every year and lasts for eleven days. The festival aims to create a platform in Reykjavík to encourage collaboration between domestic and international film communities.

== History ==
The festival was founded in 2015, as a reincarnation of the Reykjavík Film Festival (Icelandic: Kvikmyndahátíð í Reykjavík), which was established in 1978. It appeals to both people in the film industry and those who are interested in the wellbeing of international filmmaking. The festival is a collaboration between all of the film professional associations in Iceland and the festival's Board of Directors includes members of the major film professional associations in Iceland. In 2023, Hrönn Kristinsdóttir and Carolina Salas were appointed its artistic director and managing director.

== Profile ==
=== Films ===
The festival screens some of the most up-and-coming art-house films in the world. All the feature films are handpicked by the board members and the festival, therefore, does not accept submissions of feature films. Each year the festival screens over 30 international and Icelandic award-winning films, most of which would not be otherwise screened in Iceland.

=== Sections ===
Every year the festival offers a wide range of lectures, workshops, masterclasses, panels, ceremonies, parties and other events to support its goal of encouraging collaboration between Icelandic and international film professionals and those who are interested in filmmaking in an international scale.

The events can vary based on the focus each year, but there are two special events the festival takes its pride in every year, the Shortfish competition and Works in progress:

Shortfish

The festival aims to support Icelandic future filmmakers with the festival's short film competition Shortfish (Icelandic: Sprettfiskurinn). The criteria of the films are that they are not longer than 30 minutes and be less than 1 years old. The festival only accepts Icelandic short films, that is, the films either have to have an Icelandic director and/or producer.

Apart from the prestigious price of gaining the title the Shortfish, the winner of the competition also gets an award that aims to help said filmmaker to make future projects. The winners of the competition after 2017 receive 1 million kr. in equipment rental from Kukl.

The films in the competition are usually screened a few times during the festival, with at least one Q&A screening.

Works in progress

Works in Progress provides international press and film industry professionals a unique chance to see what Icelandic filmmakers are working on during each festival. Icelandic filmmakers are invited to screen a 5–15 minute preview of their work followed by a Q&A with the audience. Usually this event takes place twice each festival so to give each international guest an opportunity to attend.

The list of awards includes Best Documentary Short, Best Narrative Short, Best Experimental Short, Best Music Video, and Eva Maria Daniels Award for Vital Filmmaking.

=== Special guests ===
The festival invites international filmmakers to discuss the state of filmmaking, industry, and community with the public and Icelandic filmmakers. Both the international and Icelandic filmmakers attending the festival participate in Q&A screenings, panels, lectures, workshops, masterclasses and other events. This creates the platform between different filmmakers to discuss – and even collaborate on future projects.

Some of the past guests of the festival include; Jóhann Jóhannsson, Rachid Bouchareb, László Rajk, Sturla Brandt Grøvlen, Iram Haq, Harutyun Khachatryan and many more.

== Winners of Shortfish ==
Year	Film	Director	Ref
2015	Foxes	Mikel Gurrea	
2016	Like It’s Up to You	Brynhildur Þórarinsdóttir	
2017	Vitamin-C	Guðný Rós Þórhallsdóttir	
2018	Viktoria	Brúsi Ólason	
2019	XY	Anna Karín Lárusdóttir	
2020	Paperboy	Ninna Pálmadóttir	
2021	Kitchen by Measure	Atli Arnarsson, Sólrún Ylfa	
2022	The Nest	Hlynur Pálmason	
2023	Felt Cute	Anna Karín Lárusdóttir	
