= Mali Obomsawin =

First Nations musical artist

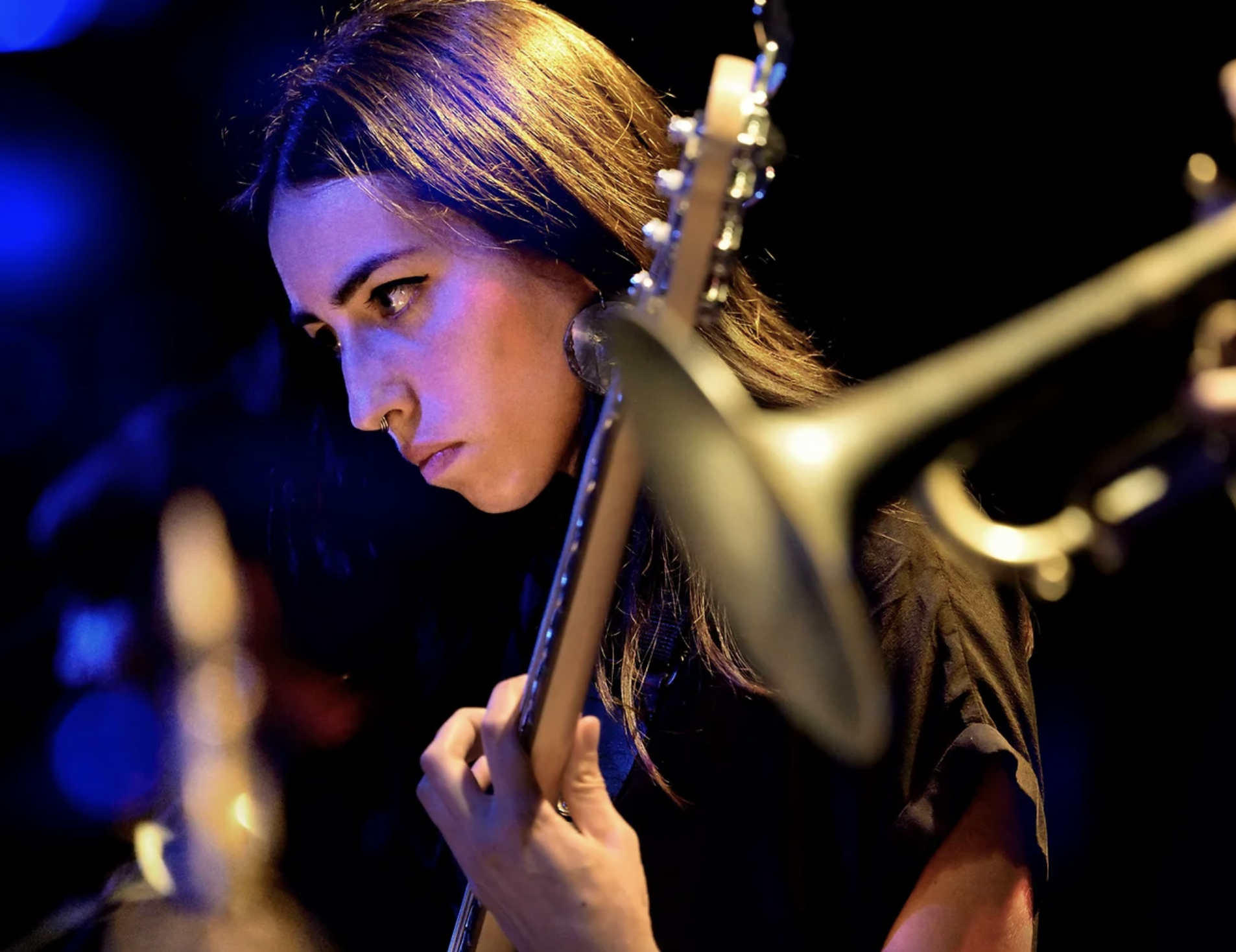
- Obomsawin in 2022

Background information
- Born: July 19, 1995 (age 31); Stratford, New Hampshire, U.S.
- Genres: Jazz, free jazz, folk music, roots, rock, contemporary indigenous
- Instruments: Double Bass, Electric Bass, Voice, Guitar
- Years active: 2014-present
- Labels: Smithsonian Folkways Recordings, Out Of Your Head Records
- Website: maliobomsawin.com

Mali Obomsawin is a musician from Abenaki First Nation at Odanak. An award-winning bassist, vocalist, songwriter, and composer, Obomsawin is a cross-genre artist specializing in free-jazz, rock, and American roots music. Her debut solo album Sweet Tooth (2022) received international acclaim.

== Early life ==
Obomsawin was born in Stratford, New Hampshire. She is an enrolled member of Abenaki First Nation at Odanak in Quebec, and of Sephardic Jewish Descent. She is the granddaughter of writer/activist Paul Goodman, and cousin of renowned Abenaki musician, filmmaker and activist Alanis Obomsawin. Obomsawin grew up in Farmington, Maine, and began playing double bass at age ten.

== Education ==
Obomsawin attended Berklee College of Music in 2013 before transferring to Dartmouth College where she obtained dual degrees in French and government in 2018.

== Career ==
=== Music ===
In 2014, Obomsawin joined her first band, the folk-rock trio Lula Wiles, who would go on to tour extensively in the US, Canada, and Germany, receiving acclaim for their renowned three part harmony singing and innovative songwriting. Signing with Smithsonian Folkways Recordings in 2018, Lula Wiles released three well-received recordings before disbanding in 2021.

Obomsawin performs as an accompanist with Jake Blount, Peter Apfelbaum, Taylor Ho Bynum, Bill Cole's Untempered Ensemble. and The Julia Keefe Indigenous Big Band.

Obomsawin's debut solo album, Sweet Tooth was released October 28, 2022 on Out Of Your Head Records to international acclaim, receiving praise from Jazz Times "album of the day" Financial Times “Critic’s Choice,” and The Guardian’s "Folk Album of the Month" for November 2022. The album was coproduced by Obomsawin and Taylor Ho Bynum.

In 2023, Obomsawin's music was featured in season 3 of the television series "Reservation Dogs" (Deer Lady, episode 3) on FX on Hulu. She also scored the National Geographic Documentary Sugarcane, which premiered at Sundance Film Festival in January 2024.

In 2024, Obomsawin independently released her sophomore album under the alias Deerlady, a duo with guitarist Magdalena Abrego. She also released a collaborative album with Jake Blount, titled "symbiont" on Smithsonian Folkways Recordings. On December 10, 2024, National Geographic released Obomsawin's original score of Sugarcane on Hollywood Records.

== Discography ==
As Mali Obomsawin

Title	Details	Type
Sugarcane (Original Motion Picture Soundtrack)	Label: Hollywood Records; Release date: Dec 10, 2024	Soundtrack
Sweet Tooth	Label: Out Of Your Head Records; Release date: Oct 28, 2022	Studio Album

As Deerlady

Title	Details	Type
Greatest Hits	Label: Self-released; Release date: Jan 19, 2024	Studio Album

With Lula Wiles

Title	Details	Type
Shame and Sedition	Label: Smithsonian Folkways; Release date: May 21, 2021	Studio Album
It's Cool	Label: Smithsonian Folkways; Release date: Nov 8, 2019	Single
What Will We Do	Label: Smithsonian Folkways; Release date: Jan 25, 2019	Studio Album

With Jake Blount

Title	Details	Type
Symbiont	Label: Smithsonian Folkways Recordings; Release date: Sep 27, 2024	Studio Album
