= Julian Brave NoiseCat =

Indigenous climate activist and writer

Julian Brave NoiseCat is an American and Canadian writer, filmmaker, and activist who is an enrolled member of the Canim Lake Band Tsq'secen of the Secwepemc (Shuswap) Nation in British Columbia, Canada. He is a public thinker and advocate on issues of climate justice and Indigenous rights in North America. His debut documentary Sugarcane directed alongside Emily Kassie won the Directing Award at the 2024 Sundance Film Festival and was nominated for an Oscar in 2025, making NoiseCat the first filmmaker Indigenous to North America nominated for an Academy Award.

== Early life and education ==
Born in Minnesota, NoiseCat was raised by his mother in Oakland, California. NoiseCat attended Columbia University and graduated in 2015 with a degree in history. After being awarded a Clarendon Scholarship, he studied history at the University of Oxford and earned a graduate degree in global and imperial history.

== Career ==
NoiseCat began his career as a political strategist and policy analyst. While working as vice president of policy and strategy at Data for Progress, NoiseCat was a prominent voice in the campaign to have Deb Haaland, an enrolled citizen of the Laguna Pueblo tribe and one of the first Native American women elected to the United States Congress, nominated and later confirmed as the 54th United States Secretary of the Interior. He also served as a key policy thinker behind the Green New Deal movements in both the United States and Canada, with a particular emphasis on centering Indigenous communities in environmental justice work.

Video of NoiseCat at Alcatraz Island for Native American Heritage Month, 2019

Beyond the policy world, NoiseCat has participated in cultural organizing work. He developed the 2019 Alcatraz Canoe Journey alongside a group of veteran Native American activists, including LaNada War Jack and Eloy Martinez. During the canoe journey, 18 canoes representing dozens of nations and tribes encircled Alcatraz Island in the San Francisco Bay to honor the history of Native activists occupying the island between November 1969 and June 1971 and to remember the many Native people who were incarcerated on the island as prisoners of war. The paddlers planned their journey to roughly coincide with both the 50th anniversary of the island's occupation as well as Indigenous People's Day. Afterward, the San Francisco Museum of Modern Art held a series of talks on Native histories of Alcatraz Island.

In addition to his policy and organizing work, NoiseCat has worked as a journalist and a cultural commentator on Indigenous and climate issues. He has published articles, essays, and reviews in The New York Times, The Washington Post, The Atlantic, The Paris Review, Politico, The Guardian, and Canadian Geographic. In 2021, Time magazine included him in their Time 100 list of next generation leaders. The magazine commissioned environmental activist Bill McKibben to write the brief description that accompanied NoiseCat's inclusion in the list. NoiseCat was awarded an American Mosaic Journalism Prize in 2022.

In 2023, NoiseCat signed with publisher Alfred A. Knopf to release a book, which became We Survived the Night, focused on Indigenous peoples of the United States and Canada. He is also co-director of the documentary film, Sugarcane, which investigates unmarked graves at Indian residential schools. Sugarcane had its world premiere at the 2024 Sundance Film Festival on January 20, 2024 where it won the Grand Jury award for Directing. The film was also nominated for Best Documentary Feature film at the 97th Academy Awards, making NoiseCat the first Indigenous filmmaker from North America to be nominated for an Oscar.

== Name ==
Notwithstanding an anecdote that the name "NoiseCat" derives from the 1959 incident in which NoiseCat's father, as a newborn at an Indian residential school, was abandoned in a trash incinerator, where he was found by a night watchman who purportedly thought the infant's crying sounded like a cat, it actually has nothing to do with noises or cats. "NoiseCat" was a bastardization of the ancestral name "Newísket", which might mean "Long Day" or "Tall Timber Day", but unfortunately nobody remembers the exact meaning of the name.

== Accolades ==
| Year | Organization Name | Category | Work | Result |
|---|---|---|---|---|
| 2017 | National Native Media Awards | Best Editorial | | Won |
| 2018 | Canadian National Magazine Awards | Best New Magazine Writer | | Nominated |
| 2018 | National Native Media Awards | Best Editorial Writing | | Won |
| 2018 | National Native Media Awards | Best Feature Story | | Won |
| 2018 | National Native Media Awards | Best Column | | Won |
| 2019 | Canadian National Magazine Awards | Feature Writing | | Nominated |
| 2019 | Livingston Awards | Local Reporting | | Nominated |
| 2019 | National Native Media Awards | Best Print Feature | "A tale of two housing crises, rural and urban" | Won |
| 2020 | Canadian Digital Publish Awards | Best Arts & Culture Storytelling | | Silver |
| 2020 | Canadian Digital Publish Awards | Best Arts & Culture Storytelling | | Nominated |
| 2021 | Canadian National Magazine Awards | Long-Form Feature Writing 6,000+ | | Nominated |
| 2021 | Mirror Awards | Best Commentary | | Nominated |
| 2021 | Time 100 | Next | | Won |
| 2022 | American Mosaic Journalism Prize | | | Won |
| 2023 | Online Journalism Awards | Topical Reporting: Race, Ethnicity, Gender and Identity, Small Newsroom | Who's Your People? | Nominated |
| 2024 | Critics' Choice Documentary Awards | Best Political Documentary | Sugarcane | Won |
| 2024 | Critics' Choice Documentary Awards | Best True Crime Documentary | Sugarcane | Won |
| 2024 | Sundance Film Festival Jury Prize | Directing, Screenwriting and Editing – U.S. Documentary | Sugarcane | Won |
| 2025 | Academy Awards | Best Documentary Feature Film | Sugarcane | Nominated |
| 2025 | Directors Guild of America Awards | Award for Outstanding Directing – Documentaries | Sugarcane | Nominated |
| 2025 | National Board of Review | Best Documentary | Sugarcane | Won |
| 2026 | BC and Yukon Book Prizes | Hubert Evans Non-Fiction Prize | We Survived the Night: An Indigenous Reckoning | Won |
