= Three Promises =

Three Promises is a 2023 Palestinian documentary film directed by Yousef Srouji, and produced by Marielle Olentine, that won the Harrell Award for Best Documentary at the 19th Annual Camden Film Festival. The story revolves around a mother and her two children in Palestine during the Second Intifada.

Three Promises is available for streaming in the MENA Region on Shahid and will be available for streaming in North America and beyond on June 10, 2025.

== Plot ==
The story is set in the early 2000s in the West Bank Palestine during Second Intifada, where Suha, mother of Yousef, director of the documentary, films her daily routine during the intense retaliatory attacks of Israelis. When Yousef finds the archive of his mother's reels, he turns the footage into a documentary.

The documentary is a story of Suha and her two children's frequent hiding in the basement from Israeli attack, mother's unwilling determination to leave the country, and unanswered questions of the children. The cast comprise: Suha Khamis, Yousef Srouji, Ramzi Srouji, and Dima Srouji. It is actual footage of the family and consists of the events recorded by Suha, mother of the director.

== Reception ==
The film has a rating of 8.6/10 of 18 reviews on IMDb as of 26 November 2023. Tomatometer-Approved Film Critic Wael Khairy highly recommends the film.

Three Promises is currently available to stream in North America and most English-speaking countries on Apple TV, Amazon Prime, and Vimeo-On-Demand. It is also available on Shahid in the Middle East and North Africa Region. Distribution in North America is handled by Watermelon Pictures, and in the MENA region it is handled by CMS Gulf.

== Awards & recognition ==
- Finalist for the Henry Award for Public Interest Documentary in 2025.
- Harrell Award for Best Documentary at Camden International Film Festival 2023.
- Alphapanda Award at Cannes Film Festival's docs-in-progress screening as part of Marché Du Film.
- Won two work-in-progress awards at Amman International Film Festival's Industry Days (AFID).
- Won three work-in-progress awards at Malmo Arab Film Festival Industry Days.
- Recommended for International Documentary Film Festival Amsterdam (IDFA) ^{19}
- Visions du Réel • Nyon (Switzerland) • International Medium and Short Film Competition - World Premiere
- Received both Arab Fund for Arts & Culture (AFAC) Documentary Program's production and post production grants.
