= Dan Habib =

American documentary film director, producer, and cinematographer

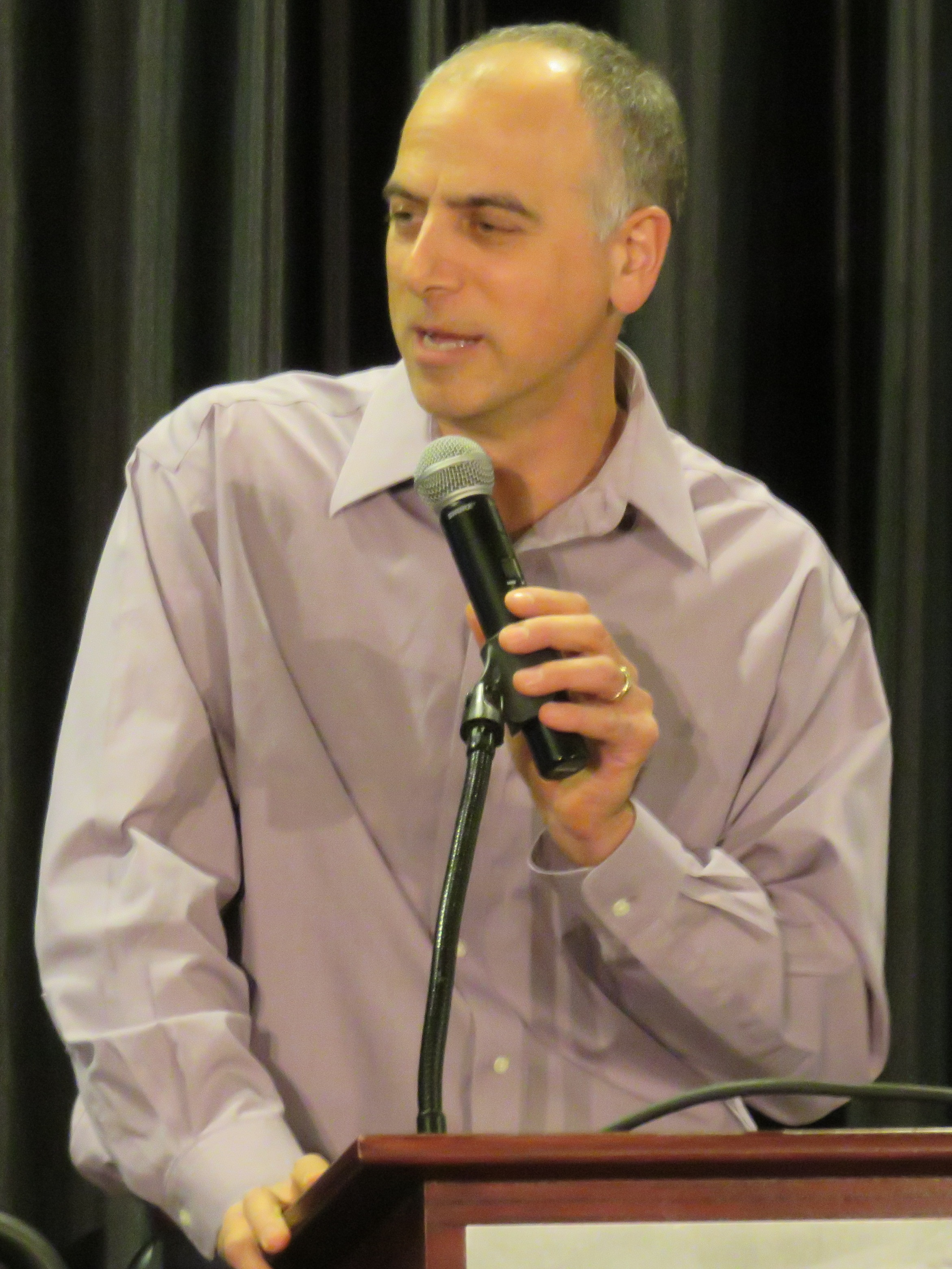
Dan Habib addressing TASH's 40th Anniversary Annual Conference, Portland, Oregon, 3 December 2015

Dan Habib is an American documentary film director, producer, and cinematographer based in Concord, New Hampshire. His award-winning films on disability-related topics include Who Cares About Kelsey?, Including Samuel, Intelligent Lives, Restraint and Seclusion: Hear Our Stories, and several short documentaries. His films have been Emmy-nominated, translated into 17 languages, and used worldwide to support inclusive education and disability rights.

In 2022, Habib released the documentary short My Disability Roadmap, co-directed with his son Samuel Habib. The film made its world premiere at Hot Docs Canadian International Documentary Festival on May 1, 2022, and streamed as part of The New York Times Op-Docs series. The film consists of interviews between Samuel and prominent disability activists around the United States, and also shows some of the challenges that the Habibs experienced in traveling to those locations. The film also discusses Samuel's interest in dating as a disabled person.

In 2024, Habib and his son released a feature-length documentary The Ride Ahead.

Habib began his career as a photo editor for the Concord Monitor, before becoming involved in disability rights activism. In 2014, he was named a member of the President's Committee for People with Intellectual Disabilities by the Obama administration. Awards and honors for Habib include the Justice for All Grassroots Award from the American Association of People with Disabilities in 2013 and the Champion of Human and Civil Rights Award from the National Education Association (New Hampshire) in 2012.

== Bibliography ==
- Guerra, Cristela (9 May 2018). "Documentary by NH Filmmaker Dan Habib Redefines what it Means to be Intelligent". Boston Globe. Archived from the original on 11 May 2018.
