= Emily Kassie =

Canadian filmmaker and investigative journalist

Emily Kassie (born December 15, 1992) is a Canadian filmmaker and investigative journalist. Her work has focused on conflict, human rights and abuses of power. She directed, produced and shot the documentary Sugarcane (2024), which won the U.S. Documentary Directing Award at the 2024 Sundance Film Festival and was nominated for the Academy Award for Best Documentary Feature.

== Early life and education ==
Kassie was born in Toronto and graduated with honors from Brown University. She was awarded a Gates Cambridge Scholarship to the University of Cambridge, where she completed an MPhil in international relations and politics.

In 2015, her short documentary I Married My Family's Killer, about intermarriage in post-genocide Rwanda, won a Student Academy Award. The film was later broadcast by the CBC.

== Career ==
In 2016, Kassie received a World Press Photo award for an investigation into DuPont's chemical contamination in West Virginia. The following year, her reporting on the refugee crisis in Niger, Turkey, Italy and Germany received an Overseas Press Club Award and a National Magazine Award.

Kassie subsequently oversaw visual journalism at Highline, HuffPost's investigative magazine, and served as director of visual projects at The Marshall Project.

In 2019, Kassie's New York Times documentary on sexual abuse in U.S. immigration detention was presented during Senate Judiciary Committee hearings on family separation and received a World Press Photo award and an Emmy nomination. She won a second National Magazine Award in 2020 for her reporting on immigration detention, which was also nominated for a Peabody Award.

In 2021, Kassie directed a Frontline documentary following an undocumented family during the COVID-19 pandemic, which received an Emmy nomination. That year, she reported from Taliban-held Afghanistan with PBS NewsHour correspondent Jane Ferguson ahead of the fall of Kabul. Their reporting formed part of PBS NewsHour's coverage of Afghanistan that received an Overseas Press Club Award.

=== Sugarcane ===
Kassie made her feature directorial debut with Sugarcane, co-directed with Julian Brave NoiseCat. Kassie also served as a producer and cinematographer on the film, which follows an investigation into abuse and missing children at a former Indian residential school in British Columbia.

Sugarcane premiered at the 2024 Sundance Film Festival, where Kassie and NoiseCat won the U.S. Documentary Directing Award. The film was subsequently acquired by National Geographic Documentary Films for theatrical and streaming distribution.

The film received the National Board of Review Award for Best Documentary and two Critics' Choice Documentary Awards. It was screened at the White House and included on Barack Obama's list of favorite films of 2024. In 2025, Kassie, NoiseCat and producer Kellen Quinn were nominated for the Academy Award for Best Documentary Feature.

== Selected awards and nominations ==
Year	Organization	Category	Result
2025	Academy Awards	Best Documentary Feature	Nominated
2025	Directors Guild of America Awards	Outstanding Directorial Achievement in Documentary	Nominated
2025	Cinema Eye Honors	Outstanding Achievement in Cinematography	Won
2024	National Board of Review	Best Documentary	Won
2024	Critics' Choice Documentary Awards	Best Political Documentary / Best True Crime Documentary	Won
2024	Sundance Film Festival	U.S. Documentary Directing Award	Won
2021	Overseas Press Club Award	Peter Jennings Award	Won
2020	National Magazine Awards	Multimedia	Won
2019	News and Documentary Emmy Awards	Hard News Feature	Nominated
2019	World Press Photo	Digital Storytelling	Won
2017	National Magazine Awards	Multimedia	Won
2017	Overseas Press Club Award	Digital Reporting on International Affairs	Won
2016	World Press Photo	Immersive Storytelling	Won
2015	Student Academy Award	Documentary	Won
