= Brendan Bellomo =

American film director and editor

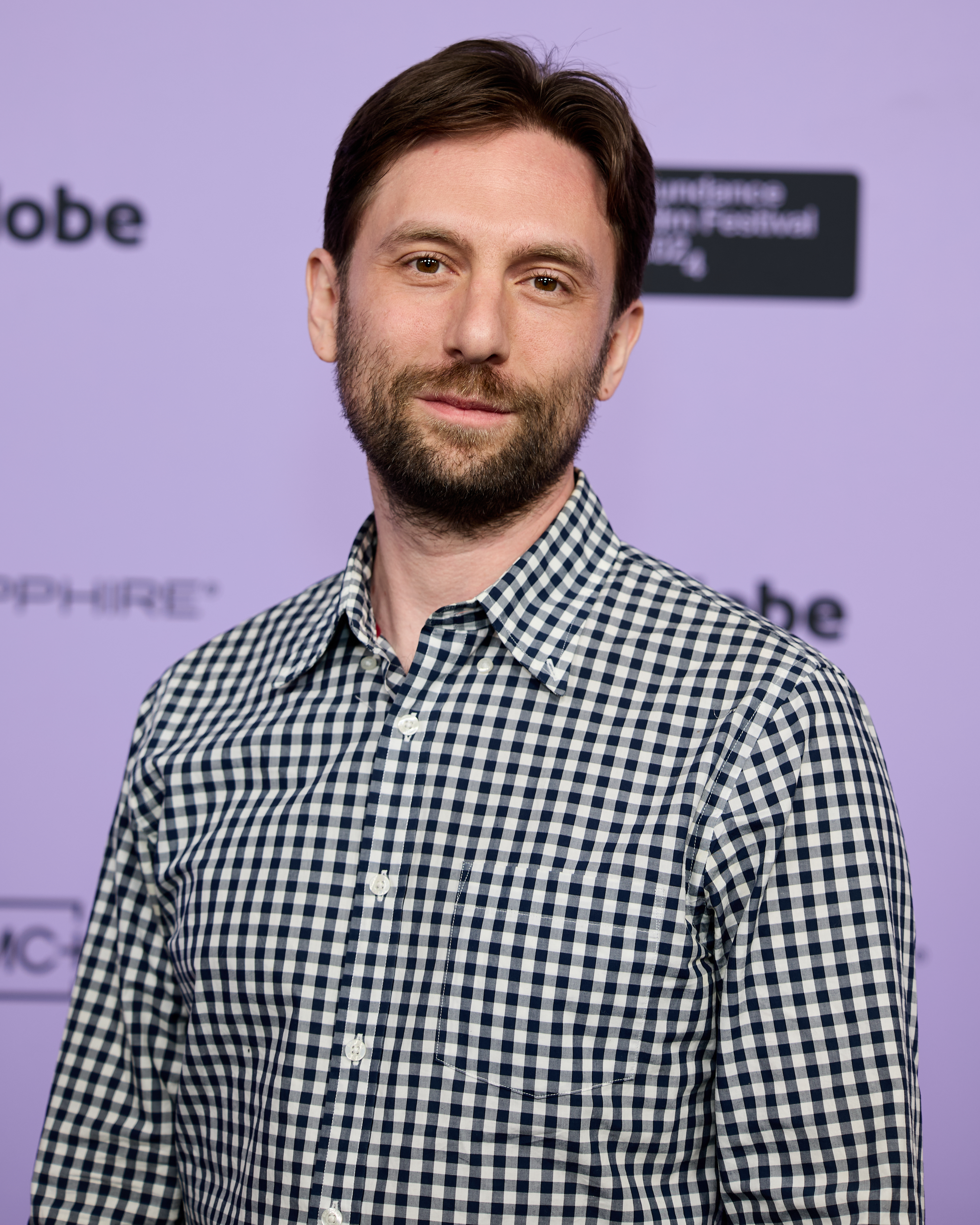
- Education: New York University Tisch School of the Arts, 2008
- Notable work: Porcelain War (2024)
- Website: brendanbellomo.com

Brendan Bellomo is an American film director and producer. His debut feature documentary Porcelain War (2024), premiered at the 2024 Sundance Film Festival and later earned Bellemo a nomination for the Academy Award for Best Documentary Feature and won him the DGA award for Outstanding Directorial Achievement in Documentaries.

== Early life and education ==
Bellomo is an alumnus of New York University’s Tisch School of the Arts. During this time, he directed the science fiction short film Bohemibot. which won the Academy Award for Student Narrative.

== Work ==
Bellomo gained recognition for his short film Bohemibot, a Sci-Fi drama that combines live-action and CGI. Bohemibot tells the story of a cyborg harpist who, after being forced to serve as a pilot in the last war on his planet, struggles with a debilitating injury and the loss of his family. The film was created as an NYU Tisch School of the Arts Advanced Production under the supervision of Professor Ezra Sacks and independent animator & Professor John Canemaker. It won a Student Academy Award in 2009.

Bellomo's work on Bohemibot involved the collaboration of over 90 students and 80 professionals from various fields. The film was supported by the Panavision New Filmmakers Program and Renegade Effects Group, which contributed essential props and costumes.

In December, 2011, Bellomo was announced as the director for the film adaptation of Charles Yu's novel How to Live Safely in a Science Fictional Universe. The project was to be produced by Michael Barnathan and Chris Columbus' 1492 Pictures, which had acquired the film rights.

Bellomo executive produced and received a story credit on the 2023 film Chupa.

In 2024, Bellomo co-directed and edited the documentary Porcelain War, which captured the lives of Ukrainian artists Anya Stasenko, Slava Leontyev and Andrey Stefanov during the Russian invasion of Ukraine.

== Filmography ==
List of film credits of Brendan Bellomo
Year	Title	Notes
2009	Bohemibot	Director; short film
2023	Chupa	Story and executive producer
2024	Porcelain War	Director and editor

== Awards and recognition ==
Award	Date	Category	Result	Ref.
Student Academy Award	13 June 2009	Narrative	3rd place	
Sundance Film Festival	28 January 2024	U.S. Documentary Grand Jury Prize	Won	
Sarasota Film Festival	14 April 2024	Special Jury Mention	Won	
San Francisco International Film Festival	28 April 2024	Best Documentary Feature	Nominated	
Seattle International Film Festival	27 May 2024	Best Documentary	Won	
Critics' Choice Documentary Awards	10 November 2024	Best New Documentary Filmmaker(s)	Nominated	
Cinema Eye Honors	9 January 2024	Outstanding Visual Design	Nominated	
Satellite Awards	26 January 2025	Best Motion Picture – Documentary	Nominated	
AACTA Awards	7 February 2025	Best Documentary	Nominated	
Directors Guild of America Awards	8 February 2025	Outstanding Directorial Achievement in Documentaries	Won	
Academy Awards	2 March 2025	Best Documentary Feature Film	Nominated	
