= National Board of Review Awards 2024 =

American film awards

96th NBR Awards
- Date: December 4, 2024; January 7, 2025 (ceremony)
- Location: Cipriani 42nd Street, New York City
- Hosted by: Willie Geist

Highlights
- Best Film: Wicked

The 96th National Board of Review Awards, honoring the best in film for 2024, were announced on December 4, 2024. The musical fantasy Wicked, the first installment of a two-part adaptation of the stage musical of the same name, won the most awards with three: Best Film, Best Director (Jon M. Chu), and the NBR Spotlight Award for the creative collaboration of Cynthia Erivo and Ariana Grande. It is also the first fantasy film to win Best Film at this event, as well as the first musical film to win the award since Moulin Rouge! (2001).

The annual awards gala was held on January 7, 2025, at Cipriani 42nd Street in New York City, hosted by television personality and journalist Willie Geist.

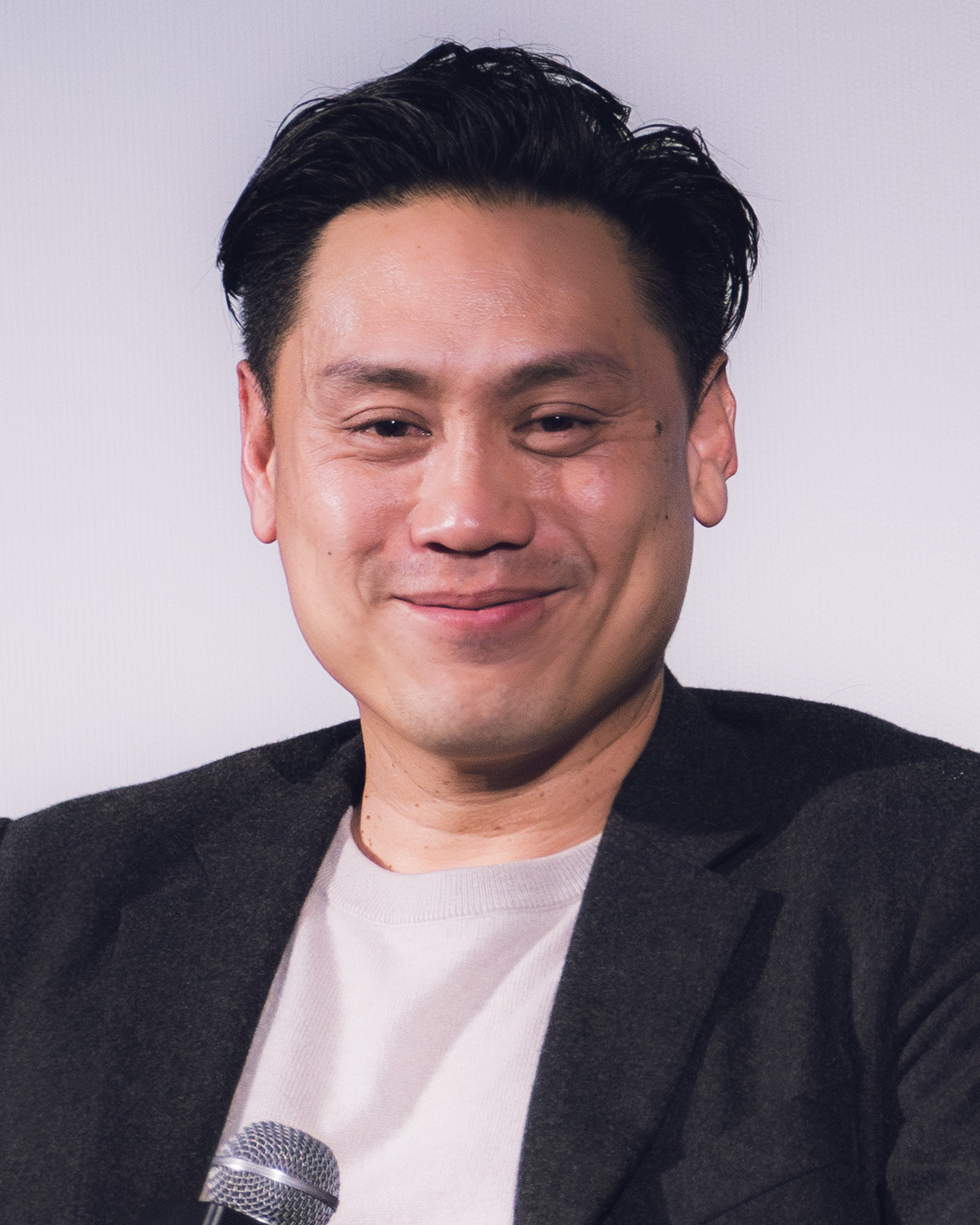
Jon M. Chu, Best Director winner

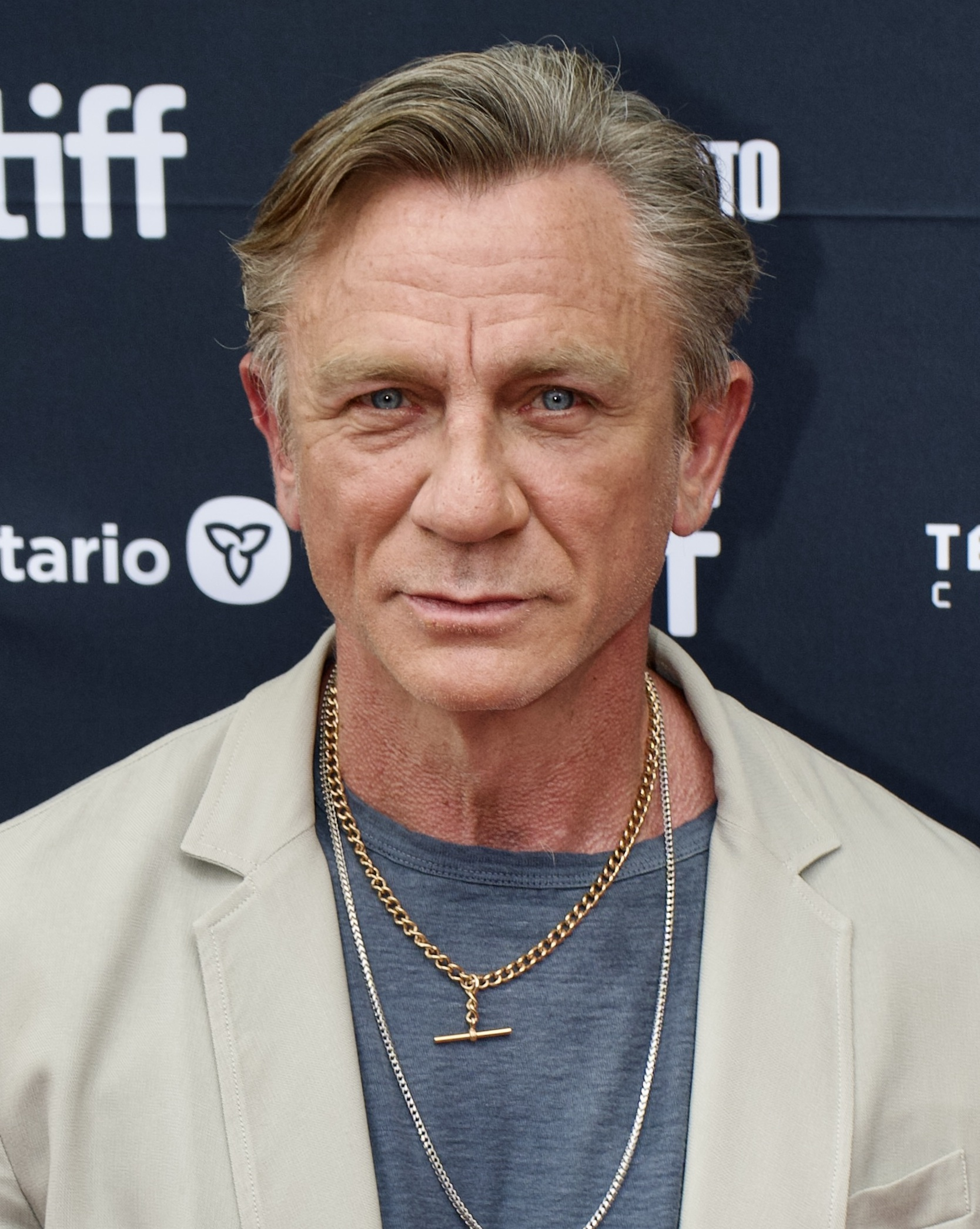
Daniel Craig, Best Actor winner

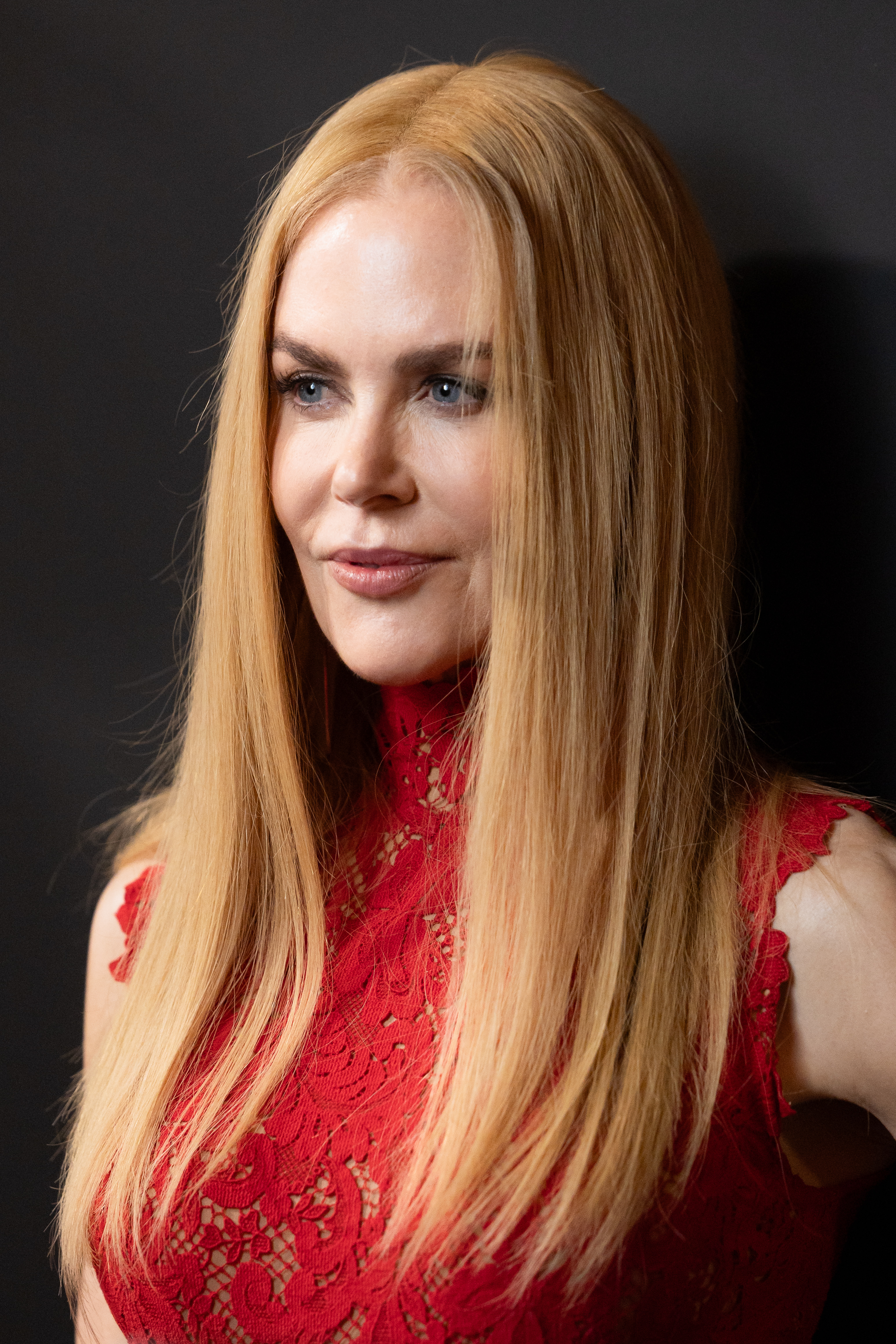
Nicole Kidman, Best Actress winner

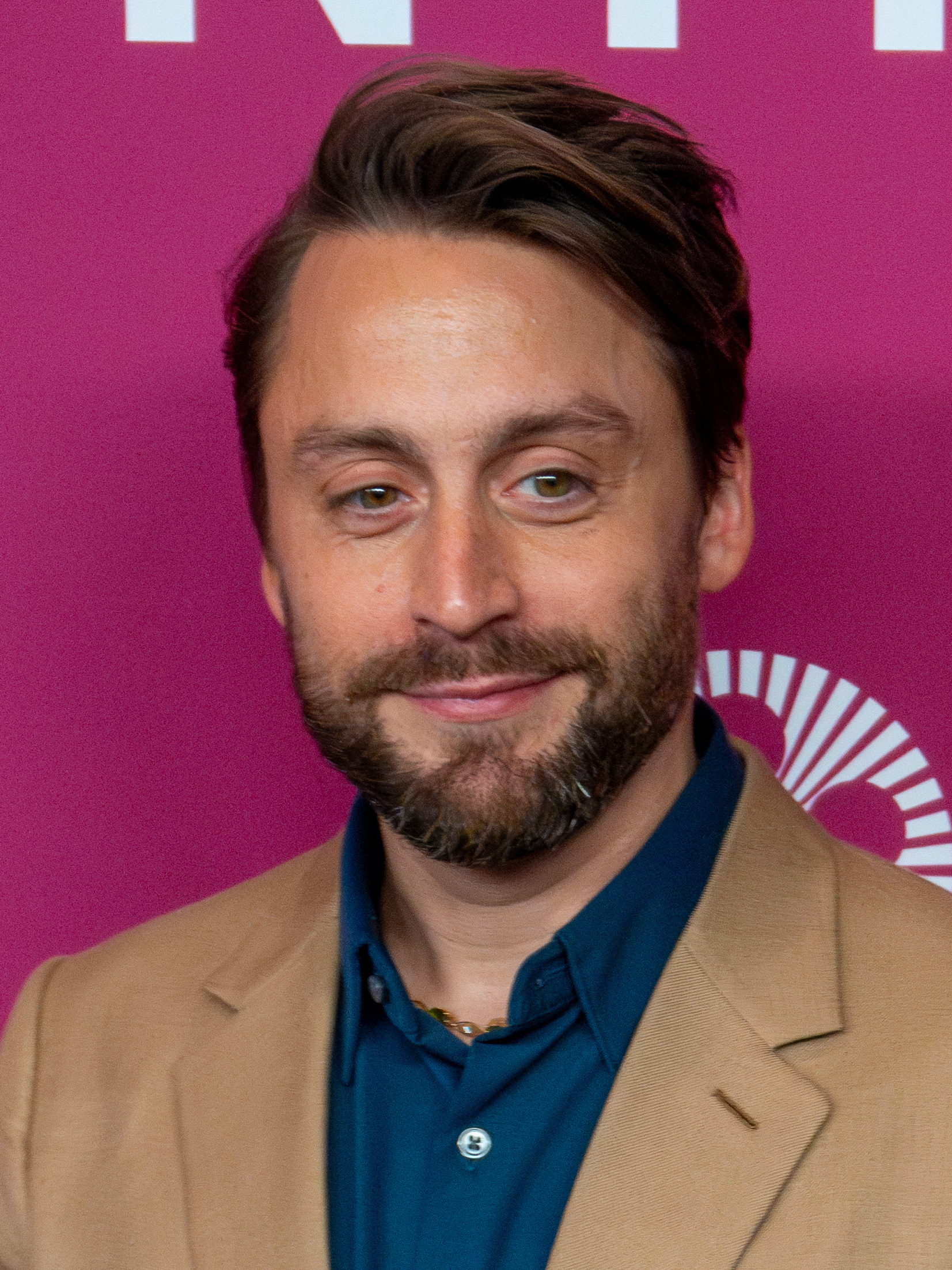
Kieran Culkin, Best Supporting Actor winner

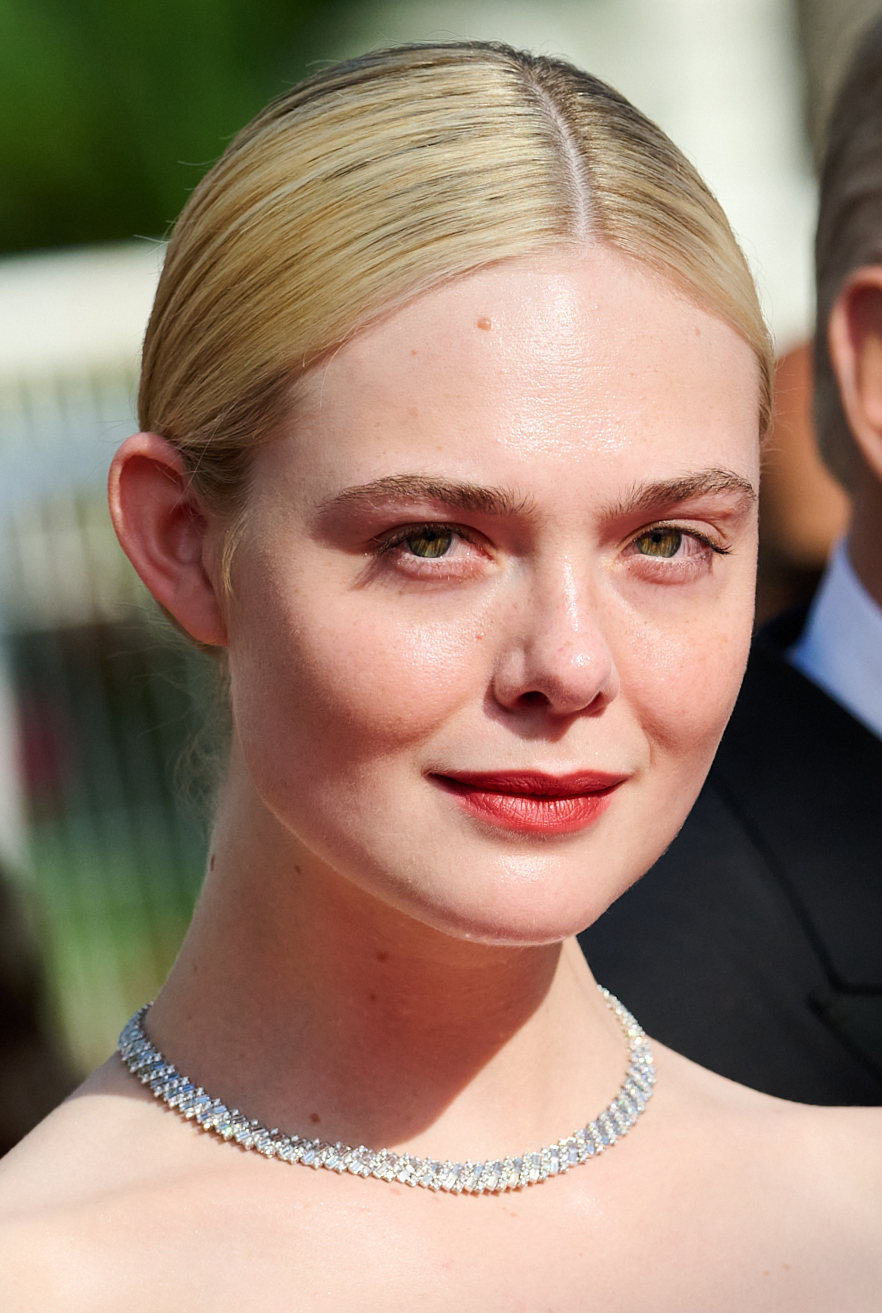
Elle Fanning, Best Supporting Actress winner

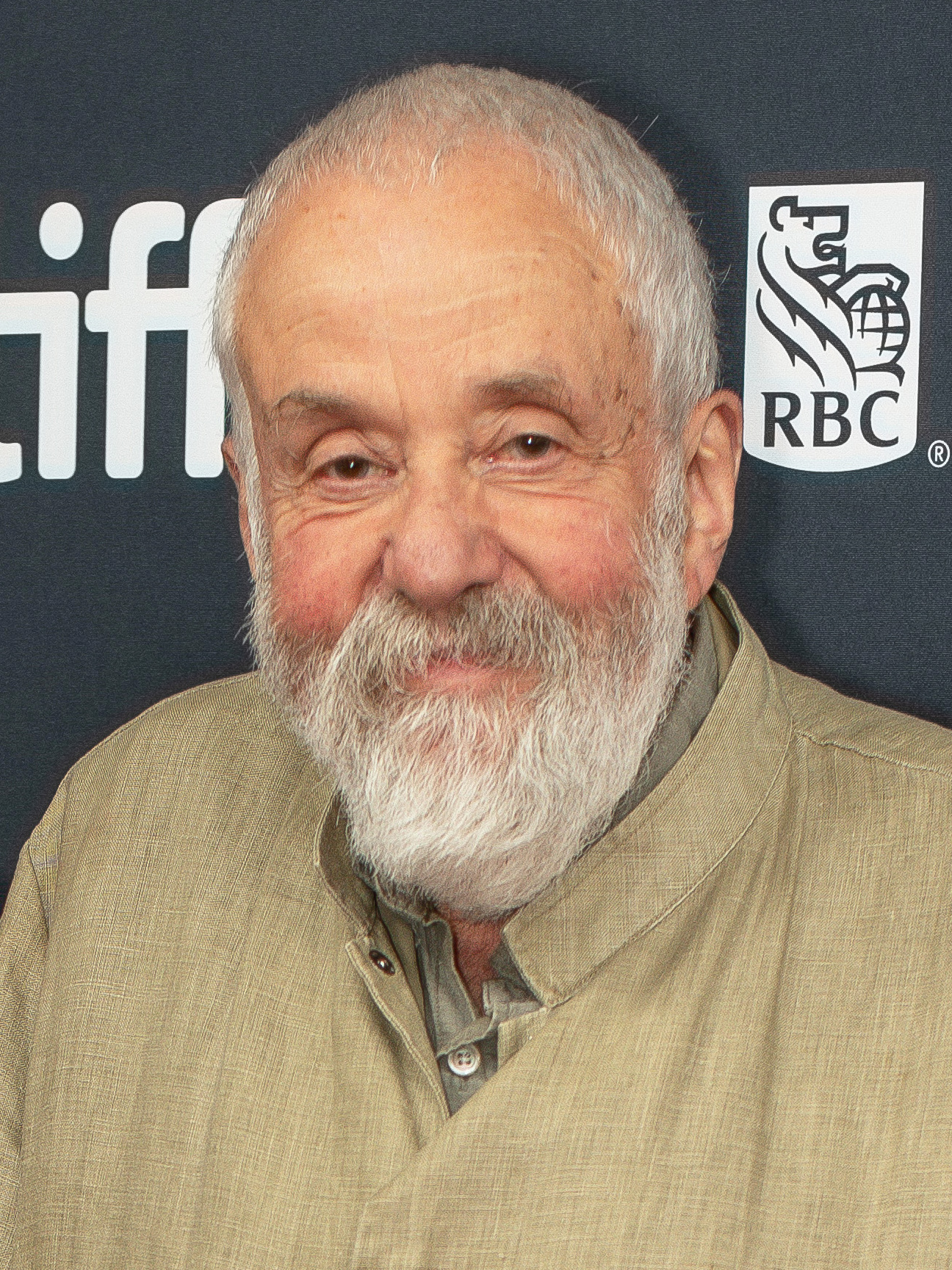
Mike Leigh, Best Original Screenplay winner

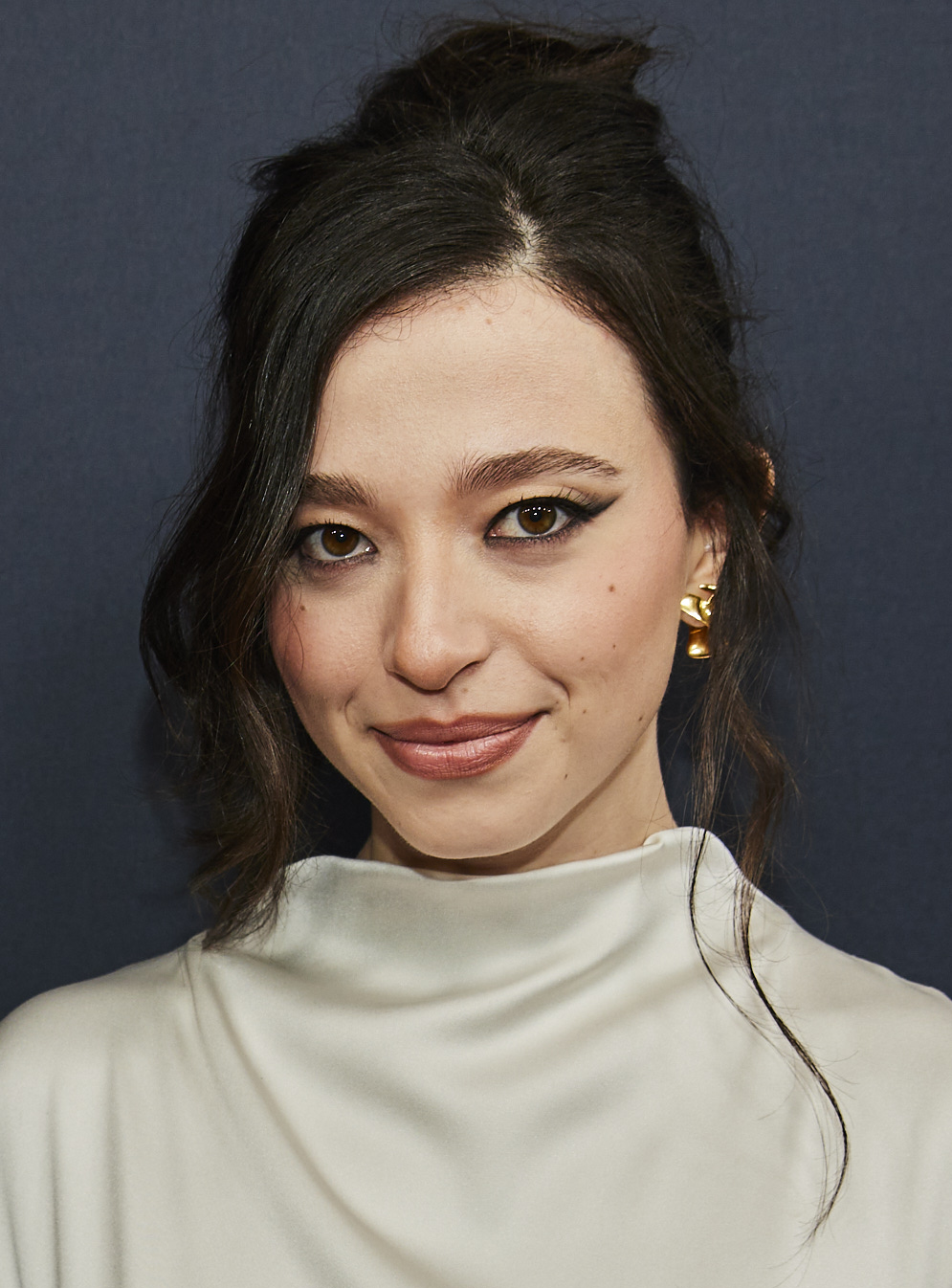
Mikey Madison, Breakthrough Performance winner

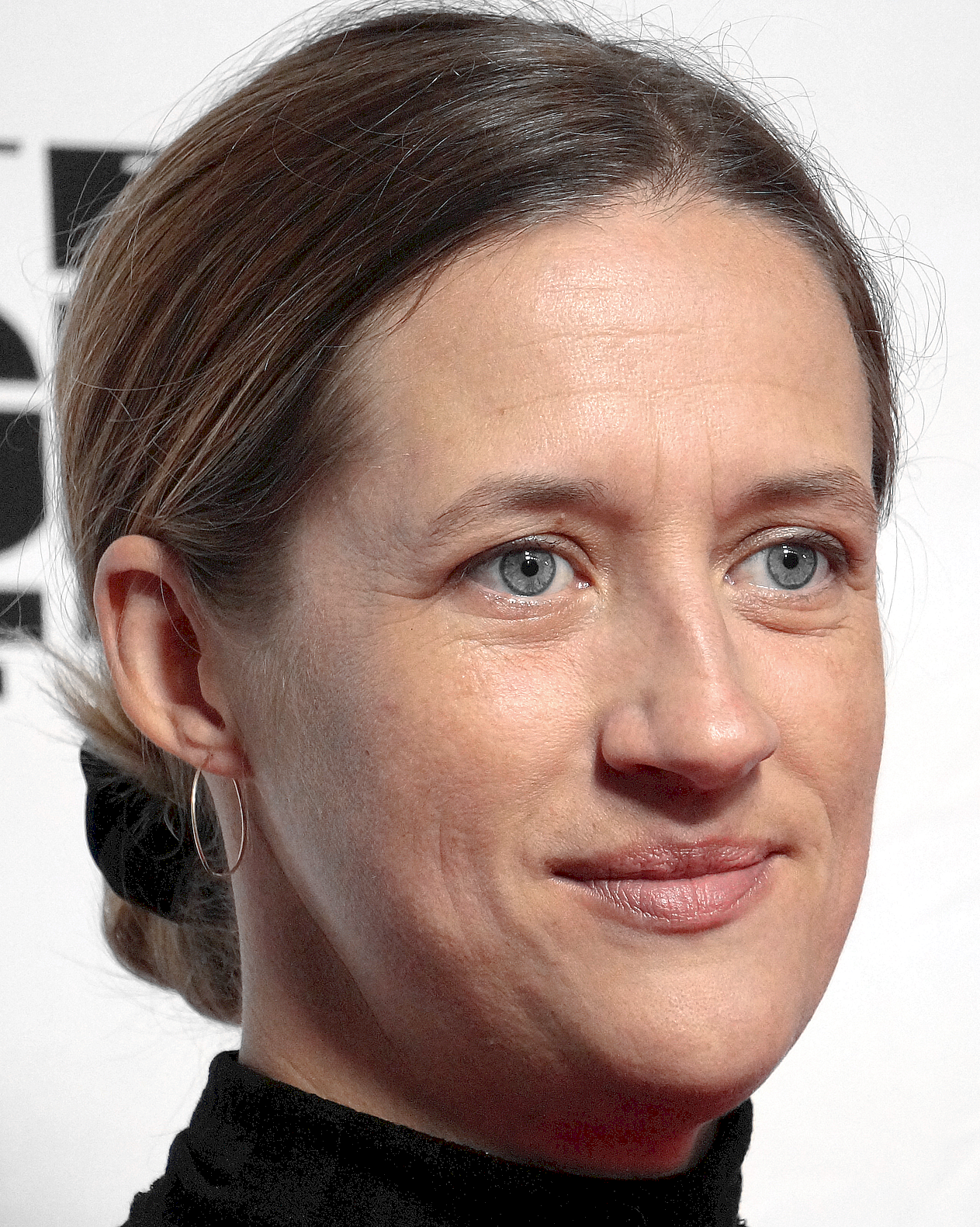
India Donaldson, Best Directorial Debut winner

== Top 10 Films ==
Films listed alphabetically except top, which is ranked as Best Film of the Year:

Wicked

- Anora
- Babygirl
- A Complete Unknown
- Conclave
- Furiosa: A Mad Max Saga
- Gladiator II
- Juror #2
- Queer
- A Real Pain
- Sing Sing

== Winners ==
Best Film:

- Wicked

Best Director:

- Jon M. Chu – Wicked

Best Actor:

- Daniel Craig – Queer

Best Actress:

- Nicole Kidman – Babygirl

Best Supporting Actor:

- Kieran Culkin – A Real Pain

Best Supporting Actress:

- Elle Fanning – A Complete Unknown

Best Original Screenplay:

- Mike Leigh – Hard Truths

Best Adapted Screenplay:

- Clint Bentley and Greg Kwedar – Sing Sing

Best Animated Feature:

- Flow

Breakthrough Performance:

- Mikey Madison – Anora

Best Directorial Debut:

- India Donaldson – Good One

Best International Film:

- The Seed of the Sacred Fig

Best Documentary:

- Sugarcane

Best Ensemble Cast:

- Conclave

Outstanding Achievement in Cinematography:

- Jarin Blaschke – Nosferatu

Outstanding Achievement in Stunt Artistry:

- Furiosa: A Mad Max Saga

NBR Spotlight Award:

- Creative collaboration of Cynthia Erivo and Ariana Grande – Wicked

NBR Freedom of Expression Award:

- No Other Land

== Top 5 International Films ==
The Seed of the Sacred Fig (Iran)

- All We Imagine as Light (India)
- The Girl with the Needle (Denmark)
- I'm Still Here (Brazil)
- Santosh (UK)
- Universal Language (Canada)

== Top 5 Documentaries ==
Sugarcane

- Black Box Diaries
- Dahomey
- Look into My Eyes
- Super/Man: The Christopher Reeve Story
- Will & Harper

== Top 10 Independent Films ==
- Bird
- A Different Man
- Dìdi
- Ghostlight
- Good One
- Hard Truths
- His Three Daughters
- Love Lies Bleeding
- My Old Ass
- Thelma
