= Solitude (film) =

2014 Swedish film

- Directed by: Beata Gårdeler
- Written by: Christian Augrell, Beata Gårdeler
- Produced by: Malin Idevall
- Starring: Anna Bjelkerud; Alexander Salzberger; Mats Blomgren; Erik Bolin
- Music by: Lisa Montan
- Release date: 2014
- Running time: 28 minutes
- Country: Sweden

Solitude (Svenska: Vännerna) is a 2014 Swedish drama film directed by Beata Gårdeler, who also co-wrote the screenplay with Christian Augrell. It stars Anna Bjelkerud.

== Plot ==
Karen, 55, lies dead in her place after some months of missing. While two investigators, Annika and Samir finds any of her relatives, the film follows the journey of Karen's corpse from police officers and social workers, to the resting place.

== Cast ==
- Anna Bjelkerud – Annika / Moa
- Alexander Salzberger – Samir
- Mats Blomgren – Manfred
- Robin Keller – Conny
- Eva Melander – Ewa

== Background ==
Solitude was produced by Malin Idevall for Bob Film Sweden AB with Sveriges Television AB as co-producer and with production support from the Swedish Film Institute. The film was photographed by Gösta Reiland and edited by Linda Jilmalm. The music was composed by Lisa Montan.

The film premiered on January 25, 2014 at the Gothenburg Film Festival and was shown the same day on SVT1.

== Reception ==
The film was awarded the Stora novellfilmspriset in 2014.
