= Porcelain War =

2024 documentary film about the war in Ukraine

- Official poster
- Directed by: Brendan Bellomo; Slava Leontyev
- Written by: Brendan Bellomo; Aniela Sidorska; Paula DuPré Pesmen; Slava Leontyev
- Produced by: Aniela Sidorska; Paula DuPré Pesmen; Camilla Mazzaferro; Olivia Ahnemann
- Cinematography: Andrey Stefanov
- Edited by: Brendan Bellomo; Aniela Sidorska; Kelly Cameron
- Music by: DakhaBrakha
- Animation by: BluBlu Studios
- Production companies: Finch No Worries; Imaginary Lane
- Distributed by: Picturehouse
- Release dates: January 20, 2024 (Sundance); November 22, 2024 (United States)
- Running time: 87 minutes
- Countries: United States; Australia; Ukraine
- Languages: Ukrainian; English; Russian
- Box office: $25,213

Porcelain War (Ukrainian: «Порцелянова війна», romanized: Portselianova viyna) is a 2024 documentary film directed by Brendan Bellomo and Slava Leontyev. It won the 2024 Sundance Festival Grand Jury Prize and follows the experience of Ukrainian artists as they face the current Russian occupation in Ukraine.

The documentary had its world premiere at the 2024 Sundance Film Festival, where it won the U.S. Documentary Competition Grand Jury Prize. At the 97th Academy Awards it was nominated for Best Documentary Feature Film.

== Premise ==
Porcelain War follows Slava Leontyev, Anya Stasenko, and Andrey Stefanov during the war in Ukraine. All of them join the Ukrainian defense, and Slava works as a machine gun trainer. Even as the war goes on, Slava and Anya create porcelain figurines in resistance to the war. The film emphasizes the purpose of art during conflict as well as national pride. The soundtrack for the movie features music by Ukrainian Folk/ethno-chaos band DakhaBrakha who gave their entire discography for the film with a scene of their live performance during the credits.

The footage in Porcelain War includes Ukrainian landscape as well as the wreckage caused by war missiles.

== Production ==
War footage for Porcelain War was captured by GoPro action cameras and aerial drones. The film also features hand-drawn and CGI-animated scenes produced by the Polish company BluBlu Studios.

== Release ==
The film won the Grand Jury Prize for the U.S. documentary category in the 2024 Sundance Film Festival. Bellomo, who created the film along with Leontyev, explained that the film received an award "because of the bravery of the people of Ukraine". The film was also sponsored by the Utah Film Center. In August 2024, Picturehouse acquired distribution rights to the film. The film was also screened at the Embassy of the Czech Republic in Beijing in March 2026 as part of a cultural initiative supporting Ukraine.

== Reception ==
=== Critical response ===
The film received widespread critical acclaim. It holds a 95% rating on Rotten Tomatoes based on 43 reviews, with the website's critics consensus reading, "Porcelain War presents harrowing footage from the frontlines of a terrible conflict while treasuring the creativity that flourishes in spite of the chaos, yielding a profound humanistic statement on resilience." Writing for the Los Angeles Times, critic Robert Abele described Porcelain War as "a sublime and stirring documentary." The film received positive reviews from critics. Writing for The Washington Post, Ty Burr described it as a powerful documentary that highlights the resilience of artists amid the war in Ukraine.

It has been nominated for Best Documentary Feature at the 97th Academy Awards.

=== Accolades ===
Award	Date	Category	Recipient	Result	Ref.
Sundance Film Festival	28 January 2024	U.S. Documentary Grand Jury Prize	Porcelain War	Won	
Sarasota Film Festival	14 April 2024	Special Jury Mention	Porcelain War	Won	
San Francisco International Film Festival	28 April 2024	Best Documentary Feature	Porcelain War	Nominated	
Seattle International Film Festival	27 May 2024	Best Documentary	Porcelain War	Won	
Cinéfest Sudbury International Film Festival	22 September 2024	Audience Choice: Documentary	Porcelain War	Won	
Critics' Choice Documentary Awards	10 November 2024	Best New Documentary Filmmaker(s)	Brendan Bellomo & Slava Leontyev	Nominated	
Critics' Choice Documentary Awards	10 November 2024	Best Political Documentary	Porcelain War	Nominated	
Cinema Eye Honors	9 January 2024	Audience Choice Prize	Porcelain War	Won	
Cinema Eye Honors	9 January 2024	Outstanding Production	Paula DuPre' Pesmen, Aniela Sidorska, Camilla Mazzaferro and Olivia Ahnemann	Nominated	
Cinema Eye Honors	9 January 2024	Outstanding Cinematography	Andrey Stefanov	Nominated	
Cinema Eye Honors	9 January 2024	Outstanding Visual Design	Brendan Bellomo and BluBlu Studios	Nominated	
Satellite Awards	26 January 2025	Best Motion Picture – Documentary	Porcelain War	Nominated	
AACTA Awards	7 February 2025	Best Documentary	Brendan Bellomo, Slava Leontyev, Camilla Mazzaferro, Aniela Sidorska, Paula Du Pré Pesmen, Olivia Ahnemann	Nominated	
Directors Guild of America Awards	8 February 2025	Outstanding Directorial Achievement in Documentaries	Brendan Bellomo and Slava Leontyev	Won	
Producers Guild of America Awards	8 February 2025	Outstanding Producer of Documentary Theatrical Motion Pictures	Aniela Sidorska and Paula DuPré Pesmen	Nominated	
Academy Awards	2 March 2025	Best Documentary Feature Film	Brendan Bellomo, Slava Leontyev, Aniela Sidorska, and Paula DuPré Pesmen	Nominated	
