= Slava Leontyev =

Ukrainian soldier and film director

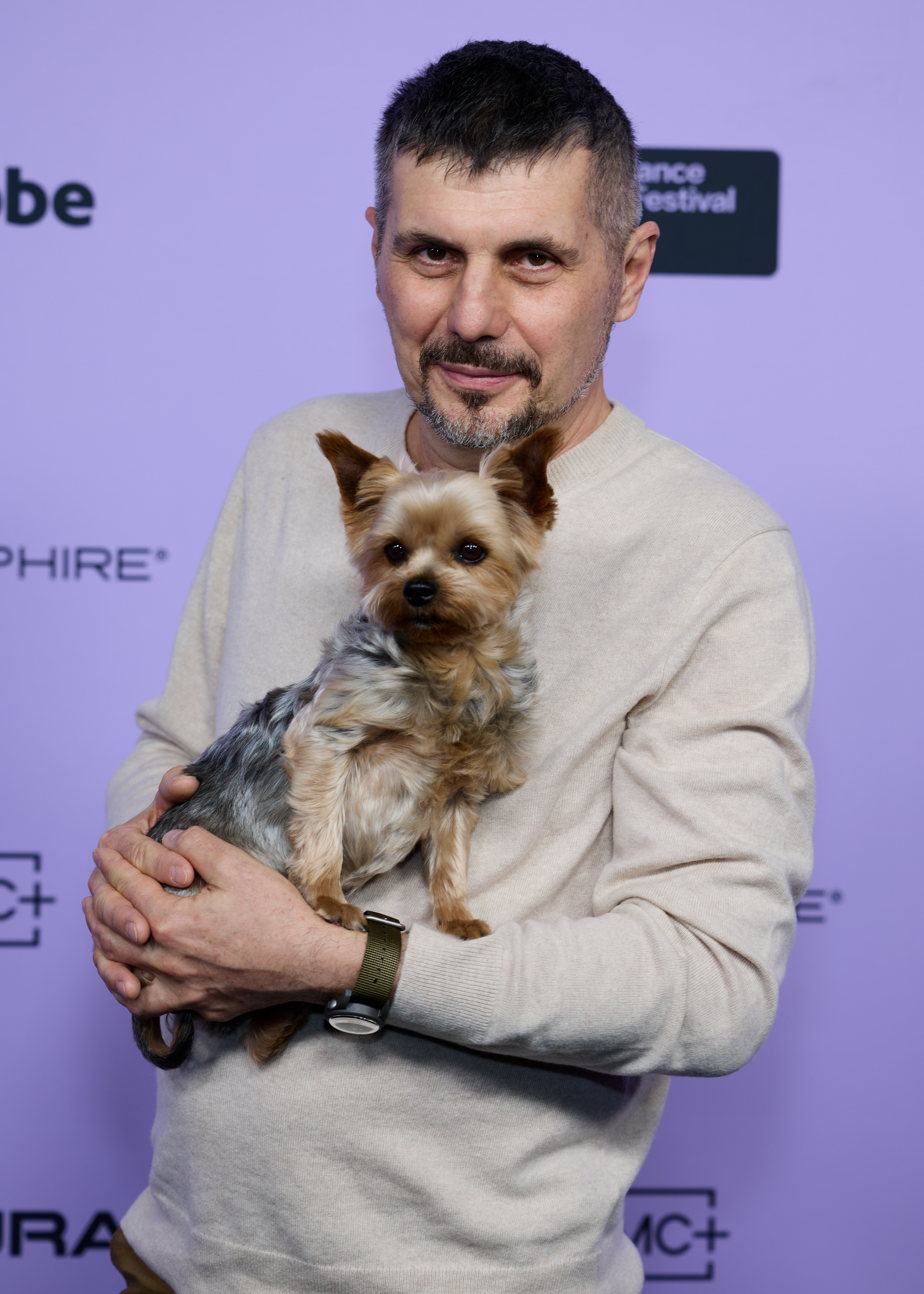
- Slava Leontyev and Frodo at the premiere of the movie Porcelain War during the 2024 Sundance Film Festival

Slava Leontyev is a Ukrainian artist, former soldier, and co-director of Porcelain War, winner of the 2024 Sundance Film Festival Grand Jury Prize: U.S. Documentary.

== Work ==
Porcelain War premiered at the 2024 Sundance Film Festival, where it won the Grand Jury Prize in the U.S. Documentary Competition.
