= Sugarcane (film) =

2024 documentary film by Julian Brave NoiseCat and Emily Kassie

- Theatrical release poster
- Directed by: Julian Brave NoiseCat; Emily Kassie
- Produced by: Emily Kassie; Kellen Quinn
- Cinematography: Christopher LaMarca; Emily Kassie
- Edited by: Nathan Punwar; Maya Daisy Hawke
- Music by: Mali Obomsawin
- Production companies: Impact Partners; Fit Via Vi; Kassie Films; Hedgehog Films
- Distributed by: National Geographic Documentary Films (Worldwide); Variance Films (United States); Films We Like (Canada)
- Release dates: January 20, 2024 (Sundance); August 9, 2024 (United States and Canada)
- Running time: 107 minutes
- Countries: United States; Canada
- Languages: English; Secwepemctsín
- Box office: $134,257

Sugarcane is a 2024 documentary film, directed by Julian Brave NoiseCat and Emily Kassie and produced by Emily Kassie and Kellen Quinn. It follows an investigation into the Canadian Indian residential school system, igniting a reckoning in the lives of survivors and descendants.

It had its world premiere at the Sundance Film Festival on January 20, 2024 where it won the Grand Jury award for Directing. It was theatrically released in limited engagements in the United States and Canada on August 9, 2024, before gradually expanding to other cities starting August 16, by National Geographic Documentary Films through Variance Films in the United States and Films We Like in Canada. It received critical acclaim and won the award for Best Documentary at the National Board of Review. At the 97th Academy Awards, it was nominated for the Best Documentary Feature Film award.

== Premise ==
Sugarcane follows an investigation into Saint Joseph's Indian Residential School, an Indian residential school located near Williams Lake, British Columbia, igniting a reckoning in the lives of survivors and descendants.

== Production ==
The film received grants from Catapult Film Fund and the International Documentary Association Enterprise Fund. Lily Gladstone boarded the project as an executive producer.

== Release ==
It had its world premiere at the Sundance Film Festival on January 20, 2024. It also played at the 2024 San Francisco International Film Festival, 2024 Seattle International Film Festival, the 2024 Sheffield International Documentary Festival, the 2024 Sydney Film Festival, the 2024 DOXA Documentary Film Festival, the 2024 Nantucket Film Festival, the 2024 Boston Independent Film Festival, the 2024 Sarasota Film Festival, the 2024 Maryland Film Festival, the 2024 Cleveland International Film Festival, and the Full Frame Documentary Film Festival.

In February 2024, National Geographic Documentary Films acquired distribution rights to the film. It was later announced that the film would be screened in exclusive engagements at the Film Forum in Manhattan and TIFF Lightbox in Toronto starting August 9, 2024, followed by the Laemmle Royal in Los Angeles starting August 16; an expansion to other cities in the United States and Canada will gradually take place starting August 16. Variance Films and Films We Like serve as co-distributors in the United States and Canada respectively.

== Reception ==
On the review aggregator website Rotten Tomatoes, 100% of 65 critics' reviews are positive, with an average rating of 8.9/10. The website's consensus reads: "Accumulating immense emotional power as it methodically uncovers a grave injustice, Sugarcane is one of the most compelling and important documentaries of the year." Metacritic, which uses a weighted average, assigned the film a score of 90 out of 100, based on 17 critics, indicating "universal acclaim".

=== Accolades ===
Award	Date	Category	Recipient	Result	Ref.
Sundance Film Festival	January 28, 2024	Grand Jury Prize U.S. Documentary	Sugarcane	Nominated	
Sundance Film Festival	January 28, 2024	U.S. Documentary – Directing Award	Julian Brave NoiseCat & Emily Kassie	Won	
Sarasota Film Festival	April 14, 2024	Best Documentary Feature	Sugarcane	Won	
San Francisco International Film Festival	April 28, 2024	Best Documentary Feature	Sugarcane	Won	
Seattle International Film Festival	May 19, 2024	Best Feature Film	Sugarcane	Nominated	
Seattle International Film Festival	May 19, 2024	Grand Jury Prize – Special Mention	Sugarcane	Won	
Critics' Choice Documentary Awards	November 10, 2024	Best Documentary Feature	Sugarcane	Nominated	
Critics' Choice Documentary Awards	November 10, 2024	Best True Crime Documentary	Sugarcane	Won	
Critics' Choice Documentary Awards	November 10, 2024	Best Political Documentary	Sugarcane	Won	
Critics' Choice Documentary Awards	November 10, 2024	Best Historical Documentary	Sugarcane	Nominated	
Critics' Choice Documentary Awards	November 10, 2024	Best Director	Julian Brave NoiseCat & Emily Kassie	Nominated	
Critics' Choice Documentary Awards	November 10, 2024	Best New Documentary Filmmaker(s)	Julian Brave NoiseCat & Emily Kassie	Nominated	
Critics' Choice Documentary Awards	November 10, 2024	Best Cinematography	Christopher LaMarca & Emily Kassie	Nominated	
Critics' Choice Documentary Awards	November 10, 2024	Best Editing	Nathan Punwar & Maya Daisy Hawke	Nominated	
Gotham Awards	December 2, 2024	Best Documentary Feature	Julian Brave NoiseCat, Emily Kassie, Kellen Quinn	Nominated	
National Board of Review	December 4, 2024	Best Documentary Film	Sugarcane	Won	
International Documentary Association Awards	December 5, 2024	Best Feature Documentary	Julian Brave NoiseCat, Emily Kassie, Kellen Quinn	Nominated	
International Documentary Association Awards	December 5, 2024	Best Director	Julian Brave NoiseCat, Emily Kassie	Nominated	
International Documentary Association Awards	December 5, 2024	Best Cinematography	Christopher LaMarca, Emily Kassie	Nominated	
International Documentary Association Awards	December 5, 2024	Best Editing	Nathan Punwar, Maya Daisy Hawke	Nominated	
International Documentary Association Awards	December 5, 2024	Best Original Music Score	Mali Obomsawin	Nominated	
San Diego Film Critics Society	December 9, 2024	Best Documentary Film	Sugarcane	Nominated	
Chicago Film Critics Association	December 12, 2024	Best Documentary Film	Sugarcane	Nominated	
St. Louis Film Critics Association	December 15, 2024	Best Documentary Feature	Sugarcane	Nominated	
San Francisco Bay Area Film Critics Circle	December 15, 2024	Best Documentary Feature	Sugarcane	Won	
Seattle Film Critics Society	December 16, 2024	Best Documentary Film	Sugarcane	Nominated	
Dallas–Fort Worth Film Critics Association	December 18, 2024	Best Documentary Film	Sugarcane	Won	
Alliance of Women Film Journalists	January 7, 2025	Best Documentary Film	Sugarcane	Nominated	
Cinema Eye Honors	January 9, 2024	Outstanding Non-Fiction Feature	Julian Brave NoiseCat, Emily Kassie, Kellen Quinn, Christopher LaMarca, Nathan Punwar, Maya Daisy Hawke, Mali Obomsawin, Martin Czembor, Andrea Bella, Michael Feuser and Ed Archie Noisecat	Nominated	
Cinema Eye Honors	January 9, 2024	Outstanding Direction	Julian Brave NoiseCat and Emily Kassie	Nominated	
Cinema Eye Honors	January 9, 2024	Outstanding Production	Emily Kassie and Kellen Quinn	Nominated	
Cinema Eye Honors	January 9, 2024	Outstanding Cinematography	Emily Kassie and Christopher LaMarca	Won	
Cinema Eye Honors	January 9, 2024	Outstanding Original Score	Mali Obomsawin	Nominated	
Cinema Eye Honors	January 9, 2024	Audience Choice Prize	Sugarcane	Nominated	
Satellite Awards	January 26, 2025	Best Motion Picture – Documentary	Sugarcane	Nominated	
Directors Guild of America Awards	February 8, 2025	Outstanding Directorial Achievement in Documentaries	Julian Brave NoiseCat and Emily Kassie	Nominated	
Independent Spirit Awards	February 22, 2025	Truer Than Fiction Award	Julian Brave NoiseCat and Emily Kassie	Nominated	
Academy Awards	March 2, 2025	Best Documentary Feature Film	Sugarcane	Nominated	
Golden Trailer Awards	May 29, 2025	Best Documentary TV Spot (for a Feature Film)	National Geographic / Silk Factory/Silk Factory GFX	Nominated	
