= 19th Cinema Eye Honors =

- Date: January 8, 2026
- Location: New York Academy of Medicine, East Harlem, New York
- Most wins: Come See Me in the Good Light (3)
- Most nominations: Film: Come See Me in the Good Light (6); Broadcast: Social Studies (3)
- Website: cinemaeyehonors.com

The 19th Cinema Eye Honors, destined to recognize outstanding artistry and craft in nonfiction filmmaking of 2025, took place at the New York Academy of Medicine in East Harlem, New York on January 8, 2026.

The broadcast categories as well as the Short Films shortlist, the Audience Choice Prize longlist and the recipients for The Unforgettables, were announced on October 23, 2025. FX on Hulu series Social Studies, which follows a group of follows teenagers over the course of a school year in Los Angeles, led the nominations with three.

As per usual, the nominations for the film categories were announced later, on November 13, 2025. Come See Me in the Good Light, which follows poet and activist Andrea Gibson, led the nominations with six. 2000 Meters to Andriivka, Cover-Up and Seeds follow with five nods each. Nominees for the Heterodox Award as well as the recipients for the Legacy Award were announced in December 15.

Four films were announced as recipients for the Legacy Award: Portrait of Jason by Shirley Clarke, which covers the life of nightclub performer Jason Holliday; Burden of Dreams by Les Blank, which chronicles the turbulent production of Werner Herzog's film Fitzcarraldo; Sans Soleil by Chris Marker, a meditational film on human memory; and Tongues Untied by Marlon T. Riggs, which explores the Black gay identity. Additionally, the Cinema Eye-Con Award for Career Achievement was introduced, with Danish editor Janus Billeskov Jansen being the inaugural recipient.

== Winners and nominees ==
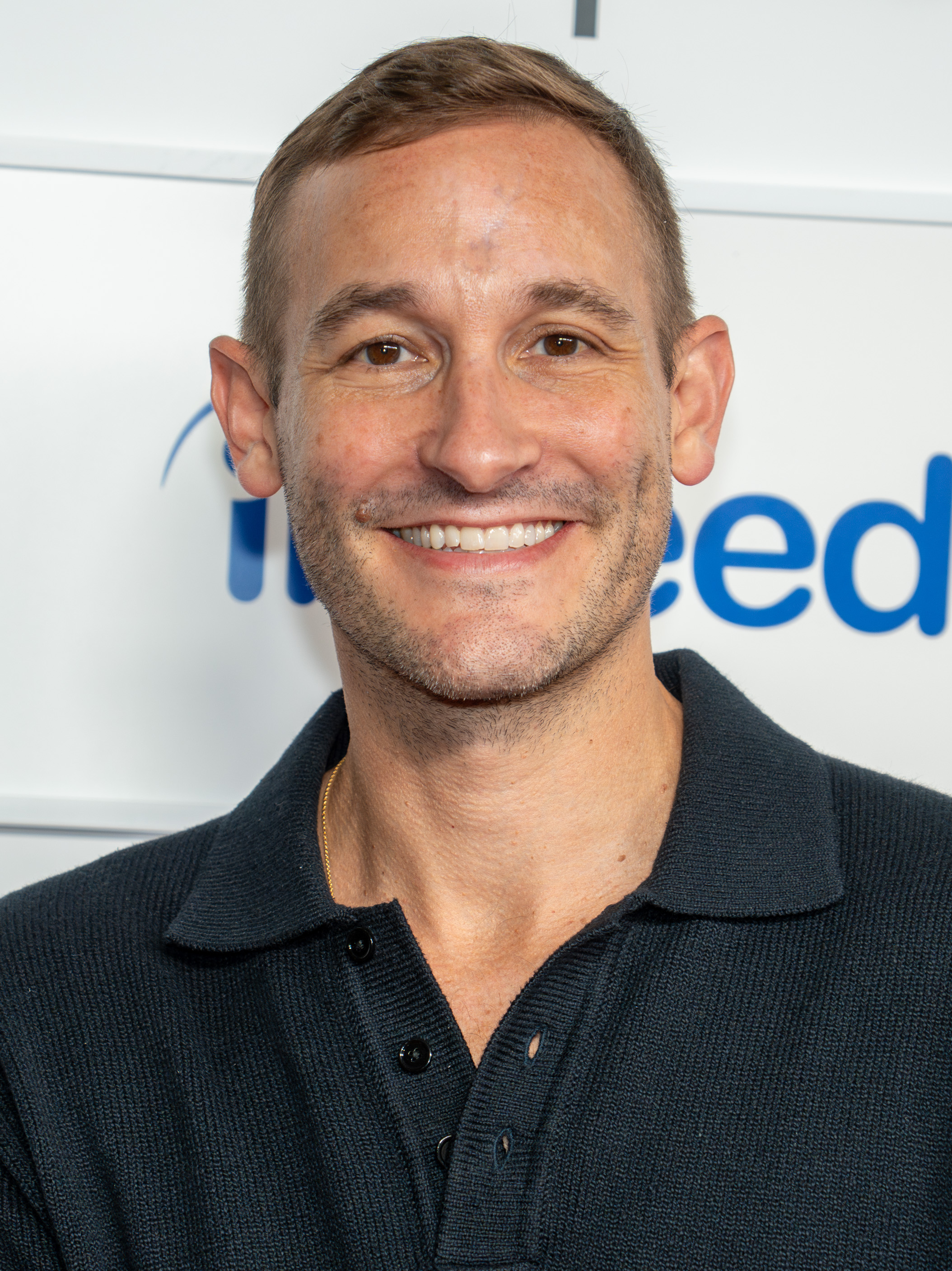
Ryan White, Outstanding Non-Fiction Feature winner

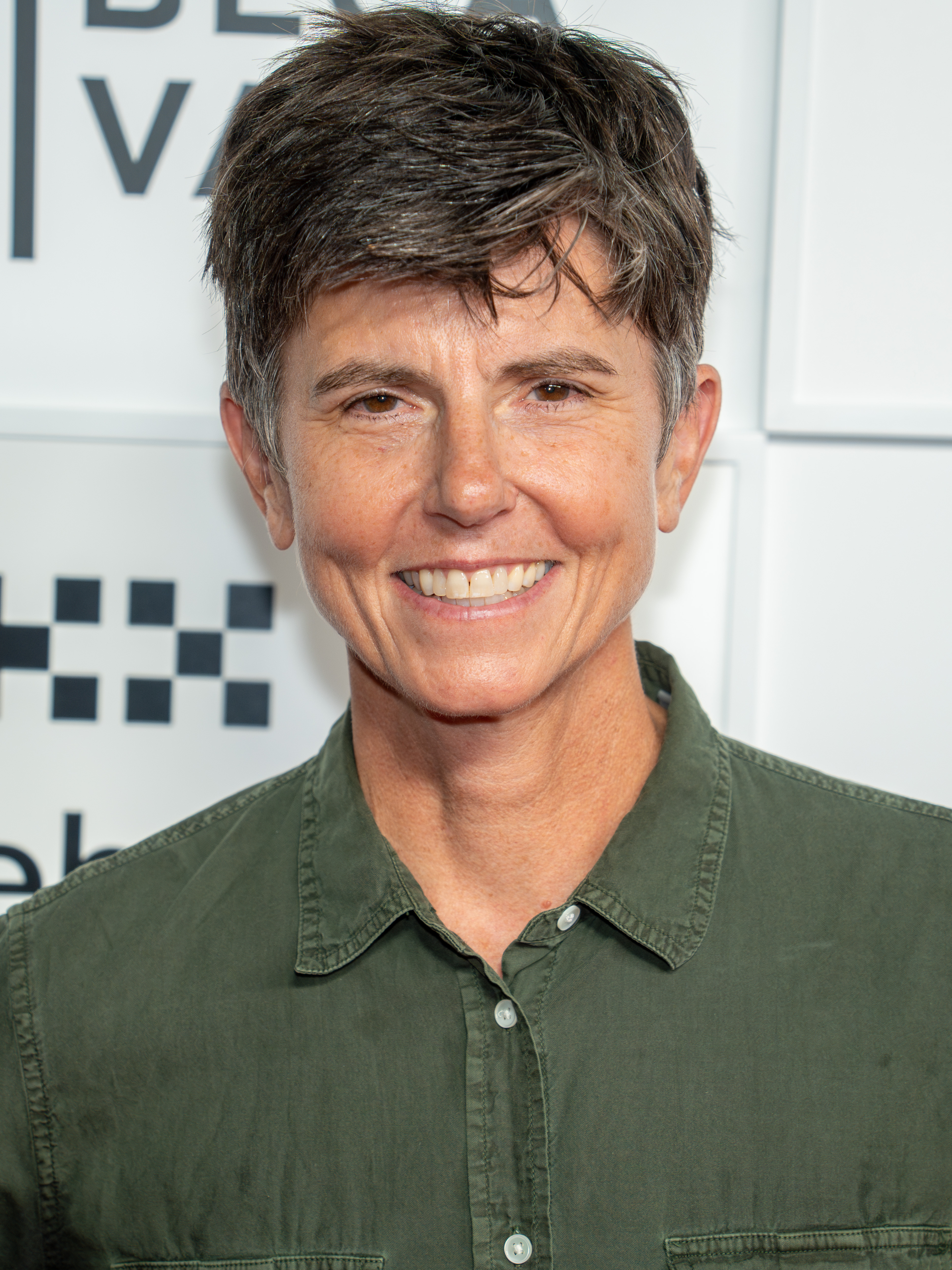
Tig Notaro, Outstanding Non-Fiction Feature winner

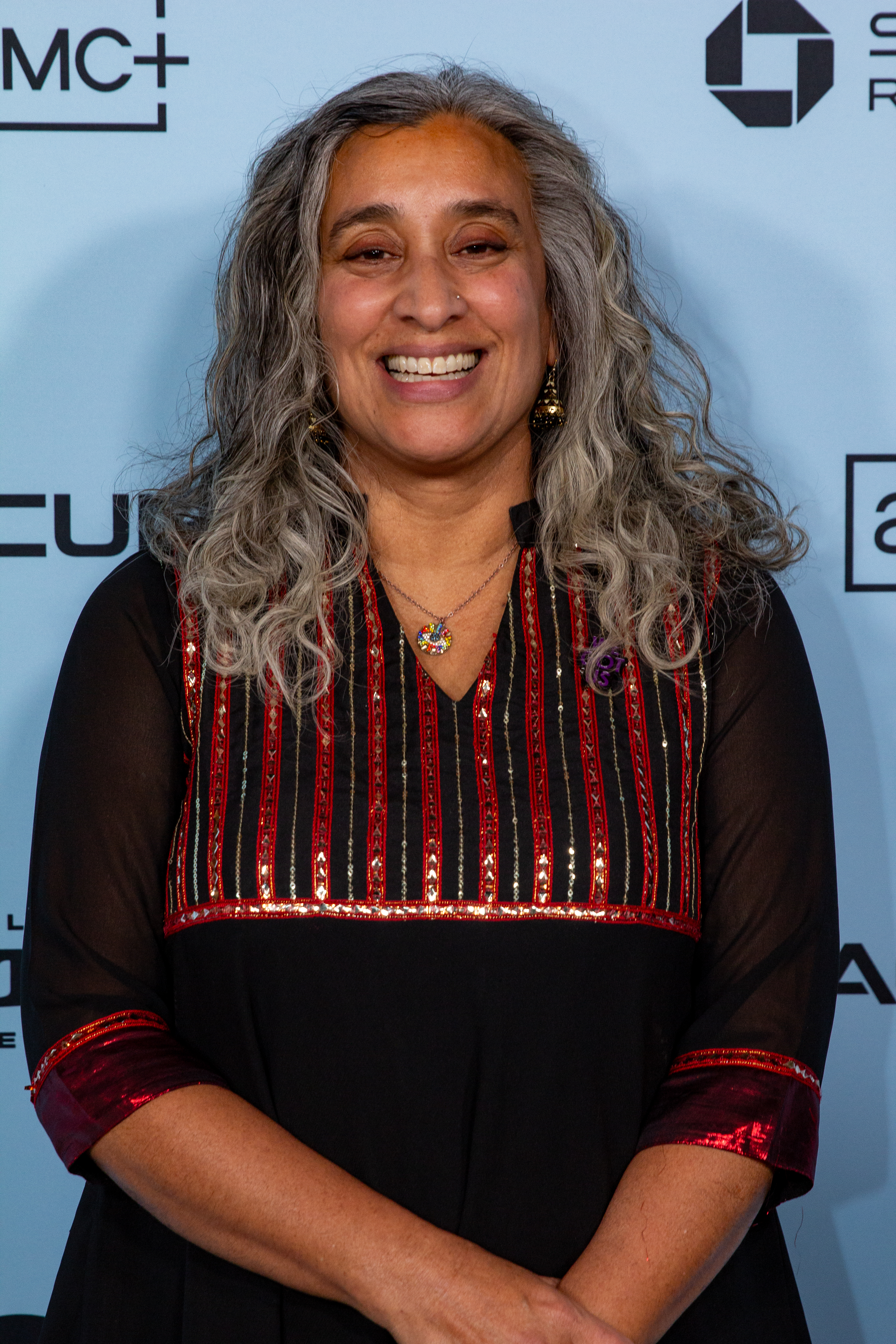
Geeta Gandbhir, Outstanding Direction winner

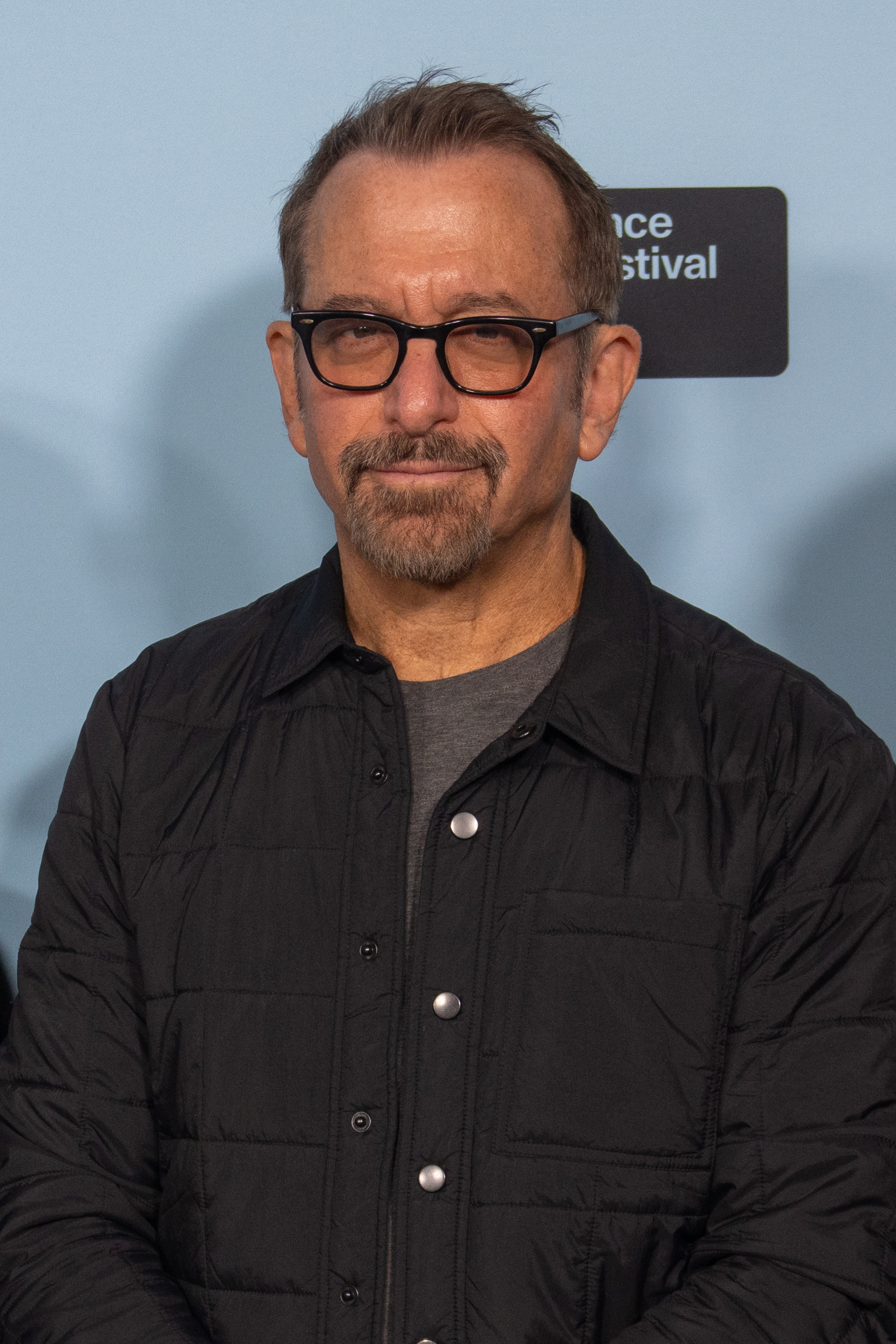
Andrew Jarecki, Outstanding Production winner

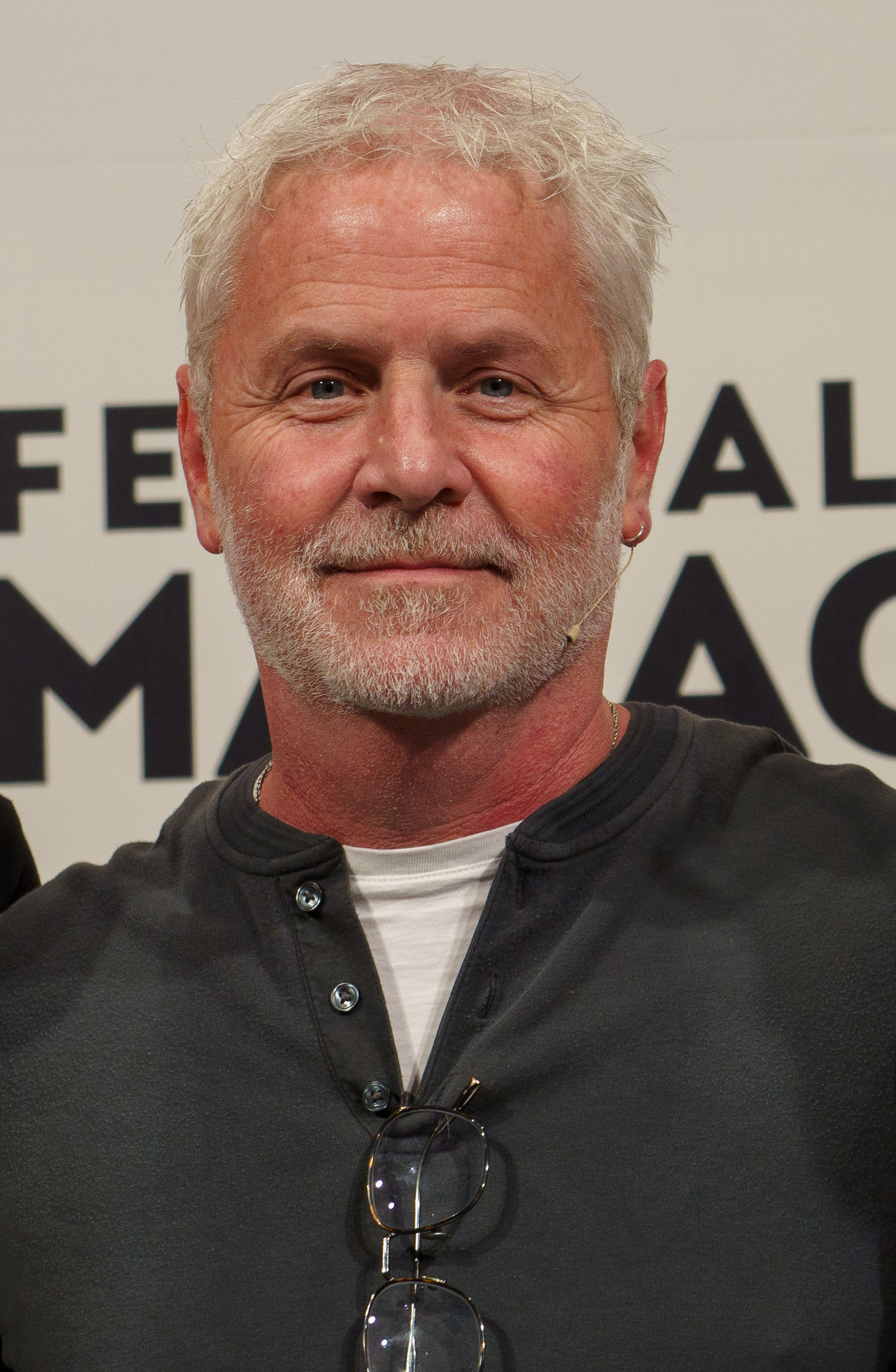
Blake Neely, Outstanding Original Music Score winner

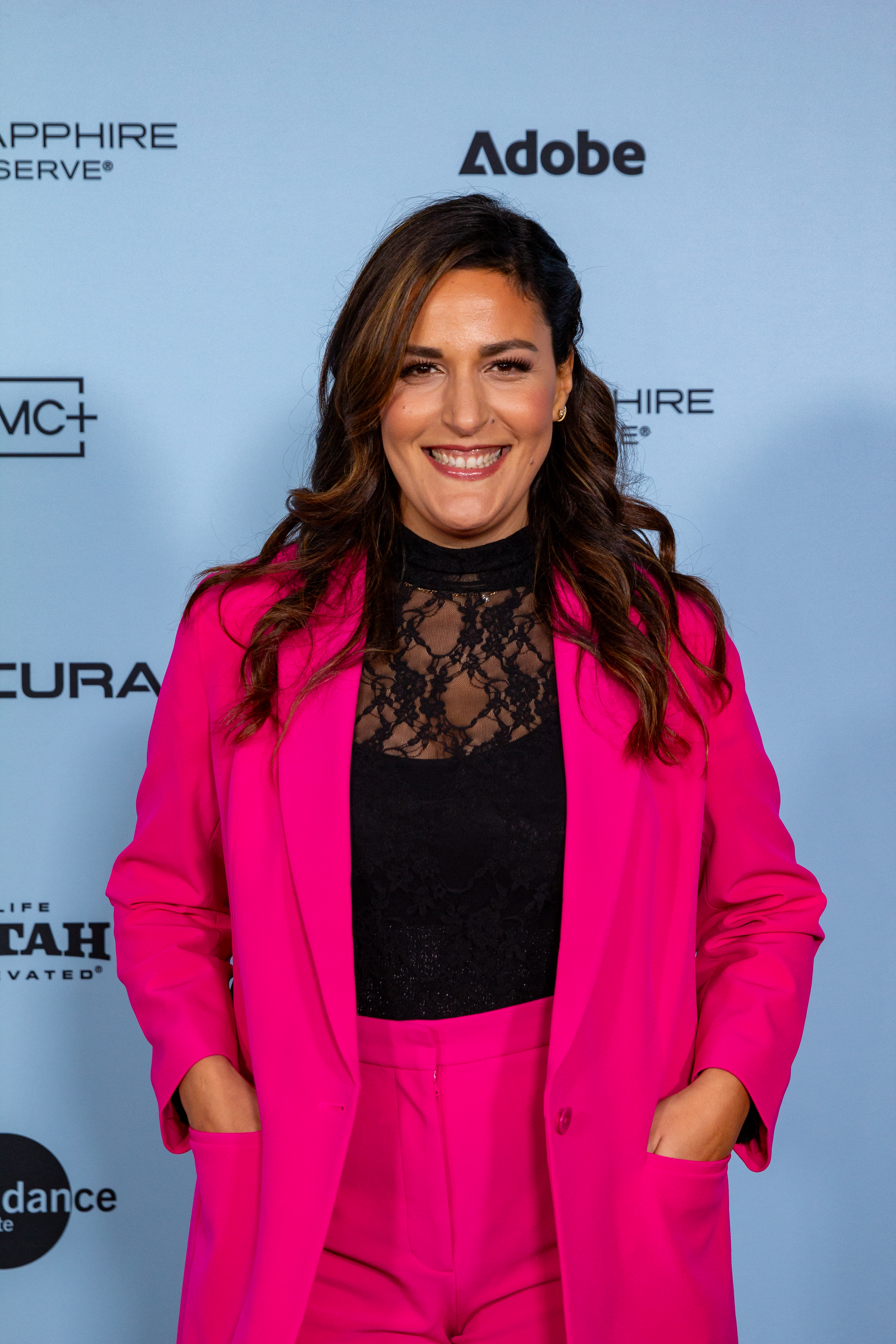
Noam Shuster-Eliassi, The Unforgettables honoree

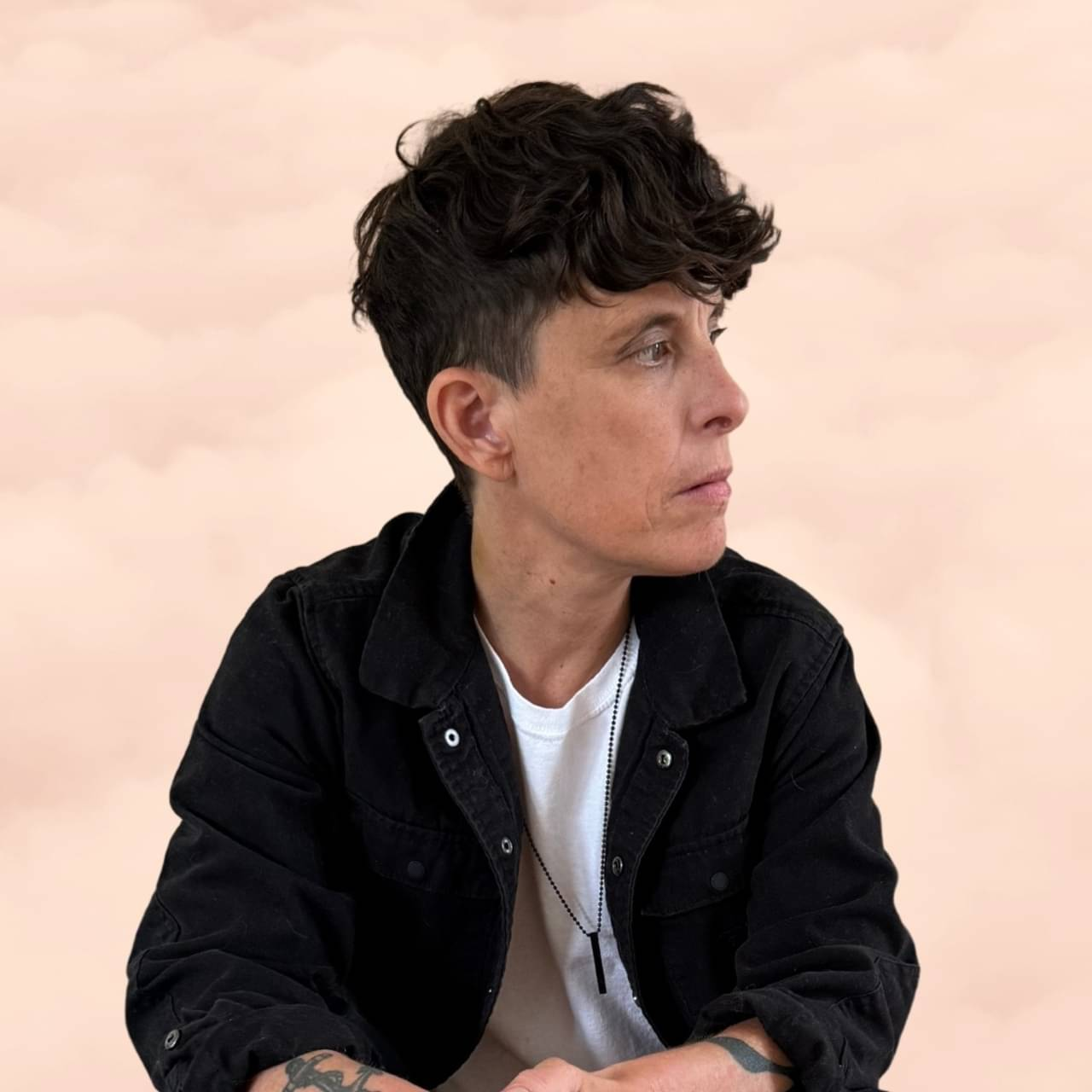
Andrea Gibson, The Unforgettables honoree

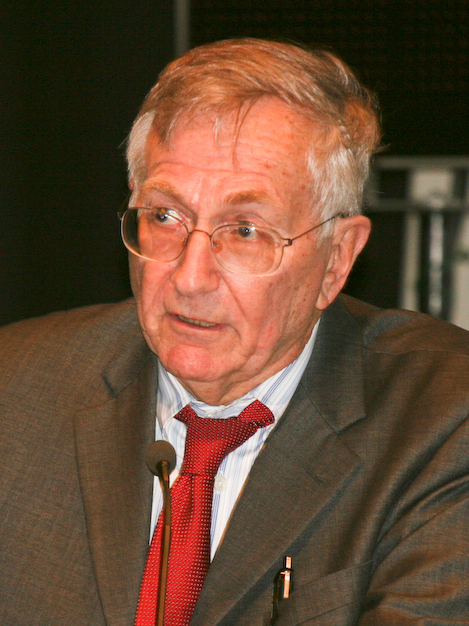
Seymour Hersh, The Unforgettables honoree

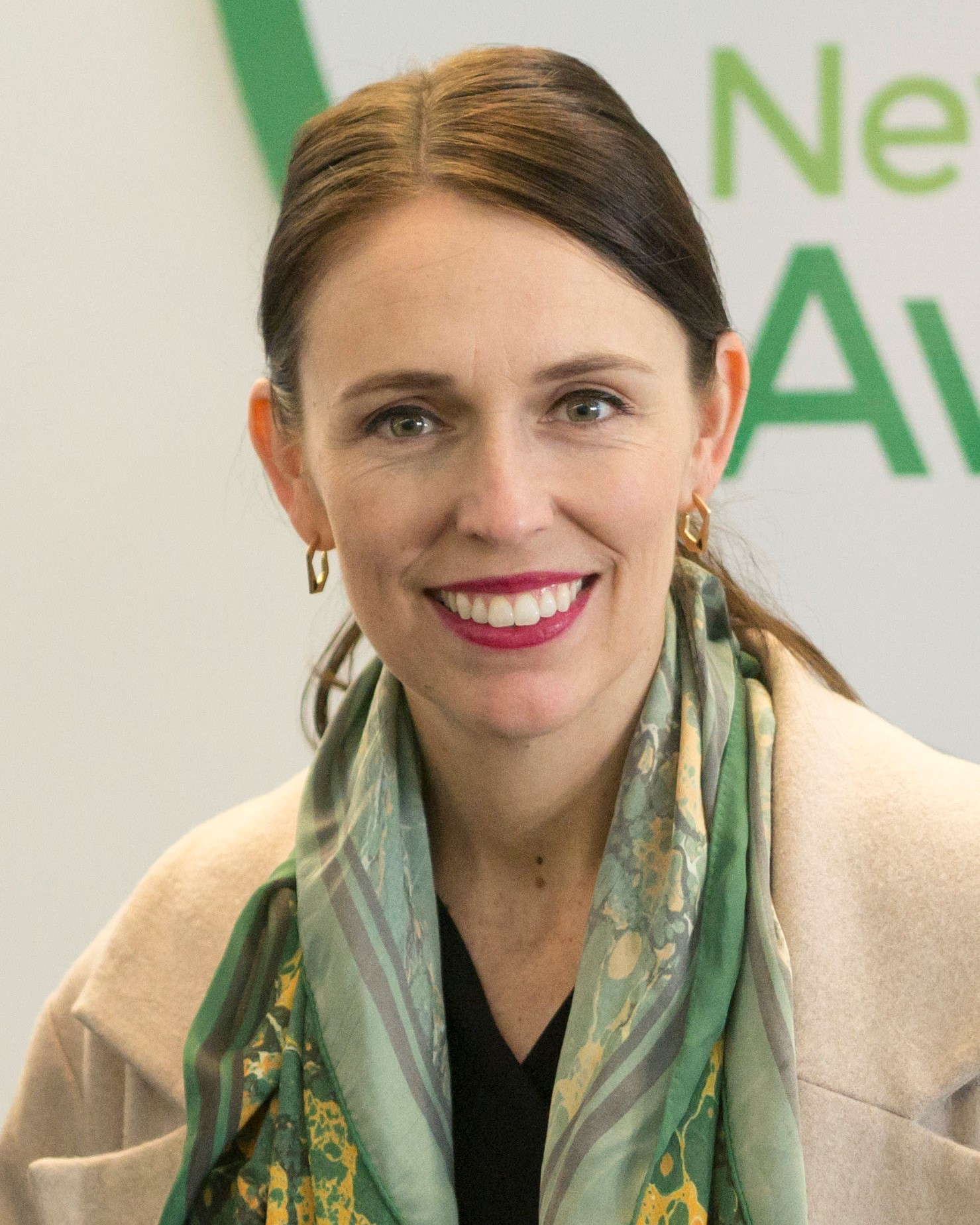
Jacinda Ardern, The Unforgettables honoree

The winners are listed first and in bold.

=== Feature Films ===
Outstanding Non-Fiction Feature
**Come See Me in the Good Light – Ryan White, Jessica Hargrave, Tig Notaro, Stef Willen, Brandon Somerhalder, Berenice Chávez, Blake Neely, Dave Richards, Brent Kiser, Andrea Gibson, and Megan Falley**; 2000 Meters to Andriivka – Mstyslav Chernov, Michelle Mizner, Raney Aronson-Rath, Alex Babenko, and Sam Slater; Afternoons of Solitude – Albert Serra, Montse Triola, Luis Ferrón, Pedro Palacios, Artur Tort, Marc Verdaguer, and Jordi Ribas; Cover-Up – Laura Poitras, Mark Obenhaus, Yoni Golijov, Olivia Streisand, Mia Cioffi Henry, Amy Foote, Peter Bowman, Maya Shenfeld, and Seymour Hersh; The Perfect Neighbor – Geeta Gandbhir, Alisa Payne, Nikon Kwantu, Sam Bisbee, Viridiana Lieberman, Laura Heinzinger, and Felipe Messeder; Put Your Soul on Your Hand and Walk – Sepideh Farsi, Javad Djavahery, Fatma Hassona, Cinna Peyghamy, and Pierre Carrasco; Seeds – Brittany Shyne, Danielle Varga, Sabrina Schmidt Gordon, Malika Zouhali-Worrall, Robert Aiki Aubrey Lowe, Daniel Timmons, Ben Kruse, and Willie Head Jr.
Outstanding Direction	Outstanding Debut
**Geeta Gandbhir – The Perfect Neighbor**; Mstyslav Chernov – 2000 Meters to Andriivka; Albert Serra – Afternoons of Solitude; Ryan White – Come See Me in the Good Light; Laura Poitras and Mark Obenhaus – Cover-Up; David Osit – Predators; Brittany Shyne – Seeds	**Seeds – Directed By Brittany Shyne**; Marlee Matlin: Not Alone Anymore – Directed By Shoshannah Stern; Monk in Pieces – Directed By Billy Shebar and David C. Roberts; Remaining Native – Directed By Paige Bethmann; The Shepherd and the Bear – Directed By Max Keegan; Swamp Dogg Gets His Pool Painted – Directed By Isaac Gale and Ryan Olson
Outstanding Production	Outstanding Editing
**The Alabama Solution – Andrew Jarecki and Charlotte Kaufman**; **Apocalypse in the Tropics – Petra Costa and Alessandra Orofino**; 2000 Meters to Andriivka – Mstyslav Chernov, Michelle Mizner and Raney Aronson-Rath; Antidote – James Jones; Mr Nobody Against Putin – Helle Faber; My Undesirable Friends: Part I — Last Air in Moscow – Julia Loktev	**The Perfect Neighbor – Viridiana Lieberman**; 2000 Meters to Andriivka – Michelle Mizner; Cover-Up – Amy Foote, Peter Bowman and Laura Poitras; I'm Not Everything I Want to Be – Alexander Kashcheev; My Undesirable Friends: Part I — Last Air in Moscow – Julia Loktev and Michael Taylor; Orwell: 2+2=5 – Alexandra Strauss; Riefenstahl – Stephan Krumbiegel, Olaf Voigtländer and Alfredo Castro
Outstanding Cinematography	Outstanding Original Music Score
**Seeds – Brittany Shyne**; Afternoons of Solitude – Artur Tort; Architecton – Ben Bernhard; Come See Me in the Good Light – Brandon Somerhalder; Folktales – Lars Erlend Tubaas Øymo and Tor Edvin Eliassen; The Tale of Silyan – Jean Dakar	**Come See Me in the Good Light – Blake Neely**; 2000 Meters to Andriivka – Sam Slater; Cover-Up – Maya Shenfeld; The Eyes of Ghana – Kris Bowers; Folktales – Todd Griffin; Orwell: 2+2=5 – Alexeï Aïgui
Outstanding Sound Design	Outstanding Visual Design
**Deaf President Now! – James LeBrecht, Greg Francis and Nina Hartstone**; Architecton – Alexander Dudarev; Folktales – Andreas Lindberg Svensson; Marlee Matlin: Not Alone Anymore – Bonnie Wild; One to One: John & Yoko – Sean Ono Lennon, Sam Gannon and Simon Hilton; Seeds – Daniel Timmons and Ben Kruse	**It's Never Over, Jeff Buckley – Sara Gunnarsdóttir and Josh Shaffner**; Ghost Boy – Nominees to be determined; In Waves and War – Nominees to be determined; The New Yorker at 100 – Norn Jordan; Swamp Dogg Gets His Pool Painted – Joseph Midthun; Zodiac Killer Project – Nominees to be determined
Spotlight Award	Heterodox Award
**To the West, in Zapata – Directed By David Bim**; Always – Directed By Deming Chen; The Encampments – Directed By Michael T Workman and Kei Pritsker; Flophouse America – Directed By Monica Strømdahl; Sanatorium – Directed By Gar O'Rourke	**The Voice of Hind Rajab – Kaouther Ben Hania**; BLKNWS: Terms & Conditions – Kahlil Joseph; East of Wall – Kate Beecroft; Peter Hujar's Day – Ira Sachs; To a Land Unknown – Mahdi Fleifel; The Rehearsal – Nathan Fielder
Audience Choice Prize	The Unforgettables
**The Tale of Silyan – Directed by Tamara Kotevska**; Apocalypse in the Tropics – Directed by Petra Costa; Coexistence, My Ass! – Directed by Amber Fares; Come See Me in the Good Light – Directed by Ryan White; The Eyes of Ghana – Directed by Ben Proudfoot; It's Never Over, Jeff Buckley – Directed by Amy Berg; The Librarians – Directed by Kim A. Snyder; Marlee Matlin: Not Alone Anymore – Directed by Shoshannah Stern; Mr Nobody Against Putin – Directed by David Borenstein; Prime Minister – Directed by Michelle Walsh and Lindsay Utz	**Coexistence, My Ass! – Noam Shuster-Eliassi**; **Come See Me in the Good Light – Andrea Gibson and Megan Falley**; **Cover-Up – Seymour Hersh**; **Cutting Through Rocks – Sara Shahverdi**; **Mr Nobody Against Putin – Pasha Talankin**; **Prime Minister – Jacinda Ardern**; **Put Your Soul on Your Hand and Walk – Fatma Hassouna**

=== Shorts ===
Outstanding Non-Fiction Shortlist

- **All the Empty Rooms – Directed by Joshua Seftel**
  - Armed only with a Camera: The Life and Death of Brent Renaud – Directed by Brent Renaud and Craig Renaud
  - The Devil Is Busy – Directed by Geeta Gandbhir and Christalyn Hampton
  - Mama Micra – Directed by Rebecca Blöcher
  - Perfectly a Strangeness – Directed by Alison McAlpine
  - We Were the Scenery – Directed by Christopher Radcliff

Shortlisted

- Am I the Skinniest Person You've Ever Seen? – Directed by Eisha Marjara
- Crying Glacier – Directed by Lutz Stautner
- The Long Valley – Directed by Rodrigo Ojeda-Beck and Robert Machoian
- Who Loves the Sun – Directed by Arshia Shakiba

=== Broadcast ===
Outstanding Broadcast Film	Outstanding Nonfiction Series
**Pee-wee as Himself – Directed by Matt Wolf (HBO / Max)**; Deaf President Now! – Directed by Nyle DiMarco and Davis Guggenheim (Apple TV+); Democracy Noir – Directed by Connie Field (SWR / ARTE / DR); Enigma – Directed by Zackary Drucker (HBO / Max); My Mom Jayne – Directed by Mariska Hargitay (HBO / Max); Sly Lives! (aka The Burden of Black Genius) – Directed by Ahmir "Questlove" Thompson (Hulu)	**Social Studies – Directed by Lauren Greenfield (FX on Hulu)**; Chimp Crazy – Directed by Eric Goode (HBO / Max); Couples Therapy – Directed by Pax Wassermann (Paramount+); Dallas, 2019 – Directed by Darius Clark Monroe (PBS / Independent Lens); The Sing Sing Chronicles – Directed by Dawn Porter (MSNBC); The Stanford Prison Experiment: Unlocking the Truth – Directed by Juliette Eisner (National Geographic)
Outstanding Anthology Series
**Conan O'Brien Must Go – Conan O'Brien and Jeff Ross, executive producers (HBO / Max)**; Harlem Ice – Brian Grazer, Ron Howard, Sara Bernstein, Justin Wilkes, Robin Roberts, and Geeta Gandbhir, executive producers (Disney+); Omnivore – René Redzepi, Ben Liebmann, Chris Rice, Matt Goulding, Collin Orcutt, and Mateo Willis, executive producers (Apple TV+); Our Oceans – Jonathan Smith and James Honeyborne, executive producers (Netflix); SNL50: Beyond Saturday Night – Morgan Neville, Caitrin Rogers, and Juaquin Cambron, executive producers (Peacock); Tucci in Italy – Stanley Tucci, Lottie Birmingham, Amanda Lyon, and Simon Raikes, executive producers (National Geographic)
Outstanding Broadcast Editing	Outstanding Broadcast Cinematography
**Social Studies – Alyse Ardell Spiegel, Helen Kearns, Catherine Bull, and Charles Little II (FX on Hulu)**; Deaf President Now! – Michael Harte (Apple TV+); My Mom Jayne – JD Marlow (HBO / Max); Pee-wee as Himself – Damian Rodriguez (HBO / Max); Sly Lives! (aka The Burden of Black Genius) – Joshua L. Pearson (Hulu); Wise Guy: David Chase and the Sopranos – Andy Grieve (HBO / Max)	**Omnivore – Tom Elliott, Sy Turnbull, and Jurgen Lisse (Apple TV+)**; Chef's Table: Legends – Will Basanta (Netflix); Dallas, 2019 – Christine Ng (PBS / Independent Lens); No Taste Like Home with Antoni Porowski – Steve Lidgerwood (National Geographic); Our Oceans – Roger Munns, Roger Horrocks, Justin Maguire, Ryan Tidman, and Jamie McPherson (Netflix); Social Studies – Bryan Donnell, Jenna Rosher, and Jerry Risius (FX on Hulu)

=== Legacy Award ===
- **Portrait of Jason by Shirley Clarke**
- **Burden of Dreams by Les Blank**
- **Sans Soleil by Chris Marker**
- **Tongues Untied by Marlon T. Riggs**

=== Cinema Eye-Con Award for Career Achievement ===
- **Janus Billeskov Jansen**
