= Geeta Gandbhir =

American filmmaker

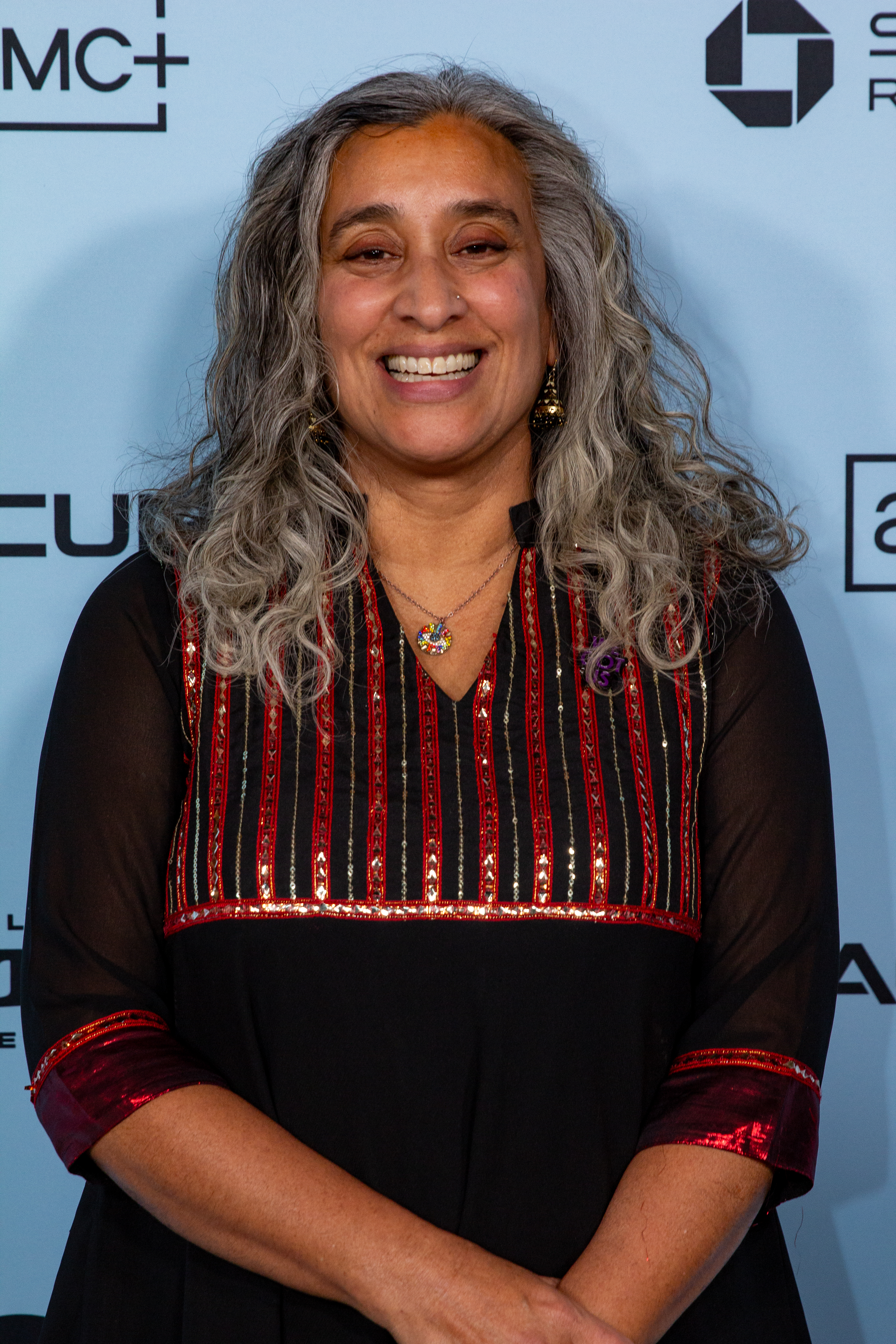
- Gandbhir at the Sundance Film Festival in 2025
- Education: Purchase College, State University of New York (SUNY) (BA)
- Occupation: Director
- Years active: 2001–present
- Children: 2

Geeta Gandbhir is an American filmmaker known for her work as a director, producer, and editor. Focusing her works on documentary and television series, she has won multiple awards including five Emmy Awards and a Peabody Awards. In 2025 she directed and produced The Perfect Neighbor, focusing on the killing of Ajike Owens, which earned her Academy Awards and British Academy Film Awards nominations.

== Early life and education ==
Gandbhir's father Sharad immigrated from India to the US in the 1960s to study chemical engineering and her mother Lalita joined him, with the passage of the Immigration and Nationality Act of 1965. Her sister Una S. Gandbhir is a superior court judge for the Third Judicial District serving Anchorage, Alaska. Her brother Ashwin Gandbhir is also a filmmaker and editor.

Gandbhir went to Purchase College, State University of New York (SUNY) where she studied Women's Studies. She later taught at Harvard University, where she was introduced to Spike Lee, who was teaching there, and an editor for Lee, Sam Pollard.

== Career ==
She started her career in narrative film working for Spike Lee and Sam Pollard, and then branched into documentary film. Her films include Hungry to Learn and I Am Evidence.

She was the editor of the Spike Lee-produced HBO documentary film If God Is Willing and da Creek Don't Rise about life after Hurricane Katrina, which won the 2010 Peabody Award.

Gandbhir was a part of the filmmaking team of the PBS film series Asian Americans which won a 2020 Peabody Award. She was a field director for And She Could Be Next, directed by Grace Lee and Marjan Safinia.

Her short film from the HBO series Through Our Eyes: Apart won a 2022 Emmy Award for Outstanding Short Documentary.

In 2023, Gandbhir directed and executive produced Born in Synanon, a documentary series for Paramount+ revolving around Synanon.

In 2025, Gandbhir directed and produced The Perfect Neighbor focusing on the Killing of Ajike Owens. It had its world premiere at the 2025 Sundance Film Festival on January 24, 2025, winning the Directing Award. That same year, she directed and executive produced Katrina: Come Hell and High Water alongside Spike Lee and Samantha Knowles for Netflix.

== Filmography ==
=== Documentary ===
| Year | Title | Director | Editor | Producer | Notes |
|---|---|---|---|---|---|
| 2008 | All of Us | No | Yes | No | |
| 2009 | By the People: The Election of Barack Obama | No | Yes | No | Also field producer |
| 2009 | Budrus | No | Yes | No | |
| 2010 | Music by Prudence | No | Yes | No | |
| 2011 | The Carrier | No | Yes | No | |
| 2013 | Which Way Is the Front Line from Here? The Life and Time of Tim Hetherington | No | Yes | No | |
| 2014 | Mr. Dynamite: The Rise of James Brown | No | Yes | No | Also editor supervisor |
| 2014 | We the Economy: 20 Short Films You Can't Afford to Miss | Co-director | No | No | |
| 2014 | Puppies Behind Bars | Co-director | No | No | |
| 2015 | A Journey of a Thousand Miles: Peacekeepers | Yes | No | Yes | |
| 2017 | I Am Evidence | Yes | No | Yes | |
| 2017 | The Talk: Race in America | No | No | Yes | |
| 2017 | Rolling Stone: Stories from the Edge | No | Yes | No | |
| 2018 | The Sentence | No | No | Co-producer | |
| 2022 | Rise and Rebuild: A Tale of Three Cities | No | No | Executive | |
| 2022 | A Tree of Life: The Pittsburgh Synagogue Shooting | No | No | Executive | |
| 2022 | Lowndes County and the Road to Black Power | Yes | No | No | |
| 2024 | New Wave | No | No | Executive | |
| 2024 | The Devil Is Busy | Co-director | No | No | |
| 2024 | New Wave | No | No | Executive | |
| 2024 | Black Table | No | No | Executive | |
| 2025 | The Perfect Neighbor | Yes | No | Yes | |
| 2025 | The Gas Station Attendant | No | No | Executive | |
| 2025 | Masaka Kids: A Rhythm Within | No | No | Yes | |

=== Television ===
| Year | Title | Director | Editor | Producer | Notes |
|---|---|---|---|---|---|
| 2001 | Take it from Home | No | Yes | No | Film TV |
| 2003–2009 | Ride with Funkmaster Flex | No | Yes | No | TV Series |
| 2005 | Miracle's Boys | No | Yes | No | Mini-series; 5 episodes |
| 2006 | African American Lives | No | Yes | No | TV series; 1 episode |
| 2006 | When the Levees Broke: A Requiem in Four Acts | No | Yes | No | Mini-series; 4 episodes |
| 2007 | Oprah's Roots: An African American Lives Special | No | Yes | No | Film TV |
| 2009 | Purizun doggu: Boku ni ikiru chikara o kureta inu | No | No | Yes | Film TV |
| 2010 | If God Is Willing and da Creek Don't Rise | No | Yes | No | Mini-series; 1 episode |
| 2015 | Op-Docs | Yes | No | Yes | TV series; 2 episodes |
| 2017 | Daughters of Destiny | No | Yes | No | Mini-series |
| 2019 | Rapture | Yes | No | No | Mini-series |
| 2018 | Doc World | No | No | Yes | TV series |
| 2019 | Why We Hate | Yes | No | No | TV series; 6 episodes |
| 2020 | Asian Americans | No | No | Yes | TV series |
| 2021 | Black and Missing | Yes | No | Executive | Mini-series; 4 episodes |
| 2023 | Born in Synanon | Yes | No | Executive | Mini-series; 4 episodes |
| 2025 | Eyes on the Prize | Yes | No | No | TV series; 1 episode |
| 2025 | Katrina: Come Hell and High Water | Yes | No | Executive | Mini-series; 3 episodes |
| 2025 | Harlem Ice | No | No | Executive | TV series; 5 episodes |

== Awards and nominations ==
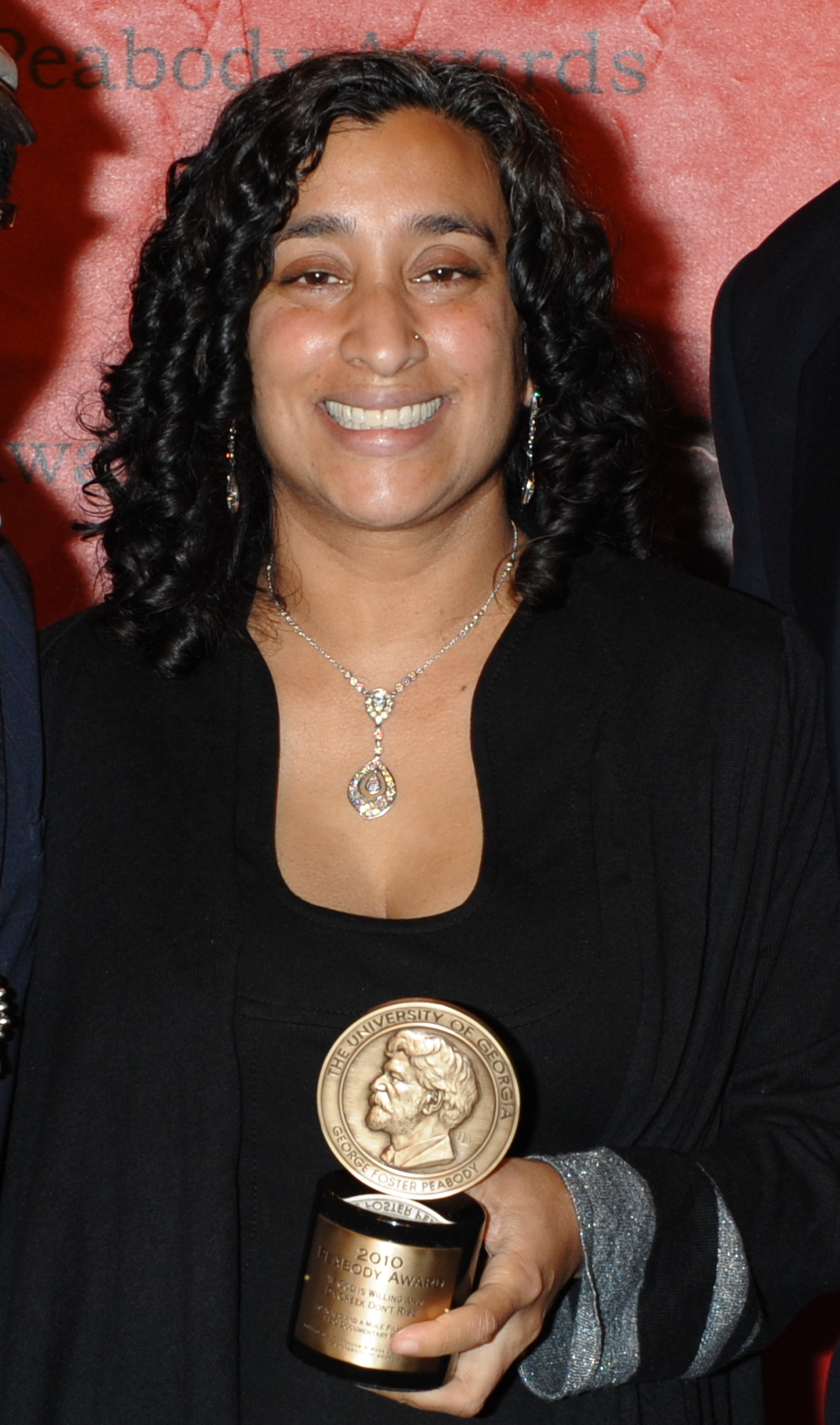
Gandbhir at the 70th Peabody Awards

=== Academy Awards ===
| Year | Work | Category | Result | Ref. |
|---|---|---|---|---|
| 2026 | The Perfect Neighbor | Best Documentary Feature Film | Nominated | |
| 2026 | The Devil Is Busy | Best Documentary Short | Nominated | |

=== British Academy Film Awards ===
| Year | Work | Category | Result | Ref. |
|---|---|---|---|---|
| 2026 | The Perfect Neighbor | Best Documentary | Nominated | |

=== Emmy Awards ===
| Year | Work | Category | Result | Ref. |
Primetime Creative Arts Emmy Awards
| 2007 | When the Levees Broke: A Requiem in Four Acts | Outstanding Picture Editing for Nonfiction Programming | Won | |
| 2010 | By the People: The Election of Barack Obama | Outstanding Picture Editing for Nonfiction Programming | Won | |
| 2011 | If God Is Willing and da Creek Don't Rise | Outstanding Picture Editing for Nonfiction Programming | Nominated | |
News and Documentary Emmy Awards
| 2015 | P.O.V. (episode "American Promise") | Outstanding Individual Achievement in a Craft: Editing - Documentary and Long Form | Nominated | |
| 2019 | HBO Documentary Films (episode "I Am Evidence") | Outstanding Documentary | Won | |
| 2019 | HBO Documentary Films (episode "I Am Evidence") | Outstanding Investigative Documentary | Nominated | |
| 2019 | Doc World: (episode "Armed With Faith") | Outstanding Politics and Government Documentary | Won | |
| 2022 | Through Our Eyes (episode "Apart") | Outstanding Short Documentary | Won | |

=== Other awards and honors ===
| Award | Year | Work | Category | Result | Ref. |
|---|---|---|---|---|---|
| African-American Film Critics Association | 2022 | Black and Missing | Best Documentary | Won | |
| American Cinema Editors Awards | 2018 | Rolling Stone: Stories from the Edge: "01" | Best Edited Documentary for Television | Nominated | |
| Atlanta Film Festival | 2016 | A Journey of a Thousand Miles: Peacekeepers | Best Documentary Feature | Nominated | |
| Astra Awards | 2026 | The Perfect Neighbor | Best Documentary Feature | Won | |
| Black Reel Awards | 2022 | Black and Missing | Outstanding Television Documentary or Special | Nominated | |
| Black Reel Awards | 2026 | The Devil is Busy | Outstanding Short Film | Won | |
| Black Reel Awards | 2026 | The Perfect Neighbor | Outstanding Documentary | Won | |
| Cinema Eye Honors | 2019 | I Am Evidence | Outstanding Broadcast Nonfiction Filmmaking | Nominated | |
| Cinema Eye Honors | 2022 | Black and Missing | Outstanding Nonfiction Series | Won | |
| Cinema Eye Honors | 2023 | Lowndes County and the Road to Black Power | Outstanding Broadcast Film | Nominated | |
| Cinema Eye Honors | 2026 | The Perfect Neighbor | Outstanding Non-Fiction Feature | Nominated | |
| Cinema Eye Honors | 2026 | The Perfect Neighbor | Outstanding Direction | Won | |
| Critics' Choice Documentary Awards | 2025 | The Perfect Neighbor | Best Director | Won | |
| Cleveland International Film Festival | 2017 | Puppies Behind Bars | Best Film | Nominated | |
| Cleveland International Film Festival | 2018 | I Am Evidence | Excellence in Directing | Nominated | |
| Cleveland International Film Festival | 2018 | I Am Evidence | Local Heroes Competition | Nominated | |
| Denver Film Festival | 2023 | How We Get Free | Best Short Film | Nominated | |
| Film Independent Spirit Awards | 2022 | Black and Missing | Best New Non-Scripted or Documentary Series | Won | |
| Film Independent Spirit Awards | 2026 | The Perfect Neighbor | Best Documentary Feature | Won | |
| Gotham Independent Film Awards | 2025 | The Perfect Neighbor | Best Documentary | Nominated | |
| Gracie Awards | 2022 | Black and Missing | Best Director | Won | |
| Hamptons International Film Festival | 2017 | I Am Evidence | Social Justice Award | Honoree | |
| NAACP Image Awards | 2022 | Black and Missing | Outstanding Directing in a Documentary (Television or Motion Picture) | Won | |
| Producers Guild of America Award | 2026 | The Perfect Neighbor | Best Documentary Motion Picture | Nominated | |
| Sundance Film Festival | 2025 | The Perfect Neighbor | Grand Jury Prize – U.S. Documentary Competition | Nominated | |
| Sundance Film Festival | 2025 | The Perfect Neighbor | Directing Award: U.S. Documentary | Won | |
