= 2025 Sundance Film Festival =

Edition of film festival

- Festival poster
- Location: Park City, Utah and Salt Lake City, Utah
- Founded: 1978
- Hosted by: Sundance Institute
- Festival date: January 23 to February 2, 2025
- Language: English
- Website: festival.sundance.org

Sundance Film Festival
- 2026 Sundance Film Festival 2024 Sundance Film Festival

The 2025 Sundance Film Festival took place in person from January 23 to February 2, 2025, in Park City and Salt Lake City, Utah, and online from January 30 to February 2. The first selection lineup was announced on December 11, 2024.

It is one of the last editions to take place in Utah, as the festival announced it will be held in Boulder, Colorado, beginning with the 2027 edition.

== Films ==
=== U.S. Dramatic Competition ===
English title	Director(s)	Production Country
Atropia	Hailey Gates	United States
Bubble & Squeak	Evan Twohy	United States
Bunnylovr	Katarina Zhu	United States
Love, Brooklyn	Rachael Abigail Holder	United States
Omaha	Cole Webley	United States
Plainclothes	Carmen Emmi	United States
Ricky	Rashad Frett	United States
Sorry, Baby	Eva Victor	United States
Sunfish (& Other Stories on Green Lake)	Sierra Falconer	United States
Twinless	James Sweeney	United States

=== World Cinema Dramatic Competition ===
English title	Original title	Director(s)	Production Country
Brides		Nadia Fall	United Kingdom
DJ Ahmet		Georgi M. Unkovski	North Macedonia, Czech Republic, Serbia, Croatia
LUZ	花明渡	Flora Lau	Hong Kong, China
Cactus Pears	Sabar Bonda	Rohan Parashuram Kanawade	India, United Kingdom, Canada
Sauna		Mathias Broe	Denmark
Sukkwan Island		Vladimir de Fontenay	France
The Things You Kill		Alireza Khatami	Turkey, France, Poland, Canada
Two Women	Deux femmes en or	Chloé Robichaud	Canada
The Virgin of the Quarry Lake	La Virgen de la tosquera	Laura Casabé	Argentina, Spain, Mexico
Where the Wind Comes From		Amel Guellaty	Tunisia, France, Qatar

=== U.S. Documentary Competition ===
Original title	Director(s)	Production Country
André Is an Idiot	Tony Benna	United States
Life After	Reid Davenport	United States
Marlee Matlin: Not Alone Anymore	Shoshannah Stern	United States
The Perfect Neighbor	Geeta Gandbhir	United States
Predators	David Osit	United States
Seeds	Brittany Shyne	United States
Selena y Los Dinos	Isabel Castro	United States
Speak.	Jennifer Tiexiera, Guy Mossman	United States
Sugar Babies	Rachel Fleit	United States
Third Act	Tadashi Nakamura	United States

=== World Documentary Competition ===
English title	Original title	Director(s)	Production Country
2000 Meters to Andriivka		Mstyslav Chernov	Ukraine
Coexistence, My Ass!		Amber Fares	United States, France
Cutting Through Rocks	اوزاک یوللار	Sara Khaki, Mohammadreza Eyni	Iran, Germany, United States, Netherlands, Qatar, Chile, Canada
The Dating Game		Violet Du Feng	United States, United Kingdom, Norway
Endless Cookie		Seth Scriver, Peter Scriver	Canada
Gen_		Gianluca Matarrese	France, Italy, Switzerland
How to Build a Library		Maia Lekow, Christopher King	Kenya
Khartoum		Anas Saaed, Rawia Alhag, Ibrahim Snoopy Ahmad, Timeea Mohamed Ahmed, Phil Cox	Sudan, United Kingdom, Germany, Qatar
Mr. Nobody Against Putin		David Borenstein	Denmark, Czech Republic
Prime Minister		Michelle Walshe, Lindsay Utz	United States

=== Premieres ===
English title	Original title	Director(s)	Production Country
The Alabama Solution		Andrew Jarecki, Charlotte Kaufman	United States
All That's Left of You	اللي باقي منك	Cherien Dabis	Germany, Cyprus
The Ballad of Wallis Island		James Griffiths	United Kingdom
Come See Me in the Good Light		Ryan White	United States
Deaf President Now!		Nyle DiMarco, Davis Guggenheim	United States
Enigma		Zackary Drucker	United States
Folktales		Heidi Ewing, Rachel Grady	United States, Norway
Free Leonard Peltier		Jesse Short Bull, David France	United States
Heightened Scrutiny		Sam Feder	United States
If I Had Legs I'd Kick You		Mary Bronstein	United States
It's Never Over, Jeff Buckley		Amy Berg	United States
Jimpa		Sophie Hyde	Australia, Netherlands, Finland
Kiss of the Spider Woman		Bill Condon	United States
Last Days		Justin Lin	United States
The Librarians		Kim A. Snyder	United States
Lurker		Alex Russell	United States
Magic Farm		Amalia Ulman	Argentina, United States
Middletown		Jesse Moss, Amanda McBaine	United States
Move Ya Body: The Birth of House		Elegance Bratton	United States
Oh, Hi!		Sophie Brooks	United States
Peter Hujar's Day		Ira Sachs	United States
Rebuilding		Max Walker-Silverman	United States
Sally		Cristina Costantini	United States
The Secret of Me		Grace Hughes-Hallett	United States
Sly Lives! (aka The Burden of Black Genius)		Ahmir "Questlove" Thompson	United States
The Stringer		Bao Nguyen	
The Thing with Feathers		Dylan Southern	United Kingdom
Train Dreams		Clint Bentley	United States
The Wedding Banquet		Andrew Ahn	United States

=== Next ===
English title	Director(s)	Production Country
BLKNWS: Terms & Conditions	Kahlil Joseph	United States
By Design	Amanda Kramer	United States
East of Wall	Kate Beecroft	United States
Mad Bills to Pay (or Destiny, dile que no soy malo)	Joel Alfonso Vargas	United States
OBEX	Albert Birney	United States
Rains Over Babel (Llueve sobre Babel)	Gala del Sol	Colombia, United States, Spain
Serious People	Pasqual Gutierrez	United States
Zodiac Killer Project	Charlie Shackleton	United States

=== Midnight ===
English title	Director(s)	Production Country
Dead Lover	Grace Glowicki	Canada
Didn't Die	Meera Menon	United States
Opus	Mark Anthony Green	United States
Rabbit Trap	Bryn Chainey	United Kingdom
Together	Michael Shanks	Australia, United States
Touch Me	Addison Heimann	United States
The Ugly Stepsister	Emilie Blichfeldt	Norway

=== Spotlight ===
English title	Original title	Director(s)	Production Country
April		Dea Kulumbegashvili	Georgia
One to One: John & Yoko		Kevin Macdonald	United Kingdom

=== From the Collection ===
English title	Director(s)	Production Country
El Norte	Gregory Nava	United States
Unzipped	Douglas Keeve	United States

=== Episodic ===
Original title	Director(s)	Production Country
Bucks County, USA	Barry Levinson, Robert May	United States
Hal & Harper	Cooper Raiff	United States
Pee-wee as Himself	Matt Wolf	United States

=== Episodic Pilot ===
Original title	Director(s)	Production Country
Bulldozer	Joanna Leeds, Andrew Leeds	United States
Chasers	Erin Brown Thomas	United States
Never Get Busted!	David Anthony Ngo, Erin Williams-Weir	United States

=== Family Matinee ===
Original title	Director(s)	Production Country
The Legend of Ochi	Isaiah Saxon	United States

=== U.S. Fiction Short Films ===
Title	Director(s)	Production Country
An Almost Successful Dating App Love Story	Winter Coleman	United States
Azi	Montana Mann	United States
Debaters	Alex Heller	United States
Em & Selma Go Griffin Hunting	Alexander Thompson	United States
En Memoria	Roberto Fatal	United States
Full Month	Ash Goh Hua	Singapore, United States
Goodnight	Isabel Pask	United States
The Lily (เดอะลิลลี่)	Quintessa Swindell	United States, Thailand
Out for Delivery	Chelsea Christer	United States
Ragamuffin	Kaitlyn Mikayla	United States
Remember Me	Claire Titelman	United States
Somebody Cares	Julien Lasseur	United States
Such Good Friends	Bri Klaproth	United States
Susana	Gerardo Coello Escalante, Amandine Thomas	Mexico, United States
Sweet Talkin’ Guy	Spencer Wardwell, Dylan Wardwell	United States
Swollen	Roxy Sophie Sorkin	United States
The Things We Keep	Joanna Fernandez	United States
Trokas Duras	Jazmin Garcia	United States
Unholy	Daisy Friedman	United States
Vox Humana	Don Josephus Raphael Eblahan	Philippines, United States
We're Not Done Yet	Joseph Longo	United States

=== International Fiction Short Films ===
Title	Director(s)	Production Country
Almost Certainly False	Cansu Baydar	Turkey
Are You Scared to Be Yourself Because You Think That You Might Fail?	Bec Pecaut	Canada
B(l)ind the Sacrifice	Nakhane	South Africa
Grandma Nai Who Played Favorites	Chheangkea	Cambodia, France
Hippopotami	Jianjie Lin	China, Hong Kong
Pasta Negra	Jorge Thielen Armand	Canada, Venezuela, Italy, Colombia
People & Things	Damian Kosowski	Poland
Platanero	Juan Frank Hernandez	Canada
Stranger, Brother.	Annelise Hickey	Australia
Suo Jiang	Chien-Yu Lin	Taiwan
Sweetheart	Luke Wintour	United Kingdom
Upper	Lennert Madou	Belgium

=== Animated Short Films ===
Title	Director(s)	Production Country
Bunnyhood	Mansi Maheshwari	United Kingdom
Caries	Aline Höchli	Switzerland
Como si la tierra se las hubiera tragado	Natalia León	France
The Eating of an Orange	May Kindred-Boothby	United Kingdom
Field Recording	Quinne Larsen	United States
Flower Show	Elli Vuorinen	Finland
Hurikán	Jan Saska	Czech Republic
Inkwo for When the Starving Return	Amanda Strong	Canada
Jesus 2	Jesse Moynihan	United States
Luz Diabla	Gervasio Canda, Paula Boffo, Patricio Plaza	Argentina, Canada
Paradise Man (ii)	Jordan Michael Blake	United States
A Round of Applause for Death	Stephen Irwin	United Kingdom
View from the Floor	Megan Griffiths, Mindie Lind	United States

=== Nonfiction Short Films ===
Title	Director(s)	Production Country
Deadlock	Lucien Beucher, Mahdi Boucif	France, Algeria
Death Education	Yuxuan Ethan Wu	China
Entre le feu et le clair de lune	Dominic Yarabe	United States, Côte d'Ivoire
The Flowers Stand Silently, Witnessing	Theo Panagopoulos	United Kingdom
Hold Me Close	Aurora Brachman, LaTajh Simmons-Weaver	United States
Hoops, Hopes & Dreams	Glenn Kaino	United States
The Long Valley	Robert Machoian, Rodrigo Ojeda-Beck	United States
Miss You Perdularia	Manu Zilveti	Cuba
The Reality of Hope	Joe Hunting	United Kingdom, Sweden
Tiger	Loren Waters	United States
We Were the Scenery	Christopher Radcliff	United States

== Awards ==
=== Grand Jury Prizes ===
- U.S. Dramatic – Atropia by Hailey Gates
- U.S. Documentary – Seeds by Brittany Shyne
- World Cinema Dramatic – Cactus Pears by Rohan Parashuram Kanawade
- World Cinema Documentary – Cutting Through Rocks by Sara Khaki, Mohammadreza Eyni
- Short Film – The Flowers Stand Silently, Witnessing by Theo Panagopoulos

=== Audience Awards ===
- U.S. Dramatic – Twinless by James Sweeney
- U.S. Documentary – André is an Idiot by Tony Benna
- World Cinema Dramatic – DJ Ahmet by Georgi M. Unkovski
- World Cinema Documentary – Prime Minister by Michelle Walshe, Lindsay Utz
- NEXT – East of Wall by Kate Beecroft

=== Directing, Screenwriting and Editing ===
- Directing Award: U.S. Dramatic – Rashad Frett for Ricky
- Directing Award: U.S. Documentary – Geeta Gandbhir for The Perfect Neighbor
- Directing Award: World Cinema Dramatic – Alireza Khatami for The Things You Kill
- Directing Award: World Cinema Documentary – Mstyslav Chernov for 2000 Meters to Andriivka
- Waldo Salt Screenwriting Award – Eva Victor for Sorry, Baby
- Jonathan Oppenheim Editing Award: U.S. Documentary – Parker Laramie for André is an Idiot
- NEXT Innovator Prize – Zodiac Killer Project by Charlie Shackleton

=== Special Jury Prizes ===
- U.S. Dramatic Special Jury Award for Ensemble Cast – The cast of Plainclothes
- U.S. Dramatic Special Jury Award for Acting – Dylan O’Brien for Twinless
- U.S. Documentary Special Jury Award – Life After by Reid Davenport
- U.S. Documentary Special Jury Award for Archival Storytelling – Selena y Los Dinos by Isabel Castro
- World Cinema Documentary Special Jury Award – Mr. Nobody Against Putin by David Borenstein
- World Cinema Documentary Special Jury Award for Freedom of Expression – Coexistence, My Ass! by Amber Fares
- World Cinema Dramatic Special Jury Award for Creative Vision – Georgi M. Unkovski for DJ Ahmet
- World Cinema Dramatic Special Jury Award for Writing – Two Women by Chloé Robichaud and Catherine Léger
- Next: Special Jury Award for Ensemble Cast – Mad Bills to Pay (or Destiny, dile que no soy malo) by Joel Alfonso Vargas

=== Short Film Jury Awards ===
- U.S. Fiction – Trokas Duras by Jazmin Garcia
- Short Film Special Jury Award for Directing – Loren Waters for Tiger
- Short Film Special Jury Award for Animation Directing – May Kindred-Boothby for The Eating of an Orange
- Short Film Jury Award: Animation – Natalia León for Como si la tierra se las hubiera tragado
- Short Film Jury Award: Nonfiction – Christopher Radcliff for We Were the Scenery
- Short Film Jury Award: International Fiction – Chheangkea for Grandma Nai Who Played Favorites

=== Festival Favorite Award ===
- Come See Me in the Good Light by Ryan White

== Venues ==
The 2025 Sundance Film Festival venues are a subset of previous years. They include:

Park City

- Eccles Theater (1750 Kearns Blvd)
- Egyptian Theatre (328 Main Street)
- Holiday Village Cinemas (1776 Park Avenue)
- Park City Library Theatre (1255 Park Avenue)
- The Ray Theatre (1768 Park Avenue)
- Megaplex Theatres Park City at Redstone (6030 North Market Street)

Salt Lake City

- Rose Wagner Performing Arts Center (138 West 300 South)
- Broadway Centre Cinemas (111 East Broadway)

== Acquisitions ==
- The Ugly Stepsister: Shudder
- One to One: John & Yoko: Magnolia Pictures
- The Reality of Hope: Asteria and Documentary+
- Together: Neon
- Train Dreams: Netflix
- Sorry, Baby: A24
- Peter Hujar's Day: Janus Films and Sideshow
- The Perfect Neighbor: Netflix
- Lurker: Mubi (United States), Focus Features (International)
- Obex: Oscilloscope Laboratories
- East of Wall: Sony Pictures Classics
- Dead Lover: Cartuna x Dweck
- Oh, Hi!: Sony Pictures Classics
- Kiss of the Spider Woman: Lionsgate, Roadside Attractions and LD Entertainment
- Predators: MTV Documentary Films
- Cactus Pears: Strand Releasing
- The Thing With Feathers: Briarcliff Entertainment
- Twinless: Lionsgate and Roadside Attractions (United States), Sony Pictures Worldwide Acquisitions (International) (Note: Republic Pictures handled distribution of the film at the time of its Sundance premiere.)
- The Things You Kill: Cineverse
- Come See Me in the Good Light: Apple TV+
- Rebuilding: Bleecker Street
- Marlee Matlin: Not Alone Anymore: Kino Lorber
- Plainclothes : Magnolia Pictures
- Omaha: Greenwich Entertainment
- Folktales: Magnolia Pictures
- Prime Minister: Magnolia Pictures, HBO Documentary Films and CNN Films
- Love, Brooklyn: Greenwich Entertainment
- Selena y Los Dinos: Netflix
- Touch Me: Yellow Veil Pictures
- Two Women: Joint Venture
- It's Never Over, Jeff Buckley: Magnolia Pictures
- Hal & Harper: Mubi
- Last Days: Vertical
- Rabbit Trap: Magnet Releasing
- Sunfish (& Other Stories on Green Lake): The Future of Film Is Female
- By Design: Music Box Films
- All That's Left of You: Watermelon Pictures
- Mad Bills to Pay: Oscilloscope Laboratories
- BLKNWS: Terms & Conditions : Rich Spirit
- Atropia: Vertical
- Jimpa: Kino Lorber
- Ricky: Blue Harbor Entertainment
- Bunnylovr: Utopia
- Free Leonard Peltier: Netflix
- Middletown (later Teenaged Wasteland): Netflix
