= 10th Critics' Choice Documentary Awards =

Film award ceremony

- Date: November 9, 2025
- Site: Edison Ballroom, New York City, United States
- Hosted by: Aasif Mandvi
- Most wins: The Perfect Neighbor (5)
- Most nominations: Orwell: 2+2=5 (7)

Television/radio coverage
- Network: Facebook Live; YouTube; X

The 10th Critics Choice Documentary Awards, presented by the Critics Choice Association, were held on November 9, 2025, at the Edison Ballroom in New York City, to honor the finest achievements in documentary filmmaking and non-fiction television. British-American comedian Aasif Mandvi hosted the ceremony.

Nominations were announced on October 14, 2025. Orwell: 2+2=5 led the nominations with seven, followed by The Perfect Neighbor with six; 2000 Meters to Andriivka and The Alabama Solution, both with five each; and Apocalypse in the Tropics and Deaf President Now!, with four nods each.

American filmmaker Ken Burns was honored with the Critics Choice Impact Award, while American filmmakers Heidi Ewing and Rachel Grady received the Pennebaker Award.

== Winners and nominees ==
The nominations were announced on October 14, 2025. Winners will be listed first and in bold.

**Best Documentary Feature**: **The Perfect Neighbor (Netflix)**; 2000 Meters to Andriivka (Frontline Features / The Associated Press); The Alabama Solution (HBO Max); Apocalypse in the Tropics (Netflix); Cover-Up (Netflix); Deaf President Now! (Apple TV+); Orwell: 2+2=5 (Neon); Pee-wee as Himself (HBO Max); Riefenstahl (Kino Lorber); The Tale of Silyan (National Geographic)	**Best Director**: **Geeta Gandbhir – The Perfect Neighbor (Netflix)**; Mstyslav Chernov – 2000 Meters to Andriivka (Frontline Features / The Associated Press); Petra Costa – Apocalypse in the Tropics (Netflix); Nyle DiMarco and Davis Guggenheim – Deaf President Now! (Apple TV+); Andrew Jarecki and Charlotte Kaufman – The Alabama Solution (HBO Max); Raoul Peck – Orwell: 2+2=5 (Neon)
**Best First Documentary Feature**: **My Mom Jayne: A Film by Mariska Hargitay – Mariska Hargitay (HBO Max)**; Art for Everybody – Miranda Yousef (Tremolo Productions); Grand Theft Hamlet – San Crane and Pinny Grylls (Mubi); Seeds – Brittany Shyne (Interior Films); Stiller & Meara: Nothing Is Lost – Ben Stiller (Apple TV+); Strange Journey: The Story of Rocky Horror – Linus O'Brien (Margot Station)	**Best True Crime Documentary**: **The Perfect Neighbor (Netflix)**; The Alabama Solution (HBO Max); Gone Girls: The Long Island Serial Killer (Netflix); Predators (MTV Documentary Films / Paramount+); Unknown Number: The High School Catfish (Netflix); The Yogurt Shop Murders (HBO Max)
**Best Archival Documentary**: **The Perfect Neighbor (Netflix)**; One to One: John & Yoko (Magnolia Pictures); Orwell: 2+2=5 (Neon); Riefenstahl (Kino Lorber); Trains (EPF Media / Drygas Film Production); WTO/99 (Foghorn Features)	**Best Biographical Documentary**: **Mr. Scorsese (Apple TV+)**; John Candy: I Like Me (Prime Video); Love+War (National Geographic); My Mom Jayne: A Film by Mariska Hargitay (HBO Max); Pee-wee as Himself (HBO Max); Stiller & Meara: Nothing Is Lost (Apple TV+)
**Best Political Documentary**: **The Alabama Solution (HBO Max)**; Apocalypse in the Tropics (Netflix); Deaf President Now! (Apple TV+); The Librarians (Independent Lens); My Undesirable Friends: Part I — Last Air in Moscow (Marminchilla); Orwell: 2+2=5 (Neon)	**Best Sports Documentary**: **America's Sweethearts: Dallas Cowboys Cheerleaders (Netflix)**; America's Team: The Gambler and His Cowboys (Netflix); Big Dreams: Little League World Series 2024 (ESPN Films); Full Court Press (ESPN+); Southpaw: The Life and Legacy of Jim Abbott (ESPN); We Beat the Dream Team (HBO Max)
**Best Historical Documentary**: **The American Revolution (PBS)**; **Hurricane Katrina: Race Against Time (National Geographic)**; Cover-Up (Netflix); Eyes on the Prize III: We Who Believe in Freedom Cannot Rest 1977-2015 (HBO Max); Number One on the Call Sheet (Apple TV+); Riefenstahl (Kino Lorber)	**Best Science/Nature Documentary**: **Ocean with David Attenborough (National Geographic)**; The Americas (NBC); Checkpoint Zoo (Abramorama); The Last Rhinos: A New Hope (National Geographic); Octopus! (Prime Video); Pangolin: Kulu's Journey (Netflix)
**Best Music Documentary**: **Becoming Led Zeppelin (Sony Pictures Classics)**; **Sly Lives! (aka The Burden of Black Genius) (Hulu)**; Billy Joel: And So It Goes (HBO Max); Bono: Stories of Surrender (Apple TV+); It's Never Over, Jeff Buckley (Magnolia Pictures); Ladies & Gentlemen... 50 Years of SNL Music (NBC)	**Best Short Documentary**: **Saving Superman (Switchboard)**; All the Empty Rooms (Netflix); Classroom 4 (PBS); The Devil Is Busy (HBO Max); Exodus (Park County); Fiddler on the Moon: Judaism in Space (Ironbound Films); Sallie's Ashes (Robi Creative); Shanti Rides Shotgun (Voyager)
**Best Ongoing Documentary Series**: **30 for 30 (ESPN Films)**; American Masters (PBS); The Reluctant Traveler (Apple TV+); Solo Traveling with Tracee Ellis Ross (Roku Channel); Trafficked with Mariana van Zeller (National Geographic); Trainwreck (Netflix)	**Best Limited Documentary Series**: **Mr. Scorsese (Apple TV+)**; The American Revolution (PBS); Eyes on the Prize III: We Who Believe in Freedom Cannot Rest 1977-2015 (HBO Max); Gone Girls: The Long Island Serial Killer (Netflix); Hurricane Katrina: Race Against Time (National Geographic); Magic City: An American Fantasy (Starz); SNL50: Beyond Saturday Night (Peacock); The Yogurt Shop Murders (HBO Max)
**Best Narration**: **Orwell: 2+2=5 – Written by George Orwell; Adapted by Raoul Peck; Performed by Damian Lewis (Neon)**; 2000 Meters to Andriivka – Written and performed by Mstyslav Chernov (Frontline Features / The Associated Press); The American Revolution – Written by Geoffrey C. Ward; Performed by Peter Coyote (PBS); The Americas – Written by Michael Gunton, Holly Spearing, Steve Cole, Kathryn Jeffs, Matt Richards, Giles Badger, Victoria Buckley, Alex Griffiths, Hannah Hoare, Poppy Riddle, Gillian Taylor, Nikki Waldron, Evie Wright, Charlotte Bostock, Victoria Bobin, and Ingrid Kvale; Performed by Tom Hanks (NBC); Apocalypse in the Tropics – Written and performed by Petra Costa (Netflix); Octopus! – Written by Gabriel Bisset-Smith; Performed by Phoebe Waller-Bridge (Prime Video)	**Best Score**: **Orwell: 2+2=5 – Alexei Aigui (Neon)**; The Eyes of Ghana – Kris Bowers (Breakwater Studios / Higher Ground Media); The Perfect Neighbor – Laura Heinzinger (Netflix); Love+War – Claudia Sarne (National Geographic); 2000 Meters to Andriivka – Sam Slater (Frontline Features / The Associated Press); Trains – Paweł Szymański (EPF Media / Drygas Film Production)
**Best Cinematography**: **Ocean with David Attenborough – Toby Strong and Doug Anderson (National Geographic)**; Architecton – Ben Bernhard (A24); The Tale of Silyan – Jean Dakar (National Geographic); Mistress Dispeller – Elizabeth Lo (Oscilloscope); Folktales – Lars Erlend Tubaas Øymo and Tor Edvin Eliassen (Magnolia Pictures); Seeds – Brittany Shyne (Interior Films)	**Best Editing**: **The Perfect Neighbor – Viridiana Lieberman (Netflix)**; Deaf President Now! – Michael Harte (Apple TV+); Ladies & Gentlemen... 50 Years of SNL Music – James Lester, Oz Rodríguez, and John MacDonald (NBC); The Alabama Solution – Page Marsella (HBO Max); 2000 Meters to Andriivka – Michelle Mizner (Frontline Features / The Associated Press); Orwell: 2+2=5 – Alexandra Strauss (Neon)

=== Pennebaker Award ===
- **Heidi Ewing and Rachel Grady**

=== Critics Choice Impact Award ===
- **Ken Burns**

== Films with multiple wins and nominations ==
Films with multiple wins
Wins	Film
5	The Perfect Neighbor
2	Ocean with David Attenborough
2	Orwell: 2+2=5
2	Mr. Scorsese

Films with multiple nominations
Nominations	Film	Production company(ies)
7	Orwell: 2+2=5	Neon
6	The Perfect Neighbor	Netflix
5	2000 Meters to Andriivka	Frontline Features / The Associated Press
5	The Alabama Solution	HBO Max
4	Apocalypse in the Tropics	Netflix
4	Deaf President Now!	Apple TV+
3	Riefenstahl	Kino Lorber
3	The American Revolution	PBS
2	Cover-Up	Netflix
2	Gone Girls: The Long Island Serial Killer	Netflix
2	Pee-wee as Himself	HBO Max
2	My Mom Jayne: A Film by Mariska Hargitay	HBO Max
2	Eyes on the Prize III: We Who Believe in Freedom Cannot Rest 1977-2015	HBO Max
2	The Yogurt Shop Murders	HBO Max
2	The Tale of Silyan	National Geographic
2	Ocean with David Attenborough	National Geographic
2	Love+War	National Geographic
2	Hurricane Katrina: Race Against Time	National Geographic
2	Seeds	Interior Films
2	Stiller & Meara: Nothing Is Lost	Apple TV+
2	Mr. Scorsese	Apple TV+
2	Ladies & Gentlemen... 50 Years of SNL Music	NBC
2	The Americas	NBC
2	Trains	EPF Media / Drygas Film Production
2	Octopus!	Prime Video
