= We Were the Scenery =

2025 American short documentary film

- Promotional poster
- Directed by: Christopher Radcliff
- Written by: Cathy Linh Che
- Produced by: Cathy Linh Che; Jess X. Snow
- Starring: Hoa Thi Che; Hue Nguyen Che
- Cinematography: Jess X. Snow
- Edited by: Christopher Radcliff
- Music by: Eliot Leigh
- Distributed by: Travelling Distribution; Parallax Film Sales
- Release date: January 25, 2025 (Sundance)
- Running time: 15 minutes
- Countries: United States; Canada
- Language: Vietnamese

We Were the Scenery is a 2025 American-Canadian documentary short film, directed by Christopher Radcliff. The film is based on the experiences of writer Cathy Linh Che’s parents, two Vietnam War refugees who, while in a refugee camp in the Philippines, were utilized as background extras in Apocalypse Now. It had its world premiere at the 2025 Sundance Film Festival on January 25, 2025.

It was shortlisted for the Best Documentary Short Film at the 98th Academy Awards.

== Summary ==
The film tells the story of Hoa Thi Le and Hue Nguyen Che, who left Vietnam in 1975 after the end of the war and travelled by boat to a refugee camp in the Philippines. During their time there, they were hired as extras for the production of Apocalypse Now, Francis Ford Coppola's 1979 Academy Award-winning American psychological epic war film, which was partly filmed in Baler Bay, Philippines. The film examines the intersection between their real experiences and the fictional world of the Hollywood shoot. Written by poet Cathy Linh Che, the couple’s daughter, the documentary combines first‑person narration, 16mm home‑movie footage, and material from Apocalypse Now. It reflects on memory, representation, colonial histories, and the ways cinema shapes narratives about the past and about others.

== Cast ==
- Hoa Thi Che
- Hue Nguyen Che

== Production ==
The film was shot on location in Vietnam, the Philippines, and Long Beach, California.

== Release ==
We Were the Scenery had its world premiere at the 2025 Sundance Film Festival on January 25, 2025.

The film was presented in 34th Edition Shortsfest: Program 1 at the Aspen Shortsfest on March 31, 2025. and on April 6, 2025 at the Visions du Réel in the International Medium Length & Short Film Competition section. It was also screened at the Florida Film Festival on April 19, 2025. and at the San Francisco International Film Festival in Shorts + Mid-Lengths section on April 25, 2025.

It was screened on May 16, 2025, at the 2025 Seattle International Film Festival as a part of ShortsFest Opening Night.

The film was presented in the Live Shorts section of the 2025 Palm Springs International Festival of Short Films on June 25, 2025,

It was presented at the Indy Shorts International Film Festival on July 22, 2025.

It had its Philadelphia premiere on July 31, 2025 at the BlackStar Film Festival in Short Documentary.

It was screened on September 20, 2025, at the Nashville Film Festival as a part of Documentary Shorts.

On November 14, 2025, it was screened in the Short List Shorts: Family Album at Doc NYC along with other three films. and on November 19, 2025, it was screened in the QCShorts Expo Program 1: Unthinkable Atrocities at 2025 QCinema International Film Festival along with other five films.

== Accolades ==
Award	Date of ceremony	Category	Recipient(s)	Result	Ref.
Sundance Film Festival	January 31, 2025	Short Film Jury Award: Nonfiction	Christopher Radcliff	Won	
Sundance Film Festival	January 31, 2025	Grand Jury Prize	We Were the Scenery	Nominated	
Galway Film Fleadh	July 13, 2025	Best International Short Documentary	We Were the Scenery	Won	
San Diego Asian Film Festival	November 15, 2025	Best Documentary Short	We Were the Scenery	Won	
Cinema Eye Honors	January 8, 2026	Outstanding Non-Fiction Short	We Were the Scenery	Shortlisted	

== See also ==
- Academy Award for Best Documentary Short Film
- Submissions for Best Documentary Short Academy Award
- Hearts of Darkness: A Filmmaker's Apocalypse - 1991 documentary featuring behind-the scenes footage documented by Eleanor Coppola
