= The Perfect Neighbor =

2025 documentary film by Geeta Gandbhir

- Promotional poster
- Directed by: Geeta Gandbhir
- Produced by: Alisa Payne; Geeta Gandbhir; Nikon Kwantu; Sam Bisbee
- Cinematography: Alfredo De Lara
- Edited by: Viridiana Lieberman
- Music by: Laura Heinzinger
- Production companies: Message Pictures; Park Pictures; SO'B Productions
- Distributed by: Netflix
- Release dates: January 24, 2025 (Sundance); October 10, 2025 (United States)
- Running time: 97 minutes
- Country: United States
- Language: English

The Perfect Neighbor is a 2025 American documentary film directed by Geeta Gandbhir about a shooting incident on June 2, 2023 where a white woman, Susan Louise Lorincz, fatally shot Ajike Owens, her black neighbor, in Ocala, Florida.

The film is told in chronological order with limited narration and mostly using pre-existing police footage such as bodycams, and follows both the lead-up to the killing, the incident itself and its aftermath, from the neighborhood disputes eventually escalating into the killing to Lorincz's conviction for manslaughter, among other charges. As the killing itself did, the film notably questions the systemic bias in how Florida's stand-your-ground laws are applied.

The film had its world premiere at the 2025 Sundance Film Festival on January 24, where it won the Directing Award. It had a limited theatrical release in the U.S. on October 10, prior to streaming globally on Netflix on October 17. It received widespread acclaim for its production, direction and editing, and its effective questioning of the circumstances surrounding Owens' death and similar incidents. At the 98th Academy Awards, it was nominated for Best Documentary.

== Premise ==
On June 2, 2023, in Ocala, Florida, Ajike "AJ" Shantrell Owens was shot and killed by Susan Lorincz. The film explores disputes leading up to the shooting by using bodycam footage. It includes footage from a selection of the multiple times that deputies from the Marion County Sheriff's Office responded to: calls from Lorincz in 2022 and 2023; a call from an auto repair operator in March 2023, after Lorincz repeatedly rammed her pickup truck into the gate at his workplace; a visit by Lorincz to report her complaints in person at the Sheriff's Office in May 2023; the multiple 911 calls, including from Lorincz, when she shot Owens on June 2, 2023; and Lorincz being questioned by Sheriff's detectives at the station. Sheriff's Office footage from the next few days, such as Lorincz retrieving items from her house, and from her further interviews at the Sheriff's Office, is included.

== Production ==
The victim, Ajike Owens, was the best friend of director Geeta Gandbhir's sister-in-law. Concerned that Susan Lorincz would use the stand-your-ground law, Gandbhir's partner and fellow producer Nikon Kwantu went to Florida and began documenting and filming the case.

In an interview with Film Comment, Gandbhir distinguished the film from typical true crime documentaries, stating: "I do not think of this film as true crime. This is a story that happened to my family, and I made it to mitigate grief." She described the film's approach to police body camera footage as an intentional subversion: "Police body-cam footage is used to surveil communities of color in order to protect the police, so we wanted to flip that on its head and use it to show the point of view of this community." After the Netflix acquisition, a portion of the licensing fee was directed to a fund supporting Owens's mother, Pamela Dias, and her four children.

== Release ==
The film had its world premiere at the 2025 Sundance Film Festival on January 24, 2025. It also screened at South by Southwest on March 9, 2025. The film also screened at CPH:DOX, the Miami Film Festival, Full Frame Documentary Film Festival—where it received a Special Jury Award—and Sheffield DocFest. It later screened at the New York Film Festival in fall 2025. In February 2025, Netflix was reportedly in final negotiations to acquire the film for $5 million. The deal was finalized in March 2025, with Netflix planning to release the documentary later that year. It later went live on Netflix in October of 2025, where it held the position of most watched movie in the U.S. within days of its release. Soledad O'Brien served as an executive producer.

== Reception ==
=== Critical response ===
On the review aggregator website Rotten Tomatoes, 99% of 99 critics' reviews are positive, with an average rating of 8.4/10. The website's consensus reads: "As gripping as it is deeply unsettling, The Perfect Neighbor lays bare the systemic failures and the quiet terror embedded in American legal systems with surgical precision." Metacritic, which uses a weighted average, assigned the film a score of 83 out of 100, based on 21 critics, indicating "universal acclaim".

Writing for RogerEbert.com, critic Jourdain Searles gave the film three out of four stars and wrote that the title is "so unassuming that even the most casual viewer can guess how harrowing the film they’re about to see will be," going on to say that the film is "good" but ultimately yet another example of how media continues "to studiously document senseless suffering" without effecting real change. Robert Abele of the Los Angeles Times wrote that "while The Perfect Neighbor is, on the most visceral level, a documentary horror film built with police footage, it also reveals how a violent tragedy can be unwittingly manifested by unchecked grievance and a law that weaponizes white fear more than it guards anyone's peace."

=== Accolades ===
Award / Film Festival	Date of ceremony	Category	Recipient(s)	Result	Ref.
Sundance Film Festival	February 2, 2025	Grand Jury Prize – U.S. Documentary Competition	The Perfect Neighbor	Nominated	
Sundance Film Festival	February 2, 2025	Directing Award: U.S. Documentary	Geeta Gandbhir	Won	
CPH:DOX	March 30, 2025	F:ACT Award: Special Mention	The Perfect Neighbor	Won	
Critics' Choice Documentary Awards	November 9, 2025	Best Documentary Feature	The Perfect Neighbor	Won	
Critics' Choice Documentary Awards	November 9, 2025	Best True Crime Documentary	The Perfect Neighbor	Won	
Critics' Choice Documentary Awards	November 9, 2025	Best Archival Documentary	The Perfect Neighbor	Won	
Critics' Choice Documentary Awards	November 9, 2025	Best Director	Geeta Gandbhir	Won	
Critics' Choice Documentary Awards	November 9, 2025	Best Score	Laura Heinzinger	Nominated	
Critics' Choice Documentary Awards	November 9, 2025	Best Editing	Viridiana Lieberman	Won	
Gotham Independent Film Awards	December 1, 2025	Best Documentary Feature	Geeta Gandbhir, Sam Bisbee, Nikon Kwantu, and Alisa Payne	Nominated	
Critics' Choice Movie Awards	January 4, 2026	Best Editing	Viridiana Lieberman	Nominated	
Cinema Eye Honors	January 8, 2026	Outstanding Non-Fiction Feature	Geeta Gandbhir, Alisa Payne, Nikon Kwantu, Sam Bisbee, Viridiana Lieberman, Laura Heinzinger, and Felipe Messeder	Nominated	
Cinema Eye Honors	January 8, 2026	Outstanding Direction	Geeta Gandbhir	Won	
Cinema Eye Honors	January 8, 2026	Outstanding Editing	Viridiana Lieberman	Won	
Cinema Eye Honors	January 8, 2026	Audience Choice Prize	The Perfect Neighbor	Longlisted	
Astra Awards	January 9, 2026	Best Documentary Feature	The Perfect Neighbor	Won	
Directors Guild of America Awards	February 7, 2026	Outstanding Directorial Achievement in Documentary	Geeta Gandbhir	Nominated	
Film Independent Spirit Awards	February 15, 2026	Best Documentary Feature	Geeta Gandbhir, Sam Bisbee, Nikon Kwantu, Alisa Payne	Won	
Producers Guild of America Awards	February 28, 2026	Best Documentary	Geeta Gandbhir, Sam Bisbee, Nikon Kwantu, Alisa Payne	Nominated	
Full Frame Documentary Film Festival	April 2025	Special Jury Award	The Perfect Neighbor	Won	
British Academy Film Awards	February 22, 2026	Best Documentary	Geeta Gandbhir, Sam Bisbee, Nikon Kwantu, Alisa Payne	Nominated	
Academy Awards	March 15, 2026	Best Documentary Feature	Geeta Gandbhir, Sam Bisbee, Nikon Kwantu, Alisa Payne	Nominated	
Peabody Awards	April 23, 2026	Documentary	The Perfect Neighbor	Nominated	

== See also ==
- Incident – 2023 documentary short film similar in content
- June 17th, 1994 – 2010 episode of 30 for 30 also similar in content
