= Where the Wind Comes From =

2025 comedy drama film by Amel Guellaty

- Promotional poster
- Directed by: Amel Guellaty
- Written by: Amel Guellaty
- Produced by: Asma Chiboub; Karim Aitouna
- Starring: Eya Bellagha; Slim Baccar
- Cinematography: Frida Marzouk
- Edited by: Amel Guellaty; Malek Kammoun; Ghalya Lacroix
- Music by: Omar Aloulou
- Production companies: Atlas Vision Productions; Haut les Mains Productions
- Distributed by: MAD Distribution (Middle East and North Africa)
- Release date: 26 January 2025 (Sundance)
- Running time: 100 minutes
- Countries: Tunisia; France; Qatar
- Language: Arabic

Where the Wind Comes From is a 2025 comedy drama film written and directed by Amel Guellaty. The film stars Eya Bellagha and Slim Baccar as friends who embark on a road trip to participate in an art contest. Asma Chiboub and Karim Aitouna produced the film through the studios Atlas Vision and Haut les Mains.

The film premiered at the 2025 Sundance Film Festival as part of the World Cinema Dramatic Competition category.

== Synopsis ==
Two lifelong friends living in Tunis, Alyssa and Mehdi, decide to take a road trip to Djerba to partake in an art contest that could help them start a new life in Europe. During their journey to the contest, their friendship is tested.

== Cast ==
- Eya Bellagha as Alyssa
- Slim Baccar as Mehdi
- Sondos Belhassen
- Lobna Noomene

== Production ==
Tunisian filmmaker Amel Guellaty wrote and directed Where the Wind Comes From, her first feature film following the shorts Black Mamba (2017) and Chitana (2021). Guellaty first conceived the idea for Where the Wind Comes From years before its production, before she made her prior two short films. The story is based on her experience growing up with primarily male friends.

Asma Chiboub of Atlas Vision Productions (Tunisia), who previously worked with Guellaty on Black Mamba, produced the film alongside Karim Aitouna of Haut les Mains Productions (France). Chadi Abo co-produced the movie.

== Release ==
In December 2024, the Egyptian company MAD Distribution acquired the Middle East and North Africa distribution rights for the movie. The film made its debut at the 2025 Sundance Film Festival on January 26 as part of the World Cinema Dramatic Competition.

It competed in Stockholm Competition of the 2025 Stockholm International Film Festival on November 7, 2025.
