= Born in Synanon =

- Directed by: Geeta Gandbhir
- Music by: Laura Heinzinger
- Country of origin: United States
- Original language: English
- No. of episodes: 4

Production
- Executive producers: Geeta Gandbhir; Cassidy Arkin; Jonathan K. Bendis; Jessica Cozzetta; Sandra Rogers-Hare; Terrence Wrong; Susan Zirinsky
- Producers: Jamie Schutz; Steven Cantor
- Cinematography: Terrance Redd Claiborne; Jerry Henry
- Editors: Anna Auster; Alex Keipper
- Running time: 55-58 minutes
- Production companies: Stick Figure Productions; See It Now Studios

Original release
- Network: Paramount+
- Release: December 12, 2023

Born in Synanon is an American documentary series directed and produced by Geeta Gandbhir. It follows Cassidy Arkin as she searches to learn the truth about Synanon, a group which developed into a cult.

It premiered on December 12, 2023, on Paramount+.

== Premise ==
Cassidy Arkin searches to learn the truth about Synanon, a group which she was raised in, as it developed into a cult.

== Episodes ==
No.	Title	Directed by	Original release date
1	"Individual Reality"	Geeta Gandbhir	December 12, 2023
2	"The People-Raising Business"	Geeta Gandbhir	December 12, 2023
3	"Great Flip of the Box"	Geeta Gandbhir	December 12, 2023
4	"End of Utopia"	Geeta Gandbhir	December 12, 2023

== Production ==
For over twenty years, Cassidy Arkin had been collecting materials and interviews regarding Synanon. Arkin later met Geeta Gandbhir and discussed her vision for a documentary series revolving around her growing up in Synanon. Gandbhir incorporated archival footage of the group, with long sequences of The Game.

== Reception ==
=== Critical reception ===
On the review aggregator website Rotten Tomatoes, 80% of 5 critics' reviews are positive.

Chris Vognar of Rolling Stone praised the series writing: "A thoughtful series that grows richer with each of its four episodes, Born in Synanon is as much a personal journey as a historical study, although it ultimately manages to be both." Joel Keller of Decider wrote: "Born In Synanon is unique among cult-related docuseries because it shows that not all cults start because of one person’s narcissism and messiah complex."

Conversely, in a negative review, Nick Schager of The Daily Beast wrote: "Born in Synanon's framework resonates from the get-go as counterfeit, and the same goes for its lovey-dovey snapshot of Synanon’s origins."
