= Apocalypse in the Tropics =

2024 documentary film

- Release poster
- Portuguese: Apocalipse nos Trópicos
- Directed by: Petra Costa
- Written by: Petra Costa; Alessandra Orofino; David Barker; Nels Bangerter; Tina Baz; Moara Passoni
- Produced by: Petra Costa; Alessandra Orofino
- Starring: Petra Costa; Luiz Inácio Lula da Silva; Jair Bolsonaro; Silas Malafaia
- Narrated by: Petra Costa
- Cinematography: João Atala; Murilo Salazar; Pedro Urano
- Edited by: Bruno Lasevicius; Cao Guimarães; David Barker; Eduardo Gripa; Jordana Berg; Nels Bangerter; Tina Baz; Victor Miaciro
- Music by: Rodrigo Leão
- Production companies: Busca Vida Filmes; Impact Partners; Play/Action Pictures; Luminate; Plan B Entertainment; KM Films; Peri Productions
- Distributed by: Netflix
- Release dates: 29 August 2024 (Venice); 11 July 2025 (United States); 14 July 2025 (Netflix)
- Running time: 109 minutes
- Countries: Brazil; United States; United Kingdom
- Languages: Portuguese; English

Apocalypse in the Tropics (Portuguese: Apocalipse nos Trópicos) is a 2024 documentary film directed by Petra Costa about the influence of evangelical Christianity on far-right politics in Brazil.

The film premiered out of competition at the 81st Venice International Film Festival, on 29 August 2024. It was given a limited release in the United States on 11 July 2025, prior to its global release on Netflix on 14 July 2025 and received widespread praise from critics

== Synopsis ==
The documentary follows the growing influence of the evangelical movement in Brazilian politics, specially during Jair Bolsonaro's tenure as President of Brazil. Costa gains unprecedented access to Bolsonaro's close associate: far-right televangelist Silas Malafaia. Malafaia's undeniable growing influence on Bolsonarism, since the COVID-19 pandemic in Brazil, is also a key part of the 2022 presidential elections results (which Bolsonaro was narrowly defeated) and the attempted coup d'état in the following months.

At the same time, Costa examines Bolsonaro's left-wing successor Luiz Inácio Lula da Silva (elected for an unprecedented third non-consecutive term) attempts to unify the religious discourse in a democratic instance.

== Release ==
Apocalypse in the Tropics debuted out of competition at the 81st Venice International Film Festival on 29 August 2024. It will also screen at the 51st Telluride Film Festival on 31 August 2024, in the Perlak section of the 72nd San Sebastián International Film Festival, and in the Spotlight section of the 2024 New York Film Festival.

In December 2024, Netflix acquired distribution rights to the film. It was limitedly released on 11 July 2025, prior to streaming on Netflix on 14 July 2025.

== Reception ==
=== Critical response ===
On the review aggregator website Rotten Tomatoes, 91% of 45 critics' reviews are positive, with an average rating of 7.8/10. The website's consensus reads: "A gripping and unsettling documentary, Apocalypse in the Tropics offers a sobering reflection on the dangerous erosion of democratic boundaries as religious extremism intertwines with political power." Metacritic, which uses a weighted average, assigned the film a score of 82 out of 100, based on 16 critics, indicating "universal acclaim".

Monica Castillo of RogerEbert.com gave the film three and a half out of four stars and wrote that it "looks and feels like a nightmare from the chilling visions from the Book of Revelations to news footage of crowds storming their seats of government, the breathtaking loss Brazil suffered during COVID, and the First Lady's frenetic display of praying in tongues."

Jordan Mintzer of The Hollywood Reporter wrote, "What makes Tropics so riveting is the way Costa constantly shifts between the epic and the intimate, the macro and the micro. She uses drones to film massive crowds of protestors like extras in a big-budget historical drama, then goes handheld to follow Bolsonaro, as well as re-elected leftist president Lula da Silva, as they contend with the religious players forcing them to embrace Christianity in public."

Valdinei Ferreira of Christianity Today gave a mixed review, writing that Costa's outsider perspective allowed her to approach the Brazilian evangelical movement "with curiosity rather than cynicism." However, he expressed concerns that her focus on prominent media and political figures such as Silas Malafaia led her to "risk portraying evangelicalism as monolithic, missing its theological diversity and the quieter, more grounded expressions of faith lived out in communities across Brazil." Ferreira expressed disagreement with Costa's reliance on Dominion theology as a framework for explaining the growing evangelical presence in Brazilian politics.

Silas Malafaia disliked the film. Invited to a special preview screening at a movie theater in Rio de Janeiro, the pastor left the venue, shouting against what he had seen.

=== Accolades ===
Award / Film Festival	Date of ceremony	Category	Recipient(s)	Result	Ref.
Critics' Choice Documentary Awards	9 November 2025	Best Documentary Feature	Apocalypse in the Tropics	Nominated	
Critics' Choice Documentary Awards	9 November 2025	Best Political Documentary	Apocalypse in the Tropics	Nominated	
Critics' Choice Documentary Awards	9 November 2025	Best Director	Petra Costa	Nominated	
Critics' Choice Documentary Awards	9 November 2025	Best Narration	Petra Costa	Nominated	
Cinema Eye Honors	8 January 2026	Outstanding Production	Petra Costa and Alessandra Orofino	Won	
Cinema Eye Honors	8 January 2026	Audience Choice Prize	Apocalypse in the Tropics	Nominated	
