= Critics Choice Documentary Award for Best Political Documentary =

The Best Political Documentary is one of the annual Critics' Choice Documentary Awards. It is given to the outstanding political documentary of the year.

== Winners and nominees ==
indicates the winner

=== 2010s ===
| Year | Film | Production companies | Ref. |
|---|---|---|---|
| 2016 (1st) | 13th | Netflix and Kandoo Films | |
| 2016 (1st) | Audrie & Daisy | Netflix and Actual Films | |
| 2016 (1st) | Newtown | Abramorama, Mile 22, and Independent Television Service | |
| 2016 (1st) | O.J.: Made in America | ESPN and Laylow Films | |
| 2016 (1st) | Weiner | Sundance Selects, Motto Pictures, and Edgeline Films | |
| 2016 (1st) | Zero Days | Magnolia, Jigsaw Productions, and Participant Media | |
| 2017 (2nd) | Abacus: Small Enough to Jail | PBS, Blue Ice Films, Mitten Media, Motto Pictures, and Kartemquin Films Production | |
| 2017 (2nd) | 11/8/16 | The Orchard and Cinetic Media | |
| 2017 (2nd) | An Inconvenient Sequel: Truth to Power | Paramount, Actual Films, and Participant Media | |
| 2017 (2nd) | City of Ghosts | Amazon Studios, A&E IndieFilms, IFC Films, and Our Time Projects | |
| 2017 (2nd) | Dolores | PBS Distribution and 5 Stick Films | |
| 2017 (2nd) | The Reagan Show | Gravitas Ventures and CNN Films | |
| 2018 (3rd) | RBG | Magnolia Pictures and Participant Media | |
| 2018 (3rd) | Dark Money | PBS | |
| 2018 (3rd) | Fahrenheit 11/9 | Briarcliff Entertainment | |
| 2018 (3rd) | Flint Town | Netflix | |
| 2018 (3rd) | The Fourth Estate | Showtime Networks | |
| 2018 (3rd) | Hitler's Hollywood | Kino Lorber | |
| 2018 (3rd) | John McCain: For Whom the Bell Tolls | HBO | |
| 2019 (4th) | American Factory | Netflix | |
| 2019 (4th) | The Edge of Democracy | Netflix | |
| 2019 (4th) | Hail Satan? | Magnolia Pictures | |
| 2019 (4th) | The Kingmaker | Showtime | |
| 2019 (4th) | Knock Down the House | Netflix | |
| 2019 (4th) | One Child Nation | Amazon Studios | |

=== 2020s ===
| Year | Film | Production companies | Ref. |
|---|---|---|---|
| 2020 (5th) | Boys State | Apple TV+ | |
| 2020 (5th) | All In: The Fight for Democracy | Amazon Studios | |
| 2020 (5th) | John Lewis: Good Trouble | Magnolia Pictures | |
| 2020 (5th) | MLK/FBI | Field of Vision and IFC Films | |
| 2020 (5th) | The Social Dilemma | Netflix | |
| 2020 (5th) | Totally Under Control | Neon | |
| 2020 (5th) | The Way I See It | Focus Features | |
| 2021 (6th) | The Crime of the Century | HBO Documentary Films | |
| 2021 (6th) | Enemies of the State | IFC Films | |
| 2021 (6th) | Four Hours at the Capitol | HBO Documentary Films | |
| 2021 (6th) | Influence | StoryScope and EyeSteelFilm | |
| 2021 (6th) | Mayor Pete | Amazon Studios | |
| 2021 (6th) | Missing in Brooks County | Giant Pictures | |
| 2021 (6th) | Nasrin | Hulu | |
| 2021 (6th) | Not Going Quietly | Greenwich Entertainment | |
| 2022 (7th) | Navalny | HBO, CNN, and Warner Bros. Pictures | |
| 2022 (7th) | Aftershock | Hulu | |
| 2022 (7th) | All the Beauty and the Bloodshed | HBO and Neon | |
| 2022 (7th) | Gabby Giffords Won't Back Down | Briarcliff Entertainment | |
| 2022 (7th) | The Janes | HBO | |
| 2022 (7th) | Retrograde | National Geographic Documentary Films | |
| 2022 (7th) | Freedom on Fire: Ukraine's Fight for Freedom | Netflix | |
| 2023 (8th) | 20 Days in Mariupol | PBS | |
| 2023 (8th) | Beyond Utopia | Roadside Attractions | |
| 2023 (8th) | Bobi Wine: The People's President | National Geographic | |
| 2023 (8th) | Deadlocked: How America Shaped the Supreme Court | Showtime | |
| 2023 (8th) | Every Body | Focus Features | |
| 2023 (8th) | Lakota Nation vs. United States | IFC Films | |
| 2023 (8th) | Silver Dollar Road | Amazon MGM Studios | |
| 2024 (9th) | Sugarcane | National Geographic | |
| 2024 (9th) | Bad River | 50 Eggs Films | |
| 2024 (9th) | Girls State | Apple TV+ | |
| 2024 (9th) | Porcelain War | Picturehouse | |
| 2024 (9th) | Stopping the Steal | HBO/Max | |
| 2024 (9th) | The Truth vs. Alex Jones | HBO/Max | |
| 2025 (10th) | The Alabama Solution | HBO Max | |
| 2025 (10th) | Apocalypse in the Tropics | Netflix | |
| 2025 (10th) | Deaf President Now! | Apple TV+ | |
| 2025 (10th) | The Librarians | Independent Lens | |
| 2025 (10th) | My Undesirable Friends: Part I — Last Air in Moscow | Marminchilla | |
| 2025 (10th) | Orwell: 2+2=5 | Neon | |
