= The Devil Is Busy =

2024 documentary short film by Geeta Gandbhir and Christalyn Hampton

- Promotional poster
- Directed by: Geeta Gandbhir; Christalyn Hampton
- Produced by: Christalyn Hampton; Amber Fares
- Cinematography: Amber Fares; Mikenzie Lewis
- Edited by: Tristan Nash
- Production companies: Soledad O'Brien Productions; Message Pictures; HBO Documentary Films
- Distributed by: HBO Max
- Release date: November 14, 2024 (Doc NYC)
- Running time: 31 minutes
- Country: United States
- Language: English

The Devil Is Busy is a 2024 American documentary short film, directed by Geeta Gandbhir and Christalyn Hampton, which follows an Atlanta abortion clinic besieged by protesters.

Following its November 14, 2024 world premiere at Doc NYC, producer HBO Documentary Films released the film for streaming on September 23, 2025. At the 98th Academy Awards, it was nominated for the Best Documentary Short Film.

== Synopsis ==
The film follows Tracii, the head of security at a women’s healthcare clinic in Atlanta, over the course of a single day. As new legal restrictions and constant protests surround the clinic, Tracii works to protect patients seeking abortions and other medical services, including routine checkups and preventive care.

Shot in a cinéma vérité style, the documentary shows the daily safety measures taken by Tracii and the staff, such as checking the building for intruders, coordinating with security guards who escort patients, and using numbered systems to keep identities private. Tracii also shares her own background, supports nervous patients, and deals with protestors who gather outside.

The film offers a direct look at the changing conditions for reproductive healthcare in the United States after the overturning of Roe v. Wade, highlighting the challenges faced by clinics and the people who work to keep patients safe.

== Release ==
The Devil Is Busy was presented at the 40th Santa Barbara International Film Festival on February 9, 2025, and in Featurette Documentary at the Pan African Film Festival on February 13, 2025. It was also screened in the Documentary Shorts 3 at the Sedona International Film Festival on February 27, 2025. It was presented in the Shorts 2 at the Full Frame Documentary Film Festival on April 4, 2025, and presented as Part of Documentary Shorts 2025: Program 1 at the RiverRun International Film Festival on April 13, 2025. The next day it was screened at the Florida Film Festival on April 14, 2025.

On May 2, 2025 it was screened at the Atlanta Film Festival in Documentary Short section, and on June 3 at the Brooklyn Film Festival in Documentary Short section.

The film was presented in the Live Shorts section of the 2025 Palm Springs International Festival of Short Films in June 2025,

It had its Philadelphia premiere on August 3, 2025 at the BlackStar Film Festival in Short Documentary.

It was made available to stream on HBO Max on September 23, 2025.

It was presented at the Hot Springs Documentary Film Festival in documentary shorts on October 15, 2025

== Accolades ==
Award	Date of ceremony	Category	Recipient(s)	Result	Ref.
Palm Springs International Festival of Short Films	June 29, 2025	Local Jury Awards: Special Mention	The Devil Is Busy	Won	
Palm Springs International Festival of Short Films	June 29, 2025	Audience Award: Best Documentary Short	The Devil Is Busy	Won	
Critics' Choice Documentary Awards	November 9, 2025	Best Short Documentary	The Devil Is Busy	Nominated	
Cinema Eye Honors	January 8, 2026	Outstanding Non-Fiction Short	The Devil Is Busy	Shortlisted	
Academy Awards	March 15, 2026	Best Documentary Short Film	Geeta Gandbhir, Christalyn Hampton	Nominated	

== See also ==
- Academy Award for Best Documentary Short Film
- Submissions for Best Documentary Short Academy Award
