= Mama Micra =

2024 animated film by Rebecca Blöcher

- Directed by: Rebecca Blöcher
- Written by: Rebecca Blöcher; Frédéric Schuld
- Produced by: Fabian Driehorst
- Cinematography: Frédéric Schuld
- Music by: Christian Goretzky; Alexander Müller-Welt
- Animation by: Rebecca Blöcher; Sophie Bach
- Production companies: Fabian&Fred
- Distributed by: Interfilm Berlin; ZDF, 3sat
- Release date: 15 November 2024 (IDFA Amsterdam)
- Running time: 24 minutes
- Country: Germany
- Language: German

Mama Micra is a 2024 German animated documentary short film directed by Rebecca Blöcher, co-directed by Frédéric Schuld made as a hybrid with archive material as well as Stop Motion and 2D Animation.

Mama Micra had its world premiere on November 15, 2024 at International Documentary Film Festival Amsterdam (IDFA), Netherlands.

== Summary ==
The film follows the life of filmmaker Rebecca Blöcher's mother. The film depicts her mother living in a variety of locations, including palaces and under bridges. Her mother values her independence greatly which leads to significant challenges, including living in her car for 10 years. Only when the car breaks down, and she was unable to walk, does she re-connect with her daughter.

== Production ==
In this film, Rebecca Blöcher explores her relationship with her mother, who had lived in a small car for years. For her mother, the ability to drive from one place to another was the epitome of freedom which, however, also led to a separation from her family. The interview developed into a very personal conversation between arguments and laughter. They talked for a week, and they both learned to overcome conflicts that had developed over the years.

Shortly afterwards, her mother died. While clearing out her belongings, Blöcher found numerous photo albums and letters that confirmed her mother's stories. She then began production of the film by recreating a world out of felt in combination with the photos she had found.

Mama Micra has been produced by the Hamburg based production studio Fabian&Fred. The research for the film was funded through the Bremer Documentary Funding Award, whilst the production has been funded by MOIN Film Fund Hamburg Schleswig-Holstein, the Ministry of State for Culture and the Media and the German Federal Film Board FFA. It has been distributed Interfilm Berlin.

== Release ==
Mama Micra had its world premiere on November 15, 2024 at International Documentary Film Festival Amsterdam (IDFA), Netherlands. Since then, it has been touring on documentary festivals all over the world like DC/DOX, Hong Kong International Film Festival or Kraków Film Festival.

Mama Micra has been rated as "Particularly valuable" by the German Film Rating Board FBW.

The film will be showcased at DCTV on November 30, 2025 in New York and at Vidiots on December 6, 2025 in Los Angeles.

== Accolades ==
Award	Date of ceremony	Category	Result	Ref.
International Documentary Film Festival Amsterdam (IDFA)	November 21, 2024	Special Mention of Short Documentary Competition	Won	
Full Frame Documentary Film Festival	April 6, 2025	The Franklin Humanities Institute Award	Won	
Docudays UA International Documentary Human Rights Film Festival	June 12, 2025	Special Mention of DOCU/SHORT Competition	Won	
German Short Film Award	November 20, 2025	Best Animated Short Film	Nominated	
IDA Documentary Awards	December 6, 2025	Best Short Documentary	Nominated	
Cinema Eye Honors	January 8, 2026	Outstanding Non-Fiction Short	Shortlisted	
