= Art for Everybody =

2023 documentary film

- Film poster
- Directed by: Miranda Yousef
- Produced by: Morgan Neville; Tim Rummel
- Cinematography: Jon Salmon; Tasha Van Zandt; Sebastian Zeck
- Edited by: Miranda Yousef
- Production company: Tremolo Productions
- Distributed by: Fourth Act Film
- Release date: March 13, 2023 (SXSW)
- Country: United States
- Language: English

Art for Everybody is a 2023 American documentary film about the life of artist Thomas Kinkade. It was directed by Miranda Yousef.

It includes coverage of his unpublished work, which "experiments with forms and styles and frequently depict[ed] the darkness that lurked inside of him. In several images, dark brooding figures rendered in charcoal seem haunted[.]" The documentary was said to "complicate the [Kinkade] narrative."

== Reception ==
=== Critical response ===
On the review aggregator website Rotten Tomatoes, 100% of 24 critics' reviews are positive, with an average rating of 8/10. Metacritic, which uses a weighted average, assigned the film a score of 81 out of 100, based on six critics, indicating "universal acclaim".

Peter Debruge of Variety wrote, "Much like Penny Lane's endlessly amusing Listening to Kenny G, Yousef's illuminating doc appeals to all sides, from Kinkade's haters to his most ardent defenders, revealing dimensions altogether absent from his enormously popular oeuvre."

Matt Zoller Seitz of RogerEbert.com gave the film three and a half out of four stars, writing, "This is a fascinating documentary about a family discovering the depth and complexity of their patriarch while coming to terms with his flaws, as well as the capitalist system of art exhibition and sale that has different tiers and gatekeepers, depending on who you are, and your version of life."

=== Accolades ===
In 2024, the film won the Audience Award for Best Documentary Feature at Hell's Half Mile Film & Music Festival. It was nominated for Best First Documentary Feature at the 10th Critics' Choice Documentary Awards.
