= Come See Me in the Good Light =

2025 documentary film by Ryan White

- Film poster
- Directed by: Ryan White
- Produced by: Jessica Hargrave; Tig Notaro; Ryan White; Stef Willen
- Starring: Andrea Gibson; Megan Falley
- Cinematography: Brandon Somerhalder
- Edited by: Berenice Chavez
- Music by: Blake Neely
- Production companies: Amplify Pictures; Tripod Media
- Distributed by: Apple TV+
- Release dates: January 25, 2025 (Sundance); November 14, 2025 (Apple TV+)
- Running time: 104 minutes
- Country: United States
- Language: English

Come See Me in the Good Light is a 2025 American documentary film directed by Ryan White. Retracing the life of American poet and activist Andrea Gibson, the film premiered at the Sundance Film Festival on January 25, 2025, where it received positive reviews from critics and won the Festival Favorite Award.

The documentary was critically acclaimed, being included on the National Board of Review Top 5 Documentaries of 2025, receiving several awards and nominations including the Academy Awards, Satellite Awards and Film Independent Spirit Awards. American singer-songwriters Sara Bareilles and Brandi Carlile wrote and performed the original song "Salt Then Sour Then Sweet".

== Plot ==
American poet and activist Andrea Gibson shares their life story, starting from their childhood, describing their early struggles with identity and trauma from family and their awareness of their sexual identity. Gibson also explained how poetry intertwines personal pain and how it helps spread their messages about the LGBTQ community and human and political inequalities. Gibson also addresses the theme of love with their wife Megan Falley, with whom they recount the drama of their battle with terminal ovarian cancer diagnosed in 2021.

== Production ==
The documentary was conceived by American comedian Tig Notaro and producer Stef Willen, both longtime friends of Gibson and Falley, who contacted Jessica Hargrave and Ryan White. It was filmed in the couple's house in Longmont, Colorado, between January 2024 to December 2024, accompanying Gibson through the process of treatment and care for the ovarian cancer diagnosed in July 2021. Singer-songwriters Sara Bareilles and Brandi Carlile serve as among the executive producers; they co-wrote a song for the documentary, "Salt Then Sour Then Sweet", with Gibson.

== Release ==
It had its world premiere at the 2025 Sundance Film Festival. In April 2025, Apple TV+ acquired distribution rights to the film, scheduled for fall release. Although Gibson lived to attend the Sundance premiere, they died from their cancer on July 14, 2025, before the film aired more widely.

The film was released on November 14, 2025, on Apple TV+.

== Reception ==
=== Critical response ===
On the review aggregator website Rotten Tomatoes, 100% of 54 critics' reviews are positive, with an average rating of 7.3/10. The website's consensus reads: "Come See Me in the Good Light is an emotionally searing yet gently radiant portrait of Andrea Gibson and Megan Falley's navigation of terminal illness that never loses sight of the warmth, humor, and love that defined their relationship." Metacritic, which uses a weighted average, assigned the film a score of 81 out of 100, based on 12 critics, indicating "universal acclaim".

Barry Levitt of Time described the film as "a gateway into their remarkable artistry" because "it is accessible, yet profound, and it's easy to understand how those who might not count themselves as poetry fanatics would fall in love with their poems", and that " the documentary arrives at a time of great political unrest, with the queer community under threat in America". In a four out of five review, Adrian Horton of The Guardian praising the "way in which the director "constructs a delicate portrait of the poet, collaging readings of their most poignant poems".

=== Accolades ===
Award	Year	Category	Recipient(s)	Result	Ref.
Academy Awards	2026	Best Documentary Feature Film	Come See Me in the Good Light	Nominated	
Austin Film Critics Association	2025	Best Documentary Film	Come See Me in the Good Light	Nominated	
Boulder International Film Festival	2025	Peoples Choice Award - Feature Length Film	Ryan White, Jessica Hargrave, Tig Notaro, Stef Willen	Won	
Boulder International Film Festival	2025	Best Feature Documentary	Ryan White, Jessica Hargrave, Tig Notaro, Stef Willen	Won	
Cinema Eye Honors	2026	Outstanding Feature	Come See Me in the Good Light	Won	
Cinema Eye Honors	2026	Original Music Score	Blake Neely	Won	
Cinema Eye Honors	2026	Unforgettables Honors	Andrea Gibson and Megan Falley	Won	
Cinema Eye Honors	2026	Direction	Ryan White	Nominated	
Cinema Eye Honors	2026	Cinematography	Brandon Somerhalder	Nominated	
Cinema Eye Honors	2026	Audience Choice Prize	Come See Me in the Good Light	Nominated	
Cleveland International Film Festival	2025	Roxanne T. Mueller Audience Choice Award for Best Film	Come See Me in the Good Light	Won	
Cleveland International Film Festival	2025	Best Documentary	Come See Me in the Good Light	Nominated	
Cleveland International Film Festival	2025	Honorable Mention – Documentary Competition	Ryan White	Won	
Dallas–Fort Worth Film Critics Association	2025	Best Documentary	Come See Me in the Good Light	Nominated	
GLAAD Media Awards	2026	Outstanding Documentary	Come See Me in the Good Light	Won	
Hot Docs Canadian International Documentary Festival	2025	Audience Award	Come See Me in the Good Light	Won	
Independent Spirit Awards	2026	Best Documentary Feature	Come See Me in the Good Light	Nominated	
International Documentary Association	2025	Honorable Mention in Feature Documentaries	Come See Me in the Good Light	Nominated	
National Board of Review Awards	2025	Top 5 Documentaries	Come See Me in the Good Light	3rd Place	
San Francisco International Film Festival	2025	Best Documentary Feature	Come See Me in the Good Light	Won	
Satellite Awards	2026	Best Documentary Film	Come See Me in the Good Light	Nominated	
Society of Composers & Lyricists Awards	2026	Outstanding Original Song for a Dramatic or Documentary Visual Media Production	"Salt Then Sour Then Sweet" (Sara Bareilles, Brandi Carlile and Andrea Gibson)	Nominated	
Sundance Film Festival	2026	Festival Favorite Award	Ryan White, Jessica Hargrave, Tig Notaro, Stef Willen	Won	
Toronto Film Critics Association	2026	Allan King Documentary Award	Ryan White	Won	
Virginia Film Festival	2025	Audience Award – Documentary Feature	Come See Me in the Good Light	Won	
Virginia Film Festival	2025	Chronicler Award	Jessica Hargrave	Won	
Washington DC Area Film Critics Association Awards	2025	Best Documentary	Come See Me in the Good Light	Nominated	
