= Deaf President Now! =

2025 American documentary film

- Release poster
- Directed by: Nyle DiMarco; Davis Guggenheim
- Produced by: Nyle DiMarco; Davis Guggenheim; Amanda Rohlke; Jonathan King; Michael Harte
- Cinematography: Jonathan Furmanski
- Edited by: Michael Harte
- Music by: Marco Beltrami; Buck Sanders
- Production company: Concordia Studio
- Distributed by: Apple Original Films
- Release dates: January 28, 2025 (Sundance); May 16, 2025 (United States)
- Running time: 101 minutes
- Country: United States
- Languages: English; American Sign Language

Deaf President Now! is a 2025 American documentary film, directed and produced by Nyle DiMarco and Davis Guggenheim. It follows the 1988 student protest at Gallaudet University, when a hearing candidate was elected over other deaf candidates.

It had its world premiere at the Sundance Film Festival on January 28, 2025, and was released on May 16, 2025, by Apple Original Films.

== Premise ==
Follows the 1988 student protest at Gallaudet University, a university for the education of the deaf and hard of hearing people, when a hearing candidate was elected over other deaf candidates. Bridgetta Bourne-Firl, Jerry Covell, Greg Hlibok, Tim Rarus and I. King Jordan appear in the film.

== Production ==
In December 2024, it was announced Nyle DiMarco and Davis Guggenheim had directed a documentary revolving around Deaf President Now for Apple Original Films.

== Release ==
It had its world premiere at the Sundance Film Festival on January 28, 2025. It also screened at the South by Southwest Film & TV Festival on March 11, 2025. It was released on May 16, 2025.

== Reception ==
=== Critical reception ===
On the review aggregator website Rotten Tomatoes, 100% of 47 critics' reviews are positive. The website's consensus reads: "Deftly chronicling a pivotal flashpoint in deaf community activism while skillfully folding inclusivity into its style, Deaf President Now! is a documentary that heartens as much as it informs." Metacritic, which uses a weighted average, assigned the film a score of 82 out of 100, based on 10 critics, indicating "universal acclaim".

Daniel Fienberg of The Hollywood Reporter wrote, "A fine entry in the generally prolific 'Birth of a Movement' documentary genre, Deaf President Now! illustrates what is and was distinctive about the Deaf rights movement, but also the elements that connect it to many recent campaigns for visibility and recognition."

Matt Zoller Seitz of RogerEbert.com gave the film four out of four stars and wrote, "Roger Ebert famously described cinema as a machine that generates empathy. This movie is that machine: a relentless engine fed by idealism and craft."

=== Accolades ===
The film was nominated for Outstanding Directing for a Documentary/Nonfiction Program and Outstanding Documentary or Nonfiction Special at the 77th Primetime Creative Arts Emmy Awards. It was nominated for Best Documentary Feature, Best Director, Best Political Documentary, and Best Editing at the 10th Critics' Choice Documentary Awards.
