= Orwell: 2+2=5 =

2025 French-American documentary film

- American theatrical release poster
- Directed by: Raoul Peck
- Written by: Raoul Peck
- Produced by: George Chignell; Alex Gibney; Raoul Peck; Nick Shumaker
- Narrated by: Damian Lewis
- Cinematography: Benjamin Bloodwell; Stuart Luck; Julian Schwanitz
- Edited by: Alexandra Strauss
- Music by: Alexei Aigui
- Production companies: Velvet Film; Jigsaw Productions; Universal Pictures Content Group
- Distributed by: Le Pacte (France); Neon (United States)
- Release dates: 17 May 2025 (Cannes); 3 October 2025 (United States); 25 February 2026 (France)
- Running time: 119 minutes
- Countries: France; United States
- Languages: English; Russian; Burmese; Arabic; French; Spanish
- Box office: $355,288

Orwell: 2+2=5 is a 2025 documentary film produced, written, and directed by Raoul Peck. It follows the career of George Orwell, particularly the lessons from his 1949 novel Nineteen Eighty-Four, and how his political observations are still relevant in present day authoritarianism. Damian Lewis narrates the film as Orwell.

The documentary had its world premiere at the Cannes Premiere section of the 2025 Cannes Film Festival on 17 May 2025, where it was nominated for the L'Œil d'or. It was theatrically released in the United States by Neon on 3 October 2025, and was released in France by Le Pacte on 25 February 2026. It received positive reviews from critics.

== Plot ==
Through archive photos, newsreels, films, contemporary documentaries, and notorious speeches, Raoul Peck investigates how early 20th century authoritarianism still echoes in contemporary life, especially during ongoing conflicts threatening democracy and public liberties, such as the Myanmar civil war, the Russo-Ukrainian war, the United States' War on terror and the January 6 Capitol attack, the Gaza War, and many others.

== Production ==
In March 2023, it was announced Raoul Peck would direct a documentary revolving around George Orwell, with the cooperation of the Orwell Estate. It was further announced that filmmaker Alex Gibney would produce under his Jigsaw Productions banner, alongside Anonymous Content, Closer Media, Participant and Universal Pictures Content Group, and Neon to distribute.

The film, like Peck's previous projects, utilizes archival footage, excerpts from a wide range of other films, and the author's own personal letters and journals.

== Release ==
On 17 May 2025, Orwell: 2+2=5 had its world premiere in the Cannes Premiere section at the Cannes Film Festival. On 17 August 2025, the film was also showcased at the 53rd Norwegian International Film Festival in Main Programme section. On 3 October 2025, the film was released worldwide. On 8 November 2025, the film competed in Stockholm Documentary Competition of the 2025 Stockholm International Film Festival.

== Reception ==
=== Critical response ===
On the review aggregator website Rotten Tomatoes, 84% of 85 critics' reviews are positive, with an average rating of 7.3/10. The website's consensus reads: "Orwell: 2 + 2 = 5 is a dense, urgent, and unapologetically blunt documentary that offers a chillingly relevant examination of totalitarianism's enduring appeal and the societal conditions that enable it." Metacritic, which uses a weighted average, assigned the film a score of 69 out of 100, based on 20 critics, indicating "generally favorable" reviews.

Sheri Linden of The Hollywood Reporter wrote: "George Orwell himself has gone in and out of favor over the revisionist years, but the British author's searing insights into empire and power and totalitarianism have never lost relevance. That's particularly true of his final work, the dystopian premonition 1984. Published 76 years ago, the novel is the core of Raoul Peck's documentary portrait of the writer. With a dynamic mix of biography and intellectual essence, and with the re-election of Donald Trump the obvious inflection point for its urgency, Orwell: 2+2=5 delves into the ways Orwell's arguments illuminate a century's worth of geopolitics."

Matthew Carey of Deadline wrote that the film: "...makes it startlingly clear the degree to which we are living in Orwellian times. The parallels between the nightmare of 1984, where Big Brother dictates every facet of life, and Donald Trump's America have not been properly acknowledged. This film does that....Orwell: 2 + 2 = 5 is an urgent, indispensable film for our times." Robert Daniels of RogerEbert.com, on the other hand, stated that the director: "...struggles to focus on specific themes, overloading the film by making as many links as possible." Jonathan Romney of Screen International called it a "breathless attempt to balance the varying demands of biography, exegesis and polemic, somewhat tripping itself in the process".

=== Accolades ===
Orwell: 2+2=5 won Best Score and Best Narration and was nominated for Best Documentary Feature, Best Director, Best Editing, Best Archival Documentary, and Best Political Documentary at the 10th Critics' Choice Documentary Awards. The film received a nomination for Best Documentary Feature at the 9th Astra Film Awards.
