= Killing of Ajike Owens =

2023 shooting in Ocala, Florida, US

Coordinates: 29.06471°N 82.15380°W

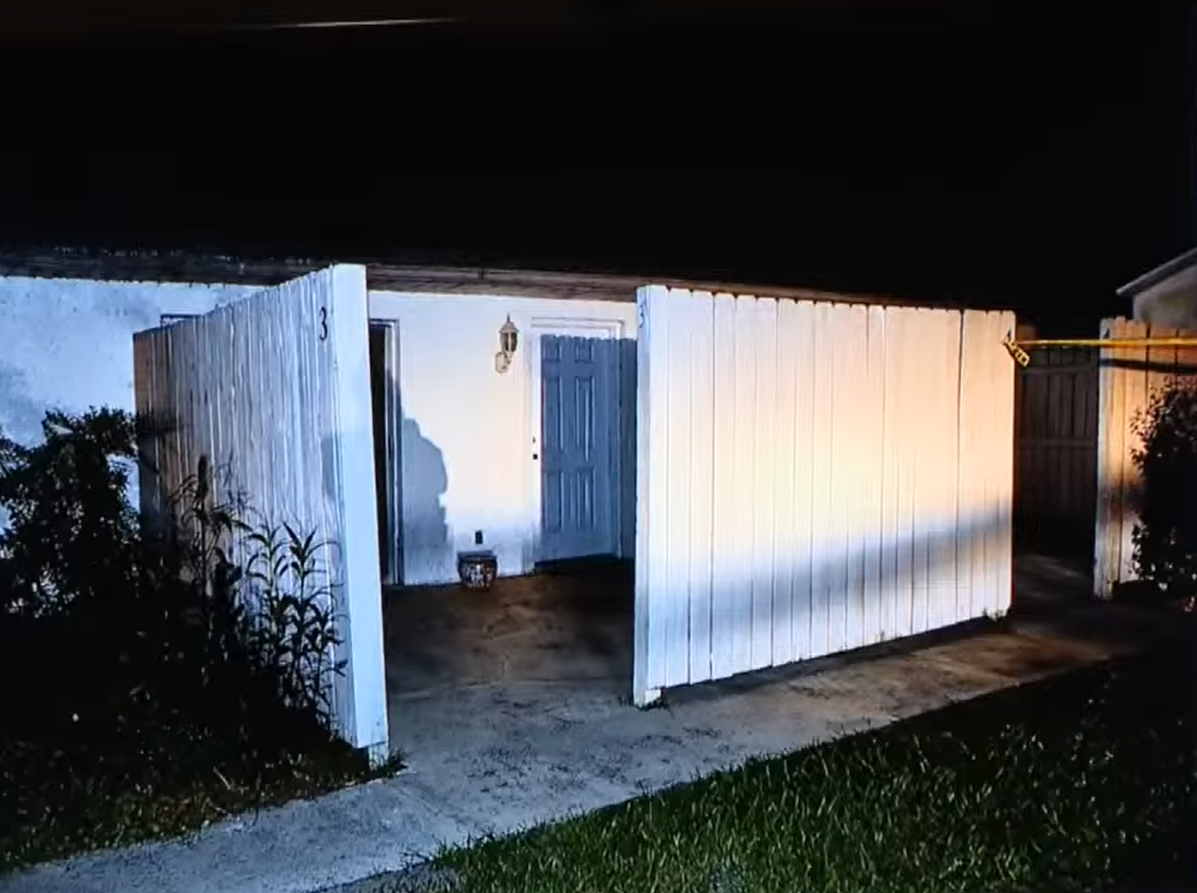
- Location of the shooting
- Location: Ocala, Florida, U.S.
- Date: June 2, 2023 c. 9:00 p.m. (EDT)
- Attack type: Homicide by shooting
- Weapon: .380 ACP caliber handgun
- Victim: Ajike "A.J." Owens
- Perpetrator: Susan Louise Lorincz
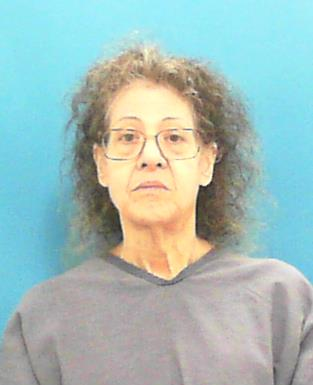
- Mugshot of Lorincz in 2024
- Motive: Resentment and anger toward Owens and her children
- Verdict: Guilty
- Sentence: 25 years imprisonment

On June 2, 2023, in Ocala, Florida, 35-year-old Ajike "A.J." Shantrell Owens was shot and killed by her neighbor, 58-year-old Susan Louise Lorincz. Owens had gone to Lorincz's door after an altercation between her children and Lorincz in a grassy area nearby. While Owens stood outside the windowless front door, Lorincz fired a single shot through it, striking Owens in the chest.

Deputies from the Marion County Sheriff's Office were already en route to the residence in response to a report of "trespassing" when a second 911 call reported gunfire. Upon arrival, officers found Owens on the ground suffering from a gunshot wound. She was transported to a local hospital, where she was pronounced dead shortly after arrival.

The shooting drew national attention, igniting renewed debate over Florida's stand-your-ground law and the intersection of race, self-defense, and neighborhood disputes. Civil rights advocates, including attorney Benjamin Crump, argued that Owens's killing underscored systemic bias in how such laws are applied; Crump publicly called for Lorincz's arrest in the days following the killing.

Lorincz was arrested on June 6, 2023, and charged with manslaughter with a firearm, culpable negligence, battery, and two counts of assault. During interrogation, she claimed she acted in fear for her safety, though investigators later stated that forensic evidence contradicted elements of her account. In August 2024, following a week-long trial in Marion County Circuit Court, Lorincz was found guilty of manslaughter with a firearm. She was sentenced to 25 years in prison that November. In 2025, the case became the subject of the documentary film The Perfect Neighbor.

== Background ==
Since January 2021, deputies from the Marion County Sheriff's Office had responded to about six documented calls involving Lorincz and Owens's household. The central friction was Owens's children playing in a grassy area adjacent to Lorincz's apartment in Ocala, Florida, a space that Lorincz reportedly claimed as her own.

A neighbor living across from Lorincz described her as "angry all of the time" about the children's presence. They said Lorincz would verbally harass the children, often shouting "nasty things" when they were playing nearby. Judge Robert Hodges noted Lorincz's history of sexual abuse and being "raised in a household with a history of mental illness and addiction", but did not accept it was a mitigating factor in sentencing.

According to an arrest affidavit and law-enforcement records, Lorincz admitted to using racial slurs toward Owens's children—in particular, calling them the "n-word" and referring to them as "Black slaves".

The pattern described by the sheriff's office included not just loud play or sibling disputes, but also physical gestures and retaliatory acts. On the night of the shooting, investigators said Lorincz threw a pair of roller skates at Owens's ten-year-old son, striking him in the foot, and may have swung an umbrella at another child playing in the shared outdoor space.

Deputies had responded to Lorincz's own frequent calls to law enforcement, often alleging trespass or harassment. Records show that only a minute before the shooting, she had just gotten off a call to 911 saying she felt threatened by the children and their behavior. Moments after that call, another call reported the shooting.

Owens' mother, Pamela Dias, later told reporters, "When does a person get shot for knocking on a door?"

== Shooting ==
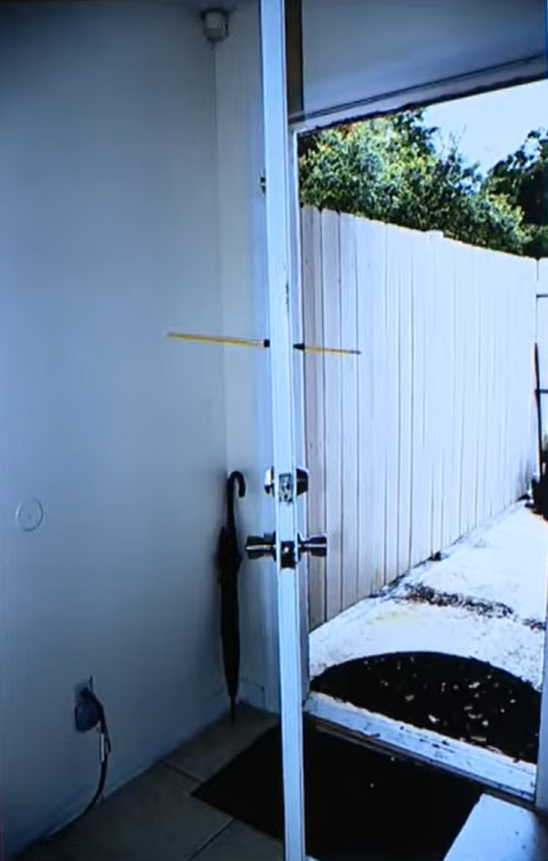
Crime scene photograph showing the bullet's trajectory through the door

At approximately 9:01 p.m. on June 2, 2023, deputies from the Marion County Sheriff's Office were already en route to a residence in Ocala in response to a report of "trespassing" when a second 911 call reported gunfire. Upon arrival, officers found 35-year-old Ajike "A.J." Owens lying on the ground outside the residence with a single .380 ACP caliber gunshot wound to her chest. She was transported to a local hospital, where she was pronounced dead shortly after arrival.

According to investigators and witness interviews, Owens had approached the front door of 58-year-old Susan Lorincz moments before the shooting. Detectives said Owens knocked several times, calling out for Lorincz to come outside. Lorincz then fired a single bullet through the closed, locked, metal door, striking Owens at close range while her ten-year-old son stood beside her.

In interviews with law enforcement, Lorincz claimed she acted in self-defense, alleging that Owens had been "pounding aggressively" on her door and that she feared the door would be forced open. However, detectives stated that physical evidence and eyewitness accounts did not support Lorincz's version of events. The investigation found no indication that Owens had attempted to enter the apartment or posed an imminent threat when she was shot.

Neighbors across the street told reporters they heard a single gunshot followed by screams. One resident ran outside after hearing a child yell, "They shot my mama!" and began administering CPR until emergency responders arrived.

Officials later confirmed that Lorincz had placed two emergency calls that evening: the first to report what she described as "trespassing", and the second immediately after the shooting. Both calls were logged within two minutes of one another. By the time deputies reached the scene, Owens was already unresponsive.

== Legal ==
The case drew national attention and reignited public debate over Florida's stand-your-ground laws, which allow individuals to use deadly force if they reasonably believe it necessary to prevent death or great bodily harm.

In the days following the shooting, civil rights attorney Benjamin Crump argued that Owens's killing underscored systemic bias in how such laws are applied; Crump publicly called for Lorincz's arrest, describing the incident as "an unconscionable killing of a mother who simply knocked on a door." Marion County Sheriff Billy Woods stated that his department was evaluating the state's "stand your ground" statute before making an arrest. Speaking to reporters on June 5, 2023, he noted that investigators had initially only heard from Susan Lorincz and were still attempting to interview witnesses, including Ajike Owens's children.

The following day, approximately 30 protesters gathered outside the Marion County Judicial Center demanding Lorincz's arrest. State Attorney William Gladson met briefly with the group, urging patience and explaining that investigators were still processing physical evidence, digital records, and eyewitness statements to ensure the case was not compromised.

After completing interviews and reviewing video and forensic evidence, deputies arrested Lorincz on June 6, 2023. She was charged with manslaughter with a firearm, culpable negligence, battery, and two counts of assault.

At a press conference following the arrest, Sheriff Woods clarified that the "stand your ground" law did not justify firing through a locked door, saying, "This situation is a prime example of when it was not justified. It was simply a killing."

On August 16, 2024, after a two-hour deliberation, an all-white, six-person jury found Lorincz guilty of manslaughter. Prosecutors argued that her actions demonstrated "depraved disregard for human life" and that no credible evidence supported a claim of self-defense.

Lorincz was sentenced to 25 years in prison on November 25, 2024. The sentencing judge cited the "indiscriminate nature" of her actions and the trauma inflicted on Owens's children, who witnessed the aftermath of their mother's killing. As of October 2025, Lorincz is serving her sentence at the Homestead Correctional Institution in Homestead, Florida.

In 2025, the Owens family filed a wrongful death lawsuit against Lorincz. Lorincz wrote a letter stating that she intends to countersue with dignitary tort claims of slander, libel, and defamation of character.

== Aftermath ==
The killing of Owens and subsequent trial of Lorincz intensified national debate over Florida's stand-your-ground statute and its broader social implications. Civil rights advocates and Owens's family called for legislative reform, arguing that the statute's language enables misinterpretation and promotes a "shoot first, think later" culture among some gun owners.

A law professor at William & Mary Law School expressed concern that the self-defense principle had been distorted from its original intent, saying it had "mutated into a shoot-first belief rather than a last-resort protection". Her comments echoed a growing national conversation about racial bias and uneven legal protections under the statute.

Following the sentencing, Owens's mother, Pamela Dias, and a close family friend established a nonprofit fund titled Standing in the Gap, dedicated to providing financial assistance and counseling resources for families affected by racially motivated violence.

The Owens family also partnered with national advocacy groups through their GoFundMe campaign to support policy efforts aimed at clarifying or repealing "stand your ground" provisions in Florida and other states.

In 2025, Owens's story became the subject of the documentary film The Perfect Neighbor, which incorporated police bodycam footage and firsthand accounts from witnesses and investigators. The film premiered at the Sundance Film Festival and won the 2025 Directing Award for U.S. Documentary. The documentary released on Netflix and debuted on the charts as the number-one movie in the U.S and number 3 worldwide.

Plans were also announced for a mural in downtown Ocala to commemorate Owens's life and legacy, symbolizing what organizers described as "a community's commitment to healing through truth".

== Response ==
In the days following the shooting, public grief and outrage grew quickly across Florida and beyond. Owens's mother, Pamela Dias, spoke emotionally about the trauma endured by her grandchildren—particularly the 10-year-old boy who stood beside his mother when she was shot. She told reporters that he had been "consumed with guilt" after trying to save Owens's life, telling his grandmother through tears, "Grandma, grandma, I couldn't save her."

Advocacy organizations, faith leaders, and elected officials joined the family's calls for justice. The executive director of Moms Demand Action for Gun Sense in America condemned the killing as "a senseless act made possible by lax gun laws and a culture that too often defaults to shooting first and asking questions later."

== See also ==
- Killing of Trayvon Martin – 2012 killing of teenager in Sanford, Florida
- Shooting of Ralph Yarl – 2023 shooting in Kansas City, Missouri
