= Critics Choice Documentary Award for Best First Documentary Feature =

Film award category

The Best First Documentary Feature is one of the annual Critics' Choice Documentary Awards. It is usually given to the director (or directors). The "first feature" designation is applied to the director.

At the 9th Critics' Choice Documentary Awards, the category was renamed to Best New Documentary Filmmaker(s).

== Winners and nominees ==
indicates the winner

=== 2010s ===
Year	Film	Director(s)	Ref.
2016 (1st)	Weiner	Josh Kriegman and Elyse Steinberg	
2016 (1st)	The Eagle Huntress	Otto Bell	
2016 (1st)	Hooligan Sparrow	Nanfu Wang	
2016 (1st)	Off the Rails	Adam Irving	
2016 (1st)	Tickled	David Farrier and Dylan Reeve	
2016 (1st)	The Witness	James D. Solomon	
2017 (2nd)	Kedi	Ceyda Torun	
2017 (2nd)	California Typewriter	Doug Nichol	
2017 (2nd)	Nowhere to Hide	Zaradasht Ahmed	
2017 (2nd)	Step	Amanda Lipitz	
2017 (2nd)	Strong Island	Yance Ford	
2017 (2nd)	Whose Streets?	Sabaah Folayan and Damon Davis	
2018 (3rd)	Science Fair	Cristina Costantini and Darren Foster	
2018 (3rd)	Minding the Gap	Bing Liu	
2018 (3rd)	Kusama: Infinity	Heather Lenz	
2018 (3rd)	Ryuichi Sakamoto: Coda	Stephen Nomura Schible	
2018 (3rd)	The Sentence	Rudy Valdez	
2018 (3rd)	Wild Wild Country	Chapman Way and Maclain Way	
2019 (4th)	Honeyland	Tamara Kotevska and Ljubomir Stefanov	
2019 (4th)	Be Natural: The Untold Story of Alice Guy-Blaché	Pamela B. Green	
2019 (4th)	David Crosby: Remember My Name	A.J. Eaton	
2019 (4th)	For the Birds	Richard Miron	
2019 (4th)	Love, Antosha	Garret Price	
2019 (4th)	Making Waves: The Art of Cinematic Sound	Midge Costin	

=== 2020s ===
Year	Film	Director(s)	Ref.
2020 (5th)	Mr. Soul!	Melissa Haizlip	
2020 (5th)	Ali & Cavett: The Tale of the Tapes	Robert S. Bader	
2020 (5th)	A Secret Love	Chris Bolan	
2020 (5th)	Feels Good Man	Arthur Jones	
2020 (5th)	Jane Goodall: The Hope	Elizabeth Leiter and Kim Woodard	
2020 (5th)	Stray	Elizabeth Lo	
2021 (6th)	Summer of Soul (…Or, When the Revolution Could Not Be Televised)	Ahmir "Questlove" Thompson	
2021 (6th)	Ascension	Jessica Kingdon	
2021 (6th)	Faya Dayi	Jessica Beshir	
2021 (6th)	Introducing, Selma Blair	Rachel Fleit	
2021 (6th)	Pray Away	Kristine Stolakis	
2021 (6th)	The Sparks Brothers	Edgar Wright	
2021 (6th)	The Velvet Underground	Todd Haynes	
2022 (7th)	Bad Axe	David Siev	
2022 (7th)	Cow	Andrea Arnold	
2022 (7th)	The Automat	Lisa Hurwitz	
2022 (7th)	My Old School	Jono McLeod	
2022 (7th)	Lucy and Desi	Amy Poehler	
2022 (7th)	The Territory	Alex Pritz	
2022 (7th)	Three Minutes: A Lengthening	Bianca Stigter	
2023 (8th)	20 Days in Mariupol	Mstyslav Chernov	
2023 (8th)	26.2 to Life	Christine Yoo	
2023 (8th)	Bad Press	Rebecca Landsberry-Baker and Joe Peeler	
2023 (8th)	Bobi Wine: The People's President	Christopher Sharp and Moses Bwayo	
2023 (8th)	Kokomo City	D. Smith	
2023 (8th)	Orlando, My Political Biography	Paul B. Preciado	
2023 (8th)	Smoke Sauna Sisterhood	Anna Hints	
2023 (8th)	The Thief Collector	Allison Otto	
2024 (9th)	Daughters	Natalie Rae and Angela Patton	
2024 (9th)	Porcelain War	Brendan Bellomo and Slava Leontyev	
2024 (9th)	Frida	Carla Gutiérrez	
2024 (9th)	Billy & Molly: An Otter Love Story	Charlie Hamilton James	
2024 (9th)	The Last of the Sea Women	Sue Kim	
2024 (9th)	Sugarcane	Julian Brave NoiseCat and Emily Kassie	
2025 (10th)	My Mom Jayne: A Film by Mariska Hargitay	Mariska Hargitay	
2025 (10th)	Art for Everybody	Miranda Yousef	
2025 (10th)	Grand Theft Hamlet	San Crane and Pinny Grylls	
2025 (10th)	Seeds	Brittany Shyne	
2025 (10th)	Stiller & Meara: Nothing Is Lost	Ben Stiller	
2025 (10th)	Strange Journey: The Story of Rocky Horror	Linus O'Brien	
