= 9th Critics' Choice Documentary Awards =

Film award ceremony

- Date: November 10, 2024
- Site: Edison Ballroom, New York City, United States
- Hosted by: Erich Bergen
- Most wins: Super/Man: The Christopher Reeve Story (6)
- Most nominations: Sugarcane (8)

Television/radio coverage
- Network: Facebook Live; YouTube; X

The 9th Critics Choice Documentary Awards, presented by the Critics Choice Association, were held on November 10, 2024, at the Edison Ballroom in New York City, to honor finest achievements in documentary filmmaking and non-fiction television.

The ceremony was hosted by American actor and television presenter Erich Bergen and broadcast live on Facebook Live, YouTube and X.

Nominations were announced on October 14, 2024, with Sugarcane, directed by Julian Brave NoiseCat and Emily Kassie, leading the nominations with eight, followed by Billy & Molly: An Otter Love Story, Daughters, and Super/Man: The Christopher Reeve Story, with six nominations each.

American documentary filmmaker Rory Kennedy was honored with the Pennebaker Award (Lifetime Achievement Award). Super/Man: The Christopher Reeve Story received the most awards with six wins, including Best Documentary Feature which tied with Will & Harper, followed by The Last of the Sea Women, Simone Biles Rising and Sugarcane, two wins each.

== Changes ==
The category for Best First Documentary Feature was renamed into Best New Documentary Filmmaker(s).

== Winners and nominees ==
The nominations were announced on October 14, 2024. Winners are listed first and in bold.

**Best Documentary Feature**: **Super/Man: The Christopher Reeve Story (Warner Bros. Pictures, DC Studios, HBO Documentary Films, CNN Films)**; **Will & Harper (Netflix)**; Billy & Molly: An Otter Love Story (National Geographic); Daughters (Netflix); The Greatest Night in Pop (Netflix); Jim Henson Idea Man (Disney+); Music by John Williams (Walt Disney Studios); Piece by Piece (Focus Features); The Remarkable Life of Ibelin (Netflix); Sugarcane (National Geographic)	**Best Director**: **Ian Bonhôte & Peter Ettedgui – Super/Man: The Christopher Reeve Story (Warner Bros. Pictures, DC Studios, HBO Documentary Films, CNN Films)**; Josh Greenbaum – Will & Harper (Netflix); Ron Howard – Jim Henson Idea Man (Disney+); Julian Brave NoiseCat & Emily Kassie – Sugarcane (National Geographic); Natalie Rae & Angela Patton – Daughters (Netflix); Benjamin Ree – The Remarkable Life of Ibelin (Netflix)
**Best New Documentary Filmmaker(s)**: **Natalie Rae & Angela Patton – Daughters (Netflix)**; Brendan Bellomo & Slava Leontyev – Porcelain War (Picturehouse); Carla Gutiérrez – Frida (Amazon MGM Studios); Charlie Hamilton James – Billy & Molly: An Otter Love Story (National Geographic); Sue Kim – The Last of the Sea Women (Apple TV+); Julian Brave NoiseCat & Emily Kassie – Sugarcane (National Geographic)	**Best True Crime Documentary**: **Sugarcane (National Geographic)**; American Nightmare (Netflix); Black Box Diaries (MTV Documentary Films, Paramount+); Incident (The New Yorker); The Jinx – Part Two (HBO / Max); Stopping the Steal (HB0 / Max)
**Best Archival Documentary**: **Super/Man: The Christopher Reeve Story (Warner Bros. Pictures, DC Studios, HBO Documentary Films, CNN Films)**; Black Twitter: A People's History (Hulu / Onyx Collective); The Greatest Night in Pop (Netflix); Jim Henson Idea Man (Disney+); Made in England: The Films of Powell and Pressburger (Cohen Media Group); Soundtrack to a Coup d'Etat (Kino Lorber)	**Best Biographical Documentary**: **Super/Man: The Christopher Reeve Story (Warner Bros. Pictures, DC Studios, HBO Documentary Films, CNN Films)**; Frida (Amazon MGM Studios); I Am: Celine Dion (Amazon MGM Studios); Jim Henson Idea Man (Disney+); The Remarkable Life of Ibelin (Netflix); Steve! (Martin) A Documentary in 2 Pieces (Apple TV+)
**Best Political Documentary**: **Sugarcane (National Geographic)**; Bad River (50 Eggs Films); Girls State (Apple TV+); Porcelain War (Picturehouse); Stopping the Steal (HB0 / Max); The Truth vs. Alex Jones (HBO / Max)	**Best Sports Documentary**: **Simone Biles Rising (Netflix)**; Copa 71 (New Black Films); The Dynasty: New England Patriots (Apple TV+); Mountain Queen: The Summits of Lhakpa Sherpa (Netflix); Mr. McMahon (Netflix); The Turnaround (Netflix)
**Best Historical Documentary**: **The Greatest Night in Pop (Netflix)**; Bad River (50 Eggs Films); Dahomey (Mubi); Made in England: The Films of Powell and Pressburger (Cohen Media Group); Soundtrack to a Coup d'Etat (Kino Lorber); Sugarcane (National Geographic)	**Best Science/Nature Documentary**: **The Last of the Sea Women (Apple TV+)**; Apollo 13: Survival (Netflix); Billy & Molly: An Otter Love Story (National Geographic); Blink (National Geographic); Secrets of the Octopus (National Geographic); The Space Race (National Geographic)
**Best Music Documentary**: **Music by John Williams (Walt Disney Studios)**; The Greatest Night in Pop (Netflix); I Am: Celine Dion (Amazon MGM Studios); Piece by Piece (Focus Features); Road Diary: Bruce Springsteen and The E Street Band (Hulu); Soundtrack to a Coup d'Etat (Kino Lorber)	**Best Short Documentary**: **The Only Girl in the Orchestra (Netflix)**; I Am Ready, Warden (MTV Documentary Films, Paramount+); Incident (The New Yorker); Makayla's Voice: A Letter to the World (Netflix); Once Upon a Time in Ukraine (Earle Mack Productions, Storyville Films, Goldcrest Films); The Turnaround (Netflix)
**Best Ongoing Documentary Series**: **30 for 30 (ESPN)**; America's Most Wanted (Fox Broadcasting Company); The Food That Built America (History Channel); Independent Lens (PBS); The Jinx – Part Two (HBO / Max); POV (PBS)	**Best Limited Documentary Series**: **Simone Biles Rising (Netflix)**; America's Sweethearts: Dallas Cowboys Cheerleaders (Netflix); Black Twitter: A People's History (Hulu / Onyx Collective); Mr. McMahon (Netflix); Ren Faire (HBO / Max); Secrets of the Octopus (National Geographic)
**Best Narration**: **Steve! (Martin) A Documentary in 2 Pieces – Written and performed by Steve Martin (Apple TV+)**; Bad River – Written by Mary Mazzio; Performed by Quannah Chasinghorse & Edward Norton (50 Eggs Films); Billy & Molly: An Otter Love Story – Written by Charlie Hamilton James; Performed by Billy Mail & Susan Mail (National Geographic); Dahomey – Written by Makenzy Orcel; Performed by Lucrece Houegbelo, Parfait Viayinon, Didier Sedoha Nassegande & Sabine Badjogoumin (Mubi); Made in England: The Films of Powell and Pressburger – Written and performed by Martin Scorsese (Cohen Media Group); Queens – Written by Chloë Sarosh; Performed by Angela Bassett (National Geographic)	**Best Score**: **Super/Man: The Christopher Reeve Story – Ilan Eshkeri (Warner Bros. Pictures, DC Studios, HBO Documentary Films, CNN Films)**; Billy & Molly: An Otter Love Story – Erland Cooper (National Geographic); Will & Harper – Nathan Halpern (Netflix); The Remarkable Life of Ibelin – Uno Helmersson (Netflix); Daughters – Kelsey Lu (Netflix); Albert Brooks: Defending My Life – Marc Shaiman (HBO / Max)
**Best Cinematography**: **The Last of the Sea Women – Iris Ng, Eunsoo Cho & Justin Turkowski (Apple TV+)**; Daughters – Michael "Cambio" Fernandez (Netflix); Billy & Molly: An Otter Love Story – Charlie Hamilton James, Johnny Rolt & Bertie Gregory (National Geographic); Sugarcane – Christopher LaMarca & Emily Kassie (National Geographic); Will & Harper – Zoë White (Netflix); The Blue Angels – Jessica Young (Amazon MGM Studios)	**Best Editing**: **Super/Man: The Christopher Reeve Story – Otto Burnham (Warner Bros. Pictures, DC Studios, HBO Documentary Films, CNN Films)**; Soundtrack to a Coup d'Etat – Rik Chaubet (Kino Lorber); Jim Henson Idea Man – Paul Crowder (Disney+); Daughters – Troy Lewis & Adelina Bichiș (Netflix); Sugarcane – Nathan Punwar & Maya Daisy Hawke (National Geographic); The Remarkable Life of Ibelin – Robert Stengård (Netflix)

=== Pennebaker Award ===
- **Rory Kennedy**

== Films with multiple wins and nominations ==
Films with multiple wins
Wins	Film
6	Super/Man: The Christopher Reeve Story
2	The Last of the Sea Women
2	Simone Biles Rising
2	Sugarcane

Films with multiple nominations
Nominations	Film	Production company(ies)
8	Sugarcane	National Geographic
6	Super/Man: The Christopher Reeve Story	Warner Bros. Pictures, DC Studios, HBO Documentary Films, CNN Films
6	Daughters	Netflix
6	Billy & Molly: An Otter Love Story	National Geographic
5	The Remarkable Life of Ibelin	Netflix
5	Jim Henson Idea Man	Disney+
4	Will & Harper	Netflix
4	The Greatest Night in Pop	Netflix
4	Made in England: The Films of Powell and Pressburger	Cohen Media Group
4	Soundtrack to a Coup d'Etat	Kino Lorber
3	Bad River	50 Eggs Films
3	The Last of the Sea Women	Apple TV+
2	The Jinx – Part Two	HBO / Max
2	Stopping the Steal	HBO / Max
2	Dahomey	Mubi
2	Secrets of the Octopus	National Geographic
2	The Turnaround	Netflix
2	Mr. McMahon	Netflix
2	Simone Biles Rising	Netflix
2	I Am: Celine Dion	Amazon MGM Studios
2	Incident	The New Yorker
2	Porcelain War	Picturehouse
2	Frida	Amazon MGM Studios
2	Music by John Williams	Walt Disney Studios
2	Steve! (Martin) A Documentary in 2 Pieces	Apple TV+
2	Piece by Piece	Focus Features
2	Black Twitter: A People's History	Hulu / Onyx Collective
