= 3rd Critics' Choice Documentary Awards =

Critics' Choice Documentary Awards 2018

- Date: November 11, 2018
- Site: Brooklyn, New York, United States
- Official website: www.criticschoice.com

The 3rd Critics' Choice Documentary Awards were presented on November 11, 2018, in Brooklyn, New York, honoring the finest achievements in documentary filmmaking and non-fiction television. The nominees were announced in October 15, 2018 with Free Solo leading the nominations with six.

== Special awards ==
At the ceremony, filmmaker Stanley Nelson was presented with the Critics' Choice Impact Award while director Michael Moore received the Critics' Choice Lifetime Achievement Award.

== Winners and nominees ==
Best Documentary Feature: Won't You Be My Neighbor? (Focus Features); Crime + Punishment (Hulu); Dark Money (PBS); Free Solo (National Geographic Documentary Films); Hal (Oscilloscope); Hitler's Hollywood (Kino Lorber); Minding the Gap (Hulu); RBG (Magnolia Pictures, Participant Media); Three Identical Strangers (Neon, CNN Films); Wild Wild Country (Netflix)	Best Direction for a Documentary Feature: Morgan Neville – Won't You Be My Neighbor?; Jimmy Chin and Elizabeth Chai Vasarhelyi – Free Solo; Bing Liu – Minding the Gap; Kimberly Reed – Dark Money; Rudiger Suchsland – Hitler's Hollywood; Tim Wardle – Three Identical Strangers
Best Limited Documentary Series: The Zen Diaries of Garry Shandling (HBO); America to Me (Starz); Dirty Money (Netflix); Elvis Presley: The Searcher (HBO Documentary Films, Sony Pictures Television); Flint Town (Netflix); One Strange Rock (National Geographic); The Fourth Estate (Showtime Networks); Wild Wild Country (Netflix)	Best Ongoing Documentary Series: Anthony Bourdain: Parts Unknown (CNN); 30 for 30 (ESPN); American Masters (PBS); Frontline (PBS); Independent Lens (PBS); Making a Murderer (Netflix); POV (PBS); The History of Comedy (CNN)
Best First Time Director: Cristina Costantini and Darren Foster – Science Fair; Bing Liu – Minding the Gap; Heather Lenz – Kusama: Infinity; Stephen Nomura Schible – Ryuichi Sakamoto: Coda; Rudy Valdez – The Sentence; Chapman Way and Maclain Way – Wild Wild Country	Most Innovative Documentary: Free Solo (National Geographic Documentary Film); 306 Hollywood (PBS, El Tigre); Hitler's Hollywood (Kino Lorber); Ryuichi Sakamoto: Coda (MUBI); Wild Wild Country (Netflix); Won't You Be My Neighbor? (Focus Features)
Best Political Documentary: RBG – (Magnolia Pictures, Participant Media); Dark Money – (PBS); Fahrenheit 11/9 – (Briarcliff Entertainment); Flint Town (Netflix); Hitler's Hollywood (Kino Lorber); John McCain: For Whom the Bell Tolls (HBO); The Fourth Estate (Showtime Networks)	Best Sports Documentary: Free Solo (National Geographic Documentary Film); André the Giant (HBO); Being Serena (HBO); John McEnroe: In the Realm of Perfection (Oscilloscope Laboratories); Minding the Gap (Hulu); The Workers Cup (Passion River)
Best Music Documentary: Quincy (Netflix); Bad Reputation (Magnolia Pictures); David Bowie: The Last Five Years (HBO Documentary Films); Elvis Presley: The Searcher (HBO Documentary Films, Sony Pictures Television); Lynyrd Skynyrd: If I Leave Here Tomorrow (Showtime Networks); Ryuichi Sakamoto: Coda (MUBI); Whitney (Roadside Attractions, Miramax)	Most Compelling Living Subject of a Documentary: Scotty Bowers – Scotty and the Secret History of Hollywood; Ruth Bader Ginsburg – RBG; Alex Honnold – Free Solo; Joan Jett – Bad Reputation; Quincy Jones – Quincy; David Kellman and Bobby Shafran – Three Identical Strangers; John McEnroe – John McEnroe: In the Realm of Perfection; Leon Vitali – Filmworker
Best Cinematography: Jimmy Chin, Clair Popkin, Mikey Schaefer – Free Solo; Elan Bogarin, Jonathan Bogarin, Alejandro Mejía – 306 Hollywood; Brett Lowell – The Dawn Wall; Bing Liu – Minding the Gap; David Douglas – Pandas; Adam Stone – Wild Wild Country	Best Editing: Jeff Malmberg, Aaron Wickenden – Won't You Be My Neighbor?; Jay Arthur Sterrenberg – Dark Money; Tony Zierra – Filmworker; Bob Eisenhardt – Free Solo; Julien Faraut – John McEnroe: In the Realm of Perfection; Michael Harte – Three Identical Strangers

== Films by multiple nominations and wins ==
The following films received multiple nominations:

Nominations	Film
7	Free Solo
5	Wild Wild Country
5	Minding the Gap
4	Three Identical Strangers
4	Hitler's Hollywood
4	Dark Money
4	Won't You Be My Neighbor?
3	RBG
3	Ryuichi Sakamoto: Coda
3	John McEnroe: In the Realm of Perfection
2	The Fourth Estate
2	Elvis Presley: The Searcher
2	306 Hollywood
2	Flint Town
2	Quincy
2	Bad Reputation
2	Filmworker

The following films received multiple awards:

Wins	Film
4	Free Solo
3	Won't You Be My Neighbor?
2	Quincy
2	RBG

== See also ==
- 91st Academy Awards
- 71st Primetime Creative Arts Emmy Awards
