= 2nd Critics' Choice Documentary Awards =

Critics' Choice Documentary Awards 2017

- Date: November 2, 2017
- Site: Brooklyn, New York, United States
- Official website: www.criticschoice.com

The 2nd Critics' Choice Documentary Awards were presented on November 2, 2017, in Brooklyn, New York, honoring the finest achievements in documentary filmmaking and non-fiction television. The nominees were announced on October 11, 2017.

== Winners and nominees ==
Best Documentary Feature: Jane; Abacus: Small Enough to Jail; Beware the Slenderman; Bright Lights: Starring Carrie Fisher and Debbie Reynolds; California Typewriter; Chasing Coral; City of Ghosts; Cries from Syria; Dawson City: Frozen Time; Eagles of Death Metal: Nos Amis; Ex Libris: The New York Public Library; Faces Places; Kedi; One of Us; Spettacolo; Strong Island	Best Direction for a Documentary Feature: Evgeny Afineevsky – Cries from Syria; Frederick Wiseman – Ex Libris: The New York Public Library; Amir Bar-Lev – Long Strange Trip; Matthew Heineman – City of Ghosts; Bill Morrison – Dawson City: Frozen Time; Doug Nichol – California Typewriter; Jeff Orlowski – Chasing Coral; Irene Taylor Brodsky – Beware the Slenderman; Ceyda Torun – Kedi; Agnès Varda & JR – Faces Places
Best First Documentary Feature: Kedi; California Typewriter; Nowhere to Hide; Step; Strong Island; Whose Streets?	Best Political Documentary: Abacus: Small Enough to Jail; 11/8/16; An Inconvenient Sequel: Truth to Power; City of Ghosts; Dolores; The Reagan Show
Best Music Series: Clive Davis: The Soundtrack of Our Lives; Contemporary Color; Eagles of Death Metal: Nos Amis; I Called Him Morgan; Long Strange Trip; Rumble: The Indians Who Rocked the World	Best Sports Documentary: Icarus; AlphaGo; Disgraced; Speed Sisters; Take Every Wave: The Life of Laird Hamilton; Trophy
Best Ongoing Documentary Series (TV/Streaming): American Masters; 30 for 30; Frontline; Independent Lens; POV; VICE	Best Limited Documentary Series: The Vietnam War; The Defiant Ones; Five Came Back; The Keepers; The Nineties; Planet Earth II
Most Compelling Living Subject of a Documentary Honorees: The Cats of Istambul – Kedi; Etty Ausch – One of Us; Al Gore – An Inconvenient Sequel: Truth to Power; Dolores Huerta – Dolores; Gigi Lazzarato – This is Everything: Gigi Gorgeous; The Sung Family – Abacus: Small Enough to Jail	Most Innovative Documentary: Last Men in Aleppo; Dawson City: Frozen Time; 78/52; Casting JonBenet; Karl Marx City; Kedi
Best Song in a Documentary: “Jump” – Step – By Cynthia Erivo; “Truth to Power” – An Inconvenient Sequel: Truth to Power – By OneRepublic; “Tell Me How Long” – Chasing Coral – By Kristen Bell; “Prayers for This World” – Cries from Syria – By Cher; “Best I Can” – Dina – By Michael Cera featuring Sharon Van Etten; “Dancing Through the Wreckage” – Served Like a Girl – By Pat Benatar

== Films by multiple nominations and wins ==
The following films received multiple nominations:

Nominations	Film
5	Kedi
3	Abacus: Small Enough to Jail
3	California Typewriter
3	Chasing Coral
3	City of Ghosts
3	Cries from Syria
3	Dawson City: Frozen Time
3	An Inconvenient Sequel: Truth to Power
2	Dolores
2	Step
2	Beware the Slenderman
2	Faces Places
2	Eagles of Death Metal: Nos Amis
2	Ex Libris: The New York Public Library
2	One of Us
2	Strong Island
2	Long Strange Trip

The following films received multiple awards:

Wins	Film
2	Abacus: Small Enough to Jail
2	Kedi

== See also ==
- 90th Academy Awards
- 70th Primetime Emmy Awards
