= ECPI University =

American private for-profit university

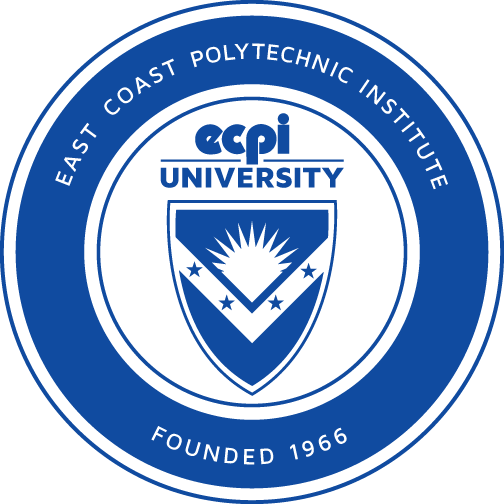
- Former names: Electronic Computer Programming Institute; ECPI College of Technology
- Type: Private for-profit university
- Established: 1966
- Founder: Alfred Dreyfus
- Accreditation: Southern Association of Colleges and Schools Commission on Colleges
- President: Mark Dreyfus
- Administrative staff: 150
- Students: 12,572 (2024)
- Location: Virginia Beach, Virginia, United States; 36°50′34″N 76°10′29″W
- Campus: Online and multiple physical campuses
- Colors: Blue & White
- Mascot: Ram
- Website: www.ecpi.edu
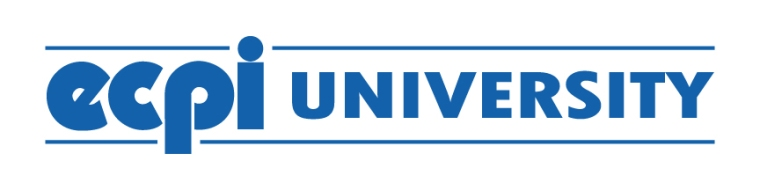

ECPI University, also known as East Coast Polytechnic Institute, is a private for-profit university based in Virginia Beach, Virginia. It was founded in 1966 in Norfolk, Virginia, and offers certificates and associate, bachelor's, and master's degrees in fields including health science, nursing, technology, business, criminal justice, and culinary arts. ECPI University is accredited by the Southern Association of Colleges and Schools Commission on Colleges.

== History ==
ECPI University was founded in 1966 in Norfolk, Virginia, by Alfred Dreyfus, a Holocaust survivor who immigrated to the United States in 1947 and later worked as an electrical technician.

The school began as the Electronic Computer Programming Institute, a technical training program for students preparing to work in the computer industry. Its first campus had two classrooms and a laboratory equipped with an IBM card sorter and an IBM accounting machine. The initial course enrolled six students and taught programming languages used by bank computers at the time.

The institution later expanded its offerings beyond computer programming to include electronics, health science, nursing, technology, business, criminal justice, and culinary arts. In 1997, it became ECPI College of Technology. On June 1, 2011, it changed its name to ECPI University and began offering master's degrees in computer and information science.

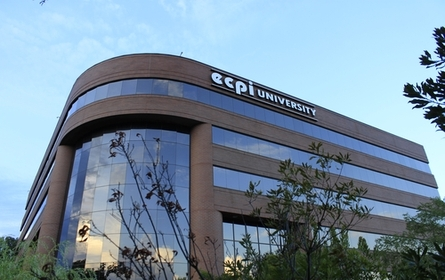
ECPI University building in Virginia Beach

In 2012, ECPI University was included in a broader Senate review of for-profit higher education conducted by the United States Senate Committee on Health, Education, Labor and Pensions. The report stated that students at ECPI University's physical campuses withdrew at lower rates than students at many of the other companies reviewed, while students in its smaller online division withdrew at higher rates. It also noted increases in student-loan default measures during the period examined.

== Academics ==
ECPI University offers certificate, associate, bachelor's, and master's programs in applied fields, including health science, nursing, computer and information sciences, engineering technology, business, criminal justice, and culinary arts.

Programs are offered through campus-based and distance education formats, as well as weekend and evening classes. ECPI University's culinary programs are offered through the Culinary Institute of Virginia.

In fall 2024, ECPI University had a student-faculty ratio of 13 to 1.

ECPI University participates in education programs for military students and veterans, including the Yellow Ribbon Program and the Department of Defense Voluntary Education Partnership Memorandum of Understanding.

== Campuses ==
ECPI University offers programs online and at physical locations in Virginia, North Carolina, South Carolina, Georgia, Florida, and Texas.

Its physical locations include Virginia Beach, Newport News, Northern Virginia, Richmond, and Roanoke in Virginia; Charlotte, Greensboro, and Raleigh in North Carolina; Greenville, Columbia, and Charleston in South Carolina; Atlanta in Georgia; Orlando in Florida; and San Antonio in Texas.

== Accreditation and classification ==
ECPI University is institutionally accredited by the Southern Association of Colleges and Schools Commission on Colleges. The university has been accredited since 1998, with its most recent reaffirmation in 2023 and its next reaffirmation scheduled for 2033.

The Carnegie Classification of Institutions of Higher Education classifies ECPI University as a special-focus institution in applied and career studies.

ECPI University nursing programs hold programmatic accreditation from the Accreditation Commission for Education in Nursing and the Commission on Collegiate Nursing Education.

== Notable alumni ==
- Angela Patton, activist, filmmaker, co-director of Daughters, and CEO of Girls For A Change
