= Lysaker (surname) =

Lysaker is a surname. Notable people with the surname include:

- John Lysaker (born 1966), American philosopher
- Paul H. Lysaker (1960–2023), American clinical psychologist
