= You Must Change Your Life: Poetry, Philosophy, and the Birth of Sense =

2002 non-fiction book by John Lysaker

- Author: John Lysaker
- Language: English
- Subject: philosophy of literature
- Published: 2002
- Publisher: Pennsylvania State University Press
- Publication place: United States
- Media type: Print
- Pages: 223
- ISBN: 0271022280

You Must Change Your Life: Poetry, Philosophy, and the Birth of Sense is a 2002 book by John Lysaker in which the author provides a philosophical treatment of poetry through an interlocution between Martin Heidegger and Charles Simic. The title is derived from the poem "Archaic Torso of Apollo" by Rainer Maria Rilke. According to Lysaker, his goal is to "sharpen the ears we bring to certain poems so that we might see how thoroughly they can change our lives".

The book was reviewed by David Rodick (University of Southern Maine) and Herman Rapaport (University of Southampton). It also received short reviews from Richard Polt (Xavier University) and Jason Wirth (Seattle University).
