= Billy & Molly: An Otter Love Story =

- Directed by: Charlie Hamilton-James
- Produced by: Jeff Wilson
- Starring: Billy Mail, Susan Mail
- Release date: May 6, 2024 (location)
- Running time: 77 mins
- Country: US
- Language: English

Billy & Molly: An Otter Love Story is a 2024 documentary film about a wild otter named Molly and her human rescuer, Billy Mail.

== Production ==
The film takes place in Shetland, Scotland and stars Billy Mail and his wife Susan. Charlie Hamilton-James directed the documentary which has a runtime of 77 mins.

== Summary ==
The film follows the couple who live on the beautiful remote island and find the orphaned otter Molly washed up on their shore. The couple take on a parental role, helping the completely dependent Molly survive while she helps Billy and Susan blossom.

== Reception ==
=== Accolades ===
Award	Date	Category	Recipient	Result	Ref.
San Francisco International Film Festival	April 28, 2024	Best Documentary Feature	Billy & Molly: An Otter Love Story	Nominated	
Critics' Choice Documentary Awards	November 10, 2024	Best Documentary Feature	Billy & Molly: An Otter Love Story	Nominated	
Critics' Choice Documentary Awards	November 10, 2024	Best Science/Nature Documentary	Billy & Molly: An Otter Love Story	Nominated	
Critics' Choice Documentary Awards	November 10, 2024	Best New Documentary Filmmaker(s)	Charlie Hamilton James	Nominated	
Critics' Choice Documentary Awards	November 10, 2024	Best Narration	Charlie Hamilton James, Billy Mail & Susan Mail	Nominated	
Critics' Choice Documentary Awards	November 10, 2024	Best Score	Erland Cooper	Nominated	
Critics' Choice Documentary Awards	November 10, 2024	Best Cinematography	Charlie Hamilton James, Johnny Rolt & Bertie Gregory	Nominated	
News and Documentary Emmy Awards	June 26, 2025	Outstanding Nature Documentary	Billy & Molly: An Otter Love Story	Nominated	
News and Documentary Emmy Awards	June 26, 2025	Outstanding Promotional Announcement: Documentary	Billy & Molly: An Otter Love Story	Nominated	
News and Documentary Emmy Awards	June 26, 2025	Outstanding Direction: Documentary	Charlie Hamilton James	Nominated	
News and Documentary Emmy Awards	June 26, 2025	Outstanding Writing: Documentary	Charlie Hamilton James	Won	
News and Documentary Emmy Awards	June 26, 2025	Outstanding Music Composition: Documentary	Erland Cooper	Nominated	
News and Documentary Emmy Awards	June 26, 2025	Outstanding Sound: Documentary	Renzo Spiteri, Kate Hopkins, Graham Wild	Nominated	
