= Praeg =

Praeg is a surname. Notable people with the surname include:

- Anton Praeg (1897–?), South African Olympic wrestler
- Leonhard Praeg (born 1966), South African philosopher and novelist
