= Schizophrenia and the Fate of the Self =

2008 book by Paul Lysaker and John Lysaker

- Author: Paul Lysaker, John Lysaker
- Language: English
- Subject: Schizophrenia
- Published: 2008
- Publisher: Oxford University Press
- Publication place: United States
- Media type: Print
- Pages: 190
- ISBN: 978-0-19-921576-8

Schizophrenia and the Fate of the Self is a 2008 book by Paul Lysaker and John Lysaker, in which the authors discuss the philosophical and psychiatric aspects of schizophrenia.

== Reception ==
The book was reviewed in the Psychiatric Rehabilitation Journal, Psychosis, and Tijdschrift voor Psychiatrie.
