= Philosophy, Writing, and the Character of Thought =

2018 non-fiction book by John Lysaker

- Author: John Lysaker
- Language: English
- Subject: philosophy of literature
- Published: 2018
- Publisher: University of Chicago Press
- Publication place: United States
- Media type: Print
- Pages: 193
- ISBN: 9780226815855

Philosophy, Writing, and the Character of Thought is a 2018 book by John Lysaker in which the author tries to show that philosophical thought is a praxis bound up with writing.

== Synopsis ==
Lysaker's first argument is that writing should be regarded as a praxis and not a techne, which opens it to the kind of deliberation Aristotle champions in his ethics. (And Lysaker argues that praxis better suits philosophical writing than style.) He then argues that deliberate writing should concern itself with at least three kinds of questions. First, how will a given genre and/or logical-rhetorical operation influence how one's thought unfolds? The question arises because philosophical writing does more than report results. It is a process of discovery in its own right, and the process unfolds differently in the aphorism than it does in the essay, and differently through irony than through the counter-example. (Along the way, Lysaker argues against strong form-content distinctions, claiming that each influences the other.) After considering the ways in which various genres and logical-rhetorical operations influence how thought unfolds (with an extended section on irony), Lysaker turns to a second question he finds essential to deliberate writing. What kind of relationship does a given genre and/or logical-rhetorical operation establish with regard to addressees? As with thought's self-relation, different genres and logical-rhetorical operations prompt and solicit different responses from readers, a point Lysaker argues in various contexts, including the polemic and the professional article, and with regard to the elusive phenomenon of voice.

Thinking, text, and reader meet in various historical contexts, and thus deliberate writing must ask: how will these acts, namely, genres and logical rhetorical operations, play in one's historical moment? Is the footnote elitist or an essential reminder that insights are indebted to others, have histories, and are almost never contested? How might aphorisms function in a period of commodified thought and anti-intellectualism? In developing this point, Lysaker stages extended encounters with W. E. B. Du Bois's The Souls of Black Folk and Walter Benjamin's One Way Street in order to explore books that strove to be "equal to their moments," to use Benjamin's phrase. What does this mean as an aspiration for writing? And how we might gauge the relative success or failure of a venture?

Lysaker's final argument is that texts can be written (or read) as wholes if one gathers how they relate to thought's unfolding, their addressees, and their historical moment. When read (or written) in this manner, a text images philosophy. More particularly, it exemplifies a way in which philosophy can inhabit and contest the histories to which it belongs and to which it inevitably contributes. A text is thus something like a character in a discursive and material polis, exemplifying a certain way of life.

== Reception ==
The book was reviewed by Jeffrey A. Bernstein (College of the Holy Cross) and John Kaag (University of Massachusetts Lowell). It also received short reviews from Eddie Glaude (Princeton University), Edward S. Casey (SUNY Stony Brook) and Eduardo Mendieta (Pennsylvania State University).
