= Sam Bisbee =

American film producer

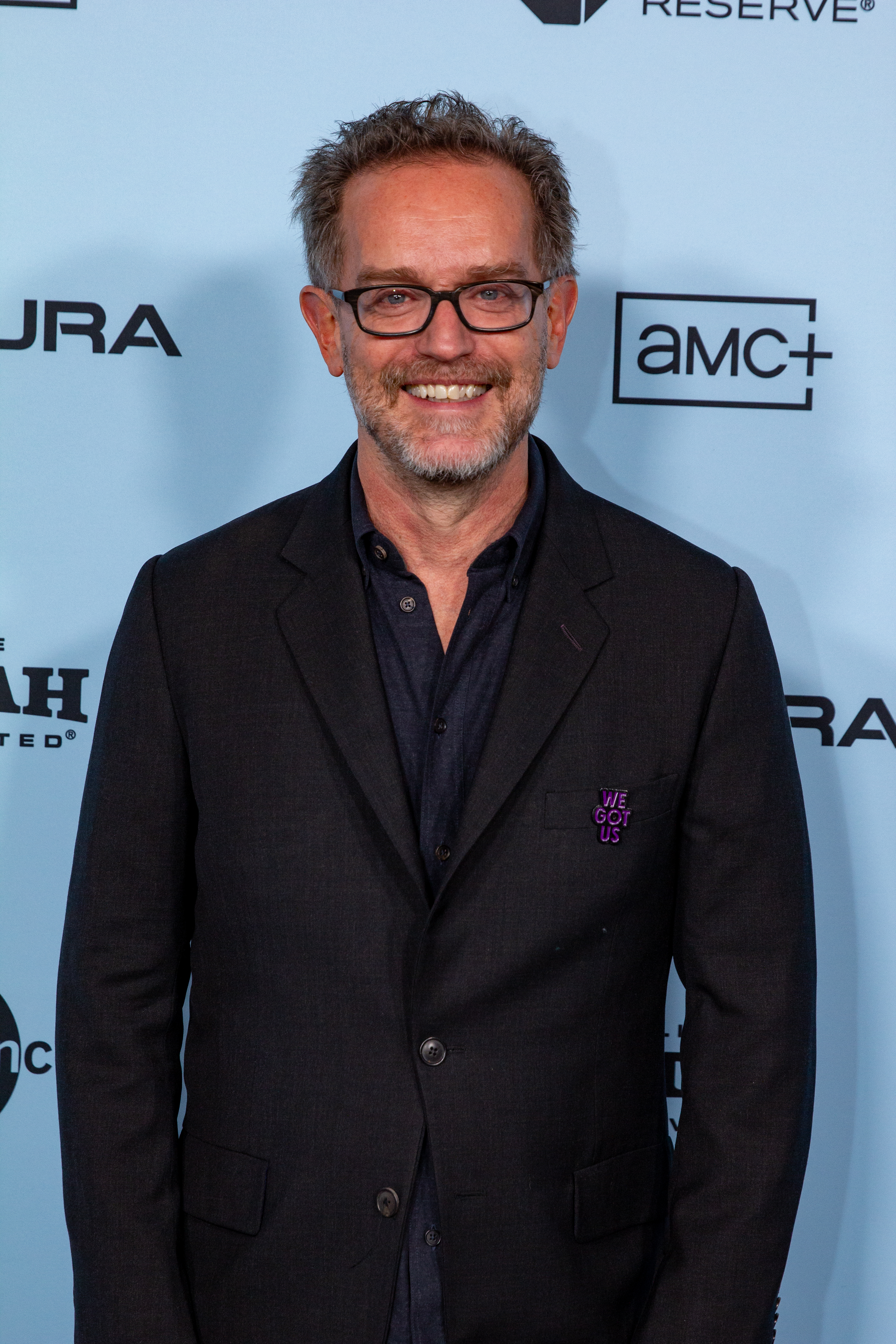
- Bisbee at the 2025 Sundance Film Festival
- Education: Columbia University (BA)
- Occupations: film producer and composer
- Relatives: John Bisbee (brother)
- Awards: Emmy Award (2019)

Sam Bisbee is an American independent film producer and composer. He is a co-winner of the Primetime Emmy Award for Exceptional Merit in Documentary Filmmaking in 2019 and Academy Award and British Academy Film Awards nominated producer.

== Biography ==
Bisbee graduated from Columbia University in 1990. After graduating from college, he worked as a songwriter, composer, and music producer. He is the brother of sculptor John Bisbee.

Bisbee has composed scores for movies, including the 2000 film Wildflowers and signed a publishing deal with Nettwerk in 2008. He also co-wrote the script and composed the score for movies Don't Go in the Woods, Mall, and produced The New Tenants, which won the Academy Award for Best Live Action Short Film in 2010.

Bisbee is a founding partner of Park Pictures Features, where he produced, and brought 13 films to premiere at the Sundance Film Festival, including the Alfred P. Sloan Prize-winning Robot & Frank and the Golden Globe-nominated Infinitely Polar Bear. His company won the 2019 Cannes Lions Palme d'Or, awarded to the top production company of the year and the company won a total of 19 awards at the festival.

He was nominated for the 2017 Independent Spirit Award for Best First Feature for co-producing the comedy-drama Other People. In 2018 he produced The Sentence for which he was honored with the Primetime Emmy Award for Exceptional Merit in Documentary Filmmaking.

In 2024 he co-produced Daughters for which he won a Peabody Awards and received his first nomination at the British Academy Film Awards.

In 2025 Bisbee produced The Perfect Neighbor, documentary film directed by Geeta Gandbhir about the killing of Ajike Owens, for which received nominations at the Academy Award for Best Documentary Feature Film.

== Filmography ==
=== Composer ===
Year	Title	Notes
1994	Jump	
1996	Around the Block	
1998	Reflections of a Sensitive Man	
1998	Girl	
1999	Wildflowers	
2004	The Undeserved	
2008	Paper Covers Rock	
2010	Don't Go in the Woods	
2013	Misfire: The Rise and Fall of the Shooting Gallery	
2015	The Preppie Connection	
2016	Supermoto	
2018	The Sentence	
2020	Born to Play	
2021	Make Him Known	
2024	Bliss	

=== Producer ===
Year	Title	Notes
2009	The New Tenants	
2010	Don't Go in the Woods	Also screenwriter
2012	Living Together	Executive
2012	Robot & Frank	
2014	God's Pocket	
2014	Infinitely Polar Bear	
2015	Cop Car	
2015	The Runner	Executive
2016	Other People	
2016	The Rehearsal	Executive
2017	Permanent	
2017	The Hero	
2018	Hearts Beat Loud	
2018	An Evening with Beverly Luff Linn	
2018	The Sentence	
2019	Lazy Susan	Executive
2019	Once Upon a River	Executive
2019	Swallow	Executive
2020	Born to Play	
2020	The Heart Still Hums	Executive
2020	The Last Shift	
2020	Farewell Amor	
2020	The Truffle Hunters	Executive
2020	Us Kids	
2021	Another Hayride	
2021	Long Weekend	
2021	Not Going Quietly	Executive
2021	Catch the Fair One	Executive
2021	Storm Lake	Executive
2022	Dusty & Stones	Executive
2022	The Independent	
2022	Broadway Rising	
2022	Aisha	
2022	There There	
2023	Earth Mama	
2023	Late Bloomers	
2023	Rule of Two Walls	
2023	Flipside	Executive
2023	The Wonder	Executive
2024	The Floor	TV game show
2024	Daughters	
2024	As We Speak	
2024	Grand Theft Hamlet	Executive
2024	Run 002	Executive
2025	The Perfect Neighbor	
2025	Bird in Hand	
2026	Soul Patrol	

== Awards and honors ==
Award	Year	Work	Category	Result	Ref.
Academy Awards	2026	The Perfect Neighbor	Best Documentary Feature Film	Pending	
British Academy Film Awards	2025	Daughters	Best Documentary	Nominated	
British Academy Film Awards	2026	The Perfect Neighbor	Best Documentary	Nominated	
Cinema Eye Honors	2025	Daughters	Outstanding Non-Fiction Feature	Nominated	
Cinema Eye Honors	2026	The Perfect Neighbor	Outstanding Non-Fiction Feature	Nominated	
Gotham Independent Film Awards	2025	The Perfect Neighbor	Best Documentary	Nominated	
Independent Spirit Awards	2017	Other People	Best First Feature	Nominated	
Independent Spirit Awards	2024	Earth Mamar	Best First Feature	Nominated	
Independent Spirit Awards	2026	The Perfect Neighbor	Best Documentary Feature	Won	
News and Documentary Emmy Awards	2022	Storm Lake	Outstanding Business and Economic Documentary	Nominated	
News and Documentary Emmy Awards	2023	Not Going Quietly	Outstanding Politics and Government Documentary	Nominated	
News and Documentary Emmy Awards	2025	As We Speak	Outstanding Arts and Culture Documentary	Nominated	
Peabody Awards	2025	Daughters	Documentary Award	Won	
Primetime Emmy Awards	2019	The Sentence	Exceptional Merit in Documentary Filmmaking	Won	
Producers Guild of America Award	2026	The Perfect Neighbor	Best Documentary Motion Picture	Pending	
Sundance Film Festival	2025	The Perfect Neighbor	Grand Jury Prize – U.S. Documentary Competition	Nominated	
