= Leonhard Praeg =

South African philosopher

Leonhard (Leonard) Praeg (born January 25, 1966) is a South African philosopher, novelist and emeritus professor in philosophy at Stellenbosch University. He is best known for his book A Report on Ubuntu, a study of southern Africa’s humanism or Ubuntu and its emancipatory potential in post-apartheid South Africa, and for The Aporia of Collective Violence, a philosophical analysis of the Tutsi genocide of 1994.

== Early life and education ==
Born and raised in Pretoria, Praeg matriculated in 1983 and began his tertiary studies at Stellenbosch University in 1986 where a formative experience led him to become a conscientious objector to apartheid-era military service. He obtained his Master's degree cum laude with a dissertation titled Die Self en die Ander : 'n Filosofiese Studie van die Selfdefiniëring van die Afrikaner in Enkele Geselekteerde Tekste, 1877-1948 (The Self and the Other: A Philosophical Study of the Self-definition of the Afrikaner in Selected texts, 1877–1948) in which he argues that, given their communitarian values, descriptions of the Afrikaner as "the white tribe of Africa" should be understood literally, and that consequently the violence of apartheid can be interpreted as a form of tribal warfare.

In 1999 he obtained his Ph.D. cum laude with a dissertation on the epistemological conditions for the possibility of an African philosophy. Subsequently published under the title African Philosophy and the Quest for Autonomy: A Philosophical Investigation, this dense and complex book calls much of the self-understanding and practice of the field of African Philosophy into question.

== Research in African Philosophy ==
=== Philosophical analysis of the Tutsi genocide ===
Praeg's work is rooted in African philosophy with a particular focus on African political philosophy and the politics of knowledge production in higher education. Committed to the idea that the philosopher's first obligation is to make comprehensible what appears incomprehensible, he published The Geometry of Violence: Africa, Girard, and Modernity in which he uses René Girard's mimetic theory to interpret as self-similar crises of post-conflict rights discourse, three forms of collective violence in postcolonial Africa: the Tutsi genocide of 1994, the "necklace murders" that marred the anti-apartheid liberation struggle, and the phenomenon of familicide that peaked in the first decade of post-apartheid South Africa. In his analysis of the Tutsi genocide, recognized as the first philosophical analysis of that tragic event, he argues that the genocide should be understood as deferred foundational violence because it aimed to complete the founding of the Rwandan state when in 1959 the Hutu overthrew the Tutsi monarchy to establish the republic of Rwanda—a deferred founding captured in the popular call among Hutu génocidaires to "complete the work of 1959"

=== "All philosophy is ethnophilosophy" ===
Praeg's subsequent research focused on Ubuntu and the politics of knowledge production in the postcolonial university. His book A Report on Ubuntu explores the ethical, political, and philosophical dimensions of the Ubuntu debate in post-apartheid South Africa. In this study, Praeg first develops the principle that he would further explore in his subsequent work, namely that "all philosophy is ethnophilosophy", or the political is First Philosophy. Historically in the Western canon, First Philosophy was understood as epistemology (Aristotle), ontology (Heidegger), or the ethical (Levinas). To argue that the political is First Philosophy is to ground the very act of thinking in the political stance of the theorists

As Molefe puts it, "Many a scholar of Ubuntu reduces it to some theory or ideology about humanity. A Report on Ubuntu resists being seduced by the theoretical (philosophical) reductionism that limits Ubuntu to this or that normative feature, be it friendliness or harmony (Metz), self-realization or perfection (Shutte; Bujo), spiritual harmony ( Murove), or transcendental care (Molefe). Instead, Praeg emphasizes the political nature of asking this question over the primacy of meanings and argumentation for various understandings of Ubuntu, without in any way shying away from engaging the latter."

Praeg decodes these political stances on the question of Ubuntu qua "critical humanism" in terms of the various "conceptual personae"—as developed by Deleuze and Guattari in What is Philosophy? (1991)—assumed by Ubuntu theorists. A "conceptual persona" captures the combined epistemological and ontological nets that inform or constitute various ways of configuring questions and answers about being and thinking. As with the question, What is Philosophy? and given the multiplicity of possible political stances or conceptual personae theorists can and do assume on the topic, the answer to the question, What is Ubuntu? or What does Ubuntu mean? must necessarily remain undecided, thereby reiterating the originary principle of the political as plurality (Arendt).

A Report on Ubuntu exemplifies Praeg's approach to postcolonial African philosophy as it bridges Western and African intellectual traditions to critically examine issues of identity, justice, modernity, and epistemology in the African context.

==== Critique of A Report on Ubuntu ====
Oduor has criticized the text for its "highly sophisticated way of expressing complex ideas— a fact which renders the text unnecessarily difficult to follow for the vast majority of African scholars for whom English is a second, or even a third language", in addition to which he contends the "report in the title introduces an unnecessary ambiguity in the reader's mind with regard to what to expect from the book, as he/she wonders whether or not he/she is about to be treated to a highly descriptive account of the discourse on Ubuntu ... or to a cold, highly formal write-up reminiscent of an official report ... It turns out that neither of the two kinds of text is to be found in the book, but rather a thoroughgoing critique of contemporary discourse on Ubuntu. Consequently, the title of the book exposes it to the risk of being bypassed by scholars who would benefit immensely from it."

=== Thinking Africa Project ===
The principle of the political as First Philosophy is carried forth in Praeg's subsequent work on the politics of knowledge production in higher education in South Africa. With colleagues in the Department of Political and International Studies at Rhodes University, he launched the Thinking Africa project in 2011— a research and publication initiative aimed at exploring critical questions in African thought. As series editor of the associated Thinking Africa book series, published in partnership with University of KwaZulu-Natal Press (UKZN Press), he oversaw the publication of several volumes that resulted from the project's annual international colloquia.

=== Philosophical Analysis of Fees Must Fall ===
In the introduction to Philosophy on the Border: Decoloniality and the Shudder of the Origin, Praeg applies the principle of the political as First Philosophy in his interpretation of the student protest/revolt Fees Must Fall of 2015-2016, the biggest student revolt in South Africa since the end of apartheid. In his analysis, Praeg takes seriously students' claims that:

1. the transition from apartheid to democratic South Africa had been a failure because liberal-democratic South Africa's political and epistemological foundations remain Western-centric, as a result of which
2. higher education remained financially unaffordable and epistemologically inaccessible to most students;
3. that this called for a return to the origin or founding of the democratic republic in order to re-imagine a transition that would be politically, socially, economically, and epistemologically just.

Praeg interprets the resulting "shudder" of the return to the founding as the revolutionary equivalent of the philosopher's claim that the political is First Philosophy and, consequentially, as a demand to "complete the work of 1994". In his interpretation, what the country witnessed was therefore not protest but revolt; more precisely, the movement "was both protest and/or revolt: it was a 'protest' for those protesters who still recognized the authority of the African National Congress (ANC) founded on the Constitution of 1996, and it was a 'revolt' for those who not only confronted the elite head on, but for whom the illegitimacy (or at least the legitimacy crisis) of the current ANC government necessitated a return to the founding". The aporia of the founding (Derrida) shadowed the protest/revolt in several undecidabilities, such as the un/lawfulness of students' actions, the moral ambiguity of the violence they invoked, and the role of familial rhetoric in liberal democracy discourse.

=== Decolonised Curricula ===
Praeg continued his commitment to a decolonised philosophical praxis in his capacity as head of the Department of Philosophy at the University of Pretoria (2017–2021) where his leadership and research focused on the demand for a decolonised curricula in light of the history of the modern, postcolonial university, the student protests of 2015–2016, the paradox of the need to politicize knowledge production at a time marked by the global depoliticization of universities, and the increasing tendency of universities to mimic and implement state-like security measures

== Career ==
Praeg has held academic positions at several South African universities. He started his career in the Department of Philosophy of Education, University of the Western Cape (1993), following which he joined the philosophy department at the University of Fort Hare (1996–1998). After completing his doctorate, he spent a brief period working as a composer before he joined Rhodes University's Department of Political and International Studies (2003–2016). This was followed by four years as head of the Philosophy Department at University of Pretoria (2017–2021). In 2021 he was appointed emeritus professor at his alma mater, the Philosophy Department of Stellenbosch University.

=== Artistic and Literary Endeavors ===
Praeg's academic career is framed by artistic and literary endeavors. Between 1994 and 2005 he was the resident composer of Rhodes University's First Physical Theatre company. Collaborating with Gary Gordon, Andrew Buckland, Reza de Wet, and Juanita Finestone, he composed several scores for the company's innovative physical theatre danceplays. His composition for piano and two celli, Duuskant (1994), originally composed for the company's documentary danceplay The Unspeakable Story and re-recorded in 2005 for piano and cello under the title Apocalypse Deux (in memory of the victims of the 1994 Tutsi genocide), features in Aryan Kaganof's 2016 documentary about Fees Must Fall titled Metalepsis in Black

Praeg has also published two literary novels. The first, Imitation, was hailed by Jason Wirth, author of Commiserating With Devastated Things: Milan Kundera and the Entitlements of Thinkingas "a strikingly original work of great subtlety, complexity, imagination, originality, and a clear homage to Milan Kundera's Immortality; a daringly original 'variation of a theme' that illuminates aspects of South Africa and Cote d'Ivoire's colonial and post-colonial legacy which transforms into an African post-colonial context themes we find in the stories of Goethe and Hemingway and their legacy in Immortality." This was followed in 2021 by Subtle Gravity, another innovative work that intertwines fiction and philosophy in a way that "delves into the political history of white South Africa, privilege and the political unconscious of Pretoria through a beguiling and whimsical interplay of texts, philosophies and films ranging from Buddhism, Christian mysticism, and quantum mechanics to Wim Wenders' Wings of Desire, Quentin Tarantino, Star Wars, Sigourney Weaver, and film noir. The result is fascinating, wonderful, astute, and masterly—and even better than the stunning and compelling Imitation".

Through his novels, Praeg brings philosophical inquiry to a broader audience, using storytelling as a medium to probe intellectual questions in a more popular and accessible way.

== Bibliography ==
=== Select Publications ===
- 2004: "Review of Conspiracy to Murder: The Rwandan Genocide" by Linda Melvern, Journal of Contemporary African Studies, Vol. 22, No 3.
- 2005: "Review of A Short History of African Philosophy by Barry Hallen (2002)" Journal of the International Africa Institute, Issue 4.
- 2008: "The Aporia of Collective Violence" Law and Critique, Vo. 19. No. 2.
- 2010: "Of Evil and other Figures of the Liminal" Theory, Culture & Society, Vol. 27, No. 5.
- 2011: "Sexual violence: mythology, infant rape and the limits of the political" Politikon, Vol. 38 (2).
- 2014: "Postcards from the postcolony" abridged German version in Polylog, 31-59, full-length English version in Violence in/and The Great Lakes; The Thought of V.Y. Mudimbe and Beyond, G. Farred, K. Kavwahirehi and L. Praeg (eds), UKZN Press.
- 2018: "Epistemologien des Südens und das Gespenst des leeren Signifikanten" Periperie No. 150/151.
- 2022 "Constitutive Causes of Colonial and Decolonial Reasoning", Etica & Politica/Ethics and Politics, XXIV/2, EUT Edizioni Università di Trieste, Trieste, 2022.

=== Book Chapters ===
- 2010: "Africa: Globalisation and the Ethical," in P. Cilliers and R. Preiser (eds.) Complexity, Difference and Identity. Dordrecht: Springer.
- 2017: "African Philosophy in a World of Terror" in African Handbook of Philosophy, Adeshina Afolayan (ed.). Palgrave.
- 2017: "Ubuntu and the Emancipation of Law" in African Handbook of Philosophy, Adeshina Afolayan (ed.). Palgrave.
- 2018: "This falling, falling into freedom: Ubuntu and the Question of Emancipation". Jonathan O. Chimakonam (ed.) Ka Osi So Onye: African Philosophy in the Postmodern Era. Vernon Press: Series in Philosophy.
- 2019: "Pharmakon: Race identity and closure", in Philosophy on the Border: Decoloniality and the Shudder of the Origin, Leonhard Praeg (ed). UKZN Press.
- 2022: "Totality by Analogy; Or: The Limits of Law and Black Subjectivity" in Jonathan O. Chimakonam and Edwin Etieyibo (eds.) Essays on Contemporary Issues in African Philosophy. Springer.
- 2024, "Just Thinking". Sebastian Thies, Sasanne Goumegou and Georgina Cebey (eds.). The Routledge Handbook for Global South Studies on Subjectivities, Routledge: London and New York.

=== Books ===
- 2000: African Philosophy and the Quest for Autonomy: A Philosophical Investigation, Editions Rodopi, Amsterdam.
- 2007: The Geometry of Violence: Africa, Girard, Modernity. SUN Press, South Africa.
- 2014: A Report on Ubuntu, UKZN Press.
- 2017 Imitation, UKZN Press.
- 2021: Subtle Gravity, UKZN Press.
