= John Bisbee =

American sculptor

John Bisbee (born 1965) is an American sculptor living and working in Brunswick, Maine. Bisbee received his B.F.A. from Alfred University and attended the Skowhegan School of Painting and Sculpture. He has held residencies at the MacDowell Colony and Yaddo. Bisbee's solo museum exhibitions include the Albright-Knox Art Gallery in Buffalo, the Kemper Museum of Contemporary Art in Kansas City, Missouri, and a mid-career retrospective at the Portland Museum of Art in Maine in 2008.

Bisbee is a recipient of a 2006 Joan Mitchell Foundation Grant. He has also received a The Rappaport Prize administered by the DeCordova Museum and Sculpture Park, as well as both the Purchase Prize and the William Thon Jurors' Prize through the Portland Museum of Art Biennial Exhibitions that he has participated in.

Bisbee's work has been reviewed in Art in America, ARTnews, Sculpture Magazine, The New Yorker, The New York Times and The Boston Globe.

John Bisbee is the elder brother of musician/film producer Sam Bisbee.
