= Emerson and Self-Culture =

2008 non-fiction book by John Lysaker

- Author: John Lysaker
- Language: English
- Subject: Ralph Waldo Emerson's thought
- Published: 2008
- Publisher: Indiana University Press
- Publication place: United States
- Media type: Print
- Pages: 226
- ISBN: 9780253219718

Emerson and Self-Culture is a 2008 book by John Lysaker, in which the author tries to provide an account of the notion of self-culture in Ralph Waldo Emerson's work.

== Reception ==
The book was reviewed by Corey McCall (Elmira College), Russell Goodman (University of New Mexico), Marcus B. Schulzke (SUNY Albany), and Heikki A. Kovalainen (University of Helsinki). McCall describes the book as a provocation to think along with Emerson and calls it a success.
