= Jeremy Mayer =

American sculptor (born 1972)

- Born: 1972 (age 53–54); Minnesota
- Website: https://www.jeremymayer.com/

Jeremy Mayer (born 1972, in Minnesota) is an American sculptor who uses typewriter parts and materials. He refers to his work as "cold assembly", as he does not use welding or glue.

== Early life and career ==
Mayer was born in Northern Minnesota in 1972. He moved to Northern California in 1990, and started his career in 1994.

== Work ==
Mayer does not use any power tools to disassemble the typewriters he uses, instead taking them apart by hand. When reassembling the typewriter components into his sculptures, he uses no welds, solder, glue, wire, or any material that is not part of a typewriter. His works usually are of human figures, animals, and insects. His work has been displayed at the San Francisco Museum of Modern Art, the Salon Des Indomptables in Paris, the Nevada Museum of Art in Reno, and Ripley’s Believe It or Not museums. He appeared in the 2016 documentary California Typewriter.

His work includes bird sculptures created in 2022, some of which can move.

He paid homage to the final set of Godrej & Boyce typewriters in a six-month stay in Mumbai. He lives and works in Oakland, California.
