= Don't Go in the Woods (2010 film) =

- Directed by: Vincent D'Onofrio
- Screenplay by: Vincent D'Onofrio
- Story by: Sam Bisbee; Joe Vinciguerra
- Cinematography: Mike Latino
- Edited by: Jennifer Lee
- Music by: Sam Bisbee
- Production company: 5 Minutes Productions
- Distributed by: Tribeca Films
- Release date: April 16, 2010 (Sarasota Film Festival)
- Running time: 83 minutes
- Country: United States
- Language: English
- Budget: $100,000

Don't Go in the Woods is a 2010 American horror musical written and directed by Vincent D'Onofrio. The film was first shown in 2010 at single locations in the United States. It was released on Video on demand (VOD) on 26 December 2011, and on general theatrical release in January 2012. The film was made in upper New York state by 5 Minutes Productions, and distributed by Tribeca Film.

== Plot ==
A band, consisting of leader Nick, Anton, Johnny, Carlo and the blind Robbie, decide to go camping in the woods to write new songs. Upon arriving, they discover a sign reading "Don't Go in the Woods", however they ignore it and set up camp in a nearby clearing. While Nick and Carlo are collecting firewood, they find a hunting cabin that is full of weapons including a sledgehammer, however they ignore it and decide to break the group's cellphones to help with the creative process. The band's manager Carson is attacked and killed while trying to find the campsite.

As night falls, their initial songwriting efforts were successful. Nick tells the legend of a group of warriors who became stranded in the woods and resorted to cannibalism, until only one survived. Soon after, the band are joined by a group of their female friends including Nick's ex-girlfriend Ashley, Johnny's girlfriend Callie, Melinda (and her foreign friend Sophie who speaks little English, Felicity and best friends Charlotte and Georgia. While the rest of the band are happy, Nick is upset, knowing they will get distracted. As the group drink and enjoy themselves, Charlotte becomes upset with Carlo's flirting and angrily leaves for a motel. Georgia follows Charlotte and the pair wander back to the cars. As Charlotte gets in the driving seat, a sledgehammer begins to smash through the windscreen, with Georgia's severed arm being flung onto the hood. As Charlotte attempts to drive away, the window is smashed open and she is attacked.

The following morning, Nick wakes everyone up early, determined to get the girls to leave. Anton offers to walk the girls to the van, however upon arriving they find the battery dead and are forced to return to the camp. During the day, Nick and Ashley briefly reconcile after their recent break-up, but Nick decides to spend the day writing alone, annoyed at the band's lack of focus. At night, the band continue to write new music. Nick takes all of the girls cellphones and breaks them, despite their protests. While Anton is performing a song he wrote he becomes upset and leaves, angering Nick. Felicity decides to search for Anton, but she is brutally hit and killed with a sledgehammer. Johnny and Callie also leave the campsite to make out, and are beaten to death.

The following day Melinda and Sophie go on a walk by the river. As Melinda helps Sophie improve her English, the killer arrives and drags Melinda away, eventually killing her. Sophie rushes back to the campsite to warn the others, but can not due to the language barrier, only confusing the others. The killer arrives again and kills Sophie, Carlo and Robbie. Meanwhile, Ashley runs into Nick as she is trying to escape the woods. However, Nick begins to play a song with his guitar instead of running. Ashley then notices blood all over Nick's hands, and realizes he is the killer. Ashley runs away and discovers Anton impaled through the neck. Nick catches up with her and cuts her back open, leaving her to die.

As the movie ends, a record producer (Eric Bogosian) congratulates Nick on his album, titled Don't Go in the Woods, telling him it was a good idea to "get rid of the band".

== Cast ==
- Matt Sbeglia as Nick Storm
- Cassandra Lee Walker as Ashley
- Casey Smith as Anton
- Soomin Lee as Johnny
- Kate O'Malley as Callie
- Jorgen Jorgensen as Carlo
- Nick Thorp as Robbie
- Nuriya Almaya as Sophie
- Gwynn Galitzen as Felicity
- Ali Tobia as Melinda
- Kira Gorelick as Charlotte
- Alyssa Jang as Georgia
- Bo Boddie as Carson
- Tim Lajcik as Monster
- Eric Bogosian as Producer

== Production ==
The film was shot on two cameras in woods on D'Onofrio's land in Woodstock, New York state. D'Onofrio decided to make the film during a waiting period for another project to go ahead; he said "My friends and I were in the middle of another project, waiting for the rights for that, and it was taking too long." Filming started two months after the initial idea, took twelve days to shoot, and was completed for a budget of $100,000.

The film is D'Onofrio's feature length directorial debut. During an interview with Patrick McDonald of hollywoodchicago.com, he was asked how directors he had worked with influenced him; D'Onofrio said that great directors stuck with their original idea and were not sidetracked. McDonald asked him "How did you honor those impressions," to which he replied, "I don’t know if I actually did that on my set. I used the script as a blueprint, we purposely wrote this 'B-movie' structure, and made it into a musical. Basically that was the plan, and that is what we achieved."

In an interview with Edward Douglas of Shocktillyoudrop.net, D'Onofrio spoke of how the film's genre was intended as a slasher musical, and that he had wanted to "make an absurd slasher musical". He went on to discuss how the casting was done "off the street [...] some of the girls worked in a coffee shop around the corner from my house". He did say that "three of the guys were in a band, the Dirty Dirty" and had recorded music together prior to the film. He also talked about how it was "difficult to keep tension [of a horror film] going" while interspersing it with musical numbers, "as singing releases on-screen tension."

D'Onofrio also said that the film's title was not a reference to the same-named 1981 film.

== Reception ==
Critical reception has been mostly negative. Rotten Tomatoes gives the film an approval rating of 13% with 7 of the 8 reviews being negative.

Kristen McCracken of Huffington Post Entertainment, described it as "a fun ride, with the loose feel of a campy B-horror-movie from decades past (the difference here is that Bisbee’s music is good), with twists and turns and jumps galore". Dustin Putman said that, although it "probably shouldn't work—or, at least, what ought to come off as campy—avoids such pitfalls", the film "is made in grand spirits and with undeniable know-how. It's conventional and truly one-of-a-kind all at once. There's nothing else out there like it."

Michelle Orange of Movieline.com said "Though obviously aware of the potential and prepared to really go for it, D’Onofrio came up with something that feels unfinished -- an interesting harmony that needs a better bridge." Most critical was Nick Pinkerton, of the Village Voice, who said that the cast are "no great shakes as actors", going on to say that the film "is cozily resigned to its novelty niche but an affront to fans of the genres it bowdlerizes."
