= Herbert Permillion =

American businessman (1943–2022)

- Born: May 3, 1943; New Orleans, Louisiana, U.S.
- Died: December 27, 2022 (aged 79); Richmond, California, U.S.
- Occupation(s): Business Owner & IBM Repairman
- Spouses: Ginger Dellenbolt; Juanita Daley
- Children: 3

Herbert Lloyd Permillion III (May 3, 1943 – December 27, 2022) was an IBM typewriter service team member and owner of California Typewriter Company, a longstanding typewriter repair shop in Berkeley, California. He was the subject of the documentary feature film, California Typewriter.

== Biography ==
Permillion was born in New Orleans to a line of jazz musicians, his father a big-band trumpeter. In his youth, his family relocated to Oakland, California, and later to Berkeley, California. He graduated from Berkeley High School in 1961. That year he was employed by Pacific Bell, and in 1967 joined IBM as a repairman.

Permillion married his first wife in 1967 and had two daughters, Candace and Carmen. The couple were divorced in 1978. Permillion remarried Juanita Daley until her death in July 2022.

He took ownership of California Typewriter Company, a typewriter repair shop on Shattuck Ave, in 1982. The business later moved to his own building on San Pablo Ave in Berkeley.

California Typewriter Company was notable for continuing to support typewriter enthusiasts for decades despite the technology being almost completely abandoned. Permillion continued to operate the business despite financial struggles. The business closed in 2020.

== Recognition ==
California Typewriter, a 2016 American documentary film directed by Doug Nichol, featured Permillion, his family, employees and the community members he influenced as the owner of California Typewriter Company.

== See also ==
- California Typewriter
