= Daughters (2024 film) =

- Release poster
- Directed by: Natalie Rae; Angela Patton
- Produced by: Lisa Mazzotta; Justin Benoliel; Mindy Goldberg; Sam Bisbee; Kathryn Everett; Laura Choi Raycroft; James Cunningham
- Cinematography: Michael "Cambio" Fernandez
- Edited by: Troy Josiah Lewis; Adelina Bichis
- Music by: Kelsey Lu
- Production companies: Object & Animal; Epoch Films; XTR; Park Pictures; Object & Animal
- Distributed by: Netflix
- Release dates: January 22, 2024 (Sundance); August 14, 2024 (Netflix)
- Running time: 107 minutes
- Country: United States
- Language: English

Daughters is a 2024 American documentary film directed by Natalie Rae and Angela Patton. It follows a group of incarcerated men and their daughters. It premiered at the 2024 Sundance Film Festival on January 22, 2024, where it won the Audience Award: U.S. Documentary. The film also won a 2025 Peabody Award.

== Premise ==
Four young girls whose ages range from 5-15 prepare for a special Daddy Daughter Dance with their incarcerated fathers, as part of a unique fatherhood program in a Washington, D.C., jail. Aubrey, Santana, Raziah, and Ja’Ana are participants in a program run by Patton's organization, Girls For A Change.

== Production ==
Rae contacted Patton about working together after seeing Patton's 2012 TED talk, "A father-daughter dance ... in prison."

The crew followed the girls for eight years, beginning in the first year the program held a Washington, D.C. dance.

== Release ==
The film premiered at the 2024 Sundance Film Festival on January 22, 2024, where it won the Audience Award: U.S. Documentary. A few days later, Netflix acquired distribution rights to the film.

== Reception ==
=== Accolades ===
Award	Date	Category	Recipient	Result	Ref.
Sundance Film Festival	January 28, 2024	U.S. Documentary Grand Jury Prize	Daughters	Nominated	
Sundance Film Festival	January 28, 2024	U.S. Documentary – Audience Award	Daughters	Won	
Sundance Film Festival	January 28, 2024	Festival Favorite	Daughters	Won	
Critics' Choice Documentary Awards	November 10, 2024	Best Documentary Feature	Daughters	Nominated	
Critics' Choice Documentary Awards	November 10, 2024	Best Director	Natalie Rae and Angela Patton	Nominated	
Critics' Choice Documentary Awards	November 10, 2024	Best New Documentary Filmmaker(s)	Natalie Rae and Angela Patton	Won	
Critics' Choice Documentary Awards	November 10, 2024	Best Score	Kelsey Lu	Nominated	
Critics' Choice Documentary Awards	November 10, 2024	Best Cinematography	Michael "Cambio" Fernandez	Nominated	
Critics' Choice Documentary Awards	November 10, 2024	Best Editing	Troy Lewis and Adelina Bichiș	Nominated	
Winter IndieWire Honors	December 5, 2024	Magnify Award	Natalie Rae and Angela Patton	Won	
Astra Film Awards	December 8, 2024	Best Documentary Feature	Daughters	Nominated	
Washington D.C. Area Film Critics Association	December 8, 2024	Best Documentary	Daughters	Nominated	
Celebration of Cinema and Television	December 9, 2024	Documentary Award	Natalie Rae and Angela Patton	Won	
Chicago Film Critics Association	December 12, 2024	Best Documentary Film	Daughters	Nominated	
San Francisco Bay Area Film Critics Circle	December 15, 2024	Best Documentary Feature	Daughters	Nominated	
St. Louis Film Critics Association	December 15, 2024	Best Documentary Feature	Daughters	Nominated	
Dallas–Fort Worth Film Critics Association	December 18, 2024	Best Documentary Film	Daughters	2nd place	
Florida Film Critics Circle	December 20, 2024	Best Documentary Film	Daughters	Nominated	
Alliance of Women Film Journalists	January 7, 2025	Best Documentary Film	Daughters	Nominated	
Cinema Eye Honors	January 9, 2024	Outstanding Non-Fiction Feature	Natalie Rae, Angela Patton, Lisa Mazzotta, Justin Benoliel, James Cunningham, Mindy Goldberg, Sam Bisbee, Kathryn Everett, Laura Choi Raycroft, Adrian Aurelius, Philip Nicolai Flindt, Michael Cambio Fernandez, and Kelsey Lu	Nominated	
Cinema Eye Honors	January 9, 2024	Outstanding Debut	Natalie Rae and Angela Patton	Nominated	
Cinema Eye Honors	January 9, 2024	Audience Choice Prize	Daughters	Nominated	
Directors Guild of America Awards	February 8, 2025	Outstanding Directorial Achievement in Documentaries	Natalie Rae and Angela Patton	Nominated	
Academy of Television Arts & Sciences	May 1, 2025	Television Academy Honors Award	A Netflix Documentary / An Object & Animal and Epoch Films Production / A Park Pictures and XTR Production / In Association with OPC, World of HA, Simpson Street, and Two One Five	Won	
Peabody Awards	May 1, 2025	Documentary	A Netflix Documentary / An Object & Animal and Epoch Films Production / A Park Pictures and XTR Production / In Association with OPC, World of HA, Simpson Street, and Two One Five	Won	
News and Documentary Emmy Awards	June 26, 2025	Outstanding Social Issue Documentary	Daughters	Nominated	
News and Documentary Emmy Awards	June 26, 2025	Outstanding Direction: Documentary	Angela Patton, Natalie Rae	Nominated	
