= Richard Polt =

Philosopher

- Born: Richard F. H. Polt; 1964 (age 61–62)

Academic background
- Education: University of California, Berkeley (BA); University of Chicago (MA, PhD)
- Thesis: Heidegger and the Place of Logic (1991)
- Doctoral advisor: Leszek Kolakowski

Academic work
- Discipline: Philosophy
- Institutions: Xavier University

Richard F. H. Polt (born 1964) is an American professor of philosophy at Xavier University in Cincinnati, Ohio. He has written about and translated works by Martin Heidegger. He and Gregory Fried edit the Bloomsbury Publishing book series New Heidegger Research.

Polt is also a typewriter enthusiast. He has written a book on typewriters in the twenty-first century, maintains a website on typewriters, and is a former editor of ETCetera, The Journal of The Typewriter Collectors’ Association. He appears in the 2016 documentary California Typewriter. He founded Loose Dog Press, a publishing house devoted to books of interest to typewriter users and collectors.

Polt also runs a literary society devoted to American writer Harry Stephen Keeler.

== Works ==
=== As author ===
- Heidegger on Presence (Cambridge: Cambridge University Press, 2025)
- Evertype: A Novel (Cincinnati: Loose Dog Press, 2025)
- Time and Trauma: Thinking through Heidegger in the Thirties (London: Rowman & Littlefield International, 2019)
- The Typewriter Revolution: A Typist's Companion for the 21st Century (Woodstock, VT: The Countryman Press, 2015)
- The Emergency of Being: On Heidegger's "Contributions to Philosophy" (Ithaca: Cornell University Press, 2006)
- Heidegger: An Introduction (Ithaca: Cornell University Press, 1999; second, revised edition, 2025).

=== As editor and co-editor ===
- Richard Polt and Jon Wittrock (eds.), The Task of Philosophy in the Anthropocene: Axial Echoes in Global Space (London: Rowman & Littlefield International, 2018)
- Gregory Fried and Richard Polt (eds.), After Heidegger? (London: Rowman & Littlefield International, 2017)
- Gregory Fried and Richard Polt (eds. and trans.): Martin Heidegger, Nature, History, State: 1933-1934, with essays by Robert Bernasconi, Peter E. Gordon, Marion Heinz, Theodore Kisiel, and Slavoj Žižek (London: Bloomsbury, 2013)
- Heidegger's "Being and Time": Critical Essays (Lanham, MD: Rowman & Littlefield, 2005)
- Richard Polt and Gregory Fried (eds.), A Companion to Heidegger's "Introduction to Metaphysics" (New Haven: Yale University Press, 2001)

=== As translator and co-translator ===
- Martin Heidegger, Being and Truth, trans. Gregory Fried and Richard Polt (Bloomington: Indiana University Press, 2010)
- Martin Heidegger, Introduction to Metaphysics, trans. Gregory Fried and Richard Polt (New Haven & London: Yale University Press, 2000; 2nd edition, 2014)
- Friedrich Nietzsche, Twilight of the Idols (Indianapolis: Hackett Publishing Co., 1997)
