= Flint Town =

- Genre: Documentary
- Directed by: Zackary Canepari; Drea Cooper; Jessica Dimmock
- Theme music composer: Plied Sound; Matthew Joynt; Nathan Sandberg
- Country of origin: United States
- No. of seasons: 1
- No. of episodes: 8

Production
- Production locations: Flint, Michigan
- Editor: Joe Peeler
- Running time: 34-47 minutes
- Production companies: ZC/DC; Anonymous Content

Original release
- Network: Netflix
- Release: March 2, 2018

Flint Town is an eight episode American documentary television series that was released on Netflix on March 2, 2018. The documentary focuses on the thoughts and conflicted emotions of police officers serving to protect urban areas of Flint, Michigan struggling with poverty, crime, financially strapped public services and the Flint water crisis. The series covers a period from November 2015 to early 2017, the same time frame as the 2016 presidential election. The department captured on-screen is down from 300 officers to 98 for 100,000 people, the lowest number out of comparably sized cities. Over the course of the episodes, the police faced a crucial millage vote and a city government wrangling over funding.

== Cast ==
- Bridgette Frost (born Balasko) – police officer; later officer, CATT (Crime Area Target Team) squad; aspires to be a Federal Investigator; later Homicide Detective
- Devon Bernritter – Captain
- John Boismier – K-9 Officer
- Esther Campbell – Sergeant
- Hillary Clinton – Democratic Presidential Candidate
- Jessica Dupnack – ABC12 News Reporter
- Robert Frost – Sergeant
- Timothy Johnson – Chief of Police, appointed by Mayor Karen Weaver
- Dion Reed – LERTA Cadet turned police officer, son of Maria
- Maria Reed – LERTA Cadet turned police officer, mother of Dion
- Bernie Sanders – Democratic Presidential Candidate
- Bill Schuette - Michigan Attorney General
- Lewis Spears – Police Reserve Volunteer
- James Tolbert – former Chief of Police, fired by Mayor Karen Weaver
- Donald Trump – 45th President of The United States of America
- Jazmin Tuttle – fiancé of Dion Reed
- Keith Urquhart – Sergeant, CATT squad
- Scott Watson – officer, CATT squad
- Karen Weaver – Newly elected Mayor of Flint
- James Wheeler – Field Training Officer
- Brian Willingham – police officer

== Episodes ==
No.	Title	Original release date
1	"Welcome to Flint Town"	March 2, 2018
As a water crisis erupts and a new mayor is sworn in, the understaffed police department faces Federal extortion charges while struggling to protect the city.
2	"Two Guns"	March 2, 2018
A new chief ushers in change as a presidential debate comes to town. A young cadet navigates training, while veteran Frost recalls a painful incident.
3	"The Rat Pack"	March 2, 2018
Chief Johnson's new team targeting high-crime area takes action, to mixed response from the community. Cadet Dion and his mother close in on graduation.
4	"Death and Homicide"	March 2, 2018
Flint police battle with a store that's a magnet for criminal activity. Dion has his first shift on the job. The officers react to the 2016 shooting of Dallas police officers.
5	"The Numbers"	March 2, 2018
Flint PD copes with anti-police sentiments. The city starts a volunteer community police program. Encouraging crime statistics bring cautious optimism.
6	"Devil's Night"	March 2, 2018
Presidential candidate Donald Trump visits Flint. As voters weigh renewing a police funding tax, Chief Johnson looks for other ways to raise revenue.
7	"Two Worlds"	March 2, 2018
Election Day arrives. As nervous officers await the result, it's business as usual on the streets. Trump's win exposes divisions in the department.
8	"The Stand Off"	March 2, 2018
Johnson clashes with the city council over the budget as crime stats head in the wrong direction. Balasko and Frost ponder their future together.

== See also ==
- Decline of Detroit
