= Paul H. Lysaker =

American psychologist

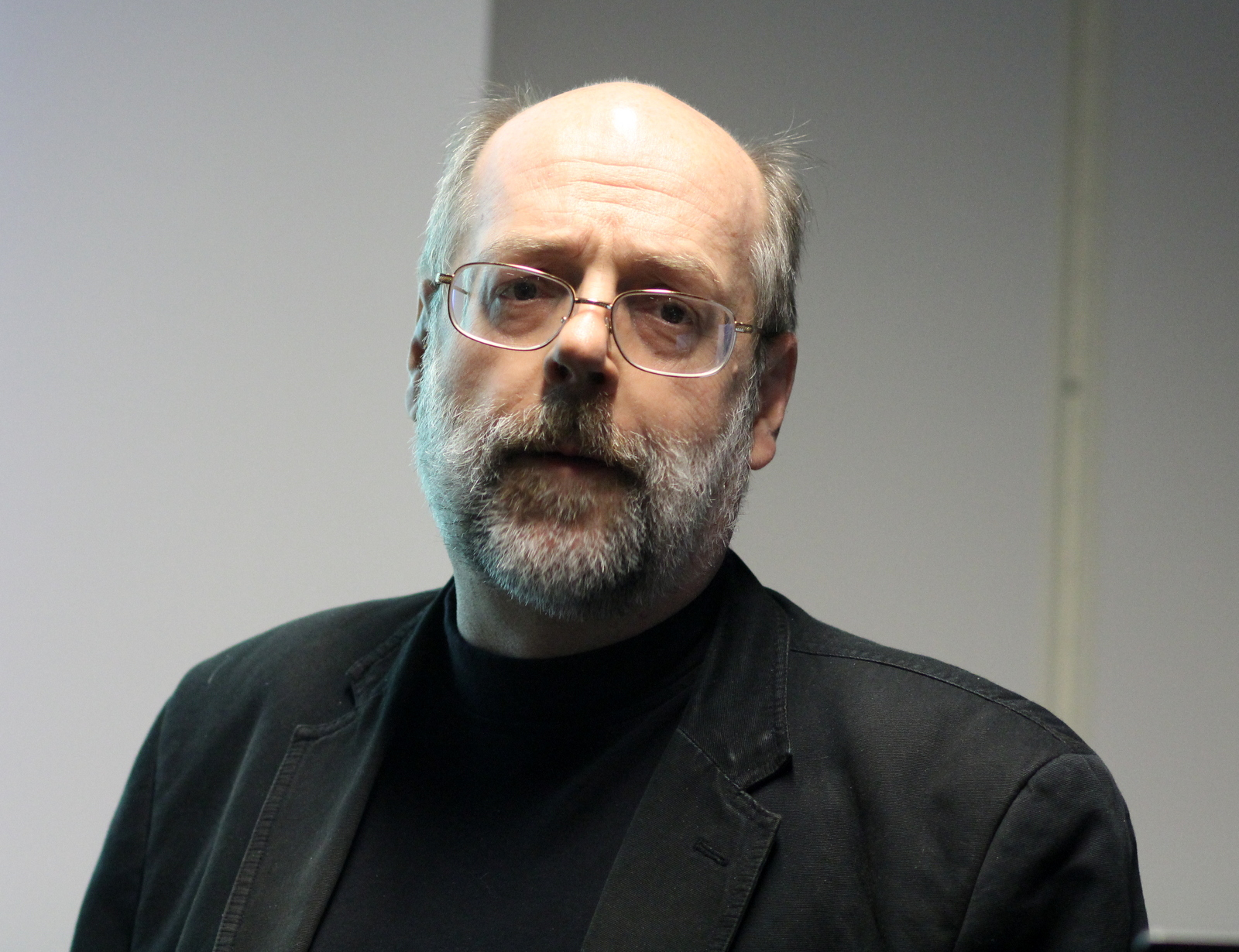
- Paul Lysaker in Stavanger, November 2013
- Born: February 15, 1960; Orange County, California
- Died: July 25, 2023 (aged 63); Indianapolis
- Spouse: Judith T. Lysaker
- Parent(s): Yvonne B. Lysaker, Richard L. Lysaker

Academic work
- Discipline: clinical psychology
- Institutions: Indiana University School of Medicine

Paul H. Lysaker (February 15, 1960 – July 25, 2023) was an American clinical psychologist and Professor of Clinical Psychology in the Department of Psychiatry, Indiana University School of Medicine. He is known for his work on developing and disseminating metacognitively oriented psychotherapy for individuals with psychosis.

Paul H. Lysaker was the developer of Metacognitive Reflection and Insight Therapy (MERIT), a metacognitively oriented treatment for persons diagnosed with psychosis.

== Books ==
- A Dimensional Approach to Schizotypy. Conceptualization and Treatment, with Simone Cheli (Springer, 2023).
- Recovery, Meaning-Making, and Severe Mental Illness, with Reid E. Klion (Routledge, 2017)
- Schizophrenia and the Fate of the Self, with John Lysaker (Oxford, 2008)
