= 306 Hollywood =

2018 American documentary film

- Directed by: Jonathan and Elan Bogarín
- Release date: September 28, 2018 (New York City)
- Country: United States
- Language: English

306 Hollywood is a 2018 documentary film directed by the brother-and-sister team of Jonathan and Elan Bogarín. It is about their experiences cleaning out their grandmother's house after her death. It was filmed on location in Hillside, New Jersey.
