= Kusama: Infinity =

- Theatrical release poster
- Directed by: Heather Lenz
- Written by: Keita Ideno (co-writer); Heather Lenz
- Produced by: Dan Braun; David Koh; Heather Lenz; Karen Johnson
- Starring: Yayoi Kusama
- Cinematography: Hideaki Itaya, Ken Kobland, Hart Perry
- Edited by: Keita Ideno
- Music by: Allyson Newman
- Production companies: Goodmovies Entertainment; Lenz Filmz; Octopus Originals; Parco Co. Ltd.; Submarine Entertainment; Tokyo Lee Productions
- Distributed by: Magnolia Pictures
- Release dates: January 21, 2018 (Sundance Film Festival); September 7, 2018
- Running time: 76 minutes
- Country: United States
- Language: English
- Box office: $360,931

Kusama: Infinity is a 2018 American biographical documentary film that chronicles the life and art of Japanese contemporary artist Yayoi Kusama, now one of the best-selling artists in the world, who overcame sexism, racism, and a stigma of mental illness to achieve international recognition relatively late in her career. Magnolia Pictures released the film on September 7, 2018.

The documentary was directed, written, and produced by Heather Lenz, co-written by Keita Ideno, and produced by David Braun, David Koh, and Karen Johnson.

== Awards ==
The film was nominated in the "Best First-Time Director" category in the 3rd Critics' Choice Documentary Awards at BRIC Arts Media. The film also competed in the 2018 Sundance Film Festival and San Diego Asian Film Festival.

== Reception ==
Allison Shoemaker of RogerEbert.com gave the movie three stars, stating that "As a study of an artist who, in the film’s telling, was nearly always ahead of the curve, it’s a surprisingly traditional approach. But Lenz’s frank, admiring approach adds a sense of clarity that gives the film an undeniable potency. Here is what she made, it says; is it not wondrous? Here is the hand she was dealt, it says; is it not unjust?"

Robert Abele of Los Angeles Times noted "Mostly, Lenz is committed to showing as much of Kusama’s considerable output as possible, often lovingly panned over with an admiring camera. Think an exhibition program at 24 frames a second. But “Kusama – Infinity” is also a genuinely felt portrait of the artist as a dedicated survivor, ever in service to her vision of the world and fighting for her place in it. And while Kusama-mania currently seems as endless as one of her colorful, pattern-rich artscapes, the artist herself soldiers on, one dot at a time."

Chloe Schama of Vogue noted: "In fact, if Kusama: Infinity has any underlying agenda it would be to position the almost 90-year-old artist as not just an original but a feminist original. Set against her biography, it’s a compelling case. At almost every turn, Kusama rejected the conventional choice... The film skims somewhat over how Kusama returned to prominence, perhaps because it’s so hard to think of why she retreated in the first place, so ubiquitous, lauded, and recognizable is her work today. The forces behind Kusama: Infinity probably realized they didn’t have to strain too hard to make the case for this singular, brilliant artist. She’d already made it for herself."

== Contributors ==
- Ed Clark
- Beate Sirota Gordon
- Eric La Prade
- Frances Morris
- Alexandra Munroe
- Carolee Schneeman
- Frank Stella
- Akira Tatehata
- Joshua White
- Jud Yalkut
- Lynn Zelevansky

== See also ==
- Mondo New York, a 1988 film about Manhattan performance artists
