= John Lysaker =

American philosopher (born 1966)

John T. Lysaker
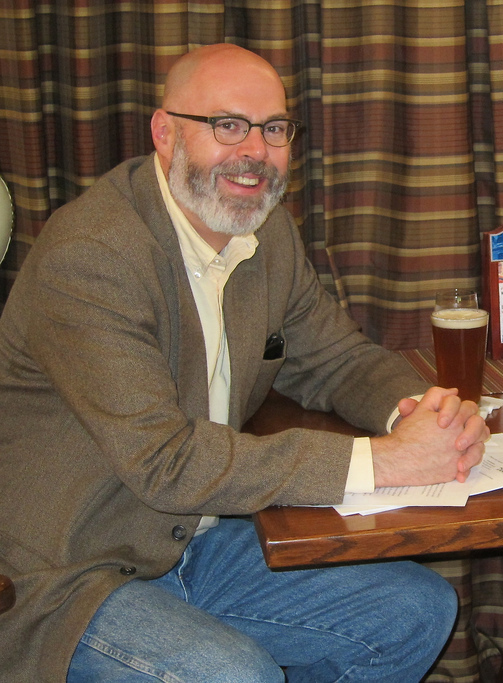
- Born: 1966 (age 59–60)

Education
- Education: Vanderbilt University (PhD), Kenyon College (AB)

Philosophical work
- Era: 21st-century philosophy
- Region: Western philosophy
- Institutions: Emory University (2009-), University of Oregon (1996-2009)
- Main interests: ethics, aesthetics, philosophical psychology
- Website: https://www.johntlysaker.com/

John T. Lysaker (born 1966) is an American philosopher and William R. Kenan Professor of Philosophy at Emory University. He is known for his works on ethics, aesthetics and philosophical psychology.

== Books ==
- Hope, Trust, and Forgiveness: Essays in Finitude (Chicago, 2023)
- Philosophy, Writing, and the Character of Thought (Chicago, 2018)
- Brian Eno's Ambient 1: Music for Airports (Oxford, 2018)
- After Emerson (Indiana, 2017)
- Emerson and Self-Culture (Indiana, 2008)
- You Must Change Your Life: Poetry and the Birth of Sense (Penn State, 2002)
- Schizophrenia and the Fate of the Self, with Paul Lysaker (Oxford, 2008)
- Emerson and Thoreau: Figures of Friendship, edited with William Rossi (Indiana, 2010)
