= Angela Patton =

Activist; creator of Camp Diva

- Born: 1971 (age 54–55)
- Education: ECPI University, Virginia Commonwealth University

Angela Patton is an activist for at-risk African-American girls and the CEO of Girls For A Change (GFAC), which works to support and empower young girls of color to feel seen, heard, and celebrated.

== Education ==
Patton studied and completed her Business Administration degree at ECPI University. At Virginia Commonwealth University, she received her certification in Non-profit Management.

== Work ==
Patton, a licensed practical nurse and doula, worked for the YMCA, the Children's Museum of Richmond, and the Richmond AIDS Ministry. She also served on the board of Richmond's East District Family Resource Center, which provides emergency assistance programs, education initiatives, and career development programs to those in Richmond's East End.

=== Camp Diva ===
The Camp Diva Leadership Academy, which operates in the Richmond, Virginia metropolitan area, reaches African-American girls, aged 6–14, through before- and after-school programs and summer camps. Patton founded Camp Diva in Richmond, VA, in 2004 to honor and remember Diva Mstadi Smith-Roan, a five-year-old African-American girl who died in a firearm accident earlier that year. Patton worked with Clover Smith, Diva's mother, to create a summer camp in her daughter's memory. During this five-week retreat, African-American girls, ages 11–15, engaged in camp activities such as cooking, sewing, dancing, and swimming. Through these activities, campers are taught social skills and introduced to entrepreneurship, career opportunities, and practical life skills. Camp Diva raised financial support for the costs of running the camp through hosting fundraisers and events.

=== Father-daughter dance in prison ===
In 2007, Camp Diva hosted their first father-daughter dance, which began as a suggestion from a camper. As the dance attendance grew each year, Patton realized that there was still a significant number of girls who could not participate at the "Date with Dad Dance" because their fathers were in prison. Patton worked with Richmond City's then-sheriff, C.T. Woody, to host a father-daughter dance within the walls of the jail. Incarcerated fathers participated in a 30-hour parenting class to earn the right to attend. On March 17, 2013, 16 inmates and 18 girls attended the first annual father-daughter dance in jail. This event became nationally recognized after being featured in a Washington Post article and in Patton's 2013 TEDxWomen talk, "A father-daughter dance...in prison," in which she explained the origins of the Daddy Daughter Dance. The video has more than 800,000 views.

Camp Diva continues to host their annual father-daughter dance at the Richmond City Jail. Other prisons, such as Miami's Federal Detention Center and the Omaha Correctional Center, have started their very own father-daughter dance for young girls with incarcerated fathers.

=== Merger with Girls for a Change ===
In 2013, Camp Diva merged with California-based Girls for a Change, a non-profit leadership and professional development program for girls, and Patton became GFAC's chief executive officer.

== Awards and recognition ==
Her work has been featured on NPR, ABC World News, and Inside Edition. In 2016, President Obama named her a Champion of Change" as part of the White House Council on Women and Girls' initiative on advancing equity for women and girls of color.

Patton has been awarded the title of "Virginians Making a Difference" and "The Cultural and Leadership Award". Richmond's Style Weekly named her to their 40 Under 40 list in 2010. In 2019, she was a Richmond Times-Dispatch Person of the Year Honoree and, in 2026, one of the paper's Women Who Drive Richmond.

Film director Natalie Rae approached Patton about collaborating on a project that would become the 2024 film Daughters after seeing the TED talk. The film premiered at the 2024 Sundance Film Festival, Daughters took home both the Festival Favorite honor and the Audience award in the US Documentary Competition. Angela Patton and Natalie Rae's 'Daughters' Takes Home Sundance Festival Favorite Award Rae and Patton won a Peabody Award for Daughters for "empathetic curiosity about the inner lives of young women as they come to understand the challenges of living in America". The film follows four girls as they prepared for, and attended, the first Daddy Daughter Dance held at a Washington, D.C. jail. With Natalie Rae, Patton was named a member of the 2024 BAFTA Breakthrough U.S. class.
