= Frida (2024 film) =

2024 documentary film

- Film poster
- Directed by: Carla Gutierrez
- Produced by: Sara Bernstein; Loren Hammonds; Alexandra Johnes; Katie Maguire; Justin Wilkes
- Starring: Frida Kahlo; Fernanda Echevarría del Rivero
- Edited by: Carla Gutierrez; David Teague
- Music by: Victor Hernández Stumpfhauser
- Production companies: Imagine Documentaries; Time Studios; Storyville Films
- Distributed by: Amazon MGM Studios
- Release dates: January 18, 2024 (Sundance); March 14, 2024 (United States)
- Running time: 87 minutes
- Countries: Mexico; United States
- Language: English

Frida is a 2024 documentary film directed by Carla Gutierrez about the life of Mexican painter Frida Kahlo. As Gutierrez's directorial debut, it was first shown at the 2024 Sundance Film Festival where it won the U.S. Documentary Jonathan Oppenheim Editing Award.

== Premise ==
Through her own writings and interviews, as well as brand-new animation, Kahlo chronicles and addresses her entire life and career from a first-person perspective. Many of the most pivotal and formative moments of her life are mentioned and/or detailed, such as her devastating accident as a passenger of a trolley car, her complicated relationship with the fellow Mexican painter Diego Rivera, her time spent in cities like New York City and Detroit, and her affair with the Russian revolutionary Leon Trotsky. Both animation and sound design are leveraged to further depict the complexity of Kahlo's psyche, making for a visceral and intimate look at her vast and changing senses of human desire, the state of the world in the twentieth century, and her own artistry. With a rich body of archival material with primary relevance and association with Kahlo, such as her own works as well as correspondences from her loved ones, a multifaceted and dynamic look at Kahlo's life and legacy appears.

== Production ==
Long before Frida was conceived, Gutierrez noticed the abundance of existing writing from the Mexican painter yet not a narrative told from her own words. She then approached Julie Cohen and Betsy West, the directors of RBG and Julia, for insight on how to make a larger-than-life documentary about a female icon. While some studios found the prospect of a Spanish-only film to be daunting, especially with its experimental elements in visuals and sounds, a few distributors eventually took on Gutierrez's vision for a directorial debut: a documentary sourced from Kahlo's own words.

The film draws upon many multimedia elements, including but not limited to voice acting, animation, and restoration of materials in old and antiquated formats. The words of Kahlo herself, taken from her own writing, are narrated by Fernanda Echevarría, and Gutierrez worked with several animators based in Mexico to add a visual counterpart to her film's sound. To shape and inform the timeline of Kahlo's life and career, Gutierrez drew upon American historian Hayden Herrara's 1983 book Frida: A Biography of Frida Kahlo and directors Karen and David Crommie's 1976 The Life and Death of Frida Kahlo. With permission, Gutierrez was given access to Herrera's research which she had used for his book. In Herrera's attic, Gutierrez found a diversity of transcripts, writing, and other primary sources.

Outside of Herrera's own research, among the archival materials used for Frida were collections of the Hoover Institution Library and Archives. Much of the footage used, specifically at Kahlo's Blue House, was taken by American photographer Ivan Heisler, who also managed to capture footage of Kahlo's hospitable encounters with Trotsky. Just in time for showing at the Sundance Film Festival, the Hoover Institution remastered their footage to 4K to provide the best possible quality for Gutierrez. Additionally used were the papers of Bertram D. Wolfe, an American communist and friend of Rivera who personally held many photos of Kahlo and Rivera, several of which are seen in the film.

== Release ==
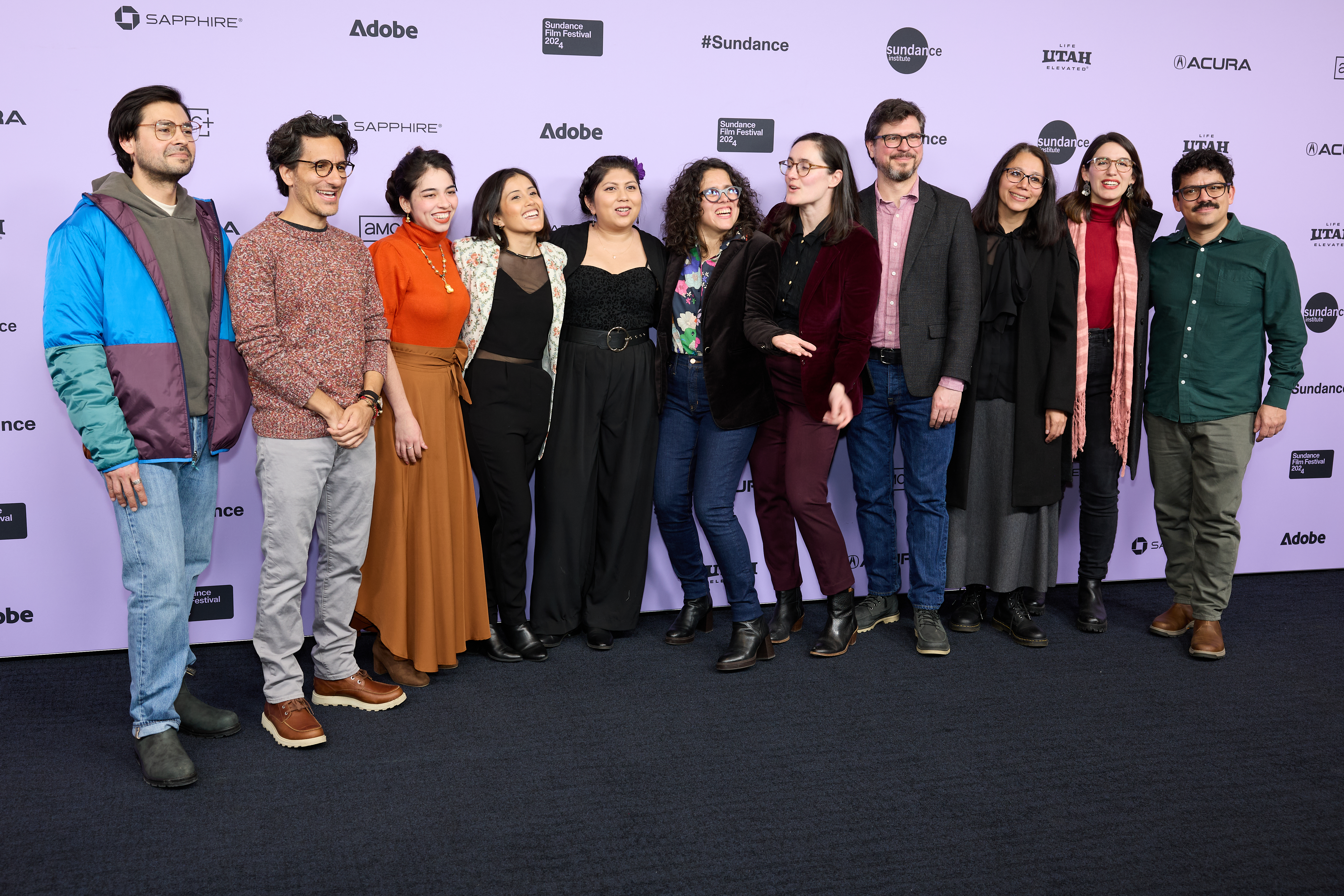
Film crew at the premiere of Frida at the 40th Sundance Film Festival on January 18, 2024

The film won the Jonathan Oppenheim Editing Award in the U.S. documentary category at the 2024 Sundance Film Festival. Gutierrez explained that not only did she direct Frida, but she also significantly edited it herself using a wide variety of Adobe tools. Her own editing was joined by a diverse production team of sound designers, musicians, and animators who further added new dimensions to Frida's composition.

== Reception ==
Many critics who watched Frida at the Sundance Film Festival in Park City, Utah found the documentary to be an ambitious attempt to depict Kahlo's life and career with both accuracy and novelty, though some were divided on whether Gutierrez's idiosyncratic techniques of production, as well as the points of Kahlo's life which she chose to highlight, were effective. Specifically, the choice to animate some of Kahlo's self-portraits appeared divisive. For some critics, however, the film excelled in its faithfulness to Kahlo's story, its ingenuity of craft, and its wondrous contribution to the body of work dedicated to capturing the enormity of the Mexican painter's life. On the review aggregator website Rotten Tomatoes, the film has a rating of 90% and an average rating of 7.5/10, based on 48 critics' reviews. The consensus reads: "Using the artist's own words to tell her fascinating story, Frida is an absorbing documentary for novices and faithful fans alike."

Sheri Linden, for The Hollywood Reporter, said,

Such razor-sharp perceptions and unapologetic pronouncements fuel Frida no less than the unsettling and beautiful images she conjured. Beyond the artistic pretensions she disdained, Kahlo noted that her canvases depicted her life, not the dreamscapes that were central to Surrealism. It was an exceptional life, and here at last is a film that not only honors her without resorting to sensationalism but that also lets her speak. At the end of Gutiérrez's fine film, you likely will feel the spell of a remarkable person's company.

Writing for ARTnews, Maximilíano Durón said that "the film unfortunately tells the same story that has already been told about Kahlo, without providing much new material along the way, other than some kitschy animations of her paintings." However, Durón found the emphasis on Kahlo's words, which have historically been underrepresented in exhibits and other tributes, to be refreshing and a certain positive. Furthermore, Durón argued that Gutierrez's film needed to have a different orientation to Kahlo's politics, citing the film's lack of commentary on her belief in communism as well as a sparse account of her relationship to Trotsky. Regarding the Mexican Revolution, Durón said,

To understand Kahlo and her art, it's crucial to view it against the backdrop of post-Revolution Mexico. She was born in 1907, three years before the Revolution began, but at a certain point in her life, she redated her birth to 1910 so that she arrived in the world along with the Revolution. At a time when the new Mexican government was fixated on constructing a national identity through the arts—look no further than the work of Los Tres Grandes, the painters David Alfaro Siqueiros, José Clemente Orozco, and her future husband, Diego Rivera—that is a significant detail, if not an essential one. Even if Kahlo was often dismissed as Rivera's wife or a second-tier Surrealist painter during her lifetime, she was just as committed to the cause of a new Mexico. That goes unmentioned in the film.

Though he complimented the film's feats, Christian Zilko from IndieWire additionally remarked,

While Kahlo's eloquence provides an excellent foundation for the film, it can be disappointing that her art isn't highlighted with the same prominence as her writing. Rather than show her actual paintings, the film relies on animated versions of them that bring her portraits to life. The execution is impressive, but it deprives viewers of the chance to see her work unvarnished while listening to her words. Perhaps the choice was made to add some motion into what otherwise could have been a static film that resembled a PowerPoint presentation. But there is something incomplete about a painting documentary that manipulates the actual work – especially when so much of the film's thesis rests on the idea that Kahlo deserves to be remembered on her own terms.

In comparison to past works depicting Kahlo, The Austin Chronicle's Austin Whitaker said,

But while Frida is intriguing, and undoubtedly a good primer to the life, mind and work of the artist, it's still a little overshadowed by Julie Taymor's visually enthralling and Oscar-nominated Frida, and not as structurally daring as Ken Mandel's hybrid docudrama Frida Kahlo: A Ribbon Around a Bomb. Keeping the words of Kahlo and Rivera in the original Spanish adds a certain immediacy, but that narration is not always quite so effectively applied. American newspaper reports are recited in a ridiculous fake '30s radio voice (you know the one), and why exactly are the words of French poet André Breton and Belgian surrealist René Magritte presented in thickly-accented English?

== Gallery ==
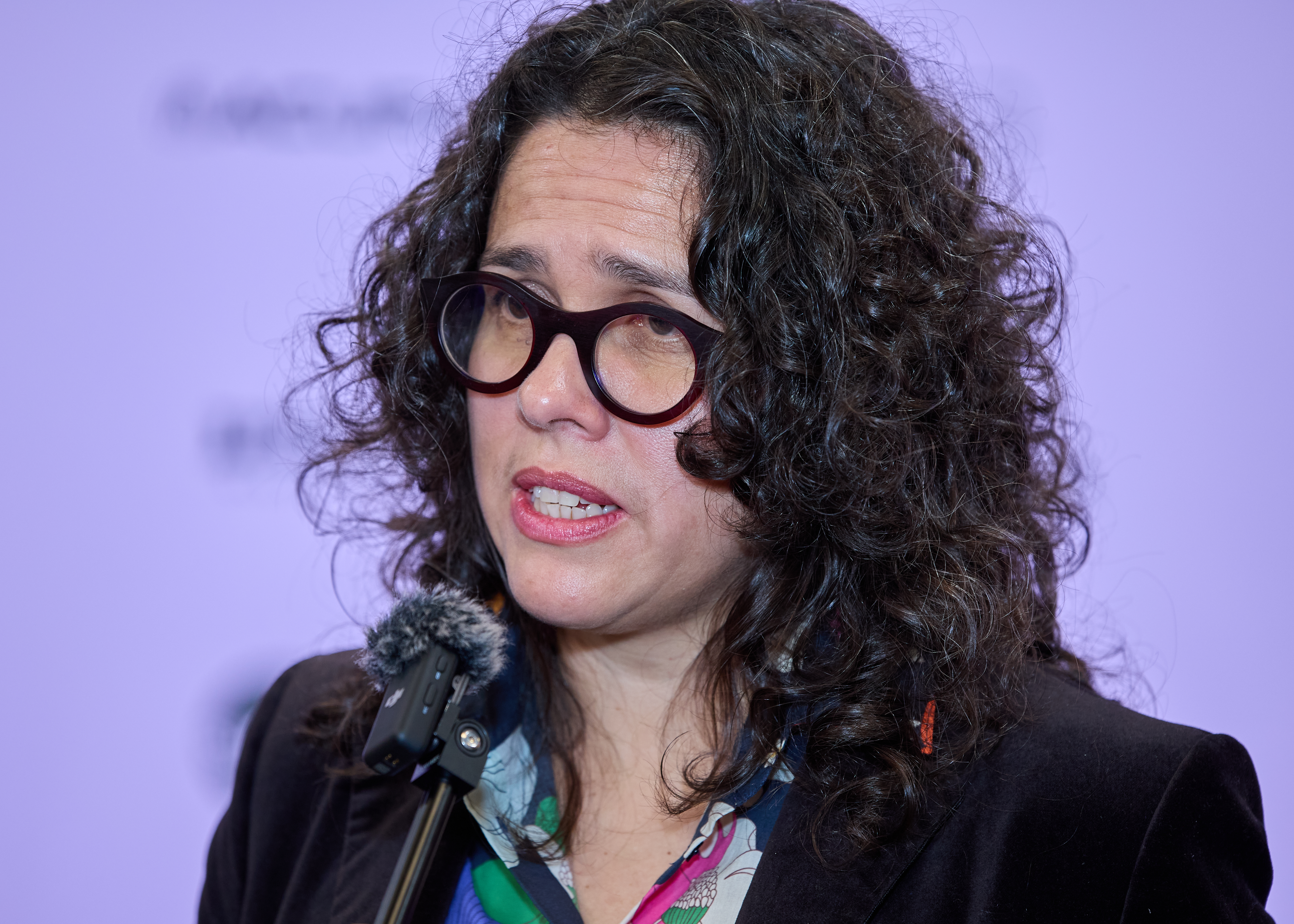
Director Carla Gutierrez

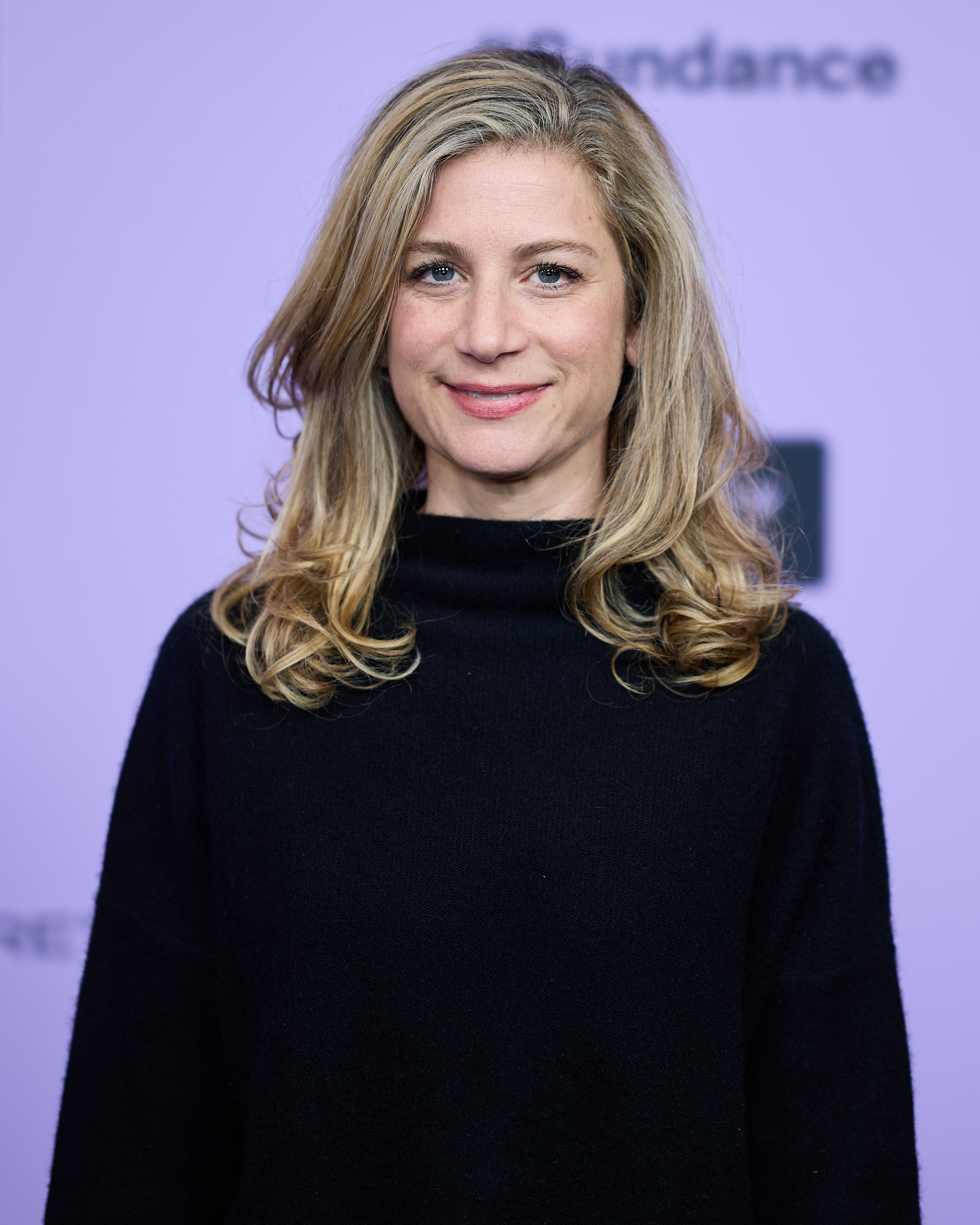
Sara Bernstein

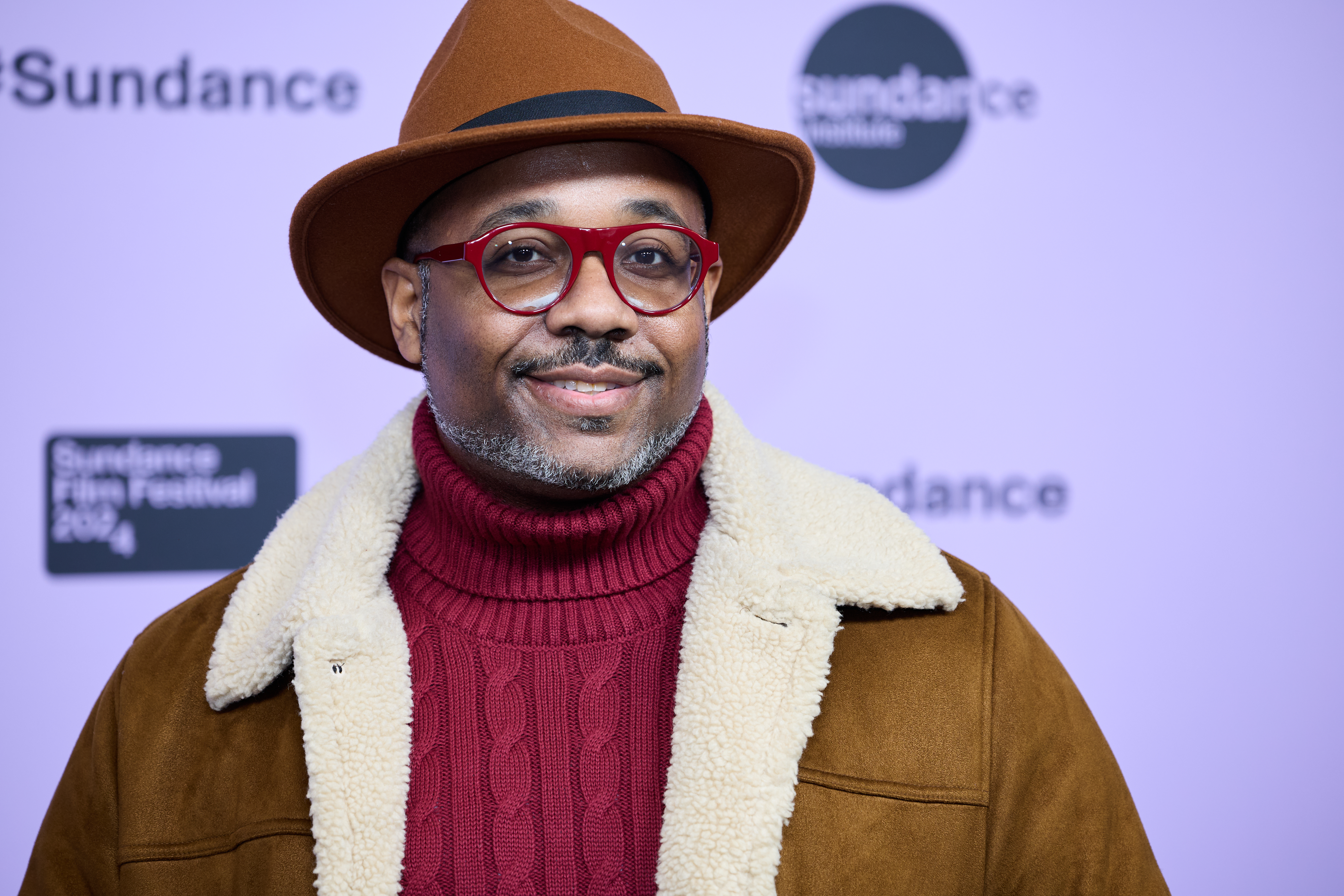
Loren Hammonds

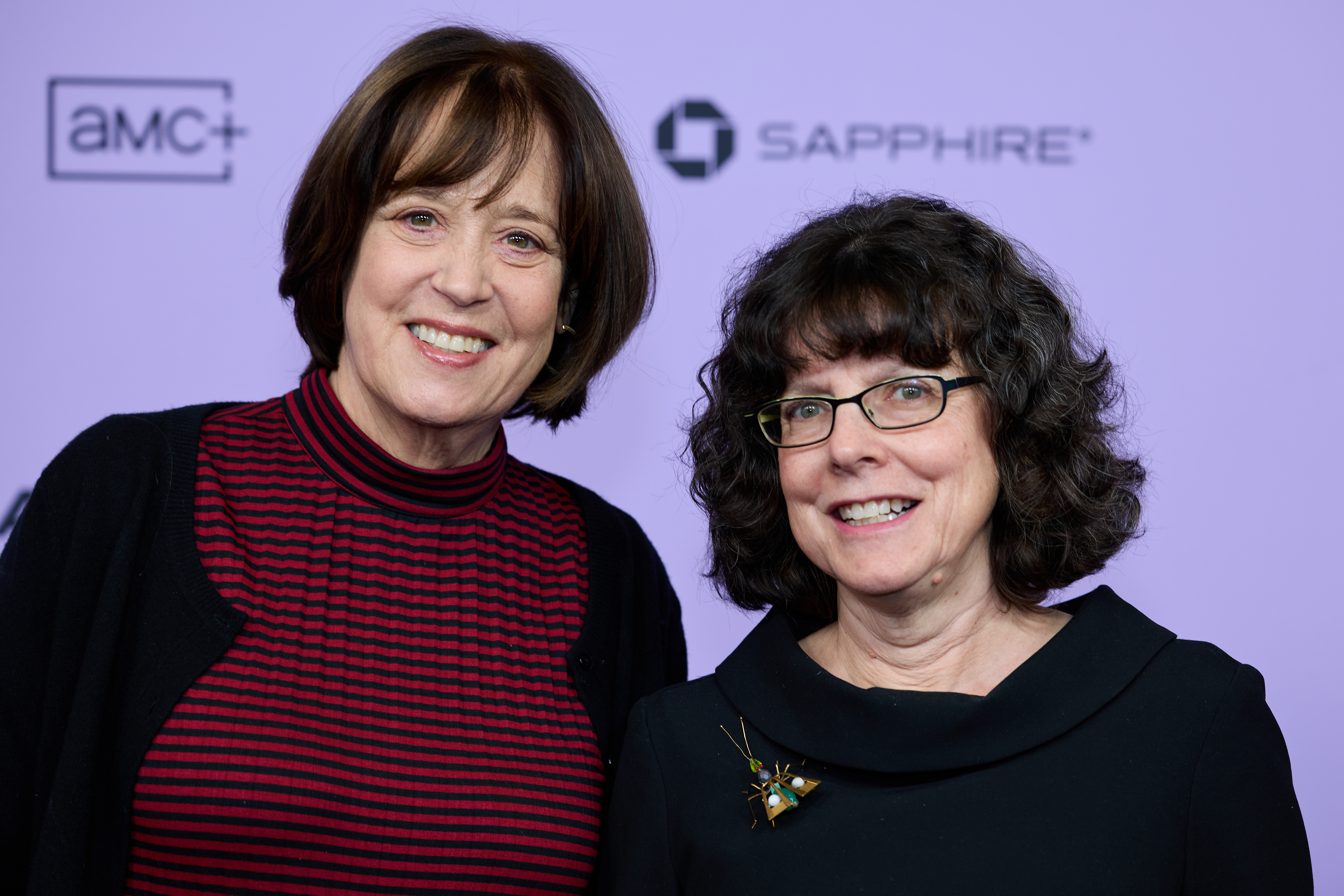
Betsy West and Julie Cohen

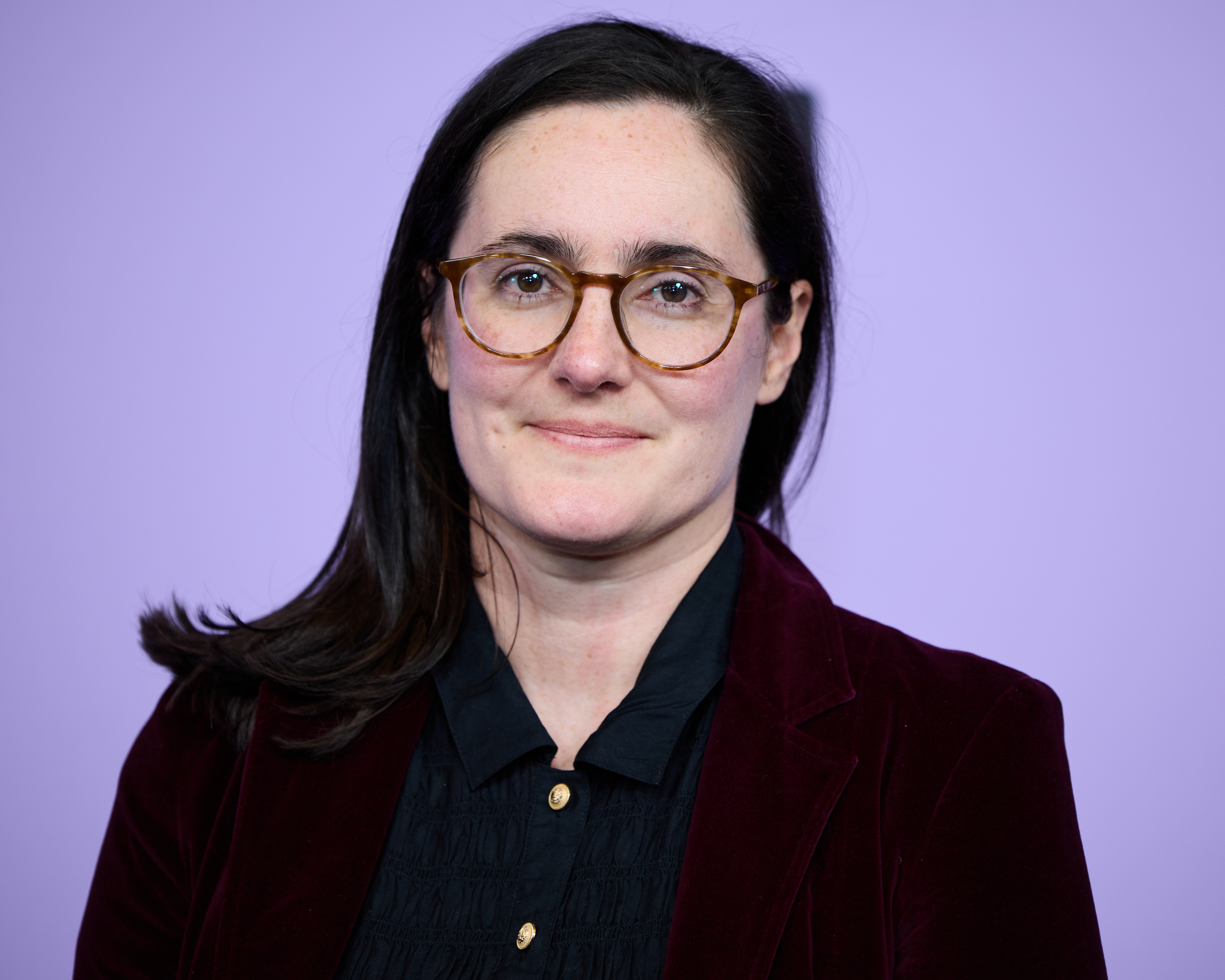
Katia Maguire
