= Jason Wirth =

American philosopher

Jason Martin Wirth
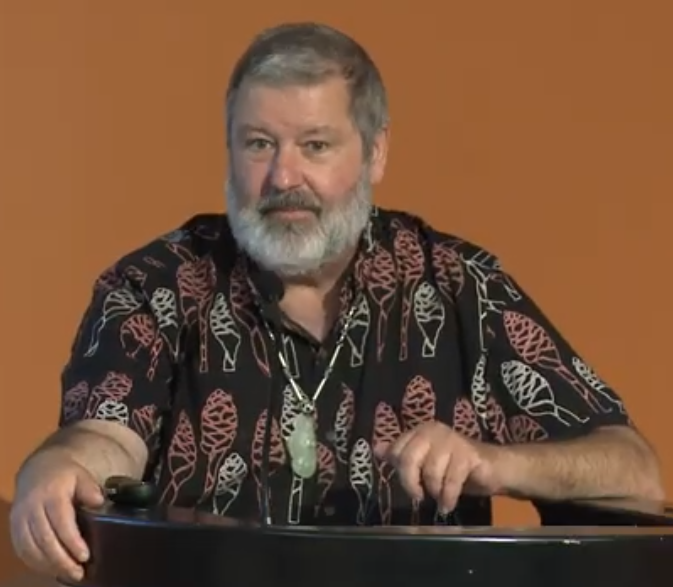
- Speaking at the San Francisco Public Library in 2025
- Born: February 3, 1963 (age 63)
- Awards: The Torch Bearer Award, John Tich Award

Education
- Education: State University of New York at Binghamton (Ph.D.)
- Thesis: The Conspiracy of Being: FWJ von Schelling and Conscientiousness before the Freedom of Philosophy (May 1994)
- Doctoral advisor: Dennis J. Schmidt

Philosophical work
- Era: 21st-century philosophy
- Region: Western philosophy
- School: Continental
- Institutions: Seattle University
- Main interests: moral philosophy, post-Kantian philosophy

Jason Martin Wirth (born 1963) is an American philosopher and professor of philosophy at Seattle University. He was the Theiline Pigott McCone Chair in Humanities from 2014 to 2016. He won The Torch Bearer Award in 2018. Wirth is known for his research on environmental philosophy.

== Books ==
- Mountains, Rivers, and the Great Earth: Reading Gary Snyder and Dōgen in an Age of Ecological Crisis, SUNY 2017
- Commiserating with Devastated Things, Fordham 2015
- Schelling’s Practice of the Wild, SUNY 2015
- The Conspiracy of Life: Meditations on Schelling and His Time, SUNY 2003
- Nietzsche and Other Buddhas, Indiana, spring 2019
