= Girls For A Change =

American non-profit women's organization

- Founded: 2002
- Headquarters: Richmond, Virginia
- Location: United States
- CEO: Angela Patton
- Website: girlsforachange.org

Girls For A Change (GFC) is a US 501(c)(3) organization based in San Jose, California, that seeks to empower girls and young women by inviting them to design, lead, fund and implement social change projects that tackle issues girls face in their own neighborhoods. It connects them with adult women trained to serve as volunteer coaches, who become role models and also advocates.

== History ==
Girls For A Change grew out of an initiative launched in Santa Clara County, California in 2000, and was officially founded in 2002 in San Jose, after the founders received initial help and training from Women's Technology Cluster. In 2003 it received a grant from the Draper Richards Foundation. In 2008 there was a national tour of Change Your World training sessions, an online GFC Action Network was launched, and the organization further spread to Richmond, Virginia. In 2013, CEO Whitney Smith stepped down and was succeeded by Angela Patton, the organization's program manager in Richmond, Virginia.

Girls For A Change in Richmond, Virginia, was founded in 2007 by African American girls seeking to improve the image of black fathers, and focuses on empowering girls of color.

== Activity ==
=== Girl Action Teams ===
In Silicon Valley, Phoenix, and Richmond, Girls For A Change offers free after-school programming for middle- and high-school girls. For a year, Action Teams consisting of 5-30 girls and two adult female coaches identify challenges in their communities and design and implement creative solutions to address them as a team following GFC's 7 Steps of Social Change. The year starts with a Girl Summit at which inspiring women speak and ends with a Completion Ceremony.

One Action Team led four high schoolers in Silicon Valley to found Girls Helping Girls, a non-profit that seeks to improve girls' education in countries around the globe.

=== Change Your World trainings ===
Starting in 2008, GFC began offering teaching and training at Change Your World conferences.

== Partnerships ==
Girls For A change has partnered with companies and organizations including:

- U By Kotex, Kotex's brand aimed at young women that also seeks to empower women and girls to celebrate their bodies and talk openly about periods and vaginal care—Girls For A Change received $1 for every signer of the "Declaration of Real Talk" on the brand website
- Miss Representation, a documentary film and associated non-profit that seeks to explore and offset disparaging images of girls and women and sexual stereotyping in general—Girls For A Change was one of the women-led organizations receiving a share of proceeds from screenings of the film
- Sephora
- Eileen Fisher, who provided a grant in 2009
- The Theta Nu Xi multicultural sorority
