= Kedi (2016 film) =

2016 Turkish documentary film by Ceyda Torun

- Kedi film poster
- Directed by: Ceyda Torun
- Produced by: Ceyda Torun; Charlie Wuppermann
- Starring: Bülent Üstün
- Cinematography: Alp Korfali; Charlie Wuppermann
- Edited by: Mo Stoebe
- Music by: Kira Fontana
- Production company: Termite Films
- Distributed by: Oscilloscope Laboratories
- Release dates: February 21, 2016 (Istanbul Independent Film Festival); February 10, 2017 (United States); May 10, 2017 (YouTube Red)
- Running time: 79 minutes
- Country: Turkey
- Language: Turkish
- Box office: $5 million

Kedi ([keˈdi], Turkish for 'Cat') is a 2016 Turkish documentary film directed by Ceyda Torun about the many stray cats that live in Istanbul. It premiered at the Istanbul Independent Film Festival on 21 February 2016 before being given a North American theatrical release on 10 February 2017. It debuted on the YouTube Red streaming service on 10 May 2017. It was released on DVD in the US on 14 November 2017. The film received critical acclaim, and grossed over $5 million. Time magazine listed it as one of its top ten films of 2017.

== Synopsis ==
Thousands of street cats live in Istanbul, the largest city in Turkey, as they have for centuries. Some are feral and fend for themselves, while others are tamer and are cared for by people. Kedi depicts these cats, and includes many interviews of the people who interact with them. It focuses on seven of the cats, who were named Sarı, Duman, Bengü, Aslan Parçası, Gamsız, Psikopat and Deniz.

== Production ==
The cinematographers constructed a special rig for filming the cats at street level. The filmmakers worked with local residents to get access to continue filming some of the cats when they moved from public to private property.

The director and crew initially selected thirty-five cats that the movie might focus on. They filmed nineteen of them, then chose seven to be featured in the final cut of the film.

== American release and box office ==
According to Susan King of the Los Angeles Times, "Kedi opened 12 February 2016 in New York City in just one theater and was the cat's meow with critics, scoring 96% fresh on rottentomatoes.com, and proving to be catnip to movie audiences, charming its way to an impressive $40,000 opening weekend and more than $60,000 for the first week in release. The film opened Feb. 19 in Los Angeles and scooped up an additional $80,000 in seven locations."

== Critical response ==
On Rotten Tomatoes, Kedi holds an approval rating of 98% based on 128 reviews, and an average rating of 7.8/10. The website's critical consensus reads, "Kedi is a cat fancier's dream, but this thoughtful, beautifully filmed look at Istanbul's street feline population offers absorbing viewing for filmgoers of any purr-suasion."

Joe Leydon wrote in Variety, "[Ceyda] Torun, a Turkish-born filmmaker now based in the United States, and cinematographer Charlie Wuppermann, her partner in the production company Termite Films, take their audience on a leisurely yet purposeful journey throughout Istanbul (where Torun was raised) to examine a local phenomenon dating back to the heyday of the Ottoman Empire: Thousands of cats roam freely virtually everywhere and anywhere, peacefully co-existing with humans who learned long ago not to assume they are the masters in this situation."

On NPR, John Powers wrote, "Kedi's stars, of course, are cats, and the film glides around Istanbul's back alleys, boho enclaves and rat-infested piers to show us the range of these characters.... As Torun's nimble camera follows the cats doing their rounds – filching food, catching rats, scaring off interlopers – the film offers a glimpse of something richer and more poetic. We see that these cats aren't merely wondrous creatures in themselves, but that they enrich the whole city. They give the people around them a vision of another freer, wilder, more spontaneous form of life, one that can be easily lost in a huge, stressful, rapidly modernizing place like Istanbul."

Mike D'Angelo wrote on The A.V. Club, "Inevitably, the film doubles as an intimate exploration of one of the world's most beautiful cities... Were Kedi strictly about Istanbul and cats, though, it’d be pretty banal. Instead, there's a fascinating therapeutic undercurrent to the interviews with human beings. Torun doesn't intellectualize this in any way; no experts show up to discuss our tendency to anthropomorphize animals, seeing ourselves in them. But several people talk frankly about having felt broken in some way, and about how taking care of homeless cats feels redemptive."

In The Washington Post, Vanessa H. Larson wrote, "The camerawork skillfully mimics a cat’s-eye view, with extended sequences filmed just over the animals’ shoulders using remote-controlled camera rigs that follow them as they saunter around, forage for meals and get into hissing matches. Interspersed throughout the film are also beautiful drone-captured aerial shots of Istanbul’s sprawling streets and the Bosphorus waterway, which impart a strong sense of place."

Glenn Kenny wrote in The New York Times, "There’s a good deal of projection in the verbal accounts of the animals' lives, but the movie, with its mobile camera low to the ground or looking down at cat-navigated rooftops, doesn’t do much to contradict the indirect anthropomorphizing.... The movie is replete with ingeniously constructed mini-narratives, including a turf war. The mesmerizing score by Kira Fontana, interspersed with well-chosen Turkish pop, is a real asset."

=== Accolades ===
Year	Award	Category	Recipients	Outcome
2017	Critics' Choice Documentary Awards	Most Compelling Living Subject of a Documentary	The cats of Istanbul	Won
2017	Critics' Choice Documentary Awards	Best First Documentary	Ceyda Torun	Won
2017	Critics' Choice Documentary Awards	Best Director	Ceyda Torun	Nominated
2017	Critics' Choice Documentary Awards	Best Documentary	Kedi	Nominated
2017	Critics' Choice Documentary Awards	Most Innovative Documentary	Kedi	Nominated
