= The Sentence (2018 film) =

2018 documentary film directed by Rudy Valdez

- Film poster
- Directed by: Rudy Valdez
- Produced by: Jackie Kelman Bisbee; Sam Bisbee
- Cinematography: Rudy Valdez
- Edited by: Viridiana Lieberman
- Music by: Sam Bisbee
- Production company: Park Pictures
- Distributed by: Home Box Office (HBO)
- Release date: January 20, 2018 (Sundance)
- Running time: 85 minutes
- Country: United States
- Language: English

The Sentence is a 2018 American documentary film directed by Rudy Valdez.

== Synopsis ==
Filmmaker Rudy Valdez shows how his family is impacted when his sister is convicted and sentenced to 15 years in jail.

== Release ==
=== Reception ===
The review aggregator website Rotten Tomatoes reported an approval rating of 90%, based on 20 reviews. Metacritic, which uses a weighted average, assigned the film a score of 69 out of 100 based on 9 critics, indicating "generally favorable reviews".

Kenneth Turan writing for the Los Angeles Times called the movie, "a personal and horrifying look at the effect of mandatory minimum prison sentences" Dennis Harvey from Variety magazine said that the documentary was "earnest but flawed", stating: "The subject is inherently engrossing, but a better documentary could (and probably will) be made about it." Dan Fienberg from The Hollywood Reporter wrote: "The Sentence is so committed to its concentration on emotion and heart that it's difficult not to get carried away, and it feels almost churlish to quibble with the intellectual responses it barely aspires to."

The Sentence received several awards, including a Primetime Emmy Award for Exceptional Merit in Documentary Filmmaking in 2019.
