= California Typewriter =

2016 film by Doug Nichol

- Film poster
- Directed by: Doug Nichol
- Produced by: John Benet; Doug Nichol
- Starring: Tom Hanks; John Mayer; Sam Shepard; David McCullough
- Cinematography: Doug Nichol
- Edited by: Doug Nichol
- Production company: American Buffalo Pictures
- Distributed by: Gravitas Ventures
- Release date: September 2, 2016 (Telluride Film Festival)
- Running time: 103 minutes
- Country: United States
- Language: English
- Box office: $218,563

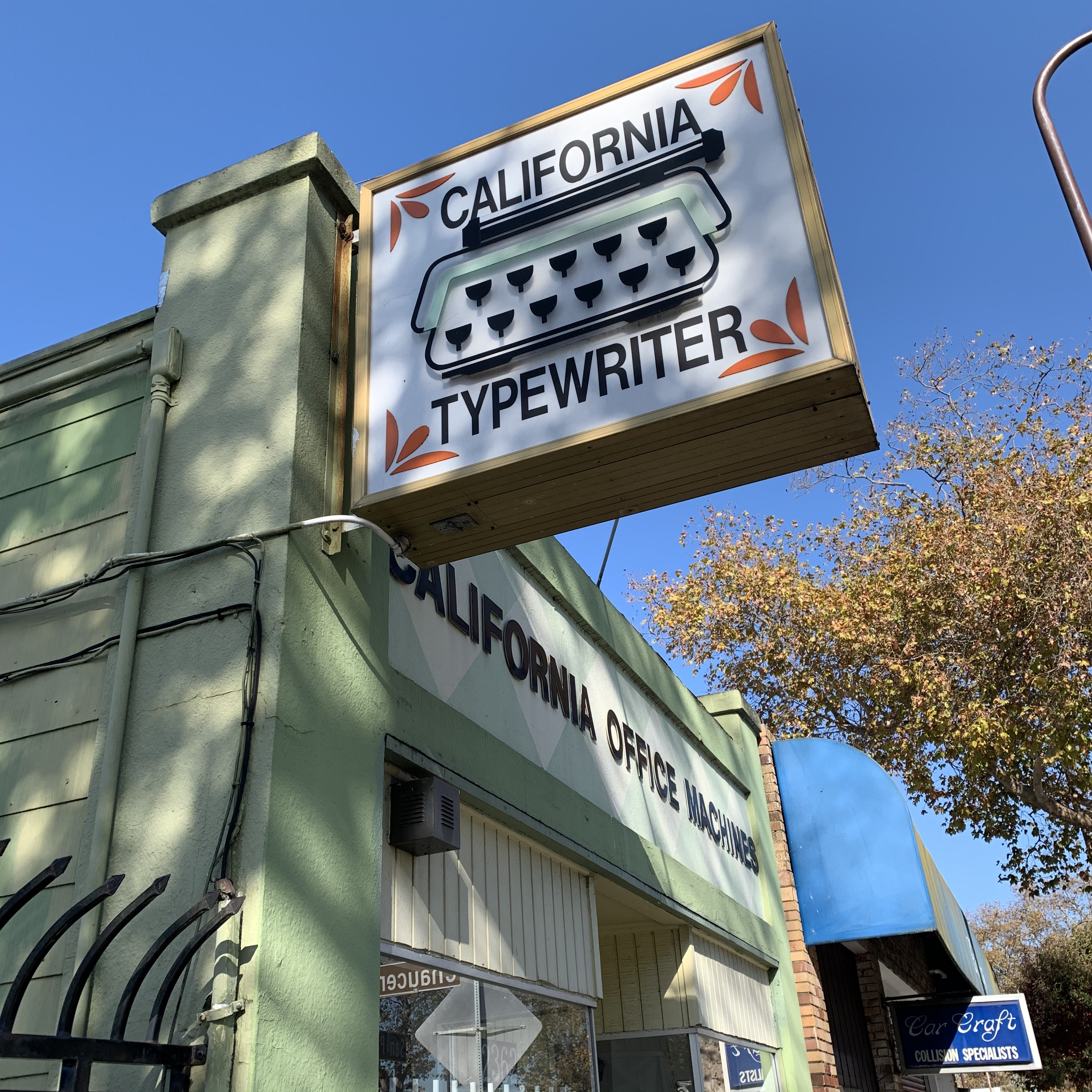
Eponymous California Typewriter store in Berkeley, California

California Typewriter is a 2016 American documentary film directed by Doug Nichol.

== Synopsis ==
The film explores the mythology attached to the typewriter, as various obsessives (including Tom Hanks, John Mayer, David McCullough and Sam Shepard) celebrate the physicality of the typewriter both as object and means of summoning the creative spirit. It also documents the struggles of the typewriter repair shop California Typewriter.

== Cast ==
The following people appeared in California Typewriter:

- Silvi Alcivar
- Ken Alexander
- Tom Hanks
- Martin Howard
- Jeremy Mayer
- John Mayer
- David McCullough
- Jett Morton
- Herbert Permillion
- Richard Polt
- Anthony Rocco
- Sam Shepard
- Darren Wershler
- Mason Williams

== Reception ==
The film premiered at the 2016 Telluride Film Festival and was released theatrically to critical acclaim. On review aggregator Rotten Tomatoes, the film holds an approval rating of 100% based on 40 reviews, with an average rating of 8.10/10. The website's critical consensus reads, "California Typewriter is an affectionate, nostalgic love letter to the typed word from enthusiasts and experts alike." On Metacritic, the film has a weighted average score of 80 out of 100 based on 14 critics, indicating "generally favorable" reviews.

Owen Gleiberman of Variety wrote, "The movie is a quaintly ingenious meditation on what the digital era is doing to us — how it has taken us a step away from reality, even as it's made everything easier."
