= Ceyda Torun =

Turkish documentary film director

- Born: Istanbul, Turkey
- Education: Boston University
- Occupations: Film director; Film producer
- Known for: Kedi

Ceyda Torun is a Turkish-born documentary filmmaker and producer. She is best known for directing and producing the 2016 documentary film Kedi, which follows street cats and the people who interact with them in Istanbul.

== Early life and education ==
Torun was born in Istanbul. Her family moved to Amman, Jordan, when she was eleven, and she later moved to the United States, where she attended high school. She studied anthropology at Boston University.

After graduating from Boston University, Torun returned to Istanbul and worked as an assistant to director Reha Erdem. She later returned to the United States, where she co-founded the production company Termite Films with cinematographer Charlie Wuppermann.

== Career ==
Torun directed and produced the documentary film Kedi. The film was shot in Istanbul and follows seven street cats and the people whose lives intersect with theirs.

Kedi received four nominations at the 2017 Critics' Choice Documentary Awards, including a nomination for Best Director for Torun. The film won Best First Documentary.

The film also received coverage for its theatrical performance in the United States. The Los Angeles Times reported that Kedi had surpassed $570,000 at the North American box office during its fourth weekend of release.

== Filmography ==
Year	Title	Role
2016	Kedi	Director, producer

== Awards and nominations ==
Year	Award	Category	Result
2017	Critics' Choice Documentary Awards	Best Director	Nominated
2017	Critics' Choice Documentary Awards	Best First Documentary	Won by Kedi
