= The Last of the Sea Women =

2024 documentary film

- Promotional release poster
- Directed by: Sue Kim
- Produced by: Erika Kennair; Sue Kim; Malala Yousafzai
- Cinematography: Iris Ng; Eunsoo Cho; Justin Turkowski
- Edited by: Erin Casper; Stacy Kim; Yeong-a Kim
- Music by: Jang Young Gyu
- Production companies: A24; Extracurricular
- Distributed by: Apple TV+
- Release date: September 8, 2024 (TIFF)
- Running time: 87 minutes
- Country: United States
- Languages: English; Korean

The Last of the Sea Women is an American documentary film, directed by Sue Kim and released in 2024. The film profiles the haenyeo, a declining community of women in Jeju, South Korea, who support themselves by free-diving in the ocean to collect seafood.

Much of the film concentrates on the community of haenyeo, all of them over 60, on Jeju, but later we learn that on Geoje island, 150 miles away, there are some younger haenyeo, in their 20s and 30s, who continue the tradition and have popular social media profiles.

The lives of the haenyeo are seen in a more political and international context when Japan announces a plan to release irradiated water from the Fukushima Daiichi Nuclear Power Plant into the ocean, which might threaten the health or the livelihood of the women.

The film premiered at the 2024 Toronto International Film Festival, where it was named the winner of the NETPAC Prize.

== Critical reception ==
The film has a 97% rating on Rotten Tomatoes based on 34 reviews, and 63 on Metacritic from 4 reviews, with a user rating of 6.7.

On RogerEbert.com Marya E. Gates wrote: "Aside from its breathtaking underwater cinematography, Kim’s documentary is very plain in execution. At home and on the land, she uses simple camerawork to follow their everyday lives and a basic straight-to-camera interview style to capture their stories. However, this choice allows the poetic words of these women to remain the focus, and the power of their dedication to their calling and their passionate pleas for a better future to ring out as a clarion call for all of us."

Peter Bradshaw in The Guardian expressed frustration with unanswered questions, and wrote that the film "blandly veers away" from them "in favour of images of haenyeo smilingly doing their work".

The documentary's depiction of haenyeo's lives has been criticized by writer Lisa Kwon as uni-dimensional: "Any attempt at a reflection on the contemporary daily lives of Jeju Island inhabitants without acknowledgement of its history feels empty and self-serving. Most attempts lapse into negligence: well-wishers arrive at the archipelago to gaze upon the modern haenyeo, ask uncritical questions about their histories, and, at worst, drive unchecked tourism."
