= Charlie Hamilton James =

British photographer and television producer

- Born: July 1973 (age 52)
- Occupations: Television cameraman and presenter
- Television: Halcyon River Diaries; I Bought a Rainforest
- Spouse: Philippa Forrester (m. 2004; div. 2020)
- Children: 3
- Awards: Young Wildlife Photographer of the Year 91/92; Royal Television Society medal for cinematography
- Website: charliehamiltonjames.com

Charlie Hamilton James (Note: Surname is the double-barrelled Hamilton James, not James) (born July 1973) is an English photographer, television cameraman and presenter, specialising in wildlife subjects. He started his career at 16, working on David Attenborough's The Trials of Life. His work has since been commissioned by National Geographic Magazine, the BBC's Springwatch/Autumnwatch shows and The Natural World.

His first film made when he was just 26, was My Halcyon River. Following its success, in 2001 he set up a production company, Halcyon Media, which specialises in wildlife productions. In 2007 he produced An Otter in the Family, a short documentary series about the adoption of an otter cub called Grace and his attempts to raise her as a wild animal to be released into the wild. He also produced the four-part Halcyon River Diaries, the first episode of which was broadcast on 16 May 2010 on BBC One. The series follows the wildlife found near his home. An additional episode was shown at Christmas 2010.

Charlie lives in Wyoming, US having moved from Bath in 2015. He has three sons, all three have appeared in his television programmes.

During the week of 30 May – 3 June 2011, Hamilton James presented a segment, comprising pre-recorded video and live commentary to camera, on the reintroduction of beavers to the United Kingdom, as part of the BBC's Springwatch. In June 2014 the TV series I Bought a Rainforest, about his £6,000 purchase of 100 acres of Peruvian rain forest, was screened by the BBC.

== Awards ==
He was Wildlife Cameraman of the Year's 'Young Wildlife Photographer of the Year 91/92' and was nominated in three categories for Wildlife Cameraman of the Year in 2007. He is also a Royal Television Society medal winner for cinematography.

== Bibliography ==
- Hamilton James, Charlie (1995). Kingfishers. Colin Baxter Photography. ISBN 978-1-900455-25-1.
- Hamilton James, Charlie (2005). The Matewix. HarperCollins. ISBN 978-0-00-717690-8. (a satirical look at The Matrix film trilogy)
- Hamilton James, Charlie (2009). Kingfisher: Tales from the Halcyon River. Evans Mitchell Books. ISBN 978-1-901268-38-6.
- Hamilton James, Charlie; Forrester, Philippa (2010). Halcyon River Diaries. Preface Publishing. ISBN 978-1-84809-225-9.

=== DVDs ===
Some of Hamilton James' programmes are available commercially:

- Natural World – On the Trail of Tarka, BBC
- Halcyon River Diaries
