= 18th Cinema Eye Honors =

- Date: January 9, 2025
- Location: New York Academy of Medicine, East Harlem, New York
- Most wins: No Other Land (3)
- Most nominations: Film: Sugarcane (6); Broadcast: Girls State and Ren Faire (3)
- Website: cinemaeyehonors.com

The 18th Cinema Eye Honors, destined to recognize outstanding artistry and craft in nonfiction filmmaking of 2024, took place at the New York Academy of Medicine in East Harlem, New York on January 9, 2025.

The broadcast categories as well as the Short Films shortlist, the Audience Choice Prize longlist and the recipients for The Unforgettables, were announced on October 24, 2024. Two programs led the broadcast nominations: Apple TV+ film Girls State, which follows a group of teenage girls during a leadership program named Girl State, and HBO series Ren Faire, which explores a succession crisis at the Texas Renaissance Festival. Both received three nominations.

Later, on November 14, 2024, the film categories were announced. Sugarcane, which investigates the Canadian Indian residential school system, led the nominations with six. Following it, were two films with five nominations each: No Other Land, which shows the destruction of a Palestinian community in the occupied West Bank, which had been resisting forced displacement following the declaration of an Israeli "firing zone" on their land; and Eno, which explores the career of English musician Brian Eno. The Academy Award-winning 1974 documentary film Hearts and Minds, which covers the Vietnam War, was honored with the Legacy Award.

== Winners and nominees ==
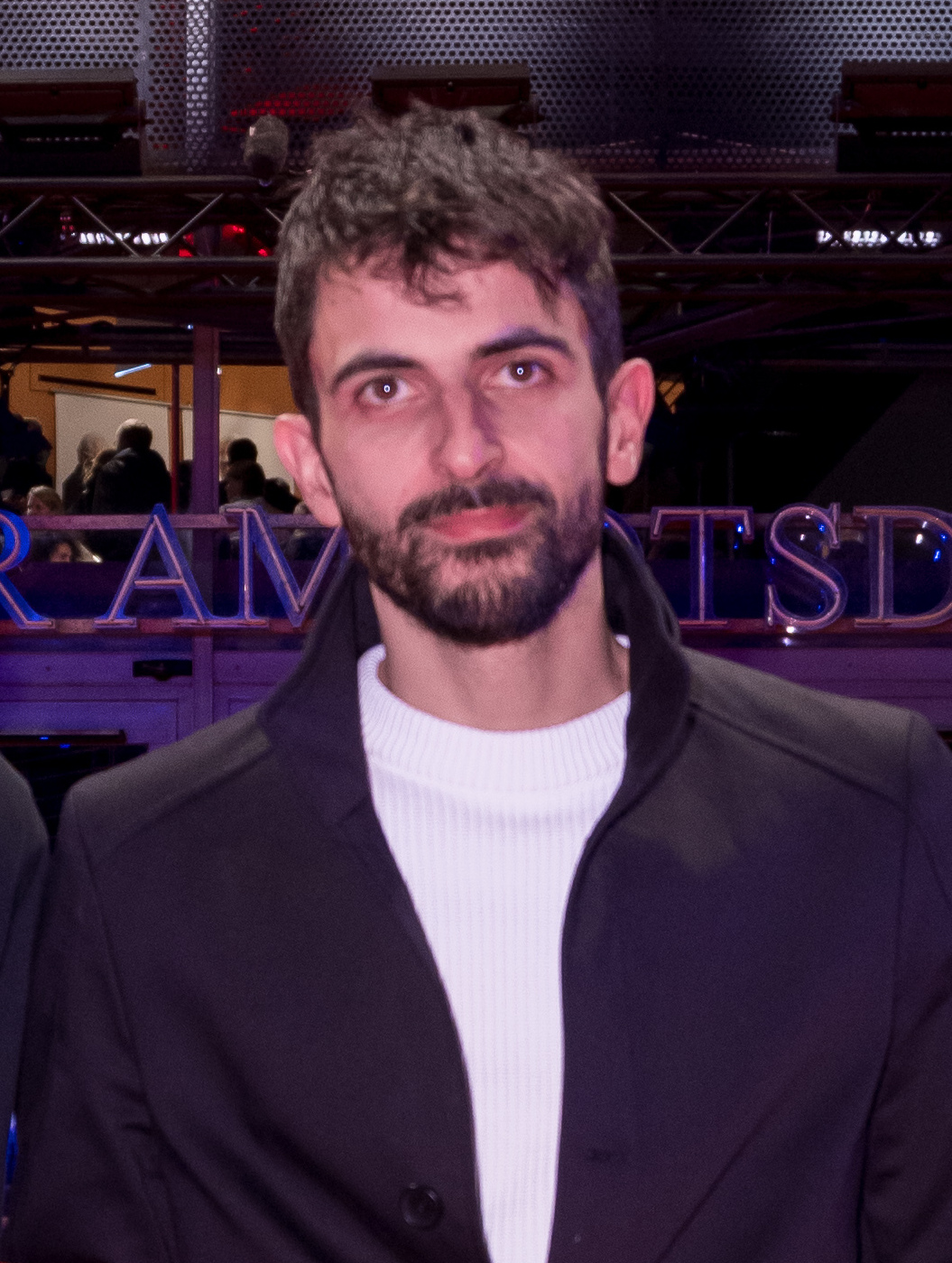
Yuval Abraham, Outstanding Non-Fiction Feature co-winner

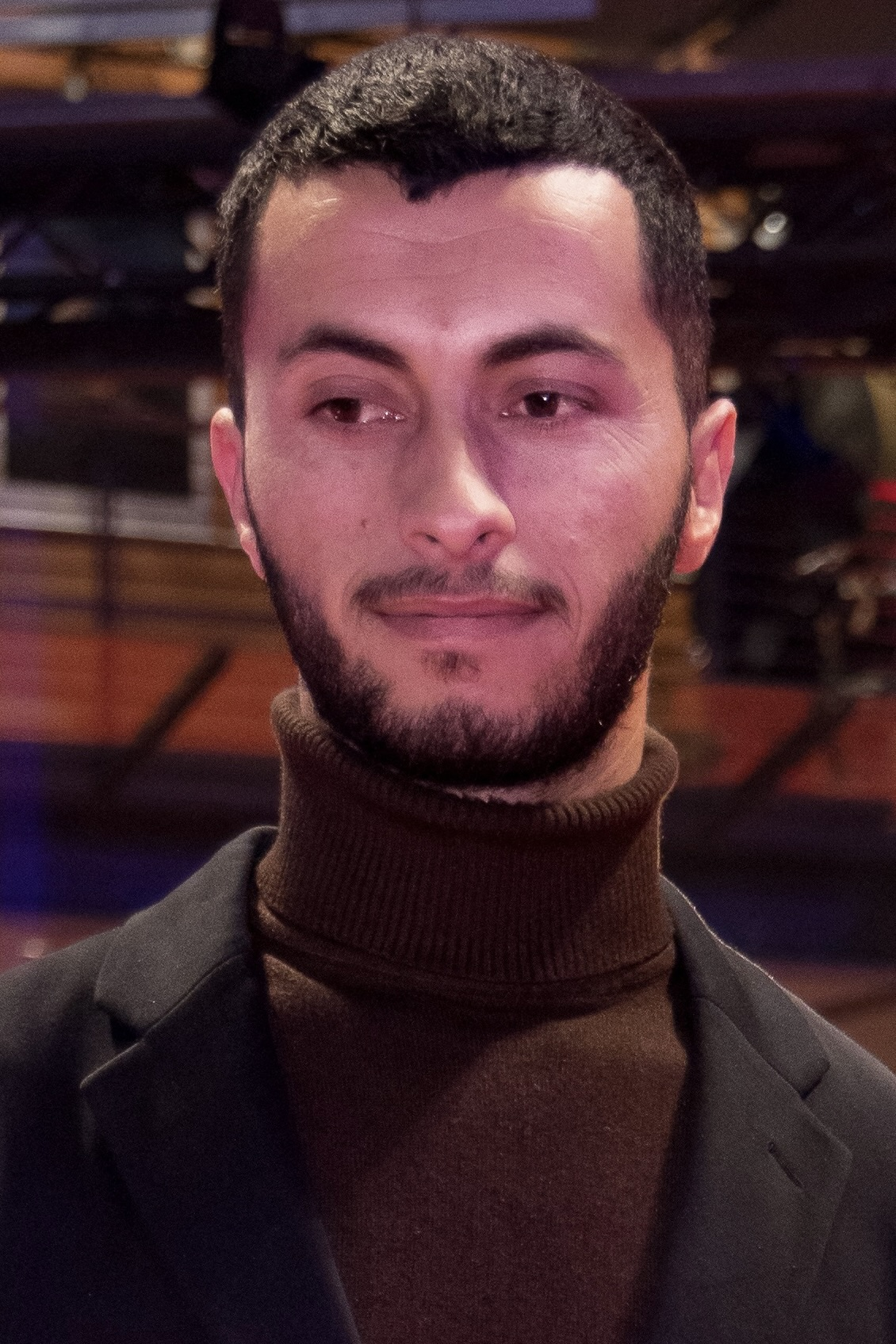
Basel Adra, Outstanding Non-Fiction Feature co-winner

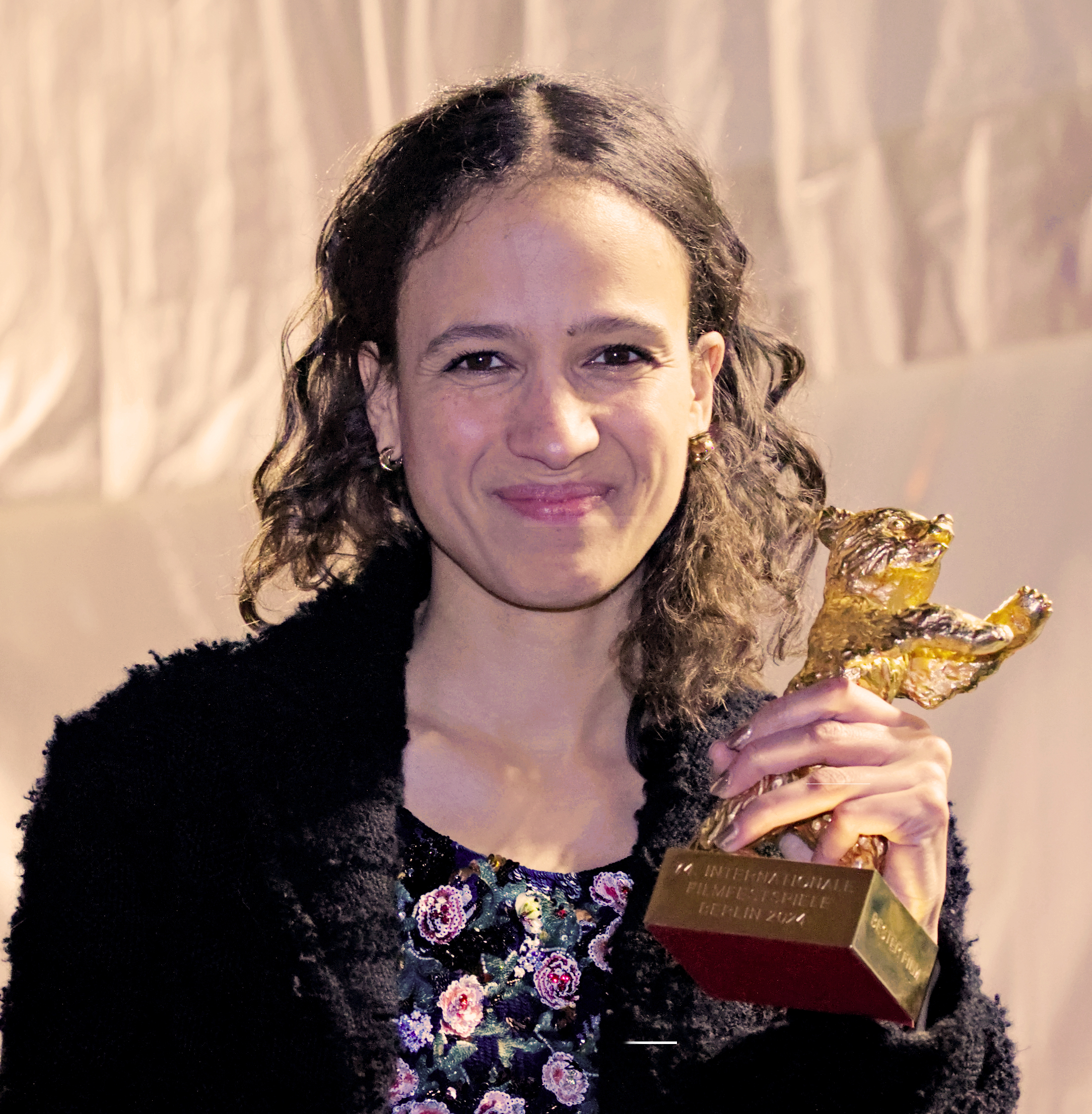
Mati Diop, Outstanding Direction winner

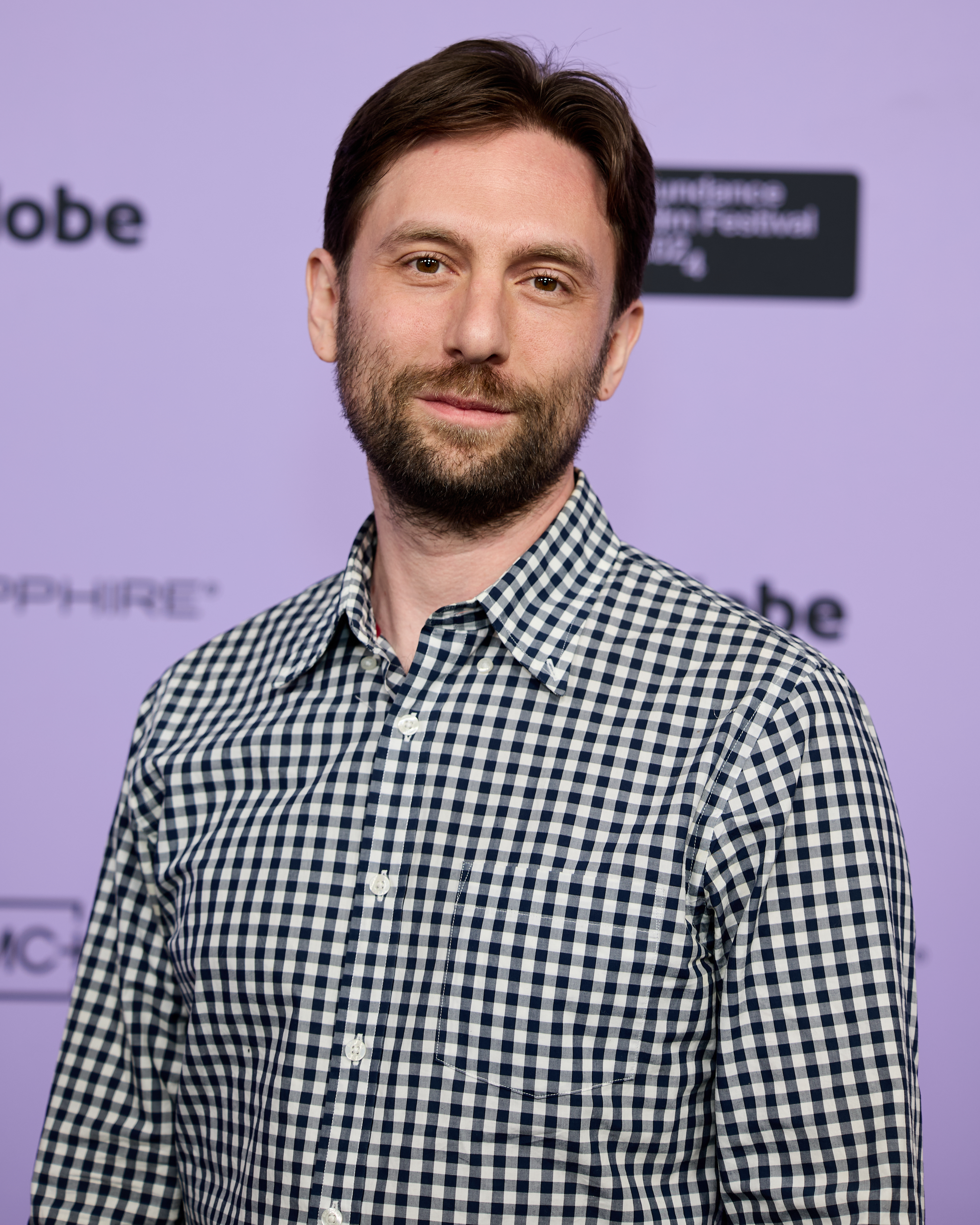
Brendan Bellomo, Audience Choice Prize co-winner

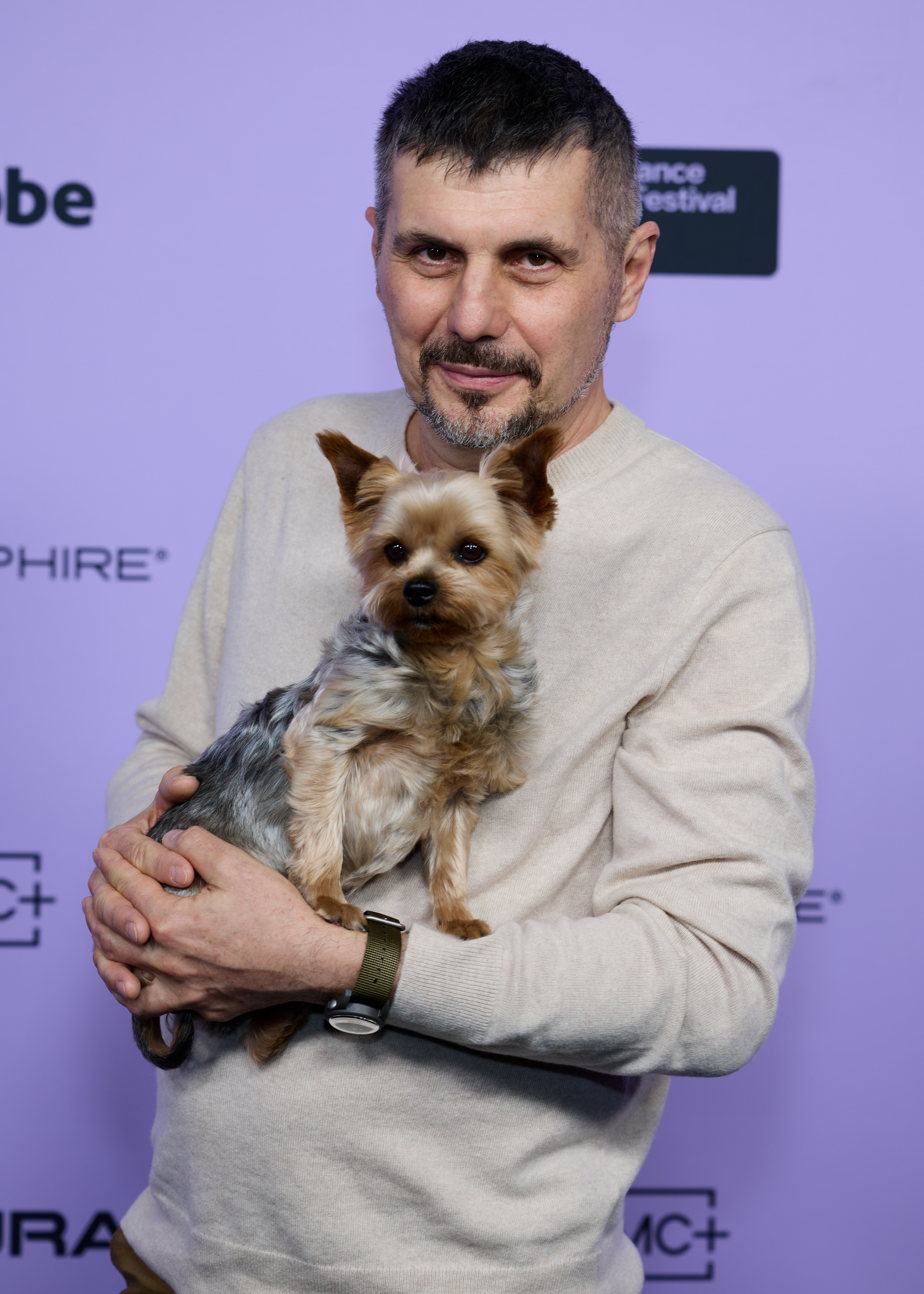
Slava Leontyev, Audience Choice Prize co-winner

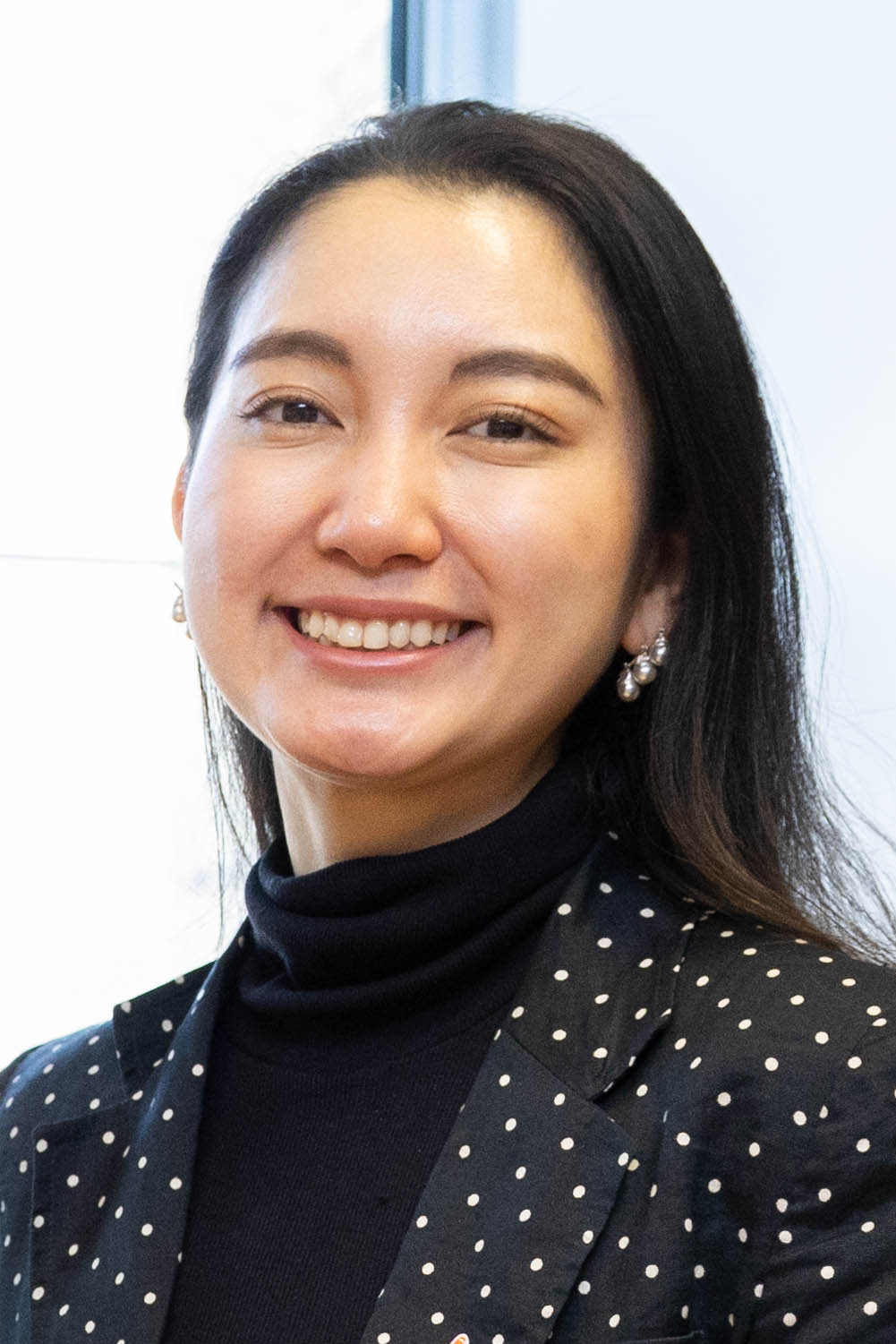
Shiori Itō, The Unforgettables honoree

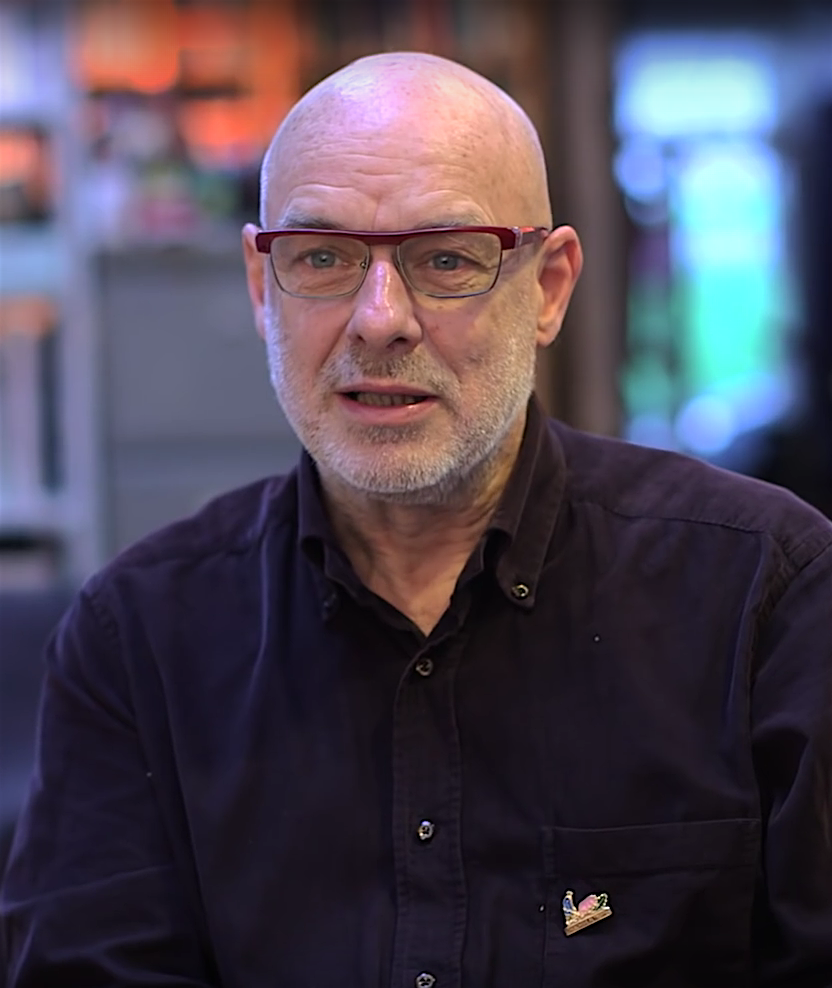
Brian Eno, The Unforgettables honoree

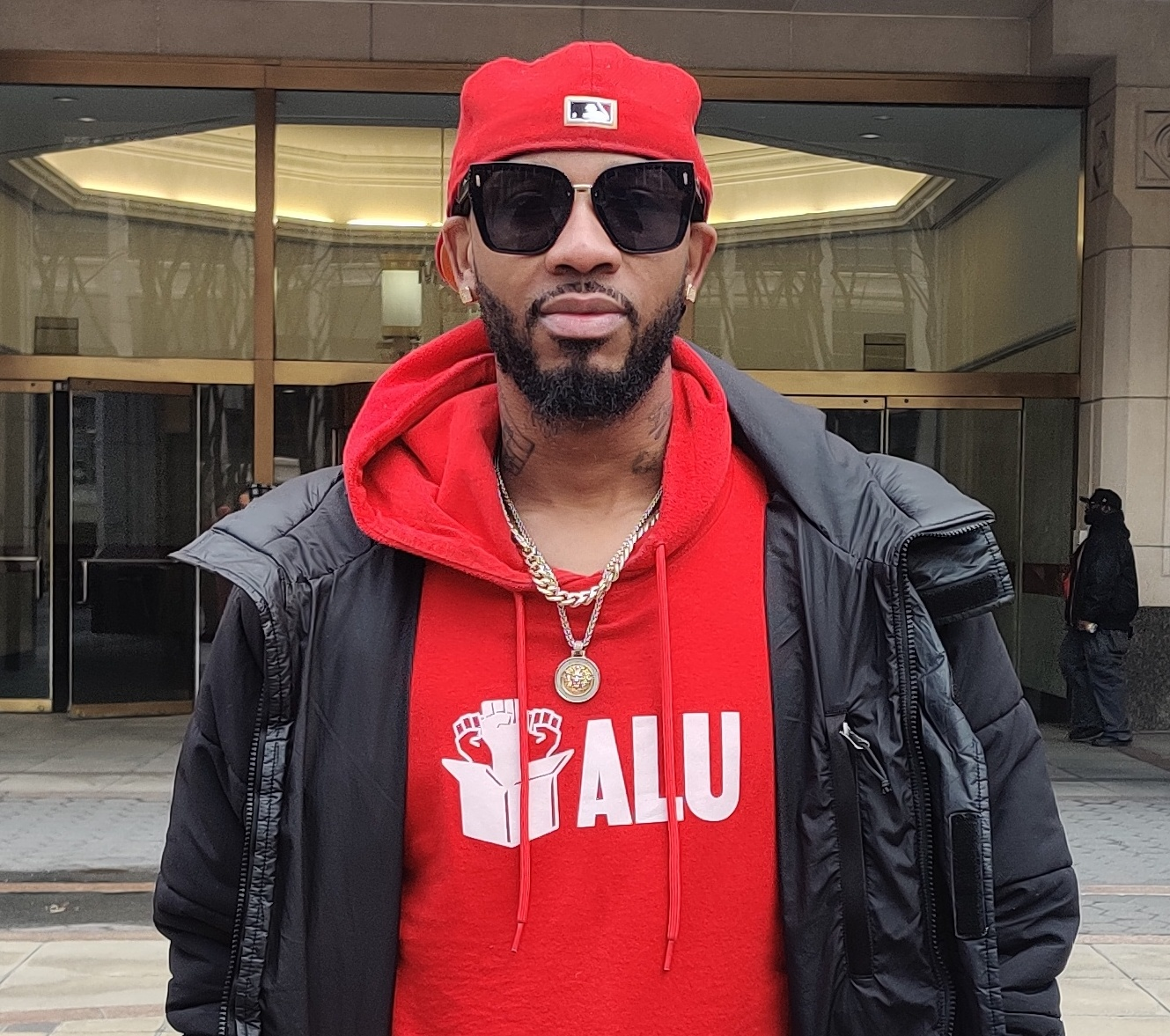
Chris Smalls, The Unforgettables honoree

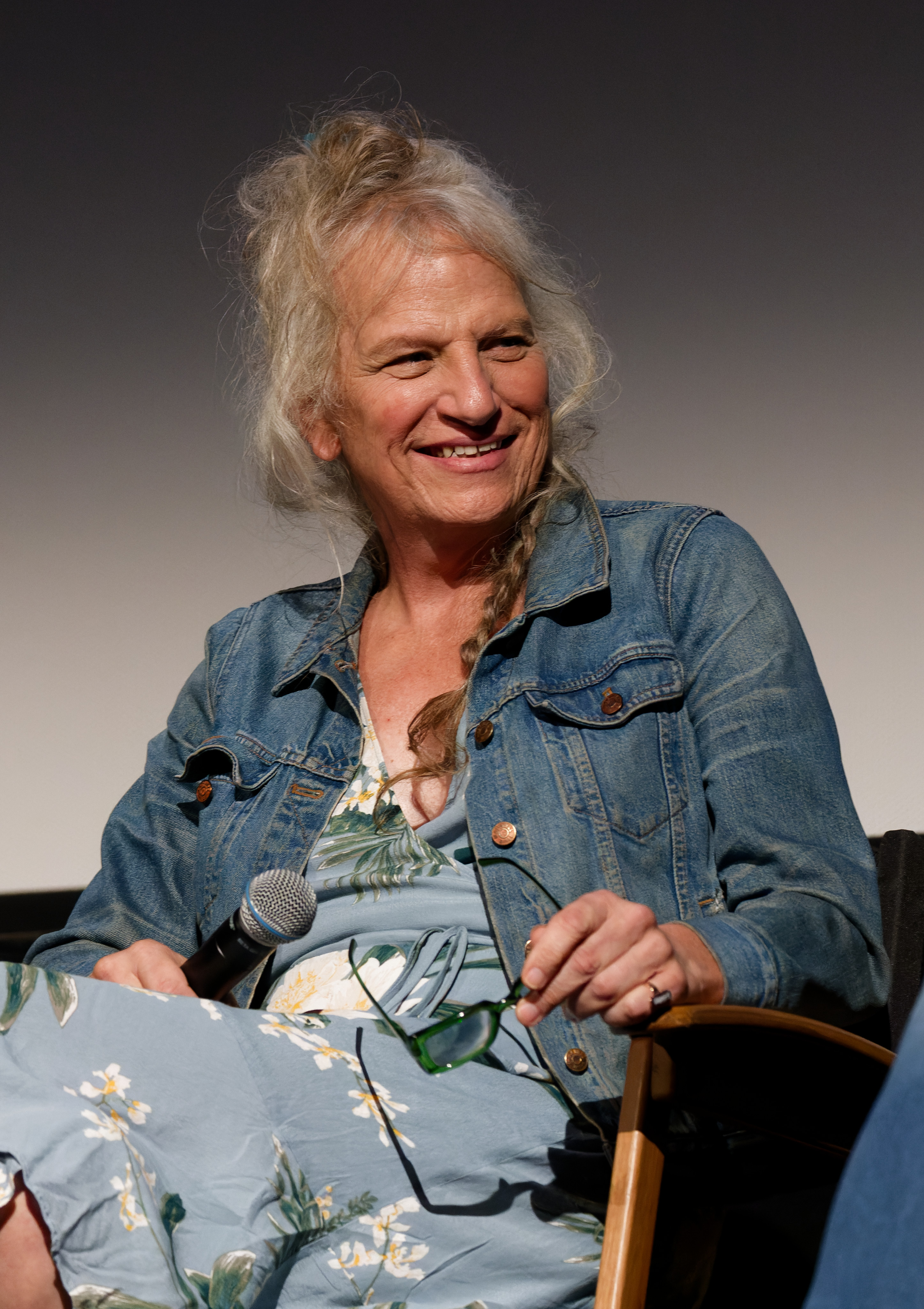
Harper Steele, The Unforgettables honoree

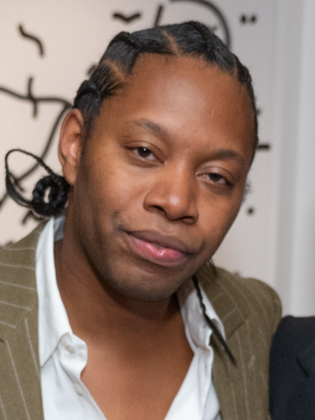
Jeremy O. Harris, Outstanding Broadcast Film winner

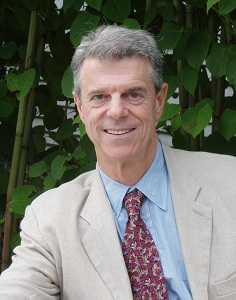
Peter Davis, Legacy Award recipient

The winners are listed first and in bold.

=== Feature film ===
Outstanding Non-Fiction Feature
**No Other Land – Yuval Abraham, Basel Adra, Hamdan Ballal, Rachel Szor, Fabien Greenberg, Bård Kjøge Rønning, Julius Pollux Rothlaender and Bård Harazi Farbuer**; Black Box Diaries – Shiori Itō, Eric Nyari, Hanna Aqvilin, Ema Ryan Yamazaki, Yuta Okamura, Yuichiro Otsuka, Mark Degli Antoni and Andrew Tracy; Dahomey – Mati Diop, Eve Robin, Judith Lou Levy, Gabriel Gonzalez, Joséphine Drouin Viallard and Nicolas Becker; Daughters – Natalie Rae, Angela Patton, Lisa Mazzotta, Justin Benoliel, James Cunningham, Mindy Goldberg, Sam Bisbee, Kathryn Everett, Laura Choi Raycroft, Adrian Aurelius, Philip Nicolai Flindt, Michael Cambio Fernandez and Kelsey Lu; Look Into My Eyes – Lana Wilson, Kyle Martin, Hannah Buck and Stephen Maing; Soundtrack to a Coup d'Etat – Johan Grimonprez, Daan Milius, Rémi Grellety, Jonathan Wannyn, Rik Chaubet, Ranko Pauković and Alek Bunic Goosse; Sugarcane – Julian Brave NoiseCat, Emily Kassie, Kellen Quinn, Christopher LaMarca, Nathan Punwar, Maya Daisy Hawke, Mali Obomsawin, Martin Czembor, Andrea Bella, Michael Feuser and Ed Archie Noisecat
Outstanding Direction	Outstanding Debut
**Dahomey – Mati Diop**; Eno – Gary Hustwit; Look Into My Eyes – Lana Wilson; Mistress Dispeller – Elizabeth Lo; No Other Land – Yuval Abraham, Basel Adra, Hamdan Ballal, and Rachel Szor; Sugarcane – Julian Brave NoiseCat and Emily Kassie; Union – Stephen Maing and Brett Story	**No Other Land – Directed by Yuval Abraham, Basel Adra, Hamdan Ballal, and Rachel Szor**; Black Box Diaries – Directed by Shiori Itō; Daughters – Directed by Natalie Rae and Angela Patton; Frida – Directed by Carla Gutiérrez; Grand Theft Hamlet – Directed by Pinny Grylls and Sam Crane; Hollywoodgate – Directed by Ibrahim Nash’at
Outstanding Production	Outstanding Editing
**Union – Mars Verrone and Samantha Curley**; Hollywoodgate – Shane Boris, Odessa Rae and Talal Derki; Mistress Dispeller – Elizabeth Lo, Emma D. Miller, and Maggie Li; No Other Land – Fabien Greenberg and Bård Kjøge Rønning; Porcelain War – Paula DuPre' Pesmen, Aniela Sidorska, Camilla Mazzaferro and Olivia Ahnemann; Sugarcane – Emily Kassie and Kellen Quinn	**Soundtrack to a Coup d'Etat – Rik Chaubetn**; Eno – Maya Tippet and Marley McDonald; Ernest Cole: Lost and Found – Alexandra Strauss; Frida – Carla Gutiérrez; Intercepted – Charlotte Tourres; Look Into My Eyes – Hannah Buck
Outstanding Cinematography	Outstanding Original Score
**Sugarcane – Emily Kassie and Christopher LaMarca**; Dahomey – Joséphine Drouin Viallard; Mistress Dispeller – Elizabeth Lo; Nocturnes – Satya Rai Nagpual; Porcelain War – Andrey Stefanov; Viktor – Olivier Sarbil	**The Remarkable Life of Ibelin – Uno Helmerssonm**; Dahomey – Wally Badarou and Dean Blunt; Ernest Cole: Lost and Found – Alexeï Aïgui; Frida – Victor Hernández Stumpfhauser; Nocturnes – Nainita Desai; Sugarcane – Mali Obomsawin
Outstanding Sound Design	Outstanding Visual Design
**Soundtrack to a Coup d'Etat – Ranko Pauković and Alek Bunic Goossed**; Dahomey – Nicolas Becker; Eno – Nas Parkash and Patrick Fripp; Intercepted – Alex Lane; Nocturnes – Tom Paul, Shreyank Nanjappa and Sukanto Mazumder; Viktor – Peter Albrechtsen, Nicolas Becker and Heikki Kossi	**Eno – Brendan Dawes**; Frida – Sofía Inés Cázares and Renata Galindo; Piece by Piece – Howard Baker; Porcelain War – Brendan Bellomo and BluBlu Studios; Queendom – Agniia Galdanova; The Remarkable Life of Ibelin – Rasmus Tukia and Ada Wikdahl
Outstanding Non-Fiction Short
**Incident – Directed by Bill Morrison (New Yorker)**; Contractions – Directed by Lynne Sachs (NY Times Op-Docs); Eternal Father – Directed by Ömer Sami (New Yorker); I Am Ready, Warden – Directed by Smriti Mundhra (MTV Documentary Films); Instruments of a Beating Heart – Directed by Ema Ryan Yamazaki (NY Times Op-Docs); Love in the Time of Migration – Directed by Erin Semine Kökdil and Chelsea Abbas (LA Times); Makayla's Voice: A Letter to the World – Directed by Julio Palacio (Netflix); The Medallion – Directed by Ruth Hunduma (New Yorker); A Move – Directed by Elahe Esmaili (NY Times Op-Docs); The Only Girl in the Orchestra – Directed by Molly O'Brien (Netflix); A Swim Lesson – Directed by Rashida Jones and Will McCormack (POV)
Spotlight Award	Heterodox Award
**Black Snow – Directed by Alina Simone**; Homegrown – Directed by Michael Premo; A New Kind of Wilderness – Directed by Silje Evensmo Jacobsen; A Photographic Memory – Directed by Rachel Elizabeth Seed; Two Strangers Trying Not to Kill Each Other – Directed by Jacob Perlmutter and Manon Ouimet	**Songs from the Hole – Directed by Contessa Gayles**; Caught by the Tides – Directed by Jia Zhang-ke; Kneecap – Directed by Rich Peppiatt; My First Film – Directed by Zia Anger; Pavements – Directed by Alex Ross Perry; Sing Sing – Directed by Greg Kwedar
Audience Choice Prize	The Unforgettables
**Porcelain War – Directed by Brendan Bellomo and Slava Leontyev**; Copa 71 – Directed by James Erskine and Rachel Ramsay; Daughters – Directed by Natalie Rae and Angela Patton; Frida – Directed by Carla Gutiérrez; Mountain Queen: The Summits of Lhakpa Sherpa – Directed by Lucy Walker; The Remarkable Life of Ibelin – Directed by Benjamin Ree; Skywalkers: A Love Story – Directed by Jeff Zimbalist; Sugarcane – Directed by Julian Brave NoiseCat, Emily Kassie; Super/Man: The Christopher Reeve Story – Directed by Ian Bonhôte and Peter Ettedgui; Will & Harper – Directed by Josh Greenbaum	**Black Box Diaries – Shiori Itō**; **Eno – Brian Eno**; **Mountain Queen: The Summits of Lhakpa Sherpa – Lhakpa Sherpa**; **No Other Land – Yuval Abraham and Basel Adra**; **Patrice: The Movie – Patrice Jetter**; **Queendom – Gena Marvin**; **Union – Chris Smalls**; **Will & Harper – Harper Steele**

=== Broadcast and Shorts ===
Outstanding Broadcast Film	Outstanding Nonfiction Series
**Slave Play. Not a Movie. A Play. – Directed by Jeremy O. Harris (HBO)**; Bread & Roses – Directed by Sahra Mani (Apple TV+); Girls State – Directed by Amanda McBaine and Jesse Moss (Apple TV+); Great Photo, Lovely Life: Facing a Family's Secrets – Directed by Amanda Mustard and Rachel Beth Anderson (HBO); The Lady Bird Diaries – Directed by Dawn Porter (Hulu); Spermworld – Directed by Lance Oppenheim (FX)	**Telemarketers – Directed by Adam Bhala Lough and Sam Lipman-Stern (HBO)**; America's Sweethearts: Dallas Cowboys Cheerleaders – Directed by Greg Whiteley and Chelsea Yarnell (Netflix); Deadlocked: How America Shaped the Supreme Court – Directed by Dawn Porter (Showtime); The Enfield Poltergeist – Directed by Jerry Rothwell (Apple TV+); The Luckiest Guy in the World – Directed by Steve James (ESPN); Ren Faire – Directed by Lance Oppenheim (HBO)
Outstanding Anthology Series
**How To with John Wilson – John Wilson, Nathan Fielder, Michael Koman and Clark Reinking, executive producers (HBO)**; Conan O'Brien Must Go – Conan O'Brien and Jeff Ross, executive producers (HBO); De La Calle – Nick Barili, Jared Andrukanis, Picky Talarico, Lydia Tenaglia, Christopher Collins, Amanda Culkowski, Bruce Gillmer and Craig H. Shepherd, executive producers (Paramount+); God Save Texas – Lawrence Wright, Alex Gibney, Richard Linklater, Peter Berg, Michael Lombardo, Elizabeth Rogers, Stacey Offman, Richard Perello, Nancy Abraham and Lisa Heller, executive producers (HBO); High on the Hog – Roger Ross Williams, Geoff Martz, Craig Piligian, Sarba Das, Fabienne Toback, Karis Jagger, Jessica B. Harris, Stephen Satterfield and Michele Barnwell, executive producers (Netflix); Photographer – Elizabeth Chai Vasarhelyi, Jimmy Chin, Pagan Harleman, Betsy Forhan, Anna Barnes and Chris Kugelman, executive producers (National Geographic)
Outstanding Broadcast Editing	Outstanding Broadcast Cinematography
**Girls State – Amy Foote (Apple TV+)**; The Greatest Night in Pop – Nic Zimmerman, Will Znidaric and David Brodie (Netflix); Ren Faire – Max Allman and Nicholas Nazmi (HBO); The Saint of Second Chances – Alan Lowe, Jeff Malmberg and Miles Wilkerson (Netflix); Telemarketers – Christopher Passig (HBO); Time Bomb Y2K – Marley McDonald and Maya Mumma (HBO)	**Ren Faire – Nate Hurtsellers (HBO)**; America's Sweethearts: Dallas Cowboys Cheerleaders – Jonathan Nicholas (Netflix); The Enfield Poltergeist – Ruben Woodin Deschamps, Carmen Pellon Brussosa and David Katznelson (Apple TV+); Girls State – Martina Radwan, Daniel Carter, Laela Kilbourn, Erynn Patrick Lamont, Laura Hudock, Thorsten Thielow (Apple TV+); Photographer – Michael Crommett, Rita Baghdadi, Peter Hutchens, Melissa Langer and Pauline Maroun (National Geographic); You Were My First Boyfriend – Brennan Vance and J. Bennett (HBO)

=== Legacy Award ===
- **Hearts and Minds – Directed by Peter Davis; Produced by Bert Schneider and Peter Davis; Cinematography by Richard Pearce; Editing by Lynzee Klingman and Susan Martin**
