= Primetime Emmy Award for Outstanding Directing for a Documentary/Nonfiction Program =

Television award category

- Awarded for: Outstanding Directing for a Documentary/Nonfiction Program
- Country: United States
- Presented by: Academy of Television Arts & Sciences
- Currently held by: Mariska Hargitay, My Mom Jayne: A Film by Mariska Hargitay (2026)
- Website: emmys.com

The Primetime Emmy Award for Outstanding Directing for a Documentary/Nonfiction Program is awarded to one program each year. The category was split in 2018 to separately recognize documentary/nonfiction and reality programs.

In the following list, the first titles listed in gold are the winners; those not in gold are nominees, which are listed in alphabetical order. The years given are those in which the ceremonies took place:

== Winners and nominations ==
=== 1970s ===
Year	Program	Episode	Nominee(s)	Network
1979	Outstanding Individual Achievement - Informational Programming (Note: As a juried award, nominees had to garner 50% approval to win the award.)			
1979	Who Are the DeBolts? And Where Did They Get Nineteen Kids?		John Korty	ABC

=== 1980s ===
Year	Program	Episode	Nominee(s)	Network
1983	Outstanding Individual Achievement - Informational Programming (Note: As a juried award, nominees had to garner 50% approval to win the award.)			
1983	The Body Human: The Living Code		Charles A. Bangert and Alfred R. Kelman	PBS
1984	Outstanding Individual Achievement - Informational Programming (Note: As a juried award, nominees had to garner 50% approval to win the award.)			
1984	He Makes Me Feel Like Dancin'		Emile Ardolino	PBS
1984	A Walk Through the 20th Century with Bill Moyers	"Marshall, Texas"	David Grubin	PBS
1986	Outstanding Individual Achievement - Informational Programming (Note: As a juried award, nominees had to garner 50% approval to win the award.)			
1986	The Spencer Tracy Legacy: A Tribute by Katharine Hepburn		David Heeley	PBS
1987	Outstanding Individual Achievement - Informational Programming - Directing (Note: As a juried award, nominees had to garner 50% approval to win the award. The nominees did not meet the benchmark and no award was given.)			
1987	American Masters	"Unknown Chaplin"	Kevin Brownlow and David Gill	PBS
1987	Minnelli on Minnelli: Liza Remembers Vincente		Richard Schickel	PBS
1989	Outstanding Directing in Informational Programming (Note: As a juried award, nominees had to garner 50% approval to win the award. The nominees did not meet the benchmark and no award was given.)			
1989	Destined to Live		Linda Otto	NBC
1989	Entertainment Tonight	"Lucille Ball Memorial"	Ron de Moraes	Syndicated

=== 1990s ===
Year	Program	Episode	Nominee(s)	Network
1990	Outstanding Individual Achievement - Informational Programming (Note: As a juried award, nominees had to garner 50% approval to win the award.)			
1990	American Masters	"W. Eugene Smith: Photography Made Difficult"	Gene Lasko	PBS
1990	The Wonderful Wizard of Oz: 50 Years of Magic		Jack Haley Jr.	CBS
1991	Outstanding Individual Achievement - Informational Programming (Note: As a juried award, nominees had to garner 50% approval to win the award.)			
1991	Soldiers of Music: Rostropovich Returns to Russia		Bob Eisenhardt, Susan Froemke, Peter Gelb and Albert Maysles	PBS
1991	The Astronomers	"Waves of the Future"	Linda Feferman	PBS
1991	Motel		Christian Blackwood	PBS
1991	The Power of the Past with Bill Moyers: Florence		David Grubin	PBS
1992	Outstanding Individual Achievement - Informational Programming (Note: As a juried award, nominees had to garner 50% approval to win the award.)			
1992	Hearts of Darkness: A Filmmaker's Apocalypse		Fax Bahr, George Hickenlooper and Eleanor Coppola	Showtime
1993	Outstanding Individual Achievement - Informational Programming (Note: As a juried award, nominees had to garner 50% approval to win the award.)			
1993	Earth and the American Dream		Bill Couturié	HBO
1993	Gridiron Gang		Lee Stanley	Syndicated
1993	Dancing	"Dance Centerstage"	Geoff Dunlop	PBS
1993	Dancing	"New Worlds, New Forms"	Orlando Bagwell	PBS
1993	Fallen Champ: The Untold Story of Mike Tyson		Barbara Kopple	NBC
1993	Healing and the Mind with Bill Moyers	"The Mystery of Chi"	David Grubin	PBS
1993	Lincoln		Peter Kunhardt	ABC
1994	Outstanding Individual Achievement - Informational Programming (Note: As a juried award, nominees had to garner 50% approval to win the award.)			
1994	Cats & Dogs	"Dogs Segment"	Robin Lehman	TBS
1994	I Am a Promise: The Children of Stanton Elementary School		Susan Raymond	HBO

=== 2000s ===
Year	Program	Episode	Nominee(s)	Network
2003	Outstanding Directing for Nonfiction Programming			
2003	American Experience	"The Murder of Emmett Till"	Stanley Nelson Jr.	PBS
2003	American Idol	"Finale"	Bruce Gowers	Fox
2003	Da Ali G Show	"Politics"	James Bobin	HBO
2003	Expedition: Bismarck		Andrew Wight and James Cameron	Discovery
2003	Journeys with George		Alexandra Pelosi and Aaron Lubarsky	HBO
2003	Unchained Memories: Readings from the Slave Narratives		Ed Bell and Thomas Lennon	HBO
2004
2004	Jockey		Kate Davis	HBO
2004	American Experience	"Tupperware!"	Laurie Kahn	PBS
2004	American Masters	"Judy Garland: By Myself"	Susan Lacy	PBS
2004	Born Rich		Jamie Johnson	HBO
2004	Queer Eye for the Straight Guy	"Richard Miller"	Becky Smith	Bravo
2005
2005	Death in Gaza		James Miller (posthumously)	HBO
2005	American Idol	"Finale"	Bruce Gowers	Fox
2005	The Apprentice	"Finale"	Glenn Weiss	NBC
2005	Extreme Makeover: Home Edition	"The Dore Family"	Patrick Higgins	ABC
2005	Unforgivable Blackness: The Rise and Fall of Jack Johnson		Ken Burns	PBS
2006
2006	Baghdad ER		Jon Alpert and Matthew O'Neill	HBO
2006	All Aboard! Rosie's Family Cruise		Shari Cookson	HBO
2006	American Masters	"John Ford/John Wayne: The Filmmaker and the Legend"	Samuel D. Pollard	PBS
2006	American Masters	"No Direction Home: Bob Dylan"	Martin Scorsese	PBS
2006	Children of Beslan		Ewa Ewart and Leslie Woodhead	HBO
2007	When the Levees Broke: A Requiem in Four Acts		Spike Lee	HBO
2007	Ghosts of Abu Ghraib		Rory Kennedy	HBO
2007	Star Wars: The Legacy Revealed		Kevin Burns	History
2007	Thin		Lauren Greenfield	HBO
2007	This American Life	"God's Close-Up"	Christopher Wilcha	Showtime
2008	This American Life	"Escape"	Adam Beckman and Christopher Wilcha	Showtime
2008	The Amazing Race	"Honestly, They Have Witch Powers or Something"	Bertram van Munster	CBS
2008	Autism: The Musical		Tricia Regan	HBO
2008	Project Runway	"En Garde!"	Tony Sacco	Bravo
2008	The War	"Pride of Our Nation (June–August 1944)"	Ken Burns and Lynn Novick	PBS
2009	Roman Polanski: Wanted and Desired		Marina Zenovich	HBO
2009	The Amazing Race	"Don't Let a Cheese Hit Me"	Bertram van Munster	CBS
2009	Project Runway	"Finale, Part 1"	Paul Starkman	Bravo
2009	This American Life	"John Smith"	Adam Beckman and Christopher Wilcha	Showtime
2009	Top Chef	"The Last Supper"	Steve Hryniewicz	Bravo

=== 2010s ===
Year	Program	Episode	Nominee(s)	Network
2010	American Experience	"My Lai"	Barak Goodman	PBS
2010	The Amazing Race	"I Think We're Fighting the Germans, Right?"	Bertram van Munster	CBS
2010	By the People: The Election of Barack Obama		Amy Rice and Alicia Sams	HBO
2010	Monty Python: Almost the Truth (Lawyers Cut)	"Lust for Glory"	Bill Jones and Ben Timlett	IFC
2010	Terror in Mumbai		Dan Reed	HBO
2011	Gasland		Josh Fox	HBO
2011	The Amazing Race	"You Don't Get Paid Unless You Win"	Bertram van Munster	CBS
2011	American Masters	"A Letter to Elia/Reflecting on Kazan"	Kent Jones and Martin Scorsese	PBS
2011	Becoming Chaz		Fenton Bailey and Randy Barbato	OWN
2011	Top Chef	"Give Me Your Huddled Masses"	Paul Starkman	Bravo
2012	George Harrison: Living in the Material World		Martin Scorsese	HBO
2012	The Amazing Race	"Let Them Drink Their Haterade"	Bertram van Munster	CBS
2012	American Masters	"Woody Allen: A Documentary"	Robert B. Weide	PBS
2012	Project Runway	"Finale, Part 2"	Craig Spirko	Lifetime
2012	Paradise Lost 3: Purgatory		Joe Berlinger and Bruce Sinofsky	HBO
2013	American Masters	"Mel Brooks: Make a Noise"	Robert Trachtenberg	PBS
2013	Ethel		Rory Kennedy	HBO
2013	Mea Maxima Culpa: Silence in the House of God		Alex Gibney	HBO
2013	Survivor	"Live Finale and Reunion (Caramoan: Fans vs. Favorites)"	Glenn Weiss	CBS
2013	Survivor	"Live Finale and Reunion (Philippines)"	Michael Simon	CBS
2014	The Square		Jehane Noujaim	Netflix
2014	The Amazing Race	"Part Like the Red Sea"	Bertram van Munster	CBS
2014	Cosmos: A Spacetime Odyssey	"Standing Up in the Milky Way"	Brannon Braga	Fox
2014	Project Runway	"Sky's the Limit"	Craig Spirko	Lifetime
2014	Shark Tank	"Episode 501"	Ken Fuchs	ABC
2015	Going Clear: Scientology and the Prison of Belief		Alex Gibney	HBO
2015	Citizenfour		Laura Poitras	HBO
2015	Foo Fighters: Sonic Highways	"Washington D.C."	Dave Grohl	HBO
2015	The Jinx: The Life and Deaths of Robert Durst	"Chapter 2: Poor Little Rich Boy"	Andrew Jarecki	HBO
2015	Kurt Cobain: Montage of Heck		Brett Morgen	HBO
2016	Making a Murderer	"Fighting for Their Lives"	Moira Demos and Laura Ricciardi	Netflix
2016	Cartel Land		Matthew Heineman	A&E
2016	Chef's Table	"Gaggan Anand"	David Gelb	Netflix
2016	He Named Me Malala		Davis Guggenheim	Nat Geo
2016	What Happened, Miss Simone?		Liz Garbus	Netflix
2017	O.J.: Made in America	"Part 3"	Ezra Edelman	ESPN
2017	Bright Lights: Starring Carrie Fisher and Debbie Reynolds		Alexis Bloom and Fisher Stevens	HBO
2017	Planet Earth II	"Cities"	Fredi Devas	BBC America
2017	Planet Earth II	"Islands"	Elizabeth White	BBC America
2017	13th		Ava DuVernay	Netflix
2018	Outstanding Directing for a Documentary/Nonfiction Program			
2018	Jane		Brett Morgen	Nat Geo
2018	Icarus		Bryan Fogel	Netflix
2018	The Vietnam War	"Episode 8: The History of the World (April 1969-May 1970)"	Ken Burns and Lynn Novick	PBS
2018	Wild Wild Country	"Part 3"	Chapman Way and Maclain Way	Netflix
2018	The Zen Diaries of Garry Shandling		Judd Apatow	HBO
2019
2019	Free Solo		Elizabeth Chai Vasarhelyi and Jimmy Chin	Nat Geo
2019	Fyre: The Greatest Party That Never Happened		Chris Smith	Netflix
2019	Leaving Neverland		Dan Reed	HBO
2019	RBG		Julie Cohen and Betsy West	CNN
2019	Three Identical Strangers		Tim Wardle	CNN

=== 2020s ===
Year	Program	Episode	Nominee(s)	Network
2020
2020	American Factory		Steven Bognar and Julia Reichert	Netflix
2020	Apollo 11		Todd Douglas Miller	CNN
2020	Becoming		Nadia Hallgren	Netflix
2020	The Cave		Feras Fayyad	Nat Geo
2020	The Last Dance	"Episode 7"	Jason Hehir	ESPN
2020	Tiger King: Murder, Mayhem and Madness	"Cult of Personality"	Eric Goode and Rebecca Chaiklin	Netflix
2021
2021	Dick Johnson Is Dead		Kirsten Johnson	Netflix
2021	Allen v. Farrow	"Episode 3"	Kirby Dick and Amy Ziering	HBO
2021	The Bee Gees: How Can You Mend a Broken Heart		Frank Marshall	HBO
2021	Boys State		Amanda McBaine and Jesse Moss	Apple TV+
2021	The Social Dilemma		Jeff Orlowski	Netflix
2021	Tina		Dan Lindsay and T. J. Martin	HBO
2022
2022	The Beatles: Get Back	"Part 3: Days 17-22"	Peter Jackson	Disney+
2022	The Andy Warhol Diaries	"Shadows: Andy & Jed"	Andrew Rossi	Netflix
2022	George Carlin's American Dream		Judd Apatow and Michael Bonfiglio	HBO Max
2022	Lucy and Desi		Amy Poehler	Prime Video
2022	Stanley Tucci: Searching for Italy	"Venice"	Ian Denyer	CNN
2022	We Need to Talk About Cosby	"Part 1"	W. Kamau Bell	Showtime
2023
2023	Still: A Michael J. Fox Movie		Davis Guggenheim	Apple TV+
2023	Judy Blume Forever		Davina Pardo and Leah Wolchok	Prime Video
2023	Moonage Daydream		Brett Morgen	HBO
2023	Pretty Baby: Brooke Shields		Lana Wilson	Hulu
2023	The Territory		Alex Pritz	Nat Geo
2023	The U.S. and the Holocaust	"Episode 3: The Homeless, Tempest-tossed (1942-)"	Ken Burns, Lynn Novick and Sarah Botstein	PBS
2024
2024	Girls State		Amanda McBaine and Jesse Moss	Apple TV+
2024	Albert Brooks: Defending My Life		Rob Reiner	HBO
2024	Beckham	"What Makes David Run"	Fisher Stevens	Netflix
2024	The Greatest Night in Pop		Bao Nguyen	Netflix
2024	Jim Henson Idea Man		Ron Howard	Disney+
2024	Steve! (Martin) A Documentary in 2 Pieces		Morgan Neville	Apple TV+
2025
2025	Pee-wee as Himself		Matt Wolf	HBO
2025	Deaf President Now!		Nyle DiMarco and Davis Guggenheim	Apple TV+
2025	Ladies & Gentlemen... 50 Years of SNL Music		Ahmir "Questlove" Thompson and Oz Rodríguez	NBC
2025	Super/Man: The Christopher Reeve Story		Ian Bonhôte and Peter Ettedgui	HBO
2025	Will & Harper		Josh Greenbaum	Netflix
2026
2026	My Mom Jayne: A Film by Mariska Hargitay		Mariska Hargitay	HBO
2026	Marty, Life Is Short		Lawrence Kasdan	Netflix
2026	Mel Brooks: The 99 Year Old Man!		Judd Apatow and Michael Bonfiglio	HBO Max
2026	Mr. Scorsese	"All This Filming Isn't Healthy"	Rebecca Miller	Apple TV
2026	Sean Combs: The Reckoning	"Pain vs Love"	Alexandria Stapleton	Netflix

== Individuals with multiple nominations ==
4 nominations

- Ken Burns

3 nominations

- Judd Apatow
- Davis Guggenheim
- Brett Morgen
- Lynn Novick
- Martin Scorsese
- Christopher Wilcha

2 nominations

- Adam Beckman
- Michael Bonfiglio
- Alex Gibney
- Rory Kennedy
- Amanda McBaine
- Jesse Moss
- Fisher Stevens
