= Girls State (film) =

2024 documentary film

- Release poster
- Directed by: Jesse Moss; Amanda McBaine
- Produced by: Jesse Moss; Amanda McBaine
- Cinematography: Daniel Carter; Laura Hudock; Laela Kilbourn; Keri Oberly; Erynn Patrick; Martina Radwan; Thorsten Thielow
- Edited by: Amy Foote
- Music by: T. Griffin
- Production companies: Apple Original Films; Concordia Studio; Mile End Films
- Distributed by: Apple TV+
- Release dates: January 18, 2024 (Sundance); April 5, 2024
- Running time: 96 minutes
- Country: United States
- Language: English

Girls State is a 2024 American documentary film, directed and produced by Jesse Moss and Amanda McBaine. It follows teenage girls from Missouri navigating a week-long immersive democratic experiment Girls State, learning how to build a government from the ground up. It serves as a companion film to Boys State (2020).

It had its world premiere at the 2024 Sundance Film Festival on January 18, 2024, and was released by Apple TV+ on April 5, 2024.

== Cast ==
The film primarily focuses on three participants in the program:

- Emily Worthmore, a Christian white conservative girl who runs for the Federalist Party Governor. She wants Girls State to be taken more seriously and increasingly focus on partisan issues rather than just bipartisan politics. Her passion for journalism leads to her interrogating the foundational differences between the Girls State and Boys State programs.
- Nisha Murali, an Indian American girl who pushes herself to be more social and loves big decision-making, aiming to be a Girls State Supreme Court Justice, going through a string of pressing interviews to do so. She is most vocal about the topic of abortion rights.
- Tochi Ihekona, a Black progressive girl who runs for the Nationalist Party State Attorney General. She is Nigerian with immigrant parents. She hopes to ensure she can provide quality legal counsel to the Supreme Court.

Other participants also make prominent appearances, especially Faith Glasgow and Cecilia Barton, who determinedly run for Federalist and Nationalist Party Governor respectively, as well as Brooke Taylor, who aims to be a Girls State Supreme Court Justice alongside Nisha, and Maddie Rowan, friend of Emily and vocal member of the queer community.

== Premise ==
A large group of teenage girls with diverse backgrounds and views from Missouri attend 2022's Girls State, a week-long democratic experiment about building a government from the ground up. Several girls campaign for the highest office at Girls State, Governor of Missouri. The film also tackles the systemic differences between Girls State and Boys State, the latter often being socially taken more seriously as a program for meaningful political discussions.

By the end, Cecilia Barton wins the election for Governor and Tochi Ihekona successfully becomes Attorney General at Girls State. And even though she lost the election for Governor, Emily Worthmore is granted a scholarship.

== Production ==
In December 2023, it was announced Jesse Moss and Amanda McBaine had directed a documentary film revolving around Girls State, with Apple TV+ producing and distributing.

== Release ==
It had its world premiere at the 2024 Sundance Film Festival on January 18, 2024. It was released on April 5, 2024.

== Reception ==
=== Critical response ===
On review aggregator Rotten Tomatoes, the film holds a 95% approval rating based on 60 reviews, with an average rating of 7.8/10. The website's critical consensus reads, "A look at what American democracy would look like in the hands of teenage girls. Young female leaders from wildly different backgrounds navigate an immersive experiment to build a government from the ground up." Metacritic, which uses a weighted average, assigned the film a score of 77 out of 100, based on 22 critics, indicating "generally favorable" reviews.

NPR included Girls State on its list of the best movies and TV of 2024, with critic Linda Holmes writing that the film "isn’t always easy to watch, but seeing how these girls think about leadership is fascinating."

=== Accolades ===
Award	Date	Category	Recipient	Result	Ref.
Primetime Creative Arts Emmy Awards	September 7, 2024	Outstanding Documentary or Nonfiction Special	Nicole Stott, Jonathan Silberberg, Davis Guggenheim, Laurene Powell Jobs, Amanda McBaine & Jesse Moss	Nominated	
Primetime Creative Arts Emmy Awards	September 7, 2024	Outstanding Cinematography for a Nonfiction Program	Laura Hudock, Laela Kilbourn, Daniel Carter, Erynn Patrick Lamont, Keri Oberly, Thorsten Thielow, and Martina Radwan	Won	
Primetime Creative Arts Emmy Awards	September 7, 2024	Outstanding Directing for a Documentary/Nonfiction Program	Amanda McBaine and Jesse Moss	Won	
Critics' Choice Documentary Awards	November 10, 2024	Best Political Documentary	Girls State	Nominated	
Cinema Eye Honors	January 9, 2024	Outstanding Broadcast Film	Amanda McBaine and Jesse Moss	Nominated	
Cinema Eye Honors	January 9, 2024	Outstanding Broadcast Editing	Amy Foote	Won	
Cinema Eye Honors	January 9, 2024	Outstanding Broadcast Cinematography	Martina Radwan, Daniel Carter, Laela Kilbourn, Erynn Patrick Lamont, Laura Hudock, Thorsten Thielow	Nominated	
