= Boys State (film) =

2020 documentary film directed by Jesse Moss and Amanda McBaine

- Theatrical release poster
- Directed by: Jesse Moss; Amanda McBaine
- Produced by: Amanda McBaine; Jesse Moss
- Cinematography: Thorsten Thielow
- Edited by: Jeff Seymann Gilbert
- Music by: T. Griffin
- Production companies: Concordia Studio; Mile End Films
- Distributed by: A24; Apple TV+
- Release dates: January 24, 2020 (Sundance); August 14, 2020 (United States)
- Running time: 109 minutes
- Country: United States
- Language: English

Boys State is a 2020 American documentary film directed and produced by Jesse Moss and Amanda McBaine. It follows a thousand teenage boys attending Boys State in Texas, coming to build a representative government from the ground up.

The film had its world premiere at the Sundance Film Festival on January 24, 2020, where it won the U.S. Documentary Competition Grand Jury Prize. It was released on Apple TV+ on August 14, 2020, by A24 and Apple.

In 2024, Jesse Moss and Amanda McBaine released the companion film Girls State, which follows the 2022 Girls State Program in Missouri.

== Cast ==
The film focuses on four participants in the program:

- Ben Feinstein, a crafty white boy from San Antonio and bilateral amputee with conservative views who runs for Federalist Party State Chairman
- Robert MacDougall, a jockish, jocular white boy from Austin with right-wing views who runs for Nationalist Party Governor
- Steven Garza, a soft-spoken Hispanic boy from a working-class family with progressive views who runs for Nationalist Party Governor
- René Otero, a highly charismatic black boy from Chicago with progressive views who runs for Nationalist Party State Chairman
- Eddy Proietti Conti, a sharp, congenial, and well-read boy who is elected Governor.

== Synopsis ==
The film follows a thousand teenage boys attending Boys State in Austin, Texas, coming together to build a representative government from the ground up, from all different political backgrounds, navigating challenges of organizing political parties, consensus, and campaigning for the highest office at Boys State, Governor of Texas.

The boys arrive for the program, where they are randomly divided into two parties, the Nationalists and Federalists. Those wishing to run for governor seek to collect 30 signatures to get on the primary ballot. In the Nationalist party: MacDougall does so easily; Garza manages to reach the threshold just before the deadline. Otero delivers a powerful speech and is elected state chairman for the Nationalists; he is subject to an impeachment motion that easily fails. In the Federalist party, Feinstein, who had planned on running for governor decides not to after meeting Proietti Conti (they are in the same "city" or dormitory) and is elected state chairman for the Federalists. In the Nationalist primaries, Garza delivers a sincere speech, but questions arise among conservative voters about his past participation in March for Our Lives, as well as his views on abortion and immigration policies. MacDougall positions himself as a conservative, hiding his true beliefs, but he comes across as less passionate and loses the race to Garza.

Meanwhile, the Federalists have elected Proietti Conti as their gubernatorial candidate. In the general election, the Federalists launch a meme page, starting a trend of political attack pages and digital meme warfare. However, the party dissociates itself from making any more meme pages after someone created a page that made a racist attack on Otero. Garza seems to be a promising candidate, but when Proietti Conti tries to conduct a Q&A during a speaking event Otero disallows it on the grounds that it had not been specifically requested prior. Feinstein uses that to accuses Otero of bias in the next forum. The boys cast their votes, and Proietti Conti is elected governor.

== Release ==
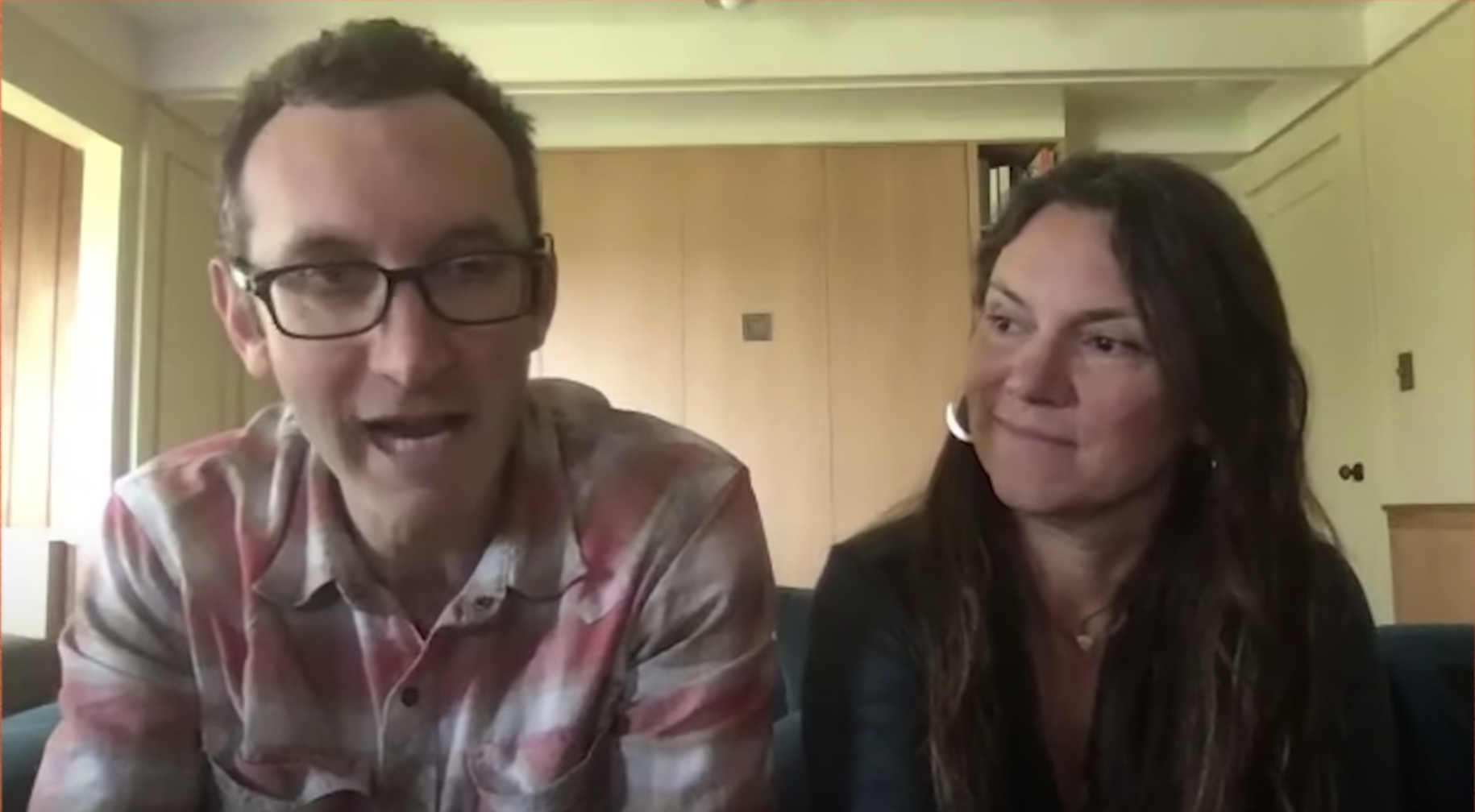
Boys State directors and producers Jesse Moss (left) and Amanda McBaine (right) interviewed by ReasonTV about the film

The film had its world premiere at the Sundance Film Festival on January 24, 2020. Shortly after, A24 and Apple acquired distribution rights to the film for $12 million. The film was set to screen at South by Southwest on March 13, 2020, but the festival was cancelled due to the COVID-19 pandemic. It was released on Apple TV+ on August 14, 2020, after its UK release at Sundance London 2020 Online on August 9.

== Reception ==
=== Critical response ===
On review aggregator Rotten Tomatoes, the film holds an approval rating of 94% based on 144 reviews, with an average rating of 8.2/10. The website's critics consensus reads: "Startling, upsetting, and overall absorbing, Boys State strikingly depicts American political divisions -- and machinations -- taking root in the next generation." On Metacritic, the film has a weighted average score of 84 out of 100, based on 32 critics, indicating "universal acclaim".

=== Accolades ===
At the 2020 Sundance Film Festival, the film won the U.S. Documentary Competition Grand Jury Prize. At South by Southwest, the film won the Louis Black Lone Star Award Special Jury Recognition for Documentary.

Year	Award	Category	Nominee(s)	Result	Ref.
2020	Critics' Choice Documentary Awards	Most Compelling Living Subject of a Documentary	Steven Garza	Won	
2020	Critics' Choice Documentary Awards	Best Political Documentary	Boys State	Won	
2020	Houston Film Critics Society Awards	Best Documentary Feature	Boys State	Nominated	
2020	Houston Film Critics Society Awards	Texas Independent Film Award	Boys State	Nominated	
2020	Online Film Critics Society Awards	Best Documentary	Boys State	Nominated	
2020	Sundance Film Festival	US Grand Jury Prize – Documentary	Boys State	Won	
2020	South by Southwest	Special Jury Recognition – Documentary	Boys State	Won	
2021	Austin Film Critics Association Awards	Best Documentary	Boys State	Won	
2021	Cinema Eye Honors	Audience Choice	Boys State	Won	
2021	Cinema Eye Honors	Outstanding Achievement in Nonfiction Feature Filmmaking	Amanda McBaine and Jesse Moss	Nominated	
2021	Cinema Eye Honors	Outstanding Achievement in Editing	Jeff Seymann Gilbert	Nominated	
2021	Cinema Eye Honors	The Unforgettables	Steven Garza	Won	
2021	Cinema Eye Honors	The Unforgettables	Rene Otero	Won	
2021	Directors Guild of America Awards	Outstanding Directorial Achievement in Documentary	Amanda McBaine and Jesse Moss	Nominated	
2021	Hollywood Critics Association	Best Documentary	Boys State	Nominated	
2021	National Board of Review	Top Five Documentaries	Boys State	Won	
2021	Primetime Creative Arts Emmy Awards	Outstanding Documentary or Nonfiction Special	Davis Guggenheim, Laurene Powell Jobs, Jonathan Silberberg, Nicole Stott, Shannon Dill, Amanda McBaine and Jesse Moss	Won	
2021	Primetime Creative Arts Emmy Awards	Outstanding Directing for a Documentary/Nonfiction Program	Amanda McBaine and Jesse Moss	Nominated	
