= Hello, Privilege. It's Me, Chelsea =

2019 documentary film

Hello Privilege. It's Me, Chelsea
- Film poster
- Directed by: Alex Stapleton
- Starring: Chelsea Handler
- Production company: Condé Nast Entertainment
- Distributed by: Netflix
- Release date: September 13, 2019
- Running time: 64 minutes
- Country: United States
- Language: English

Hello, Privilege. It's Me, Chelsea is a 2019 documentary directed by Alex Stapleton and starring Chelsea Handler. The premise revolves around examining the concept of white privilege. The film was released on September 13, 2019 on Netflix.

== Cast ==
- Chelsea Handler
- Kevin Hart
- Tiffany Haddish
- W. Kamau Bell
- Tim Wise
- Ruby Sales
- Rashad Robinson
- Carol Anderson
