= Caught by the Tides =

2024 film by Jia Zhangke

- Theatrical release poster

Chinese name
- Simplified Chinese: 风流一代
Transcriptions
Standard Mandarin
- Hanyu Pinyin: Fēngliú yīdài
- Directed by: Jia Zhangke
- Written by: Jia Zhangke; Wan Jiahuan
- Produced by: Casper Liang Jiayan; Shôzô Ichiyama
- Starring: Zhao Tao
- Cinematography: Yu Lik-wai; Éric Gautier
- Edited by: Yang Chao; Xudong Lin; Matthieu Laclau
- Music by: Lim Giong
- Production companies: Xstream Pictures; Momo Pictures; MK2 Films; Huanxi Media Group Limited; Wishart Media Co., Ltd.
- Release dates: 18 May 2024 (Cannes); 22 November 2024 (China)
- Running time: 111 minutes
- Country: China
- Language: Mandarin
- Box office: $1.7 million

Caught by the Tides (Chinese: 风流一代, lit. 'Romantic Generation') is a 2024 Chinese drama film directed by Jia Zhangke, and written by Wan Jianhuan and Jia Zhangke, based on footage across 22 years, some from Jia's previous films, in an impressionistic non-linear blend of fiction and non-fiction.

The film was selected to compete for the Palme d'Or at the 77th Cannes Film Festival, where it had its world premiere on 18 May 2024.

== Plot ==
In 2001, in the northern Chinese city of Datong, a working-class woman named Qiao Qiao has a romantic relationship with her manager Guao Bin as she hustles to make a living as a singer, model, and club girl. Bin leaves Datong to try to earn a living in another province, sending Qiao Qiao a text message that says he will bring her when he has money. After a stretch, Qiao Qiao decides to go looking for him, passing through communities that are being displaced by the Three Gorges Dam, as well as through Guangdong Province. Meanwhile, Bin tries his hand at a number of businesses, including entering a shady deal with a corrupt politician. When Qiao Qiao finally finds Bin, she breaks up with him. They eventually re-unite in COVID-era China, after both have noticeably aged.

== Cast ==
- Zhao Tao as Qiao Qiao
- Li Zhubin as Bin
- Pan Jianlin
- Lan Zhou
- Zhou You
- Xu Changchu

== Production ==
Jia first alluded to the film in a 2016 interview by stating, "During 1999 and 2000 was the time I had my first DV camera, so I would usually, aimlessly go about shooting footage. This is a habit I still maintain up to this day, and I have a lot of raw footage using different types of cameras and captures throughout the years. I might have a future plan of editing this footage and making it into a film."

The decision to use previous footage was sparked by the COVID-19 pandemic, which made filming in China difficult. As Jia was revisiting two decades of footage, some of which was shot as experimentation with different techniques rather than to capture specific scenes, he realized he could potentially re-use the footage as material for a new film.

Caught by the Tides is assembled from 22 years of footage, including many of Jia's previous characters and locations. As a result the actors naturally age, including the lead character, Qiao Qiao, who is played by Jia's real life wife, actress Zhao Tao. Part of the film takes place in Fengjie, the same setting as Jia's Golden Lion-winning film Still Life (2006), which also starred Zhao Tao.

Footage and outtakes from Unknown Pleasures, Still Life, and Ash Is Purest White were used in Caught by the Tides. Approximately 10 scenes from the film have appeared in Jia's previous films. Kodak Vision 2 and 3 film stock were used with Sony DSR-PD150, Sony Betacam, Sony HDV, Arricam LT 35mm, and Arri Alexa 35 cameras for the film. The final section, set in contemporary China, was shot during the pandemic. Editing was done using Final Cut Pro and DaVinci Resolve was used for colour correction.

== Release ==
Caught by the Tides was selected to compete for the Palme d'Or at the 2024 Cannes Film Festival, where it had its world premiere on 18 May 2024. The film played at the Toronto International Film Festival on 5 September 2024. It was also selected in Gala Presentation at the 29th Busan International Film Festival and screened on 5 October 2024.

The film was theatrically released in China on 22 November 2024.

For home video, the film is set to be released on Blu-ray and DVD by The Criterion Collection in 2026, as part of its Criterion Premieres line of discs.

== Reception ==
=== Critical response ===
On the review aggregator website Rotten Tomatoes, 98% of 64 critics' reviews are positive. The website's consensus reads: "An intimate epic that captures the passage of time with melancholic clarity, Caught by the Tides might be director Jia Zhangke and star Tao Zhao's most profound collaboration yet." Metacritic, which uses a weighted average, assigned the film a score of 87 out of 100, based on 24 critics, indicating "universal acclaim".

Simon Abrams of RogerEbert.com gave the film four out of four stars, writing, "At heart, Caught By the Tides is an experimental romantic drama, though that makes it sound unapproachable and a little gimmicky. It's neither, thankfully, and that's largely thanks to Jia's typical focus on the material signs of time's relentless passage."

=== Accolades ===
Award	Date of ceremony	Category	Recipient(s)	Result	Ref.
Cannes Film Festival	25 May 2024	Palme d'Or	Jia Zhangke	Nominated	
Cinema Eye Honors	9 January 2024	Heterodox Award	Caught by the Tides	Nominated	

== Works cited ==
- Prakash, Inney (2025). "Following the Currents". Filmmaker. Vol. 33, no. 3. The Gotham Film & Media Institute.
