= Sean Combs: The Reckoning =

2025 documentary television series

- Promotional poster
- Genre: Documentary
- Directed by: Alexandria Stapleton
- Country of origin: United States
- Original language: English
- No. of episodes: 4

Production
- Executive producers: 50 Cent; Alexandria Stapleton; David Karabinas; Ariel Brozell; Brad Bernstein
- Cinematography: C.T. Robert
- Editors: Jeremy Siefer; Charles Divak; Evan Wise; Jack Gravina; Adam Goldstein; Jonathan Miller
- Running time: 55–67 minutes
- Production companies: G-Unit Films and Television Inc.; House of Nonfiction; Texas Crew Productions

Original release
- Network: Netflix
- Release: December 2, 2025

Sean Combs: The Reckoning is an American television documentary miniseries about the sexual misconduct allegations against rapper Sean "Diddy" Combs. Directed by Alexandria Stapleton and produced by Curtis "50 Cent" Jackson, the series was released on Netflix on December 2, 2025.

== Cast ==
In addition to archival footage of Combs, the series includes interviews with:

- Kalenna Harper
- Aubrey O'Day
- Erick Sermon
- Al B. Sure!
- Mark Curry
- Lil' Cease
- Greg Kading
- Roger Bonds
- Capricorn Clark
- Kirk Burrowes
- Tim "Dawg" Patterson
- Joi Dickerson-Neal
- Clayton Howard
- Rodney "Lil Rod" Jones
- William Lesane
- Roxanne Johnson
- Brooklyn Babs

== Episodes ==
No.	Title	Duration	Original release date
1	"Pain vs Love"	61 minutes	December 2, 2025
In the early 1990s, during the golden age of hip-hop, Sean Combs becomes an intern at Uptown Records. After appearing in a music video for Uptown, Joi Dickerson-Neal alleges that Combs drugged and raped her, filmed the encounter, and showed it at his parties. During this time, Combs is also held responsible for the City College stampede, which caused the deaths of nine people in 1991. After being fired by Uptown in 1993, Combs co-founds Bad Boy Records with Kirk Burrowes and signs the Notorious B.I.G. to the label.
2	"What Goes Down Must Come Up"	59 minutes	December 2, 2025
3	"Official Girl"	55 minutes	December 2, 2025
4	"Blink Again"	67 minutes	December 2, 2025

== Production ==
On December 7, 2023, executive producer Curtis "50 Cent" Jackson announced that he was developing a Sean Combs docuseries and that proceeds from the project would go to victims of the sexual misconduct allegations against Combs. Before hiring Alexandria Stapleton to direct the series, Jackson had been working on the project for five months, looking for people close to Combs who were willing to "speak and tell the truth". Cassie Ventura, Combs's former partner, was invited to participate in the series but declined. Jackson said that he spoke to Ventura and her husband, Alex Fine, "to understand how things transpired" with Combs.

Netflix announced production on the series on September 25, 2024, one week after Combs was arrested on charges of racketeering, sex trafficking, and transportation to engage in prostitution. Jackson and Stapleton said:

This is a story with significant human impact. It is a complex narrative spanning decades, not just the headlines or clips seen so far. We remain steadfast in our commitment to give a voice to the voiceless and to present authentic and nuanced perspectives. While the allegations are disturbing, we urge all to remember that Sean Combs' story is not the full story of hip-hop and its culture. We aim to ensure that individual actions do not overshadow the culture's broader contributions.

The series features clips of Combs in the days before his 2024 arrest, prompting questions about how Jackson and Netflix acquired the clips. Stapleton said, "we obtained the footage legally and have the necessary rights."

== Release ==
The series' trailer was released on December 1, 2025. The series was released on Netflix the next day.

== Reception ==
In the six days after its release, the series was viewed 21.8 million times, making it the second-most-viewed Netflix title during the week of December 1–8, 2025, after Volume 1 of the fifth season of Stranger Things.

=== Critical response ===
On the review aggregator website Rotten Tomatoes, 90% of 10 critics' reviews are positive. The website's consensus reads: "Meticulous and sober rather than sensational, Sean Combs: The Reckoning is a smoothly made and exhaustive chronicle whose mounting, well-evidenced allegations leave a deep impact." Metacritic, which uses a weighted average, assigned the series a score of 67 out of 100, based on 5 critics, indicating "generally favorable" reviews.

The Guardian's Stuart Heritage rated the series four stars out of five and wrote, "Thankfully, the existence of The Reckoning seems to suggest that the arch manipulator has finally been outmanoeuvred. Although there are certainly elements of this story that have not been told – Combs's infamous "freak-off" parties are presented as an afterthought, and none of their long line of celebrity attendees are mentioned – the series does what is most needed right now. If Combs is able to uncancel himself in the face of evidence this damning, it will be nothing less than a miracle."

=== Reaction from Combs ===
Prior to its release, a spokesperson for Combs denounced the series as a "shameful hit piece", alleging that it uses "stolen footage that was never authorized for release". Following its release, Combs's mother, Janice Combs, issued a statement criticizing the series, while a spokesperson for Combs said that his team was "pondering their legal options over the Netflix docuseries and the stolen footage." Combs reportedly watched the series on a smuggled tablet he had purchased while incarcerated.

=== Related litigation ===
In April 2026, Maurice "Mopreme" Shakur, acting as the administrator of his father Mutulu Shakur's estate, filed a wrongful death lawsuit in Los Angeles County Superior Court against Duane "Keffe D" Davis. Represented by the law firm Quinn Emanuel Urquhart & Sullivan, the Shakur family began the litigation after allegations detailed in Sean Combs: The Reckoning. The legal filing asserts that the documentary and 2023 grand jury testimony are evidence of a "broader, more complex conspiracy" involving Combs regarding the 1996 homicide of Tupac Shakur.

=== Accolades ===
Award	Category	Recipient(s)	Result	Ref.
AAFCA TV Honors	Best Documentary	Sean Combs: The Reckoning	Won	
ACE Eddie Awards	Best Edited Documentary Series	Evan Wise, Charles Divak, Jeremy Siefer, Jack Gravina, Benji Kast, Adam Goldstein, and Jonathan Miller (for "Official Girl")	Nominated	
Black Reel TV Awards	Outstanding Documentary	Sean Combs: The Reckoning	Nominated	
Critics' Choice Real TV Awards	Best Limited Series	Sean Combs: The Reckoning	Nominated	
Directors Guild of America Awards	Outstanding Directorial Achievement in Documentary Series / News	Alexandria Stapleton (for "Official Girl")	Nominated	
Gotham TV Awards	Breakthrough Nonfiction Series	Brad Bernstein, Ariel Brozell, Curtis "50 Cent" Jackson, David Karabinas, Stacy Scripter, and Alexandria Stapleton	Nominated	
Primetime Emmy Awards	Outstanding Documentary or Nonfiction Series	Curtis "50 Cent" Jackson, Alexandria Stapleton, Stacy Scripter, David Karabinas, Ariel Brozell, Brad Bernstein, Megan Goedewaagen, and Vanessa Sanchez	Nominated	
Primetime Emmy Awards	Outstanding Directing for a Documentary/Nonfiction Program	Alexandria Stapleton (for "Pain vs Love")	Nominated	
Primetime Emmy Awards	Outstanding Picture Editing for a Nonfiction Program	Charles Divak, Evan Wise, Jack Gravina, Benji Kast, Adam Goldstein, Jonathan Miller, and Jeremy Siefer (for "Blink Again")	Won	
