= Queendom (film) =

2023 LGBT+ documentary film

- Theatrical release poster
- Directed by: Agniia Galdanova
- Screenplay by: Agniia Galdanova; Igor Myakotin
- Produced by: Agniia Galdanova; Igor Myakotin
- Starring: Gena Marvin
- Cinematography: Ruslan Fedotov
- Edited by: Vlad Fishez
- Production company: Galdanova Film LLC
- Distributed by: Greenwich Entertainment; Submarine; Dogwoof
- Release dates: March 11, 2023 (South by Southwest); June 14, 2024 (United States)
- Running time: 98 minutes
- Countries: United States; France
- Language: Russian
- Box office: $12,656

Queendom is a 2023 documentary film, directed and co-written by Agniia Galdanova. It portrays the Russian performance artist Gena Marvin, who attracts the attention of the public and the government of her country with her provocative works, in which she transforms her own body into gigantic, menacing silhouettes.

Queendom premiered at South by Southwest on March 11, 2023, and was released on June 14, 2024 in United States by Greenwich Entertainment.

The film received a 2024 Peabody Award. It was shortlisted in Best Documentary Feature Film at the 97th Academy Awards on 17 December 2024, but was not nominated.

== Content ==
Gena Marvin, a queer artist hailing from a small Russian town, creates otherworldly costumes from junk and tape to protest the government in Moscow. At just 21, having grown up on the harsh streets of Magadan, a former Soviet gulag outpost, she stages radical public performances that blend art and activism. Through these often dark, strange, and evocative displays, Gena aims to challenge perceptions of beauty and queerness while highlighting the harassment faced by the LGBTQ+ community. These performances, deeply rooted in her subconscious, come at a significant personal cost.

She is known for her provocative works that always create a buzz. During a photo shoot with her friend, she dons a gigantic silhouette outfit. However, when she enters a grocery store in this attire, the employees ask her to leave, deeming it inappropriate and comparable to lingerie.

"I like the idea that people can feel different emotions from anger to fear or joy when looking at my art." Gena Marvin on the effect of her art on the people.

The documentary also explores her complex relationship with her grandparents, who appear to be loving toward Gena but are puzzled by her artistic and unconventional tendencies.

== Cast ==
- Gena Marvin

== Production ==
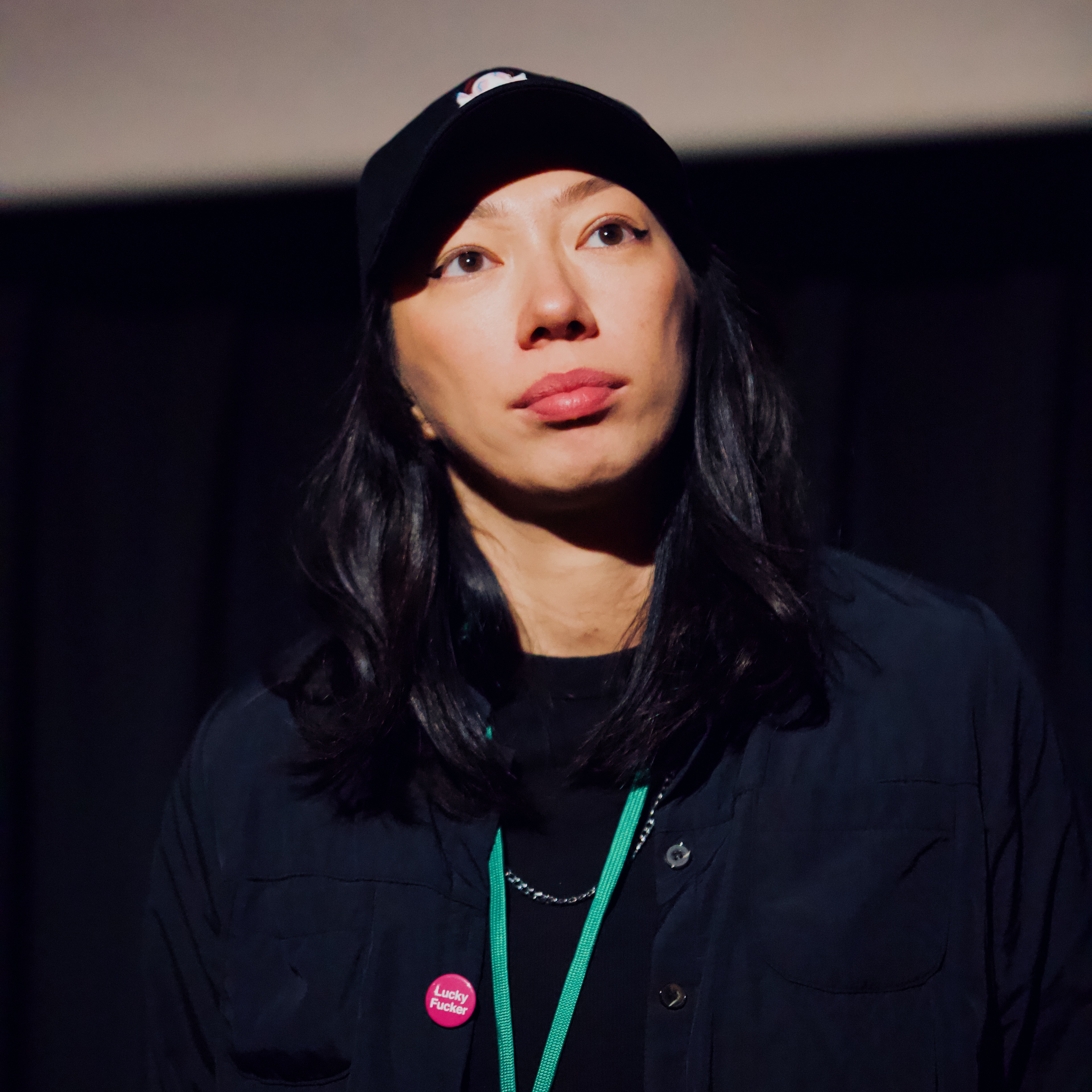
Director Agnija Galdanova

The film is directed by Agnija Galdanova, who met Gena Marvin in 2019 while researching for a planned documentary. At the time, she lived in St. Petersburg near the home of the director's mother. It was produced by Agniia Galdanova and Igor Myakotin, alongside executive producers Jess Search, David France, Arnaud Borges, and James Costa. It is a Galdanova Film production created in collaboration with the Sundance Institute Documentary Film Program, the International Documentary Association, InMaat Productions, Doc Society, and Sopka Films.

For the filming, Galdanova collaborated with cinematographer Ruslan Fedotov. They captured footage at a Navalny demonstration, in Moscow, in a suburb of St. Petersburg, and in Gena Marvin's hometown of Magadan. The film's producer, Igor Myakotin, is also from Magadan.

== Release ==
Queendom premiered on March 11, 2023, at the 2023 South by Southwest Film & TV Festival. Later in March, it was screened at CPH:DOX, the Copenhagen International Documentary Film Festival. The film was showcased at the Millennium Docs Against Gravity held from May 12 to 21, 2023, At the end of May 2023, it was screened at the Mammoth Lakes Film Festival, and then at the Toronto LGBT Film Festival (Inside Out) held from May 25 to June 4, 2023. It also made to the Sydney Film Festival held from June 7 to June 18, 2023. At the end of June 2023, it was also shown at the Munich Film Festival.

At the end of September, beginning of October 2023, it was shown at the Reykjavík International Film Festival. In October 2023, it competed at the Zurich Film Festival in the Documentary Competition and the 2023 BFI London Film Festival. In November 2023, the film was screened at the Tallinn Black Nights Film Festival.

In January 2024, Queendom was screened at the 35th Palm Springs International Film Festival in the Talking Pictures section. At the end of January, beginning of February 2024, it was shown at the Gothenburg Film Festival.

The film was released in United Kingdom cinemas on 1 December 2023, and was released on video-on-demand on the same day.

In April 2024, Greenwich Entertainment acquired North American distribution rights and released the film on June 14, 2024, in select United States theaters and video on demand platforms.

== Reception ==
=== Critical response ===
On the review aggregator Rotten Tomatoes website, the film has an approval rating of 100% based on 20 reviews, with an average rating of 8.2/10. On Metacritic, it has a weighted average score of 82 out of 100 based on 6 reviews, indicating "universal acclaim".

Wendy Ide reviewing for The Guardian rated the film with four stars out of five and wrote, "To call Gena a drag artist fails to capture just how subversive and courageous are her public 'performances'."

Manuel Betancourt, writing in Variety in his review Betancourt said: "Agniia Galdanova’s Oscar-shortlisted doc on a Russian drag artist and activist Gena Marvin is a heartbreaking portrait of strength and resilience." Betancourt concluded: "Queendom is both a powerful portrait of a queer artist as well as a sly call to arms."

Vladan Petkovic reviewing the film at CPH:DOX 2023 for Cineuropa wrote, "Agniia Galdanova's CPH:DOX prizewinner is an urgent, rich portrait of a Russian queer artist fighting prejudice and heavy-handed patriarchy."

Stephanie Archer reviewing for Film Inquiry at SXSW Film Festival 2023, wrote, "Queendom is a beautiful film of pain, emotion, expression, and resilience."

Monica Castillo reviewing for RogerEbert.com gave 3.5 out of 4 and wrote, "Galdanova and cinematographer Ruslan Fedotov give Gena marvelous closeups, highlighting the nuances of her performance, the articulate lines of makeup, and intricate costume designs for a dazzling effect."

=== Accolades ===
Award	Date	Category	Recipient	Result	Ref.
South by Southwest	19 March 2023	Documentary Feature Competition	Queendom	Nominated	
CPH:DOX	26 March 2023	Grand Jury Next:Wave Award	Agniia Galdanova	Won	
OUTshine Film Festival Miami	30 April 2023	Best Documentary Film	Agniia Galdanova	2nd Place	
Filmfest München	30 June 2023	CineRebels Award – Special Mention	Queendom	Won	
Camden International Film Festival	18 September 2023	Audience Award	Queendom	Won	
Zurich Film Festival	10 October 2023	Documentary Competition – Special Mention	Queendom	Won	
Zurich Film Festival	10 October 2023	Audience Award	Queendom	Won	
BFI London Film Festival	15 October 2023	Documentary Competition	Queendom	Nominated	
International Documentary Association Awards	5 December 2024	Best Feature Documentary	Queendom	Nominated	
International Documentary Association Awards	5 December 2024	Best Director	Agniia Galdanova	Nominated	
International Documentary Association Awards	5 December 2024	Best Cinematography	Ruslan Fedotov	Won	
Cinema Eye Honors	9 January 2025	Outstanding Visual Design	Agniia Galdanova	Nominated	
Cinema Eye Honors	9 January 2025	The Unforgettables	Gena Marvin	Won	
Peabody Awards	1 May 2025	Documentary	A Galdanova Film Production in association with Sundance Institute Documentary Film Program, International Documentary Association, InMaat Productions, Doc Society and Sopka Films	Won	

== See also ==
- Submissions for the Academy Award for Best Documentary Feature
