= Corman's World: Exploits of a Hollywood Rebel =

- Film poster
- Directed by: Alex Stapleton
- Written by: Alex Stapleton
- Produced by: Alex Stapleton
- Starring: Roger Corman; Jack Nicholson; Martin Scorsese
- Cinematography: Patrick Simpson
- Distributed by: Anchor Bay Films
- Release dates: January 21, 2011 (Sundance); March 27, 2012
- Running time: 95 minutes
- Country: United States
- Language: English

Corman's World: Exploits of a Hollywood Rebel is a 2011 documentary film directed by Alex Stapleton about the life and career of filmmaker Roger Corman.

== Interviewees ==
- Roger Corman
- Jack Nicholson
- Martin Scorsese
- Robert De Niro
- Paul W. S. Anderson
- Ron Howard
- William Shatner
- Quentin Tarantino
- Bruce Dern
- David Carradine
- Peter Bogdanovich
- Joe Dante
- Jonathan Demme
- Peter Fonda
- Pam Grier
- Eli Roth
- Penelope Spheeris

== Release ==
Corman's World: Exploits of a Hollywood Rebel premiered at the Sundance Film Festival.

It made its television debut on A&E.

It was released on DVD on March 27, 2012.

== Reception ==
Corman's World: Exploits of a Hollywood Rebel received mostly positive reviews from critics, with a score of 92% on Rotten Tomatoes.

Den of Geek awarded it a score of four out of five, saying "Most of all, Corman’s World paints a portrait of a filmmaker who, although not without flaw (his penny-pinching mode of operation didn’t always work in his favour), has earned a great deal of respect and fondness from those who’ve spent any time on set with him."

The Observer said "Instead of the subtitle "Exploits of a Hollywood Rebel", this film could as easily be called "The Rebellion of a Hollywood Exploiter" for the way it records the ingenuity, daring and innovation that went into his productions and drove him to create his own studio and distribution company", but was critical of the fact that several of Corman's more acclaimed films were overlooked.

The A.V. Club awarded it a score of B−, saying "Corman’s World establishes its subject as a fascinating contradiction, a madman with the calm, soothing, rational manner of the sanest man in the world. "

The New York Times called it an "affectionate and informative documentary", praising both Corman's appearance in the film and its approach it his work.

The London Evening Standard was more critical, calling it "A frustrating documentary about a frustrating man."

The Hollywood Reporter praised the documentary, saying "Funny, quick-paced and stuffed with well-known interviewees, it naturally has far better niche theatrical prospects than anything its subject has produced lately."

Dread Central awarded it a score of four and a half out of five, saying "It’s as inspiring as it is informative, and is a great tribute to a living legend."
