= Instruments of a Beating Heart =

2024 documentary short film by Ema Ryan Yamazaki

- Promotional poster
- Directed by: Ema Ryan Yamazaki
- Produced by: Eric Nyari
- Starring: Ayame
- Cinematography: Kazuki Kakurai
- Edited by: Mizuki Toriya
- Music by: Päivi Takala
- Production companies: Cineric Creative; NHK
- Distributed by: The New York Times Op-Docs
- Release date: June 14, 2024 (DC/DOX Fest)
- Running time: 23 minutes
- Country: Japan
- Language: Japanese

Instruments of a Beating Heart is a 2024 Japanese documentary short film directed by Ema Ryan Yamazaki. Edited down from Yamazaki's 2023 feature The Making of a Japanese, the film documents the challenge presented to the first graders in a Tokyo public elementary school of performing "Ode to Joy" at the ceremony for the new incoming first graders, as their assignment for the final semester.

Instruments of a Beating Heart had its world premiere on June 14, 2024, in the Shorts Program: One-of-a-Kind of DC/DOX Film Festival 2024. It won Best Short Documentary at the 40th IDA Documentary Awards and was nominated for Best Documentary Short Film at the 97th Academy Awards.

== Summary ==
The documentary follows Ayame, a soon to be second grade school girl eager to participate in a group performance of Beethoven's "Ode to Joy" to welcome new first graders. Encouraged by the teacher to think beyond herself, Ayame wins the cymbal role in the audition. However, a lack of dedication to her task leads to mistakes during rehearsals, prompting the teacher to emphasize the importance of harmony and diligence. Following a reprimand during practice, Ayame loses confidence. Classmates and teachers offer encouragement and support, leading her to rejoin the group and become a part of its eventual success.

== Cast ==
- Teachers and students of Tokyo public elementary school

== Release ==
It had its International Premiere on June 21, 2024, in the Shorts –3 of Doc Edge Film Festival 2024.

It had its Midwest premiere at the Indy Shorts Film Festival on 25 July 2024 in Music.

The film was made available for streaming on November 18, 2024 via YouTube and The New York Times Op-Docs.

The film was showcased at the Doc NYC on November 15, 2024, in the Shorts Human Spirit programme.

== Accolades ==
Award	Date of ceremony	Category	Recipient(s)	Result	Ref.
International Documentary Association Awards	5 December 2024	Best Short Documentary	Instruments of a Beating Heart	Won	
Cinema Eye Honors	January 9, 2025	Outstanding Non-Fiction Short	Instruments of a Beating Heart	Shortlisted	
Academy Awards	March 2, 2025	Best Documentary Short Film	Ema Ryan Yamazaki and Eric Nyari	Nominated	

== See also ==
- Beethoven's Symphony No. 9
- Submissions for Best Documentary Short Academy Award
