= Reggie (film) =

- Directed by: Alex Stapleton
- Produced by: Daniel Crown; Chris Leggett; Yoni Liebling; Rafael Marmor; Alex Stapleton
- Starring: Reggie Jackson
- Cinematography: Arlene Nelson
- Edited by: Billy McMillin
- Music by: Ryan Shields
- Production companies: Bron Life; Delirio Films; Red Crown Productions; Creative Wealth Media
- Distributed by: Amazon Studios
- Release date: March 24, 2023
- Country: United States
- Language: English

Reggie is a 2023 documentary film centered on American former professional baseball player Reggie Jackson, directed by Alex Stapleton. It was released on Prime Video on March 24, 2023.

== Summary ==
The film tells the story of the life and career of Reggie Jackson, a Major League Baseball Hall of Fame player, five-time World Series champion, and large personality in the 1970s and 1980s, and examines his legacy as a trailblazing Black athlete. In the film, Jackson sits down with fellow athletes to discuss their legacies, and their experiences at the intersection of race and sports. Featured athletes include Derek Jeter, Bill Russell, Julius Erving, Hank Aaron, and Pete Rose.

== Cast ==
- Reggie Jackson
- Derek Jeter
- Bill Russell
- Julius Erving
- Hank Aaron
- Pete Rose
- Franco Harris
- Aaron Judge
- Vida Blue
- Rollie Fingers
- Rick Hendrick
- Jose Altuve
- Dave Stewart
- Hal Steinbrenner

== Production ==
The idea for the documentary was conceived in 2019, and filming began in June 2020. On May 4, 2022, it was announced that Reggie Jackson would be the subject of a documentary from Bron Life, Delirio Films, and Red Crown Productions, to be directed by Alex Stapleton. The film is produced by Daniel Crown, Chris Leggett, Yoni Liebling, Rafael Marmor, and Stapleton, and executive produced by Brenda Gilbert, Aaron L. Gilbert, Josh Miller, Kim Carsten, Zoë Morrison, Jason Cloth, and Suraj Maraboyina.

== Release ==
The film was released on Prime Video on March 24, 2023.
