= Eno (2024 film) =

2024 documentary film

- Directed by: Gary Hustwit
- Produced by: Gary Hustwit; Jessica Edwards
- Cinematography: Mary Farbrother
- Edited by: Marley Mcdonald; Maya Tippett
- Production companies: Film First Co.; Tigerlily Productions
- Release date: January 18, 2024 (Sundance)
- Running time: 100 minutes
- Countries: United States; United Kingdom
- Language: English
- Box office: $646,235

Eno is a 2024 documentary film about the English musician and producer Brian Eno, produced and directed by Gary Hustwit. It premiered at the Sundance Film Festival on January 18, 2024.

== Production ==
The film uses a computer program (pseudorandom number generator) to select footage (Segments) and present the film so that a different version is shown each time it is screened. The film draws from 30 hours of interviews with Brian Eno and 500 hours of footage from Eno’s archive.

Alongside Hustwit, artist Brendan Dawes designed the Brain One software (an anagram of Brian Eno), the generative technology which powers the film. For live screenings of the film, Swedish technology company Teenage Engineering designed B-1, a hardware version of the generative software. In July 2024, The New York Times estimated that 52 quintillion versions of the film could be generated by Brain One.

== Release ==
As of 2026, Eno is currently available to stream on The Criterion Channel, with a new version of the film being featured each month.

== Reception ==
On the review aggregator website Rotten Tomatoes, 96% of 28 critics' reviews are positive, with an average rating of 8.4/10. Metacritic, which uses a weighted average, assigned the film a score of 74 out of 100, based on 12 critics, indicating "generally favorable" reviews. Owen Gleiberman of Variety wrote that "the film conjures a wholehearted and accessible experience within an experimental veneer." David Fear of Rolling Stone described it as "a singular experience, impossible to replicate and uninterested in being definitive on anything, much like the gent at the center of it all."
