= Ema Ryan Yamazaki =

Japanese-British documentary filmmaker

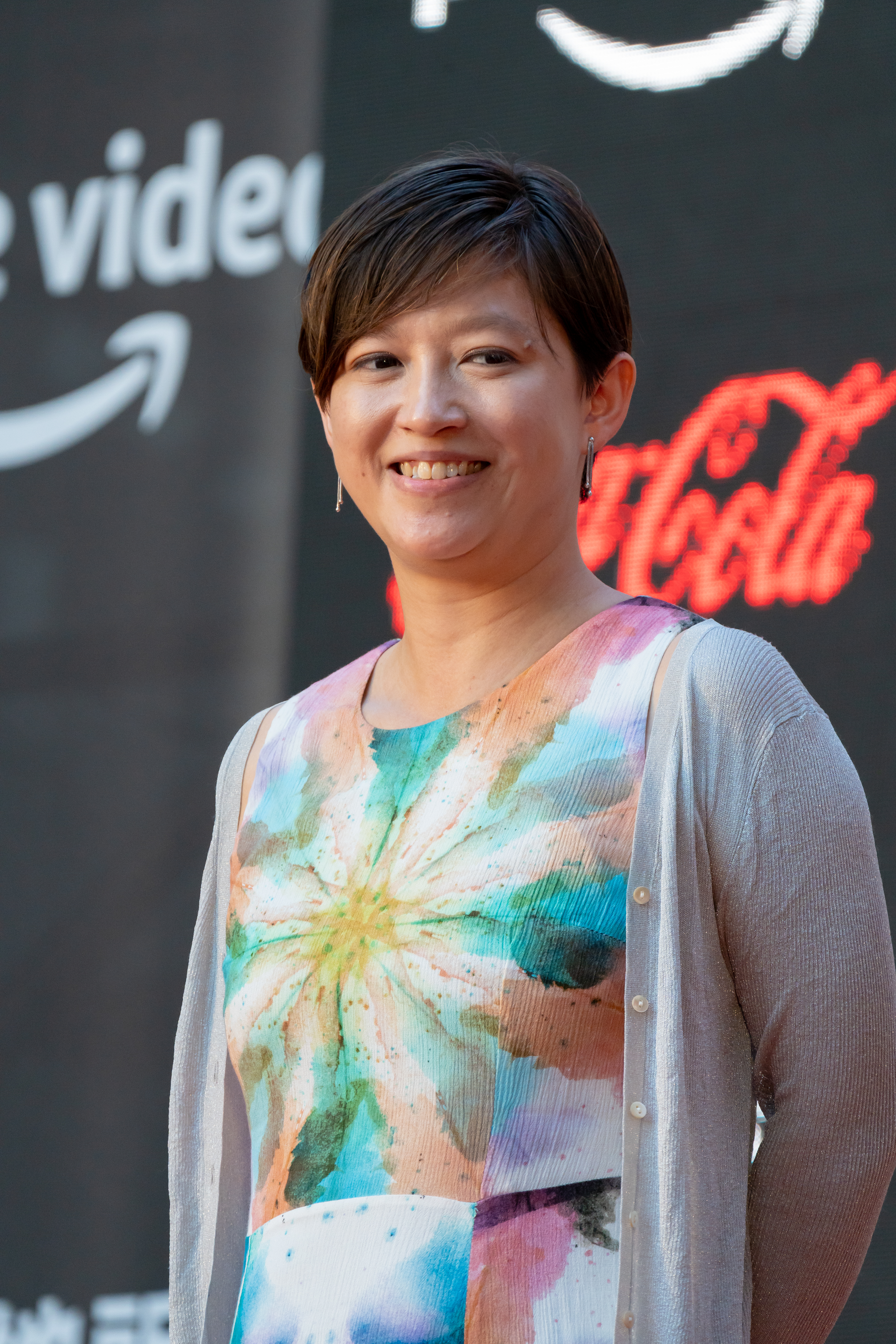
- Tokyo International Film Festival in 2023
- Born: 1989 (age 36–37); Kobe, Japan
- Occupation: Documentary filmmaker
- Years active: 2017-present
- Spouse: Eric Nyari

Ema Ryan Yamazaki (山崎エマ, Yamazaki Ema; born 1989) is a Japanese-born British documentary filmmaker and editor.

== Early years ==
Yamazaki was born in Kobe, Japan to a British college professor father and a Japanese schoolteacher mother. She grew up near Osaka, and spent summers in England. Yamazaki graduated from Canadian Academy in Kobe in 2008. Following high school, she moved to New York, graduating from New York University with a focus on documentary filmmaking and editing.

After graduation, Yamazaki served as an assistant for documentary filmmaker Sam Pollard, working as a film editor.

== Career ==
Yamazaki first feature-length documentary was her 2017 Monkey Business: The Adventures of Curious George's Creators, which chronicles the lives of Curious George authors Hans and Margret Rey. It won the audience award for Best Documentary Feature at the Nantucket Film Festival.

Her next film, Koshien: Japan's Field of Dreams followed coaches and players from two Japanese high schools during the 100th summer Kōshien baseball tournament, and was shown on ESPN. Following additional documentary work with Japan's NHK, Yamazaki won the 2020 Documentary Filmmaker of the Year Award from Yahoo Japan.

In 2023, Yamazaki completed work on The Making of a Japanese (released in Japan under the different name 小学校～それは小さな社会～). The work closely follows first and sixth graders for one year at a public elementary school in Tokyo's Setagaya ward, giving an intimate look at how the Japanese educational system shapes the lives of those who pass through it. Her shorter film, Instruments of a Beating Heart was adapted from The Making of a Japanese and released by the New York Times. It won the award for Best Short Documentary at the International Documentary Association's 2024 awards ceremony and was nominated for a 2025 Best Documentary Short Film at the 97th Academy Awards.

== Personal life ==
Yamazaki married film producer Eric Nyari in 2017. They have collaborated on several films.

== Filmography ==
=== Film ===
| Year | Title | Role | Notes |
|---|---|---|---|
| 2017 | Monkey Business: The Adventures of Curious George's Creators | Director | |
| 2019 | Koshien: Japan's Field of Dreams | Director | |
| 2023 | The Making of a Japanese | Director | |
| 2024 | Black Box Diaries | Editor | |
| 2024 | Instruments of a Beating Heart | Director | |
