= Gena Marvin =

Russian performance artist

- Born: 1999/2000 (age 26–27); Magadan, Russia
- Occupation: Performance artist

Gena Marvin (born 1999 or 2000) is a Russian performance artist known for their surreal and creature drag. Their art focuses on themes of identity, self-acceptance, different forms of beauty, and the surreal.

Marvin is the star of the Peabody Award winning documentary Queendom (2023).

== Early life and education ==
Gena Marvin was born in Magadan, Russia. She grew up practicing drag makeup in secret in her parents' house. She said she was bullied and tormented growing up in her small village. This, alongside the tale of Slender Man, would become a major inspiration for her artwork. She attended two colleges, and said she experienced homophobia at both. She was expelled from the second college a year before graduating.

== Art ==
Marvin's art primarily consists of creature drag, and she often wears latex, gloves with exaggerated fingers, platform heels, and white face paint. Much of her performance art incorporates the reactions of others to her appearance.

Although she performed in public in Russia, she has spoken of the danger she faces in doing so, and has said she feels safer posting her artwork on social media platforms including Instagram and TikTok. One of her performances involved wrapping her body in tape, expressing her belief that Russia had "no freedom and where the freedom of my body was not permitted".

Marvin is the subject of Queendom, a documentary directed by Agniia Galdanova and produced by David France and Igor Myakotin. It follows Marvin from 2019 until February 2023, and shows Marvin performing her art while facing the risk of imprisonment or death in Russia where LGBTQ people face legal and extralegal risk. The film premiered at South by Southwest, and won the Next:Wave award at Copenhagen's CPH:DOX and The Audience Award at the Camden International Film Festival. The film premiered in cinemas in the United Kingdom on 1 December 2023.

== Personal life ==
Marvin lived in St. Petersburg beginning in around 2019. After an April 2021 performance at a protest supporting Russian opposition leader Alexei Navalny, she said she moved to Moscow "to push even harder". In 2022, Marvin became a refugee from the Russian invasion of Ukraine and moved to Paris.

Marvin is non-binary and queer.
