= Alex Stapleton =

American filmmaker

- Born: Kristin Alexandria Stapleton; United States
- Occupations: Film director, producer, showrunner
- Employer: House of NonFiction

Kristin Alexandria Stapleton is an American director, producer, and showrunner who specializes in documentary feature films and unscripted television.

== Career ==
Stapleton's directorial debut was the 2011 feature documentary, Corman's World: Exploits of a Hollywood Rebel, about the life and career of film producer Roger Corman. Premiering at the 2011 Cannes Film Festival, it was in competition for the Caméra d'Or award. The documentary includes interviews with Jack Nicholson, Martin Scorsese, and Ron Howard among others. On review aggregator Rotten Tomatoes, Corman's World: Exploits of a Hollywood Rebel has an approval rating of 92% based on 51 reviews.

In 2019, Stapleton directed and executive produced the Netflix documentary Hello, Privilege. It's Me, Chelsea. The project follows Chelsea Handler as she reexamines the concept of white privilege and its effect on American culture. For the 2020 Netflix docuseries, The Playbook, Stapleton directed an episode on coach Jill Ellis about the rules she lives by to find success on and off the field.

Stapleton executive produced and showran the FX documentary television miniseries Pride, which followed the fight for LGBT rights in the United States decade-by-decade from the 1950s to the 2000s. Produced by Killer Television, Vice Studios, and Refinery29, the 6 episode series premiered on May 14, 2021. On Rotten Tomatoes, Pride has an approval rating of 100% based on 12 reviews, with an average rating of 7.5/10. The series was nominated for several awards, including a Gotham Independent Film Award and a GLAAD Media Award.

Later in 2021, Stapleton founded the production company House of NonFiction, which has an overall deal with Industrial Media. House of NonFiction's overall continued with Sony Pictures Television following the later's acquisition of Industrial Media in 2022. Stapleton directed the 2023 Reggie Jackson documentary Reggie with Delirio Films, BRON, and Red Crown Productions producing.

In 2024, Stapleton directed an episode of God Save Texas for HBO, focusing on the energy industry and its impact on her family in Houston, Texas. She also directed and executive-produced the two-part documentary series, How Music Got Free, for Paramount+, which followed the dramatic changes to the music industry in the late '90s and early 2000s that resulted from file-sharing technology and the rapid growth of music piracy. In 2025, Stapleton was hired by rapper Curtis "50 Cent" Jackson to direct a documentary about the Sean Combs sexual misconduct allegations. The four-part series, titled Sean Combs: The Reckoning, was released by Netflix on December 2, 2025.

== Selected filmography ==
Year	Title	Director	Producer	Notes	Ref.
2011	Corman's World: Exploits of a Hollywood Rebel	Yes	Yes	Feature documentary	
2018	Shut Up and Dribble	No	Yes	Docuseries	
2019	Hello, Privilege. It's Me, Chelsea	Yes	Yes	TV documentary	
2020	The Playbook	Yes	No	Docuseries	
2021	Pride	No	Yes	Docuseries	
2023	Reggie	Yes	Yes	Feature documentary	
2024	God Save Texas	Yes	No	Docuseries	
2024	How Music Got Free	Yes	No	Documentary	
2025	Sean Combs: The Reckoning	Yes	Yes	Docuseries	

== Accolades ==
- 2022- GLAAD Media Award Nominee, Pride (FX/Killer Films/Vice Studios)
- 2021- Gotham Independent Film Award Nominee, Pride (FX/Killer Films/Vice Studios)
- 2019- NAACP Image Award Nominee, Shut Up and Dribble (Showtime/Springhill Entertainment)
- 2017- Emmy Award Winner, SoCal Connected (PBS/KCET)
- 2011- Camera d'Or Award Nominee, Corman's World (A&E)
