= God Save Texas =

2024 American TV documentary series

- Directed by: Richard Linklater; Alex Stapleton; Iliana Sosa
- Music by: Graham Reynolds
- Country of origin: United States
- Original languages: English; Spanish
- No. of episodes: 3

Production
- Executive producers: Richard Linklater; Alex Gibney; Peter Berg; Michael Lombardo; Stacey Offman; Richard Perello; Elizabeth Rogers; Lawrence Wright; Nancy Abraham; Lisa Heller
- Producers: Nell Constantinople; Danielle Mynard; Meghan O'Hara
- Cinematography: Brian Dawson; EJ Enríquez; Shane F. Kelly; Arlene Nelson; Judy Phu; Paul Raila; Graham Willoughby
- Editors: Spencer Averick; Paul Greenhouse; Lorena Luciano; Rosella Tursi
- Production companies: HBO Documentary Films; Jigsaw Productions; Film 44

Original release
- Network: HBO
- Release: February 27 – February 28, 2024

God Save Texas is a 2024 American documentary series, directed by Richard Linklater, Alex Stapleton, and Iliana Sosa. It is inspired by the book God Save Texas: A Journey Into the Soul of the Lone Star State by Lawrence Wright. The series explores the past, present, and future of Texas.

It had its world premiere at the 2024 Sundance Film Festival on January 23, 2024. It premiered February 27, 2024, on HBO.

== Premise ==
Chronicling the past, present, and future of Texas, from the perspective of three directors. Following the prison industrial complex in Huntsville, the energy industry in Houston, and the humanity and healing following the 2019 El Paso shooting in El Paso.

== Episodes ==
| No. | Title | Directed by | Original release date |
|---|---|---|---|
| 1 | "Hometown Prison" | Richard Linklater | February 27, 2024 |
| 2 | "The Price of Oil" | Alex Stapleton | February 28, 2024 |
| 3 | "La Frontera" | Iliana Sosa | February 28, 2024 |

== Production ==
In June 2014, it was announced God Save Texas was in development at HBO, with Lawrence Wright set to write, based upon his play Sonny’s Last Shot, and Lauren Shuler Donner set to executive produce.

In March 2022, it was announced the project was instead a documentary-series with Richard Linklater set to direct an episode, with Wright still attached as executive producer, and Alex Gibney set to executive produce. While directing the episode, Linklater went on a process of search and discovery, determining an excessive amount of his high school football teammates ended up incarcerated by the prison industrial complex in Texas.

== Reception ==
The review aggregator website Rotten Tomatoes reported an 100% approval rating based on 5 critic reviews. On Metacritic, the series has a weighted average score of 84 out of 100, based on 4 critics, indicating "universal acclaim".
