= Amanda McBaine =

American film director and producer

- Occupations: Film director, producer
- Years active: 2001–present
- Spouse: Jesse Moss

Amanda McBaine is an American film director and producer. She has co-directed and produced Boys State (2020), and The Mission (2023) with Jesse Moss. She has additionally produced The Overnighters (2014), The Bandit (2016), and Mayor Pete (2021).

== Career ==
McBaine served as a co-producer on Ghosts of Attica (2001), and Speedo (2003). She has also served as a producer on The Overnighters and The Bandit.directed by Jesse Moss.

In 2020, McBaine made her directorial debut with Boys State, a documentary revolving around a thousand teenage boys attending Boys State alongside Moss, which had its world premiere at the 2020 Sundance Film Festival. It was released on August 14, 2020, by Apple TV+ and A24. In 2023, McBaine directed alongside Moss, The Mission for National Geographic Documentary Films, revolving around John Allen Chau.

== Filmography ==
as director:

- The Investigators (2008, episode: "Lone Fugitive", Court TV)
- Boys State (2020)
- The Mission (2023)
- Girls State (2024)
- Teenage Wasteland (2025)
