= 51st Telluride Film Festival =

American film festival

- Location: Telluride, Colorado, United States
- Founded: 1974
- Awards: Telluride Film Festival Silver Medallion: Jacques Audiard; Saoirse Ronan; Thelma Schoonmaker
- Artistic director: Julie Huntsinger
- Festival date: August 30 – September 2, 2024
- Website: www.telluridefilmfestival.org

Telluride Film Festival
- 52nd 50th

The 51st Telluride Film Festival took place between August 30 and September 2, 2024, in Telluride, Colorado.

American filmmaker Kenneth Lonergan was chosen as the edition's guest director, and selected six classic films for a parallel section.

The Telluride Film Festival Silver Medallion was presented to French filmmaker Jacques Audiard, Irish actress Saoirse Ronan and American editor Thelma Schoonmaker. While the Special Medallion was awarded to French film company Les Films du Losange.

Luke Dorman, the Principal Graphic Designer at Meow Wolf, returned as the Guest Designer for the festival's official poster.

== Official selection ==
The official line-up was announced, as usual, on the day before the festival's official opening.

=== Main Program ===
The following films were selected to be screened:

English title	Original title	Director(s)	Production country
All We Imagine as Light	പ്രഭയായ് നിനച്ചതെല്ലാം	Payal Kapadia	India, France, Italy, Luxembourg, Netherlands
Anora		Sean Baker	United States
Apocalypse in the Tropics	Apocalipse nos Trópicos	Petra Costa	Brazil, United States, Denmark
The Apprentice		Ali Abbasi	Canada, Denmark, Ireland, United States
Better Man		Michael Gracey	Australia
Bird		Andrea Arnold	United Kingdom, France, Germany, United States
Blink		Daniel Roher and Edmund Stenson	United States, Canada
Carville: Winning Is Everything, Stupid!		Matt Tyrnauer	United States
Conclave		Edward Berger	United Kingdom, United States
Disclaimer (7 episodes)		Alfonso Cuarón	United Kingdom, United States
Don’t Let’s Go to the Dogs Tonight		Embeth Davidtz	South Africa
Emilia Pérez		Jacques Audiard	France
The End		Joshua Oppenheimer	Ireland, Germany, Italy, Sweden, Denmark, United Kingdom
The Friend		Scott McGehee and David Siegel	United States
In Waves and War		Bonni Cohen and Jon Shenk	United States
Jean Cocteau		Lisa Immordino Vreeland	United States
Leonardo da Vinci		Ken Burns	United States
Maria		Pablo Larraín	Italy, Germany
Martha		R. J. Cutler	United States
Memoir of a Snail		Adam Elliot	Australia
Misericordia	Miséricorde	Alain Guiraudie	France, Portugal, Spain
Nickel Boys		RaMell Ross	United States
No Other Land		Basel Adra, Hamdan Ballal, Yuval Abraham and Rachel Szor	Palestine, Norway
One to One: John & Yoko		Kevin Macdonald and Sam Rice-Edwards	United Kingdom
The Outrun		Nora Fingscheidt	United Kingdom, Germany
The Piano Lesson		Malcolm Washington	United States
Piece by Piece		Morgan Neville	United States
A Real Pain		Jesse Eisenberg	Poland, United States
Santosh		Sandhya Suri	India, France, Germany, United Kingdom
Saturday Night		Jason Reitman	United States
The Seed of the Sacred Fig	دانه انجیر مقدس	Mohammad Rasoulof	Iran, Germany, France
Separated		Errol Morris	United States, Mexico
September 5		Tim Fehlbaum	Germany
Social Studies		Lauren Greenfield	United States
The White House Effect		Bonni Cohen, Jon Shenk and Pedro Kos	United States
Will & Harper		Josh Greenbaum	United States
Zurawski v Texas		Maisie Crow and Abbie Perrault	United States
Short Films
Alok		Alex Hedison	United States
A Swim Lesson		Rashida Jones and Will McCormack	United States
The Turnaround		Kyle Thrash and Ben Proudfoot	United States

=== Guest Directors' Selection ===
The following films were selected to be screened by Kenneth Lonergan:

English title	Original title	Director(s)	Production country
Arch of Triumph (1948)		Lewis Milestone	United States
Barry Lyndon (1975)		Stanley Kubrick	United States, United Kingdom
Doctor Zhivago (1965)		David Lean	United Kingdom, Italy, United States
Grand Hotel (1932)		Edmund Goulding	United States
My Darling Clementine (1946)		John Ford	United States

=== Special Screenings ===
The following films were selected to be screened:

English title	Original title	Director(s)	Production country
Beauty and the Beast (1946)	La Belle et la Bête	Jean Cocteau	France
Charles Dead or Alive (1969)	Charles mort ou vif	Alain Tanner	Switzerland
Fly		Christina Clusiau and Shaul Schwarz	United States, Australia
Hindle Wakes (1952)		Arthur Crabtree	United Kingdom
Prince of Broadway (2008)		Sean Baker	United States

=== Backlot ===
The section showcases behind-the-scenes movies and portraits of artists, musicians and filmmakers. The following films were selected to be screened:

English title	Original title	Director(s)	Production country
A Sudden Glimpse to Deeper Things		Mark Cousins	United Kingdom
¡Casa Bonita Mi Amor!		Arthur Bradford	United States
Chain Reactions		Alexandre O. Philippe	United States
The Easy Kind		Katy Chevigny	United States
Her Name Was Moviola		Howard Berry	United Kingdom
The Hexagonal Hive and a Mouse in a Maze		Tilda Swinton, Bartek Dziadosz	United Kingdom
Made in England: The Films of Powell and Pressburger		David Hinton	United Kingdom
Nobu		Matt Tyrnauer	United States
Riefenstahl		Andres Veiel	Germany
The Swallow		Tadhg O’Sullivan	Ireland

=== Filmmakers of Tomorrow ===
==== Student Prints ====
The section showcases student-produced work from around the globe, curated and introduced by Gregory Nava. The following films were selected to be screened:

English title	Original title	Director(s)	Production country / University
Dragfox		Lisa Ott	United Kingdom (National Film and Television School)
Entre Le Feu et La Claire de Lune		Dominic Yarabe	United States (Stanford University)
Neither Donkey nor Horse		Robin Wang	United States (USC School of Cinematic Arts)
Son		Saman Hosseinpuor	Iran (Isfahan Sepehr College)
The Truck		Elizabeth Rao	United States (New York University)
When Big People Lie		Gianfranco Fernández-Ruiz	United States (American Film Institute)

==== Calling Cards ====
The section showcases resonant work in cinema in the short form, curated and introduced by Barry Jenkins. The following films were selected to be screened:

English title	Original title	Director(s)	Production country
Beautiful Men		Nicolas Keppens	Belgium
Father's Letters		Alexey Evstigneev	France, Russia
Lick a Wound		Nathan Ghali	France
Water Harzard		Alexander David	France
A Move		Elahe Esmaili	Iran, United Kingdom

==== Great Expectations ====
The section is curated and introduced by Barry Jenkins. The following films were selected to be screened:

English title	Original title	Director(s)	Production country
Jimmy		Yashaddai Owens	United States, France
Two People Exchanging Saliva	Deux personnes échangeant de la salive	Alexandre Singh and Natalie Musteata	France

== Official awards ==
=== Silver Medallion ===
- Saoirse Ronan
- Jacques Audiard
- Thelma Schoonmaker

=== Special Medallion ===
- Les Films du Losange
