= Forced displacement in popular culture =

Forced displacement and the experiences of refugees, asylum seekers and otherwise forcibly displaced people became of increasing interest in the popular culture since 2015 with the European migrant crisis.

== Books ==
=== Fiction ===
- Refugee Tales: Volume II: 2 by Jackie Kay et al., 2017
- Exit West by Mohsin Hamid, 2017
- Refugee Tales, by Ali Smith et al., 2016
- What Is the What by Dave Eggers, 2006
- Refugee Boy by Benjamin Zephaniah, 2001

==== Children's books ====
- Where Will I Live? by Rosemary McCarney, 2017
- Stormy Seas. Stories of Young Boat Refugees by Mary Beth Leatherdale, 2017
- Stepping Stones. A Refugee Family's Journey by Margriet Ruurs, 2016
- Refugee by Alan Gratz, 2016

==== Poems ====
- Sisters' Entrance by Emtithal Mahmoud, 2018

=== Non-fiction ===
- The New Odyssey: The Story of Europe's Refugee Crisis by Patrick Kingsley, 2017
- Cast Away: Stories of Survival from Europe's Refugee Crisis by Charlotte McDonald-Gibson, 2017
- Refuge: Transforming a Broken Refugee System by Alexander Betts and Paul Collier, 2017
- Violent Borders: Refugees and the Right to Move by Reece Jones, 2017
- A Hope More Powerful Than the Sea by Melissa Fleming, 2017
- Refugee Stories: Seven personal journeys behind the headlines by Dave Smith, 2016
- City of Thorns: Nine Lives in the World's Largest Refugee Camp by Ben Rawlence, 2016
- The Morning They Came for Us: Dispatches from Syria by Janine di Giovanni, 2016
- Refugee Economies: Forced Displacement and Development by Alexander Betts et al., 2016
- The Making of the Modern Refugee by Peter Gatrell, 2015
- The Lightless Sky: My Journey to Safety as a Child Refugee, by Gulwali Passarlay, 2015
- Human Cargo: A Journey Among Refugees by Caroline Moorehead, 2006
- They Poured Fire on Us From the Sky by Judy A. Bernstein, 2005, is the story three of the Lost Boys of Sudan
- Escape From Manus, 2021 autobiography by Jaivet Ealom

== Film ==
=== Drama ===
- Drift by Anthony Chen, 2023
- The Other Side of Hope by Aki Kaurismäki, 2017
- Pawo by Marvin Litwak, 2016
- Mediterranea by Jonas Carpignano, 2015
- Ohthes by Panos Karkanevatos, 2015
- Hope by Boris Lojkine, 2014
- The Golden Dream by Diego Quemada-Díez, 2013
- Le Havre by Aki Kaurismäki, 2011
- In This World by Michael Winterbottom, 2002
- Baran by Majid Majidi, 2001
- Last Resort by Paweł Pawlikowski, 2000

=== Fantasy ===
- Encanto by Jared Bush and Byron Howard, 2021

=== Documentary ===
- Mediha by Hasan Oswald, 2023
- Island of the Hungry Ghosts by Gabrielle Brady, 2018
- Stop the boats by Simon V. Kurian, 2018
- Watan by James L. Brown and Bill Irving, 2018
- Human Flow by Ai Weiwei, 2017
- Warehoused: The forgotten refugees of Dadaab by Asher Emmanuel and Vincent Vittorio, 2017
- Refugee by Alexander J. Farrell, 2017
- Re-Calais by Yann Moix, 2017
- 69 Minutes of 86 Days by Egil Håskjold Larsen, 2017
- Hope Road by Tom Zubrycki, 2017
- Sea Sorrow by Vanessa Redgrave, 2017
- 8 Borders, 8 Days by Amanda Bailly, 2017
- Fire at Sea by Gianfranco Rosi, 2016
- Ta'ang by Wang Bing, 2016
- 4.1 Miles by Daphne Matziaraki, 2016
- Influx by Luca Vullo, 2016
- The Art of Moving by Liliana Dulce Marinho de Sousa, 2016
- Between Fences by Avi Mograbi, 2016
- Stranger in Paradise by Guido Hendrikx, 2016
- Rifles or Graffiti by Jordi Oriola Folch, 2016
- Born in Syria by Hernán Zin, 2016
- The Invisible City: Kakuma by Lieven Corthouts, 2016
- Salam Neighbor by Chris Temple and Zach Ingrasci, 2015
- Beats of the Antonov by Hajooj Kuka, 2014
- On The Bride's Side by Antonio Augugliaro et al., 2014
- Moving to Mars by Mat Whitecross, 2009
- Lost Boys of Sudan by Megan Mylan and Jon Shenk, 2003

=== Short film ===
- I am Rebecca by Eve Doherty and Kate McCaslin, 2017
- I felt it too by Iamia Aboukheir, 2017
- Only My Voice by Myriam Rey, 2017
- Refugee by Joyce Chen and Emily Moore, 2016
- Refugee by Adam Tyler, 2016
- Lifestories: The Lost Boys of Sudan by J.D. Martin, 2008

=== TV series ===
- Exodus: Our Journey was shown on BBC Two in 2017. It started with 3 episodes called Exodus: Our Journey to Europe and was followed by 3 episodes called Exodus: Our Journey Continues

== Theatre ==
- The Claim by Tim Cowbury and Mark Maughan, 2017
- The Jungle by Joe Murphy and Joe Robertson, 2017
- Fireworks by Dalia Taha and Richard Twyman, 2015
- Refugee Boy by Lemn Sissay, 2013
- Refugees by Zlatko Topčić, 1999

== Painting ==
- Refugees by Jēkabs Kazaks, 1917

== See also ==
- Asylum seekers
- Lost Boys of Sudan#Books, films and plays
- Refugees
- Refugee employment
