= Robert J. Goldston =

American astrophysics professor

Robert James Goldston (born May 6, 1950) is a professor of astrophysics at Princeton University and a former director of the Princeton Plasma Physics Laboratory.

== Early life and education ==
Goldston was born in Cleveland, Ohio in 1950, the son of Eli Goldston, a lawyer and business executive, and Elaine Friedman Goldston, a medical social worker. He has one sister, Dian. Goldston attended public schools in Shaker Heights, Ohio, until 1962, when his father became president of Eastern Gas and Fuel Associates of Boston, Massachusetts, and the family moved to nearby Cambridge. Goldston attended Browne and Nichols, a private day school, for two years before moving to Commonwealth School for high school. During high school, he spent a summer working with the American Friends Service Committee as a community organizer in Lexington, Kentucky.

He attended Harvard University where he originally considered becoming a psychotherapist. After spending a semester at the Esalen Institute in California, he realized he preferred to study physics. The summer after his junior year, Goldston worked on the construction of a tokamak. After graduation in 1972, he entered a doctoral program in physics at Princeton University. During the five-year course of study, Goldston also worked as a research assistant. In 1974, he married the former Ruth Berger, a psychologist.

== Career ==
After receiving his Ph.D. in 1977, Goldston was offered a staff position at the Princeton Plasma Physics Laboratory. His early work there involved studying how plasmas are heated by energetic ions, with the ultimate goal being the construction of a fusion reactor, a device that would generate fusion reactions of light nuclei rather than fission reactions of heavy nuclei. In a 1979 interview, Goldston explained the significance of his research: "If we can accomplish this, we will have created an inexhaustible fuel, which will burn without leaving the quantities of dangerous radioactive waste generated by the atomic power plants we have now."

Later that decade, Goldston produced physical evidence that fast ions circulating in toroidal magnetically confined plasmas such as the tokamak configuration slowed down in good agreement with classical collision theory, thus providing a physical underpinning for the further development of the powerful neutral beam systems which have heated and driven electric current in successive generations of tokamaks and other magnetic plasma confinement devices such as stellarators. Over the following two decades, Goldston led several experimental efforts studying the physics and efficacy of heating tokamak plasmas with neutral beams, discovering along the way a type of instability that could eject energetic beam ions if the neutral beam system was aimed too orthogonally with respect to the tokamak plasma. He also explored a number of other loss mechanisms for energetic ions. This proved crucial in determining the range of angles over which future neutral beam systems could access toroidal plasma configurations.

Drawing upon a wide body of experimental data from most of the tokamaks then operating, Goldston developed the first widely applicable empirical scaling relationship for the confinement of energy in tokamak plasmas as a function of such parameters as the major radius, minor radius, density, current, and heating power from such sources as neutral beam systems. This scaling relationship, which came to be known as “Goldston Scaling,” provided a predictive tool for estimating the performance of tokamaks, and found wide utility, eventually forming the starting point for later energy confinement scalings based upon much larger analyses of data from successive generations of tokamaks. The better the energy confinement in a tokamak, the less external power would be required to heat it to the temperature at which nuclear fusion reactions would proceed rapidly enough to yield net electrical power production.

In the 1980s, Goldston led the physics research team on the Tokamak Fusion Test Reactor at Princeton for the United States Department of Energy. In 1988, he, along with James D. Strachan and Richard J. Hawryluk, was awarded the Dawson Prize of the American Physical Society for the discovery of a tokamak operating regime with greatly improved confinement, which came to be referred to as the "supershot regime."

In the early 1990s, Goldston led the physics design teams for two efforts to develop designs for more advanced tokamaks. The first, the Compact Ignition Tokamak, which was intended to be a relatively low cost device to heat a plasma to conditions such that the energy released by its nuclear fusion reactions is sufficient to keep the process going, eventually evolved into the Tokamak Physics Experiment, which was not intended to reach ignition, but rather to explore more complex and dynamic methods for controlling and augmenting the confinement and stability of tokamak plasmas. This design, in turn, formed the starting point for the eventual design of the KSTAR tokamak, the presently operating flagship tokamak of the South Korean nuclear fusion program.

In 1992, Goldston was appointed as a professor in the Princeton University Astrophysics and Astronomy Department, and in 1997 he was appointed Director of the Princeton Plasma Physics Laboratory. He has also served, since its founding, as a member of the Science and Technology Advisory Committee of the ITER international tokamak project being constructed in the Provence region of France. In 1995 he co-wrote a textbook, Introduction to Plasma Physics.

Goldston’s fusion work since stepping down as the director of PPPL focuses on plasma-material interfaces in the context of building energy-producing tokamaks. He developed a heuristic model for how heat escapes a tokamak, which successfully predicted measurements in existing machines.

In 1987 he was elected a Fellow of the American Physical Society "for outstanding theoretical and experimental contributions to the understanding of transport and heating of tokamak plasmas"

== Disarmament ==
Goldston has been a long-time advocate of nuclear disarmament. In 2013, he, Boaz Barak, and Alexander Glaser worked to design a "zero-knowledge" system to verify that warheads designated for disarmament are actually what they purport to be. By directing high-energy neutrons into the warhead under investigation, and comparing the distribution passing through to the distribution that passed through a known warhead, inspectors can determine whether a warhead being disarmed is genuine or a ruse designed to evade treaty requirements, without leaking nuclear secrets. For this work, Foreign Policy magazine named them to their 2014 list of 100 Leading Global Thinkers.

== Sources ==
Books

- Physicist: Rob's Job Is to Put the Sun in a Bottle. Sauk Centre, Minnesota: Vocational Biographies. 1979.
- Goldston, R.J.; Rutherford, P.H. (1995). Introduction to Plasma Physics. New York: CRC Press. ISBN 9781439822074.

Articles

- Goldston, R. J. (1975). "Charge-exchange spectra near the injection energy in tokamaks equipped with tangential neutral beams—experiment and theory". Nuclear Fusion. 15 (4): 651–655. doi:10.1088/0029-5515/15/4/011.
- Goldston, R. J.; White, R.B.; Boozer, A.H. (August 1981). "Confinement of High-Energy Trapped Particles in Tokamaks". Physical Review Letters. 47 (9): 647–649. Bibcode:1981PhRvL..47..647G. doi:10.1103/physrevlett.47.647.
- Goldston, R. J.; Towner, H.H. (October 1981). "Effects of toroidal field ripple on suprathermal ions in tokamak plasmas". Journal of Plasma Physics. 26 (2): 283–307. Bibcode:1981JPlPh..26..283G. doi:10.1017/S0022377800010680.
- Goldston, Robert J. (1984). "Energy confinement scaling in Tokamaks: some implications of recent experiments with Ohmic and strong auxiliary heating". Plasma Physics and Controlled Fusion. 26 (1A): 87–103. Bibcode:1984PPCF...26...87G. doi:10.1088/0741-3335/26/1A/308.
- Goldston, R. J.; Kaita, R.; Beiersdorfer, P.; Gammel, G.; Herndon, D.L.; McCune, D.C.; Meyerhofer, D.D. (1987). "Charge exchange measurements of MHD activity during neutral beam injection in the Princeton Large Torus and the Poloidal Divertor Experiment". Nuclear Fusion. 27 (6): 921–929. doi:10.1088/0029-5515/27/6/004.
- Goldston, R. J. (1996). "Physics of the steady-state advanced tokamak". Physics of Plasmas. 3 (5): 794. Bibcode:1996PhPl....3.1794G. doi:10.1063/1.871698.

Newspapers

- "Dian Goldston Bride of R. S. Smith". New York Times. September 1, 1969.
- "Eli Goldston, Lawyer, Is Dead; Headed Eastern Gas and Fuel". New York Times. January 22, 1974.
- "Bouillabaisse sushi". The Economist. February 4, 2004.
- Mohan, Geoffrey (June 26, 2014). "Fusing physics, cryptography to solve a nuclear inspection paradox". Los Angeles Times.

Website

- "1988 John Dawson Award for Excellence in Plasma Physics Research Recipient". APS Physics.
- "A World Disrupted: Leading Global Thinkers of 2014". Foreign Policy. Archived from the original on 1 January 2015.
