= The White House Effect =

2024 documentary film

The White House Effect is a 2024 documentary film directed by Pedro Kos, Jon Shenk and Bonni Cohen, revolving around President George H. W. Bush's attempts at climate change.

== Synopsis ==
Using exclusively archival footage, it investigates the role played by the administration enacting policies to reduce global warming alongside the battle between environmentalist turned Administrator of the Environmental Protection Agency William K. Reilly in odds with Bush Sr.'s chief of staff John H. Sununu.

=== People featured in the film ===
- Belinda Carlisle (whose song "Heaven is a Place on Earth" played at the beginning of the film)
- Jimmy Carter
- Ronald Reagan
- Stephen Schneider
- The aforementioned William K. Reilly
- The aforementioned John H. Sununu
- Dan Rather
- Al Gore
- Dana Carvey
- Alex Trebek
- Tom Brokaw
- Ted Koppel
- Rush Limbaugh
- Peter Jennings
- Saddam Hussein

== Accolades ==
One of four finalists of the Library of Congress Lavine/Ken Burns Prize for Film, The White House Effect, received $25,000.

It was also nominated for the prestigious Peabody Award.

== See also ==
- Koyaanisqatsi - cult 1982 experimental documentary featured in the film
- MTV - also featured in the film
- Exxon Valdez oil spill
