= Eli Goldston =

American business leader (1920 - 1974)

- Born: March 8, 1920; Warren, Ohio
- Died: January 21, 1974 (aged 53)
- Education: Harvard University (BA, MBA, LLB)
- Occupations: Eastern Gas and Fuel Associates of Boston, Massachusetts (President & CEO 1961–1974)
- Children: Robert J. Goldston

Eli Goldston (March 8, 1920 - January 21, 1974) was an American business leader and a leading spokesman for corporate social responsibility. He was President and CEO of Eastern Gas and Fuel Associates of Boston, Massachusetts, from 1961 until 1974.

== Early life and education ==
Eli Goldston was born on March 8, 1920, in Warren, Ohio. He was educated at Harvard University (A.B. 1942), Harvard Business School (M.B.A. 1946), and Harvard Law School (LL.B. 1949.).

== Career ==
As chief executive of Eastern Gas and Fuel, Goldston ran diversified energy corporation with 19 subsidiaries in the bituminous coal, coke, gas utility and river-ocean marine industries.

He was best known, however, for his belief that liberal politics and corporate success could go hand in hand. He is quoted as having said: "I don't believe that business, alone, can solve our social problems. Neither do I believe it, alone, has caused them. But they'll not get solved unless innovative businessmen, who sense a changing world and feel challenged, react in a fashion likely to produce profit as well as imaginative response to social need."

Goldston's most visible legacy is the Rainbow Swash, a giant 1971 artwork by Corita Kent that Goldston commissioned on a 140-foot (43 m) tall liquefied natural gas tank facing Boston's Southeast Expressway. The artwork was added to another gas tank on the Dorchester waterfront in 1992 when the original LNG tank was torn down. The Rainbow Swash is reportedly the largest copyrighted work of art in the world. The mural drew controversy when critics believed they saw the face of Vietnamese leader Ho Chi Minh's face in its blue stripe, which Goldston and Kent both denied.

== Death and legacy ==
Goldston died on January 21, 1974.

Two professorships at Harvard University, one in the law school and one in the business school, were established in his memory, "join their skills and commitments in teaching, research and course development … to improve social conditions through men and women trained and motivated in management and legal fields." Goldston also established two funds at Harvard Law School, the Issachar J. Goldston Memorial Scholarship and the Gertrude R. Goldston Scholarship. His son is physicist Robert J. Goldston.
