= KSTAR =

Nuclear fusion research facility in South Korea

Korea Superconducting Tokamak Advanced Research
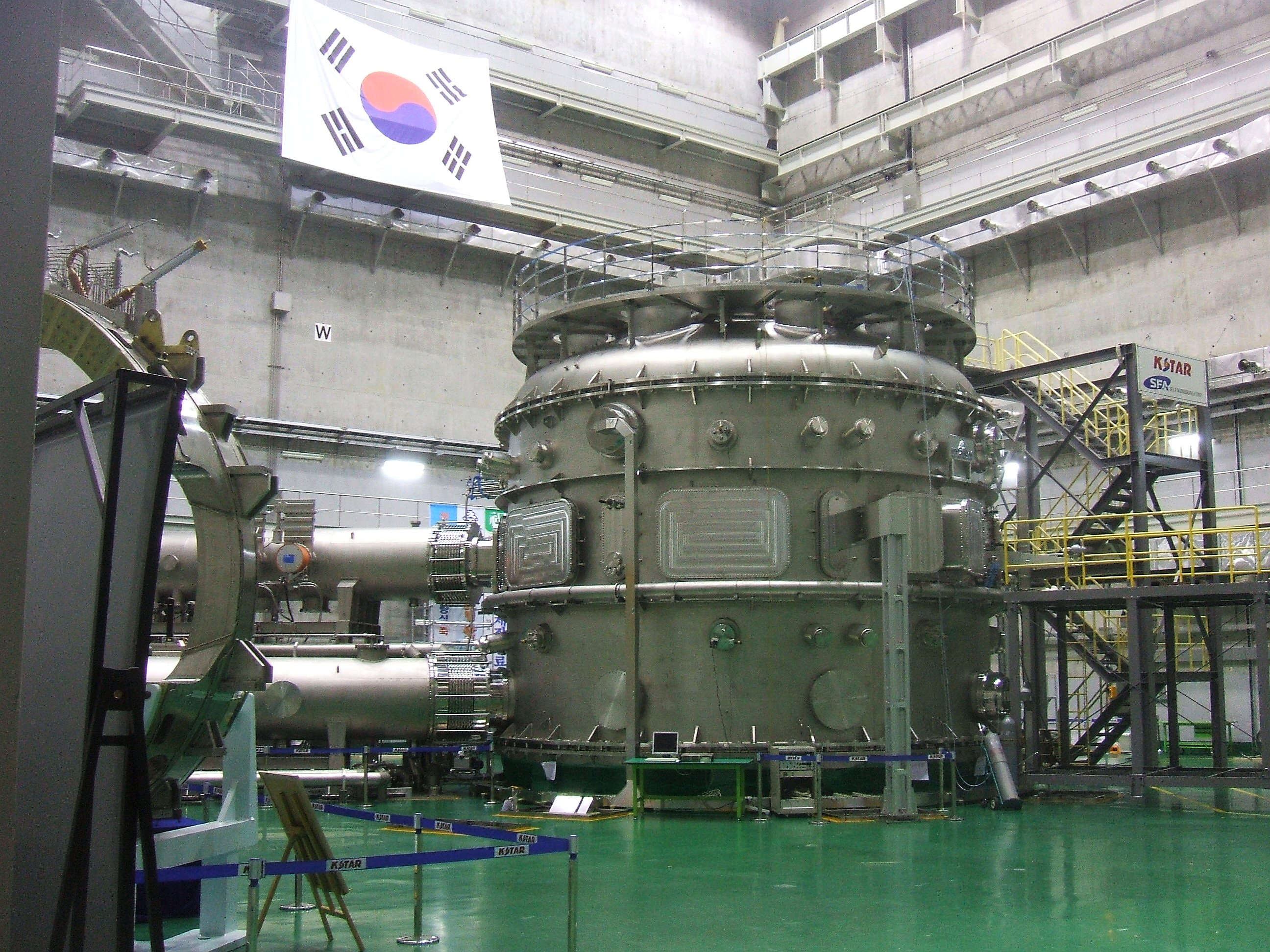
- Device type: Tokamak
- Location: Daejeon, South Korea
- Affiliation: Korea Institute of Fusion Energy

Technical specifications
- Major radius: 1.8 m (5 ft 11 in)
- Minor radius: 0.5 m (1 ft 8 in)
- Magnetic field: 3.5 T (35,000 G)
- Heating power: 14 MW
- Plasma current: 2 MA

History
- Date(s) of construction: 14 September 2007
- Year(s) of operation: 2008–present

The KSTAR (or Korea Superconducting Tokamak Advanced Research; Korean: 초전도 핵융합연구장치, literally "superconductive nuclear fusion research device") is a magnetic fusion device at the Korea Institute of Fusion Energy in Daejeon, South Korea. It is intended to study aspects of magnetic fusion energy that will be pertinent to the ITER fusion project as part of that country's contribution to the ITER effort. The project was approved in 1995, but construction was delayed by the East Asian financial crisis, which weakened the South Korean economy considerably; however, the project's construction phase was completed on 14 September 2007. The first plasma was achieved in June 2008.

== Description ==
KSTAR is one of the first research tokamaks in the world to feature fully superconducting magnets, which again will be of great relevance to ITER as this will also use superconducting magnets. The KSTAR magnet system consists of 16 niobium–tin direct current toroidal field magnets, 10 niobium–tin alternating current poloidal field magnets and 4 niobium-titanium alternating current poloidal field magnets. It is planned that the reactor will study plasma pulses of up to 20 seconds duration until 2011 when it will be upgraded to study pulses of up to 300 seconds duration. The reactor vessel will have a major radius of 1.8 m, a minor radius of 0.5 m, a maximum toroidal field of 3.5 Tesla, and a maximum plasma current of 2 megaampere. As with other tokamaks, heating and current drive will be initiated using neutral beam injection, ion cyclotron resonance heating (ICRH), radio frequency heating, and electron cyclotron resonance heating (ECRH). Initial heating power will be 8 megawatt from neutral beam injection upgradeable to 24 MW, 6 MW from ICRH upgradeable to 12 MW, and at present undetermined heating power from ECRH and RF heating. The experiment will use both hydrogen and deuterium fuels but not the deuterium-tritium mix which will be studied in ITER.

== Plasma confinement ==
Beginning in December 2016, KSTAR would repeatedly hold the world record (longest high-confinement mode) by confining and maintaining a hydrogen plasma at a higher temperature and for a longer time than any other reactor. While KSTAR focuses on central ion plasma temperature, EAST focuses on electron plasma temperature.

- December 2016, KSTAR claims record by containing a plasma at 50 million degrees Celsius for 70 seconds.
- July 2017, China's Experimental Advanced Superconducting Tokamak (EAST) (101.2 seconds) claims record by containing a plasma for 100 seconds.
- December 2020, KSTAR reclaimed the record by containing a plasma of 100 million degrees for 20 seconds.
- May 2021, China's EAST reclaimed the record by containing a plasma of 120 million degrees for 100 seconds.

== Timeline ==
The design was based on Tokamak Physics Experiment, which was based on Compact Ignition Tokamak design – See Robert J. Goldston.

- 1995 – Started Project KSTAR
- 1997 – JET of EU emits 17 MW energy from itself.
- 1998 – JT-60U went beyond energy junction successfully and acknowledged the possibility of commercialization of nuclear fusion.
- 2006 – Life span of three Fusion Reactors (JT-60U, JET, and DIII-D) are terminated.
- 2007, September – KSTAR's major devices are constructed.
- 2008, July – First plasma occurred. Maintenance time: 0.865 seconds, Temperature: 2×10^{6} K
- 2009 – Maintained 320,000A plasma for 3.6 seconds.
- 2010, November – First H-mode plasma run.
- 2011 – Maintained high-temperature plasma for 5.2 seconds, Temperature: ~50×10^{6} K, successfully fully deterred ELM (Edge-Localized Mode), first ever in the World.
- 2012 – Maintained high-temperature plasma for 17 seconds, Temperature: 50×10^{6} K
- 2013 – Maintained high-temperature plasma for 20 seconds, Temperature: 50×10^{6} K
- 2014 – Maintained high-temperature plasma for 45 seconds, and successfully fully deterred ELM for 5 seconds.
- 2015 – Maintained high-temperature plasma for 55 seconds, Temperature: 50×10^{6} K
- 2016 – Maintained high-temperature plasma for 70 seconds, Temperature: 50×10^{6} K, and successfully made ITB-mode for 7 secs.
- 2017 – Maintained high-temperature plasma for 72 seconds, Temperature: 70×10^{6} K, and successfully fully deterred ELM for 34 seconds, using 9.5 MW heating system.
- 2019 – Maintained high-temperature plasma for 1.5 seconds, Temperature: >100×10^{6} K.
- 2020, March – Maintained high-temperature plasma for 8 seconds, Temperature: >100×10^{6} K (Mean temperature: >97×10^{6} K)
- 2020, November – Maintained high-temperature plasma for 20 seconds, Temperature: >100×10^{6} K.
- 2021, November – Maintained high-temperature plasma for 30 seconds, Temperature: >100×10^{6} K.
- 2022, September – Maintained high-temperature plasma for 30 seconds, Temperature: >100×10^{6} K.
- 2024, February – Maintained high-temperature plasma for 48 seconds, Temperature: >100×10^{6} K.
