= Pedro Kos =

Brazilian-American director

- Born: Rio de Janeiro, Brazil
- Occupations: Director, editor
- Years active: 2008–present

Pedro Kos is a Brazilian-American film director and editor. He has directed Bending the Arc (2017), Rebel Hearts (2021), Lead Me Home (2021), In Our Blood (2024), and The White House Effect (2024).

== Early life ==
Kos was born in Rio de Janeiro, and raised between there, New York City, and Miami, Florida. He received his Bachelor of Arts degree in Theater Directing from Yale University.

== Career ==
Kos served as editor on Waste Land directed by Lucy Walker, The Island President by Jon Shenk, The Crash Reel directed by Walker, and The Square directed by Jehane Noujaim, for which he earned an Emmy for Outstanding Picture Editing for Nonfiction Programming.

In 2017, Kos co-directed alongside Kief Davidson, Bending the Arc a documentary film revolving around doctors and humanitarians devoted to health care in impoverished nations.

In 2020, Kos served as producer and writer on The Great Hack directed by Noujaim and Karim Amer, which received a Primetime Emmy Award for Outstanding Documentary or Nonfiction Special nomination.

In 2021, Kos directed, wrote, and produced Rebel Hearts, a documentary revolving around nuns at Immaculate Heart College. It had its world premiere at the 2021 Sundance Film Festival, and was acquired by Discovery+ for a June 2021, release. That same year, Kos co-directed with Jon Shenk, Lead Me Home for Netflix, receiving an Academy Award for Best Documentary Short Film nomination.

In 2024, Kos made his narrative debut with In Our Blood a horror-thriller revolving around a documentary filmmaker reuniting with her estranged mother. It had its world premiere at the Fantasia International Film Festival in July 2024. That same year, Kos co-directed with Jon Shenk and Bonni Cohen, The White House Effect a documentary revolving around climate change.

== Personal life ==
Kos is gay.
