= Sepehr (disambiguation) =

Sepehr is a Persian name. It may also refer to:

- Sepehr (radar), over-the-horizon radar produced by Iran
- Sepehr Tower, building in Tehran, Iran
- Isfahan Sepehr College, educational institution in Isfahan, Iran
