= Rebel Hearts (film) =

2021 American documentary film

- Theatrical release poster
- Directed by: Pedro Kos
- Written by: Erin Barnett; Pedro Kos; Shawnee Isaac Smith
- Produced by: Kira Carstensen; Shawnee Isaac-Smith; Judy Korin
- Starring: Anita Caspary; Helen Kelley; Corita Kent; Pat Reif
- Cinematography: Clay Westervelt; Emily Topper
- Edited by: Pedro Kos; Erin Barnett; Yaniv Elani; Ondine Rarey
- Music by: Ariel Marx
- Production companies: Merman; Anchor Entertainment; Level Forward; XTR; Artemis Rising Foundation; Whitewater Films
- Distributed by: Discovery+
- Release dates: January 29, 2021 (Sundance); June 25, 2021 (United States)
- Running time: 99 minutes
- Country: United States
- Language: English

Rebel Hearts is a 2021 American documentary film, directed, produced, and edited by Pedro Kos. The film follows nuns at the Immaculate Heart College.

It had its world premiere at the 2021 Sundance Film Festival on January 29, 2021. It was released in a limited release on June 25, 2021, prior to digital streaming on Discovery+ on June 27, 2021.

== Synopsis ==
The film follows a group of progressive nuns at the Immaculate Heart College, including Anita Caspary, Helen Kelley, and Corita Kent as they made sure women received degrees, and transformed the education system.

== Production ==
Shawnee Isaac-Smith had the idea of making a documentary film revolving around the nuns at Immaculate Heart College, and conducted over 50 interviews with the nuns, however, ran into difficulty securing financing. Isaac-Smith saved the interviews until she found the right creative partners, which would ultimately be twenty years later, when Pedro Kos and Kira Carstensen would join as producer, and director, respectively. Once Kos joined the production, production resumed and they shot additional footage for the film.

== Release ==
The film had its world premiere at the 2021 Sundance Film Festival on January 29, 2021. Shortly after, Discovery+ acquired distribution rights to the film. It also screened at AFI Docs on June 23, 2021. It was released in a limited release on June 25, 2021, prior to digital streaming on June 27, 2021, on Discovery+.

== Critical reception ==
Rebel Hearts received positive reviews from film critics. It holds a 90% approval rating on review aggregator website Rotten Tomatoes, based on 21 reviews, with a weighted average of 7.80/10.
