= Bending the Arc =

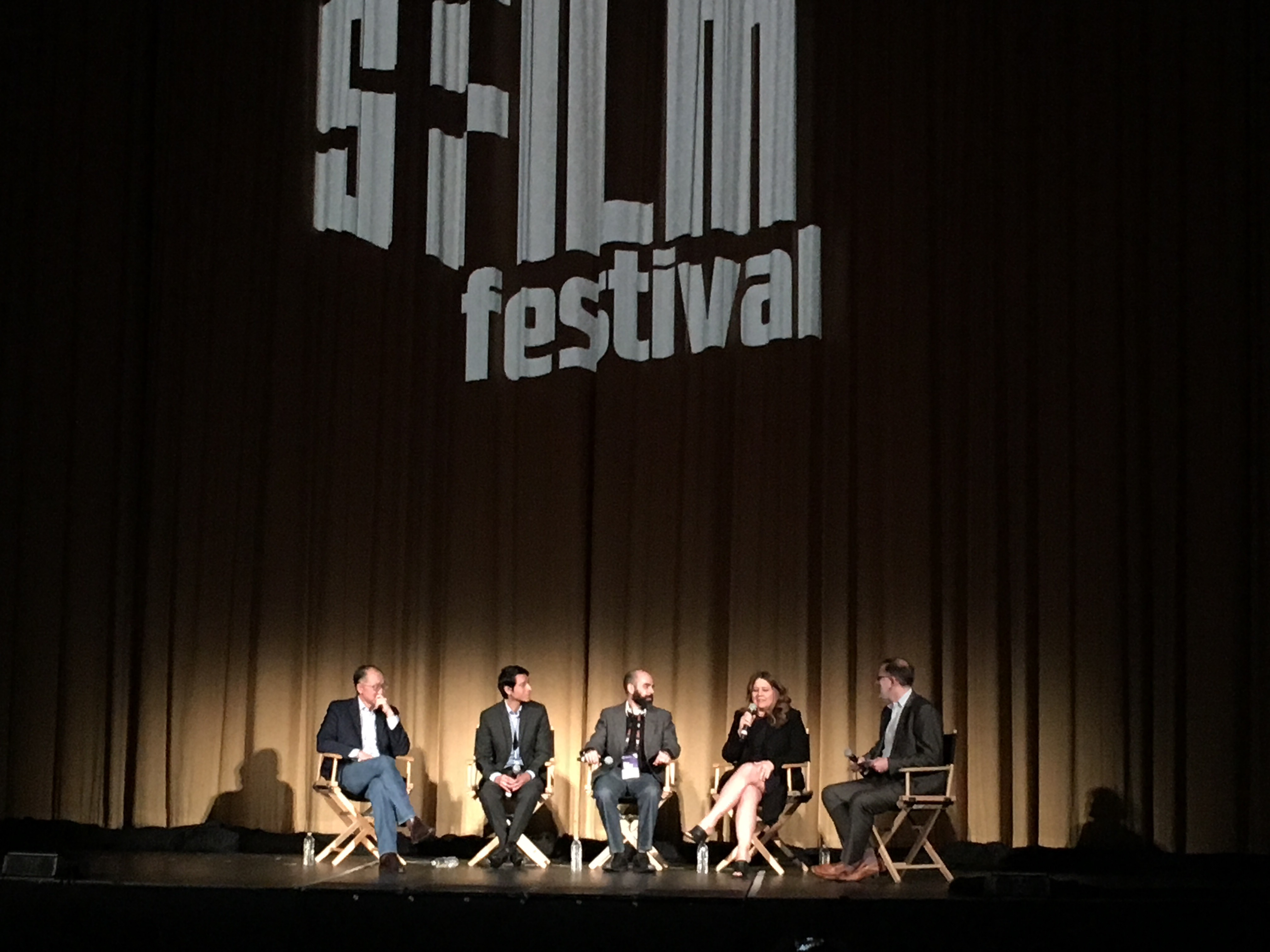
- Dr. Jim Kim, a Partners in Health patient, Pedro Kos, and Cori Shepherd Stern discuss the film at the SF Film Festival on April 14, 2017
- Directed by: Kief Davidson, Pedro Kos
- Written by: Cori Shepherd Stern
- Produced by: Cori Shepherd Stern, Executive producers: Matt Damon and Ben Affleck
- Starring: Jim Yong Kim, Paul Farmer, Ophelia Dahl, Agnes Binagwaho
- Cinematography: David Murdock, Guy Mossman, Joshua Dreyfus
- Edited by: Pedro Kos, Yuki Aizawa
- Production company: Impact Partners
- Release date: January 23, 2017 (Sundance)
- Running time: 102 minutes
- Country: United States
- Language: English

Bending the Arc is a 2017 documentary film. It tells the story of Partners in Health and doctors and humanitarians, Jim Yong Kim, Ophelia Dahl, and Paul Farmer, who are devoted to innovative health care in impoverished nations. Directors Kief Davidson and Pedro Kos follow their ongoing struggle to treat and eradicate tuberculosis and HIV/AIDS in rural areas of Haiti, Peru, and Rwanda.

== Synopsis ==
Paul Farmer and Jim Yong Kim met at Harvard Medical School in the 1980s and were both drawn to medicine by a shared desire for social justice. Along with activist Ophelia Dahl, they decided to try and make quality healthcare available to those in poor countries. They raised funding and opened a clinic in rural Haiti, but realized they needed to incorporate more community work to realize their goals. Through dramatically increased cultural sensitivity, pointed listening skills, local partnerships, and home visits, treatment drastically improved, leading to Partners In Health. The film follows their story from their beginnings in Haiti, to treating multi-drug-resistant tuberculosis in Peru, and advocating for and implementing antiretroviral HIV therapy in Rwanda alongside Dr. Agnes Binagwaho.

== Production ==
The directors of Bending the Arc, Kief Davidson and Pedro Kos, primarily use a traditional documentary format, mixing earlier video footage and current interviews to tell the story of how Jim Kim, Ophelia Dahl, and Paul Farmer developed Partners in Health. Where they deviate a bit is in showing older footage to their protagonists, in order to elicit their present-day reactions.

== Release ==
The film has been screened at Sundance Film Festival, Miami International Film Festival, and the San Francisco Film Festival.

At the Greenwich International Film Festival in 2017, it won Best Documentary Feature Film.
