= Rainbow Swash =

Gas tank in Boston, Massachusetts, US

Coordinates: 42°18′5.23″N 71°2′42.6″W

The Rainbow Swash is the common name for an untitled work by Corita Kent in the Dorchester neighborhood of Boston, Massachusetts. The rainbow design painted on a 140-foot (43 m) tall LNG storage tank was copyrighted in 1972, and was claimed to be the largest copyrighted work of art at the time. Highly visible from daily commuters' drives on Interstate 93, it is considered one of the major landmarks of Boston, akin to the Citgo sign.

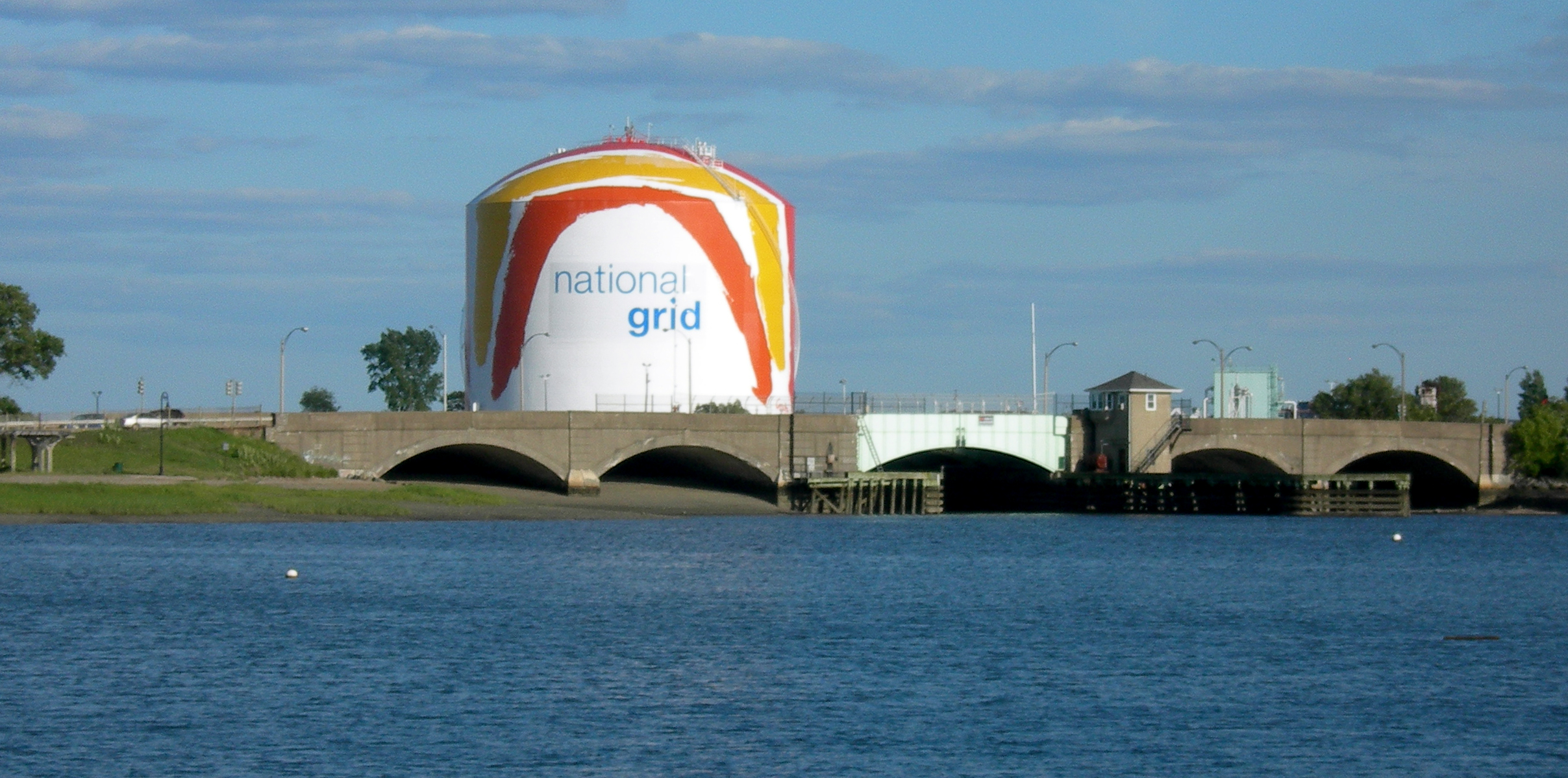
Boston gas tank

== Description ==
Originally created in 1971, the Rainbow Swash comprises large streaks of rainbow colors over a natural gas storage tank on Dorchester's waterfront, about two miles (3 km) south of Downtown Boston. The landmark 140-foot (43 m) design is highly visible from the Southeast Expressway and passed by hundreds of thousands of commuters daily.

== History ==
In 1971, the president of Boston Gas, Eli Goldston, commissioned Kent to paint the Rainbow Swash design on one of two adjacent LNG tanks facing the Southeast Expressway. She painted the original design on an 8-inch (20 cm) scale model, and 20 painters reproduced the work on the tank.

Since the 1970s, the Rainbow Swash has been criticized as purportedly featuring a profile of the North Vietnamese Communist leader Ho Chi Minh's face in its blue stripe. Kent was a peace activist, and some believe she was protesting the Vietnam War, but Kent herself always denied embedding such a profile.

The original tank was demolished in 1992, and the design transferred to the other, about 250 feet to the east, despite objections from veterans groups. However, the blue stripe is less pronounced in the 1992 version.

The branding beneath the rainbow has changed with the tank's owner: first Boston Gas, then KeySpan in 2000, and National Grid in 2007.

== Incidents ==
A noted photographer, James Prigoff, was added to a Department of Homeland Security database after photographing the Rainbow Swash. The ACLU of California sued the Federal Government in 2014, calling into question the legality of the Suspicious Activity Reporting program which was used to report the photographer. In February 2019 the Ninth Court of Appeals affirmed an earlier finding for the government.
