= Sepehr =

Sepehr (Persian: سپهر) is a Persian masculine given name and a surname. It means celestial sphere. Notable people with the name include:

== Given name ==
- Sepehr Heydari (born 1980), Iranian football player
- Sepehr Mohammadi (born 1989), Iranian futsal player
- Sepehr Salimi (born 1981), Iranian blogger and activist

== Surname ==
- Ahmad Ali Sepehr (1889–1976), Iranian historian and politician
- Mohammad Taqi Sepehr (1801–1880), Iranian court historian

== See also ==
- Shahin & Sepehr, Iranian-American guitarist duo
- Sepehr (disambiguation)
