= Nolan R. Williams =

American neuroscientist (1982–2025)

Nolan Ryan Williams
- Born: June 25, 1982; Bamberg, South Carolina
- Died: October 8, 2025 (aged 43); Northern California
- Cause of death: Suicide
- Education: College of Charleston (2003), Medical University of South Carolina (2008)
- Occupation: Neuropsychiatrist
- Known for: SAINT, ibogaine research
- Medical career
- Institutions: Stanford Brain Stimulation Lab
- Website: bsl.stanford.edu

Nolan R. Williams (June 25, 1982 – October 8, 2025) was an American neuropsychiatrist who made "transformative" contributions in treating depression by helping optimize transcranial magnetic stimulation (TMS) therapy.

== Early life ==
Nolan Ryan Williams was born on June 25, 1982, in South Carolina, where he received his education. He was born and raised in "the Lowcountry" near Charleston, South Carolina and later moved to that city. He was a Taekwondo black belt and champion in high school. He attended the College of Charleston for his undergraduate education.

== Research and career ==
He attended the Medical University of South Carolina for his MD degree, where he then trained in both neurology and psychiatry residencies. After this, he "joined the faculty at Stanford University School of Medicine, where he rose to the rank of Professor of Psychiatry and Behavioral Sciences and was Director of the Stanford Brain Stimulation Lab."

He helped develop a protocol to speed and target the use of TMS into a method known as SAINT, for Stanford Accelerated Intelligent Neuromodulation Therapy. SAINT is also referred to as SNT, for Stanford Neuromodulation Therapy, in the medical literature. It was first called "spaced-TMS, but as ... Williams saw how powerful it was, he changed the name to the more angelic 'SAINT TMS' ... Then, he had to change it again, after a journal reviewer complained that we shouldn't mix religious language with medical treatment. So, SAINT became SNT."

In 2024, he became an elected member of the American College of Neuropsychopharmacology.

The nonprofit organization Veterans Exploring Treatment Solutions (VETS) partnered with Williams to study ibogaine in those with traumatic brain injury and said in a statement that "his research demonstrated what these veterans courageously believed: That healing was possible, that their suffering mattered, and that science could meet them in their darkest hour." Williams appeared in the 2024 film In Waves and War, which in part documented that study.

== Personal life ==
Williams was married to Kristin Raj and they had two children. He died from suicide at age 43.
