= An Inconvenient Sequel: Truth to Power =

2017 documentary

- Theatrical release poster
- Directed by: Bonni Cohen; Jon Shenk
- Written by: Al Gore
- Produced by: Jeff Skoll; Richard Berge; Diane Weyermann
- Starring: Al Gore
- Cinematography: Jon Shenk
- Edited by: Don Bernier; Colin Nusbaum
- Music by: Jeff Beal
- Production companies: Participant Media; Actual Films
- Distributed by: Paramount Pictures
- Release dates: January 19, 2017 (Sundance Film Festival); July 28, 2017 (United States)
- Running time: 99 minutes
- Country: United States
- Language: English
- Budget: $1 million
- Box office: $5.4 million

An Inconvenient Sequel: Truth to Power is a 2017 American concert film/documentary film, directed by Bonni Cohen and Jon Shenk, about former United States Vice President Al Gore's continuing mission to battle climate change. The sequel to An Inconvenient Truth (2006), the film addresses the progress made to tackle the problem and Gore's global efforts to persuade governmental leaders to invest in renewable energy, culminating in the landmark signing of 2016's Paris Agreement. The film was released on July 28, 2017, by Paramount Pictures, and grossed over $5 million worldwide. It received a nomination for Best Documentary at the 71st British Academy Film Awards.

== Synopsis ==
The film follows the efforts made to tackle climate change and Al Gore's attempts to persuade governmental leaders to invest in renewable energy, culminating in the signing of the Paris Agreement in 2015, as well as attempting to de-bunk the de-bunkers of Gore, his film and global warming in general.

== Production ==
When asked during a Reddit "Ask Me Anything" in 2013 whether there were plans for a follow-up film, An Inconvenient Truth director Davis Guggenheim said, "I think about it a lot – I think we need one right now." In 2014, The Hollywood Reporter reported that the producers of the first film were in talks over a possible sequel. "We have had conversations," co-producer Lawrence Bender said. "We've met; we've discussed. If we are going to make a movie, we want it to have an impact." Co-producer Laurie David also believed a sequel was needed. "God, do we need one," David said. "Everything in that movie has come to pass. At the time we did the movie, there was Hurricane Katrina; now we have extreme weather events every other week. The update has to be incredible and shocking."

In December 2016, Al Gore announced that a follow-up to An Inconvenient Truth, An Inconvenient Sequel, would open at the 2017 Sundance Film Festival. The film was screened in the Climate section, a new division, for films featuring climate and the environment. The film was theatrically released by Paramount Pictures on July 28, 2017.

In June 2017, the filmmakers told TheWrap that following President Donald Trump's withdrawal from the Paris Agreement, they would re-edit the film to expand Trump's role as antagonist, before its release.

== Music ==
American band OneRepublic released the title song "Truth to Power" for the film on June 30, 2017. The soundtrack for the film was scored by Jeff Beal and released on August 4, 2017.

== Release ==
An Inconvenient Sequel: Truth to Power was released on July 28, 2017, by Paramount Pictures. It was home released on Digital HD on October 6, 2017, and on Blu-ray and DVD on October 24, 2017.

The documentary grossed $3.5 million in the United States, and $1.7 million in other territories, for a worldwide total of $5.2 million, against a production budget of $1 million.

== Critical response ==
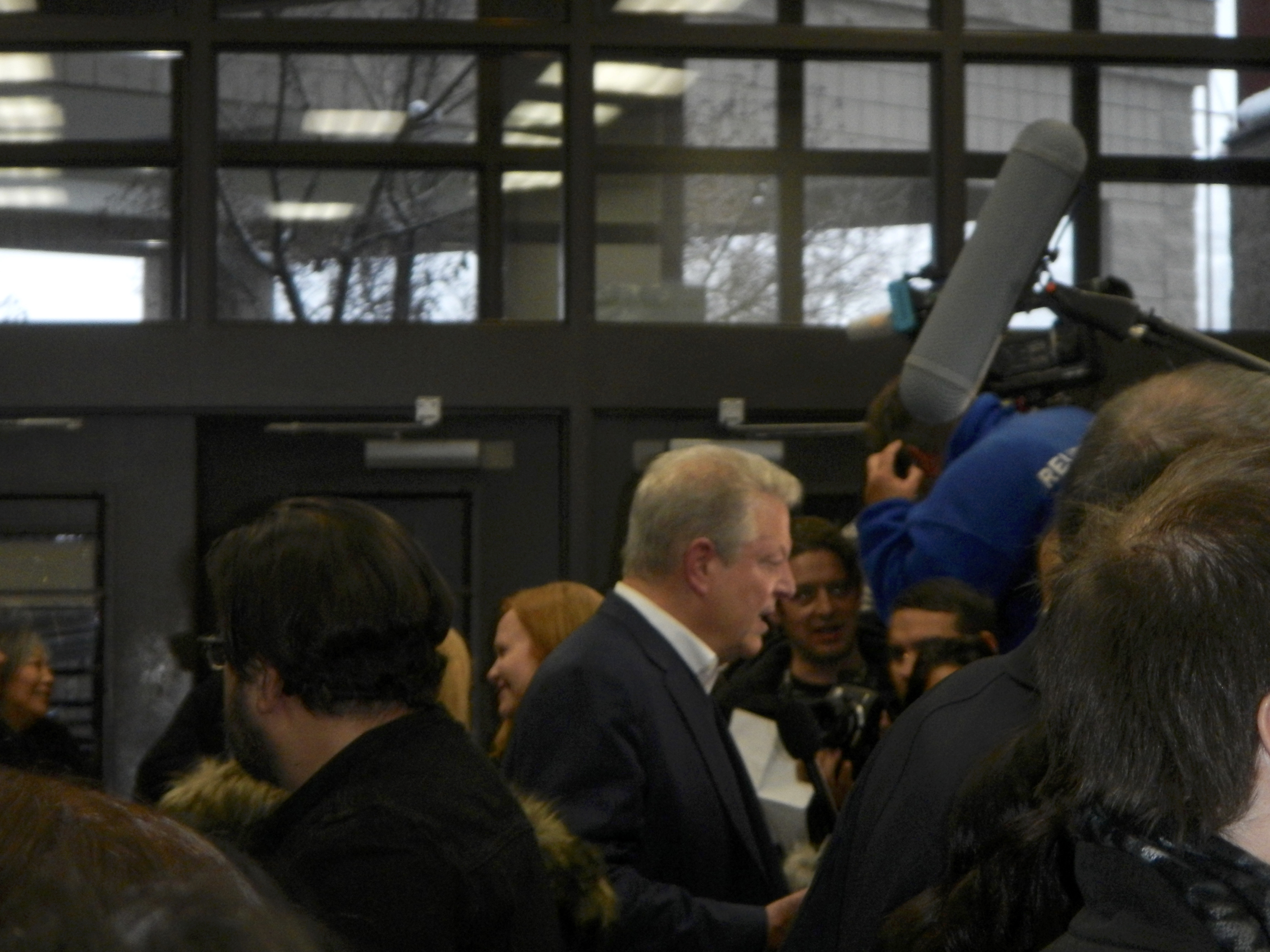
Al Gore backstage at the screening of the sequel at the Sundance Film Festival in 2017.

On review aggregation website Rotten Tomatoes, the film has an approval rating of 80%, based on 159 reviews, with an average rating of 6.5/10. The website's critical consensus reads: "An Inconvenient Sequel: Truth to Power makes a plea for environmental responsibility that adds a persuasive – albeit arguably less effective – coda to its acclaimed predecessor." On Metacritic, the film has a score of 68 out of 100, based on 36 critics, indicating "generally favorable" reviews.

John DeFore of The Hollywood Reporter gave the documentary a positive review, while writing that it is not as effective as the original, saying: "it finds plenty to add, both in cementing the urgency of Gore's message and in finding cause for hope". In Nature, Michael Mann wrote that "[Al Gore]'s up against arguably the most entrenched, wealthy and powerful industry the world has ever known: fossil fuels. [...] This sequel is deliciously inconvenient, and for several reasons. It is inconvenient to the vested interests who had hoped that Gore would just give up. [...] Knowing that Al Gore is still optimistic is a shot in the arm at a time of uncertainty."

Skeptical Inquirer editor Kendrick Frazier writes that Truth to Power spends little time explaining what climate change is, though there are some good summaries, but more time on the effects. Gore goes to a lot of trouble not to allow the movie to be a "downer" and shows what nations and U.S. states have done to fight climate change. Frazier states that a "skilled politician can get things done in ways that scientists can only imagine", and though he would have liked to have seen less Gore talking and more scientists on camera, Frazier writes that the movie is effective.

Conversely, conservative magazine National Review's film critic Kyle Smith called the film misleading, saying that it gave the false impression that recent storm activity (such as 2012's Hurricane Sandy) was more frequent than usual, falsely gave credit to both Gore and the company SolarCity for convincing India to sign the Paris Agreement, exaggerated the importance of the Paris Agreement, and neglected to mention Gore's financial ties to SolarCity. Writing for RogerEbert.com, Nick Allen also gave the film a negative review, specifying: "The documentary follow-up proves to be less about global warming than propping up a hero awkwardly desperate to captivate audiences again like he did eleven years ago. It's like the Zoolander 2 of global warming documentaries."
