= Lead Me Home =

2021 short documentary film by Pedro Kos and Jon Shenk

- Promotional poster
- Directed by: Pedro Kos; Jon Shenk
- Produced by: Richard Berge; Bonni Cohen; Serin Marshall
- Starring: Amaree McKenstry-Hall
- Cinematography: Jon Shenk
- Edited by: Don Bernier; Pedro Kos
- Music by: Gil Talmi
- Production company: Actual Films
- Distributed by: Netflix
- Release date: November 30, 2021
- Running time: 39 minutes
- Country: United States
- Language: English

Lead Me Home is a 2021 American short documentary film made for Netflix and directed by Pedro Kos and Jon Shenk. It was nominated for Best Documentary Short Subject at the 94th Academy Awards.

== Summary ==
The film follows several homeless people living on the streets of the West Coast of the United States.

== Release and reception ==
The film was released on November 30, 2021.

On review aggregator Rotten Tomatoes, the film holds a 100% approval rating based on 5 reviews.
