= Smile Pinki =

2008 American documentary film

- Directed by: Megan Mylan
- Produced by: Megan Mylan
- Cinematography: Nick Doob; Jon Shenk
- Edited by: Purcell Carson
- Music by: R. Prasanna
- Production company: Principe Productions
- Distributed by: Smile Train; HBO (TV)
- Release date: 2008
- Running time: 39 minutes
- Country: United States
- Language: Bhojpuri/Hindi

Smile Pinki is a 2008 American documentary film directed by Megan Mylan which won the 81st Academy Award for Best Documentary (Short Subject). The film depicts the story of Pinki and Ghutaru, two children in rural India who receive corrective surgery for cleft lips.

== Overview ==
Pinki had a unilateral complete cleft lip.

Pinki Sonkar is a five-year-old girl who is living with a severe cleft lip in one of the poorest areas of India. Not allowed to attend school at her native Rampur Dhabahi village in Mirzapur, near Varanasi, and ostracised because of her deformity, Pinki lives a life of quiet desperation. By chance, Pinki's parents meet Pankaj, a social worker who is traveling village to village, gathering patients for a hospital that provides free cleft lip surgery to thousands of poor children each year through The Smile Train program.

The successful surgery was performed at G.S. Memorial Hospital, by plastic surgeon Dr. Subodh Kumar Singh, who along with Pinki attended the 81st Academy Awards ceremony. In India the film generated national attention with a theatrical, media and community screening campaign to build public health awareness and support for clefts. The film was broadcast on HBO, Sundance Channel and Doordarshan and 8 million free DVDs were distributed. Pinki was invited to toss the coin for the men's singles final at the 2013 Wimbledon Championships, London.
