= Corita Kent =

American artist and designer

- Born: Frances Elizabeth Kent; November 20, 1918; Fort Dodge, Iowa, US
- Died: September 18, 1986 (aged 67); Boston, Massachusetts, US
- Known for: Silkscreen, serigraphy
- Movement: Pop art
- Website: corita.org

Corita Kent (November 20, 1918 – September 18, 1986), born Frances Elizabeth Kent and also known as Sister Mary Corita Kent, was an American artist, designer and educator, and former religious sister. Key themes in her work include Christianity and social justice. She was an art instructor at Immaculate Heart College.

She was born Frances Elizabeth Kent on November 20 1918. At 18, Kent entered the Sisters of the Immaculate Heart, known as a progressive order that welcomed creativity. Kent joined a teaching order, taking the name Sister Mary Corita. She received a bachelor's degree at Immaculate Heart College and a master's degree at University of Southern California. She became an art professor and the head of the art department at Immaculate Heart College where she taught a wide variety of different artistic methods. Her work focused on activism, spiritual expression, and love for God.

Kent's primary medium was screen printing, also known as serigraphy. She was self-taught after sending away for a silk screening kit. Her innovative methods pushed back the limitations of two-dimensional media of the times. Kent's emphasis on printing was partially due to her wish for democratic outreach, as she wished for affordable art for the masses. Her artwork, with its messages of love and peace, was particularly popular during the social upheavals of the 1960s and 1970s.

Due to opposition from Cardinal James McIntyre (who had a particular dislike for Kent), the sisters were forced out of their schools in Los Angeles—with the exception of the college—and most of the sisters left the order entirely, while keeping the larger school. Kent, however, moved to the East Coast and begin to work independently.

After a cancer diagnosis in the early 1970s, she entered an extremely prolific period in her career, including the Rainbow Swash design on the LNG storage tank in Boston, and the 1985 version of the United States Postal Service's special Love stamp.

In the last decades, Kent has gained increased recognition for her role in the Pop Art movement. As both a nun and a woman making art in the 20th century, she was in many ways discounted from mainstream artistic culture and its critical dialogues.

Kent's art was her activism, and her spiritually-informed social commentary promoted love and tolerance.

== Biography ==
=== Early life and education ===
Frances Elizabeth Kent, the fifth child of Robert Vincent and Edith Genevieve, was born in Fort Dodge, Iowa on November 20, 1918. Kent's parents were artistically inclined, especially her father, and always encouraged her art. In junior high, Kent and her siblings attended Blessed Sacrament School which was partially staffed by Sisters of the Immaculate Heart of Mary. When attending junior high, Kent's art potential was noticed by several nuns. Kent graduated from Los Angeles Catholic Girls' High School in 1936.

Upon entering the Roman Catholic order of IHM sisters in Los Angeles in 1936, Kent took the name Sister Mary Corita. She took classes at Otis (now Otis College of Art and Design) and Chouinard Art Institute, and received a BA degree from Immaculate Heart College in 1941. She received a MA degree at the University of Southern California (USC) in Art History in 1951. Kent recalled in an oral history interview with UCLA that she learned serigraphy during this time from Maria Sodi de Ramos Martínez, the widow of Mexican muralist Alfredo Ramos Martínez.

=== Career ===
Between 1938 and 1968 Kent lived and worked in the Immaculate Heart Community. In 1947, she became a professor of art at Immaculate Heart College and was named the chair of its art department in 1964. Her classes at Immaculate Heart were an avant-garde mecca for prominent, ground-breaking artists and inventors, such as Alfred Hitchcock, John Cage, Saul Bass, Buckminster Fuller and Charles & Ray Eames. Kent credited Charles Eames, Buckminster Fuller, and art historian Dr. Alois Schardt for their important roles in her intellectual and artistic growth. By the early 1950s, Kent had a unique and well-known aesthetic and teaching style that clergy members from all over the country were sent to be educated at Immaculate Heart College. Her students were drawn to her selflessness and teaching methods such as large class assignments like asking students to create 200 drawings or take three hours to draw their arm without looking at what they were creating.

Kent toured widely the following decade. After the Second Vatican Council, Kent transformed Immaculate Heart College's annual Mary's Day procession into a community celebration which was part of the sister's campaign to bring secular people together. During this time, Kent's work became increasingly political, addressing events such as the Vietnam War and humanitarian crises. For example, she was commissioned by the Physicians for Social Responsibility to create what she called "we can create life without war" billboards. Tensions between the order and church leadership were mounting, with the Los Angeles archdiocese criticizing the college as "liberal" and Cardinal James McIntyre labeling the college as "communist" and Kent's work as "blasphemous." Due to this, Kent returned to secular life in 1968 as Corita Kent. Most sisters followed suit and the Immaculate Heart College closed in 1980. Kent also embraced the many different revolutionary movements going on in the world at this time. These movements included the anti-Vietnam War movement, Civil Rights, and Women's Rights.

Kent created several hundred serigraph designs, for posters, book covers, and murals. Her work includes the 1985 United States Postal Service stamp Love and the 1971 Rainbow Swash, the largest copyrighted work of art in the world, covering a 150-foot (46 m) high natural gas tank in Boston. She did not attend the unveiling of the Love stamp because she wanted it to happen at the United Nations and was not happy with the message that was sent when the design was unveiled on the Love Boat. Her 1985 work "love is hard work" was made in response. The stamp itself sold successfully—over 700 million times. Kent was also commissioned to create work for the 1964 World's Fair in New York, and the 1965 IBM Christmas display in New York. Her 1951 print, The Lord is with Thee had won first prizes in printmaking at the Los Angeles County Museum of History, Science, Art, and at the California State Fair.

Kent's work has been exhibited extensively beginning in 1952. By the 1960s, Kent had already shown work at 230 exhibitions across the country and her work was included in the collections the Achenbach Foundation Graphic Arts, the Fogg museum, the Los Angeles County Museum of Art, the Metropolitan Museum of Art, the Museum of Modern Art, the National Gallery of Art, the National Serigraph Society, the Norman Rockwell Museum, the San Francisco Museum of Modern Art, the Smithsonian Institution, and the Whitney Museum of American Art.

=== Death ===
Kent was diagnosed with ovarian cancer in 1974. After this diagnosis, in the Back Bay of Boston, Kent confined her art to water color painting and only pursued printmaking in order to say something substantive. The Papers of Corita revealed Kent had kept two calendars towards the end of her life. This displayed that Kent, in the midst of fighting cancer, followed a strict diet, answered and wrote letters, and wanted to live and continue to create art.

She died on September 18, 1986, in Watertown Massachusetts at the age of sixty-seven. She left her copyrights and unsold works to the Immaculate Heart Community formed by the former IHM sisters in Los Angeles.

== Artistic style ==
Kent worked at the intersection of several powerful—and at times contradictory—cultural, political, and religious influences. Kent, inspired by the works of Andy Warhol, began using popular culture as raw material for her work in 1962. Her screen prints often incorporated archetypical product brands of American consumerism alongside spiritual texts. Her design process involved appropriating an original advertising graphic to suit her idea; for example, she would tear, rip, or crumple the image, then re-photograph it. She often used grocery store signage, texts from scripture, newspaper clippings, song lyrics, and writings from literary greats such as Gertrude Stein, E. E. Cummings, and Albert Camus as the textual focal point of her work.

E. E. Cummings was one of Kent's earliest and strongest influences. She quotes him in her work separately more than a dozen times and was inspired by a line from one of his lectures to create an entire series of alphabet prints. In her 1966 work, Tame It's Not, she incorporated quotes from Winnie the Pooh, Kierkegaard, and an ad slogan for men's cologne. Using everyday consumer items, like Wonderbread, she was able to bring words and thoughts about her religion to a familiar product that people saw and used every day. By creating juxtaposition between formally acknowledged or respected "art" and the art Kent saw in her everyday world—at the supermarket, on a walk, in the classroom—she elevated the banal to the holy. "Like a priest, a shaman, a magician, she could pass her hands over the commonest of the everyday, the superficial, the oh-so-ordinary, and make it a vehicle of the luminous, the only, and the hope filled," noted Kent's friend, theologian Harvey Cox.

Kent's earliest work was mostly iconographic, drawing inspiration and material from the Bible and other religious sources. Her style is heavily text-based, with scripture passages or positive quotes often encompassing entire compositions with bold and highly saturated typefaces. Despite the often surreal or disorienting compositions of her works, her pieces are "always about something." By the 1960s, her work started becoming increasingly political.

Kent produced her oeuvre during her time at Immaculate Heart College in Los Angeles in response to the Catholic reform in the 1960s by the Vatican Council II as well as several political and social issues happening at the time. Her work itself aided in the Vatican II movement, a movement to modernize and make relevant the Catholic Church. Kent's use of English church texts in her work, for example, made an impact on the Vatican II's efforts to normalize conducting Mass in English. Because of the overtly political nature of her work, she and others left their order to create the Immaculate Heart Community in 1970 to avoid problems with their archdiocese.

The "Big G" logo that Kent appropriated from General Mills was to stress the idea of 'goodness', while the elements from Esso gasoline ads were meant to project the internal power within humans. Unsurprisingly, a Christian subtext does underscore several of her artworks, but not all, which are open to interpretation.

One of Kent's prints, love your brother (1969), depicts photographs of Martin Luther King Jr. overlaid with her handwritten words, "The king is dead. Love your brother". Her collages used popular images, often with twisted or reversed words, to comment on the political unrest of the period, many of which could have been found at any number of marches or demonstrations, some of which she attended herself.

== Legacy ==
Kent had solo exhibitions at the National Museum of Women in the Arts (R(ad)ical Love: Sister Mary Corita, 2012) and her work is in several art museums, including the Whitney Museum of American Art, the Museum of Fine Arts, Boston and The Metropolitan Museum of Art. An archive is dedicated to her at the Immaculate Heart Community Headquarters in Hollywood, CA. Some of Kent's papers and early works are in Schlesinger Library in the Radcliffe Institute, Harvard University. Recent solo exhibitions of Kent's work include Someday is Now: The Art of Corita Kent at the Tang Museum at Skidmore College and There Will Be New Rules Next Week at Dundee Contemporary Arts.

The Corita Art Center (CAC), a gallery and archive dedicated to preserving and promoting the work and spirit of Corita Kent, was originally founded as the Corita Prints in 1969 in North Hollywood. It changed its name when it moved to the Immaculate Heart property in 1997 and is located within the offices of the Immaculate Heart Community Headquarters in Hollywood, CA. In September, 2024, the CAC announced that it would move to a new location in the Arts District of Los Angeles in 2025. The Corita Art Center opened in the Los Angeles Arts District on March 8, 2025.

Kent received the American Institute of Graphic Arts Medal in 2016.

Kent was one of the nuns featured in Rebel Hearts, a 2021 American documentary directed, produced, and edited by Pedro Kos. It had its world premiere at the 2021 Sundance Film Festival on January 29, 2021. It received a limited release on June 25, 2021, before digital streaming on Discovery+ starting June 27, 2021.

In 2023. the Catticus Corporation was granted $700,000 by the National Endowment for the Humanities to produce a documentary, titled "You Should Never Blink", about the rebellious life of the “pop art nun” Corita Kent.

== Exhibitions ==
=== Solo exhibitions ===
- 1975, Corita Kent Retrospective, at Syntex Art Gallery at Stanford Research Park, 3401 Hillview, Palo Alto, California
- 2012, R(ad)ical Love: Sister Mary Corita, National Museum of Women in the Arts, Washington, D.C.

== Awards and recognition ==
- 1966 Woman of the year LA Times
- 1967 on the cover of Newsweek
- 2016 American Institute of Graphic Arts Medal

== Partial list of publications ==
- 1967 Footnotes and Headlines: A Play-Pray Book, Sister Corita
- 1968 To Believe in God, poem by Joseph Pintauro, color by Sister Corita
- 1969 city, uncity, poems by Gerald Huckaby, pages by Corita Kent
- 1970 Damn Everything but the Circus, Corita Kent
- 1990 Primary Colors: The Story of Corita, Jeffrey Hayden
- 1992 Learning By Heart: Teachings to Free the Creative Spirit, Corita Kent (posthumously) and Jan Steward
- 2000 "Life Stories of Artist Corita Kent (1918–1986): Her Spirit, Her Art, the Woman Within" (Unpublished doctoral dissertation, Gonzaga University), Barbara Loste
- 2000 Eye, No. 35, Vol. 9, edited by John L. Walters, Quantum Publishing
- 2006 Come Alive! The Spirited Art of Sister Corita, Julie Ault

== Stage plays ==
- 2023, Little Heart - The Story of Corita Kent, by Irene O'Garden
