= Simple as Water =

2021 American documentary by Megan Mylan

- Poster
- Directed by: Megan Mylan
- Produced by: Robin Hessman, Megan Mylan
- Starring: Yasmin Al-Kadad; Samr Abo Ghanooj; Omar & Abdulrahman Sabha; Diaa; Safwan Al Kadad
- Cinematography: Lars Skree, Michael Chin, Rafia Salameh
- Edited by: Megan Mylan, Purcell Carson
- Music by: Hanan Townshend
- Production companies: Principe Productions; In Association with: Inmaat Productions, Just Films/Ford Foundation
- Distributed by: HBO
- Release date: 2021
- Running time: 97 minutes
- Country: United States
- Languages: Arabic, English, German

Simple as Water is a 2021 American documentary film by Oscar-winning director Megan Mylan. The film documents Syrian families across five countries, revealing the impact of war, separation, and displacement. The film is a meditation on the elemental bonds of family told through portraits of four Syrian families in the aftermath of war. Simple as Water premiered at the Tribeca Film Festival on June 20, 2021. It was released on November 16, 2021, on HBO Max.

== Synopsis ==
The film follows Yasmin, a mother of four living in a tent in the port of Athens; Samra, a widow on the Turkey-Syria border grappling with the decision to leave her children in an orphanage in hopes of giving them a better life; 22-year-old Omar, who has taken on the role of a parent for his younger brother Abed in Pennsylvania; Diaa, who has remained in Syria while tirelessly searching for her "disappeared" son; and Safwan, Yasmin's husband, who lives in temporary housing in Germany and yearns to be reunited with his children.

== Critical reception ==
Simple as Water was released to high critical acclaim. Claire Shaffer of The New York Times chose Simple as Water as an NYT Critics Pick, writing that "Megan Mylan's latest documentary feature takes a humble idea — telling intimate and humanizing stories of Syrian families affected by their home country's civil war — and achieves it on a nakedly ambitious scale. Filmed over five years in five separate countries, Simple as Water is anything but simple when it comes to its technical achievements, weaving together familiar immigrant narratives in ways that still manage to surprise and stun."

Michael Rechtshaffen of the Los Angeles Times wrote that "the daily existence of a quartet of displaced Syrian families, forced apart by the ravages of war, is tenderly profiled in Megan Mylan's Simple as Water, an achingly poignant testament to the unwavering strength of parental and filial bonds."

Ahead of the film's Tribeca premiere, Luke Moody, former head programmer of Britain's largest documentary film festival, wrote that "Simple as Water is a soft-spoken meditation on love, displacement, and fracturing familial relations... Mylan's cinematic lens finds the powerful yet everyday acts of nurturing and kinship, traveling with her protagonists as they build a new sense of belonging. From brotherly protection, motherly love, and the playful guidance of a sibling, these closely observed scenes show touching stories of resilience and reveal ties that bind families together in the face of adversity."

Ryan Lattanzio of IndieWire wrote that "Simple unfolds more like a riveting neorealist drama, with no trace of the woman and her crew behind the camera, no talking heads, no filmmakerly intervention of any kind... From the looks of the film, you wouldn't seem wrong to think that Mylan simply observed her subjects. Instead, she visibly had a level of deep, intimate access and rapport that few filmmakers can hope to achieve."

Matthew Delman of Hammer To Nail wrote that "The poetic lyricism of Mylan's film is what makes it stand out ... Despite the heartrending storylines, there are also go-karts and balloons, and plenty of smiles and kisses. It's a stunning achievement to make a film about the Syrian refugee crisis so beautiful and endlessly watchable."

As of December 22, 2021, Simple as Water was rated at 100% on Rotten Tomatoes.

== Awards and film festivals ==
=== Awards ===
On December 21, 2021, it was announced that Simple as Water was one of fifteen films to advance in the Documentary Feature category for the 94th Academy Awards, out of one hundred thirty-eight eligible films. Ultimately, it was not nominated.

Simple as Water has been nominated for the Producers Guild of America Award for Best Documentary Film.

Simple as Water was nominated for a Peabody Award in 2021.

Editors Megan Mylan and Purcell Carson have been nominated for the International Documentary Association's Award for Best Editing.

Simple as Water is an NYT Critic's Pick.

=== Film festivals ===
Simple as Water was selected for the Tribeca Film Festival, Montclair Film, and SFFilm Doc Stories, among others.
