= Dragfox =

2024 British animated short film directed and animated by Lisa Ott

- Directed by: Lisa Ott
- Screenplay by: John Cooney
- Produced by: Owen Thomas
- Starring: Aidan Gale; Ian McKellen; Divina de Campo
- Cinematography: Rufai Ajala
- Edited by: Mariana Moraes
- Music by: Charli Mackie
- Production company: National Film and Television School
- Release date: 31 August 2024 (Telluride)
- Running time: 8 minutes
- Country: United Kingdom
- Language: English

Dragfox is a British animated short film, directed by Lisa Ott and released in 2024. The film centres on Sam (Aidan Gale), a child struggling with their identity, who meets and is guided on their journey by Gingersnap (Ian McKellen), a talking fox.

It premiered in the Student Prints program at the 51st Telluride Film Festival, and had its British premiere at the 2024 BFI London Film Festival.

== Production ==
The film was made as Ott's masters project for the National Film and Television School. Gingersnap performs a song in the film, sung by Divina de Campo with backing by the London Gay Big Band.

== Awards ==
Award	Date	Category	Recipient	Result	Ref.
BAFTA Student Film Awards	2024	Animation	Dragfox	Nominated	
BAFTA Student Film Awards	2024	Special Jury Prize	Dragfox	Won	
BFI London Film Festival	2024	Best Short Film	Dragfox	Honoured	
Cinanima	2024	International Competition, Student Films	Dragfox	Honoured	
Denver Film Festival	2024	Special Mention, Social Impact	Dragfox	Honoured	
Student Academy Awards	2024	Animation	Dragfox	Nominated	
