= The Island President =

- Film poster
- Directed by: Jon Shenk
- Produced by: Richard Berge; Bonni Cohen
- Starring: Mohamed Nasheed
- Cinematography: Jon Shenk
- Edited by: Pedro Kos
- Music by: Radiohead; Marco D'Ambrosio
- Production company: Actual Films
- Distributed by: Samuel Goldwyn Films
- Release date: 1 September 2011 (TFF)
- Running time: 101 minutes
- Country: United States
- Languages: English; Maldivian

The Island President is a 2011 documentary film about the efforts of then-President of the Maldives Mohamed Nasheed to tackle rising sea levels resulting from climate change. Produced by Actual Films and directed by Jon Shenk, the film premiered at the Telluride Film Festival. The film received critical acclaim and won the Toronto International Film Festival People's Choice Award for Documentaries.

The government of the Maldives has predicted it would be inundated as a result of global warming since 1988, when its forecast was "completely cover this Indian Ocean nation of 1196 small islands with in the next 30 years".

== Production and release ==
The film was funded by groups including the Ford Foundation, the American Corporation for Public Broadcasting, the John D. and Catherine T. MacArthur Foundation, the Atlantic Philanthropies and the Sundance Institute.

At the 2011 Toronto International Film Festival, The Island President won the Cadillac People's Choice Documentary Award.

US rights to The Island President were acquired by Samuel Goldwyn Films. The film opened in New York City on March 28, 2012, followed by releases in other US cities, like Los Angeles and San Francisco.

== Reception ==
The Island President received positive reviews from critics. On the review aggregator website Rotten Tomatoes, 98% of 49 critics' reviews are positive. The website's consensus reads: "An eye-opening and appealing documentary about an earnest politician up against the closed door drama of climate change." Metacritic, which uses a weighted average, assigned the film a score of 72 out of 100, based on 14 critics, indicating "generally favorable" reviews.

A. O. Scott of The New York Times described the film as "buoyant and spirited" despite a grim postscript, praising its "spectacular aerial and underwater footage of the Maldives' beauty" and stating that "It is impossible, while watching it, to root against Mr. Nasheed or to believe that he will fail". Noel Murray of The A.V. Club gave the film a "B−", praising "the energy and conclusiveness" of its opening sections, but writing that "the movie stalls a bit" during the sections of international diplomacy.

After Nasheed stepped down as president in February 2012, Shenk said that he hoped his film could help convince the world that Nasheed was deposed in a coup that was orchestrated by loyalists to the former dictator, Maumoon Abdul Gayoom. "That might be the single most important thing that the movie can do. It's now clear that this new government is not democratic, that the people who run the ministries are the same people who were there under the dictator."

== See also ==
- Climate change in the Maldives
