= Charlotte McDonald-Gibson =

British journalist, editor, and author

Charlotte McDonald-Gibson is a British journalist, editor, and author. Her first book Cast Away was published in 2016, her second book Far Out was published in 2022.

== Career ==
McDonald-Gibson is a journalist whose career has included five years of work reporting on the European migrant crisis. She has worked an editor for Time Magazine and has been a finalist for the Helen Bernstein Book Award for Excellence in Journalism. She has also written for The New York Times and Monocle magazine.

== Publications ==
McDonald-Gibson is the author of the 2016 non-fiction book Cast Away, that retells the story of five refugee's escape to Europe. The book was described by Princess Haya bint Hussein as "honest and heartfelt".

She is also the author of the 2022 non fiction book Far Out: Encounters with Extremists, published by Granta Books.

== Personal life ==
In 2017, she was based in Brussels and later in The Hague. In the summer of 2023, she and her family moved to Washington DC, from where she works as a freelance correspondent for The New World and other publications.
