= Lost Boys of Sudan (film) =

- Directed by: Megan Mylan, Jon Shenk
- Produced by: Megan Mylan, Jon Shenk
- Cinematography: Jon Shenk
- Edited by: Mark Becker; Kim Roberts
- Release date: 2003
- Running time: 87 min.
- Language: English

Lost Boys of Sudan is a documentary film by Megan Mylan and Jon Shenk about two Dinka boys from Sudan, Santino Majok Chuor and Peter Nyarol Dut, who reached the United States after fleeing the civil war in their country. "Orphaned as young boys" in the Second Sudanese Civil War they "survived lion attacks and militia gunfire to reach a refugee camp in Kenya along with thousands of other children."

The documentary's title “Lost Boys of Sudan” was originally the name given to the group of Southern Sudanese youth by United Nations aid workers who were monitoring their flight from Sudan.

== Plot ==
A family in Sudan become refugees.

== Reception ==
On review aggregator website Rotten Tomatoes, the film holds an approval rating of 98% based on 42 reviews, with an average rating of 7.7/10.

== See also ==
- Lost Boys of Sudan
- Forced displacement in popular culture
- The Good Lie
