= Tokamak Physics Experiment =

Former American plasma physics experiment

TPX
Tokamak Physics Experiment
- Device type: Tokamak
- Location: United States
- Affiliation: Princeton Plasma Physics Laboratory and others

Technical specifications
- Major radius: 2.25 m (7 ft 5 in)
- Minor radius: 0.5 m (1 ft 8 in)
- Magnetic field: 4.0 T (40,000 G)
- Heating power: 17.5 MW
- Plasma current: 2.0 MA

History
- Date(s) of construction: Not built
- Year(s) of operation: Not built–Not built
- Succeeded by: KSTAR

The Tokamak Physics Experiment (TPX) was a plasma physics experiment that was designed but not built. It was designed by an inter-organizational team in the USA led by Princeton Plasma Physics Laboratory. The experiment was designed to test theories about how Tokamaks would behave in a high-performance, steady-state regime.

== Goals ==
TPX was to be the successor to the Tokamak Fusion Test Reactor (TFTR). While TFTR was designed to achieve Q>1 (more fusion power produced by the plasma than injected into the plasma), TFTR only operated for short pulses, and did not provide data from and experience with plasmas behave like those of an economic Fusion power reactor. Specifically, TPX was designed to fill this need.

TPX was designed to test theories which suggested ways of making a future fusion power reactor compact, economic, and reliable. Specifically, TPX was designed to be near steady state, with pulse lengths of 1,000 seconds (more than 15 minutes). It was designed to operate at high Bootstrap current, meaning that less power would have to be expended driving toroidal current. It was designed to operate at high values of Beta, meaning that it would be able to store more plasma pressure for a given magnetic field. It was designed to operate with a high level of confinement, meaning that less auxiliary heating would be required.

== History ==
After the cancellation of the Compact Ignition Tokamak in 1991, the United States Department of Energy directed the US fusion program to find ways to improve the tokamak. In 1993, a conceptual design review was held for TPX in 1993, finalizing the conceptual design. The design team was managed by Princeton Plasma Physics Laboratory and included members from other US institutions. The program was canceled in 1995, as the proposed cost was too high. The proposed cost was $539 Million in 1993 dollars.

== Legacy ==
The KSTAR tokamak built South Korea is based on the TPX design. KSTAR uses Hydrogen, not Deuterium as TPX was designed to, so neutron activation of components is not as large a problem. Because of this, the titanium vacuum vessel of the TPX design was replaced with a stainless steel vessel in KSTAR, and the remote maintenance system was removed from the design.

== Description ==
Because TPX was designed to be steady-state (or at least long-pulse, with 1,000 seconds duration), the electromagnetic coils which provide the magnetic field were to be superconducting. They were to be made of Niobium–tin superconducting cables. The toroidal magnetic field strength at the center of the plasma was to be 4.0 tesla.

TPX was designed to have its toroidal electric current be 100% non-inductively driven. Because of this, it was to have three current drive systems: An 8 MW neutral beam injector system, an 8 MW ion cyclotron resonance system, and a 1.5 MW lower hybrid wave system. The toroidal current carried by the plasma was to be up to 2.0 MA.

Because TPX was designed to test at least six different high-performance scenarios, its poloidal field coils and current drive systems were designed for flexibility. Some examples of possible scenarios are: one inspired by the ARIES-I reactor design which had an aggressive Beta, one inspired by the Tokamak Fusion Test Reactor Supershot regime, and one with a profile which produced an internal transport barrier for enhanced confinement.
