= Escape From Manus =

2021 autobiography by Javiet Ealom

Escape from Manus
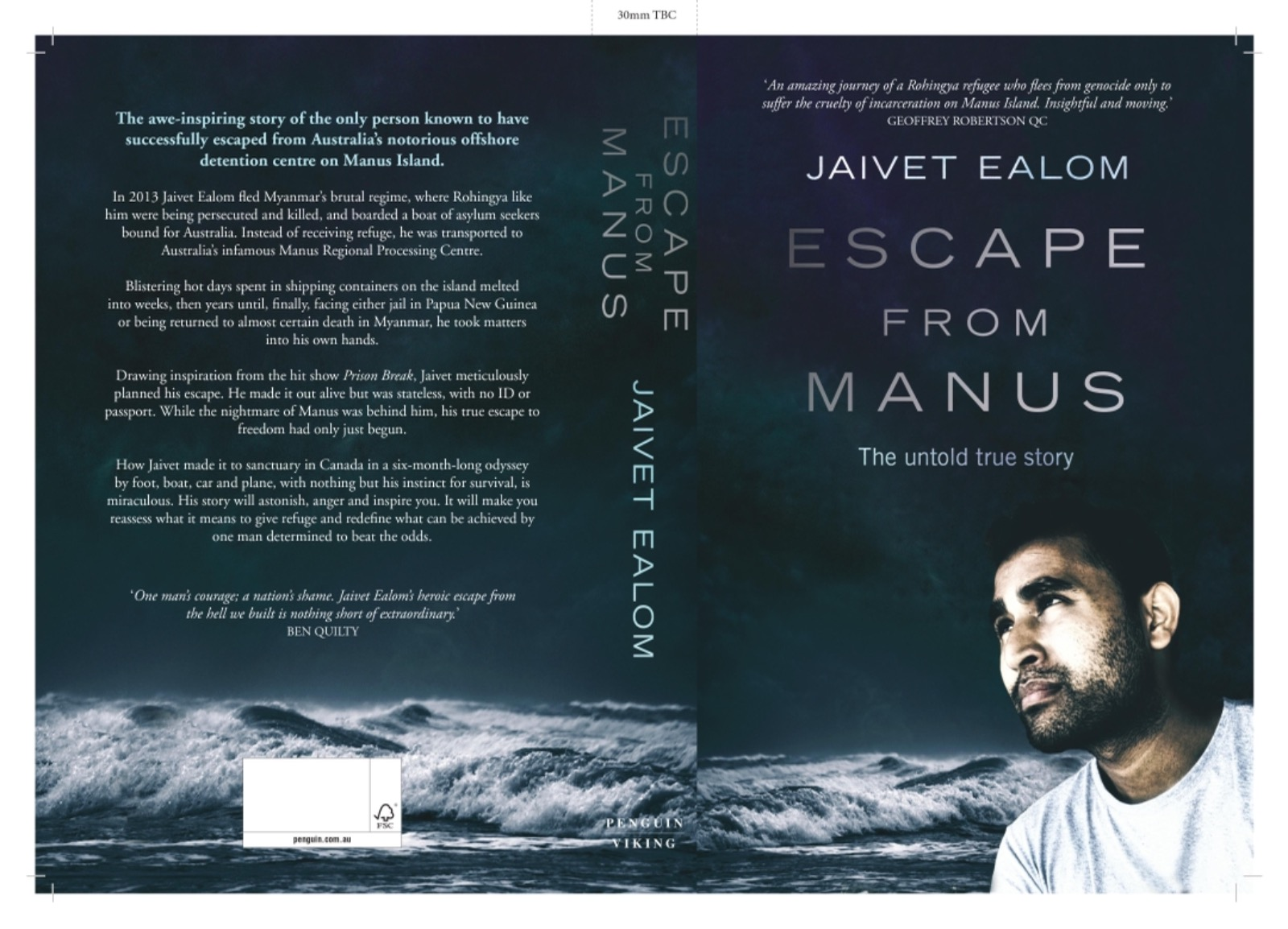
- Author: Jaivet Ealom
- Language: English
- Subjects: Rohingya genocide Asylum in Australia; Immigration detention in Australia; Manus Regional Processing Centre
- Genre: Autobiography
- Publisher: Penguin Books
- Publication date: 2 July 2021
- Publication place: Australia
- Pages: 352
- ISBN: 9780735245198

Escape From Manus is an autobiographical memoir by Rohingya refugee Jaivet Ealom documenting his escape from the genocide in Myanmar, his journey to Indonesia, his arrest upon arrival in Australia, and detention in the Australian offshore detention centres on Manus Island, Papua New Guinea. While in detention Ealom suffers prison-like conditions, is the victim of a violent attack, attempts suicide, and goes on hunger strike. After three and a half years of detention is becomes the only person to escape Manus Island. After his escape he travels to the Solomon Islands and finally Canada.

The book received a positive reception in Australian and Papua New Guinean press.

== Plot summary ==
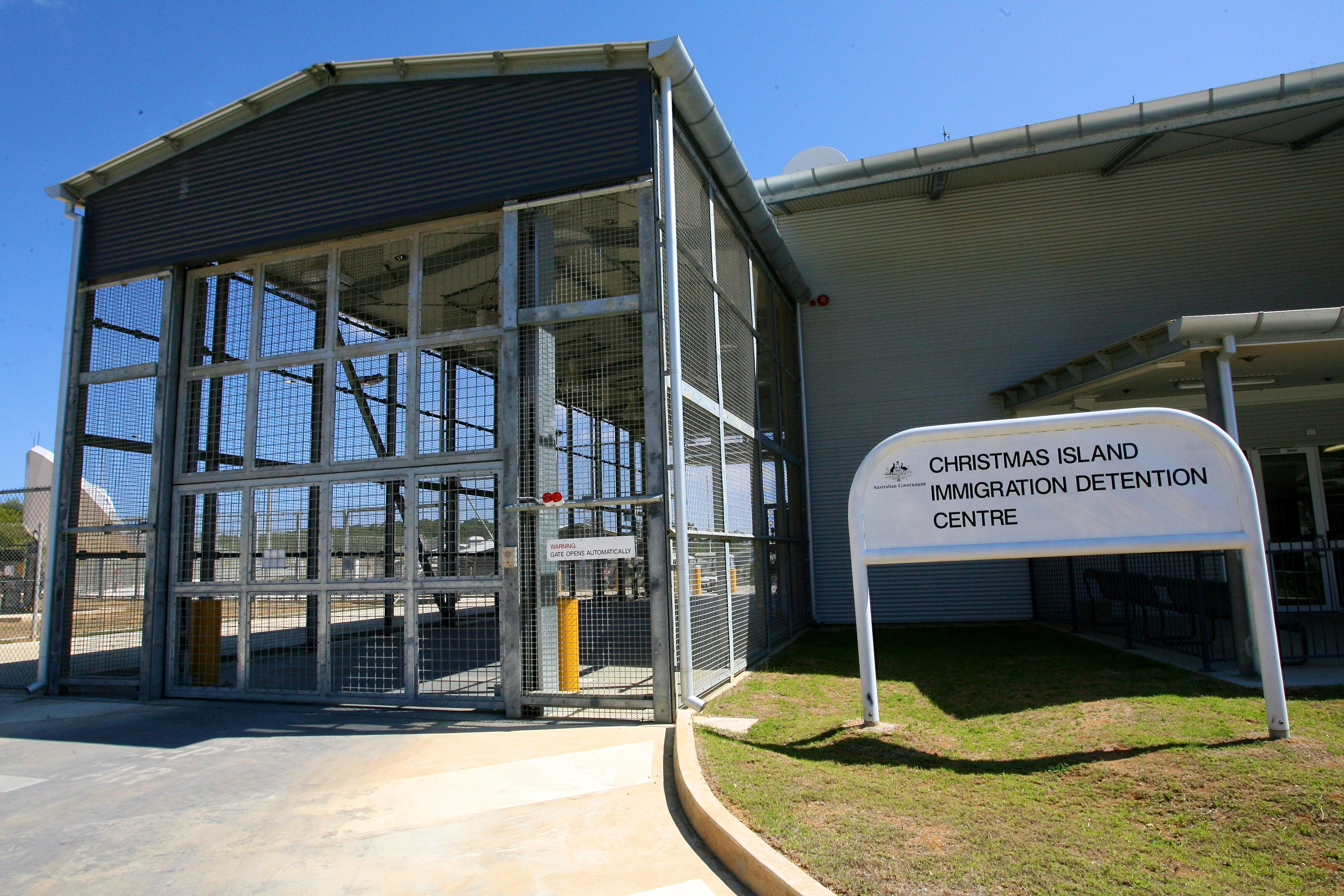
Christmas Island Detention Centre

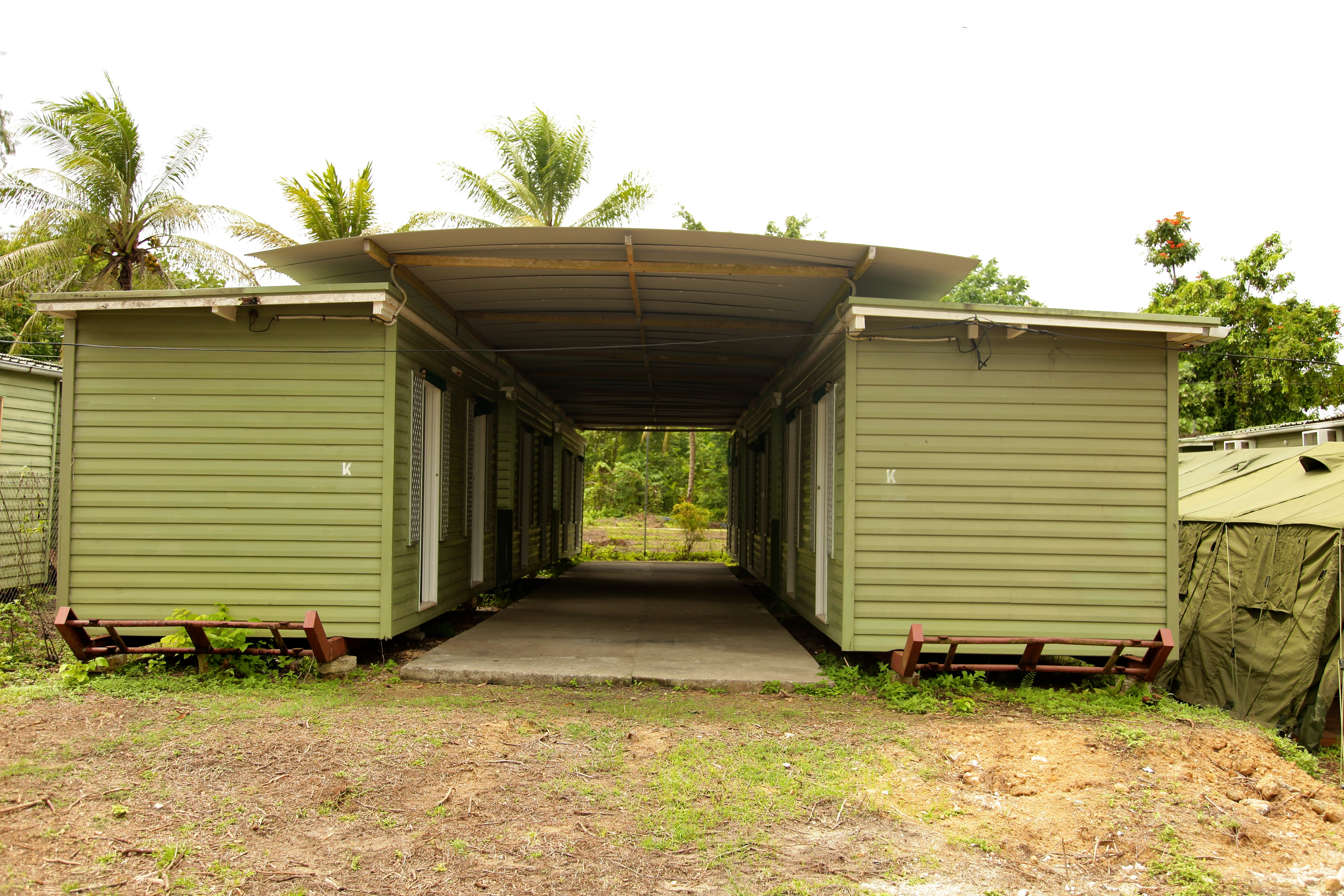
Manus island detention centre, 2012

Ealom is a Rohingya refugee whose story starts with his 2013 escape from the genocide in Myanmar. He travels by boat to Jakarta, Indonesia but nearly drowns during the journey and is rescued by a fisherman. From Indonesia, he starts a journey to Australia, planning to seek asylum upon arrival. During his boat journey, Australian Prime Minister Kevin Rudd makes the policy change that Australia would not accept refugees arriving by boat. Upon arrival in Australia he is arrested by Australian authorities and put in detention, initially in Christmas Island detention centre. Ealom is assigned a number and which is put on a permanent wristband. After six months, at the age of 21, he is moved to Manus Island detention centre. The conditions in the detention center were prison-like, toilets are overflowing with raw sewage, the food is rotten, Ealom is housed in an unbearably hot shipping container. Ealom is subjected to psychological torture.

In May 2017, after three and a half years of detention, a suicide attempt, a hunger strike, and serious injuries from an attack, Ealom orchestrates his escape. Posing as an interpreter he escapes the detention center with some aid from detention center staff. Once outside, he purchases and boards a flight to Port Moresby, Papua New Guinea.

In Papua New Guinea he learns Tok Pisin, pretends to be a Solomon Islander and obtains a Solomon Island passport. He flies to Solomon Islands and then, benefiting from the travel rules between Commonwealth countries, buys a flight to Toronto, Canada.

The book contains criticism of United Nations High Commissioner for Refugees, the Australian Government's refugee policies, and addresses common myths about refugees and migrants.

== Reception ==
In March 2020, Escape From Manus was described as "incredible" in The National.

It was described as a "compelling refugee's tale" and "an amazing escape story" in the Sydney Morning Herald in 2021.

Chris Breen, writing in Australian magazine Solidarity, notes the books clear critique of Australia's refugee policy and predicts that it will be made into a film.

== See also ==
- Jaivet Ealom
- Asylum in Australia
