= In Waves and War =

2024 documentary film

- Directed by: Bonni Cohen; Jon Shenk
- Produced by: Jessica Anthony; Bonni Cohen; Jon Shenk; Quinn C. Ford
- Cinematography: Jon Shenk
- Edited by: Don Bernier
- Music by: Bryce Dessner
- Animation by: Studio AKA, Marcus Armitage
- Layouts by: Sara Diaz, Jerome Ferra
- Production companies: Actual Films, Chicago Media Project, Participant Media
- Release dates: August 31, 2024 (Telluride Film Festival); November 3, 2025 (Netflix)
- Running time: 107 minutes
- Country: United States
- Language: English

In Waves and War is a 2024 documentary film created and directed by Bonni Cohen and Jon Shenk. The film premiered at the Telluride Film Festival on August 31, 2024, and was released on Netflix on November 3, 2025.

The film centers on decorated Navy SEAL Marcus Capone, and his wife Amber, as they deal with Capone's severe PTSD and depression after returning from service in Afghanistan. The story follows Capone and fellow veterans Matty Roberts and DJ Shipley, as they progress through the intensity of SEAL training, multiple combat tours, and the struggle of integrating back to civilian life. Her husband's deteriorating mental state, and the ineffectiveness of traditional treatments and medication, lead Amber Capone to search for alternative therapies, and finds hope in a treatment unapproved for use in the U.S. involving the psychedelics ibogaine and 5-MeO-DMT. Marcus and a number of other veterans, at first skeptical, undertake the treatment. The film highlights the high suicide rate and hidden wounds of returning combat veterans who have suffered traumatic brain injuries or other forms of PTSD, and the promise of psychedelics as therapies for healing.

The title is inspired by a quote from the Odyssey, given at the beginning of the film:

"By now I am used to suffering. I have endured so much in waves and war. Let this next adventure follow." - Odysseus

== Cast ==
- Marcus Capone, U.S. Navy SEAL
- DJ Shipley, U.S. Navy SEAL
- Matty Roberts, U.S. Navy SEAL
- Brian L. Losey, (retired) Admiral, U.S. Navy SEAL
- Amber Capone
- Patsy Dietz-Shipley
- Nolan R. Williams, MD, Director, Stanford Brain Stimulation Lab
- Jonathan Dickinson, Psychologist and Co-Founder of Ambio Life Sciences.

== Background ==
In 2024 and 2025, Stanford University Medicine, led by researcher Nolan Williams, MD published a "before" and "after" study of the effects of psychoactive compounds, specifically the alkaloid ibogaine, on 30 special operations veterans. The 30 men were United States Navy SEALs who had been in combat in Afghanistan, and had a history of traumatic brain injuries (TBI) from repeated blast exposures and post-traumatic stress disorder (PTSD). Almost all of them were also experiencing severe psychiatric symptoms, depression, and/or functional disabilities. The study noted that hundreds of thousands of troops who had served in Iraq and Afghanistan had sustained TBIs, and the injuries likely play a role in the high rate of suicide among veterans, of which there are nearly 20 per day in the United States. Few traditional treatments have been effective at alleviating long-term symptoms.

The Stanford studies teamed with the organization VETS (Veterans Exploring Treatment Solutions), a non-profit founded by Marcus and Amber Capone, which helps veterans access clinically-guided psychedelic therapies. The organization was founded in 2019 after Marcus Capone had had success with psychoactive compound therapy in a clinic, Ambio Life Sciences, in Mexico, led by psychologist Jonathan Dickinson.

Film director Jon Shenk stated that he became aware of the organization VETS some years after their founding, and he and fellow director Bonni Cohen realized a film about their work and collaboration with the Stanford study would be compelling.

== Premise ==
The film begins with introducing Marcus Capone, a highly decorated 13-year Navy SEAL combat veteran. The first half of the film details Capone's journey, along with fellow veterans Matty Roberts and DJ Shipley, as they enlist after the 9/11 attacks, undergo the difficult Navy SEAL training, and serve multiple tours in Afghanistan, experiencing physical injuries and emotional hardships. At the same time, interspersed through the story, are contemporary pre-study interviews with some of the 30 SEAL veterans who will be participating in the Stanford ibogaine study, and records the prevalence of serious mental health problems, suicidal thoughts, and depression among them.

As Capone requests and is granted a medical discharge, he continues to struggle with PTSD and depression. Despite high doses of traditional medication, his situation deteriorates, and his wife Amber eventually learns of a treatment program of psychedelics available at a clinic led by psychologist and ibogaine advocate Jonathan Dickinson. Because the compounds are Schedule 1 controlled substances and illegal to be dispensed in the U.S., the clinic is located in Tijuana, Mexico. Amber eventually convinces Marcus to travel to the clinic and undergo treatment.

The treatment consisted of taking two psychedelic compounds, ibogaine and 5-MeO-DMT. Ibogaine is a naturally occurring compound found in the root bark of a shrub native to Central and West Africa. 5-MeO-DMT is short for 5-methoxy-N,N-dimethyltryptamine, and is found in high concentrations in the secretion of the toad Bufo alvarius, found in the southwestern U.S. and northwestern Mexico. In an interview Capone described the ibogaine experience, which lasted six to eight hours and was monitored by clinicians and medical personnel, as "difficult".

The film combines traditional interviews with animation to illustrate the inner experiences and hallucinations of the veterans during their sessions. Reviewers of the movie praised the animation, created by London-based Studio AKA, as "stunning", "visceral", "gorgeous", and "amazing - you feel like you are in their brain". Director Jon Shenk said that in interviewing those who had had the treatment, the most common experience was a "life review", and that the animators were effective in capturing that. Capone said he thought the filmmakers "completely nailed it". The animation of battle sequences was also praised.

When Capone returned from the trip, his wife Amber said on seeing him, "Something's different - I haven't seen this for 20 years", immediately noticing a positive change. Capone replied, "This is exactly what the guys need. We have to figure out a way to pay this forward". Which then became the genesis of the VETS organization.

The film then follows fellow veterans Roberts and Shipley, as well as the other veterans from the Stanford study, in their experiences. Capone and Shipley accompany Roberts and other veterans to Mexico to undertake the therapy and the film portrays how the mind-altering experiences help them confront trauma buried deep inside. While the final results of the Stanford study were not published until after the completion of the film, the documentary anecdotally provides evidence of the promise of the therapy, in the form of decrease in PTSD symptoms. Stanford researcher Nolan Williams wrote, "No other drug has ever been able to alleviate the functional and neuropsychiatric symptoms of traumatic brain injury. The results are dramatic, and we intend to study this compound further."

== Reception ==
As of April 2026 the film had seven critics' reviews on Rotten Tomatoes. Jennifer Green of Common Sense Media gave it a 4 out of 5, writing, "This engrossing documentary raises questions about the military, the forever wars, our care for veterans, and experimental drug therapies." David Parkinson of Radio Times gave it 3 out of 5, writing, "A considered treatise on PTSD that makes inspired use of animation by the London-based Studio AKA to offer visceral, shape-shifting impressions of each veteran's deepest, darkest inner feelings." Christian Blauvelt, writing for IndieWire gave the movie a B−, writing, "while the movie is never less than engaging, the solution is presented a little too much as a silver-bullet for the issues they've identified."

In other reviews, Ann Hornaday of the Washington Post ranked the movie as one of the 10 best of 2025. Time magazine described the movie as "gripping". Rachel Louise Snyder, writing for the New York Times, described scenes from the movie, writing "How rare and beautiful...to see a grown man drowning and then healing something in himself through anguished tears." Clay Beyersdorfer of the Military Times, praising the movie wrote, "What keeps the film grounded is its honesty about how much healing still takes work. The film shows that facing trauma can be just as grueling as any deployment, but it is also an act of courage."

The film was a nominee for the 2026 Cinema Eye Honors Award, Outstanding Achievement in Visual Design.

== Film's aftereffect ==
Director Jon Shenk said in an interview in February 2026 that he hoped the film would contribute to the changing zeitgeist around psychedelics. He noted that some states, namely Texas, California, and South Carolina, are beginning to fund ibogaine research programs because of the drug's potential with addiction issues. For example, in June, 2025 Texas approved $50 million in state funds for ibogaine research. In the same interview Capone stated that VETS has helped pay for treatment for over 1,200 individuals, and has likely given thousands of others hope via the film.

== See also ==
- List of psychedelic documentaries
- List of films featuring the United States Navy SEALs
