= Jon Shenk =

American documentary film maker

- Shenk in 2026
- Born: Cincinnati, Ohio
- Education: Stanford University; Yale University; University of California
- Notable work: In Waves and War; Lead Me Home; Athlete A An Inconvenient Sequel; Audrie & Daisy; The Island President; Lost Boys of Sudan
- Awards: Emmy

Jon Shenk is an American documentary film director and director of photography known for his films In Waves and War, Lead Me Home, Athlete A, An Inconvenient Sequel, Audrie & Daisy,The Island President, Lost Boys of Sudan. He is the co-founder, with his wife Bonni Cohen, of Actual Films, a documentary film company based in San Francisco. He co-directed (with Pedro Kos) and photographed Lead Me Home which was nominated for an Academy Award for Best Documentary (Short Subject) in 2022.

== Career ==
Jon Shenk was born and raised in Cincinnati, Ohio where he graduated from Wyoming High School. He has a bachelor's degree (BA) from Yale University in English Literature and a master’s degree (MA) from Stanford University in documentary filmmaking.

Shenk worked for Lucasfilm as the behind-the-scenes documentary filmmaker covering the making of Star Wars: Episode I – The Phantom Menace and directed the documentary The Beginning: Making Episode 1 (2001). Shenk was the director of photography for the 2008 film Smile Pinki, and he won his first Emmy for Blame Somebody Else (Exposé: America's Investigative Reports/PBS) in 2007.

In 2011, Shenk directed The Island President, which premiered at the Toronto International Film Festival (TIFF), and won the 2011 TIFF's People's Choice Award and The International Documentary Association's (IDA) Pare Lorentz Award. In 2016, he co-directed (with Bonni Cohen) and photographed Audrie & Daisy which premiered in competition at the 2016 Sundance Film Festival, was acquired by Netflix, and won a Peabody Award. He co-directed and photographed An Inconvenient Sequel: Truth to Power, which premiered on opening night of the Sundance Film Festival in 2017, was shortlisted as Best Documentary Feature for the 2018 Oscars, and was nominated for a 2018 BAFTA for Best Documentary. With Bonni Cohen, he co-directed Athlete A, which premiered at the 2020 Tribeca Festival, and won a Grierson Award for Best Sports Documentary and an Emmy Award for Outstanding Investigative Documentary in 2021. In 2024, he and Bonni Cohen directed In Waves and War, a documentary about the post-war struggles of Navy SEAL veterans, and alternative therapies.

== Filmography ==
=== Director ===
- The Beginning: Making 'Episode I' (2001)
- Lost Boys of Sudan (2003)
- The Island President (2011)
- Audrie & Daisy (2016)
- An Inconvenient Sequel: Truth to Power (2017)
- Splash (2019, documentary short)
- Athlete A (2020)
- In Waves and War (2024)

=== Producer ===
- From Puppets to Pixels: Digital Characters in 'Episode II' (2002, producer)
- Lost Boys of Sudan (2003, producer)
- P.O.V. (2004, series, producer, 1 episode)
- The Rape of Europa (2006, producer)
- Exposé: America's Investigative Reports (2007, series, producer, 1 episode), Blame Somebody Else
- Melting Ice (2017, documentary short, co-producer)
- Jaiquan's Sketch (2019, documentary short, executive producer)
- Cooking for Life (2019, documentary short, executive producer)
- Sounds of Life (2019, documentary short, executive producer)
- Be Like Water (2019, documentary short, executive producer)
- Drawn to the Mat (2019, documentary short, executive producer)
- Just Breathe (2019, documentary short, executive producer)
- Nature: No App Required (2019, documentary short, executive producer)
- Splash (2019, documentary short, executive producer)
- The Seer and the Unseen (2019, executive producer)
- Freedom to Dream (2020, documentary short, executive producer)

=== Cinematography ===
- Kofi Annan: Eye of the Storm (1998)
- Frozen Fisherman (1999)
- Nova (2000, series, 1 episode), "Runaway Universe" (2000)
- Lost Boys of Sudan (2003)
- The New Heroes (2005, series, 1 episode) "Power of Enterprise"
- National Geographic Explorer (2005-2010, series, 4 episodes)
- The Rape of Europa (2006)
- Secrets of Revelation (2006)
- The Human Behavior Experiments (2006)
- The Days and the Hours (2006, documentary short)
- Frontline (2006, series, 1 episode) "A Hidden Life"
- Undercover History (2007, series, 1 episode) "J. Edgar Hoover"
- Smile Pinki (2008, documentary short)
- Nourish: Food + Community (2009, documentary short)
- P.O.V. (2009, series, 1 episode) "New Muslim Cool"
- Exposé: America's Investigative Reports (2009, series, 1 episode) "The People's Sheriff"
- The Burning Wigs of Sedition (2010, documentary short)
- Through the Wormhole (2010, series, 1 episode) "Are We Alone?"
- Eames: The Architect & The Painter (2011)
- The Island President (2011)
- A Kind of Order (2013)
- American Jerusalem: Jews and the Making of San Francisco (2013)
- The Revolutionary Optimists (2013)
- The Battle of Amfar (2013, documentary short)
- Audrie & Daisy (2016, director of photography)
- An Inconvenient Sequel: Truth to Power (2017)
- Sounds of Life (2019, documentary short)
- Ruth: Justice Ginsburg in Her Own Words (2019)
- Just Breathe (2019, documentary short)
- Freedom to Dream (2020, documentary short)
- Athlete A (2020)
- In Waves and War (2024)
- The White House Effect (2024)

== Awards ==
- 2003 International Documentary Association Award Nominee, Feature Documentary, Lost Boys of Sudan (2003), shared with Megan Mylan
- 2018 British Academy of Film and Television Arts Nominee, Best Documentary, An Inconvenient Sequel: Truth to Power (2017), shared with Bonni Cohen
- 2020 Critics' Choice Documentary Award Nominee, Best Director, Athlete A (2020), shared with Bonni Cohen
