= Exposé: America's Investigative Reports =

2006 American documentary TV series

- Created by: Stephen Segaller
- Narrated by: Sylvia Chase
- Theme music composer: Douglas J. Cuomo
- Country of origin: United States

Production
- Executive producer: Tom Casciato
- Running time: 23 minutes

Original release
- Network: PBS
- Release: September 1, 2006 – 2009

Exposé: America's Investigative Reports was a half-hour PBS documentary series that detailed some of the most revealing investigative journalism in America. Thirteen/WNET and the Center for Investigative Reporting launched the series as AIR: America's Investigative Reports on September 1, 2006. When the second season premiered on June 22, 2007, the series was retitled Exposé: America's Investigative Reports. Also in 2007, the series won the News & Documentary Emmy Award for Outstanding Story In A News Magazine for the episode "Blame Somebody Else." Exposé's third and final season began on February 22, 2008, and aired as part of the hour-long series Bill Moyers Journal.

== Episodes ==
=== Season 1 ===
No.	Title	Original release date
101	"Crisis Mismanagement"	September 1, 2006
102	"A Bitter Pill"	September 8, 2006
103	"An Inside Job"	September 15, 2006
104	"A Sea of Trouble"	September 22, 2006
105	"Blame Somebody Else"	September 29, 2006
106	"Shooting the War"	October 6, 2006
107	"Policing the Force"	October 13, 2006
108	"Question 7"	October 20, 2006
109	"Nice Work If You Can Get It"	October 27, 2006
110	"Becoming the Story"	November 3, 2006
111	"Science Fiction"	November 10, 2006
112	"Charity Begins at Home"	November 17, 2006

=== Season 2 ===
No.	Title	Original release date
201	"Think Like a Terrorist (Part 1)"	June 22, 2007
202	"Think Like a Terrorist (Part 2)"	June 29, 2007
203	"Friends in High Places"	July 13, 2007
204	"The Scientific Method"	July 20, 2007
205	"Money for Nothing"	July 27, 2007
206	"Death is Different"	September 7, 2007
207	"Eyes on the Road"	September 14, 2007
208	"In a Small Town (Part 1)"	September 28, 2007
209	"In a Small Town (Part 2)"	October 5, 2007
210	"Quid Pro Quo"	October 19, 2007
211	"Security Theater"	October 26, 2007
212	"Sustained Outrage"	November 2, 2007

=== Season 3 ===
No.	Title	Original release date
301	"Mr. Heath Goes to Washington"	February 22, 2008
302	"Cash Cows & Cowboy Starter Kits"	April 11, 2008
303	"Chemistry War Zone"	May 23, 2008
304	"20,000 Cuts a Day"	June 27, 2008
305	"Poverty, Inc."	August 8, 2008
307	"No Justice Out Here"	November 14, 2008
308	"Beneath the North Texas Dirt"	November 21, 2008
309	"A Private War"	December 19, 2008
