= Jaivet Ealom =

- Born: 1992 (age 33–34); Myanmar
- Citizenship: Canadian
- Education: University of Toronto (BA, Economics and Political Science)
- Occupations: Author; Rohingya rights advocate; Political activist
- Writing career
- Subjects: Refugee rights, Rohingya advocacy
- Notable work: Escape from Manus (2021)

Jaivet Ealom is the Secretary-General of the Rohingya Consultative Council, Toronto-based author, former refugee, refugee advocate, and the only person known to have escaped from Manus Island Detention Centre in Papua New Guinea.

== Early life ==
Ealom was born in Myanmar where he faced persecution, as a Rohingya ethnic minority.

In Myanmar, he studied industrial chemistry.

== Flight from Myanmar and detention in Australia ==
=== Escape from Myanmar ===
In 2013 Ealom took a boat to Jakarta, Indonesia. During the journey he nearly drowned, but was pulled from the water by fishermen. From Jakarta, Ealom attempted to sail to Australia. During the journey, Prime Minister Kevin Rudd announced that Australia would not accept refugees arriving by boat.

Ealom was intercepted by Australian authorities, and subsequently imprisoned. He spent six months on Christmas Island before being transferred to Manus Island Processing Centre, aged 21 years.

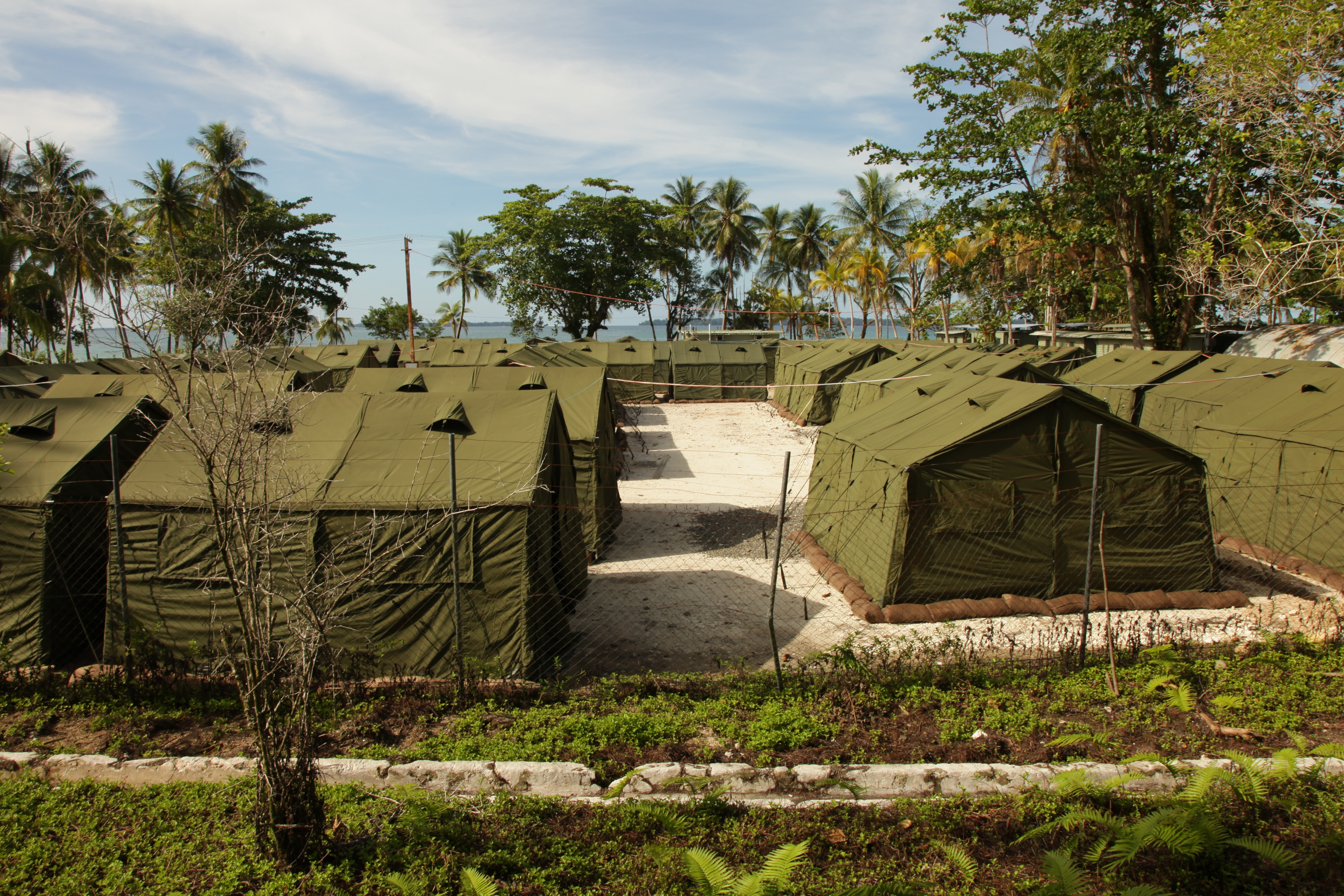
Manus Island Detention Centre, 2012

=== Detention and escape from Manus Island ===
In May 2017, after three and a half years of detention, a suicide attempt, a brief hunger strike, and serious injuries from an attack, Ealom orchestrated his escape.

Using tricks he learned watching Prison Break, including tracking his guards’ schedules, and posing as an interpreter, he managed to exit the center. Assisted by supportive detention center staff, he purchased and boarded a flight to Port Moresby, Papua New Guinea.

=== Journey to Canada ===
From Port Moresby he flew to the Solomon Islands where he learned the local Tok Pisin (Pijin English), pretended he was local and obtained a Solomon Islands' passport. As Solomon Islands is a Commonwealth country, it was possible for him to purchase visa-free travel from Solomon Islands to Canada. During that journey, he was intercepted and suspected of illegal border crossing in Fiji and Hong Kong but persuaded officials to let him continue his journey.

Ealom arrived in Toronto on 24 December 2018 with no money and slept in a homeless shelter.

== Life in Canada ==
On February 22, 2020, Ealom's story was introduced to the general public through a story written by Matthew Knott for the Sydney Morning Herald. On July 2, 2021, his memoir, titled Escape from Manus, was published by Penguin Australia. It was followed by Escape from Manus Prison, an updated version of the book published in August 2022 by Penguin for a North American market.

In 2021, Ealom began working at NeedsList in Toronto, and studied Political Economy at University of Toronto, as well as volunteering with the Canadian Rohingya Development Initiative, now known as the Rohingya Centre of Canada.

In November 2021, he joined the Refugee Advisory Network, the first refugee-led organization established to directly advise the federal government on refugee and immigration policy.

In March 2022, he co-founded the Rohingya Centre of Canada in Kitchener, Ontario to serve hundreds of Rohingya located in the region.

In October 2022, he co-founded Northern Lights Canada, a volunteer-led not-for-profit that encourages private sponsorship and refugee resettlement.

In June 2024, Ealom graduated from the University of Toronto with a double major in Economics and Political Science. On November 7, 2024, he became a Canadian citizen.

Former NUG Minister of Human Rights Aung Myo Min and Advisor Jaivet Ealom attend a photo exhibition on the Rohingya hosted by Greg Constantine at the Alliance Française de Chiang Mai.

He has previously served as an advisor to the National Unity Government's Ministry of Human Rights, and is also a research fellow with the Myanmar Policy and Community Knowledge Hub (MyPACK) based at the University of Toronto.

== Rohingya Consultative Council ==
In 2024, Ealom joined the Rohingya Consultative Council, a platform for Rohingya communities in Myanmar, Bangladesh, and the international diaspora. He served initially as a committee spokesperson. The committee comprised representatives of eight organizations and 25 individuals, following eleven months of consultations with Rohingya stakeholders around the world.

By 2026, Ealom was serving as the Secretary-General of the Rohingya Consulative Council alongside Chairperson Aung Kyaw Moe. In his published commentary in the Democratic Voice of Burma, he argued that resolving the Rohingya crisis requires addressing political exclusion, citizenship, and representation. In October 2026, Ealom published another opinion titled "Get the Rohingya wrong and you get Myanmar wrong", linking the crisis in Myanmar to the situation of the Rohingya.
