= Isfahan Sepehr College =

Isfahan Sepehr College (Persian: موسسه آموزش عالی و غیر انتفاعی سپهر اصفهان) is a College in Isfahan, Iran. It opened in January 2005. At present, the institution offers associate degrees in architecture, painting, theater, visual arts (graphic), and undergraduate degrees in architecture, painting, theater, graphics, film direction, and scriptwriting.

== See also ==
- Isfahan Sepehr College in Wikipedia Persian
