= Megan Mylan =

American documentary film director

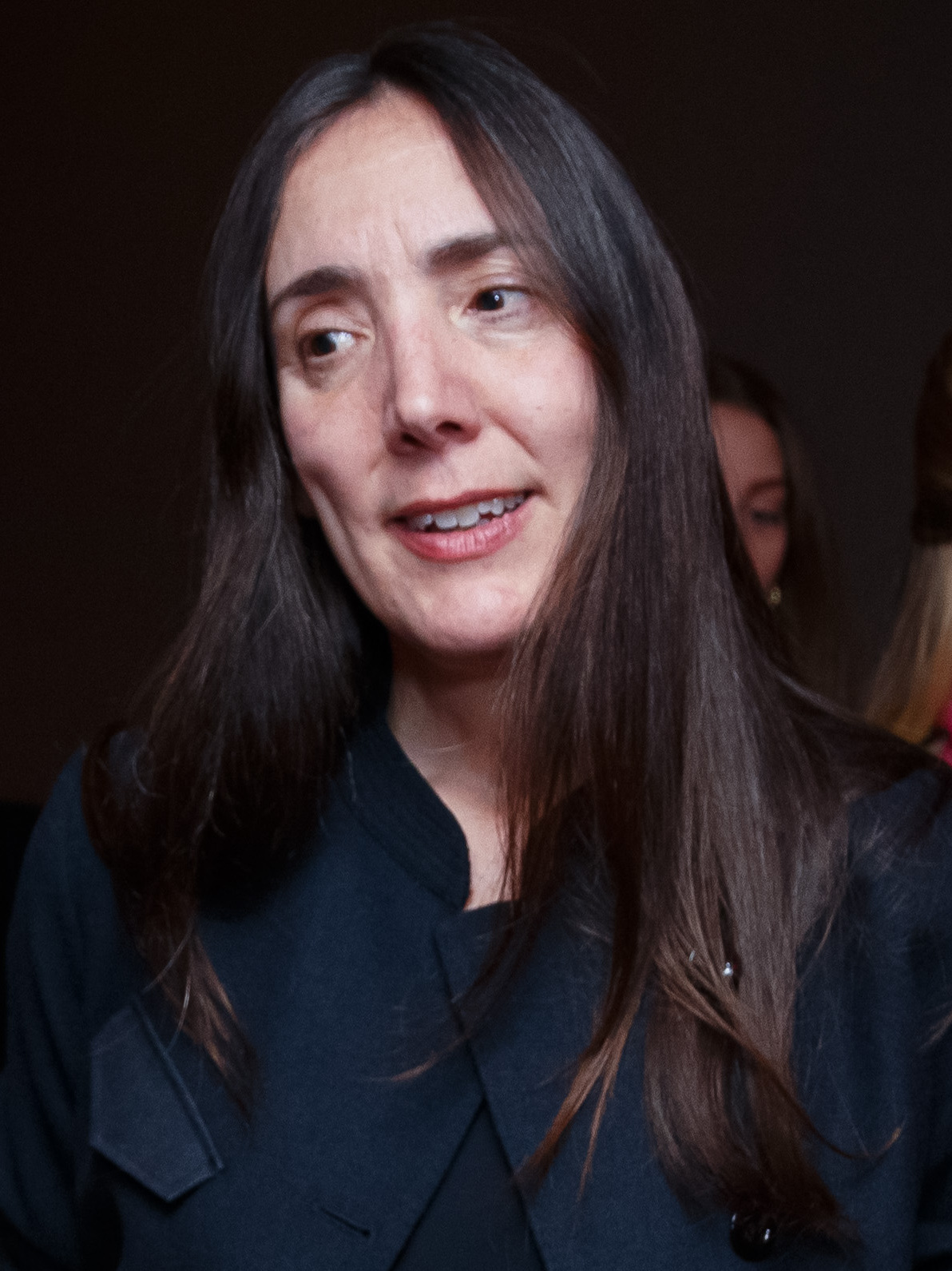
- Born: California
- Education: Highland Park High School, Georgetown University, and University of California,
- Notable work: Simple as Water; Lost Boys of Sudan and Smile Pinki
- Awards: Oscar

Megan Mylan is an Oscar-winning documentary film director, known for her films Simple as Water, Lost Boys of Sudan and Smile Pinki.

Her film Simple as Water, premiered at the 2021 Tribeca Film Festival, and was released theatrically and on HBO/HBO Max. The film was named a New York Times Critics’ Pick, shortlisted for an Oscar best documentary feature and nominated for PGA, IDA, Emmy and Peabody Awards. Lost Boys of Sudan won an Independent Spirit Award, was shortlisted for an Oscar and named a New York Times Critics’ Pick. Mylan won an Academy Award for her documentary short Smile Pinki in 2008. Her films have screened theatrically and on television throughout the world including HBO, PBS, ARTE, BBC, NHK, NDTV, Sundance Channel, Doordarshan and TV Brasil. She is the recipient of a Guggenheim Fellowship, and multiple Emmy nominations. She served for several years on the Academy of Motion Picture Arts and Sciences' Executive Committee for Documentary.

Mylan was born in California and raised in Salem, Oregon and Dallas, Texas, where she graduated Highland Park High School. Before beginning in documentary, she worked in the U.S. and Brazil for Ashoka an international development non-profit. She has a bachelor's degree from the Georgetown University School of Foreign Service, and master's degrees in journalism and Latin American studies from the University of California, Berkeley where she was also guest director of the Graduate Documentary program.
