= Compact Ignition Tokamak =

Proposed plasma physics experiment

CIT
Compact Ignition Tokamak
- Device type: Tokamak
- Location: United States
- Affiliation: Princeton Plasma Physics Laboratory and others

Technical specifications
- Major radius: 1.23 m (4 ft 0 in)
- Minor radius: 0.43 m (1 ft 5 in)
- Magnetic field: 10.4 T (104,000 G)
- Heating power: 12 MW
- Plasma current: 10.0 MA

History
- Date(s) of construction: Not built
- Year(s) of operation: Not built–Not built

The Compact Ignition Tokamak (CIT) was a plasma physics experiment that was designed but not built. It was designed by an inter-organizational team in the US led by Princeton Plasma Physics Laboratory. The experiment was designed to achieve a self-sustaining thermonuclear fusion reaction (ignition) in a tokamak with the minimum possible budget.

== History ==
CIT was to be the successor experiment to the Tokamak Fusion Test Reactor (TFTR). Where TFTR was designed to achieve Q>1 (more fusion power produced by the plasma than injected into the plasma), CIT was designed to achieve ignition, here defined as Q>10 (fusion power produced is more than ten times the heating power). Design of CIT began in 1986, at which point it was expected that construction would begin in 1988 and complete in 1993. The estimated cost of construction was $285 Million in 1986 dollars.

As development progressed, the tokamak design grew in size, magnetic field, and heating power. At some point in the early 1990s, the DOE canceled the project and supported instead the design of the Tokamak Physics Experiment (TPX), which was also never built.

Further extensions of the compact high-field approach of CIT were studied in later U.S. national design projects for two proposed devices: the Burning Plasma Experiment (BPX) and the Fusion Ignition Research Experiment (FIRE). The Snowmass 2002 national fusion community planning meeting concluded "IGNITOR, FIRE, and ITER would enable studies of the physics of burning plasma, advance fusion technology, and contribute to the development of fusion energy... There is confidence that ITER and FIRE will achieve burning plasma performance in H–mode based on an extensive experimental database...".

== Goals ==
The goal of the CIT was to produce an ignited plasma, which is defined as Q>10, and/or the ability to shut off auxiliary heating and have fusion power sustain the reaction. Furthermore it was designed to do this with a minimum possible budget.

The resultant design followed a path laid out by the earlier IGNITOR design, a compact, high-field design. To minimize cost, it was a compact (physically small) device. In order to achieve ignition conditions in a compact device, it was required to have a very high magnetic field, 10.4 (later 11) tesla. This was beyond the critical field capabilities of the Superconductors of the time, which necessitated the toroidal field coils be constructed out of copper cooled by Liquid nitrogen.

== Limitations ==
The goal of studying the physics and engineering of an ignited plasma with the minimum possible cost meant accepting a design that did not directly scale into a reactor (given the technology available at that time). Because the copper toroidal field coils would quickly heat up due to Ohmic heating, the experiment would be pulsed, achieving ignition for only 3–5 seconds, with minutes or hours of cool-down time between pulses. (More recent advances in high-field superconductors have led to a reconsideration of the pulsed high-field approach, such as the SPARC device being developed by Commonwealth Fusion Systems.) Furthermore, because of the repetitive materials stresses inherent in a pulsed, high-field system, crack growth kept the total lifetime number of full-power pulses to 3,000.
