= Bonni Cohen =

American director and filmmaker

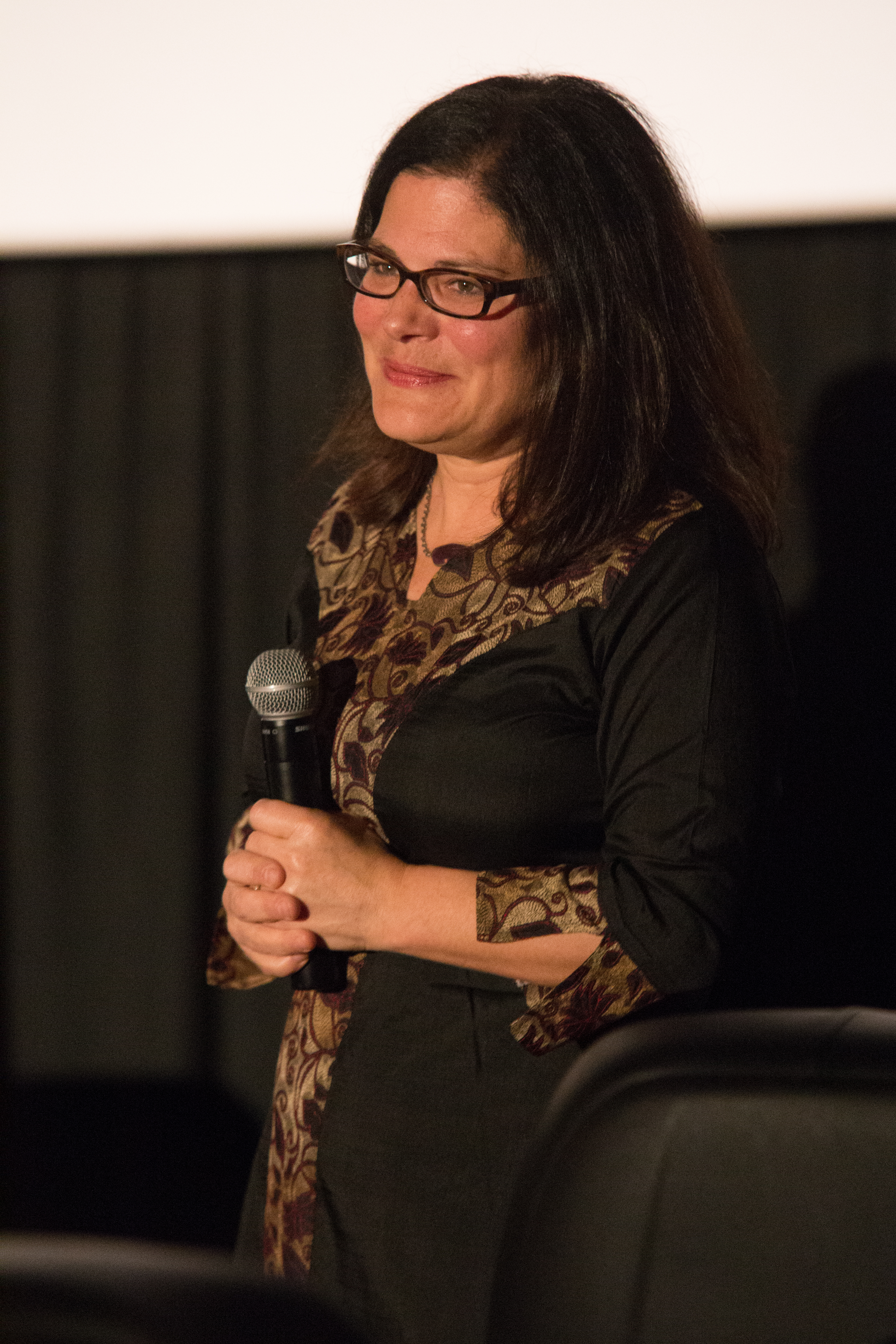
Cohen in 2016

Bonni Cohen is an American documentary film producer and director. She is the co-founder of Actual Films and has produced and directed an array of award-winning films. Most recently, she co-directed, along with husband Jon Shenk, the 2024 documentary In Waves and War, which was released on Netflix in November, 2025. She also produced the Oscar-nominated film Lead Me Home, which premiered at the 2021 Telluride Film Festival and is a Netflix Original. She also recently co-directed Athlete A, which won an Emmy for Outstanding Investigative Documentary and received four nominations from the Critics’ Choice Awards. She is the co-founder of Actual Films, the production company of the documentaries An Inconvenient Sequel: Truth to Power, Audrie & Daisy, 3.5 Minutes, The Island President, Lost Boys of Sudan and The Rape of Europa. Cohen is the co-founder of the Catapult Film Fund.

== Career ==
Cohen co-directed the 2024 documentary In Waves and War. She also co-directed Athlete A and An Inconvenient Sequel: Truth to Power. In 2016, Cohen co-directed the film Audrie & Daisy, which premiered at the 2016 Sundance Film Festival where it was acquired by Netflix.

Cohen is the producer of The Island President, a documentary about the first democratically elected president of the Maldives, Mohamed Nasheed. In 2009, Cohen produced the film Wonders are Many, directed by Jon Else, which premiered at the Sundance Film Festival in 2007. Cohen co-directed Inside Guantanamo with Else. Cohen also served as Executive Producer of the documentary films 3.5 Minutes and Art and Craft.

== Filmography ==
=== Directed features ===
- In Waves and War (2024)
- Athlete A (2020)
- Just Breathe (2019, documentary short)
- An Inconvenient Sequel: Truth to Power (2017)
- Audrie & Daisy (2016)
- National Geographic Explorer (2007–2009, series, 3 episodes)
  - Inside Guantanamo (2009)
  - Inside Bethlehem (2007)
  - The Last Christians of Bethlehem (2007)
- The Rape of Europa (2006)
- Wild on the Set (2000, series, 1 episode, 2000)
  - Snakes (2000, second director)
  - Primates (2000)
- Kofi Annan: Eye of the Storm (1998)
- Meet Me in Miami Beach (1994, documentary short)

=== Producing credits ===
- Marlee Matlin: Not Alone Anymore (2025, producer)
- Freedom to Dream (2020, documentary short, executive producer)
- Jaiquan's Sketch (2019, documentary short, executive producer)
- Cooking for Life (2019, documentary short, executive producer)
- Sounds of Life (2019, documentary short, executive producer)
- Cooked: Survival by Zip Code (2019, consulting producer)
- Be Like Water (2019, documentary short, executive producer)
- Drawn to the Mat (2019, documentary short, executive producer)
- Just Breathe (2019, documentary short, executive producer)
- Nature: No App Required (2019, documentary short, executive producer)
- Splash (2019, documentary short, executive producer)
- The Seer and the Unseen (2019, executive producer)
- Life Overtakes Me (2019, documentary short, executive producer)
- When God Sleeps (2017, executive producer)
- Melting Ice (2017, documentary short, co-producer)
- Extremis (2016, documentary short, executive producer)
- Audrie & Daisy (2016, producer)
- P.O.V. (2015, series, executive producer, 1 episode)
  - Art and Craft
- 3 1/2 Minutes, 10 Bullets (2015, executive producer)
- The Last Season (2014, consulting producer)
- Art and Craft (2014, executive producer)
- American Jerusalem: Jews and the Making of San Francisco (2013, executive producer)
- Independent Lens (2008–2013, series, producer, 2 episodes)
  - Island President (2013)
  - Wonders Are Many: The Making of "Doctor Atomic" (2008)
- The Island President (2011, producer)
- National Geographic Explorer (2007, series, producer, 1 episode)
  - The Last Christians of Bethlehem
- Undercover History (2007, series, producer, 1 episode)
  - J. Edgar Hoover
- Wonders Are Many (2007, producer)
- The Rape of Europa (2006, executive producer, producer)
- Open Outcry (2001, producer)
- They Drew Fire (2000, producer)
- Kofi Annan: Eye of the Storm (1998, producer)
- The Human Sexes (1997, series, producer)

== Awards and nominations ==
- 1998 Emmy Nominee, Outstanding Non-Fiction Series, The Human Sexes (1997), shared with Sandra Gregory (executive producer), Michael Rosenberg (executive producer), Clive Bromhall (series producer), Clare Hargreaves, Beverley Parr, John Longley, Desmond Morris (host/writer)
- 2000 International Documentary Association Award Nominee, Strand Program, They Drew Fire (2000), shared with Nicole Newnham and Brian Lanker
- 2008 Writers Guild of America Award Nominee, Documentary Screenplay, The Rape of Europa (2006), shared with Richard Berge and Nicole Newnham
- 2011 Toronto International Film Festival People's Choice Award Winner, The Island President (2011), shared with Richard Berge
- 2018 British Academy of Film and Television Arts Nominee, Best Documentary, An Inconvenient Sequel: Truth to Power (2017), shared with Jon Shenk
- 2020 Critics Choice Documentary Awards Nominee, Athlete A (2020), shared with Jon Shenk
