= Spur Posse =

Students from California high school in the US

The Spur Posse was a "suburban clique" of former and current Lakewood High School students from Lakewood, California. The members of the group, estimated to be between 20 and 30 individuals, admitted to "competing for 'points' in a long-running game of sexual conquests." Accusations of sexual assault and misconduct against the group was filed by seven girls in 1993. On March 18, 1993, nine members of the group were arrested by the Los Angeles County Sheriff’s Department for sex crimes including sexual assault, lewd conduct, and statutory rape of a 10-year-old minor.

The Los Angeles County Sheriff's Department initially charged nine members of the group with 17 felony counts, but "the Los Angeles County district attorney’s office declined to file charges against four youths, dropping 15 charges, concluding that the sexual encounters had occurred with the consent of the girls." National media attention of the case soon followed, and several members of the group went on talk shows to discuss the Spur Posse and its sexual values. Eventually, prosecutors controversially dropped all but one charge. One member of the group was convicted with lewd conduct with a minor under the age of 14 and spent less than a year in the Dorothy Kirby Center, a juvenile detention center in Commerce, CA.

== Members ==
The Spur Posse had an estimated membership of 20 to 30 individuals of the "town's best-looking, most-popular teen-agers." Only a handful have publicly claimed or have been identified as members of the Spur Posse:

- Dana Belman
- Kristopher Belman
- Christopher Albert
- Jimmy Rafkin
- Billy Shehan
- Christopher Russo
- Lonnie Rodriguez
- Kevin Howard
- Jeff Howard
- Shad Blackman
- Eric Richardson
- Mike Weber
- Dana Kawamura
- Ronnie Breceda

== Background ==
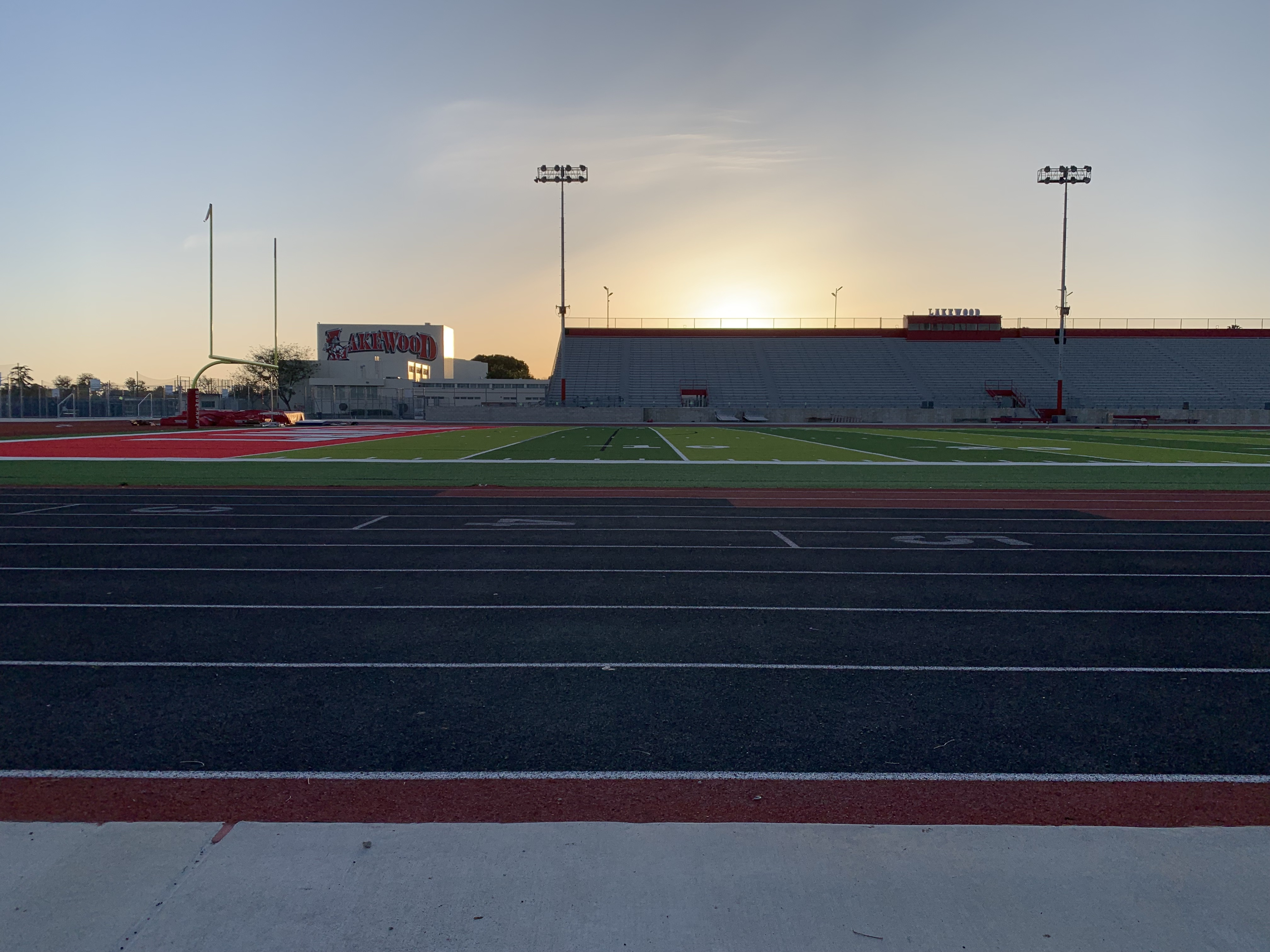
Football field of Lakewood High School in Lakewood, California

Dana Belman, a varsity football player and linebacker on Lakewood High School's football team, initiated the creation of the clique, Spur Posse, in 1990. The group initially consisted of 14 members of the high school's football team who would congregate after school to play basketball wearing San Antonio Spurs caps, naming themselves after their favorite team. The group's leaders, brothers Dana and Kristopher Belman, devised a scoring system as a "source of friendly competition among members" that awarded "one point for penetration, only one point allowed for each girl." One member, Billy Shehan, claimed to be the top scorer of the group, with 66 sexual encounters. Several of the Spurs were star athletes, "powerful young men worshiped by peers and parents," who liked parties, football games and girls.

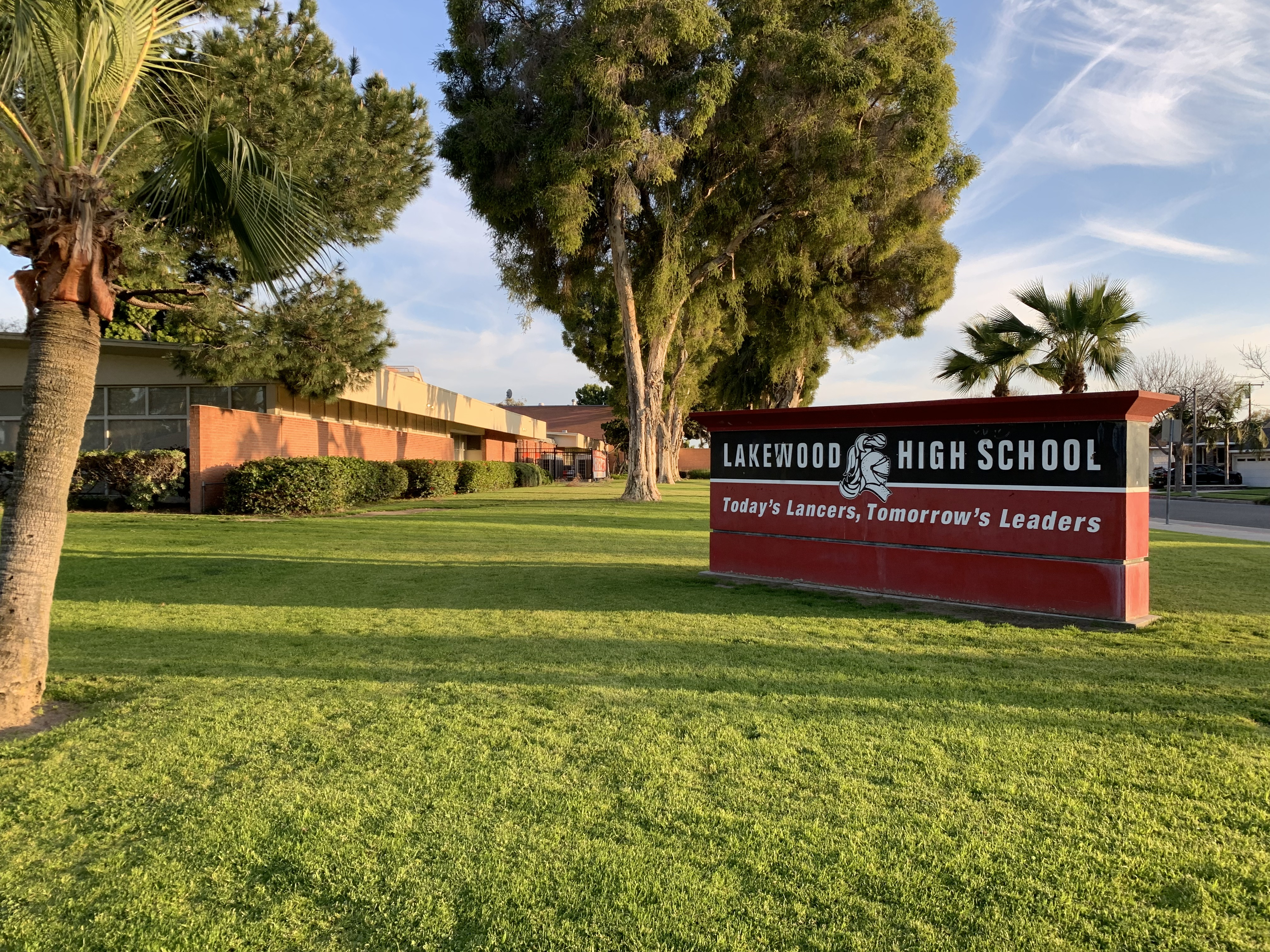
Exterior of Lakewood High School in California

In March 1993, seven young women, including an 11-year-old, filed complaints against members of the Spur Posse, accusing them of sexual misconduct and assault over the span of 5 months in 1992. The Los Angeles County Sheriff's Department arrested eight youths and one 18-year-old, Kristopher Belman, for "17 felony counts of rape, unlawful intercourse and related charges." According to investigators, "the gang victimized perhaps scores of young women, using persuasion and threats to score 'points' in their long-running game of conquests." One victim, a 16-year-old girl, told an investigator that "a Spur had removed her clothes in a park during a sexual encounter, then refused to give them back until she had sex with other Spurs. She said her clothing was returned only after she screamed. She believes the commotion prevented a gang rape." Another victim had an abortion after being "forced to have sex with several boys."

Members, friends and family of the Spur Posse defended themselves as a nonviolent group. Defenders of the group claimed that all their sexual encounters were consensual, calling one of the accusers "a liar and a slut." The Los Angeles District Attorney office declined to file 15 of the 17 charges, pursuing only one of the boys "for allegedly having sex with a 10-year-old girl." The district attorney's office claimed that they could not prove the other charges, "saying that the matter was a "social" problem better left to churches, schools and parents to handle." The other eight members were released less than a week later. Only one youth was convicted for lewd conduct with a minor under the age of 14, and served less than a year in a juvenile detention center for the crime. Kris Belman was charged with "the alleged molestation of a 13-year-old girl" but "charges were dropped after he completed the informal probation." District Attorney, Sandy Buttitta, in a written statement wrote, "Our conclusion is that there is no credible evidence of forcible rape involving any of these boys...Although there is evidence of unlawful sexual intercourse, it is the policy of this office not to file criminal charges where there is consensual sex between teen-agers...The arrogance and contempt for young women which have been displayed, while appalling, cannot form the basis for criminal charges.”

== In the media ==
When allegations against the Spur Posse came to light, a media frenzy surrounded the case. Members of the Spur Posse were invited to talk shows, interviewed for publications, and placed on covers of magazines. Appearances on national TV included The Jenny Jones Show, Night Talk With Jane Whitney, Maury, Nightline, The Montel Williams Show, Dateline, The Phil Donahue Show, Inside Edition and Home Show. They appeared on the front page of the New York Times and Newsweek and posed for Sassy, a teen girl's magazine, and Penthouse. The local paper listed upcoming television appearances, under headlines as the Posse Premiere and The Spur Posse on TV.

TV show producers vied for the Spur Posse's attention and plied them with paid trips to NYC. Billy Shehan reported to Newsweek that a senior staffer from Night Talk With Jane Whitney took them to a strip bar, Goldfingers, in a limo. The Maury Povich Show "wooed the boys by sending them out for the evening with four young women from the program's staff." When asked why they would be compelled to appear on TV, Billy Shehan, said "You gotta get your image out there. It's all about building that image on a worldwide basis." Many of the Spurs hoped that the exposure would offer them opportunities into acting, modeling, radio and comedy.

Some members of the group sought representation by talent agencies, but failed to secure any deals. Several agents said that they wouldn't feel comfortable profiting off alleged sexual assault crimes of minors. Jill Holwager, an agent of United Talent Agency, said, "I would be using my skills to make these guys a lot of money and make them really famous, and I thought that was wrong."

== Public reaction ==
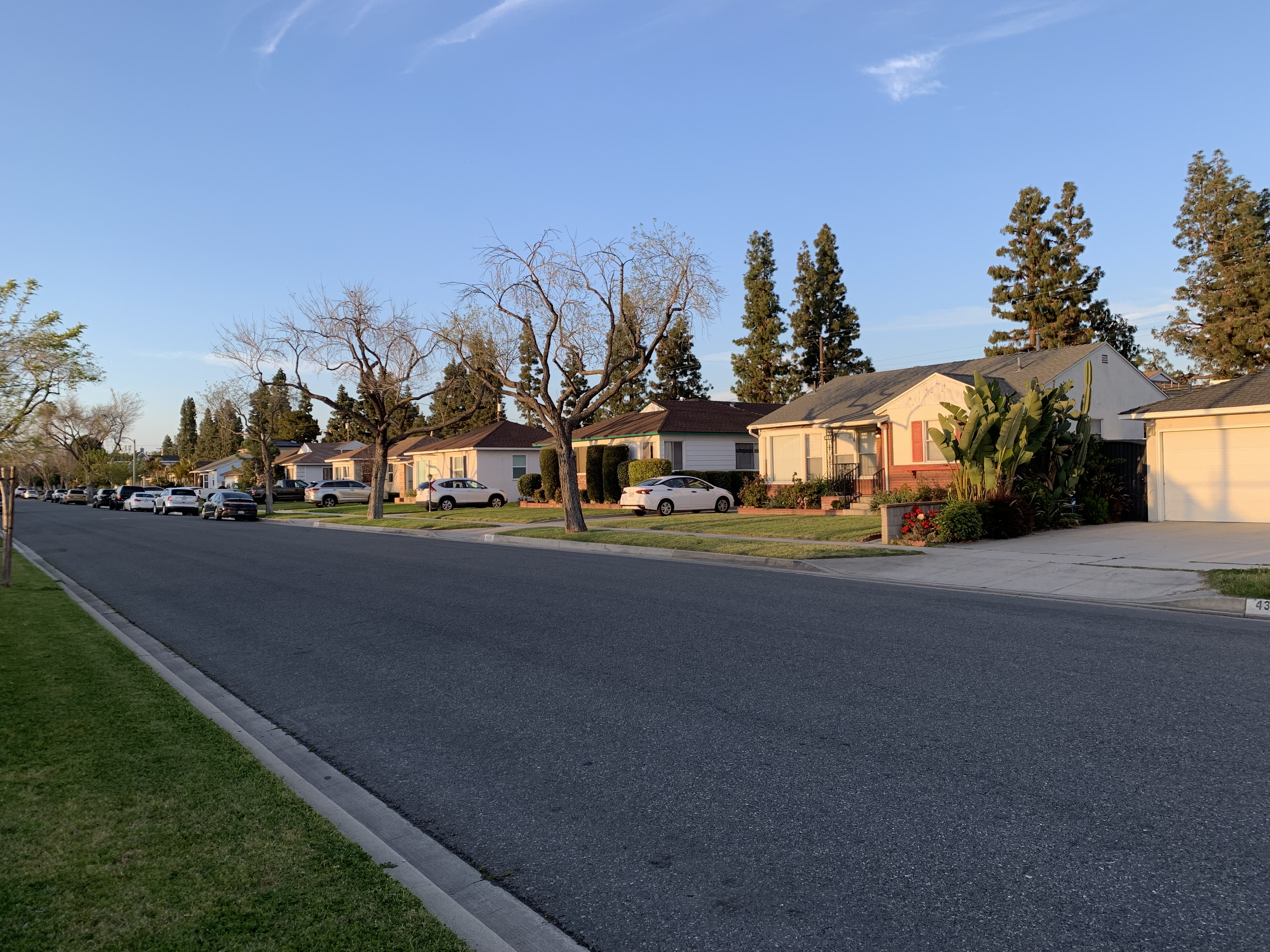
Street view of a middle-class neighborhood in Lakewood, California.

The scandal divided the community of Lakewood, with some condemning the actions of the group and others claiming that the situation was blown out of proportion. After the nine members were released from arrest, they returned to a "hero's welcome at school." Some students, both male and female, supported the Spurs' claim of innocence, saying that their accusers were "willing participants who sought status by sleeping with athletes." A 15-year-old freshman girl remarked, “There are so many girls out there who want to sleep with these guys. They are so fine. They wouldn’t have to rape anyone.”

Detractors of the group were outraged when charges were dropped by the district attorney. Around 200 parents attended a meeting to condemn the Spur Posse claiming that "the clique had terrorized the community, picking fights with male classmates and raping and threatening female students in a pattern that has escalated since the arrests." At the time, many of the parents of the accused Spurs were unperturbed by the accusations. Donald Belman, after the release of his son, Kristopher, from custody, said "Nothing my boy did was anything any red-blooded American boy wouldn't do at his age." Dottie Belman told a reporter, "Those girls are trash," referring to the accusers. Diane Hurst, mother of a Spur, thought it was "sad for the girls that they have such low self-esteem that they would do this...it's a testosterone thing."

Under the glare of public scrutiny, Lakewood "became identified with rampant promiscuity and familial dysfunction" and gained the moniker of "Rapewood". The sway the group had over the town prompted a larger discussion about sexual harassment and misogyny in American schools. The media characterized the behavior of the group as fueled by the sexual revolution of the '90s, "aided and abetted by MTV and Hollywood violence." Rev. Ginny Wagener, executive director of the South Coast Ecumenical Council, did not view the Spurs as an isolated incident, stating that "society promotes male dominance and sexual promiscuity. It's in the culture." There was a pervasive "boys will be boys" mentality in the Spur Posse's defense, that young men are "incapable of bringing either responsibility or humanity to their sexual activity." One columnist, Clarence Page, wondered if the members of the Spur Posse were black, would they "be viewed less with wonderment and titillation than with dismay, horror, embarrassment and lofty talk about 'pathologies,' 'the underclass' and responsibilities, personal and societal." Families of the Spur Posse were middle-class and privileged, and their values could not be "blamed on poverty or discrimination." "Misguided values" allowed the Spur Posse to operate without fear of consequences through victim blaming of young women.

== Aftermath ==
Victims reported that they notified school officials of threats "for months and walk the campus hallways in constant fear." In a news conference, Gloria Allred "fired a warning shot at school officials by suggesting that they knew about at least one rape charge in December but took no action." Lakewood High Principal Mike Escalante said that students were being offered various options such as schedule changes or transfers. School officials also planned assemblies and forums to educate students about date rape and sexual harassment.

Burglary charges against a member of the Spur Posse surfaced as a result of the sexual allegations. After being invited to the homes of junior high school girls, authorities said Belman "entered the girls’ parents’ bedroom and took credit cards, which he used" in June 1992. Authorities also claimed that Belman stole 21 guns from a residence during a party. Belman and Christopher Russo were arrested in Las Vegas after attempting to use the stolen credit cards and detained again in December 1993 for forging checks. Dana Belman was sentenced to 10 years in prison for 13 burglary and fraud convictions in 1994.

A member of the Spur Posse was targeted in a racially motivated attack by a white supremacist group, Fourth Reich Skinheads. According to the prosecution, a juvenile set off a pipe bomb on one of the homes of a Spur member, "chosen because it was owned by a black man, while the Spur Posse member allegedly was picked because he is part Mexican and part Asian."

Members of the group and some of their families were shunned by their community, unable to find employment because of their infamy and continued to have run-ins with the law. Christopher Albert, a member of the Spur Posse, was "killed during rowdy Fourth of July celebrations in Huntington Beach" in 1995. Albert was fatally shot by Esteban Quiroz during an argument. In 1996, Spur Posse members Dana Kawamura and Ronnie Breceda "were arrested in connection with the near fatal stabbing of a young man at a New Year’s Eve party in Seal Beach. Kawamura and Breceda have been charged with attempted murder and assault with a deadly weapon." Mike Weber spent time in jail for assault with a deadly weapon.

== In culture ==
Joan Didion wrote a celebrated article about the Spur Posse, titled "Trouble in Lakewood", published as part of the "Letter from California" column in The New Yorker on July 26, 1993. The article was also included in a different form in her 2003 book, Where I Was From. Didion's essay detailed the dark side of California suburbia tying moral decay to the deterioration of economic opportunities. Gustavo Arellano, in an essay for The Los Angeles Times, writes that Didion "unmasks the misogyny and racial animus of Lakewood’s white population."

The Spur Posse was covered at length in Susan Faludi's book Stiffed: The Betrayal of the American Man, including their formation, their fame and appearance on talk shows, and the aftermath. HBO planned to adapt the book "into an anthology of one or perhaps two films dramatizing the stories of some of the men depicted in the book" in 1999.

The X Files mentions the group in an episode, "Red Museum." Fox Mulder, played by David Duchovny, says "I think the Spur Posse just rode into town" after seeing a group of hostile teenagers. Dana Scully, played by Gillian Anderson, later quips, "kinda hard to tell who's the villain without a score card."

In 1995, Law & Order broadcast an episode, "Performance", based upon the case.

The group was mentioned in Spin Magazine's "Soy Un Perdedor: The 50 Worst Moments of the ’90s".

The main villains in the 1999 horror film, The Rage: Carrie 2, were based on the Spur Posse.

Spur Posse is mentioned in the Bratmobile song Brat Girl.

A made for TV movie, Restless Virgins, recalls Spur Posse's "sex for points" system that aired on Lifetime in 2013.

== See also ==
- Steubenville High School rape case
- Torrington High School rape cases
- Vanderbilt rape case
- Glen Ridge rape
- Sexual assault of Savannah Dietrich
- Audrie & Daisy
  - Audrie Pott
  - Daisy Coleman
- Suicide of Rehtaeh Parsons
- Baylor University sexual assault scandal
- La Salle University basketball scandal
