= Glen Ridge rape =

1989 rape of a girl in Glen Ridge, New Jersey

Coordinates: 40.788°N 74.212°W

- Map of Glen Ridge, New Jersey
- Date: March 1, 1989
- Location: Glen Ridge, New Jersey, U.S.
- First reporter: WNBC-TV
- Participants: 7
- Charges: Gang rape
- Verdict: Guilty

On March 1, 1989, an intellectually disabled 17-year-old girl was raped with a broomstick and a baseball bat by members of the Glen Ridge High School football team in Glen Ridge, New Jersey. This event attracted nationwide attention, mainly due to the perception that the assailants had been given special treatment by the school and local authorities due to their status as local football stars. The events were later documented in a book and TV movie and a show.

== Assault ==
The victim, who had an intellectual disability and was later determined to have an IQ of 64, left her house the afternoon of the incident to go play basketball in Carteret Park. On the way, she found a stick which she decided to keep. When she arrived at the park, many of the school's athletes were there, either watching or participating in an informal baseball practice. One of the boys came over to her and asked her to come down to a basement of a nearby house for a party. The house was adjacent to the park and the owners were in Florida, with only the grandmother being home at that time.

After initially refusing, she agreed when she was told that the boy's brother, whom she had a crush on, would go on a date with her. He put his arm around the victim and escorted her to the basement. When they reached the basement, 12 boys from the park were there. After some conversation, one of the boys removed his pants and underpants and the victim removed her shirt. At this point, a sophomore and another underclassman left. A total of six boys left while the victim undressed.

Seven boys stayed, all football players and all seniors but one. The victim was then orally raped. She was forced to bend over and the boys took turns vaginally penetrating her. The victim was then penetrated with a broom by two of those present and she was penetrated with a baseball bat. The broom and bat were covered with plastic bags coated with Vaseline. At one point during the rape, one of the athletes passively suggested that they stop. After it was over, she promised not to tell, then waited outside the house for a long time, waiting for the promised date, which never happened.

A number of boys later attempted to get the victim to come down to the basement a second time to repeat the incident. The first staff member to report the incident was a teacher who overheard a student discussing the rumors with a classmate. The student had been asked earlier to videotape a planned second incident (which never took place). The vice principal then called the police on March 22, three weeks after the assault occurred. Police interviewed the vice principal and the victim's swim coach, the latter of whom had heard about the incident from the victim herself three days after the incident. Detective Lieutenant Richard Corcoran put Detective Sheila Byron in charge of investigating the case. Byron's main focus was to establish if the victim had given consent, or whether she was incapable of giving consent.

During her interviews with the victim, it became clear to Byron that the victim did not completely understand what had happened to her, so she would not have known she could say no. During the investigation, it became clear that the victim still wanted the athletes to like her and that she did not want to get them in trouble.

Byron realized she would need independent corroboration, because the victim might not make a convincing witness in a trial. The prosecutor's office officially became involved with the investigation on April 7 and officially took control on April 12.

== First public reports ==
The first public report of the incident was on May 23, 1989, by the local NBC station WNBC-TV. Over the next few days the story was picked up in newspapers across the United States and Canada. The New York Times and Washington Post ran their first articles regarding the incident on May 25, 1989, the same day the story was picked up by newspapers in Lewiston, Maine, and Spokane, Washington. The Los Angeles Times first carried the story in its paper on May 26, 1989, and the Toronto Star became the first foreign newspaper to carry the story, also on May 26, 1989, the same day the story hit newspapers in northern Alabama and Tampa, Florida.

== Trial, verdict and appeals ==
The trial took place over the course of 23 weeks from 1992 to 1993, and was presided over by Judge R. Benjamin Cohen. A pretrial ruling lifted New Jersey's rape shield law to allow testimony about the victim's past sexual history. Prosecutor Robert D. Laurino referred to the defendants as threats to their community and asked the judge to revoke their bail. He pointed to Christopher Archer as the "mastermind" behind the rape, referencing a sexual assault committed against a female college student following his arrest for the Glen Ridge rape. The defense lawyers—Thomas Ford, Alan Zegas, and Michael Querques—used what the New Jersey Law Journal called the "Lolita Defense". They suggested during cross-examinations that the victim was not a victim but a promiscuous "seductress" who aggressively started and willingly participated in the sexual acts, and the defendants needed protection from her. This strategy was received poorly throughout the trial due to its implications of victim blaming and the defense lawyers' nonchalant attitudes during courtroom breaks. The jury deliberated for eight days. While they agreed early on that the woman was incapable of saying no due to her disability, it took three more days for the jurors to determine whether or not the defendants were or should have been aware of this.

Christopher Archer and Kevin Scherzer were convicted in 1993 of a second-degree count of conspiracy and two first-degree counts of aggravated sexual assault with the bat and broom. Kyle Scherzer was found guilty of second-degree conspiracy, first-degree aggravated sexual assault by use of force or coercion and second-degree attempted aggravated sexual assault. Bryant Grober was convicted of a single third-degree conspiracy charge.

Archer, Scherzer and Scherzer were all sentenced to a maximum of 15 years in a "young adult offenders" prison. Grober was sentenced to three years of probation and two hundred hours of community service. All three defendants were granted bail pending appeal.

On appeal, the convictions for the minor offenses were reversed, but the convictions for the major offense of first-degree aggravated sexual assault were upheld, with Kyle Scherzer's sentence being reduced to seven years. All three began serving their sentences in 1997.

In 2004, after all three had served their prison sentences, they again appealed their convictions to try to clear their names and to stay off New Jersey's sexual offender registry. The convictions were upheld.

== Our Guys ==
=== Book ===
Bernard Lefkowitz wrote a book about the Glen Ridge rape called Our Guys: The Glen Ridge Rape and the Secret Life of the Perfect Suburb. The book attributes many of the problems with the football players to their society's (as well as the town's and the parents') heavy emphasis on winning and success rather than on personal character. The book was later adapted into a TV movie.

=== Television film ===
The events of the Glen Ridge rape were adapted into a television movie (and subsequent DVD) called Our Guys: Outrage at Glen Ridge, which premiered on ABC in 1999 and is, occasionally, featured on Lifetime. The film, directed by Guy Ferland, stars Ally Sheedy, Eric Stoltz and Heather Matarazzo and is an adaptation of Bernard Lefkowitz's book. The rape scene of the film was, notably, toned-down due to the film being on broadcast television. Some of the things events and details described in Lefkowitz's book were omitted from the film, out of respect. The film renamed several characters and invented several new ones. The film also altered the timeline of events, such as the rape being reported in the fall (in the film, it is football season; opening scenes are of a Homecoming event), when, in reality, the rape was reported in the springtime.

Characters

- Detective Kelly Brooks (Ally Sheedy)
- Prosecutor Robert Laurino (Eric Stoltz) — Stoltz also narrates a brief summary of the later lives of some of the characters at the film's end.
- Leslie Faber (Heather Matarazzo), a pseudonym assigned to the victim by Bernard Lefkowitz
- Ros Faber (Sara Botsford)
- Paul Archer (Scott Vickaryous) — In the film, he suggests to his friends that they stop the attack, when Kyle Scherzer was actually responsible for the suggestion during the real incident.
- Lt. Frank Bennett (Eric Keenleyside)
- Charles Faber (Michael Tomlinson)
- Doug Archer (Art Hindle)
- Mrs. Archer (Gwynyth Walsh)
- Barry Bennett (Brendan Fehr)
- Chris Archer (Tygh Runyan)
- John Tierney (Kett Turton)
- Carl Brewer (Doron Bell)
- Bryant Grover (Derek Hamilton)
- Officer Balke (Lochlyn Munro)
- Mr. Jack Scherzer (Stephen Miller)
- Kevin Scherzer (Ryan Taylor)
- Kyle Scherzer (Will Sanderson)
- Peter Quigley (Aaron Smolinski)
- Mari Farreaz (Carly Pope)
- Amy Ryan (Amber Rothwell) — The party at this character's house actually happened two years before the events depicted in the film.
- Judge Cohen (David Abbott)

== See also ==
- Vanderbilt rape case
- Spur Posse
- Murder of Junko Furuta
- Steubenville High School rape case
- Torrington High School rape cases
- Sexual assault of Savannah Dietrich
- Audrie & Daisy
  - Audrie Pott
  - Daisy Coleman
- Suicide of Rehtaeh Parsons
- Baylor University sexual assault scandal
- La Salle University basketball scandal
