= Sexual assault of Savannah Dietrich =

2011 crime in Kentucky, US

Louisville teen sexual assault case
- Location: Louisville, Kentucky
- Date: August 2011
- Attack type: Sexual assault
- Victim: Savannah Dietrich
- Perpetrators: Will Frey and Austin Zehnder
- Charges: Sexual abuse in the first degree and voyeurism

In August 2011, a female American high-school student named Savannah Dietrich was sexually assaulted by Will Frey and Austin Zehnder, lacrosse players from Trinity High School, an exclusive Catholic high school in Louisville, Kentucky. The assault was photographed by Frey and Zehnder and other observers, and images and comments from the incident went viral on the internet.

In a plea bargain, two 16-year-old boys Frey and Zehnder pleaded guilty to sexual abuse in the first degree, a felony, and voyeurism, a misdemeanor. Dietrich released the names of her attackers and argued publicly that they were not adequately punished despite being instructed not to discuss the case by the presiding judge. International controversy regarding the case developed when attorneys for the boys attempted to have her held in contempt, but the motion was subsequently dropped.

Afterwards, at the time of sentencing, the judge said that because of the "serious nature" of the crime, she would revise the punishment requested by the prosecutor. Accordingly, the judge removed a provision that would have expunged the defendants' records upon reaching age 19 1/2, and also ordered that their community service be served at a charity that deals with women's issues.

== Initial court proceedings, plea deal, and privacy law ==
The two defendants pleaded guilty to sexual abuse in the first degree, a felony and voyeurism, a misdemeanor. The initial plea-deal agreed to by the prosecutor was 50 hours of community service, a diversion agreement, counseling, and a provision to expunge the defendants' criminal records—provided they maintained good behavior—at age 19 1/2. Paul Richwalsky, the prosecutor in the case was a graduate and booster of Trinity High School, the same school the boys attended.

On June 26, 2012, Judge Deana H. McDonald admonished the parties to the case that they must follow the statutes and laws regarding privacy and confidentiality of juvenile proceedings in the Commonwealth of Kentucky. The state of Kentucky is one of 11 states which seal court cases if the accused is under 18 years of age. Then Judge McDonald took an extra step, indicating that the crime itself should not be discussed and that no one should "speak about the incident to anyone for any reason," she said, according to court files. "No one is to talk or type anything." This meant that Dietrich (the 16-year-old female victim) was not permitted to speak about the case, the charges, the facts and allegations therein, and the identities of the defendants.

== Statements by victim protesting leniency ==
Dietrich stated that she felt her concerns were not properly addressed and that the proposed deal was too lenient. Later that evening, she announced the names of the defendants on Twitter, tweeting "Will Frey and Austin Zehnder sexually assaulted me," and "There you go, lock me up. I'm not protecting anyone that made my life a living hell."

The primary judge on the case, Angela McCormick Bisig, was away the day the controversial order of silence was issued by Judge McDonald. In 2013 Judge Bisig, then a circuit-court judge, went on record acknowledging Dietrich should have been allowed to discuss the crime itself, "We cannot tell a young crime victim that they cannot tell their personal story."

Attorneys for the boys attempted to have Dietrich held in contempt for publishing their names, but the motion was subsequently dropped. Notwithstanding Judge McDonald's admonitions forbidding anyone "talk or type anything", on August 28, 2012, Judge Bisig stated in her ruling that on July 30, 2012 "Judge McDonald ruled that there was no "gag order" in place and that her admonishment had been to comply with the law of confidentiality required by Kentucky Statutes."

In an affidavit, Dietrich also stated that Paul Richwalsky, the chief prosecutor in the juvenile court division, said she should "get over it and see a therapist. ... The jail was for 'real' rapists, murderers and robbers". Richwalsky denied the allegation and stated in an affidavit "Perhaps it is not so much she is trying to intentionally mislead and deceive this court, but rather the delusional assertions made in her affidavit are merely the byproduct of what she would like to believe happened and not what in actuality took place."

== Sentencing and revision of plea deal ==
During sentencing, Judge Angela Bisig emphasized the "serious nature" of the crime. She removed a provision of the plea deal that would have expunged the defendants' records when they reach age of 19 1/2. She also ordered that their community service be served at a charity that deals with women's issues.

Terms of the sentences require supervision by the state's juvenile justice department, offender treatment and performance of 50 hours of community service at a women's facility. After three years of good behavior the two felony charges may be amended down to misdemeanors and after five years the boys may request that the convictions be expunged.

== Subsequent activities ==
Dietrich was reportedly satisfied with the revised punishment. In March 2013, she took an active and public role in advocating legislation in the Kentucky legislature, as reported by The Courier-Journal:

[S]he hopes that a law would prevent what happened to her from happening to anyone else. She said perhaps the law will make it clear to everyone that it is the victim's right to talk about what happened.

At the same time, Dietrich indicated that such a state law is not absolutely necessary, given the protections that she believes are already afforded by the First Amendment to the United States Constitution. First Amendment expert Eugene Volokh has commented about this Louisville case, saying that a pertinent U.S. Supreme Court precedent on this subject is Oklahoma Publishing v. District Court, 430 U.S. 308 (1977). "An order barring a victim from revealing the names of her assailants is, I think, clearly unconstitutional, even when the assailants are juveniles. Oklahoma Publishing Co. v. District Court (1977) expressly rejected the notion that courts or legislatures may bar the publication of the names of juvenile offenders; that case involved a newspaper's publishing the name of the juvenile offender, which it learned from a court hearing, but the rationale applies at least as strongly to a person's publishing a name that she learned from the attack itself."

== See also ==
- Rape in the United States
- Spur Posse
- Steubenville High School rape case
- Torrington High School rape cases
- Vanderbilt rape case
- Glen Ridge rape
- Audrie & Daisy
  - Audrie Pott
  - Daisy Coleman
- Suicide of Rehtaeh Parsons
- Baylor University sexual assault scandal
- La Salle University basketball scandal
