= Maxine Tynes =

Canadian poet (1949–2011)

- Tynes in 1987
- Born: 30 June 1949; Dartmouth, Nova Scotia
- Died: 12 September 2011 (aged 62)
- Education: Dalhousie University
- Occupations: Poet, educator

Maxine Nellie Tynes (30 June 1949 – 12 September 2011) was a Canadian poet, writer, and educator.

== Early life and education ==
A descendent of Black Loyalists, Tynes was born on 30 June 1949 and raised in Dartmouth, Nova Scotia. She contracted polio at age 4, which left her right leg paralyzed. Unable to attend school for several years due to her illness, Tynes was taught to read and write by her mother Ada Maxwell Tynes, a homemaker. Her father, Joseph (Joe) Tynes, was a shipyard worker.

Tynes began writing poetry during her teenage years. Her work explored themes of race, social inequality, war, disability, and feminism.

After graduating from Dartmouth High School, Tynes studied at Dalhousie University, where she won the Dennis Memorial Poetry Prize. She graduated with an education degree in 1975.

== Career ==
Tynes taught English at the former Graham Creighton High School in Cherry Brook; and at Cole Harbour District High School and Auburn Drive High School in Forest Hills, just outside Dartmouth; for 31 years. In 1993, she received a medal from the Governor General for excellence in teaching.

She was the first African-Canadian woman to sit on the Dalhousie University board of governors, where she served from 1986 to 1994.

Tynes' first book of poetry, Borrowed Beauty, was published in 1987 and won the Milton Acorn People's Poetry Award. She went on to publish three other poetry anthologies. Tynes also contributed to various other Maritimes publications as well as CBC Radio.

== Publications ==
Tynes wrote four poetry anthologies, all published by Pottersfield Press of Lawrencetown.

- Borrowed Beauty (1987)
- Woman Talking Woman (1990)
- Save the World For Me (1991) – children's book
- The Door of My Heart (1993)

== Death ==
Tynes died of complications of polio on 12 September 2011 at age 62.

== Honours ==
A room in the Alderney Gate Public Library in downtown Dartmouth was formally named The Maxine Tynes Room on 14 June 1990, and features a portrait of Tynes by artist Rosemary McDonald. The same portrait appears on the cover of Woman Talking Woman.

In 1992, Tynes was awarded an honorary Doctor of Humane Letters from Mount Saint Vincent University in Halifax.

In 2021, the Writers' Federation of Nova Scotia named its poetry award the Maxine Tynes Nova Scotia Poetry Award.
