= Steubenville High School rape case =

2012 sex crime in Steubenville, Ohio, United States

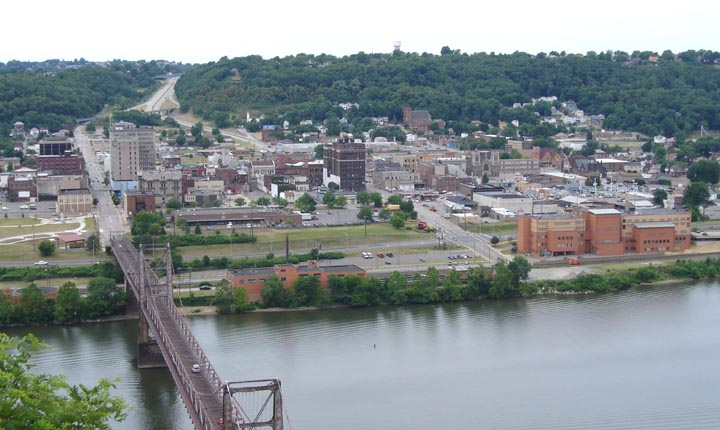
Steubenville High School, pictured in 2007

The Steubenville High School rape occurred in Steubenville, Ohio, on the night of August 11, 2012, when a high school girl, incapacitated by alcohol, was publicly and repeatedly sexually assaulted by her peers, several of whom documented the acts on social media. The victim was transported, undressed, photographed, and sexually assaulted. She was also penetrated vaginally by other students' fingers (digital penetration), an act defined as rape under Ohio law.

The callous attitude of the assailants was documented on Facebook, Twitter, text messages, and cell phone recordings of the acts. The crime and ensuing legal proceedings generated considerable controversy and galvanized a national conversation about rape and rape culture. Two students and high school football players, Ma'lik Richmond and Trent Mays, both 16 at the time of the crime, were convicted in juvenile court for the rape of a minor. Additionally, three other adults were indicted for obstructing the investigation into the rape, while Steubenville's superintendent of schools was charged with hindering the investigation into a rape that took place earlier in 2012.

== Crime ==
In the early morning hours of August 12, 2012, during a neighbor end-of-summer party attended by dozens of students from several high schools in the area, two Steubenville High School football players, Trent Mays and Ma'lik Richmond, repeatedly raped a 16-year-old girl from Weirton, West Virginia while she was blackout drunk over a period of six hours.

The two transported the girl, who was mostly unconscious, between various house parties, at one point assaulting her in the back of a car they were riding in, eventually ending up in a basement where they stripped her clothes, tried to make her perform oral sex, and took photos of her naked.

The victim would later testify in court that she had no memory of any of the events, except for a brief episode of vomiting in the street; one witness said "she remained there alone for several minutes with her top off." She woke up the next morning naked in a basement living room with Mays, Richmond, and another teenage boy, and was unable to find her underwear, flip-flops, phone and earrings.

In a photograph posted on Instagram by Steubenville High football player Cody Saltsman, the victim was shown looking unresponsive, being carried by two by her wrists and ankles. A Steubenville graduate, who was then attending Ohio State University, Michael Nodianos, responded with a fictional monologue of the event, tweeting "Some people deserve to be peed on", which was retweeted later by several people, including Mays.

In a 12-minute video later posted to YouTube, Nodianos and others talked about what they think is going to happen with Jane Doe, with Nodianos joking that "they raped her quicker than Mike Tyson raped that one girl" and "They peed on her. That's how you know she's dead, because someone pissed on her". In one text, Mays described the victim as "like a dead body" and "deader than Caylee Anthony" and in another he told the victim that a photo of her lying naked in a basement had been taken by him. In a text message to a friend afterwards, he said "I shoulda raped her now that everybody thinks I did", but "she wasn't awake enough".

In the days following the rape, Mays "seemed to try to orchestrate a cover-up," asking friends to lie for him, telling one, "Just say she came to your house and passed out'" and pleading with the victim not to press charges.

In a text message to the victim, Mays "admitted to the girl that he had taken the picture, already circulated among other students, of her lying naked in a basement with what he told her was his semen on her body", but claimed their encounter was consensual and tried to convince her that he had taken care of her while she was drunk. In one text he told her "I’m going to get in trouble for something I should be getting thanked for taking care of you." In another exchange, she told Mays "It’s on YouTube. I’m not stupid. Stop texting me."

Mays and Richmond were arrested August 22, about a week after the girl's parents had reported the incident to the police.

== Public reaction ==
The case garnered nationwide attention after it was prominently covered in The New York Times, in part for the role of social media had played in its development. Several individuals publicized the event using Twitter, YouTube, Instagram, and text messages. Video and photo evidence reveal that the girl was sexually assaulted over the course of several hours. The video and photo evidence showed her to be unconscious. Some members of the community blamed the girl for the rape and blamed her for casting a negative light on the football team and town. Nodianos, a scholarship student at Ohio State at the time news of the rape broke, received numerous threats for the comments he made, as did his family in Steubenville, and was subsequently forced to drop out of Ohio State.

Criticism has also been placed upon media outlets themselves, especially CNN. During the course of the delinquent verdict on March 17, 2013, CNN's Poppy Harlow stated that it was "incredibly difficult, even for an outsider like me, to watch what happened as these two young men that had such promising futures, star football players, very good students, literally watched as they believed their lives fell apart ... when that sentence came down, [Ma'lik] collapsed in the arms of his attorney. ... He said to him, 'My life is over. No one is going to want me now'". Candy Crowley and Paul Callan were also criticized for their lack of focus on the victim and their sympathy for the rapists.

In early broadcasts on March 17, 2013, CNN, Fox News, and MSNBC aired unedited footage that revealed the first name of the rape victim during one of the students' post-conviction statements after the guilty disposition was announced. This practice is against the Associated Press guidelines for coverage. These media outlets redacted the name in subsequent broadcasts. Her first name also appeared temporarily in documents leaked by Anonymous.

Congressman Bill Johnson of Ohio's 6th congressional district, which includes Steubenville, issued a statement on January 7, 2013. In the statement, Johnson said, "As the father of two daughters and grandfather of four granddaughters, had something like what is being alleged here have happened to one of my loved ones, I would be demanding justice to the fullest extent of the law". He stated he was in contact with State Attorney General Mike DeWine about the incident, and was confident that the state and local authorities were competently handling the case. On March 17, after the verdict he stated: "This has been a tragic ordeal. Lives have been forever changed because of the reprehensible acts committed by the young men involved. Now that they've been held accountable in court, I'm hopeful that the Steubenville community will begin the difficult process of healing".

=== Leaked evidence ===
On December 24, 2012, following national newspaper coverage, the hacker collective Anonymous and other hackers threatened to reveal the names of other unindicted alleged participants. In December 2012, KnightSec, an offshoot of Anonymous, hacked an unaffiliated website, posting a demand for an apology by school officials and local authorities, who had allegedly covered up the incident in order to protect the athletes and school's program. KnightSec followed up their December hack on January 1, 2013, posting a video featuring the "self-proclaimed 'rape crew' from the night of the attack, making jokes about what had happened". There are allegations that more people participated in the crime. One of the hackers was later indicted under the federal Computer Fraud and Abuse Act. Deric Lostutter, who donned a Guy Fawkes mask and was interviewed by CNN, was later raided by the FBI with a warrant targeting his involvement in the hacking of a site, even though somebody else acknowledged being responsible for the hacking.

=== Saltsman v. Goddard ===
Saltsman v. Goddard concerned an effort by the parents of Cody Saltsman, a teenage boy from Steubenville, to stop blogger Alexandria Goddard's website from publishing allegedly defamatory posts about their son. The parents sued Goddard and a dozen anonymous posters in October 2012; a legal blogger labeled it a SLAPP suit. The lawsuit asked for an injunction against the blogger, a public apology stating that the boy was not involved in the rape and $25,000 in damages. Goddard was defended in the suit by First Amendment lawyer Marc Randazza. Most of the specific statements outlined in the Saltsmans' lawsuit did not rise to the level of defamation as alleged. The majority of local anonymous posters named in the lawsuit via their online nametag perceived this lawsuit as merely an avenue to learn their identity. The case was dismissed with prejudice in December 2012 after Goddard agreed to post a statement that the boy was remorseful about his role in the aftermath of the Steubenville High School rape case.

== Trial and sentencing ==
Ohio investigators confiscated and analyzed 15 cellphones and two tablets, collecting hundreds of text messages from dozens of students, and interviewed almost 60 people, including students, coaches, school officials and parents.

The evidence presented in court mainly consisted of hundreds of text messages and cellphone pictures that had been taken by more than a dozen people at the parties and afterwards traded with other students and posted to social media sites such as Twitter, Facebook, and YouTube, and which were described by the judge as "profane and ugly".

On March 17, 2013, Judge Thomas Lipps tried Mays and Richmond as juveniles and adjudicated them "delinquent beyond reasonable doubt", the juvenile equivalent of a guilty verdict, finding that they had used their fingers to digitally penetrate the victim's vagina and that it was impossible for the incapacitated girl to have given consent. Each defendant received a mandated minimum sentence, with the possibility of remaining in juvenile detention until age 21. The judge set a minimum sentence of one year for Richmond, who was found guilty of penetrating the girl while she was unconscious. Mays, who was found guilty of penetrating the girl while she was unconscious and disseminating pornographic pictures of her, was given a minimum sentence of two years. Because the girl was a minor, Mays was charged with and convicted of the dissemination of child pornography, which is the reason for his additional year in juvenile detention. Initially, it was reported that whether or not Mays and Richmond will be added to the sex offender registry would depend on a future hearing to evaluate their behavior once they had turned 21. However, both were classified "Tier II" (medium) offenders. Ma'lik Richmond was released from detention on January 5, 2014. Trent Mays was released in January 2015. As of 2018, it was reported that Mays was not listed on the sex offender registry, and that Mays had been accepted to play football for Central State University, while Richmond played for Youngstown State, following a decision to remove him from the team in response to a public petition, and a lawsuit to overturn that decision.

== Charges against adults ==
The nature of the case led to accusations that coaches and school officials knew about the rape and failed to report it. For example, several texts entered into evidence during the trial implied that Steubenville head coach Reno Saccoccia was trying to cover for the players, which led to nationwide outrage after he received a new contract as the district's administrative services director. In response, shortly after the sentences were handed down, then Ohio Attorney General Mike DeWine announced he would empanel a special grand jury to determine whether other crimes were committed—specifically, whether coaches and other school officials failed to report the rape even though Ohio law makes them mandated reporters.

The panel began meeting in April 2013. On October 8, 2013, the grand jury returned the first indictment of an adult in the case. William Rhinaman, the IT director for Steubenville City Schools, was charged with one count each of tampering with evidence, obstruction of justice, obstruction of a public official and grand jury perjury. In February 2015, Rhinaman, under a deal reached with prosecutors, pleaded guilty to one count of obstructing official business. He was sentenced to 90 days in jail, 80 days of which were suspended provided he completes one year of community control.

On November 25, 2013, DeWine announced a second round of indictments. Another alleged rape of a 14-year-old girl occurring in April 2012 had come to light, leading to grand jury charges. The highest-profile indictment in relation to this earlier alleged rape was that of Steubenville City Schools superintendent Michael McVey, who was charged with obstructing justice, tampering with evidence, obstructing official business and falsification. In 2015, McVey agreed to resign from his post in exchange for not facing charges, never seek employment in Steubenville education again and avoid contact with anyone involved in the investigation or case. Three other adults were also indicted. An elementary school principal and a strength coach were charged with failing to report possible child abuse. Charges against the principal were unrelated to the August rape case and were dismissed before the case went to trial. A former volunteer coach faces several misdemeanor charges, including making false statements and contributing to underage alcohol consumption. Other school employees were reinstated after an investigation into the indictments.

== In culture ==
The song "Plato's Tripartite" performed by Canadian metal band Protest the Hero from their album Volition was written directly referencing this case, providing a sarcastic commentary on how the media and public twisted their sympathy to those who performed the rape, and ostracized the victim instead.

The 2014 Lifetime channel movie The Assault was loosely based on this incident.

Los Angeles-based artist Andrea Bowers exhibited an art installation with the tweets the football players sent out the night of the rape at Pomona College Museum of Art January 21 to April 13, 2014, and Pitzer College Art Galleries from January 21 to March 28, 2014 in Claremont, California. Bowers grew up in a small town in Ohio with values similar to those in Steubenville, where, she says, "most of the young men were never told 'No' and were culturally given the right to do whatever they wanted", something that she feels "needs to change". She attended the trial to do the research necessary for the artwork.

Brad Pitt and partners Plan B Entertainment production company bought the rights of the Rolling Stone article about Deric Lostutter's involvement in the case.

Roll Red Roll is an 80-minute documentary movie about the rape. It is directed by Nancy Schwartzman, and edited by Christopher White. The film provides a "public example of the breadth of rape culture". A companion book of the same title, co-authored by Schwartzman and Nora Zelevansky, was published by Hachette Book Group in 2022.

== See also ==
- Sexual assault of Savannah Dietrich (Louisville, Kentucky)
- Suicide of Rehtaeh Parsons (Cole Harbour District High School, Nova Scotia)
- Suicide of Audrie Pott (Saratoga High School, California)
- Torrington High School rape case (Torrington, Connecticut)
- Glen Ridge rape (Glen Ridge High School, New Jersey)
- Post-assault treatment of sexual assault victims
- Spur Posse
- Vanderbilt rape case
