= Miles Feinstein =

American lawyer (1941–2023)

- Born: Miles Roger Feinstein; June 25, 1941; Camden, New Jersey, U.S.
- Died: July 22, 2023 (aged 82); Morristown, New Jersey, U.S.
- Education: Rutgers University (A.B.) 1963; Duke University Law School (J.D.) 1966
- Occupation: Criminal defense attorney
- Website: www.feinsteincriminallaw.com

Miles Feinstein (June 25, 1941 – July 22, 2023) was an American criminal law defense attorney, and legal commentator, who tried many high profile criminal cases. Miles Feinstein was called the "top Passaic County criminal defense lawyer" by the local news media. He has been practicing law in high-profile criminal cases in both New Jersey state and federal courts since 1966. He was admitted to practice in the U.S. District of New Jersey, 1967, the U.S. Court of Appeals 3rd Circuit, 1968 and the U.S Court of Appeals 2nd circuit, 1981.

== Notable cases ==
=== Cases ===
Feinstein represented Giuseppe "Juicy Joe" Giudice of the Real Housewives of New Jersey in his false driver's license case.

Feinstein also represented Ausar Walcott, a former NFL linebacker with the Cleveland Browns, who was charged with attempted murder due to an incident in June 2013 at a bar in Passaic, New Jersey.

=== Murder acquittals ===
Feinstein tried numerous homicide trials during his career of over forty-five years. The acquittals include State v. Paul Kavanaugh [not guilty of capital murder], State v. John DeGroot [not guilty of capital murder], and State v. Vidovic [on cross-examination, star witness against Feinstein's client admitted that he, the witness, committed the murder and the defendant was acquitted].

Feinstein represented a key recanting witness which led to the reversal of a murder conviction in the case of Rubin "Hurricane" Carter.

=== Glen Ridge Rape ===
Feinstein represented Kyle Scherzer in the appeal of the notorious Glen Ridge High School rape case, which received national attention and spawned a book "Our Guys" by Bernard Lefkowitz, a television movie Our Guys, Outrage in Glen Ridge, along with many newspaper, magazine and law review articles.

=== Organized crime ===
Feinstein represented many high-profile organized crime defendants for over forty-five years, including Joseph "Scoops" Licata (one of the defendants in the United States v. Anthony Accetturo case), the longest federal trial in United States history, depicted in the Vin Diesel film Find Me Guilty and in the Book, The Boys From New Jersey; reputed organized crime figures Nicodemo Scarfo, Genovese Family Capo regime Angelo Prisco, and Anthony DeVingo, a hit man for the Genovese Mob in the 1970s and 80s, said to be the inspiration for Paulie Walnuts in The Sopranos.

== Legal commentary ==
Feinstein appeared as a legal commentator on television (Court TV; now TruTV) and was often quoted as an expert on criminal law in many publications.

Feinstein was a frequent lecturer in continuing education courses for attorneys.

Feinstein was named to New Jersey Super Lawyers for each year since its inception.

== Death ==
Feinstein died of cancer at Morristown Medical Center on July 22, 2023, at the age of 82.
