= Sunset Acres (disambiguation) =

Sunset Acres is a suburb of Johannesburg, South Africa.

Sunset Acres may also refer to:

- Sunset Acres, Alberta, an unincorporated community in Canada
- Sunset Acres, Nova Scotia, a neighborhood of Westphal in Canada
- Sunset Acres, Texas, a census-designated place in the United States
