= Leslie Faber =

Leslie Faber may refer to:

- Leslie Faber (actor), English actor (1879–1929)
- A character in a dramatisation of the Glen Ridge rape case
