= Post-assault treatment of sexual assault victims =

Scrutiny and mistreatment of victims of sexual violence

After a sexual assault or rape, victims are often subjected to scrutiny and mistreatment. Victims who decide to report their assaults to law enforcement undergo medical examinations and are interviewed by police. If there is a criminal trial, victims suffer a loss of privacy, and their credibility may be challenged. Victims may also become the target of slut-shaming, abuse, social stigmatization, sexual slurs and cyberbullying. These factors, contributing to a rape culture, are among some of the reasons that may contribute up to 80% of all rapes going unreported in the U.S., according to a 2016 study done by the U.S. Department of Justice.

Various laws have been created with a motive to protect victims. During criminal proceedings, publication bans and rape shield laws protect victims from excessive public scrutiny. Laws may also prohibit defense lawyers from obtaining a victim's medical, psychiatric or therapeutic records. Statutory rape laws set the age of legal consent for sexual activity and prohibits perpetrators from alleging the victim consented to the activity. Victims in some jurisdictions can seek damages from police and institutions if warnings were not issued. Numerous victims' rights groups operate to improve the treatment of victims.

== Examination and investigation of victim ==
=== Medical examination and "rape kits" ===
Following a rape, a victim may seek medical care and obtain a medical examination that obtains and preserves physical evidence. Examiners may collect fingernail scrapings and pluck head and pubic hairs. If the facility has the means the examiner will also take photographs of genital injuries. A 'rape kit' contains the items used by medical personnel for gathering and preserving physical evidence.

Many "rape kits" are untested because they are never submitted to crime labs or because crime labs have insufficient resources to test all of the submitted kits. In the United States, national surveys of law enforcement agencies suggest there may be upwards of 200,000 untested rape kits in 2015.

The Survivors' Bill of Rights Act of 2016 enacted by the United States federal government gives victims the right to:

- request the preservation of sexual assault evidence collection kit or its probative contents;
- have the sexual assault evidence collection kit preserved, without charge, for the duration of the maximum applicable statute of limitations or 20 years, whichever is shorter; and
- be informed of any result of a sexual assault evidence collection kit, including a DNA profile match, toxicology report, or other information collected as part of a medical forensic examination, if the disclosure would not impede or compromise an ongoing investigation.

In 2019, the Debbie Smith Reauthorization Act of 2019 was enacted to provide funding to help eliminate backlogs in rape kit testing. More than 100,000 rape kits in the United States remain untested.

=== Acknowledgement of victim's courage by police ===
Police may acknowledge and thank victims for coming forward in sexual assault cases, noting that reporting assaults is incredibly difficult and takes a great deal of courage.

=== Interview by police ===
As part of police investigations, victims are interviewed by police. The interview is usually recorded, and a transcript may be prepared.

If police believe the reported victim is making a false accusation of rape, they may interrogate that person as a suspect rather than a victim. In some cases, harsh questioning and social stigmatization has caused even actual victims of rape to recant and then be charged with making a false report.

=== Treatment of Victims during Court hearings ===
A study done in Australia by the Crime Statistics Agency revealed that most reports of sexual assault to the Police do not make it past the initial stage, with "police identifying an offender for half of incidents reported to them and charging an offender for one in four".

If rape accusations reported to the police head to trial, further questioning and public scrutiny may impact on a victim's recovery and compound their trauma. Typically, the cross-examination will scrutinize the “reliability of the witness, the plausibility of an alleged assault or the credibility or consistency of evidence”.

Australian Criminologist Dr. Andy Kaladelfos says that the treatment of sexual assault survivors during trials is worse than it was during the 1950s in Australia. Dr. Kaladelfos says this treatment is one of the reasons many drop their cases before or during the trial, with many describing the experience akin to reliving the experience or “another rape”. Victims are asked to describe in detail the experience, as well as personal information such as what clothes they were wearing, and other unrelated information not directly involved in the incident, such as their background and relationship history. Questions like these are typically only directed at the victims, and can confuse, mislead, or intimidate victims, Dr. Kaladelfos says. The length of defendant cross-examination questioning has risen by approximately 30% since the 1950s - in the case of child case examinations, they are now three times as long. He cites one child victim who was asked 1,000 questions during a cross-examination.

=== Confidentiality, harassment, smear campaigns and silencing ===
In Canada, pursuant to sections 278.1 to 278.91 of the Criminal Code defence counsel are not allowed to obtain a victim's medical, psychiatric or therapeutic records . The prohibition was found to be constitutional by the Supreme Court of Canada even though it limited the accused ability to provide a full answer and defence; see R. v Mills.

An accused may hire a private investigator to investigate and harass a victim. For example, according to the complaint in the civil lawsuit against Penn State University, Nate Parker hired a private investigator to investigate and harass an 18-year-old student. The student alleged she was raped by Parker and another student. The harassment included exposing the victim's identity by posting enlarged photos of the victim around the university campus. The lawsuit against Penn State was settled for $17,500. (Parker was found not guilty of the rape charges. The student attempted suicide three months after the assault and died by suicide at age 30.)

Institutions may attempt to cover up sexual abuse, as seen in the Catholic Church sexual abuse cases. The movie Spotlight deals with the coverup of sexual abuse by Catholic priests.

Dennis Hastert allegedly promised to pay $5 million to his victim in exchange for agreeing not to discuss the sexual assaults he committed.

Authorities may fail to investigate allegations of sexual assault because the victims are perceived to be unreliable witnesses. The BBC One miniseries Three Girls deals with the systematic sexual abuse of young girls by a group of older Asian men in Rochdale. Authorities were slow to respond even though more than 100 referrals were made to the police and social services.

Harvey Weinstein dispatched defense lawyers and publicists to undermine the credibility of his accusers.

== Campus sexual assault victims ==
In the United States, various legislation, government agencies, and initiatives have been created to deal with campus sexual assault. These include:

- White House Task Force to Protect Students from Sexual Assault
- Title IX requires schools receiving federal funds to protect students from gender-based violence and harassment—including sexual assault. The Office for Civil Rights investigates Title IX sexual violence complaints.
- The Campus Accountability and Safety Act (CASA) is a United States bill to reform the sexual assault investigation process and protect victims. CASA includes a requirement that colleges and universities publish statistics relating to crime on their campuses.
- The Safe Campus Act is proposed U.S. legislation that would require schools to report allegations of sexual assault to law enforcement, but only if the victim consents. However, if the victim does not consent the statute prohibits schools from initiating their own internal disciplinary procedures.

The Hunting Ground is a critically acclaimed American documentary film about the incidence of sexual assault on college campuses in the United States. Its creators say college administrations are failing to respond adequately to claims of sexual assault, while its critics have countered that the film was based on misleading statistics and biased against the alleged perpetrator.

== Sexual assault victims in the military ==
Sexual assault in the military is more prevalent than outside of the military, and it is frequently underreported. In the United States, Sexual Assault Prevention Response is a training program designated to educate military service members and provide support and treatment to service members and their families. Individuals are assigned to an advocate, who assists them with the different treatment options that are available to them and educates them about their rights.

In 2019 Department of Defense reported a 50 per cent increase in assaults on military women over a two-year period. The department recognized a need for better training and identification of repeat offenders, however throwing money at the problem has not produced results. Legislative efforts to create an independent prosecutor were opposed by military lobbyists concerned that it would erode command authority. Without independent prosecutors most punishment and disciplining is left to the discretion of commanders.

== Sexual assault of prisoners ==
The Prison Rape Elimination Act is United States legislation enacted for the purpose of preventing sexual assaults in U.S. prisons. The legislation requires reporting and information gathering.

== Publication bans, duty to warn and censorship ==
=== Bans on publishing the victim's name ===
In the United States, laws prohibiting the publication of a victim's name have been found to be unconstitutional and struck down. In Cox Broadcasting Corp. v. Cohn 420 U.S. 469 (1975), the U.S. Supreme Court ruled a Georgia statute that imposed civil liability on media for publishing a rape victim's name was unconstitutional. The Court stated: "the First and Fourteenth Amendments command nothing less than that the States may not impose sanctions on the publication of truthful information contained in official court records open to public inspection." Also see Florida Star v. B. J. F., 491 U.S. 524 (1989) and State of Florida v. Globe Communications Corp., 648 So.2d 110 (Fla. 1994).

In Canada, the Canadian Press generally does not publish the names of alleged sexual assault victims without their consent. In addition, a court order may operate to prohibit publication. Pursuant to paragraph 486.4(1)(a) of the Criminal Code, the court may make an order "directing that any information that could identify the complainant or a witness" not be published, broadcast or transmitted for any sexual offences. The victim has the option of waiving the publication ban.

=== Bans on publishing names of accused juveniles ===
In cases where the accused is under 18 years of age, the court may impose a publication ban to protect the privacy of the offender.

After 17-year-old Savannah Dietrich pursued a case against two teenage boys for sexual assault, the court initially prohibited anyone from discussing the case. Dietrich was threatened by the accused to be found in contempt when she published the names of the perpetrators on social media, but the court then clarified that no "gag order" was in place.

In Canada, the section 110 of the Youth Criminal Justice Act generally prohibits the publication of the name of the offender if the offender was under the age of 18 at the time of the offence.

=== Duty to warn the public ===
The police, colleges and universities may be required to warn the public that a sexual assault has occurred. Women should be warned of the risk they face and have the opportunity to take any specific measures to protect themselves from future attacks.

Victims of sexual assault may sue for damages if warnings are not issued. In 1998, a sexual assault victim successfully sued the Toronto police for their failure to warn her that a serial rapist was active in her neighbourhood. The complainant in the Nate Parker case sued Pennsylvania State University for violating her Title IX rights.

In the United States, the Clery Act imposes fines on colleges and universities that fail to warn students of criminal activity on or near campuses. The law is named after Jeanne Clery, a 19-year-old Lehigh University student who was raped and murdered in her campus hall of residence in 1986. In relation to the Jerry Sandusky sexual abuse scandal, U.S. federal investigators are seeking to fine Penn State University $2.4 million for failing to warn of threats to the campus.

=== Censorship ===
- Censorship by travel websites - TripAdvisor apologized for repeatedly deleting forum posts about a resort where the victim had been raped by a security guard.
- Censorship because of perceived incitement to violence against migrants - The 2026 movie Citizen Vigilante was effectively banned from wide distribution in Germany for promoting vigilantism. As reported in Variety, the film "was inspired by a notorious case in Hamburg in 2016, when a group of teenagers gang-raped a 14-year-old girl and left her for dead, only for the perpetrators to walk free with suspended sentences."

=== Self-censorship ===
Self-censorship is when publications or people censor themselves in order to withhold information to protect their image or avoid receiving backlash. Some instances include:

- Self-censorship because subject is distasteful – Newspapers may self-censor, choosing not to publish material about a sexual assault on the grounds that the subject is distasteful. For example, there were complaints when The Des Moines Register published stories about the rape of Nancy Ziegenmeyer. One reader complained: "The disgusting and degrading details of Nancy Ziegenmeyer's rape have no place in a family newspaper the caliber of The Register." (Said reader, however, conceded: ''Unfortunately, we have to face such violent crimes at a very personal level before we are aroused to action and commitment.")
- Self-censorship because of ethnicity of the accused – Publication of information regarding sexual assaults may be suppressed because of fears of being thought racist. A 2006 report regarding the child sexual assaults in Rotherham, England, stated: "It is believed by a number of workers that one of the difficulties that prevent this issue [child sexual exploitation] being dealt with effectively is the ethnicity of the main perpetrators." With respect to the Rochdale child sex abuse ring, it was suggested that police and social work departments failed to act when details of the gang emerged for fear of appearing racist, and vulnerable white teenagers being groomed by Pakistani men were ignored.
- Self-censorship because "women would become hysterical" – In 1998, the Toronto police did not issue warnings regarding a serial rapist "because women would become hysterical or panic" and "the rapist would flee and the investigation would be compromised". The Toronto police were ultimately found liable for damages for failing to issue warnings.
- Self-censorship to avoid harming international relations – Korea has agreed to refrain from criticising Japan over the issue of comfort women. During World War II, many Korean women were forced to be the sex slaves of members of the Japanese military.
- Self-censorship to avoid deportation and intimidation using "rape trees" – Sexual assaults of illegal immigrants are rarely reported as the victims fear they may be deported after coming forward. Women often seek out birth control methods to prevent pregnancy from anticipated sexual assaults.

Rape trees are trees or bushes that mark where sexual assaults have occurred by arranging the victim's undergarments on or around the trees branches or on the ground. "Rape trees" are commonly and increasingly found along the United States and Mexico border. The rape trees serve to intimidate illegal immigrants by suggesting the perpetrators are able to commit acts of violence with impunity.

== Financial costs ==
Victims may incur various financial costs because of the sexual assault; for example, costs related to moving (to get away from the perpetrator), a new mattress, legal fees, lost wages, lost tuition fees, new clothing, therapy and medication.

In the province of Ontario, victims who are assaulted by a member of the College of Physicians and Surgeons of Ontario may qualify for financial help to see a therapist or counsellor.

== Conduct of legal proceedings ==
=== Statutes of limitations ===
A statute of limitations law may preclude a victim from pressing criminal charges if too many years have passed since the assault occurred. Limitations periods vary from jurisdiction to jurisdiction. For example, in Pennsylvania charges must be filed within 12 years of the assault.

=== Statutory rape ===
Statutory rape is sexual activity in which one of the individuals is below the age of consent. The age of consent is the age at which a young person is capable of consenting to sexual activity. These laws were enacted to recognize the inherent power imbalance between adults and children and that children are incapable of giving true consent to sexual acts with adults. The laws protect children from undue influence, persuasion and manipulation.

In 2016, the Government of Turkey proposed legislation that would overturn a man's conviction for child sex assault if they married their victim.

=== Consent ===
Defence counsel may argue the victim consented to the sexual activity. Determining if the victim consented can be problematic when the victim is intoxicated. A Nova Scotia court found there was no sexual assault because the prosecution could not prove the sexual activity was non-consensual. In that case, the sexual activity occurred in the back of a taxi cab between a taxi driver and an intoxicated customer.

In 2011, Cindy Gladue bled to death from an 11-centimetre cut in her vagina. At trial, the accused said Gladue died after a night of consensual, rough sex in an Edmonton motel. He was acquitted. The case is being appealed to the Supreme Court of Canada.

Discrepancies between the victim's statements to police and other evidence are grounds for the defence lawyer to impeach the credibility of the victim.

In investigations involving acquaintance or date rape, the electronic communications between the accused and the victim may be reviewed in order to determine if the victim consented to the sexual activity.

In People v. Jovanovic, the New York appeals court determined that emails from the alleged victim should be included in evidence and that the rape shield law did not apply. The alleged victim had written about her sadomasochistic interests and experiences.

In Canada, a defense lawyer may be allowed to obtain copies of the victim's e-mails and other private documents using a legal procedure called a third-party records application.

=== Rape shield laws ===
In Australia, Canada and the United States, the prior sexual history of the victim is generally not admissible as evidence during a criminal proceeding. These laws are referred to as rape shield laws.

In Canada, the constitutionality of the rape shield law was challenged on the grounds that it hampers a defendant's ability to present a defence. The law was found to be constitutional by the Supreme Court of Canada: see R v Darrach.

=== Misconduct by prosecutors ===
In the prosecution of Anthony Broadwater, the man convicted of assaulting Alice Sebold, the prosecutor lied to Sebold. Sebold was unable to identify Broadwater in a police lineup. In response, the prosecutor told her that Broadwater had come to the police lineup with a friend for the purpose of confusing her. Broadwater was convicted of the assault. Subsequently, attorneys working to exonerate Broadwater argued that the falsehood by the prosecutor had influenced Sebold's testimony. In her book Lucky, Sebold wrote that the prosecutor had coached her into changing her identification. Broadwater was exonerated in 2021.

=== Victim representation ===
In Canadian criminal proceedings, the Crown prosecutor does not act on behalf of the victim and is not the victim's lawyer.

29. Who represents the victim during the trial? Should I get a lawyer to ensure that my rights are met during the trial?
Crown counsel is not and can never function as the victim's lawyer. Although the Crown appears to be representing the interests of the victim, the Crown is the lawyer for the Queen and the government during the trial. In Canadian criminal cases, the harm is perceived to have been committed against the State. This is why cases are referred to as Regina v. Smith (or R. v. Smith), Regina being the Queen in Latin. The Crown is truly representing the society, of which you are a part.

=== Other ===
Sexual assault cases commonly involve multiple complainants. In these cases, the defence is likely to apply for separate trials for each offence. Joinder of multiple counts is only permitted in certain circumstances.

The decision to have separate trials is discretionary and is exercised in order to prevent prejudice to the defendant. The threshold question for holding a joint trial is whether or not each complainant's evidence will be admissible in respect of the charges involving the other complainants (that is, whether such evidence is 'cross-admissible'). Decisions to hold separate trials or refuse to admit relevant tendency or propensity evidence about a defendant's sexual behaviour can be seen as barriers to the successful prosecution of sex offences.

The sexual assault charges against Jian Ghomeshi involved multiple complainants and were dealt with in two separate proceedings. The second trial did not proceed after Ghomeshi agreed to issue an apology.

A victim of sexual assault may be subjected to speculative allegations of wrongdoing during cross-examination. For example, in R. v. Sofyan Boalag the defence lawyer asserted during the cross-examination that the victim was in fact asking for money in exchange for sex. In that case, the accused was convicted of 13 criminal offences involving six victims including multiple sexual assaults at knifepoint.

A victim's alcohol consumption at the time of the assault may undermine the victim's ability to remember the assault and his or her ability to provide credible testimony. As noted by Justice Zuker of the Ontario Court of Justice:

[414] What makes someone a perfect target in the context of alcohol-facilitated sexual assaults may make that person a poor witness in any ensuing proceedings due to his or her inability to remember part or all of what happened.

[415] One of the more challenging (and ever-present) issues to evaluate in sexual assault is the question of consent. Sexual assaults may involve alcohol consumption by one or both parties. Frequently, parties to an incident will have limited or no memory of the events in question, and the court will be required to obtain and evaluate information provided by other witnesses or other corroborating evidence.

During cross examination a victim's attire may be scrutinized and they may be accused of wearing revealing clothing. For example, a Toronto woman, who alleged she was sexually assaulted by three police officers after a party, was asked about her choice of wearing a top described as "really low cut with open sleeves" to a party mostly attended by "young men ... who would be drinking."

During cross-examination, a victim's criminal record may be noted in order to impeach their credibility. This tactic was unsuccessfully used in the trial of Daniel Holtzclaw.

== Post-assault social stigma, mistreatment and abuse ==
Victims of sexual assault are often subjected to social stigma. The victim may be subject to inappropriate post-assault behaviour or language by medical personnel or other organizations. Slut-shaming is the practice of blaming the victim for rape and other forms of sexual assault. It rests on the idea that sexual assault is caused (either in part or in full) by the woman wearing revealing clothing or acting in a sexually provocative manner, before refusing consent to sex, and thereby absolving the perpetrator of guilt.

In 2016, Indian politicians suggested that women's clothing choices could invite sexual assault. The comments were made after a number of women were molested at a New Year's Eve party in Bangalore. On the U.S. television program The View, Joy Behar referred to Bill Clinton's sexual assault accusers as "tramps"; Behar apologized for the sexual slur shortly afterwards.

The SlutWalk challenges the idea of explaining or excusing rape by referring to any aspect of a woman's appearance. The SlutWalk was created in response to comments by a Toronto Police officer who said: "I've been told I'm not supposed to say this—however, women should avoid dressing like sluts in order not to be victimized."

Sexual assault victims may stay away from work in order to avoid contact with the perpetrator. For example, Caroline Lamarre, an office worker who was sexually assaulted at work, has not returned to work in order to avoid contact with her assailant. The assailant was convicted of sexual assault.

Victims of sexual assault may be subjected to cyberbullying, as in the cases of the suicide of Audrie Pott, suicide of Rehtaeh Parsons and sexual assault of Savannah Dietrich. The Netflix documentary Audrie & Daisy is about two American high school students who were sexually assaulted by other students. At the time they were assaulted, Audrie Pott was 15 and Daisy Coleman was 14 years old. After the assaults, the victims and their families were subjected to abuse and cyberbullying.

The movie Taking Back My Life: The Nancy Ziegenmeyer Story is the true story of Nancy Ziegenmeyer, an Iowa resident who was raped in 1991. Her story was groundbreaking because she spoke openly about her experiences including her interactions with hospital staff, the police, prosecutors, the accused, and the criminal justice system. The Des Moines Register won the Pulitzer Prize for Public Service in 1991 for publishing the story of Ziegenmeyer's sexual assault. At the time the article was published it was unusual to publish the victim's name. Ziegenmeyer wrote a book, Taking Back My Life, to encourage women to seek help after they have been victimized.

The movie Share is a story about a 16-year-old girl who is sexually assaulted by boys from her high school and a video of the assault is circulated. She is incessantly harassed with anonymous text messages. The film premiered at the 2019 Sundance Film Festival.

The movie After the Hunt follows a student at Yale University who accuses a college professor of rape. Neither the student's nor teacher's version of events is presented as entirely credible. The film premiered at the 2025 Venice Film Festival.

Many celebrities have publicly supported and contributed to making a difference on how victims of sexual assault are perceived. Law & Order: SVU actress Mariska Hargitay has dedicated her life to making a difference in society's views. After gaining her fame playing Olivia Benson, she began receiving letters from fans disclosing their sexual assault stories. This inspired her to start her own nonprofit titled Joyful Heart Foundation. This organization provides resources and support to survivors, while trying to change society's response to assault, and end the violence altogether. Hargitay puts an emphasis on the fact that anyone can be targeted, and, no matter who they are, they deserve to be treated the same. She stated that while the United States has made progress, we need to not put blame on the victims, no matter the gender.

In many cultures, rape victims are at very high risk of suffering additional violence or threats of violence after the rape. These acts may be perpetrated by the rapist or by friends and relatives of the rapist as a way of preventing the victims from reporting the rape, of punishing them for reporting it, or of forcing them to withdraw the complaint. In addition, the relatives of the victim may threaten the victim as a punishment for "bringing shame" to the family. This is especially the case in cultures where female virginity is highly valued and considered mandatory before marriage; in extreme cases, rape victims are killed in honor killings.

In some countries, girls and women who are raped are forced by their families to marry their rapist. A marriage is arranged because victims are deemed to have their "reputation" tarnished. There is extreme social stigma related to being the victim of rape and the loss of virginity. Marriage is claimed to be advantageous for both the victim—who does not remain unmarried and does not lose social status—and of the rapist, who avoids punishment.

In 2012, the suicide of a 16-year-old Moroccan girl—who, after having been forced by her family to marry her rapist at the suggestion of the prosecutor, and who subsequently endured abuse by the rapist after they married—sparked protests from activists against the law which allows the rapist to marry the victim in order to escape criminal sanctions, and against this social practice which is common in Morocco.

In 2016, the government of Turkey introduced legislation which would overturn a man's conviction for child sex assault if he married his victim.

== Victim support ==
Victims often receive support from the community and other victims. For example, when Nancy Ziegenmeyer went public regarding her experience, "she was inundated with letters and phone calls of support, thanks and praise for her courage in going public. Many of the letters were from women who had been raped and had lived with their secrets, often telling no one, often blaming themselves."

== Victims' rights ==
In the United Kingdom, the Giving Victims a Voice report was published in response to allegations of sexual abuse made against English DJ and BBC Television presenter Jimmy Savile. The Director of Public Prosecutions described the report as marking a "watershed moment" and apologised for "shortcomings" in the handling of prior abuse claims. The report's publication resulted in some highlighting what could be systemic failure because of the number of complainants and institutions identified, but others criticised it for treating allegations as facts.

In the United States, the Crime Victims' Rights Act grants rights to victims including the right to be reasonably protected from the accused. Similarly, in Canada the Canadian Victims Bill of Rights provides rights to victims.

There are victims' rights groups. Rise is an NGO working to implement a bill of rights for sexual assault victims. The Rape, Abuse & Incest National Network (RAINN) is an American group which carries out programs to prevent sexual assault, help victims, and to ensure that rapists are brought to justice. The Victim Rights Law Center is an American non-profit organization that provides free legal services to victims of rape and sexual assault. In the United States, the Office on Violence Against Women works to administer justice and strengthen services for victims of domestic violence, dating violence, sexual assault, and stalking. In South Africa, People Opposing Women Abuse (POWA) is a women's rights organisation that provides services and engages in advocacy to promote women's rights and improve women's quality of life.

== See also ==
- Effects and aftermath of rape
- Laws regarding rape
- Rape investigation
