= Torrington High School rape cases =

Series of crimes in Connecticut, U.S.

The Torrington High School rape case refers to five separate rape cases in Torrington, Connecticut, United States, involving six former Torrington High School football players and two other Torrington teenagers.

In a 2013 case, Joan Toribio and Edgar Gonzalez, both 18-year-old former football players from Torrington High School, were convicted in the sexual assault of two 13-year-old girls in Torrington, Connecticut. Joan Toribio was sentenced to nine months in prison. Edgar Gonzalez was sentenced to six years in prison.

In a 2011 case, Kenuel Weaver-Hunt, 17, and Dylan Rodriguez, 16, pleaded guilty to charges of risk of injury to a minor with illicit sexual contact, a class "D" felony. Both were sentenced to five years in prison, suspended after four months served. Alec Berkemeier, 16, was charged with second-degree sexual assault and risk of injury to a minor with illicit sexual contact, but reached a deal with the prosecutors that included a provision to seal the records of the case.

== Controversy ==
Torrington High School gained notoriety for its students' victim blaming cyberbullying of the two 13-year-old girls through social media. The Register Citizen, a local newspaper, published images of Twitter posts that defended the accused and attacked the victims. A Houston-based law firm that specializes in defense of those accused of sex crimes claimed a possible failure in responsibility on the part of parents and teachers to make students aware of the legal implications of their actions.

== See also ==
- Audrie & Daisy, 2016 film
- Sexual assault of Savannah Dietrich
- Steubenville High School rape case
- Suicide of Rehtaeh Parsons (Cole Harbour District High School)
- Suicide of Audrie Pott (Saratoga High School)
- Vanderbilt rape case
