= Lakewood High School (California) =

Location
- 4400 Briercrest Avenue; Lakewood, California 90713; United States; 33°50′18″N 118°7′22″W

Information
- Funding type: Public
- Motto: Today's lancers, Tomorrow's leaders.
- Established: 1957
- School district: Long Beach Unified School District
- Superintendent: Jill Baker
- Principal: Mona Merlo
- Teaching staff: 115.47 (FTE)
- Grades: 9th - 12th
- Enrollment: 2,580 (2023-2024)
- Student to teacher ratio: 22.34
- Colors: Red; White
- Athletics conference: Moore League
- Nickname: Lancers
- Rival: Millikan High School
- Newspaper: The Lance
- Website: lakewood.lbschools.net
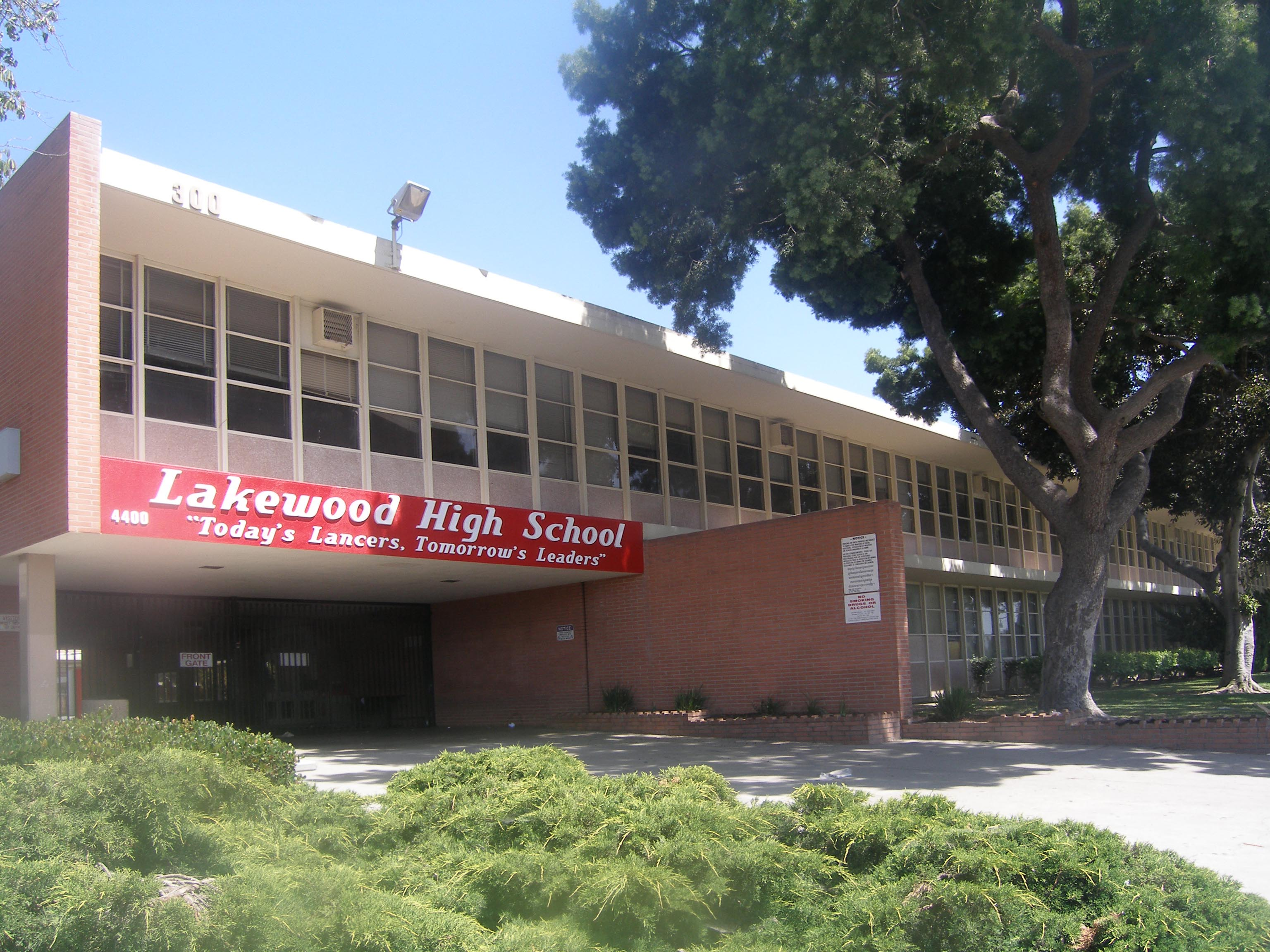
- Lakewood High School in 2008

Ethnic composition as of 2020–21
Race and ethnicity	Total
Hispanic or Latino	55%
African American	18.5%
Asian	11.6%
Non-Hispanic White/Anglo	10.1%
Other	2.5%
Pacific Islander	2.1%
Native American	0.2%

Lakewood High School is a public secondary school located in the southern California city of Lakewood. Founded in 1957, it is part of the Long Beach Unified School District. Lakewood is the architectural twin of nearby Millikan High School, which opened in 1956.

== Demographics ==
The demographic breakdown of the 3,693 students enrolled in 2013-2014 was:

- Male - 52.0%
- Female - 48.0%
- Native American/Alaskan - 0.2%
- Asian/Pacific islanders - 13.7%
- Black - 16.9%
- Hispanic - 45.4%
- White - 21.4%
- Multiracial - 2.4%

49.3% of the students were eligible for free or reduced lunch.

== Athletics ==
=== State championships ===
- Baseball: 1962, 1970, 1976, 1987, 2006
- Girls' Volleyball: 2007

== Notable alumni ==
- Dion Bailey, NFL football player
- Ryan Bancroft, conductor
- Steve Bollenbach, CEO of Hilton Hotels
- Mike Carp, Major League Baseball (MLB) infielder
- Larry Casian, MLB pitcher
- J.R. Celski, Olympic speedskater
- Floyd Chiffer, MLB pitcher
- Duane Cooper, NBA point guard
- J. P. Crawford, MLB baseball player
- Travis d'Arnaud, MLB catcher
- Shane Dawson, YouTuber, musician, actor, writer, director
- Matt Duffy, MLB infielder
- Damion Easley, MLB infielder
- John Elefante, singer, songwriter
- Bruce Ellingsen, MLB pitcher
- Pat Farrah, co-founder of The Home Depot
- Mike Fitzgerald, MLB catcher
- John Flannery, MLB infielder
- Rod Gaspar, MLB outfielder
- Steve Genter, 1972 Summer Olympics gold medalist (swimming)
- Bob Goen, game show host
- Chris Gomez, MLB infielder
- Craig Grebeck, MLB infielder
- Robert W. Hillman, law professor
- Hunter Jones, MLB outfielder
- Dave Marshall, MLB outfielder
- Jeremy McNichols, NFL football running back for Tampa Bay Buccaneers
- Tod Murphy, NBA power forward/center
- Tony Muser, MLB baseball manager, infielder
- Mike Rae, NFL football quarterback
- Barbara Allen Rainey, first American female naval aviator
- Marie Walther, Olympic gymnast, 1964
- Ashley Welkos, (AKA Maitland Ward), pornographic actress, two-time winner of AVN Award for Best Actress
- Terry Burnham, actress
- Ricky Tiedemann, MLB pitcher
- Jacob Wiley, Israeli Basketball Premier League player

== See also ==
Spur Posse
