= Victim Rights Law Center =

American non-profit organization

- Founded: 2003
- Founder: Susan Vickers
- Type: Legal services organization
- Purpose: Sexual assault
- Location: Boston, Massachusetts, U.S.
- Origins: Originally a project of the Boston Area Rape Crisis Center
- Region served: United States
- Key people: Stacy Malone, Esq., Executive Director
- Website: victimrights.org

The Victim Rights Law Center (VRLC) is a non-profit organization that provides free legal services to victims of rape and sexual assault in Massachusetts. Established in 2003, it became the first nonprofit law center in the United States solely dedicated to serving the legal needs of sexual assault victims. VRLC's mission is to "provide legal representation to victims of rape and sexual assault to help rebuild their lives and to promote a national movement committed to seeking justice for every rape and sexual assault victim." VRLC also seeks to transform the legal response to sexual assault in the United States.

Victim Rights Law Center began as a project of the Boston Area Rape Crisis Center in 2000. Founder Susan Vickers focused the organization's legal services on victims assaulted by non-intimate partners. The organization became an independent 501(c)(3) non-profit in 2003. VRLC has expanded nationally after receiving a grant from the Department of Justice's Office on Violence Against Women. Through the grant, VRLC is providing technical assistance and training to other organizations serving sexual assault victims throughout the United States.

VRLC provides its clients with legal assistance and assists when they are having difficulty with employers, schools or insurance companies. The organization also advocates for the rights of rape victims. After a Massachusetts Supreme Judicial Court decision made it easier for defense lawyers to review mental health records of victims of sexual assault, VRLC criticized the ruling, saying it would discourage rape victims from getting counseling. In 2021, VRLC was involved in a legal case challenging the 2020 Title IX Amendments. On July 28, 2021, the Massachusetts Federal District Court made a decision in Victim Rights Law Center et al. v. Cardona to vacate part of one of the Title IX provisions, 34 C.F.R. § 106.45(b)(6)(i) and sent the decision to the United States Department of Education for federal consideration. On August 24, 2021, the Acting Assistant Secretary for Civil Rights, Suzanne B. Goldberg, sent out a letter to students, educators, and other stakeholders that declared the decision made in Victim Rights Law Center et al. v. Cardona to apply nationwide.

Victim Rights Law Center serves:

- Sexual assault survivors (based on self-identification- criminal charges NOT required)
- No age, income, citizenship, or immigration status restrictions
- May include family members in immigration cases
- Only in legal matters related to the sexual assault

Victim Rights Law Center's Practice Areas:

- Victim advocacy
- Safety and privacy
- Benefits and financial stability
- Housing
- Employment
- Education

== See also ==
- National Organization for Women (NOW) Woman of Courage Award Winners
- Post-assault treatment of sexual assault victims
- Rape
- Sexual assault
