= Forest Hills, Nova Scotia =

Human settlement in Nova Scotia, Canada

Coordinates: 44°40′15.5″N 63°29′25.2″W

Forest Hills in Nova Scotia

Forest Hills is a subdivision in the community of Cole Harbour and in the Canadian province of Nova Scotia, located in the Halifax Regional Municipality.

== History ==
Forest Hills is a new town developed by the former Nova Scotia Housing Commission, a provincial agency, which purchased the land in 1971. In the early 1970s, the Nova Scotia Department of Highways constructed the Forest Hills Parkway, the main road serving the development. Forest Hills was officially opened by housing minister Walter Fitzgerald on June 18, 1974. At that time, around 90 homes were under construction in the first phase of development.

The master plan, released in 1974, called for eleven predominantly residential development phases as well as a town centre and an interconnected network of parks. Scotia Stadium opened in 1975 with funding from the Housing Commission and later evolved into the Cole Harbour Place sports and recreation centre.

The Forest Hills Sales and Information Office opened during the 1976-77 fiscal year.

== Education ==
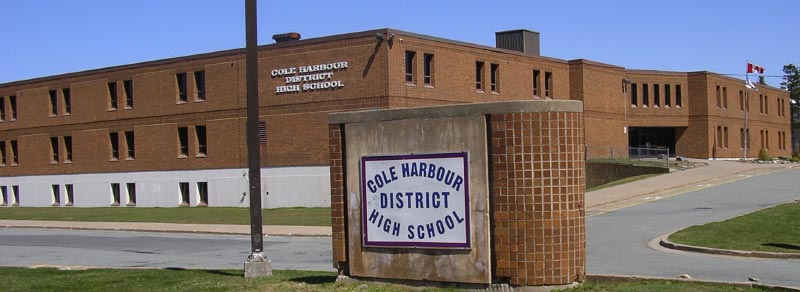
Cole Harbour District High School

Forest Hills is home to two high schools: Cole Harbour District High School and Auburn Drive High School.

The area is also home to George Bissett Elementary School, Robert Kemp Turner Elementary School, Joseph Giles Elementary School, and Sir Robert Borden Junior High School.

== Transportation ==
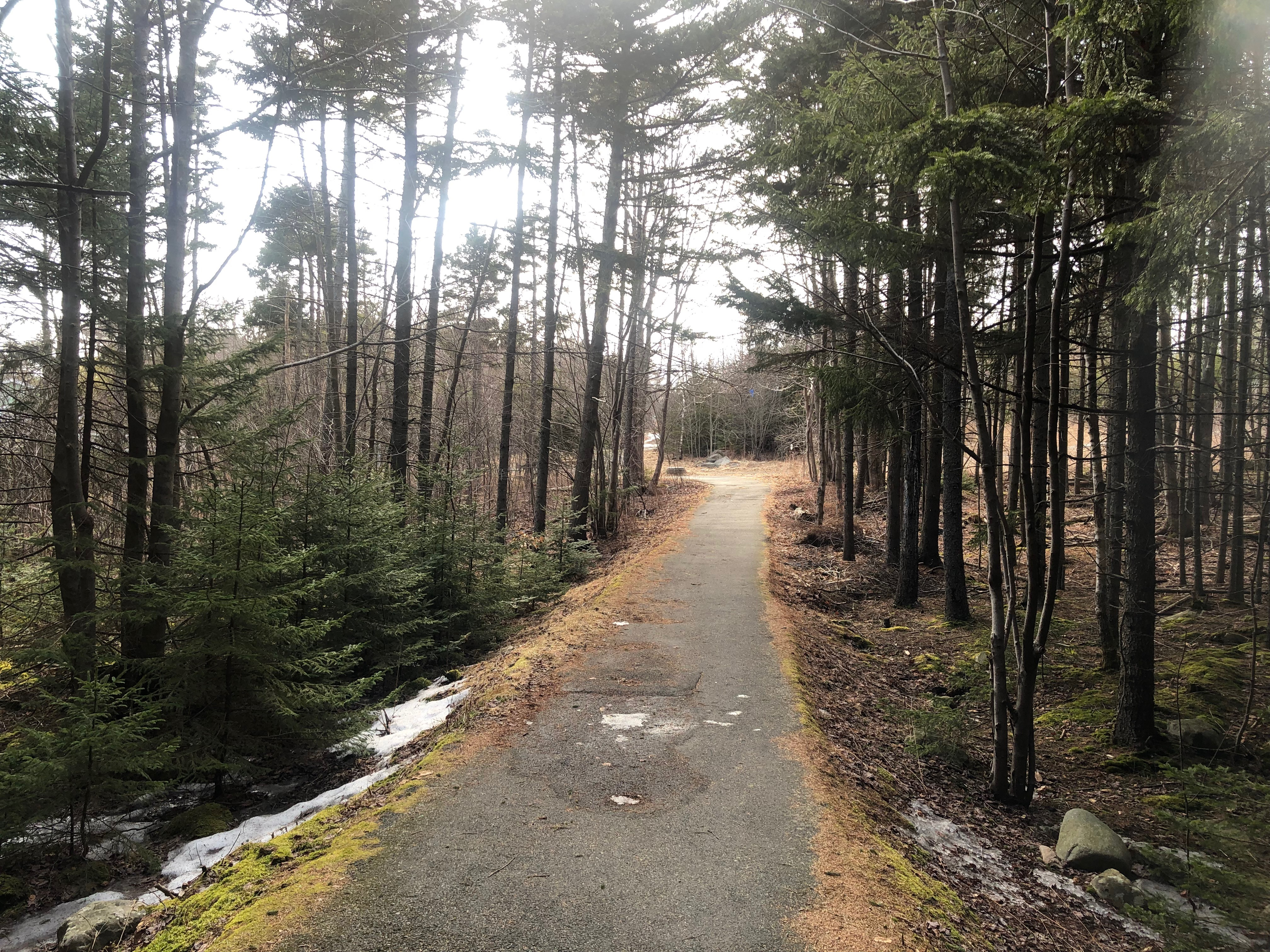
A paved trail in Forest Hills

=== Public transit ===
Public transit is provided in the community by several Halifax Transit bus routes. These include:

Local routes

Local routes run all day, seven days a week, and connect Forest Hills to the nearby Portland Hills Terminal.

- 61 North Preston
- 63 Mount Edward
- 68 Cherry Brook

Express routes

Express routes run during the weekday rush hours only. They connect Forest Hills to downtown Halifax.

- 161 North Preston Express
- 168A Auburn Express
- 168B Cherry Brook Express

=== Walking and cycling ===
Forest Hills has a network of multi-use pathways suitable for cycling, including one that runs the length of Forest Hills Parkway, as well as smaller pathways and trails.
