= Safe Campus Act =

The Safe Campus Act (H.R. 3403) was introduced to the US House of Representatives by Matt Salmon (R-AZ), Pete Sessions (R-TX), and Kay Granger (R-TX) on July 29, 2015. The bill aims to prevent colleges from pursuing internal investigations in cases of campus sexual assault. This restriction would legally require alleged victims of sexual assault to report the crime to the police in order to see justice on campus.

== Major provisions ==
=== Reporting to law enforcement ===
The Safe Campus Act would require schools to report each allegation of sexual violence to local law enforcement for investigation after obtaining written consent from the alleged victim. Schools would be required to wait for the results of a law enforcement investigation before beginning their own internal disciplinary procedures, and would not be allowed to punish the accused in cases where the alleged victim did not consent to a law enforcement investigation. In cases where deemed necessary to protect the safety of the alleged victim, schools would be permitted to impose interim measures such as temporary suspensions, no contact orders, adjustments to class schedules, and changes in housing assignments. These interim measures would be lifted after the completion of the law enforcement investigation if it did not result in an indictment. Alleged victims would have the right to submit a joint request with law enforcement for interim measures if both agreed that they would not protect the safety of the alleged victim, and schools would be required to honor such a request. Students would be protected from being disciplined for violations of school rules that came to light as a result of their reporting of sexual violence.

=== Due process ===
The Safe Campus Act would require a formal hearing before students could be disciplined for sexual violence. Schools would be required to provide all parties with at least two weeks notice before the hearing. Both the accused and the alleged victim would have the right to an attorney at their own expense, the right to access all evidence, and the right to cross-examination, although such cross-examination would be prohibited from including any questions on the sexual history of the alleged victim. Schools would be required to ensure that those adjudicating allegations do not have conflicts of interest. Students who are found responsible for sexual violence would have the right to judicial review of that decision. Schools would be required to publish their procedures for adjudicating allegations of sexual violence in their student handbooks.

=== Sexual Violence Education ===
The Safe Campus Act requires universities to educate all adult and student staff on sexual assault and reporting. It also encourages, but does not require the university to provide sexual assault education to the students. Universities must allocate funds to these programs and for programs to help victims of sexual assault on campus.

== Criticism ==
The provision requiring an alleged victim to report an act of sexual violence to law enforcement before the accused student could be punished has generated controversy.

=== Opponents ===
The bill's opponents point to low reporting rates in cases of sexual assault and insist forced reporting to the police will inhibit even more victims from coming forward as victims of a sexual crime. Opponents also point out that this bill singles out sexual assault crimes, as colleges can still punish students with other accusations, even without a criminal investigation. Some of the most outspoken opponents of this bill are the National Panhellenic Conference and the North American Inter-fraternity Conference.

==== The Fair Campus Act ====
The Fair Campus Act was introduced shortly after the Safe Campus Act as a response to the criticism of the Safe Campus Act. This bill is very similar but does not require sexual assault victims to report to the police in order for there to be a college investigation, which was the main issue for the opponents of the Safe Campus Act.

=== Supporters ===
Supporters of this bill claim mandatory police reporting will ensure students have access to fair representation during a trial, which may not be the case in a campus hearing, as it does not have criminal implications without the police.

The Safe Campus Act is supported by the Foundation for Individual Rights in Education and the National District Attorneys Association.

== See also ==
- Post-assault treatment of sexual assault victims
