= Bernard Lefkowitz =

American sociologist and journalist

- Born: 1937/1938; United States
- Died: May 21, 2004 (aged 66); New York City, United States
- Occupations: Author, journalist, sociologist, investigative reporter

Bernard Lefkowitz (1937/1938 – May 21, 2004) was an American author, sociologist, journalist and investigative reporter.

A reporter and assistant editor at the New York Post, Lefkowitz worked for the Peace Corps before becoming an author. He wrote many books, including The Victims, Break-time: Living Without Work in a Nine-to-Five World, and Tough Change: Growing Up on Your Own in America, and Our Guys: The Glen Ridge Rape and the Secret Life of the Perfect Suburb.

Our Guys dealt with the Glen Ridge Rape of a mentally disabled girl by a group of popular high school students and the town (Glen Ridge, New Jersey) that rallied around them. Lauded by The New York Times as a notable book of the year, as well as an Edgar Award finalist, Our Guys was made into a television movie starring Ally Sheedy Eric Stoltz and Heather Matarazzo.

Lefkowitz taught journalism at City College, Duke University and Columbia University.

Lefkowitz died due to thymus gland cancer on May 21, 2004.
