= Sunset Acres =

- Location within Gauteng Location within South Africa
- Coordinates: 26.087°S 28.049°E
- Country: South Africa
- Province: Gauteng
- Municipality: City of Johannesburg
- Main Place: Sandton

Area
  - Total: 0.19 km^{2} (0.073 sq mi)

Population (2011)
  - Total: 802
  - Density: 4,200/km^{2} (11,000/sq mi)

Racial makeup (2011)
  - Black African: 38.7%
  - Coloured: 2.7%
  - Indian/Asian: 10.8%
  - White: 47.3%
  - Other: 0.5%

First languages (2011)
  - English: 63.8%
  - Zulu: 6.1%
  - Northern Sotho: 4.9%
  - Afrikaans: 3.5%
  - Other: 21.8%
- Time zone: UTC+2 (SAST)
- Postal code (street): 2196

Sunset Acres is a suburb of Johannesburg, South Africa. It is located in Region E of the City of Johannesburg Metropolitan Municipality.
