= Auburn Drive High School =

Auburn High
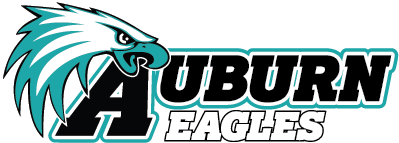

Location
- 300 Auburn Drive; Dartmouth, Nova Scotia, B2W 6E9; Canada; 44°41′16″N 63°28′58″W

Information
- Type: High school
- Motto: "Blood, sweat, and teal"
- Established: 1995
- School district: Halifax Regional Centre for Education
- Principal: Karen Hudson
- Grades: 10-12
- Female: CO-ED
- Enrollment: 841 (2025)
- Campus: Suburban
- Colours: Teal, black, and white
- Mascot: Boomer the Eagle
- Website: abn.hrce.ca

Auburn Drive High School (ADHS) is a Canadian public high school located in the Sunset Acres neighbourhood of Westphal, Nova Scotia. It serves students from grades 10 to 12. Auburn's feeder schools include Astral Drive Junior High School and Graham Creighton Junior High School. Its elementary feeder schools are Astral Drive Elementary School, Colby Village Elementary School, Caldwell Road Elementary, Joseph Giles Elementary, Humber Park Elementary and Bell Park Academic Centre. In 2011, Auburn ranked fourth with a grade of B+ on the AIMS list.

== History ==
The school building was constructed in 1995. In 2011, the Atlantic Institute for Market Studies (AIMS) High School Report Card ranked Auburn Drive fourth in Nova Scotia with a grade of B+.

== Courses ==
Auburn Drive offers French Immersion, Advanced Placement (AP) options, and the Options and Opportunities (O2) program. The school's course catalogue lists offerings across English, mathematics, sciences (e.g., Biology, Chemistry, Physics, Geology 12, Oceans 11, Human Biology 11), social studies (e.g., Mi'kmaq Studies 11, African Canadian Studies 11, Law 12, Global Geography/History), fine arts (Drama 10–12, Visual Art 10–12, Instrumental Band 10–12), technology and business (e.g., Exploring Technology 10; Communications Technology 11; Design 11; Business Technology 11/12; Computer Programming 12; Construction Technology 12; Automotive Technology 11/12), and media courses including Film & Video Production 12, Applied Broadcast Journalism 12, and Audio Recording & Production 12.

== Arts ==
Auburn's theatre program stages student productions and participates in Theatre Nova Scotia's Nova Scotia High School DramaFest. In 2025, the Drama 11/12 class presented an original show for feeder elementary schools and took a separate production to DramaFest at Dalhousie University (7–9 May). The school also hosted a dinner-theatre production, All-Star, in February 2025. For 2025–26, Auburn announced a cabaret-style musical, Cabaret! Cabaret!, running 26–28 November 2025, with plans to mount a full musical in the following year. Auburn students have also appeared at DramaFest in prior years.

== Sports ==
Varsity and junior varsity sports teams include Hockey, Basketball, Soccer, Rugby, Football, Volleyball and Table Tennis.

Teams compete as the Auburn Eagles. The boys' basketball team won the Nova Scotia Division 1 provincial championship three consecutive years (2013, 2014, 2015).

== Student council ==
Auburn's student council organizes school spirit and community events and communicates updates via the school's channels. Examples include Halloween week activities such as a haunted house, sensory-reduced trick-or-treating, and a "Humans vs. Zombies" evening, as well as annual student council elections held at the end of May. School newsletters also direct students to the @boomertheeagle Instagram account for student council and athletics updates.

== Covid-19 ==
The school was shut down on November 20, 2020, for two weeks after two COVID-19 cases were connected to the school.

== Notable alumni ==
- Gary Beals - Second-place finisher in the first season of Canadian Idol.
- Matt Mays - Canadian folk-rock singer.
- Alex Tanguay - NHL player for Colorado Avalanche.
