= Sunset Acres, Nova Scotia =

Coordinates: 44°41′52.82″N 63°29′10.21″W

Sunset Acres in Nova Scotia

Sunset Acres is a neighborhood of Westphal, Nova Scotia, Canada, in the Halifax Regional Municipality.
