= Cole Harbour District High School =

Coordinates: 44°40′55.1″N 63°29′22.5″W

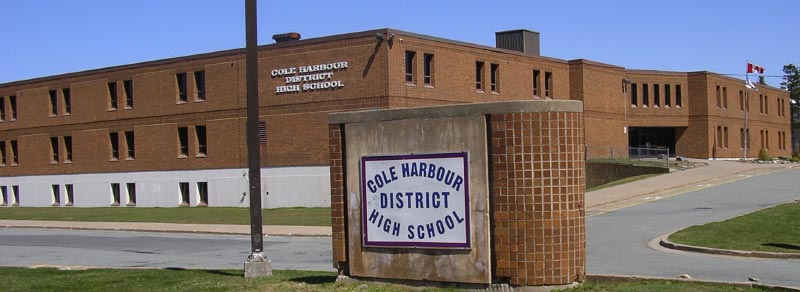

Location
- 2 Chameau Crescent; Dartmouth, Nova Scotia, B2W 4X4; Canada

Information
- School type: High school
- Founded: 1979 (Founded in 1982 after Cole Harbour High amalgamated with Gorden Bell High)
- School district: Halifax Regional Centre for Education
- Principal: Huntley Reddick
- Grades: 10–12
- Enrollment: 371 (2025)
- Language: English, French immersion
- Area: Forest Hills
- Colours: Red, White and Blue
- Mascot: Captain Cavvy
- Team name: Cole Harbour Cavaliers (Cavs)
- Feeder schools: Sir Robert Borden Junior High School, Ross Road School
- Website: chd.hrsb.ca
- Last updated: Feb 22, 2026

Cole Harbour District High School is a Canadian public high school located in the Forest Hills area of Cole Harbour, Nova Scotia. It is operated by the Halifax Regional Centre for Education (HRCE) and is an International Baccalaureate (IB) world school that offers the IB Diploma Programme.

== History ==
Cole Harbour District High School was founded in 1982 by the amalgamation of Cole Harbour High School, founded in 1979, and Gordon Bell High School.

The newer building for Cole Harbour High was used as the new location for Cole Harbour District High, and Gordon Bell High was repurposed as the Gordon Bell Building, a general-purpose adult education centre.

The Gordon Bell Building served as the Grade 10 building until 1995 when the Cole Harbour District high school was split into two separate schools; Cole Harbour High and Auburn Drive High School. The Bell building was also used as a temporary location for the students of Halifax West High School during the 2001-2002 school year, when its own building was unusable due to health concerns.

As of January 2015, the Gorden Bell building has been demolished. An all-weather field was constructed on the old Gordon Bell site and opened in 2017.

== Curriculum ==
Cole Harbour District High School offers a range of courses, categorized as academic, advanced, or open (not required for entrance to university.)

=== International Baccalaureate Diploma Programme ===
The International Baccalaureate Diploma Programme has been offered at Cole Harbour District High School since the 2007–2008 school year (with the Diploma Prep program offered starting in 2006–2007), with its first year of graduates in 2009. Cole Harbour District High School is one of fifteen International Baccalaureate Organization accredited schools in Nova Scotia.

=== French immersion ===
Students can choose to study in either the English or French language. Nova Scotia requires a minimum of nine French credits to receive the French certificate, including a French Language Arts course for each grade level. At Cole Harbour District High School students can receive both French Immersion certification as well an International Baccalaureate Diploma.

== Extracurricular activities ==
Cole Harbour District High School has many different extracurricular activities for students to participate in. These include a number of competitive sports teams, clubs, and the Student Council.

=== Arts ===
Arts The school has offered IB visual arts exhibitions in collaboration with Halifax Regional Arts. In 2021, a pottery and fused glass lab was opened up within the school. In 2016, the school put on their first musical. Performances have not resumed since the COVID-19 pandemic began in 2020.

== Campus ==
In the 2014-2015 school year, after renovations, it added a new gym and a skilled trades centre while converting the old gymnasium into a cafetorium. The skilled trades centre also includes a yoga studio and a student council office.

== Awards and recognition ==
Cole Harbour District High is seen in the series Trailer Park Boys. It is used as the location to film the scenes that take place in the fictional Dartmouth Regional Vocational School (DRVS).

== Notable alumni ==
- T. J. Grant - three-time (HS) Wrestling Champion; retired mixed martial artist for the Ultimate Fighting Championship
- Robb Wells - of the Trailer Park Boys
- John-Paul Tremblay - of the Trailer Park Boys
- David Banfield - Former NHL referee
- Kevin Deveaux - MLA for Cole Harbour-Eastern Passage (1998-2007) and UN Expert on Parliaments
- Rehtaeh Parsons - a 17-year-old student who committed suicide in late 2011.
