= Vanderbilt rape case =

Rape case in Nashville, Tennessee

- Location: Vanderbilt University, Nashville, Tennessee
- Date: June 23, 2013
- Victim: 1
- Perpetrators: Brandon Vandenburg, Lamont Batey, Brandon E. Banks, Jaborian "Tip" McKenzie
- Charges: Aggravated rape, Aggravated sexual battery
- Convictions: 3 at trial, 1 by plea. Sentences of 15–17 years for convictions at trial

The Vanderbilt rape case is a criminal case of sexual assault that occurred on June 23, 2013, in Nashville, Tennessee, in which four Vanderbilt University football players carried an unconscious 21-year-old female student into a dorm room, where they gang-raped and sodomized her, while videotaping the attack.

Three of the rapists were convicted, and received prison sentences ranging from 15 years, the minimum allowed by Tennessee law for their crimes, to 17 years. The fourth player accepted a plea deal which included 10 years' probation, and did not receive any jail time.

== Rape ==
The victim testified that she met Brandon Vandenburg (20) at The Tin Roof bar in Nashville on the evening of June 23, 2013. Vandenburg was, according to ESPN, "the nation's No. 1 junior college tight end" at the time, though he had not yet played a game as a Commodore.

The victim had seen Vandenburg two or three times before that night. At the bar, Vandenburg gave her multiple drinks. After the fourth, a blue drink she said he called a "California Long Island Iced Tea," she remembers almost nothing until she woke up the next morning.

Vandenburg drove the victim back to his dorm in the school's Gillette Hall, where he enlisted the help of teammates Lamont Batey (19), Brandon E. Banks (19), and Jaborian "Tip" McKenzie (19), in carrying the woman to his room where they gang-raped and sodomized her, slapped her, inserted their fingers in her, and sat on her face as she was on the floor in a 32-minute attack. They took over 40 graphic photos, and took videos of the rape with the cell phones of Vandenburg, Batey, and Banks. The victim (who is white) told the court that after Batey (who is black) raped her, he urinated on her face while saying she deserved what he was doing to her because of the color of her skin, saying what sources reported was "That's for 400 years of slavery, you bitch."

== Investigation ==
By June 25, details began to emerge after campus staffers found "suspicious" surveillance footage while researching a separate incident. Gerald Black, an associate dean who oversaw student misconduct hearings, recorded interviews with nine student-athletes over several hours. Later, officials alerted campus police.

On June 29, Vandenburg, Batey, Banks and Mckenzie, were dismissed from the team.

In August, investigators met with Joseph D. Quinzio and Miles J. Finley, friends of Vandenburg who lived in California and who were in receipt of some of the graphic videos. The two were high school teammates and friends of Vandenburg.

On August 9, Vandenburg, Batey, Banks and Mckenzie were each indicted on five counts of aggravated rape and two counts of aggravated sexual battery.

On August 16, three more people, including Chris Boyd, a Commodores star wide receiver at the time, were also indicted. Boyd was charged with one felony count of being an accessory after the fact. Finley and Quinzio were charged with evidence tampering.

== Case ==
The four defendants documented their gang rape with videos and pictures. They tried to delete them later on. When the footage was recovered, it was presented in court, along with hallway security camera footage of the defendants carrying the victim.

Chris Boyd, plead guilty in September 2013 to being an accessory after the fact by encouraging teammates to keep quiet and destroy evidence of the rape. He was dismissed from the team but not the university for his role in helping cover up the rape. He testified against Vandenberg and Batey as part of the plea deal, and was sentenced to a year of unsupervised probation.

The trial of Vandenburg and Batey at Davidson County Criminal Court began on January 12, 2015 and concluded on January 27 when the jury found both men guilty of multiple counts of aggravated rape and aggravated sexual battery. On June 23, 2015 a mistrial was declared based on a juror failing to disclose that she had been a victim of statutory rape.

Batey was retried on April 4, 2016 and after four days of testimony the jury returned guilty verdicts on aggravated rape, facilitation of aggravated rape, two counts of attempted aggravated rape, and three counts of aggravated sexual battery. In July 2016, Batey received a 15-year prison sentence, the minimum allowed by law for his crimes (while both the victim and prosecutors had asked the judge for the maximum sentence possible of 25 years). After he gets out he will be required to be listed on the sex-offender registry for the rest of his life. He is serving his time in Riverbend Maximum Security Institution.

Vandenburg was retried on June 13, 2016 and days later found guilty of five counts of aggravated rape, two counts of aggravated sexual battery, and one count of unlawful photography. While Vandenburg was not accused of engaging directly in the rape, the prosecution argued criminal responsibility under Tennessee Law. In November 2016, Vandenburg was sentenced to 17 years in prison. After release, he will be required to be listed on the sex-offender registry for the rest of his life. He is serving his time in Morgan County Correctional Complex.

Banks was tried on June 19, 2017 and was found guilty of one count of aggravated rape and one count of aggravated sexual battery. In August 2017, after being convicted, Banks received a 15-year sentence. Upon release he will be required to be listed on the sex-offender registry for the rest of his life. He is serving his time in Turney Center Industrial Complex.

McKenzie plead guilty to one count of facilitation of aggravated rape on May 21, 2018. He testified against his co-defendants and received 10 years probation and lifetime registration as a sex offender. He was the only one of the four defendants to not receive any jail time. He was not seen touching the victim after he helped his teammates carry her into the dorm room.

Appeals by Batey, Vandenburg, and Banks to the Tennessee Court of Criminal Appeals to have their convictions overturned were unsuccessful in 2019. In 2020, the Tennessee Supreme Court declined to reconsider Vandenburg's appeal of his conviction.

== See also ==
- Baylor University sexual assault scandal
- Sexual assault of Savannah Dietrich
- Steubenville High School rape case
- Campus sexual assault
- 2024 Cornell University rape allegations
