= La Salle University basketball scandal =

2004 rape accusations in Pennsylvania

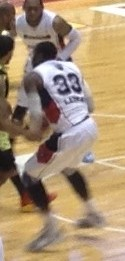
Dzaflo Larkai with Yokohama B-Corsairs

The La Salle University basketball scandal was an incident that began in June 2004, in which three members of the La Salle University men's basketball team (Gary Neal, Michael Cleaves, and Dzaflo Larkai) were accused of rape in two separate incidents.

One allegation related to an encounter in April 2003 where one men's basketball player was accused of raping a women's basketball player. These charges were dismissed in December 2005 after the accuser decided not to proceed. The other allegation related to an incident in June 2004 where two other members of the basketball team were accused of raping a visiting female basketball player. These two players were acquitted on November 4, 2005, after a trial.

It later emerged that men's basketball coach Billy Hahn and women's basketball coach John Miller had known about allegations surrounding the rape of the women's basketball player, but hadn't told school officials about it. However, Hahn and Miller were required by school policy to report the incident to a counselor. This was to ensure La Salle's compliance with the Clery Act, which requires colleges to report information about crime on campus. As a result, La Salle forced Hahn and Miller to resign on July 24, 2004.
