= Suicide of Rehtaeh Parsons =

Suicide of a student in Canada

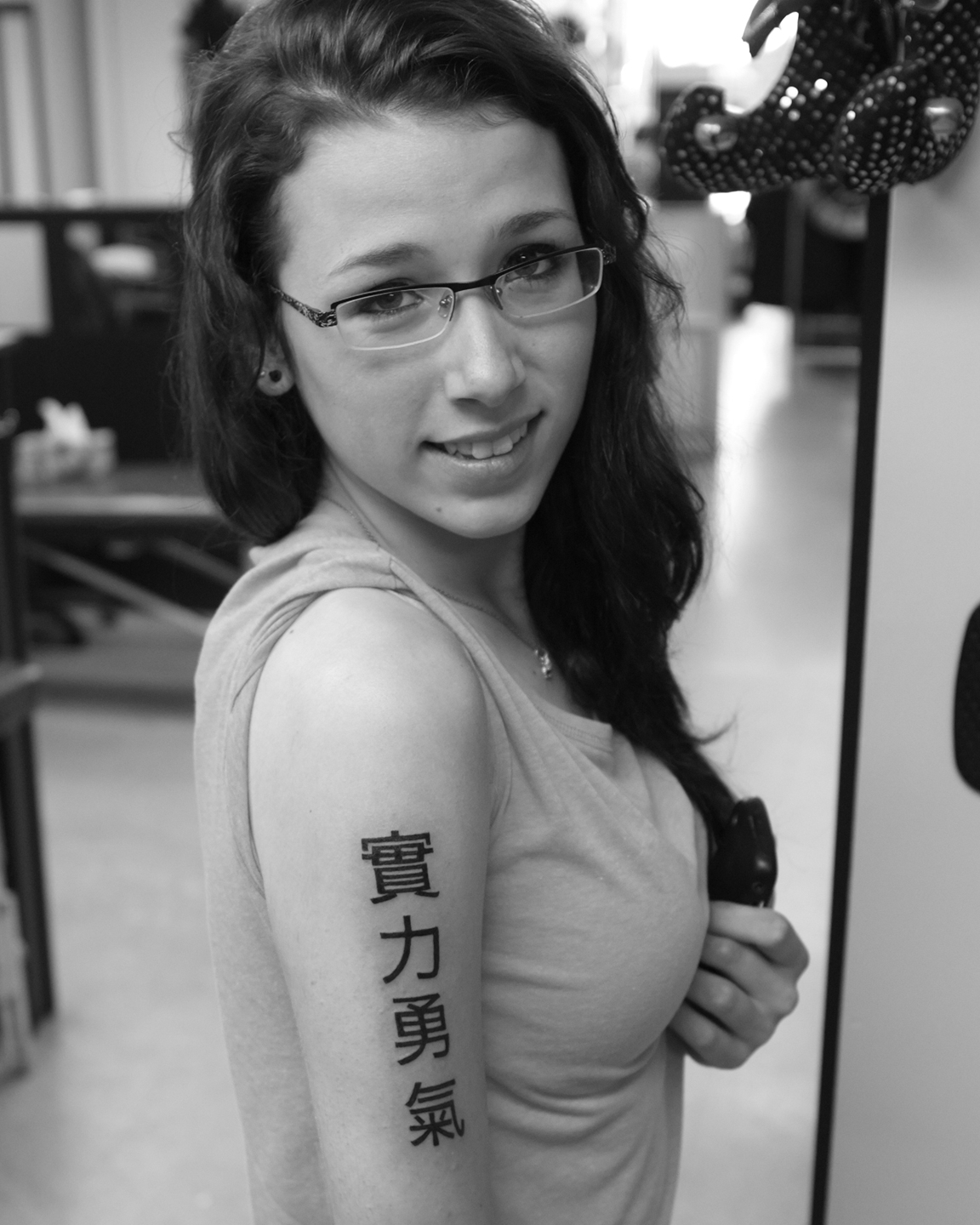
- Parsons in 2012
- Location: Halifax, Nova Scotia, Canada
- Burial: Halifax
- Born: December 9, 1995
- Died: April 7, 2013 (aged 17)

Rehtaeh Anne Parsons (/rəˈteɪə/, rə-TAY-ə; December 9, 1995 – April 7, 2013) was a 17-year-old Cole Harbour District High School student who attempted suicide by hanging at her home in Dartmouth, Nova Scotia, Canada, on April 4, 2013, leading to a coma and the decision to switch her life support machine off three days later. Her death has been attributed to online distribution of photos of an alleged gang rape that occurred 17 months prior to her suicide attempt, in November 2011. On a Facebook page set up in tribute to her daughter, Parsons' mother blamed the four boys who allegedly raped and released images of her, the subsequent constant "bullying and messaging and harassment", and the failure of the Canadian justice system, for her daughter's decision to die by suicide.

In response to Parsons' suicide, Nova Scotia enacted a law in August 2013 allowing victims to seek protection from cyberbullying and to sue the perpetrator.

== Background ==
In November 2011, Rehtaeh Parsons, then 15, went with a friend to a home in which she was allegedly raped by four teenage boys. The teenagers were drinking vodka at a small party. Parsons had little memory of the event, except that, at one point, she vomited while a boy was allegedly raping her. The incident was photographed and the photo became widespread in Parsons' school and town in three days. Afterwards, many in school called Parsons a "slut" and she received text messages and Facebook messages from people requesting to have sex with her. The alleged rape went unreported for several days until Parsons broke down and told her family, who contacted an emergency health team and the police.

According to an RCMP report, in March 2013, six boys, including some of Parsons' alleged rapists, had an argument with three other boys. One of the three boys, who was a friend of Parsons, was stabbed and treated for a "non-life-threatening injury".

== Investigation ==
A year following the alleged rape, the RCMP concluded an investigation stating, "[an] investigation into an earlier sexual assault was completed, and in consultation with the Crown, there was insufficient evidence to lay charges". According to the family, the boys were not questioned and their phones were not reviewed for the photograph of the rape in progress. Instead, the police called it a "he said, she said" case and also decided the photo was not criminal, in spite of Parsons being a minor. Likewise, there were no arrests for the March 2013 stabbing incident.

Following the suicide, the RCMP announced they were reviewing the case. On April 12, the RCMP announced the case was being reopened in light of "new and credible information" that they said did not come from the Internet.

In September 2014, one of the boys, by then 20, pleaded guilty to a charge of making child pornography in relation to the photo of Parsons. Citing the offender's age at the time of the crime and Canada's Youth Criminal Justice Act, the Crown prosecutor advised the judge that the only possible penalties in this case were either probation or a conditional discharge. In November 2014, the first defendant to plead guilty was sentenced to a conditional discharge with 12 months' probation. With a conditional discharge, his criminal record will not show a conviction in this case, unless he breaches the terms of his probation.

Also in November 2014, the second person charged, then 19, pleaded guilty to a charge of distributing child pornography, in relation to the photo of himself and Parsons. He was sentenced on January 15, 2015, to one year of probation and required to submit a sample to a DNA database. In an unusual move for a case involving minors convicted of a crime, the judge ruled that this conviction would be kept in his criminal record for a period of five years.

== Milton–Pepler inquiry ==
On June 14, 2013, the 56-page report of Penny Milton and Debra Pepler, two education experts from Ontario, was released. The provincial government of Darrell Dexter requested the report, which is entitled "External Review of the Halifax Regional School Board’s Support of Rehtaeh Parsons". One conclusion of the report was that Nova Scotian schools "need to do a better job preventing harassment and sexual aggression".

Significantly, the authors recommended an external review of the IWK Health Centre, the Halifax hospital where Parsons was a patient for five weeks after she had a breakdown and became suicidal. Canning said that Parsons was strip-searched by two men while receiving treatment in 2012 at the IWK, while the IWK denied the allegations.

The authors met with 111 people, including school board staff, Ministerial staff, school staff, youth, police, health-care workers and others. The authors received more than 150 submissions from the general public, but curiously failed to interview Parsons' friends or her teachers. Among the 13 recommendations made by the authors were:

- involving young people in advisory roles;
- ensuring that students help develop policies that affect them;
- clarifying the process for transferring students between schools;
- engaging parents;
- removing barriers between government bodies that serve students and their families;
- stronger anti-bullying and anti-sexual aggression policies in schools;
- restorative justice to help students "learn from their mistakes";
- more young people in government advisory roles;
- better school engagement with parents;
- a curriculum that includes "intellectual, ethical, social-emotional, and physical development for all students";
- schools should ensure harassment allegations are thoroughly investigated and perpetrators punished.

The report traced Parsons' history through the school system. She was transferred from Cole Harbour District High School, to Dartmouth High School, to Prince Andrew High School to Citadel High School. It recommended that the Halifax Regional School Board clarify the transfer approval process between schools, in order to stamp out any inconsistencies between policy and practices. School boards needed to share more information when kids transfer schools, as Parsons did to escape harassment. "The school to which Rehtaeh transferred received no information about these events and did not get to know Rehtaeh well," the report noted.

== Segal inquiry ==
The Parsons case also prompted an external inquiry into the conduct of the Crown Prosecutor's office. This inquiry, which was requested by the Dexter government in August 2013 and released on October 8, 2015, during the government of Stephen McNeil, was performed by Murray Segal, a former chief prosecutor in Ontario. The report was delayed until legal proceedings involving two men charged with child pornography offences in the case concluded. Segal made 17 recommendations, and found the system "failed" on just about every level; a series of improvements to policies, procedures and actions relating to cyberbullying, sexual violence, investigations and prosecutions was contained in the report, but significantly Segal wrote that it was reasonable of the Crown Prosecutor's office to conclude there was no realistic prospect that sexual assault charges would result in conviction, and thus "the decision not to lay charges of sexual assault was understandable."

Significantly, the Segal report found that school board officials prevented a police investigator from talking to students at Parsons’ school. The police investigator "made an attempt to attend at the school to interview as many students as possible about the photo... This attempt was apparently thwarted by school authorities." Segal found that it was "important that either police or school authorities" speak to the students. Segal continued: "Some work has also been done to clarify how schools and police interact, (but) we were informed that there is a lot of mystique around police investigations from the schools’ perspective: school authorities are loath to act when they are aware of an active criminal investigation, because they do not want to influence the evidence or prejudice the investigation." Education Minister Karen Casey said one week after the report's release that "each of the province’s school boards has its own protocol when it comes to dealing with police investigations on school property."

Other recommendations include that:

- the Halifax Regional Police and the RCMP revise their sexual assault and child abuse policies;
- police should create a policy for interviewing underage victims of sexual assault;
- an integrated police sex crimes unit that works more closely with the sexual assault investigation team be created;
- police and Crown prosecutors be given specific training as soon as they are assigned to deal with such crimes;
- more Crown prosecutors with specialized training be available;
- a memorandum should be written when the Crown decides there are insufficient grounds to lay a charge or feels there is no realistic chance of a conviction.

Segal made it clear that Parsons' complaint of sexual assault and cyberbullying was mishandled, and as early as one day later there were calls to implement his recommendations. "Simply making the report doesn't guarantee it happens. You need to have a number of people holding [the government] to account and seeing what's actually done", said Dalhousie law professor Wayne MacKay.

== Reactions ==
Following the suicide, Rehtaeh Parsons's mother, Leah Parsons, went public with the story and started a memorial Facebook page called "Angel Rehtaeh." The blog of Rehtaeh's father, Glen Canning, also went viral. The story drew international attention and sparked outrage on the Internet, with CBC reporting the phrase "Nova Scotia" was "trending on Twitter worldwide."

Canadian Prime Minister Stephen Harper commented on the case, saying he was "sickened" by the story and that the online bullying was "simply criminal activity." Rehtaeh's funeral on April 13 was attended by 500 people, including Nova Scotia Premier Darrell Dexter, who said he came "first and foremost as a father trying to imagine what kind of incredible, unfathomable grief could be visited upon a family."

There are reports that members of the hacker group Anonymous involved itself in tracing the alleged perpetrators of the incidents Parsons suffered. In its news release, Anonymous blamed the death on "school teachers, administrators, the police and prosecutors, those who should have been role models in the late Rehtaeh's life." Later, Anonymous announced it would not publicize the names of the individuals it believed to be the rapists, out of respect for the Parsons family's wishes. Leah Parsons had called for the case to be settled legally rather than by vigilantes.

Parsons' suicide and the circumstances surrounding it have been compared to those of British Columbian Amanda Todd and with Audrie Pott, a fifteen-year-old girl from Saratoga, California, United States, and appear to show similar characteristics. New laws are being considered after these events. Parsons has been described as a "victim of sexting".

After her suicide, posters appeared locally in support of the boys who allegedly attacked Parsons. The RCMP expressed concern that the posters might lead to vigilantism, although they did not name the accused.

On April 26, 2013, Christie Blatchford wrote in the National Post that a problem in the case was that one of Parsons' friends claimed Parsons was "flirtatious" on the night the photo was taken, was seen laughing in bed with two boys and also there were "accounts from Rehtaeh herself and independent evidence, including retrieved online messages, that supported the suggestion the sex that took place was consensual." Blatchford also wrote the photo did not show Parsons' face. In response, Parsons' father, Glen Canning, accused Blatchford of victim blaming and argued, "The two boys involved in taking and posing for the photograph stated Rehtaeh was throwing up when they had sex with her. That is not called consensual sex. That is called rape."

=== Legislative impact ===
In August 2013, Nova Scotia enacted a law allowing victims of cyberbullying to seek protection, including help in identifying anonymous perpetrators, and to sue the individuals or the parents in the case of minors. The law was passed in response to Parsons' suicide.

That law was quashed in 2015 by the Nova Scotia Supreme Court who ruled the law's definition of cyberbullying was too wide and infringed on Charter rights and freedom of expression.

A replacement law, the Intimate Images and Cyber-protection Act, was passed in 2017 and came into force in 2018.

=== Publication ban ===
Canadian media reports about criminal trials involving child pornography are subject to a publication ban under the Criminal Code: they must omit any information that would identify any minor who was involved in or witness to the case, including the victim, or be subject to fines. In November 2014, the Halifax Chronicle Herald violated the ban by publishing the name and photo of Parsons on its front page and online; the story was accompanied by an editor's note, stating: "We've decided to publish the name of the victim in this story, despite a court-ordered ban. We believe it's in the public interest in this unique case, given the widespread recognition of [her] name, and given the good that can come, and has already come, from free public debate over sexual consent and the other elements of her story." Noting that her name and photo had been widely disseminated prior to the trial, both the victim's parents and the trial's judge objected to the ban. The Chronicle Herald became the subject of investigation for its actions following complaints by police, although other media outlets have been investigated in Halifax for violating the ban but have not been subject to any charges.

In December 2014, Nova Scotia's attorney general announced that she was directing the province's Public Prosecution Service to pursue breaches of the publication ban in Parsons' case only if the breach is derogatory of Rehtaeh Parsons. The ban remains technically in place but unbiased reports about the case will not be subject to prosecution.

== See also ==
- Cyberstalking legislation
- Harassment by computer
- Post-assault treatment of sexual assault victims
- Steubenville High School rape case
- Torrington High School rape case
- List of suicides attributed to bullying
