= Suicide of Audrie Pott =

Suicide of an American teenager

Audrie Pott
- Born: Audrie Taylor Pott; May 27, 1997; California, U.S.
- Died: September 12, 2012 (aged 15); Saratoga, California, U.S.
- Cause of death: Suicide by hanging
- Education: Saratoga High School
- Occupation: Student

Audrie Taylor Pott (May 27, 1997 – September 12, 2012) was a 15-year-old student at Saratoga High School in Saratoga, California, who died by suicide. She had been sexually assaulted at a party eight days earlier by three 16-year-old boys she knew, and nude pictures of her were posted online with accompanying bullying.

On September 30, 2014, California Governor Jerry Brown signed Audrie's Law, "a bill that increases penalties and decreases privacy protections for teens convicted of sex acts on someone who is passed out from drugs or alcohol or incapable of giving consent due to a disability".

== Background ==
On September 3, 2012, Pott went to a party with about ten other teenagers where she became drunk. A few kids had stolen rum, and an adult had bought them vodka at a liquor shop. Once she was drunk, she was dragged up the stairs and into a bedroom. Three or more teenagers sexually assaulted Pott there. Three 16-year-old boys whom she knew eventually pleaded guilty to and served time in juvenile hall for the sexual assault. Markers were also used to draw and write on her body, and photographs were taken and distributed via social network and MMS. In the following days, Pott was bullied by some who saw the photographs. On September 12, 2012, she killed herself by hanging.

== Investigation ==
In April 2013, three sixteen-year-old boys were arrested in northern California on suspicion of sexual battery of Pott. Pott's parents also filed a lawsuit against the three teenagers, and in July 2013 they added a fifteen-year-old girl as a defendant in the suit, alleging she was present during the assault and later lied about it to help cover it up.

== Juvenile court case ==
Three teenage boys admitted in juvenile court to sexually assaulting and possessing photos of Audrie Pott, both felonies. Two of the three received 30-day sentences to be served on weekends. The other was sentenced to 45 consecutive days. Because of their ages and status as minors at the time of the incident, the three teenagers were not at first publicly identified.

== Civil trial ==
A civil case filed by Pott's parents, to decide if the boys were responsible for her death, was originally set to go to forward to trial in April 2015, but reached settlement before then. As part of the terms of settlement, two of the boys were required to verbally apologize in open court, admit again to the sexual assault, admit to their role in the death of Audrie Pott, agree to being filmed in a documentary, pay a combined $950,000, support the petition for an honorary diploma for Audrie Pott, and give ten presentations on sexual assault and sexting.

== Documentaries ==
A documentary film titled Audrie & Daisy, about the sexual assaults and social media bullying of Audrie Pott and Daisy Coleman, premiered at the Sundance Film Festival in January 2016.

The case was also profiled on an episode of the Investigation Discovery show Web of Lies (season 5, episode 1) titled "With Friends Like These", originally aired March 13, 2018.

== See also ==
- Cyberstalking legislation
- Harassment by computer
- Steubenville High School rape case
- Torrington High School rape case
- Post-assault treatment of victims of sexual assault
- Suicide of Rehtaeh Parsons
