= Audrie & Daisy =

- Directed by: Bonni Cohen; Jon Shenk
- Produced by: Richard Berge; Bonni Cohen; Sara Dosa
- Starring: Audrie Pott; Daisy Coleman; Paige Parkhurst; Melinda Coleman
- Cinematography: Jon Shenk
- Edited by: Don Bernier
- Music by: Tyler Strickland
- Production company: Actual Films
- Distributed by: Netflix
- Release dates: January 25, 2016 (Sundance); September 23, 2016
- Running time: 95 minutes
- Country: United States
- Language: English

Audrie & Daisy is a 2016 American documentary film about two cases of rape of teenage girls, in 2011 and 2012.

== Summary ==
The documentary includes the stories of two American high school students, Audrie Pott of Saratoga, California, and Daisy Coleman of Maryville, Missouri, who were each victims of separate sexual assaults. At the time of their respective assaults, Pott was 15 and Coleman was 14 years old. After the assaults, the victims and their families were subjected to abuse and cyberbullying.

The documentary follows their outcomes through time, social media, court documents, and police investigations. The film's directors Bonni Cohen and Jon Shenk, a husband-and-wife team who have teenage children of their own, had been fascinated by the role of social media in teenage lives and were attracted to the subject of the Daisy Coleman story as "a modern-day Scarlet Letter story". For over two years, the filmmakers filmed Daisy Coleman and members of her family as they faced both the trauma of Daisy's assault and the hostile reaction of their community. The film also features Maryville sheriff Darren White and Maryville mayor Jim Fall, with the sheriff saying: “Girls have as much culpability” in cases like Daisy's.

Audrie Pott died by suicide in 2012, nine days after the sexual assault. Daisy Coleman went on to co-found SafeBAE (Before Anyone Else), a non-profit organization aimed at ending sexual assaults in schools.

On August 4, 2020, Daisy Coleman also died by suicide after years of fighting depression and trauma. She was 23 years old. Four months later, Coleman's mother, Melinda, also died by suicide.

== Release ==
Audrie & Daisy had its world premiere at the 2016 Sundance Film Festival on January 25, 2016. The film was purchased by Netflix for streaming, and was released on September 23, 2016.

== Accolades ==
Award	Date of ceremony	Category	Recipient(s)	Result	Ref(s)
Annie Awards	February 4, 2017	Best Animated Special Production	Audrie & Daisy	Nominated	
Women Film Critics Circle Awards	December 18, 2016	Best Documentary By or About Women	Audrie & Daisy	Nominated	
Peabody Awards	May 20, 2017	Award of merit	AfterImage Public Media in association with Actual Films	Won	

== Cases ==
- Rape and suicide of Audrie Pott of Saratoga High School in Saratoga, California (September 3, 2012)
- Rape of 14-year-old Daisy Coleman and her 13-year-old friend Paige Parkhurst in Maryville, Missouri (January 8, 2012)
- Rape of Delaney Henderson of St. Joseph High School (Santa Maria, California) (June 2011)

== See also ==
- Post-assault treatment of sexual assault victims
