= Daisy Coleman =

American victim advocate (1997–2020)

- Born: Catherine Daisy Coleman; March 30, 1997; Albany, Missouri, U.S.
- Died: August 4, 2020 (aged 23); Denver, Colorado, U.S.
- Cause of death: Suicide
- Education: Missouri Valley College
- Occupation: Activist
- Known for: Advocating for people who have experienced rape, persecution and bullying; Co-founding SafeBAE (Before Anyone Else) www.safebae.org.
- Awards: Cinema Eye Honor (2016)

Catherine Daisy Coleman (March 30, 1997 – August 4, 2020) was an American sexual assault victim advocate who was the subject of the 2016 documentary film Audrie & Daisy, for which she received a Cinema Eye Honor. Coleman co-founded the non-profit organization SafeBAE, which is aimed at preventing sexual assault in schools. She died by suicide at the age of 23.

== Early life ==
Coleman was born to Melinda, a veterinarian and Michael Coleman, a physician. She had three brothers. In 2007, Michael, Daisy and one of her brothers were travelling in the car to watch another one of her brothers in a wrestling competition when the car hit black ice and went into a ravine, killing her father. After his death, Coleman and the rest of the family moved to Maryville, Missouri.

== 2012 sexual assault and investigation ==
In January 2012, a 17-year-old boy from Maryville, Missouri was arrested for the rape and sexual assault of Coleman, then 14. A 15-year-old boy was accused of doing the same to Coleman's 13-year-old friend, and a third boy admitted to recording the assault on a cellphone. A significant controversy arose in 2013 when the county prosecutor dropped felony and misdemeanor charges against the first boy, Matthew Barnett, who was related to Rex Barnett, an influential former state representative, and the Nodaway County prosecutor Robert Rice dropped the felony sexual exploitation charge against the third boy. Robert Rice was soon afterward appointed as a Judge in Nodaway County, the same county he threw out the case in.

Outrage in online communities, including Anonymous, soon followed when the story surrounding this case was revisited in October 2013. Michael Schaffer, reporting on the incident for The New Republic, described Maryville, Missouri as a "lawless hellhole". In 2014, a special prosecutor was put in charge to reinvestigate the case. The boy pleaded guilty to misdemeanor second-degree endangerment of the welfare of a child for leaving her outside her house, and was sentenced by Missouri Circuit Court Judge Glen Dietrich to four months in jail that were suspended in favor of two years of probation. He was sentenced in juvenile court for the assault.

== Career and activism ==
Coleman and her older brother Charlie advocated nationwide for sexual assault survivors. HuffPost named Coleman as one of the "13 most Fearless Teens of 2013". Coleman's story was featured in the 2016 Netflix documentary Audrie & Daisy. Coleman and Audrie Pott were recipients of a 2016 Cinema Eye Honor as "unforgettable" memorable non-fiction film subjects. She attended Missouri Valley College.

She co-founded SafeBAE (Safe Before Anyone Else), a non-profit organization aimed at ending sexual assault among middle and high school students, with her brother Charlie, Ella Fairon, Jada Smith, and Shael Norris. The organization uses a peer-to-peer model, training students to lead prevention work in their own schools on affirmative consent, dating violence, bystander intervention, survivor support, and students' rights under Title IX. Coleman toured high schools and colleges to screen Audrie & Daisy and speak on those subjects.

In April 2017, Coleman and her fellow co-founders launched Quit This Shit, a Sexual Assault Awareness Month campaign against the online harassment and re-victimization of teen survivors. The campaign paired a public service video, in which teenagers read aloud messages the founders of SafeBAE had received after their assaults became public, with a website where visitors could pledge against such harassment. In 2018, Coleman appeared on The Scarlet Letter Reports, a Facebook Watch series hosted by Amanda Knox, discussing how she was portrayed by the media and her community after reporting her assault and how she had come to work with other survivors. During the episode she tattooed a semicolon, a symbol associated with suicide survival, on Knox's finger. In the fall of 2019, Coleman and her brother Charlie spoke at the United Nations about SafeBAE's work, at the invitation of the World Childhood Foundation, the child protection organization founded by Queen Silvia of Sweden.

In June 2018, Coleman relocated to Colorado Springs, Colorado and was working as a tattoo artist. She also took guest spots at tattoo parlors around the country, tattooing other survivors while they shared their stories with her. She worked on a second film project titled Saving Daisy, focusing on her recovery process, post-traumatic stress disorder, and the use of CBD and EMDR therapy.

== Personal life and death ==
After the sexual assault, Coleman attempted suicide on multiple occasions. She became the target of daily bullying, prompting the family to move from Maryville to Albany, Missouri. On February 17, 2007 her father, Michael Coleman, died in a car accident. In June 2018, her younger brother Tristan died in a car accident at 19 years old.

Coleman died by suicide on August 4, 2020, at the age of 23. Her death drew tributes from figures connected to her advocacy. Amanda Knox, who had interviewed her for The Scarlet Letter Reports, and comedian Amy Schumer, a friend, both posted memorials on social media; Schumer described her as a "warrior" and "beautiful artist". Princess Madeleine of Sweden also paid tribute.

On December 6, 2020, her mother Melinda also died by suicide.

== Legacy ==
Following Coleman's death, her brother Charlie and SafeBAE executive director Shael Norris said the organization's school-based prevention education work would continue. SafeBAE named its Certified Peer Educator Training, a free self-paced consent training for high school students, in her memory. The organization marks her birthday, March 30, as Daisy Day, the annual launch of its Sexual Assault Awareness Month programming, and groups this memorial work under the hashtag #ForDaisy.

== Documentary ==
Year	Title	Role	Notes	Ref.
2016	Audrie & Daisy	Herself	Credited as Catherine Daisy Coleman	
2019	Saving Daisy	Herself	Credited as Catherine Daisy Coleman	
