= Lucy Walker (director) =

English film director

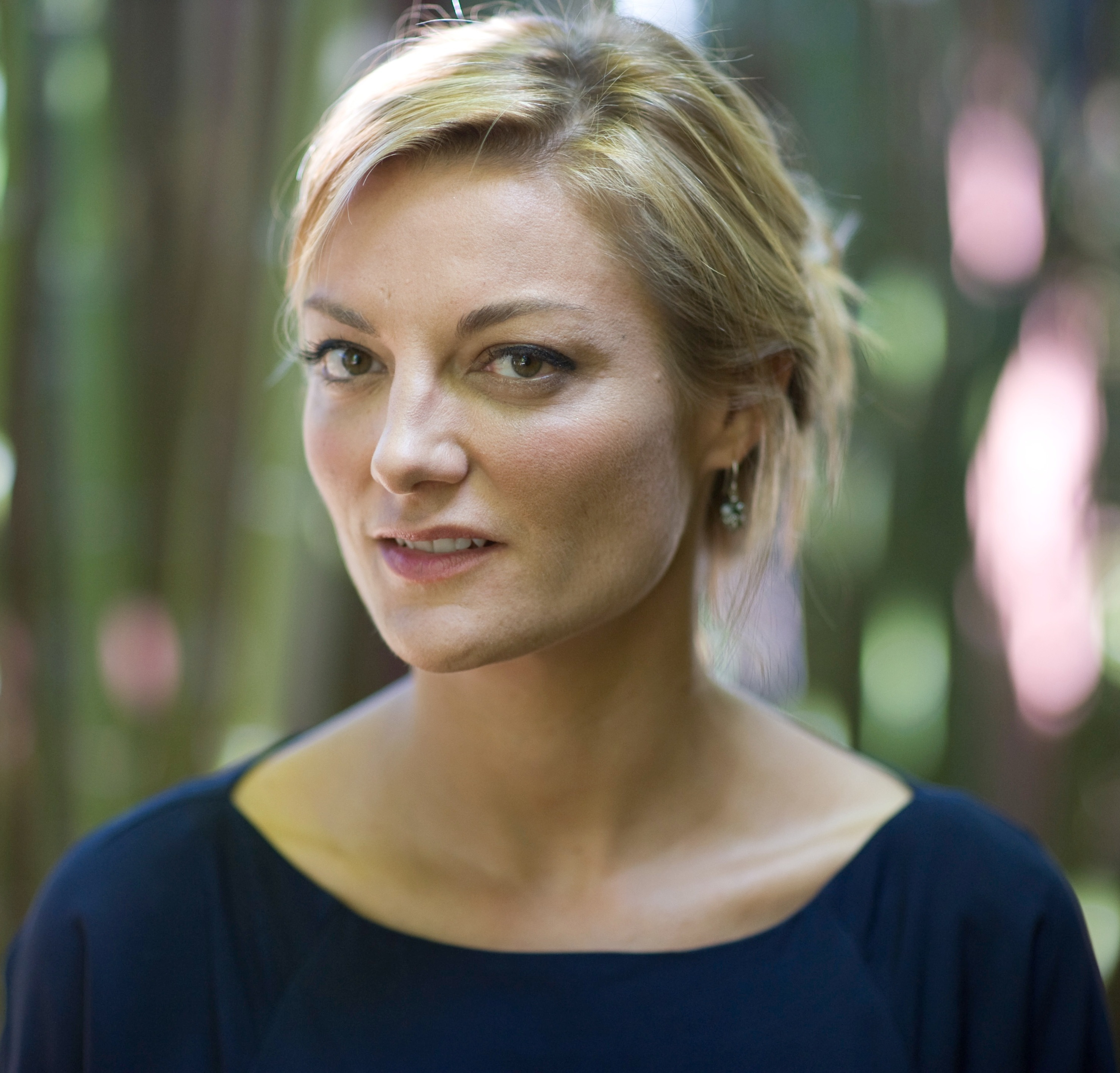
- Lucy Walker in February 2012
- Education: Oxford University; New York University Tisch School of the Arts
- Occupations: Film director; writer; producer
- Years active: 1998–present
- Website: lucywalkerfilm.com

Lucy Walker is an English film director. She has directed the feature documentaries Devil's Playground (2002), Blindsight (2006), Waste Land (2010), Countdown to Zero (2010), The Crash Reel (2013), Buena Vista Social Club: Adios (2017), Bring Your Own Brigade (2021), and the Peabody Award winning Mountain Queen: The Summits of Lhakpa Sherpa (2023). She has directed the short films The Tsunami and the Cherry Blossom (2011) and The Lion's Mouth Opens (2014). Waste Land was nominated for the Academy Award for Best Documentary Feature and The Tsunami and the Cherry Blossom was nominated for the Academy Award for Best Documentary (Short Subject).

== Film career ==
Devil's Playground, Walker's first feature documentary, examined the struggles of Amish teenagers during their experimentation period (rumspringa). It premiered at the 2002 Sundance Film Festival.

Blindsight premiered in Toronto. It is about the journey of six blind Tibetan teenagers climbing the north side of Mount Everest with blind American mountaineer Erik Weihenmayer and their teacher, Sabriye Tenberken, who founded the only school for the blind in Tibet, Braille Without Borders. Blindsight won the Audience Award at Berlin Film Festival, as did Walker's subsequent film Waste Land. Waste Land focuses on Brazilian artist Vik Muniz and a group of catadores—pickers of recyclable materials—who transform recyclable materials from the world's largest dump in Rio de Janeiro into contemporary art sold at the most prestigious auction house in London. Waste Land premiered at the 2010 Sundance Film Festival where it won the World Cinema Audience Award in documentary. Waste Land was released theatrically in the U.S. by Arthouse Films, in Canada, in the UK by E1 Entertainment, and in Australia/NZ by Hopscotch Films. In addition to being nominated for an Academy Award, Waste Land won the top prize at the 2010 IDA Documentary Awards.

Countdown to Zero, an exposé of the present-day threat of nuclear proliferation, also premiered at Sundance 2010. It also played in the Official Selection at Cannes Film Festival, before being released in the U..S by Magnolia Pictures, in the UK by Dogwoof, and in Japan by Paramount. Walker's 2011 Oscar-nominated documentary The Tsunami and the Cherry Blossom focuses on the 2011 Tōhoku earthquake and tsunami and its survivors' struggle to survive. The film premiered at the Toronto International Film Festival in 2011, and it went on to screen at festivals, including Sundance in 2012 where it won the Jury Prize in Short Filmmaking, Non-Fiction.

Walker was inspired to make the 2013 documentary The Crash Reel when she met Kevin Pearce (snowboarder) at a retreat organized by David Mayer de Rothschild. The Crash Reel premiered at Sundance on 19 January 2013 as the Opening Night Gala film. The film chronicles the rivalry between Kevin and Shaun White, which culminates in Kevin's life-changing crash. Outside featured Lucy in a cover story, "Lucy Walker Will Change Winter Sports". The Crash Reel won an audience award at South by Southwest and an Emmy Award.

Walker's 2014 documentary The Lion's Mouth Opens focuses on filmmaker-actor Marianna Palka's attempt to discover if she has inherited Huntington's disease, the incurable degenerative disorder which took Palka's father. Nick Higgins worked with Walker as cinematographer for the documentary. Walker premiered The Lion's Mouth Opens at Sundance on 26 January 2014 and it won Outstanding Achievement in Nonfiction Short Filmmaking at the Cinema Eye Honors.

Bring Your Own Brigade which follows the aftermath of the Camp Fire (2018) had its world premiere at the Sundance Film Festival on 29 January 2021. Walker served as a producer on Why Did You Kill Me? directed by Fredrick Munk, which was released on 14 April 2021 by Netflix. How to Change Your Mind, a four episode docuseries directed with Alison Ellwood, premiered on Netflix in 2022. Based on the book of the same name by Michael Pollan, each episode explores a different psychoactive substance. Mountain Queen: The Summits of Lhakpa Sherpa, about the pioneering Nepali mountaineer Lhakpa Sherpa, premiered at the Toronto International Film Festival where it was acquired for distribution by Netflix. It debuted on Netflix on July 31, 2024.

Walker's credits in television include directing over a dozen episodes of Nickelodeon's Blue's Clues, her first job out of film school, for which she was twice nominated for Emmy Awards for Outstanding Directing. Her content and commercial work includes directing "Project Daniel" for Intel, which was awarded an AICP Curator's Award and three Bronze Lions at the Cannes Festival of Creativity Walker was named one of the "Top 25 New Faces in Independent Film" by Filmmaker and called "the new Errol Morris" by The Hollywood Reporter. Variety has profiled her as a notable "Femme Filmmaker", praising her ability to connect with audiences.

== Filmography ==
=== Documentary film ===
Year	Title	Director	Producer
2023	Mountain Queen: The Summits of Lhakpa Sherpa	Yes	No
2021	Why Did You Kill Me?	No	Yes
2021	Bring Your Own Brigade	Yes	Yes
2017	Buena Vista Social Club: Adios	Yes	No
2013	The Crash Reel	Yes	Yes
2010	Waste Land	Yes	No
2010	Countdown to Zero	Yes	No
2006	Blindsight	Yes	No
2002	Devil's Playground	Yes	No

Documentary short

Year	Title	Director	Executive Producer
2017	Ram Dass, Going Home	No	Yes
2014	The Lion's Mouth Opens	Yes	No
2011	The Tsunami and the Cherry Blossom	Yes	No

=== Television ===
Year	Title	Director	Executive Producer
2022	How to Change Your Mind	Yes	Yes
2020	Defying Gravity: The Untold Story of Women's Gymnastics	Yes	No
2002	Blue's Clues	Yes	No
2001	Blue's Clues	Yes	No

== Select accolades ==
Year	Film	Award	Ceremony	Result	Ref.
2024	Mountain Queen: The Summits of Lhakpa Sherpa	Peabody Award	Peabody Awards, 85th	Won	
2024	Mountain Queen: The Summits of Lhakpa Sherpa	Outstanding Long Documentary	Emmy Awards, 46th Sports	Won	
2017	Ram Dass, Going Home	Best Documentary (Short Subject)	Academy Awards, 90th	Shortlisted	
2014	The Lion's Mouth Opens	Best Documentary (Short Subject)	Academy Awards, 87th	Shortlisted	
2014	The Crash Reel	Outstanding Informational Longform Program	Emmy Awards, 35th News and Documentary	Won	
2014	The Crash Reel	Outstanding Directorial Achievement in Documentary	Directors Guild Awards	Nominated	
2013	The Crash Reel	Audience Award	SXSW Film Festival 2013	Won	
2011	The Tsunami and the Cherry Blossom	Best Documentary (Short Subject) (with Kira Carstensen)	Academy Awards, 84th	Nominated	
2010	Waste Land	Best Documentary Feature (with Angus Aynsley)	Academy Awards, 83rd	Nominated	
2010	Waste Land	Audience Award, Panorama Best Film	Berlin International Film Festival, 60th	Won	
2010	Waste Land	Amnesty International Human Rights Award	Berlin International Film Festival, 60th	Won	
2010	Waste Land	Audience Award, Best World Cinema Documentary	Sundance Film Festival 2010	Won	
2007	Blindsight	Audience Award, Panorama	Berlin International Film Festival, 57th	Won	
2006	Blindsight	Best Documentary, Audience Award	American Film Institute Awards, 2006	Won	
2006	Blindsight	Best Documentary, British	British Independent Film Awards, 2006	Nominated	
2003	Devil's Playground	Best Documentary	Emmy Awards, 24th News and Documentary	Nominated	
2003	Devil's Playground	Outstanding Direction in a Documentary	Emmy Awards, 24th News and Documentary	Nominated	
2003	Devil's Playground	Outstanding Editing in a Documentary	Emmy Awards, 24th News and Documentary	Nominated	
2002	Devil's Playground	Best Documentary	Independent Spirit Awards, 18th	Nominated	

Year	Television	Award	Ceremony	Result	Ref.
2002	Blue's Clues	Outstanding Directing in a Children's Series	Emmy Awards, 2002 Daytime	Nominated	
2001	Blue's Clues	Outstanding Directing in a Children's Series	Emmy Awards, 2001 Daytime	Nominated	
