= Kendal Mountain Festival =

Annual event, Cumbria

- Location: Kendal, Cumbria, England
- Founded: 1980
- Festival date: November (annual)
- Language: English
- Website: www.kendalmountainfestival.com

The Kendal Mountain Festival is an annual event held in November in Kendal, Cumbria, on the edge of the English Lake District in the UK. It celebrates outdoor and adventure culture with a diverse programme of films, talks, workshops and other events.

The festival has grown to become a significant event in the international outdoor community, attracting filmmakers, athletes, writers and enthusiasts from around the world.

The current festival patrons include Sir Chris Bonington, Leo Houlding, Keme Nzerem, Louise Minchin, Aldo Kane, Graham Zimmerman and Shauna Coxsey, as well as patron of the Kendal Mountain Book Festival, Robert Macfarlane.

The directors of the festival are Steve Scott and Clive Allen. Jacqui Scott is the CEO.

== Description ==
Kendal Mountain Festival features approximately 200 events over four days, encompassing a wide range of activities. The film programme showcases over 150 international adventure films, while the speaker events feature prominent figures in the world of outdoor adventure, such as mountaineers, explorers and athletes, discussing their experiences and achievements.

The festival also includes the Basecamp Village, a central hub with exhibitors from outdoor brands and community groups, and multiple stages for talks, demonstrations and live music performances.

The Kendal Mountain Book Festival is an integral part of the festival, celebrating mountain literature and nature writing that explores the themes of adventure, landscape and environment. It runs concurrently with the film festival, featuring speakers, discussions and events focused on literary works.

A key element of the Book Festival is the presentation of the Boardman Tasker Prize for Mountain Literature, an annual award that recognises outstanding contributions to the genre. The prize commemorates the lives of Peter Boardman and Joe Tasker, British mountaineers who died on Mount Everest in 1982.

The festival invests in its community outreach and schools programme, such as "Kendal for Schools" programmes and free family adventure programme.

== History ==
The Kendal Mountain Festival was first held in October 1980 as a two-day event under the name "Kendal Mountaineering Film Festival". The original programme featured films, art exhibitions, seminars and photography centred around mountaineering and outdoor culture.

The founding organisers were Alan Evans, Jess Stock, Ian Wall, John Porter, Jim Curran and Brian Hall. Over the years, the festival has hosted talks by notable figures in climbing and mountaineering, including Yvon Chouinard, Reinhold Messner, Catherine Destivelle, Fred Beckey, Lynn Hill, Tommy Caldwell and Ueli Steck.

Since its early years, the festival has developed a reputation as a platform for mountain and outdoor films, screening titles such as The Bat and the Wicked, Five Days One Summer, Hard Grit, Touching the Void and Free Solo.

== Kendal Mountain Player ==
Launched in 2020, the Kendal Mountain Player is an online platform offering a selection of films from the festival.

== Kendal Mountain Tour ==
The Kendal Mountain Tour travels to venues across the UK each year between February and May.

== Film awards ==
The festival's film competition includes thirteen award categories, in genres such as culture, environment, action sports, exploration and short-form documentary. The Grand Prize is the festival’s highest honour. In 2021, the People’s Choice Award was introduced, based on votes cast by festival attendees throughout the event.

Grand Prize winners
Year	Film	Director
2010	The Prophet	Alastair Lee
2011	Crossing the Ditch	Greg Quail
2012	Crossing the Ice	Justin Jones
2013	The Crash Reel	Lucy Walker
2014	Valley Uprising	Peter Mortimer, Nick Rosen, Josh Lowell
2015	K2: Touching the Sky	Eliza Kubarska
2016	The Accord	RC Cone
2017	Blood Road	Nicholas Schrunk
2018	Free Solo	Elizabeth Chai Vasarhelyi, Jimmy Chin
2019	Climbing Blind	Alistair Lee
2020	Into the Storm (En la Tomenta)	Adam Brown
2021	Torn	Max Lowe
2022	The Hermit of Treig	Lizzie MacKenzie
2023	If The Streets Were On Fire	Alice Russell
2024	Mountain Queen: The Summits of Lhakpa Sherpa	Lucy Walker
2025	All The Mountains Give	Arash Rakhsha

People's Choice winners
Year	Film	Director
2021	A Woman's Place	Menna Wakeford
2022	The Last Forgotten Art	Jessie Leong
2023	The Eagle With The Sunlit Eye	Ted Simpson
2024	King of the Fells	Seth Whitfield
2025	The Edge of Existence	Aaron Wheeler
