= Braille Without Borders =

Tibet-based organization for the blind

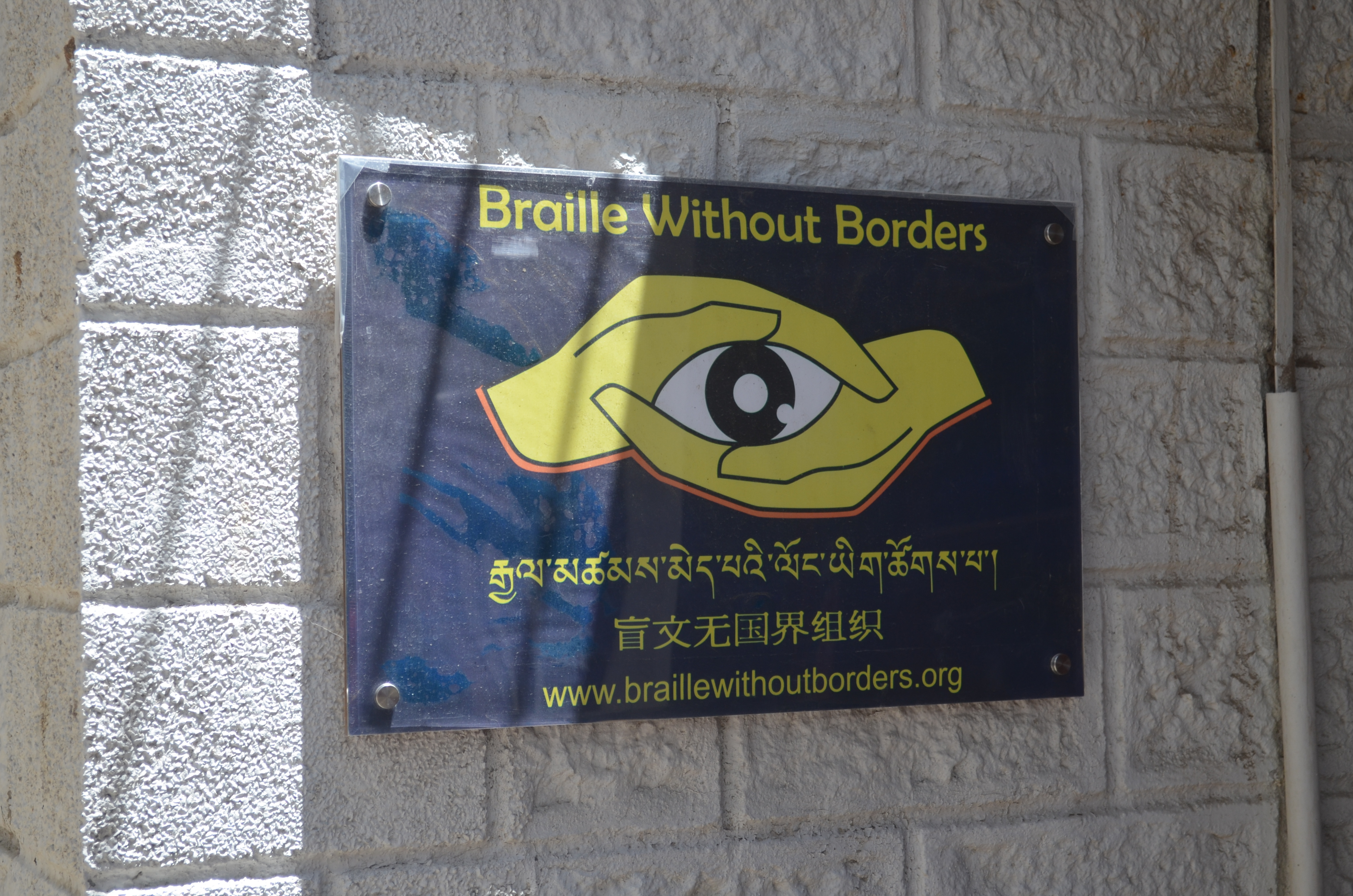
- Abbreviation: BWB
- Formation: 1998
- Founder: Sabriye Tenberken, Paul Kronenberg
- Founded at: Lhasa, Tibet, China

Braille Without Borders (BWB) is an international organisation for the blind in developing countries. It was founded in Lhasa, Tibet, by Sabriye Tenberken and Paul Kronenberg in 1998.

== Overview ==
BWB's mission is to give hope and practical skills to the blind and in particular to teach braille to the blind in developing countries; if no braille script exists for a particular language in a developing country, BWB must first develop it.

Formerly known as the Project for the Blind, Tibet, in September 2002 the project adopted the name Braille Without Borders.

== Schools and centres ==
=== Tibet T.A.R ===
- School for the blind: The first centre, a school for blind Tibetan children, was established in Lhasa in 1997.
- Massage centre: A clinical massage centre run and operated by the blind in Lhasa.
- Vocational Training Farm: A second centre, a farm and cheese factory, for the vocational training of adults has been established at Pelshong 270 km west of Lhasa near Shigatse.

In August 2017 it was made public that Chinese authorities will shut down the school for the blind as well as the vocational training farm without giving reasons.

=== India ===
- IISE: The International Institute for Social Entrepreneurs (IISE) began in January 2009. This school runs an eleven-month-long course to train both sighted and non-sighted people to establish and run their own social projects. The IISE is located at Kalliyoor on the Vellayani lakeside about 12 km from Trivandrum, the capital of Kerala, India.
- In 2011 IISE changed its name to "kanthari". A kanthari is a plant that grows wild in every backyard of Kerala, a small, spicy chili with a number of medicinal values. A kanthari is also a symbol for those who dare to challenge harmful traditions and the status quo, who have fire in their belly and many innovative ideas to make a positive difference. A kanthari will become the symbol of a new type of leader, a leader from the margins of society. The kanthari leadership course lasts seven months andalways starts in May.

== Achievements and events ==
In 2004, Paul and Sabriye and a team of their blind students from Lhasa embarked upon the Climbing Blind expedition in Tibet under the leadership of blind Everest mountaineer Erik Weihenmayer. The prize-winning documentary Blindsight about this expedition was released worldwide to cinemas in 2006.

== Literature ==
- Tenberken S. (2003) My Path Leads To Tibet, Arcade Publishing. ISBN 1-55970-658-9
- Tenberken S. (late 2006 or early 2007) The Seventh Year - From Tibet to India

== Media ==
- 2000 Documentary film titled Mit anderen Augen (English: With Other Eyes) about Braille Without Borders. (This won Sabriye the 2000 Charity Bambi Award)
- 2005-08-15 Sabriye and Paul were guests on a talk show for CCTV 9 in Beijing, China
- 2005-10-17 Sabriye was a guest on The Oprah Winfrey Show titled 8 Women Oprah Wants You to Know, segment Phenomenal Females: Sabriye Tenberken's Journey
- 2006 release of the documentary film Blindsight about the climbing project in the Himalayas with Erik Weihenmayer and students from the School for the Blind in Lhasa.
