= Jardim Gramacho =

Coordinates: 22.759324°S 43.285925°W

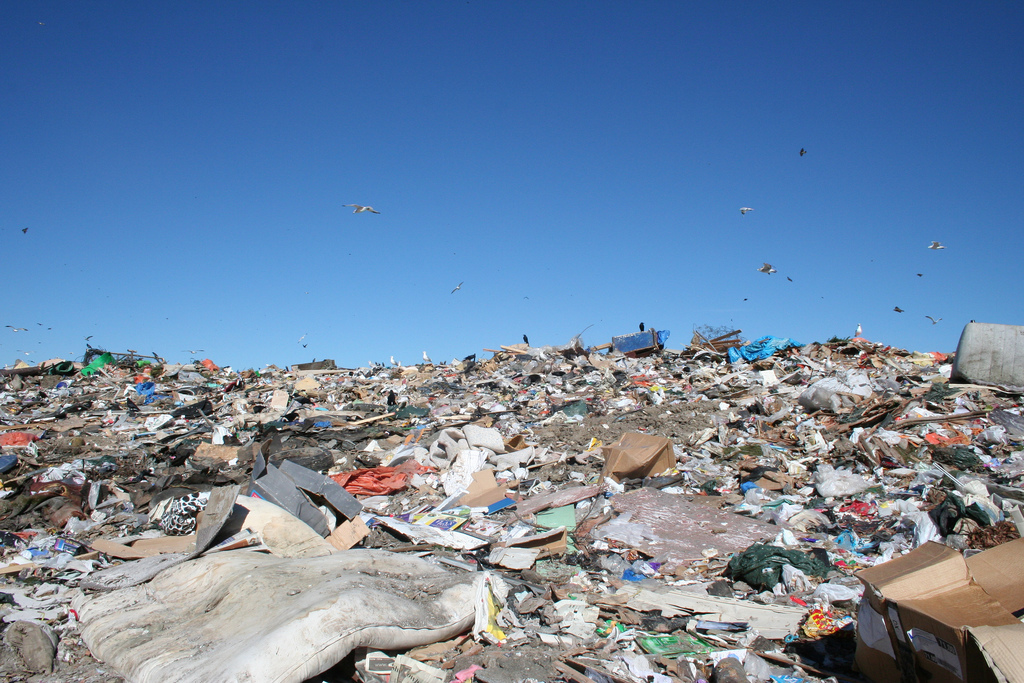
Part of the Jardim Gramacho landfill.

Jardim Gramacho (Gramacho Gardens in English) is a neighborhood in the city of Duque de Caxias and the state of Rio de Janeiro.

== Landfill ==
Jardim Gramacho was the site of one of the largest landfills in the world. It closed in June 2012 after 34 years of operation.

The dump was started on an ecologically-sensitive wetland in the 1970s adjacent to Guanabara Bay.

The Associação dos Catadores do Aterro Metropolitano de Jardim Gramacho (Association of Collectors of the Metropolitan Landfill of Jardim Gramacho) is an organization of "pickers" who sort through waste in the landfill, finding recyclables as a means of survival. The 2010 film Waste Land documented two years of work by Brazilian contemporary modern artist Vik Muniz in creating art with the co-operation of the recycling pickers at the landfill.

== See also ==
- Landfill gas emission reduction in Brazil
- Environment of Brazil
