= Rhoda Trooboff =

American educator, publisher, and author

Rhoda Trooboff is an American educator, publisher, and author.

== Education ==
Trooboff studied at Wellesley College where she earned an undergraduate degree in English. She got a MAT degree from Harvard's Graduate School of Education.

== Career ==
Trooboff worked as a teacher in Arlington, VA public schools. She was the head of the English department at the National Cathedral School in Washington, D.C. She also serves as a child protection mediator in the DC Superior Courts and volunteered as a reader at Learning Ally, an organization that records and reads books for the blind and dyslexic.

== Publications ==
In 2005, she founded Tenley Circle Press, a micro-publishing house in Washington, DC, for children's books.

Her writings include:

Ben, The Bells and the Peacocks (Tenley Circle Press, 2006)

A Book for Elie (Tenley Circle Press, 2008)

Punkinhead's Veggie Adventure and the Strange Contraption in the Kitchen (Tenley Circle Press, 2013)

In 2010, Trooboff edited We Grew It: Let's Eat It (Tenley Circle Press, 2010), and was interviewed by NPR about her educational gardening work.

In 2014, Trooboff wrote her first novel, Correspondence Course: The Bathsua Project.

Her books were the only publications featured in the 2020 Seymour Art festival of the Garrett County Arts Council & Simon Pearce Partnership.

== Personal life ==
Trooboff is married to Peter, a lawyer. They have two daughters and five grandchildren. She is an avid gardener and member of the DC Neighborhood Farm Initiative.
