= Why Did You Kill Me? =

2021 American documentary film

- Official poster
- Directed by: Fredrick Munk
- Produced by: Fredrick Munk; Julian Cautherley; Lucy Walker
- Cinematography: Douglas Brian Miller; Carmen Delaney
- Edited by: Barry Poltermann; Matthew Prekop
- Music by: Matt Morton
- Production company: Tree Tree Tree
- Distributed by: Netflix
- Release date: April 14, 2021 (United States)
- Running time: 83 minutes
- Country: United States
- Languages: English; Spanish

Why Did You Kill Me? is a 2021 American documentary film directed and produced by Fredrick Munk. The film follows Belinda Lane as she tracks down those involved in the murder of Crystal Theobald, her daughter, using MySpace.

It was released on April 14, 2021, by Netflix.

== Synopsis ==
Belinda Lane tracks down those involved in the murder of Crystal Theobald, her daughter, using MySpace.

== Release ==
The film was released on April 14, 2021, by Netflix.

== Reception ==
Why Did You Kill Me? holds a 70% approval rating on review aggregator website Rotten Tomatoes, based on 10 reviews, with a weighted average of 6.90/10.
