= Associação dos Catadores do Aterro Metropolitano de Jardim Gramacho =

Associação dos Catadores do Aterro Metropolitano de Jardim Gramacho (Association of Collectors of the Metropolitan Landfill of Jardim Gramacho) is an organization of "pickers" who sort through garbage finding recyclables as a means of survival. The association is led by president Tião Santos, and based in the landfill Jardim Gramacho, outside Rio de Janeiro, Brazil. Its members are paid in exchange for the recyclables that they collect, sort, and trade. The Jardim Gramacho landfill has one of the highest rates of recycling due to the entire economy generated by the association.

More recently, the ACAMJG has gained more attention, due to the documentary Waste Land, exposing a community and art project led by artist Vik Muniz. The documentary highlights Muniz' two-year visit to Jardim Gramacho, where he collected recyclables with the ACAMJG and, with their help, photographed works made entirely of recyclables. The photographs were both sold to exhibits and also auctioned, for a total of $300,000 US, all donated to the association.
