= Waste Land (film) =

2010 documentary film by Lucy Walker

- Promotional film poster
- Directed by: Lucy Walker; João Jardim (co-director); Karen Harley (co-director)
- Produced by: Angus Aynsley; Hank Levine
- Starring: Vik Muniz
- Cinematography: Dudu Miranda; Heloísa Passos (co-DoP); Aaron Phillips (co-DoP); Ernesto Herrmann (co-DoP)
- Edited by: Pedro Kos
- Music by: Moby
- Production companies: Almega Projects; O2 Filmes; Intelligent Media
- Distributed by: Midas Filmes
- Release date: 24 January 2010 (Sundance)
- Running time: 99 minutes
- Countries: Brazil; United Kingdom
- Languages: Portuguese; English

Waste Land (Portuguese: Lixo Extraordinário, lit. 'Extraordinary Garbage') is a 2010 British-Brazilian documentary film directed by Lucy Walker, co-directed by João Jardim and Karen Harley, and produced by Angus Aynsley and Hank Levine. The music for the film was created by Moby, who is a friend and frequent collaborator of Walker. The film follows artist Vik Muniz as he travels to the world's largest landfill in Jardim Gramacho, just outside Rio de Janeiro, to collaborate with a lively group of "catadores" (workers who salvage recyclable materials from the garbage) to make contemporary art using some of the materials they have "picked". Muniz donated the proceeds from the sale of his pictures of the artworks to the ACAMJG (Associação dos Catadores do Aterro Metropolitano de Jardim Gramacho, or Association of Pickers of the Metropolitan Landfill of Jardim Gramacho), which is a co-operative founded and led by Sebastião "Tião" Carlos Dos Santos, one of the catadores involved in the art project; the prize money from the awards won by the film was also donated to the organization.

The film premiered at the Sundance Film Festival on 24 January 2010. It was distributed by Arthouse Films in the US, Entertainment One in Canada, Hopscotch Films in Australia and New Zealand, and Midas Filmes in Portugal. The film won over 50 film awards, including the International Documentary Association's Best Documentary Award (which was handed to director Lucy Walker inside a garbage bag), and was nominated for Best Documentary Feature at the 83rd Academy Awards.

== Reception ==
Critical response to the film was almost unanimously positive. On the review aggregator website Rotten Tomatoes, it has a 100% approval rating based on 70 reviews, with an average score of 8.1/10; the site's "critics consensus" states: "Waste Land begins with an eco-friendly premise, but quickly transforms into an uplifting portrait of the power of art and the dignity of the human spirit." On Metacritic, the film has a weighted average score of 78 out of 100 based on reviews from 20 critics, indicating "generally favorable reviews".

This film was invited to screen at festivals and special events around the world, and received over 50 awards. As the only documentary from 2010 to receive a 100% approval rating on Rotten Tomatoes, it won the Golden Tomato Award as the best-reviewed documentary of the year.

== International titles ==
- The Portuguese-language title of the film is Lixo Extraordinário ("Extraordinary Garbage"), which is a pun referring to the labels on Brazilian sanitation trucks containing special waste.
- The Spanish-language title is El Reino de la Basura ("The Kingdom of Garbage").
- The film's French distributors, Eurozoom, chose to keep the English title of Waste Land, while adding the subtitle "de la Poubelle au Musée" ("From the Trash to the Museum").

== See also ==
- ACAMJG – the association of Jardim Gramacho's recyclables pickers that is featured in the film
- Isle of Flowers – a 1989 Brazilian short film by Jorge Furtado in which a tomato goes to a landfill in Porto Alegre
- The Gleaners and I – a 2000 documentary by Agnès Varda about various types of gleaning
- List of films with a 100% rating on Rotten Tomatoes, a film review aggregator website
