= Kira Carstensen =

American film and television producer

- Occupation: Producer
- Years active: 1995-present

Kira Carstensen is a film and television producer.

On January 24, 2012, she was nominated for an Academy Award for the film The Tsunami and the Cherry Blossom.
