= Buena Vista Social Club: Adios =

2017 film by Lucy Walker

- Theatrical release poster
- Directed by: Lucy Walker
- Produced by: Christine Cowin; Zak Kilberg; Victor Moyers
- Starring: Omara Portuondo; Jesus "Aguaje" Ramos; Manuel "Guajiro" Mirabal; Barbarito Torres; Guajirito Mirabal; Eliades Ochoa
- Edited by: Tyler Temple Higgins; Pablo Proenza
- Production companies: Blink TV; Broad Green Pictures; Convergent Media
- Distributed by: Broad Green Pictures (United States); StudioCanal (United Kingdom)
- Release date: May 26, 2017
- Running time: 111 minutes
- Countries: United States; United Kingdom; Cuba
- Language: English
- Box office: $476,720

Buena Vista Social Club: Adios is a 2017 documentary film directed by Lucy Walker. It is a follow-up to the 1999 documentary Buena Vista Social Club about Cuban music. The film was released in theaters on May 26, 2017.

== Synopsis ==
Buena Vista Social Club: Adios takes place sixteen years after the 1999 documentary Buena Vista Social Club. It follows five original band members from the first film as they go on one final tour that ends in their hometown of Havana, Cuba. The musicians recall their ups and downs over the years, including award-winning performances and losing many of their fellow band members.
