= The Tsunami and the Cherry Blossom =

- Directed by: Lucy Walker
- Produced by: Kira Carstensen
- Music by: Moby
- Production companies: Supply & Demand Integrated
- Distributed by: HBO
- Release date: September 12, 2011 (Toronto)
- Running time: 39 minutes
- Countries: United States; Japan
- Language: Japanese

The Tsunami and the Cherry Blossom (Japanese: 津波そして桜) is a 2011 American-Japanese documentary film directed by Lucy Walker. The film was nominated for the 2012 Academy Award for Best Documentary (Short Subject).

== Synopsis ==
The film follows survivors of the 2011 Tōhoku earthquake and tsunami as they prepare for the beginning of cherry blossom season.

== Production ==
Walker's original intention was to film a documentary about the cherry blossom and that after the 2011 tsunami she initially reconsidered her decision to create a film of any nature. In an interview with Realscreen, Walker stated "My first thought was, ‘Gosh, I can’t do this now.’ But then my second thought was that actually, now is a more important time than ever to show our solidarity with the Japanese people." She did not plan on using the cherry blossom as a metaphor, but that "the film’s subjects picked up on it as an obvious metaphor anyway". Walker had concerns that she would find it difficult to conduct interviews as an outsider to the country, but "found people really wanted to tell their story. They would come across the post-apocalyptic looking landscape especially to find us."

== The Cherry Blossom in Japanese Culture ==
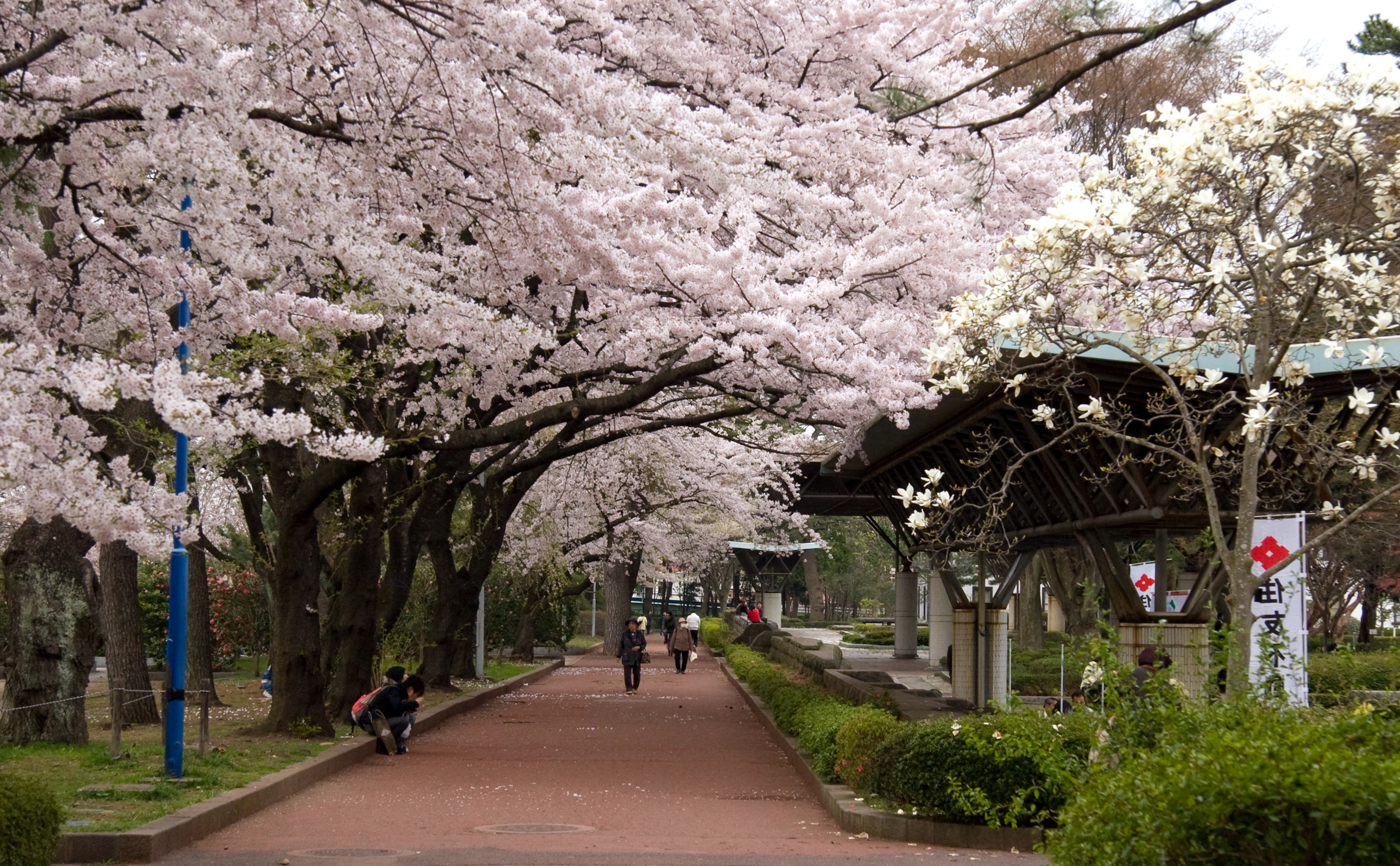
Cherry blossom season in Sendai

Japanese people treat the cherry blossoms as a symbol of hope and beauty, and Japanese non-profit organizations that plant and encourage others to plant sakura trees were founded after the 2011 disaster.

== Awards ==
Award	Category	Recipient	Result
84th Academy Awards	Academy Award for Best Documentary (Short Subject)		Nominated
2012 Sundance Film Festival	Jury prize for short film, non-fiction		Won

== Reception ==
Critical reception for The Tsunami and the Cherry Blossom has been positive, with Bruce Barcott calling the movie's Oscar nomination "a well-deserved nod" and stating that the movie "captures the Japanese experience of the March 11, 2011, tsunami with a quiet beauty, power, and dignity". Film Journal International also reviewed the film, praising Walker's directing and the use of musical and artistic touches. Roger Ebert gave the short 3 stars, stating that some of the footage was "overwhelming".

On November 28, 2011, REACT to FILM screened The Tsunami and the Cherry Blossom at the SoHo House in West Hollywood, CA and moderated a Q&A with director Lucy Walker, Aki Mizutani and Kira Carstensen.

Critical reception in Japan has also been positive, with Cinema Today Japan acknowledging the short's Academy Awards nomination.
