= Matthew Orr (businessman) =

British businessman

- Born: Matthew Nicholson Orr; United Kingdom
- Education: Bedford School
- Occupations: Entrepreneur, investor
- Years active: 1989–present
- Spouse: Sybil Robson Orr (2001–present)

Matthew Orr is a British executive and founder of a charitable foundation.

== Biography ==
In 1989 Orr co-founded Killik & Co., and was its managing partner and chief executive officer until 2006. Orr is married to Sybil Robson Orr.

He co-founded The Robson Orr TenTen Award, commonly called TenTen, In, 1996 Orr co-founded The Orr Mackintosh Foundation, also known as Sharegift,

Orr was awarded the Beacon Fellowship Prize in 2006 for his work with Sharegift.
