= Vik Muniz =

Brazilian artist and photographer (born 1961)

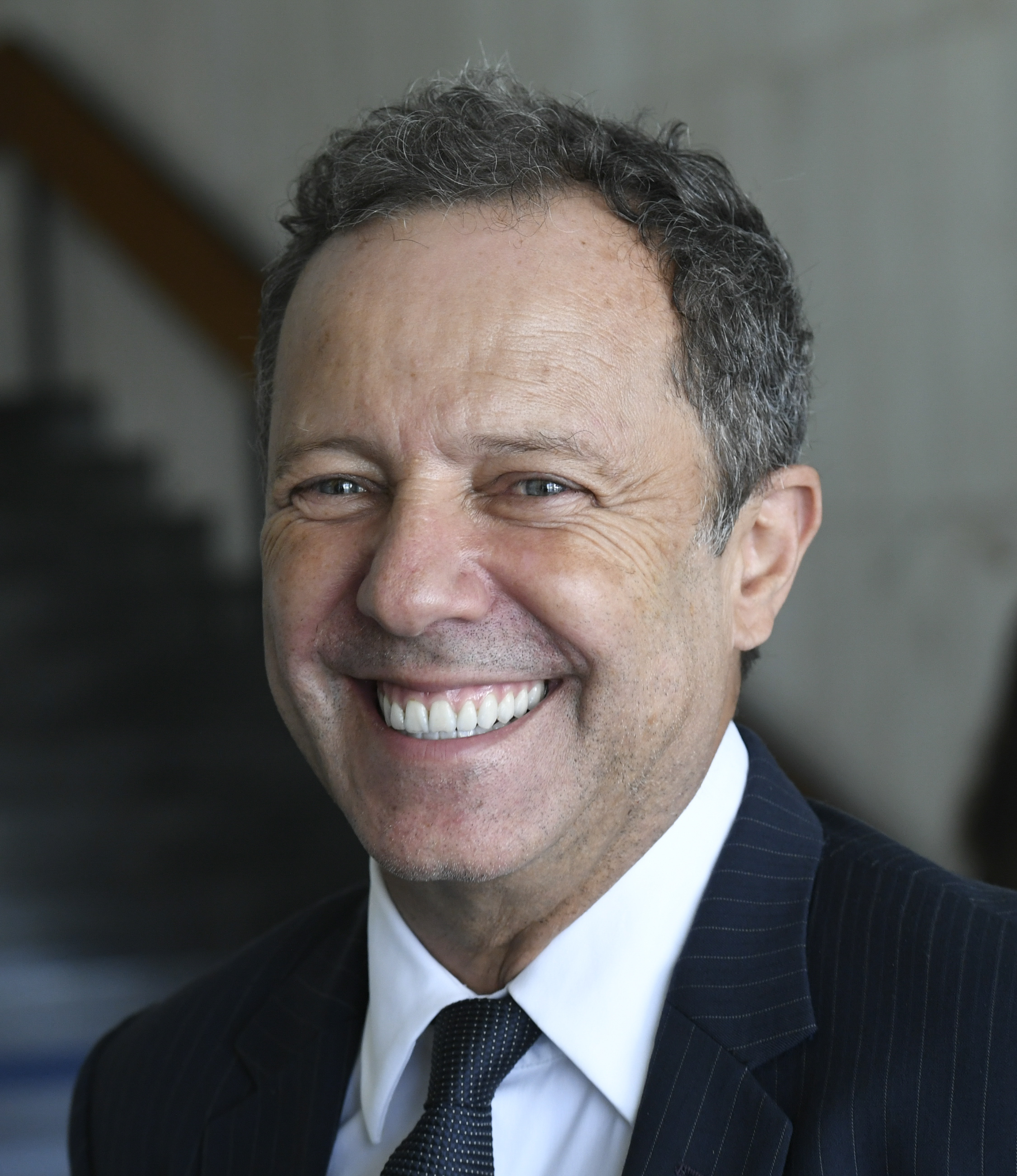
- Muniz in 2024
- Born: Vicente José de Oliveira Muniz; December 20, 1961 (age 64); São Paulo, Brazil
- Known for: Visual art

Vik Muniz (Portuguese pronunciation: [ˈvik muˈnis]; born 1961) is a Brazilian artist and photographer. His work has been met with both commercial success and critical acclaim, and has been exhibited worldwide. In 1998, he participated in the 24th International Biennale in São Paulo, and in 2001, he represented Brazil at the 49th Biennale in Venice, Italy.

== Early life ==
Vik Muniz was born in 1961 in São Paulo, Brazil, as the only child of Maria Celeste, a telephone operator, and Vincente Muniz, a restaurant waiter. In his memoir, Muniz recalled struggling with writing in school which is why he turned to visuals to communicate his thoughts. At the age of 14, his math teacher recommended him to enter an art contest. He won and was awarded a partial scholarship to an art studio.

At the age of 18, Muniz got his first job working in the advertising industry in Brazil, redesigning billboards for higher readability. While on the way to his first black-tie gala, Muniz witnessed and attempted to break up a street fight, where he was accidentally shot in the leg by one of the brawlers. He was paid by the shooter to not press charges and used the money to travel to the USA, Chicago, in 1983. In Chicago, Muniz worked at a local supermarket cleaning the parking lot while he attended night school to study English. In the English class, he learned Polish, Italian, Spanish, and Korean without any improvements to his English vocabulary. Later, Muniz attended culinary and carpentry classes where he learned most of his English.

Muniz took his first trip to New York in 1984 and moved there just two months after that. His friend lent him a studio where he started his career as a sculptor. Muniz was 28 when he had his first solo exhibit in 1989.

== Work and career ==
Action Photo, After Hanz Namuth, 1997

In the 1980s, he photographed drawings and subtly altered the images, softening their appearance. To unify the series, he printed the photographs using a halftone screen, similar to those employed in publishing. This synthesis brought Muniz's memories of iconic images back to their original form photographs printed in halftone.

Through this artistic process, viewers recognize the images while understanding that they function more as interpretations of thought than as exact replicas. Muniz’s work encourages reflection on the reliability of memory in relation to images and events.

By the mid-1990s, Muniz had begun to integrate unconventional everyday materials into his artistic process, as in his most well-known bodies of work Pictures of Chocolate series of 1997, rendered in chocolate sauce. The artist borrowed from popular culture and Old Masters artists such as Georges Seurat and Vincent Van Gogh to make his works more familiar. He called this approach the “worst possible illusion.” Action Photo, after Hans Namuth (1997) is from this series. In 2010, Muniz created Pictures of Cars (after Ed Ruscha) as a commentary on Los Angeles Car Culture, utilizing various car parts to emulate such Ruscha masterpieces as Standard Station and Norm's on Fire.

== Social and environmental projects ==
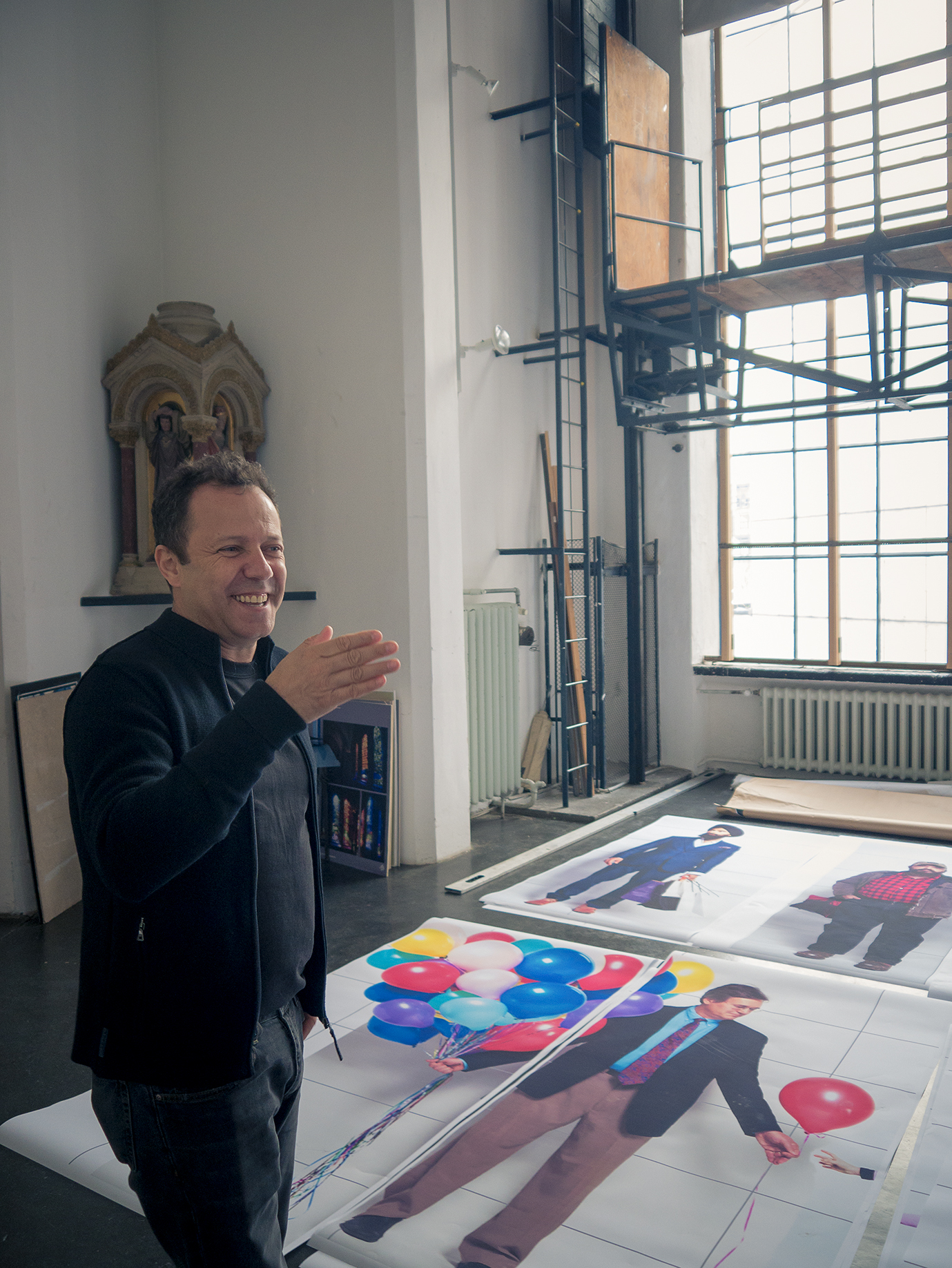
Vik Muniz with his Perfect Strangers photographs, a project for MTA on 72nd Street, 2016

Beyond his artistic exploration, Muniz is committed to the belief that art can be a catalyst for positive change in the world and should not remain exclusive to elitist circles. His work often serves as commentary on global social and environmental issues, frequently accompanied by documentary reports that shed light on social inequality, poverty, and the lack of support for vulnerable groups within society.

Muniz turned toward socially-conscious subject matter in the mid-1990s. In 1997 a series of portraits Sugar Children (1996), depicting children living on sugar plantations on the island of Saint Kitts were included in the Museum of Modern Art’s legendary New Photography 13 exhibition alongside Rineke Dijikstra, An-My Le, and Kunié Sugiura.

In 2006, Muniz created the series Pictures of Junk - monumental photographic images appropriating the renowned works by the old masters united by the common theme of ancient mythology, which are made from trash. In 2008 he continued with the series Pictures of Garbage.

Muniz donated the profits from his Pictures of Garbage series, close to $50,000 of which came from the sale of Marat (Sebastiao) at an auction in the UK, to the workers collective Associação dos Catadores do Aterro Metropolitano de Jardim Gramacho (Association of Collectors of the Metropolitan Landfill of Jardim Gramacho).

In 2010, Muniz was featured in the documentary film Waste Land. Directed by Lucy Walker, the film highlights Muniz's work in Jardim Gramacho garbage dump. Throughout the film, Muniz works with the pickers to create a series of works using materials from the landfill, such as paper, plastic, and metal. The resulting large-scale photographs serve as a powerful commentary on the environmental impact of waste and the social injustice faced by waste pickers. This project not only showcases the incredible artistic talent of Vik Muniz, but also highlights the importance of using art as a tool for social and environmental activism. Through his cooperation with the garbage pickers, Muniz raises awareness about the dignity and resilience of these marginalized individuals, as well as the pressing environmental issues that they confront on a daily basis. It had a greater impact on the public, and as a result, by June 2012, the landfill was closed down. The film was nominated to the Academy Award for Best Documentary Feature at the 83rd Academy Awards and won several prizes at the Toronto, Berlin and Sundance film festivals.

In 2014 Muniz together with Juan Rendón directed a documentary This Is Not a Ball which narrates the story of how a small round object such as a soccer ball can transform the lives of individuals and communities around the world. Muniz met with representatives of various groups: members of the largest football clubs, social activists and distinguished scientists.

In 2011, he was designated UNESCO Goodwill Ambassador for his use of arts education as a driving force for social inclusion and sustainability.

== Publications ==
- Clayton Days – Published by Frick Art & Historical Center, 2000. ISBN 0970342500
- Jelly, Garbage + Toys: Making Pictures with Vik Muniz – Published by Harry N. Abrams, 2017. ISBN 1419725750
- Natura Pictrix: Interviews and Essays on Photography – Published by New York : Edgewise, 2003. ISBN 189320717X
- Vik Muniz: Model Pictures – Published by The Menil Foundation, 2002. ISBN 9780939594535
- Vik Muniz – Published by Gary Tatintsian Gallery, 2007.
- Vik Muniz: Reflex: A Vik Muniz Primer. – Published by Aperture, 2005. ISBN 9781931788403
- Vik Muniz: Verso – Published by Verlag für moderne Kunst, 2019 ISBN 9782330004576

== Curatorial projects ==
- Buzz. Curated by Vik Muniz, Galeria Nara Roesler (Roesler Hotel #21), São Paulo, Brazil. December 1, 2012 – February 16, 2013.
- Rio de Janeiro Art Week, Rio de Janeiro, Brazil. July 22 – 29, 2010.
- Robert Mapplethorpe. Curated by Vik Muniz. Fortes Vilaça Gallery. São Paulo, Brazil. March 4 – April 9, 2009.
- Artist’s Choice: Vik Muniz, Rebus. MoMA – Museum of Modern Art. New York, NY. December 11, 2008 – February 23, 2009.
- Haptic: Three Brazilian and Three Japanese Artists. Tokyo Wonder Site. Hongo, Tokyo, Japan. November 22, 2008 – January 12, 2009.
- Robert Mapplethorpe. Curated by Vik Muniz. Fortes Vilaça Gallery, São Paulo, Brazil. March 4 – April 9, 2006.
- Identity V. Curated by Hiroshi Minamishima. Nichido Contemporary Art. Tokyo, Japan. June 26 – July 25, 2005.
- L’Empire bresilien et ses photograhes: collections de la Bibliotheque nationale du Brésil et de L’Institute Moreira Salles. “L’horizont Perdu.” Musée d’Orsay, Paris. 2005.
- Vik Muniz. Curated by Miguel Fernandez-Cid. Indianapolis Museum of Contemporary Art. Indianapolis, IN. February – March, 2003.
- Making it Real. Catalogue ed. Independent Incorporated, NY. ICI – Independent Curators International, 1997 (traveling exhibition).

== Awards ==
- 2013 – Crystal Award by the World Economic Forum. Davos-Klosters, Switzerland.
- 2010 – Honored with the Ordem do Ipiranga by the governor José Serra. São Paulo, Brazil, March 17.
- 2009 – Honored with the Medalha da Inconfidência by the governor of Minas Gerais, Mr. Aécio Neves. Minas Gerais, Brazil, April 21.
- 2009 – Honored with the Prêmio Cidadão Carioca by the State of Rio de Janeiro, Rio de Janeiro, Brazil.
- 2008 – Honored at CITYarts’ 40th Anniversary sponsored by Dr. Miriam & Sheldon G. Adelson, Candia Fisher, Winston Fisher, and chaired by Jane Holzer. New York, NY.
- 2007 – Society for News Design Annual Creative Competition Award of Excellence in the category of Magazine Cover Design for the cover of The New York Times Magazine.
- 2005 – Premio Villa de Madrid de Fotografía “Kaulak" awarded by the Ayuntamiento de Madrid, Madrid, Spain.
- 2005 – International Artist Award granted by the Anderson Ranch Arts Center, Snowmass Village, Colorado.
- 1999 – Líderes Latinoamericanos para el Nuevo Milenio. CNN Time. NY, USA.
- 1998 – Best Photography Exhibition, Second Place: Vik Muniz: Seeing is Believing. Awarded by The International Center of Photography and curated by Charles Stainback.
