= Kanthari international =

Coordinates: 8°26′19.51″N 76°59′32″E

kanthari
- Founded: 2005
- Founder: Sabriye Tenberken, Paul Kronenberg
- Type: Professional Organization
- Purpose: Leadership Training
- Location: Vellayani Lake, Kerala, India
- Origins: Braille Without Borders
- Region served: Worldwide
- Members: 20-30
- Employees: 23
- Volunteers: 3
- Students: (20-25)

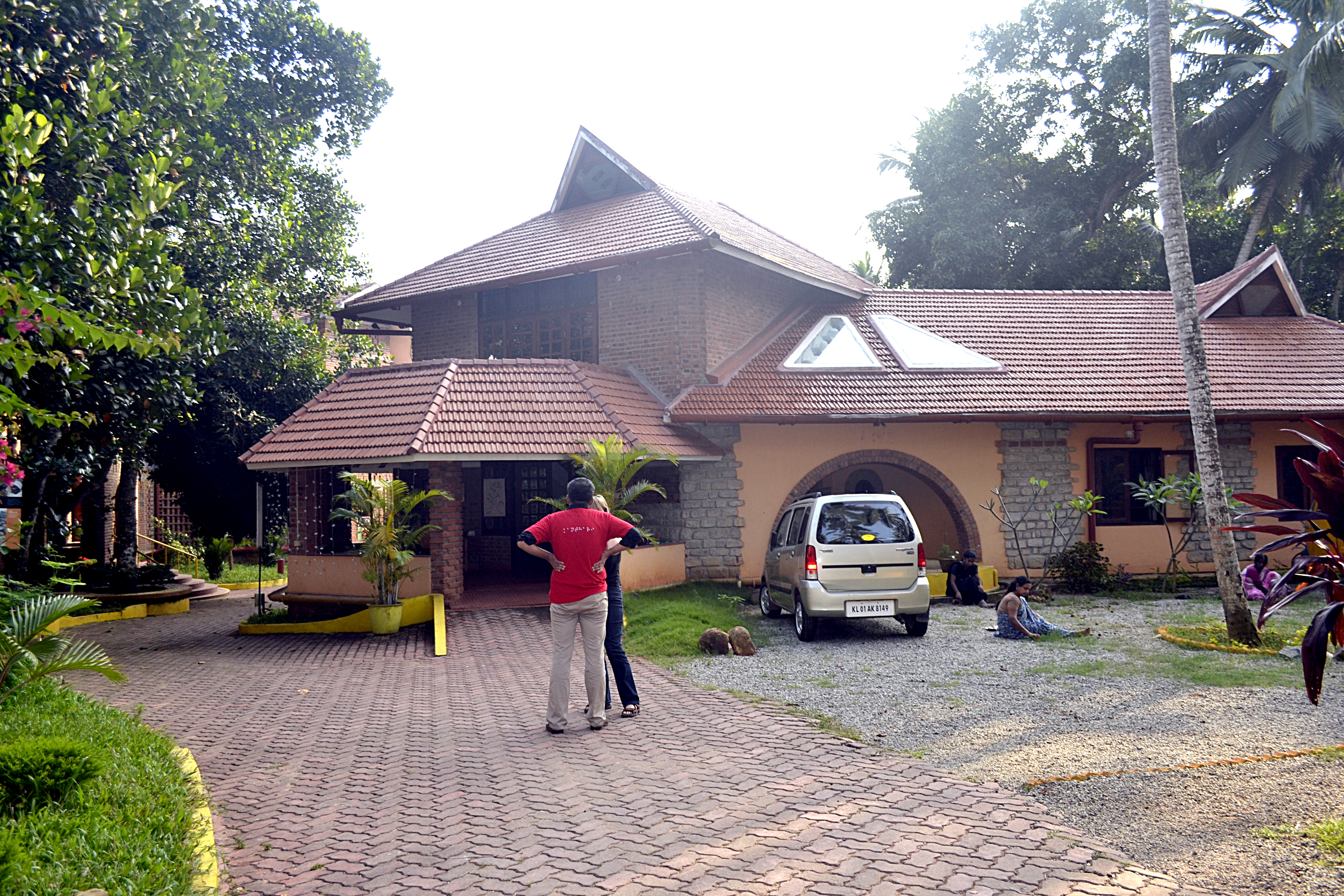
A view of the campus office from the front entrance

kanthari is an educational and training institute at Thiruvananthapuram, Kerala, India. It was co-founded by Sabriye Tenberken and Paul Kronenberg in 2005, with the first members jointing in 2009, as an extension of their pioneering project Braille without borders. The not-for-profit institute aims to identify and train persons who have had to face adverse social conditions including physical disabilities, poverty, war strife. Its original official name was "International Institute for Social Entrepreneurship". However, to avoid the common notion of monetary gains using the word 'entrepreneurship', the founders renamed the project as kanthari. The initial lower case letters used in the name are intentionally kept as a symbol of their ideology.

== kanthari, the word ==
'kanthari' (Malayalam: കാന്താരി) is the name of a pepper chilly that is indigenous to the land of Kerala state, India. Kanthari is known for its extreme hotness despite its small size. But it also has numerous medical values like lowering the blood pressure etc.. According to Sabriye, the head of the institute, the spice is very representative of the 'small' people who in fact, with the right motivation and preparation, can bring in a drastic and innovative change within the society.

As a symbol of the institute's deterrence to prejudices and normally accepted conventions, kanthari international is spelt and written with all letters in lowercase.

== Founders ==
=== Sabriye Tenberken ===
Sabriye Tenberken, (German) became blind at the age of 12. Due to her interest in development work she studied Central Asian Sciences at Bonn University focusing on Tibetology, philosophy and sociology. In order to be able to read and write Tibetan texts she developed the Tibetan Braille Script.

=== Paul Kronenberg ===
Paul Kronenberg (Dutch) has worked for various international Non Governmental Organisations in Africa, Asia and Eastern Europe. He completed his studies in the areas of mechanical engineering, computer science, commercial technology and communication system science.

== Program ==
The kanthari addresses to people that have overcome significant life challenges ranging from vision impairment, disability, poverty, war, discrimination and exploitation in order to help them in setting up their own social project. It trains its participants in skills like management, public speaking, communication, leadership, fund raising, budgeting, bookkeeping, marketing and computer usage. The program takes 12 months.

== Impact of kanthari ==
Jane Waithera is from Kenya. Jane is a person living with Albinism{Albinism is a defect of melanin production that results in little or no color (pigment) in the skin, hair, and eyes}. This means that she lacks melanin and her skin is white. In east Africa it is believed that possessing a body part of an Albino brings good luck. Therefore, Albinos are killed and their body parts sold for a high price. Jane is a 2009 kanthari graduate. Since her return home she has been fighting for the rights of Albinos. Over the past fourteen years kanthari trained 258 participants from 53 countries. The graduates have started over 160 projects and initiatives and reached thousands of beneficiaries.

== Location ==
The institute is located at a campus near the village Vellayani, close to Thiruvananthapuram, the capital of Kerala state. It consists of several eco-friendly buildings.
