= This Is Not a Ball =

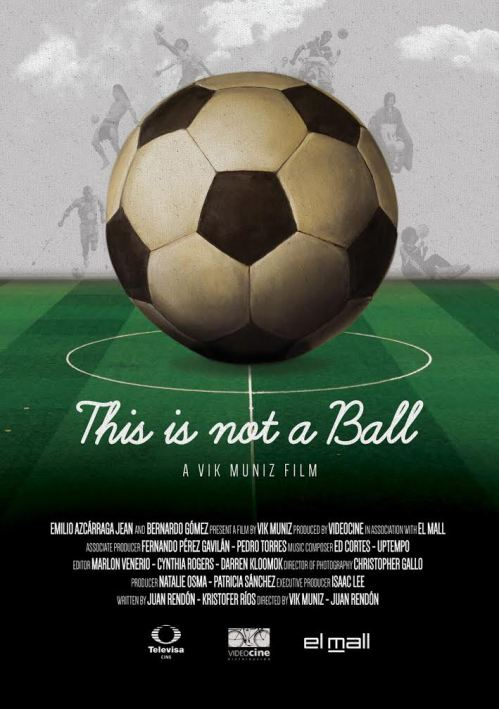
- Directed by: Vik Muniz & Juan Rendon
- Produced by: Emilio Azcárraga and Bernardo Gómez
- Starring: Vik Muniz
- Release date: June 6, 2014
- Running time: 99 minutes
- Country: United States
- Languages: English, Spanish and Portuguese

This Is Not a Ball is a feature documentary film premiered in June 2014 produced by Emilio Azcarraga Jean and Bernardo Gomez and El Mall and Videocine as producing companies. The documentary is directed by Brazilian artist Vik Muniz and Juan Rendón. The documentary narrates the story of how a small round object such as a soccer ball can transform the lives of individuals and communities around the world. It explores the passion for soccer in countries such as Brazil, Mexico, Germany, Sierra Leone, China and Pakistan. Throughout the documentary, there are interviews with children from the favelas of Rio de Janeiro, with American astrophysicist Neil deGrasse Tyson and other personalities.

== Synopsis ==
Brazilian artist Vik Muniz traveled the world and witnessed how can a small round object transform the lives of individuals and communities. This is not a Ball explores the passion for football and tries to replicate the impact of the ball on a larger scale trying to connect individuals with their society or even greater purposes. These endeavors range from Pakistan, Mexico, Brazil, China and all the way to Sierra Leone searching for the meaning and importance of a soccer ball in different societies. The film includes interviews with personalities like Neil De Grasse Tyson.

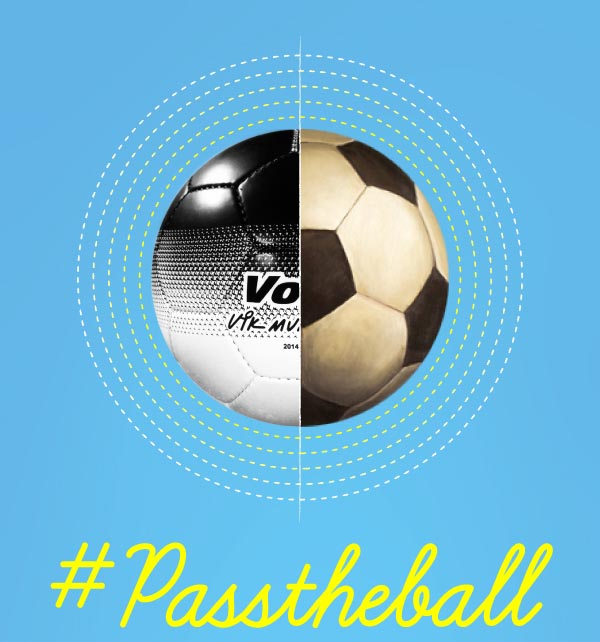

== Impact ==
With the support of the globally recognized social organization Fundación Televisa, and global development experts: Streetfootballworld, #Passtheball undertakes the launch of a global initiative for social good. Twelve organizations that focus on football as a tool of change will benefit from the collective work. Vik Muniz makes the viewer an active participant in the film by presenting opportunities to collaborate both during and after the movie plays. Over 20,000 soccer balls were used to construct two art installation pieces in Brazil and Mexico. Those soccer balls will be repurposed and sold as part of This is not a Ball's fundraising effort, #Passtheball—a social movement that enables the documentary to transcend the two-dimensional cinematic experience by impacting the world around us.
