= Simon Pearce =

American glassmaker and potter

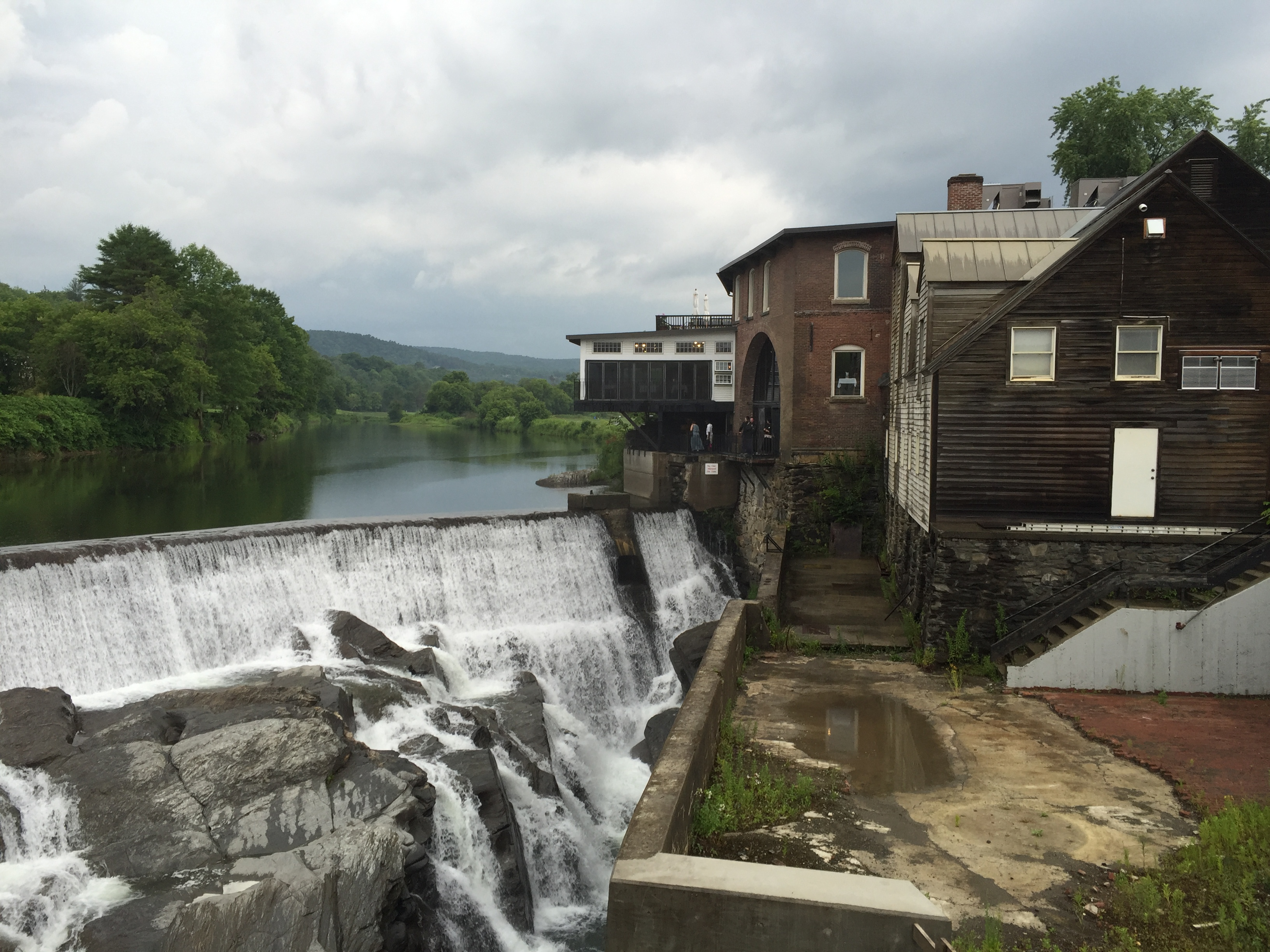
Factory in Quechee, Vermont

Simon Pearce (born 1946 in London) is an Irish-American entrepreneur in glassblowing and pottery, who learned his trade in Italy and Kilkenny, Ireland.

== Business development ==
Pearce located his first US factory, in Quechee, Vermont, in 1981. This site, which is powered hydroelectrically by the Ottauquechee River and is part of the Quechee Historic Mill District, became a showroom, restaurant, and glass-blowing demonstration facility. The New York Times described him as a prominent American designer of glassware and his works have been given as gifts to foreign dignitaries and to presenters at the Academy Awards.

Pearce's company headquarters is in Windsor, Vermont; another manufacturing facility is in Mountain Lake Park, Maryland. His company has several retail outlets in the East of the USA

== Personal life and family ==
As of 2016, Pearce maintained a home in Hartland, Vermont; previously, he resided in Norwich, Vermont. He and his wife, Pia, have four sons. Their youngest son is Kevin Pearce, a snowboarder, who was seriously injured in 2009 while training for the Olympics. Kevin is the subject of the 2013 HBO film The Crash Reel.

Pearce's book, Simon Pearce: Design For Living was published in the fall of 2016.
