= Mountain Queen: The Summits of Lhakpa Sherpa =

- Release poster
- Directed by: Lucy Walker
- Produced by: Charlie Corwin; Michael D. Ratner; Miranda Sherman; Dalia Burde; Christopher Newman
- Cinematography: Devin Whetstone; Matthew Irving
- Edited by: Tyler Temple Higgins; Yaniv Elani; Davon Ramos; David Brodie; Carlos Haynes; Inaya Yusuf
- Music by: Adam Peters
- Production companies: SK Global Entertainment; OBB Pictures; Avocados & Coconuts
- Distributed by: Netflix
- Release dates: September 8, 2023 (TIFF); July 31, 2024 (United States)
- Running time: 111 minutes
- Country: United States
- Languages: English; Nepali

Mountain Queen: The Summits of Lhakpa Sherpa is a 2023 American documentary film directed by Lucy Walker. It follows Lhakpa Sherpa as she climbs and survives ten successful summits of Mount Everest.

It had its world premiere at the Toronto International Film Festival on September 8, 2023, and was released on July 31, 2024, by Netflix.

== Plot ==
Lhakpa Sherpa becomes the first Nepali woman to climb and survive Mount Everest, while bringing up two daughters and surviving an abusive marriage.

== Release ==
The film had its world premiere at the Toronto International Film Festival on September 8, 2023. Shortly after, Netflix acquired distribution rights to the film. It was released on July 31, 2024.

== Awards ==
At TIFF, the film was named second runner-up for the People's Choice Award for Documentaries. Mountain Queen won the Grand Prize at the Kendal Mountain Festival's International Film Competition for 2024. The series also won a 2024 Peabody Award.
