= Sybil Robson Orr =

American film producer (born 1962)

- Born: Sybil Ann Robson; Tulsa, Oklahoma
- Education: Southern Methodist University
- Occupation: Film producer
- Years active: 1993–present
- Spouse: Matthew Orr (2001–present)

Sybil Ann Robson Orr is an American film producer and founder of Robson Orr Entertainment. She in the niece of Walmart founders Sam Walton and Bud Walton.

== Early life and career ==
Robson Orr graduated from Tulsa, Oklahoma's Memorial High School, and holds a BA from Southern Methodist University.

She produced the 2006 documentary Blindsight.

== Filmography ==
- Gordy (1995) – producer
- Seven and a Match (2001) – executive producer
- Blindsight (2006) – executive producer
- First in Flight (2012) – executive producer
- Rules Don't Apply (2016) - producer
