= Devil's Playground (2002 film) =

2002 American documentary film by Lucy Walker

- DVD Cover
- Directed by: Lucy Walker
- Produced by: Steven Cantor
- Starring: Velda Bontrager; Joann Hochstetler; Emma Miller; Faron Yoder; Gerald Yutzy
- Production company: Stick Figure Productions
- Distributed by: Cinemax
- Release date: January 11, 2002 (Sundance Film Festival)
- Running time: 77 minutes
- Language: English

Devil's Playground is a 2002 American documentary film directed by Lucy Walker about the experiences of several Amish youths who decide whether to remain in or leave their community and faith during the period known as rumspringa ("running around" in Pennsylvania Dutch). The film follows a few Amish teenagers in LaGrange County, Indiana who enter the "English" (non-Amish) world and experience partying, drinking, illegal drugs, and pre-marital sex. Some teens in the film profess that they will eventually become baptized as adults in the Amish community. If they are baptized, then leave the church, they will be shunned by family and friends; one girl recounts her experience of this.

== Synopsis ==
According to Devil's Playground, at the age of 16, Amish youth are allowed to depart from many of the Amish rules. The young people sample life outside of the Amish community. Many drive cars, wear modern clothes and cut and style their hair in more fashionable styles, get jobs, have romantic and sexual relationships, and some experiment with drugs.

One Amish youth whom the film follows, Faron—a preacher's son—turns to drug dealing to satisfy his habit. Faron is eventually apprehended by the authorities; he aids them in arresting another dealer. Each of the film's subjects faces a variety of challenges and pressures from both the "English World" and the "Amish World" of their families. Some make the commitment to return to their communities, others do not. One girl is baptized but later leaves the Amish church, resulting in her family shunning her.

According to the documentary, "over 90%" of Amish youth decide to join the church, returning to their communities and families.

== Reception ==
The film won the 2001 Sony/AFI DVCam Fest Documentary Category and overall Grand Prize, the 2001 Sarasota Film Festival Audience Award for Best Documentary, and a Jury's Special Mention in the Documentary Category in the 2002 Karlovy Vary International Film Festival (Czech Republic). The film was nominated by jury for Best Documentary for the 2003 IFP's Independent Spirit Awards. After being aired on Cinemax as part of the series Cinemax Reel Life, it was also nominated for three 2002 News and Documentary Emmy Swards: Best Documentary, Outstanding Individual Achievement in a Craft: Direction, and Outstanding Individual Achievement in a Craft: Editing.

Rotten Tomatoes, a review aggregator, reports that 56% of nine surveyed critics gave the film a positive review; the average rating was 6.4/10. Dennis Harvey of Variety stated, "To filmmaker Lucy Walker's credit, results transcend their sensational first impression, thanks to empathetic focus on a few select kids going through enormous changes", and summed it up as "engrossing." Los Angeles Times critic Kenneth Turan called it "one of the best documentaries in the (Sundance) festival". He wrote that the film deals in a poignant way with rumspringa. "This examination of the life-changing question one teen calls 'to be or not to be Amish' is haunting, provocative and unexpected." Film Threat's Anthony Miele found the film "interesting and informative", but it "alludes to 'document' an entire sub-culture of a particular society, but [...] simply follows one troubled youth, Faron."

== See also ==
- Amish
- Rumspringa
- Rite of passage
