= High Ground (2012 film) =

- Film poster
- Directed by: Michael Brown
- Written by: Brian Mockenhaupt
- Produced by: Don Hahn
- Starring: Erik Weihenmayer, Cody Miranda, Chad Jukes, Steve Baskis
- Music by: Chris Bacon
- Distributed by: Red Flag Releasing
- Release date: August 2012
- Running time: 92 minutes
- Country: United States
- Language: English

High Ground is a 2012 American documentary film, directed by Michael Brown, about eleven veterans who set off to climb the tallest peak in the Himalayas to heal the physical and emotional wounds of war. The expedition is led by blind adventurer Erik Weihenmayer, the first blind man to summit Mount Everest, and a team of experienced mountain climbers who guide this team of wounded veterans up the summit.

After an initial premiere at the Boulder International Film Festival, the film was selected for participation in the Newport Beach Film Festival, Sarasota Film Festival, and the Seattle International Film Festival. The domestic release was in August 2012; the DVD release was for Veteran's Day 2012.

== Forming the expedition ==
In October 2010, ten years after blind adventurer Erik Weihenmayer made his historic ascent of Everest, the same team of mountain guides who assisted Erik reunited to lead a group of veterans on a climb that was all about shattering barriers and misperceptions. With the help of World T.E.A.M. Sports, a veterans support organization, they created an expedition to Nepal for 11 combat veterans suffering from physical and emotional injuries sustained during service in Iraq and Afghanistan. These soldiers, representing four branches of the United States military, set out to climb the 20,075 ft peak of Lobuche East, just 8.7 miles from Mount Everest. The expedition is known as "Soldiers to the Summit".

Michael Brown, who filmed Weihenmayer's summit ten years earlier, joined the group to film the climb.

== The climb ==
After days of trekking in Nepal's Khumbu Valley, the climbing route started from Lobuche High Camp with steep rock and transitioned to snow and ice for the final 2,000 feet. To ensure they summited in the best conditions, the team started climbing shortly after midnight, and on October 14, 2010, they reached the summit of Lobuche. Only a few soldiers were able to reach the summit.

Brown and cinematographers Rex Pemberton and Didrik Johnck, all Everest summiteers, climbed alongside the team. Promising graduates of Brown's Outside Adventure Film School made up the remainder of the film crew. Digital SLRs, including the Canon EOS 7D, were used for their lightweight portability and image quality. Each cameraperson also carried digital field recorders and flip cameras to capture the drama on the climb. Cold and altitude were the two environmental factors that presented the biggest challenges. Filmmakers charged batteries at teahouses along the trek, which was an expensive process that required cash-only payments in Nepalese currency to pay for electricity.

== Music ==
Composer Chris Bacon's scores for films like Source Code inspired Don and Michael to ask him to join the project. "We wanted the music to underline the journey, and asked Chris to start with very conventional American guitars and instrumentation," said Don, "and then as the journey progressed, let the music become more exotic and spiritual to reflect the inward journey of the soldiers." "Sometimes in the process of composing for a film I see the individual scenes so many times that writing the music can become a technical exercise, with the repetition numbing a film's emotional effect on me," shared Chris Bacon. "Upon viewing the finished version of High Ground, however, I was stunned at its emotional impact, and the tremendous pride I felt towards the men and women featured in the film and what they have sacrificed and accomplished."

By Thanksgiving of 2011, New York director and editor Ryan Fenson-Hood came on board to do a fine cut of the film and Oscar-winning sound designer Gary Rizzo (The Incredibles, Inception) mixed the film at the venerable Skywalker Ranch in Marin, California.
