= Blindsight (film) =

- UK DVD Sleeve
- Directed by: Lucy Walker
- Produced by: Sybil Robson Orr
- Starring: Erik Weihenmayer, Sabriye Tenberken, Kyila, Tashi Pasang, Tenzin, Dachung, Gyenshen, Sonam Bhumtso
- Release dates: 11 September 2006 (Toronto International Film Festival); 8 August 2008 (United Kingdom)
- Running time: 104 minutes
- Country: United Kingdom
- Language: English

Blindsight is a 2006 documentary film directed by Lucy Walker and produced by Sybil Robson Orr for Robson Entertainment. It premiered at 2006 Toronto International Film Festival (TIFF) in the category Real to Reel.

== Critical reception ==
The film received near universally positive reviews from critics. The review aggregator website Rotten Tomatoes reported that 98% of critics gave the film a positive review, based on 49 reviews. Metacritic reported the film had an average score of 72 out of 100, based on 12 reviews.
