= The Crash Reel =

- Directed by: Lucy Walker
- Written by: Pedro Kos; Lucy Walker
- Produced by: Julian Cautherley; Lucy Walker
- Starring: Kevin Pearce
- Cinematography: Nick Higgins
- Edited by: Pedro Kos
- Music by: Moby
- Production companies: Impact Partners; Tree Tree Tree
- Distributed by: HBO Documentary Films; Phase 4 Films
- Release dates: January 18, 2013 (Sundance Film Festival); July 15, 2013 (U.S.)
- Running time: 108 minutes
- Country: United States
- Language: English

The Crash Reel is a documentary film directed by Lucy Walker which premiered as the Opening Night Gala film on 19 January 2013 at the Sundance Film Festival.

Through 20 years of sports and verite footage, The Crash Reel chronicles the rivalry between Kevin Pearce and Shaun White which culminates in Kevin's life-changing crash and later comeback. The film also showcases the Pearce family, including Kevin's father glass-blower Simon Pearce and Kevin's brother David C. Pearce who describes his struggle to accept his Down syndrome.

The film also premiered at the X Games on January 23, 2013 in Aspen as the first ever movie to play as a featured part of the event. The movie received critical acclaim from critics and audiences.

== Reception ==
On the review aggregator website Rotten Tomatoes, 96% of 46 critics' reviews are positive, with an average rating of 7.9/10. The website's consensus reads: "Smart, compassionate, and moving, The Crash Reel uses the familiar sport-doc formula to subvert expectations and ask challenging questions about ambition and achievement." Metacritic, which uses a weighted average, assigned the film a score of 79 out of 100, based on 15 critics, indicating "generally favorable" reviews.

== Soundtrack ==
Transcribed from the ending credits.

| Performed by | Track title |
|---|---|
| Groove Armada | "Paper Romance" |
| Lykke Li | "I Know Places" |
| Stars of the Lid | "Central Texas", "A Meaningful Moment Through a Meaningless Process" |
| Canned Heat | "Going Up the Country" |
| DJ Shadow | "Giving up the Ghost" |
| Underworld | "Mmm Skyscraper... I Love You" |
| Cliff Martinez | "Where's The Deluxe Version?", "They Broke His Pelvis", "My Name on a Car" |
| The Chemical Brothers | "K+D+B" |
| Sigur Rós | "Ekki múkk" |
| The Hives | "Come On!" |
| Bon Iver | "Holocene" |
| José González | "Down the Line", "Crosses/Crosses" |
| Spiritualized | "Ladies and Gentlemen We Are Floating in Space" |
| Ben Howard | "Black Flies" |
| Moby | "JLTF" |
| Aarktica | "You Have Cured a Million Ghosts" |
| Tycho | "A Walk" |
| Grizzly Bear | "Sun in Your Eyes" |
| M83 | "Wait", "My Tears Are Becoming a Sea" |
| Ryan Adams | "I See Monsters" |
| Asaf Avidan | "One Day Reckoning Song" |
| Crystal Castles | Child I Will Hurt You |
