= Landfill gas emission reduction in Brazil =

Brazil has established a strong public policy using Clean Development Mechanism Projects to reduce methane emissions from landfills. An important component of these projects is the sale of avoided emissions by the private market to generate revenue.

== Introduction ==
Faced with serious pollution challenges, Brazil established public policy that would create incentives for the foreign and national private market to invest financial, technological, and human resources in the country. The premise is that experienced companies would bring their technology to Brazil, in an effort to reduce methane gas emissions. The specific technology and projects discussed in this article refer to landfill gas projects. Although this technology was new to Brazil in the early 2000s when companies first began implementing them, these methods were not new to Europe or North America. Additionally, Brazil is just one of many countries participating in similar projects around the world.

== Background ==
Brazil signed the Kyoto Protocol on April 29, 1998, and ratified it on August 23, 2002. To date, Brazil has 347 clean development mechanism (CDM) projects, which account for 7.3% of the total projects worldwide. Estimated projections by the United Nations Environment Programme (UNEP) show that by 2012, Brazil will have 102 million certified emission reductions (CER), a $1,225 million value. Unlike its fellow BRIC countries, in Brazil the largest component of potential CER projects is landfill gas projects, with a 31.3% share. According to the national survey on basic sanitation (PNSB) conducted in 2008, all of the 5,564 municipalities have access to basic sanitation. According to the Environmental Sanitation Technology Company (CETESB) study, the 6,000 waste sites in Brazil receive 60,000 tonnes of waste per day. Seventy-six percent (76%) of this waste goes to dumps with no management, gas collection, or water treatment. This same study showed that 83.18% of Brazil's methane gas emissions come from uncontrolled waste sites.

== Landfill gas projects ==
Private companies have submitted CDM projects to the United Nations Framework Convention on Climate Change (UNFCCC) to use landfill gas (LFG) discharges from waste management sites to earn carbon credits or CER. There are over 100 LFG CDM projects in Brazil. The diagram below illustrates the process.

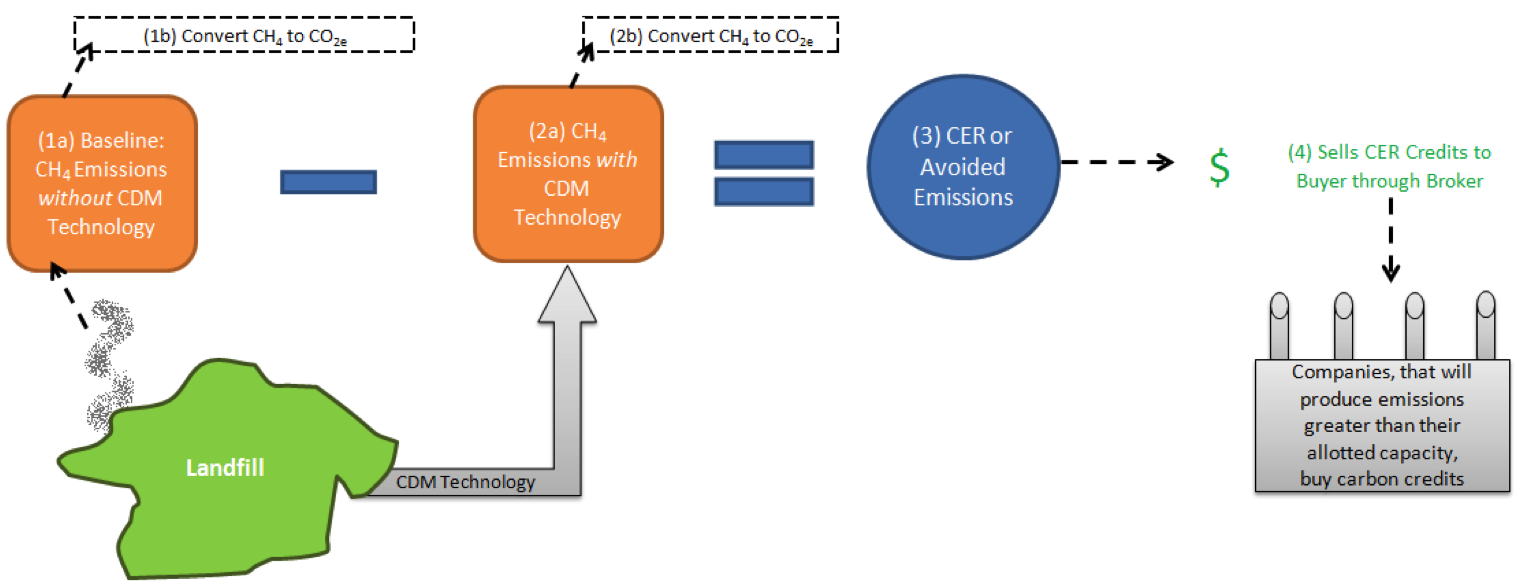

First, once the waste management company has developed the landfill with the new technology, (1a) it calculates how much methane (CH_{4}) would have been emitted into the air without its intervention. (1b) Then it converts the CH_{4} into carbon equivalents (C0_{2e}). (2a) Next, the company projects how much methane it expects to emit into the air, with the new technology. Again, (2b) it converts the CH_{4} into C0_{2e}. (3) Next, the company determines the avoided emissions or CER but subtracting the emission projections with the technology from the baseline emissions without the technology. (4) Once credited, the company sells the CER through a broker to companies that will produce emissions greater than their allotted capacity.

=== SASA ===
The SASA landfill is located in Tremembé in São Paulo State of Brazil. Onyx SASA is a subsidiary of Veolia Environnement and is an officially registered project with UNFCCC, as of November 24, 2005. SenterNovem, an agency of the Dutch Ministry of Economic Affairs in the Netherlands, is a partner in the project. The following flow chart depicts the process used by the landfill:

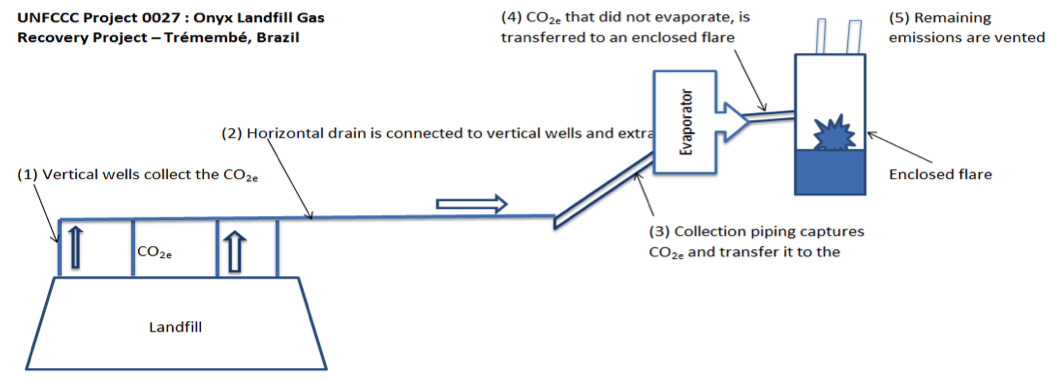

(1) Methane (CH_{4}) or carbon equivalents (CO_{2e}) are captured by the vertical wells. (2) Next, a horizontal drain that is connected to the vertical wells extracts the CO_{2e}. (3) Then, a high density collection pipe captures the CO_{2e} and transfers it to the evaporator. (4) Any CO_{2e} that did not evaporate, is transferred to an enclosed flare. (5) The remaining emissions are then vented into the air.

At the filing of the report, Onyx SASA anticipated the landfill would accrue 700,625 tons CO_{2e} from 2003 through 2012 in CER. As of 2011, Onyx SASA has filed monitoring reports for the periods of 2003 through 2007. The following chart outlines the actual CER realized to date:

Year	Baseline CO_{2e} Emissions	CO_{2e} Emissions with CDM Technology	Projected CER	Actual CER
2003	57,093	20,433	36,661	21,954
2004	71,350	26,083	45,267	30,656
2005	85,147	37,383	47,764	40,988
2006	98,024	36,617	58,407	46,030
2007	109,719	38,566	71,153	42,320
2008	120,362	49,932	70,430	TBD
2009	129,889	39,551	90,338	TBD
2010	138,233	48,158	90,075	TBD
2011	145,394	57,947	87,447	TBD
2012	149,730	46,647	103,083	TBD
Total	1,104,943	404,318	700,625	181,948 (2003–2007)

Additionally, the project design report states Onyx SASA expects to revegetate and reforest the land; upon fulfillment, 150,000 trees will be planted around the landfill.

=== Paulínia ===
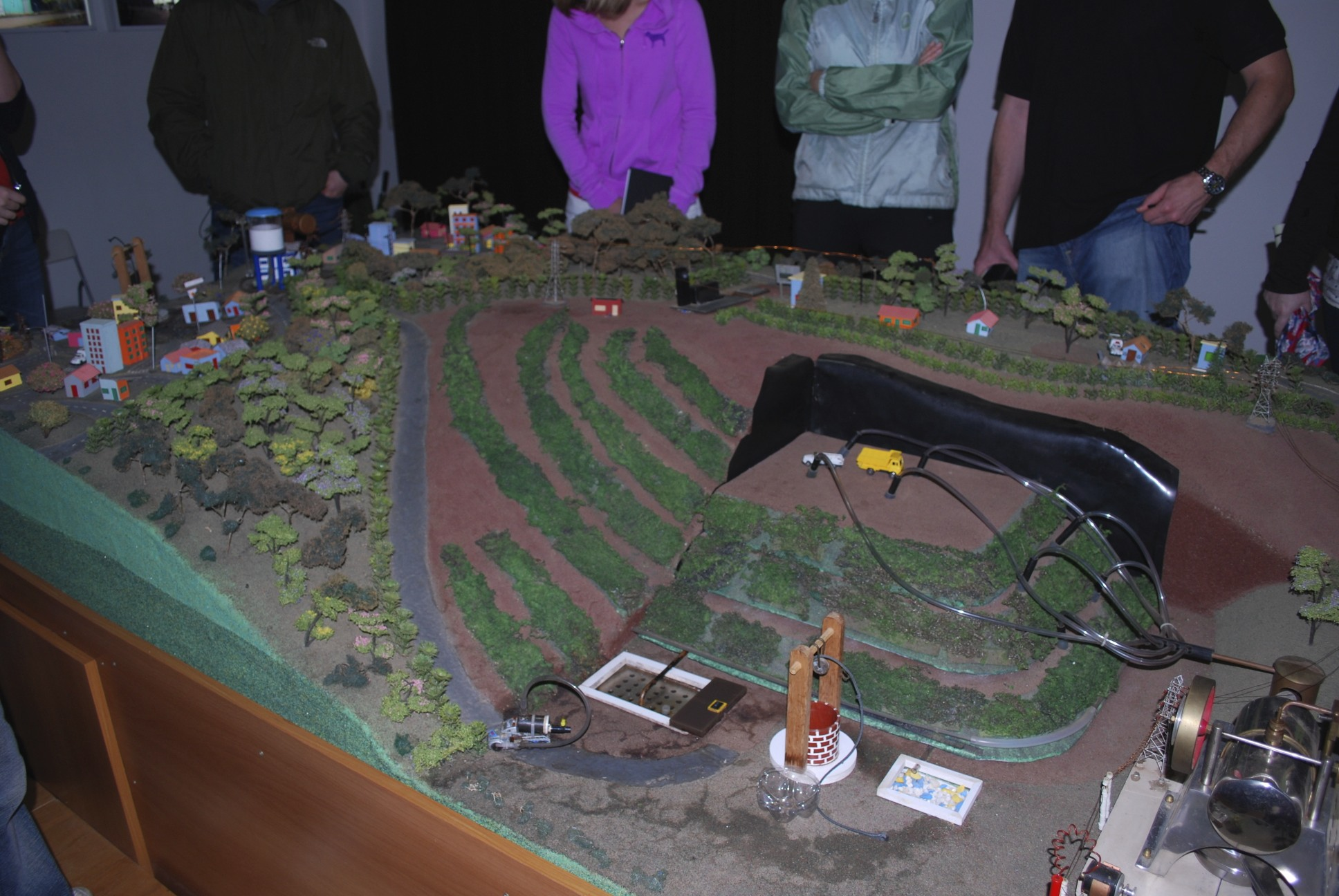
Diorama of ESTRE's Paulínia Landfill, a Clean Development Mechanism Project.

Empresa de Saneamento e Tratamento de Resíduos (ESTRE) is a private waste management Brazilian-based company, founded in 1999. ESTRE operates seven sites in Brazil, Uruguay, and Argentina. It offers waste management services, including recycling and landfills, to private companies and the government. The Paulínia Landfill Gas Project (EPLGP) is located in Campinas in São Paulo State of Brazil. The project was registered on March 3, 2006, with UNFCCC.

The goal of the EPLGP is to reduce greenhouse emissions. The following schematic illustrates the process of capturing and recycling the gas emissions:

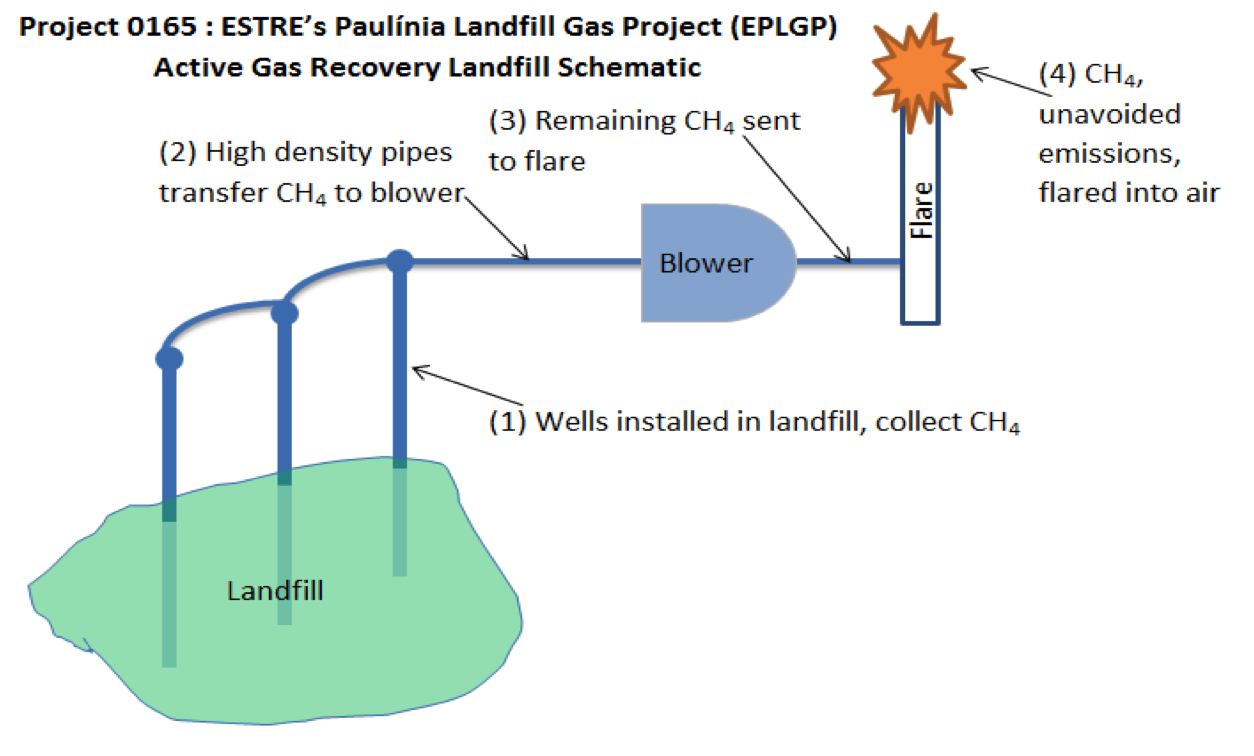

As illustrated above, (1) wells installed in the landfill collect the methane (CH_{4}). (2) Next, high density pipes connected to the wells transfer the CH_{4} to the blower. (3) Any remaining CH_{4} is then sent to the flare. (4) Last, the CH_{4} is flared into the air.

The following table outlines the forecasted and actual yearly outputs of CER according to the monitoring reports filed with UNFCCC:

Timeframe	Projected CER	Actual CER
9/14/2006 - 1/31/2007	67,179	56,376
2/1/2007 - 7/31/2007	96,268	81,862
8/1/2007 - 2/29/2008	116,745	112,938
3/1/2008 - 8/31/2008	91,873	104,918
2/1/2009 - 6/30/2009	96,549	112,950
7/1/2009 - 2/25/2010	157,089	177,545
2/26/2010 - 7/31/2010	70,832	187,909^
8/1/2010 - 10/31/2010	63,505	118,860^
11/1/2010 - 1/31/2011	61,077	119,056^
2/1/2011 - 12/31/2011	204,397	TBD
2012	198,019	TBD
Total	1,487,908	1,188,640 (9/14/2006 - 1/31/2011)

^The notable increase in actual CER versus the projected CER is due to the increase in waste received by the landfill, from 2.5 tons per day as reported in the CDM application to 5 tons per day.

== Legislation: National Policy on Climate Change ==
After Brazil's Congress passed the climate change legislation, on December 29, 2009, President Luiz Inácio Lula da Silva signed the National Policy on Climate Change (PNMC). The law requires Brazil to reduce greenhouse gas emissions by 38.9% by 2020. On December 9, 2010, President Lula signed a decree which details the provisions of PNMC. At its foundation, PNMC focuses on prevention, citizen participation, and sustainable development.

=== Law N° 12.187 of 2009 ===
There are 13 articles in the legislation:

Article 1 establishes the laws and principals governing PNMC.

Article 2 establishes definitions and key terms related to climate change including, adverse effects of climate change, emissions, greenhouse gases, and mitigation.

Article 3 states:
1. Everyone has a duty to reduce the human impact on climate change
2. Steps will be taken to anticipate, prevent, and minimize the causes of climate change as determined by the scientific community
3. Measures will be taken to consider and distribute the burden among various socio-economic populations and communities
4. Sustainable development is a prerequisite for mitigating climate change and the needs of each population and territory should be dually considered
5. Actions taken at the national level to mitigate climate change must consider actions taken at the municipal, state, and private sectors
6. Vetoed

Article 4 outlines the goals:
1. Reconcile socio-economic development and climate protection
2. Reduce greenhouse emissions
3. Vetoed
4. Strengthen methods for removal of anthropogenic green house emissions
5. Use measures to promote adaption by all three spheres of the Brazilian Federation with participation and collaboration from economic and social sectors, in particular those most affected by climate change
6. Preserve, conserve, and restore environmental resources, in particular natural biomes considered a National Heritage
7. Consolidate and expand legally protected areas and encourage reforestation and revegetation of degraded areas
8. Stimulate development of the Brazilian Market for Emissions Reduction (MBRE)

Article 5 establishes the guidelines of PNMC:
1. Follow-through on commitments made through the Kyoto Protocol and other climate change measures
2. Assess measurable benefits, quantifiable and verifiable, of mitigation actions
3. Adapt measures to reduce adverse effects
4. Integrate strategies at the local, regional, and national levels
5. Encourage participation of the federal, state, county, and municipal levels, as well as the productive sector, academia and civil society organizations, and implement policies, plans, programs, and actions
6. Promote and develop scientific research
7. Utilize financial and economic instruments to promote mitigation actions
8. Identify and articulate the instruments used to protect climate change
9. Promote activities that effectively reduce gas emissions
10. Promote international cooperation
11. Improve systematic observation
12. Promote dissemination of information, education, and training
13. Stimulate and support practices and activities with low emissions and sustainable consumption

Article 6 outlines the instruments, committees, plans, funding, policy, research, monitoring, indicators, and assessments PNMC will utilize toward climate change.

Article 7 outlines institutional instruments PNMC will utilize:
1. Interministerial Committee on Climate Change
2. Interministerial Commission on Global Climate Change
3. Brazilian Forum on Climate Change
4. The Brazilian Network for Research on Global Climate Change - Climate Network
5. Commission for Coordination of Activities of Meteorology, Climatology and Hydrology

Article 8 addresses the official financial institutions line of credit to support climate change efforts.

Article 9 notes that MBRE will be monitored by the Securities Commission.

Article 10 was vetoed.

Article 11 states that public policy and government programs should be compatible with PNMC.

Article 12 states the country's adoption of greenhouse emission gas reductions of 36.1% to 38.9%.

Article 13 states that the law will become official on its publication date of December 31, 2009.

=== Presidential decree N° 7.390 of 2010 ===
The decree specifies how Brazil quantifies greenhouse emissions, how it will achieve the reduction, and a legal requirement for estimating annual emissions. The policy will use Brazil's 2005 emission rate as the business as usual base line for comparison of future emissions. The Policy:

- Provides authority for adopting mitigation actions to achieve the reduction goal
- Requires reduction efforts to be compatible with sustainable development and economic and social interests
- Designates instruments for implementation, include the National Climate Change Plan and the National Climate Change Fund
- Establishes sectoral plans for mitigation and adaptation in forests, agriculture, energy, and transportation
- Creates the Brazilian Market for Emissions Reductions (MBRE) for trading in avoided emissions certificates

Specifically, the decree lists the following Action Plans:

1. Prevention and Control of Deforestation in the Amazon
2. Prevention and Control of Deforestation and Forest Fires in the Cerrado
3. Ten Year Plan for Expansion of Energy
4. Consolidation of an Economy of Low-Carbon in Agriculture
5. Reducing Emissions from Steel

Per the decree, the Sectoral Plans will include:

1. Emission reduction target in 2020 and incremental goals with a maximum interval of three years
2. Actions to be implemented
3. Definition of indicators for monitoring and evaluating effectiveness
4. Proposed regulatory instruments and incentives for implementation
5. Competitive alignment with industry studies' estimated costs and impacts

Per the decree, the following sectors are included in the estimations:

1. Change of Land Use: 1,404 million tons of CO_{2e} (e=equivalent)
2. Energy: 868 million tons of CO_{2e}
3. Agriculture: 730 million tons of CO_{2e}
4. Industrial Processes and Waste: 234 million tons of CO_{2e}

The National Climate Change Fund "supports mitigation and adaptation projects and will rely principally on a to-be-determined portion of future oil and gas revenues."

== See also ==
- Environment of Brazil
