= Sabriye Tenberken =

German tibetologist

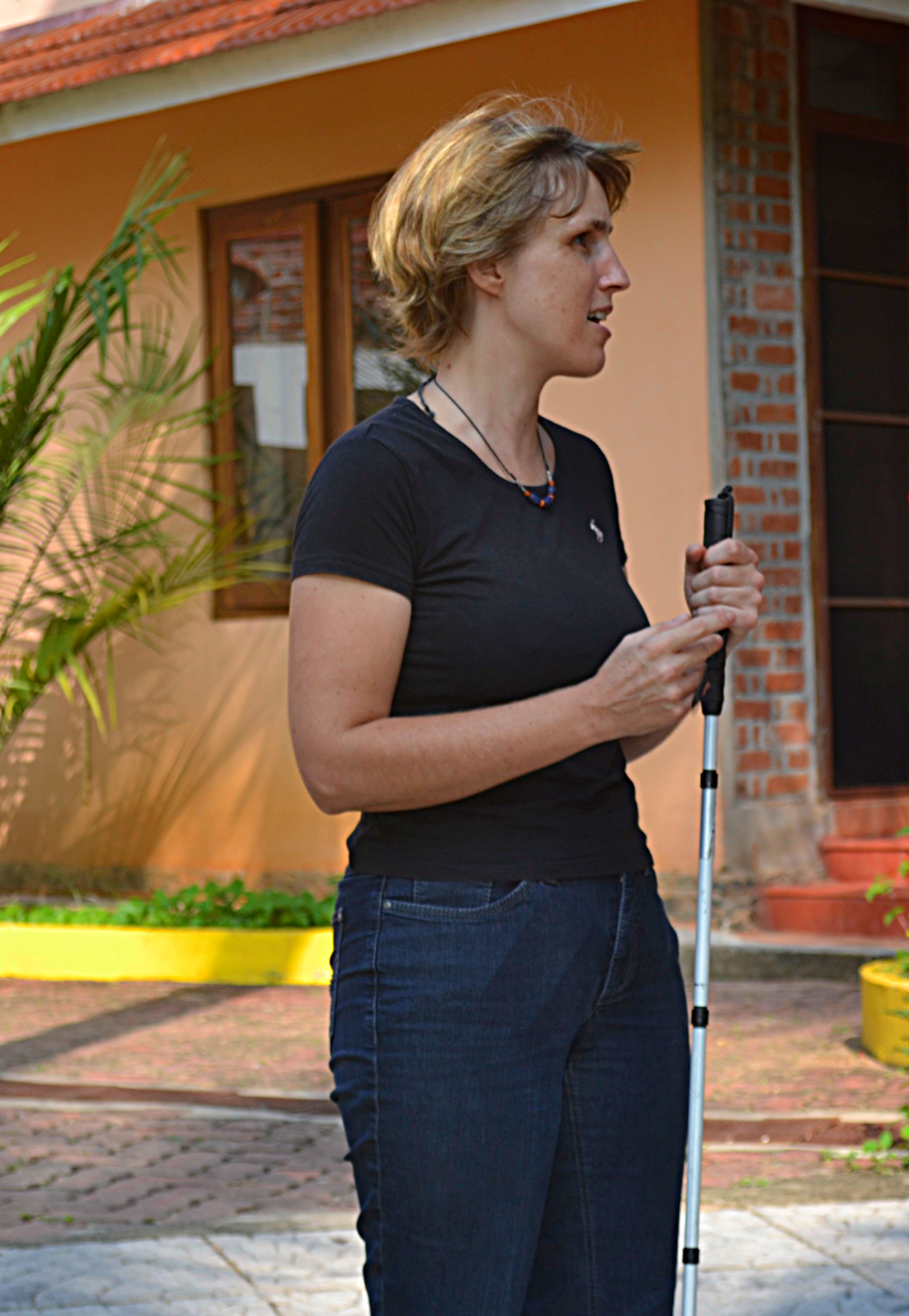
- Sabriye Tenberken at kanthari international
- Born: 1970 (age 55–56); Cologne, West Germany

Sabriye Tenberken (born 1970) is a German tibetologist and co-founder of the organisation Braille Without Borders.

== Biography ==
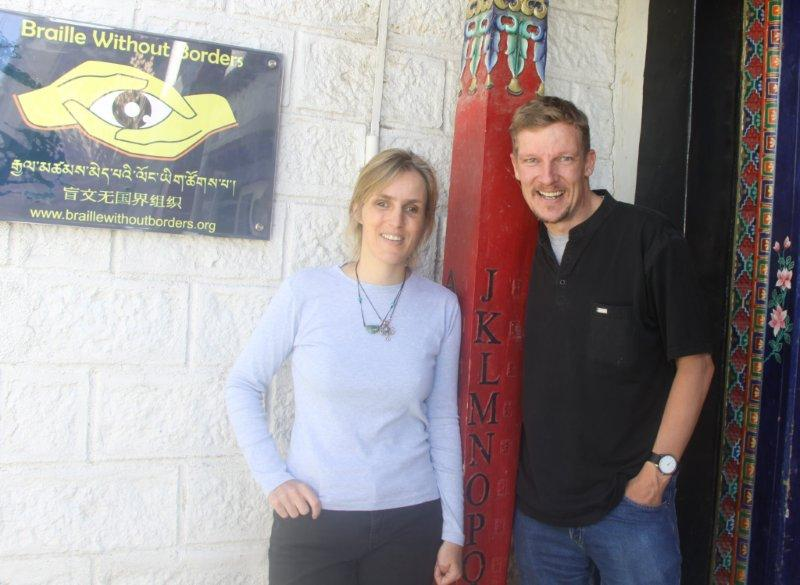
Sabriye Tenberken & Paul Kronenberg

Sabriye was born in Cologne, West Germany. She lost her sight slowly as a child due to retinitis pigmentosa, and her parents took her to many places so she would store up many visual memories, before becoming totally blind by the age of 12. She studied Central Asian Studies at Bonn University. In addition to Mongolian and modern Chinese, she studied modern and classical Tibetan in combination with Sociology and Philosophy.

=== Braille for the Tibetan language ===
As no blind student had ever before ventured to enroll in these kinds of studies, Sabriye could not fall back on the experience of previous students, so she developed her own methods of studying her course of study. By 1992 Sabriye had developed Tibetan Braille, which later became the official reading and writing system for the blind in Tibet. Tibetan Braille is based on German Braille, modified to accommodate the Tibetan script. For example, Tibetan ka, kha, ga, nga are written with the standard Braille letters for k, c, g and lowered g. It was submitted for examination to a Tibetan scholar, who found it to be readily understandable, simple, and easy to learn.

=== A school for the blind ===
In 1997, Sabriye travelled to Tibet alone in order to assess the situation of the blind there. Returning in 1998, she founded the Centre for the Blind in Lhasa, the capital of Tibet, to educate blind people, together with Paul Kronenberg whom she had met there the year before. Before that, most blind children were hidden away from the world by their family members who were reluctant to send them to school. The school started with five children, with Sabriye initially teaching the children herself, as well as serving as coordinator and advisor. She then began training native Tibetans as teachers, selecting and supervising all staff-members of the centre.

The project's progress was not without difficulties and setbacks. Sabriye was able eventually to turn over the running of the centre to one of her former students who trained as a teacher.

In 2017, her visa was no longer extended, and the school was threatened with closure.

=== Braille Without Borders (BWB) ===
In 1998 Paul joined Sabriye in establishing the Project for the Blind, Tibet. In September, 2002, the name was changed to Braille Without Borders, BWB. In addition to the school in Lhasa BWB runs a vocational training centre for blind adults with a farm and cheese factory near Shigatse.

=== kanthari international ===
In 2009, Sabriye Tenberken and her partner Paul Kronenberg also began kanthari international (name intentionally spelled with all letters in lower case) in a village near Thiruvananthapuram, India, They also established an International School for Development and Project Planning near Trivandrum, Kerala, India. The school focuses on discovering and developing the hidden talents of persons from all over the world who often are socially neglected, especially because of disabilities, and empowering them to be innovators and leaders.

== Honours and awards ==
- 2000-03-08 elected Woman of the Year by members of the International Women's Club, Frankfurt, Germany (Elisabeth Norgall Award)
- 2000-08 received the Zilveren Jandaia (together with Paul Kronenberg), a Dutch award for people who improve conditions in developing countries
- 2000-12-08 received the Charity Bambi award of German Media for the documentary film Mit anderen Augen (English: With Other Eyes)
- 2002-09-01, received the Albert Schweitzer Award of the Johann Wolfgang von Goethe Foundation in Basel, Switzerland, together with Paul Kronenberg, presented by the 80-year-old daughter of Albert Schweitzer
- 2002-09 received Nuremberg Teddy for Humanity together with Paul Kronenberg
- 2003-10-07 was knighted alongside Paul Kronenberg in the Order of Oranje-Nassau in the name of the Queen of The Netherlands
- 2004-02-26 received a Christopher award for her book My Path Leads to Tibet
- 2004-10-26 received the Time magazine European HERO 2004 award
- 2004-11-10 received the Time magazine Asia's HERO 2004 award
- 2005 nominated for Nobel Peace Prize
- 2005-01-29 chosen Global Leader for Tomorrow by the World Economy Forum
- 2005-03-02 Leila Hadley Luce Award for Courage of the World Wings Quest Trust Women of Discovery Awards
- 2005-10-05 awarded the Bundesverdienstkreuz, highest German order from the German president Dr. Horst Köhler
- 2005-12 awarded the National Fundraising Award in Berlin, Germany, together with Paul Kronenberg, for fundraising methods emphasizing the strengths and motivation of blind people rather than appealing to donors' pity
- 2006-10 Sabriye and Braille Without Borders were honored as Laureates of the Mother Teresa Award
- 2006-10 National Friendship Award of the People's Republic of China
- 2008-10 the National Braille Press in Boston handed Sabriye the "Hands On Award" for her book My Path Leads to Tibet.
- 2008-10 Sabriye was awarded with the "Goldene Bild der Frau" Award in Germany. The award was given by Germany's largest women's magazine Bild der Frau.
- 2008-12 out of the hands of Geraldine Chaplin, Sabriye Tenberken received the Life Award in Austria.
- 2008-12 Sabriye Tenberken was chosen as one of 15 most influential overseas experts over the past 30 years in China.
- 2009-04 Sabriye Tenberken received the "Marburger Leuchtfeuer" from the Humanistische Union(HU) and the city of Marburg
- 2009-11 Tianjin TV, China Right here recognized Sabriye Tenberken with the "You bring Charm to China Award"
- 2010-02 Sabriye Tenberken was chosen as one of "Those who Moved China in 2009" ("感动中国 2009 年年度人物评选", Gandong Zhongguo) by CCTV.
- 2011-01 The Chinese Connection chose Sabriye Tenberken as one of the - "Top Ten International Friends of China"
- 2011-05 Sabriye Tenberken received the "INCITE Excellence Social Entrepreneurship award 2011". Dr Abdul Kalam (1931–2015), former President of India, was one of the board members of INCITE)
- 2012-03 Sabriye Tenberken and her partner Paul Kronenberg received the "Bornheimer" Award from The Europa School in Bornheim (Germany)

== Appearances in films/talk shows ==
- 2000 Documentary film titled Mit anderen Augen (German for "With Other Eyes") about the Braille Without Borders project. (This won Sabriye the 2000 Charity Bambi Award.)
- 2005-08-15 talk show for CCTV 9 in Beijing, China
- 2005-10-17 guest on The Oprah Winfrey Show titled 8 Women Oprah Wants You to Know, segment Phenomenal Females: Sabriye Tenberken's Journey
- 2006 release of the documentary film Blindsight about the climbing project with Erik Weihenmayer and teens from the School for the Blind/Lhasa in the Himalaya

== Bibliography ==
- Sabriye Tenberken (2000) My Path Leads to Tibet, Arcade Publishing. ISBN 1-55970-658-9
- Sabriye Tenberken and Olaf Schubert (2000) Tashis neue Welt, Dressler. ISBN 3-7915-1998-0
- Sabriye Tenberken (available in late 2006 or early 2007) The Seventh Year - From Tibet to India
