= Quechee Historic Mill District =

Historic district in Vermont, United States

- U.S. National Register of Historic Places
- U.S. Historic district
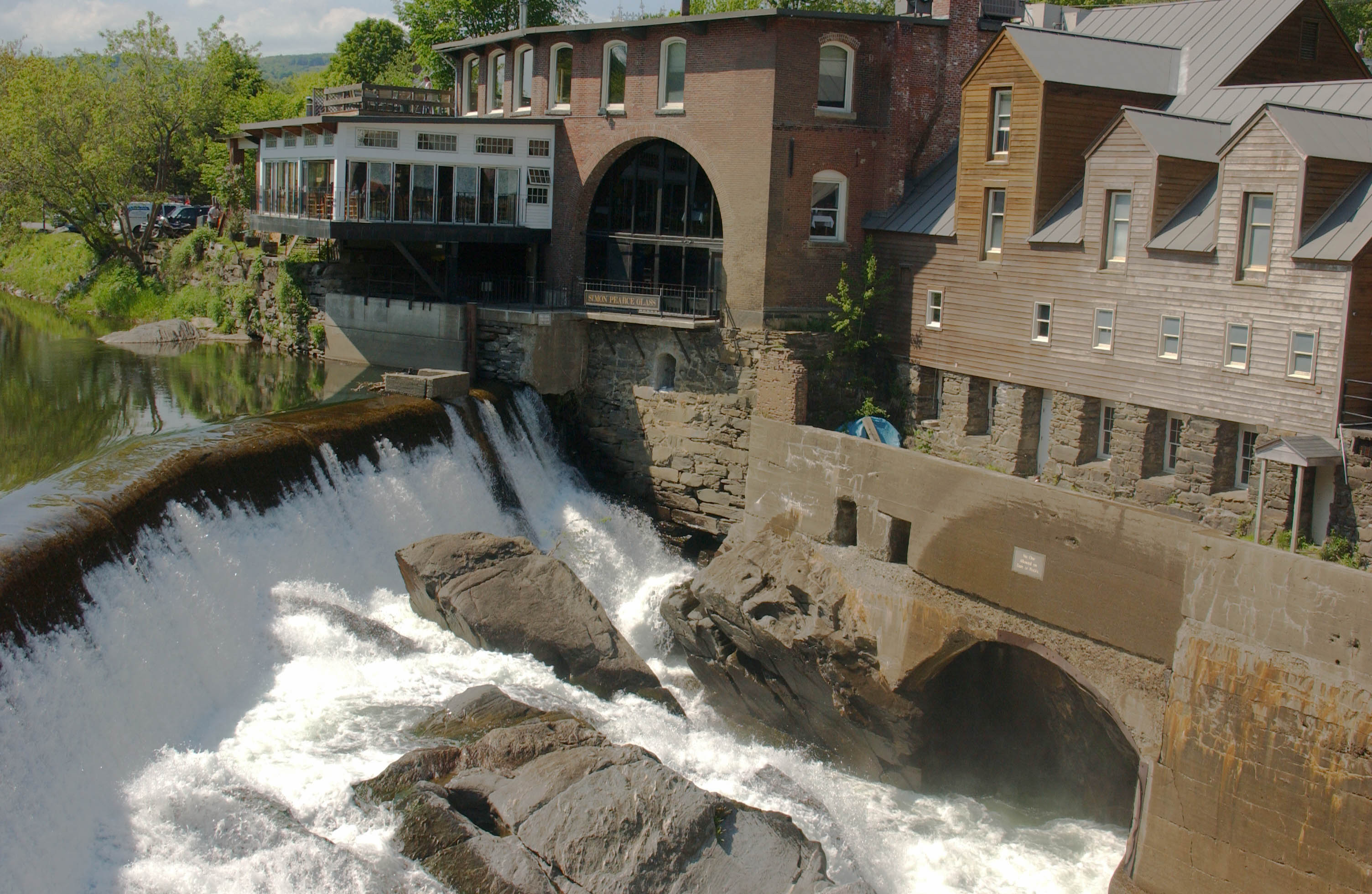

- Location within Vermont Location within the United States
- Location: Roughly along High, Quechee Main, River, and School Sts., and River, Waterman Hill, Deweys Mill, and Cemetery Rds., Hartford, Vermont
- Coordinates: 43°38′50″N 72°25′7″W
- Area: 80 acres (32 ha)
- Architect: Silloway, T.W.; Price, B.D.
- Architectural style: Georgian, Federal, Greek Revival
- NRHP reference No.: 97000747
- Added to NRHP: July 3, 1997

The Quechee Historic Mill District encompasses the historic heart of the village of Quechee, Vermont, a well-preserved 19th-century mill village. Extending along Quechee Main Street between the Old Quechee Road and the Quechee-West Hartford Road, the village was settled in the 1760s, and has an industrial history extending into the 20th century. It was listed on the National Register of Historic Places in 1997.

== Description and history ==
The village of Quechee is located in the central-western portion of Hartford, Vermont, and is set mainly on the northern bank of the Ottauquechee River, where a falls near the village center provided the impetus for industrial development. A covered bridge spans the river just below the area of the falls, where a dam creates a modest impoundment to the west. At the northern end of the dam stand the surviving elements of the 19th-century mills, now adapted for other uses. Next to it is the 1857 Parker House, a fine Second Empire home built by a mill owner. The village includes two cemeteries, several church buildings (some converted to other uses, and a former library, built in 1909.

The Quechee area was first settled in the 1760s, and the power of the Ottauquechee River for industrial use was immediately realized: in 1765, the town set aside land near the falls, and by the 1770s a sawmill and gristmill had been established. By the mid-19th century, textile development was underway, producing woolen flannel fabric. The existing mill burned in 1869, and was rebuilt and expanded over the following decades. The mill closed in 1951, and has since been readapted for use as a glass blowing studio. The village itself was transformed by an active redevelopment initiative into a center of recreation and tourism.

== See also ==
- National Register of Historic Places listings in Windsor County, Vermont
