= Ram Dass, Going Home =

2017 short documentary film

- Poster
- Production company: Further Pictures
- Distributed by: Netflix
- Release date: 2017

Ram Dass, Going Home is a 2017 short documentary portrait of Ram Dass. It was shortlisted by the Academy of Motion Picture Arts and Sciences as a contender for the 2018 Academy Award for Documentary Short Subject.
