= Erik Weihenmayer =

Blind American climber (born 1968)

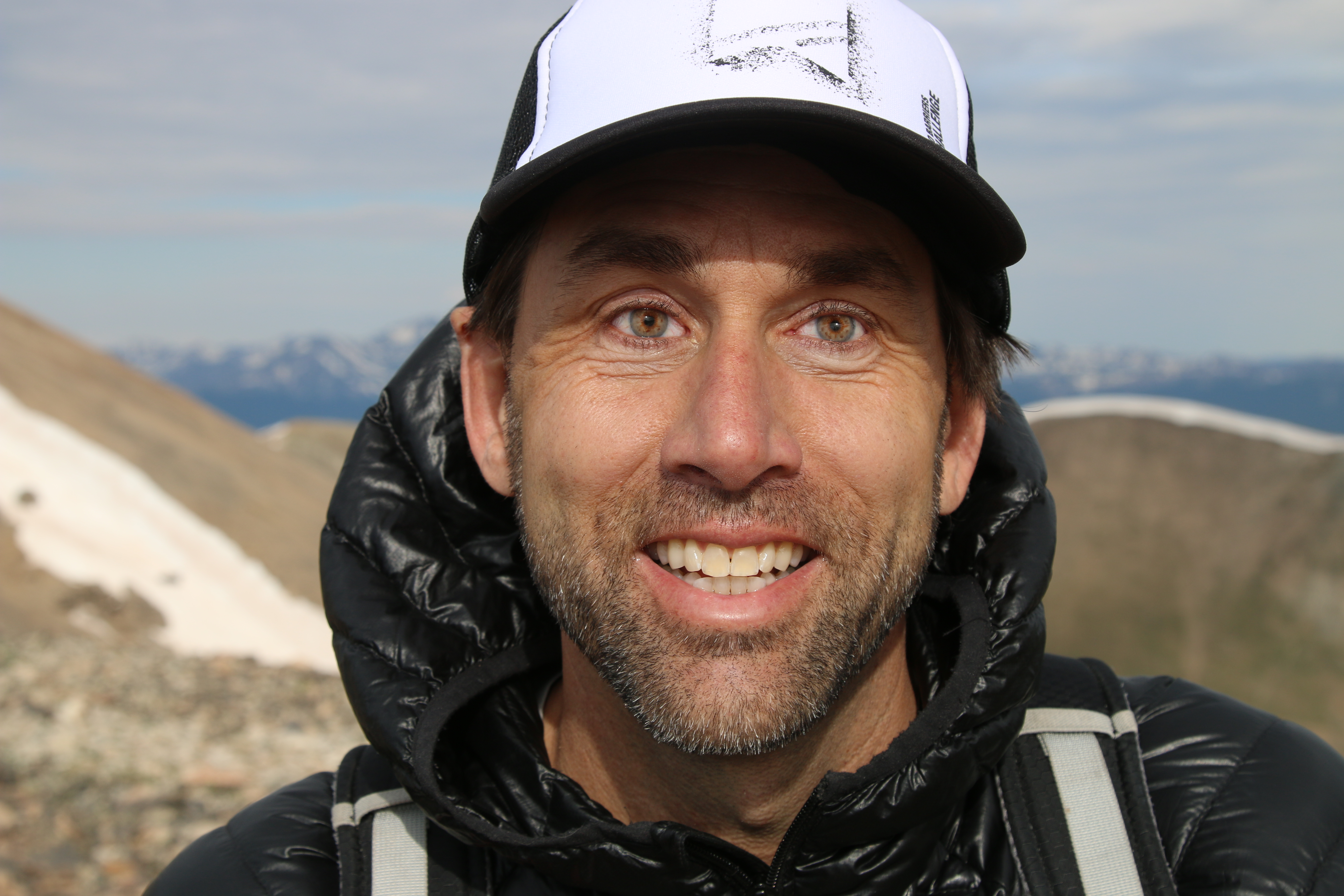
- Weihenmayer on Mount Sherman, Colorado, a 14,000 ft. peak
- Born: September 23, 1968 (age 57); Princeton, New Jersey, U.S.
- Education: Weston High School
- Occupations: Adventurer, motivational speaker, author
- Known for: High Ground
- Website: erikweihenmayer.com

Erik Weihenmayer (born September 23, 1968) is an American athlete, adventurer, author, activist and motivational speaker. He was the first blind person to reach the summit of Mount Everest, on May 25, 2001. Due to this accomplishment he was featured on the cover of Time magazine. He completed the Seven Summits in September 2002, one of only 150 mountaineers at the time to do so, but the only blind climber to achieve this feat. In 2008, he also added the Carstensz Pyramid thus completing the Eight Summits. Weihenmayer has also made noteworthy climbs up the Nose of El Capitan in Yosemite in 1996, and ascended Losar, a 2,700-foot (820 m) vertical ice face in the Himalayas in 2008.

In 2005, he co-founded No Barriers, a nonprofit organization that helps people of diverse backgrounds and abilities with their daily lives. In September 2014, Weihenmayer and blinded Navy veteran Lonnie Bedwell kayaked the entire 277 miles (446 km) of the Grand Canyon, considered one of the most formidable whitewater locations. He is a prominent worldwide speaker, focusing on the topic of living a "No Barriers Life."

== Early life and education ==
Weihenmayer was born September 23, 1968, in Princeton, New Jersey. At 15 months old, he was diagnosed with juvenile retinoschisis, which led doctors to believe he would be fully blind by 13. At age 4, Weihenmayer and his family moved to Coral Gables, Florida, and, in 1975, to Hong Kong, where Weihenmayer attended the Hong Kong International School for grades 2–6. As he was going blind, Weihenmayer fought against using canes and learning Braille. He wanted to hang on to his life in the sighted world. Upon returning to America, Weihenmayer and his family settled in Connecticut, where he attended Weston High School. He eventually turned to wrestling and became a prominent force in high school, captaining his team and representing Connecticut in the National Junior Freestyle Wrestling Championship in Iowa.

At age 16, he started using a guide dog. He tried rock climbing, and found he was a natural at scrambling up a face using his hands and feet to find holds. Then he attended Boston College and graduated with a double major in English and communications. He did his student-teaching at Buckingham Browne & Nichols School in Massachusetts, became a middle-school teacher at Phoenix Country Day School, where he met his fellow teacher and future wife, Ellie Reeves. He also coached wrestling in Phoenix.

Weihenmayer has been granted honorary degrees from Lehigh University, Lafayette College, Babson College, Colorado Mountain College, the University of Vermont, Lesley University, and the University of Arizona.

== Adventure career ==
=== Seven Summits ===
Weihenmayer's first big mountain was Denali, in 1995, and in 2004, with Jeff Evans, Sabriye Tenberken and six blind Tibetan teenagers, he climbed on the north side of Everest to 21,500 feet (6,55km), higher than any group of blind people have ever stood. A documentary based on the project, Blindsight, was released in 2006.

On May 25, 2001, Weihenmayer became the first blind person to reach the summit of Mount Everest. For this feat, he was honored with a Time Magazine cover story. Of his Everest ascent, Time stated, "There is no way to put what Erik has done in perspective because no one has ever done anything like it. It is a unique achievement, one that in the truest sense pushes the limits of what man is capable of."

He completed the Seven Summits in September 2002, joining 150 mountaineers at the time who had accomplished that feat, but as the only blind climber. In 2008, he also added Carstensz Pyramid in Indonesia, the tallest peak in Australasia, thus completing the more respected Eight Summits.

=== Climbing ===
Weihenmayer has climbed rock and ice faces around the world. These include the first blind ascent of the 3,000-foot Nose of El Capitan in Yosemite, a difficult alpine climb of spectacular Alpamayo in Peru, and an ascent of a rarely-climbed 700-meter frozen waterfall in Nepal.

=== Kayaking ===
In September 2014, Weihenmayer and blinded Navy veteran, Lonnie Bedwell, kayaked the entire 277-miles of the Grand Canyon.

=== Other adventures ===
In 2006, Weihenmayer created the Adventure Team Challenge, a first-of-its-kind adventure race in which teams of disabled and non-disabled athletes compete; his team won five years in a row. In 2010, he completed the Leadville 100 mountain bike race, with elevations all above 10,000 feet, on a tandem, once again becoming the first blind person to complete a world-class competition. And in 2011, Weihenmayer's Team No Limits raced across the deserts and mountains of Morocco for a month, finishing in second place on the ABC reality show Expedition Impossible.

He has also completed the Primal Quest, an adventure race over 460 miles with 60,000 feet of elevation gain.

== Books ==
In addition to being an adventurer and speaker, Weihenmayer is also the author of the book, Touch the Top of the World: A Blind Man's Journey to Climb Farther Than the Eye Can See, which has been published in twelve countries and nine languages. Publishers Weekly described Weihenmayer's memoir as "moving and adventure packed, Weihenmayer tells his extraordinary story with humor, honesty and vivid detail, and his fortitude and enthusiasm are deeply inspiring." The book was made into an A&E movie and released on DVD by Sony.

Weihenmayer's second book, The Adversity Advantage: Turning Everyday Struggles Into Everyday Greatness, shares hard-earned lessons and practical advice for using adversity as fuel for growth and innovation. Stephen Covey, author of The 7 Habits of Highly Effective People, stated, "This book led me to look carefully at myself with an awareness of how the challenges of my life can be the fuel that will enable me to swim against the stream, against cultural currents, against all forms of adversity inherent in my most important goals."

Weihenmayer's latest release, No Barriers: A Blind Man's Journey to Kayak the Grand Canyon, was published in 2017. The book is Weihenmayer's second memoir, and chronicles his descent of the Grand Canyon aimed to encourage those who have encountered obstacles to their goals. Kirkus Reviews, a leading literary trade magazine, wrote: "Weihenmayer presents an exhilarating adventure story of arduous mountain climbing and whitewater kayaking, but he also offers broader life lessons. A wonderful tribute to the greatness of the human spirit."

== Media and film appearances ==
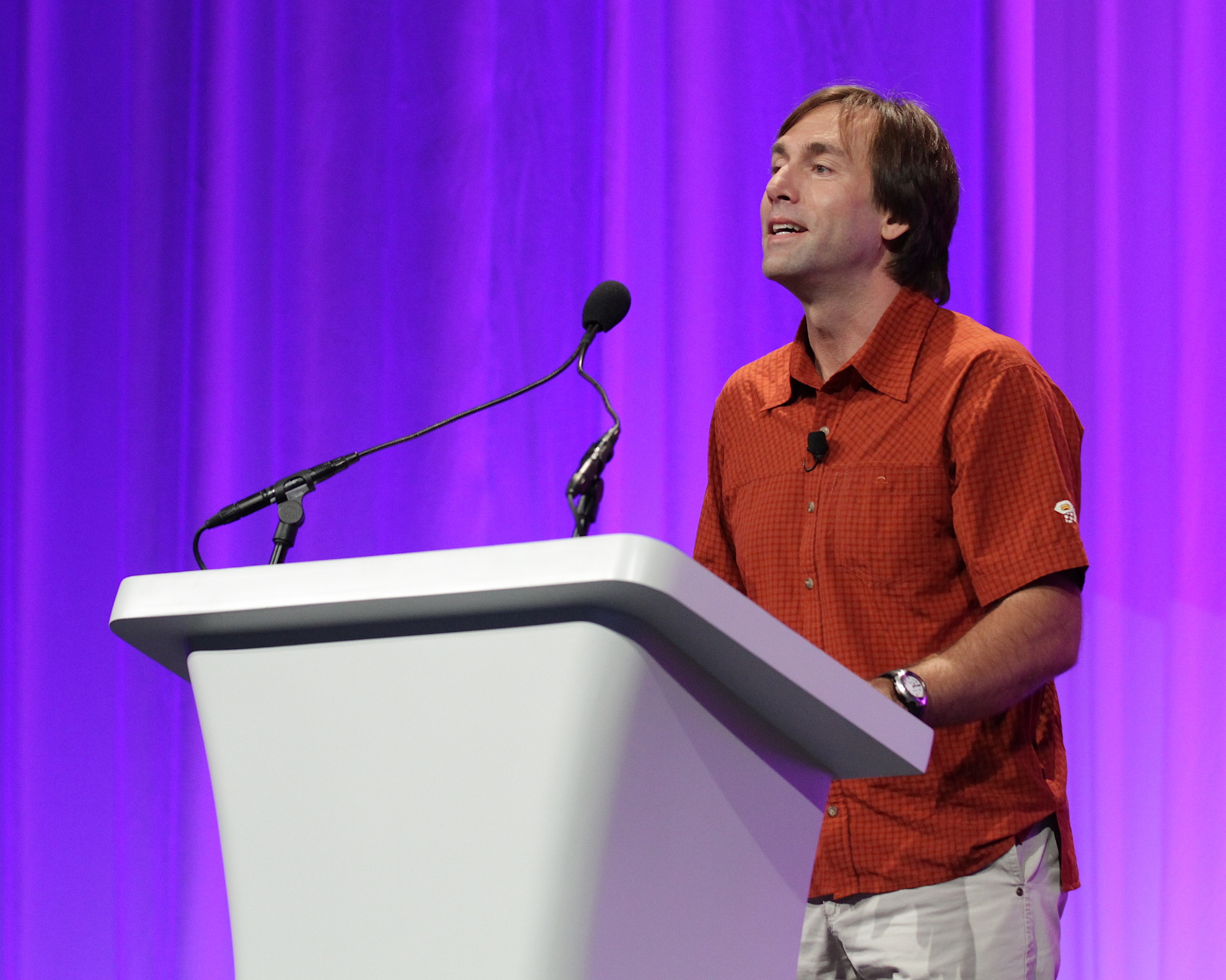
Weihenmayer in 2012

Weihenmayer's adventures have earned him dozens of awards, recognitions, and TV interviews. He has received the ESPY, Nike's Casey Martin award, and the Helen Keller Lifetime Achievement award. He has appeared on NBC's Today Show and Nightly News, Oprah, Good Morning America, Welcome to Earth, Nightline, and The Tonight Show. Weihenmayer was featured on the cover of Time, Outside, and Climbing magazines. He has also carried torches for both the Summer and Winter Olympic Games.

Farther Than the Eye Can See, the documentary of his Everest ascent, is ranked by Men's Journal as one of the top 20 adventure films of all time. The film won first prize at 21 international film festivals and was nominated for two Emmy Awards. In 2004, Weihenmayer and six Everest team members trained a group of blind Tibetan students and then lead them to 22,000 feet on the north side of Everest. Blindsight, the documentary of the ascent, won People's Choice Awards at the Los Angeles, London, and Berlin Film Festivals, and was released in theaters in 2007 to major accolades from film critics.

Weihenmayer was featured in the 2012 award-winning film, High Ground. This film documents a team of injured veterans; led by Weihenmayer and his Everest team, as they embark on a Himalayan climbing expedition, and along the trail, struggle to heal mentally and spiritually from the devastating wounds of war.

In 2017, Weihenmayer was named one of "The 25 Most Adventurous Men of the Past 25 Years" by Men's Journal.

In 2023, Weihenmayer was featured in the movie Life is Climbing about blind climber Koichiro Kobayashi.

== Bibliography ==
- Weihenmayer, Erik, Touch the Top of the World: A Blind Man's Journey to Climb Farther Than the Eye can See, Plume, 2002, ISBN 978-0-452-28294-0
- Weihenmayer, Erik & Stoltz, Paul, The Adversity Advantage: Turning Everyday Struggles into Everyday Greatness, Touchstone, 2006, ISBN 978-0-7432-9022-7
- Weihenmayer, Erik, No Barriers: A Blind Man's Journey to Kayak the Grand Canyon, with St. Martin's Press, 2017, ISBN 978-1250088789, 978-1250088796
- Weihenmayer, Erik, No Barriers (Young Adult Adaptation), with Buddy Levy, St. Martin's Press, 2019, ISBN 978-1250206770

== See also ==
- List of Mount Everest records
