= Andrew H. Eschenfelder =

American physicist (1925-2024)

- Born: Andrew Herbert Eschenfelder; June 13, 1925; Newark, New Jersey, U.S.
- Died: November 1, 2024 (aged 99); Saratoga, California, U.S.
- Education: Rutgers University
- Occupation: Physicist

Andrew Herbert Eschenfelder (June 13, 1925 – November 1, 2024) was an American physicist.

== Life and career ==
Eschenfelder was born in Newark, New Jersey, the son of Andrew Frank Eschenfelder and Grace Helen Griffin. He was raised in Glen Ridge, New Jersey, and he attended Glen Ridge High School, graduating in 1943. After graduating, he enlisted in the United States Navy, and was deployed to the South Pacific during World War II, which after his honorable discharge in 1946, he attended Rutgers University, earning his BS degree in 1949 and his PhD degree in physics in 1952.

Eschenfelder worked at IBM from 1952 to 1981. During his time at IBM, in 1962, he was named a fellow of the American Physical Society, and he served as president of California Institute of Medical Research in San Jose, California.

== Death ==
Eschenfelder died from complications of multiple myeloma in Saratoga, California on November 1, 2024, at the age of 99.
