= George E. Stuart =

American archaeologist and cartographer

- Born: George Edwin Stuart III; April 2, 1935; Glen Ridge, New Jersey
- Died: June 11, 2014 (aged 79); Barnardsville, North Carolina
- Known for: Mesoamerican archaeology, Maya studies, Archaeological mapping
- Spouse(s): Gene S. Stuart (d. 1993); Melinda Young Frye
- Children: Rev. George E. Stuart IV; Roberto Stuart; Ann Stuart; David Stuart; Jason Frye (stepson)

Academic background
- Education: University of South Carolina (B.S.); George Washington University (M.A.); University of North Carolina at Chapel Hill (Ph.D.)
- Doctoral advisor: Joffre Lanning Coe

Academic work
- Discipline: Archaeologist; Cartographer
- Institutions: National Geographic Society

George Edwin Stuart III (April 2, 1935 – June 11, 2014) was an American archaeologist, cartographer, and scholar best known for his contributions to Mesoamerican and Maya archaeology. He was a long-time staff archaeologist and chair of the National Geographic Society's Committee for Research and Exploration, where he played a significant role in funding and advancing archaeological research. Stuart's work as a scholar, editor, and writer significantly shaped public understanding of Maya culture and New World archaeology.

== Early life and education ==
George Stuart was born on April 2, 1935, in Glen Ridge, New Jersey, and raised in Camden, South Carolina. He earned a B.A. in geology from the University of South Carolina in 1956 and later completed an M.A. at George Washington University in 1970. Stuart earned his Ph.D. in anthropology from the University of North Carolina at Chapel Hill, during which time he worked under the guidance of Professor Joffre Lanning Coe. His dissertation, which he completed in 1975, is titled The Post-Archaic Occupation of Central South Carolina, and focuses on the archaeology of central South Carolina, reflecting his early interest in Southeastern U.S. archaeology..

== Career ==
Stuart joined the National Geographic Society (NGS) as a staff archaeologist in 1960, eventually becoming a senior research cartographer and later senior assistant editor for archaeology at National Geographic Magazine. From 1994 to 1998, he chaired the NGS Committee for Research and Exploration, funding numerous archaeological projects, particularly in Mesoamerica. His notable contributions included cartographic works like the "Archaeological Map of Middle America: Land of the Feathered Serpent" (1968).

Stuart co-directed the Coba Archaeological Mapping Project in Quintana Roo, Mexico and played a significant role in advancing the study of Maya hieroglyphs. His publications, including The Mysterious Maya (1977) and Lost Kingdoms of the Maya (1993), shaped public and scholarly understanding of Mesoamerican cultures.

== Publications ==
Stuart authored and co-authored several books, including:

- Discovering Man's Past in the Americas (1969)
- The Mysterious Maya (1977)
- Lost Kingdoms of the Maya (1993)
- Palenque: Eternal City of the Maya (2008) (co-authored with his son, David Stuart)
- Archaeology and You (1996)
- Quest for Decipherment: A Historical and Technical Analysis of Maya Hieroglyphs (1992)

== Contributions to archaeology ==
Stuart's legacy includes founding the Research Reports on Ancient Maya Writing, a monograph series that facilitated Maya hieroglyphic studies. In 1997, he established the Boundary End Archaeology Research Center in Barnardsville, North Carolina, providing a platform for continued research and publications after his retirement.

== Personal life ==
Stuart was married twice: first to Gene S. Stuart, with whom he had four children, including the Maya epigrapher David Stuart. After Gene's passing in 1993, he married Melinda Young Frye in 1994. Stuart was an avid bibliophile, donating his extensive 15,000-volume library to the University of North Carolina's Wilson Library in 2006.

== Death ==
Stuart died at his home in Barnardsville, North Carolina, on June 11, 2014, at the age of 79.

== See also ==
- Maya civilization
