= Frederick Karl Gampper Jr. =

- Born: August 28, 1893
- Died: March 3, 1961 (aged 67)
- Occupation: Dirigible pilot

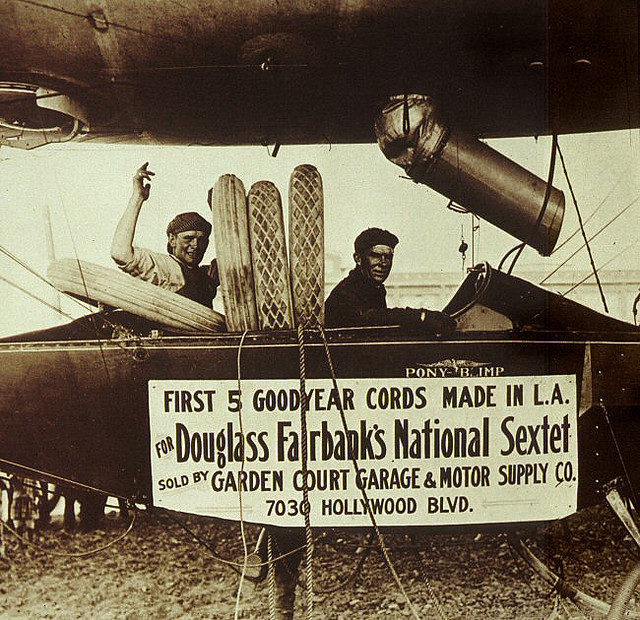
Pony blimp advertisement touting first tires sold to actor Douglas Fairbanks

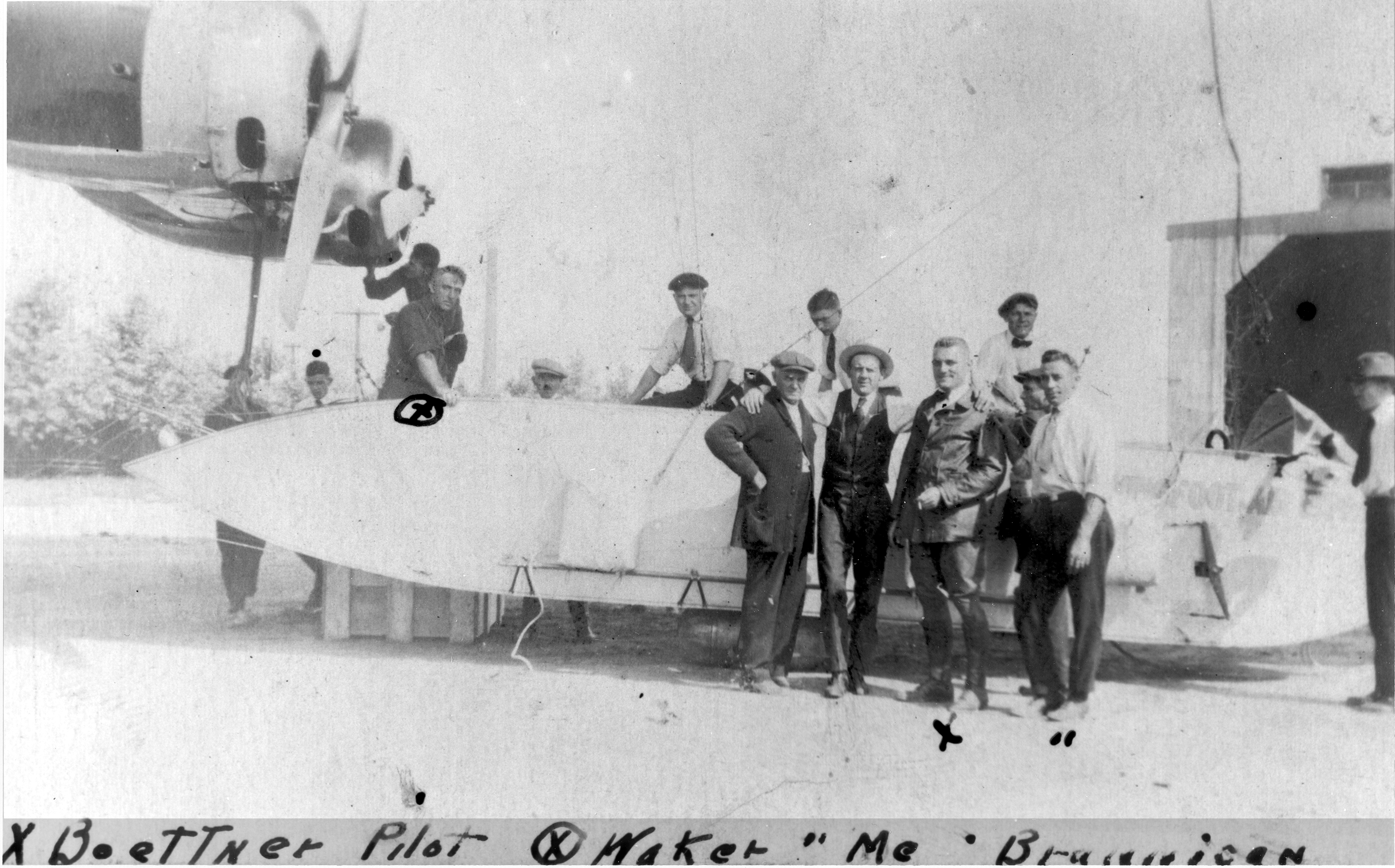
The crew of the ill-fated Wingfoot Air Express shortly before its accident. FK Gampper is identified as "Me".

Frederick Karl Gampper Jr. (28 August 1893 - 3 March 1961) was a dirigible pilot with license #53 issued by the Aero Club of America, and a licensed free balloon pilot. His mentors included Ralph H. Upson and Herman Kraft.

== Biography ==
Frederick Karl Gampper worked for Goodyear from around 1913 to 1921, primarily in their lighter-than-air division. He was supervisor of dirigible operations, liaison to the Navy, pilot and instructor in Key West and Akron at Goodyear's Wingfoot Lake facility from 1917 to 1921. Gampper was chief pilot of the Wingfoot Air Express, an early Goodyear blimp that was to make history in Chicago on Monday, July 21, 1919, when the worst dirigible disaster in United States history occurred on that date. Because the blimp was overweight on this occasion, Gampper had to allow a thinner pilot to make the flight. The highly flammable hydrogen in the blimp ignited over downtown Chicago causing the airship to crash through the skylight of the Illinois Trust and Savings Building. The accident killed one crew member, two passengers, and ten bank employees. In the aftermath of the crash, Chicago changed rules for flights over the city as well as closing the Grant Park Airstrip and creating Chicago Air Park.

Gampper left Goodyear in 1921 to assume the role of chief pilot of the Commercial Airship Syndicate, Ltd., one of the first commercial airlines in the United States. They ran mail and passengers between Kansas City, Missouri and Oklahoma City. The Syndicate's offices were located at the Gumbel Building in Kansas City, and their small Goodyear Pony Blimp was hangared at a location along the river. The company closed after their hangar and blimp were destroyed during a windstorm.

Gampper's greatest contribution to lighter-than-air flight was as a teacher to many of the men who would go on to design, command, and fly America's great dirigibles: the USS Shenandoah (ZR-1), USS Los Angeles (ZR-3), USS Macon (ZRS-5), and USS Akron (ZRS-4).

Much of his collection is with the Smithsonian Air And Space Museum, Washington, D.C. on loan from his grandson, James Michael Gampper. It consists of blueprints, manuals, newspaper articles, brochures and photographs of airships and balloons during the early part of the 20th century. The airships included are the US Army airship Roma, the Wingfoot Express, and the Pony Blimp at Commercial Air Syndicate.
