= Boundary End Archaeology Research Center =

Nonprofit research library and academic press

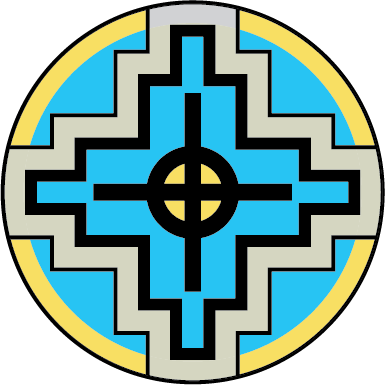
- Abbreviation: BEARC
- Formation: 1997
- Founder: George E. Stuart
- Type: 501(c)(3) Nonprofit organization
- Purpose: Archaeological research on ancient America
- Headquarters: Barnardsville, North Carolina
- Coordinates: 35.7538395°N 82.3855445°W
- Executive Director: Nelda Issa Marengo Camacho
- President: David Stuart
- Website: boundaryend.com

The Boundary End Archaeology Research Center (BEARC) is a research library, educational center, and academic press located in the Blue Ridge Mountains of North Carolina. BEARC is a 501(c)(3) nonprofit organization dedicated to the archaeology, epigraphy, art history, ethnohistory, and historiography of Mesoamerica, the Southeastern United States, and the Andes.

The center is located approximately 15 miles northeast of Asheville, North Carolina.

== History ==
The Boundary End Archaeology Research Center was founded in 1997 by archaeologist George E. Stuart, and it's facilities are is situated on land that once served as the residence of George and Melinda Stuart beginning in 1994. The name "Boundary End" derives from its proximity to the "Coleman Boundary" section of the Pisgah National Forest.

== Mission and Academic Publications ==
According to the center, BEARC has a three-part mission:

1. Provide a peaceful and resourceful work-and-living space for scholars and students pursuing research and writing projects.
2. Organize educational workshops, mini-conferences, symposia, and tours.
3. Publish academic papers, monographs, and research findings resulting from its activities.

BEARC offers long-term residential fellowships through the George Stuart Residential Scholarship, as well as short-term guest scholarships. In addition to its residential scholarships, BEARC funds the Society for American Archaeology's Gene S. Stuart Award, an annual award honoring "outstanding efforts to enhance public understanding of archaeology."

Aside from its fellowship program, BEARC has two academic publication series: Ancient America, focusing on the art and iconography of the Americas, and Research Reports on Ancient Maya Writing, focused on the decipherment of Maya hieroglyphs.

== Library Collection ==
The George Stuart Residential Library at BEARC houses an extensive library of approximately 12,000 volumes specializing in the archaeology of the Americas, with a particular focus on Mesoamerica and Southeastern North America. The collection also includes key works on the archaeology of Africa, Asia, and Europe.

Approximately half of the library consists of the personal working library of George E. Stuart, featuring books on Maya research, site excavation reports, and hieroglyphic decipherment, as well as 19th-century histories of Yucatán and early Southeastern U.S. archaeology. Notable additions to the library include:

- A near-complete set of limited editions by William E. Gates, gifted by Col. William Friedman.
- A unique set of Edward King, Viscount Kingsborough's Antiquities of Mexico (Volumes 1 and 2, dated 1829).
- A copy of Thomas Jefferson's Notes on the State of Virginia (1787), the first work to report archaeological excavation in the Americas.
- Henry Rowe Schoolcraft's six-volume work on the Indigenous peoples of North America (1854–1857).
- A comprehensive collection of institutional publications, including complete runs of journals like American Anthropologist and American Antiquity.
