= David Stuart (Mayanist) =

American archeologist (born 1965)

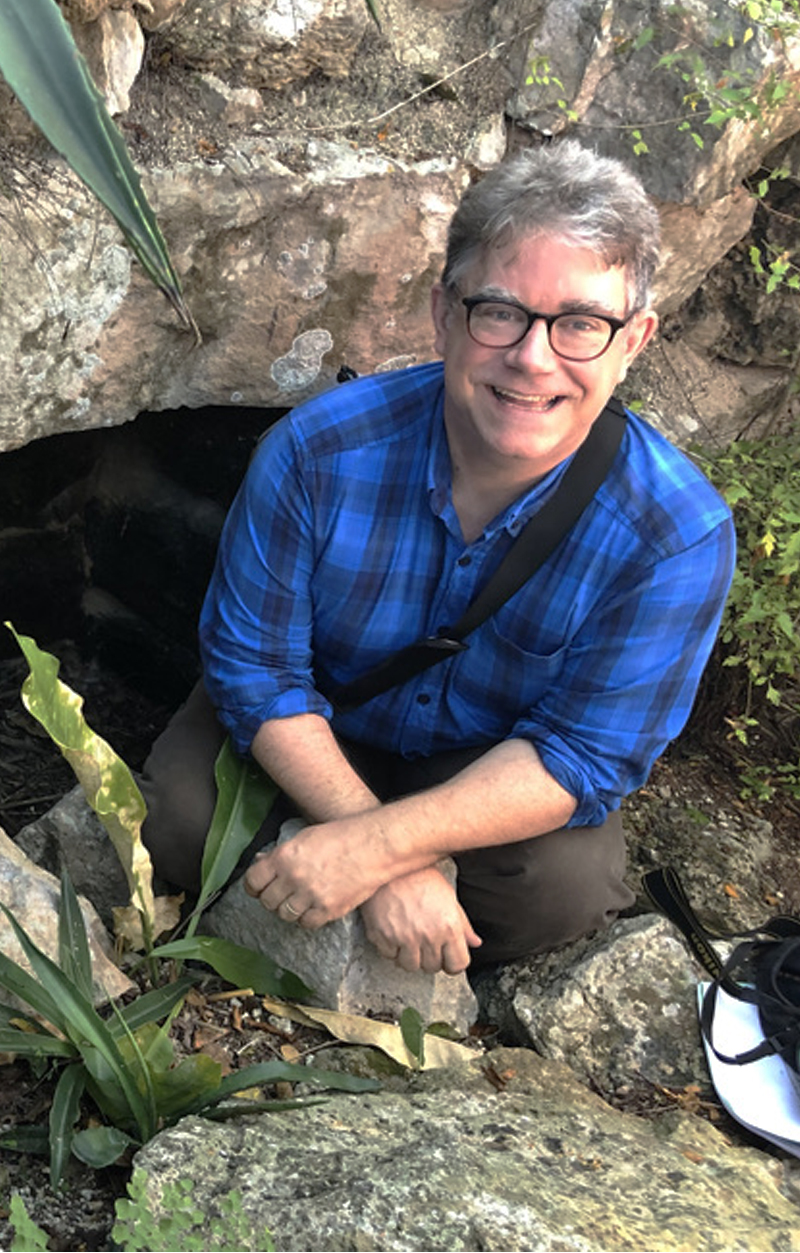
- Stuart in 2019
- Born: 1965 (age 60–61); Washington, D.C., US
- Occupations: Archaeologist; epigrapher; art historian
- Title: Schele Professor of Mesoamerican Art and Writing, Department of Art and Art History, The University of Texas at Austin
- Parents: George E. Stuart; Gene Strickland Stuart
- Awards: MacArthur Fellowship, Guggenheim Fellowship

Academic background
- Education: Princeton University (B.A.); Vanderbilt University (Ph.D.)

David S. Stuart (born 1965) is an archaeologist and epigrapher specializing in the study of ancient Mesoamerica, the area now called Mexico and Central America. His work has studied many aspects of the ancient Maya civilization. He is widely recognized for his breakthroughs in deciphering Maya hieroglyphs and interpreting Maya art and iconography, starting at an early age. He is the youngest person ever to receive a MacArthur Fellowship, at age 18. He currently teaches at the University of Texas at Austin and his current research focuses on the understanding of Maya culture, religion and history through their visual culture and writing system.

== Early life ==
Stuart is the son of the archaeologist George E. Stuart and the writer, artist and illustrator Gene Strickland Stuart, both of whom wrote extensively for the National Geographic Society. He spent much of his childhood accompanying his parents on archaeological digs and expeditions in Mexico and Guatemala. There he developed a deep interest in Maya culture, especially their art and hieroglyphs, absorbing scholarly works beginning at age 10. Shortly thereafter he made original contributions to the field of decipherment and began working closely with the noted Mayanist Linda Schele, focusing on the art of inscriptions of Palenque. Stuart gave his first scholarly paper at the age of 12 at the 1978 Mesa Redonda de Palenque, an international conference of Mesoamerican scholars.

== Research ==
Stuart is best known for his discoveries on the nature of Maya hieroglyphic writing from the 1980s to the present. By 1985 scholars had already generally recognized that there were two types of signs in the script: logograms (word signs) and syllables (consonant-vowel or CV). However, only a limited amount of Maya texts could be read in their original language, Classic Mayan, due to an imprecise understanding of the visual nature of the script, especially the ways signs formed and combined. Stuart demonstrated that signs could have a great many variants and forms, all visually distinct yet functionally equivalent. The recognition of the principles behind graphic variation and structure helped lead to a number of breakthroughs. Stuart proposed the decipherments of many new syllables and logograms in the 1980s and 1990s, which in turn provided a more firm basis for a new wave of linguistic analyses of Maya texts during the 1990s and early 2000s.

Stuart has also contributed a number of studies of Maya art, history and religion, especially at the sites of Copán, Palenque, Tikal, La Corona, San Bartolo and Xultun. in the late 1990s he produced a new interpretation of the history surrounding the Teotihuacan's "arrival" to the Maya area in 378 CE, proposing this was a military overthrow of the local Tikal king, and the establishment of a new political order. Much of Stuart's work focused on the field documentation of Maya sculpture and inscriptions at numerous sites, through epigraphic drawing and photography. He remains actively engaged as a member of several ongoing excavation projects in Guatemala, Honduras and Mexico.

Stuart expanded his research into the iconography and script of central Mexico, especially among the Mexica. In 2018 he presented a new interpretation of the so-called Calendar Stone of Tenochtitlan, suggesting it is not an image of an Aztec deity, but rather a deified portrait of the emperor Moctezuma II as the sun. Stuart emphasizes its role as a political monument and image, the purpose of which was to depict the Tenochca ruler at the center of the cosmos.

In 2024 Stuart's book Spearthrower Owl: A Teotihuacan Ruler in Maya History was published, focusing on the written history surroundoing Maya-Teotihuacan relations. It revisits Stuart's proposals on Early Classic Maya history and the Teotihuacan "Entrada" of 378, first presented in the late 1990s.

His book The Four Heavens: A New History of the Ancient Maya, was published by Princeton University Press in March, 2026. It is a broad overview of the ancient Maya history written for the general reader.

== Career ==
Stuart's early work on the decipherment of Maya writing led to a MacArthur Fellowship in 1984. He is the youngest-ever recipient of that award. His insights into the structure and content of Maya hieroglyphic writing was highlighted in the award-winning documentary film "Breaking the Maya Code" (Night Fire Films, 2008).

After completing his B.A. in Art and Archaeology at Princeton University in 1989, Stuart received his Ph.D. in Anthropology from Vanderbilt University in 1995. At that time he was appointed the Bartlett Curator of Maya Hieroglyphs at the Peabody Museum at Harvard University, and was a senior lecturer at Harvard's Department of Anthropology before beginning at the University of Texas at Austin in 2004.

His many publications include his key early paper Ten Phonetic Syllables (1987), which laid much of the groundwork for the now-accepted methodology of Maya hieroglyphic decipherment. In 2003 he published a volume in the ongoing Corpus of Maya Hieroglyphic Inscriptions series (Peabody Museum, Harvard University), devoted to drawings and photographs of sculpture from Piedras Negras, Guatemala. He co-authored Palenque: Eternal City of the Maya (Thames and Hudson, 2008) with his father, George Stuart. His book The Order of Days (Random House, 2011) explored the important role of time and cosmology in Classic Maya civilization, while also debunking the 2012 phenomenon claim that the Maya viewed 2012 as the end of their elaborate calendar. His latest book is The Four Heavens: A New History of the Ancient Maya, published by Princeton University Press in 2026.

Stuart is currently the director of The Mesoamerica Center at The University of Texas at Austin, which fosters multi-disciplinary studies on ancient American art and culture, and is the executive board president of the Boundary End Archaeology Research Center. He also oversees the activities of the Casa Herrera, UT's academic research center in Antigua, Guatemala, devoted to studies in the art, archaeology and culture of wider Mesoamerica.

== Bibliography ==
- Ten Phonetic Syllables (1987)
- Classic Maya Place Names (Dumbarton Oaks Research Library and Collection, 1994) with Stephen Houston
- Piedras Negras, Vol. 9, part 1, in Corpus of Maya Hieroglyphic Inscriptions series (Peabody Museum, Harvard University), 2003, with Ian Graham
- The Inscriptions from Temple XIX at Palenque (The Pre-Columbian Art Research Institute, 2005)
- Palenque: Eternal City of the Maya (Thames and Hudson, 2008) with George Stuart
- The Memory of Bones: Body, Being, and Experience among the Classic Maya (University of Texas Press, 2011) with Stephen Houston and Karl Taube
- The Order of Days: The Maya World and the Truth about 2012 (Random House – Harmony, 2011)
- King and Cosmos: A New Interpretation of the Aztec Calendar Stone (Precolumbia Mesoweb Press, 2022)
- Spearthrower Owl: A Teotihuacan Ruler in Maya History (Dumbarton Oaks, 2024)
- The Four Heavens: A new History of the Ancient Maya (Princeton University Press, 2026)
