= Bill Sutherland (activist) =

African American pacifist and Pan-African activist (1918-2010)

- Born: William H. Sutherland; December 24, 1918; Glen Ridge, New Jersey, U.S.
- Died: January 2, 2010 (aged 91); Brooklyn, New York, U.S.
- Education: Bates College
- Occupations: Pacifist and Pan-African activist
- Spouse: Efua Sutherland
- Children: Ralph Sutherland; Esi Sutherland-Addy; Amowi Sutherland Phillips

William H. Sutherland Jr. (December 24, 1918 – January 2, 2010) was an African American pacifist and Pan-African activist. He was a co-founder (along with George Houser) of Americans for South African Resistance in 1953, which merged with other organizations to become Africa Action in 2001. He was also active in the Congress of Racial Equality, Peace Brigades International, among other organizations.

== Early life ==
Sutherland's father was a dentist and he was raised in Glen Ridge, New Jersey, along with his two siblings Reiter and Muriel. Author Howard W. French notes that Sutherland "joined the NAACP in New Jersey as a teenager, participating in movements to save the Scottsboro Boys at the end of the 1930s, as well as a Gandhian commune in Newark that was opposed to the Second World War." Young Sutherland began to link US civil rights to the anti-colonial movement, and non-violent action and civil disobedience remained an influence throughout his life. He graduated from Glen Ridge High School in 1936.

Upon graduating from Bates College in 1940, he joined the American Friends Service Committee (AFSC), beginning an enduring relationship with them.

== Non-violence and Pan-Africanism ==
Sutherland was sentenced in August 1942 as a conscientious objector during World War II after refusing to participate in a Civilian Public Service camp program as an alternative to military service. He was imprisoned for four years at the Lewisburg Federal Correctional Facility in Pennsylvania. Outspoken about the war and racial discrimination, he was given "[d]ouble the penalty imposed on anyone else up to that time for refusing induction into the military." "Sutherland fasted to protest the violence and Jim Crow conditions he was subjected to [in prison]." This period was documented in the film The Good War and Those Who Refused to Fight It. While in prison, he befriended other pacifists, such as David Dellinger, Ralph DiGia and George Houser, with whom he would later organize for nuclear disarmament. In 1951, in the early days of the Cold War, Sutherland, DiGia, Dellinger, and Quaker pacifist Art Emery constituted the Peacemaker Bicycle Project, which took the message of nuclear disarmament to both sides of the Iron Curtain.

In London in 1951, he learned that the African National Congress (ANC) and the South African Indian Congress (SAIC) planned a civil disobedience campaign using the same Gandhian non-violent direct action that the Fellowship of Reconciliation (FOR) and the Congress on Racial Equality (CORE) had been utilising in the US. William Minter, editor of AfricaFocus Bulletin, adds, "Sutherland's contacts helped spark the formation of Americans for South African Resistance (AFSAR).... He was given a list of contacts in South Africa, including Walter Sisulu of the ANC." Returning to the United States, Sutherland successfully urged George Houser and Bayard Rustin, his colleagues at CORE, to organize a group to support the Defiance Campaign, among others.

Sutherland moved to Ghana (then known as the Gold Coast) in 1953 in coordination with War Resisters International with an introduction to Kwame Nkrumah from George Padmore. While living there, Sutherland worked as a secretary to the Ghanaian Finance Minister, Komla Agbeli Gbedemah, resigning from that position when he and Bayard Rustin began working on the anti-nuclear Sahara Protest Team. In the conference paper "Nuclear Imperialism and the Pan-African Struggle for Freedom 1959–1962", Dr. Allman, professor emerita of Washington University, credits Sutherland and Rustin for their work with President Nkrumah in developing a Pan-African vision that was both anti-colonial and anti-nuclear weapons.

As a member of the African American expatriate community, he helped arrange the visit of Rev. Dr. Martin Luther King Jr. and Coretta Scott King for the 1957 celebration of Ghana's independence and introduced them to Julius Nyerere (soon to be President of Tanzania).

== Tanzania and the Frontline States ==
In 1963 Sutherland moved to Dar es Salaam, Tanzania, where he held a number of government posts including Advisor to the Tanganyika Delegation to the General Assembly of the United Nations and Refugee and Resettlement Officer in the Vice President's office. He helped develop the Pan-African Freedom Movement of East and Central Africa, the group campaigning for the independence of the countries in East and Central Africa.

French describes how Sutherland played a role in hosting Malcolm X in 1964 in Ghana and Tanzania, and credits Sutherland with participating in anti-apartheid advocacy connected to the international campaign to nominate Bishop Desmond Tutu for the Nobel Peace Prize.

Sutherland continued to connect with other leaders throughout Africa such as Kenneth Kaunda, Agustinho Neto, Nathan Shamuyarira, Joshua Nkomo, Sam Nujoma, Walter Sisulu, along with peers in the civil rights and Pan African movements such as Bishop Tutu, Rustin, C.L.R. James, George Padmore, and Jesse Jackson.

In 1974 Sutherland re-joined the American Friends Service Committee as an international representative to garner support for the liberation struggles in the Frontline States. He worked with liberation movements in countries still under colonial or white minority rule, namely South West Africa (now Namibia), Southern Rhodesia (now Zimbabwe), and South Africa.

Sutherland received an honorary doctorate from Bates College in 1983 and in 1984 was named a Fellow at the Harvard Kennedy Institute of Politics. In 2009 he received the War Resisters League Peace Award. In 2000, he published, along with Matt Meyer, Guns and Gandhi in Africa: Pan-African Insights on Nonviolence, Armed Struggle and Liberation, a book which examined the various anti-colonial strategies in Africa.

Bishop Desmond Tutu sent a tribute on Sutherland's 90th birthday celebrations, noting that: "the people of Africa owe Bill Sutherland a big thank you for his tireless support."

== Personal life and death ==
Sutherland died on January 2, 2010. He was 91.
