= Hattie Meyers Junkin =

Pioneer female aviator

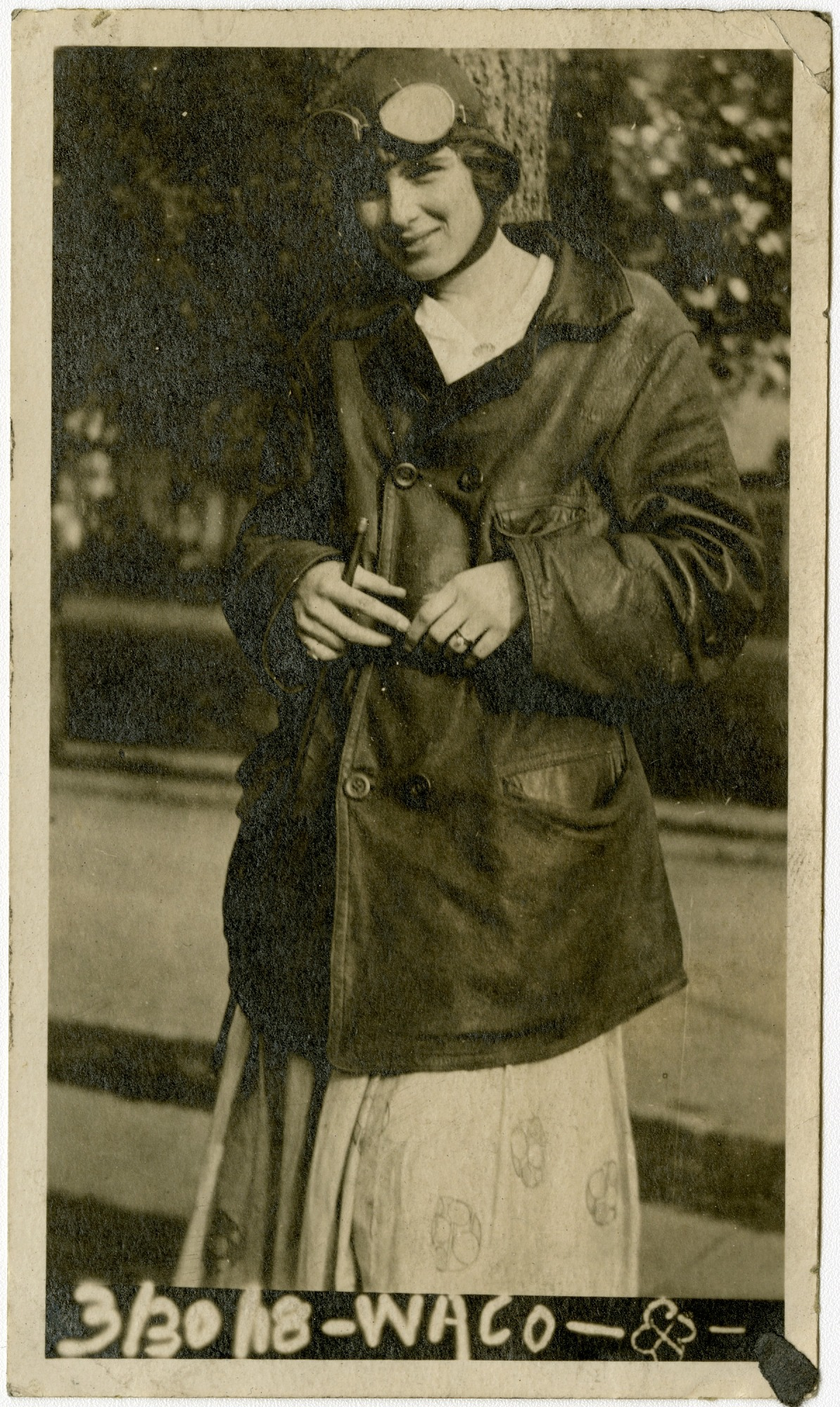
Aviator Hattie Meyers Junkin

Hattie Meyers Weaver Junkin (1896–1990) was a pioneer female aviator and the first woman to earn a glider class C license.

== Early life ==
Hattie Meyers was born in Glen Ridge, New Jersey. As a child, she built model airplanes with her brother, Charlie.

== Aviation career ==
Hattie and her first husband, George "Buck" Weaver, lived in Waco, Texas, while he was stationed at Camp MacArthur. Buck was a US Naval reservist who worked in aviation during World War I. After the war, the couple moved to Chicago, where their son was born. The family relocated again to Ohio where Buck, Elwood J. "Sam" Junkin, and Clayton J. Brukner, founded the Weaver Aircraft Company (WACO).George died on July 31, 1924, after which Hattie married Sam Junkin. Junkin died soon after their daughter was born.

In 1929, Hattie began her short-lived marriage to third husband, Ralph Stanton Barnaby, a glider pilot and naval aviator. After marrying, they moved to Washington DC where Hattie met well-known flyer Betty Gillies. Gillies introduced Hattie to glider piloting. Hattie went on to earn her glider class C license in 1931 making her the first woman to earn a 'C' rating.

== Death and legacy ==
Hattie died in 1985.

Hattie often wrote about her life and the history of the Weaver Aircraft Company. Her papers are held in the collection of the Smithsonian National Air and Space Museum.
