= Priscilla Roberts =

American artist

- Born: Priscilla Warren Roberts; June 13, 1916; Glen Ridge, New Jersey
- Died: August 5, 2001 (aged 85); Georgetown, Connecticut
- Education: Art Students League of New York, National Academy of Design
- Known for: Painting
- Movement: Realism

Priscilla Roberts (1916–2001) was an American artist known for her still life paintings. She employed a precise style in which fanciful objects were juxtaposed in a manner that was seen to approach surrealism and that was often called magic realist. (Note: Sources for these assertions: Wilton Bulletin (1 April 1981 and 16 August 2001), dartily blog (13 June 2017), Arts Magazine (1960), Smithsonian American Art Museum artist biography, Priscilla Roberts: Magic Realist (1981), Franklin Riehlman Fine Art.) In 1960, a critic writing for Arts Magazine said, "There can hardly be any doubt that Priscilla Roberts is the most talented and accomplished Magic Realist in America."

== Early life ==
Roberts was born in Glen Ridge, New Jersey, but spent most of her youth in New York City. (Note: Roberts' parents lived in Manhattan before her birth and returned there when she was still young.) Her father, Charles Asaph Roberts, was a partner in the law firm of Cravath, Swaine & Moore and her mother, Mary Florence Berry Robert (known as Florence) kept house. (Note: Her father received his undergraduate (1902) and law (1906) degrees from Yale University. Her mother was a 1911 graduate of Mount Holyoke College.) Her only sibling, Alice Parsons Roberts, was four years older. During a period when Roberts was kept at home to recover from a bout of acidosis, her mother made a scrapbook of Good Housekeeping advertisements to help keep her occupied and this, she later said, was the probable beginning of her ambition to become an artist.

== Art training ==
In the mid-1930s Roberts attended Radcliffe College for one year and transferred to the Yale School of Art for part of the next. In 1937, she began study at the Art Students League, working under Charles Courtney Curran and Sidney Dickinson. Two years later she began study at the National Academy of Design, continuing there until 1943.

== Artistic career ==
Priscilla Roberts, Untitled (Man With a Broken Plate), about 1946, oil on masonite, 30 x 22 inches

Priscilla Roberts, Self Portrait, 1946, oil on masonite, 29 7/8 x 14 1/8 inches

Priscilla Roberts, Lay Figure, 1950, oil on masonite, 30 x 25 inches

Priscilla Roberts, Tintinabulum, 1964, oil on masonite, 14 x 9 1/2 inches

After completing study at the National Academy, Roberts found work as a commercial artist. An untitled painting showing a man with a broken plate (at left) shows her style in this manner. She discovered, however, that the pressure of working to deadlines did not suit her and consequently turned to fine art. Her self portrait of 1946, shown at right, was one of the first paintings she offered for sale in a commercial gallery. It has transitional style elements. The presence of a human figure (herself) and use of natural light are marks of her early style while the meticulous rendering of the stuffed birds and the heavy shadowing are marks of the mature style she adopted in later years.

In 1946 Roberts signed with an artists' cooperative, the Grand Central Art Galleries, then located on the sixth floor of Grand Central Terminal in Manhattan. When in 1948 she moved from an apartment in New York's Hell's Kitchen neighborhood to suburban Wilton, Connecticut, she continued her association with the Galleries and they remained the only commercial outlet of her work for the rest of her life. Her paintings were usually purchased as soon as she completed them. However, because she worked very slowly, taking a year or more to complete a single painting, her income remained low and for many years she was unable to assemble enough work to justify a solo exhibition. In 1981 she told a reporter, "I do everything slowly... A teacher told me in school...that drawing is the finest spiritual exercise. And it is."

Her mature style is indicated in the painting of 1950, shown at left, called "Lay Figure." It is similar to the 1946 self portrait in the presence of a draped figure and the predominance of shadow. However the work is a still life, not a portrait. The figure is a manikin clothed in an antique dress and it is surrounded by an odd assortment of objects that are themselves antiques. (Note: The dress had been made by the high-fashion House of Worth. Portrait artists used lay figures so that their sitters would not have to be present for much of the time the painting was made.)

"Tintinabulum," of 1964, shown at right, is typical of Roberts' late work. It shows a female manikin head with a Gay Nineties hat along with the type of doorbell formerly used by shopkeepers to announce the entrance of a customer (Note: Tintinnabula are small bells used in Catholic basilicas. Note that Roberts misspelled the title. It should be tintinnabulum not tintinabulum.) As one source says, her mature paintings seem at first glance to be surreal but on closer observation show themselves to be hyper-realistic, both high in contrast and, on close inspection, revealing surprising details. After she had moved to Connecticut, Roberts would explore antique shops, flea markets, thrift stores, and yard sales to find unusual objects to use in her still lifes. She became a familiar presence in Wilton Center and there acquired both supporters and friends, people whose help became an important factor in her life when the cottage where she lived was sold to developers and, because of her many pets, it was difficult for her to find a new place to live. (Note: A pet lover, she adopted stray cats and other animals, calculating that in the end she had provided home for more than 60 various pets.) She was given her first solo exhibition at Grand Central Galleries in 1961 and a second twenty years later. In neither case did she attend the opening. Although she would personally deliver her paintings to the gallery (Note: She used the local train bring her paintings from Wilton to Grand Central Terminal. Having learned that 30- by 36-inch frames were the largest she could bring by that means, she was careful to keep all of them that size or smaller.) and was well known to its staff, she did not like to mix in the New York art world, saying, "I think the lower profile you keep the better for yourself and your work." Despite her low earnings and hardships she encountered in making a living as an artist she said her devotion to her work led her to lead "the happiest life there could be." (Note: She added, "You feel very happy when you're painting. You feel something else working through you.")

She did not use the term magic realism to describe her work, but called her meticulous style "super-realism." She blacked out the windows of her studio and used precisely-controlled artificial light so that she could replicate the light exactly as she saw it, consistently over many hours at her easel. Most of her paintings were easel art, made in oil paint applied with brush on masonite board. Although the tone of her work was often somber, evoking the passage of time, she would also sometimes treat her subjects in a light and playful manner, juxtaposing objects so as to make visual puns.

Late in life, Roberts left Wilton for nearby Georgetown, Connecticut. The move brought her close to her sister, Alice, who had made her home there for many years. (Note: Roberts and her sister had lived together in an apartment in Wilton Center during the 1950s and she may have been living with her again in the years before her death.) Roberts died in Georgetown on August 5, 2001, and was buried in a family plot at Kensico Cemetery, Valhalla, New York.

Roberts was invited to exhibit at the 131st annual exhibition held by the National Academy of Design and the following year was made an Academy member. Her paintings are held in collections of the Metropolitan Museum of Art, the Smithsonian American Art Museum, the Dallas Museum of Art, The Butler Institute of American Art, the Canton Museum of Art (Ohio), the Walker Art Center, IBM Corp., and the Westmoreland Museum of American Art.
