= R. Bruce Dold =

American journalist (1955–2025)

- Born: March 9, 1955; Newark, New Jersey, U.S.
- Died: December 3, 2025 (aged 70); Winnetka, Illinois, U.S.
- Education: Northwestern University (BS, MS)
- Occupations: Journalist; publisher
- Years active: 1978–2020
- Spouse: Eileen Claire Norris (m. 1982)
- Children: 2

Robert Bruce Dold (March 9, 1955 – December 3, 2025) was an American Pulitzer Prize–winning journalist and the publisher and editor-in-chief of the Chicago Tribune.

== Early life and education ==
Robert Bruce Dold was born in Newark, New Jersey, on March 9, 1955, to Robert Bruce Dold and Margaret (née Noll). He grew up in Glen Ridge, New Jersey. From 1973 to 1978 he attended Northwestern University in Evanston, Illinois, where he received a B.S. and M.S. in Journalism.

== Professional career ==
Dold was hired as a suburban reporter by the Chicago Tribune in 1978. He also contributed to Downbeat Magazine as a jazz critic. The Tribune hired him as a regular reporter in 1983, and he became a political writer before joining the editorial board in 1990. In 1995, he became deputy editorial page editor and columnist at the Tribune. In 1993, while a member of the editorial board, he wrote a 10-part series that won the Pulitzer for editorial writing. The citation read: "For his series of editorials deploring the murder of a 3-year-old boy by his abusive mother and decrying the Illinois child welfare system".

In 2000, Dold was named editorial page editor. The Tribune subsequently earned a dozen national awards for editorials. It received the 2003 Pulitzer Prize for editorial writing and was a finalist for the Pulitzer Prize in editorial writing in 2009, 2010 and 2011. During his tenure as editorial page editor, the paper endorsed Illinois Senator Barack Obama for president in 2008, the first time the paper had ever endorsed a Democratic presidential candidate, and also endorsed his re-election in 2012.

In February 2016, Dold was named editor of the Chicago Tribune, following former Tribune editor-in-chief Gerould Kern. He was subsequently named the paper's publisher. In 2020, Alden Global Capital acquired Tribune Publishing and replaced much of the paper's leadership, including Dold.

== Personal life and death ==
Dold, who was Roman Catholic, married Eileen Claire Norris in 1982, whom he had met when they were both reporters covering the Chicago suburbs. They had two daughters and lived in La Grange Park, Illinois.

Dold died at the home of one of his daughters in Winnetka, Illinois, on December 3, 2025, at the age of 70, from esophageal cancer, which he had had for four years.
