= George S. Parlin =

American securities lawyer (c. 1901 – 1979)

- Born: c. 1901; Wisconsin, United States
- Died: 1979 (aged 78); Hightstown, New Jersey, United States
- Education: University of Pennsylvania (1921)Harvard Law School (1924)
- Occupation: Securities lawyer
- Employer: U.S. Securities and Exchange Commission
- Military career
- Allegiance: United States
- Branch: United States Army
- Rank: Colonel
- Conflicts: World War II

George S. Parlin (c. 1901 – 1979) was an American securities lawyer associated with the early development of federal securities regulation in the United States. He served for three decades with the U.S. Securities and Exchange Commission, including as assistant general counsel and assistant regional administrator of the commission's New York office. During World War II he served in the United States Army, attaining the rank of colonel.

== Early life and education ==
Parlin was born in Wisconsin, son of Daisy (née Blackwood) and Charles Coolidge Parlin. He had a brother Charles and two sisters, Ruth and Grace. His father served with Herbert Hoover in the United States Food Administration during the years of the First World War.

Parlin graduated from the Wharton School of the University of Pennsylvania in 1921 and from Harvard Law School in 1924.

== Legal career ==
After passing the bar examination, Parlin joined the New York corporate law firm Cravath, Henderson, De Gersdorff & Wood, where he practiced for several years. Afterwards, he was affiliated with Cotton and Franklin.

A resident of Glen Ridge, New Jersey, he was appointed in 1935 to a position at the U.S. Securities and Exchange Commission spending a year in Washington, then moving to New York as assistant regional administrator of the commission's New York office.

Over the course of 30 years working at the SEC, he served as a senior interpretive attorney, assistant regional administrator and subsequently became assistant general counsel of the Commission.

== Military service ==
During World War II, Parlin served in the rank of major in the United States Army. He was assigned to the Allied Military Government in Rome, later attaining the rank of colonel.

== Personal life ==
In 1944, while stationed in Rome during World War II, Parlin's son, Edward, an Eagle Scout, died following a fall during a hiking trip near Lake George, New York.

Parlin lived for many years in the New York City area, moving later to the Meadow Lakes retirement community in Hightstown, New Jersey. His wife, Dorothy Elkcome Parlin, died in 1974.

== Death ==
Parlin died in 1979 at the age of 78 at the Meadow Lakes retirement community in Hightstown, New Jersey.
