= George P. Jenkins =

American businessman (1915-2009)

George Pollock Jenkins
- Born: February 24, 1915; Clarksburg, West Virginia, U.S.
- Died: October 14, 2009 (aged 94); Glen Ridge, New Jersey, U.S.
- Education: Princeton University (BA); Harvard Business School (MBA)
- Occupation: Business executive
- Employer: Metropolitan Life Insurance Company
- Title: Chairman and Chief Investment Officer of MetLife

George Pollock Jenkins (February 24, 1915 – October 14, 2009) was an American business executive who helped broaden the firm's investment portfolio as chief investment officer and later chairman of the Metropolitan Life Insurance Company, helping major companies expand through the development of the private placement and purchasing New York City bonds during the city's 1970s fiscal crisis.

== Biography ==
Jenkins was born on February 24, 1915, in Clarksburg, West Virginia, and attended Blair Academy, a private boarding high school in Blairstown, New Jersey. He attended Princeton University and earned his undergraduate degree in economics as a member of Phi Beta Kappa and earned a graduate degree from Harvard Business School. He was named vice chairman in May 1969.

He was hired by Metropolitan Life in 1938 and was named as an office of the company in 1951. He was named financial vice president in November 1961 effective at the start of the new year and was named as a director in April 1964. He became chairman in 1973 and stepped down from that post in 1980 when he reached the age of 65 and was succeeded in that position by Richard R. Shinn.

In his investment role at Metropolitan Life, he helped develop the market for private placements, allowing major companies to sell securities directly to institutional investors, bypassing the securities markets. Some of the companies that he helped develop included the expansion of the American Broadcasting Company into a major network and the international expansion of Pan American World Airways. He was one of the primary individuals behind the formation of the Municipal Assistance Corporation, which was created by the State of New York in 1975 and allowed the New York City to get access to borrow funds on a short-term basis that it needed during the 1970s financial crisis.

A longtime resident of Glen Ridge, New Jersey, Jenkins died there at age 94 on October 14, 2009, due to heart failure. He was survived by his wife of 64 years, the former Marian O'Brien; his sister, Ellen Jenkins Smith; his sons James, Robert and Richard; and seven grandchildren; Millicent, Augustus, Lucas, Annabelle, Emma, Gregory and Charlotte.
