= Glen Ridge High School =

High school in Essex County, New Jersey, US

Location
- 200 Ridgewood Avenue; Glen Ridge, Essex County, New Jersey 07028; United States; 40.799017°N 74.206059°W

Information
- Type: Public high school
- Established: 1895
- NCES School ID: 340594002092
- Principal: John Lawlor
- Faculty: 74.0 FTEs
- Grades: 7 - 12
- Enrollment: 799 (as of 2024–25)
- Student to teacher ratio: 10.8:1
- Colors: Red and white
- Athletics conference: Super Essex Conference (general); North Jersey Super Football Conference (football)
- Mascot: Ridger
- Team name: Ridgers
- Publication: In Between (literary magazine)
- Website: grhs.glenridge.org/o/grhs

Glen Ridge High School (GRHS) is a comprehensive six-year public middle school / high school serving students in seventh through twelfth grades from Glen Ridge, in Essex County, in the U.S. state of New Jersey, operating as the lone secondary school of the Glen Ridge Public Schools. The school is accredited by the New Jersey Department of Education.

As of the 2024–25 school year, the school had an enrollment of 799 students and 74.0 classroom teachers (on an FTE basis), for a student–teacher ratio of 10.8:1. There were 3 students (0.4% of enrollment) eligible for free lunch and 0 (0.0% of students) eligible for reduced-cost lunch.

The school's standardized test scores exceed both the state and national averages. The Class of 2013's average SAT scores were 575 on the math section, 579 on the critical reading section and 565 on writing, totaling 1719 on the three sections combined (compared to a New Jersey averages of 495 math, 521 reading and 496 writing for 1512 overall). Among students taking the SAT, 69% of students met or exceed the combined score of 1550 considered by the College Board to indicate likely college success, vs. 44% statewide. The graduation rate for the class of 2013 was 97%, with 91.2% of students passing the New Jersey High School Proficiency Assessment (HSPA).

== History ==
After Glen Ridge was established as a borough in 1895 and an independent school district was formed, students in grades 9-12 were sent to attend Montclair High School on a tuition basis. Constructed in 1900, the Glen Ridge School served students in all 12 grades; the building, as expanded, became Glen Ridge High School in the 1920s. A 1966 referendum approved the construction of a new high school building, which was completed at a cost of $2.8 million (equivalent to $25.9 million in 2025) and opened in November 1968, at which point the old building was repurposed as Glen Ridge Middle School.

== Awards, recognition and rankings ==
The school was named one of America's Most Challenging High Schools by the Washington Post, ranked 16th in New Jersey and 508th nationally. It was also named one of the Best High Schools by U.S. News & World Report, 14th in New Jersey and 317th nationally. The school was ranked 30th Best Public School in New Jersey by Niche.com, while the school's teachers were ranked 10th best in the state. The school had been ranked 12th in the state of 328 schools in 2012, after being ranked 4th in 2010 out of 322 schools listed. The magazine ranked the school 5th in 2008 out of 316 schools. The school was ranked 10th in the magazine's September 2006 issue, which included 316 schools across the state. Schooldigger.com ranked the school tied for 113th out of 381 public high schools statewide in its 2011 rankings (a decrease of 21 positions from the 2010 ranking) which were based on the combined percentage of students classified as proficient or above proficient on the mathematics (87.9%) and language arts literacy (94.0%) components of the High School Proficiency Assessment (HSPA).

In the 2011 "Ranking America's High Schools" issue by The Washington Post, the school was ranked 37th in New Jersey and 1,193rd nationwide. The school was ranked 452nd in Newsweek's 2009 ranking of the top 1,500 high schools in the United States and was the 10th-ranked school in New Jersey, with 2.219 AP tests taken in 2008 per graduating senior and 30% of all graduating seniors passing at least one AP exam; The school was ranked 751st nationwide in 2008. In Newsweek's 2007 ranking of the country's top 1,200 high schools, Glen Ridge High School was listed in 871st place, the 23rd-highest ranked school in New Jersey.

In its 2013 report on "America's Best High Schools", The Daily Beast ranked the school 836th in the nation among participating public high schools and 62nd among schools in New Jersey. The school was ranked 255th in the nation and 24th in New Jersey on the list of "America's Best High Schools 2012" prepared by The Daily Beast / Newsweek, with rankings based primarily on graduation rate, matriculation rate for college and number of Advanced Placement / International Baccalaureate courses taken per student, with lesser factors based on average scores on the SAT / ACT, average AP/IB scores and the number of AP/IB courses available to students.

== Athletics ==
The Glen Ridge High School Ridgers compete in the Super Essex Conference, which consists of public and private high schools in Essex County and operates under the New Jersey State Interscholastic Athletic Association (NJSIAA). Prior to the NJSIAA's 2010 realignment, the school had competed in the Colonial Hills Conference which included public and private high schools covering Essex County, Morris County and Somerset County in west Central Jersey. With 407 students in grades 10–12, the school was classified by the NJSIAA for the 2019–20 school year as Group II for most athletic competition purposes, which included schools with an enrollment of 75 to 476 students in that grade range. The football team competes in the Ivy White division of the North Jersey Super Football Conference, which includes 112 schools competing in 20 divisions, making it the nation's biggest football-only high school sports league. The football team is one of the 12 programs assigned to the two Ivy divisions starting in 2020, which are intended to allow weaker programs ineligible for playoff participation to compete primarily against each other. The school was classified by the NJSIAA as Group I North for football for 2024–2026, which included schools with 254 to 474 students. The mascot is the Ridger (a two-headed zebra).

The school participates in a joint ice hockey team with Verona High School as the host school / lead agency. The co-op program operates under agreements scheduled to expire at the end of the 2023–24 school year. The co-op hockey team competes in the NJIHL Kelly Division. Each year the team hosts the Holiday Tournament at the Richard J. Codey Arena in West Orange. The 2004–2005 season saw the team win its first conference championship. The Verona / Glen Ridge co-op ice hockey team won the McMullen Cup in 2009, the Kelly Cup in 2020, 2022, 2024 and the McInnis Cup in 2016. In February 2024, the team outlasted the Glen Rock High School Panthers to win the Kelly Cup in the longest ice hockey game in state history, winning 2-1 in the fifth overtime period.

The boys track team won the Group III spring / outdoor track state championship in 1923, 1924 and 1929, and won the Group I title in 1951, 1959-1966 and 1968. The 15 state titles won by the program are the third-most statewide, while the eight consecutive titles won from 1959 to 1966 is the longest streak in the state.

The boys' basketball team won the Group I state championship in 1944 (against Dumont High School in the finals of the playoffs), 1958 (vs. Dunellen High School) and 1988 (vs. Burlington Township High School). The 1944 team won the Group I title before a crowd of 1,200 at the Elizabeth Armory with a 41–40 victory against Dumont in the championship game. The 1958 team defeated Dunellen by a score of 80–68 in the finals to win the Group I title. In 1988, the team finished at 24-3 after defeating Burlington Township 59–58 in the Group I finals played at Rider College.

The baseball team won the North II Group I sectional title in 1959, 1961, 1963, 1964 and 1969. The team won the Group I state championship in 1975 (defeating runner-up Manville High School in the tournament final), 1981 (vs. Kingsway Regional High School), 1983 (vs. Burlington Township High School), 1988 (vs. Penns Grove High School) and 1993 (vs. Audubon High School). The program's five state titles is tied for 10th-most statewide.

The football team won the NJSIAA North II Group I state sectional championships in 1977, 1980 and 1982.

The boys tennis team won the Group I state championship in 1978 (against runner-up Penns Grove High School by 4 1/2-1/2 in the final match of the tournament) and 1979 (opponent not specified).

The girls' soccer team won the Group I state championships in 2001 (defeating Pennsville High School in the tournament final), in 2012 (vs. Shore Regional High School) and 2013 (as co-champion with Shore Regional). In 2007, the team won the North II, Group I state sectional championship with a 3–1 win over second-seeded North Arlington High School in the tournament final.

The girls tennis team won the Group I state championship in 2009 (against Point Pleasant Beach High School in the final match of the tournament) and 2013 (vs. Pennsville Memorial High School).

The girls' lacrosse team won the Group I state championship in both 2011 and 2012, defeating Pingry School both years in the tournament final.

The boys' lacrosse team defeated Mountain Lakes High School to win the Group I state championship in 2011.

The boys soccer team won the Group I state title in 2019, defeating runner-up Bound Brook High School by a score of 2–1 in the tournament championship game, the program's first finals appearance.

== Glen Ridge rape case ==
In 1989, a group of football players from the school were involved in the sexual assault of a developmentally disabled female student, with three of the athletes convicted of sexual assault in the case. Author Bernard Lefkowitz wrote about their crime in Our Guys: The Glen Ridge Rape and the Secret Life of the Perfect Suburb, which was later produced as Our Guys, a 1999 made-for-television movie. The case was the basis for the Season Eight Law & Order episode "Damaged", starring Lauren Ambrose in the role of the mentally disabled student.

== Administration ==
The school's principal is John Lawlor. Core members of the school's administration team include the assistant principal.

== Notable alumni ==
- Peter Anderson (born 1963), former American football center who was a consensus All-American while playing for the Georgia Bulldogs in 1985
- Tom Cruise (born 1962 as Thomas Cruise Mapother IV), actor and producer
- Gary Cuozzo (born 1941), former NFL quarterback
- Michael J. Doherty (born 1963, class of 1981), Surrogate of Warren County, who served in the New Jersey Senate from 2009 to 2022
- Joe Dubuque (born 1982), amateur wrestler who competes as "The Champ"
- Andrew H. Eschenfelder (1925–2024), physicist and fellow of the American Physical Society
- Sean Gleeson (born 1986), senior analyst for the Northwestern Wildcats football team
- George Helmy (born 1979), politician who served as a United States senator from New Jersey from August to December 2024
- Ezra Koenig (born 1984), lead singer of Vampire Weekend
- Kelly Ann Livingstone (born 1998), professional soccer player
- Rudy Mancuso (born 1992), actor, producer, internet personality, comedian and musician best known for his comedic videos on YouTube
- Kathy Mueller Rohan (class of 1974), former professional tennis player
- Bill Sutherland (1918–2010, class of 1936), African American pacifist and Pan-African activist
- William Hazlett Upson (1891-1975, class of 1909), author best known stories featuring Alexander Botts, a salesman for the Earthworm Tractor Company
- Dick Zimmer (born 1944), former member of the United States House of Representatives who was a candidate for United States Senate in 1996 and 2008
