= Earthworm Tractors =

1936 film by Ray Enright

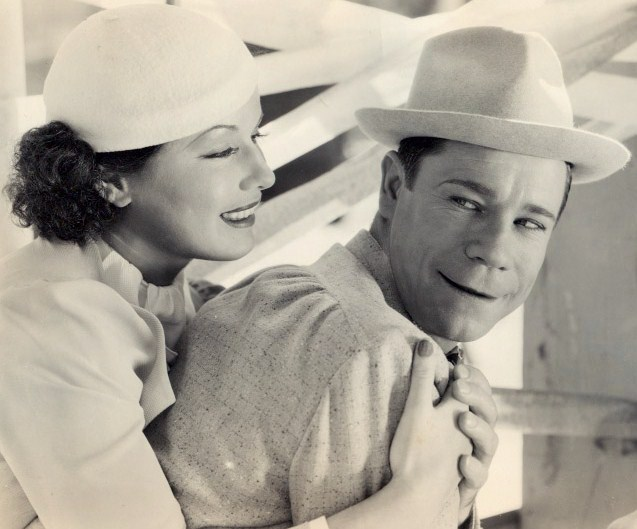
- Film still with June Travis and Joe E. Brown
- Directed by: Ray Enright
- Screenplay by: Hugh Cummings; Richard Macaulay; Paul Gerard Smith; Joe Traub; Peter Milne
- Based on: short stories in The Saturday Evening Post by William Hazlett Upson
- Produced by: Samuel Bischoff (producer); Hal B. Wallis (executive producer)
- Starring: Joe E. Brown; June Travis; Guy Kibbee
- Cinematography: Arthur L. Todd
- Edited by: Doug Gould
- Music by: Leo F. Forbstein
- Production company: Warner Bros. Pictures
- Distributed by: Warner Bros. Pictures
- Release date: July 24, 1936
- Running time: 69 minutes
- Country: United States
- Language: English

Earthworm Tractors is a 1936 American comedy film directed by Ray Enright and starring Joe E. Brown, June Travis and Guy Kibbee. The film is also known as A Natural Born Salesman in the United Kingdom.

The film is based on characters created by William Hazlett Upson in a series of stories that appeared in The Saturday Evening Post. The series featured Alexander Botts, an eternally optimistic self-proclaimed "natural-born salesman", and the Earthworm Tractor Company, and was inspired in part by Upson's actual work experience with the Caterpillar Tractor Company.

== Plot ==
Alexander Botts is a bumbling, but perpetually optimistic "natural-born salesman". He is egged on by his sweetheart Sally to do great things, so he writes a letter to the Earthworm Tractor Company, and is hired as a salesman despite the fact that he knows nothing about tractors. He gets fired more than once for all the destruction he causes, but is rehired by getting orders. After Sally abandons him as a failure and marries another man, he falls in love with Mabel, daughter of the cranky and partially deaf Sam, the owner of a lumberyard who believes he does not need tractors to clear paths for his lumbermen. Botts continues to enrage Sam via various antics such as moving Sam's house with Sam in it without telling him in advance and in the process destroying most of Sam's furniture. Eventually, he proves a super salesman by selling many tractors to Sam after he cures him of his deafness, and wins Mabel's love.

== Cast ==
- Joe E. Brown as Alexander Botts
- June Travis as Mabel Johnson
- Guy Kibbee as Sam Johnson
- Dick Foran as Emmet McManus
- Carol Hughes as Sally Blair
- Gene Lockhart as George Healey
- Olin Howland as Mr. Blair
- Joseph Crehan as Mr. Henderson
- Charles C. Wilson as H.J. Russell
- William B. Davidson as Mr. Jackson
- Irving Bacon as Taxicab Driver
- Stuart Holmes as The Doctor
- Frederick Schmitt as tractor driving stunt double for Joe E. Brown

== Release ==
The film's premiere, attended by Brown, was held at the Madison Theatre in Peoria, Illinois, where Caterpillar had their headquarters.

== Copyright status ==
The failure of the original copyright holder to renew the film's copyright resulted in it falling into public domain, meaning that virtually anyone could duplicate and sell copies of the film. Many of the versions of this film available are badly edited and of extremely poor quality, having been duped from second- or third-generation copies.
