= William Hazlett Upson =

American author (1891–1975)

- Born: September 6, 1891; Glen Ridge, New Jersey, U.S.
- Died: February 5, 1975 (aged 83)
- Education: Glen Ridge High School; Cornell University
- Occupation: Author
- Spouse: Marjorie Alexander Wright (m. 1923)
- Children: 2
- Parent(s): William Ford Upson; Grace Hazlett

William Hazlett Upson (September 6, 1891 – February 5, 1975) was an American author, best remembered for a series of stories featuring Alexander Botts, a salesman for the Earthworm Tractor Company.

== Early life ==
Born at Glen Ridge, New Jersey on September 6, 1891, Upson was the son of William Ford Upson (1857–1930) and Grace (Hazlett) Upson (1861–1911); his older brother was the aeronautics engineer Ralph Hazlett Upson. He graduated from Glen Ridge High School in 1909. Upson attended Cornell University, graduating in 1914. He worked for a short time as a farmer and then served in the United States Army during World War I, after which he was employed as a traveling tractor mechanic by the Caterpillar Tractor Company.

== Literary career ==
Initially drawing inspiration from his actual work experiences, Upson began writing short stories involving "Earthworm tractors," the first of which was published in Collier's magazine in 1923 but most of which appeared in The Saturday Evening Post. Beginning in 1927, the series focused on the work of Alexander Botts, a salesman for the Earthworm Tractor Company.

In 1936, the series was adapted into the film Earthworm Tractors, starring Joe E. Brown. It was also adapted into a short-lived comic strip and several radio shows.

Upson also write two non-fiction books and several plays.

== Personal life and civic affairs ==
Upson married Marjorie Alexander Wright in 1923. They had two children and resided in Vermont from 1928 until his death.

Upson was active in civic affairs, particularly in the Middlebury, Vermont area. He supported bringing access to birth control to Vermont, and was the founder and president of the Middlebury Maternal Health Council, described as "the first community clearing house for birth control information in the state." He attended several Bread Loaf Summer Writer's Conferences and occasionally taught creative writing at Middlebury College. He was a delegate to the Republican National Convention in 1956.

Upson died in 1975. His personal and literary papers were donated to the University of Vermont and are available for research.

== Selected bibliography ==
=== Alexander Botts story collections ===
- Alexander Botts, Earthworm Tractors (1929)
- Earthworms in Europe: Alexander Botts Makes the Old World Tractor-Conscious (1931)
- Keep 'em Crawling: Earthworms at War (1943)
- Botts in War, Botts in Peace: Earthworms Can Take Anything (1944)
- Earthworms Through the Ages: The Wisdom of Alexander Botts (1947)
- Hello, Mr. Henderson (1949)
- No Rest for Botts: Earthworms Make the World Go 'Round (1951)
- The Best of Botts (1961)
- Original Letters of Alexander Botts (1963)
- Alexander Botts: Great Stories from the Saturday Evening Post (1977)
- The Fabulous Saga of Alexander Botts and the Earthworm Tractor (1981)
- Alexander Botts Rides Again: More Mayhem on the Earthworm Tractor! (2005)

=== Other works ===
- The Piano Movers (1927)
- Me and Henry and the Artillery (1928)
- How To Be Rich, Like Me (1947)
