= Glen Ridge, New Jersey =

Borough in Essex County, New Jersey, US

- Borough
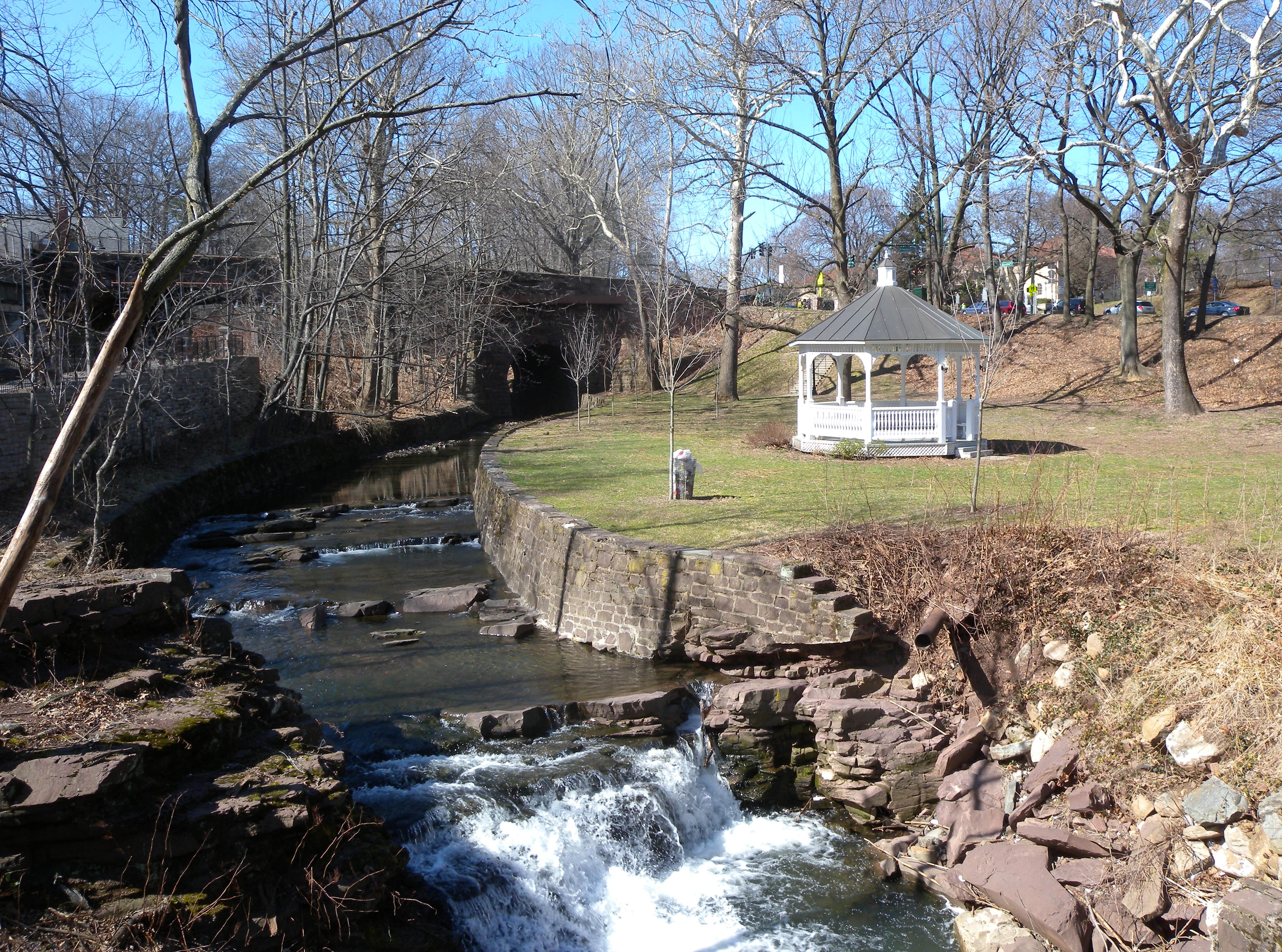
- Toney's Brook flowing through The Glen in Glen Ridge

- Seal

- Location of Glen Ridge in Essex County highlighted in red (right). Inset map: Location of Essex County in New Jersey highlighted in orange (left).

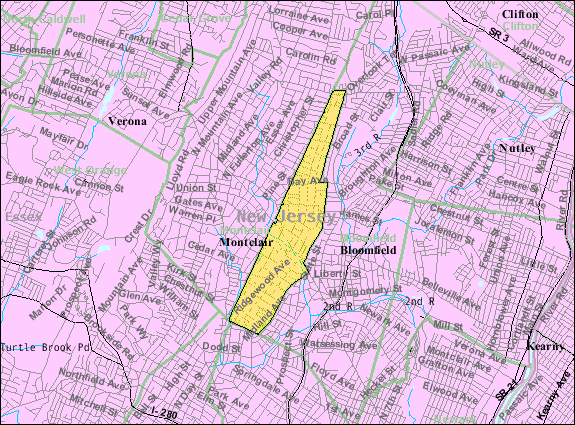
- Census Bureau map of Glen Ridge, New Jersey

- Location in Essex County Location in New Jersey Location in the United States
- Coordinates: 40.804798°N 74.204569°W
- Country: United States
- State: New Jersey
- County: Essex
- Incorporated: February 13, 1895

Government
  - Type: Borough
  - Body: Borough Council
  - Mayor: Deborah Mans (I, term ends December 31, 2027)
  - Administrator: Michael P. Zichelli
  - Municipal clerk: Tara Ventola

Area
  - Total: 1.28 sq mi (3.31 km^{2})
  - Land: 1.27 sq mi (3.30 km^{2})
  - Water: 0.0039 sq mi (0.01 km^{2}) 0.39%
  - Rank: 475th of 565 in state 21st of 22 in county
- Elevation: 197 ft (60 m)

Population (2020)
  - Total: 7,802
  - Estimate (2024): 8,204
  - Rank: 298th of 565 in state 19th of 22 in county
  - Density: 6,119.2/sq mi (2,362.6/km^{2})
  - Rank: 87th of 565 in state 12th of 22 in county
- Time zone: UTC−05:00 (Eastern (EST))
  - Summer (DST): UTC−04:00 (Eastern (EDT))
- ZIP Code: 07028
- Area code: 973
- FIPS code: 3401326610
- GNIS feature ID: 2390559
- Website: www.glenridgenj.org

Glen Ridge is a borough in Essex County, in the U.S. state of New Jersey. As of the 2020 United States census, the borough's population was 7,802, an increase of 275 (+3.7%) from the 2010 census count of 7,527, which in turn reflected an increase of 256 (+3.5%) from the 7,271 counted in the 2000 census. The borough is one of a few in New Jersey preserving the use of gas lamps for street lighting.

== History ==
In 1666, 64 Connecticut families led by Robert Treat bought land from the Lenni Lenape Native Americans and named it New Ark to reflect a covenant to worship freely without persecution. The territory included the future municipalities of Bloomfield, Montclair, Belleville and Nutley. When Bloomfield was established in 1812, Glen Ridge was a section "on the hill" composed mostly of farms and woodlands with the exception of a thriving industrial area along Toney's Brook in the glen. For most of the nineteenth century, three water-powered mills produced lumber, calico, pasteboard boxes and brass fittings. A copper mine and a sandstone quarry were located on the north side of the brook.

In 1856, the Newark and Bloomfield Railroad arrived. The train stopped at Moffett's Mill in Glen Ridge on a daily basis. In 1860, N&B Railroad constructed a platform at Prospect Street known as Ridgewood Station, and its trains made regular stops there. In 1872, the New York and Greenwood Lake Railway began operating with one track and a station at Ridgewood Avenue. A new Ridgewood Station was built in 1887.

In 1891, Mountainside Hospital, a local hospital with more than 300 beds now known as HackensackUMC Mountainside, was founded. The Glen Ridge Country Club was founded in 1894, making it one of the state's oldest clubs.

Residents "on the hill" became unhappy with their representation on the Bloomfield township council. In spite of repeated requests to Bloomfield officials, roads remained unpaved, water and sewer systems were nonexistent and schools were miles away. Area residents marked out the boundaries of a 1.45-square-mile (3.8 km^{2}) area to secede from Bloomfield. At the election held on February 12, 1895, the decision to secede passed by 23 votes. Robert Rudd was elected the first mayor of Glen Ridge.

On February 13, 1895, Glen Ridge was incorporated as a borough by an act of the New Jersey Legislature from portions of Bloomfield Township, based on the results of a referendum held the previous day.

After Glen Ridge became a borough, architects suggested installing gas lamps as streetlights. Gas lamps became a characteristic of the borough. Circa World War II, gas lamps were discarded (many by the City of New York), salvaged, repaired, and brought to Glen Ridge. The Gaslamp is the Glen Ridge Historical Society's quarterly newsletter. Along streets with gas lamps, utility poles for electric lines are not permitted, and are instead routed behind homes. The borough also features extensive use of slate sidewalks.

In 1924, Glen Ridge became the first municipality in New Jersey to establish a zoning ordinance.

In 1982, the borough's official name was changed to "Township of Glen Ridge Borough". Glen Ridge was one of more than a dozen Essex County municipalities to reclassify themselves as townships to take advantage of federal revenue sharing policies that allocated townships a greater share of government aid on a per capita basis. Effective May 1993, the borough's original name of "Glen Ridge Borough" was restored.

In the 1980s, it was discovered that a section of the borough near Carteret Park was built on top of hazardous waste. Waste contaminated with radium from the old U.S. Radium watch dial plant had been used to fill in low-lying areas of Glen Ridge covering 90 acres (36 ha), as well as portions of Montclair and West Orange.

In 1989, athletes from Glen Ridge High School were involved in the sexual assault of a mentally handicapped student. Three teenagers were found guilty of first-degree aggravated sexual assault; a fourth was convicted of third-degree conspiracy. Author Bernard Lefkowitz wrote about the incident in the 1997 book Our Guys: The Glen Ridge Rape and the Secret Life of the Perfect Suburb. Lefkowitz's book was adapted into the 1999 TV movie Our Guys: Outrage at Glen Ridge.

Glen Ridge is a frequent location for film, television, and commercial shoots. Notable works filmed in Glen Ridge include Mona Lisa Smile (2003) and Winter Solstice (2004).

In 2010, Glen Ridge was ranked as the 38th Best Place to live by New Jersey Monthly magazine.

== Geography ==
According to the United States Census Bureau, the borough had a total area of 1.28 square miles (3.31 km^{2}), including 1.28 square miles (3.30 km^{2}) of land and 0.01 square miles (0.01 km^{2}) of water (0.39%). It is bounded by Bloomfield to its east, Montclair to its west, East Orange to its south, and shares a short border with Orange to its southwest. The borough's US mail ZIP code is 07028.

Glen Ridge is located on a ridge on the east side of the First Mountain of the Watchung Mountains. The borough stretches 2 miles (3.2 km) from north to south and a maximum of six blocks wide from east to west, and it is only three or two blocks wide in "the Panhandle" north of Bay Avenue.

=== Climate ===
Glen Ridge has a temperate climate, with warm / hot humid summers and cool / cold winters, according to the Köppen climate classification humid subtropical climate. The borough gets an average of 49 inches (1,200 mm) of rain per year and 20 inches (510 mm) of snowfall, compared to the US averages of 37 inches (940 mm) and 25 inches (640 mm) inches. Glen Ridge has 124 days of measurable precipitation a year. During the winter, it is highly recommended to wear warm clothing because it can get very cold, while the summers can get extremely hot and humid. The majority of February and a bit of March is when there are the most snowfall. Due to the borough's elevation and the topography of its river banks, it is not prone to significant flooding.

There are typically about 205 sunny days per year in Glen Ridge. The temperature ranges from a high around 86 degrees in July and a low around 21 degrees in January. The comfort index for the borough is 47 out of 100, compared to a national average of 44 (with higher numbers being more comfortable).

== Demographics ==
Historical population
Census	Pop.	Note	%±
1900	1,960		—
1910	3,260		66.3%
1920	4,620		41.7%
1930	7,365		59.4%
1940	7,331		−0.5%
1950	7,620		3.9%
1960	8,322		9.2%
1970	8,518		2.4%
1980	7,855		−7.8%
1990	7,076		−9.9%
2000	7,271		2.8%
2010	7,527		3.5%
2020	7,802		3.7%
2024 (est.)	8,204	▲	5.2%
Population sources: 1900–1920; 1900–1910 1910–1930; 1940–2000 2000; 2010 2020

=== 2020 census ===
As of the 2020 census, Glen Ridge had a population of 7,802. The median age was 40.2 years. 30.3% of residents were under the age of 18 and 11.6% of residents were 65 years of age or older. For every 100 females there were 94.1 males, and for every 100 females age 18 and over there were 90.4 males age 18 and over.

100.0% of residents lived in urban areas, while 0.0% lived in rural areas.

There were 2,529 households in Glen Ridge, of which 52.3% had children under the age of 18 living in them. Of all households, 72.6% were married-couple households, 7.8% were households with a male householder and no spouse or partner present, and 17.4% were households with a female householder and no spouse or partner present. About 13.3% of all households were made up of individuals and 7.1% had someone living alone who was 65 years of age or older.

There were 2,592 housing units, of which 2.4% were vacant. The homeowner vacancy rate was 0.5% and the rental vacancy rate was 0.0%.

Racial composition as of the 2020 census
Race	Number	Percent
White	5,937	76.1%
Black or African American	303	3.9%
American Indian and Alaska Native	2	0.0%
Asian	592	7.6%
Native Hawaiian and Other Pacific Islander	1	0.0%
Some other race	142	1.8%
Two or more races	825	10.6%
Hispanic or Latino (of any race)	558	7.2%

=== 2010 census ===
The 2010 United States census counted 7,527 people, 2,476 households, and 2,033 families in the borough. The population density was 5,872.8 per square mile (2,267.5/km^{2}). There were 2,541 housing units at an average density of 1,982.6 per square mile (765.5/km^{2}). The racial makeup was 86.21% (6,489) White, 5.04% (379) Black or African American, 0.04% (3) Native American, 4.65% (350) Asian, 0.00% (0) Pacific Islander, 1.37% (103) from other races, and 2.70% (203) from two or more races. Hispanic or Latino of any race were 5.01% (377) of the population.

Of the 2,476 households, 49.9% had children under the age of 18; 70.9% were married couples living together; 9.1% had a female householder with no husband present and 17.9% were non-families. Of all households, 14.9% were made up of individuals and 6.7% had someone living alone who was 65 years of age or older. The average household size was 3.03 and the average family size was 3.39.

32.2% of the population were under the age of 18, 4.7% from 18 to 24, 22.3% from 25 to 44, 31.2% from 45 to 64, and 9.5% who were 65 years of age or older. The median age was 40.2 years. For every 100 females, the population had 95.6 males. For every 100 females ages 18 and older there were 89.0 males.

The Census Bureau's 2006–2010 American Community Survey showed that (in 2010 inflation-adjusted dollars) median household income was $160,511 (with a margin of error of ±$11,073) and the median family income was $173,466 (±$25,554). Males had a median income of $111,968 (±$11,975) versus $85,938 (±$24,626) for females. The per capita income for the borough was $64,222 (±$8,487). About 1.1% of families and 2.8% of the population were below the poverty line, including 1.9% of those under age 18 and none of those age 65 or over.

=== 2000 census ===
As of the 2000 United States census there were 7,271 people, 2,458 households, and 1,978 families residing in the borough. The population density was 5,695.0 inhabitants per square mile (2,198.9/km^{2}). There were 2,490 housing units at an average density of 1,950.3 per square mile (753.0/km^{2}). The racial makeup of the borough was 89.18% White, 4.98% African American, 0.15% Native American, 3.34% Asian, 0.99% from other races, and 1.36% from two or more races. Hispanic or Latino of any race were 3.45% of the population.

There were 2,458 households, out of which 46.3% had children under the age of 18 living with them, 69.9% were married couples living together, 8.1% had a female householder with no husband present, and 19.5% were non-families. 16.7% of all households were made up of individuals, and 8.0% had someone living alone who was 65 years of age or older. The average household size was 2.95 and the average family size was 3.33.

In the borough, the population was spread out, with 30.7% under the age of 18, 4.5% from 18 to 24, 29.5% from 25 to 44, 24.9% from 45 to 64, and 10.4% who were 65 years of age or older. The median age was 38 years. For every 100 females, there were 94.9 males. For every 100 females age 18 and over, there were 89.3 males.

The median income for a household in the borough was $105,638, and the median income for a family was $120,650. Males had a median income of $91,161 versus $51,444 for females. The per capita income for the borough was $48,456. About 1.9% of families and 3.0% of the population were below the poverty line, including 3.3% of those under age 18 and 4.1% of those age 65 or over.

== Government ==
=== Local government ===
Glen Ridge is governed under the borough form of New Jersey municipal government, which is used in 218 municipalities (of the 564) statewide, making it the most common form of government in New Jersey. The governing body is comprised of the mayor and the borough council, with all positions elected at-large on a partisan basis as part of the November general election. The mayor is elected directly by the voters to a four-year term of office. The borough council includes six members elected to serve three-year terms on a staggered basis, with two seats coming up for election each year in a three-year cycle. The borough form of government used by Glen Ridge is a "weak mayor / strong council" government in which council members act as the legislative body with the mayor presiding at meetings and voting only in the event of a tie. The mayor can veto ordinances subject to an override by a two-thirds majority vote of the council. The mayor makes committee and liaison assignments for council members, and most appointments are made by the mayor with the advice and consent of the council.

As of 2025, the mayor of Glen Ridge is Independent Deborah Mans, whose term of office ends December 31, 2027. Members of the borough council are Peter A. Hughes (I, 2025), Richard P. Law (I, 2025), David Lefkovits (I, 2026), Rebecca Meyer (I, 2027), LoriJean Moody (I, 2026) and Steve Zimet (I, 2027).

In January 2016, the borough council chose former mayor Peter Hughes to fill the council seat expiring in December 2016 that was vacated by Stuart K. Patrick, who resigned from the council to take his seat as mayor.

Murphy was selected by the borough council in November 2013 to serve the unexpired term of Elizabeth K. Baker. Ann Marie Morrow was elected in November 2014 to fill a one-year unexpired term.

The Glen Ridge Civic Conference Committee, established in 1913, is made up of delegates from the community and from local civic organizations, provides a non-partisan method of candidate selection for Borough elections. The CCC endorsement is very significant; in most elections, the CCC's candidates are unopposed. The eight organizations currently sending delegates to the CCC are: The Democratic Club, Freeman Gardens Association, Friends of the Glen Ridge Library, The Glen Ridge Historical Society, The Northside Association, The Republican Club, The Golden Circle, The South End Association and the Women's Club of Glen Ridge.

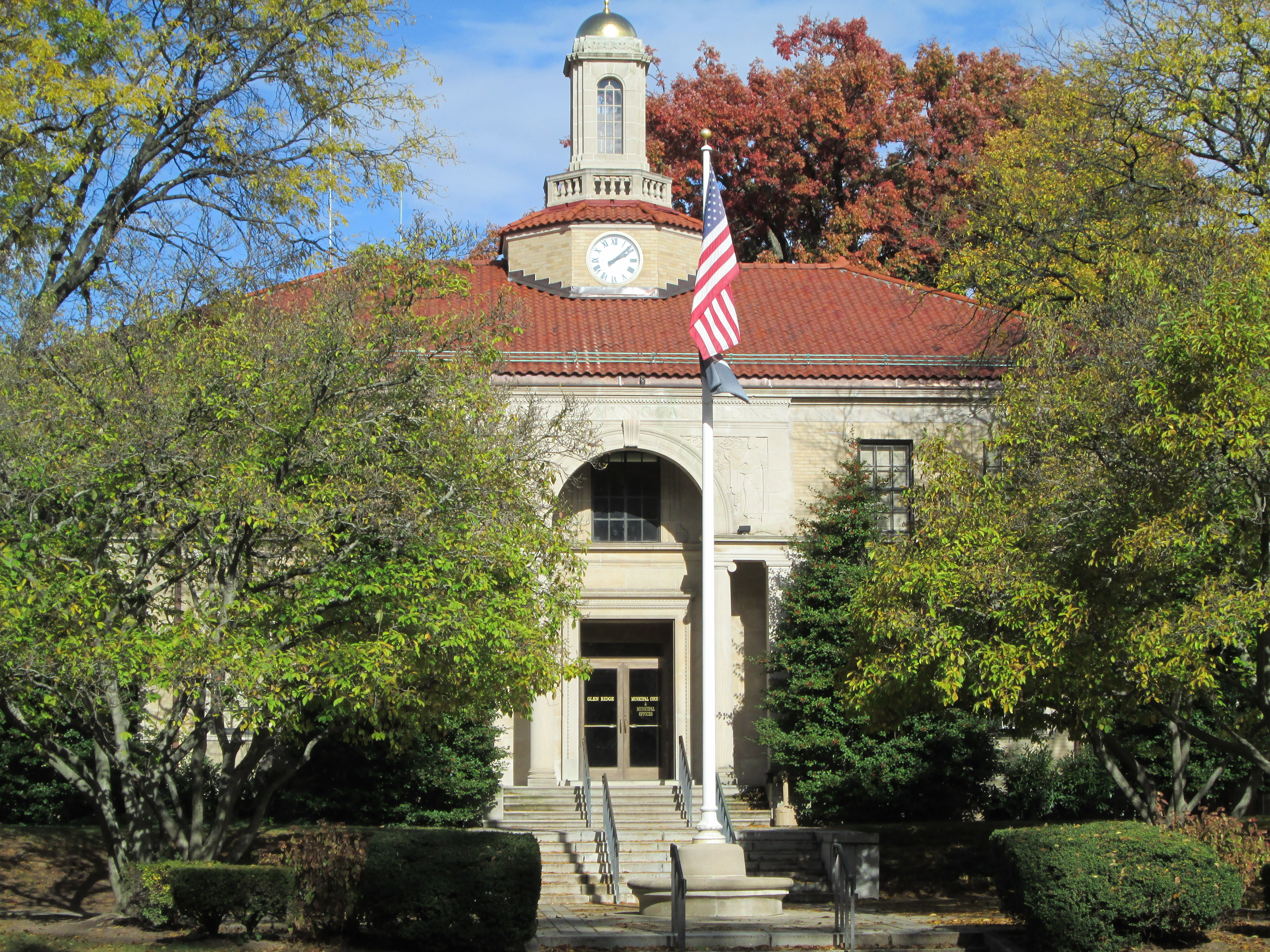
Glen Ridge Borough Hall in autumn

In recent years, the CCC has been weakened both by changing attitudes in the borough, the actions of a number of community residents, and internal conflicts within the CCC itself. Mayor Carl Bergmanson was the first mayor since the establishment of the CCC to be elected without seeking (or receiving) the Committee's endorsement. A member of the council for three terms, he ran for mayor in 1999, losing to the CCC candidate Steven Plate. When Plate was selected as the CCC candidate again in 2003 (contradicting the committee's precedent of one term per mayor), Bergmanson ran again, and won, gaining the majority in all but one of the borough's districts. However, the CCC is still firmly in control of the borough's political structure—all 16 of the elected officials currently serving Glen Ridge were nominated by the CCC. Generally, when non-CCC candidates run, they run as independents. The Democratic and Republican parties are not forces in local elections.

=== Federal, state, and county representation ===
Glen Ridge is located in the 11th Congressional District and is part of New Jersey's 34th state legislative district.

For the 119th United States Congress, New Jersey's 11th congressional district is represented by Analilia Mejia (D, Glen Ridge) who was elected in a 2026 special election to serve for the remainder of the Congress following the resignation Mikie Sherrill (D, Montclair), who was elected Governor of New Jersey in 2025. New Jersey is represented in the United States Senate by Democrats Cory Booker (Newark, term ends 2027) and Andy Kim (Moorestown, term ends 2031).

For the 2026–2027 session, the 34th legislative district of the New Jersey Legislature is represented in the State Senate by Britnee Timberlake (D, East Orange) and in the General Assembly by Carmen Morales (D, Belleville) and Michael Venezia (D, Bloomfield).

Essex County is governed by a directly elected county executive, with legislative functions performed by the Board of County Commissioners. As of 2025, the County Executive is Joseph N. DiVincenzo Jr. (D, Roseland), whose four-year term of office ends December 31, 2026. The county's Board of County Commissioners is composed of nine members, five of whom are elected from districts and four of whom are elected on an at-large basis. They are elected for three-year concurrent terms and may be re-elected to successive terms at the annual election in November. Essex County's Commissioners are:

Robert Mercado (D, District 1 – Newark's North and East Wards, parts of Central and West Wards; Newark, 2026), A'Dorian Murray-Thomas (D, District 2 – Irvington, Maplewood and parts of Newark's South and West Wards; Newark, 2026), Vice President Tyshammie L. Cooper (D, District 3 - Newark: West and Central Wards; East Orange, Orange and South Orange; East Orange, 2026), Leonard M. Luciano (D, District 4 – Caldwell, Cedar Grove, Essex Fells, Fairfield, Livingston, Millburn, North Caldwell, Roseland, Verona, West Caldwell and West Orange; West Caldwell, 2026), President Carlos M. Pomares (D, District 5 – Belleville, Bloomfield, Glen Ridge, Montclair and Nutley; Bloomfield, 2026), Brendan W. Gill (D, at large; Montclair, 2026), Romaine Graham (D, at large; Irvington, 2026), Wayne Richardson (D, at large; Newark, 2026), Patricia Sebold (D, at-large; Livingston, 2026).

Constitutional officers elected countywide are: Clerk Christopher J. Durkin (D, West Caldwell, 2025), Register of Deeds Juan M. Rivera Jr. (D, Newark, 2029), Sheriff Amir Jones (D, Newark, 2027), and Surrogate Alturrick Kenney (D, Newark, 2028).

=== Politics ===
As of March 2011, there were a total of 5,169 registered voters in Glen Ridge, of which 2,135 (41.3%) were registered as Democrats, 993 (19.2%) were registered as Republicans and 2,037 (39.4%) were registered as Unaffiliated. There were 4 voters registered as Libertarians or Greens.

United States presidential election results for Glen Ridge
Year	Republican		Democratic		Third party(ies)	
Year	No.	%	No.	%	No.	%
2024	916	20.23%	3,543	78.26%	68	1.50%
2020	943	20.05%	3,689	78.42%	72	1.53%
2016	977	23.50%	3,030	72.87%	151	3.63%
2012	1,396	36.21%	2,415	62.65%	44	1.14%
2008	1,444	35.57%	2,583	63.62%	33	0.81%
2004	1,608	39.96%	2,381	59.17%	35	0.87%

In the 2012 presidential election, Democrat Barack Obama received 62.6% of the vote (2,415 cast), ahead of Republican Mitt Romney with 36.2% (1,396 votes), and other candidates with 1.1% (44 votes), among the 3,871 ballots cast by the borough's 5,380 registered voters (16 ballots were spoiled), for a turnout of 72.0%. In the 2008 presidential election, Democrat Barack Obama received 62.9% of the vote (2,583 cast), ahead of Republican John McCain with 35.2% (1,444 votes) and other candidates with 0.8% (33 votes), among the 4,104 ballots cast by the borough's 5,185 registered voters, for a turnout of 79.2%. In the 2004 presidential election, Democrat John Kerry received 59.1% of the vote (2,381 ballots cast), outpolling Republican George W. Bush with 39.9% (1,608 votes) and other candidates with 0.7% (35 votes), among the 4,031 ballots cast by the borough's 4,967 registered voters, for a turnout percentage of 81.2.

Gubernatorial election results for Glen Ridge
Year	Republican		Democratic		Third party(ies)	
Year	No.	%	No.	%	No.	%
2025	829	21.45%	3,022	78.19%	14	0.36%
2021	707	24.37%	2,174	74.94%	20	0.69%
2017	572	22.48%	1,888	74.21%	84	3.30%
2013	1,450	53.23%	1,240	45.52%	34	1.25%
2009	1,071	39.53%	1,388	51.24%	250	9.23%
2005	1,081	39.70%	1,588	58.32%	54	1.98%

In the 2013 gubernatorial election, Republican Chris Christie received 53.2% of the vote (1,450 cast), ahead of Democrat Barbara Buono with 45.5% (1,240 votes), and other candidates with 1.2% (34 votes), among the 2,772 ballots cast by the borough's 5,429 registered voters (48 ballots were spoiled), for a turnout of 51.1%. In the 2009 gubernatorial election, Democrat Jon Corzine received 51.0% of the vote (1,388 ballots cast), ahead of Republican Chris Christie with 39.3% (1,071 votes), Independent Chris Daggett with 8.5% (231 votes) and other candidates with 0.7% (19 votes), among the 2,722 ballots cast by the borough's 5,144 registered voters, yielding a 52.9% turnout.

United States Senate election results for Glen Ridge1
Year	Republican		Democratic		Third party(ies)	
Year	No.	%	No.	%	No.	%
2024	970	21.63%	3,432	76.54%	82	1.83%
2018	931	27.46%	2,368	69.85%	91	2.68%
2012	1,153	33.70%	2,175	63.58%	93	2.72%
2006	1,080	37.87%	1,729	60.62%	43	1.51%

United States Senate election results for Glen Ridge2
Year	Republican		Democratic		Third party(ies)	
Year	No.	%	No.	%	No.	%
2020	1,081	23.26%	3,521	75.75%	46	0.99%
2014	721	30.81%	1,579	67.48%	40	1.71%
2013	532	30.23%	1,214	68.98%	14	0.80%
2008	1,440	38.95%	2,197	59.43%	60	1.62%

== Education ==
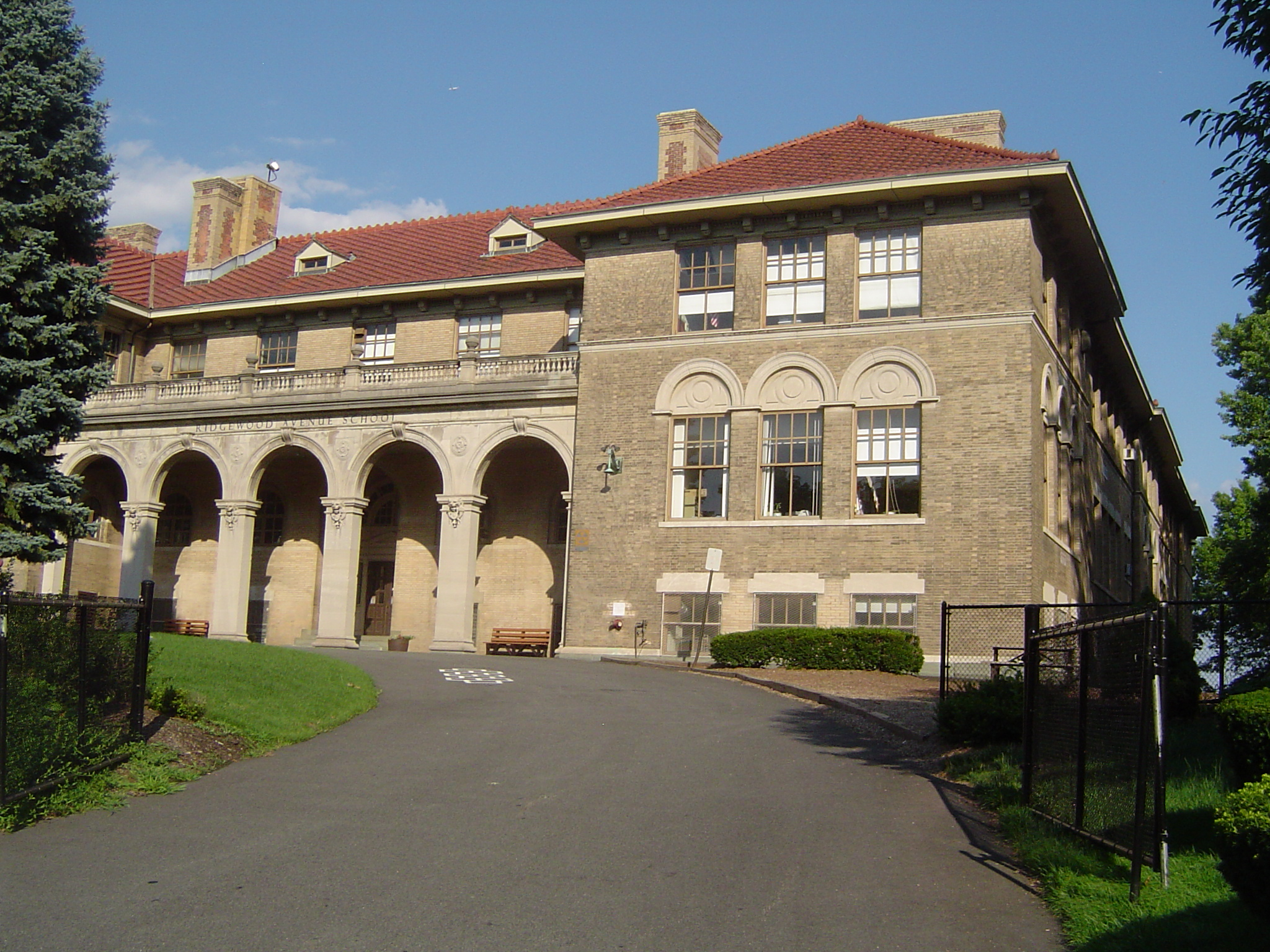
Ridgewood Avenue school

The Glen Ridge Public Schools serve students in pre-kindergarten through twelfth grade. As of the 2023–24 school year, the district, comprised of five schools, had an enrollment of 1,810 students and 147.8 classroom teachers (on an FTE basis), for a student–teacher ratio of 12.3:1. Schools in the district (with 2023–24 enrollment data from the National Center for Education Statistics) are Central School with 136 students in grades PreK–2, Forest Avenue School with 145 students in grades PreK–2, Linden Avenue School with 158 students in grades PreK–2, Ridgewood Avenue School with 539 students in grades 3–6 and Glen Ridge High School with 811 students in grades 7–12.

The high school was the 12th-ranked public high school in New Jersey out of 328 schools statewide in New Jersey Monthly magazine's September 2012 cover story on the state's "Top Public High Schools", after being ranked 4th in 2010 out of 322 schools listed.

== Housing ==
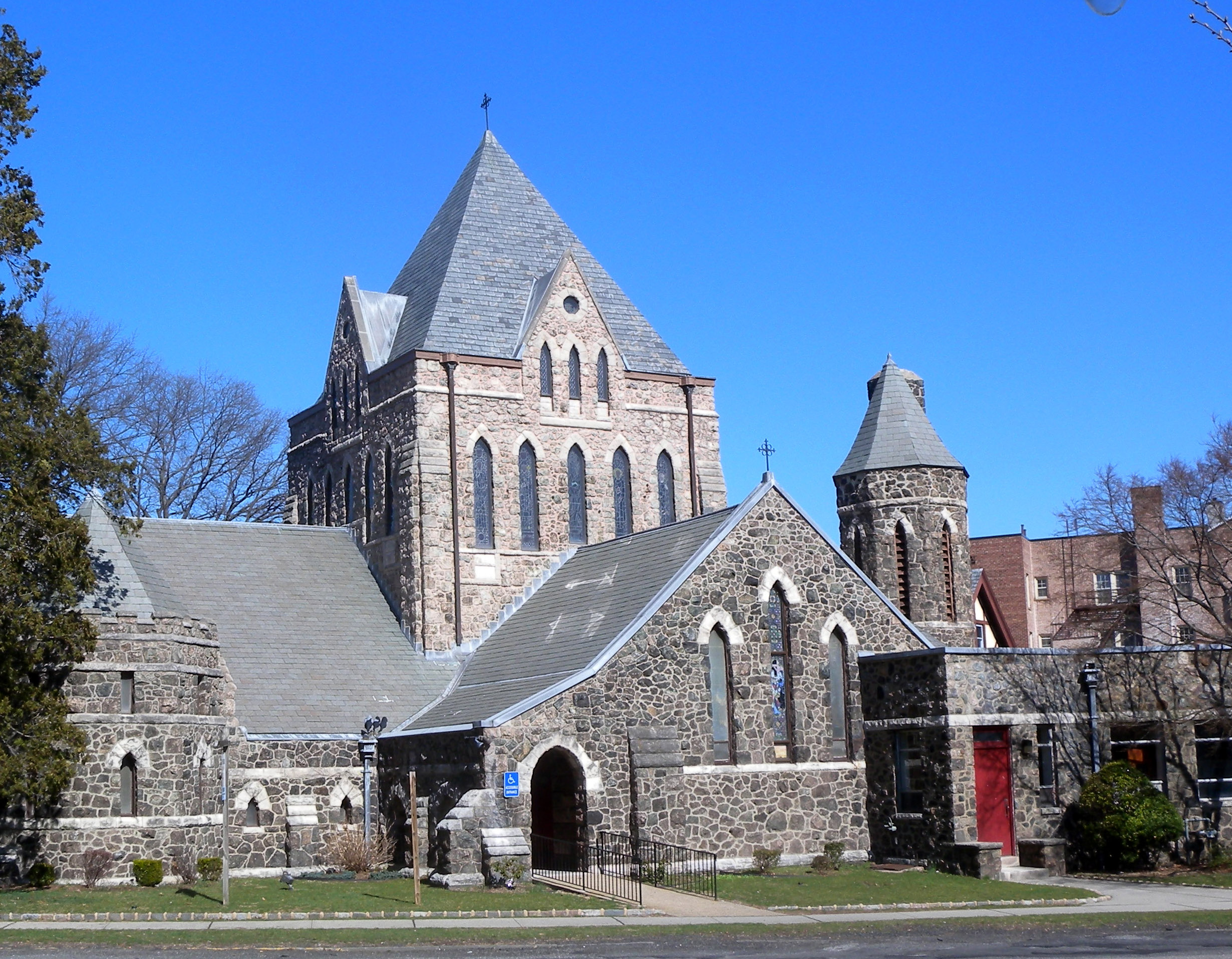
Christ Church Episcopal

The median price for a house in Glen Ridge in 2014 was $580,000, which is double the national average. Out of the 2,549 houses in the borough, 84.7% of them were single units (detached) and had a median of 7.7 rooms. Glen Ridge is known for its old-town charm, with 72.8% of its houses having been built before 1939. In 1895, when the borough was chartered, Glen Ridge became one of the first communities to hire a planner, which resulted in many late Victorian and Edwardian elements. The condition of the borough has been maintained due to the building codes that were established, the creation of the Building Department which included a Building Inspector, and a zoning ordinance (the first in the state of New Jersey). Although the majority of Glen Ridge consists of houses, many residents live in apartment complexes. One apartment complex is behind the Glen Ridge Community Pool, while the other apartment complex is not far from that.

The architecture of the borough includes houses representing every major style from the mid-nineteenth century onward. Some of the architecture styles include the Carpenter Gothic, the Medieval, the High Victorian Period, the Queen Anne Cottage, American Georgian, Shingle Style, and the Prairie Home Style. Notable architects that have left their legacy in Glen Ridge include Frank Lloyd Wright, Stanford White, and John Russell Pope. To maintain the historical feel of the borough and protect the architectural features, a Historic Preservation Commission was created to review construction on houses in the historic district. Many homes are included in the Glen Ridge Historic District, which was listed on the National Register of Historic Places (NRHP) in 1982 and later expanded in two boundary increases. It includes the Glen Ridge and the Benson Street train stations.

== Transportation ==
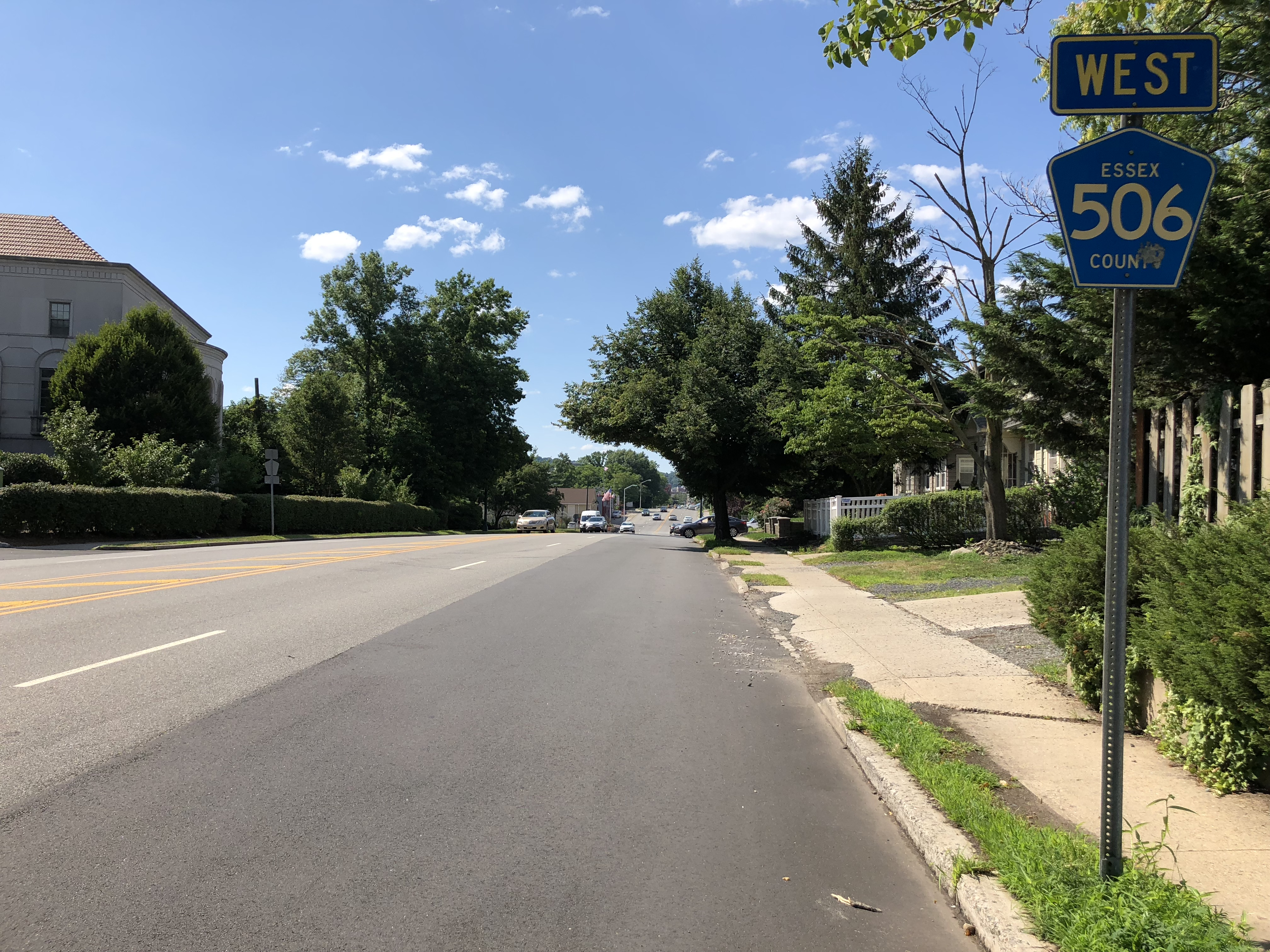
View west along County Route 506 in Glen Ridge

=== Roads and highways ===
As of May 2010, the borough had a total of 23.29 miles (37.48 km) of roadways, of which 18.19 miles (29.27 km) were maintained by the municipality and 5.10 miles (8.21 km) by Essex County.

The primary roads directly serving Glen Ridge include County Route 506 (Bloomfield Avenue) and County Route 509. Major highways near the borough include the New Jersey Turnpike, Interstate 80, Interstate 280, the Garden State Parkway, U.S. Route 46, Route 3 and Route 21.

=== Public transportation ===
Glen Ridge is a little over 2-mile (3.2 km) long, north to south, via Ridgewood Avenue, making it accessible for residents by walking or biking.

NJ Transit provides bus service to Newark on the 11, 28 and 29 via Bloomfield Avenue.

Commuter rail service is available at the Glen Ridge station, which was formerly named Ridgewood Avenue station. NJ Transit provides service to New York Penn Station in Midtown Manhattan and to Hoboken Terminal via the Montclair-Boonton Line. There are many other train stations near Glen Ridge.

The borough has a jitney service which provides transportation to and from the Glen Ridge Station for commuters. This service has a fee and is only available between certain hours in the day. The Freeman Parkway Bridge, constructed in 1926, is a deck arch bridge that crosses over Toney's Brook and the Montclair-Boonton Line.

== Notable people ==
People who were born in, residents of, or otherwise closely associated with Glen Ridge include:

- Buzz Aldrin (born 1930), Apollo 11 astronaut who was the second person to walk on the Moon
- Kurt Allerman (born 1955), former football linebacker who played nine seasons in the NFL for the St. Louis Cardinals Green Bay Packers and Detroit Lions
- Peter Anderson (born 1963), former American football center who was a consensus All-American while playing for the Georgia Bulldogs in 1985
- Horace Ashenfelter (1923–2018), 1952 Olympic gold medalist in track and field
- Louis E. Baltzley (born 1885), inventor of the binder clip
- Dale Berra (born 1956), former Major League Baseball player and son of Yogi Berra
- Charles W. Billings (1866–1928), politician and competitive shooter who was a member of the 1912 Summer Olympics American trapshooting team that won the gold medal in team clay pigeons
- Kerry Bishé (born 1984), movie and television actress who appeared in Argo and Scrubs
- Regina Bogat (born 1928), abstract artist
- Eddie Bracken (1915–2002), character actor
- Scott Bradley (born 1960), former MLB catcher
- Jon Brion (born 1963), singer, songwriter, composer and record producer
- Bob Butler (1891–1959), football player for the Wisconsin Badgers who was inducted into the College Football Hall of Fame
- Mark Bryant (born 1965), retired professional basketball player who played for 10 NBA teams during his career
- Salvador "Tutti" Camarata (1913–2005), composer, arranger, trumpeter and record producer
- Bill Casselman (born 1941), mathematician who works in group theory
- Kacy Catanzaro (born 1990), first woman to complete the qualifying course of American Ninja Warrior
- Mary Jo Codey (born 1955), former First Lady of New Jersey
- Declan Cronin (born 1997), pitcher for the Chicago White Sox and Miami Marlins
- Tom Cruise (born 1962), movie star, spent several years of his childhood in Glen Ridge, and graduated from Glen Ridge High School
- Gary Cuozzo (born 1941), former quarterback who played in 10 NFL seasons from 1963 to 1972 for four teams
- David Demarest (born 1951), Vice President for Public Affairs, Stanford University and a former Republican operative who worked for Presidents Ronald Reagan and George H. W. Bush
- Marion Elza Dodd (1883–1961), bookseller, author, librarian and professor
- Michael J. Doherty (born 1963), Surrogate of Warren County, New Jersey, who served in the New Jersey Senate from 2009 to 2022
- R. Bruce Dold (1955–2025), Pulitzer Prize–winning journalist and the publisher and editor-in-chief of the Chicago Tribune
- Joe Dubuque (born 1982), amateur wrestler and wrestling coach
- Lauren English (born 1989), competitive swimmer who set the United States Open Record in the 50 Meter Backstroke
- John Fairchild (1927–2015), publisher and editor in chief of Women's Wear Daily from 1960 to 1996
- Cora Farrell (born 1999), curler who was a silver medalist at the 2016 Winter Youth Olympics
- Anthony Fasano (born 1984), NFL tight end for the Miami Dolphins
- Tom Fleming (1951–2017), distance runner who won the 1973 and 1975 New York City Marathon
- Buddy Fortunato (born 1946), newspaper publisher and politician who served four terms in the New Jersey General Assembly
- Clayton Freeman (1872–1959), businessman and politician who served as chairman of the New Jersey Republican State Committee
- Kenny Garrett (born 1960), Grammy Award-winning jazz musician, saxophonist and composer
- Nia Gill (born 1948), represents the 34th Legislative District in the New Jersey Senate since 2002
- Sean Gleeson (born 1986), offensive coordinator and quarterbacks coach for the Rutgers Scarlet Knights football team
- Jennifer Granick (born 1969), attorney and educator who focuses on intellectual property law, free speech, privacy law, and other things relating to computer security
- Roger Lee Hall (born 1942), composer and musicologist
- Sharon Hay-Webster (born 1961), politician who served in the House of Representatives of the Parliament of Jamaica from 1997 to 2012
- George Helmy (born 1972), politician who was appointed to serve as United States senator from New Jersey from August to December 2024
- David Henesy (born 1955/56), former child actor best known for appearing in the ABC soap opera Dark Shadows
- Clemens Herschel (1842–1930), hydraulic engineer
- George P. Jenkins (1915–2009), business executive who served as chairman of the Metropolitan Life Insurance Company
- Alfred Jensen (1903–1981), abstract painter
- Hattie Meyers Junkin (1896–1990), pioneer female aviator who was the first woman to earn a glider class C license
- Ezra Koenig (born 1984), musician Vampire Weekend
- Alexander Kolowrat (1886–1927), pioneer of Austrian Cinema
- Frederick Bernard Lacey (1920–2017), United States district judge of the United States District Court for the District of New Jersey
- Rodney Leinhardt (born 1970), professional wrestler, better known as Rodney from his appearances with the World Wrestling Federation
- Aubrey Lewis (1935–2001), football and track star with the Notre Dame Fighting Irish who was recognized by The Star-Ledger as its Football Player of the Century
- Barbara Love (1937–2022), feminist writer and the editor of Feminists who Changed America, 1963–1975
- Rudy Mancuso (born 1992), actor, producer, internet personality, comedian and musician best known for his comedic videos on YouTube
- Katherine MacLean (1925–2019), science fiction author best known for her short fiction of the 1950s which examined the impact of technological advances on individuals and society
- Hugh McCracken (1942–2013), rock guitarist and session musician
- John B. MacChesney (1929–2021), scientist who was a Bell Labs pioneer in optical communication
- Analilia Mejia (born 1977), activist and politician, who is the U.S. Representative for New Jersey's 11th congressional district
- Wes Miles (born 1984), musician Ra Ra Riot
- Edward Page Mitchell (1852–1927), editor-in-chief of The New York Sun
- George Musser (born 1965), book author and contributing editor of Scientific American magazine
- William J. Nardini (born 1979), Assistant United States Attorney for the District of Connecticut and nominee to be a United States circuit judge of the United States Court of Appeals for the Second Circuit
- Gerry Niewood (1943–2009) jazz saxophonist
- Joe Orsulak (born 1962), Major League Baseball player from 1983 to 1997
- George S. Parlin (born 1901-1978), former U.S. Securities and Exchange lawyer and United States Army colonel
- Robert A. Pascal (1934–2021), politician who served as County executive of Anne Arundel County, Maryland, from 1975 to 1982
- Barbara Rachelson, politician who has served in the Vermont House of Representatives since 2014
- Priscilla Roberts (1916–2001), artist known for her still life paintings
- Kathy Mueller Rohan, former professional tennis player
- Henry Selick (born 1952), stop motion director, producer and writer best known for directing both The Nightmare Before Christmas and James and the Giant Peach
- Duncan Sheik (1969–2026), singer-songwriter, composer and actor
- Cindy Sherman (born 1954), artistic photographer
- George Steinmetz (born 1957), exploration photographer, winner of the Picture of the Year award, Overseas Press Club, 25 stories for GEO magazine in Germany
- Alison Stewart (born 1966), MSNBC news personality and host of The Most with Alison Stewart
- George E. Stuart (1935–2014), archaeologist, cartographer and scholar best known for his contributions to Mesoamerican and Maya archaeology
- Bill Sutherland (1918–2010), African American pacifist and Pan-African activist
- Steve Thomas (born 1963), former NHL right winger who played for the New Jersey Devils from 1995 to 1998
- Stephen S. Trott (born 1939), judge for the United States Court of Appeals for the Ninth Circuit
- William Hazlett Upson (1891–1975), author best known stories featuring Alexander Botts, a salesman for the Earthworm Tractor Company
- Jean Van Leeuwen (1937–2025), children's book author, of over forty children's books, including the Oliver Pig series
- Don Van Natta Jr. (born 1964), investigative reporter at The New York Times
- Tom Verducci (born 1960), sportswriter for Sports Illustrated
- Emma Vigeland (born 1994), political commentator, producer and media host
- Dick Zimmer (born 1944), former member of the United States House of Representatives who was the Republican candidate for United States Senate in 1996 and 2008
