= Ralph Hazlett Upson =

American aviator (1888–1968)

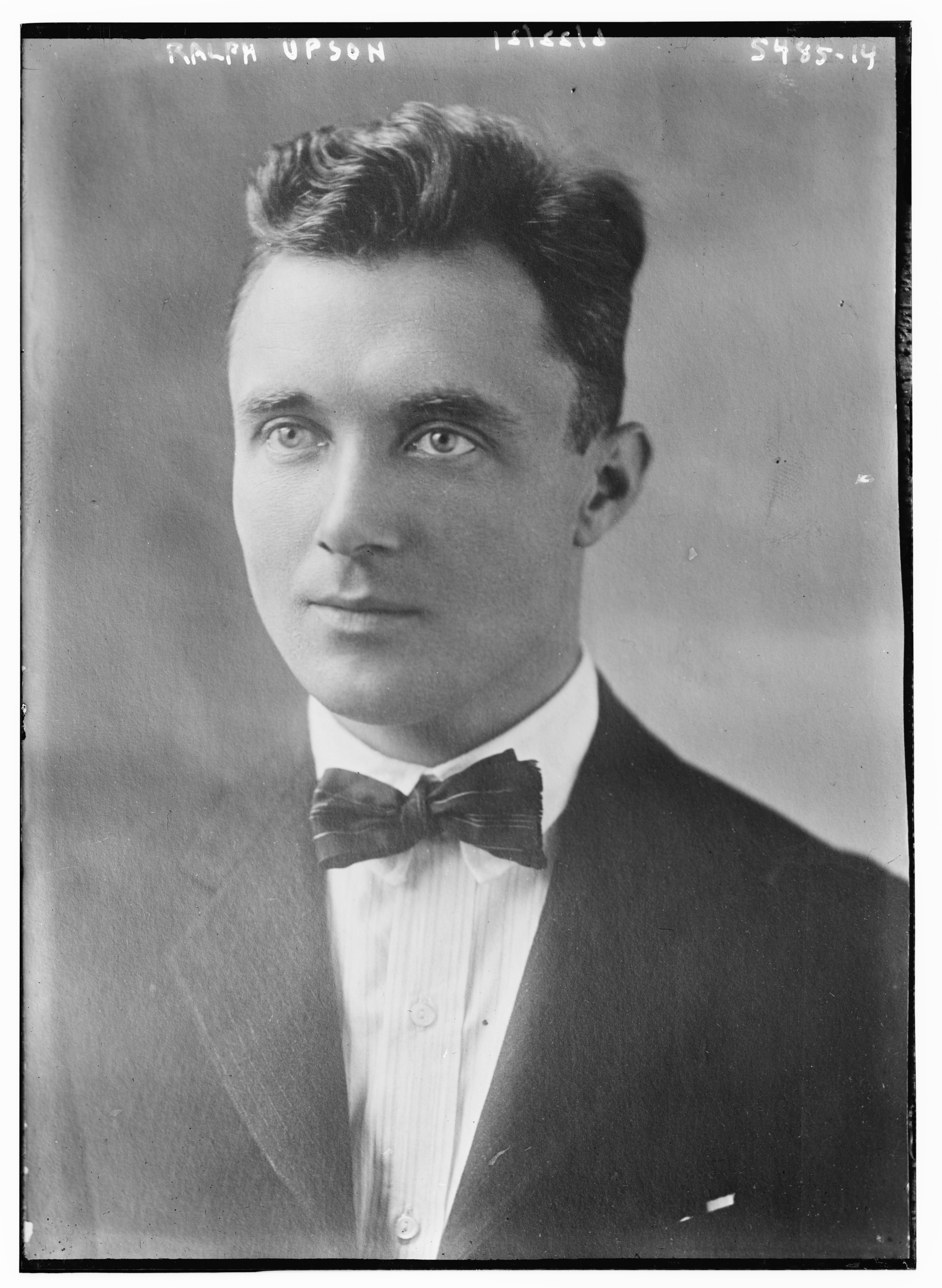
Upson in 1900

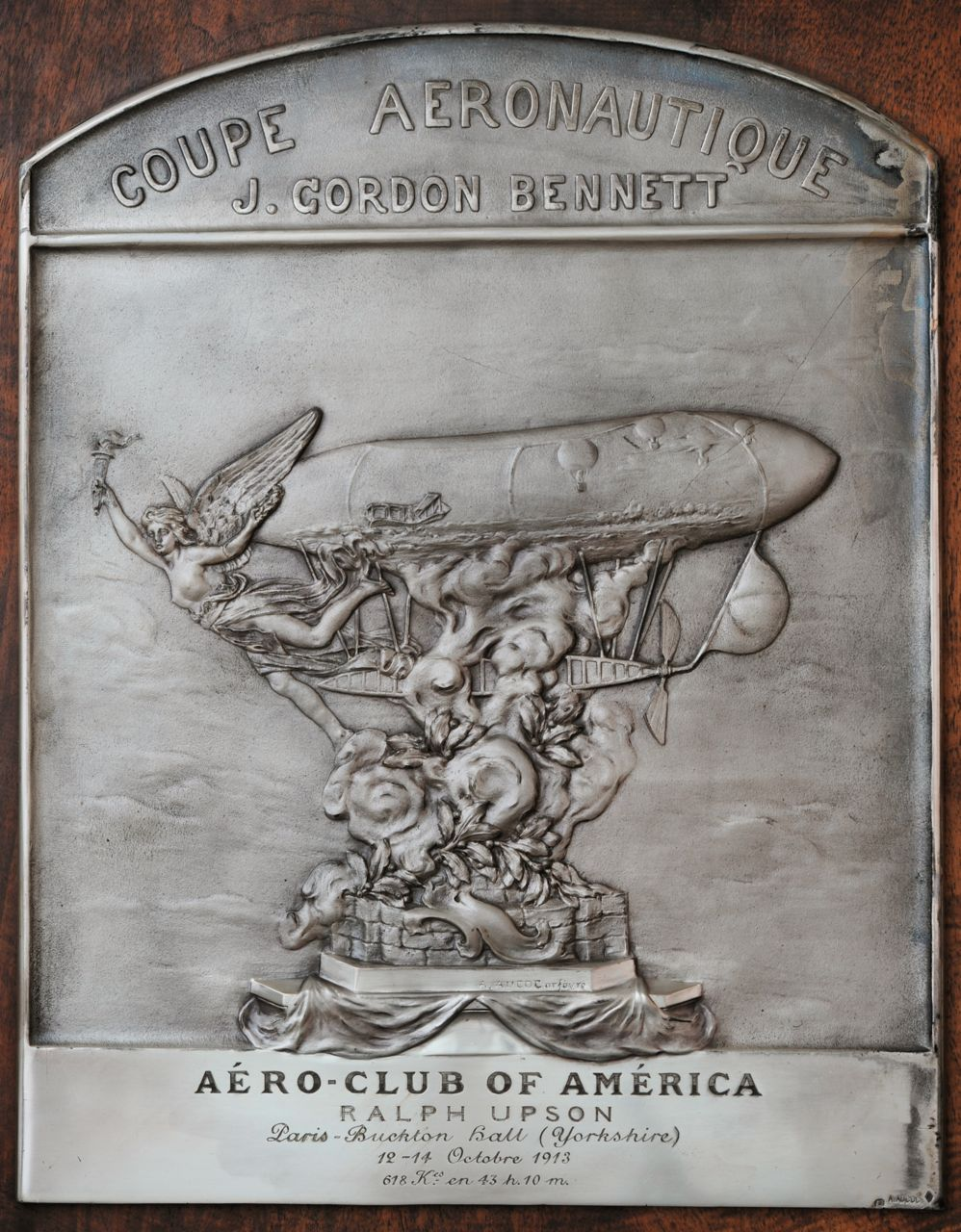
The trophy received by Ralph Upson for winning the Gordon-Bennett race in 1913.

Ralph Hazlett Upson (June 21, 1888 – August 13, 1968) was an American aviator. He was a pioneer in the aviation field, holding Airship Pilot's Certificate #7, Balloon Pilot's Certificate #48 and Pilot's License #10290. Upson designed the world's only all-metal stressed-skin airship and contributed to aerospace technology research. He won the 1913 International Balloon Race (with Ralph Preston). He was the second individual to win the Wright Brothers Medal in 1929.

== Biography ==
He was born in New York City on June 21, 1888, to Grace Hazlett, a physician, and William Ford Upson, a Wall Street attorney. His brother William Hazlett Upson was a noted author. Upson graduated from the Stevens Institute of Technology in 1910 and began work in the aeronautical office at the Goodyear Tire and Rubber Company in Akron, Ohio. In the 1920s, he worked on manned balloon flight at Goodyear. During World War I and immediately thereafter (1917-1921), Upson worked on the development of the US Navy's B, C, D, E, and F type airships and the US Army's AC and TC types. In 1920, he left Goodyear to work on development of a metalclad airship, becoming president (and chief engineer) of the Aircraft Development Corporation. The US Navy awarded a contract for one metalclad airship in 1928, and the next year Upson's concept of a duraluminum-skinned airship, the Detroit ZMC-2, launched from Detroit's Gross Ile Airport on August 20, 1929. The ZMC-2 remained in service until 1941, making 752 flights.

In the 1930s, Upson did consulting work for the US Navy, the National Advisory Committee for Aeronautics, and taught aerodynamics at the University of Michigan in Ann Arbor. He also designed the Union Pacific Railroad's City of Salina, a streamlined train designed with aerodynamic considerations. During World War 2, Upson was head of the aeronautics department at the Heinz Company, a builder of plywood gliders. He joined the staff of New York University in 1944 and moved in 1946 to the University of Minnesota, teaching aeronautical engineering until 1956. From 1956 to 1964, he was a research specialist at Boeing. Among his projects there was the aborted X-20 Dyna-Soar orbital space glider.

Upson had a heart attack while climbing Glacier Peak and died on August 13, 1968, aged 80, at Burien General Hospital in Burien, Washington.
