= Barnardsville, North Carolina =

Barnardsville
- Census-designated place
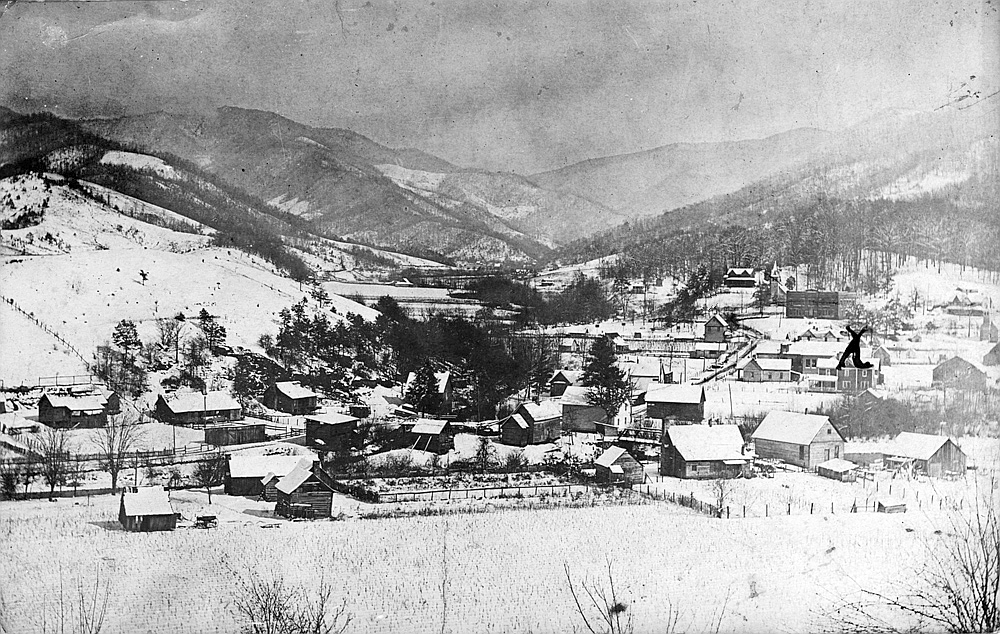
- Barnardsville, circa 1921

- Location within the state of North Carolina Barnardsville (the United States)
- Coordinates: 35°46′55″N 82°27′20″W
- Country: United States
- State: North Carolina
- County: Buncombe

Area
  - Total: 3.53 sq mi (9.14 km^{2})
  - Land: 3.53 sq mi (9.14 km^{2})
  - Water: 0 sq mi (0.00 km^{2})
- Elevation: 2,339 ft (713 m)

Population (2020)
  - Total: 559
  - Density: 158.4/sq mi (61.16/km^{2})
- Time zone: UTC-5 (Eastern (EST))
  - Summer (DST): UTC-4 (EDT)
- ZIP code: 28709
- Area code: 828
- GNIS feature ID: 2812779

Barnardsville is an unincorporated community and census-designated place (CDP) in Buncombe County, North Carolina, United States. It was first listed as a CDP in the 2020 census with a population of 559.

Located on Ivy Creek, the settlement is part of the Asheville Metropolitan Statistical Area.

== History ==
Barnard's Inn was established at the settlement by Hezekiah and Hester Barnard in the early 1800s.

A post office was established in 1875.

Barnardsville incorporated in 1959, and established its own police force and fire department. The town dissolved its incorporation in 1965 for financial reasons.

== Community ==
Located at the settlement is an elementary school, a restaurant, a post office, many churches, and the Big Ivy Community Center, where Mountain Heritage Day is celebrated on the first Saturday of October.

== Demographics ==
Historical population
Census	Pop.	Note	%±
2020	559		—
U.S. Decennial Census; 2020

=== 2020 census ===
Barnardsville CDP, North Carolina – Demographic Profile (NH = Non-Hispanic)
Race / Ethnicity	Pop 2020	% 2020
White alone (NH)	501	89.62%
Black or African American alone (NH)	3	0.54%
Native American or Alaska Native alone (NH)	0	0.00%
Asian alone (NH)	2	0.36%
Pacific Islander alone (NH)	0	0.00%
Some Other Race alone (NH)	10	1.79%
Mixed Race/Multi-Racial (NH)	30	5.37%
Hispanic or Latino (any race)	13	2.33%
Total	559	100.00%

Note: the US Census treats Hispanic/Latino as an ethnic category. This table excludes Latinos from the racial categories and assigns them to a separate category. Hispanics/Latinos can be of any race.
